= 2004 Belmont Stakes =

American horse race

136th Belmont Stakes
- Belmont Stakes
- Location: Belmont Park; Elmont, New York, U.S.
- Date: June 5, 2004
- Distance: 1 1/2 mi (12 furlongs; 2,414 m)
- Winning horse: Birdstone
- Winning time: 2:27.50
- Final odds: 36.00 (to 1)
- Jockey: Edgar Prado
- Trainer: Nick Zito
- Owner: Marylou Whitney Stables
- Conditions: Fast
- Surface: Dirt
- Attendance: 120,139

The 2004 Belmont Stakes was the 136th running of the Belmont Stakes. The 1 1/2-mile (2,400 m) race, known as the "test of the champion" and sometimes called the "final jewel" in thoroughbred horse racing's Triple Crown series, was held on June 5, 2004, three weeks after the Preakness Stakes and five weeks after the Kentucky Derby.

For the third year in a row, a horse won the Kentucky Derby and Preakness, only to lose the Belmont Stakes, lengthening the Triple Crown drought to 26 years. In 2004 before a record crowd, Smarty Jones was thought to have an excellent chance of completing the series as he was unbeaten and dominant in his earlier races. However, he failed to relax during the early part of the race when pressured by horses who eventually finished well back. Smarty Jones hit the lead with over half a mile to go but did not have enough energy left to withstand a late charge by Birdstone, who won at odds of 36–1.

== Pre-race ==
Undefeated in the lead-up to the Triple Crown series, Smarty Jones won the Kentucky Derby by 2 3/4 lengths, and then won the Preakness Stakes by 11 1/2 lengths. As a result, he became the heaviest favorite for the Belmont Stakes since Spectacular Bid and Secretariat in the 1970s. When he returned to his home base at Philadelphia Park after winning the Preakness, some 10,000 fans turned out just to see him gallop in the morning. When he traveled to Belmont Park a week before the race, he was accompanied through Pennsylvania by two motorcycle police officers, while other police cars blocked key intersections and three helicopters circled overhead. The cavalcade drove past a billboard on the Pennsylvania turnpike that read, "Look out New York, Smarty's Coming!" His owners received thousands of letters of encouragement and Smarty Jones merchandise was in high demand. "Smarty Fever" led to the largest attendance at Belmont Park in its history: 120,139.

There were concerns though. Smarty Jones was sired by a sprinter and his broodmare sire was also a sprinter, making his stamina a question mark. He had faced a grueling prep season without any time off since his first race in November 2003. His dominant performance in the Preakness may have taken too much out of him. His trainer, John Servis, tried to keep the horse fresh by giving the colt only one slow workout in the 5 weeks between the Derby and Belmont, while trying to keep the edge off by giving him just enough slower exercise.

Another concern was the constant attention from press and other visitors, which disrupted the stable routine. Barclay Tagg, who had been through a similar experience with Funny Cide, later recalled visiting Smarty Jones's barn one night at around midnight. "There were six guards in front of his stall, cutting up and drinking beer, and the light was on in his stall", he said. "It's very hard to keep the commotion down."

Rock Hard Ten was the second favorite for the Belmont after finishing second in both the Derby and Preakness. His owners had been disappointed in his Preakness performance though, feeling the horse would have done better if he had been closer to the pace. His jockey at the time, Hall of Famer Gary Stevens, disagreed and declined to ride the horse in the Belmont. "I wasn't about to... ride him in the Belmont if it meant following orders I couldn't live with", he said. Alex Solis picked up the mount.

Purge was the third choice in the field after winning the Peter Pan Stakes, while Eddington was the next choice after finishing third in the Preakness. The remaining horses were given little chance, including two entries by trainer Nick Zito. In particular, Birdstone was the "most maligned colt on the Derby trail" because of his small size and slight frame – he weighed only about 900 pounds at the time of the Belmont. Despite Birdstone's excellent breeding and respectable eighth-place finish in the Derby, he was a 36-1 long-shot for the Belmont.

== Race description ==
Smarty Jones got a good start and settled into third place behind Purge and Rock Hard Ten while running four-wide. The opening quarter-mile was a reasonable 24.33 seconds and the first half-mile went in 48.65 seconds. The pace then started to pick up significantly. Purge dropped back and Eddington moved forward to challenge for the lead while racing five wide. "I knew there was trouble on the backstretch. [Smarty Jones] wasn't settled", said Servis. "That was my concern the whole three weeks, trying to take the edge off. I wasn't able to do it. That's horse racing."

Pressured by Rock Hard Ten to the inside and Eddington to the outside, Smarty Jones ran the third quarter-mile in 23 seconds while the fourth quarter went in :23 3/5. Rounding the final turn, the challengers started to drop back as Smarty Jones completed the first 1 1/4 miles in a rapid 2:00.52 – a time fast enough to have won all but four Kentucky Derbies. His lead was opening and the crowd was in a frenzy.

In the final furlong though, Smarty Jones's stride started to falter. Track announcer Tom Durkin realized the pace might catch up with the horse and warned the crowd:

“The whip is out on Smarty Jones... It’s been 26 years... Just one furlong away... They’re coming down to the finish... Can Smarty Jones hold on? ... Here comes Birdstone... Birdstone surges past... Birdstone wins the Belmont Stakes... Smarty Jones was valiant, but vanquished."
– Tom Durkin

The crowd was stunned. "We came to see a coronation and instead we got a sporting event. Sometimes that happens", said John Hendrickson, the husband of Birdstone's owner, Marylou Whitney. "I’ve never been in a crowd of 120,000 people where it went from roaring to dead silence." In the winner's circle, Whitney apologized. "I’m sorry, I’m sorry, I’m sorry that Smarty Jones couldn’t win today," she said. "We would have been happy to run second."

The result remains controversial due to the tactics used with Rock Hard Ten and Eddington. Many felt that Jerry Bailey in particular on Eddington did not ride to win, as the early move while racing wide sacrificed his horse's chances. "I never saw two riders ride so hard to lose a race in my life", said Roy Chapman, the owner of Smarty Jones, a week after the race. "They just were out for one thing: making sure Smarty didn’t win." Some also criticized Smarty Jones's jockey, Stewart Elliott, for letting the horse move too early. Servis was more philosophical. "When he was dragging Stewie out of the saddle on the backside, I had a bad feeling," he said. "You can't do that and win going a mile and a half. That was one of the things that helped us in the Derby and the Preakness; he relaxed so well. He just didn't relax today."

== Chart ==
Finish	Program Number	Horse	Margin	Jockey	Trainer	Post Time Odds	Winnings
1	4	Birdstone	1	Edgar Prado	Nick Zito	36.00	$600,000
2	9	Smarty Jones	8	Stewart Elliott	John Servis	0.35	$200,000
3	6	Royal Assault	3	Pat Day	Nick Zito	27.75	$110,000
4	8	Eddington	Nose	Jerry Bailey	Mark Hennig	14.20	$60,000
5	5	Rock Hard Ten	14	Alex Solis	Jason Orman	6.70	$30,000
6	7	Tap Dancer	4 1/4	Javier Castellano	Edward Allard	40.50	
7	1	Master David	1	José A. Santos	Robert Frankel	24.50	
8	3	Caiman	8 1/4	Ramon Dominguez	Angel Medina	49.75	
9	2	Purge		John Velazquez	Todd Pletcher	9.80	

Source: Equibase
Times: 1/4 — 0:24.33; 1/2 — 0:48.65; 3/4 — 1:11.76; mile — 1:35.44; 1 1/4 — 2:00.52; final — 2:27.50.
Fractional Splits: (:24.33) (:24.32) (:23.11) (:23.68) (:25.08) (:26.98)

== Payout ==
The 136th Belmont Payout Schedule

Program Number	Horse Name	Win	Place	Show
4	Birdstone	$74.00	$14.00	$8.60
9	Smarty Jones	-	$3.30	$2.60
6	Royal Assault	-	-	$6.10

- $2 Exacta (4-9): $139.00
- $2 Trifecta (4-9-6): $1,589.00
- $1 Superfecta (4-9-6-8): $11,579.00

== See also ==
- 2004 Kentucky Derby
- 2004 Preakness Stakes
