= 2004 Preakness Stakes =

129th running of the Preakness Stakes

129th Preakness Stakes
- The Preakness Stakes
- "The Middle Jewel of the Triple Crown" "The Run for the Black-Eyed Susans"
- Location: Pimlico Race Course, Baltimore, Maryland, United States
- Date: May 15, 2004
- Winning horse: Smarty Jones
- Winning time: 1:55.59
- Final odds: 0.7-1
- Jockey: Stewart Elliott
- Trainer: John Servis
- Conditions: Fast
- Surface: Dirt
- Attendance: 124,351

The 2004 Preakness Stakes was the 129th running of the Preakness Stakes thoroughbred horse race. The race took place on May 15, 2004, and was televised in the United States on the NBC television network. Smarty Jones, who was jockeyed by Stewart Elliott, won the race by eleven and one half lengths over runner-up Rock Hard Ten. Approximate post time was 6:25 p.m. Eastern Time. The race was run over a fast track in a final time of 1:55.59. The Maryland Jockey Club reported total attendance of 124,351, this is recorded as second highest on the list of American thoroughbred racing top attended events for North America in 2004.

== Payout ==
The 129th Preakness Stakes Payout Schedule

Program Number	Horse Name	Win	Place	Show
7	Smarty Jones	$3.40	$3.00	$2.60
10	Rock Hard Ten	-	$5.00	$4.00
9	Eddington	-	-	$5.20

- $2 Exacta: (7–10) paid $24.60
- $2 Trifecta: (7–10–9) paid $177.20
- $1 Superfecta: (7–10–9–1) paid $230.70

== The full chart ==
Finish Position	Margin (lengths)	Post Position	Horse name	Jockey	Trainer	Owner	Post Time Odds	Purse Earnings
1st	0	7	Smarty Jones	Stewart Elliott	John Servis	Someday Farm	0.70-1 favorite	$650,000
2nd	11 1/2	10	Rock Hard Ten	Gary Stevens	Jason Orman	Mercedes Stable	6.90-1	$200,000
3rd	13 1/2	9	Eddington	Jerry Bailey	Mark A. Hennig	Wilmott Stables	13.20-1	$100,000
4th	13 3/4	1	Lion Heart	Mike E. Smith	Patrick Biancone	D.Smith & M.Tabor	4.90-1	$50,000
5th	14	8	Imperialism	Kent Desormeaux	Kristin Mulhall	Steve Taub	6.60-1	
6th	15	6	Sir Shackleton	Rafael Bejarano	Nicholas P. Zito	Tracy Farmer	37.50-1	
7th	15 3/4	2	Borrego	Victor Espinoza	C. Beau Greeley	J & S Kelly	12.80-1	
8th	21	3	Little Matth Man	Richard Migliore	Martin E. Ciresa	Vincent Papandrea	45.00-1	
9th	23	5	Song of the Sword	Jorge Chavez	Jennifer Pederson	Paraneck Stable	51.00-1	
10th	26 1/2	11	Water Cannon	Ryan Fogelsonger	Linda Albert	The Nonsequitur Stable	39.50-1	

- Winning Breeder: Someday Farm; (PA)
- Final Time: 1:55.59
- Track Condition: Fast
- Total Attendance: 124,351

== See also ==
- 2004 Kentucky Derby
- 2004 Belmont Stakes
