= National Thoroughbred Racing Association Moment of the Year =

Horse racing award

The National Thoroughbred Racing Association Moment of the Year award, first awarded in 1999, celebrates or honors one moment that occurred during a given year that most thoroughly exemplifies the spirit and ethos of the sport of Thoroughbred horse racing in the United States.

Unlike all other Eclipse Awards, which are voted on by a chosen committee from among the horse racing world, the Moment of the Year is voted on by racing fans. The balloting takes place at the NTRA Web site (ntra.com) and each year offers voters a choice between twelve different “moments” that illustrate either outstanding equine athleticism or a heroic achievement or even, possibly, tragedy. But all moments chosen for the ballot are considered worthy of winning the Moment of the Year.

The winner of the publicly voted award accepts it at the Eclipse Awards ceremony held each year.

== Past winners ==
- 2025 - Forever Young becoming the first Japanese-bred and trained racehorse to win the Breeders' Cup Classic.
- 2024 – Seize the Grey for his win in the 2024 Preakness Stakes.
- 2023 – Cody's Wish for his second straight win in the Breeders' Cup Dirt Mile, with his namesake Cody Dorman and his family in attendance. (Note: The horse's namesake, who met the future champion as a 12-year-old when the horse was a 5-month-old foal, suffered from a disabling genetic condition that left him unable to walk or speak. The day after Cody's Wish's 2023 Dirt Mile win, Cody Dorman died while he and his family were returning to their Kentucky home.)
- 2022 – Cody's Wish for his win in the Breeders' Cup Dirt Mile, also with Cody Dorman and his family in attendance.
- 2021 - Loves Only You and Marche Lorraine for their wins in the 2021 Breeders' Cup, respectively in the Filly & Mare Turf and the Distaff. They were the first Japanese horses to win a Breeders' Cup race.
- 2020 - Authentic for his win in the 2020 Kentucky Derby.
- 2019 - Maximum Security's Kentucky Derby disqualification.
- 2018 - Justify’s dominant victory in the 150th Belmont Stakes to become just the 13th Triple Crown winner.
- 2017 - Response by the horse racing community to the San Luis Rey fire.
- 2016 - California Chrome for his win in the 2016 Dubai World Cup.
- 2015 - American Pharoah for his win in the 2015 Belmont Stakes, becoming the first winner of the Triple Crown since 1978.
- 2014 - California Chrome for his win in the 2014 Kentucky Derby.
- 2013 - Mucho Macho Man winning the Breeders' Cup Classic, trained by Kathy Ritvo, who became the first woman to train a Breeders' Cup Classic winner, and ridden by returning 50-year-old jockey Gary Stevens.
- 2012 - Paynter, winner of the 2012 Haskell Invitational Stakes and runner-up to Union Rags in the 2012 Belmont Stakes, recovers from a life-threatening illness.
- 2011 - Drosselmeyer winning the Breeders' Cup Classic.
- 2010 - Blame's narrow win in the Breeders' Cup Classic holding off the late charge from the previously undefeated Zenyatta.
- 2009 - Zenyatta's second Breeders' Cup win, this time as the first female to win the Breeders' Cup Classic and also the first horse ever to win two different Breeders' Cup races.
- 2008 - Zenyatta caps her undefeated season with a last-to-first win in the Breeders' Cup Ladies Classic.
- 2007 – The historic victory by the filly Rags to Riches over Curlin in the 2007 Belmont Stakes. Rags to Riches was the first filly to win this race in 102 years.
- 2006 – The hope for recovery of Barbaro at the New Bolton Center after he was seriously injured during the first few moments of the 2006 Preakness Stakes.
- 2005 – Afleet Alex’s spectacular life-threatening stumble, yet going on to win in the 2005 Preakness Stakes.
- 2004 – Birdstone’s upset win in the Belmont Stakes over Smarty Jones, winner of that year’s Kentucky Derby and Preakness Stakes.
- 2003 – Funny Cide’s win in the Kentucky Derby of 2003. Funny Cide was the first New York-bred to win the Derby and the first gelding since Clyde Van Dusen in 1929.
- 2002 – Voters this year mourned the passing of the last living American Triple Crown winner, Seattle Slew.
- 2001 – Tiznow’s second win due to his repeat victory in the Breeders' Cup Classic over Sakhee.
- 2000 – Tiznow’s dramatic victory over Giant's Causeway in the Breeders' Cup Classic.
- 1999 – Charismatic, and jockey Chris Antley racing for the Triple Crown in the 1999 Belmont Stakes when Charismatic pulled up lame and Antley placed himself in harm’s way to protect the stricken horse.

== See also ==
- Secretariat Vox Populi Award
