= Miss Woodford Stakes =

- Class: Ungraded Stakes
- Location: Monmouth Park Racetrack; Oceanport, New Jersey, United States
- Inaugurated: 1952
- Race type: Thoroughbred – Flat racing
- Website: www.monmouthpark.com

Race information
- Distance: 6 furlong sprint
- Surface: Dirt
- Track: left-handed
- Qualification: Three-year-old fillies
- Weight: Assigned
- Purse: $75,000 (2016)

The Miss Woodford Stakes is an American Thoroughbred horse race usually run each year in August at Monmouth Park Racetrack in Oceanport, New Jersey open to three-year-old fillies. An ungraded stakes currently offering a current purse of $75,000, it is a sprint race contested over a distance of six furlongs on the dirt.

Added to Monmouth Park's stakes schedule in 1952, the race is named for the great racing mare Miss Woodford of the late 19th century who was inducted into the National Museum of Racing and Hall of Fame in 1967. It was at Monmouth in the old Monmouth Oaks that Miss Woodford ran the race that made her the highest earning racehorse of her time. Fellow U.S. Racing Hall of Fame inductees Tosmah (1964) and Ta Wee (1969) won this race.

The Miss Woodford stakes was run in two divisions in 1967 and again in 1986.

== Records ==
Speed record:

- 1:08.60 – Ta Wee (1969)

Most wins by a jockey:

- 4 – Craig Perret (1983, 1986 (2×), 1991)

Most wins by a trainer:

- 2 – MacKenzie Miller (1959, 1970)
- 2 – "Sunny" Jim Fitzsimmons (1962, 1963)
- 2 – Anthony J. Bardaro (1974, 1978)
- 2 – Warren A. Croll Jr. (1975, 1977)
- 2 – Robert W. Camac (1984, 1987)

Most wins by an owner:

- 2 – Darby Dan Farm (1954, 1961)
- 2 – Wheatley Stable (1962, 1963)
- 2 – Bright View Farm (1974, 1978)
- 2 – Raymond Dweck (1997, 2001)

== Winners ==
Year	Winner	Jockey	Trainer	Owner	Time
2019*	Fancy Dress Party	Nik Juarez	Ben Colebrook	LNJ Foxwoods	1:03.78
2016	Appealing Maggie	Christopher P. DeCarlo	Michael E. Hushion	Black Swan Stable	1:09.23
2015	Fusaichi Red	Orlando Bocachica	George Weaver	Smart Choice Stable	1:10.22
2014	Stormy Novel	Kendrick Carmouche	John Servis	Cam Allard	1:10.67
2013	Indian Spell	Gabriel Saez	Besilu Stables	Edward Plesa Jr.	1:12.01
2012	Say a Novena	Paco Lopez	Edward Plesa Jr.	Rick Shanley	1:10.04
2011	No Race				
2010	My Irish Girl	Israel Ocampo	Brad H. Cox	Midwest Thoroughbreds	1:10.45
2009	Don'tgetsuspicious	Kendrick Carmouche	Scott A. Lake	Winners Circle Partners V	1:10.00
2008	Shining Image	Daniel Centeno	John Terranova II	Sovereign Stable	1:09.85
2007	Coco Belle	Garrett Gomez	John W. Sadler	Ann & Jerry Moss	1:09.15
2006	Chandelle No. Five	Alan Garcia	Joan Scott	Dixiana Stable	1:10.42
2005	Career Oriented	Chris DeCarlo	Joe Orseno	D. J. Stable/Frank Neuwirth	1:10.31
2004	Then She Laughs	Stewart Elliott	Martin E. Ciresa	Vincent Papandrea	1:10.03
2003	Elegant Designer	Mario Pino	Anthony W. Dutrow	Michael H. Sherman	1:10.99
2002	Maresha	Eddie King Jr.	John Servis	D. J. Stable	1:10.39
2001	Stormy Pick	Eibar Coa	Ben W. Perkins Jr.	Raymond Dweck	1:10.80
2000	Malvern Rose	José Vélez Jr.	J. C. Zimmerman	Patricia R. Brunstetter	1:10.40
1999	Paparika	José C. Ferrer	Charles R. Harvatt	Monkey Key Stable	1:09.80
1998	Cocney Lass	Julie Krone	C. Darren Glennon	Rainbow End Racing/A. Alexander/G. Sternberg	1:10.65
1997	Vegas Prospector	José Vélez Jr.	Timothy A. Hills	Raymond Dweck	1:09.67
1996	Ruby Baby	José A. Santos	James E. Baker	Woodlynn Farm	1:10.00
1995	Valid Goddess	Chuck Lopez	Michael P. Petro	Sunnymede Farm	1:10.60
1994	Pleasant Dilemma	B. Douglas Thomas	Edward T. Allard	G. Campbell	1:10.00
1993	Code Blum	Tom Turner	L. William Donovan	H & D Stable	1:11.00
1992	Debra's Victory	Mickey Walls	Phil England	Knob Hill Stable	1:09.40
1991	Devilish Touch	Craig Perret	Carlos A. Garcia	Burning Tree Farm	1:11.00
1990	Barronette	Art Madrid Jr.	D. Wayne Lukas	Peter M. Brant	1:10.00
1989	Queen's Reckoning	Jorge Chavez	Lawrence E. Murray	Howard Bender	1:11.00
1988	Ready Jet Go	Robert E. Colton	Linda L. Rice	Clyde Rice	1:09.80
1987	Cagey Exuberance	Jake Nied Jr.	Robert W. Camac	Lindsey D. Burbank	1:10.40
1986	Fighter Fox	Craig Perret	LeRoy Jolley	Kentucky Blue Stable	1:09.60
1986	Storm & Sunshine	Craig Perret	Thomas J. Kelly	Woodcrest Farms	1:08.60
1985	Danzig Darling	Herb McCauley	Pete D. Anderson	Red Tree Farm	1:12.20
1984	Gracefully Yours	Joe Hampshire Jr.	Robert W. Camac	Theodore V. Kruckel	1:10.40
1983	Grecian Comedy	Craig Perret	Joseph H. Pierce Jr.	Henry B Lindh	1:10.00
1982	Platinum Belle	Jimmy Edwards	James W. Murphy	E. & T. Stone	1:12.40
1981	Prismatical	Don Brumfield	Luis Barrera	Happy Valley Farm	1:09.60
1980	Cerada Ridge	Don Brumfield	Stanley M. Rieser	Patricia M. Block	1:11.20
1979	Drop Me A Note	B. Douglas Thomas	Melvin Calvert	Genter Stable	1:09.80
1978	Dungarven	Dan Nied	Anthony J. Bardaro	Bright View Farm	1:11.40
1977	Herecomesthebride	Larry Samuell	Warren A. Croll Jr.	Mrs. W. A. Croll Jr.	1:10.00
1976	Horsing Around	B. Douglas Thomas	J. Willard Thompson	John P. Costanzo	1:12.40
1975	Stulcer	Frank Iannelli	Warren A. Croll Jr.	Jaclyn Stable	1:09.00
1974	Family Name	Walter Blum	Anthony J. Bardaro	Bright View Farm	1:10.20
1973	Shake A Leg	George Cusimano	Bud Delp	Windfields Farm	1:10.00
1972	Candid Catherine	Carlos Barrera	Everett W. King	Mrs. Lloyd L. Miller	1:10.00
1971	Cyamome	Bill Hartack	David A. Whiteley	Edith W. Bancroft	1:10.20
1970	Capercaillie	Jorge Velásquez	MacKenzie Miller	Cragwood Stables	1:10.40
1969	Ta Wee	Eddie Belmonte	John A. Nerud	Tartan Stable	1:08.60
1968	First Noel	Jesse Davidson	Joseph Kulina	Anderson Fowler	1:10.60
1967	Just Kidding	Braulio Baeza	J. Elliott Burch	Rokeby Stable	1:10.60
1967	Wageko	Jorge Velásquez	Joseph S. Nash	Fitz Eugene Dixon Jr.	1:10.80
1966	Natashka	Larry Adams	William A. Peterson	George Franklin Getty II	1:09.60
1965	Honor Bright	Wayne Chambers	George M. Baker	Keswick Stables	1:11.20
1964	Tosmah	Sam Boulmetis	Joseph W. Mergler	Briardale Farm	1:10.40
1963	King's Story	William Zakoor	Jim Fitzsimmons	Wheatley Stable	1:11.00
1962	Batter Up	Hedley Woodhouse	Jim Fitzsimmons	Wheatley Stable	1:09.40
1961	Primonetta	Howard Grant	James P. Conway	Darby Dan Farm	1:10.20
1960	Staretta	Sam Boulmetis	Thomas J. Kelly	Leonard P. Sasso	1:10.40
1959	Recite	Howard Grant	MacKenzie Miller	Rockburn Farm	1:09.00
1958	Delnita	Joe Culmone	Frankie Sanders	Reverie Knoll Farm	1:12.40
1957	Mrs. Hellen	Jorge Contreras	J. W. Rankin	McIver Prickett	1:10.20
1956	Olympia Dell	Jesse Higley	C. W. Parish	Circle M Farm	1:11.40
1955	Blue Sparkler	Glen Lasswell	Harry M. Wells	Woodland Farm	1:10.40
1954	Clear Dawn	Harrison Wilson	Jack Long	Darby Dan Farm	1:10.00
1953	My Sin	Ted Atkinson	John M. Gaver Sr.	Greentree Stable	1:12.00
1952	Nilufer	Sam Boulmetis	James W. Maloney	Mrs. Gerald S. Smith	1:11.40

- - Run at 5 1/2 furlongs.
