= I'll Get Along =

I'll Get Along may refer to:

- I'll Get Along (horse), a Thoroughbred racehorse
- "I'll Get Along" (song), a 2012 song by Michael Kiwanuka
