= Bird Town =

American-bred Thoroughbred racehorse

- Sire: Cape Town
- Grandsire: Seeking The Gold
- Dam: Dear Birdie
- Damsire: Storm Bird
- Sex: Mare
- Foaled: April 11, 2000
- Country: United States
- Colour: Bay
- Breeder: Marylou Whitney Stables
- Owner: Marylou Whitney Stables
- Trainer: Nick Zito
- Record: 12: 4-6-2
- Earnings: $871,251

Major wins
- Charon Stakes (2003); Kentucky Oaks (2003); Acorn Stakes (2003)

Awards
- American Champion Three-Year-Old Filly (2003)

Bird Town (foaled April 11, 2000) is an American Thoroughbred racehorse and broodmare. After showing some promise when winning one of her four starts as a two-year-old in 2002, she emerged as one of the best North American fillies of her generation in the following summer with wins in the Kentucky Oaks and the Acorn Stakes. She also finished second in the Test Stakes and the Beldame Stakes before being retired at the end of the season with a record of four wins in twelve races.

== Background ==
Bird Town is a bay mare bred in Kentucky by her owner Marylou Whitney, the widow of Cornelius Vanderbilt Whitney. She was from the first crop of foals sired by Cape Town, whose five wins included the 1998 Florida Derby. His other progeny have included the Monmouth Oaks winner Capeside Lady and the Lone Star Derby winner Southern Africa. Bird Town's dam Dear Birdie won two minor races but became a very successful broodmare, producing several other winners including the Belmont Stakes winner Birdstone. Whitney sent her filly into training with Nick Zito.

== Racing career ==
=== 2002: two-year-old season ===
Bird Town began her track career at Keeneland on October 9 in a maiden race over seven furlongs in which she was ridden by Pat Day and finished second of the eleven runners behind Star of Atticus. A month later she was again partnered by Day when she was moved up in distance to contest a maiden over one and one sixteenth miles at Churchill Downs. Starting favourite against ten opponents, she took the lead from the start and won by six and three quarter lengths from Throne. Two weeks later over the same course and distance, she started the 0.4/1 favorite for an allowance race, but was beaten three quarters of a length by In Case of Wind. Bird Stone ended her first season, by traveling to Florids for the Three Rings Stakes at Calder Race Course. Ridden by Eibar Coa, she started the 1.4/1 favorite, but after contesting the early lead she weakened in the closing stages and finished third, beaten three quarters of a length and a neck by Dakota Light and Never Fail.

=== 2003: three-year-old season ===
Bird Town remained in Florida in early 2003, running twice at Gulfstream Park. In an allowance race on January 16 the filly was ridden by Day led into the straight before finishing second, beaten a neck by the Shug McGaughey-trained favorite Yell. On February 23 Bird Town, ridden by Coa, was moved down in the distance for the seven furlong Charon Stakes and won by twelve and a half lengths from Crafty Brat, after taking the lead on the penultimate turn. The filly prepared for the Kentucky Oaks with a run in the Grade II Beaumont Stakes over seven furlongs at Keeneland on April 10. Ridden by Coa, she started the 3.3/1 second favorite and contested the lead from the start before finishing second, one and a quarter lengths behind the winner My Boston Gal.

On 2 May, Bird Town was one of twelve fillies to contest the 129th running of the Kentucky Oaks in front of a 100,523 crowd at Churchill Downs in which she was ridden for the first time by Edgar Prado. Her opponents included My Boston Gal, Yell and In Case of Wind as well as Elloluv and Lady Tak, first and second in the Ashland Stakes and Santa Catarina (runner-up to Storm Flag Flying in the Frizette Stakes). Lady Tak started favorite ahead of Elloluv and My Boston Gal, with Bird Town being made an 18.2/1 outsider. Bird Town stumbled exiting the starting gate before being settled by Prado in eighth place on the outside. She turned into the stretch in sixth before making a sustained late run, taking the lead from Santa Catarina approaching the final furlong and going clear to win by three and a quarter lengths. Yell took third place ahead of Elloluv and My Boston Gal. After the race Zito said "What heart this filly has. She never runs a bad race. Consistency makes you great". Whitney, whose late husband had won the race four times between 1936 and 1975 said "I love my homebreds. We buy horses, too. But homebreds mean so much to me".

On her next appearance Bird Town was matched against Lady Tak and the 2002 American Champion Two-Year-Old Filly Storm Flag Flying in the Grade I Acorn Stakes over one mile at Belmont Park on June 6. Starting at odds of 2.65/1 the filly was sent into the lead by Prado soon after the start and held off a sustained challenge form Lady Tak to win by a head, with the favored Storm Flag Flying finishing sixth of the seven runners. Bird Town dropped back to seven furlongs for the Grade I Test Stakes at Saratoga in July. Starting the 1.75/1 favorite she raced just behind the leaders but on this occasion proved no match for Lady Tak and finished second, beaten four and a half lengths by the winner. Three weeks later, the filly started second favorite for the Alabama Stakes over ten furlongs at the same track but failed to recover after being bumped in the early stages and finished fifth of the six runners behind Island Fashion. Zito was unable to account for the filly's poor run, saying "It just wasn't our day. She's been running all year, so who knows?"

At Belmont on October 4, Bird Town was matched against older fillies and mares for the first time in the Grade I Beldame Stakes over nine furlongs. Ridden by Aaron Gryder, she took the lead soon after the start and set the pace before being overtaken on the final turn by the favored Sightseek and finished second, four and a half lengths behind the older filly. Despite her defeat, Zito praised his filly saying "I can't be more thrilled... I don't care what anybody tells me, Bird Town is the best three-year-old filly right now. We put up a good fight and that's all I cared about." Her retirement was announced three days later.

== Assessment and awards ==
In the Eclipse Awards for 2003, Bird Town was named American Champion Three-Year-Old Filly beating the French-trained Six Perfections by 96 votes to 94.

== Breeding record ==
Bird Town was retired from racing to become a broodmare at her owner's stud farm. She has produced the following foals:

- Elusive Bird, 2006 bay filly by Elusive Quality. Unraced.
- Bird Zapper, 2007 bay colt by Ghostzapper. Unraced.
- Gyre, 2008 bay colt by Bernardini. Failed to win in three starts.
- Prescott Brown, 2009 bay colt (later gelded) by Awesome Again. Won two minor races from seven starts.
- Eton Blue, 2010 bay colt (later gelded) by Giant's Causeway. Has won eight of 48 starts as of June 2018.
- Tapit Town, 2011 bay colt (later gelded) by Tapit. Failed to win in four starts.
- Tiz Town, 2012 bay colt (later gelded) by Tiznow. Has won six of 36 starts as of June 2018.
- Bird Song, 2013 gray colt by Unbridled's Song. A multiple graded stakes winner and winner of the 2017 Fred W. Hooper Stakes and Alysheba Stakes.
- Gull Island, 2014 chestnut filly by Giant's Causeway. Failed to win in seven starts as of June 2018.
- One More Dream, 2016 dark bay or brown colt by Graydar. Unraced as of June 2018.
- Bird Patrol, 2018 bay filly by Empire Maker.

In 2018, Bird Town was one of eight mares followed by the National Museum of Racing and Hall of Fame's Foal Patrol, which allows viewers to view livestreams of Thoroughbred mares in the late stages of pregnancy and with their young foals.

In 2024, the Marylou Whitney stables donated Bird Town to Old Friends Equine, the first Kentucky Oaks winner retired there.

== Pedigree ==
Pedigree of Bird Town (USA), bay mare, 2000
Sire Cape Town (USA) 1995	Seeking the Gold (USA); 1985	Mr. Prospector	Raise a Native
Sire Cape Town (USA) 1995	Seeking the Gold (USA); 1985	Mr. Prospector	Gold Digger
Sire Cape Town (USA) 1995	Seeking the Gold (USA); 1985	Con Game	Buckpasser
Sire Cape Town (USA) 1995	Seeking the Gold (USA); 1985	Con Game	Broadway
Sire Cape Town (USA) 1995	Seaside Attraction (USA); 1987	Seattle Slew	Bold Reasoning
Sire Cape Town (USA) 1995	Seaside Attraction (USA); 1987	Seattle Slew	My Charmer
Sire Cape Town (USA) 1995	Seaside Attraction (USA); 1987	Kamar	Key To The Mint
Sire Cape Town (USA) 1995	Seaside Attraction (USA); 1987	Kamar	Square Angel
Dam Dear Birdie (USA) 1987	Storm Bird (CAN); 1978	Northern Dancer	Nearctic
Dam Dear Birdie (USA) 1987	Storm Bird (CAN); 1978	Northern Dancer	Natalma
Dam Dear Birdie (USA) 1987	Storm Bird (CAN); 1978	South Ocean	New Providence
Dam Dear Birdie (USA) 1987	Storm Bird (CAN); 1978	South Ocean	Shining Sun
Dam Dear Birdie (USA) 1987	Hush Dear (USA); 1978	Silent Screen	Prince John
Dam Dear Birdie (USA) 1987	Hush Dear (USA); 1978	Silent Screen	Prayer Bell
Dam Dear Birdie (USA) 1987	Hush Dear (USA); 1978	You All	Nashua
Dam Dear Birdie (USA) 1987	Hush Dear (USA); 1978	You All	Honey Dear (Family 8-f)
