= Southwest Stakes =

- Class: Grade III
- Location: Oaklawn Park Race Track; Hot Springs, Arkansas
- Inaugurated: 1968 (as Southwest Handicap)
- Race type: Thoroughbred - Flat racing
- Website: Oaklawn Jockey Club

Race information
- Distance: 1 1/16 mile
- Surface: Dirt
- Track: Left-handed
- Qualification: Three-year-olds
- Weight: 122 lbs with allowances
- Purse: $1,000,000 (since 2025)
- Bonuses: Qualifications points – Road to the Kentucky Derby

The Southwest Stakes is a Grade III American Thoroughbred horse race for three-year-old horses at a distance of one and one-sixteenth miles on the dirt run annually in late January at Oaklawn Park Race Track in Hot Springs, Arkansas. The event currently offers a purse of $1,000,000.

== History ==
The inaugural running of the event was on 2 March 1968 as the Southwest Handicap over a distance of six furlongs and was won by Robert E. Lehmann's Mr. Crozy by 2 1/2 lengths in a fast time on 1:10 2/5.

Oaklawn Park acknowledges that prior to 1968 there existed an event known as the Southwest Purse, however these events are not considered in the official counts of the renewal of this event. The event that was run on 24 March 1959 was a claiming event for four-year-olds and older while the event run on 17 February 1962 was held on opening day of the race meet and over a distance of 5 1/2 furlongs for three year olds.

The Southwest Handicap was increased to one mile in 1983.

The conditions of the event were changed from a handicap to a stakes race with allowances in 1985 with a rename of the race to Southwest Stakes. Originally ungraded, the Southwest Stakes was upgraded to a Grade III event in 2008 by the American Graded Stakes Committee.

The distance was increased to 1 1/16 miles in 2013.

The event has been held in split divisions in 1972, 2002, and 2012.

The 1984 winner Whitebrush set a new track record for the mile distance which still stands at Oaklawn Park.

The race is often used as a prep to the Rebel Stakes and Arkansas Derby, and is part of the Road to the Kentucky Derby. Among the horses who have used the Southwest as a springboard to the Triple Crown series are Lil E. Tee (won 1992 Kentucky Derby after finishing third in the 1992 Southwest), Pine Bluff (won Preakness after being second in the 1992 Southwest) and Smarty Jones (won the Southwest, Kentucky Derby and Preakness in 2004).

Since 2013 the event has been part of the Road to the Kentucky Derby.

For many years the event was usually held during the President's Day weekend but was moved to late January after Oaklawn Park introduced a new schedule of their expanded program for the 2021–22 racing season.

In 2024, the race was moved back one week from January 27 to February 3 due to weather.

== Records ==
Speed record:

- 1 1/16 miles – 1:41.83 One Liner (2017)
- 1 mile – 1:34.40 Whitebrush (1984) Track Record
- 6 furlongs – 1:10.40 Mr. Crozy (1968)

Margins:

- 12 lengths – Tarascon (1990)

Most wins by a jockey:

- 3 - Larry Snyder (1979, 1983, 1990)
- 3 - Rafael Bejarano (2012 - both divisions, 2013)
- 3 - John R. Velazquez (2017, 2022, 2023)

Most wins by a trainer:

- 6 - Bob Baffert (2010, 2012 - both divisions, 2013, 2022, 2023)

Most wins by an owner:

- 3 - Loblolly Stable (1984, 1987, 1991)

== Winners ==
Year	Winner	Jockey	Trainer	Owner	Distance	Time	Purse	Grade	Ref
Southwest Stakes
2026	Silent Tactic	Cristian A. Torres	Mark E. Casse	John C. Oxley	1 1/16 miles	1:44.85	$1,000,000	III	
2025	Speed King	Rafael Bejarano	Ron Moquett	Triton Thoroughbreds	1 1/16 miles	1:45.86	$1,000,000	III	
2024	Mystik Dan	Emmanuel Esquivel	Juan Sanchez	J. Patrick Lee Racing	1 1/16 miles	1:45.04	$800,000	III	
2023	Arabian Knight	John R. Velazquez	Bob Baffert	Zedan Racing Stables	1 1/16 miles	1:43.50	$750.000	III	
2022	Newgrange	John R. Velazquez	Bob Baffert	SF Racing, Starlight Racing, Madaket Stables, Robert E. Masterson, Stonestreet Stables, Jay A. Schoenfarber, Waves Edge Capital, Catherine Donovan, Golconda Stable & Siena Farm	1 1/16 miles	1:45.83	$750,000	III	
2021	Essential Quality	Luis Saez	Brad H. Cox	Godolphin Racing	1 1/16 miles	1:45.48	$750,000	III	
2020	Silver Prospector	Ricardo Santana Jr.	Steven M. Asmussen	Ed & Susie Orr	1 1/16 miles	1:43.01	$750,000	III	
2019	Super Steed	Terry J. Thompson	J. Larry Jones	Michael Pressley & Steed Jackson	1 1/16 miles	1:44.05	$500,000	III	
2018	My Boy Jack	Kent J. Desormeaux	J. Keith Desormeaux	Don't Tell My Wife Stables & Monomoy Stables	1 1/16 miles	1:46.00	$500,000	III	
2017	One Liner	John R. Velazquez	Todd A. Pletcher	WinStar Farm, China Horse Club International & SF Racing	1 1/16 miles	1:41.83	$500,000	III	
2016	Suddenbreakingnews	Luis S. Quinonez	Donnie K. Von Hemel	Samuel F. Henderson	1 1/16 miles	1:45.14	$500,000	III	
2015	Far Right	Mike E. Smith	Ron Moquett	Robert V. LaPenta & Harry T. Rosenblum	1 1/16 miles	1:47.50	$300,000	III	
2014	Tapiture	Ricardo Santana Jr.	Steven M. Asmussen	Winchell Thoroughbreds	1 1/16 miles	1:44.95	$300,000	III	
2013	Super Ninety Nine	Rafael Bejarano	Bob Baffert	Tanma Corporation	1 1/16 miles	1:44.84	$300,000	III	
2012	Castaway	Rafael Bejarano	Bob Baffert	Willmott Stables	1 mile	1:37.08	$250,000	III	Division 1
2012	Secret Circle	Rafael Bejarano	Bob Baffert	Derrick Smith, Susan Magnier, Michael Tabor	1 mile	1:38.09	$250,000	III	Division 2
2011	Archarcharch	Jon Court	William H. Fires	Robert Yagos	1 mile	1:38.23	$250,000	III	
2010	Conveyance	Martin Garcia	Bob Baffert	Zabeel Racing International	1 mile	1:36.94	$250,000	III	
2009	Old Fashioned	Ramon A. Dominguez	J. Larry Jones	Fox Hill Farms	1 mile	1:37.41	$250,000	III	
2008	Denis of Cork	Robby Albarado	David M. Carroll	Mr. & Mrs. William K. Warren Jr.	1 mile	1:37.89	$250,000	III	
2007	Teuflesberg	Stewart Elliott	Jamie Sanders	Gary S. Logsdon, Jamie Sanders & Donnie Kelly	1 mile	1:38.20	$250,000	Listed	
2006	Lawyer Ron	John McKee	Robert E. Holthus	Estate James T. Hines, Jr.	1 mile	1:40.00	$250,000	Listed	
2005	Greater Good	John McKee	Robert E. Holthus	Lewis G. Lakin	1 mile	1:39.09	$100,000	Listed	
2004	Smarty Jones	Stewart Elliott	John C. Servis	Someday Farm	1 mile	1:37.57	$100,000	Listed	
2003	Great Notion	Terry J. Thompson	Darrin Miller	Silverton Hill	1 mile	1:38.96	$75,000	Listed	
2002	Private Emblem	Donnie Meche	Steven M. Asmussen	James Cassels & Bob Zollars	1 mile	1:41.70	$75,000	Listed	Division 1
2002	Paloma Parilla	James Lopez	Larry Robideaux Jr.	Barnett Stables	1 mile	1:40.29	$75,000	Listed	Division 2
2001	Son of Rocket	Terry J. Thompson	Robert E. Holthus	Frank Fletcher Racing	1 mile	1:38.34	$75,000	Listed	
2000	Afternoon Affair	Joseph C. Judice	Robert E. Holthus	Swifty Farms	1 mile	1:37.18	$75,000	Listed	
1999	Jim'smrtee	Travis Wayne Hightower	John Milliron	James M. Hutzel	1 mile	1:39.52	$75,000	III	
1998	Hot Wells	Calvin H. Borel	Thomas M. Amoss	So What's Nu Stable	1 mile	1:38.69	$75,000	III	
1997	Smoke Glacken	Craig Perret	Henry L. Carroll	Alex Karkenny, Robert Levy & William Roberts	1 mile	1:38.73	$100,000	III	
1996	Ide	Craig Perret	Peter M. Vestal	Willmott Stables	1 mile	1:37.81	$100,000	III	
1995	Mystery Storm	Carlos Gonzalez	Larry Robideaux Jr.	David Beard	1 mile	1:36.63	$100,000	III	
1994	Southern Rhythm	Garrett K. Gomez	James O. Keefer	L. William Heiligbrodt, Ted Keefer & Walter New	1 mile	1:36.95	$100,000	Listed	
1993	Foxtrail	Willie Martinez	Larry Robideaux Jr.	Linda Bennett	1 mile	1:36.51	$100,000	Listed	
1992	Big Sur	David Guillory	D. Wayne Lukas	Overbrook Farm	1 mile	1:36.68	$100,000	Listed	
1991	Fenter	Donald Lee Howard	Thomas K. Bohannan	Loblolly Stable	1 mile	1:37.06	$75,000	Listed	
1990	Tarascon	Larry Snyder	Jack Van Berg	John A. Franks	1 mile	1:35.80	$58,400		
1989	Termez	Dean Kutz	J. Bert Sonnier	Kip Knelman & Steve Hayden	1 mile	1:37.80	$63,000		
1988	Proper Reality	Jerry D. Bailey	Robert E. Holthus	James A. Winn	1 mile	1:36.80	$60,700		
1987	Demons Begone	Pat Day	Philip M. Hauswald	Loblolly Stable	1 mile	1:34.60	$59,900		
1986	Rare Brick	Mike E. Smith	A. J. Foyt III	A. J. Foyt	1 mile	1:36.20	$66,400		
1985	Clever Allemont	Pat Day	Lynn S. Whiting	W. Cal Partee	1 mile	1:37.60	$62,300		
Southwest Handicap
1984	Whitebrush	Garth Patterson	Claude R. McGaughey III	Loblolly Stable	1 mile	1:34.40	$50,000		
1983	Say I'm Smart	Larry Snyder	David R. Vance	Flying Zee Stable	6 furlongs	1:11.80	$50,000		
1982	El Baba	Donald Brumfield	Dewey P. Smith	Mrs. Joe W. Brown	6 furlongs	1:12.60	$50,000		
1981	Bold Ego	John Lively	Dennis Werre	Double B Ranch	6 furlongs	1:11.80	$50,000		
1980	Be A Prospect	Herb McCauley	Barr H. Inman	Carl W. Swan	6 furlongs	1:12.00	$50,000		
1979	Clever Trick	Larry Snyder	Del W. Carroll	William S. Farish III	6 furlongs	1:11.20	$50,000		
1978	Bold L. B.	John Lively	Dennis Werre	Dazoc Stable	6 furlongs	1:11.00	$50,000		
1977	J. J. Battle	Carlos Rivas	W. R. Charlie Morse	Jay Chestnut	6 furlongs	1:12.80	$25,000		
1976	Our Future King	James McKnight	Kenneth Burkhart	Attica Farm	6 furlongs	1:10.60	$25,000		
1975	Promised City	David E. Whited	Larry R. Spraker	Big 1 Farm	6 furlongs	1:11.00	$25,000		
1974	§ J. R.'s Pet	Darrel G. McHargue	Harold Tinker	W. Cal Partee	6 furlongs	1:11.20	$25,000		
1973	§ Game Lad	Louis Spindler	David R. Vance	Dan Lasater	6 furlongs	1:10.60	$30,000		
1972	Parlez Encore	Lonnie Ray	James L. Levitch	Dr. C. R. Jarrell	6 furlongs	1:13.20	$20,000		Division 1
1972	Billy Rogell	Earl Knapp	Larry L. Fontenot	Perle L. & Charles R. Grissom	6 furlongs	1:12.20	$20,000		Division 2
1971	Barbizon Streak	Arturo Romero	Oran Battles	Mrs. Herman J. Udouj	6 furlongs	1:10.80	$20,000		
1970	Love That Dollar	Ronald J. Campbell	D. Scott Posey	Everett Lowrance	6 furlongs	1:12.60	$15,000		
1969	Ruler in Gold	Phil Grimm	Ronnie G. Warren	Mr. & Mrs. R. F. Roberts	6 furlongs	1:11.60	$15,000		
1968	Mr. Crozy	Lonnie Ray	Douglas Davis Jr.	Robert E. Lehmann	6 furlongs	1:10.40	$12,500		
Southwest Purse
1962	Killoqua	Kenward Bernis	W. Tomlinson	John D. Askew	5 1/2 furlongs	1:05.20	$3,200		
1960–1961		Race not held							
1959	† Call Hy	Eugene Curry	W. Dorsey	M-S Stable	6 furlongs	1:11.20	$2,500		

Notes:
§ Ran as an entry
† The running of the event on 24 March 1959 was a claiming event for four-year-olds and older. The winner Call Hy was a five year old.

== See also ==
- List of American and Canadian Graded races
