= Eddington (horse) =

American-bred Thoroughbred racehorse

- Sire: Unbridled
- Grandsire: Fappiano
- Dam: Fashion Star
- Damsire: Chief's Crown
- Sex: Stallion
- Foaled: 2001
- Country: United States
- Colour: Chestnut
- Breeder: Carl Rosen Associates
- Owner: Willmott Stables
- Trainer: Mark Hennig
- Record: 17: 6-3-6
- Earnings: US$ 1,216,760

Major wins
- Pimlico Special Handicap (2005); Gulfstream Park Handicap (2005); Calder Derby (2004)

Eddington (foaled in 2001) is a millionaire American Thoroughbred racehorse and successful sire bred in Kentucky by Carl Rosen and Associates and raced under the Willmott Stables banner (nom de course for Peter Willmott). He finished racing with a record of 6-3-6 in 17 starts and career earnings of $1,216,760. Eddington was best known for his wins in the Grade I Pimlico Special and the Grade II Gulfstream Park Handicap as well as his in-the-money showing in the Grade I Preakness Stakes. As a yearling, he was sent to Ocala, Florida, to the master horsemen Art Fisher.

== Two-year-old season ==
Eddington was a late-developing colt and only raced once as two-year-old. He placed second in his first time out.

== Three-year-old season ==
At age three, Eddington won his maiden race and an allowance, both at Gulfstream Park. He started the year by winning the Grade III Calder Derby at nine furlongs on the turf at Calder Race Course on New Year's Day. He also finished in the money in five graded stakes races later that year.

On the road to the Triple Crown, Eddington placed third in New York City's two biggest prep races at Aqueduct Racetrack. He finished third to Saratoga County in the $250,000 Grade III Gotham Stakes. Then he was third in the $750,000 Grade I Wood Memorial Stakes to Tapit.

Trainer Mark Hennig then entered Eddington in the $1,000,000 Grade I Preakness Stakes at Pimlico Race Course. As the field of eleven stakes winners went into the club house turn, Derby runner-up Lion Heart led while eventual Horse of the Year Smarty Jones sat off his flank as Eddington fell back to a stalker's position in sixth. Going into the far turn, Lion Heart sprinted out to a three- length lead as most of the field bunched up. As the field hit the top of the stretch, Smarty Jones passed Lion Heart and widened his lead with every stride. Eddington was seventh but started closing on the leaders except Smarty Jones, who broke a 130-year-old record for largest winning margin in the Preakness . Rock Hard Ten finished second and Eddington finished third, earning $100,000.

Later that summer, Eddington closed late again to place third in the Grade I Travers Stakes at Saratoga Race Course to Belmont winner Birdstone. He followed that up with a runner-up finish in the autumn in the Grade III Pegasus Stakes at Meadowlands Racetrack. He finished his sophomore season with a record of (11): 3-2-4 and annual earnings of $605,360.

== Four-year-old season ==
At age four, Eddington started the year with a third in the Grade I Donn Handicap behind Saint Liam and Roses In May. He won an allowance race and then won the $300,000 Grade II Gulfstream Park Handicap by 3 1/2 lengths over Pies Prospect, avenging his Pegasus loss. Eddington then finished third again in the Oaklawn Handicap behind Grand Reward and Second of June.

== Pimlico Special win ==
In May 2005, Eddington won his first Grade I race in the $600,000 Pimlico Special at 9 1/2 furlongs on the dirt at Pimlico Race Course in Baltimore, Maryland. In that race, he defeated seven stakes winners, winning by 5 1/2 lengths over highly regarded Pollard's Vision and Presidentialaffair. That race turned out to be his last as Eddington was injured working out one month later. He finished his four-year-old season with a record of (5): 3-0-2 and annual earnings of $602,200.

== Retirement ==
Eddington was retired on June 29, 2005, to Claiborne Farm due to soft tissue injury in a front leg. He later began his stallion career at Claiborne Farm in Paris, Kentucky.

In the 2008 breeding season, Eddington's stud fee was $20,000. In October 2008, Claiborne Farm announced it would drop his stud fee to $15,000 for the 2009 breeding season. For the 2010 breeding season, Eddington's stud fee was halved to $7500.

In 2009, Eddington's progeny has had ten different race winners.

In 2013, Eddington was relocated to Don and Karen Cohn's Ballena Vista Farm in Ramona, California.

Eddington's 2019 stud fee is listed on the farm's web site as $3500 LFSN.
