= Backtalk (horse) =

American-bred Thoroughbred racehorse

- Sire: Smarty Jones
- Grandsire: Elusive Quality
- Dam: Apasionata Sonata
- Damsire: Affirmed
- Sex: Stallion
- Foaled: 2007
- Country: United States
- Colour: Bay
- Breeder: Three Chimney Farms
- Owner: GoldMark Farm
- Trainer: Thomas M. Amoss
- Record: 6: 4-1-1
- Earnings: $241,206

Major wins
- Bashford Manor Stakes (2009); Sanford Stakes (2009); Sportsman's Paradise Stakes (2010)
- Last updated on 7 December 2006

Backtalk is an American Thoroughbred racehorse and sire. He was sired by Smarty Jones, who in 2004 lost his bid for the Triple Crown when he ran second to Birdstone. Backtalk is out of the mare Apasionata Sonata, a daughter of Triple Crown winner Affirmed. He is a multiple stakes winner having won the Bashford Manor Stakes, the Sanford Stakes and the Sportsman's Paradise Stakes.
