= Robert W. Camac =

American horse trainer (1940–2001)

Personal information
- Born: August 21, 1940 Wilmington, Delaware, U.S.
- Died: December 6, 2001 (aged 61) Oldmans Township, New Jersey, U.S.
- Occupation: Trainer

Horse racing career
- Sport: Horse racing
- Career wins: 1,811

Major racing wins
- Miss Woodford Stakes (1984, 1987); Astarita Stakes (1986); Correction Handicap (1988, 1989); First Flight Handicap (1988); Interborough Handicap (1989); Sorority Stakes (1989); Black-Eyed Susan Stakes (1991); Philip H. Iselin Handicap (1992); Fred "Cappy" Capossela Stakes (1993, 1997); Hudson Stakes (NYB) (1997); Jimmy Winkfield Stakes (1997); Cotillion Handicap (1999)

Honours
- Robert Camac Memorial Handicap at Philadelphia Park

Significant horses
- Wire Me Collect, Jolie's Halo; Wide Country, Cagey Exuberance

Robert W. Camac (August 21, 1940 – December 6, 2001) was an American horse trainer and owner/breeder in Thoroughbred racing. He was murdered in 2001.

Born in Wilmington, Delaware, Bob Camac came from a Thoroughbred horse racing family in which two of his uncles worked as trainers. He became a professional trainer in 1976 and built a successful career working primarily at smaller racetracks in Delaware and Philadelphia. In 1988, he was the leading trainer for the fall-winter meet at Philadelphia Park Racetrack and although he was never in the national limelight until after his death, during his career Camac trained the winners of 1,811 races. A well-respected and well-liked trainer, fellow horseman John Servis told The New York Times that Camac "was more than just a trainer, he was a good businessman and would manage his owners' stables. Not too many guys had the kind of overall knowledge he had."

For a number of years Bob Camac trained horses for stable owner Arthur I. Appleton, earning a Grade I win in the 1992 Philip H. Iselin Handicap with Jolie's Halo. Camac bred the 2003 New Jersey horse of the year, Gators N Bears, but it was Smarty Jones who was his most important breeding accomplishment. Camac trained for Roy and Patricia Chapman, owners of Someday Farm. For them, Camac purchased the filly I'll Get Along for $40,000 at the 1993 Keeneland September yearling sale. I'll Get Along won twelve races and earned $276,969 before becoming a broodmare. Camac suggested that the Chapmans breed her to Elusive Quality. They agreed, and Camac arranged the mating which on February 28, 2001, produced a colt given the name Smarty Jones.

== Death ==
Sixty-one-year-old Robert Camac and his fifty-five-year-old wife, Maryann V. Camac, were shot to death at their farm in the Pedricktown section of Oldmans Township, New Jersey, on December 6, 2001. Their funeral service was held at Trinity United Methodist Church in Pennsville, New Jersey on December 12, and they were buried in Gracelawn Memorial Park in New Castle.

Thirty-six-year-old Wade Russell, Maryann Camac's son from a previous marriage, was arrested and charged with their deaths. Russell pled guilty to aggravated manslaughter and was sentenced to twenty-eight years in prison. He was later transferred to a psychiatric facility in Trenton, New Jersey, after authorities had to place him on suicide watch.

Following Bob Camac's death, Roy and Patricia Chapman sold most of their horses but on the advice of a friend, kept Smarty Jones.

Robert and Maryann are survived by their daughter, Tracy Stranahan, as well as their grandchildren and his children from his first marriage, Robert Daniel Camac, Leslie Ann Camac Cole, Clinton W. Camac and Michael F. Camac.

== Sources ==
- Robert Camac's obituary at Bloodhorse.com
- Finley, Bill (May 12, 2004). "Derby Success Tinged With Sadness". The New York Times.
