= Willa On the Move Stakes =

- Class: Black Type
- Location: United States
- Inaugurated: 2012
- Race type: Thoroughbred – Flat racing
- Website: https://www.laurelpark.com/

Race information
- Distance: 6 1/2 furlongs
- Surface: Dirt
- Track: Left-handed
- Qualification: Fillies & Mares, three-years-old & up
- Weight: Assigned
- Purse: US$100,000

The Willa On the Move Stakes is an American Thoroughbred horserace run each December since 2012 at the Laurel Park racetrack near Laurel, Maryland. A race for fillies and mares age three and older, it is currently contested on dirt over a distance of 6 1/2 furlongs.

The event was named to honor two successful female Thoroughbred racehorses that were both named Willa On the Move by their Maryland breeder, Robert L. Quinichett. The first was a foal of 1985 that raced for her breeder’s wife, Lorraine Quinichett. Trained by Leon Blusiewicz, the filly’s wins included the 1988 edition of the Grade 1 Ashland Stakes. Foaled in 1999, Quinichett’s second Willa On the Move was purchased by Marathon Farm, Inc., a racing and breeding operation owned by Peter Angelos. A successful trial lawyer, Angelos was also the majority owner of the Baltimore Orioles Major League Baseball team. Peter Angelos hired Rodney Jenkins to train Willa On the Move for whom she won the 2002 Politely Stakes. In 2003, under the care of new trainer Anthony Dutrow, Willa On the Move won the Grade 3 Honorable Miss Stakes, plus the Maryland Million Distaff Handicap and the Xtra Heat Stakes.

== Records ==
Speed record:

- 6.5 furlongs – 1:17.59 : Swayin to and Fro (2022)
- 6 Furlongs – 1:09.47 : Dontletsweetfoolya (2020)

Most wins:

- 2 - Lady Sabelia (2014, 2015)

Most wins by a jockey:

- 4 - Horacio Karamanos (2014, 2015, 2016, 2021)

Most wins by a trainer:

- 2 - Timothy C. Kreiser (2013, 2021)
- 2 - Robin L. Graham (2014, 2015)

Most wins by an owner:

- 2 - Mrs. Frank P. Wright (2014,2015)
- 2 - Morici Racing Stable LLC (Diane D. Morici) (2024, 2025)

== Winners ==
Year	Winner	Age	Jockey	Trainer	Owner	Dist. (Miles)	Time	Win$	Grade
2025	Grammy Girl	4	Mychel Sanchez	Saffie A. Joseph Jr.	Morici Racing Stable LLC (Diane D. Morici)	6.5 F - muddy	1:18.56	$60,000	B/T
2024	Ms. Bucchero	4	Xavier Perez	Diane D. Morici	Morici Racing Stable LLC (Diane D. Morici)	6.5 F - muddy	1:18.53	$60,000	B/T
2023	Headland	7	Angel Cruz	George R. Weaver	Thomas Brockley	6.5 F - fast	1:18.46	$60,000	L/R
2022	Swayin to and Fro	3	Grant Whitacre	Mario Serey Jr.	Baxter Racing Stable	6.5 F - fast	1:17.59	$60,000	L/R
2021	Kaylasaurus	5	Horacio Karamanos	Timothy C. Kreiser	Bush Racing Stable & Liberty House Racing	6 F - fast	1:11.74	$60,000	L/R
2020	Dontletsweetfoolya	3	Jevian Toledo	Lacey Gaudet	Five Hellions Farm (Ned Williams & Mike Mattese)	6 F - fast	1:09.47	$60,000	L/R
2019	Majestic Reason	4	Trevor McCarthy	H. Graham Motion	Hillwood Stable LLC & Richard L. Golden	6 F - fast	1:10.68	$60,000	B/T
2018	Late Night Pow Wow	3	Fredy Peltroche	Javier Contreras	Breeze Easy, LLC (Mike Hall & Sam Ross)	6 F - sloppy	1:10.53	$60,000	B/T
2017	Ms Locust Point	3	Jorge A. Vargas Jr.	John Servis	Jim Reichenberg, & Cash is King LLC (Chuck Zacney)	6 F - fast	1:09.84	$60,000	B/T
2016	Lovable Lady	5	Horacio Karamanos	Mary E. Eppler	Samuel H. Rogers Jr. Trust	6 F - fast	1:09.56	$60,000	B/T
2015	Lady Sabelia	5	Horacio Karamanos	Robin L. Graham	Mrs. Frank P. Wright	6 F - fast	1:10.17	$60,000	B/T
2014	Lady Sabelia	4	Horacio Karamanos	Robin L. Graham	Mrs. Frank P. Wright	6 F - sloppy	1:10.42	$60,000	B/T
2013	She's Ordained	4	Angel Quinones	Timothy C. Kreiser	Ronald Ulrich	6 F - fast	1:10.58	$60,000	B/T
2012	Winning Image	5	Jose Caraballo	Michael C. Aro	Martin Scafidi	6 F - fast	1:11.24	$60,000	L/R
