= Marylou Whitney =

American socialite and philanthropist (1925–2019)

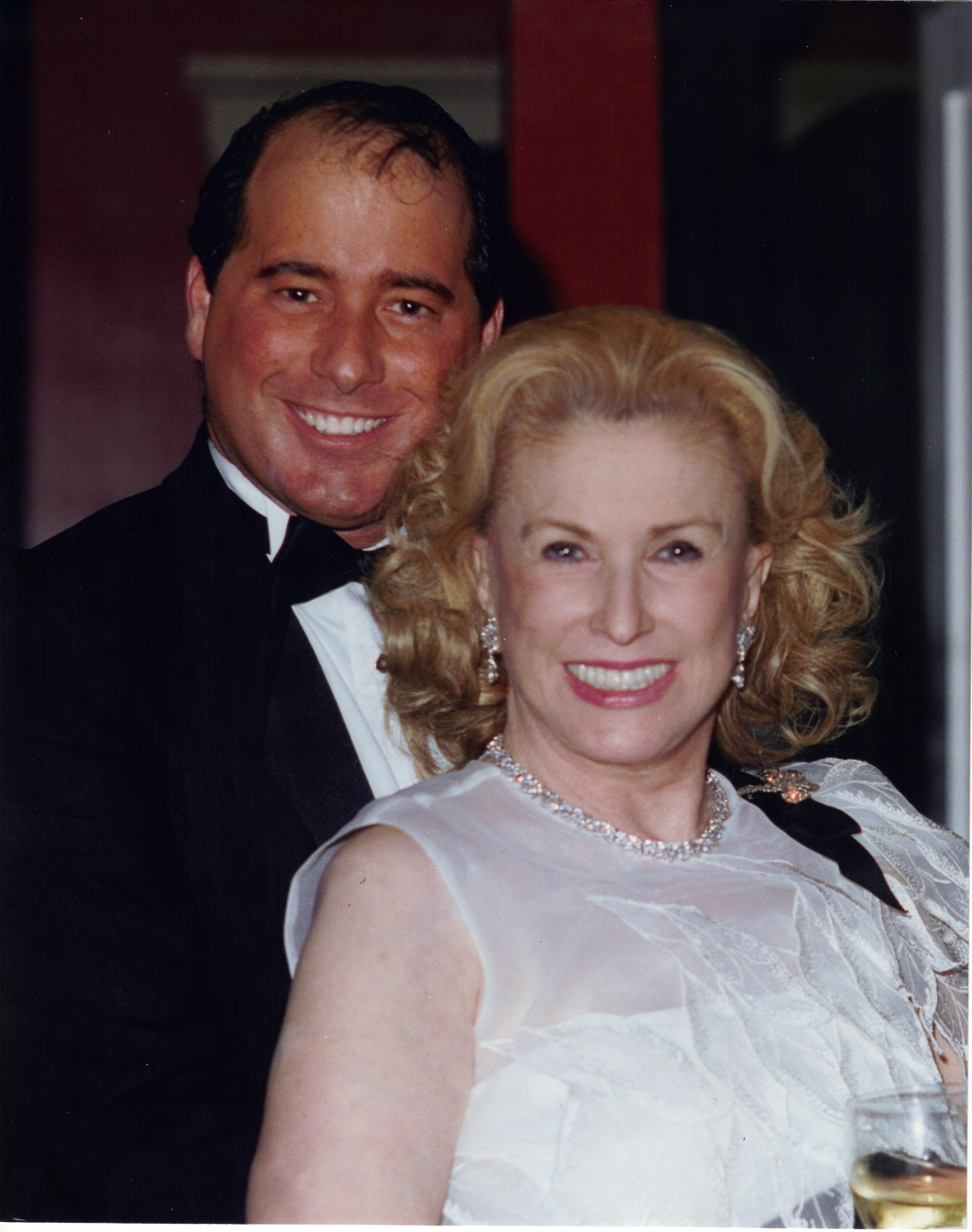
- With her third husband, John Hendrickson
- Born: Marie Louise Schroeder; December 24, 1925; Kansas City, Missouri, U.S.
- Died: July 19, 2019 (aged 93); Saratoga Springs, New York, U.S.
- Occupations: Philanthropist; Horse breeder
- Spouses: Frank Hosford (m. 1948, divorced) Cornelius Vanderbilt Whitney (m. 1958; died 1992) John Hendrickson (m. 1997)
- Children: 5
- Honors: United States Racing Hall of Fame, Pillar of the Turf (2019)

Marylou Whitney (née Schroeder; December 24, 1925 – July 19, 2019) was an American socialite and philanthropist. A prominent owner and breeder of thoroughbred racehorses, Whitney was known for "reigning for decades as the social queen of the Saratoga and Lexington racing seasons".

== Early life ==
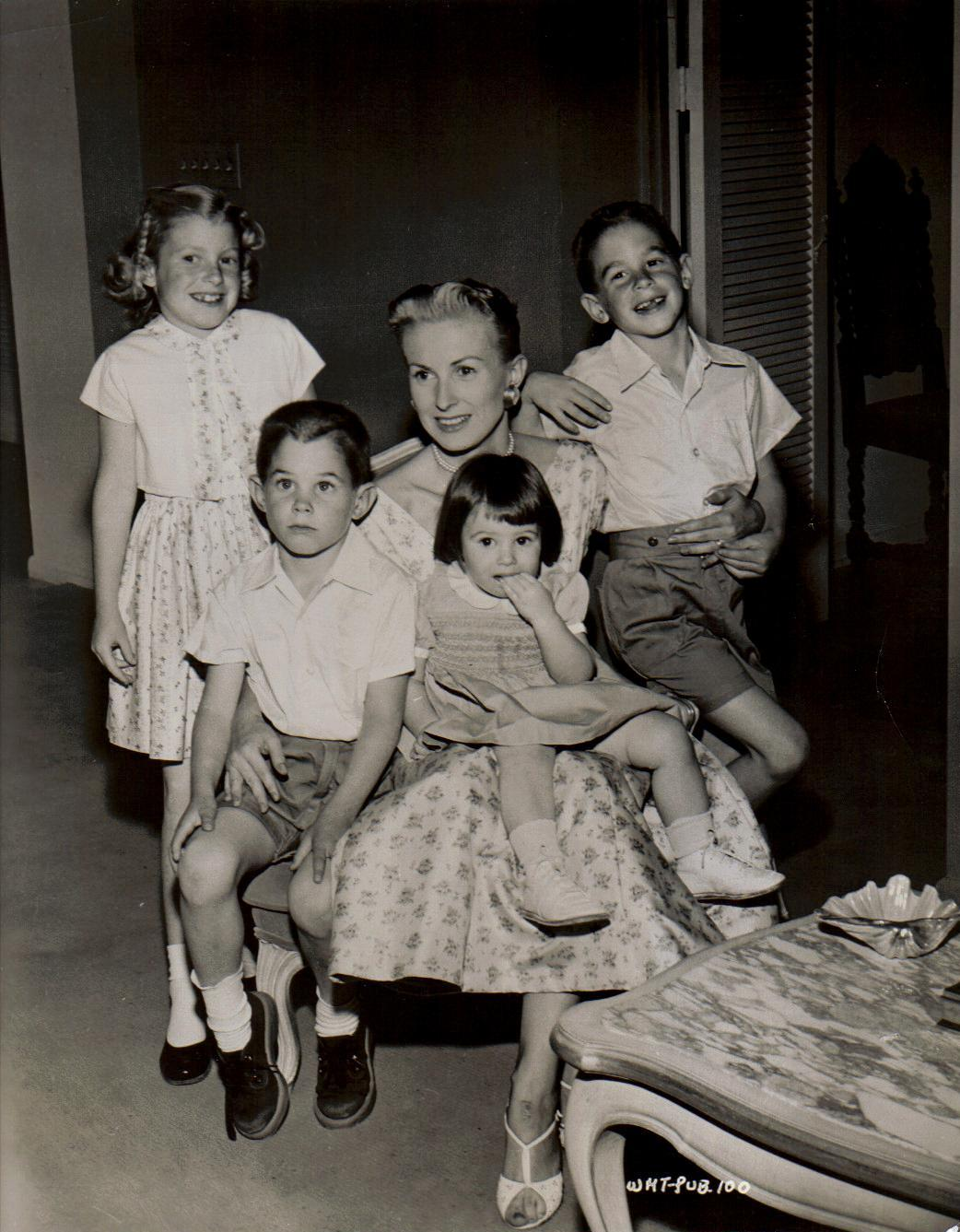
Marylou Whitney with children, 1959

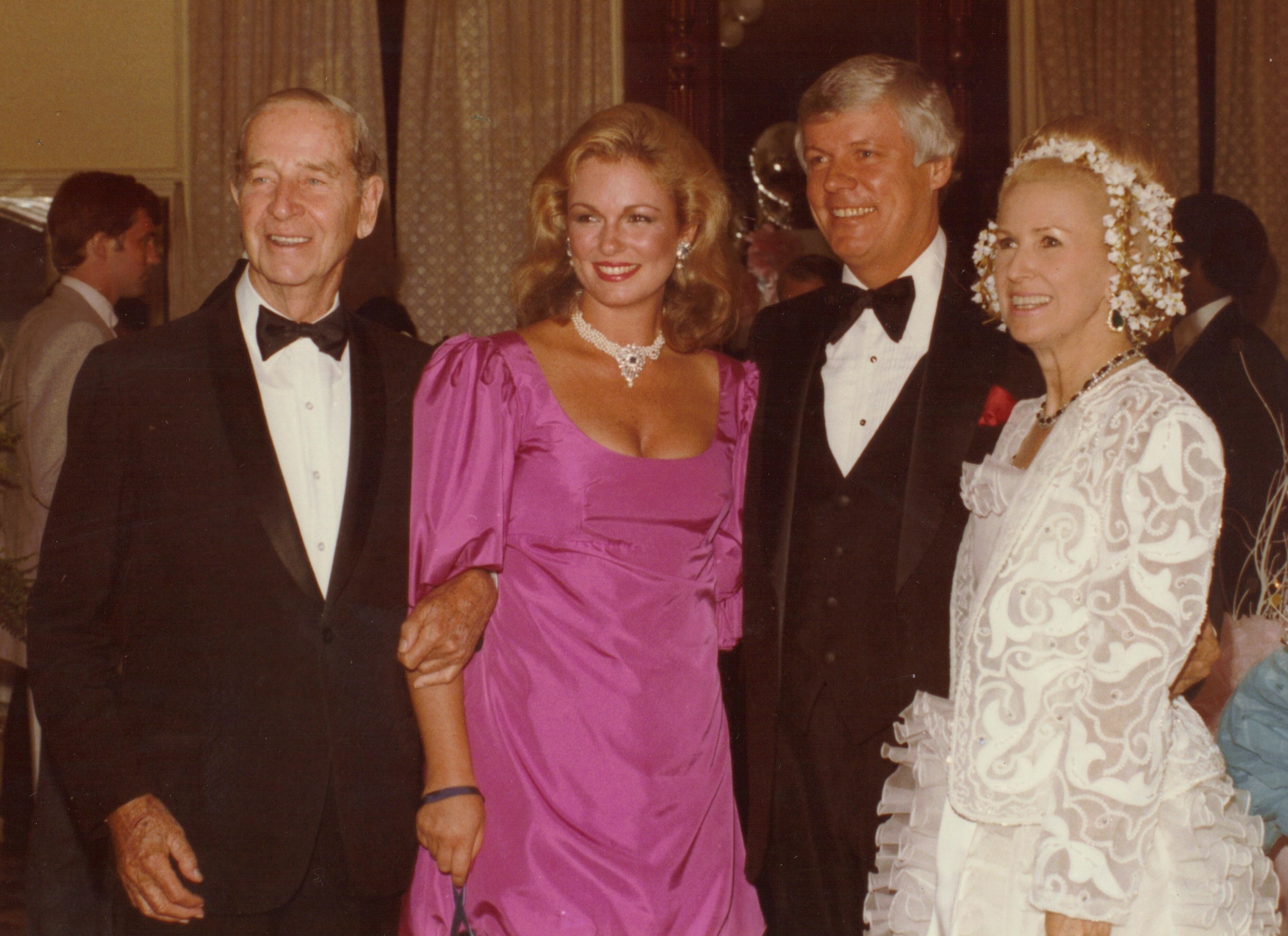
Marylou and Cornelius Vanderbilt Whitney, with Governor and Mrs. John Y. Brown Jr.

Mary Louise Schroeder was born in Kansas City, Missouri, the youngest of four children of Marie Jean (Carr) and Harry Robert Schroeder, a bank officer and accountant.

In 1948, she married Frank Hosford, the heir to the John Deere fortune. They had four children together: Marion Louise "M'Lou", Frank "Hobbs", Henry "Hank", and Heather. After they divorced, Marylou married Cornelius Vanderbilt Whitney in 1958. They had one daughter, Cornelia. C.V. Whitney died in 1992, leaving Marylou with an estate estimated at $100 million.

In October 1997, Marylou married John Francis Hendrickson (born 1965), a (then) 32-year-old tennis champion and former aide to Governor Wally Hickel of Alaska, who was nearly 40 years her junior. Hendrickson proposed at Buckingham Palace.

== Horse racing ==
C.V. Whitney and his family were a major force in thoroughbred horse racing and have had more stakes winners than any other family in the history of racing in the United States. Whitney dispersed his stock in the 1980s, not wanting to burden his wife with the business. After being widowed, Marylou spent a substantial amount of time and money trying to buy back "Whitney Mares". She purchased Dear Birdie, who proved to be the foundation for "Marylou Whitney Stables". Dear Birdie was named Broodmare of the Year in 2004. She is the dam of Birdstone and champion Bird Town. Marylou Whitney Stables bred, raced and stands Birdstone, the 2004 Belmont Stakes and Travers Stakes winner. Birdstone produced two classic winners in his first crop: 2009 Kentucky Derby winner Mine That Bird and eventual 2009 Three Year Old Champion Summer Bird. No other stallion has sired two classic winners in his first crop since the late 19th century. Whitney also bred and raced champion filly Bird Town, who holds the record for the fastest Kentucky Oaks in history. Whitney is the only woman to breed and race a Kentucky Oaks winner. In 2003, she was honored by the New York Turf Writers with the Ogden Phipps Award (Top Breeder).

Whitney was one of the founding members of the Thoroughbred Retirement Foundation and was the major contributor to the Secretariat Center at the Kentucky Horse Park, where the Marylou Whitney Barn is stationed. She believed in finding retired racehorses new careers and loving homes once their racing careers ended. Attached to each Jockey Club registration paper of every horse she bred was a message indicating how to contact her if one of her horses was in need of a home.

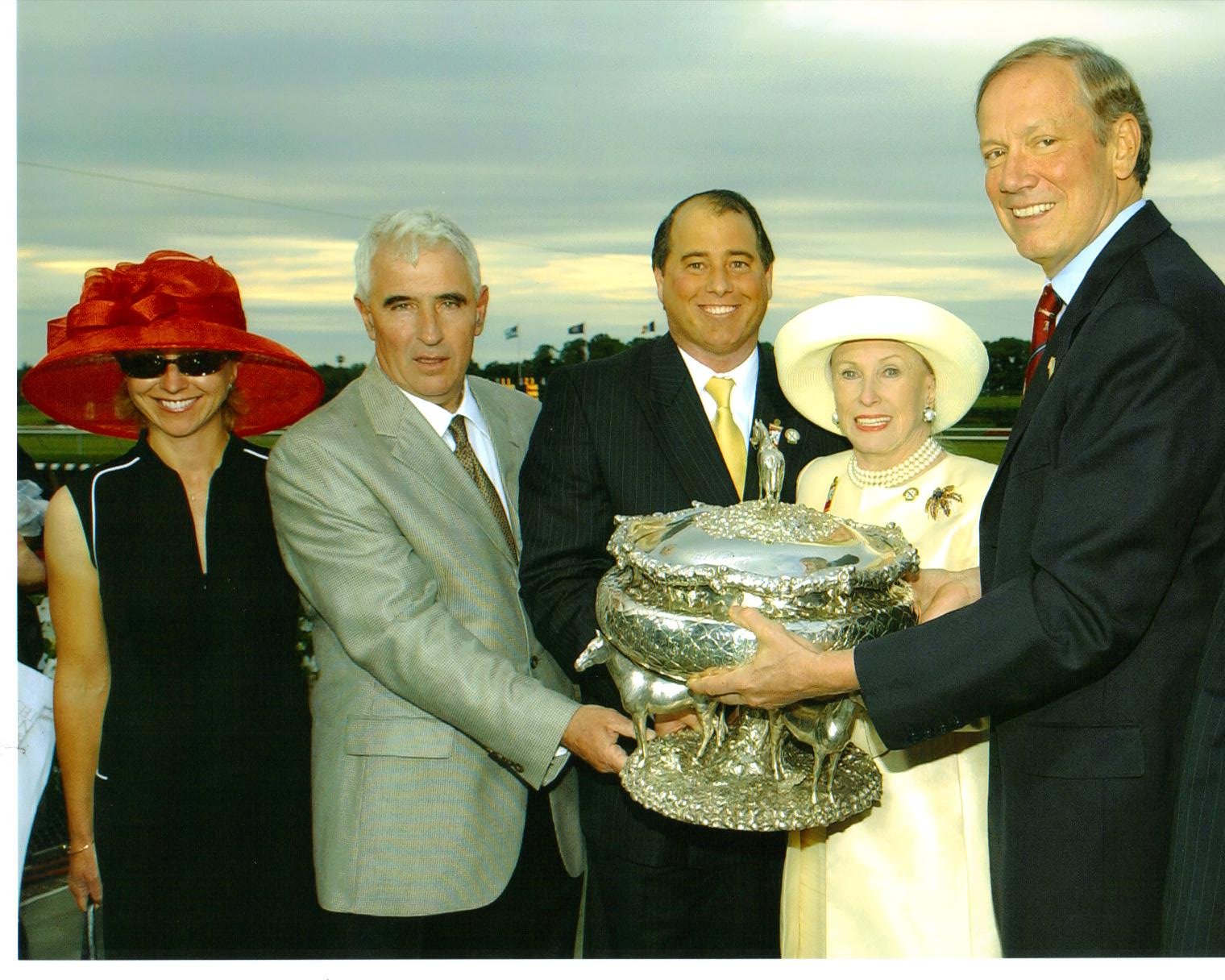
Receiving the August Belmont Trophy in 2004 for Birdstone's win in the Belmont Stakes from Governor George Pataki

When her colt Birdstone beat Smarty Jones in the 2004 Belmont Stakes, denying Smarty Jones the Triple Crown, she was apologetic. In 2009, when there was a suggestion that an owner could enter another horse to block the filly Rachel Alexandra from running in the Preakness Stakes, Whitney said that if needed, she would withdraw her own horse to make room for the filly.

Whitney was awarded the Eclipse Award of Merit in 2010, one of the thoroughbred industry's highest honors.

As Whitney was accepting the Eclipse Award of Merit, she was also honored by New York Governor Andrew Cuomo. Cuomo's mother, Matilda, presented Whitney with a citation proclaiming her officially "the Queen of Saratoga." This was the first citation Governor Cuomo had given.

In 2011, Whitney was elected to The Jockey Club. She was voted into the National Museum of Racing and Hall of Fame in 2019 as one of its esteemed Pillars of the Turf.

Whitney and John Hendrickson donated $2.5 million for the Marylou Whitney and John Hendrickson Cancer Facility for Women at the University of Kentucky Markey Cancer Center, for which over $44 million was raised by Whitney and others. The building was dedicated in Lexington, Kentucky, in December 2001 by officials from the University of Kentucky and the McDowell Cancer Foundation. The Marylou Whitney and John Hendrickson Cancer Facility for Women is 45,465 square feet (4,223.8 m^{2}) and opened in 2002. It provides multidisciplinary ambulatory care for women suffering from breast cancer, gynecologic cancers, and lung, hematologic, gastrointestinal and urologic cancers.

Whitney co-chaired an annual luncheon in Saratoga to raise funds to battle breast cancer for The Breast Cancer Research Foundation.

The Stroke Recovery Center at Cardinal Hill Rehabilitation Hospital in Kentucky is also named in honor of Whitney and Hendrickson for their support of that facility. Whitney was one of the first hosts of the annual Cardinal Hill Telethon and was involved with the hospital for over forty years.

The Headley-Whitney Museum received funds from Marylou and John for a new wing that is the home to exhibits from the Smithsonian Institution. The museum is also home of the Cornelia Vanderbilt Whitney Dollhouses and other jewelry owned by Whitney. John Hendrickson funded the new "Marylou Whitney Garden" at the museum as a replica of one of their personal gardens and presented it as an anniversary gift to Marylou. The Doll Houses have raised over half of a million dollars for charities, and the garden is the setting for many weddings and private parties.

Whitney contributed to organizations such as the Kentucky Aviation Museum and Sayre School. The elementary school is named in her honor.

Thank You Marylou, who was named to honor Marylou Whitney.

== Saratoga Springs ==
Marylou Whitney fell in love with Cady Hill and Saratoga Springs, New York, when C.V. Whitney first brought her there in the late 1950s. Marylou was instrumental in many philanthropic endeavors to support the town and its residents. As a founder of the National Museum of Dance and Hall of Fame, she helped raise over $1.5 million prior to the 1986 opening. The Hall of Fame is named after Marylou and C.V. Whitney. She had advocated for the museum since its inception. She was supportive of the Saratoga Hospital, where the cardiac catheterization lab is named in her honor. Whitney and her husband John also donated $1 million to the Radiation Oncology Center at the Saratoga Hospital. She was a founder of the Saratoga Performing Arts Center (SPAC) and she helped underwrite the New York City Ballet's summer residency at SPAC. Whitney was awarded the First Star on the Walk of Fame for her timeless efforts. She also supported the Saratoga YMCA, having the newly built pool named in her honor. During the Saratoga Race Meet, she was the Honorary Chair and hosted numerous charities during the season as well.

Whitney suffered a stroke in early 2006, which seriously curtailed her activities in Saratoga during the 2006 meet (late July through early September) where traditionally she was a leading social figure. She and her husband initiated the Backstretch Appreciation program to benefit backstretch workers who work at Saratoga Race Course. Each night an activity is scheduled for the 2,000 employees such as dinners, bingo, movie, karaoke and a learn English night. Whitney and Hendrickson donated much time and money to this effort.

In the mid-1980s, she asked C.V. Whitney that for her birthday he install air conditioning in the Canfield Casino, since she did not want her guests to suffer the heat at her annual ball. Along with the Whitney Gala each year, the building is used for many fundraisers, weddings and other activities that benefit the community. In 2015, Marylou and her husband, John Hendrickson, donated the cost to build Centennial Park in Saratoga Springs as a gift to the city for its 100th anniversary.

== Adirondacks ==
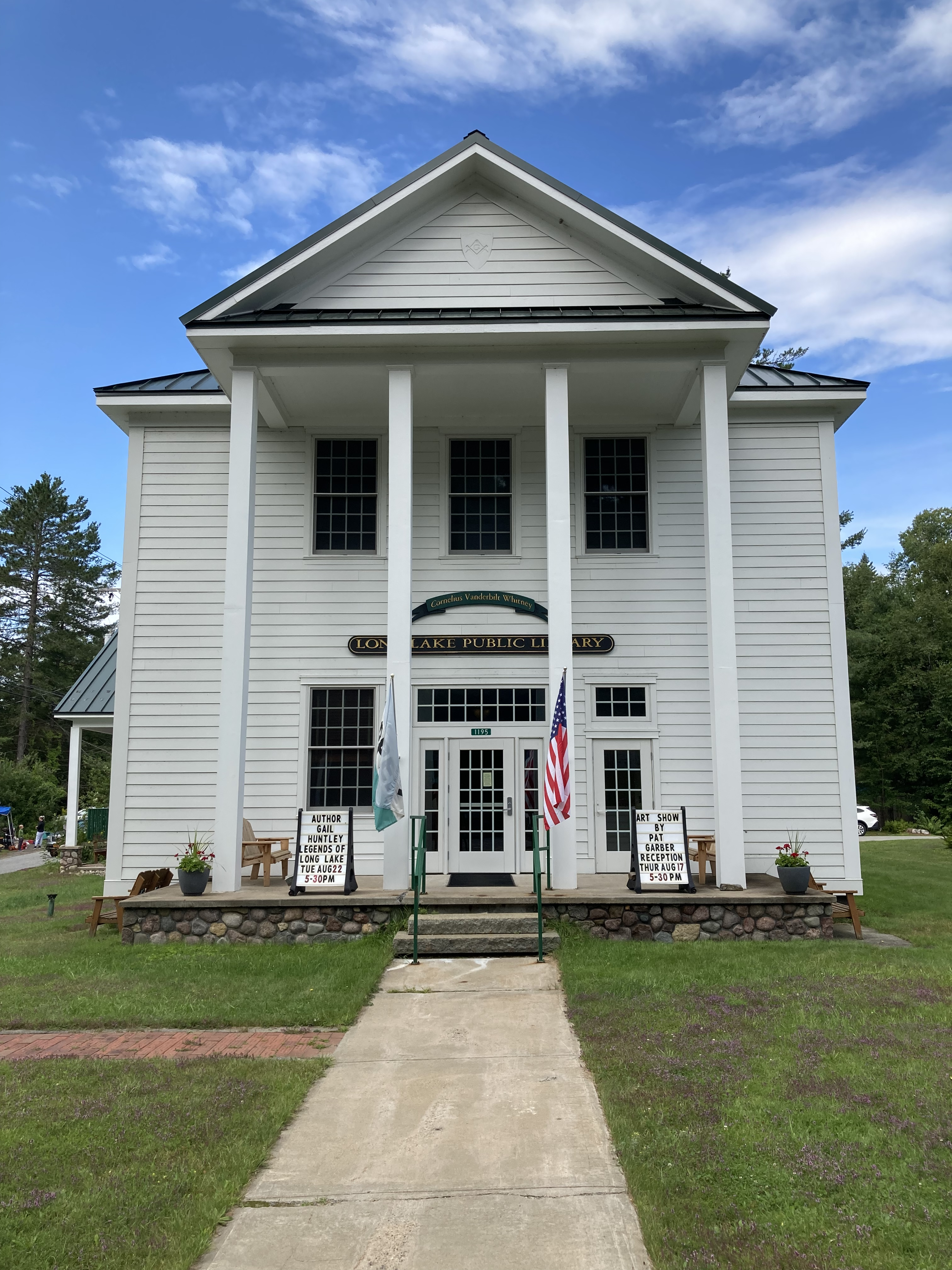
The Cornelius Vanderbilt Whitney Library in Long Lake, New York.

Marylou Whitney was the largest private landowner in the state of New York by owning Whitney Park.

Whitney had ties to the Long Lake area in the Adirondacks. Upon CV's death in 1992, Marylou inherited Whitney Industries, a large gravel and lumber business with 51,000 acres (210 km^{2}) of critical Adirondack real estate. With John Hendrickson taking the lead in negotiations, some 14,700 acres (59 km^{2}) were sold to New York State for $17.1 million, after initially seeking rights to develop 40 exclusive shoreline estates on the western stretch of the Whitney Estate. Environmentalists strongly advocated New York State to purchase 14,700 acres. The acquired lands are called the William C. Whitney Wilderness Area.

On July 16, 2007, Marylou and John donated $250,000 to the Long Lake Library, a gift of five times the library's operating budget. In celebration of the gift, the library was renamed The Cornelius Vanderbilt Whitney Long Lake Library. The Marylou Whitney Medical Complex in Long Lake, New York, was also dedicated in her honor for her devotion to their needs. She is also a supporter of the Long Lake United Methodist Church.

== New York City ==
In New York City, Whitney was one of the first supporters and largest underwriters of the USO. She was honored as USO Woman of the Year for her financial support and her support during World War II at which time she hosted a radio show called "Private Smiles". The show aired around the world from Kansas City. Her show was reported to have a better rating than her dear friend, Walter Cronkite.

In a nod to Marylou's radio persona, C.V. Whitney later named a race horse "Pvt Smiles." Pvt Smiles competed against Secretariat in the 1973 Belmont Stakes

== American Sportscasters Association (ASA) ==
Whitney, an ASA member, served as Honorary Dinner Chairman of the American Sportscasters Association's eighth annual Hall of Fame Dinner (December 3, 1992) and their ninth annual dinner (December 2, 1993). Both events were held at the Marriott Marquis Hotel in New York City.

In 1992, Whitney served alongside Michael J. Roarty, former vice president of marketing for Anheuser Busch (General Chairman); U.S. representative Jack Kemp (Honorary Co-chairman); Senator Bill Bradley (Honorary Co-chairman); ASA president Lou Schwartz (Dinner Chairman); and boxing champion José Torres (Journal Chairman). The master of ceremonies for the event was veteran talk show host Larry King.

The honorees included: Vin Scully (Hall of Fame Inductee); Bob Costas (Sportscaster of the Year Award); Bud Greenspan (Graham McNamee Award); Arthur Ashe (Sports Legend Award); and John Madden (Sports Personality of the Year).

There was also a tribute to the "Voice of the Brooklyn Dodgers" Red Barber, who died that year, by former broadcasting partners Mel Allen and Vin Scully.

In 1993, Whitney once again served as Dinner Chairman along with Mike Roarty (General Chairman), and Lou Schwartz (Dinner Chairman). ABC's Robin Roberts was the evening's Introductions Host, ASA Chairman Dick Enberg served as Host, and ASA Board of Director Jon Miller was the Master of Ceremonies.

The honorees included: Howard Cosell (Hall of Fame Inductee); Marty Glickman (Hall of Fame Inductee); Bob Costas (Sportscaster of the Year Award); Merle Harmon (Graham McNamee Award); and A. J. Foyt (Sports Legend Award).

The ASA also gave out a special "Upset of the Year" Award to recognize the stunning victory of racehorse Lil E. Tee, a 17 to 1 longshot that won the Kentucky Derby that year. Whitney, along with Chicago Cubs announcer Jack Brickhouse, made the presentation to David Downs, who was Vice President of Sports Programming at ABC Sports at the time, for their live coverage of the event.

Some of the celebrity guests at the events included: New York Yankees great Yogi Berra, sportscasting legend Curt Gowdy; WWE President Vince McMahon; former Dodgers Manager Tommy Lasorda; "Voice of Boxing" Don Dunphy; Metropolitan Opera singer Robert Merrill; NBA Commissioner David Stern; former President of NBC Sports Dick Ebersol; Boston Celtics play-by-play announcer Tommy Heinsohn; former Brooklyn Dodgers pitcher Ralph Branca; world-renowned artist LeRoy Neiman; NBC Sportscasters Don Criqui and Charlie Jones; Rachel Robinson, wife of Brooklyn Dodgers great Jackie Robinson; former Miss America and actress Mary Ann Mobley; founder of the Guardian Angels Curtis Sliwa and many others.

== Other interests ==
Whitney had many residences, including her "Cady Hill" estate in Saratoga Springs New York; a massive camp in the Adirondack Mountains; a farm near Lexington, Kentucky; a winter home in Florida; an apartment in New York City; and a residence in Alaska, the home state of her third husband.

The Buffalo Bill Historical Center in Cody, Wyoming, was important to Whitney, and she supported The Whitney Gallery of Western Art. She donated over $1 million to the museum in the years following C.V. Whitney's death to continue to expand the museum which he initially built.

The St. Augustine area in Florida was also of interest to Whitney, as C. V. Whitney founded Marineland, and she continued to financially support The Whitney/Hendrickson Marine Lab in honor of her late husband in the years following his death. Whitney was a member of the Historic St. Augustine Preservation Board in the early 1970s, and for her efforts in restoring downtown St. Augustine, Florida, the government of Spain awarded her the Order of Isabel the Catholic. While in St. Augustine, Whitney helped to plan the famed Easter Parade.

In addition to her devotion to many organizations, Whitney enjoyed many other activities. She was an active spectator of polo and presented the Whitney Cup to Prince Charles and Geoffrey Kent's Polo Team at Cirincester on June 24, 1990. She continued to present the Whitney Cup at Whitney Field in Saratoga Springs each year.

Whitney was the largest private donor to the 1980 Olympic Winter Games held in Lake Placid, New York.

Whitney also had interest in dog-sled racing. She flew from Anchorage to Nome, monitoring her dogs and her sponsored musher, Martin Buser, along the Iditarod Trail Sled Dog Race numerous times. She has been known to rough it with the other spectators and enjoys the dogs and the people.

== Recognitions ==
In 2010 a specially bred, long-stem pink tea rose, hybridized by Canadian rose breeder Brad Jalbert, was named in Whitney's honor. A gift for her 85th birthday from her husband John, the "Marylou Whitney Rose" was meant to be the showcase rose in the "Marylou Whitney Rose Garden" at Congress Park near the entrance of the Canfield Casino.

The Marylou Whitney Rose was also planted in the Yaddo Rose Garden in Saratoga Springs, New York. The gift of the rose was accompanied by a $10,000 donation from Mrs. Whitney and her husband John Hendrickson to help with the upkeep of the gardens.

Churchill Downs in Louisville, Kentucky, honored her as "First Lady of the Oaks" in 2015 for her dedication to such causes as women's health, equine well-being and philanthropic endeavors that benefit the racing community.

== Death ==
Marylou Whitney died July 19, 2019. Her formal funeral arrangements were kept confidential. A few days after her death, Whitney was buried at Greenridge Cemetery in Saratoga Springs, NY. Her burial date was kept restricted to close friends and family. On the day of her burial, all the entrances to the cemetery were closed off to all visitors by the Saratoga Springs Police.
