= 2004 Kentucky Derby =

Horse race

130th Kentucky Derby
- Kentucky Derby
- Location: Churchill Downs
- Date: May 1, 2004
- Winning horse: Smarty Jones
- Winning time: 2:04.06
- Starting price: 4-1
- Jockey: Stewart Elliott
- Trainer: John Servis
- Owner: Someday Farm
- Conditions: Sloppy
- Surface: Dirt
- Attendance: 140,054

The 2004 Kentucky Derby was the 130th running of the Kentucky Derby. The race took place on May 1, 2004, and was won by Smarty Jones, who earned a $5 million bonus. There were 140,054 in attendance.

== Contenders ==
Smarty Jones was the 4-1 favorite for the race. He came into the Derby with an undefeated record, including wins in the Rebel Stakes and Arkansas Derby, both held at Oaklawn Park. If he won the Kentucky Derby, he stood to earn a $5 million "Centennial Bonus" offered by Oaklawn to celebrate its 100th anniversary.

His leading rivals included Lion Heart (Hollywood Futurity, 2nd in Blue Grass Stakes), Castledale (Santa Anita Derby), The Cliff's Edge (Blue Grass Stakes), Tapit (Wood Memorial), Friends Lake (Florida Dery), and Imperialism (San Rafael, 2nd in Santa Anita Derby).

St. Averil and Wimbledon were originally entered but scratched from the race, meaning there were only 18 starters.

== Full results ==
A "deluge" started about two hours before the race, turning a fast track sloppy. Lion Heart, breaking near the rail, ran a quick opening quarter mile of 22.99 seconds to get good position going into the first turn. His jockey Mike Smith then started to slow down the pace, completing the half mile in 46.73 and three-quarters in 1:11.80. Smarty Jones rated a few lengths behind then started his move on the far turn. The two raced heads apart as they entered the stretch, then Smarty Jones started to edge away to win by 2 3/4 lengths.

Smarty Jones became the first horse to win the Derby while undefeated since Seattle Slew in 1977. It was the first Derby win for his trainer, jockey and owner, all of whom were well known in the Mid Atlantic racing circuit but making their first start in the race. His 77-year-old owner Roy Chapman also bred the colt at Someday Farm in Pennsylvania. Chapman and his wife Patricia had owned and bred many horses over the years, but none had raced at the highest level. "We had a lot of ham-and-eggers," he said, "but sometimes you can cheer just as loud and get just as excited about winning a $10,000 claimer as a stakes. But we never raced at this level until Smarty came along. To have bred him and had him born on your farm, it's something... He is from Philly and I'm very proud of everything he's done."

Finish	Program number	Horse	Jockey	Trainer	Odds	Margin	Earnings
1	15	Smarty Jones	Stewart Elliott	John Servis	4.10		$5,884,800*
2	3	Lion Heart	Mike E. Smith	Patrick Biancone	5.40	2 3/4 lengths	$170,000
3	10	Imperialism	Kent Desormeaux	Kristin Mulhall	10.90	6 lengths	$85,000
4	1	Limehouse	José A. Santos	Todd Pletcher	41.70	8 lengths	$45,000
5	11	The Cliff's Edge	Shane Sellers	Nicholas Zito	8.20	12 1/2 lengths	
6	4	Action This Day	David R. Flores	Richard Mandella	43.40	13 3/4 lengths	
7	14	Read the Footnotes	Robby Albarado	Richard Violette Jr.	22.50	14 3/4 lengths	
8	13	Birdstone	Edgar Prado	Nicholas Zito	21.20	15 1/4 lengths	
9	18	Tapit	Ramon A. Dominguez	Michael Dickinson	6.40	15 3/4 lengths	
10	12	Borrego	Victor Espinoza	Beau Greely	14.20	16 1/4 lengths	
11	2	Song of the Sword	Norberto Arroyo Jr.	Jennifer Pedersen	55.90	17 1/2 lengths	
12	8	Master David	Alex Solis	Robert Frankel	10.60	18 1/2 lengths	
13	19	Pro Prado	John McKee	Robert Holthus	53.50	20 lengths	
14	16	Castledale	Jose Valdivia Jr.	Jeff Mullins	21.90	25 1/4 lengths	
15	6	Friends Lake	Richard Migliore	John C. Kimmel	18.50	36 3/4 lengths	
16	7	Minister Eric	Pat Day	Richard Mandella	22.50	37 1/4 lengths	
17	17	Pollard's Vision	John Velazquez	Todd Pletcher	24.00	40 3/4 lengths	
DNF	20	Quintons Gold Rush	Corey Nakatani	Steve Asmussen	51.20	--	

- Smarty Jones earnings included a $5 million racing series bonus

Track condition: Fast

Times: 1/4 mile – 22.99; 1/2 mile – 46.73; 3/4 mile – 1:11.80; mile – 1:37.35; final – 2:04.06.
Splits for each quarter-mile: (22.99) (23.74) (25.07) (25.55) (26.71)

Source: Equibase Chart

== Payout ==
The 130th Kentucky Derby Payout Schedule

Program Number	Horse Name	Win	Place	Show
15	Smarty Jones	$10.20	$6.20	$4.80
3	Lion Heart	-	$8.20	$5.80
10	Imperialism	-	-	$6.20

- $2 Exacta: (15-3) Paid $65.20
- $2 Trifecta: (15-3-10) Paid $987.60
- $2 Superfecta: (15-3-10-1) Paid $41,380.20

== Subsequent racing careers ==
Several horses went on to win Grade I races:

- Smarty Jones – Preakness Stakes
- Lion Heart – Haskell Invitational
- Birdstone – Belmont Stakes, Travers Stakes
- Borrego – 2005 Pacific Classic, Jockey Club Gold Cup
- Castledale – 2005 Shoemaker Mile

== Subsequent breeding careers ==
=== Sires of Classic winners ===
Tapit – leading sire in North America 2014-2016

- Tonalist – 2014 Belmont Stakes, Jockey Club Gold Cup, 2015 Cigar Mile, Jockey Club Gold Cup
- Creator – 2016 Belmont Stakes, Arkansas Derby
- Tapwrit – 2017 Belmont Stakes
- Untapable – 2014 Kentucky Oaks, Mother Goose Stakes, Cotillion, Breeders' Cup Distaff, 2015 Apple Blossom
- Frosted – 2015 Wood Memorial, 2016 Metropolitan Handicap, Whitney Stakes

Birdstone

- Mine That Bird – 2009 Kentucky Derby
- Summer Bird – 2009 Belmont Stakes, Travers Stakes, Jockey Club Gold Cup
- Noble Bird – 2015 Stephen Foster Handicap

Pollard's Vision

- Blind Luck – 2010 Kentucky Oaks, Las Virgenes Stakes, Alabama Stakes, 2009 Oak Leaf Stakes, Hollywood Starlet, 2011 Vanity Handicap

=== Sires of Grade I winners ===
Lion Heart

- Dangerous Midge – 2010 Breeders' Cup Turf
- Lion of David – 2010 Arkansas Derby
- Bradester – 2016 Stephen Foster Handicap
- Tom's Tribute – 2014 Eddie Read Stakes

Imperialism

- Imperial Hint – 2017 and 2018 Alfred G. Vanderbilt, Vosburgh

Read the Footnotes

- Rightly So – 2010 Ballerina Stakes
Sources: American Classic Pedigrees, Equibase, Blood-Horse Stallion Register, Racing Post
