= I'll Get Along (horse) =

American-bred Thoroughbred racehorse

- Sire: Smile
- Grandsire: In Reality
- Dam: Don't Worry About Me
- Damsire: Foolish Pleasure
- Sex: Mare
- Foaled: March 11, 1992 (age 33)
- Country: United States
- Colour: Chestnut
- Breeder: Frances A. Genter Stable
- Owner: Coolmore Stud
- Trainer: Bob Camac
- Record: 39: 12-10-8
- Earnings: $277,009

I'll Get Along (foaled March 11, 1992, in Kentucky) is a Thoroughbred racehorse by champion sprinter Smile and out of the stakes-winning Foolish Pleasure mare Don't Worry Bout Me, tracing tail-female to the mother of all blue hens, La Troienne. She was selected and purchased for Roy and Patricia Chapman by trainer Bob Camac for $40,000 at the 1993 Keeneland September yearling sale.

Trained by Camac, I'll Get along was a stakes winner of $277,009 but is best known as a broodmare through her mating to Elusive Quality that produced Smarty Jones, the 2004 Kentucky Derby and Preakness Stakes winner who was voted American Champion Three-Year-Old Male Horse honors.

In 2004, I'll Get Along was sold for $5,000,000 to Gaines-Gentry Thoroughbreds, then in foal with an Elusive Quality filly. At Coolmore Stud in Ireland, she was bred to Champion sire, Sadler's Wells. She has since produced a second stakes winner, the turf sprinter filly Smartys Emperoress by Holy Roman Emperor.

== Progeny ==
- Be Happy My Love (PA), 1999 filly by Formal Gold;
- Smarty Jones (PA), 2001 colt by Elusive Quality;
- Sippin' Bourbon (FL), 2003 colt by Hennessy - shipped to Australia;
- Speedy Jones (FL), 2004 colt by Orientate;
- Elusive Moment (KY), 2005 filly by Elusive Quality;
- Maytide (IRE), 2006 colt by Sadler's Wells;
- Attractive (IRE), 2007 filly by Sadler's Wells;
- Smartys Emperoress (KY), 2008 filly by Holy Roman Emperor;
- Gointobegone (KY), 2009 filly by Smart Strike;
- Cuadrante (KY), 2010 colt by Henrythenavigator
