= Rock Hard Ten =

American-bred Thoroughbred racehorse

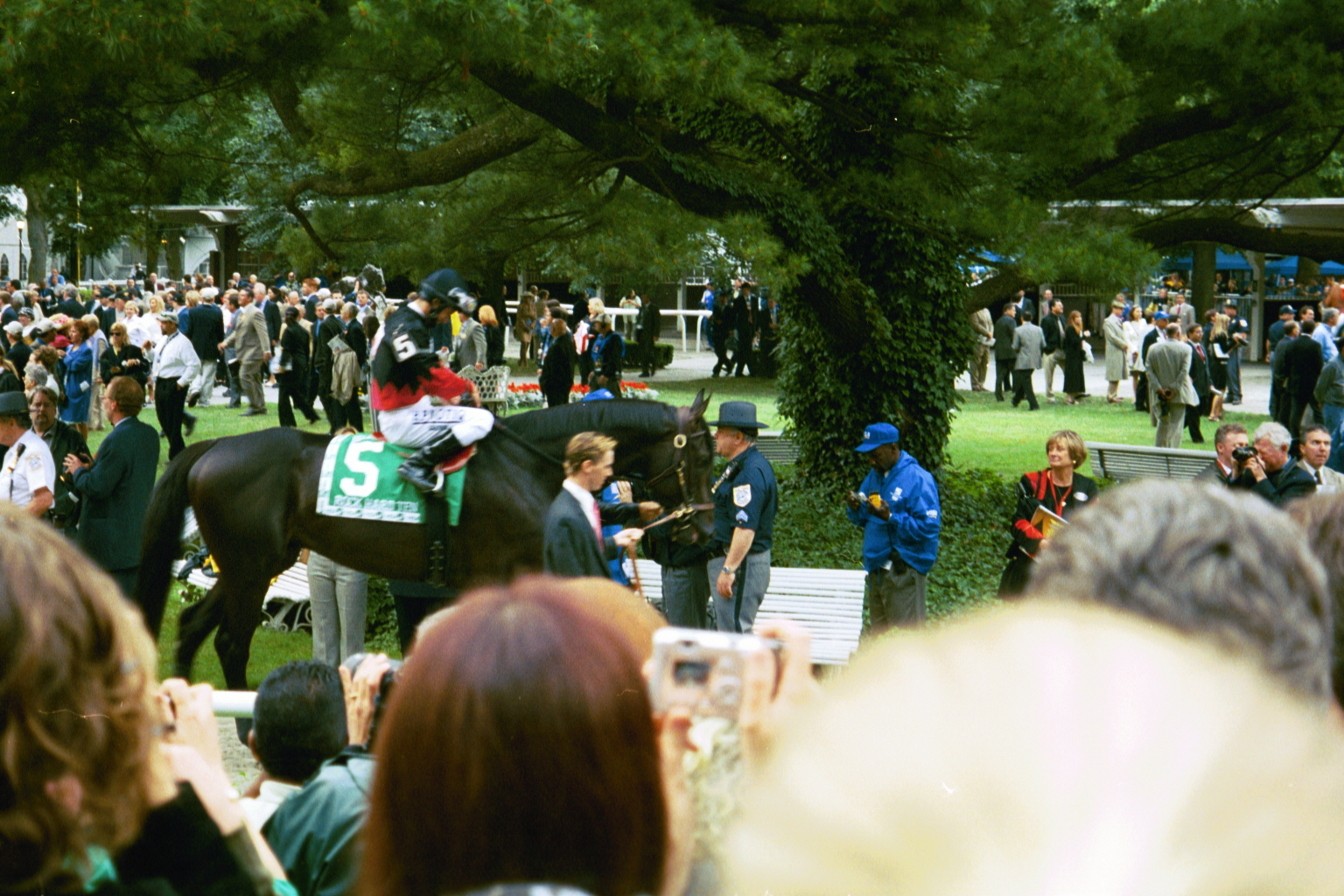
- Rock Hard Ten at 2004 Belmont Stakes
- Sire: Kris S.
- Grandsire: Roberto
- Dam: Tersa
- Damsire: Mr. Prospector
- Sex: Stallion
- Foaled: April 5, 2001
- Died: November 12, 2021
- Country: United States
- Color: Dark Bay
- Breeder: Madeleine A. Paulson
- Owner: Mercedes Stable
- Trainer: Jason Orman; Richard Mandella
- Record: 11: 7-1-1
- Earnings: US$1,870,380

Major wins
- Swaps Stakes (2004); Malibu Stakes (2004); Charles H. Strub Stakes (2005); Santa Anita Handicap (2005); Goodwood Breeders' Cup Handicap(2005) American Classic Race placing: Preakness Stakes 2nd (2004)

Rock Hard Ten (April 5, 2001 – November 12, 2021) was an American thoroughbred racehorse and sire. Co-owned and bred by Madeleine Paulson, widow of Allen E. Paulson, the dark bay horse stood over 17 hands. He was sired by Kris S., out of the Mr. Prospector mare Tersa.

== Three-year-old season ==
Rock Hard Ten was a late bloomer and did not race at age two due to shin splints. At age three, he started late in relation to other three-year-olds. Rock Hard Ten stepped up in class four weeks before the Kentucky Derby in the GI Santa Anita Derby and finished second to Castledale but was disqualified and placed third for interference. Due to the late start in the season and his disqualification, Rock Hard Ten did not have enough graded stakes race earnings to qualify for the Kentucky Derby.

The owners of Rock Hard Ten waited two weeks later until the Preakness Stakes. In that race, the colt faced the top four finishers from the Derby, including the eventual champion and dual classic winner, Smarty Jones. In the 2004 Preakness Stakes, Rock Hard Ten was fractious behind the gate and difficult to load. When the gates opened, he broke alertly and jockey Gary Stevens placed him fourth in a field of ten runners. On Pimlico's club house turn, jockey Mike Smith aboard Derby runner-up Lion Heart floated Smarty Jones out wide and in turn pushed the others horses even further outside. Rock Hard Ten was the most affected, pushed out to the six path on the turn and fading to seventh. Stevens wrestled with Rock Hard Ten, fighting to hold him back and conserve ground. On the second turn, he and Eddington made a charge at the leaders. The two moved up to challenge Lion Heart at the top of the lane. Rock Hard Ten then passed Lion Heart for the place spot, holding on to earn $200,000 as the Preakness runner-up. Smarty Jones won the race by the widest margin in 130 years at 11-1/2 lengths.

Following the Preakness, Rock Hard Ten won the GII Swaps Stakes in July at Hollywood Park and the GI Malibu Stakes in December at Santa Anita Park. Rock Hard Ten ran in the Belmont.

== Four-year-old season ==
At age four, Rock Hard Ten developed physically into one of the largest colts to hit the track in history, standing 17.3 hands. That season, he won the grade two Charles H. Strub Stakes, then one of the biggest prizes for an older horse in the grade one Santa Anita Handicap, and then the grade two Goodwood Breeders' Cup Handicap. He finished his career with an in-the-money percentage of 82%. Out of eleven starts, he won seven, placed once, and came in third once.

== Retirement ==
Rock Hard Ten stood at stud at Lane's End Farm in Versailles, Kentucky from 2006 until 2012. He was then sold to the Korea Racing Authority (KRA) in South Korea and stood at their Jeju Stud Farm starting with the 2013 breeding season.

Rock Hard Ten died in South Korea on November 12, 2021. According to the KRA, he was moved to an equine hospital after being unable to stand in his paddock and died within 24 hours. The death was reported several days later once it was listed in official KRA records. At the time of his death, Rock Hard Ten had sired 330 winners with his offspring earning more than $27 million in purse money.

== Pedigree ==
Pedigree of Rock Hard Ten (USA), bay stallion, 2001
Sire Kris S. (USA) 1977	Roberto (USA); 1969	Hail To Reason	Turn-To
Sire Kris S. (USA) 1977	Roberto (USA); 1969	Hail To Reason	Nothirdchance
Sire Kris S. (USA) 1977	Roberto (USA); 1969	Bramalea	Nashua
Sire Kris S. (USA) 1977	Roberto (USA); 1969	Bramalea	Rarelea
Sire Kris S. (USA) 1977	Sharp Queen (USA); 1965	Princequillo	Prince Rose
Sire Kris S. (USA) 1977	Sharp Queen (USA); 1965	Princequillo	Cosquilla
Sire Kris S. (USA) 1977	Sharp Queen (USA); 1965	Bridgework	Occupy
Sire Kris S. (USA) 1977	Sharp Queen (USA); 1965	Bridgework	Feale Bridge
Dam Tersa (USA) 1986	Mr Prospector (USA); 1970	Raise A Native	Native Dancer
Dam Tersa (USA) 1986	Mr Prospector (USA); 1970	Raise A Native	Raise You
Dam Tersa (USA) 1986	Mr Prospector (USA); 1970	Gold Digger	Nashua
Dam Tersa (USA) 1986	Mr Prospector (USA); 1970	Gold Digger	Sequence
Dam Tersa (USA) 1986	Peacefully (USA); 1973	Jacinto	Bold Ruler
Dam Tersa (USA) 1986	Peacefully (USA); 1973	Jacinto	Cascade
Dam Tersa (USA) 1986	Peacefully (USA); 1973	Morning Calm	Hail To Reason
Dam Tersa (USA) 1986	Peacefully (USA); 1973	Morning Calm	Yellow Mist (Family: A1)
