= Mercedes Stable =

Mercedes Stables LLC is an American Thoroughbred racing stable founded in November 2000. Substantially all of the interest in Mercedes Stables is held by Ernest W. Moody, a Las Vegas gaming entrepreneur. Mercedes Stables was majority partner in ownership of Rock Hard Ten (Madeleine A. Paulson, now Pickens, held a minority share). Among the many good horses campaigned exclusively by Mercedes Stables have been G1 winner and millionaire Seattle Smooth, G2 winner Indian Ocean, track record holder and stakes winner Indian Way, and homebred G3 winner Run It.
