= Stewart Elliott =

American thoroughbred jockey

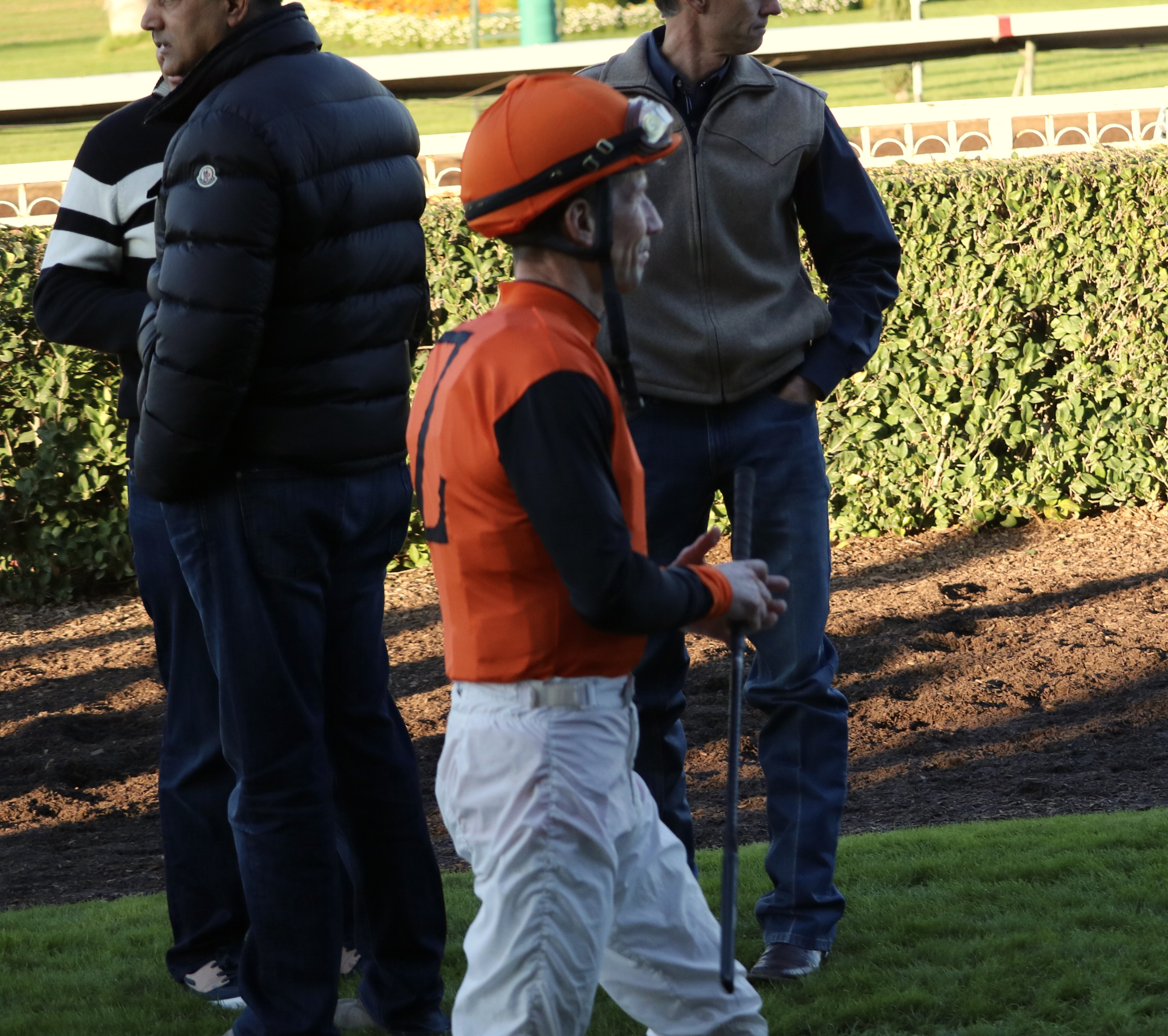
- Elliott in 2016

Personal information
- Born: March 1, 1965 (age 61) Toronto, Ontario, Canada
- Occupation: Jockey

Horse racing career
- Sport: Horse racing
- Career wins: 6,000 (ongoing)

Major racing wins
- Melaleuca Stakes (1990); Demoiselle Stakes (1999); Arkansas Derby (2004); Frank J. De Francis Memorial Dash (2004); Maryland Million Classic (2004); Remsen Stakes (2004); Sorority Stakes (2004, 2005); Tempted Stakes (2004); Acorn Stakes (2005); Fantasy Stakes (2005, 2006); Blue Hen Stakes (2006); Azeri Breeders' Cup Stakes (2006); Essex Handicap (2006); Southwest Stakes (2007); Affectionately Handicap (2008); Astoria Stakes (2008); Long Branch Stakes (2008); Woodbine Oaks (2009); Turf Monster Handicap (2013); Smarty Jones Stakes (Parx Racing) (2013) American Classic Race wins: Kentucky Derby (2004); Preakness Stakes (2004)

Racing awards
- ABC NEWS Person of the Week (2004); Best Jockey ESPY Award (2004); Avelino Gomez Memorial Award (2010); George Woolf Memorial Jockey Award (2017)

Significant horses
- Smarty Jones, Round Pond, Teuflesberg, Milwaukee Appeal
- Updated on July 15, 2007

Stewart Elliott (born March 1, 1965) is a Canadian jockey in thoroughbred horse racing.

Elliott was born in Toronto, Ontario, Canada. He grew up in horse racing; his father was a jockey for many years, his mother rode show horses and was a riding instructor, and his uncle owns a racing stable in Canada. At age seven, his family moved to race in Hong Kong, where they remained for six years before going to the United States. Stewart began riding professionally at age 16, mainly at Philadelphia Park Racetrack, a small racetrack in suburban Philadelphia, Pennsylvania. He has been the racetrack's most successful jockey for a number of years and for the past three seasons has been named Pennsylvania's top rider. On May 13, 2003, he reached a prestigious milestone, riding his 3,000th career winner. On January 18, 2009, he won the 4,000th race of his career at Philadelphia Park. In 2006, Elliott's son, Christopher Elliott, was born. The younger Elliott has been a professional jockey since 2024.

On May 1, 2004, Elliott became the first jockey in twenty-five years to win the Kentucky Derby in his first appearance in the race. His horse, Smarty Jones, became the first unbeaten Derby winner since Seattle Slew in 1977. To add to his victory was Elliott's 10% share of the almost $6 million in purse and bonuses that represented the largest payday for any jockey and horse in racing history. Two weeks later, Elliott rode Smarty Jones to a record-breaking win in the second leg of the Triple Crown of Thoroughbred Racing, the Preakness Stakes. In the Belmont Stakes, the third leg, Elliott took Smarty Jones out early in the backstretch, and Birdstone passed him late in the race. Some have criticized Elliott's ride, saying he "pushed" the horse too early in the race, but other experts have said: "he was doing the only thing he could do to win the race."

During his breakthrough year in 2004, he won 262 races out of 1,363 mounts with earnings of $14,533,061.

In 2005, he won 143 races out of 860 mounts with earnings of $5,393,661.

On January 11, 2008, Elliott rode four winners on one racecard at Aqueduct Racetrack.

On June 1, 2010, Woodbine Entertainment announced that Elliott had been voted the Avelino Gomez Memorial Award for his contribution to the sport of Thoroughbred racing.

In 2017 Stewart Elliott was voted the George Woolf Memorial Jockey Award, a prestigious honor voted on by thoroughbred horse racing jockeys in North America. It is given to a jockey who has demonstrated high standards of personal and professional conduct, on and off the racetrack.

On August 9, 2020, Elliot became the 36th North American jockey to have won more than 5,000 races.

== Year-end charts ==
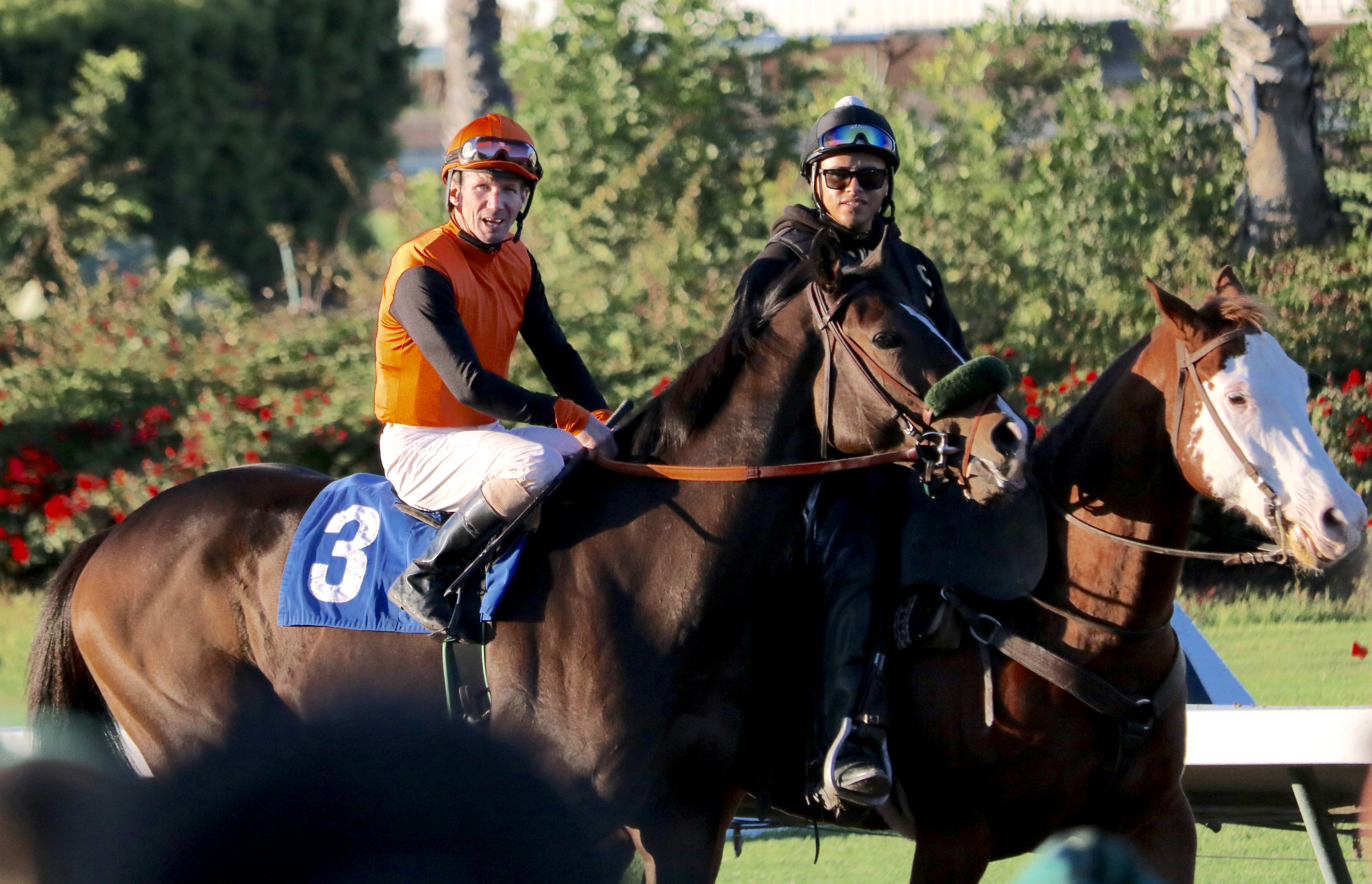
Elliott at Los Alamitos Racetrack, 2016

Chart (2001–present)	Peak position
National Earnings List for Jockeys 2001	76
National Earnings List for Jockeys 2002	70
National Earnings List for Jockeys 2003	66
National Earnings List for Jockeys 2004	5
National Earnings List for Jockeys 2005	35
National Earnings List for Jockeys 2006	52
National Earnings List for Jockeys 2007	38
National Earnings List for Jockeys 2008	29
National Earnings List for Jockeys 2009	50
National Earnings List for Jockeys 2010	40
National Earnings List for Jockeys 2011	45
National Earnings List for Jockeys 2012	64
National Earnings List for Jockeys 2013	75
