= Nick Zito =

American Thoroughbred horse trainer (born 1948)

Personal information
- Born: February 6, 1948 (age 78) New York City, New York, U.S.
- Occupation: Trainer

Horse racing career
- Sport: Horse racing
- Career wins: 2,060+ (ongoing)

Major racing wins
- American Classics wins: Kentucky Derby (1991, 1994); Preakness Stakes (1996); Belmont Stakes (2004, 2008); Breeders' Cup wins: Breeders' Cup Juvenile Fillies (1996); Breeders' Cup Juvenile (2007)

Honours
- United States Racing Hall of Fame (2005)

Significant horses
- Thirty Six Red, Strike the Gold, Louis Quatorze; Go for Gin, Storm Song, Birdstone; Albert the Great, Unbridled's Song, Bird Town, Commentator, Da' Tara, War Pass
- Updated on July 7, 2007

Nicholas Philip Zito (born February 6, 1948, in New York City, New York) is an American Thoroughbred horse trainer.

Zito began his career as a hot walker and worked his way up to a groom, to an assistant trainer, and to a trainer. His first top level horse was Thirty Six Red with which he won the 1990 Grade 1 Wood Memorial Stakes and earned a second-place finish in that year's Belmont Stakes. Nick Zito went on to win the Preakness once, and the Kentucky Derby and Belmont Stakes twice. He got his big break in 1991 when he won his first Kentucky Derby on Strike the Gold.

He was inducted into the National Museum of Racing and Hall of Fame in 2005, a year that his stable won more than $8 million in purses. Zito has also trained the 1996 U.S. Champion2-Year-Old Filly Storm Song as well as Bird Town who was voted the 2003 U.S. Champion 3-Year-Old Filly.

Nick Zito is a National Spokesperson and Honorary Director of the National Horse Protection Coalition. Zito and his wife, Kim, advocates for the just treatment of horses and are involved with the Thoroughbred Retirement Foundation.

Currently 2023 Nick Zito has partnered up with businessman, Robert S DiPippo. They have formed a company ZD Racing and horse management.

Other Graded stakes race wins (partial list):

- Blue Grass Stakes : 1991, 1998, 2004
- Brooklyn Handicap (2001, 2006)
- Champagne Stakes : 1998, 1999, 2000, 2003, 2007
- Florida Derby : 2005, 2010, 2011
- Jockey Club Gold Cup : 2000
- Kentucky Oaks : 2003
- Pimlico Special Handicap : 1992, 1996
- Wood Memorial Stakes : 1990, 1999, 2005
