= Birdstone =

American-bred Thoroughbred racehorse

- Birdstone at Old Friends (2024)
- Sire: Grindstone
- Grandsire: Unbridled
- Dam: Dear Birdie
- Damsire: Storm Bird
- Sex: Stallion
- Foaled: 2001
- Country: United States
- Colour: Bay
- Breeder: Marylou Whitney Stables
- Owner: Marylou Whitney Stables
- Trainer: Nick Zito
- Record: 9: 5-0-0
- Earnings: $1,575,600

Major wins
- Champagne Stakes (2003); Travers Stakes (2004); Triple Crown race wins: Belmont Stakes (2004)

Awards
- NTRA "Moment of the Year" (2004)
- Last updated on June 18, 2007

Birdstone (foaled May 16, 2001) is an American Thoroughbred racehorse best known for winning the 2004 Belmont Stakes and has become a successful sire.

On August 28, 2020, Birdstone was pensioned from stud duty to Old Friends in Georgetown, Kentucky, where he will be accessible to his fans from all over the world.

== Background ==
Owned and bred by Marylou Whitney of Whitney family racing fame, Birdstone was sired by Grindstone, winner of the 1996 Kentucky Derby, who in turn was sired by Unbridled, who won the 1990 Kentucky Derby. Unbridled was in turn sired by Fappiano, a son of Mr. Prospector, the tail-male ancestor of the vast majority of winners of Triple Crown races in recent years (22 out of the 24 races 1998–2005).

Birdstone's dam, Dear Birdie, was 2004 Broodmare of the Year, and produced 12 stakes winning foals, including Bird Town (by Cape Town), who won the 2003 Kentucky Oaks.

Bird Town would later go on to produce graded stakes winner Bird Song (by Unbridled's Song).

== Racing career ==
As a juvenile, Birdstone won the Champagne Stakes, a leading race for two-year-olds, at Belmont Park in 2003.

Beginning his sophomore season, Birdstone won an allowance and finished fifth in the Lane's End Stakes.

He was not a factor in the first two Triple Crown races (finishing eighth in the Kentucky Derby and skipping the Preakness Stakes) and was a 36-1 longshot when he upset the overwhelmingly favored Smarty Jones, taking the lead in the final furlong (201 m) in the fastest Belmont Stakes since the advent of modern electronic timing (2002 was the first year times were kept to hundredths).

Birdstone's victory represented the first in the Belmont for trainer Nick Zito, whose horses had finished second in that classic five times. In the winner's circle after the Belmont Stakes, his owners apologized to the connections of Smarty Jones for winning, as did jockey Edgar Prado.

The next major race for Birdstone was the Travers Stakes, which he won being the fourth betting choice at 5-1. He was Zito's first Travers champion.

== Retirement and stud career ==
Birdstone's retirement from racing after suffering a bone chip at the Breeders' Cup was announced on November 4, 2004. He began his career as a stallion at Gainesway Farm in Lexington, Kentucky.

His first starter was the colt Shoe Strap (Birdstone – Boot Strap by Storm Boot), who first went to post on May 21, 2008, at Churchill Downs and was trained by D. Wayne Lukas.

From his first crop of foals to race, Birdstone sired Mine That Bird, who had several wins as a two-year-old gelding before winning the 2009 Kentucky Derby as a three-year-old. Another of Birdstone's top runners was Summer Bird, who upset Mine That Bird in the 2009 Belmont Stakes (later winning the Jockey Club Gold Cup). His first crop also included Birdrun, who set the Belmont track record at a mile and a sixteenth.

Birdstone was one of the top ten ranked freshman sires of 2008 with 11 winners out of 22 starters and stood for $10,000 for the remainder of the 2009 season, despite his first-crop success. His 2010 stud fee was posted as $30,000 but by 2017 it had fallen to $5,000. Birdstone has sired 31 black-type runners, 20 stakes winners, 8 graded stakes winners, and has amassed progeny earnings over $21 million.

Birdstone's most notable progeny includes:

- Summer Bird: Won Belmont Stakes, Travers Stakes, Jockey Club Gold Cup, 2009 Eclipse Champion 3 Year Old Colt.
- Mine That Bird: Won Kentucky Derby, Grey Stakes, 2008 Canadian Champion Juvenile Male.
- Noble Bird: Won Stephen Foster Handicap, Pimlico Special, Fayette Stakes.
- Birdrun: Won Brooklyn Handicap.
- Blue Tone: Won San Gabriel Stakes.
- Thank You Marylou: Won Dogwood Stakes, multiple graded stakes placed. Breeders' Cup placed.
- Florida Won: Won Ontario Derby and Seagram Cup Stakes.
- Swipe: Won Juvenile Championship Stakes, multiple graded stakes placed. Breeders' Cup Placed.

Birdstone was pensioned from stud duties after the 2020 breeding season and was retired to Old Friends to live out the rest of his days.
