= Smarty Jones =

American-bred Thoroughbred racehorse

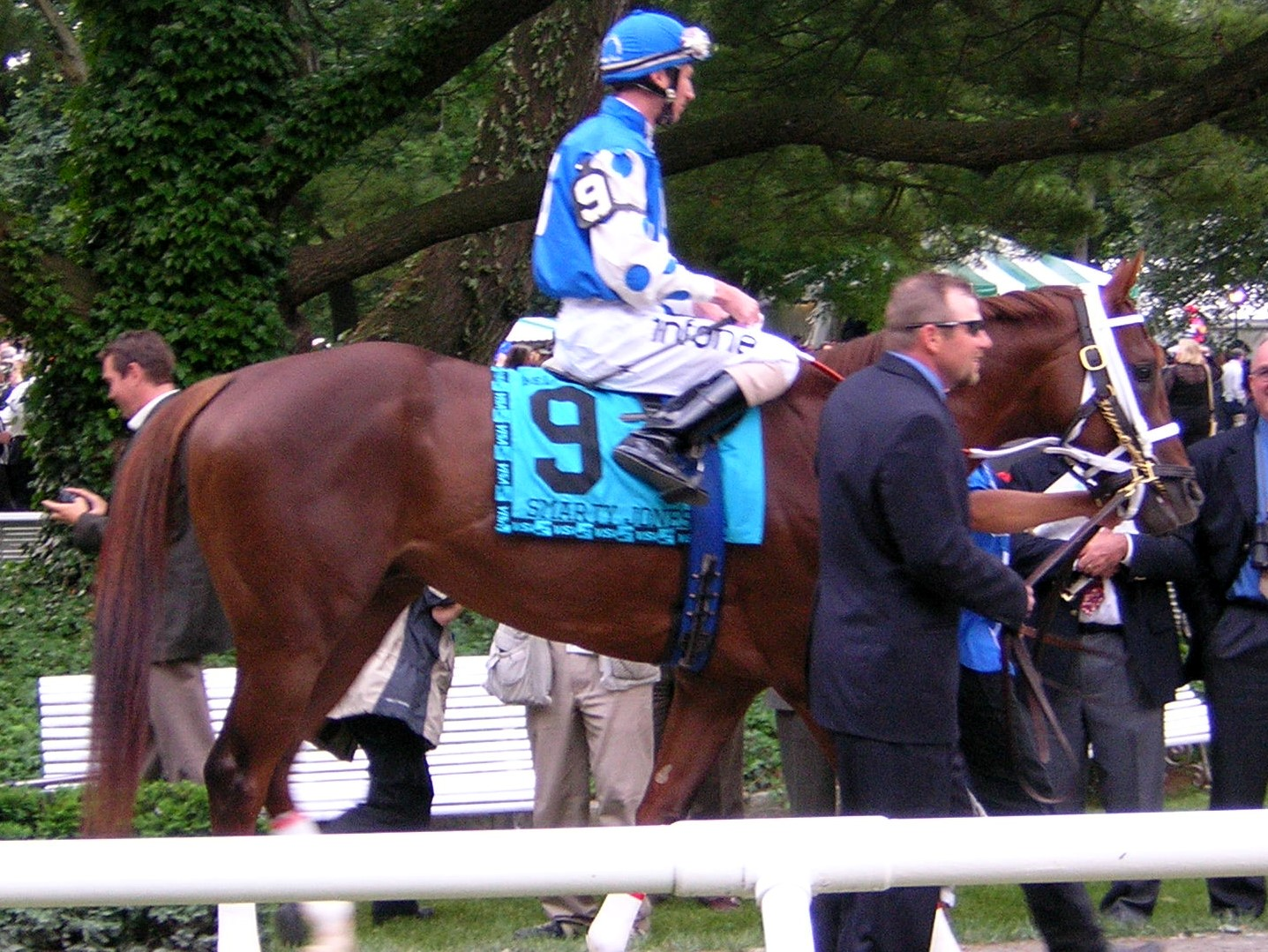
- Smarty Jones at the 2004 Belmont Stakes
- Sire: Elusive Quality
- Grandsire: Gone West
- Dam: I'll Get Along
- Sex: Stallion
- Foaled: 2001
- Country: United States
- Colour: Chestnut
- Breeder: Someday Farm
- Owner: Roy and Patricia Chapman
- Trainer: John Servis
- Record: 9: 8-1-0
- Earnings: $7,613,155

Major wins
- Count Fleet Stakes (2004); Southwest Stakes (2004); Rebel Stakes (2004); Arkansas Derby (2004); Triple Crown race wins: Kentucky Derby (2004); Preakness Stakes (2004)

Awards
- U.S. Champion 3-Yr-Old Colt (2004)

Honors
- Smarty Jones Stakes at Oaklawn Park; Smarty Jones Stakes at Parx Racing and Casino; National Museum of Racing and Hall of Fame (2025)

Smarty Jones (February 28, 2001) is a champion Thoroughbred racehorse who won the 2004 Kentucky Derby and Preakness Stakes and came second in the Belmont Stakes. He is currently the second-oldest living Kentucky Derby winner, after Silver Charm.

== Pedigree ==
Smarty Jones is a third-generation descendant of Mr. Prospector, and as such Smarty Jones is related to many Triple Crown hopefuls including Funny Cide, Afleet Alex, and Fusaichi Pegasus. Also included in his pedigree are Triple Crown winners Secretariat, Count Fleet, War Admiral, Gallant Fox and Omaha, and Classic race winners Northern Dancer, Foolish Pleasure and Man o' War.

== Early Ownership ==
Smarty Jones is the product of Pat and Roy "Chappy" Chapman's winningest horse, the multiple-stakes-winning mare I'll Get Along, and the record-setting sprinter Elusive Quality. He was born in February 2001 at Fairthorne Farm in Chester County, Pennsylvania. His Dosage Index of 3.40 suggested that he might be capable of competing in the classics.

He was named after Milly "Smarty Jones" McNair, the mother of co-owner Pat Chapman. The two shared a birthday, and Mrs. Chapman wanted to honor her late mother. She said the horse was a strong-willed actor from birth and her mother too was a bit of a smart aleck as a child who had gotten the nickname "Smarty."

== Training ==
The Chapmans originally hired Bobby Camac to train Smarty Jones, but in December 2001, Camac and his wife were murdered by Camac's stepson, Wade Russell, who was eventually convicted and sentenced to 28 years in prison. "It was a total shock, numbing," Roy Chapman said. "We didn't know what to do next."

This tragedy, combined with Roy Chapman's failing health, resulted in the Chapmans' decision to disband their small breeding operation, retaining only Smarty Jones and another horse. By 2003, Chapman had sold the Someday Farm property and moved into a smaller home, training only four horses.

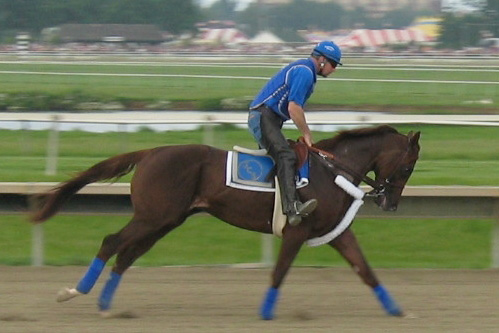
Smarty Jones working at Parx Racing

In 2002, Smarty Jones was sent to Bridlewood Farm in Ocala, Florida, to prepare for racing.

In 2003, the Chapmans selected John Servis as Smarty Jones' trainer. On July 27, 2003, Servis was schooling Smarty Jones at the starting gate when the colt spooked, reared, and smashed his head on the top of the gate. He fell to the ground unconscious, blood pouring from his nostrils. Servis thought the horse was dead, but Smarty Jones regained consciousness and was treated by Dr. Dan Hanf, who stopped the hemorrhaging and treated him for shock. After the bleeding stopped, the colt's head began to swell from the middle of his forehead over to his left eye. Dr. Hanf and assistant trainer Maureen Donnelly kept watch on the horse and kept him at the barn overnight. Hanf had seen the eye before the swelling and was confident the eye itself was not damaged but knew the horse must have sustained a fracture due to the excessive swelling.

The colt was sent the next day, July 28, 2003, to the New Jersey Equine Clinic for x-rays. There he was diagnosed with a fractured skull. The bones around his left eye were so badly damaged that the veterinarians thought they might have to remove the eye. Smarty Jones overcame his injuries after three weeks in the hospital and spent more than a month recuperating on the farm. Two of the other entrants in the 2004 Kentucky Derby lacked sight in one eye, and Smarty Jones could have been the third.

== Racing career ==
=== 2003: Two-Year-Old Season ===
Servis led Smarty Jones back into training and by early November 2003, the colt had recovered completely and was ready to make his racing debut at nearby Philadelphia Park, now known as Parx Casino and Racing, a racetrack in Bensalem Township, Pennsylvania, a suburb of Philadelphia.

Canadian-born jockey Stewart Elliott was hired to ride Smarty Jones for the Bensalem race but took over a more permanent position when the horse began his winning streak. Elliot had won 3,300 races and was the son of jockey Dennis Elliott.

Smarty Jones won the six-furlong (.75 mile)(1.21 km) race by 7 3/4 lengths.

Two weeks later, he won the Pennsylvania Nursery Stakes by 15 lengths, earning the best speed figure of his generation and among the best of any Derby winner as a 2-year-old.

=== 2004: Three-Year-Old Season ===
Now racing as a three-year-old, Smarty Jones was given his first major test in the Count Fleet Stakes at Aqueduct Racetrack in New York City in January 2004. In the home stretch, the colt pulled away from the field to win by five lengths.

In February, Smarty Jones was shipped to Oaklawn Park racetrack in Hot Springs, Arkansas. Now in earnest preparation for the Kentucky Derby, he won the Southwest Stakes in February, the Rebel Stakes in March, and the Arkansas Derby in April. In the Rebel Stakes, Smarty Jones earned the fastest Thorograph number that had ever been given to a three-year-old.

2004 was the 100th anniversary of the Triple Crown race series.

==== Kentucky Derby ====
On a rainy May 1, 2004, Smarty Jones won the Kentucky Derby as the post-time favorite. He became the first unbeaten winner of the race since Seattle Slew in 1977. Servis and Elliott became the first trainer/jockey combination in 25 years to win the Kentucky Derby in their debut appearance. Smarty Jones won the race by 2 3/4 lengths, earning $854,800 for the Chapmans along with a bonus of $5 million from Oaklawn Park for sweeping the Rebel Stakes, the Arkansas Derby, and the Kentucky Derby. He also joined Lil E. Tee (1992 Derby winner) as the only Pennsylvania-bred horses to ever win the Kentucky Derby.

==== Preakness Stakes ====
On May 15, 2004, Smarty Jones won the 2004 Preakness Stakes by a record margin of 11 1/2 lengths. He was the first odds-on favorite to win the second leg of the Triple Crown since Spectacular Bid in 1979.

After his Preakness victory, Smarty Jones' popularity increased massively. He became, arguably, the #1 fan favorite to aspire to win the Triple Crown since Affirmed won it in 1978. He was the 10th horse since Affirmed to win both the Derby and the Preakness. His popularity increased the attendance of the Belmont by 17,000 people and caused the highest television ratings in 14 years. Breeders made offers for the breeding rights to the horse, going as high as 40 to 50 million dollars.

In the weeks between the Preakness and Belmont, many speculated against the stallion's distance abilities. Although he ranked among the most brilliantly fast 2- and 3-year-olds of recent years, the 1 1/2-mile distance of the Belmont might prove too far for his miler/sprinter pedigree and running style.

Smarty Jones carried a record-high $59,000,000 betting pool for the Preakness Stakes, which doubled in amount during the Belmont Stakes.

==== Belmont Stakes ====
On June 5, 2004, Smarty Jones finished second in the Belmont Stakes, upset by a late charge by 36-1 long shot Birdstone. Unlike the Derby Preakness, Smarty Jones failed to relax and set a blistering pace on the front end. Birdstone, with a more distance-favoring pedigree, rallied from well off the pace. This was the first (and only) time in his career Smarty Jones was passed in a race.

Speculation arose that the loss was a result of Elliott allowing Smarty Jones to assume the lead too early when being challenged by several competitors. Race video revealed that Elliott had a tight hold on the reins and did not urge Smarty Jones until the quarter pole. Neither Servis nor the Chapmans ever blamed the jockey.

Others pointed to Smarty Jones' relatively unfavorable 3.40 Dosage Index as being a portent of his inability to successfully negotiate the 1 1/2-mile Belmont distance (Birdstone's Dosage Index was 1.77; the lower the Dosage number, supposedly the better suited a horse is to longer races). Smarty Jones ran the opening mile and a quarter in a time that would have won all but three Kentucky Derbys in history and was eight lengths in front of the third-placed horse, Royal Assault. The 120,139 in attendance at Belmont Park that day marked the largest crowd ever to see a sporting event in New York.

==== Career End ====
The Belmont was Smarty Jones' only loss out of nine starts. The end of his racing career was announced on August 2, 2004, due to chronic bruising of his ankle bones. Smarty Jones finished his career with 8 wins and one place in nine starts, earning $2,613,155. He also earned a $5 million bonus from Oaklawn Park. His total earnings were $7,613,155.

Smarty Jones was voted the 2004 Eclipse Award for Outstanding Three-Year-Old Male Horse and was one of the top five searched words/terms on Google for that year.

Quote by Smarty Jones' stable foreman, "Big Bill" Foster: "Number one in horse racing, you have to have the horse. Number two, you have to know what to do with the horse once you have him. A lot of people in this business have a lot of horses, and never made it because they broke them down. It happens a lot. Mismanaged. Mistrained. All because people want to be in the limelight. Which is where we're different. We don't want to be in the limelight."

== Stud career ==
=== Three Chimneys Farm ===
Smarty Jones at Three Chimneys Farm

Smarty Jones' breeding rights were sold to a group of investors for $60,000,000 and he entered stud in 2005. He stood at Three Chimneys Farm in Midway, Kentucky. At one point, he occupied the same stall that had previously housed Triple Crown winner Seattle Slew.

He initially stood for a fee of $100,000. In 2008, his stud fee was reduced to $65,000, then to $7,500 in 2010.

=== Calumet Farm ===
For the 2016 breeding season, Smarty Jones was relocated to Calumet Farm in Lexington, Kentucky, after shipping to Uruguay for the Southern Hemisphere season.

=== Equistar Farm ===
In 2019, he was sold to Rodney Eckenrode's Equistar Farm near Annville TWP., Pennsylvania, and has continued his breeding duties. His stud fee was announced at $3,500. He remains on active stud duty as of 2025.

=== Progeny ===
Smarty Jones' first foals were born in 2006 and began racing in 2008. He has sired numerous graded stakes winners:

- Backtalk - winner of the 2009 GIII Bashford Manor Stakes at Churchill Downs and GII Sanford Stakes at Saratoga Racecourse and a stallion at Bridlewood in Florida
- Centralinteligence - winner of the 2013 GI Triple Bend Handicap (bred by Pat Chapman, breeder/owner of Smarty Jones)(Smarty Jones' first Grade 1 win as a sire)
- Nasa - won the 2014 Pennsylvania Nursery Stakes (the same race his sire won in 2003), for Someday Farm and Patricia Chapman
- Better Life - Singapore Derby winning filly
- Keiai Gerbera - Japanese record setter
- Smart DNA - Panama Champion
- Bamba y Bamba - Uruguayan Champion 2-year-old

== Fame & Legacy ==
A carousel horse of Smarty Jones at Glen Echo Park

Smarty Jones has been referred to as "The People's Horse" or "America's Horse".

Smarty Jones appeared on the May 10, 2004, cover of Sports Illustrated.

A documentary, "The Ride of a Lifetime—The Smarty Jones Story", was shown for the first time on September 20, 2024, at Parx Racing.

New Yorker and rapper Wiki released a single entitled "Smarty Jones" as part of the two-song release, "Fee Fi Fo Fum b/w Smarty Jones" on October 18, 2019.

As of 2025, an early Kentucky Derby prep at Oaklawn named in his honor, the Smarty Jones Stakes.

A Labor Day race at Parx Racing and Casino was inaugurated in 2010 in his honor; the race was a replacement for the Pennsylvania Derby, which moved to the final Saturday in September. Parx has also embraced a "Smarty Jones Day" to honor the racer.

On August 1, 2025, Smarty Jones was inducted into the National Museum of Racing and Hall of Fame in Saratoga Springs, N.Y.

== Race record ==
Date	Age	Distance	Race	Grade	Track	Odds	Field	Finish	Winning Time	Winning (Losing) Margin	Jockey	Ref
Nov 9, 2003	2	6 furlongs	Maiden Special Weight	Maiden	Philadelphia Park	*1.10	10	1	1:11.19	7 3/4 lengths	Stewart Elliott	
Nov 22, 2003	2	7 furlongs	Pennsylvania Nursery Stakes	Black Type	Turf Paradise	*0.70	11	1	1:21.88	15 lengths	Stewart Elliott	
Jan 3, 2004	3	1 mile and 70 yards	Count Fleet Stakes	Listed	Aqueduct	*0.40	7	1	1:41.42	5 lengths	Stewart Elliott	
Feb 28, 2004	3	1 Mile	Southwest Stakes	Listed	Oaklawn Park	*0.50	9	1	1:37.57	3/4 lengths	Stewart Elliott	
Mar 20, 2004	3	1 1/16 miles	Rebel Stakes	Listed	Oaklawn Park	3.50	9	1	1:42.07	3 1/4 lengths	Stewart Elliott	
Apr 10, 2004	3	1 1/8 miles	Arkansas Derby	II	Oaklawn Park	*1.00	11	1	1:49.41	1 1/2 lengths	Stewart Elliott	
May 1, 2004	3	1 1/4 miles	Kentucky Derby	I	Churchill Downs	*4.10	18	1	2:04.06	2 3/4 lengths	Stewart Elliott	
May 15, 2004	3	1 3/16 miles	Preakness Stakes	I	Pimlico	*0.70	10	1	1:55.59	11 1/2 lengths	Stewart Elliott	
Jun 5, 2004	3	1 1/2 miles	Belmont Stakes	I	Belmont Park	*0.35	9	2	2:27.50	(1 length)	Stewart Elliott	

== Pedigree ==
Pedigree of Smarty Jones
Sire Elusive Quality	Gone West	Mr. Prospector	Raise a Native
Sire Elusive Quality	Gone West	Mr. Prospector	Gold Digger
Sire Elusive Quality	Gone West	Secrettame	Secretariat
Sire Elusive Quality	Gone West	Secrettame	Tamerett
Sire Elusive Quality	Touch of Greatness	Hero's Honor	Northern Dancer
Sire Elusive Quality	Touch of Greatness	Hero's Honor	Glowing Tribute
Sire Elusive Quality	Touch of Greatness	Ivory Wand	Sir Ivor
Sire Elusive Quality	Touch of Greatness	Ivory Wand	Natashka
Dam I'll Get Along	Smile	In Reality	Intentionally
Dam I'll Get Along	Smile	In Reality	My Dear Girl
Dam I'll Get Along	Smile	Sunny Smile	Boldnesian
Dam I'll Get Along	Smile	Sunny Smile	Sunny Sal
Dam I'll Get Along	Don't Worry Bout Me	Foolish Pleasure	What a Pleasure
Dam I'll Get Along	Don't Worry Bout Me	Foolish Pleasure	Fool-Me-Knot
Dam I'll Get Along	Don't Worry Bout Me	Stolen Base	Herbager
Dam I'll Get Along	Don't Worry Bout Me	Stolen Base	Bases Full

== See also ==
- List of racehorses
