= John Servis =

American Thoroughbred racehorse trainer (born 1958)

Personal information
- Born: October 25, 1958 (age 67) Charles Town, West Virginia
- Occupation: Trainer

Horse racing career
- Sport: Horse racing
- Career wins: 2,000+ (ongoing)

Major racing wins
- Horatius Stakes (1998); Demoiselle Stakes (1999); Selima Stakes (1999); Alabama Stakes (2000); Black-Eyed Susan Stakes (2000); Coaching Club American Oaks (2000); Cotillion Handicap (2000); Delaware Oaks (2001); Miss Woodford Stakes (2002, 2014); Oceanport Stakes (2002); John B. Campbell Handicap (2003); Maryland Racing Media Stakes (2003, 2018); Nellie Morse Stakes (2003); Primonetta Stakes (2003); Arkansas Derby (2004); Count Fleet Stakes (2004); Nashua Stakes (2004); Rebel Stakes (2004); Remsen Stakes (2004); Southwest Stakes (2004); Acorn Stakes (2005); Fantasy Stakes (2005); Honeybee Stakes (2005); Miss Preakness Stakes (2010); Maryland Million Sprint Handicap (2013); Busher Stakes (2014); Davona Dale Stakes (2016); Forward Gal Stakes (2016); Azeri Stakes (2006); Kentucky Oaks (2016); Salvator Mile Handicap (2016); Barbara Fritchie Handicap (2018); Willa On the Move Stakes (2017); Frizette Stakes (2018) U.S. Triple Crown wins: Kentucky Derby (2004); Preakness Stakes (2004); Breeders' Cup wins: Breeders' Cup Juvenile Fillies (2018)

Racing awards
- Big Sport of Turfdom Award (2004); Parx Racing Leading Trainer (2018)

Significant horses
- Cathryn Sophia, Jaywalk, Jostle; Round Pond, Smarty Jones
- Updated on June 28, 2007

John C. Servis (born October 25, 1958, in Charles Town, West Virginia) is an American Thoroughbred racehorse trainer who was relatively unknown until May 2004 when his horse Smarty Jones won the Kentucky Derby. The colt then went on to win the Preakness Stakes further increasing Servis' reputation. Servis' Cathryn Sophia won 2016 Kentucky Oaks, winning by 2-3/4 lengths over Land Over Sea.

In 2018, Servis won his first Breeders' Cup race with Jaywalk in the Breeders' Cup Juvenile Fillies.

Servis trains horses primarily out of Parx Casino and Racing in Bensalem, Pennsylvania.

He was born into a family involved in the Thoroughbred racing industry. As a boy, he moved to Philadelphia, Pennsylvania, where his father worked as a jockey.

Servis trained his 1,000th winner on May 1, 2007, at Philadelphia Park.

John is also the brother of trainer Jason Servis and brother-in-law to Florida Thoroughbred trainer, Edward Plesa.
