= 1993 in sports =

1993 in sports describes the year's events in world sport.

== Alpine skiing ==
- Alpine Skiing World Cup
  - Women's overall season champion: Anita Wachter, Austria

== American football ==
- Super Bowl XXVII – the Dallas Cowboys (NFC) won 52–17 over the Buffalo Bills (AFC)
  - Location: Rose Bowl
  - Attendance: 98,374
  - MVP: Troy Aikman, QB (Dallas)
- Sugar Bowl:
  - The Alabama Crimson Tide won 34-13 over the Miami Hurricanes to win the national championship
- Bobby Dodd was inducted into the College Football Hall of Fame

== Association football ==
- February 24 – death of Bobby Moore, former England captain, from cancer
- May – Manchester United win the inaugural English Premier League title, their first league title in 26 years.
- UEFA Champions League – Olympique de Marseille defeats A.C. Milan 1–0. Marseille is later banned from defending their title the next year due to a corruption scandal.
- The Zambian national team are all killed in an air crash near Libreville, Gabon. The team was travelling to Senegal to play a qualifying match for the 1994 FIFA World Cup.

== Athletics ==
- February 11 – Irina Privalova sets a new women's 60m indoors world record
- August – 1993 World Championships in Athletics held in Stuttgart
- September – Qu Yunxia sets a World Record of 3:50.46 in the women's 1500 m
- September – Wang Junxia sets new world records of 29:31.78 in the women's 10,000 m and 8:06.11 in the women's 3000m

== Baseball ==
- The Colorado Rockies and Florida Marlins (now Miami Marlins) play their inaugural seasons (both are National League teams) as MLB expands for the first time in 16 seasons.
- Randy Myers saves 53 games for the Chicago Cubs, breaking Dave Righetti's record for left-handers.
- Lee Smith breaks the all-time save mark by recording his 358th save in a 9–7 win against the Los Angeles Dodgers on April 13
- World Series – The Toronto Blue Jays win 4 games to 2 over the Philadelphia Phillies. The Series MVP is Paul Molitor, Toronto. Joe Carter hit the second ever walk-off home run to end the 1993 World Series, the first by an American League player.

== Basketball ==
- NCAA Men's Basketball Championship –
  - North Carolina wins 77–71 over Michigan
- NBA Finals –
  - Chicago Bulls win 4 games to 2 over the Phoenix Suns to complete their first three-peat of the decade (see John Paxson). Michael Jordan announced his retirement on October 6, only to return seventeen months later.
- National Basketball League (Australia) Finals:
  - Melbourne Tigers defeated the Perth Wildcats 2–1 in the best-of-three final series.
- Eurobasket 1993 won by Germany

== Boxing ==
- March 13 – Michael Carbajal aka "Manitas De Piedra" comes off the floor twice to knock out Humberto González aka "Chiquita" in seven rounds and unify the world's Jr. Flyweight title in the fight of the year
- May 7 to 16 – World Amateur Boxing Championships held in Tampere, Finland
- September 6 to 12 – 30th European Amateur Boxing Championships held in Bursa, Turkey.

== Canadian football ==
- Grey Cup – Edmonton Eskimos win 33–23 over the Winnipeg Blue Bombers
- Vanier Cup – Toronto Varsity Blues won 37–34 over Calgary Dinos

== Cricket ==
- June 4 – Shane Warne bowls the so-called "Ball of the Century" to Mike Gatting in the first Test at Old Trafford
- The Ashes – Australia defeated England 4–0 in England

== Cycling ==
- Giro d'Italia won by Miguel Indurain of Spain
- Tour de France – Miguel Indurain of Spain
- UCI Road World Championships – Men's road race – Lance Armstrong of United States
- Hour record – Graeme Obree of Great Britain
- Hour record – Chris Boardman of Great Britain

== Dogsled racing ==
- Iditarod Trail Sled Dog Race Champion –
  - Jeff King won with lead dogs: Herbie & Kitty

== Field hockey ==
- Men's Champions Trophy: Australia

== Figure skating ==
- World Figure Skating Championships:
  - Men's champion: Kurt Browning, Canada
  - Ladies' champion: Oksana Baiul, Ukraine
  - Pairs' champions: Isabelle Brasseur & Lloyd Eisler, Canada
  - Ice dancing champions: Maya Usova & Alexander Zhulin, Russia

== Floorball ==
- European Cup:
  - Men's champion: Balrog IK
  - Women's champion: VK Rasket

== Gaelic Athletic Association ==
- Camogie
  - All-Ireland Camogie Champion: Cork
  - National Camogie League: Kilkenny
- Gaelic football
  - All-Ireland Senior Football Championship – Derry 1–14 died Cork 2–8
  - National Football League – Dublin 0–10 died Donegal 0–6 (replay)
- Ladies' Gaelic football
  - All-Ireland Senior Football Champion: Kerry
  - National Football League: Laois
- Hurling
  - All-Ireland Senior Hurling Championship – Kilkenny 2–17 died Galway 1–15

== Golf ==
Men's professional

- Masters Tournament – Bernhard Langer
- U.S. Open – Lee Janzen
- British Open – Greg Norman
- PGA Championship – Paul Azinger
- PGA Tour money leader – Nick Price – $1,478,557
- Senior PGA Tour money leader – Dave Stockton – $1,175,944
- Ryder Cup – United States won 15–13 over Europe in team golf.

Men's amateur

- British Amateur – Iain Pyman
- U.S. Amateur – John Harris
- European Amateur – Morten Backhausen

Women's professional

- Nabisco Dinah Shore – Helen Alfredsson
- LPGA Championship – Patty Sheehan
- U.S. Women's Open – Lauri Merten
- Classique du Maurier – Brandie Burton
- LPGA Tour money leader – Betsy King – $595,992

== Harness racing ==
- North America Cup – Presidential Ball
- United States Pacing Triple Crown races –
  1. Cane Pace – Riyadh
  2. Little Brown Jug – Life Sign
  3. Messenger Stakes – Riyadh
- United States Trotting Triple Crown races –
  1. Hambletonian – American Winner
  2. Yonkers Trot – American Winner
  3. Kentucky Futurity – Pine Chip
- Australian Inter Dominion Harness Racing Championship –
  - Pacers: Jack Morris
  - Trotters: Night Allowance

== Horse racing ==
- Julie Krone, the all-time leading female jockey, became the first woman ever to win a Triple Crown race when she rode Colonial Affair to victory in the Belmont Stakes.

Steeplechases

- Cheltenham Gold Cup – Jodami
- Grand National – race void

Flat races

- Australia – Melbourne Cup won by Vintage Crop
- Canadian Triple Crown Races:
  1. Queen's Plate won by Peteski
  2. Prince of Wales Stakes won by Peteski
  3. Breeders' Stakes won by Peteski
  - Peteski becomes the fourth horse in five years to sweep the series.
- France – Prix de l'Arc de Triomphe won by Urban Sea
- Ireland – Irish Derby Stakes, and Epsom Derby won by Commander in Chief
- Japan – Japan Cup won by Legacy World
- English Triple Crown Races:
  1. 2,000 Guineas Stakes – Zafonic
  2. The Derby – Commander in Chief
  3. St. Leger Stakes – Bob's Return
- United States Triple Crown Races:
  1. Kentucky Derby – Sea Hero
  2. Preakness Stakes – Prairie Bayou
  3. Belmont Stakes – Colonial Affair
- Breeders' Cup World Thoroughbred Championships:
  1. Breeders' Cup Classic – Arcangues
  2. Breeders' Cup Distaff – Hollywood Wildcat
  3. Breeders' Cup Juvenile – Brocco
  4. Breeders' Cup Juvenile Fillies – Phone Chatter
  5. Breeders' Cup Mile – Lure
  6. Breeders' Cup Sprint – Cardmania
  7. Breeders' Cup Turf – Kotashaan

== Ice hockey ==
- Art Ross Trophy as the NHL's leading scorer during the regular season: Mario Lemieux, Pittsburgh Penguins
- Hart Memorial Trophy for the NHL's Most Valuable Player: Mario Lemieux, Pittsburgh Penguins
- Stanley Cup – Montreal Canadiens win four games to one over the Los Angeles Kings
- World Hockey Championship
  - Men's champion: Russia defeated Sweden
  - Junior Men's champion: Canada won over Sweden
- Mighty Ducks of Anaheim (now Anaheim Ducks) play inaugural season.
- Florida Panthers play inaugural season.

== Kickboxing ==
The following is a list of major noteworthy kickboxing events during 1993 in chronological order.

Before 2000, K-1 was considered the only major kickboxing promotion in the world.

| Date | Event | Location | Attendance | Notes |
| March 30 | K-1 Sanctuary I | Tokyo, Japan | 2,100 | K-1's first event. At this time there were no unified rules in kickboxing; the rules used at this event would go on to be universally recognised. |
| April 30 | K-1 Grand Prix '93 | Tokyo, Japan | 12,000 | First ever K-1 World Grand Prix, a sixteen-man tournament featuring kickboxers of different nationalities and styles (such as full contact, muay Thai and karate). |
| June 25 | K-1 Sanctuary III | Osaka, Japan | 6,000 | |
| September 4 | K-1 Illusion | Tokyo, Japan | 13,500 | First K-1 event to feature a women's fight. |
| October 2, 3 | K-1 Illusion 1993 Karate World Cup | Osaka, Japan | | Featured a sixteen-man Kyokushin rules tournament held over two days. |
| November 15 | K-1 Andy's Glove | Osaka, Japan | 2,100 | |
| December 29 | K-2 Grand Prix '93 | Tokyo, Japan | 11,000 | Featured an eight-man light heavyweight (76–79 kg/167-174 lbs) tournament. |

== Lacrosse ==
- The Buffalo Bandits defeat the Philadelphia Wings to win the Major Indoor Lacrosse League championship

== Mixed martial arts ==
The following is a list of major noteworthy MMA events during 1993 in chronological order.

Before 1997, the Ultimate Fighting Championship (UFC) was considered the only major MMA organization in the world and featured much fewer rules then are used in modern MMA.

| Date | Event | Alternate Name/s | Location | Attendance | PPV Buyrate | Notes |
| November 12 | The Ultimate Fighting Championship | UFC 1: The Beginning | Denver, Colorado, United States | 2,800 | 86,000 | UFC's first event. This event was advertised to have "no rules" when in fact there were three main rules. This included, no biting, no eye-gouging, and no small joint manipulation. Fights could only end by knockout or submission. |

== Radiosport ==
- The Friendship Radiosport Games held in Victoria, British Columbia are the first international Amateur Radio Direction Finding competition ever held in Canada.

== Rugby league ==
- 1992-93 RFL Championship won by Wigan
- RL Challenge Cup tournament culminates in Wigan's 20–14 win over Widnes in the final at Wembley Stadium before 77,684
- 1993 State of Origin won by New South Wales in game two of the three-match series against Queensland at the Sydney Football Stadium before 41,895.
- 1993 NSWRL season culminates in a repeat of the previous year's grand final with the Brisbane Broncos again defeating the St George Dragons, this time 14–6 at the Sydney Football Stadium before 42,329.

== Rugby union ==
- 99th Five Nations Championship series is won by France

== Snooker ==
- World Snooker Championship – Stephen Hendry beats Jimmy White 18–5
- World rankings – Stephen Hendry remains world number one for 1993/94

== Swimming ==
- 21st European LC Championships, held in Sheffield, United Kingdom (August 3 – 8)
  - Germany wins the most medals (21), and the most gold medals (11)
- Third European Sprint Championships, held in Gateshead, United Kingdom (November 11 – 13)
  - Germany wins the most medals (17), Sweden the most gold medals (6)
- First World Short Course Championships, held in Palma de Mallorca, Spain (December 2 – 5)
  - United States and Australia win the most medals (21), China the most gold medals (10)
- February 17 – Mark Foster breaks the world record in the men's 50m freestyle (short course) at a swimming meet in Sheffield, United Kingdom, clocking 21.60.

== Taekwondo ==
- World Championships held in New York City, United States

== Tennis ==
- April 30 – during a changeover at a tournament in Hamburg, Germany, Monica Seles is stabbed in the back by a deranged fan of rival Steffi Graf. Seles would not play competitively for more than two years after the incident.
- Grand Slam in tennis men's results:
  1. Australian Open – Jim Courier
  2. French Open – Sergi Bruguera
  3. Wimbledon championships – Pete Sampras
  4. U.S. Open – Pete Sampras
- Grand Slam in tennis women's results:
  1. Australian Open – Monica Seles
  2. French Open – Steffi Graf
  3. Wimbledon championships – Steffi Graf
  4. U.S. Open – Steffi Graf
- Davis Cup of world tennis won by Germany 4–1 over Australia

== Triathlon ==
- ITU World Championships held in Manchester, United Kingdom
- ITU World Cup (nine races) started in Japan and ended in the United States Virgin Islands
- ETU European Championships held in Echternach, Luxembourg

== Volleyball ==
- Men's World League: Brazil
- Women's World Grand Prix: Cuba
- Women's European Championship: Russia

== Water polo ==
- Men's World Cup: Italy
- Men's European Championship: Italy
- Women's European Championship: Netherlands

== Multi-sport events ==
- First East Asian Games held in Shanghai, China
- Fourth World Games held in The Hague, Netherlands
- Central American and Caribbean Games held in Ponce, Puerto Rico
- Twelfth Mediterranean Games held in Languedoc-Roussillon, France
- Seventeenth Summer Universiade held in Buffalo, New York, United States
- Sixteenth Winter Universiade held in Zakopane, Poland

== Awards ==
- Associated Press Male Athlete of the Year – Michael Jordan, NBA basketball
- Associated Press Female Athlete of the Year – Sheryl Swoopes, College basketball
- ABC's Wide World of Sports Athlete of the Year: Evander Holyfield, American boxer
