= Aztec Hill =

American-bred Thoroughbred racehorse

- Sire: Proud Truth
- Grandsire: Graustark
- Dam: Tribal Hill
- Damsire: Cox's Ridge
- Sex: Mare
- Foaled: 1990
- Country: United States
- Colour: Bay
- Breeder: Loblolly Stable
- Owner: Loblolly Stable
- Trainer: Thomas Bohannan
- Record: 25: 8-4-1
- Earnings: $527,748

Major wins
- Black-Eyed Susan Stakes (1993); Fantasy Stakes (1993); Honeybee Stakes (1993); Busanda Stakes (1993); Sunbonnet Stakes (1993)
- Last updated on June 20, 2011

Aztec Hill (foaled in February 1990 in Kentucky) is an American Thoroughbred racehorse. The daughter of Proud Truth is probably best remembered for posting a half length score as the favorite over Traverse City in the mile and an eighth Grade II $200,000 Black-Eyed Susan Stakes at Pimlico Race Course on May 14, 1993. That win was the first half of only the second Black-Eyed Susan/Preakness Stakes Double won in history by the same trainer and owner combo.

== Racing career ==
In mid-January 1993, Aztec Hill won The Busanda Stakes at Aqueduct Racetrack run among three-year-old fillies at a mile and 70 yards under jockey Mike E. Smith in 1:42 2/5. Early in the spring, her trainer, Thomas Bohannan, shipped her to the southwest and won two consecutive graded stakes races at Oaklawn Park Race Track in Hot Springs, Arkansas. In early March, she won the grade three Honeybee Stakes run over a distance of 8.5 furlongs on dirt in 1:44.40 under jockey Aaron Gryder. In early April, she won the grade two Fantasy Stakes at one and one-sixteenth miles on the dirt at Oaklawn Park under her regular jockey, Mike E. Smith, in 1:44.20. On the first Friday of May, Aztec Hill acted up in the post parade and was very fractious in the gate at Churchill Downs. She never recovered as she finished a distant seventh in the Kentucky Oaks. Late in the year Aztec Hill won the Sunbonnet Stakes.

== Black-Eyed Susan Stakes ==
Mid-May turned out to be a very successful time of year for Aztec Hill's owners Loblolly Stable, as the Pimlico's odds maker made both Prairie Bayou the favorite in the Preakness Stakes and Aztec Hill the 3-1 favorite in the Grade II $200,000 Black-Eyed Susan Stakes. Both favorites won.

Aztec Hill beat a field of ten fillies, holding off late challenger Traverse City by a half-length. Jacody was a neck behind for third place. Aztec Hill's final time for the 8.5 furlongs was one minute, 49-3/5 seconds. Trainer Tom Bohannan said "Two weeks ago the gate got her in the Oaks and she didn't want to run, but today it was just the opposite, at Pimlico, She went into and came out with nothing but running on her mind."
