= 1993 Preakness Stakes =

118th running of the Preakness Stakes

118th Preakness Stakes
- The Preakness Stakes
- "The Second Jewel of the Triple Crown" "The Run for the Black-Eyed Susans"
- Location: Pimlico Race Course, Baltimore, Maryland, United States
- Date: May 15, 1993
- Winning horse: Prairie Bayou
- Jockey: Mike E. Smith
- Trainer: Thomas Bohannan
- Conditions: Fast
- Surface: Dirt

The 1993 Preakness Stakes was the 118th running of the Preakness Stakes thoroughbred horse race. The race took place on May 15, 1993, and was televised in the United States on the ABC television network. Prairie Bayou, who was jockeyed by Mike E. Smith, won the race by a half length over runner-up Cherokee Run. Approximate post time was 5:34 p.m. Eastern Time. The race was run over a fast track in a final time of 1:56-3/5. The Maryland Jockey Club reported total attendance of 97,641, this is recorded as second highest on the list of American thoroughbred racing top attended events for North America in 1993.

Union City, who did not finish this race due to injury, was euthanized as a result. This race's winner, Prairie Bayou, would run in the Belmont Stakes, fail to finish it, and be euthanized as well.

== Payout ==
The 118th Preakness Stakes Payout Schedule

Program Number	Horse name	Win	Place	Show
3	Prairie Bayou	US$6.40	$3.60	$3.40
12	Cherokee Run	-	$7.20	$5.20
2	El Bakan	–	–	$14.60

$2 Exacta: (3–12) paid $69.00

$2 Trifecta: (3–12–2) paid $2,258.60

== The full chart ==
Finish position	Margin (lengths)	Post position	Horse name	Jockey	Trainer	Owner	Post time odds	Purse earnings
1st	0	3	Prairie Bayou	Mike E. Smith	Thomas Bohannan	Loblolly Stable	2.20-1 favorite	$325,000
2nd	1/2	12	Cherokee Run	Pat Day	Frank A. Alexander	Jill Robinson	9.40-1	$100,000
3rd	7 1/2	2	El Bakan	Craig Perret	Alfredo Callejas	Robert Perez	51.40-1	$50,000
4th	7 3/4	1	Personal Hope	Gary Stevens	Mark A. Hennig	Debi & Lee Lewis	3.20-1	$25,000
5th	8 1/2	9	Sea Hero	Jerry Bailey	MacKenzie Miller	Rokeby Stable	4.30-1	
6th	9 1/2	7	Woods of Windsor	Rick Wilson	Ben W. Perkins Jr.	Mrs. Augustus Riggs	14.10-1	
7th	10 1/2	8	Rockamundo	Edgar Prado	Oris J. Glass Jr.	Gary & Mary West	9.70-1	
8th	11 1/2	10	Wild Gale	Shane Sellers	Michael J. Doyle	Little Fish Stable	22.80-1	
9th	12 1/2	4	Hegar	José Ferrer	Penny Lewis	Huntington Point Stable	68.10-1	
10th	19	11	Koluctoo Jimmy Al	Chris McCarron	Bruce N. Levine	Basil J. Piasteras	17.60-1	
11th	26 1/2	5	Too Wild	Herb McCauley	Nicholas P. Zito	William J. Condren	59.90-1	
12th	dnf	6	Union City	Pat Valenzuela	D. Wayne Lukas	Overbrook Farm	11.80-1	

- Winning Breeder: Loblolly Stable; (KY)
- Final Time: 1:56 3/5
- Track Condition: Fast
- Total Attendance: 97,641

== See also ==
- 1993 Kentucky Derby
