= Rebel Stakes =

- Class: Grade II
- Location: Oaklawn Park Race Track; Hot Springs, Arkansas, United States
- Inaugurated: 1961 (as Rebel Handicap)
- Race type: Thoroughbred - Flat racing
- Website: www.oaklawn.com

Race information
- Distance: 1 1/16 miles
- Surface: Dirt
- Track: left-handed
- Qualification: Three-year-olds
- Weight: 122 lbs with allowances
- Purse: $1,000,000 (2026)

The Rebel Stakes is a Grade II American Thoroughbred horse race for three-year-old horses held over a distance of one and one-sixteenth miles run on dirt each February at Oaklawn Park Race Track in Hot Springs, Arkansas. As of 2026, it offers a purse of $1,000,000. It is the second leg of Oaklawn's three-year-old stakes program, run after the Southwest Stakes and before the Arkansas Derby; it is also part of the Road to the Kentucky Derby.

== History ==
The race was first run on March 18, 1961, as the Rebel Handicap over a distance of one mile and seventy yards. It was won by Mrs. Vera E. Smith's Bass Clef in 1:42 2/5. The victory was Bass Clef's fifth in a row, a run that included the Louisiana Derby. Later in the spring, Bass Clef would finish third to Carry Back in the Kentucky Derby.

The event immediately became a preparatory event for the Arkansas Derby. The 1965 winner Swift Ruler won both races.

In 1984, the conditions of the event were changed from handicap to stakes allowance and the event was renamed the Rebel Stakes. That same year the distance was increased to one and one-sixteenth miles.

In 1990, the event was upgraded to Grade III. It was downgraded to Listed for the 2003 and 2004 runnings. It was upgraded in 2008 to a Grade II by the American Graded Stakes Committee.

Since 2013, the event has been part of the Road to the Kentucky Derby.

In 2019, the event was split into two divisions after Oaklawn president Louis Cella presented a sporting gesture after the San Felipe Stakes was abandoned in California. Road to Kentucky Derby qualification points for the first four finishers were adjusted.

== Records ==
Time record:

- 1 1/16 miles – 1:41.00 Vanlandingham (1984)
- 1 mile and 70 yards – 1:40.80 Betemight (1967)

Margins:

- 7 lengths – Etony (1968), Manastash Ridge (1989)

Most wins by an owner:

- 5 - Loblolly Stable (1980, 1984, 1987, 1992, 1993)

Most wins by a jockey:

- 5 - Mike E. Smith (1986, 1993, 1999, 2014, 2019)

Most wins by a trainer:

- 8 - Bob Baffert (2010, 2011, 2012, 2014, 2015, 2016, 2020, 2021)

Rebel Stakes – Arkansas Derby double:

- Swift Ruler (1965), Traffic Mark (1969), Promised City (1975), Temperence Hill (1980), Bold Ego (1981), Sunny's Halo (1983), Demons Begone (1987), Pine Bluff (1992), Victory Gallop (1998), Smarty Jones (2004), Lawyer Ron (2006), Curlin (2007), American Pharoah (2015), Omaha Beach (2019)

== Winners ==
Year	Winner	Jockey	Trainer	Owner	Distance	Time	Purse	Grade	Ref
Rebel Stakes
2026	Class President	John R. Velazquez	Todd A. Pletcher	WinStar Farm, First Go Racing & CHC	1 1/16 miles	1:43.21	$1,000,000	II	
2025	Coal Battle	Juan P. Vargas	Lonnie Briley	Norman Stables	1 1/16 miles	1:43.01	$1,250,000	II	
2024	Timberlake	Cristian A. Torres	Brad H. Cox	WinStar Farm	1 1/16 miles	1:44.00	$1,250,000	II	
2023	Confidence Game	James Graham	J. Keith Desormeaux	Don't Tell My Wife Stables	1 1/16 miles	1:44.21	$1,000,000	II	
2022	Un Ojo	Ramon Vazquez	Ricky Courville	Cypress Creek Equine	1 1/16 miles	1:45.69	$1,000,000	II	
2021	Concert Tour	Joel Rosario	Bob Baffert	Gary & Mary West	1 1/16 miles	1:43.18	$1,000,000	II	
2020	Nadal	Joel Rosario	Bob Baffert	George Bolton, Arthur Hoyeau, Barry Lipman & Mark Mathiesen	1 1/16 miles	1:44.97	$1,000,000	II	
2019	Long Range Toddy	Jon Court	Steven M. Asmussen	Willis Horton Racing	1 1/16 miles	1:42.49	$750,000	II	Division 1
2019	Omaha Beach	Mike E. Smith	Richard E. Mandella	Fox Hill Farms (Rick Porter)	1 1/16 miles	1:42.42	$750,000	II	Division 2
2018	Magnum Moon	Luis Saez	Todd A. Pletcher	Lawana L. & Robert E. Low	1 1/16 miles	1:42.68	$900,000	II	
2017	Malagacy	Javier Castellano	Todd A. Pletcher	Sumaya U.S. Stable (Oussama Aboughazale)	1 1/16 miles	1:43.00	$900,000	II	
2016	Cupid	Martin Garcia	Bob Baffert	Derrick Smith, Susan Magnier, Michael Tabor	1 1/16 miles	1:43.84	$900,000	II	
2015	American Pharoah	Victor Espinoza	Bob Baffert	Zayat Stables	1 1/16 miles	1:45.78	$750,000	II	
2014	Hoppertunity	Mike E. Smith	Bob Baffert	Karl Watson, Michael Pegram, Paul Weitman	1 1/16 miles	1:43.90	$600,000	II	
2013	Will Take Charge	Jon Court	D. Wayne Lukas	Willis D. Horton	1 1/16 miles	1:45.18	$600,000	II	
2012	Secret Circle	Rafael Bejarano	Bob Baffert	Karl Watson, Michael Pegram, Paul Weitman	1 1/16 miles	1:44.55	$500,000	II	
2011	The Factor	Martin Garcia	Bob Baffert	Fog City Stable & George Bolton	1 1/16 miles	1:42.19	$300,000	II	
2010	Lookin at Lucky	Garrett K. Gomez	Bob Baffert	Karl Watson, Michael Pegram, Paul Weitman	1 1/16 miles	1:43.06	$300,000	II	
2009	Win Willy	M. Clifton Berry	McLean Robertson	Jer-Mar Stable	1 1/16 miles	1:44.41	$300,000	II	
2008	Sierra Sunset	Christopher A. Emigh	Jeffrey L. Bonde	Philip Lebherz, Al Mariani, George Schmitt & Carol Wirth Trust	1 1/16 miles	1:43.88	$300,000	II	
2007	Curlin	Robby Albarado	Steven M. Asmussen	Padua Stables, Stonestreet Stables, George Bolton & Midnight Cry Stable	1 1/16 miles	1:44.70	$300,000	III	
2006	Lawyer Ron	John McKee	Robert E. Holthus	Estate of James T. Hines Jr.	1 1/16 miles	1:44.09	$300,000	III	
2005	Greater Good	John McKee	Robert E. Holthus	Lewis G. Lakin	1 1/16 miles	1:44.92	$250,000	III	
2004	Smarty Jones	Stewart Elliott	John C. Servis	Someday Farm	1 1/16 miles	1:42.07	$200,000	Listed	
2003	Crowned King	Chandra R. Rennie	Billy C. McKeever Jr.	McKeever Racing Stable	1 1/16 miles	1:44.00	$125,000	Listed	
2002	Windward Passage	Donnie Meche	Steven M. Asmussen	Team Valor	1 1/16 miles	1:45.06	$100,000	III	
2001	Crafty Shaw	Joe M. Johnson	Peter M. Vestal	Lucky Seven Stable	1 1/16 miles	1:43.82	$100,000	III	
2000	Snuck In	Cash Asmussen	Steven M. Asmussen	Ackerley Brothers Farm	1 1/16 miles	1:42.99	$100,000	III	
1999	Etbauer	Mike E. Smith	Steve Wren	Kaaren J. & Hays M. Biggs	1 1/16 miles	1:44.02	$125,000	III	
1998	Victory Gallop	Eibar Coa	W. Elliott Walden	Prestonwood Farm	1 1/16 miles	1:44.72	$125,000	III	
1997	Phantom On Tour	Larry Melancon	Lynn S. Whiting	W. Cal Partee	1 1/16 miles	1:42.93	$125,000	III	
1996	Ide	Craig Perret	Peter M. Vestal	Willmott Stables	1 1/16 miles	1:44.10	$100,000	III	
1995	Mystery Storm	Craig Perret	Larry Robideaux Jr.	David Beard	1 1/16 miles	1:44.41	$125,000	III	
1994	Judge T C	Joe M. Johnson	Gary G. Hartlage	Bea & Robert H. Roberts	1 1/16 miles	1:44.14	$125,000	III	
1993	§ Dalhart	Mike E. Smith	Thomas K. Bohannan	Loblolly Stable	1 1/16 miles	1:42.31	$125,000	III	
1992	Pine Bluff	Jerry D. Bailey	Thomas K. Bohannan	Loblolly Stable	1 1/16 miles	1:42.83	$125,000	III	
1991	Quintana	David Guillory	David C. Cross Jr.	Gary M. Garber	1 1/16 miles	1:42.70	$100,000	III	
1990	Nuits St. Georges	James Edward Bruin	Douglas R. Peterson	Photini Jaffe	1 1/16 miles	1:46.00	$100,000	III	
1989	Manastash Ridge	Antonio Lopez Castanon	D. Wayne Lukas	Tayhill Stables	1 1/16 miles	1:43.00	$100,000		
1988	Sea Trek	Patrick A. Johnson	Gary G. Hartlage	Diana Stables	1 1/16 miles	1:42.60	$122,500		
1987	Demons Begone	Pat Day	Philip M. Hauswald	Loblolly Stable	1 1/16 miles	1:41.40	$147,700		
1986	Rare Brick	Mike E. Smith	A. J. Foyt III	Pin Oak Stable & A. J. Foyt	1 1/16 miles	1:43.20	$132,600		
1985	Clever Allemont	Pat Day	Lynn S. Whiting	W. Cal Partee	1 1/16 miles	1:44.40	$163,500		
1984	Vanlandingham	Pat Day	Claude R. McGaughey III	Loblolly Stable	1 1/16 miles	1:41.00	$167,900		
Rebel Handicap
1983	Sunny's Halo (CAN)	Larry Snyder	David C. Cross Jr.	David J. Foster	1 mile & 70 yards	1:42.20	$114,750		
1982	Bold Style	Larry Snyder	Jack Van Berg	Len Mayer	1 mile & 70 yards	1:44.40	$85,700		
1981	Bold Ego	John Lively	Dennis Werre	Double B Ranch & Joseph Kidd	1 mile & 70 yards	1:41.20	$59,300		
1980	Temperence Hill	Darrell Haire	Joseph B. Cantey	Loblolly Stable	1 mile & 70 yards	1:44.40	$64,050		
1979	Lucy's Axe	Eddie Maple	Joseph B. Cantey	Mrs. Lucy H. Close	1 mile & 70 yards	1:42.80	$59,850		
1978	Chop Chop Tomahawk	Larry Snyder	Earl R. Jackson	Daybreak Farm	1 mile & 70 yards	1:42.40	$60,250		
1977	§ United Holme	Jorge Enrique Tejeira	Robert E. Holthus	Wanda Lofton & Dixie Holthus	1 mile & 70 yards	1:44.20	$61,350		
1976	ƒ Riverside Sam	Garth Patterson	Earl R. Jackson	Daybreak Farm	1 mile & 70 yards	1:41.60	$62,250		
1975	Promised City	David E. Whited	Larry Spraker	Big I Farm	1 mile & 70 yards	1:44.40	$50,000		
1974	§ Perfect Aim	Geary E. Louviere	Harold Tinker	W. Cal Partee	1 mile & 70 yards	1:44.40	$50,000		
1973	Game Lad	Al Herrera	David R. Vance	Dan Lasater	1 mile & 70 yards	1:41.20	$30,000		
1972	Our Trade Winds	Lonnie Ray	Robert E. Holthus	Robert Mitchell	1 mile & 70 yards	1:42.60	$25,000		
1971	Compte Deux	Don Brumfield	Ike K. Mourar	Robert E. Lehmann	1 mile & 70 yards	1:44.40	$25,000		
1970	Admiral's Shield	Stanley A. Spencer	Harvey L. Vanier	W. C. Robinson Jr.	1 mile & 70 yards	1:44.00	$20,000		
1969	Traffic Mark	Phil I. Grimm	Ronnie G. Warren	Mr. & Mrs. Robert F. Roberts	1 mile & 70 yards	1:42.80	$15,000		
1968	Etony	John Pagano	Harry Holcomb	G. B. Newbill	1 mile & 70 yards	1:43.80	$12,500		
1967	Betemight (CAN)	Henry Moreno	Douglas M. Davis Jr.	George M. Holtsinger & Doug Davis Stables	1 mile & 70 yards	1:40.80	$10,000		
1966	Timely Move	Marty Freed	Charlie Vinci	Cantor & Hill	1 mile & 70 yards	1:42.20	$10,000		
1965	Swift Ruler	Larry Spraker	Gin L. Collins	Earl Allen	1 mile & 70 yards	1:44.20	$10,000		
1964	† Spike Nail	Ronnie J. Campbell	Robert E. Holthus	C. O. Viar	1 mile & 70 yards	1:43.00	$10,000		
1963	Devil It Is	Robert Gallimore	Gino T. Alberico	Bar-Al-Mar Stable	1 mile & 70 yards	1:45.00	$10,000		
1962	Treasury Note	Wayne Chambers	Henry Forrest	J. C. Pollard	1 mile & 70 yards	1:42.40	$10,000		
1961	Bass Clef	Ronald Baldwin	Anthony W. Rupelt	Mrs. Vera E. Smith	1 mile & 70 yards	1:42.40	$10,000		

Notes:
§ Ran as an entry
ƒ Ran as the field entry
† Floral Shop was first past the post but was disqualified for interference and placed second. Spike Nail was declared the winner.

== See also ==
- Road to the Kentucky Derby
- List of American and Canadian Graded races
