= Little Missouri (horse) =

American-bred Thoroughbred racehorse

- Sire: Cox's Ridge
- Grandsire: Best Turn
- Dam: Win Nona
- Damsire: Jacinto
- Sex: Stallion
- Foaled: 1982
- Country: United States
- Colour: Chestnut
- Breeder: Mrs. Maxwell Wood
- Owner: Loblolly Stable
- Trainer: Rusty Arnold
- Record: 25: 8-6-3
- Earnings: $553,025

Major wins
- Brooklyn Handicap (1986); Stuyvesant Handicap (1986)
- Last updated on August 25, 2007

Little Missouri (April 23, 1982 – September 8, 2006) was an American Thoroughbred racehorse.

Bred in Kentucky by Mrs. Maxwell Wood, Little Missouri was owned and raced by John Ed Anthony's Loblolly Stable of Lake Hamilton, Arkansas. Under trainer Rusty Arnold, he had his best season as a four-year-old in 1986 when he won the Grade I Brooklyn Handicap and the then GII Stuyvesant Handicap, the latter a race his sire Cox's Ridge had won in 1977.

== As a Sire ==
Retired from racing, Little Missouri sired six stakes winners including the 1993 U.S. Champion three-year-old colt and Preakness Stakes winner, Prairie Bayou. At the end of the 2005 breeding season he was pensioned and on September 8, 2006, was euthanized due to the infirmities of old age at Foxhills Farm in Lexington, Kentucky where he was buried.
