= Razorback Handicap =

- Class: Grade III
- Location: Oaklawn Park Race Track; Hot Springs, Arkansas
- Inaugurated: 1960
- Race type: Thoroughbred - Flat racing
- Website: Oaklawn Park

Race information
- Distance: 1 1/16 miles
- Surface: Dirt
- Track: Left-handed
- Qualification: Four years old and older
- Weight: Assigned
- Purse: $500,000 (since 2025)

The Razorback Handicap is a Grade III American Thoroughbred horse race for four-year-olds and older at a distance of one and one-sixteenth miles on the dirt run annually in February at Oaklawn Park Race Track in Hot Springs, Arkansas. The event currently offers a purse of $500,000.

== History ==
The event was inaugurated on 20 February 1960 as a $3,200 allowance race over the sprinting distance of 5 1/2 furlongs and was won by Cyrob in a time of 1:05.80. The next season the race was scheduled later in March with an increased purse and distance of one mile and seventy yards thus becoming a natural preparatory race for the track's signature event for older horses - the Oaklawn Handicap which is held in April. The first horse to perform the double feat was Swift Ruler in 1966. That year Swift Ruler set a new track and stakes record for the Razorback winning in a time of 1:39 1/5.

In 1968 the event was run in split divisions. The winner of the second division, Barb's Delight had finished second in the 1967 Kentucky Derby The following year the distance of the event was increased to 1 1/16 miles.

In 1978 the event was upgraded to Grade III.

Other notable winners of the event include Cox's Ridge in 1978 and 1981 winner Temperence Hill who resumed after being crowned the 1980 United States Champion Three-Year-Old Colt. The 1989 winner, Allen E. Paulson's Blushing John went onto be crowned United States Champion Older Male Horse. The 2017 United States Champion Older Male Horse Gun Runner began his championship campaign with an emphatic 5 3/4 length victory as the 1/5on favorite.

Between 2005 and 2008, the Breeders' Cup sponsored the event which reflected in the name of the event.

== Records ==
Speed record:

- 1 1/16 miles – 1:40.40 Lost Code (1988)
- 1 mile and 70 yards – 1:39.20 Swift Ruler (1966)

Largest Winning Margin:

- 6 3/4 lengths – Golden Lad (2014)

Most wins by a jockey:

- 6 – Pat Day (1982, 1983, 1985, 1989, 1990, 1993)

Most wins by a trainer:

- 5 – Joseph B. Cantey (1978, 1981, 1982, 1983, 1984)

Most wins by an owner:

- 2 – Earl Allen (1966, 1967)
- 2 – Loblolly Stable (1978, 1981)
- 2 – Happy Valley Farm (1982, 1983)
- 2 – Allen E. Paulson (1982, 1983)
- 2 – Don C. McNeill (2001, 2002)
- 2 - Winchell Thoroughbreds LLC (2017, 2026)

Razorback Handicap – Oaklawn Handicap double:

- Swift Ruler (1966), Charlie Jr. (1970), Gage Line (1972), Cox's Ridge (1978), Temperence Hill (1981), Eminency (1982), Lost Code (1988), Opening Verse (1990), Alternation (2012), Cyber Secret (2013), Raceday (2015)

== Winners ==
Year	Winner	Age	Jockey	Trainer	Owner	Distance	Time	Purse	Grade	Ref
2026	Magnitude	4	Jose L. Ortiz	Steven M. Asmussen	Winchell Thoroughbreds	1 1/16 miles	1:42.10	$500,000	III	
2025	Alexander Helios	5	Tyler Gaffalione	Saffie Joseph Jr.	John & Diane Fradkin	1 1/16 miles	1:41.88	$500,000	III	
2024	Octane	5	Julien Leparoux	Juan Alvarado	Arindel	1 1/16 miles	1:43.57	$600,000	III	
2023	Last Samurai	5	Cristian Torres	D. Wayne Lukas	Stonestreet Thoroughbred Holdings	1 1/16 miles	1:42.19	$600,000	III	
2022	Plainsman	7	Joel Rosario	Brad H. Cox	Shortleaf Stable	1 1/16 miles	1:43.79	$600,000	III	
2021	Mystic Guide	4	Luis Saez	Michael Stidham	Godolphin Racing	1 1/16 miles	1:44.33	$600,000	III	
2020	Warrior's Charge	4	Florent Geroux	Brad H. Cox	Ten Strike Racing & Madaket Stables	1 1/16 miles	1:43.00	$500,000	III	
2019	Coal Front	5	John R. Velazquez	Todd A. Pletcher	Robert V. LaPenta & Head of Plains Partners	1 1/16 miles	1:43.45	$500,000	III	
2018	Hawaakom	8	Corey J. Lanerie	Wesley E. Hawley	Stephan H. Smoot & Wesley E. Hawley	1 1/16 miles	1:45.14	$500,000	III	
2017	Gun Runner	4	Florent Geroux	Steven M. Asmussen	Winchell Thoroughbreds & Three Chimneys Farm	1 1/16 miles	1:40.97	$500,000	III	
2016	Upstart	4	Joe Bravo	Richard A. Violette Jr.	Ralph M. Evans & WinStar Farm	1 1/16 miles	1:44.12	$350,000	III	
2015	Race Day	4	John R. Velazquez	Todd A. Pletcher	Matthew Schera	1 1/16 miles	1:44.88	$250,000	III	
2014	Golden Lad	4	Jose Lezcano	Todd A. Pletcher	E. Paul Robsham Stables	1 1/16 miles	1:43.72	$200,000	III	
2013	Cyber Secret	4	Robby Albarado	Lynn S. Whiting	Charles J. Cella	1 1/16 miles	1:44.80	$150,000	III	
2012	Alternation	4	Luis S. Quinonez	Donnie K. Von Hemel	Pin Oak Stable	1 1/16 miles	1:43.50	$125,000	III	
2011	It Happened Again	5	Michael Baze	Steven M. Asmussen	Maggi Moss	1 1/16 miles	1:43.58	$125,000	III	
2010	† Spotsgone	7	Jon Court	William H. Fires	Robert Yagos	1 1/16 miles	1:43.83	$150,000	III	
2009	Let It Rock	4	Terry J. Thompson	Judi A. Hicklin	Hicklin Farms & Tom Gregerson	1 1/16 miles	1:44.18	$120,000	III	
2008	Jonesboro	6	Calvin H. Borel	Randy L. Morse	Michael Langford	1 1/16 miles	1:44.21	$149,000	III	
2007	Magna Graduate	5	John R. Velazquez	Todd A. Pletcher	Elisabeth H. Alexander	1 1/16 miles	1:44.17	$150,000	III	
2006	Purim	4	Robby Albarado	Thomas F. Proctor	Edward Joseph Sukley	1 1/16 miles	1:43.77	$150,000	III	
2005	Added Edge	5	Luis S. Quinonez	Dale L. Romans	Team Valor Stables & Robert J. Wilson	1 1/16 miles	1:43.88	$125,000	III	
2004	Sonic West	5	Willie Martinez	Thomas L. Van Berg	Stone Spire	1 1/16 miles	1:43.56	$100,000	III	
2003	Colorful Tour	4	Luis S. Quinonez	P. Noel Hickey	Irish Acres Farm (P. Noel Hickey)	1 1/16 miles	1:43.53	$100,000	III	
2002	Mr Ross	7	Donald R. Pettinger	Donnie K. Von Hemel	Don C. McNeill	1 1/16 miles	1:44.13	$100,000	III	
2001	Mr Ross	6	Donald R. Pettinger	Donnie K. Von Hemel	Don C. McNeill	1 1/16 miles	1:42.60	$125,000	III	
2000	Well Noted	5	Timothy T. Doocy	Randy L. Morse	Robert S. Mitchell Trust	1 1/16 miles	1:43.21	$125,000	III	
1999	Desert Air	4	Corey J. Lanerie	Michael Stidham	Mount Brilliant Stable	1 1/16 miles	1:44.75	$125,000	III	
1998	Brush With Pride	6	Timothy T. Doocy	Steve Hobby	Barbara R. & John E. Smicklas	1 1/16 miles	1:43.55	$125,000	III	
1997	No Spend No Glow	5	Robert Neal Lester	Donnie K. Von Hemel	E. J. Dullea Partnership	1 1/16 miles	1:43.38	$150,000	III	
1996	Juliannus	7	Robby Albarado	Albert Stall Jr.	Francis Foret, Joe Gee, David Hulkewicz & Robert Wilensky	1 1/16 miles	1:43.37	$150,000	II	
1995	Silver Goblin	4	Dale W. Cordova	Kenny P. Smith	Al J. Horton	1 1/16 miles	1:42.79	$200,000	II	
1994	Prize Fight	5	Patrick A. Johnson	James O. Keefer	L. William Heiligbrodt, Ted Keefer & Walter New	1 1/16 miles	1:43.70	$150,000	II	
1993	Lil E. Tee	4	Pat Day	Lynn S. Whiting	W. Cal Partee	1 1/16 miles	1:41.55	$150,000	II	
1992	Tokatee	6	Garrett K. Gomez	Ron McAnally	Marie D Jones	1 1/16 miles	1:42.87	$150,000	II	
1991	Bedeviled	4	Donald Lee Howard	Jack Van Berg	John A. Franks	1 1/16 miles	1:42.50	$150,000	II	
1990	Opening Verse	4	Pat Day	Richard J. Lundy	Allen E. Paulson	1 1/16 miles	1:41.40	$150,000	II	
1989	Blushing John	4	Pat Day	Richard J. Lundy	Allen E. Paulson	1 1/16 miles	1:43.00	$100,000	II	
1988	Lost Code	4	Craig Perret	William L. Donovan	Wendover Stable	1 1/16 miles	1:40.40	$122,500	II	
1987	Bolshoi Boy	4	Randy Romero	Howard M. Tesher	Art Belford & John Greathouse Jr.	1 1/16 miles	1:40.80	$147,700	II	
1986	Red Attack	4	Larry Snyder	A. J. Foyt III	Calumet Farm	1 1/16 miles	1:42.00	$143,500	II	
1985	Imp Society	4	Pat Day	D. Wayne Lukas	Heslop Stable	1 1/16 miles	1:42.60	$167,900	II	
1984	Dew Line	5	Sam Maple	Joseph B. Cantey	Jerold Hoffberger	1 1/16 miles	1:41.60	$124,200	III	
1983	Eminency	5	Pat Day	Joseph B. Cantey	Happy Valley Farm	1 1/16 miles	1:43.60	$117,900	III	
1982	Eminency	4	Pat Day	Joseph B. Cantey	Happy Valley Farm	1 1/16 miles	1:45.20	$127,000	III	
1981	Temperence Hill	4	Eddie Maple	Joseph B. Cantey	Loblolly Stable	1 1/16 miles	1:44.20	$111,100	III	
1980	All the More	7	Larry Snyder	Del W. Carroll	Frank J. Cullerton	1 1/16 miles	1:45.40	$94,000	III	
1979	Cisk	5	Garth Patterson	Glenn L. Hild	Carolyn Manning	1 1/16 miles	1:45.40	$89,500	III	
1978	Cox's Ridge	4	Eddie Maple	Joseph B. Cantey	Loblolly Stable	1 1/16 miles	1:43.00	$61,850	III	
1977	Dragset	6	Jon Kunitake	Glenn L. Hild	Jim Manning	1 1/16 miles	1:44.40	$59,850		
1976	Royal Glint	6	Jorge Enrique Tejeira	Gordon R. Potter	Dan Lasater	1 1/16 miles	1:42.40	$60,750		
1975	Navajo	5	James D. Nichols	James O. Keefer	Joseph Stevenson & Raymond Stump	1 1/16 miles	1:43.20	$50,000		
1974	Model Husband	5	John Lively	Jim E. O'Bryant	Mrs. Hugh L. Hembree	1 1/16 miles	1:43.80	$50,000		
1973	The Cutter	4	Alberto Ramos	Robert L. Irwin	Redbob Farms	1 1/16 miles	1:44:00	$30,000		
1972	Gage Line	6	Louis Spindler	David R. Vance	Robert Ballis	1 1/16 miles	1:43.80	$25,000		
1971	Francesco	5	Jon Kunitake	A. J. Moidell	A. J. Moidell	1 1/16 miles	1:42.60	$30,000		
1970	§ Charlie Jr.	4	Larry Snyder	Dewey P. Smith	T. Allie & James E. Grissom	1 1/16 miles	1:43.80	$25,000		
1969	Hy Frost	4	Billy J. Phelps	Forrest Kaelin	Fleming B. Fraser	1 1/16 miles	1:44.60	$15,000		
1968	Missouri Gent	4	Hector Viera	Edmond Waller	Edmond & John Waller	1 mile & 70 yards	1:42.40	$12,500		Division 1
1968	Barb's Delight	4	Earl Knapp	Henry W. Steele Jr.	Guy Huguelot, Gene Spading & Henry W. Steele Jr.	1 mile & 70 yards	1:41.00	$12,500		Division 2
1967	Swift Ruler	5	Wayne Chambers	Gin L. Collins	Earl Allen	1 mile & 70 yards	1:41.20	$10,000		
1966	Swift Ruler	4	Larry R. Spraker	Gin L. Collins	Earl Allen	1 mile & 70 yards	1:39.20	$10,000		
1965	El Bora	5	Rudy Campas	C. Vinvi	Ace Hi Stable	1 mile & 70 yards	1:40.80	$10,000		
1964	Jaywalking	7	Frank Pacheco	Bryan Wise	Perne L. Grissom	1 mile & 70 yards	1:41.00	$10,000		
1963	Loyal Son	7	William Carstens	Roy Gillem	Eastwood Stable	1 mile & 70 yards	1:41.00	$10,000		
1962	Natego	5	Eugene Curry	J. J. Lombardo	Marilynn V. Landy	1 mile & 70 yards	1:39.60	$10,000		
1961	§ Eight Again	4	Willie Cook	Vester R. Wright	T. Allie Grissom	1 mile & 70 yards	1:39.60	$10,000		
1960	Cyrob	4	James D. Nichols	J. McFarlan	J. Davidson	5 1/2 furlongs	1:05.80	$3,200		

Notes:
§ Ran as an entry
† In the 2010 running of the event Win Willy was first past the post and wagering was paid out as the winner, however the horse returned a positive swab for the presence of two non-steroidal anti-inflammatory drugs and consequently was disqualified from the prizemoney and was placed eighth (last). As a result, the first-place purse was awarded to Spotsgone and all other finishers were advanced one position for the purposes of purses.

== See also ==
- List of American and Canadian Graded races
