= Sam Maple =

American jockey

Personal information
- Born: July 18, 1953 Carrollton, Ohio, United States
- Died: November 13, 2001 (aged 48)
- Occupation: Jockey

Horse racing career
- Sport: Horse racing
- Career wins: 2,500+

Major racing wins
- Arlington-Washington Lassie Stakes (1976); Cornhusker Handicap (1976); Secretariat Stakes (1976); Omaha Gold Cup (1976, 1977); Travers Stakes (1977); Phoenix Stakes (1978); Adirondack Stakes (1979); American Derby (1979); Frizette Stakes (1979); Matron Stakes (1979); Illinois Derby (1979); Ohio Derby (1979); Pennsylvania Derby (1979); Pilgrim Stakes (1979); Selima Stakes (1979); Spinaway Stakes (1979); Count Fleet Sprint Handicap (1980); Miramar Stakes (1983); River City Stakes (1983); Apple Blossom Handicap (1984); Bewitch Stakes (1984); Louisiana Derby (1984); Hempstead Handicap (1984); Razorback Handicap (1984); Shuvee Handicap (1984); Washington Park Handicap (1984); Monterey Handicap (1987); H.B.P.A. Invitational Handicap (1988); Old South Handicap (1991); Alcibiades Stakes (1994); Kentucky Jockey Club Stakes (1994)

Racing awards
- Leading jockey at Meadowlands Racetrack (1978); Co-Leading jockey at Oaklawn Park (1978)

Significant horses
- Cox's Ridge, Heatherten, Smart Angle; Smarten, Temperence Hill

Samuel A. Maple (July 18, 1953 - November 13, 2001) was an American jockey in Thoroughbred horse racing.

Born in Carrollton, Ohio, Sam Maple was one of eight brothers and sisters. His older brother, Eddie, was also a jockey. He began his professional riding career in 1969 in his native Ohio at Thistledown Racecourse in North Randall where he got the first of his more than 2,500 career race wins. He would go on to compete at various tracks across the United States, earning wins in major races such as the Travers Stakes. In 1979, he rode Smarten to wins in four Derbys, capturing the American, Illinois, Ohio, and Pennsylvania Derbys.

In 1979, Maple was the regular jockey on Smart Angle, who earned American Champion Two-Year-Old Filly honors. On April 18, 1984, Maple set the Oaklawn Park track record for a mile and a sixteenth in winning the Apple Blossom Handicap aboard Heatherten.

In 1988, Maple was diagnosed as having a brain tumor. He underwent surgery and returned to racing in April of the following year. In late August 1990, he was involved in a racing accident at Louisiana Downs that broke both of his legs and kept him out of racing for several months. On September 11, 1993, Maple earned his 2,500th career win in the second race at Turfway Park aboard Corvus.

Maple earned his last win at Churchill Downs in November 1995. After only a few rides in 1996, he retired from the sport. He was married to his wife Jill and had four children. He and his family had made their home in Louisville, Kentucky in the early 1990s but in the fall of 2001 they moved to Wilmore, Kentucky, where he succumbed to his cancer at age 48 on November 13.
