= Honeybee Stakes =

- Class: Grade III
- Location: Oaklawn Park Race Track; Hot Springs, Arkansas, U.S.
- Inaugurated: 1988
- Race type: Thoroughbred - Flat racing
- Website: www.oaklawn.com

Race information
- Distance: 1 1/16 miles
- Surface: Dirt
- Track: left-handed
- Qualification: Three-year-old fillies
- Weight: 122 lbs. with allowances
- Purse: $750,000 (2026)

The Honeybee Stakes is a Grade III American Thoroughbred horse race for three-year-old fillies at a distance of one and one-sixteenth miles on the dirt run annually in late February or early March at Oaklawn Park Race Track in Hot Springs, Arkansas. The event currently offers a purse of $750,000.

== History ==
The inaugural running of the event was on 1 April 1988 and was won by the US Hall of Fame trained D. Wayne Lukas and ridden by US Hall of Fame jockey José A. Santos, Lost Kitty who defeated the 1987 US Champion Two-Year-Old Filly Epitome by 4 1/2 lengths in a time of 1:43 4/5. D. Wayne Lukas continued his streak in this event training the first four winners.

The event was upgraded to Grade III status in 1990. In 2003, it was downgraded to listed status and held this status until 2008 when it was reclassified as Grade III

The 2008 winner Eight Belles won the event as a short 3/5 odds-on favorite. Later that spring Eight Belles would be tragically euthanized after finishing second in the 2008 Kentucky Derby.

The 2020 winner Shedaresthedevil continued her good form to win the Kentucky Oaks.

The event is part of Road to the Kentucky Oaks.

== Records ==
Speed record:

- 1:42.61 - It Tiz Well (2017)

Margins:

- 10 lengths – Imaginary Lady (1989)

Most wins by a jockey:

- 3 - Donald Pettinger (2002, 2003, 2004)

Most wins by a trainer:

- 7 - D. Wayne Lukas (1988, 1989, 1990, 1991, 2007, 2022, 2024)

Most wins by an owner:

- 3 - Fox Hill Farms, Inc. (2005, 2008, 2011)

== Winners ==
Year	Winner	Jockey	Trainer	Owner	Distance	Time	Purse	Grade	Ref
2026	Explora	Flavien Prat	Bob Baffert	Karl Watson, Michael E. Pegram & Paul Weitman	1 1/16 miles	1:43.52	$750,000	III	
2025	Quietside	José Ortiz	John Ortiz	Shortleaf Stable	1 1/16 miles	1:43.63	$500,000	III	
2024	Lemon Muffin	Keith Asmussen	D. Wayne Lukas	Aaron Sones	1 1/16 miles	1:45.60	$400,000	III	
2023	Wet Paint	Flavien Prat	Brad H. Cox	Godolphin	1 1/16 miles	1:45.35	$300,000	III	
2022	Secret Oath	Luis Contreras	D. Wayne Lukas	Briland Farm	1 1/16 miles	1:44.74	$300,000	III	
2021	Will's Secret	Jon Court	Dallas Stewart	Willis Horton Racing	1 1/16 miles	1:44.61	$300,000	III	
2020	Shedaresthedevil	Joseph Talamo	Brad H. Cox	Flurry Racing Stables, Qatar Racing Limited & Big Aut Farms	1 1/16 miles	1:44.38	$300,000	III	
2019	Chocolate Kisses	Orlando Mojica	Mark E. Casse	Debby M. Oxley	1 1/16 miles	1:45.78	$200,000	III	
2018	Cosmic Burst	Richard E. Eramia	Donnie K. Von Hemel	Norma Lee Stockseth & Todd Dunn	1 1/16 miles	1:44.19	$200,000	III	
2017	It Tiz Well	Corey Nakatani	Jerry Hollendorfer	Tommy Towns Thoroughbreds	1 1/16 miles	1:42.61	$200,000	III	
2016	Terra Promessa	Ricardo Santana Jr.	Steven M. Asmussen	Stonestreet Stables	1 1/16 miles	1:47.14	$200,000	III	
2015	Sarah Sis	Julio E. Felix	Ingrid Mason	Joe Ragsdale	1 1/16 miles	1:46.94	$150,000	III	
2014	† Euphrosyne	Ricardo Santana Jr.	Steven M. Asmussen	Gillian S. Campbell, Ralph & Shelly Stayer, Dan Clark & Greg Skoda	1 1/16 miles	1:45.68	$150,000	III	
2013	Rose to Gold	Calvin H. Borel	Sal Santoro	Kathleen Amaya & Raffaele Centofanti	1 1/16 miles	1:45.06	$150,000	III	
2012	On Fire Baby	Joe M. Johnson	Gary G. Hartlage	Anita Cauley	1 1/16 miles	1:43.64	$125,000	III	
2011	Joyful Victory	Mike E. Smith	J. Larry Jones	Fox Hill Farms	1 1/16 miles	1:44.83	$125,000	III	
2010	No Such Word	Terry J. Thompson	Cindy Jones	Brereton C. Jones	1 1/16 miles	1:43.74	$125,000	III	
2009	Just Jenda	Gabriel Saez	J. Larry Jones	Cindy Jones	1 1/16 miles	1:45.95	$100,000	III	
2008	Eight Belles	Ramon A. Dominguez	J. Larry Jones	Fox Hill Farms	1 1/16 miles	1:43.91	$100,000	III	
2007	Time's Mistress	John Jacinto	D. Wayne Lukas	Charles L. Kidder	1 1/16 miles	1:45.49	$100,000	Listed	
2006	Ermine	Calvin H. Borel	Ronny W. Werner	Oxbow Racing	1 1/16 miles	1:44.48	$75,000	Listed	
2005	Round Pond	Stewart Elliott	John C. Servis	Fox Hill Farms	1 1/16 miles	1:45.16	$75,000	Listed	
2004	Yoursmineours	Donald R. Pettinger	Donnie K. Von Hemel	Stan Burnstein & Jim E. Nelson	1 1/16 miles	1:45.14	$75,000	Listed	
2003	My Trusty Cat	Donald R. Pettinger	David R. Vance	Carl F. Pollard	1 1/16 miles	1:44.00	$75,000	Listed	
2002	Bedanken	Donald R. Pettinger	Donnie K. Von Hemel	Pin Oak Stable	1 1/16 miles	1:46.41	$75,000	III	
2001	Xtreme Bid	David C. Nuesch	W. Bret Thomas	Glen Hendon	1 1/16 miles	1:46.07	$75,000	III	
2000	Fiesty Countess	Timothy T. Doocy	Steven M. Asmussen	Heiligbrodt Racing Stable	1 1/16 miles	1:44.60	$75,000	III	
1999	Dreams Gallore	Glen Murphy	Steven M. Asmussen	Keith I. Asmussen	1 1/16 miles	1:43.49	$75,000	III	
1998	Roza Robata	Fabio A. Arguello Jr.	Henry B. Johnson Jr.	Fletcher B. Clement & S. H. Mayes Jr.	1 1/16 miles	1:45.95	$75,000	III	
1997	Valid Bonnet	Timothy T. Doocy	Steven M. Asmussen	Ackerly Brothers Farm	1 1/16 miles	1:43.60	$75,000	III	
1996	Jetto	Larry Melancon	David R. Vance	Carl F. Pollard	1 1/16 miles	1:46.20	$75,000	III	
1995	Humble Eight	David Guillory	James E. Danaher	Danaher Stables	1 1/16 miles	1:45.20	$75,000	III	
1994	Shadow Miss	Willie Martinez	Peter M. Vestal	John R. & Martha J. Mulholland	1 1/16 miles	1:44.60	$75,000	III	
1993	Aztec Hill	Aaron Gryder	Thomas K. Bohannan	Loblolly Stable	1 1/16 miles	1:44.40	$75,000	III	
1992	Totemic	David Roy Miller	Thomas K. Bohannan	Loblolly Stable	1 1/16 miles	1:43.20	$75,000	III	
1991	Be Cool	David Guillory	D. Wayne Lukas	Sugar Maple Farms & D. Wayne Lukas	1 1/16 miles	1:44.80	$75,000	III	
1990	Train Robbery	Pat Day	D. Wayne Lukas	Overbrook Farm	1 1/16 miles	1:45.60	$75,000	III	
1989	Imaginary Lady	Jerry D. Bailey	D. Wayne Lukas	Lloyd French & D. Wayne Lukas	1 1/16 miles	1:43.00	$75,000		
1988	Lost Kitty	Jose A. Santos	D. Wayne Lukas	Eugene V. Klein	1 1/16 miles	1:43.80	$75,000		

Notes:
† Sugar Shock, was first past the post but was disqualified from her neck victory for lugging out and impeding runner-up Euphrosyne a furlong from the wire and placed second.

== See also ==
- List of American and Canadian Graded races
