= Stuyvesant Handicap =

- Class: Grade III
- Location: Aqueduct Racetrack; Queens, New York
- Inaugurated: 1916
- Final run: 2008
- Race type: Thoroughbred, Flat racing

Race information
- Distance: 1 1/8 miles (9 furlongs)
- Track: Dirt, left-handed
- Qualification: Three-years-old & up
- Purse: $100,000+

The Stuyvesant Handicap was an American Thoroughbred horse race held annually in the fall of the year at Aqueduct Racetrack in Queens, New York. Inaugurated in 1916, after its 58th running in 2008, the race was discontinued.

A Grade III event for horses aged three and older, it was contested on dirt over nine furlongs—1 1/8 miles (1.8 km). The Stuyvesant, named for an area of New York settled by the Dutch in the dawn of what would become America, offered a purse of $100,000 added.

== History ==
The Stuyvesant was run at Jamaica Race Course for three-year-olds from 1916 to 1924, and from 1937 to 1939. In 1916, 1917, and 1918, and again from 1937 to 1939, it was a six furlong (3/4 mile) sprint. It went off at a mile (eight furlongs) from 1919 to 1924. It was not run from 1925 to 1936, nor from 1940 to 1962.

In 1963, the race was resumed, at Aqueduct Racetrack over a distance of nine furlongs (1 1/8 miles). The distance was reduced to a mile (eight furlongs) from 1964 to 1972, then restored to nine furlongs from 1973 until discontinued. The race remained at Aqueduct until discontinued, except for three runnings at Belmont Park (1990, 1995, and 2001).

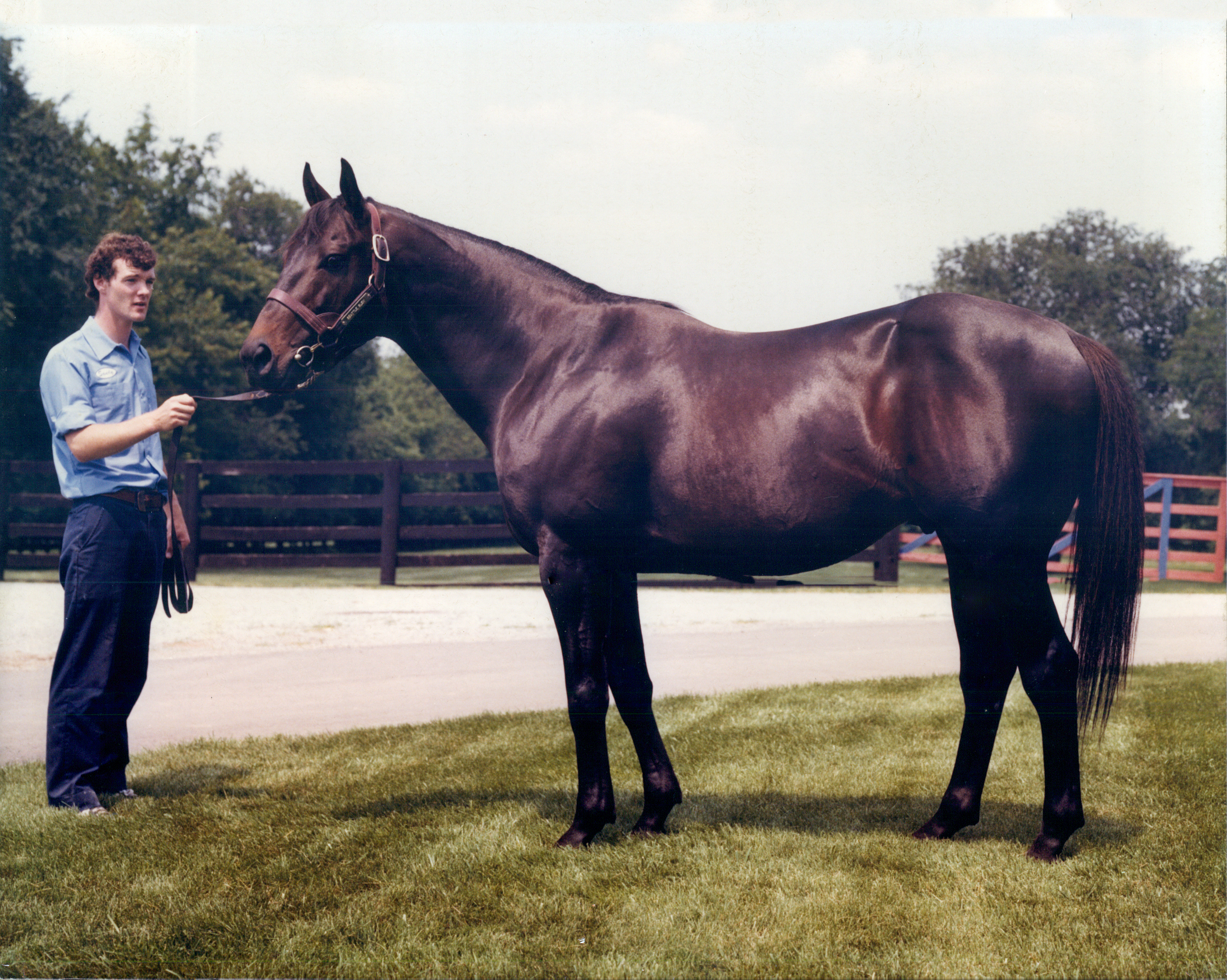
Seattle Slew, whose final race was a win in the 1978 Stuyvesant Handicap

Stuyvesant Handicap Locations & Distances
Year(s)	Location	Distance
1916–1918	Jamaica Race Course	6 furlongs (3/4 mile)
1919–1924	Jamaica Race Course	8 furlongs (1 mile)
1925–1936	not run	
1937–1939	Jamaica Race Course	6 furlongs (3/4 mile)
1940–1962	not run	
1963	Aqueduct Racetrack	9 furlongs (1 1/8 mile)
1964–1972	Aqueduct Racetrack	8 furlongs (1 mile)
1973–1989	Aqueduct Racetrack	9 furlongs (1 1/8 mile)
1990	Belmont Park	9 furlongs (1 1/8 mile)
1991–1994	Aqueduct Racetrack	9 furlongs (1 1/8 mile)
1995	Belmont Park	9 furlongs (1 1/8 mile)
1996–2000	Aqueduct Racetrack	9 furlongs (1 1/8 mile)
2001	Belmont Park	9 furlongs (1 1/8 mile)
2002–2008	Aqueduct Racetrack	9 furlongs (1 1/8 mile)

Notice in the Brooklyn Daily Times of May 20, 1918, for the Stuyvesant Handicap

August Belmont Jr.'s colt Fernrock won the May 23, 1916, inaugural edition of the Stuyvesant Handicap against what the Daily Racing Form described as "an above average field."

In 1920, with only one competitor willing to challenge him, the great Man o' War was sent off at odds of 1 to 100, the shortest odds in the history of American racing. Under a tight rein, he merely toyed with his opponent but still won by ten lengths.

Kentucky Derby and Belmont Stakes winner Riva Ridge set a new track record of 1:47 flat for 1 1/8 miles (9 furlongs) on dirt in winning the 1973 edition of the Stuyvesant Handicap.

The 1978 running marked the final race for the legendary Seattle Slew, the 1977 American Triple Crown winner. Seattle Slew, ridden by Angel Cordero Jr., won the race by four lengths. Sportscaster and Aqueduct track announcer Chic Anderson called the race's climax movingly: "Ladies and gentlemen, here he is, the champion of the world, Seattle Slew!"

The Stuyvesant Handicap had its final running on November 15, 2008, and was won by the gelding Dry Martini, owned by Carol Nyren. Dry Martini came from last to first to win by 3 1/4 lengths over Stud Muffin, whose damsire was Seattle Dancer. In 1985, Seattle Dancer was sold for $13.1 million, a price that then made him the most expensive yearling ever sold at public auction.

Another running of the race had been planned for November 14, 2009. However, with only five entrants and heavy rain forecast for race day, organizers cancelled the event on November 12, while also citing a general lack of interest. The 2009 race was not rescheduled, and the Stuyvesant Handicap has not been staged since.

== Records ==
Speed record:

- 1:34.00 @ 1 mile – Icecapade (1972)
- 1:47.00 @ 1 1/8 miles – Riva Ridge (1973)

Most wins:

- no horse ever won this race more than once

Most wins by a jockey:

- 3 – Eddie Maple (1972, 1973, 1977)
- 3 – Jerry Bailey (1979, 1983, 1989)
- 3 – Mike E. Smith (1990, 1995, 1999)
- 3 – John R. Velazquez (1992, 1993, 2001)

Most wins by a trainer:

- 3 – MacKenzie Miller (1971, 1979, 1983)

Most wins by an owner:

- 2 – August Belmont Jr. (1916, 1924)
- 2 – Wheatley Stable (1938, 1969)
- 2 – Loblolly Stable (1977, 1986)
- 2 – Rokeby Stables (1979, 1983)
- 2 – Dogwood Stable (1991, 1994)

== Winners ==
Year	Winner	Age	Jockey	Trainer	Owner	Dist. (Miles)	Time	Win$	Gr.
2008	Dry Martini	5	Channing Hill	William H. Turner Jr.	Carol Nyren	11/8 m	1:51.18	$66,300	G3
2007	Hunting	4	Alan Garcia	C. R. McGaughey III	Stuart S. Janney III	11/8 m	1:48.08	$65,100	G3
2006	Accountforthegold	4	Mike Luzzi	Gary C. Contessa	Winning Move Stable & Harold Lerner	11/8 m	1:48.80	$66,060	G3
2005	Evening Attire	7	José A. Santos	Patrick J. Kelly	Joseph & Mary Grant, Thomas J. Kelly	11/8 m	1:51.20	$65,160	G3
2004	Classic Endeavor	6	Edgar Prado	Richard E. Dutrow Jr.	Sullivan Lane Stable et al.	11/8 m	1:49.60	$65,940	G3
2003	Presidentialaffair	4	Richard Migliore	Martin Ciresa	Papandrea, Ciresa	11/8 m	1:50.80	$66,180	G3
2002	Snake Mountain	4	José A. Santos	James A. Jerkens	Berkshire Stud et al.	11/8 m	1:50.40	$68,040	G3
2001	Graeme Hall	4	John Velazquez	Todd Pletcher	Eugene Melnyk	11/8 m	1:47.80	$64,620	G3
2000	Lager	6	Herberto Castillo Jr.	James A. Jerkens	Susan & John Moore	11/8 m	1:50.00	$64,860	G3
1999	Best of Luck	3	Mike E. Smith	H. Allen Jerkens	Bohemia Stable	11/8 m	1:49.60	$67,200	G3
1998	Mr. Sinatra	4	Aaron Gryder	Gasper Moschera	Barbara J. Davis	11/8 m	1:48.00	$65,280	G3
1997	Delay of Game	4	Jean-Luc Samyn	George R. Arnold II	John H. Peace	11/8 m	1:47.60	$66,060	G3
1996	Poor But Honest	6	Jorge F. Chavez	Juan Serey	Vincent S. Scuderi	11/8 m	1:49.40	$66,480	G3
1995	Silver Fox	4	Mike E. Smith	Anthony Margotta	William Blasland Jr.	11/8 m	1:48.00	$68,940	G3
1994	Wallenda	4	Herb McCauley	Frank A. Alexander	Dogwood Stable	11/8 m	1:50.69	$64,560	G3
1993	Michelle Can Pass	5	John Velazquez	John M. DeStefano Jr.	Jay Cee Jay Stable	11/8 m	1:51.00	$70,200	G3
1992	Shot's Are Ringing	5	John Velazquez	Peter R. Ferriola	Jewel E Stable	11/8 m	1:49.20	$69,120	G3
1991	Montubio	6	Julio Pezua	Angel Penna Jr.	Dogwood Stable	11/8 m	1:48.20	$72,480	G3
1990	I'm Sky High	4	Mike E. Smith	Edward I. Kelly	Brookfield Farm	11/8 m	1:48.20	$71,760	G3
1989	Its Academic	5	Jerry D. Bailey	Luis Barrera	Marcus Vogel	11/8 m	1:48.80	$70,560	G2
1988	Talinum	4	Marco Castaneda	D. Wayne Lukas	John G. Sikura	11/8 m	1:51.20	$112,240	G2
1987	Moment of Hope	4	Michael Venezia	Bob G. Dunham	Four Fifths Stable (Robert Shapiro)	11/8 m	1:49.60	$109,080	G2
1986	Little Missouri	4	Robbie Davis	George R. Arnold II	Loblolly Stable	11/8 m	1:50.00	$125,280	G2
1985	Garthorn	5	Rafael Meza	Robert J. Frankel	Jerry Moss	11/8 m	1:48.40	$70,320	G2
1984	Valiant Lark	4	Vince Bracciale Jr.	Henry L. Carroll	Dee-Jo-Stable (Basil J. Plasteras)	11/8 m	1:51.40	$70,080	G2
1983	Fit to Fight	4	Jerry D. Bailey	MacKenzie Miller	Rokeby Stable	11/8 m	1:49.00	$68,280	G2
1982	Engine One	4	Ruben Hernandez	Sylvester E. Veitch	Benjamin F. Ferguson II	11/8 m	1:49.60	$67,200	G3
1981	Idyll	4	Cash Asmussen	Jan H. Nerud	Tartan Stable	11/8 m	1:48.80	$68,280	G3
1980	Plugged Nickle	3	Cash Asmussen	Thomas J. Kelly	John M. Schiff	11/8 m	1:50.20	$68,880	G3
1979	Music of Time	4	Jerry D. Bailey	MacKenzie Miller	Rokeby Stable	11/8 m	1:50.40	$68,280	G3
1978	Seattle Slew	4	Angel Cordero Jr.	Douglas R. Peterson	Tayhill Stable (Karen & Mickey Taylor & Dr. Jim Hill)	11/8 m	1:47.40	$62,310	G3
1977	Cox's Ridge	3	Eddie Maple	Joseph B. Cantey	Loblolly Stable	11/8 m	1:48.40	$32,760	G3
1976	Distant Land	4	Heliodoro Gustines	William J. Hirsch	King Ranch	11/8 m	1:49.00	$32,610	G3
1975	Festive Mood	6	Herberto Hinojosa	Richard W. Small	Sally M. Gibson	11/8 m	1:48.40	$33,210	G3
1974	Crafty Khale	5	Jean Cruguet	Robert L. Dotter	Mrs. Nelson I. Asiel	11/8 m	1:48.00	$34,890	G3
1973	Riva Ridge	4	Eddie Maple	Lucien Laurin	Meadow Stable	11/8 m	1:47.00	$34,470	G3
1972	Icecapade	3	Eddie Maple	David A. Whiteley	Locust Hill Farm	1 m	1:34.00	$36,570	
1971	Red Reality	5	Laffit Pincay Jr.	MacKenzie Miller	Cragwood Stables	1 m	1:34.60	$36,300	
1970	Never Bow	4	Eddie Belmonte	H. Allen Jerkens	Hobeau Farm	1 m	1:35.80	$36,420	
1969	King Emperor	3	Carlos H. Marquez	Edward A. Neloy	Wheatley Stable	1 m	1:34.40	$39,520	
1968	Spring Double	5	Chuck Baltazar	J. Bowes Bond	Woodside Stud (Alene Erlanger)	1 m	1:36.20	$38,480	
1967	Sun Gala	3	Ron Turcotte	Randy Sechrest	Gedney Farm (Harry P. Albert & Mrs. John T. Stanley)	1 m	1:36.80	$37,180	
1966	Understanding	3	Angel Cordero Jr.	Hirsch Jacobs	Ethel D. Jacobs	1 m	1:36.00	$37,765	
1965	Flag Raiser	3	Robert Ussery	Hirsch Jacobs	Isidor Bieber	1 m	1:35.60	$39,780	
1964	Macedonia	4	Heliodoro Gustines	Buddy Jacobson	Mrs. Samuel J. Lefrak	1 m	1:37.20	$18,623	
1963	Rocky Link	3	Sandino Hernandez	Stephen A. DiMauro	Golden Triangle Stable	11/8 m	1:49.20	$18,298	
Race not held (1940–1962)
1939	T. M. Dorsett	3	Leon Haas	John B. Theall	Dorothy Dorsett Brown	6 f	1:12.20	$3,925	
1938	Merry Lassie	3	James Stout	James E. Fitzsimmons	Wheatley Stable	6 f	1:11.00	$3,700	
1937	Chicolorado	3	Eddie Arcaro	William Brennan	Greentree Stable	6 f	1:13.00	$4,425	
Race not held (1925–1936)
1924	Ordinance	3	Edward Legere	Louis Feustel	August Belmont Jr.	1 m	1:38.40	$4,650	
1923	Dot	3	Earl Sande	Nat L. Byer	Jake Byer	1 m	1:39.40	$4,650	
1922	Snob II	3	Earl Sande	Hollie Hughes	Sanford Stud Farms	1 m	1:39.60	$4,650	
1921	Sedgefield	3	Frank Coltiletti	Thomas J. Healey	Richard T. Wilson Jr.	1 m	1:39.60	$4,650	
1920	Man o' War	3	Clarence Kummer	Louis Feustel	Glen Riddle Farm	1 m	1:41.60	$3,850	
1919	Purchase	3	Johnny Loftus	Sam Hildreth	Sam Hildreth	1 m	1:38.80	$3,850	
1918	Motor Cop	3	Johnny Loftus	Walter B. Jennings	A. Kingsley Macomber	6 f	1:12.20	$2,825	
1917	Julialeon	3	Roscoe Troxler	Max Hirsch	George W. Loft	6 f	1:14.80	$3,175	
1916	Fernrock	3	Everett Haynes	Sam Hildreth	August Belmont Jr.	6 f	1:13.00	$2,350	
