= Tessa Pullan =

English sculptor

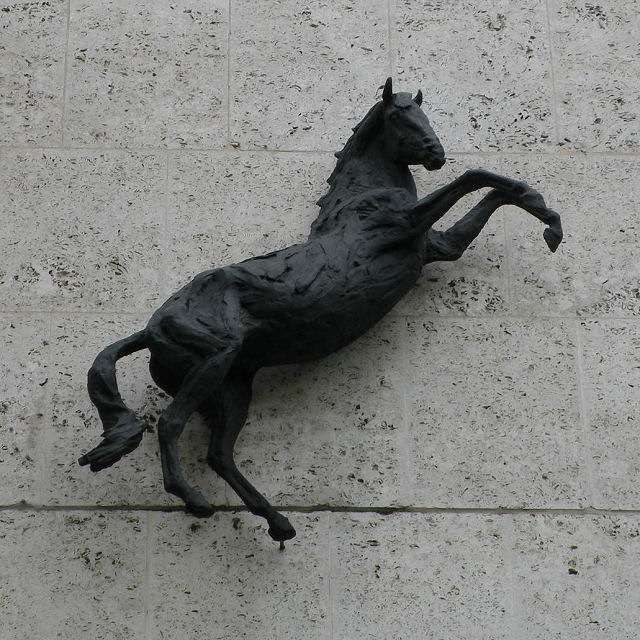
Bronze statue of a horse (1977) on a Lloyds Bank building in Cambridge; the bank's emblem is a black horse

Tessa Pullan (born 1953) is an English sculptor.

== Biography ==
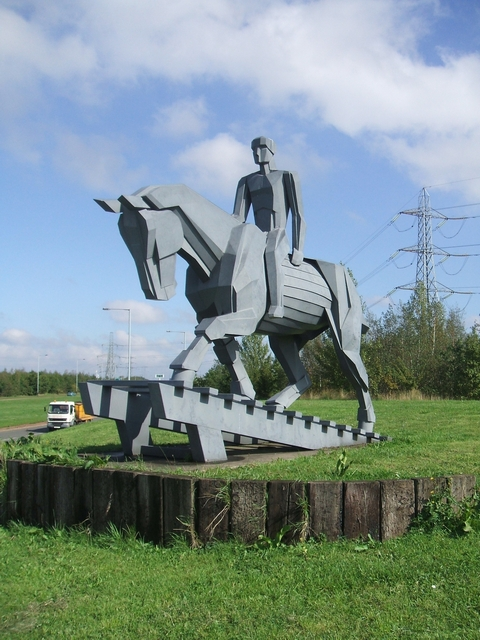
Horse and Rider on the Black Country Route

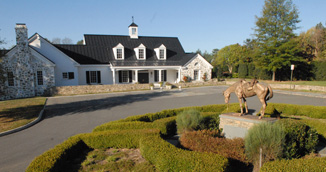
Civil War Horse at the National Sporting Library & Museum

Pullan was from 1971 to 1974 in France apprenticed to the sculptor John Skeaping and then gained a diploma from 1974 to 1977 at the City and Guilds of London Art School. She studied from 1977 to 1980 at the Royal Academy of Arts in London.

Her first exhibition took place in 1976 at London's Guildhall Art Gallery. In 1980 she started her first studio. The philanthropist and horse breeder Paul Mellon commissioned the Civil War Horse for the National Sporting Library & Museum in Middleburg, Virginia, honouring the horses and mules who died during the American Civil War. Her bust of Mellon is in the National Portrait Gallery. She is now one of Britain's leading animal sculptors, working in a variety of media, but mainly bronze and wood. She also produces portraits. The artist has a studio in Barrowden, Rutland, since 1990 and studios in Sandwich, Aberystwyth and Berkhamsted.

She is a Fellow of the Royal Society of Sculptors (FRSS) and a member of the Society of Equestrian Artists.

== Equine sculptures ==
The racehorse, Sea Hero, won the Kentucky Derby in 1993 and Pullan was tasked with creating a sculpture of him at the National Sporting Library & Museum. Created in bronze, the horse is over 7 ft and 2 tons in weight.

The 1996 "Horse and Rider" galvanised steel statue on the Black Country Route, Wolverhampton was commissioned by Wolverhampton City Council. Pullan carved the sculpture using wood and then the model was scaled up and produced in steel by Arden Fabrications of Knowle.

In the late 1990s, Pullan was commissioned by Paul Mellon to make a bronze statue of a Civil War horse. As part of her research, she contacted the Society for the Prevention of Cruelty to Animals for images of abused horses to influence the exhausted appearance of the statue. On 17 September 1997, the statue was unveiled by the Virginia Historical Society. The full-size statue is currently located outside the Virginia Museum of History & Culture in Richmond, Virginia, and two 3/4 size versions are located in Middleburg, Virginia, and Fort Riley, Kansas.

== Some works ==
- Untitled (1977) Gonville Place in Cambridge
- 1993 Kentucky Derby winner Sea Hero (1993), Rokeby Stables, Upperville in Fauquier County, Virginia
- Civil War Horse (1997): 1: (full-size) Virginia Museum of History & Culture in Richmond, Virginia; 2: (3/4 size) National Sporting Library in Middleburg, Virginia; 3: (3/4 size) U.S. Cavalry Museum at Fort Riley, Kansas.
- Horse and Rider, The Lunt, Bilston
