= 1993 Kentucky Derby =

Horse race

119th Kentucky Derby
- Kentucky Derby
- Location: Churchill Downs
- Date: May 1, 1993
- Winning horse: Sea Hero
- Jockey: Jerry Bailey
- Trainer: MacKenzie Miller
- Owner: Rokeby Stables
- Conditions: Fast
- Surface: Dirt
- Attendance: 136,817

The 1993 Kentucky Derby was the 119th running of the Kentucky Derby. The race took place on May 1, 1993, and there were 136,817 people in attendance.

== Payout ==
The 119th Kentucky Derby Payout Schedule

Program Number	Horse Name	Win	Place	Show
6	Sea Hero	US$27.80	$12.80	$8.00
5	Prairie Bayou	-	$7.20	$4.80
16	Wild Gale	-	-	$4.20

- $2 Exacta: (6-5) Paid $190.60

== Full results ==
Finished	Post	Horse	Jockey	Trainer	Owner	Time / behind
1st	6	Sea Hero	Jerry Bailey	Mack Miller	Rokeby Stable	2:02:42
2nd	5	Prairie Bayou	Mike E. Smith	Thomas Bohannan	Loblolly Stable	
3rd	13	Wild Gale	Shane Sellers	Michael Doyle	Little Fish Stable	
4th	7	Personal Hope	Gary Stevens	Mark A. Hennig	Debi & Lee Lewis	
5th	18	Diazo	Kent Desormeaux	Bill Shoemaker	Allen Paulson	
6th	17	Corby	Chris McCarron	John W. Sadler	Allen Paulson	
7th	2	Kissin Kris	José A. Santos	David Bell	John Franks	
8th	9	Silver of Silver	Jacinto Vásquez	Stanley Shapoff	Chevalier Stable	
9th	14	Ragtime Rebel	Robert Lester	Cliff Darnell	Ron Childress	
10th	3	Truth of it All	John Velazquez	Sheldon Wolfe	Alexander Schmidt	
11th	10	Bull In the Heather	Wigberto Ramos	Howard M. Tesher	Arthur Klein	
12th	15	Dixieland Heat	Randy Romero	Gerald Romero	Leland Cook	
13th	16	Wallenda	Pat Day	Frank A. Alexander	Dogwood Stable	
14th	12	Mi Cielo	Aaron Gryder	Peter Vestal	Thomas Carey	
15th	4	Union City	Pat Valenzuela	D. Wayne Lukas	Overbrook Farm	
16th	1	Storm Tower	Rick Wilson	Benjamin W. Perkins, Jr.	Char-Mari Stable	
17th	8	Rockamundo	Calvin Borel	Orin Glass, Jr.	Gary & Mary West	
18th	19	El Bakan	Craig Perret	Alfredo Callejas	Robert Perez	
19th	11	Tossofthecoin	Laffit Pincay, Jr.	Thomas Bell II	Sidney Craig	
