= Vanlandingham =

American-bred Thoroughbred racehorse

- Sire: Cox's Ridge
- Grandsire: Best Turn
- Dam: Populi
- Damsire: Star Envoy
- Sex: Stallion
- Foaled: 1981
- Country: United States
- Colour: Bay
- Breeder: Loblolly Stable
- Owner: Loblolly Stable
- Trainer: Claude R. McGaughey III
- Record: 19: 10-3-3
- Earnings: US$1,409,476

Major wins
- Rebel Handicap (1984); Jockey Club Gold Cup (1985); Stephen Foster Handicap (1985); Suburban Handicap (1985); Washington, D.C. International Stakes (1985); Canadian Turf Handicap (1986)

Awards
- American Champion Older Male Horse (1985)

Honours
- Vanlandingham Stakes at Pimlico Race Course

Vanlandingham (foaled April 28, 1981, in Kentucky) was an American Champion Thoroughbred racehorse.

== Background ==
Owned by Arkansas businessman John Ed Anthony, Vanlandingham was bred and raced by the Loblolly Stable. He was conditioned for racing by future U.S. Racing Hall of Fame trainer Shug McGaughey, who told Sports Illustrated in an October 14, 1985, article that the colt suffered from tender feet that stung him.

== Racing career ==
=== 1984: three-year-old season ===
Racing at age three, Vanlandingham broke the Oaklawn Park track record in winning the March 1984 Rebel Handicap. Sent to the Kentucky Derby, the colt fractured a pastern in his right foreleg during the race and finished sixteenth. The injury kept him out of racing for the next thirteen months.

=== 1985: Championship year ===
In 1985, Vanlandingham won Grade I races on both dirt and turf. After he won the Suburban Handicap and the Jockey Club Gold Cup, his owner supplemented him for a fee of $360,000 to the November 2 Breeders' Cup Classic. Running at Aqueduct Racetrack that year, Vanlandingham finished seventh in the eight-horse field. Fourteen days later, the horse made his first start on grass at Laurel Park Racecourse and, with jockey Don MacBeth aboard, won the prestigious Washington, D.C. International Stakes over a field of American and international turf stars. Vanlandingham's 1985 performances earned him the Eclipse Award as American Champion Older Male Horse, plus he finished third in the balloting behind Proud Truth and winner Spend A Buck for American Horse of the Year honors.

=== 1986: five-year-old season ===
Returning to racing in 1986 at age five, in his first start of the year Vanlandingham equaled the Gulfstream Park track record while winning the Canadian Turf Handicap. After finishing off the board in the March 2 Santa Anita Handicap, he sustained a career-ending injury to his left front pastern while competing in the April 6 Razorback Handicap at Oaklawn Park.

== Stud record ==
Retired to stud duty, Vanlandingham met with modest success as the sire of 151 winners of 508 races. After standing in the United States, he was sent to Saudi Arabia in 1996.
