= Wayne Chambers =

American jockey (1936–1999)

Personal information
- Born: October 29, 1936 Sasakwa, Oklahoma
- Died: November 18, 1999 (aged 63) Oklahoma City, Oklahoma
- Occupation: Jockey

Horse racing career
- Sport: Horse racing

Major racing wins
- Louisiana Derby (1960); Phoenix Handicap (1960); King Cotton Stakes (1962); Mountain Valley Stakes (1962); Pimlico Breeders' Stakes (1962); Rebel Stakes (1962); Black-Eyed Susan Stakes (1963); Jennings Handicap (1963); Kelly-Olympic Handicap (1963); Preakness Prep (1963); Royal Palm Handicap (1963); United Nations Handicap (1963); Washington, D.C. International Stakes (1963); Diamond State Handicap (1964); Marguerite Stakes (1964); Monmouth Handicap (1964); Royal Palm Handicap (1964); Selima Stakes (1964); Trenton Handicap (1964); Widener Handicap (1964); Miss Woodford Stakes (1965); Razorback Handicap (1967)

Racing awards
- Ak-Sar-Ben Champion Jockey (1957); Pimlico Champion Jockey (1963)

Significant horses
- Mongo, Nalee, Roman Brother, Tony Graff

Wayne Chambers (October 29, 1936 - November 18, 1999) was a jockey in American Thoroughbred horse racing best known for his success in 1963 and 1964 when he became the principal jockey for Mongo, a colt owned by Marion du Pont Scott's Montpelier Stable. A good rider on dirt or turf, Chambers' wins with Mongo included the top class event at Hialeah Park, the Widener Handicap and the United Nations Handicap at Monmouth Park. However, his biggest win came in the then very important Washington D.C. International, the precursor to the Breeders' Cup World Championships. Mongo was voted 1963 American Champion Turf Horse.

Wayne Chambers won a riding title in 1957 at Ak-Sar-Ben Racetrack and another in 1963 at Pimlico Race Course where he was up against some of the best jockeys of the day. He competed in the Kentucky Derby in 1960, 1964 and 1974. His best result was a fourth in the 1964 edition aboard Roman Brother which horse also gave Chambers his best result from two career starts in the ensuing Preakness Stakes.

In 1975 Wayne Chambers retired from racing and returned to live in his native Oklahoma where he died in 1999.
