= The Lunt =

Residential area of Bilston, West Midlands, England

Coordinates: 52.571°N 2.06°W

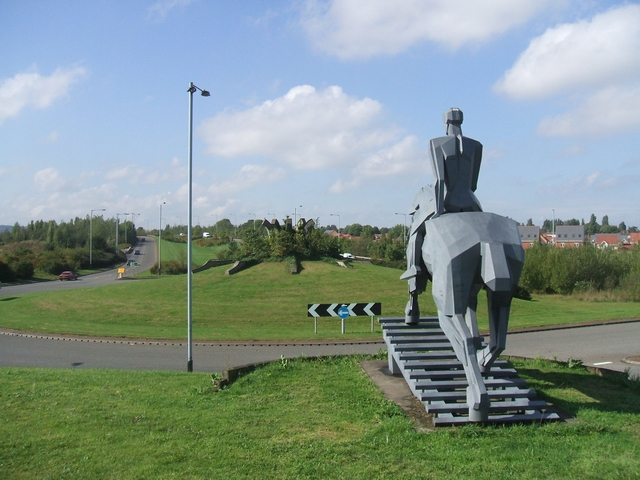
The "Horse and Rider" statue by Tessa Pullan in The Lunt

The Lunt is a residential area of Bilston within the city of Wolverhampton and is part of the West Midlands conurbation in England.

It was mostly laid out by the local council during the 1920s and 1930s, with houses being built to rehouse people from town centre slums. These houses featured electricity, running water, bathrooms and some with indoor toilets, things that were previously unknown to virtually all of their inhabitants.

There were also a few private houses built in the area, although council properties dominated the local scene, with 1,000 having been built by 1927.

In the 1990s, a street of houses on the east of the estate were demolished and replaced by a larger mix of private and rented homes.

Further demolition was planned a decade later, with a greater number of homes earmarked for demolition, but these plans were scrapped in 2007 and the homes will be renovated instead. However, demolition of another part of the estate took place during 2009.

The Lunt is situated near the A463 Black Country Route between Dudley and Walsall, which was completed in 1995.

Bilston Town FC play at their stadium in Queen Street, the home of the club since 1919, which has also been shared with other non-league sides over the course of its history. It was refurbished in 2007–8 to meet modern fire standards.
