= Oaklawn Handicap =

- Class: Grade II
- Location: Oaklawn Park Race Track; Hot Springs, Arkansas, United States
- Inaugurated: 1946
- Race type: Thoroughbred – Flat racing
- Website: www.oaklawn.com

Race information
- Distance: 1 1/8 miles (9 furlongs)
- Surface: Dirt
- Track: left-handed
- Qualification: Four-years-old & up
- Weight: Assigned
- Purse: $1,250,000 (2024)

The Oaklawn Handicap is an American Thoroughbred horse race held annually in April at Oaklawn Park Race Track in Hot Springs, Arkansas.

A Grade II event raced on dirt, since 1984 it has been contested over a distance of 1 1/8 miles (9 furlongs). It used to be raced at 1 1/16 miles (8.5 furlongs).

== Records ==
Track record: (at current distance of 1 1/8 miles)

- 1:46 3/5 – Snow Chief (1987) (New race and track record)

Most wins:

- 2 – Styrunner (1957, 1959)
- 2 – Gay Revoke (1964, 1965)

Most wins by a jockey:

- 5 – Pat Day (1982, 1983, 1984, 1985, 2001)

Most wins by a trainer:

- 4 – D. Wayne Lukas (1985, 1989, 2005, 2014)

Most wins by an owner:

- 4 – Allen E. Paulson (1990, 1995, 1996, 2000)

== Winners since 1969 ==
Year	Winner	Age	Jockey	Trainer	Owner	Time
2026	White Abarrio	7	Irad Ortiz Jr.	Saffie A. Joseph Jr.	C2 Racing Stable, Gary Barber & La Milagrosa Stable	1:47.49
2025	First Mission	5	Flavien Prat	Brad H. Cox	Godolphin Racing	1:49.09
2024	Skippylongstocking	5	José Ortiz	Saffie A. Joseph, Jr.	Daniel Alonso	1:49.00
2023	Proxy	5	Joel Rosario	Michael Stidham	Godolphin	1:49.68
2022	Last Samurai	4	Jon Court	Dallas Stewart	Willis Horton Racing	1:49.32
2021	Sliver State	4	Ricardo Santana Jr.	Steven M. Asmussen	Winchell Thoroughbreds & Willis Horton Racing	1:49.56
2020	By My Standards	4	Gabriel Saez	W. Bret Calhoun	Allied Racing Stable	1:47.80
2019	Quip	4	José Ortiz	Rodolphe Brisset	WinStar Farm, China Horse Club, & SF Racing	1:50.21
2018	City of Light	4	Drayden Van Dyke	Michael W. McCarthy	Mr. & Mrs. William K. Warren Jr.	1:48.26
2017	Inside Straight	4	Geovanni Franco	Robertino Diodoro	Randy Howg	1:48.40
2016	Effinex	5	Mike E. Smith	James A. Jerkens	Tri-Bone Stables	1:49.00
2015	Race Day	4	John R. Velazquez	Todd A. Pletcher	Matthew Schera	1:47.93
2014	Will Take Charge	4	Luis Saez	D. Wayne Lukas	Willis Horton Racing & Three Chimneys Farm	1:49.55
2013	Cyber Secret	4	Robby Albarado	Lynn S. Whiting	Charles J. Cella	1:49.67
2012	Alternation	4	Luis Quinonez	Donnie K. Von Hemel	Pin Oak Stable	1:49.94
2011	Win Willy	5	Cliff Berry	McLean Robertson	Jer-Mar Stable LLC	1:48.82
2010	Duke of Mischief	4	Eibar Coa	David Fawkes	John Lieblongs, JoAnn Lieblongs, M. McMaster & David Fawkes	1:49.14
2009	Runforthedoe †	4	Jon Court	Paulo H. Lobo	Stud TNT	1:48.96
2008	Tiago	4	Mike E. Smith	John Shirreffs	Jerome & Ann Moss	1:50.34
2007	Lawyer Ron	4	Edgar Prado	Todd A. Pletcher	Hines Racing LLC	1:49.00
2006	Buzzards Bay	4	Jose Valdivia Jr.	Ronald W. Ellis	Gary Broad	1:48.22
2005	Grand Reward	4	John Mckee	D. Wayne Lukas	Michael Tabor, Sue Magnier & Robert B.Lewis	1:49.54
2004	Peace Rules	4	Jerry Bailey	Robert J. Frankel	Edmund A. Gann	1:48.26
2003	Medaglia d'Oro	4	Jerry Bailey	Robert J. Frankel	Edmund A. Gann	1:47.66
2002	Kudos	5	Ed Delahoussaye	Richard Mandella	Jerome S. Moss	1:49.34
2001	Traditionally	4	Pat Day	Claude R. McGaughey III	Ogden Phipps	1:48.15
2000	K One King	4	Calvin Borel	Akiko Gothard	Allen E. Paulson & Madeleine A. Paulson	1:48.02
1999	Behrens	5	Jorge Chavez	H. James Bond	Rudlein Stable & W. Clifton	1:47.77
1998	Precocity	4	Carlos Gonzalez	Bobby C. Barnett	John A. Franks	1:48.28
1997	Atticus	5	Shane Sellers	Richard Mandella	La Presle Farm	1:48.22
1996	Geri	4	Jerry Bailey	William I. Mott	Allen E. Paulson	1:47.52
1995	Cigar	5	Jerry Bailey	William I. Mott	Allen E. Paulson	1:47.22
1994	The Wicked North	5	Kent Desormeaux	David Bernstein	P & S Hersh Trust	1:47.86
1993	Jovial	6	Ed Delahoussaye	Bruce C. Jackson	B. Jackson & J. Swift	1:48.63
1992	Best Pal	4	Kent Desormeaux	Gary F. Jones	Golden Eagle Farm	1:48.10
1991	Festin (ARG)	5	Ed Delahoussaye	Ron McAnally	Haras Sonoita	1:48.71
1990	Opening Verse	4	Chris McCarron	Richard J. Lundy	Allen E. Paulson	1:47.20
1989	Slew City Slew	5	Ángel Cordero Jr.	D. Wayne Lukas	J. Allen & Tayhill Stable	1:49.00
1988	Lost Code	4	Craig Perret	L. William Donovan	Wendover Stable	1:47.00
1987	Snow Chief	4	Alex Solis	Melvin F. Stute	Ben Rochelle & Est. Carl Grinstead	1:46.60
1986	Turkoman	4	Chris McCarron	Gary F. Jones	Saron Stable	1:47.40
1985	Imp Society	4	Pat Day	D. Wayne Lukas	Heslop Stable	1:48.40
1984	Wild Again	4	Pat Day	Vincent Timphony	Black Chip Stable	1:46.80
1983	Bold Style	4	Pat Day	Jack Van Berg	Louis B. Mayer	1:43.00
1982	Eminency	4	Pat Day	Joseph Cantey	Happy Valley Farm	1:44.00
1981	Temperence Hill	4	Eddie Maple	Joseph Cantey	Loblolly Stable	1:43.40
1980	Uncool	5	Jorge Velásquez	Jake J. Pletcher	Bradley & Przilas	1:44.40
1979	San Juan Hill	4	Don Brumfield	John M. Gaver Jr.	Greentree Stable	1:43.60
1978	Cox's Ridge	4	Eddie Maple	Joseph Cantey	Loblolly Stable	1:43.20
1977	Soy Numero Uno	4	Ray Broussard	Homer Pardue	Joseph R. Straus Sr. & Isadore Proler	1:42.40
1976	Master Derby	4	Darrel McHargue	Smiley Adams	Golden Chance Farm	1:41.60
1975	Warbucks	5	Danny Gargan	Don Combs	E. E. Elzemeyer	1:42.80
1974	Royal Knight	4	Ismael Valenzuela	Monti N. Sims	Kenneth Opstein	1:43.40
1973	Prince Astro	4	Danny W. Whited	John Dillard	C. L. Warner	1:43.60
1972	Gage Line	4	Larry Spindler	David R. Vance	Dan Lasater	1:44.60
1971	Rio Bravo	5	Fernando Valdizan	Roy J. Gillem	T. Allie & J. E. Grissom	1:42.20
1970	Charlie Jr.	4	Larry Snyder	Dewey Smith	T. Allie & J. E. Grissom	1:43.60
1969	Listado	5	Robert L. Baird	John O. Meaux	Harvey Peltier Sr.	1:45.00

* † In 2009, It's a Bird won the race but was later disqualified after testing positive for trace levels of naproxen, a non-steroidal anti-inflammatory drug.

== Earlier winners ==
- 1968 – Diplomat Way
- 1967 – Mike's Red
- 1966 – Swift Ruler
- 1965 – Gay Revoke
- 1964 – Gay Revoke
- 1963 – Wa-Wa Cy
- 1962 – Blue Croon
- 1961 – Santiago
- 1960 – Little Fitz
- 1959 – Styrunner
- 1958 – Manassas
- 1957 – Styrunner
- 1956 – Come On Red
- 1955 – No race
- 1954 – Andros
- 1953 – Our Challenge
- 1952 – Spur On
- 1951 – Boo Boo Shoo
- 1950 – Thwarted
- 1949 – Fancy Flyer
- 1948 – Dinner Hour
- 1947 – Sugar Beet
- 1946 – Lights Abeam
- 1944 – Challenge Me
