= Lynn S. Whiting =

American horse trainer

Personal information
- Born: June 28, 1939 Great Falls, Montana
- Died: April 19, 2017 (aged 77) Louisville, Kentucky
- Occupation: Trainer

Horse racing career
- Sport: Horse racing
- Career wins: 1,279

Major racing wins
- Jerome Handicap (1970); Louisville Handicap (1971, 1985); Derby Trial Stakes (1978, 1979); Clipsetta Stakes (1983); American Derby (1984); Arlington Classic (1984); Haskell Invitational Handicap (1984); Jim Bean Stakes (1984, 1987, 1992); Rebel Stakes (1985, 1997); Southwest Stakes (1985); Turfway Park Fall Championship Stakes (1986); Louisiana Derby (1987); Bachelor Stakes (1989, 1990, 2013); Martha Washington Stakes (1990); Dixie Belle Stakes (1991); Razorback Handicap (1993, 2013); Northern Spur Stakes (1994, 2000, 2011); Pennsylvania Derby (1995); Ack Ack Handicap (1997); New Orleans Handicap (1998); American Beauty Stakes (1999); Instant Racing Stakes (2004); Phoenix Stakes (2007); Smarty Jones Stakes (2010); Rainbow Miss Stakes (2012); Oaklawn Handicap (2013) U.S. Triple Crown wins: Kentucky Derby (1992)

Significant horses
- Lil E. Tee, At the Threshold, Phantom on Tour, Cyber Secret

Lynn S. Whiting (June 28, 1939 - April 19, 2017) was a trainer of Thoroughbred racehorses best known for his major upset win of the 1992 Kentucky Derby with the colt Lil E. Tee. Raised in the business, he was the son of jockey and trainer Lyle S. Whiting.
