= Proud Truth =

American-bred Thoroughbred racehorse

- Sire: Graustark
- Grandsire: Ribot
- Dam: Wake Robin
- Damsire: Summer Tan
- Sex: Stallion
- Foaled: 1982
- Country: United States
- Colour: Chestnut
- Breeder: Dorothy Firestone Galbreath
- Owner: Darby Dan Farm
- Trainer: John M. Veitch
- Record: 21: 10-4-0
- Earnings: $2,198,895

Major wins
- Fountain of Youth Stakes (1985); Florida Derby (1985); Peter Pan Stakes (1985); Discovery Handicap (1985); Tidal Handicap (1986); Breeders' Cup wins: Breeders' Cup Classic (1985)

Proud Truth (1982–2005) was an American Thoroughbred racehorse. He is most notable for his win in the 1985 Breeders' Cup Classic.

== Background ==
Proud Truth was bred by Dorothy Galbreath, wife of prominent horseman John W. Galbreath, at their Darby Dan Farm in Lexington, Kentucky. He was trained by John M. Veitch.

== Racing career ==
Proud Truth made two winning starts at age two. At three, he was one of the early favorites for the Kentucky Derby after he won the Fountain of Youth Stakes and Florida Derby. In his next start, he finished second in the Flamingo Stakes. In the Flamingo, Chief's Crown crossed the wire first but was disqualified for interference, moving Proud Truth up to the winning position. The owners of Chief's Crown then appealed to the Florida Division of Pari-Mutuel Wagering, which overturned the disqualification. Therefore, Chief's Crown was reinstated as the Flamingo winner, and Proud Truth officially finished second in that race. In Proud Truth's final start prior to the Kentucky Derby, he finished second in the Wood Memorial Stakes. In the Derby, he had a rough trip in the thirteen-horse field and finished fifth to Spend A Buck. He did not compete in the Preakness Stakes, instead focusing on the longest of the Triple Crown races, the Belmont Stakes. As a tune-up, Proud Truth won the Peter Pan Stakes but suffered a fracture in his left front leg and was unable to race in the Belmont.

Recovered from his injury, Proud Truth returned to racing in the fall of 1985 and won an allowance race, followed by a victory in the Grade III Discovery Handicap. In the Breeders' Cup Classic, he was sent off as the fifth betting choice in an eight-horse field. Under jockey Jorge Velásquez, he came from last place to defeat a strong field that included heavy favorite Chief's Crown, Gate Dancer, which finished second by a head, Turkoman, and Vanlandingham.

Proud Truth returned to racing at age four in 1986. Of his eight starts, his best performances were a second by a nose in the Grade I Gulfstream Park Handicap and a win in his turf debut in the Tidal Handicap at Belmont Park. He came out of his final race with an injury and was retired to stud duty at Darby Dan Farm for the 1987 season.

== Stud record ==
In 1991, Proud Truth was sent to stand at Corbett Farm near Monkton, Maryland then in 1999 to Haras Cerro Punta in Cerro Punta, Chiriquí, Panama for new owner Fernando Eleta Almarán. He sired a number of North American stakes winners including Truth of It All who was voted the 1992 Canadian Sovereign Award for Champion 2-Year-Old Male Horse. In Panama he met with considerable success, siring six champions, including Spago who won the 2004 Panamanian Triple Crown and was voted Horse of the Year honors.

Proud Truth died at Haras Cerro Punta on August 15, 2005, following a bout of severe colic. He is buried there in a pasture.

== Pedigree ==
Pedigree of Proud Truth, Chestnut colt, 1982
Sire Graustark	Ribot	Tenerani	Bellini
Sire Graustark	Ribot	Tenerani	Tofanella
Sire Graustark	Ribot	Romanella	El Greco
Sire Graustark	Ribot	Romanella	Barbara Burrini
Sire Graustark	Flower Bowl	Alibhai	Hyperion*
Sire Graustark	Flower Bowl	Alibhai	Teresina
Sire Graustark	Flower Bowl	Flower Bed	Beau Pere
Sire Graustark	Flower Bowl	Flower Bed	Boudoir
Dam Wake Robin	Summer Tan	Heliopolis	Hyperion*
Dam Wake Robin	Summer Tan	Heliopolis	Drift
Dam Wake Robin	Summer Tan	Miss Zibby	Omaha
Dam Wake Robin	Summer Tan	Miss Zibby	Fairisk
Dam Wake Robin	War Ribbon	Bimelech	Black Toney
Dam Wake Robin	War Ribbon	Bimelech	La Troienne
Dam Wake Robin	War Ribbon	War Regalia	Man o' War
Dam Wake Robin	War Ribbon	War Regalia	Regal Lady (family: 8-g)

* Proud Truth is inbred 4S x 4D to the stallion Hyperion, meaning that he appears fourth generation on the sire side of his pedigree and fourth generation on the dam side of his pedigree.
