= Eddie Maple =

American jockey

Personal information
- Born: November 8, 1948 (age 77) Carrollton, Ohio, U.S.
- Occupation: Jockey

Horse racing career
- Sport: Horse racing
- Career wins: 4,398

Major racing wins
- Delaware Handicap; Florida Derby (1971); Juvenile Stakes (1971, 1976); Lawrence Realization Stakes (1971); National Stallion Stakes (1971); Saratoga Special Stakes (1971, 1979, 1981, 1983, 1993); Arlington Classic (1972); Hawthorne Gold Cup Handicap (1972); Remsen Stakes (1972, 1977, 1981, 1989); Saranac Handicap (1972, 1975, 1981, 1983, 1986, 1987, 1992); Carter Handicap (1973, 1977, 1981, 1986); Fall Highweight Handicap (1973); Ladies Handicap (1974, 1991); Metropolitan Handicap (1974, 1978, 1982); Hempstead Handicap (1975, 1977, 1983, 1986, 1992); Breeders' Futurity Stakes (1975, 1983, 1987); Manhattan Handicap (1975, 1980, 1995); Alabama Stakes (1976, 1981); Astoria Stakes (1976); Cowdin Stakes (1976, 1982, 1983, 1995); Dwyer Stakes (1976, 1982, 1987, 1989); Futurity Stakes (1976, 1983, 1987); Matron Stakes (1976, 1992); Suburban Handicap (1976, 1977); Great American Stakes (1977); Tremont Stakes (1977, 1984, 1994); Travers Stakes (1977, 1980, 1981); Bahamas Stakes (1978); Kentucky Oaks (1978); Oaklawn Handicap (1978, 1981); Wood Memorial Stakes (1978, 1983); Gazelle Handicap (1979, 1984); Bonnie Miss Stakes (1980, 1981, 1984); Jockey Club Gold Cup (1980); Super Derby (1980, 1985, 1986); Travers Stakes (1980, 1981); Black-Eyed Susan Stakes (1981); Damon Runyon Stakes (1981); Hollywood Derby (1981); Arlington-Washington Lassie Stakes (1982, 1983); Firenze Handicap (1982); Lexington Stakes (1982, 1987, 1990); Roamer Handicap (1982, 1986); Champagne Stakes (1983, 1987); Frizette Stakes (1983); Laurel Futurity (1983); Man O' War Stakes (1983); Monmouth Oaks (1983); Acorn Stakes (1984); Black Helen Handicap (1984, 1985, 1987); American Derby (1985); Gardenia Stakes (1985, 1989); Jerome Handicap (1985); Queen Elizabeth II Challenge Cup Stakes (1985); Stymie Handicap (1986); Withers Stakes (1987); Toboggan Handicap (1990); Arlington Million (1995) American Classic Race wins: Belmont Stakes (1980, 1985) International races wins: Canadian International Stakes (1973, 1982); Premio Ambrosiano (1991); Premio Regina Elena (1991)

Racing awards
- George Woolf Memorial Jockey Award (1995); Mike Venezia Memorial Award (1998)

Honours
- U.S. Racing Hall of Fame (2009)

Significant horses
- Alydar, Conquistador Cielo, Cox's Ridge, Creme Fraiche, Devil's Bag, Droll Role, Foolish Pleasure, Forty Niner, Majesty's Prince, Riva Ridge, Secretariat, Sky Beauty, Slew o' Gold, Swale, Temperence Hill
- Updated on April 19, 2009

Edward Retz "Eddie" Maple (born November 8, 1948, in Carrollton, Ohio) is a retired American thoroughbred horse racing jockey. One of eight siblings, he is an older brother of jockey Sam Maple who won more than 2,500 races.

Maple began riding horses at age 12, and won his first race as a professional at age 17 at Ascot Park in Akron. Ohio. He spent his early career in Ohio and West Virginia, moving to tracks in New Jersey in 1970, but then relocated to New York in 1971.

Maple was the jockey for Hall of Fame horse Riva Ridge in the 1973 Marlboro Cup, getting the ride when regular jockey Ron Turcotte rode Secretariat to victory in the same race. His strong 2nd-place performance earned him the opportunity of a lifetime later that year, when Turcotte was suspended from riding for five days; Maple rode Secretariat to victory in his last race, the Canadian International Stakes at Woodbine Racetrack. In 1982, Maple scored his second win in the Canadian International with Majesty's Prince.

In 1980, Maple won the Belmont Stakes aboard Temperence Hill, and won again in 1985 on Creme Fraiche. He competed in nine Kentucky Derbys, his best finish being a second place in 1982 behind winner Gato Del Sol. Among his other major victories, Maple won the Travers Stakes three times, the Kentucky Oaks, the Arlington Million, and the 1991 Italian 1,000 Guineas (Premio Regina Elena) in Rome, Italy.

In 1995, Maple was voted the George Woolf Memorial Jockey Award, and in 1998, the Mike Venezia Memorial Award. He retired in 1998 with 4,398 wins. He and his wife ran a retail home and garden store on Long Island, New York until 2005, when they sold the business and took on the position of General Manager at the Rose Hill Plantation Equestrian Boarding And Teaching Center in Bluffton, South Carolina.

Maple was inducted into the National Racing Hall of Fame in 2009.
