= Peteski =

Canadian-bred Thoroughbred racehorse

- Sire: Affirmed
- Grandsire: Exclusive Native
- Dam: Vive
- Damsire: Nureyev
- Sex: Stallion
- Foaled: 1990
- Country: Canada
- Colour: Chestnut
- Breeder: Barry Schwartz
- Owner: Earle I. Mack
- Trainer: Roger Attfield
- Record: 11: 7-2-1
- Earnings: $1,287,866

Major wins
- Queen's Plate (1993); Prince of Wales Stakes (1993); Breeders' Stakes (1993); Molson Export Million (1993)

Awards
- 11th Canadian Triple Crown Champion (1993); Canadian 3-yr-Old Champion Colt (1993); Canadian Horse of the Year (1993); Canadian Horse Racing Hall of Fame (2009)
- Last updated on September 19, 2006

Peteski (1990–2001) was a Hall of Fame Champion Thoroughbred racehorse who won the Canadian Triple Crown in 1993. He was sired by the U.S. Triple Crown winner Affirmed, and was out of the mare Vive, a daughter of Nureyev.

Peteski was owned and raced by American businessman and future United States Ambassador to Finland Earle I. Mack. The colt made just one start as a 2-year-old, finishing fifth in a Maiden special weight race at Greenwood Raceway.

Following his Triple Crown win, Peteski met two of that year's U.S. Triple Crown race winners in September's Molson Million. Up against Kentucky Derby winner Sea Hero and Belmont Stakes winner Colonial Affair, Peteski won.

Retired from racing, Peteski stood at stud at Darby Dan Farm near Lexington, Kentucky until 2000, after which he was moved to Pin Oak Lane Farm near New Freedom, Pennsylvania. He met with modest success as a sire.

Peteski died of colic in 2001. His story can be found on his own website put up by Pin Oak Lane Farm.

Peteski was elected to the Canadian Horse Racing Hall of Fame in 2009.
