= Sea Hero =

American-bred Thoroughbred racehorse

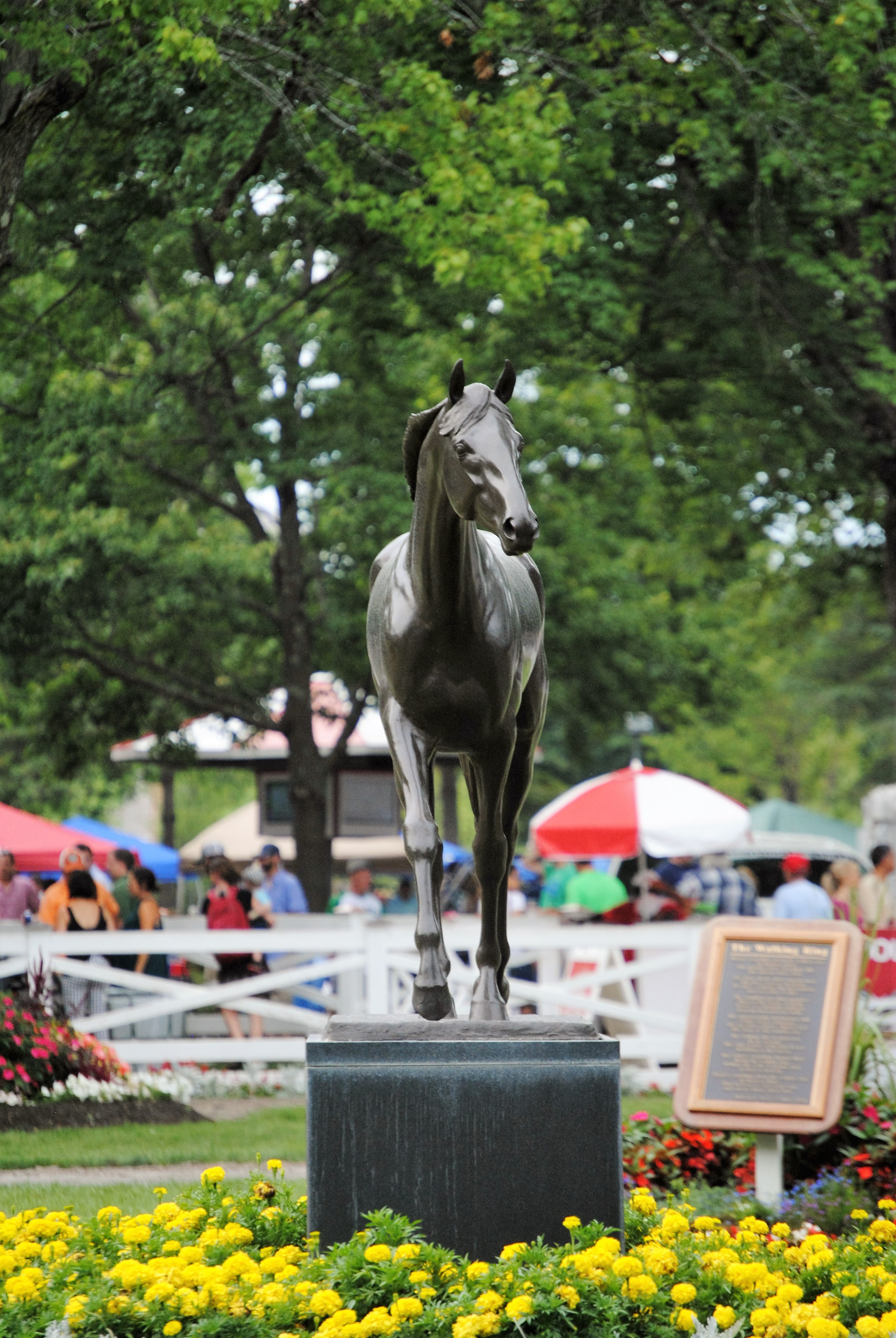
- Statue of Sea Hero at Saratoga Race Course
- Sire: Polish Navy
- Grandsire: Danzig
- Dam: Glowing Tribute
- Damsire: Graustark
- Sex: Stallion
- Foaled: March 3, 1990
- Died: July 2019 (age 29)
- Country: United States
- Colour: Bay
- Breeder: Paul Mellon
- Owner: Rokeby Stables. Silks: Dark Gray, Yellow Braid, Sleeves and Cap.
- Trainer: MacKenzie Miller
- Record: 24: 6-3-4
- Earnings: $2,929,869

Major wins
- Champagne Stakes (1992); Travers Stakes (1993) American Classic Race wins: Kentucky Derby (1993)

Honours
- Life-size statue at Saratoga Race Course; Sea Hero Road, Frankfort, Kentucky; Sea Hero Court in Napa, California; Bronze statue at National Sporting Library
- Last updated on December 9, 2007

Sea Hero (foaled March 4, 1990 – July 12, 2019) was an American-bred Thoroughbred racehorse best known for winning the 1993 Kentucky Derby and Travers Stakes. Beginning in 2011, Sea Hero was the oldest living winner of the Kentucky Derby until his death in 2019.

== Background ==
Sea Hero was bred in Virginia by Paul Mellon and raced for Mellon's Rokeby Stables. Sea Hero was by Polish Navy, who was a good racehorse but otherwise a disappointment as a sire. Sea Hero's dam was Glowing Tribute, who descended from one of the most distinguished thoroughbred families in North America – that of La Troienne. Glowing Tribute was named Kentucky Broodmare of the Year in 1993 after she had produced not only Sea Hero but graded stakes winners Hero's Honor, Wild Applause and Glowing Honor.

In 1992, Mellon, then aged 84, started dispersing most of his stock but kept Sea Hero, who was in training with MacKenzie Miller. Sea Hero was considered somewhat temperamental and had a habit of getting his tongue over the bit, forcing Miller to experiment with different equipment.

== Racing career ==
Sea Hero made his racing debut on July 13, 1992, in a maiden special weight race at Belmont Park, in which he finished fourth. He did not win his first race until September 7 in what was his fourth start, racing over 1 mile on the turf. He next won an allowance race on the turf then switched to dirt to win the Grade I Champagne Stakes. He finished the year with a seventh-place finish in the Breeders' Cup Juvenile.

At the start of his three-year-old campaign, Sea Hero was winless in his first three starts. His best result was a fourth-place finish in the Blue Grass Stakes to Prairie Bayou, who then became the lukewarm favorite for the Kentucky Derby. Sea Hero entered the Derby as a 13-1 longshot and pulled off the upset by 2 1/2 lengths over Prairie Bayou. It marked the first Derby win for jockey Jerry Bailey and for 71-year-old trainer Miller. It was also the first Derby win for Mellon, who became the only person to ever win the Kentucky Derby, The Derby, and the Prix de l'Arc de Triomphe, having captured the latter two with Mill Reef in 1971.

Following his Derby win, Sea Hero finished fifth in the Preakness and seventh in the Belmont but still earned a $1 million bonus for leading the Triple Crown points standings after Prairie Bayou's breakdown in the Belmont. He then finished fourth in the Jim Dandy Stakes, thus entering the Travers with a three-race losing streak.

In the $1 million Travers Stakes, Sea Hero displayed an "uncanny sense of timing" by reverting to his form in the Kentucky Derby. He tracked behind the early pace, then angled wide to get running room. In the stretch, he sprinted to the lead for a two-length win over Kissin Kris, with Belmont Stakes winner Colonial Affair in fourth. Sea Hero became the first Derby winner to also win the Travers since Shut Out in 1942. It was the fifth Travers win for Rokeby Stable.

Sea Hero then shipped to Woodbine racetrack for the Molson Export Million, where he finished third to Canadian Triple Crown winner Peteski. He finished second in the Eclipse Award balloting for Champion three-year-old to Prairie Bayou, who had been more consistent in his brief career.

At age four, Sea Hero had one win from eight starts, plus a second-place finish in the Bowling Green Handicap on the turf.

=== Race statistics ===
Date	Track	Race	Grade	Distance	Finish	Time
7/13/1992	Belmont Park	Maiden Special Weight		5 1/2 furlongs	4	
8/2/1992	Saratoga	Maiden Special Weight		6 furlongs	5	
8/21/1992	Saratoga	Maiden Special Weight		7 furlongs	2	
9/7/1992	Belmont Park	Maiden Special Weight	(turf)	1 mile	1	1:35.42
9/21/1992	Belmont Park	Allowance	(turf)	1 mile	1	1:34.60
10/10/1992	Belmont Park	Champagne Stakes	I	1 mile	1	1:34.87
10/31/1992	Belmont Park	Breeders' Cup Juvenile	I	1 1/16 miles	7	
2/7/1993	Gulfstream Park	Palm Beach Stakes	III	1 1/16 miles	9	
2/25/1993	Gulfstream Park	Allowance		1 1/16 miles	3	
4/10/1993	Keeneland	Blue Grass Stakes	II	1 1/8 miles	4	
5/1/1993	Churchill Downs	Kentucky Derby	I	1 1/4 miles	1	2:02.42
5/15/1993	Pimlico	Preakness Stakes	I	1 3/16 miles	5	
6/5/1993	Belmont Park	Belmont Stakes	I	1 1/2 miles	7	
8/1/1993	Saratoga	Jim Dandy Stakes	II	1 1/8 miles	4	
8/21/1993	Saratoga Race Course	Travers Stakes	I	1 1/4 miles	1	2:01.95
9/19/1993	Woodbine	Molson Export Million	II	1 1/8 miles	3	
5/17/1994	Belmont Park	Allowance		7 furlongs	1	1:22.79
5/30/1994	Belmont Park	Allowance	(turf)	1 1/16 miles	2	
6/18/1994	Belmont Park	Brooklyn Handicap	II	1 1/8 miles	3	
7/2/1994	Belmont Park	Bowling Green Handicap	IIT	1 1/8 miles	2	
7/30/1994	Saratoga	Sword Dancer Invitational	IT	1 1/2 miles	7	
8/20/1994	Saratoga	Handicap	(turf)	1 1/8 miles	3	
9/3/1994	Belmont Park	Belmont Breeders' Cup Handicap	IIIT	1 1/16 miles	5	
10/15/1994	Keeneland	Fayette Stakes	IIT	1 1/8 miles	5	

== Retirement and stud career ==
Sea Hero was retired to stud at Lane's End Farm in 1995 but was considered a disappointment. Sea Hero did not sire a stakes winner until his second-crop became of racing age. In 1999, he was sold to Karacabey Pension Stud in Izmit, Turkey where he had better results, becoming the seventh all-time leading sire in Turkey by progeny earnings. He was a top 10 stallion for many years, ranking as high as #3 in 2007. He is the sire of fifteen stakes winners and has also proved a successful broodmare sire. Sea Hero was pensioned from stud duty in 2015.

According to statistics from the Jockey Club of Turkey, Sea Hero's progeny won 730 races and placed another 1,653 times in that country, amassing total earnings of 32,890,013 lira ($5,750,160). His lifetime progeny earnings worldwide total $19,165,928. Sea Hero sired 15 black-type winners and 23 black-type-placed runners, including two champions – one in Turkey and one in the Dominican Republic.

=== Top progeny ===
==== United States ====
- Cindy's Hero - Won Del Mar Debutante Stakes (G1)
- Hero's Tribute - Won Gulfstream Park Handicap, Peter Pan Stakes
- Desert Hero - Won San Rafael Stakes
- Hero's Pleasure - Won Manitoba Derby

==== Turkey ====
- Confidence - Won Caldiran Stakes (TURK - G1)
- Aeneas - Won Buyuk Taaruz Stakes (TUR - G2)
- Big Trouble - Won Uzunyayla Stakes (TUR - G3), F.L. Karaosmanoðlu (TUR - G3)
- Akdeniz Atesi - Won Büyük Taarruz Stakes (TUR - G3), Sait Akson (TUR - G3); finished second in 2010 Gazi Derby

== Honors ==
A bronze statue of Sea Hero stands in the paddock at Saratoga Race Course in Saratoga Springs, New York. In 2015, another statue by Tessa Pullan was installed at the National Sporting Library & Museum in Middleburg, Virginia. Sea Hero Road in Frankfort, Kentucky, is named for the horse, as is Sea Hero Court in Napa, California. Sea Hero Place in Austin, Texas, is also named for the Kentucky Derby winner.

== Death ==
Sea Hero died in July 2019 in Turkey at the age of 29, where he had lived since 1999. His death was attributed to infirmities of old age. At the time of his death, he had held the title of oldest living Kentucky Derby winner for 8 years.

== Pedigree ==
Pedigree of Sea Hero, bay horse, 1990
Sire Polish Navy 1984	Danzig; 1977	Northern Dancer (CAN)	Nearctic
Sire Polish Navy 1984	Danzig; 1977	Northern Dancer (CAN)	Natalma
Sire Polish Navy 1984	Danzig; 1977	Pas de Nom	Admiral's Voyage
Sire Polish Navy 1984	Danzig; 1977	Pas de Nom	Petitioner
Sire Polish Navy 1984	Navsup; 1966	Tatan	The Yuvaraj (GB)
Sire Polish Navy 1984	Navsup; 1966	Tatan	Valkyrie (GB)
Sire Polish Navy 1984	Navsup; 1966	Busanda	War Admiral
Sire Polish Navy 1984	Navsup; 1966	Busanda	Businesslike
Dam Glowing Tribute 1973	Graustark; 1963	Ribot	Tenerani
Dam Glowing Tribute 1973	Graustark; 1963	Ribot	Romanella
Dam Glowing Tribute 1973	Graustark; 1963	Flower Bowl	Alibhai
Dam Glowing Tribute 1973	Graustark; 1963	Flower Bowl	Flower Bed
Dam Glowing Tribute 1973	Admiring; 1962	Hail to Reason	Turn-to
Dam Glowing Tribute 1973	Admiring; 1962	Hail to Reason	Nothirdchance
Dam Glowing Tribute 1973	Admiring; 1962	Searching	War Admiral
Dam Glowing Tribute 1973	Admiring; 1962	Searching	Big Hurry (family: 1-x)

Sea Hero is inbred 4 × 4 to War Admiral, meaning War Admiral appears twice in the fourth generation of Sea Hero's pedigree. He is also inbred 5 × 5 to La Troienne through her daughters Businesslike and Big Hurry.
