= National Sporting Library & Museum =

Library and museum in Virginia, United States

Coordinates: 38.966973°N 77.739240°W

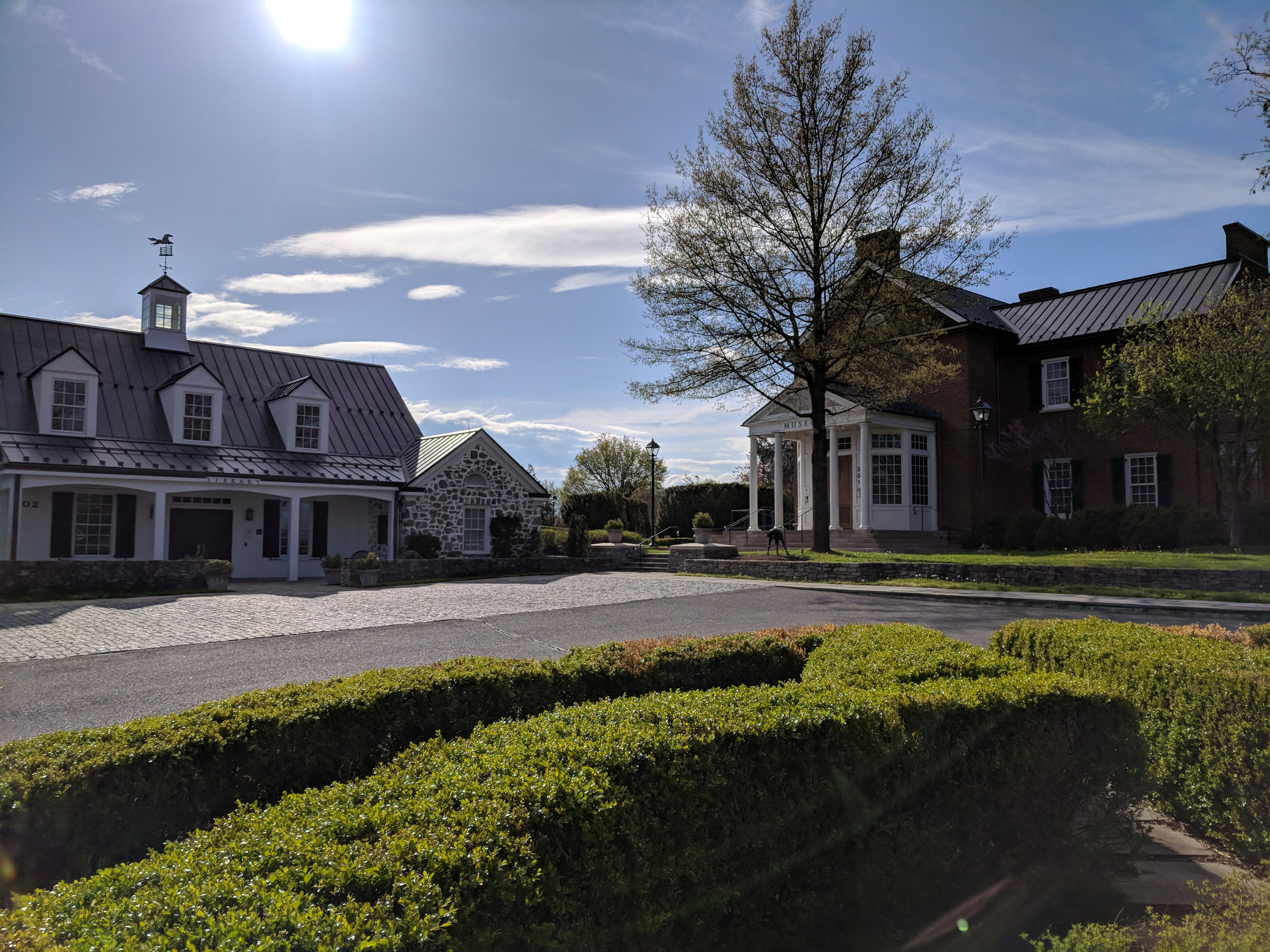
- Former name: National Sporting Library
- Established: March 29, 1954
- Location: 102 The Plains Road, Middleburg, VA 20117
- Type: Art museum
- Collection size: 20,000 books (as of 2018) 1,100 works of art (as of 2018)
- Visitors: 13,500
- Founders: George L. Ohrstrom, Sr., Alexander Mackay-Smith, Fletcher Harper, Lester Karow
- Executive director: Elizabeth von Hassell
- Curators: Claudia Pfeiffer (George L. Ohrstrom, Jr. Curator of Art)
- Website: www.nationalsporting.org

The National Sporting Library & Museum or NSLM (formerly the National Sporting Library) is a research library and art museum in Middleburg, Virginia, in the United States.

== History ==
The National Sporting Library was founded in 1954 in the personal library of George L. Ohrstrom, Sr. The founders of the National Sporting Library focused their new organization on accessibility of research materials on horse and field sports, finding other libraries on these topics to be insufficiently accessible to the public. The first president of the National Sporting Library was Fletcher Harper, long-time Master of the Orange County Hunt in The Plains, Virginia. Additional founders included Lester Karow, and Alexander Mackay-Smith, Editor of The Chronicle of the Horse. When Ohrstrom, Jr. died in 1955, his son, George L. Ohrstrom, Jr., became an officer of the library.

The National Sporting Library was originally housed in the Duffy House, located on Washington Street in Middleburg. An emblem with a fox mask, horseshoe, rifle, and fishing rod was designed to serve as the library's logo. The library grew its collections through donations, and when the collection outgrew the space in the library's building, the National Sporting Library moved to Vine Hill, built in 1804. During these years, the library shared space with the offices of The Chronicle. An underground, fire-proof vault with capacity for 6,000 volumes was installed in Vine Hill to house the library's rare titles.

The library was housed in Vine Hill from 1969 to 1999, when it moved to its current location, a new building resembling an English carriage house. The move was necessitated to house the library's growing collection, which included 16,000 volumes dating to the 17th Century and over 100 sporting art prints. Construction of the building took 18 months, and was completed in July 1999. The library moved its collections into the building in August 1999 and a grand opening was held on September 18, 1999. Funding for the library's new building came from many of the library's members, including a $1 million donation from Paul Mellon, who also donated a weather vane to be installed atop the building's cupola.

"Vine Hill," built in 1804, was expanded in 2009 to be the museum building of the National Sporting Library & Museum.

In 2009, the National Sporting Library re-branded as National Sporting Library & Museum (NSLM) and began expansion of Vine Hill to include 13,000 feet of art gallery space. The new museum opened on October 7, 2011, with the inaugural exhibition Afield in America: 400 Years of Animal & Sporting Art.

== Collections ==
=== Library collection ===
The NSLM's library collections include over 20,000 books, periodicals, archives, and ephemera objects. Overall, the collection dates to the 16th century, with rare and antiquarian titles housed in the library's F. Ambrose Clark Rare Book Room.

In 1995, the library received a gift of 5,000 rare and antiquarian books from John H. Daniels, CEO of Archer Daniels Midland and member of the library's board of directors. The gift included the library's earliest-printed book (published in 1523) and was a major factor in the move to a new library building. The Daniels collection is stored among the library's rare books and is one of several other named collections maintained at NSLM.

== Exhibitions ==
=== Afield in America: 400 Years of Animal & Sporting Art ===
The NSLM's inaugural exhibition was based on the 2008 book Animal & Sporting Artists in America by F. Turner Reuter, Jr. Animal & Sporting Artists in America was published by the National Sporting Library in 2009 and included an encyclopedic listing of over 2,300 animal and sporting artists who produced work in North America. Reuter served as guest curator for the exhibition, which featured works by many notable sporting an animal artists, including John James Audubon, Edward Troye, and Arthur Fitzwilliam Tait. The exhibition opened on October 8, 2011 and closed May 10, 2012. The exhibition opening drew over 400 visitors to the new museum, and the entire exhibition saw over 4,000 visitors.

=== Munnings: Out in the Open ===
Munnings: Out in the Open offered a selection of 68 open-air works by Sir Alfred Munnings. The exhibition was open from April 24 through September 15, 2013, and included 68 pieces of artwork from private collections and public institutions, including the Sir Alfred Munnings Art Museum, the Yale Center for British Art, the National Museum of Racing and Hall of Fame, and Pebble Hill Plantation. The exhibition opening included a screening of the film Summer in February, as well as an exhibit in the NSLM library of Munnings' letters and drawings.

=== The Horse in Ancient Greek Art ===
NSLM developed The Horse in Ancient Greek Art in partnership with the Virginia Museum of Fine Arts, exploring the depiction of equestrian sports in ancient Greek pottery from the 8th through 4th centuries BCE. The Horse in Ancient Greek Art featured more than 70 works from museums across the United States, as well as objects from private collections. The exhibition was co-curated by NSLM's Curator of Permanent Collections Nicole Stribling and VMFA's Jack and Mary Ann Frable Curator of Ancient Art Peter Schertz. More than 200 guests visited NSLM for the exhibition opening. The exhibition opened September 9, 2017 at the NSLM and closed January 14, 2018 before traveling to VMFA. The exhibition opened at VMFA on February 17, 2018, and closed on July 8, 2018. The exhibition's catalog was distributed worldwide by Yale University Press. In May 2018, The Horse in Ancient Greek Art was named "New Event of the Year" in the Visit Loudoun Awards.
