= Prairie Bayou =

American-bred Thoroughbred racehorse

- Sire: Little Missouri
- Grandsire: Cox's Ridge
- Dam: Whiffling
- Damsire: Wavering Monarch
- Sex: Gelding
- Foaled: March 4, 1990; Wintergreen Farm; Georgetown, Kentucky, U.S.
- Died: June 5, 1993 (aged 3); Elmont, New York, U.S.
- Country: United States
- Colour: Chestnut
- Breeder: Loblolly Stable
- Owner: Loblolly Stable
- Trainer: Thomas Bohannan
- Record: 12:7-3-0
- Earnings: $1,450,621

Major wins
- Count Fleet Stakes (1993); Whirlaway Stakes (1993); Jim Beam Stakes (1993); Blue Grass Stakes (1993) American Triple Crown wins: Preakness Stakes (1993); Kentucky Derby 2nd (1993)

Awards
- U.S. Champion 3-Yr-Old Colt (1993)

Honours
- Prairie Bayou Stakes at Turfway Park
- Last updated on August 4, 2007

Prairie Bayou (March 4, 1990 – June 5, 1993) was an American Thoroughbred Champion racehorse owned and bred by Loblolly Stable of Lake Hamilton, Arkansas. Named for a bayou between Little Rock and Hot Springs in Arkansas, he was sired by Little Missouri and out of the mare Whiffling. Owned by Loblolly Stable, after Prairie Bayou's success on the racetrack, including the 1993 Preakness Stakes, Calumet Farm purchased Whiffling in foal to Danzig for $1,050,000 at the 1994 Keeneland November Sale.

== Racing career ==
=== Early racing career ===
At age two Prairie Bayou won a maiden race and an allowance race. He went on to place second in his next two starts in stakes races. He finished as the runner-up in both the Inner Harbor Stakes and the Pappa Riccio Stakes. As a three-year-old he really began to show promise. He won the Count Fleet Stakes and the Whirlaway Stakes at Aqueduct in the first quarter of 1993. In March Prairie Bayou won the Spriral Stakes at Turfway Park. In April he won the grade one Blue Grass Stakes at Keeneland Race Course. Leading up to the 1993 Kentucky Derby, Prairie Bayou was made the betting favorite for the Derby, as well as for the other two Triple Crown races, Prairie Bayou was ridden by jockey Mike Smith. A come-from-behind horse, in the Derby he was caught far back in the large field for most of the race. In the final quarter, the gelding had to move to the far outside in order to make a strong stretch run that earned him a second-place finish behind Sea Hero.

=== Preakness Stakes and Death ===
Prairie Bayou came back to win the Preakness Stakes, the second leg of the U.S. Triple Crown, but then broke down in the Belmont Stakes and was euthanized. Mike Smith, the jockey aboard Prairie Bayou, leaped off the horse as he broke down, and was unable as a result to pull him up and avoid further injury. He is buried at Longfield Farm near Goshen, Kentucky.

== Pedigree ==
Pedigree of Prairie Bayou
Sire Little Missouri chestnut 1982	Cox's Ridge bay 1974	Best Turn brown 1966	Turn-To
Sire Little Missouri chestnut 1982	Cox's Ridge bay 1974	Best Turn brown 1966	Sweet Clementine
Sire Little Missouri chestnut 1982	Cox's Ridge bay 1974	Our Martha chestnut 1961	Ballydonnell
Sire Little Missouri chestnut 1982	Cox's Ridge bay 1974	Our Martha chestnut 1961	Corday
Sire Little Missouri chestnut 1982	Win Nona Chestnut 1976	Jacinto brown 1962	Bold Ruler
Sire Little Missouri chestnut 1982	Win Nona Chestnut 1976	Jacinto brown 1962	Cascade
Sire Little Missouri chestnut 1982	Win Nona Chestnut 1976	Constance Black bay 1957	On Trust
Sire Little Missouri chestnut 1982	Win Nona Chestnut 1976	Constance Black bay 1957	Perception
Dam Whiffling bay 1985	Wavering Monarch bay 1979	Majestic Light bay 1973	Majestic Prince
Dam Whiffling bay 1985	Wavering Monarch bay 1979	Majestic Light bay 1973	Irradiate
Dam Whiffling bay 1985	Wavering Monarch bay 1979	Uncommitted bay 1974	Buckpasser
Dam Whiffling bay 1985	Wavering Monarch bay 1979	Uncommitted bay 1974	Lady Be Good
Dam Whiffling bay 1985	Queen's Gambit dark brown 1972	Bold Ruler brown 1954	Nasrullah
Dam Whiffling bay 1985	Queen's Gambit dark brown 1972	Bold Ruler brown 1954	Miss Disco
Dam Whiffling bay 1985	Queen's Gambit dark brown 1972	So Social bay 1964	Tim Tam
Dam Whiffling bay 1985	Queen's Gambit dark brown 1972	So Social bay 1964	His Duchess
