= Temperence Hill =

American-bred Thoroughbred racehorse

- Sire: Stop The Music
- Grandsire: Hail To Reason
- Dam: Sister Shannon
- Damsire: Etonian
- Sex: Stallion
- Foaled: March 6, 1977
- Country: United States
- Colour: Bay
- Breeder: Dr. Albert F. Polk, Jr.
- Owner: Loblolly Stable
- Trainer: Joseph B. Cantey
- Record: 31: 11-4-2
- Earnings: $1,567,650

Major wins
- Rebel Stakes (1980); Arkansas Derby (1980); Jockey Club Gold Cup (1980); Super Derby (1980); Travers Stakes (1980); Oaklawn Handicap (1981); Razorback Handicap (1981); Suburban Handicap (1981) Triple Crown race wins: Belmont Stakes (1980)

Awards
- United States Champion 3-Yr-Old Colt (1980)
- Last updated on October 11, 2007

Temperence Hill (March 1977 – June 2003) was a Champion American Thoroughbred racehorse.

== Background ==
Temperence Hill was a bay horse bred in Kentucky by Dr. Albert F. Polk, Jr.'s Oriskany Farm. He was sired by Stop The Music out of the Etonian mare, Sister Shannon. He was named for a 19th-century Arkansas Methodist church that his owner's ancestors attended.

Temperence Hill was consigned to the 1978 Keeneland September yearling sale, where he was purchased and raced by Arkansas lumberman John Ed Anthony and his former wife, Mary Lynn Dudley under their Loblolly Stable colors. He was trained throughout his career by Joseph B. Cantey.

== Racing career ==
After showing strong potential throughout the spring of 1980, with wins in Kentucky Derby prep races, the Rebel Stakes and Arkansas Derby, Temperence Hill's breakthrough performance came in the 1980 Belmont Stakes where he defeated Kentucky Derby winner Genuine Risk and Preakness Stakes winner Codex at odds of 53-1. He went on to win several additional Grade I stakes and was voted Champion three-year-old of 1980.

== Stud record ==
Temperence Hill was retired after the 1981 racing season with career earnings of $1,567,650. He was syndicated and began his stallion career near Lexington, Kentucky at Gainesway Farm. In the early 1990s he was moved to Bonnerdale, Arkansas where he stood at D-Lan Farms and then Starr Farm. In the fall of 1996, he was sold to Thailand's only thoroughbred farm owner, Police General Sharlie Pekanan. Temperence Hill died peacefully in 2003 at SawangJai Farm 2 hours from Bangkok along the Friendship Highway near Bangkok, Thailand.

In 16 seasons of breeding in North America, Temperence Hill sired 3 foreign champions, 39 stakes winners, and 433 winners from 602 starters with total earnings of $26,538,905. The best of his runners was Temperate Sil who won the 1986 Hollywood Futurity and in 1987, the Santa Anita Derby and the Swaps Stakes.

== Pedigree ==
Pedigree of Temperence Hill
Sire Stop The Music b. 1970	Hail to Reason br. 1958	Turn-To b. 1951	Royal Charger
Sire Stop The Music b. 1970	Hail to Reason br. 1958	Turn-To b. 1951	Source Sucree
Sire Stop The Music b. 1970	Hail to Reason br. 1958	Nothirdchance b. 1948	Blue Swords
Sire Stop The Music b. 1970	Hail to Reason br. 1958	Nothirdchance b. 1948	Galla Colors
Sire Stop The Music b. 1970	Bebopper b. 1962	Tom Fool b. 1949	Menow
Sire Stop The Music b. 1970	Bebopper b. 1962	Tom Fool b. 1949	Gaga
Sire Stop The Music b. 1970	Bebopper b. 1962	Bebop b. 1957	Prince Bio
Sire Stop The Music b. 1970	Bebopper b. 1962	Bebop b. 1957	Cappellina
Dam Sister Shannon b. 1965	Etonian br. 1954	Owen Tudor br. 1938	Hyperion
Dam Sister Shannon b. 1965	Etonian br. 1954	Owen Tudor br. 1938	Mary Tudor
Dam Sister Shannon b. 1965	Etonian br. 1954	Windsor Whisper br. 1945	Windsor Slipper
Dam Sister Shannon b. 1965	Etonian br. 1954	Windsor Whisper br. 1945	Inkling
Dam Sister Shannon b. 1965	Idaliza b. 1957	Princely Gift b. 1951	Nasrullah
Dam Sister Shannon b. 1965	Idaliza b. 1957	Princely Gift b. 1951	Blue Gem
Dam Sister Shannon b. 1965	Idaliza b. 1957	Pearl Fishing br. 1947	Fair Copy
Dam Sister Shannon b. 1965	Idaliza b. 1957	Pearl Fishing br. 1947	Brinda
