= Thomas Bohannan =

American Thoroughbred racehorse trainer

Tom Bohannan
Personal information
- Born: c. 1955 Mobile, Alabama, United States
- Occupation: Trainer

Horse racing career
- Sport: Horse racing
- Career wins: 229

Major racing wins
- Diana Handicap (1990); Peter Pan Stakes (1991); Dwyer Stakes (1991); Haskell Invitational Handicap (1991); Nashua Stakes (1991, 1992); Arkansas Derby (1992); Honeybee Stakes (1992, 1993); Jim Beam Stakes (1993); Blue Grass Stakes (1993); Fantasy Stakes (1993) American Classic Race wins: Preakness Stakes (1992, 1993)

Significant horses
- Pine Bluff, Prairie Bayou
- Updated on April 24, 2007

Thomas K. Bohannan (born c.1955 in Mobile, Alabama) is an American Thoroughbred racehorse trainer. He grew up in Lexington, Kentucky and as a young man became a hotwalker, groom, and racing stable foreman. In 1989 he became the private trainer for the successful Loblolly Stable of Lake Hamilton, Arkansas.

With Loblolly, Tom Bohannan had two horses successfully compete in the U.S. Triple Crown series. In 1992, Pine Bluff finished fifth in the Kentucky Derby, won the Preakness Stakes and was third in the Belmont. The following year Prairie Bayou finished second in the Derby, then gave Tom Bohannan his second consecutive victory in the Preakness. Fatally injured in the Belmont, Prairie Bayou was posthumously voted 1993's U.S. Champion 3-Year-old Colt.

Unfortunately for Bohannan, a year later Loblolly Stable owner John Ed Anthony and his ex-wife disbanded the operation and Bohannan set up a public stable. Beset with personal problems, in the early part of the 2000s (decade) Bohannan left racing for several years but came back in 2006 when he began training again for former Loblolly owner John Ed Anthony who now races under the name Shortleaf Stable. After a difficult year in which they won only four of thirty-five races, in October 2007 Bohannan and John Ed Anthony parted ways.
