= Cox's Ridge =

American-bred Thoroughbred racehorse

- Cox's Ridge's grave at Claiborne Farm
- Sire: Best Turn
- Grandsire: Turn-To
- Dam: Our Martha
- Damsire: Ballydonnell
- Sex: Stallion
- Foaled: 1974
- Country: United States
- Colour: Bay
- Breeder: Samuel D. Hinkel
- Owner: Loblolly Stable
- Trainer: Joseph B. Cantey
- Record: 28: 16-4-4
- Earnings: US$667,172

Major wins
- Governor's Cup Handicap (1977); Minuteman Handicap (1977); Stuyvesant Handicap (1977); Discovery Handicap (1977); Queens County Handicap (1977); Razorback Handicap (1978); Excelsior Handicap (1978); Oaklawn Handicap (1978); Metropolitan Handicap (1978); Tom Fool Handicap (1979)

Cox's Ridge (1974–1998) was an American Thoroughbred racehorse. He bypassed the U.S. Triple Crown series and had considerable success in 1977 and 1978 with his most important win coming in the Metropolitan Handicap. In 1979, the five-year-old Cox's Ridge won the Tom Fool Handicap, ran second in the Whitney Handicap, and finished first in the Philip H. Iselin Stakes but was disqualified for interference and placed second.

Retired to stud, Cox's Ridge was a successful sire whose offspring includes millionaires:

- Life's Magic (b. 1981) - 1984 American Champion Three-Year-Old Filly, 1985 American Champion Older Female Horse, career earnings of $2,255,218
- Little Missouri (b. 1982) - won Brooklyn Handicap, sired 1993 Preakness Stakes winner, Prairie Bayou
- Vanlandingham (b. 1981) - 1985 American Champion Older Male Horse, won G1s Jockey Club Gold Cup, Washington, D.C. International Stakes, Suburban Handicap, retired with career earnings of $1,616,276
- Cardmania (b. 1986), 1993 American Champion Sprint Horse, winner of $1,543,178,
- De Roche (b. 1986) - multiple stakes winner of $1,078,200
- Lost Mountain (b. 1988 ) - won G1 Haskell Invitational Handicap, career earnings of $1,004,939
- Sultry Song (b. 1988) - won Grade 1s Hollywood Gold Cup, Woodward Stakes, career earnings of $1,616,276
