= Loblolly Stable =

Thoroughbred breeding and racing operation

Coordinates: 33.7243°N 92.6171°W

- Type: Thoroughbred Racing Stable & Horse breeding
- Industry: Thoroughbred Horse racing
- Founded: c. 1975; 2000 (Stoneleaf Stable)
- Defunct: 1994 (Loblolly Stable)
- Headquarters: Lake Hamilton, Arkansas
- Key people: John Ed & Mary Lynn Anthony, owners

Loblolly Stable was a Thoroughbred horse breeding and racing stable in Lake Hamilton, Arkansas owned by businessman John Ed Anthony and his former wife Mary Lynn. The stable's first top runner was Cox's Ridge who won important races in 1977 and 1978 and went on to become an excellent sire. Loblolly Stable had back-to-back wins in the Preakness Stakes in 1992 and 1993 with Pine Bluff and Prairie Bayou respectively and also won the 1980 Belmont Stakes with Temperence Hill.

Having dissolved their marriage, in 1994 the owners agreed to wind up the stable operation and began selling off some of its mares and yearlings at the Keeneland Sales.

Eclipse Award winners:

- Temperence Hill - American Champion Three-Year-Old Male Horse (1980)
- Vanlandingham - U.S. Champion Older Male Horse (1985)
- Prairie Bayou - U.S. Champion 3-Year-old Colt (1993)

Other Grade I winners include Little Missouri, Demons Begone, De Roche, and Lost Mountain.

A native of Bearden, Arkansas, in 2001 John Ed Anthony was inducted in the Arkansas Sports Hall of Fame.

== Shortleaf Stable ==
Loblolly Stable's successor was John Ed Anthony's Shortleaf Stable named after a horse that won two races in 2005. Revived in 2000 Shortleaf Stable began to reorganize itself in earnest in 2010 with the assistance of his son Edward Anthony.

In 2018 Plainsmen won the GIII Discovery Stakes at Aqueduct Racetrack, the first stakes win since 1997.
