= Prioress Stakes =

- Class: Grade III
- Location: Saratoga Race Course; Saratoga Springs, New York, United States
- Inaugurated: 1948
- Race type: Thoroughbred – Flat racing
- Website: www.nyra.com

Race information
- Distance: 6 furlong sprint
- Surface: Dirt
- Track: left-handed
- Qualification: Three-year-old fillies
- Weight: Assigned
- Purse: US$200,000 (2024)

The Prioress Stakes is an American Grade III Thoroughbred horse race held annually during the eight-week meet at Saratoga Race Course in Saratoga Springs, New York.

Inaugurated in 1948 at Jamaica Racetrack, it was raced there through 1959 after which it was hosted by Aqueduct Racetrack through 1986. It was run at Belmont Park from 1987 through 2011 before being moved to Saratoga Race Course in 2012, where it remains on the stakes schedule. The Prioress was named for the filly Prioress, out of the great mare Reel, herself by Glencoe. In 1858, Prioress became the first American Thoroughbred ever to win in England.

The Prioress Stakes was run in two divisions in 1951 and again in 1958.

This race was downgraded to a Grade II for its 2014 running.

== Records ==
Speed record:

- 1:08.26 – Xtra Heat (2001)

Most wins by a jockey:

- 4 – John Velazquez (1994, 1996, 2002, 2008)

Most wins by a trainer:

- 3 – Bob Baffert (2004, 2008, 2018)

Most wins by an owner:

- 3 – Happy Valley Farm (1970, 1986, 1988)

== Winners ==
Year	Winner	Jockey	Trainer	Owner	Time
2026	Mashallah	Manuel Franco	Brendan P. Walsh	JR Ranch	1:09.93
2025	Praying	Eric Cancel	Robert Medina	Newtown Anner Stud Farm	1.10.10
2024	Brightwork	Luis Saez	John Alexander Ortiz	WSS Racing	1:10.86
2023	Alva Starr	Jose Lezcano	Brett A. Brinkman	P. Dale Ladner	1:09.14
2022	Wicked Halo	Tyler Gaffalione	Steve Asmussen	Winchell Thoroughbreds	1:10.16
2021	Cilla	Tyler Gaffalione	Charlton Baker	P. Dale Ladner	1:10.05
2020	Frank's Rockette	Junior Alvarado	William I. Mott	Frank Fletcher Racing Operations Inc	1:08.89
2019	Royal Charlotte	Javier Castellano	Chad Brown	First Row Partners & Parkland Thoroughbreds	1:09.45
2018	Dream Tree	Mike E. Smith	Bob Baffert	Phoenix Thoroughbred III	1:09.50
2017	Vertical Oak	John R. Velazquez	Steve Asmussen	J. Kirk and Judy Robinson	1:10.00
2016	Lucy N Ethel	Jose Lezcano	Chloe Bradley	J A G Racing/Jettany Thoroughbred	1:09.33
2015	Cavorting	Irad Ortiz Jr.	Kiaran McLaughlin	Stonestreet Stables	1:09.47
2014	Stonetastic	Paco Lopez	Kelly J. Breen	Stoneway Farm	1:08.88
2013	Lighthouse Bay	Joseph Rocco Jr.	George Weaver	Richlyn Farm, Inc.	1:09.29
2012	Emma's Encore	Joel Rosario	Wesley A. Ward	Wesley A. Ward	1:09.35
2011	Her Smile	Javier Castellano	Todd Pletcher	Bobby Flay	1:09.44
2010	Franny Freud	Garrett Gomez	John Terranova II	Paul P. Pompa Jr.	1:10.11
2009	Cat Moves	Ramon Domínguez	Anthony Dutrow	Edward P. Evans	1:08.65
2008	Indian Blessing	John Velazquez	Bob Baffert	Patti & Hal J. Earnhardt III	1:09.36
2007	Dream Rush	Eibar Coa	Richard Violette Jr.	West Point Stable, et al.	1:09.02
2006	Wildcat Bettie B	Michael Pino	J. Larry Jones	Oasis Racing	1:09.18
2005	Acey Deucey	Diane Nelson	John D. Morrison	Jeffrey Tucker	1:10.37
2004	Friendly Michelle	Corey Nakatani	Bob Baffert	Ed Friendly	1:09.09
2003	House Party	José A. Santos	H. Allen Jerkens	Joseph V. Shields Jr.	1:09.45
2002	Carson Hollow	John Velazquez	Richard E. Dutrow Jr.	Hemlock Hills Farm et al.	1:08.79
2001	Xtra Heat	Rick Wilson	John Salzman Sr.	Kenneth Taylor	1:08.26
2000	I'm Brassy	Mike Luzzi	Kristina Dupps	Iron Lance Stables	1:09.53
1999	Sapphire n' Silk	Pat Day	Dallas Stewart	William A. Carl	1:09.40
1998	Hurricane Bertie	Pat Day	Bernard S. Flint	Bertram W. Klein	1:08.80
1997	Pearl City	Jerry Bailey	D. Wayne Lukas	Overbrook Farm	1:09.40
1996	Capote Belle	John Velazquez	Daniel Pietz	Lawana & Robert Low	1:08.81
1995	Scotzanna	Robin Platts	Michael W. Wright	Bruno Schickedanz	1:10.61
1994	Penny's Reshoot	John Velazquez	John DeStefano Jr.	Edwin H. Wachtel	1:09.07
1993	Classy Mirage	Julie Krone	H. Allen Jerkens	Middletown Stables	1:08.89
1992	American Royale	José A. Santos	Lisa L. Lewis	William S. Farish III	1:09.36
1991	Zama Hummer	Gary Stevens	Jerry Dutton	Tim K. Roe	1:09 .88
1990	Token Dance	Eddie Maple	Patrick J. Kelly	Fox Ridge Farm	1:09.40
1989	Safely Kept	Ángel Cordero Jr.	Alan E. Goldberg	Barry Weisbord	1:11.60
1988	Fara's Team	Jerry Bailey	Richard Dutrow Sr.	Happy Valley Farm	1:10.20
1987	Firey Challenge	Richard Migliore	Anthony W. Dutrow	Mary Wootten	1:10.60
1986	Religiosity	José A. Santos	Richard Dutrow Sr.	Happy Valley Farm	1:11.00
1985	Clocks Secret	John Nied Jr.	Dennis Heimer	Stanley I. Joselson	1:10.00
1984	Proud Clarioness	Jean-Luc Samyn	Philip G. Johnson	Lou Roe Stable	1:10.40
1983	Able Money	Antonio Graell	Anthony B. Russo	Faith Donnelly	1:11.00
1982	Trove	Michael Venezia	Woody Stephens	Hickory Tree Stable	1:10.00
1981	Tina Tina Too	Cash Asmussen	Richard T. DeStasio	Albert Fried Jr.	1:11.20
1980	Lien	Eddie Maple	Patrick J. Kelly	Live Oak Racing	1:11.00
1979	Fall Aspen	Roger Velez	James E. Picou	Joseph M. Roebling	1:12.00
1978	Tempest Queen	Jorge Velásquez	Lou Rondinello	Darby Dan Farm	1:11.40
1977	Ring O'Bells	Ángel Cordero Jr.	Woodrow Sedlacek	Jacques D. Wimpfheimer	1:10.40
1976	Dearly Precious	Braulio Baeza	Stephen A. DiMauro	Richard E. Bailey	1:09.80
1975	Sarsar	Bill Shoemaker	David A. Whiteley	William Haggin Perry	1:10.80
1974	Clear Copy	Daryl Montoya	Jerome Hirsch	Leon J. Hekimian	1:10.20
1973	Windy's Daughter	Braulio Baeza	Laz Barrera	Mrs. Paul Blackman	1:10.20
1972	Numbered Account	Braulio Baeza	Roger Laurin	Ogden Phipps	1:10.00
1971	Miss Plumage	Robert Woodhouse	Philip J. Horn Jr.	David Shaer	1:11.60
1970	Exclusive Dancer	Chuck Baltazar	John T. Davis	Happy Valley Farm	1:11.60
1969	Ta Wee	John L. Rotz	John A. Nerud	Tartan Farms	1:09.40
1968	Dark Mirage	Ángel Cordero Jr.	Everett W. King	Lloyd Miller	1:10.80
1967	Just Kidding	Eddie Belmonte	J. Elliott Burch	Rokeby Stable	1:10.60
1966	My Boss Lady †	Bill Shoemaker	Edward A. Neloy	Ogden Phipps	1:10.60
1965	What a Treat	John L. Rotz	Sylvester Veitch	George D. Widener Jr.	1:10.40
1964	Nilene Wonder	Donald Pierce	A. W. Beuzeville	Verna Lea Farm	1:12.20
1963	Speedwell	Bill Shoemaker	Casey Hayes	Meadow Stable	1:10.60
1962	Some Song	Johnny Sellers	Edward J. Yowell	Mrs. Benjamin Cohen	1:11.00
1961	Primonetta	Bill Hartack	James P. Conway	Darby Dan Farm	1:10.60
1960	Salt Lake	Ralph Yaka	Casey Hayes	Meadow Stable	1:11.80
1959	Miss Royal	Bobby Ussery	Joe Kulina	John Fieramosca	1:11.60
1958	Milady Dares	Arthur Chambers	James J. Rowan	Mrs. Walter A. Edgar	1:12.80
1958	Dixie Miss	John Ruane	Willie Booth	Isaac J. Collins	1:13.40
1957	I Offbeat	Hedley Woodhouse	Edward I. Kelly Sr.	Brookfield Farm	1:12.00
1956	Royal Lark	Walter Blum	Ike K. Mourar	Maine Chance Farm	1:12.40
1955	Sometime Thing	Eric Guerin	William C. Winfrey	Alfred G. Vanderbilt II	1:12.20
1954	Trisong	Hedley Woodhouse	Edwin Holton	Edwin Holton	1:12.40
1953	Grecian Queen	Eric Guerin	James P. Conway	Florence Whitaker	1:13.40
1952	Landmark	Dave Gorman	Robert L. Dotter	James Cox Brady Jr.	1:12.20
1951	Ruddy	Ted Atkinson	John M. Gaver Sr.	Greentree Stable	1:12.60
1951	Tilly Rose	William Boland	Max Hirsch	King Ranch	1:11.40
1950	Next Move	Eric Guerin	William C. Winfrey	Alfred G. Vanderbilt II	1:13.40
1949	Nell K.	Douglas Dodson	John B. Partridge	Spring Hill Farm	1:13.40
1948	Itsabet	Robert Permane	Dan W. Kerns	Brookfield Farm	1:12.20

* † In 1966, Priceless Gem finished first but was disqualified and set back to last.
