= Salvator Mile Stakes =

- Class: Grade III
- Location: Monmouth Park Racetrack; Oceanport, New Jersey, United States
- Inaugurated: 1948
- Race type: Thoroughbred – Flat racing
- Website: www1.monmouthpark.com/index.asp

Race information
- Distance: 1 mile (8 furlongs)
- Surface: Dirt
- Track: left-handed
- Qualification: Three-year-olds & up
- Weight: Assigned
- Purse: US$155,000 (2023)

The Salvator Mile Stakes (formerly the Salvator Mile Handicap) is an American Thoroughbred horse race held annually in June or July at Monmouth Park Racetrack in Oceanport, New Jersey. Open to horses age three and older, it is contested on dirt at a distance of one mile (8 furlongs). A Grade III event, it currently offers a purse of $155,000. This race is named for U.S. Racing Hall of Fame inductee, Salvator.

The Salvator Mile (G3) is the lead off leg of the Mid Atlantic Thoroughbred Championships Long Dirt Division or MATCh Races. MATCh is a series of five races in five separate thoroughbred divisions run throughout four Mid-Atlantic States including; Pimlico Race Course and Laurel Park Racecourse in Maryland; Delaware Park Racetrack in Delaware; Parx, Philadelphia Park and Presque Isle Downs in Pennsylvania and Monmouth Park in New Jersey.

== Records ==
Speed record:

- 1:34.25 – Gottcha Gold (2007)

Most wins:

- 2 – Peanut Butter Onit (1991, 1992)
- 2 – Sea of Tranquility (2001, 2002)

Most wins by a jockey:

- 4 – Bill Hartack (1954, 1959, 1960, 1970)

Most wins by a trainer:

- 3 – Frank Y. Whiteley Jr. (1966, 1970, 1974)
- 3 – Todd Pletcher (2006, 2022, 2024)

Most wins by an owner:

- 2 – Brookfield Farm (1949, 1964)
- 2 – Jaclyn Stable (1954, 1959)
- 2 – Keystone Stable (1969, 1977)
- 2 – Elaine J. Meltzer (1991, 1992)
- 2 – Triple M Farm, Inc. (2001, 2002)

== Winners ==
Year	Winner	Age	Jockey	Trainer	Owner	Time<be>
2026	East Avenue	4	Tyler Gaffalione	Brendan P. Walsh	Godolphin	1:35.99
2025	Bishops Bay	5	Flavien Prat	Brad H. Cox	Spendthrift Farm	1:37.16
2024	Bright Future	5	Javier Castellano	Todd Pletcher	Repole Stable	1:36.96
2023	Petulante	4	Luis Saez	Victor Barbosa Jr.	Lugamo Racing Stable	1:36.88
2022	Mind Control	6	John Velazquez	Todd Pletcher	Red Oak Stable & Madaket Stables	1:35.79
2021	Informative	5	José C. Ferrer	Uriah St. Lewis	Uriah St. Lewis	1:37.01
2020	Pirate's Punch	5	Jorge A. Vargas Jr.	Grant T. Forster	Gulliver Racing LLC, Craig W. Drager, & Dan Legan	1:37.19
2019	Sunny Ridge	6	Jose Lezcano	Jason Servis	Dennis A. Drazin	1:37.17
2018	Page Mckenney	8	Horacio Karamanos	Mary E. Eppler	Staple, Adam and Jalin Stable	1:36.49
2017	Classy Class	5	Antonio Gallardo	Kiaran McLaughlin	Cheyenne Stables LLC	1:35.27
2016	Res Judicata	6	Nik Juarez	John Servis	Someday Farm (Roy & Patricia Chapman)	1:36.07
2015	Bradester	5	Corey J. Lanerie	Eddie Kenneally	Joseph W. Sutton	1:35.32
2014	Itsmyluckyday	4	Paco Lopez	Edward Plesa Jr.	Trilogy Stable/Plesa	1:34.88
2013	Raging Daoust	4	Victor Santiago	Charles J. Carlesimo Jr.	Costabile/Juliano	1:36.96
2012	Race not held					
2011	Kensei	5	Edgar Prado	Steve Asmussen	Stonestreet Stables	1:36:83
2010	Gone Astray	4	Cornelio Velásquez	Shug McGaughey	Phipps Stable	1:38.02
2009	Coal Play	4	Joe Bravo	Nick Zito	Robert LaPenta	1:34.54
2008	Notional	4	Joe Bravo	Douglas F. O'Neill	J. Paul Reddam	1:35.84
2007	Gottcha Gold	4	Chuck Lopez	Edward Plesa Jr.	Centaur Farms Inc.	1:34.25
2006	Flower Alley	4	John Velazquez	Todd A. Pletcher	Eugene Melnyk	1:35.87
2005	Cherokee's Boy	5	Aaron Gryder	Gary Capuano	Z W P Stable Inc.	1:36.79
2004	Presidentialaffair	5	Stewart Elliott	Martin E. Ciresa	V. Papandrea/E. Ciresa	1:35.20
2003	Vinemeister	4	José Vélez Jr.	Alan Seewald	Travin Stables	1:35.80
2002	Sea of Tranquility †	6	José C. Ferrer	Richard E. Paulus	Triple M Farm, Inc.	1:36.00
2001	Sea of Tranquility	5	José C. Ferrer	Richard E. Paulus	Triple M Farm, Inc.	1:36.60
2000	Leave It to Beezer	7	Roberto Alvarado Jr.	Scott A. Lake	Leo Gaspari Racing	1:37.20
1999	Truluck	4	Joe Bravo	W. Elliott Walden	Stonerside Stable	1:36.00
1998	El Amante	5	Julie Krone	William I. Mott	Diane Snowden & David Strauss	1:34.80
1997	Distorted Humor	4	Julie Krone	W. Elliott Walden	Prestonwood Farm	1:36.00
1996	Smart Strike	4	Sandy Hawley	Mark Frostad	Sam-Son Farm	1:36.20
1995	Schossberg	5	Dave Penna	Phil England	Steve Stavros	1:35.80
1994	Storm Tower	4	Rick Wilson	Ben Perkins Jr.	Char-Mari Stable	1:36.20
1993	Dusty Screen	5	Eddie King Jr.	John Pregman Jr.	Daniel J. Ljoka	1:35.80
1992	Peanut Butter Onit	6	Aaron Gryder	Frank Lange	Elaine J. Meltzer	1:36.20
1991	Peanut Butter Onit	5	Wigberto Ramos	John H. Forbes	Elaine J. Meltzer	1:34.40
1990	Shy Tom	4	Julie Krone	D. Wayne Lukas	William T. Young	1:36.00
1989	Bill E. Shears	4	Ruben Hernandez	Sonny Hine	Savin & Waltuch	1:35.40
1988	Slew City Slew	4	Marco Castaneda	D. Wayne Lukas	H. J. Allen & Tayhill Stable	1:35.00
1987	Moment of Hope	4	Mike Venezia	Bob G. Dunham	Four Fifths Stable	1:34.60
1986	Jyp	5	Joe Rocco	John J. Tammaro III	Diamond Ten	1:35.80
1985	Valiant Lark	5	Vince Bracciale Jr.	Henry L. Carroll	Dee Jo Stable	1:36.00
1984	Rumptious	4	Herb McCauley	Daniel Dufford	Low Meadows	1:34.60
1983	Naughty Jimmy	6	Larry Samuell	Richard Delp	Quality Hill Stable	1:37.00
1982	Count His Fleet	4	William Nemeti	John J. Tammaro III	John D. Marsh	1:35.60
1981	Colonel Moran	4	Craig Perret	Thomas J. Kelly	Townsend B. Martin	1:35.60
1980	Convenient	4	Vince Bracciale Jr.	Edwin K. Cleveland Jr.	Dravo Foley	1:36.60
1979	Revivalist †	5	Don MacBeth	Virgil W. Raines	Greentree Stable	1:35.40
1978	Do Tell George	5	William Mize	Lafe Carmine	Betty L. Davis	1:36.40
1977	Peppy Addy	5	Billy Phelps	George Zateslo	Keystone Stable	1:36.00
1976	Royal Glint	6	Jorge Tejeira	Gordon R. Potter	Dan Lasater	1:35.20
1975	Mongongo	6	Buck Thornburg	Daniel Perlsweig	S.K.S. Stable	1:36.20
1975	Proper Bostonian	5	Mike Miceli	George Handy	Edward Burke & Irving Saunders	1:36.20
1974	Okavango	4	Walter Blum	Frank Y. Whiteley Jr.	William Haggin Perry	1:35.80
1973	Prince of Truth	5	Walter Blum	Lawrence Jennings	Lucky Irish Stable	1:35.80
1972	Red Reality	6	Braulio Baeza	MacKenzie Miller	Cragwood Stables	1:37.00
1971	Well Mannered	4	Mickey Solomone	Anthony L. Basile	Bwamazon Farm	1:38.80
1970	Tyrant	4	Bill Hartack	Frank Y. Whiteley Jr.	Locust Hill Farm	1:37.40
1969	Addy Boy	4	Michael Hole	George Zateslo	Keystone Stable	1:37.40
1968	R. Thomas	7	Jimmy Nichols	David Erb	Roger W. Wilson	1:37.00
1967	Swoonaway	6	Jacinto Vásquez	S. Bryant Ott	E. Gay Drake	1:37.80
1966	Tom Rolfe	4	Bill Shoemaker	Frank Y. Whiteley Jr.	Powhatan Stable	1:37.00
1965	Twice as Gay	4	Phil Grimm	Douglas R. Small	Nathan L. Cohen	1:38.80
1964	Inbalance	6	Joe Culmone	Edward I. Kelly Sr.	Brookfield Farm	1:37.00
1963	Dedimoud	4	Joe Culmone	Eddie Yowell	Bruce S. Campbell	1:36.80
1962	Towson	4	Danny French	B. Frank Christmas	Mary G. Christmas	1:40.20
1961	Careless John	4	William Boland	Howard Hoffman	Louis Lee Haggin II	1:35.00
1960	I'm Willing	4	Bill Hartack	Eugene Jacobs	Perne L. Grissom	1:37.00
1959	Li'l Fella	4	Bill Hartack	J. Bowes Bond	Jaclyn Stable	1:37.20
1958	Sonny Dan	4	Walter Blum	George E. Roberts	Victory Stable	1:37.20
1957	Nahodah	4	Joe Culmone	Frank A. Bonsal	Montpelier Stable	1:34.60
1956	Skipper Bill	6	Joseph Regalbuto	Jack Long	Darby Dan Farm	1:37.00
1955	Helioscope	4	Sam Boulmetis Sr.	Howard Hausner	William G. Helis Jr.	1:36.80
1954	Closed Door	5	Bill Hartack	Sidney Jacobs	Jaclyn Stable	1:37.00
1953	Tuscany	5	James Stout	J. Bowes Bond	Mrs. Samuel M. Pistorio	1:37.40
1952	General Staff	4	James Stout	Jimmy McGee	Larry MacPhail	1:39.20
1951	Call Over	4	Mel Peterson	Eddie Yowell	Bedford Stable	1:38.80
1950	Noble Impulse	4	Willie Downs	Frank Gall	Justin Funkhouser	1:39.00
1949	Istan	4	Henry Mora	D. W. Kerns	Brookfield Farm	1:37.60
1948	Vertigo II	7	Arnold Kirkland	J. Frank Laboyne	Marlet Stable	1:39.00

- † In 2002, First Lieutenant finished first but was disqualified and set back to third.
- † In 1979, Nice Catch finished first but was disqualified and set back to third.
