= Edward J. Yowell =

Eddie Yowell
Personal information
- Born: May 14, 1915 Nazareth, Pennsylvania, U.S.
- Died: October 29, 1991 (aged 76)
- Occupation: Trainer

Horse racing career
- Sport: Horse racing
- Career wins: not found

Major racing wins
- Rowe Memorial Handicap (1951); Salvator Mile Handicap (1951, 1963); Marguerite Stakes (1958); Bay Shore Handicap (1961); Carter Handicap (1962); Gravesend Handicap (1962, 1968); Prioress Stakes (1962); Rumson Stakes (1963, 1968, 1969); Toboggan Handicap (1962, 1968); Sport Page Handicap (1963); Jersey Derby (1965); Travers Stakes (1965); Cowdin Stakes (1967); Tyro Stakes (1967); Flash Stakes (1968); Jerome Handicap (1968); Royal Palm Handicap (1968); Westchester Handicap (1969); New Jersey Futurity (1970); Sanford Stakes (1970); Flamingo Stakes (1971); Woodlawn Stakes (1971); Gulfstream Park Handicap (1972); Metropolitan Handicap (1972); Saratoga Special Stakes (1974); Maskette Stakes (1975) American Classics wins: Belmont Stakes (1965, 1971)

Racing awards
- Leading trainer at Monmouth Park (1960, 1967)

Significant horses
- Merry Ruler, Hail To All, Iron Ruler; Pass Catcher, Executioner

Edward J. Yowell (May 14, 1915 – October 29, 1991) was an American Thoroughbred horse racing trainer. Widely respected in the industry, his obituary in the Ocala Star-Banner was titled "Yowell leaves behind legacy of integrity."

A native of Pennsylvania, Eddie Yowell began his career in Thoroughbred racing in 1933 as a jockey. Following a successful career in which he was a leading jockey at New York's Empire City Race Track, he remained in the industry as a trainer. In 1951, at Monmouth Park Racetrack in Oceanport, New Jersey where he would become a two-time leading trainer, he notably won the first of his two Salvator Mile Handicaps with Call Over, his best runner to that time. Yowell's second Salvator Mile win came in 1963 during his best decade in racing. Yowell also had considerable success with Executioner whose wins included the Grade I Metropolitan Handicap.

== Triple Crown wins ==
In 1964, Eddie Yowell trained the colt Hail To All for owner Zelda Cohen, the wife of Ben Cohen, co-owner and Secretary-Treasurer of Pimlico Race Course. At age three, Hail To All won the 1965 Jersey Derby, Travers Stakes. He ran fifth in the Kentucky Derby, third in the Preakness Stakes, and gave Yowell his first U.S. Triple Crown win in the Belmont Stakes. In 1971, Eddie Yowell earned his second Belmont Stakes win with Pass Catcher.

Among the other notable horses Eddie Yowell trained was Merry Ruler, a multiple stakes winner in the early 1960s who equaled the Aqueduct track record in winning the Carter Handicap in May 1962 then in July set a new Aqueduct track record while winning the Gravesend Handicap.

=== Oak Crest Farm ===
A pioneer for what has become a major industry in Marion County, Florida, in the 1960s Eddie Yowell and Maryland horseman Arnold Wilcox established an 800-acre (3.2 km^{2}) breeding and training facility at Ocala, Florida. They named it Oak Crest Farm and raced horses under the banner of Oak Crest Stable. A substantial operation, in addition to living quarters, barns and sheds, the partners built a one-mile (1.6 km) training track that remains the property's centerpiece to this day.

Through various owners over the years, the Ocala farm has been the breaking and training ground for ten Champions and two winners of American Horse of the Year honors. Yowell and Wilcox sold the property in 1977 to Robert Murty and his brothers who in 1983 sold half of the acreage, including the training track, to Dr. Jim and Sally Hill and their partners, Mickey and Karen Taylor. They raced under the name, Equusequity Stable. The Taylors are best known as the owners of U.S. Triple Crown winner, Seattle Slew. In 1992 the property became part of Allen Paulson's Brookside Farms operations. He sold it in April 2000 to Roy S. Lerman who renamed it Lambholm South. On July 14, 2006, Lerman sold the property to Ohio businessman Larry Roberts who uses it as an American Quarter Horse breeding and training operation.

Health problems forced Eddie Yowell to retire in the summer of 1991. He died a few months later on October 29 from cancer.
