= Bay Shore Stakes =

- Class: Listed
- Location: Aqueduct Racetrack; Queens, New York, United States
- Inaugurated: 1960 (as Bay Shore Handicap)
- Race type: Thoroughbred – Flat racing
- Website: NYRA

Race information
- Distance: 7 furlongs
- Surface: Dirt
- Track: left-handed
- Qualification: Three-year-olds
- Weight: 123 lbs. with allowances
- Purse: $150,000 (since 2021)

The Bay Shore Stakes is a Listed American Thoroughbred horse race for three-year-olds at a distance of seven furlongs on the dirt run annually in early April at Aqueduct Racetrack in Ozone Park, Queens, New York. The event currently offers a purse of $150,000.

== History ==
The event was named for the resort town of Bay Shore, New York.

The name was once an event with the same name, Bay Shore Handicap, which was for three-year-olds and older and held in September. That event ended in 1955 with the closing of the old Aqueduct track. The track was closed until it was reconstructed in 1959. According to New York Racing Association the new event was inaugurated on 13 April 1960 as a race with an old name – Bay Shore Handicap for three-year-olds at a distance of one mile. The following year the name of the event was changed to the Bay Shore Stakes.

In 1964 the distance of the event was decreased to seven furlongs. The event began impacting the paths the three year old would take towards the U.S Triple Crown. In 1967, the winner Damascus continued his outstanding form winning the Preakness Stakes and Belmont Stakes and capturing a host of awards including U.S. Champion three-year-old colt, US Champion Handicap Horse and becoming US Horse of the Year. In 1968 Reviewer carried a record 130 pounds to victory in the first division of the event which was split. The 1970 US Champion Two-Year-Old Colt, Hoist The Flag won this event in 1971 with a new track record of 1:21 flat in what would be his last start as a career ending training incident forced a premature retirement.

In 1973 the first year the classification system was enacted, the event was set with Grade III status. Arguably, the most famous horse to have won this event was the 1973 winner Secretariat who won the race after an objection claim by 4 1/2 lengths, later that year becoming the U.S Triple Crown champion - the first after 25 years. In 1976 Bold Forbes set a new stakes record for the event in 1:20 4/5. Two starts later Bold Forbes would win the Kentucky Derby and be crowned the U.S. Champion three-year-old colt.

The event has been run at a shorter distance of 6 furlongs in 1977, 1978 and 1984 and on the inter track in 1994.

The race has been run in split divisions in 1962, 1968, 1975, and 1986.

The event was scheduled for 13 March 1993 but postponed twice due to bad weather before finally being cancelled. In 2020 due to the COVID-19 pandemic in the United States, Aqueduct closed their track and the event was cancelled.

In 2024 the event was downgraded by the Thoroughbred Owners and Breeders Association to Listed status.

== Records ==
Speed record:

- 7 furlongs – 1:20.54 Limit Out (1998)

Margins:

- 10 1/2 lengths - Houston (1989)

Most wins by a jockey:

- 5 – John Velazquez (1994, 1996, 2003, 2004, 2019)

Most wins by a trainer:

- 4 – Chad C. Brown (2014, 2015, 2017, 2024)

Most wins by an owner:

- 3 – Robert B. Cohen (1974, 1988, 1991)

== Winners ==
Year	Winner	Jockey	Trainer	Owner	Distance	Time	Purse	Grade	Ref
Bay Shore Stakes
2026	Solitude Dude	Javier Castellano	Joseph Saffie Jr.	Chris Fountoukis	7 furlongs	1:23.00	$139,500	Listed	
2025	Mo Plex	Manuel Franco	Jeremiah C. Englehart	R and H Stable	7 furlongs	1:21.96	$145,500	Listed	
2024	Reasoned Analysis	Eric Cancel	Chad C. Brown	Klaravich Stables	7 furlongs	1:24.35	$150,000	Listed	
2023	Joey Freshwater	Kendrick Carmouche	Linda Rice	Winning Move Stable	7 furlongs	1:24.91	$200,000	III	
2022	Wit	José Ortiz	Todd A. Pletcher	Repole Stable, St. Elias Stable, & Gainesway Farm	7 furlongs	1:23.27	$200,000	III	
2021	Drain the Clock	Irad Ortiz Jr.	Joseph Saffie Jr.	Slam Dunk Racing, Madaket Stables, Wonder Stables & Michael Nentwig	7 furlongs	1:25.97	$194,000	III	
2020	Race not held								
2019	Mind Control	John R. Velazquez	Gregory D. Sacco	Red Oak Stable & Madaket Stables	7 furlongs	1:23.45	$232,500	III	
2018	National Flag	Flavien Prat	Todd A. Pletcher	WinStar Farm, China Horse Club & SF Racing	7 furlongs	1:23.16	$250,000	III	
2017	Long Haul Bay	Manuel Franco	Chad C. Brown	Alpha Delta Stables	7 furlongs	1:24.14	$250,000	III	
2016	Unified	Jose L. Ortiz	James A. Jerkens	Centennial Farms	7 furlongs	1:22.86	$300,000	III	
2015	March	Irad Ortiz Jr.	Chad C. Brown	Robert V. LaPenta	7 furlongs	1:24.72	$300,000	III	
2014	Coup de Grace	Javier Castellano	Chad C. Brown	Fox Hill Farms	7 furlongs	1:23.19	$300,000	III	
2013	Declan's Warrior	Jose Lezcano	Nicholas P. Zito	Lucky Shamrock Stable	7 furlongs	1:22.09	$250,000	III	
2012	Trinniberg	Willie Martinez	Bisnath Parboo	Shivananda Racing	7 furlongs	1:23.46	$250,000	III	
2011	J J's Lucky Train	Jose C. Ferrer	William D. Anderson	Fresh Start Stable	7 furlongs	1:22.54	$200,000	III	
2010	Eightyfiveinafifty	Ramon A. Dominguez	Gary C. Contessa	Harold Lerner, John L. Moirano, Team Stallion, Gary Contessa, Dale Cohen & McConnell Racing	7 furlongs	1:21.89	$196,000	III	
2009	Capt. Candyman Can	Javier Castellano	Ian R. Wilkes	Joseph Rauch & David Zell	7 furlongs	1:22.99	$200,000	III	
2008	J Be K	Garrett K. Gomez	Steven M. Asmussen	Zayat Stables	7 furlongs	1:23.67	$150,000	III	
2007	Bill Place	Cornelio Velasquez	Anthony W. Dutrow	Michael Dubb, Sanford J. Goldfarb & Cast of Characters	7 furlongs	1:22.99	$150,000	III	
2006	Too Much Bling	Garrett K. Gomez	Bob Baffert	Stonerside Stable & Blazing Meadows Farm	7 furlongs	1:22.40	$147,000	III	
2005	Lost in the Fog	Russell Baze	Greg Gilchrist	Harry J. Aleo	7 furlongs	1:21.33	$150,000	III	
2004	Forest Danger	John R. Velazquez	Todd A. Pletcher	Aaron U. & Marie D. Jones	7 furlongs	1:20.67	$150,000	III	
2003	Halo Homewrecker	John R. Velazquez	Mark A. Hennig	Edward P. Evans	7 furlongs	1:23.19	$150,000	III	
2002	Roman Dancer	Kent J. Desormeaux	Christopher S. Paasch	Lorraine & Rod Rodriguez	7 furlongs	1:22.21	$150,000	III	
2001	Skip to the Stone	Victor Espinoza	Mike R. Mitchell	Greystone Stable & Vincenzo Loverso	7 furlongs	1:22.46	$150,000	III	
2000	Precise End	Jorge F. Chavez	Mark E. Casse	Harry T. Mangurian Jr.	7 furlongs	1:22.27	$110,000	III	
1999	Perfect Score	Edgar S. Prado	Bud Delp	Harry & Tom Meyerhoff	7 furlongs	1:22.98	$110,200	III	
1998	Limit Out	Jean-Luc Samyn	H. Allen Jerkens	Joseph V. Shields Jr.	7 furlongs	1:20.54	$109,100	III	
1997	Hawks Landing	Richard Migliore	Roy Sedlacek	Blue Stork Stable	7 furlongs	1:22.13	$110,800	III	
1996	Jamies First Punch	John R. Velazquez	Robert Barbara	Zimpom Stable	7 furlongs	1:22.13	$112,000	III	
1995	Blissful State	Michael J. Luzzi	John C. Kimmel	Lucille Conover	7 furlongs	1:23.92	$107,800	III	
†1994	Prank Call	John R. Velazquez	Robert Barbara	Sabine Stable	6 furlongs	1:09.84	$109,900	III	
1993	Race not held								
1992	Three Peat	Chris Antley	John W. Sadler	Gary Biszantz	7 furlongs	1:21.68	$126,000	II	
1991	Stately Wager	Jorge F. Chavez	Stanley R. Shapoff	Robert B. Cohen	7 furlongs	1:23.80	$118,400	II	
1990	Richard R.	Jose A. Santos	D. Wayne Lukas	Sugar Maple Farm	7 furlongs	1:22.80	$116,800	II	
1989	Houston	Laffit Pincay Jr.	D. Wayne Lukas	Lloyd R. French Jr.	7 furlongs	1:22.40	$115,000	II	
1988	Perfect Spy (CAN)	Robbie Davis	Stanley R. Shapoff	Robert B. Cohen	7 furlongs	1:22.60	$164,100	II	
1987	Gulch	Jose A. Santos	LeRoy Jolley	Peter M. Brant	7 furlongs	1:23.20	$163,000	II	
1986	Zabaleta	Darrel G. McHargue	John Gosden	Our Life Stable	7 furlongs	1:23.80	$167,750	II	Division 1
1986	Buck Aly	Nick Santagata	Bruce Johnstone	Michael D. Riordan	7 furlongs	1:22.00	$158,750	II	Division 2
1985	Pancho Villa	Frank Lovato Jr.	D. Wayne Lukas	Lloyd R. French Jr.	7 furlongs	1:22.20	$139,200	II	
1984	Secret Prince	Craig Perret	William V. Terrill	Elaine M. Brodsky	6 furlongs	1:11.20	$136,800	III	
1983	Strike Gold	Eddie Maple	William H. Turner Jr.	Welcome Farm	7 furlongs	1:22.60	$57,700	III	
1982	Shimatoree	Angel Cordero Jr.	Richard E. Dutrow Sr.	Dr. Rifat Hussain	7 furlongs	1:23.20	$55,000	III	
1981	Proud Appeal	Jeffrey Fell	Stanley M. Hough	Malcolm H. Winfield	7 furlongs	1:22.20	$54,900	III	
Bay Shore Handicap
1980	Colonel Moran	Jorge Velasquez	Thomas J. Kelly	Townsend B. Martin	7 furlongs	1:23.80	$57,100	III	
1979	Belle's Gold	George Martens	Walter A. Kelley	John R. Murrell	7 furlongs	1:21.80	$53,400	III	
Bay Shore Stakes
1978	Piece of Heaven	Ruben Hernandez	Frank Martin Sr.	Sigmund Sommer	6 furlongs	1:11.00	$54,100	III	
1977	Cormorant	Danny Wright	James P. Simpson	Charles Berry Jr.	6 furlongs	1:10.80	$54,100	III	
1976	Bold Forbes	Angel Cordero Jr.	Laz Barrera	E. Rodriguez Tizol	7 furlongs	1:20.80	$56,300	III	
1975	Laramie Trail	Mike Venezia	Jose A. Martin	Joseph M. Roebling	7 furlongs	1:23.60	$44,950	III	Division 1
1975	Lefty	Ron Turcotte	Lucien Laurin	Meadow Stable	7 furlongs	1:23.80	$45,650	III	Division 2
1974	Hudson County	Michael Miceli	Stanley R. Shapoff	Robert B. Cohen	7 furlongs	1:22.60	$57,800	III	
1973	Secretariat	Ron Turcotte	Lucien Laurin	Meadow Stable	7 furlongs	1:23.20	$27,750	III	
1972	Explodent	Mike Venezia	Eugene Jacobs	Herbert A. Allen Sr.	7 furlongs	1:23.40	$28,625		
1971	Hoist The Flag	Jean Cruguet	Sidney Watters Jr.	Stephen C. Clark Jr.	7 furlongs	1:21.00	$34,400		
1970	Sunny Tim	Chuck Baltazar	Frank A. Bonsal	Calumet Farm	7 furlongs	1:24.20	$29,900		
1969	Reviewer	Bobby Ussery	Edward A. Neloy	Ogden Phipps	7 furlongs	1:22.80	$27,650		
1968	Verbatim	John L. Rotz	Victor J. Nickerson	Elmendorf Farm	7 furlongs	1:24.20	$22,425		Division 1
1968	Clever Foot	Joe Culmone	Bernard P. Bond	Mrs. Bernard P. Bond	7 furlongs	1:26.00	$22,425		Division 2
1967	Damascus	Bill Shoemaker	Frank Y. Whiteley Jr.	Edith W. Bancroft	7 furlongs	1:25.80	$28,500		
1966	Quinta	Walter Blum	Bernard P. Bond	Richard D. Bokum II	7 furlongs	1:22.80	$28,900		
1965	Flag Raiser	Ismael Valenzuela	Hirsch Jacobs	Isidor Bieber	7 furlongs	1:23.60	$29,100		
1964	Determined Man	John Ruane	Eugene Jacobs	Herbert A. Allen Sr.	7 furlongs	1:23.20	$28,750		
1963	Jet Traffic (CAN)	Bobby Ussery	Del W. Carroll	Russell A. Firestone Jr.	1 mile	1:34.20	$28,050		
1962	Duc d'Or	Ismael Valenzuela	Monte Parke	James W. Rodgers	1 mile	1:36.80	$21,750		Division 1
1962	Western Warrior	Larry Adams	John A. Nerud	Tartan Stable	1 mile	1:36.40	$21,750		Division 2
1961	Merry Ruler (GB)	Roy L. Gilbert	Eddie Yowel	Harry O. Freylinghuysen	1 mile	1:36.40	$29,000		
Bay Shore Handicap
1960	Francis S.	Henry Moreno	Burley Parke	Harbor View Farm	1 mile	1:36.00	$29,450		

Notes:
† Run on the Inner dirt track

== See also ==
- List of American and Canadian Graded races
