= Pass Catcher =

American Thoroughbred racehorse

- Sire: All Hands
- Grandsire: Turn-To
- Dam: La Grue
- Damsire: Flaneur
- Sex: Stallion
- Foaled: 1968
- Country: United States
- Colour: Bay
- Breeder: Peter F. F. Kissel
- Owner: October House Farm
- Trainer: Edward J. Yowell
- Record: 25: 7–7–4
- Earnings: $268,729

Major wins
- Triple Crown race wins: Belmont Stakes (1971)

Pass Catcher (foaled April 6, 1968 in Kentucky) was a United States Thoroughbred racehorse that won the 103rd running of the Belmont Stakes.

== Background ==
Pass Catcher, a bay colt was bred and raced by Peter Kissel's October House Farm. His sire was All Hands and his dam was La Grue. All Hands was a son of Turn-To who was a grandson of the great English runner and outstanding sire, Nearco.

Pass Catcher was trained by Eddie Yowel who had won the 1965 Belmont Stakes with Hail To All.

== Racing career ==
At age two, the colt ran second in the 1970 Hopeful Stakes but came out of the race with a hairline fracture that kept him out of racing until the following March. Not ready for the first two legs of the rigorous Triple Crown races, Pass Catcher regained his racing form with a win in two straight races then, just five days before the Belmont Stakes, had a second-place finish to Bold Reasoning in the Jersey Derby.

The 1971 Belmont Stakes drew a record crowd of over 80,000, swelled by thousands of members of the New York City and area Latino community who came to cheer for Canonero II, the Venezuelan colt who had won the Kentucky Derby and Preakness Stakes and was poised to win the U.S. Triple Crown. Pass Catcher was ridden in the Belmont Stakes by Hall of Fame jockey Walter Blum. Pass Catcher disputed the lead with Canonero before drawing away and opening a five length lead. At the eighth pole, Blum dropped his whip but rode the colt to an upset victory over the fast-closing Jim French and Bold Reason with the favored Canonero finishing fourth.

Pass Catcher won minor races at age four until being retired to stand at stud.

== Stud career ==
He sired Amber Pass (b. 1977), a multiple stakes winner including the Monmouth Invitational Handicap. Among his other progeny were stakes winners, Amerilad, Melanie Frances, Michelle Can Pass, and Nice Catch.
