= Gravesend Handicap =

- Class: Non-graded stakes
- Location: Aqueduct Racetrack, Queens, New York, United States
- Inaugurated: 1885
- Race type: Thoroughbred – Flat racing
- Website: www.nyra.com/aqueduct/Stakes/Gravesend.shtml

Race information
- Distance: 6 furlongs
- Surface: Dirt
- Track: left-handed
- Qualification: Three-years-old & up
- Weight: Assigned
- Purse: $100,000 added

The Gravesend Handicap is an American Thoroughbred horse race run at Aqueduct Racetrack in Queens, New York late in the year. In its 61st running in December 2017, the Gravesend was downgraded from a Grade III event to ungraded status. This race is for three-year-olds and up and set at a distance of six furlongs. It offers a purse of $100,000 added.

== Background ==
The Gravesend is named in honor of the early American racetrack once sited near Coney Island, Brooklyn. The Gravesend Race Track was closed in 1910.

Prior to 1961, the Gravesend was run at Jamaica Race Course, and once, in 1975, at Belmont Park. In 1962, it was set at seven furlongs.

== Past winners ==
- 2024 – Maximus Meridius (3) (John R. Velazquez)
- 2023 – Bold Journey (4) (Eric Cancel)
- 2022 – Drafted (8) (Luis A. Rodriguez Castro)
- 2021 – Chateau (6) (Kendrick Carmouche)
- 2019 – Firenze Fire (4) (Jose Lezcano)
- 2018 – Recruiting Ready (4) (Eric Cancel)
- 2017 – Do Share (4) (Junior Alvarado)
- 2016 – Stallwalkin' Dude (6) (Irad Ortiz Jr.)
- 2015 – Green Gratto (5) (Kendrick Carmouche)
- 2014 – Salutos Amigos (4) (Irad Ortiz Jr.)
- 2013 – Strapping Groom (6) (Junior Alvarado)
- 2012 – Saginaw (6) (Junior Alvarado)
- 2011 – Frazil (5) (Cornelio Velásquez)
- 2010 – Calibrachoa (3) (David Cohen)
- 2009 – Digger (5) (Rosie Napravnik)
- 2008 – Fabulous Strike (5) (Ramon Domínguez)
- 2007 – City Attraction (Mike Luzzi)
- 2006 – Bishop Court Hill (John Velazquez)
- 2005 – Banjo Picker (5) (Tara Hemmings)
- 2004 – Don Six (4) (Mike Luzzi)
- 2003 – Shake You Down (5) (Mike Luzzi)
- 2002 – Multiple Choice (4) (Victor Carrero)
- 2001 – Here's Zealous (4) (Edgar Prado)
- 2000 – Say Florida Sandy (6) (Joe Bravo)
- 1999 – Cowboy Cop (5) (Aaron Gryder)
- 1998 – Say Florida Sandy (4) (Shaun Bridgmohan)
- 1997 – Royal Haven (5) (Richard Migliore), in a dead heat with
- 1997 – Stalwart Member (4) (Aaron Gryder)
- 1996 – Victor Avenue (3) (Jorge F. Chavez)
- 1995 – Cold Execution (4) (Julio Pezua)
- 1994 – Mining Burrah (4) (John Velazquez)
- 1993 – Astudillo (3) (Fabio Arguello Jr.)
- 1992 – Hidden Tomahawk (4) (Jorge F. Chavez)
- 1991 – Shuttleman (5) (Ángel Cordero Jr.)
- 1990 – Mr. Nasty (3) (Jerry D. Bailey)
- 1989 – Never Forgotten (5) (Art Madrid Jr.)
- 1988 – High Brite (4) (Ángel Cordero Jr.)
- 1987 – Vinnie The Viper (4) (Julie Krone)
- 1986 – Comic Blush (3) (Antonio Graell)
- 1985 – Love That Mac (3) (Jorge Velásquez)
- 1984 – Elegant Life (4) (Jorge Velásquez)
- 1983 – Main Stem (5) (Victor Lopez)
- 1982 – Chan Balum (3) (Jean-Luc Samyn)
- 1981 – Lines Of Power (4) (Don MacBeth)
- 1980 – Clever Trick (4) (Jorge Velásquez)
- 1979 – Shelter Half (4) (Sam Boulmetis Jr.)
- 1978 – Half High (5) (Angel Santiago)
- 1977 – Full Out (4) (Ángel Cordero Jr.)
- 1976 – Christopher R. (5) (William J. Passmore)
- 1975 – Honorable Miss (5) (Jacinto Vásquez)
- 1974 – Mr. Prospector (4) (Jacinto Vásquez)
- 1973 – Petrograd (4) (Ángel Cordero Jr.)
- 1972 – Silver Mallet (4) (Braulio Baeza)
- 1971 – Summer Air (4) (Ángel Cordero Jr.)
- 1970 – Distinctive (4) (Walter Blum)
- 1969 – Royal Exchange (4) (Ángel Cordero Jr.)
- 1968 – Jim J. (4) (Ángel Cordero Jr.)
- 1967 – Tumiga (3) (Ben Feliciano)
- 1966 – Winnie (4) (Eddie Belmonte)
- 1965 – Determined Man (4) (Michael Venezia)
- 1964 – Delta Judge (4) (Donald Pierce)
- 1963 – Ahoy (3) (Howard Grant)
- 1962 – Merry Ruler (4) (Johnny Sellers)
- 1961 – Bolinas Boy (3) (John L. Rotz)
- 1960 – Brush Fire (3) (Bobby Ussery)
- 1959 – Silver Ship (4) (Eddie Arcaro)
