= Toboggan Stakes =

- Class: Listed
- Location: Aqueduct Racetrack; Queens, New York, United States
- Inaugurated: 1890
- Race type: Thoroughbred – Flat racing
- Website: Aqueduct Racetrack at NYRA

Race information
- Distance: Seven furlong sprint
- Surface: Dirt
- Track: Left-handed
- Qualification: Three-year-olds & up
- Weight: 124 lbs with allowances (2019)
- Purse: $100,000

The Toboggan Stakes, formerly the Toboggan Handicap, is an American Thoroughbred horse race run annually during the first week of March at Aqueduct Race Track in Queens, New York. Open to horses aged three and older, the Listed event is contested over at a distance of six furlongs on the dirt and offers a purse of $150,000 added.

The 123rd running of The Toboggan Handicap was run in 2016. Before 1896, it was called the Toboggan Slide because it took place on the downhill Eclipse course at Morris Park Racecourse in the Bronx. The Toboggan Slide was not run in 1891 or 1895. The Toboggan Handicap was not run in 1911 and 1912.

In 2015, it was run in early February.

Since inception, the Toboggan Stakes has been contested at two different distances:

- 6 furlongs: 1890–1993, 2005–present
- 7 furlongs: 1995–2004,2018

In 2025 the event was downgraded by the Thoroughbred Owners and Breeders Association to Listed status.

== Records ==
Speed record: (at current distance of 7 furlongs)

- 1:20.77 – Brutally Frank (2000)

Most wins:

- 2 – Octagon (1897, 1898)
- 2 – Banastar (1899, 1901)
- 2 – High Noon (1915, 1916)
- 2 – Osmand (1928, 1929)
- 2 – Okapi (1933, 1934)
- 2 – Eight Thirty (1940, 1941)
- 2 – Devil Diver (1943, 1944)
- 2 – Rippey (1948, 1949)
- 2 – Boom Towner (1992, 1995)
- 2 – Affirmed Success (2002, 2003)
- 2 – Calibrachoa (2011, 2012)

Most wins by a jockey:

- 6 – Richard Migliore (1985, 1997, 1999, 2002, 2003, 2006)

Most wins by a trainer:

- 4 – James G. Rowe Sr. (1890, 1900, 1913, 1922)
- 4 – John J. Hyland (1896, 1897, 1898, 1903)
- 4 – H. Allen Jerkens (1957, 1963, 1969, 1970)

Most wins by an owner:

- 5 – August Belmont Jr. and/or Blemton Stable (1896, 1897, 1898, 1903, 1914)

== Winners of the Toboggan Stakes ==
Year	Winner	Age	Jockey	Trainer	Owner	Time
2025	Maximus Meridius	4	Mychel Sanchez	Robert E. Reid Jr.	LC Racing LLC, Cash is King LLC & Robert E. Reid Jr.	1:23.36
2024	Super Chow	4	Madison Olver	Jorge Delgado	Lea Farms	1:25.10
2023	Repo Rocks	5	Andrew Wolfsont	Jamie Ness	Double B Racing Stables	1:23.42
2022	Drafted	8	José Ortiz	David Duggan	Dublin Fjord Stables	1:25.06
2021	American Power	6	Kendrick Carmouche	Rob Atras	Sanford J. Goldfarb	1:24.28
2020	Mind Control	4	John Velazquez	Gregory D. Sacco	Red Oak Stable & Madaket Stables LLC	1:24.23
2019	Solid Wager	8	Jose Lezcano	Chris Englehart	Gary Barber	1:23.95
2018	Great Stuff	6	Dylan Davis	David Jacobson	Bruce Golden Racing	1:23.15
2017	Green Gratto	7	Kendrick Carmouche	Gaston Grant	Gaston Grant & Anthony Grant	1:10.74
2016	Sassicaia	5	John Bisono	Rudy R. Rodriguez	Robert V. LaPenta	1:10.56
2015	Salutos Amigos	5	Irad Ortiz Jr.	David Jacobson	Jacobson & Southern Equine Stable	1:09.53
2014	Candyman E	7	Charles C. Lopez	David Jacobson	Gold Square & Jacobson	1:10.34
2013	Head Heart Hoof	7	Cornelio Velásquez	Rudy R. Rodriguez	Dubb/Grant//Aisquith/Akman	1:09.86
2012	Calibrachoa	5	Cornelio Velásquez	Todd A. Pletcher	Repole Stable	1:09.47
2011	Calibrachoa	4	Ramon Domínguez	Todd A. Pletcher	Repole Stable	1:09.74
2010	Wall Street Wonder	4	Channing Hill	John Terranova II	Stetson Stables	1:09.88
2009	Ah Day	6	Sheldon Russel	King T. Leatherbury	King T. Leatherbury	1:10.28
2008	Sir Greeley	6	Eibar Coa	James A. Jerkens	Timber Bay Farm et al.	1:10.22
2007	Attila's Storm	5	Ramon Domínguez	Richard Schosberg	Schwartz, Wachtel	1:10.02
2006	Kazoo	8	Richard Migliore	Richard E. Dutrow Jr.	IEAH Stables et al.	1:09.22
2005	Primary Suspect	4	Pablo Fragoso	Mark A. Hennig	Lee Lewis	1:09.40
2004	Well Fancied	6	Eibar Coa	Richard E. Dutrow Jr.	Sanford Goldfarb et al.	1:22.00
2003	Affirmed Success	9	Richard Migliore	Richard Schosberg	Albert Fried Jr.	1:09.00
2002	Affirmed Success	8	Richard Migliore	Richard Schosberg	Albert Fried Jr.	1:22.80
2001	Peeping Tom	4	Shaun Bridgmohan	Patrick L. Reynolds	Flatbird Stable	1:21.20
2000	Brutally Frank	6	Shaun Bridgmohan	Mitchell Friedman	Sunny Meadow Farm	1:20.60
1999	Wouldn't We All	5	Richard Migliore	John C. Kimmel	Kimmel & Solondz	1:23.20
1998	Home On The Ridge	4	Herb McCauley	Pancho Martin	Viola Sommer	1:23.00
1997	Royal Haven	5	Richard Migliore	Gasper Moschera	Barbara Davis	1:22.40
1996	Placid Fund	4	Jorge F. Chavez	Dominic Galluscio	Team Valor	1:22.80
1995	Boom Towner	7	Frank Lovato Jr.	Michael E. Hushion	Barry K. Schwartz	1:23.60
1994	Blare of Trumpets	5	Dennis Carr	Michael E. Hushion	Dominick Salzano	1:09.60
1993	Argyle Lake	7	Dennis Carr	Peter Ferriola	James Riccio	1:10.00
1992	Boom Towner	4	Diane Nelson	John J. Lenzini Jr.	Anthony DeMarco	1:10.00
1991	Bravely Bold	5	Mike E. Smith	Robert P. Lake	Arthur I. Klein	1:10.60
1990	Sunny Blossom	5	Eddie Maple	Edwin J. Gregson	Martin Bauer	1:09.60
1989	Lord Of The Night	6	Jorge Velásquez	Dominick Galluscio	Winbound Farms	1:10.40
1988	Afleet	4	Gary Stahlbaum	Phil England	Richard R. Kennedy	1:09.20
1987	Play The King	4	Ruben Hernandez	Roger Attfield	Kinghaven Farm	1:09.60
1986	Rexson's Bishop	4	Rudy Baez	Ronald M. Perez	Sheila P. Arnold	1:11.40
1985	Fighting Fit	6	Richard Migliore	Robert J. Frankel	Jerry Moss	1:09.60
1984	Top Avenger	6	Antonio Graell	Jack D. Ludwig	John A. Franks	1:10.40
1983	Mouse Corps	5	Rolando Alvarado Jr.	Michael Sedlacek	Glenn E. Lane	1:09.40
1982	Always Run Lucky	4	Jimmy Miranda	John P. Campo	Rockwood Stable	1:10.00
1981	Dr. Blum	4	Ruben Hernandez	Howard M. Tesher	H. Joseph Allen	1:11.20
1980	Tilt Up	5	Jeffrey Fell	LeRoy Jolley	Bertram R. Firestone	1:11.00
1979	Vencedor	5	Miguel A. Rivera	Luis Barrera	Armando Cosme	1:10.00
1978	Barrera	5	Ruben Hernandez	Laz Barrera	Harbor View Farm	1:08.80
1977	Great Above	5	Steve Cauthen	Pancho Martin	Sigmund Sommer	1:09.40
1976	Due Diligence	4	Jorge Velásquez	Laz Barrera	Harbor View Farm	1:10.20
1975	Honorable Miss	5	Jacinto Vásquez	Frank Whiteley Jr.	Pen-Y-Bryn Farm	1:09.00
1974	Mike John G.	4	Vincent Bracciale Jr.	Kay Erik Jensen	Alfred J. Giordano	1:08.60
1973	Tentam	4	Jorge Velásquez	MacKenzie Miller	Cragwood Stables	1:09.40
1972	Leematt	4	Eldon Nelson	Joseph Considine	C. Oliver Goldsmith	1:09.40
1971	Shut Eye	5	Larry Adams	Jack M. Bradley	Key-Hill Stable	1:10.60
1970	Duck Dance	3	John Ruane	H. Allen Jerkens	Hobeau Farm	1:09.60
1969	Beaukins	4	Jean Cruguet	H. Allen Jerkens	Hobeau Farm	1:09.80
1968	Jim J.	4	Ángel Cordero Jr.	Edward J. Yowell	Harold Polk	1:09.80
1967	Advocator	4	Laffit Pincay Jr.	Clyde Troutt	Ada L. Rice	1:10.20
1966	Time Tested	4	Braulio Baeza	Edward A. Neloy	Ogden Mills Phipps	1:09.80
1965	Affectionately	5	Walter Blum	Hirsch Jacobs	Ethel D. Jacobs	1:09.40
1964	Scythe	4	Bill Hartack	LeRoy Jolley	Claiborne Farm	1:10.20
1963	Kilmoray	4	John L. Rotz	H. Allen Jerkens	Hobeau Farm	1:10.60
1962	Merry Ruler	4	Ismael Valenzuela	Edward J. Yowell	Harry Freylinghuysen	1:11.20
1961	April Skies †	4	Jack Fieselman	Gene Semler	Jerome De Renzo	1:10.00
1960	Intentionally	4	Bill Hartack	Edward Kelly Sr.	Brookfield Farm	1:10.60
1959	Tick Tock	6	Bobby Ussery	Edward A. Christmas	Howell E. Jackson III	1:10.80
1958	Bold Ruler	4	Eddie Arcaro	James Fitzsimmons	Wheatley Stable	1:09.00
1957	Decimal	5	Willie Lester	H. Allen Jerkens	Edward Seinfeld	1:09.40
1956	Nance's Lad	4	John Choquette	Hilton Dabson	Hilton Dabson	1:08.40
1955	Sailor II	3	Hedley Woodhouse	Preston M. Burch	Brookmeade Stable	1:08.80
1954	White Skies	5	Eddie Arcaro	Tommy Root	William M. Wickham	1:09.20
1953	Tuscany	5	Nick Shuk	J. Bowes Bond	Samuel M. Pistorio	1:10.00
1952	Dark Peter	4	Al Widman	Anthony J. Pupino	Harborvale Stables	1:09.20
1951	Hyphasis	4	Robert Bernhardt	James Fitzsimmons	Belair Stud	1:09.40
1950	Piet	5	Jimmy Nichols	R. Emmitt Potts	Peter A. Markey	1:10.60
1949	Rippey	6	Eric Guerin	Willie Booth	William G. Helis	1:09.40
1948	Rippey	5	Ovie Scurlock	Willie Booth	William G. Helis	1:09.60
1947	Buzfuz	5	Basil James	Joe Rosen	Sunshine Stable	1:11.00
1946	Polynesian	4	Wayne D. Wright	Morris H. Dixon	Gertrude T. Widener	1:13.00
1945	Apache	6	James Stout	James Fitzsimmons	Belair Stud	1:11.00
1944	Devil Diver	5	Eddie Arcaro	John M. Gaver Sr.	Greentree Stable	1:12.60
1943	Devil Diver	4	George Woolf	John M. Gaver Sr.	Greentree Stable	1:10.00
1942	Omission	4	John Gilbert	Joseph P. Smith	Victor Emanuel	1:10.80
1941	Eight Thirty	5	Harry Richards	Bert Mulholland	George D. Widener Jr.	1:11.20
1940	Eight Thirty	4	Harry Richards	Bert Mulholland	George D. Widener Jr.	1:09.80
1939	Entracte	3	Nick Wall	Henry McDaniel	A. G. C. Stage	1:11.00
1938	Deliberator	5	Wayne D. Wright	Sherrill W. Ward	Everglade Stable	1:11.00
1937	Preeminent	5	Harry Richards	Duval A. Headley	Hal Price Headley	1:11.20
1936	Singing Wood	5	John Gilbert	James W. Healy	Liz Whitney	1:10.80
1935	Identify	4	Sam Renick	Bud Stotler	Alfred G. Vanderbilt II	1:11.60
1934	Okapi	4	Mack Garner	Robert A. Smith	Brookmeade Stable	1:10.60
1933	Okapi	3	Dominick Bellizzi	Robert A. Smith	Brookmeade Stable	1:11.40
1932	Equipose	4	Raymond Workman	Fred Hopkins	C. V. Whitney	1:09.60
1931	Caruso	4	J. Meek	Bennet Creech	William R. Coe	1:14.80
1930	Balko	5	John Bejshak	Bud Stotler	Sagamore Stable	1:11.40
1929	Osmand	5	Willie Garner	Pete Coyne	Joseph E. Widener	1:10.60
1928	Osmand	4	Earl Sande	Pete Coyne	Joseph E. Widener	1:11.40
1927	Chance Play	4	Earl Sande	John I. Smith	Log Cabin Stable	1:11.00
1926	Sarmaticus	3	Harry Richards	George M. Odom	Robert L. Gerry Sr.	1:12.20
1925	Worthmore	4	Albert Johnson	John S. Ward	Everglade Stable	1:11.00
1924	Sheridan	3	Laverne Fator	Sam Hildreth	Rancocas Stable	1:11.60
1923	Mad Hatter	7	Earl Sande	Sam Hildreth	Rancocas Stable	1:10.60
1922	Rocket	8	L. Penman	James G. Rowe Sr.	Harry Payne Whitney	1:11.00
1921	Gladiator	4	Clarence Kummer	William Shields	Redstone Stable	1:08.80
1920	Lion d'Or	4	Eddie Ambrose	Thomas J. Healey	T. J. Healey/W. B. Jennings	1:09.60
1919	Billy Kelly	3	Johnny Loftus	H. Guy Bedwell	J. K. L. Ross	1:10.80
1918	Naturalist	4	Merritt C. Buxton	Thomas Welsh	Joseph E. Widener	1:10.00
1917	Campfire	3	John McTaggart	Thomas J. Healey	Richard T. Wilson Jr.	1:11.20
1916	High Noon	4	Johnny Loftus	John H. McCormack	James Butler	1:10.80
1915	High Noon	3	Charles Borel	Richard C. Benson	James Butler	1:09.60
1914	Rock View	4	James Butwell	Sam Hildreth	August Belmont Jr.	1:12.20
1913	Iron Mask	5	Roscoe Troxler	James G. Rowe Sr.	Harry Payne Whitney	1:10.00
1912	no race					
1911	no race					
1910	Mary Davis	4	J. H. "Buddy" Glass	Not found	R. H. Davis	1:13.00
1909	De Mund	5	James Butwell	Edward Peters	Paul J. Rainey	1:11.00
1908	Berry Maid	3	H. Shreve	Raleigh Colston	Fred A. Forsythe	1:11.60
1907	Ben Ban	4	Charles Garner	John Huggins	Herman B. Duryea	1:16.40
1906	Clark Griffith	3	Walter Miller	Frank D. Weir	Frank J. Farrell	1:11.60
1905	Roseben	4	Frank O'Neill	Charles Oxx	David C. Johnson	1:13.00
1904	Hurst Park	4	George M. Odom	J. D. Odom	Matthew Corbett	1:14.00
1903	Mizzen	3	John Bullman	John J. Hyland	August Belmont Jr.	1:11.50
1902	Old England	3	Johnny Woods	Green B. Morris	Green B. Morris	1:12.75
1901	Banastar	6	George M. Odom	Charles F. Hill	Clarence H. Mackay	1:13.50
1900	Voter	6	Henry Spencer	James G. Rowe Sr.	James R. Keene	1:12.25
1899	Banastar	4	Danny Maher	Matthew M. Allen	William H. Clark	1:09.00
1898	Octagon	4	Willie Simms	John J. Hyland	August Belmont Jr.	1:15.25
1897	Octagon	3	E. Hewitt	John J. Hyland	August Belmont Jr.	1:12.00
1896	Hastings	3	Henry Griffin	John J. Hyland	Blemton Stable	1:12.75
1895	no race					
1894	Correction	6	Fred Littlefield	R. Wyndham Walden	J.A./ A.H. & D. H. Morris	1:10.50
1893	Prince George	3	John Lamley	Hardy Campbell Jr.	Richard Croker	1:11.50
1892	Madstone	6	Edward Garrison	Gus Hannen	Empire Stable	1:13.00
1891	no race					
1890	Fides	4	Anthony Hamilton	James G. Rowe Sr.	August Belmont	1:10.25

* † In 1961, Chief of Chiefs finished first, but was disqualified.
