= Roy L. Gilbert =

American jockey

Roy Gilbert
Personal information
- Born: June 18, 1938 London, Kentucky, United States
- Died: April 4, 1961 (aged 22)
- Occupation: Jockey

Horse racing career
- Sport: Horse racing
- Career wins: 174

Major racing wins
- Swift Stakes (1961); John B. Campbell Handicap (1961); Bay Shore Handicap (1961)

Significant horses
- Merry Ruler

Roy Lee Gilbert (June 18, 1938 – April 4, 1961) was an American Thoroughbred horse racing jockey who died as a result of a racing accident. A United Press International news release at the time of his death called him "one of the most promising young jockeys in the country."

== Early life ==
Born in London, Kentucky, Roy Gilbert was one of 19 children. He began working in the Thoroughbred racing industry in 1954 as a stable hand then as an exercise rider for the future U.S. Racing Hall of Fame trainer, Woody Stephens. In 1957, Gilbert began riding professionally but in June 1958 was sidelined for a time after he suffered a broken leg as a result of being thrown from his horse during a race at Monmouth Park Racetrack in Oceanport, New Jersey.

== Death ==
On April 4, 1961, at Aqueduct Racetrack in Queens, New York, Gilbert was thrown from his horse Plenty Papaya, during the fourth race, and struck his head on the concrete base of a rail post. He died on the way to hospital. He was a few months shy of his 23rd birthday.

== Personal life ==
His brother William had been a jockey, and their nephew, Bobby Gilbert, became a jockey in 1975 at age 17.
