= Eddie Belmonte =

Puerto Rican jockey (1943–2026)

- Belmonte after winning the 1970 Preakness Stakes

Personal information
- Born: February 5, 1943 Santurce, Puerto Rico
- Died: September 30, 2026 (aged 83)
- Occupation: Jockey

Horse racing career
- Sport: Horse racing
- Career wins: 1,800+

Major racing wins
- Manhattan Handicap (1966, 1969); Santa Monica Handicap (1966); Brooklyn Handicap (1967, 1969); National Stallion Stakes (1967, 1969); Prioress Stakes (1967); Washington Park Handicap (1967); Whitney Handicap (1967); Donn Handicap (1968); Flamingo Stakes (1968); Jersey Derby (1968, 1970); Matron Stakes (1968); Youthful Stakes (1968); Diana Handicap (1969, 1972, 1973, 1974); Hawthorne Gold Cup Handicap (1969); San Gabriel Handicap (1969, 1972); Santa Anita Handicap (1969); Santa Maria Handicap (1969); San Fernando Stakes (1969, 1971, 1972); Vagrancy Handicap (1969); Spinster Stakes (1970); Tremont Stakes (1970, 1971); Widener Handicap (1970); Wood Memorial Stakes (1970); Woodward Stakes (1970); Jerome Handicap (1971); Roamer Handicap (1971, 1972); Delaware Handicap (1972); Metropolitan Handicap (1972); Hollywood Derby (1973); Lawrence Realization Stakes (1973); Mother Goose Stakes (1973) American Classic Race wins: Preakness Stakes (1970)

Significant horses
- Amberoid, Autobiography, Dark Mirage, Gallant Bloom, Gamely, Hail To All, Nodouble, Personality, Ta Wee,

Eddie Belmonte (February 5, 1943 – September 30, 2026) was a Puerto Rican jockey who competed at the highest levels in Thoroughbred horse racing in his native Puerto Rico and in the United States.

After much success riding in Puerto Rico, Eddie Belmonte came to the United States in the latter part of 1964 to compete at New York and area racetracks. He was the first Puerto Rican jockey to compete in the Kentucky Derby, riding Exhibitionist in the 1966 running of the American Classic. His crowning career achievement came as the jockey of Personality, winner of the 1970 Preakness Stakes and that year's Eclipse Award for American Horse of the Year.

In addition to riding in New York, Belmonte rode successfully at tracks in New Jersey, Florida, and California. On February 17, 1972, he rode five winners in a single day at Santa Anita Park in Arcadia, California. In October 1973, Belmonte traveled to Longchamp Racecourse in Paris, France to ride in the prestigious Prix de l'Arc de Triomphe. Aboard El Famoso, he finished out of the money.

Belmonte retired as a jockey in 1976 and later worked as a riding instructor and jockeys' agent. He attempted a comeback in 1977 but on April 18, after winning a race at Aqueduct Racetrack, Belmonte suddenly collapsed and fell from his horse. His collapse came about as a result of an effort to meet riding weight limits through a dieting process that brought rapid weight loss.

Belmonte died on September 30, 2026, at the age of 83.

== Selected other wins ==
- Queens County Handicap (1965)
- Adirondack Stakes (1966, 1971)
- Derby Trial Stakes (1966)
- Gravesend Handicap (1966)
- Santa Catalina Stakes (1966)
- Jim Dandy Stakes (1967, 1973)
- Lamplighter Stakes (1967)
- Sport Page Handicap (1967)
- Test Stakes (1967, 1969, 1970)
- Bowling Green Handicap (1968)
- Discovery Handicap (1968)
- Red Smith Handicap (1968)
- Stymie Handicap (1968)
- Californian Stakes (1969)
- Comely Stakes (1969)
- Miss Woodford Stakes (1969)
- San Felipe Stakes (1969)
- Santa Ysabel Stakes (1969, 1971)
- Saranac Stakes (1969)
- Schuylerville Stakes (1969)
- Arlington Classic (1970)
- Display Handicap (1970)
- Stuyvesant Handicap (1970)
- Baldwin Stakes (1971)
- San Gorgonio Handicap (1972)
- San Gabriel Handicap (1972)
- San Marcos Stakes (1972)
- Santa Paula Stakes (1972)
- Santa Ana Handicap (1973)
- La Brea Stakes (1975)
