= Jersey Derby =

- Class: Listed
- Location: Monmouth Park; Oceanport, New Jersey, United States
- Inaugurated: 1942
- Race type: Thoroughbred – Flat racing
- Website: Monmouth Park Racetrack

Race information
- Distance: 1 miles (8 furlongs)
- Surface: Turf
- Track: Left-handed
- Qualification: Three-year-olds
- Weight: 123 lbs. (allowances)
- Purse: $100,000

The Jersey Derby is a $100,000 American Thoroughbred horse race for three-year-olds held annually in late July/early August at Monmouth Park Racetrack in Oceanport, New Jersey. Since 1993, it has been raced on grass at a distance of 1 1/16 miles.

A Jersey Derby was run on June 7, 1864, at a racetrack in Paterson, New Jersey. The one-time event was won by Robert A. Alexander's colt Norfolk. When the Garden State Park Racetrack opened in 1942, it created the Jersey Handicap, which was renamed the Jersey Stakes in 1948. Since 1960, it has been known as the Jersey Derby.

In the spring of 1977, a fire destroyed Garden State Park, and the race was shifted to the Atlantic City Race Course, where it was run that year. The race resumed in 1981 at the Atlantic City track and was raced there for four years until it returned to Garden State Park in 1985, where it remained through 1998.

Now a Listed race, at one time the Jersey Derby was one of the premier events on the American summer racing calendar. It counts among its winners greats such as 1948's U.S. Triple Crown champion, Citation, and nine other American Classic winners, plus two-time Breeders' Cup Mile winner Da Hoss. In 1998, Who Did It and Run became the first filly to ever win the Jersey Derby. She did it in the final year the race was held at Garden State Park before it moved to its present location at Monmouth Park.

Since inception in 1942, the race has been contested at various distances:

- 1 mile: 2021 to present
- 1 1/16 miles : 1993 to 2020
- 1 1/8 miles : 1942–1947, 1953–1984, 1991–1992
- 1 1/4 miles : 1948–1952, 1985–1990

The turf race had to be moved to the dirt track for the 2001, 2003, and 2021 editions.

== Records ==
Speed record:

- 1:40.80 – Swamp (1 1/16 mile on turf, 1999)
- 1:34.93 - Boppy O (1 mile on turf, 2023)

Most wins by a jockey:

- 3 – Craig Perret : (1981, 1988, 1989)
- 3 – Julie Krone : (1993, 1995, 1996)
- 3 - Joe Bravo : (2009, 2012, 2019)

== Winners ==
Year	Winner	Jockey	Trainer	Owner	Time
2025					
2024	Twirling Point	Frankie Dettori	Jonathan Thomas	Augustin Stables	1:34.76
2023	Boppy O	Isaac Castillo	Mark E. Casse	Oxley, John C. and Breeze Easy, LLC	1:34.02
2022	Fuerteventura	Isaac Castillo	Jonathan Thomas	Robert V. LaPenta and Brereton C. Jones	1:34.93
2021	It's a Gamble	Jose Baez	Kelly Breen	Mr. Amore Stable	1:40.70
2020	Vanzzy	Paco Lopez	Michael Pino	Daniel M. Ryan	1:42.30
2019	Standard Deviation	Joe Bravo	Chad Brown	Klaravich Stables	1:41.70
2013	Hard Enough	Paco Lopez	Robert S. Dibona	Peace Sign Stables	1:41.06
2012	Howe Great	Joe Bravo	H. Graham Motion	Team Valor International	1:42.67
2011	Breathless Storm	Paco Lopez	Kiaran McLaughlin	Mrs. Fitriani Hay	1:41.06
2010	Hudson Steele	Jose Lezcano	Todd Pletcher	Roger J. Weiss	1:41.07
2009	Endymion	Joe Bravo	Christophe Clement	Peachtree Stable (John Fort)	1:44:22
2008	Mr. Maccool	Eddie Castro	David Fawkes	Donamire Farm (Don & Mira Ball)	1:42.01
2007	Buddy's Humor	Garrett Gomez	Bruce N. Levine	Kingfield Stables (Eli Lomita & Alice Sim)	1:41.64
2006	Presious Passion	Eddie Castro	Mary Hartmann	Patricia A. Generazio	1:41.02
2005	Touched By Madness	Frank Pennington	Edward T. Allard	Gilbert G. Campbell	1:43.54
2004	Icy Atlantic	Chuck Lopez	Todd Pletcher	Arthur I. Appleton	1:44.51
2003	Happy Trails	Abdiel Toribio	Steve B. Klesaris	Sanford J. Goldfarb	1:45.40
2002	Emergency Status	Robert Alvarado Jr.	Derek S. Ryan	Henick Stable	1:42.26
2001	Mystic Lady	Filiberto Leon	Mark Hennig	Lee Lewis	1:44.31
2000	Lendell Ray	Aaron Gryder	William I. Mott	Eigel & Glass, LLP	1:42.96
1999	Swamp	Richard Migliore	John C. Kimmel	Heiligbrodt Racing Stable (L. William & Corinne Heiligbrodt)	1:40.94
1998	Who Did It and Run	Felix L. Ortiz	Debra J. Sones	Debra J. Sones	1:41.20
1997	Rob 'N Gin	Jerry Bailey	Robert Barbara	Nancy Kelly & Sabine Stable (Joseph Greeley)	1:40.80
1996	More Royal	Julie Krone	Jonathan Sheppard	Augustin Stable	1:42.46
1995	Da Hoss	Julie Krone	Michael Dickinson	Prestonwood/Wallstreet Sta.	1:43.00
1994	Zuno Star	Mike E. Smith	Mark Hennig	Team Valor	1:43.86
1993	Llandaff	Julie Krone	William I. Mott	Sheikh Mohammed	1:42.50
1992	American Chance	Pat Day	Niall M. O'Callaghan	John D. Gunther	1:50.80
1991	Greek Costume	Mike E. Smith	Warren A. Croll Jr.	Robert P. Levy	1:51.40
1990	Yonder	Jerry Bailey	Angel Penna Sr.	Frank Stronach	2:04.40
1989	Awe Inspiring	Craig Perret	C. R. McGaughey III	Ogden Mills Phipps	2:03.00
1988	Dynaformer	Craig Perret	D. Wayne Lukas	Paul Lynn	2:02.80
1987	Avie's Copy	Mickey Solomone	David Kassen	T. Brown Badgett	2:03.40
1986	Snow Chief	Alex Solis	Melvin F. Stute	Carl Grinstead & Ben Rochelle	2:03.00
1985	Spend a Buck	Laffit Pincay Jr.	Cam Gambolati	Hunter Farm (Dennis Diaz)	2:02.60
1984	Birdie's Legend	Walter Guerra	Steven W. Young	T-Bred Stable (Leslie Steiner)	1:49.00
1983	World Appeal	Jacinto Vásquez	Scotty Schulhofer	Elton D. Kohr	1:46.60
1982	Aloma's Ruler	Ángel Cordero Jr.	John J. Lenzini Jr.	Nathan Scherr	1:49.60
1981	Five Star Flight	Craig Perret	Ben W. Perkins Sr.	M/M Arnold A. Wilcox	1:50.00
1977	Cormorant	Danny Wright	James P. Simpson	Charles Berry Jr.	1:50.40
1976	Life's Hope	Miguel A. Rivera	Laz Barrera	E. Rodriguez Tizol	1:52.60
1975	Singh	Ángel Cordero Jr.	John W. Russell	Cynthia Phipps	1:50.80
1974	Better Arbitor	Carlos Barrerra	Del W. Carroll	Del W. Carroll	1:50.40
1973	Knightly Dawn	Jaime Arellano	Pancho Martin	Sigmund Sommer	1:53.20
1972	Smiling Jack	Frank Iannelli	Ralph W. McIlvain	Eicee-H Stable	1:50.60
1971	Bold Reasoning	Jacinto Vásquez	Nick Gonzales	Kosgrove Stable (William Kosnick & Charles T. Hargrove)	1:49.60
1970	Personality	Eddie Belmonte	John W. Jacobs	Ethel D. Jacobs	1:48.00
1969	Al Hattab	Michael Hole	Warren A. Croll Jr.	Pelican Stable (Rachel Carpenter)	1:48.00
1968	Out of the Way	Eddie Belmonte	Max Hirsch	King Ranch	1:49.00
1967	In Reality †	Earlie Fires	Melvin Calvert	Frances A. Genter	1:48.00
1966	Creme Dela Crème	Don Brumfield	Ira Hanford	Bwamazon Farm	1:49.60
1965	Hail To All	Johnny Sellers	Eddie Yowell	Zelda Cohen	1:48.60
1964	Roman Brother	Fernando Alvarez	Burley Parke	Harbor View Farm	1:49.60
1963	Candy Spots	Bill Shoemaker	Mesh Tenney	Rex C. Ellsworth	1:50.00
1962	Jaipur	Larry Adams	Bert Mulholland	George D. Widener Jr.	1:49.00
1961	Ambiopoise	Bobby Ussery	Thomas M. Waller	Robert Lehman	1:49.20
1960	Bally Ache	Bobby Ussery	Jimmy Pitt	Edgehill Farm (Leonard & Morris Fruchtmam)	1:49.00
1959	Waltz	Larry Gilligan	Max Hirsch	W. Arnold Hanger	1:49.60
1958	Lincoln Road	Chris Rogers	Victor J. Sovinski	Sunny Blue Farm (Isaac Blumberg)	1:49.00
1957	Iron Liege	Bill Hartack	Jimmy Jones	Calumet Farm	1:48.00
1956	Fabius	Bill Hartack	Jimmy Jones	Calumet Farm	1:48.80
1955	Dedicate	Sam Boulmetis Sr.	G. Carey Winfrey	Mrs. Jan Burke	1:48.20
1954	War of Roses	Jack Westrope	James E. Ryan	Esther du Pont Thouron	1:51.60
1953	Royal Bay Gem	Jimmy Combest	Clyde Troutt	Eugene Constantin Jr.	1:53.20
1952	King Jolie	James Stout	Hirsch Jacobs	Isidor Bieber	2:03.60
1951	Steadfast	Hedley Woodhouse	Preston M. Burch	Brookmeade Stable	2:04.40
1950	Ferd	Conn McCreary	Andy Schuttinger	Mary E. Schuttinger	2:02.80
1949	Palestinian	Hedley Woodhouse	Hirsch Jacobs	Isidor Bieber	2:01.80
1948	Citation	Eddie Arcaro	Ben A. Jones	Calumet Farm	2:03.00
1947	Double Jay	John Gilbert	Walter L. McCue	Ridgewood Stable (James V. Tigani & James Boines)	1:49.60
1946	Mahout	Wayne D. Wright	Oscar White	Sarah F. Jeffords	1:49.20
1945	Trymenow	Herb Linberg	Oscar White	Sarah F. Jeffords	1:51.80
1944	Lucky Draw	Wayne D. Wright	Bert Mulholland	George D. Widener Jr.	1:50.40
1943	Eurasian	Frankie Zehr	Sol Rutchick	Mill River Stable (Josephine Douglas)	1:50.40
1942	Salto	Warren Mehrtens	Max Hirsch	King Ranch	1:49.80

† In 1967, Dr. Fager came first but was disqualified for interference.
