= Capossela =

Capossela is an Italian surname from Irpinia, Campania. Notable people with the name include:

- Chris Capossela (born 1969), American senior Microsoft executive
- Fred Capossela (1902–1991), American Thoroughbred race track announcer
  - Fred "Cappy" Capossela Stakes, American Thoroughbred horse race
- Vinicio Capossela (born 1965), Italian singer-songwriter
