= Joe Culmone =

American jockey (1931–1996)

Personal information
- Born: May 13, 1931 Delia, Sicily, Italy
- Died: July 23, 1996 (aged 65) Cherry Hill, New Jersey, U.S.
- Occupation: Jockey

Horse racing career
- Sport: Horse racing
- Career wins: 3,000+

Major racing wins
- Garden State Stakes (1950, 1965); Monmouth Handicap (1950); Ocean City Handicap (1951); Gotham Stakes (1955); Miss Woodford Stakes (1958); Sport Page Handicap (1958); Wilson Handicap (1958); Monmouth Oaks (1959); Salvator Mile Handicap (1957, 1963, 1964); Barbara Fritchie Handicap (1962); Marguerite Stakes (1963); Black-Eyed Susan Stakes (1966); Bay Shore Handicap (1968); Swift Stakes (1968)

Racing awards
- United States Co-Champion Jockey by wins (1950)

Significant horses
- Greek Ship

Joseph Culmone (May 13, 1931 – July 23, 1996) was an American Champion jockey in the sport of Thoroughbred racing.

Culmone was born in Delia, Sicily, where he lived in a farming area and learned to ride horses. His mother died during World War II and in 1946 he emigrated to the United States to join his father in Atlantic City, New Jersey. He began working as a stable hand and exercise rider at the Atlantic City Race Course and embarked on his jockey career at Tropical Park Race Track in Florida in late 1948. A year later, he was meeting with great success as an apprentice rider, scoring back-to-back triple wins on racecards at Tropical Park in December 1949. In 1950 Culmone tied the great Bill Shoemaker for the most wins of any jockey in the United States with 388, a total that equaled a forty-four-year-old world record set by Walter Miller in 1906.

Culmone worked as a contract rider for the famous Brookmeade Stable and also rode for noted owners such as Calumet Farm and Harry Z. Isaacs. During his career, he competed primarily at racetracks from New York along the Eastern Seaboard to Florida and at Oriental Park Racetrack in Cuba. He rode five winners on a single racecard several times and on November 27, 1950, won six races on a single card at Bowie Race Track. In the U.S. Triple Crown series, Culmone had five rides in the Preakness Stakes with his best finish a sixth in 1957 and again in 1964.

Retired from racing in 1972, Joe Culmone died in 1996 at age 65 at his home in Cherry Hill, New Jersey.

== Sources ==
- December 15, 1949 Miami News article on jockey Joe Culmone
- Obituary for Joseph Culmone at The Press of Atlantic City
