= Mike Luzzi =

American jockey (born 1969)

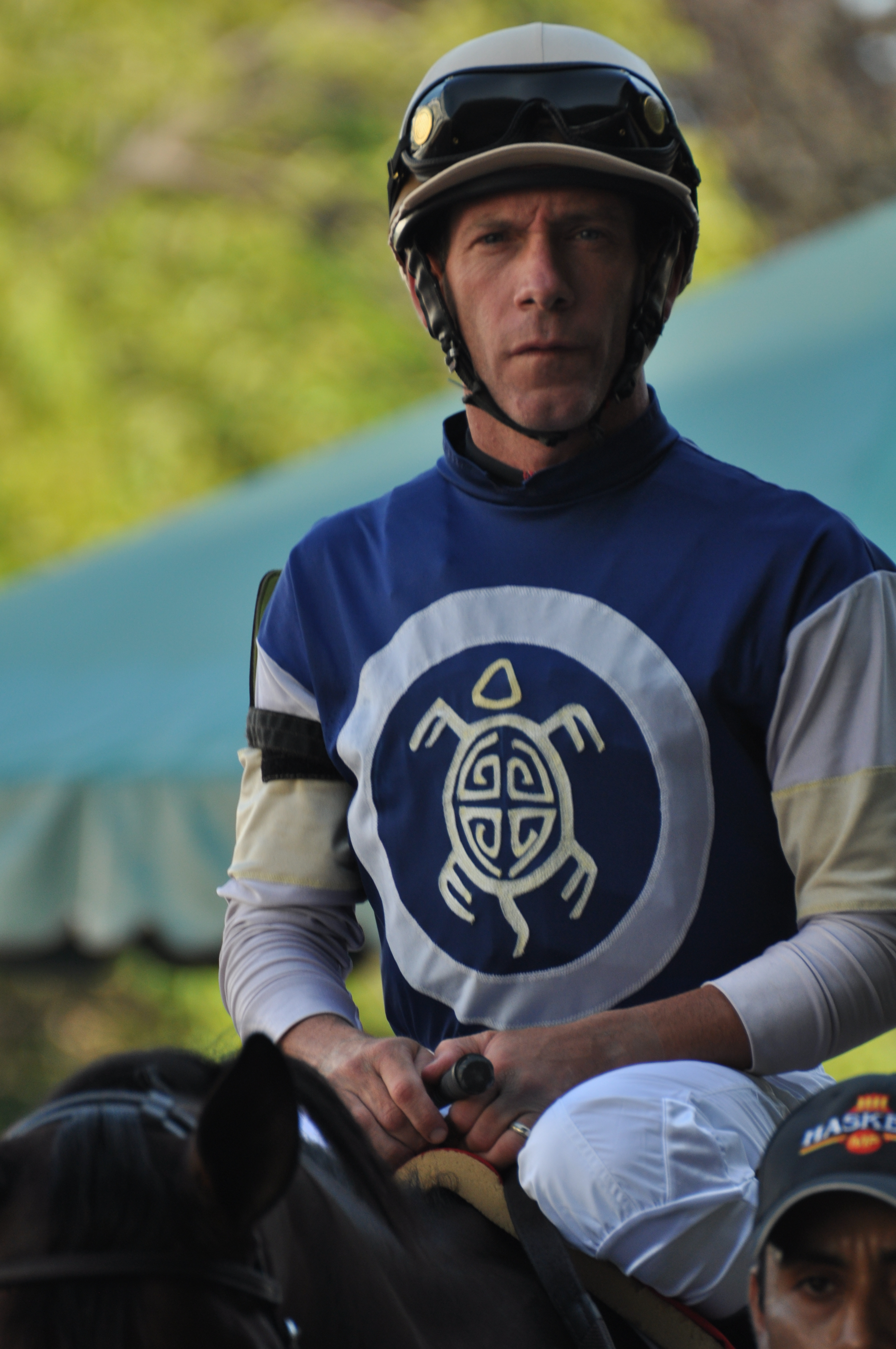
- August 20, 2011, at Monmouth Park.

Personal information
- Born: October 27, 1969 (age 56) Wilmington, Delaware, U.S.
- Occupation: Jockey

Horse racing career
- Sport: Horse racing
- Career wins: 3400+

Major racing wins
- Brooklyn Handicap (1991); General George Handicap (1991, 1999, 2012); Maryland Million Classic (1991); Laurel Turf Cup Stakes (1991, 1992); Carousel Stakes (1992); Selima Stakes (1992); Delaware Handicap (1993); Correction Handicap (1994, 2004); Paumonok Handicap (1994, 1999); Sport Page Breeders' Cup Handicap (1994); Knickerbocker Handicap (1994); Next Move Handicap (1994, 1995, 2007, 2009); Rare Treat Handicap (1994, 1995); New Hampshire Sweepstakes Handicap (1994, 1995); Long Island Handicap (1994); Busher Stakes (1995); Jimmy Winkfield Stakes (1995); Bay Shore Stakes (1995); Westchester Handicap (1995, 2007); Sword Dancer Invitational Handicap (1995); Bashford Manor Stakes (1996); Cliff Hanger Handicap (1996); Aqueduct Handicap (1996, 2003); East View Stakes (1996); First Flight Handicap (1997); Top Flight Handicap (1997); Bed O' Roses Handicap (1998, 2007); Malibu Stakes (1998); Whirlaway Stakes (1998, 2007); Cowdin Stakes (1999); Damon Runyon Stakes (1999, 2012); Fort Marcy Handicap (1999); Interborough Handicap (2000, twice); Prioress Stakes (2000); Gallant Fox Handicap (2001, 2002, 2005, 2007); Sheepshead Bay Handicap (2001); Molly Pitcher Stakes (2001); Hempstead Handicap (2001); Coaching Club American Oaks (2002); Hill Prince Stakes (2002); Ladies Handicap (2002); Beaugay Handicap (2003); Iroquois Handicap (2003, 2005); Smile Sprint Handicap (2003); Bold Ruler Handicap (2003); Gravesend Handicap (2003, 2004, 2007); Distaff Handicap (2003); True North Handicap (2003); Sunshine Millions Sprint (2004); Tremont Stakes (2004); Nassau County Handicap (2005); Apple Blossom Handicap (2006); Frizette Stakes (2006); Go For Wand Handicap (2006); Kelso Breeders' Cup Handicap (2006); Stuyvesant Handicap (2006); Stymie Handicap (2006); Violet Stakes (2006); Cigar Mile Handicap (2007); Sport Page Handicap (2007); Jerome Handicap (2007, 2012); Queens County Handicap (2008); Shuvee Handicap (2008); Comely Stakes (2010); New York Derby (2010); Pegasus Stakes (2012); Laurel Dash Stakes (2015)

Racing awards
- U.S. Champion Apprentice Jockey (1989); Mike Venezia Memorial Award (2001); George Woolf Memorial Jockey Award (2015)

Significant horses
- Da Hoss, Timely Warning, Shake You Down, Kiri's Clown, Coyote Lakes, Daaher, The Lumber Guy, Researcher, Critical Eye, Dixie Flag

Michael Jude Luzzi (born October 27, 1969, in Wilmington, Delaware) is an American jockey. He grew up near Delaware Park Racetrack where his grandfather, trainer Buddy Raines, had a major role in raising him and his brother John who also became a jockey. One of the family's great memories came in 1991 when the then eighty-year-old Raines saddled Timely Warning and watched as his grandson won the Maryland Million Classic and the Brooklyn Handicap.

Luzzi began his riding career in 1988 at race tracks in Maryland and in 1989 was voted the Eclipse Award for Outstanding Apprentice Jockey. He won five races in a single day at Pimlico Race Course on September 21, 1993. In 1994, he moved his tack to NY to compete on the New York Racing Association circuit. Luzzi has been a mainstay on the NYRA circuit since his arrival. In 1994 and in 2001 the NYRA voted him the Mike Venezia Memorial Award, an honor given to a jockey who exemplifies extraordinary sportsmanship and citizenship. Since arriving in NY, Luzzi has consistently been one of the top jockeys on the NYRA circuit. In recent years, he has gained some national exposure by riding in various stakes races throughout the United States. On April 12, 2015, Mike Luzzi accepted the George Woolf Memorial Jockey Award at Santa Anita Park. It is one of the highest honors for a jockey and their contributions both on and off the track.

He is the father of jockey Lane Luzzi.

== Year-end charts ==
Chart (2000–present)	Peak position
National Earnings List for Jockeys 2000	47
National Earnings List for Jockeys 2001	63
National Earnings List for Jockeys 2002	36
National Earnings List for Jockeys 2003	21
National Earnings List for Jockeys 2004	41
National Earnings List for Jockeys 2005	30
National Earnings List for Jockeys 2006	18
National Earnings List for Jockeys 2007	32
National Earnings List for Jockeys 2008	49
National Earnings List for Jockeys 2009	76
National Earnings List for Jockeys 2011	74
National Earnings List for Jockeys 2012	78
