= Fred "Cappy" Capossela Stakes =

- Class: Discontinued
- Location: Aqueduct Racetrack; Queens, New York, United States
- Inaugurated: 1885 (as Swift Stakes at Sheepshead Bay Race Track)
- Final run: 2015
- Race type: Thoroughbred – Flat racing
- Website: www.nyra.com/index_aqueduct.html

Race information
- Distance: 6 furlongs
- Surface: Dirt
- Track: left-handed
- Qualification: Three-year-olds
- Weight: Assigned
- Purse: $100,000

The Fred "Cappy" Capossela Stakes was an American Thoroughbred horse race. The event was held each February since 1885 at Aqueduct Racetrack, this race was originally called the Swift Stakes (where it was originally held at Sheepshead Bay Race Track), until its name was changed in 1993 in honor of racing announcer Fred Capossela. The six-furlong dirt race was open to three-year-olds. The event was last held in 2015.

== Records ==
Speed record:

- 1:09.40 – Solo Landing (1967)
- 1:09.40 – Shimatoree (1982)

Most wins by an owner:

- 3 – Cornelius Vanderbilt Whitney (1934, 1937, 1940)
- 3 – Brookmeade Stable (1932, 1946, 1952)

Most wins by a jockey:

- 4 – Eddie Arcaro (1950, 1957, 1959, 1960)
- 4 – Ángel Cordero Jr. (1971, 1975, 1984, 1987)

== Winners ==
Year	Winner	Age	Jockey	Trainer	Owner	Dist. (Miles)	Time	Win $	Gr.
2015	Majestic Affair	3	Kendrick Carmouche	Chad Brown	James Covello, Thomas Coleman, Doheny Racing Stable, LLC (Michael Doheny)	6 f	1:11.78	$60,000	B/T
2014	Oliver Zip	3	Rajiv Maragh	Kelly J. Breen	George & Lori Hall	6 f	1:10.21	$60,000	B/T
2013	Maleeh	3	Eddie Castro	Kiaran McLaughlin	Shadwell Stable	6 f	1:10.21	$60,000	B/T
2012	Hardened Wildcat	3	Junior Alvarado	Chad Brown	New Farm (Everette & Nancy Novak)	6 f	1:10.89	$60,000	B/T
2011	Sensational Slam	3	Ramon A. Dominguez	Todd A. Pletcher	Bobby Flay	6 f	1:10.61	$39,000	B/T
2010	Castaneda	3	Jorge Chavez	Gary C. Contessa	Team Stallion Racing (Jeffrey & Dave Massaro)	6 f	1:10.48	$39,000	B/T
2009	Not for Silver	3	Ramon Dominguez	Michael J. Trombetta	Ted Julio	6 f	1:10.38	$41,910	B/T
2008	Go Go Shoot	3	Chuck Lopez	James T. Ryerson	Robert E. Hurley	6 f	1:10.73	$48,060	B/T
2007	Wollaston Bay	3	Shaun Bridgmohan	Gary Sciacca	One Pond Stable	6 f	1:10.75	$42,042	B/T
2006	Like Now	3	Fernando Jara	Kiaran McLaughlin	John J. Dillon	6 f	1:11.80	$41,457	B/T
2005	Distinctive Trick	3	Stewart Elliott	Uriah St. Lewis	Uriah St. Lewis	6 f	1:10.96	$48,330	L/R
2004	Quick Action	3	Heberto Castillo Jr.	D. Wayne Lukas	Overbrook Farm	6 f	1:13.92	$48,735	L/R
2003	Alysweep	3	Richard Migliore	Patrick L. Reynolds	Michael Dubb	6 f	1:11.30	$47,880	L/R
2002	Spin Zone	3	Javier Castellano	Benjamin W. Perkins Jr.	Char-Mari Stable (Charles & Marianne Hesse)	6 f	1:10.31	$47,790	L/R
2001	Forest Heir	3	Joe Bravo	Benjamin W. Perkins, Jr.	New Farm (Everette & Nancy Novak)	6 f	1:10.91	$48,690	L/R
2000	Max's Pal	3	Dale Beckner	Ben W. Perkins, Jr.	Raymond Dweck	6 f	1:11.60	$48,645	L/R
1999	Sweep Well	3	Dale Beckner	Walter C. Reese	Noreen Carpenito	6 f	1:11.40	$32,400	L/R
1998	Dr J	3	Herb McCauley	Joseph Aquilino	Paraneck Stable (Ernie Paragallo)	6 f	1:10.20	$33,450	L/R
1997	American Champ	3	Richard Migliore	Robert W. Camac	Arthur I. Appleton	6 f	1:10.20	$33,810	L/R
1996	Pirate Performer	3	Dale Cordova	Joseph Aquilino	Paraneck Stable (Ernie Paragallo)	6 f	1:11.80	$33,000	L/R
1995	Angle of Pursuit	3	Richard Migliore	John C. Kimmel	Hilmer C. Schmidt	6 f	1:13.80	$32,340	L/R
1994	Daunting Era	3	Edgar Prado	Bruce Johnstone	Milton Ritzenberg	6 f	1:11.00	$32,700	L/R
1993	Lazy Luke	3	Chris Antley	Robert W. Camac	Someday Farm (Roy & Patricia Chapman)	6 f	1:11.20	$50,040	L/R
1992	Dixie Brass	3	Rafael Mojica	Dennis J. Brida	Michael Watral	6 f	1:10.40	$53,640	L/R
1991	Mineral Ice	3	Jorge Chavez	Carlos F. Martin	Marion W. Lewis	6 f	1:10.60	$51,300	L/R
1990	Stalker	3	Jacinto Vasquez	Ben W. Perkins, Jr.	Anthony F. Tornetta	6 f	1:10.60	$53,460	L/R
1989	Electric Flash	3	Eddie Maple	Jack Van Berg	Helen C. Alexander	6 f	1:11.00	$52,380	G3
1988	Aloha Prospector	3	Randy Romero	Edwin J. Gregson	Jeff Siegel	6 f	1:10.40	$82,980	G3
1987	Why Not Try	3	Angel Cordero Jr.	Richard E. Dutrow Sr.	Henry Waring	6 f	1:10.60	$52,560	G3
1986	Landing Plot	3	J. C. Estrada	Harry B. Wendel	Triad Stables	6 f	1:11.80	$52,290	G3
1985	King Babar	3	Michael Morgan	Pamela Sinn	Rosebud Farm	6 f	1:10.00	$52,200	G3
1984	The Wedding Guest	3	Angel Cordero Jr.	Leroy Jolley Jr.	Charles E. Harris III	6 f	1:12.60	$66,420	G3
1983	Chas Conerly	3	Octavio Vergara	Mervin Marks	Daniel Lavezzo Jr.	6 f	1:10.20	$33,360	G3
1982	Shimatoree	3	Mario G. Pino	Richard E. Dutrow Sr.	Rif'at Hussain	6 f	1:09.40	$32,820	G3
1981	Proud Appeal	3	Jeffrey Fell	Stanley M. Hough	Malcomn H. Winfield	6 f	1:11.40	$33,060	G3
1980	Current Legend	3	Cash Asmussen	John P. Campo	Buckland Farm	6 f	1:10.60	$33,000	G3
1979	Screen King	3	Ruben Hernandez	Luis S. Barrera	Flying Zee Stable (Carl Lizza)	6 f	1:10.60	$32,130	G3
1978	Piece Of Heaven	3	Ruben Hernandez	Frank (Pancho) Martin	Sigmund Sommer	6 f	1:11.20	$32,160	G3
1977	Hunch	3	Leroy Moyers	Anthony J. Lombardi	Susan B. Fisher	6 f	1:09.60	$32,310	G3
1976	National Flag	3	Jorge Velasquez	John P. Campo	Elmendorf Farm	6 f	1:09.60	$33,300	G3
1975	Singh	3	Angel Cordero Jr.	John W. Russell	Cynthia Phipps	6 f	1:09.80	$34,860	G3
1974	Noble Michael	3	Vincent Bracciale Jr.	Daniel Perlsweig	Edgehill Farm	6 f	1:10.00	$33,990	G3
1973	Champagne Charlie	3	Mike Venezia	Woodrow Sedlacek	Jacques D. Wimpfheimer	6 f	1:11.80	$17,055	G3

== Earlier winners ==
- 1972 – Explodent
- 1971 – Good Behaving
- 1970 – Sunny Tim
- 1970 – Tom Nix
- 1969 – Reviewer
- 1968 – Clever Foot
- 1967 – Solo Landing
- 1966 – Impressive
- 1965 – Dependability
- 1964 – Black Mountain
- 1963 – Ahoy
- 1962 – Green Ticket
- 1961 – Merry Ruler
- 1960 – Warfare
- 1959 – Atoll
- 1958 – Hubcap
- 1957 – King Hairan
- 1956 – Son of Erin
- 1955 – Nance's Lad
- 1954 – Gigantic
- 1953 – Tahitian King
- 1952 – Charlie McAdam
- 1952 – Sky Ship
- 1951 – Jumbo
- 1950 – Ferd
- 1949 – Blue Lancer
- 1948 – Coaltown
- 1947 – Owners Choice
- 1946 – Master Bid
- 1944 – Boy Knight
- 1943 – Slide Rule
- 1942 – Bright Willie
- 1941 – Omission
- 1940 – Parasang
- 1939 – Sea Captain
- 1938 – Chaps
- 1937 – Black Look
- 1936 – Mr. Bones
- 1935 – Mantagna
- 1934 – Roustabout
- 1933 – Sation
- 1932 – Flag Pole
- 1931 – Morstone
- 1930 – Polygamous
- 1929 – Chestnut Oak
- 1928 – Polydor
- 1927 – Cheops
- 1910 – Ocean Bound
- 1909 – Fashion Plate
- 1908 – King Cobalt
- 1907 – Baby Wolf
- 1906 – Halifax
- 1905 – Oiseau
- 1904 – Stalwart
- 1903 – River Pirate
- 1902 – Hatasoo
- 1901 – Watercolor
- 1900 – Contestor
- 1899 – Fly By Night
- 1898 – Hamburg
- 1897 – Elkins
- 1896 – Requital
- 1895 – Liza
- 1894 – Discount
- 1893 – Ajax
- 1892 – Vestibule
- 1891 – La Tosca
- 1890 – Reclare
- 1889 – Blue Rock
- 1888 – Emperor of Norfolk
- 1887 – Hanover
- 1886 – Walter H.
- 1885 – Brookwood
