= Merry Ruler =

British-bred Thoroughbred racehorse

- Sire: Grey Sovereign
- Grandsire: Nasrullah
- Dam: Queen of Song
- Damsire: King Salmon
- Sex: Gelding
- Foaled: 1958
- Country: Great Britain
- Colour: Brown
- Breeder: A. S. Smith
- Owner: Harry Freylinghuysen
- Trainer: Edward J. Yowell
- Record: 64: 20-8-15
- Earnings: US$293,348

Major wins
- Bay Shore Handicap (1961); Ventnor Turf Handicap (1961); Swift Stakes (1961); Carter Handicap (1962); Gravesend Handicap (1962); Toboggan Handicap (1962); Rumson Handicap (1963); Sport Page Handicap (1963)

Merry Ruler (foaled 1958 in England) was a Thoroughbred racehorse who competed successfully in the United States. A great grandson of the very important sire, Nearco, he was raced by Harry Freylinghuysen, owner of Merrybrook Farm in Far Hills, New Jersey.

Trained by Eddie Yowel, Merry Ruler competed for three years, winning major races at tracks in New Jersey and New York. In May 1962 he equaled the Aqueduct track record in winning the Carter Handicap then in July set a new track record while winning the Gravesend Handicap.
