= Sport Page Handicap =

- Class: Discontinued stakes
- Location: Aqueduct Racetrack; Queens, New York, United States
- Inaugurated: 1953
- Race type: Thoroughbred – Flat racing
- Website: Aqueduct Racetrack at NYRA

Race information
- Distance: 7 furlong sprint
- Surface: Dirt
- Track: Left-handed
- Qualification: Three-year-olds & up
- Weight: Assigned
- Purse: $150,000 added

The Sport Page Handicap was an American thoroughbred horse race run annually at Aqueduct Race Track in Ozone Park, Queens, New York for three-year-olds and up. Formerly a Grade III event, it's set at a distance of 7 furlongs on the dirt and offers a purse of $150,000 added.

The Sport Page is named in honor of the horse who won the East View Stakes at Jamaica, New York in 1948.

Run at Jamaica prior to 1959; at Belmont Park in 1968, 1971, 1995, 2001 and 2003, this race has been run at Aqueduct in all other years.

Open to all ages prior to 1959, and run at the distance of six furlongs from 1953 to 1993, then at seven furlongs from 1994 to 2000.

Due to the troubled economy in 2008, the Sport Page was canceled by the NYRA as they adjusted races to meet the new Grade I standard purse of $300,000. The race was not eligible for grading in 2011.

== Past winners ==
- 2008 – Kodiak Kowboy (Gabriel Saez)
- 2007 – Tasteyville (Mike Luzzi)
- 2006 – Silver Wagon (Joe Bravo)
- 2005 – Gotaghostofachance (Jon Court)
- 2004 – Mass Media (Javier Castellano)
- 2003 – Voodoo (Jorge F. Chavez)
- 2002 – Multiple Choice (Victor Carrero)
- 2001 – Yonaguska (Chris McCarron)
- 2000 – Stalwart Member (Norberto Arroyo Jr.)
- 1999 – Scatmandu (Aaron Gryder)
- 1998 – Stormin Fever (Richard Migliore)
- 1997 – Stalwart Member (Aaron Gryder)
- 1996 – Valid Expectations (Cash Asmussen)
- 1995 – Siphon (Kent Desormeaux)
- 1994 – Man's Hero (Mike Luzzi)
- 1993 – Boom Towner (Frank Lovato Jr.)
- 1992 – R.D. Wild Whirl (Robbie Davis)
- 1991 – Senor Speedy (Jorge F. Chavez)
- 1990 – Senor Speedy (Angel Santiago)
- 1989 – Garemma (Jorge F. Chavez)
- 1988 – High Brite (Ángel Cordero Jr.)
- 1987 – Vinnie The Viper (Julie Krone)
- 1986 – Best By Test (Frank Lovato Jr.)
- 1985 – Raja's Shark (Ángel Cordero Jr.)
- 1984 – Tarantara (Richard Migliore)
- 1983 – Fast As the Breeze (Melvin Toro)
- 1982 – Maudlin (Jerry D. Bailey)
- 1981 – Well Decorated (Ruben Hernandez)
- 1980 – Dave's Friend (Vince Bracciale Jr.)
- 1979 – Amadevil (Herb McCauley)
- 1978 – Topsider (Michael Venezia)
- 1977 – Affiliate (Ángel Cordero Jr.)
- 1976 – Amerrico (Sandy Hawley)
- 1975 – Lonetree (Eddie Maple)
- 1974 – Startahemp (Jorge Velásquez)
- 1973 – Timeless Moment (Braulio Baeza)
- 1972 – Petrograd (Eddie Maple)
- 1971 – Lonesome River (Robert Woodhouse)
- 1970 – Fresh N' Foolish (Jorge Velásquez)
- 1969 – King Emperor (Braulio Baeza)
- 1968 – Kissin' George (Braulio Baeza)
- 1967 – R. Thomas (Eddie Belmonte) †
- 1967 – Sun Gala (Laffit Pincay Jr.) †
- 1966 – Impressive (Ron Turcotte)
- 1965 – Ornamento (William Boland)
- 1964 – Affectionately (Bill Shoemaker)
- 1963 – Merry Ruler (Johnny Sellers)
- 1962 – Misty Day (William Boland)
- 1961 – Intentionally (Manuel Ycaza)
- 1960 – April Skies (J. Leonard)
- 1959 – Ole Fols (William Boland)
- 1958 – Nahodah (Joe Culmone)
- 1957 – Tick Tock (Bobby Ussery)
- 1956 – Joe Jones (Conn McCreary)
- 1955 – Squared Away (Eddie Arcaro)
- 1954 – Joe Jones (Conn McCreary)
- 1953 – White Skies (James Stout)
- † There was a dead heat in 1967.
