= Herb McCauley =

American jockey

Personal information
- Born: May 2, 1957 (age 69) Durham, North Carolina, U.S.
- Occupation: Jockey

Horse racing career
- Sport: Horse racing
- Career wins: 3,000+

Major racing wins
- Oceanport Stakes (1978); Sport Page Breeders' Cup Handicap (1979); Matron Stakes (1982); Haskell Invitational Handicap (1983); Salvator Mile (1984); Monmouth Breeders' Cup Oaks (1985, 1986); Ben Ali Handicap (1986); Florida Oaks (1986, 1990); Royal Palm Handicap (1986); Blue Grass Stakes (1987); Lexington Stakes (1987); Red Bank Handicap (1988); Aqueduct Handicap (1989); Bowling Green Handicap (1989); Sword Dancer Invitational Handicap (1989); La Prevoyante Handicap (1990); Flower Bowl Invitational Stakes (1990); Washington Park Handicap (1990); Yellow Ribbon Stakes (1990); Ashley T. Cole Handicap (1991); Count Fleet Stakes (1991, 1992); Hollie Hughes Handicap (1991, 1997); Man o' War Stakes (1991, 1992); Turf Classic Handicap (1991); Beldame Stakes (1992); Bison City Stakes (1992); Canadian Oaks (1992, 1995); Cowdin Stakes (1992); Diana Handicap (1992); Gazelle Stakes (1992); Gotham Stakes (1992); Hudson Stakes (NYB) (1992); Jim Dandy Stakes (1992); Travers Stakes (1992); Gulfstream Park Handicap (1993); Ladies Handicap (1993); Nashua Stakes (1993); Pennsylvania Derby (1993); Pimlico Special (1993); Suburban Handicap (1993); Super Derby (1993); Amsterdam Stakes (1994); Black Helen Handicap (1994, 1997); Gallant Bloom Handicap (1994); Stuyvesant Handicap (1994); Kentucky Oaks (1995); Flamingo Stakes (1995); Long Branch Breeders' Cup Stakes (1995); Matchmaker Stakes (1995); E. P. Taylor Stakes (1996); Forego Handicap (1997); Molly Pitcher Handicap (1997); Jersey Shore Breeders' Cup Stakes (1998); Toboggan Handicap (1998)

Significant horses
- Deputed Testimony, Thunder Rumble; Wallenda, Devil His Due

W. Herbert McCauley (born May 2, 1957, in Durham, North Carolina) is an American Thoroughbred horse racing jockey who has been called "one of the most talented and aggressive riders of his generation" by John Piesen, an odds-maker for the New York Post and the Daily Racing Form.

While still a small boy, Herb McCauley began riding horses on his grandfather's farm. At age sixteen, he embarked on a career in Thoroughbred racing, breaking yearlings at William L. McKnight's Tartan Farms near Ocala, Florida. Within two years, McCauley moved north where he began his riding career at Monmouth Park Racetrack in New Jersey. In October 1975 he rode the first of his more than three thousand career winners at Keystone Racetrack in Philadelphia. For the next twenty-three years McCauley was a top jockey at tracks in the U.S. northeast and notably rode five winners from five mounts in a single racecard on November 18, 1985, at Meadowlands Racetrack in East Rutherford, New Jersey.

On July 10, 1998, Herb McCauley suffered compound fractures to the tibia and fibula of his left leg in an accident at Monmouth Park. The injury resulted in him undergoing four surgical proceedings followed by a lengthy rehabilitation process. With his career in ruins, McCauley's personal life suffered and he turned to alcohol in a misguided effort to cope. Having suffering from bulimia since his teens, in a May 1999 conference on the various disorders some athletes have to deal with, McCauley spoke publicly for the first time about his battle as a jockey to maintain riding weight that resulted in constant binging and purging.

Unable to ride, for a time McCauley served as an agent for jockeys but more than eight years after being sidelined he decided to attempt a comeback. Following an intense training program, in September 2007 he returned to riding competitively and a few weeks later earned his first win in nine years at Meadowlands Racetrack.

In 2007, Herb McCauley was nominated for induction in the National Museum of Racing and Hall of Fame.
