= Diane Nelson (jockey) =

American jockey and model

Personal information
- Other names: Diane Bissett
- Born: September 26, 1965 Rockville Centre, New York
- Died: July 5, 2017 (aged 51) Goshen, Connecticut
- Occupations: Jockey and model
- Height: 5 ft 6 in (168 cm)
- Weight: 110 lb (50 kg; 7 st 12 lb)
- Spouse: Robert Nelson (married 1987-1989)

Horse racing career
- Sport: Horse racing
- Career winnings: $19,106,392
- Career wins: 1,095

Honours
- Suffolk Sports Hall of Fame

Diane J. Bissett Nelson (September 26, 1965 – July 5, 2017) was an American jockey and model. Over the course of a racing career that would last 21 years, Nelson would have 1,095 race wins and her rides would earn nearly $20,000,000. Nelson was the sixth woman in the United States to record more than 1,000 race wins.

== Biography ==
=== Early life ===
Nelson was a native of New York and grew up on Long Island. She was born in Rockville Centre, and raised in Holtsville, on her father James J. Bissett Jr.'s plant nursery, as the youngest of six children. She would go on to graduate from Sachem High School. In her youth, she was a competitive swimmer, but stopped after receiving a horse from her parents.

She went on to pursue a career in the racing industry, moving to New Zealand to learn about breeding and where she took up galloping racehorses. She returned to the United States and moved to Ocala, Florida to work on a farm managed by Robert Nelson, a newly established racing trainer. In 1986, Diane and Robert moved to New York to continue their careers working for Dominick Imperio at Old Westbury Farm. They married at the farm on Long Island the following year.

=== Professional jockey ===
After moving from Florida, Nelson would gallop racehorses for free for trainers just for the opportunity to get a ride. On February 27, 1986, Nelson rode her first race at Aqueduct Racetrack. At the time, female jockeys were rare and just beginning to feature on American racetracks. She initially found the New York circuit too competitive for a new jockey, so she and Robert moved operations to New England. There, Nelson began to attract national attention while riding as an apprentice jockey at New Hampshire's Rockingham Park. In 1987 she recorded 209 race wins at Rockingham Park and Suffolk Downs, becoming the country's leading apprentice rider and second-leading female rider. While racing in New Hampshire, Nelson had a serious accident and broke her vertebrae, putting her out of commission for three months to recover. It would be the first of several back injuries to haunt her racing career.

After becoming a leading rider in New England, Nelson returned to New York where she soon became a fixture as one of the few female jockeys competing on he New York circuit. After appearing in a racing advertisement, Nelson was discovered by a modelling agent and signed with Ford Modeling Agency. Nelson was considered tall for a jockey at 5'6'', but her height suited her for modelling. Nelson preferred racing over modeling, later quitting when she found her modeling roles got in the way of racing.

=== Challenges and later career ===
As a woman jockey, Nelson would face a number of hardships and biases at the track. While Nelson was riding, few female jockeys were riding at American racetracks. Nelson and her husband Robert divorced in the winter of 1988–1989. In the early 1990s, trainer Dominick Imperio, whom the Nelsons had worked for and whom had encouraged Nelson to pursue her racing license, fell on financial difficulties. In 1992 he was indicted for money laundering and suspected ties to organized crime. Old Westbury Farm was acquired by the government and sold.

In 1996, Nelson suffered an additional tragedy when she discovered the body of racing trainer John J. Lenzini Jr. when she went to ride his horses. Lenzini Jr., who was also Nelson's boyfriend at the time, and whom also trained horses for Nelson's parents, died under mysterious circumstances at age 49.

In 1999, Nelson rode Flippy Diane to a win at the $100,000 Maryland Million Distaff Handicap. Flippy Diane was trained by Nelson's friend Leah Gyarmati. It would be the first time an all-female team of a trainer and a jockey would win a stakes race in the United States. Nelson, Gyarmati and Nelson's father James Bissett Jr. would have further success racing and claiming horses. That year, Julie Krone, the most successful female jockey in the United States and one of Nelson's inspirations retired from the sport. Krone's departure resulted in an even slimmer field of female jockeys.

In 2000, Nelson was inducted into the Suffolk Sports Hall of Fame. In 2001, she described the difficulties faced by women jockeys, “It is a shame that in this day and age, there are not more girls making it at the top level. But it is just such a struggle to get there.”

In 2006, Nelson would have to take time out of racing to have back surgery. At the time she stressed that at age 40, she was not ready for retirement.

=== Retirement and legacy ===
In 2007, after 21 years as a professional jockey Nelson retired from racing after suffering repeated back problems. She rode her final race at Aqueduct on January 20, 2007. Nelson would end her professional racing career with 1,095 wins from 9,905 mounts. She became the sixth female jockey in the United States to record over 1,000 wins. In all, her horses would win $19,106,392. In her career she would win eight graded stakes races.

A private person, little is known about Nelson's life after racing.

On July 5, 2017, Nelson died at age 51 at home in Goshen, Connecticut.
