= Hail To All =

American-bred Thoroughbred racehorse

- Sire: Hail To Reason
- Grandsire: Turn-To
- Dam: Ellen's Best
- Damsire: War Relic
- Sex: Stallion
- Foaled: May 22, 1962
- Country: United States
- Colour: Bay
- Breeder: Zelda Cohen
- Owner: Zelda Cohen
- Trainer: Edward J. Yowell
- Record: 28: 8-7-8
- Earnings: $494,150

Major wins
- Jersey Derby (1965); Travers Stakes (1965); Hibiscus Stakes (1965); U. S. Triple Crown wins: Belmont Stakes (1965)

Hail To All (foaled 1962) was an American thoroughbred racehorse which won the 1965 Belmont Stakes.

== Background ==
Hail to All was a bay horse bred at Styles Colwill's Halcyon Farm in Maryland. He was sired by Hail To Reason, out of the mare Ellen's Best, who was in turn sired by War Relic. The colt was trained by Eddie Yowell.

== Racing career ==
Hail To All placed second in the Florida Derby, Wood Memorial, Fountain of Youth Stakes, and Pimlico Futurity Stakes.

In the Kentucky Derby, he got a slow start and placed fifth. Two weeks later, he placed third in the Preakness Stakes. In the 1965 Belmont Stakes, he started third favourite and was ridden by Johnny Sellers. He produced a sustained run in the straight to win by a neck from Tom Rolfe and the outsider First Family. After the race, Sellers said that "everything went perfect today... he ran a terrific race."

In a racing career of 28 starts, he was in the money 23 times.
