= Chuck C. Lopez =

American jockey

Chuck Lopez
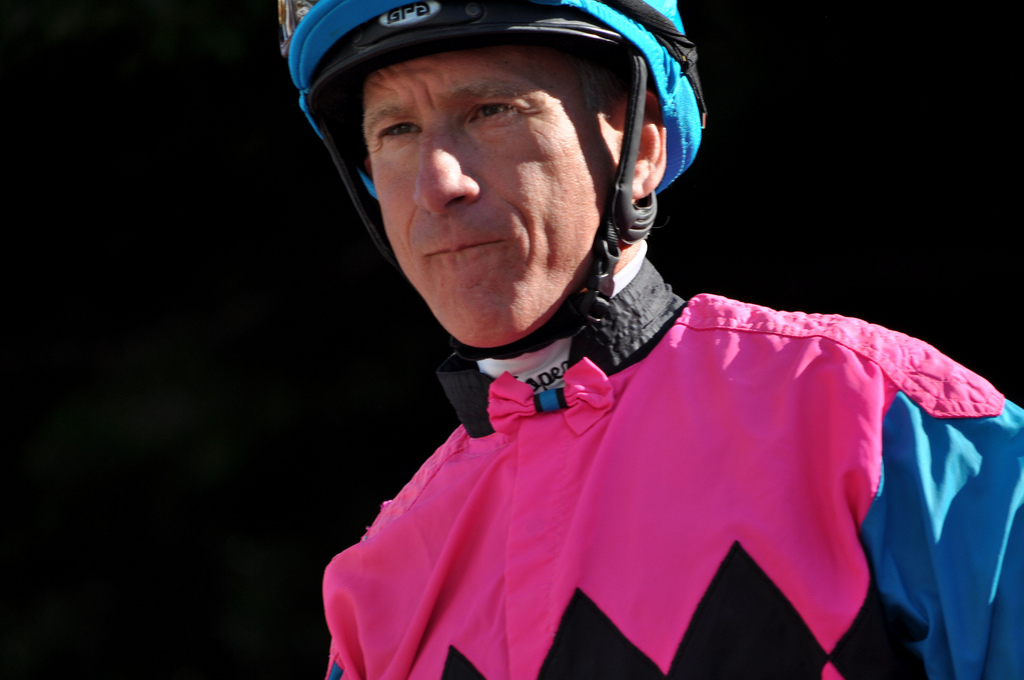
- Lopez in 2011

Personal information
- Born: August 4, 1960 (age 65) Brooklyn, New York
- Occupation: Jockey

Horse racing career
- Sport: Horse racing
- Career wins: 3,500+ (ongoing)

Major racing wins
- Lamplighter Handicap (1994); Miss Woodford Stakes (1995); Jerome Handicap (1996); Excelsior Handicap (1997, 2003, 2008); Gallant Fox Handicap (1997, 1998, 2001); Morven Stakes (1997); Hollie Hughes Handicap (1998); Sorority Stakes (1998); Stymie Handicap (1998); Bed O' Roses Handicap (2000); Oceanport Stakes (2001); Sapling Stakes (2002); Rumson Stakes (2003); Jersey Derby (2004); Molly Pitcher Stakes (2004); Longfellow Stakes (2007); Philip H. Iselin Stakes (2007, 2014); Holy Bull Stakes (2008); Red Smith Handicap (2008); General George Handicap (2009); Jaipur Stakes (2010); Toboggan Handicap (2014); Jerome Stakes (2015); Gotham Stakes (2015)

Racing awards
- Leading rider at Meadowlands Racetrack (1979, 2003); Leading rider at Monmouth Park (1998)

Significant horses
- Gottcha Gold, El Kabeir

Charles C. Lopez (born August 4, 1960, in Brooklyn, New York) is an American jockey in Thoroughbred horse racing. Recorded as "Charles," he is the son of jockey Carlos Lopez, Sr. His own sons, Erick and David Lopez, are also jockeys.

Lopez began his professional riding career at Keystone Racetrack in Bensalem Township, Pennsylvania, where he got his first win aboard Foolish Tracy on January 15, 1979. He was the leading rider at Meadowlands Racetrack in 1979 and 2003 and at Monmouth Park Racetrack in 1998.

Chart (2000–present)	Peak position
National Earnings List for Jockeys 2000	42
National Earnings List for Jockeys 2001	37
National Earnings List for Jockeys 2002	58
National Earnings List for Jockeys 2003	49
National Earnings List for Jockeys 2004	55
National Earnings List for Jockeys 2007	43
National Earnings List for Jockeys 2008	73
National Earnings List for Jockeys 2009	49
