= Rumson Stakes =

Horse race in New Jersey, US

- Class: Ungraded stakes
- Location: Gulfstream Park; Hallandale Beach, Florida, United States
- Inaugurated: 1946
- Race type: Thoroughbred – Flat racing
- Website: www.monmouthpark.com

Race information
- Distance: 5 furlongs (0.63 mi)
- Surface: Dirt
- Track: left-handed
- Qualification: Three years old and up
- Purse: $75,000

The Rumson Stakes is an American Thoroughbred horse race held at Monmouth Park Racetrack in Oceanport, New Jersey. Currently, the race is open to horses age three and older and is contested on dirt at a distance of five furlongs. It offers a purse of $75,000.

The race is named for the community of Rumson in Monmouth County, New Jersey.

== Winners of the Rumson Stakes since 1997 ==
Year	Winner	Age	Jockey	Trainer	Owner	Dist. (Miles)	Time
2025	Silver Slugger	5	Paco Lopez	Juan Carlos Avila	Victoria's Ranch	5 F	0:57.98
2024	Dean Delivers	5	Jaime Rodriguez	Edward T. Allard	Stonehedge LLC	5 F	0:57.72
2023	Stage Left	7	Paco Lopez	David Jacobson	David Jacobson	5 F	0:57.81
2022	Feast	5	Jose C. Ferrer	Gerald Bennett	Winning Stables	5 F	0:57.47
2021	Francatelli	4	Mychel Sanchez	Cal Lynch	Cal Lynch & Maribeth Sanford	5 F	0:57.26
2019	Ray'swarrior	7	Paco Lopez	Jason Servis	Michael Dubb	5 F	0:56.62
2012	– 2018	Race not held					
2011	Zero Rate Policy	3	Carlos H. Marquez Jr.	Teresa M. Pompay	Klaravich Stables Inc. & William H. Lawrence	6 F	1:08.94
2010	Cool Bullet	3	Garrett Gomez	Steve Margolis	Winmore LLC/Robert/Lawana	6 F	1:11.50
2009	Great Love	3	Joe Bravo	John J. Robb	Morgan W. Wayson Jr.	6 F	1:08.59
2008	Indy Joe	3	Joe Bravo	Mark D. Shuman	Circle Z Stable et al.	6 F	1:09.47
2007	Cherokee Country	3	Jose Lezcano	Ramon Preciado	Victory Thoroughbreds LLC	6 F	1:09.33
2006	He's Got Grit	3	Shaun Bridgmohan	Scott Blasi	Curtis C. Green	6 F	1:09.34
2005	Who's The Cowboy	3	Eddie King	Kevin G. Sleeter	Gerald F. Sleeter	6 F	1:09.13
2004	War's Prospect	3	José C. Ferrer	William D. Anderson	W.A.R. Stable	6 F	1:08.67
2003	Gators N Bears	3	Chuck C. Lopez	Leo S. Nechamkin II	Leo S. Nechamkin II	6 F	1:08.57
2002	Our Wildcat	3	José Vélez Jr.	Edwin Thomas Broome	Edwin Thomas Broome	6 F	1:09.35
2001	Sea of Green	3	Chuck C. Lopez	Janis L. Gerace	Janis L. Gerace	6 F	1:10.29
2000	Max's Pal	3	Rick Wilson	Benjamin W. Perkins Jr.	Raymond Dweck	6 F	1:09.28
1999	Alannan	3	Heberto Castillo Jr.	John J. Tammaro Jr.	William A. Marquard	6 F	1:08.81
1998	Red Weasel	3	Tommy Turner	Gerald F. Sleeter	Kevin G. Sleeter	6 F	1:08.94
1997	Partner's Hero	3	Pat Day	D. Wayne Lukas	Horton Stable, Inc. (Willis D. Horton & family)	6 F	1:08.88
