= Walter Blum =

American jockey (1934–2024)

Personal information
- Born: September 28, 1934 Brooklyn, New York, U.S.
- Died: March 14, 2024 (aged 89) Hallandale Beach, Florida, U.S.
- Occupation: Jockey

Horse racing career
- Sport: Horse racing
- Career wins: 4382

Major racing wins
- Frizette Stakes (1954, 1965); Prioress Stakes (1956); Providence Stakes (1956, 1958); Sysonby Handicap (1956); Tremont Stakes (1957); Palm Beach Handicap (1960); Stars and Stripes Handicap (1963); Brooklyn Handicap (1964); Washington Park Handicap (1964); Woodward Stakes (1964); Whitney Handicap (1964); Belmont Futurity Stakes (1965); Metropolitan Handicap (1965, 1975); Schuylerville Stakes (1965); Test Stakes (1965); Toboggan Handicap (1965); United Nations Handicap (1965); Vagrancy Handicap (1965); Beldame Stakes (1966); Coaching Club American Oaks (1966); Fashion Stakes (1966); Queens County Handicap (1966); Maskette Stakes (1966); Mother Goose Stakes (1966); San Marcos Stakes (1966); Santa Anita Derby (1966); San Fernando Stakes (1966); San Gabriel Handicap (1967); Arlington Handicap (1968); Round Table Handicap (1968); San Carlos Handicap (1968); San Luis Obispo Handicap (1968); San Gorgonio Handicap (1969); Governor Stakes (1970); Bahamas Stakes (1973); Florida Derby (1973); Monmouth Oaks (1974); Citation Handicap (1974) American Classic Race wins: Belmont Stakes (1971)

Racing awards
- United States Champion Jockey by wins (1963, 1964); George Woolf Memorial Jockey Award (1965)

Honors
- International Jewish Sports Hall of Fame (1986); United States Racing Hall of Fame (1987)

Significant horses
- Gun Bow, Affectionately, Amberoid; Lady Pitt, Pass Catcher, Mr. Prospector
- Updated on April 8, 2007

Walter Blum (September 28, 1934 – March 14, 2024) was an American jockey who won 4,382 races in a 22-year career. Blum received the George Woolf Memorial Jockey Award for being the best jockey of 1964. He won the 1971 Belmont Stakes as the jockey of 34-1 long shot Pass Catcher, which prevented Canonero II from winning the Triple Crown. He was inducted into the International Jewish Sports Hall of Fame in 1986, and the following year into the United States Racing Hall of Fame.

== Riding career ==
Blum was born on September 28, 1934, in Brooklyn, New York to Morris and Fay (Sieger) Blum. His father was a newspaper delivery man. A horse racing fan from boyhood, in his teens Blum began working as a racetrack hot walker. Despite being blind in his right eye from the age of two, when he fell off a toy horse, in 1953 at 19 years of age he embarked on a career as a jockey, riding his first winner on July 29 at Saratoga Race Course. During the better part of his 22-year career Blum rode mainly at East Coast tracks from New England to Florida and is one of only four jockeys to ever win six races on a single card at Monmouth Park. He won the Santa Anita Derby and the Florida Derby, and almost every major stakes race on the New York circuit, including the Whitney Handicap, Frizette Stakes, Prioress Stakes, Brooklyn Handicap, Metropolitan Handicap, Test Stakes, Beldame Stakes, Coaching Club American Oaks, and the Mother Goose Stakes.

However, in the 1960s, he rode seasonally at California tracks, notably winning the 1966 Santa Anita Derby, and he also dominated Chicago's summer racing circuit at Arlington Park.

== Achievements ==
Blum won 4,382 races in a 22-year career. At the time of his retirement, only Hall of Famers Bill Shoemaker, Johnny Longden, Eddie Arcaro, and Steve Brooks had ridden more winners. On June 19, 1961, Blum rode six winners on a single racecard at Monmouth Park Racetrack.

He won more races in 1963 and 1964 than any other American jockey. In February 1965, he won the George Woolf Memorial Jockey Award for being the best jockey in 1964. He rode in the Kentucky Derby and Preakness Stakes on two occasions, his best finish a fourth in both in 1967 aboard Reason to Hail. In the 1971 Belmont Stakes, he rode 34-1 long shot Pass Catcher to a victory that denied Canonero II the Triple Crown.

His best-known mounts were Hall of Famers Affectionately and Gun Bow, with one of his most famous victories coming in the 1964 Woodward Stakes when he rode Gun Bow to a win over the legendary five-time Horse of the Year Kelso. In 1969, Blum was elected president of the Jockeys' Guild and served until 1974. He rode his last mount in 1975 then went to work as a racing official at Garden State Park and the Atlantic City racetracks. In 1978 he moved to Florida where he served as a state steward until retiring on December 30, 2004.

== Death ==
Blum died from lung cancer in Hallandale Beach, Florida, where he lived, on March 14, 2024, at the age of 89.

== Honors ==
Blum was Jewish and was inducted into the International Jewish Sports Hall of Fame in 1986, and the following year into the United States Racing Hall of Fame.

Preceded by William Boland	Jockeys' Guild President; 1969–1975	Succeeded by Mike Venezia

== Sources ==
- Walter Blum profile at the International Jewish Sports Hall of Fame website
