= Richard Migliore =

American jockey

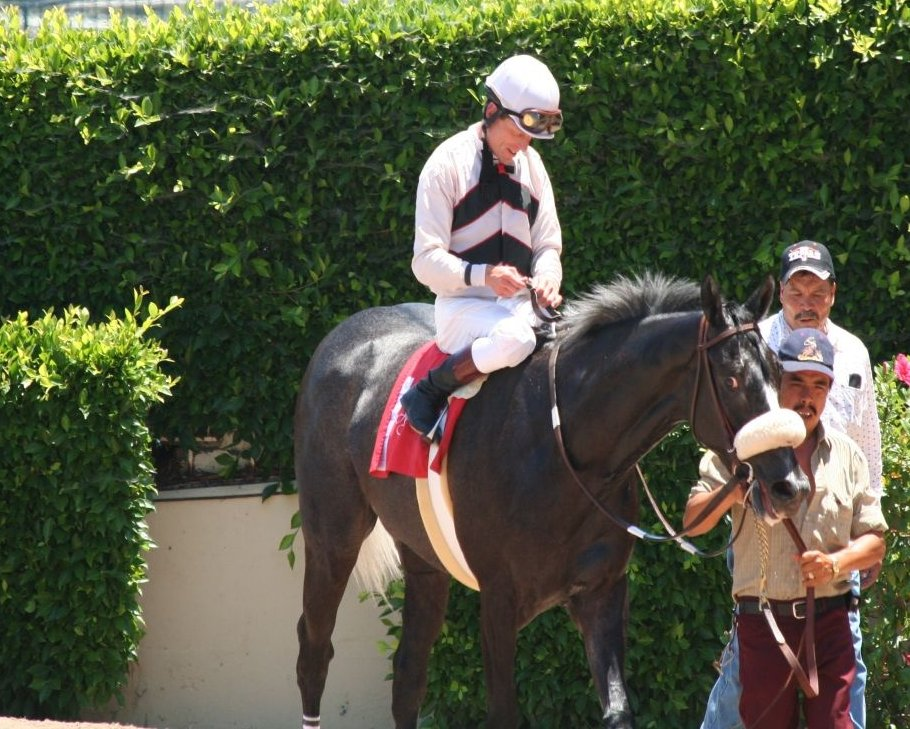

Personal information
- Born: March 14, 1964 (age 62) Babylon, New York, United States
- Occupations: Jockey, Sports analyst

Horse racing career
- Sport: Horse racing
- Career wins: 4,450

Major racing wins
- Click to view: Gallant Fox Handicap (1981); Knickerbocker Handicap (1981); Wood Memorial Stakes (1985); Whirlaway Stakes (1985, 2010); Kelso Breeders' Cup Handicap (1985); Jaipur Stakes (1986, 1996); Busher Stakes (1989); Broadway Stakes (1989, 1997, 2003); Lexington Stakes (1989, 2003); Laurel Futurity Stakes (1991); Flower Bowl Invitational Stakes (1991); Monmouth Breeders' Cup Oaks (1991); Delaware Handicap (1994); Beldame Stakes (1997, 1989); Gazelle Stakes (1989, 2009); Manhattan Handicap (1989); Iroquois Handicap (1992); Stymie Handicap (1993, 2005); Remsen Stakes (1996); Pegasus Stakes (1996); Honorable Miss Handicap (1997); Go For Wand Handicap (1997); Mike Lee Handicap (1997, 1995); Queens County Handicap (1997); Queen Elizabeth II Challenge Cup Stakes (1998); Lake George Stakes (1998); Cicada Stakes (1998); First Flight Handicap (1998); Sport Page Breeders' Cup Handicap (1998, 1984); Shadwell Turf Mile Stakes (2000); Dwyer Stakes (2000); Red Smith Handicap (2000); Commonwealth Breeders' Cup Stakes (2000); Cowdin Stakes (2000, 1998); Demoiselle Stakes (2000, 1998); Old Hat Stakes (1999); Personal Ensign Handicap (2001); Frank J. DeFrancis Memorial Dash Stakes (2002); Lake Placid Handicap (2001, 1998); Spinster Stakes (2001); General Douglas MacArthur Handicap (2001); Black-Eyed Susan Stakes (2001); Ohio Derby (2002); Saranac Stakes (2002); Sabin Stakes (2002); Grey Breeders' Cup Stakes (2002); Carter Handicap (2002); Gallant Bloom Handicap (2003, 1998, 1996); Ballerina Handicap (2003); Fourstardave Handicap (2003); Damon Runyon Stakes (2003); E. P. Taylor Stakes (2003); Stuyvesant Handicap (2003); Belmont Lexington Stakes (2003); Man o' War Stakes (2003, 1985); Vagrancy Handicap (2003, 1981); New York Stallion Series; (2003, 1998, 1996, 1993, 1985); Brooklyn Handicap (2004, 2003); Ladies Handicap (2004, 2003. 1998); Kent Breeders' Cup Stakes (2004); Florida Derby (2004); Hall of Fame (2004); Jamaica Handicap (2004, 1996, 1986); Noble Damsel Breeders' Cup Handicap (2005); Stymie Handicap (2005, 1993); Gotham Stakes (2005, 2003, 1985); Distaff Breeders' Cup Handicap; (2005, 2004, 1998, 1997); Bernard Baruch Handicap (2005, 2003, 1985); Victory Ride Stakes (2005); Dominion Day Stakes (2006); Kings Point Handicap (2006); Indiana Derby (2006); Toboggan Handicap; (2006, 2003, 2002, 1999, 1997, 1985); Fall Highweight Handicap (2006, 1997, 1987); Pacific Classic Stakes (2007); Frank E. Kilroe Mile Handicap (2007); Hawthorne Gold Cup Handicap (2007, 2008); Norfolk Stakes (United States) (2007); Baldwin Stakes (2007); Miesque Stakes (2008); Withers Stakes (2009); Test Stakes (2009); Super Derby (2009); Ruthless Stakes (2010); Breeders Cup wins: Breeders' Cup Turf Sprint (2008)

Racing awards
- Eclipse Award for Outstanding Apprentice Jockey (1981); Eddie Arcaro Award from the New York Turf Writers Association; Mike Venezia Memorial Award (2003); George Woolf Memorial Jockey Award (2008)

Significant horses
- Hidden Lake, Funny Cide, Artie Schiller, Fourstardave, Albert the Great, Kip Deville, Wando, Friends Lake, Say Florida Sandy. Student Council, Desert Code
- Updated on January 10, 2010

Richard Migliore (born March 14, 1964, in Babylon, New York) is a retired American jockey. He now works as a racing analyst for XBTV. He was nicknamed "The Mig," which is a type of Russian fighter jet, for his tenacious style of riding. He lives with his wife, Carmela, and children in Millbrook, New York.

== Early life ==
Migliore grew up in Sheepshead Bay, Brooklyn. When he was 11, his family moved into a bigger house in Bay Shore, New York. On a bike ride as a child, Migliore drove down a road that ended at a dressage horse farm called Hunting Hollow Farm, which was managed by Hugh Cassidy. Cassidy gave Migliore his first chance to work with horses and his first riding lessons. Before he was 13 years old, Migliore and a few friends bought ponies to start a pony-ride business. The pony rides turned into pony racing on the athletic fields of the Brentwood schools. They trained the ponies themselves and rode them, charging a $5 entry fee for others who raced. The day Migliore saw Willie Shoemaker win the Marlboro Cup aboard Forego on TV, he decided to be a jockey. Migliore grew to be only 5'4” and weigh 112 pounds.

== Riding career ==
Trainer Stephen A. DiMauro gave him his first job at a track and taught how to ride a race horse.

His first mount was on September 29, 1980, and his first win was less than a month later aboard Good Grip at Meadowlands Racetrack. In 1981, Migliore won the Eclipse Award as the leading apprentice jockey at the age of 17.

On May 30, 1988, Migliore suffered a near-fatal neck injury when he was thrown from Madam Alydar at Belmont Park. The accident was featured on the television series Rescue 911 on March 24, 1992, on CBS. In July 1999, he seriously fractured his right arm in another spill at Belmont and was out of the races for six months.

Two days before the Breeders' Cup run at Lone Star Park in Texas, his horse, Paulina, fell on him. He rode in the Sprint anyway, mounted on Bwana Charlie, and in the Mile on Artie Schiller. As he said, "My desire superseded my logic." Later he found he had a broken wrist, broken ribs and a broken pelvis. Sidelined for two months, he took up yoga, which he grew to love. As he says, "It even keeps my weight down."

Migliore was the recipient of the Eddie Arcaro Award from the New York Turf Writers Association as outstanding jockey in 1981 and 1985. He won the 2003 Mike Venezia Memorial Award from the New York Racing Association for "extraordinary sportsmanship and citizenship." Also that year, Migliore was honored at the 2003 Thurman Munson Awards Dinner by the Association for the Help of Retarded Children. In 2005, he again won the New York Thoroughbred Association Jockey of the Year title, riding the New York-bred winners of 58 races and winning $2,246,398.

In 2005, he won the Aqueduct Racetrack spring meet. His 4,000th career win occurred on February 4, 2005. He won twice that day, once on Hurricane Erica and the second time on Benjamin Baby. Migliore became the 18th active jockey to reach that milestone and the 43rd in U.S. history to win that many races. In October 2006, Migliore announced his move to the California tracks after a career spent on the East Coast. On November 15, he rode his first mount at Hollywood Park Racetrack. On February 23, 2008, Migliore won the George Woolf Memorial Jockey Award. In the summer of 2008, Migliore announced he would be returning to the East Coast for the Saratoga meet. At the end of the Saratoga meet, Migliore relocated to New York.

On October 25, 2008, at Santa Anita Park, Migliore won his first Breeders' Cup race, the Breeders' Cup Turf Sprint on Desert Code.

On May 4, 2010, he underwent an operation in which two plates and eight screws were inserted into his neck due to a fall from his mount, Honest Wildcat, at Aqueduct on January 23, 2010. During a press conference held at Belmont Racetrack before the draw for the Belmont Stakes in June, Migliore announced his retirement. He won 4,450 races, including 362 stakes and 25 Grade 1 events.

"It's no big surprise why we're here, my career as a jockey is over," he said. "It's not by choice. I was in the doctor's office on Wednesday of last week and he assured me that I would never ride another Thoroughbred again. He works on many NFL players and said if you have a level two fusion, you have to retire. I have a level four fusion."

== Broadcast career ==
In late 2010, shortly after retiring from the saddle, Migliore joined HRTV as an analyst where he appears on number of shows, including "Pursuit of the Cup" and "Pursuit of the Crown". He contributed reports from the Breeders' Cup, and the Triple Crown races. In 2014, Migliore joined Fox Sports 1 The Jockey Club Tour on FOX racing series as the racing analyst before moving on to the New York Racing Association, serving as broadcast analyst and racing office associate.

Migliore joined the XBTV team in 2017 and presently works as an East Coast analyst, providing handicapping insight and interviews.

== Year-end charts ==
Chart (2000–2009)	Peak position
National Earnings List for Jockeys 2000	19
National Earnings List for Jockeys 2001	14
National Earnings List for Jockeys 2002	18
National Earnings List for Jockeys 2003	16
National Earnings List for Jockeys 2004	20
National Earnings List for Jockeys 2005	27
National Earnings List for Jockeys 2006	59
National Earnings List for Jockeys 2007	26
National Earnings List for Jockeys 2008	57
National Earnings List for Jockeys 2009	88
