= Jose Lezcano =

Panamanian jockey (born 1985)

Personal information
- Born: April 20, 1985 (age 41) Panama
- Occupation: Jockey

Horse racing career
- Sport: Horse racing

Major racing wins
- Delaware Oaks (2005); Florida Oaks (2005); Tampa Bay Derby (2006); Colonial Turf Cup (2007); Rumson Stakes (2007); Sorority Stakes (2007); Cotillion Handicap (2008); Eatontown Handicap (2008); Gotham Stakes (2008); Great White Way (2008); Gulfstream Park Turf Handicap (2008); Violet Handicap (2008); Bold Ruler Handicap (2009, 2011, 2013); Carry Back Stakes (2009); Kelso Stakes (2009); Remsen Stakes (2009); Smile Sprint Handicap (2009); Appleton Handicap (2010); Black-Eyed Susan Stakes (2010); Dwyer Stakes (2010); Florida Derby (2010); Alabama Stakes (2011); Appalachian Stakes (2011); Florida Oaks (2012); Ballston Spa Handicap (2013); Jockey Club Gold Cup (2013); Pennsylvania Governor's Cup Stakes (2015); Sam F. Davis Stakes (2018); Jimmy Winkfield Stakes (2020); Hudson Stakes (NYB) (2023) Breeders' Cup wins: Breeders' Cup Juvenile Fillies Turf (2008); Breeders' Cup Ladies' Classic (2011); Breeders' Cup Mile (2013)

Racing awards
- Leading jockey at Tampa Bay Downs (2006); Leading jockey at Monmouth Park (2008); Leading jockey at Gulfstream Park (2009)

Significant horses
- Buddy's Saint, Deputy Glitters, Einstein, Ice Box, Maram, Seattle Smooth, Winter Memories, Royal Delta

Jose Lezcano (born April 20, 1985) is a Panamanian jockey in American Thoroughbred horse racing. He rides in New York in the spring, summer and fall and spends the winter in Florida. His big break came in 2008 when he won a Breeders' Cup race.

== Career ==
Lezcano attended the Laffit Pincay Jockey School in his native Panama before moving to the U.S. in January 2003 and launching his career at Gulfstream Park where he earned his first win in March 2004 aboard Cloudy Gray. He spent his first season at Monmouth in 2005, finishing fifth in the standings overall.

In 2008, Jose Lezcano won with his first and only Breeders' Cup mount, Maram, in the inaugural edition of the Breeders' Cup Juvenile Fillies Turf. The win also was a first Breeders' Cup victory for trainer Chad Brown and owners Karen Woods and Saud bin Khaled, who were all starting a Breeders' Cup runner for the first time.

Top mounts for 2009 included Eaton's Gift (G2 Smile Sprint Handicap), Not for Silver (G2 Carry Back Stakes), Cosmonaut (G3 Fort Marcy Stakes), I Lost My Choo (G3 Honey Fox Stakes), Buddy's Humor (G3 Pan American Stakes), and Ballymore Lady (G3 Endeavour Stakes).

Enjoyed a career year in 2008 which was his big break, replacing perennial leader Joe Bravo as the leading rider at Monmouth Park Racetrack with 141 wins, then taking the 2008 fall season at the Meadowlands Racetrack. He carried that momentum into the 2009 Gulfstream Park meet and also earned a leading rider title there with 71 wins. Agent Jason Beides holds his book.

Jose Lezcano tied a Monmouth Park record on June 22, 2008, riding six winners – including Coli Bear in the Blue Sparkler Stakes – on one card.

Rode Deputy Glitters, his first Triple Crown contender, to an eighth-place finish in the 2006 edition of the G1 Kentucky Derby. Was 12th aboard Visionaire in 2008. He was second in the 2010 Kentucky Derby on Ice Box.

Won the 2006 riding title at The Meadowlands and carried that success to Florida where he won the Tampa Bay Downs riding title, the same season he captured the G3 Tampa Bay Derby with Deputy Glitters.

Most recently, he rode reigning Horse of the Year Wise Dan to victory in the 2013 Breeders' Cup Mile as a mid-card replacement for the horse's regular jockey John Velazquez, who was hospitalised after a fall in the Juvenile Fillies race.

== Year-end charts ==
Chart (2005–present)	Rank by earnings
National Earnings List for Jockeys 2005	51
National Earnings List for Jockeys 2006	23
National Earnings List for Jockeys 2007	28
National Earnings List for Jockeys 2008	13
National Earnings List for Jockeys 2009	13
National Earnings List for Jockeys 2010	10
National Earnings List for Jockeys 2011	9
National Earnings List for Jockeys 2012	6
National Earnings List for Jockeys 2013	6
National Earnings List for Jockeys 2014	11
National Earnings List for Jockeys 2015	8
National Earnings List for Jockeys 2016	23
National Earnings List for Jockeys 2017	20
National Earnings List for Jockeys 2018	24
National Earnings List for Jockeys 2019	11
