= Fountain of Youth Stakes top three finishers =

This is a listing of the horses that finished in either first, second, or third place and the number of starters in the Fountain of Youth Stakes, an American Grade 2 race for three-year-olds at 1-1/8 miles on dirt held at Gulfstream Park in Hallandale Beach, Florida. (List 1973-present)

Year	Winner	Second	Third	Starters
2018	Promises Fulfilled	Strike Power	Good Magic	10
2017	Gunnevera	Practical Joke	Three Rules	10
2016	Mohaymen	Zulu	Fellowship	6
2015	Itsaknockout*	Upstart	Frammento	8
2014	Wildcat Red	General A Rod	Top Billing	12
2013	Orb	Violence	Speak Logistics	9
2012	Union Rags	News Pending	Discreet Dancer	8
2011	Soldat	Gormet Dinner	To Honor and Serve	9
2010	Eskendereya	Jackson Bend	Aikenite	10
2009	Quality Road	Theregoesjojo	Beethoven	10
2008	Cool Coal Man	Elysium Fields	Court Vision	12
2007	Scat Daddy	Stormello	Nobiz Like Shobiz	9
2006	First Samurai*	Flashy Bull	Corinthian	10
2005	High Fly	Bandini	B. B. West	9
2004	Read the Footnotes	Second of June	Silver Wagon	8
2003	Trust n Luck	Supah Blitz	Midway Cat	8
2002	Booklet	Harlan's Holiday	Blue Burner	8
2001	Songandaprayer	Outofthebox	City Zip	11
2000	High Yield	Hal's Hope	Elite Mercedes	11
1999	Vicar	Cat Thief	Certain (racehorse)	10
1998	Lil's Lad	Coronado's Quest	Halory Hunter	4
1997	Pulpit	Captain Bodgit	Blazing Sword	9
1996	Built For Pleasure	Unbridled's Song	Victory Speech	9
1995	Thunder Gulch	Suave Prospect	Jambalaya Jazz	12
1994	Dehere	Go for Gin	Ride the Rails	6
1993 #	Duc d'Sligovil	Bull In the Heather	Silver of Silver	9
1993 #	Storm Tower	Great Navigator	Kissin Kris	9
1992	Dance Floor	Pistols and Roses	Tiger Tiger	11
1991	Fly So Free	Moment of Truth	Subordinated Debt	10
1990	Shot Gun Scott	Smelly	Unbridled	13
1989	Dixieland Brass	Mercedes Won	Triple Buck	13
1988	Forty Niner	Notebook	Buoy	9
1987	Bet Twice	No More Flowers	Gone West	9
1986 #	Ensign Rhythm	Jig's Haven	Regal Dreamer	10
1986 #	My Prince Charming	Mykawa	Papal Power	10
1985	Proud Truth	Stephan's Odyssey	Do It Again Dan	14
1984	Darn That Alarm	Counterfeit Money	Swale	8
1983 #	Highland Park	Thalassocrat	Chumming	9
1983 #	Copelan	Current Hope	Blink	8
1982	Star Gallant	Distinctive Pro	Cut Away	9
1981	Akureyri	Pleasant Colony	Lord Avie	9
1980	Naked Sky	Joanie's Chief	Gold Stage	8
1979	Spectacular Bid	Lot o' Gold	Bishop's Choice	6
1978	Sensitive Prince	Believe It	Kissing U	11
1977	Ruthies Native	Steve's Friend	Fort Prevel	15
1976	Sonkisser	Proud Birdie	Archie Beamish	7
1975	Greek Answer	Decipher	Gatch	8
1974	Green Gambados	Judger	Eric's Champ	15
1973	Shecky Greene	Twice a Prince	My Gallant	6

A # designates that the race was run in two divisions in 1993, 1986 and 1983. A * designates the horse was official winner due to a DQ of apparent winner.
