= T O Elvis =

American-bred Thoroughbred racehorse

T O Elvis テーオーエルビス
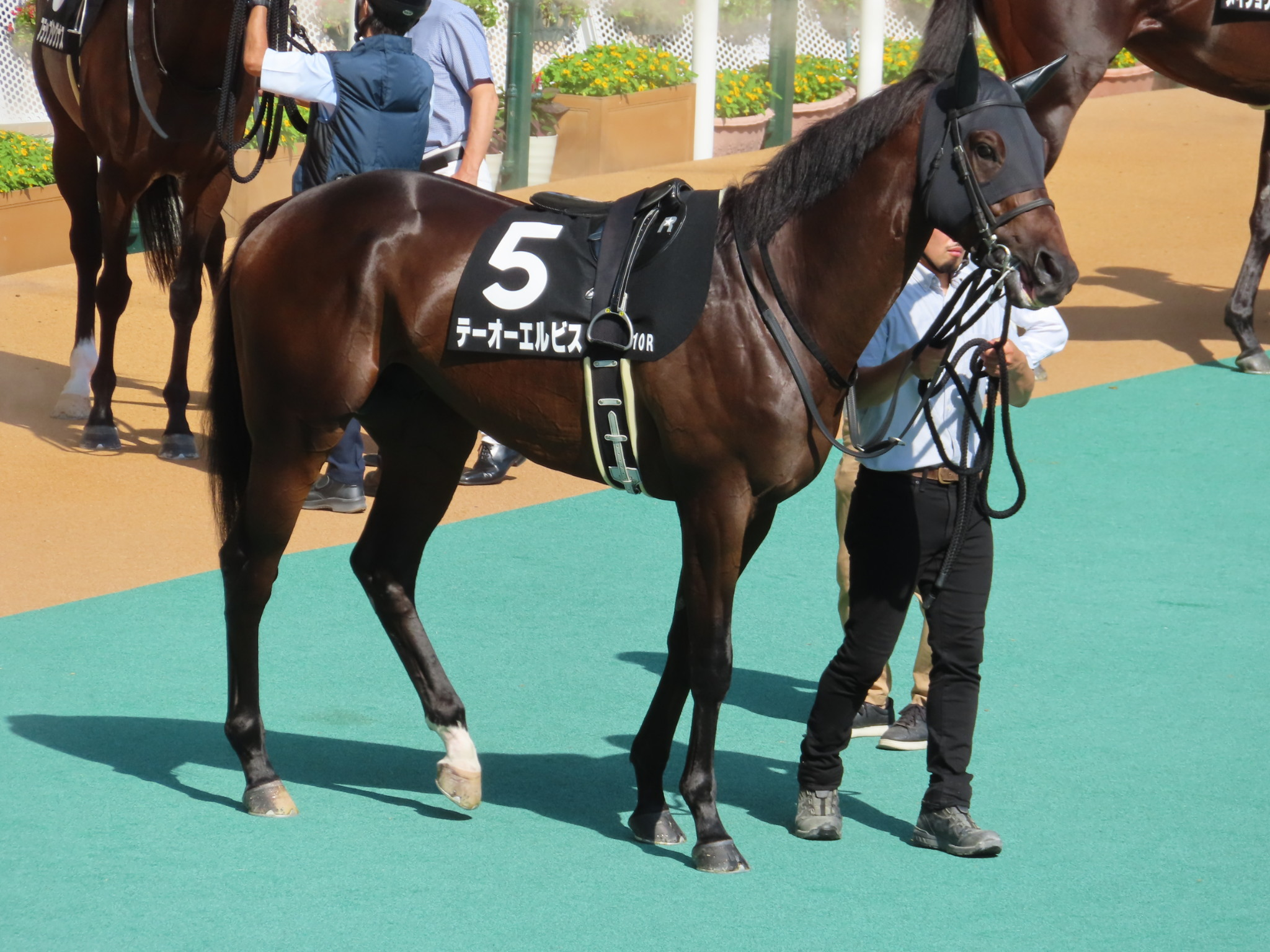
- T O Elvis at Hanshin Racecourse in 2025
- Breed: Thoroughbred
- Sire: Volatile
- Grandsire: Violence
- Dam: Stopshoppingdebbie
- Damsire: Curlin
- Sex: Colt
- Foaled: February 14, 2022 (age 4)
- Country: United States
- Color: Dark Bay
- Breeder: Jeff Prunzik & Melissa Prunzik
- Owner: Tomoya Ozasa
- Racing colours
- Trainer: Daisuke Takayanagi
- Jockey: Katsuma Sameshima; Ryusei Sakai
- Record: 10: 7-0-3
- Earnings: 344,856,100 JPY (Note: Earnings earned overseas are converted to JPY using the formula provided by JRA.); JPN: 94,397,000 JPY; USA: 1,542,200 USD

Major wins
- Capella Stakes (2025); Churchill Downs Stakes (2026); Breeders' Cup wins: Breeders' Cup Sprint (2026)
- Last updated on October 31, 2026

T O Elvis (Japanese: テーオーエルビス, Hepburn: Tēō Erubisu; foaled February 14, 2022) is an American-bred, Japanese-trained Thoroughbred racehorse. He is best known for winning the 2026 Breeders' Cup Sprint, and the 2026 Grade I Churchill Downs Stakes in stakes record time.

== Background ==
T O Elvis was foaled by Stopshoppingdebbie, a mare by Curlin who won nine consecutive start from her debut, but finished fifth in her first and her only graded race start, which was the L.A. Woman Stakes. T O Elvis' sire, Volatile, was also a successful racehorse who won the Alfred G. Vanderbilt Handicap in 2020 but was forced in to retirement shortly after due to a fracture in his right front cannon bone.

The horse is named after the American singer Elvis Presley, with the "T O" being the eponym (kanmei) of the owner, Tomoya Ozasa.

== Racing Career ==
=== 2024: two-year-old season ===
On September 8, T O Elvis made his debut in a 2-year-old maiden race over 1200m on turf at Chukyo with Katsuma Sameshima in the saddle. He got off to a good start and settled in fourth place during the race, making a strong charge in the final straight but ultimately losing to Panja Tower in third place. From his second race onwards, he switched to dirt, and on October 5, in a 2-year-old maiden race over 1200m on dirt at Kyoto, he took the lead from the innermost gate and pulled away from the rest of the field in the final straight to claim his first victory in his second race. In the Cattleya Stakes on November 23, he tracked the leaders from a good position and made a strong charge from the outside in the straight, but finished third to Natural Rise, ending his 2-year-old season.

=== 2025: three-year-old season ===
T O Elvis started his three-year-old season in a three-year-old allowance race over 1400 meters on dirt at Chukyo on January 12, he made a determined run from mid-pack, but narrowly lost, finishing third behind Matenro Command. He raced over the same class again, dropping back the distance to 1200 meters on dirt at Hanshin on March 30, he settled on the outside of mid-pack, saved his energy, and then pulled away in the stretch to record his second victory by five lengths over the rest of the field.

After a four-month spell, he returned to race in the Hamamatsu Tokubetsu on August 2, where he was ridden for the first time by Ryusei Sakai. In the race, he tracked from the middle before closing strongly down from the outside in the final stretch, catching the front-running Aster Ruhuna just before the finish to secure his third victory. In the Auckland Thoroughbred Racing Trophy on September 7, he raced just behind the leaders, took the lead with 200 meters remaining in the stretch, and drew away to win decisively by four lengths, earning promotion to open-class company.

In his first attempt at a graded stakes race, the Capella Stakes on December 14, Katsuma Sameshima returned to ride him for the first time in three starts, and he was sent off as the favorite to win the race. He settled on the inside in mid-pack during the race, was angled to the outside in the stretch, and surged into the lead before drawing away to win decisively by five lengths. The victory was his fourth in succession and gave him his first graded stakes title.

After the race, on December 25, his trainer Takayanagi revealed that he would be prepared with either the Riyadh Dirt Sprint or the Dubai Golden Shaheen under consideration as his next start.

=== 2026: four-year-old season ===
T O Elvis was invited to the Dubai Golden Shaheen, scheduled for March 28, as his first start of the season, and preparations were underway for the race. However, due to the worsening situation in the Middle East, his connections abandoned the Dubai expedition and switched his target to the Tokyo Sprint on April 15. Later, partly out of a desire to give him experience racing overseas, it was decided that he would instead head to the Churchill Downs Stakes, held at Churchill Downs on May 2, Kentucky Derby Day. Wonder Dean, a stablemate who had won the UAE Derby, had also been scheduled to run in the Kentucky Derby on the same day.

On May 2, he ran in the Churchill Downs Stakes with Ryusei Sakai aboard. In the race, he tracked from the outside of the mid-pack before turning into the stretch, where he burst clear impressively to win by 3 1/4 lengths over Disruptor. The victory extended his winning streak to five and gave him his first Grade 1 title in his first attempt at a Grade 1 race.

After the race, his owners had considered sending him to Royal Ascot in June. However, following his performance against the American opposition, the plan was revised, with the horse set to return to Japan to graze and aim for the Breeders' Cup Sprint on October 31. At the start, it did not look promising as he fell back behind the pack. T O Elvis started making his move as they approached the homestretch and unleashed a powerful turn of foot down the center of the track to overtake the leader, Englishman in the closing strides and win going away by one and a quarter lengths.

== Statistics ==
Date	Distance (Condition)	Race	Class	Course	Odds (Favourite)	Field	Finish	Time	Winning (Losing) Margin	Winner (2nd Place)	Jockey	Ref
2024 – two-year-old season
Sep 8	1200 m (Firm)	2yo Debut		Chukyo	6.90 (4)	7	3rd	1:09.8	(1/2 length)	Panja Tower	Katsuma Sameshima	
Oct 5	1200 m (Good)	2yo Maiden		Kyoto	1.60 (1)	12	1st	1:11.6	13 1/4 lengths	(Centaur Beast)	Katsuma Sameshima	
Nov 23	1600 m (Good)	Cattleya Stakes	OP	Tokyo	16.20 (7)	16	3rd	1:36.8	(2 1/2 lengths)	Natural Rise	Katsuma Sameshima	
2025 – three-year-old season
Jan 12	1400 m (Firm)	3yo Allowance	1 Win	Chukyo	2.20 (1)	16	3rd	1:24.2	(1/2 length)	Matenro Command	Katsuma Sameshima	
Mar 30	1200 m (Firm)	3yo Allowance	1 Win	Hanshin	1.30 (1)	16	1st	1:12.0	5 lengths	(Seek the Dream)	Katsuma Sameshima	
Aug 2	1200 m (Firm)	Hamamatsu Tokubetsu	2 Win	Chukyo	1.80 (1)	14	1st	1:11.2	1 length	(Aster Ruhuna)	Ryusei Sakai	
Sep 7	1200 m (Firm)	Auckland TRT	3 Win	Hanshin	1.30 (1)	12	1st	1:10.5	4 lengths	(Strength)	Ryusei Sakai	
Dec 14	1200 m (Good)	Capella Stakes	G3	Nakayama	3.20 (1)	16	1st	R1:08.6 (Note: New stakes record)	5 lengths	(Yamanin Cerchi)	Katsuma Sameshima	
2026 – four-year-old season
May 2	7 furlongs (Fast) (Note: approximately 1408 metres)	Churchill Downs Stakes	G1	Churchill Downs	5.87 (3)	11	1st	R1:20.49 (Note: New stakes record)	3 1/4 lengths	(Disruptor)	Ryusei Sakai	
Oct 31	6 furlongs (Fast) (Note: approximately 1207 metres)	Breeders' Cup Sprint	G1	Keeneland	2.79 (2)	13	1st	1:08.20	1 1/4 lengths	(Englishman)	Ryusei Sakai	

Legend:
Dirt Turf

== Pedigree ==
Pedigree of T O Elvis (USA), Dark Bay colt, 2022
Sire Volatile 2016 gr.	Violence; 2010 dk.b.	Medaglia d'Oro	El Prado
Sire Volatile 2016 gr.	Violence; 2010 dk.b.	Medaglia d'Oro	Cappucino
Sire Volatile 2016 gr.	Violence; 2010 dk.b.	Violent Beauty	Gone West
Sire Volatile 2016 gr.	Violence; 2010 dk.b.	Violent Beauty	Storming Beauty
Sire Volatile 2016 gr.	Melody Lady; 2010 gr.	Unbridled's Song	Unbridled
Sire Volatile 2016 gr.	Melody Lady; 2010 gr.	Unbridled's Song	Trolley Song
Sire Volatile 2016 gr.	Melody Lady; 2010 gr.	Lady Tak	Mutakddim
Sire Volatile 2016 gr.	Melody Lady; 2010 gr.	Lady Tak	Star of My Eye
Dam Stopshoppingdebbie 2010 dk.b.	Curlin; 2004 ch.	Smart Strike	Mr. Prospector
Dam Stopshoppingdebbie 2010 dk.b.	Curlin; 2004 ch.	Smart Strike	Classy 'n Smart
Dam Stopshoppingdebbie 2010 dk.b.	Curlin; 2004 ch.	Sherriff's Deputy	Deputy Minister
Dam Stopshoppingdebbie 2010 dk.b.	Curlin; 2004 ch.	Sherriff's Deputy	Barbarika
Dam Stopshoppingdebbie 2010 dk.b.	Taste the Passion; 1997 dk.b.	Wild Again	Icecapade
Dam Stopshoppingdebbie 2010 dk.b.	Taste the Passion; 1997 dk.b.	Wild Again	Bushel-n-Peck
Dam Stopshoppingdebbie 2010 dk.b.	Taste the Passion; 1997 dk.b.	Bisbee	Believe It
Dam Stopshoppingdebbie 2010 dk.b.	Taste the Passion; 1997 dk.b.	Bisbee	Miss Cenyak (Family: 13-e)
