= 1992 Preakness Stakes =

117th running of the Preakness Stakes thoroughbred horse race

117th Preakness Stakes
- The Preakness Stakes
- Location: Pimlico Race Course, Baltimore, Maryland, United States
- Date: May 16, 1992
- Winning horse: Pine Bluff
- Jockey: Chris McCarron
- Trainer: Thomas Bohannan
- Conditions: Fast
- Surface: Dirt

The 1992 Preakness Stakes was the 117th running of the Preakness Stakes thoroughbred horse race. The race took place on May 16, 1992, and was televised in the United States on the ABC television network. Pine Bluff, who was jockeyed by Chris McCarron, won the race by three quarters of a length over runner-up Alydeed. Approximate post time was 5:34 p.m. Eastern Time. The race was run over a fast good in a final time of 1:53-3/5. The Maryland Jockey Club reported total attendance of 96,865, this is recorded as second highest on the list of American thoroughbred racing top attended events for North America in 1992.

== Payout ==
The 117th Preakness Stakes Payout Schedule

| Program Number | Horse Name | Win | Place | Show |
|---|---|---|---|---|
| 4 | Pine Bluff | US$9.00 | $5.80 | $4.40 |
| 12 | Alydeed | - | $7.60 | $3.80 |
| 8 | Casual Lies | - | - | $4.20 |

$2 Exacta: (4–12) paid $66.80

$2 Trifecta: (4–12–8) paid $519.30

== The full chart ==
| Finish position | Margin (lengths) | Post position | Horse name | Jockey | Trainer | Owner | Post time odds | Purse earnings |
|---|---|---|---|---|---|---|---|---|
| 1st | 0 | 4 | Pine Bluff | Chris McCarron | Thomas Bohannan | Loblolly Stable | 3.50-1 favorite | $325,000 |
| 2nd | 3/4 | 12 | Alydeed | Craig Perret | Roger Attfield | Kinghaven Farms | 5.40-1 | $100,000 |
| 3rd | 2 | 8 | Casual Lies | Gary Stevens | Shelly L. Riley | Shelly L. Riley | 5.60-1 | $50,000 |
| 4th | 2 3/4 | 14 | Dance Floor | Chris Antley | D. Wayne Lukas | Oaktown Stable | 9.20-1 | $25,000 |
| 5th | 2 3/4 | 9 | Lil E. Tee | Pat Day | Lynn S. Whiting | W. Cal Partee | 4.20-1 | |
| 6th | 10 1/2 | 2 | Technology | Jerry Bailey | Hubert Hine | Scott C. Savin | 6.80-1 | |
| 7th | 12-1/4 | 1 | Agincourt | Art Madrid Jr. | Nicholas P. Zito | Robert Perez | 70.10-1 | |
| 8th | 13 1/2 | 10 | Dash For Dotty | Tommy Turner | William L. Donavan | Rainbow Stable | 42.10-1 | |
| 9th | 14 3/4 | 6 | Careful Gesture | Robert Neal Lester | Elbert R. Dixon | Cecilia Dixon | 68.00-1 | |
| 10th | 18 3/4 | 11 | Fortune's Gone | René Douglas | Angel M. Medina | Roy W. Tweed | 79.50-1 | |
| 11th | 20-1/4 | 5 | Big Sur | Mike E. Smith | D. Wayne Lukas | Overbrook Farm | 30.70-1 | |
| 12th | 20 1/2 | 7 | My Luck Runs North | Edgar Prado | Angel M. Medina | Melvin A. Benitez | 33.10-1 | |
| 13th | 22 | 3 | Conte Di Savoya | Shane Sellers | LeRoy Jolley | Jamie Carrion | 10.50-1 | |
| 14th | 23 3/4 | 13 | Speakerphone | Clarence J. Ladner | Dean Gaudet | Israel Cohen | 17.90-1 | |

- Winning Breeder: Loblolly Stable; (KY)
- Final Time: 1:55 3/5
- Track Condition: Good
- Total Attendance: 96,865

== See also ==
- 1992 Kentucky Derby
