= Nashua Stakes =

- Class: Listed
- Location: Aqueduct Racetrack; Queens, New York
- Inaugurated: 1975
- Race type: Thoroughbred – Flat racing
- Website: NYRA

Race information
- Distance: 1 mile (8 furlongs)
- Surface: Dirt
- Track: left-handed
- Qualification: Two-year-olds
- Weight: 122 lbs with allowances
- Purse: $150,000 (2021)

The Nashua Stakes is a Listed American Thoroughbred horse race for two-year-olds over a distance of one mile on the main dirt track scheduled annually in late October or early November usually at Aqueduct Racetrack in Queens, New York. The event currently offers a purse of $150,000.

== History ==
The event is named in honor of Nashua, the 1955 United States Horse of the Year. Nashua won the Dwyer Handicap at Aqueduct after he had just won the last two Classic events, the Preakness Stakes and Belmont Stakes.

The event was inaugurated on December 22, 1975, and was won by Lord Henribee, who was ridden by US Hall of Fame jockey Eddie Maple for his fourth straight win as the 2/5 odds-on favorite on a cold snowy day in a time of 1:35 4/5.

In 1982 the event was classified as Grade III and was upgraded to Grade II in 1986 for three runnings. The race returned to Grade II by the American Graded Stakes Committee in 2009 but was downgraded once more in 2018 back to Grade III.

The event was scheduled for the turf for three runnings between 1991 and 1993. The event has had several distance changes. The distance was set at a mile and 70 yards for 1985, at a mile and a sixteenth from 1987 to 1993 and six furlongs in 2011. The event was not held in 1995 and has been held at Belmont Park four times, the last of which was in 2021.

The event is late in the season and it is usually a good race for late-developing two-year-olds. There have been several notable participants who have made an impact later in their racing careers. The 1991 winner Pine Bluff went on to win the 1992 Preakness Stakes while the 1997 winner Coronado's Quest the following year won the Grade I Haskell Invitational and Grade I Travers Stakes. In 2010 To Honor and Serve led all the way to record an easy 4-length victory over Mucho Macho Man. To Honor and Serve also won two Grade Is later in his career, the Cigar Mile Handicap and Woodward Stakes while Mucho Macho Man won the Breeders' Cup Classic in 2013 as a five-year-old.

In 2023 the event was downgraded by the Thoroughbred Owners and Breeders Association to Listed status

== Records ==
Time record:

- 1 mile: 1:34:66 – Independence Hall (2019)
- 1 1/16 miles: 1:44.60 – Dalhart (1992)

Margins:

- 12 1/2 lengths - Quadratic (1977)
- 12 1/4 lengths - Independence Hall (2019)

Most wins by an owner

- 3 – Loblolly Stable (1988, 1991, 1992)

Most wins by a jockey

- 4 – Jerry D. Bailey (1990, 1998, 2001, 2003)

Most wins by a trainer

- 5 – Kiaran McLaughlin (2006, 2007, 2013, 2015, 2017)

== Winners ==
Year	Winner	Jockey	Trainer	Owner	Distance	Time	Purse	Grade	Ref
At Aqueduct
2024	Studlydoright	Xavier Perez	John J. Robb	David R. Hughes	1 mile	1:37.23	$145,500	Listed	
2023	Where's Chris	Isaac Castillo	Richard E. Dutrow Jr.	Nice Guys Stables	1 mile	1:36.75	$145,500	Listed	
2022	Champions Dream	Irad Ortiz Jr.	Danny Gargan	Rosedown Racing Stables	1 mile	1:39.17	$150,000	III	
At Belmont Park
2021	Rockefeller	Luis Saez	Bob Baffert	SF Racing, Starlight Racing, Madaket Stables, Stonestreet Stables & Robert E. Masterson	1 mile	1:36.66	$150,000	III	
At Aqueduct
2020	Pickin' Time	Trevor McCarthy	Kelly J. Breen	John Bowers, Jr.	1 mile	1:39.89	$100,000	III	
2019	Independence Hall	Jose L. Ortiz	Michael J. Trombetta	Eclipse Thoroughbreds, Twin Creek Stables, Kathleen & Robert Verratti	1 mile	1:34:66	$150,000	III	
2018	Vekoma	Manuel Franco	George Weaver	R. A. Hill Stable & Gatsas Stables	1 mile	1:36.62	$200,000	III	
2017	Avery Island	Joe Bravo	Kiaran P. McLaughlin	Godolphin Racing	1 mile	1:37.58	$200,000	II	
2016	Hemsworth	Antonio A. Gallardo	Thomas Albertrani	Godolphin Racing	1 mile	1:38.70	$190,000	II	
2015	Mohaymen	Junior Alvarado	Kiaran P. McLaughlin	Shadwell Stable	1 mile	1:36.01	$200,000	II	
2014	Blofeld	John R. Velazquez	Todd A. Pletcher	Glencrest Farm (Lessee) & JSM Equine	1 mile	1:38.89	$250,000	II	
2013	Cairo Prince	Luis Saez	Kiaran P. McLaughlin	Namcook Stables, Paul Braverman, Harvey A. Clarke & W. Craig Robertson III	1 mile	1:37.59	$250,000	II	
2012	Violence	Javier Castellano	Todd A. Pletcher	Black Rock Stables	1 mile	1:35.32	$200,000	II	
At Belmont Park
2011	Vexor	David Cohen	John C. Kimmel	Goldmark Farm	6 furlongs	1:10.71	$150,000	II	
At Aqueduct
2010	To Honor and Serve	Jose Lezcano	William I. Mott	Live Oak Racing	1 mile	1:35.86	$147,000	II	
2009	Buddy's Saint	Jose Lezcano	Bruce N. Levine	Kingfield Stables	1 mile	1:35.67	$150,000	II	
2008	Break Water Edison	Alan Garcia	John C. Kimmel	Eli Gindi	1 mile	1:35.86	$109,300	III	
2007	Etched	Alan Garcia	Kiaran P. McLaughlin	Darley Stable	1 mile	1:36.96	$105,800	III	
2006	Day Pass	Fernando Jara	Kiaran P. McLaughlin	Darley Stable	1 mile	1:36.09	$112,900	III	
At Belmont Park
2005	Bluegrass Cat	John R. Velazquez	Todd A. Pletcher	WinStar Farm	1 mile	1:38.02	$113,300	III	
At Aqueduct
2004	Rockport Harbor	Stewart Elliott	John C. Servis	Fox Hill Farms	1 mile	1:36.67	$109,500	III	
2003	Read the Footnotes	Jerry D. Bailey	Richard A. Violette Jr.	Klaravich Stables	1 mile	1:36.48	$113,100	III	
2002	Added Edge	Patrick Husbands	Mark E. Casse	Team Valor & Robert J. Wilson	1 mile	1:36.77	$109,700	III	
At Belmont Park
2001	Listen Here	Jerry D. Bailey	William I. Mott	Kim & Rodney Nardelli & Lewis G. Lakin	1 mile	1:37.61	$109,300	III	
At Aqueduct
2000	Ommadon	Aaron Gryder	Thomas M. Walsh	Sorin Stables	1 mile	1:36.74	$113,200	III	
1999	Mass Market	Mike E. Smith	Benjamin W. Perkins Jr.	New Farm	1 mile	1:38.60	$111,700	III	
1998	Doneraile Court	Jerry D. Bailey	Nicholas P. Zito	Michael Tabor & Mrs. John Magnier	1 mile	1:36.17	$111,000	III	
1997	Coronado's Quest	Mike E. Smith	Claude R. McGaughey III	Stuart S. Janney III	1 mile	1:37.06	$108,500	III	
1996	Jules	Jose A. Santos	Alan E. Goldberg	Jayeff B Stables	1 mile	1:36.89	$113,900	III	
1995	Race not held								
1994	Devious Course	Frank T. Alvarado	H. James Bond	Rudlein Stable	1 mile	1:37.50	$109,300	III	
1993	Popol's Gold	Herb McCauley	William H. Turner Jr.	Stephen Stavrides	1 1/16 miles	1:46.68	$124,000	III	
1992	Dalhart	Mike E. Smith	Thomas K. Bohannan	Loblolly Stable	1 1/16 miles	1:44.60	$124,400	III	
1991	Pine Bluff	Craig Perret	Thomas K. Bohannan	Loblolly Stable	1 1/16 miles	1:46.14	$126,600	III	
1990	Kyle's Our Man	Jerry D. Bailey	John M. Veitch	Darby Dan Farm	1 1/16 miles	1:45.40	$93,300	III	
1989	Champagneforashley	Jacinto Vasquez	Howard M. Tesher	Lions Head Farm	1 1/16 miles	1:45.20	$110,800	III	
1988	Traskwood	Angel Cordero Jr.	George R. Arnold II	Loblolly Stable	1 1/16 miles	1:45.20	$105,400	II	
1987	Cougarized	Jose A. Santos	D. Wayne Lukas	Lloyd R. French Jr.	1 1/16 miles	1:46.00	$128,600	II	
1986	Bold Summit	Chris Antley	Richard E. Dutrow Sr.	Alvin J. Akman	1 1/16 miles	1:45.00	$100,000	II	
1985	Raja's Revenge	Robbie Davis	Frank LaBoccetta	Edward Anchel	1 mile & 70 yards	1:44.40	$90,350	III	
1984	Stone White	Robbie Davis	Gilbert Puentes	Gilbert Puentes	1 mile	1:38.20	$96,750	III	
1983	Don Rickles	Angel Cordero Jr.	John Parisella	Theodore M. Sabarese	1 mile	1:38.40	$58,000	III	
1982	I Enclose	Ruben Hernandez	Edward I. Kelly Sr.	Brookfield Farms	1 mile	1:37.60	$59,100	III	
1981	Our Escapade	Donald MacBeth	Roger Laurin	Reginald N. Webster	1 mile	1:36.80	$58,800		
1980	† A Run	Chris McCarron	Larry S. Barrera	Arron U. Jones	1 mile	1:37.20	$59,100		
1979	Googolplex	Laffit Pincay Jr.	Frank "Pancho" Martin	Robert N. Lehmann	1 mile	1:36.40	$54,250		
1978	Instrument Landing	Jeffrey Fell	David A. Whiteley	Pen-Y-Bryn Farm	1 mile	1:37.00	$44,200		
1977	Quadratic	Eddie Maple	Woodford C. Stephens	August Belmont IV	1 mile	1:35.40	$36,625		
1976	Nearly On Time	Jacinto Vasquez	LeRoy Jolley	Mrs. Moody Jolley	1 mile	1:35.60	$36,675		
1975	Lord Henribee	Eddie Maple	William H. Turner Jr.	Milton Ritzenberg	1 mile	1:35.80	$55,050		

Legend:
Dirt Turf

Notes:
§ Ran as an entry
† In the 1980 running, Willow Hour was first past the post, but was disqualified and placed last for interference in the running of the race.

== See also ==
List of American and Canadian Graded races
