= Buddy's Saint =

American-bred Thoroughbred racehorse

- Sire: Saint Liam
- Grandsire: Saint Ballado
- Dam: Tuzia
- Damsire: Blushing John
- Sex: Stallion
- Foaled: 2007
- Country: United States
- Colour: Bay
- Breeder: Roy Gottlieb & Morton Fink
- Owner: Kingfield Stables (Eli Lomita)
- Trainer: Bruce N. Levine
- Record: 4: 2-1-0
- Earnings: US$218,600

Major wins
- Nashua Stakes (2009); Remsen Stakes (2009)
- Last updated on January 23, 2010

Buddy's Saint (February 23, 2007 – November 14, 2010) was an American Thoroughbred racehorse.

== Background ==
Sired by Saint Liam, a Breeders' Cup Classic winner who also won the Eclipse Award as the 2005 Horse of the Year, he is out of the mare Tuzia by Blushing John. He was sold in the 2008 Keeneland September yearling sale for $100,000.

== Racing career ==
=== 2009: Two year old campaign ===
In his first race, going 6 1/2 furlongs (4,300 ft; 1,300 m) at Belmont Park, Buddy's Saint was first to cross the wire, but was disqualified and placed second for bumping another horse in the stretch.

His next start was in the Grade 2 1 mile Nashua Stakes at Aqueduct Racetrack. Buddy's Saint outdueled odds-on favorite Tobaggon Slide and ran away with a 12-length victory under a hand ride by Jose Lezcano. His final time of 1:35 3/5 on a fast track earned a Beyer Speed Figure of 101.

Three weeks later, Buddy's Saint went off as the favorite from the 4th post in the Grade 2 1 1/8 miles (1.8 km) Remsen Stakes. Also in the race were Homeboykris, winner of the Grade 1 Champagne Stakes and Citrus Kid, winner of the Dover Stakes. Buddy's Saint passed pacesetters Homeboykris and Citrus Kid on the turn and coasted to an easy 4 3/4 lengths victory over 20-1 longshot Peppi Knows.

In December 2009, he was shipped to Gulfstream Park to prepare for his 3-year old campaign. He was considered a favorite for the 2010 Kentucky Derby.

=== 2010: Three year old campaign ===
Buddy's Saint finished ninth in the Fountain of Youth Stakes at Gulfstream Park, which was won by Eskendereya. Buddy's Saint suffered a chip in his right front ankle while training for the Florida Derby in March 2010. While training for his return to the races in November 2010, he fractured his shoulder in a morning workout at Belmont Park and was euthanized on the track.
