= Norcliffe =

Canadian-bred Thoroughbred racehorse

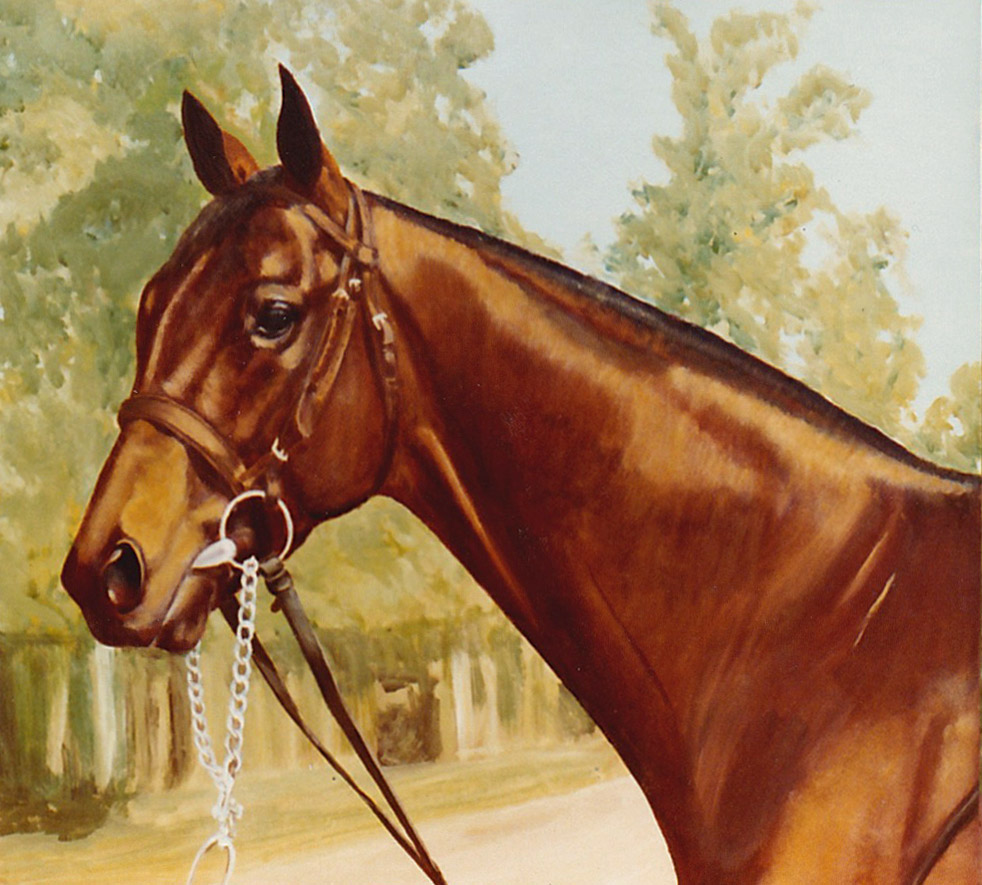
- Norcliffe, oil on canvas painted by Bob Demuyser (1920-2003)
- Sire: Buckpasser
- Grandsire: Tom Fool
- Dam: Drama School
- Damsire: Northern Dancer
- Sex: Stallion
- Foaled: 1973
- Country: Canada
- Colour: Bay
- Breeder: E. P. Taylor
- Owner: Norcliffe Stable (Charles F. Baker)
- Trainer: Roger Attfield
- Record: 33: 14-8-3
- Earnings: $434,066

Major wins
- Coronation Futurity Stakes (1975); Plate Trial Stakes (1976); Carling O'Keefe Invitational Handicap (1976, 1977); Colonel R. S. McLaughlin Handicap (1976); Canadian Maturity Stakes (1977) Canadian Triple Crown series: Queen's Plate (1976); Prince of Wales Stakes (1976)

Awards
- Canadian Champion 3-Yr-Old Colt (1976); Canadian Horse of the Year (1976); Canadian Champion Older Male Horse (1977)

Honours
- Canadian Horse Racing Hall of Fame (2005)
- Last updated on September 17, 2006

Norcliffe (1973–1984) was a Canadian Hall of Fame Thoroughbred racehorse. He was sired by U.S. Hall of Fame Champion Buckpasser out of the mare Drama School by Northern Dancer.

Owned by the Norcliffe Stable of Charles F. Baker, Chairman of the Board of the Ontario Jockey Club, Norcliffe was trained by Roger Attfield. Ridden by jockey Jeffrey Fell, Norcliffe won two of the first three legs of the 1976 Canadian Triple Crown races on dirt at Woodbine Racetrack, capturing the Queen's Plate and the Prince of Wales Stakes. The Breeders' Stakes, the final leg, is a race run on the grass course at Fort Erie Race Track and Norcliffe finished fifth. Norcliffe earned 1976 Horse of the Year honours in Canada. In 1977 he earned a Sovereign Award as top older horse and was elected to the Canadian Horse Racing Hall of Fame in 2005.

== As a sire ==
Retired to stud at the end of the 1977 racing season, Norcliffe was North America's leading juvenile sire by number of wins and second in earnings in 1981. He sired Groovy who was voted the 1987 Eclipse Award for American Champion Sprint Horse and who was a Texas State Champion twice.

Another successful son of Norcliffe was At the Threshold, a 1981 foal out of the mare Winver. She was a daughter of Vertex, a multiple winner of top level stakes and the sire of 1965 Kentucky Derby winner Lucky Debonair and 1968 U.S. Champion Two-Year-Old Colt, Top Knight. At the Threshold's wins include the Grade 1 American Derby and Arlington Classic Stakes, the Grade 2 Ohio Derby and he ran third in the 1984 Kentucky Derby. He also was the sire of 1992 Kentucky Derby winner Lil E. Tee.

== Pedigree ==
Pedigree of Norcliffe, bay stallion, 1973
Sire Buckpasser	Tom Fool	Menow	Pharamond
Sire Buckpasser	Tom Fool	Menow	Alcibiades
Sire Buckpasser	Tom Fool	Gaga	Bull Dog
Sire Buckpasser	Tom Fool	Gaga	Alpoise
Sire Buckpasser	Busanda	War Admiral	Man o' War
Sire Buckpasser	Busanda	War Admiral	Brushup
Sire Buckpasser	Busanda	Businesslike	Blue Larkspur
Sire Buckpasser	Busanda	Businesslike	La Troienne
Dam Drama School	Northern Dancer	Nearctic	Nearco
Dam Drama School	Northern Dancer	Nearctic	Lady Angela
Dam Drama School	Northern Dancer	Natalma	Native Dancer
Dam Drama School	Northern Dancer	Natalma	Almahmoud
Dam Drama School	Stalina	Stalino	Stardust
Dam Drama School	Stalina	Stalino	Inkling
Dam Drama School	Stalina	Boscabell	Fairford
Dam Drama School	Stalina	Boscabell	Hellenize (family: 10-d)
