= Alydeed =

Canadian-bred Thoroughbred racehorse

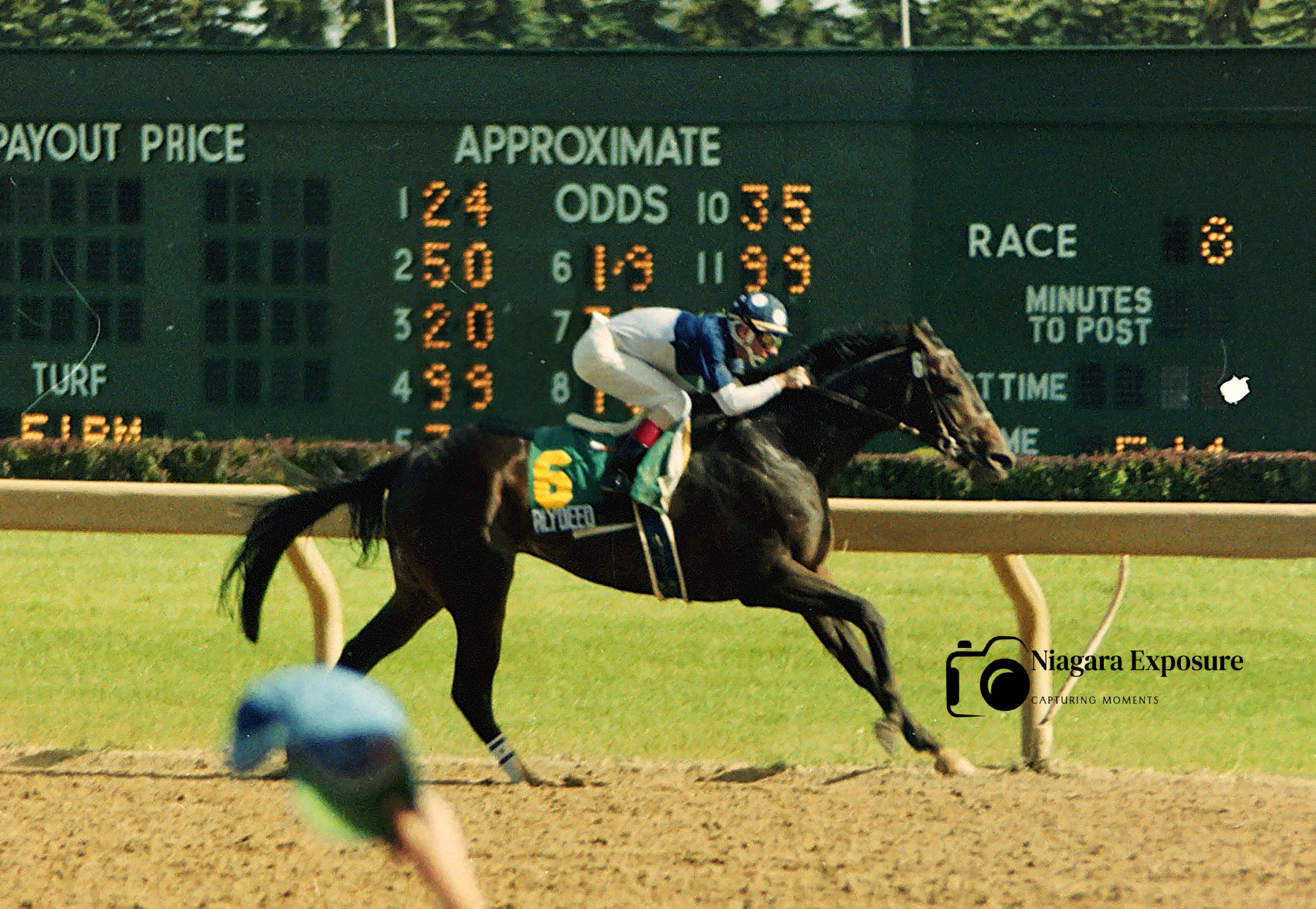
- Alydeed winning the Queen's Plate at Woodbine with jockey Craig Perret
- Sire: Shadeed
- Grandsire: Nijinsky
- Dam: Bialy
- Damsire: Alydar
- Sex: Stallion
- Foaled: 1989
- Country: Canada
- Colour: Dark Bay
- Breeder: Anderson Farms
- Owner: Kinghaven Farms
- Trainer: Roger Attfield
- Record: 15: 9-2-2
- Earnings: $930,689

Major wins
- Victoria Stakes (1991); Derby Trial (1992); Marine Stakes (1992); Plate Trial Stakes (1992); Commonwealth Breeders' Cup Stakes (1993); Carter Handicap (1993) Canadian Classic Race wins: Queen's Plate (1992) American Classic Race placing: Preakness Stakes 2nd (1992)

Honours
- Canadian Horse Racing Hall of Fame (2022)

Alydeed (foaled 1989) is a Canadian Hall of Fame Thoroughbred racehorse. Bred by Anderson Farms of St. Thomas, Ontario, he was out of the unraced mare Bialy, a daughter of U.S. Racing Hall of Fame inductee, Alydar. A grandson of British Triple Crown winner Nijinsky, he was sired by Shadeed, the 1985 British Champion Miler and winner of the British Classic, the 2,000 Guineas.

Alydeed was owned and raced by David Willmot's Kinghaven Farms. Racing from a base at Woodbine Racetrack in Toronto, at age two his best performances were wins in an allowance race at Gulfstream Park in Florida, where he equalled the track record for 6.5 furlongs, and a win in Woodbine's Victoria Stakes. At age three, Alydeed won five of his ten starts. Near the end of April 1992, he was sent to Churchill Downs in Louisville, Kentucky where he won the Derby Trial. Based on his strong performance, his handlers decided to run him in the second leg of the U.S. Triple Crown series, the Preakness Stakes where he ran second to Pine Bluff. Back at Woodbine Racetrack, he won the Plate Trial Stakes then ran away from the field in the final quarter of a mile to win Canada's most prestigious race, the Queen's Plate. In the second leg of the Canadian Triple Crown series, the Prince of Wales Stakes, Alydeed was sent off as the prohibitive favorite at 1/9 odds. However, on a muddy Fort Erie Racetrack, Alydeed ran second to Benburb. Alydeed then elected to skip the third jewel of the Canadian Triple Crown opting for the Grade 1 Travers Stakes at Saratoga Race Course where he finished eighth to Thunder Rumble as the 8-5 favourite.

In 1993, the then four-year-old Alydeed won his first three races of the year. His wins included the Commonwealth Breeders' Cup Stakes at Keeneland Race Course in Lexington, Kentucky and the Grade I Carter Handicap at New Yorks Aqueduct Racetrack.

== Stud career ==
Retired to stud duty, Alydeed stood at Windfields Farm where he was Canada's leading sire for 2001. Among his most notable offspring is Primaly, the 1997 Canadian Champion 2-Year-Old Filly. In September 2004, after producing 221 winners and 11 stakes winners, Alydeed was sold to Peaceful Valley Stud in Didsbury, Alberta.

Alydeed's descendants include:

c = colt, f = filly

Foaled	Name	Sex	Major Wins
1995	Hedonist	c	Santa Anita Oaks
1997	A La Reine	c	Senator Ken Maddy Handicap
2002	Quick in Deed	c	Bold Ruckus Stakes
