= Japan Bloodhorse Breeders' Association =

The Japan Bloodhorse Breeders' Association
- Native name: 公益社団法人日本軽種馬協会
- Founded: 1946
- Headquarters: JRA Shimbashi Annex 3F, 4-5-4 Shimbashi, Minato-ku, Tokyo 105-0004, JAPAN
- Website: jbba.jp

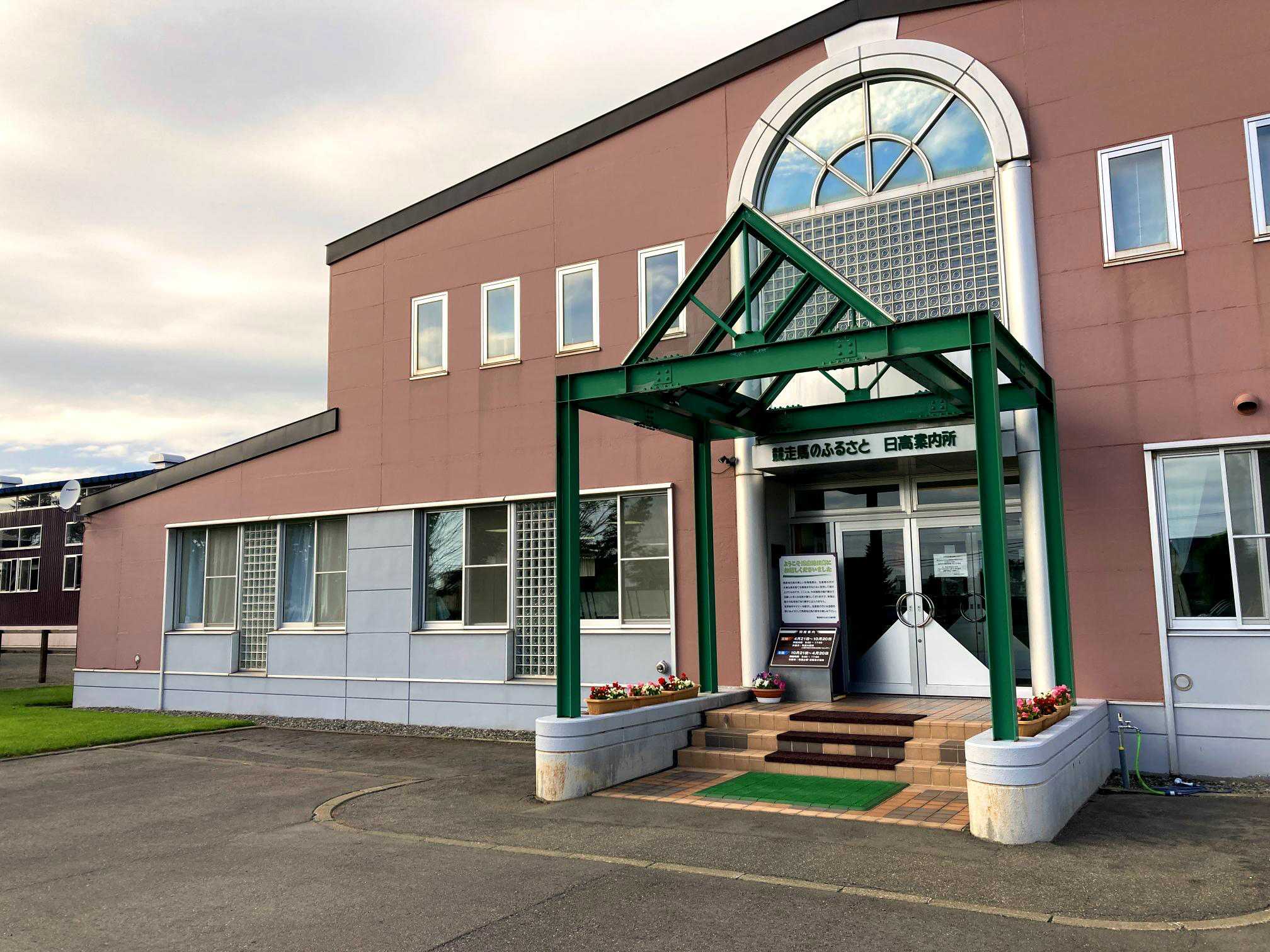
Hidaka Racehorse's Hometown Information Center

The Japan Bloodhorse Breeding Association (Japanese: 日本軽種馬協会, or JBBA) is a public company established to manage the racehorse breeding industry in Japan.

It was founded in 1946 as the Thoroughbred Corporation Association, and renamed as Thoroughbred Breeding Agricultural Union in 1948 before it was given its current name in 1955. The JBBA offers many programs to help small-time thoroughbred breeders around the country. The stallions that they offer are often subsidized so that every breeder has an opportunity to breed to top stallions.

== Services ==
In addition to stallions, the JBBA also offers the following services.

- Financial aid for importing mares
- Financial aid to update breeding and training facilities
- Farm management support and training
- Operating the Japan Bloodstock Information System
- Organizing and marketing public sales of thoroughbred horses
- Educating people who want to work in the breeding industry
- Promoting racing through awards and sponsoring races
- Publishing industry news and statistics
- Providing information to racing fans about racehorse breeding
- Lobbying the government and racing authorities for the interests of the breeders
- Participating in international breeding and racing conferences

== Stallion stations ==
=== Shizunai Stallion Station ===
The Shizunai Stallion Station was opened in 1963 in Shizunai, Hokkaido. The farm covers 652,600 square metres and holds 15 stallions. The following horses are held here as of 2025:

- American Pharaoh (USA)
- Caravaggio (USA)
- Sottsass (FR)
- Declaration of War (USA)
- Makfi (GB)
- Mischievous Alex (USA)
- Noble Mission (GB)
- Sharp Azteca (USA)
- Stella Veloce (JPN)

Other notable horses who have stood at Shizunai Stallion Station includes Pilsudski, Coronado's Quest, Dancing Brave, Silver Charm, Tabasco Cat, Opera House, Came Home, Stravinsky, Boston Harbor, Summer Bird, and Forty Niner.

=== Shichinohe Stallion Station ===
Shichinohe Stallion Station was opened in 1962 and covers 16,700 square meters in Shichinohe, Aomori. It holds four stallions. The following horses are stabled there as of 2025:

- Sabuno Junior (JPN)
- Animal Kingdom (USA)
- Tagano Beauty (JPN)

=== Kyūshū Stallion Station ===
The Kyushu Stallion Station was opened in 1964 and covers 42,300 square meters in Kagoshima, Kyūshū. It has stables for four stallions. The following horses are stabled there as of 2025:

- Red Bel Jour (JPN)
- Nero (JPN)
- Cape Blanco (IRE)

In addition to the above, JBBA owned stallion stations in the following locations before closing in the years between 2007 and 2012: Nasu, Shimofusa, and Iburi.

== Facilities ==
The JBBA also operates an export quarantine facility in Shizunai and Iburi alongside its stallion stations. In addition, they operate the Racehorse's Hometown Information Center (Japanese:競走馬のふるさと案内所), which serves as a tourist information center for anyone that wants to visit retired horses.

== See also ==
- National Association of Racing (NAR) - Japan's local government racing association
- Japan Racing Association (JRA) - Japan's national racing association
