= 1992 Kentucky Derby =

Horse race

118th Kentucky Derby
- Kentucky Derby
- Location: Churchill Downs
- Date: May 2, 1992
- Winning horse: Lil E. Tee
- Jockey: Pat Day
- Trainer: Lynn S. Whiting
- Owner: W. Cal Partee
- Conditions: Fast
- Surface: Dirt
- Attendance: 132,543

The 1992 Kentucky Derby was the 118th running of the Kentucky Derby. The race took place on May 2, 1992. There were 132,543 in attendance. The eighth-place finish of odds-on favorite Arazi was the worst finish of an odds-on betting favorite in Derby history.

== Payout ==
The 118th Kentucky Derby Payout Schedule

Program Number	Horse Name	Win	Place	Show
7	Lil E. Tee	US$35.60	$12.20	$7.60
3	Casual Lies	-	$22.20	$11.60
1A	Dance Floor	-	-	$12.60

- $2 Exacta: (7-3) Paid $854.40

== Full results ==
Finished	Post	Horse	Jockey	Trainer	Owner	Time / behind
1st	10	Lil E. Tee	Pat Day	Lynn S. Whiting	W. Cal Partee	2:03.04
2nd	4	Casual Lies	Gary Stevens	Shelley L. Riley	Shelley L. Riley	
3rd	16	Dance Floor	Chris Antley	D. Wayne Lukas	Oaktown Stable	
4th	8	Conte Di Savoya	Shane Sellers	LeRoy Jolley	Jaime S. Carrion	
5th	12	Pine Bluff	Craig Perret	Thomas Bohannan	Loblolly Stable	
6th	1	Al Sabin	Corey Nakatani	D. Wayne Lukas	Calumet Farm	
7th	15	Dr Devious	Chris McCarron	Peter Chapple-Hyam	Sidney H. Craig	
8th	17	Arazi	Pat Valenzuela	François Boutin	Allen E. Paulson & Sheikh Mohammed	
9th	14	My Luck Runs North	Ricardo Lopez	Angel M. Medina	Melvin A. Benitez	
10th	2	Technology	Jerry Bailey	Hubert Hine	Scott Savin	
11th	11	West by West	Jean-Luc Samyn	George R. Arnold II	John Peace	
12th	6	Devil His Due	Mike E. Smith	H. Allen Jerkens	Lion Crest Stable	
13th	5	Thyer	Christy Roche	Jim Bolger	Maktoum al Maktoum	
14th	13	Ecstatic Ride	Julie Krone	D. Hal Griffitt	DanDar Farm & Joan Rich	
15th	9	Sir Pinder	Randy Romero	Emanuel Tortora	James Lewis Jr.	
16th	7	Pistols and Roses	Jacinto Vásquez	George Gianos	Willis Family Stables	
17th	3	Snappy Landing	John Velazquez	Dennis J. Manning	Frederick McNeary	
18th	18	Disposal	Alex Solis	Bruce Headley	Bramble Farm	
