= Shizunai Stallion Station =

Japanese horse farm

Coordinates: 42.7169°N 141.8247°E

Shizunai Stallion Station (Japanese: 静内種馬場) is a Japanese Thoroughbred horse farm opened in 1963, and located on the island of Hokkaido. Operated by the Japan Bloodhorse Breeders' Association (JBBA), it is located in Shizunai, Hokkaido, the sister city of Lexington, Kentucky. Shizunai Stallion Station stables 15 stallions and plays a central role in the stallion operations of JBBA.

The site features a clinic, an insemination facility, paddocks, stables, a research centre and an indoor riding arena. In 2006 an export quarantine facility was established to hold Japanese-bred horses in quarantine before they are exported to Australasia, Malaysia, Singapore and Hong Kong.

It is the current home of some very famous Thoroughbred stallions from around the world including:

- American Pharoah (USA), initially planned to return to the U.S. in 2026, will return in 2027.
- Caravaggio (USA)
- Declaration of War (USA)
- Alamshar (IRE)
- Sottsass (FR)
- Sharp Azteca (USA)
- Mischievous Alex (USA)
- Makfi (GB)
- Noble Mission (GB)
- Stella Veloce (JPN)

Other notable horses who have stood at Shizunai Stallion Station includes-

- Pilsudski (GB), moved to Ireland in 2004.
- Coronado's Quest (USA), died in 2006.
- Dancing Brave (USA), died in 1999.
- Silver Charm (USA), returned to the U.S. in 2014.
- Tabasco Cat (USA), died in 2004.
- Empire Maker (USA), returned to the U.S. in 2016 and died in 2020.
- Chief Bearhart (CAN), died in 2012.
- David Junior (USA), moved to the Iburi Stallion Station in 2010.
- Summer Bird (USA), died in 2013.
- Forty Niner (USA), was pensioned in 2007 and died in 2020.
- Silent Hunter (JPN), died in 2014.
- Opera House (GB), pensioned in 2013 and died in 2016.
- Charismatic (USA), pensioned and returned to the U.S. in 2016, died in 2017.
- King Glorious (USA), pensioned in 2010 and died in 2016.
- Boston Harbor (USA), died in 2021.
- Came Home (USA), died in 2021.
- Stravinsky (USA), died in 2023.
- Eskendereya (USA), died in 2024.
- Bago (FR)
- Johannesburg (USA)
- Animal Kingdom (USA), relocated to Shichinohe Stallion Station in 2024.
- Cape Blanco (IRE), relocated to Kyushu Stallion Station.
- Creator (USA), relocated to Saudi Arabia in 2025.

== See also ==
- Other JBBA Stallion Stations
  - Shichinohe Stallion Station (Shichinohe, Aomori)
  - Kyūshū Stallion Station (Kagoshima, Kyūshū)
