= Violence (horse) =

Racing horse

- Sire: Medaglia d'Oro
- Dam: Violent Beauty
- Damsire: Gone West
- Sex: Stallion
- Foaled: March 21, 2010
- Country: United States
- Color: Dark Bay or Brown
- Breeder: Dell Ridge Farm
- Owner: Black Rock Stables
- Trainer: Todd A. Pletcher
- Record: 4: 3-1-0
- Earnings: $623,000

Major wins
- CashCall Futurity (2012); Nashua Stakes (2012)
- Last updated on October 11, 2022

Violence (foaled March 21, 2010) is a multiple graded stakes winning American Thoroughbred racehorse who won the 2012 Grade I CashCall Futurity at Hollywood Park and Nashua Stakes at Aqueduct as a two-year-old. He was retired prematurely after sustaining an injury and entered into a stud career at Hill 'n' Dale Farms in 2014.

== Background ==
Violence was a product of Kentucky's Dell Ridge Farm and became the third male and ninth Grade I winner for his sire Medaglia d'Oro. Medaglia d'Oro was usually rated as an important sire of fillies after the successes of 2009 Horse of the Year Rachel Alexandra, champion filly twice Songbird, and two-time Hong Kong Horse of the Year Golden Sixty. Violence is the second foal from the Gone West mare Violent Beauty, whose first foal is the winner Shakespeare colt Laertes. Violent Beauty was one-for-seven in races and she comes from the winning mare Storming Beauty (by Storm Cat) and is a full sister to Group III Horris Stan James Horris Hill Stakes winner of 2005 Hurricane Cat. As Gone West and Storm Cat were products of Secretariat mares, Violent Beauty has inbreeding of $3 \times 4$ on the champion Thoroughbred. The dam of Storming Beauty is the 1994 champion older female Sky Beauty, winner of nine Grade I races, including 1993 Triple Tiara.

Violence was sold for $600,000 from consignment through agents Nick Sallusto and Hanzly Albina at the 2011 Keeneland September Yearling Sale to Steven Marshall's Black Rock Stable. Violence was trained by U.S. Racing Hall of Fame trainer Todd Pletcher.

== Racing career ==
=== 2012: two-year-old season ===
Violence began his career on August 18 at Saratoga in a Maiden Special Weight event for two-year-olds over a distance of seven furlongs in field of 8 of which five were first-starters including the future 2013 Kentucky Derby winner Orb. Violence started as the 4/5 odds-on favorite Violence hesitated at the start then was carried in, advanced between rivals near the five-eighths pole, moved to the outside shortly thereafter, chased the leader, went three wide on the turn, dropped to one off the rail approaching the quarter-pole, pursued Titletown Five. Drifting out inside the furlong marker, drew alongside Titletown Five, bumping him near the wire and narrowly prevailed by a neck with Orb finishing well in third place.

Violence missed some training time with a minor shin injury, and returned with three solid works on the training track at Belmont Park in October. His next start was on November 4 in the Grade II Nashua Stakes at Aqueduct over a mile. Trainer Pletcher also entered stablemate Darwin, a last start maiden winner who started as the 3/5 favorite and was in contention early. However, Violence handily defeated Vegas No Show with Really Sharp in third, five lengths behind the winner. The final time for the one-turn mile was 1:35.32 over a fast main track. Jockey Javier Castellano said, "He wanted to lean in a little, but once Javier got him corrected he finished well. He’s still a young colt, a colt I anticipate will continue to improve physically and mentally."

Todd Pletcher wanting to give more time between races opted to pass the Remsen Stakes at Aqueduct and instead shipped Violence to the West Coast for the Grade I CashCall Futurity at Hollywood Park which was held on December 15. The field included Oxbow who previously won his maiden at Churchill Downs (and later in his three-year-old campaign would win the Preakness Stakes), He's Had Enough who had previously ran second beaten by a head in the Breeders' Cup Juvenile to Shanghai Bobby and GIII Hollywood Prevue Stakes winner Really Mr Greely. Nonetheless, Violence started as the 6/5 favorite and was ridden by Javier Castellano. Violence stalked mid-pack a bit off the rail as a fast pace developed as Fury Kapcori grabbed the early lead under Joe Talamo before Really Mr Greely took over on his outside while clearing the opening quarter in :22.97. The half went in :46.07. After angling to the inside behind the leaders on the clubhouse turn, Violence angled for room to the outside to reach contention rounding the far turn and challenged for the lead approaching mid-stretch. After getting the lead past the furlong mark, he was kept to the task by Castellano as Fury Kapcori continued to battle gamely along the inside. Violence went on to defeated Fury Kapcori by 1 1/4 lengths while completing the 1 1/16-mile distance in 1:43.50 over Hollywood's Cushion Track.

=== 2013: three-year-old season ===
Todd Pletcher sent Violence to his training center at Palm Meadows in Florida after the CashCall Futurity victory for a short rest before preparing for his three-year-old campaign. Pletcher before the race said, "He's done really well so far and everything has gone according to plan while we've focused on getting him ready for the Fountain of Youth." The event, a Road to the Kentucky Derby qualification race attracted promising runners including allowance winners Cerro and Orb, as well as GIII Sam F. Davis Stakes winner Falling Sky and California shipper He's Had Enough from the barn of 2012 Kentucky Derby-winning trainer Doug O'Neill.

Violence started as the 3/5 odds-on favorite chased the pace, eased out to rally three wide leaving the far turn and opened a clear lead in the stretch, then responded when Orb moved to the fore late and held on well while being beaten by half-a-length on to the wire in a time of 1:42.24 for the 1 1/16-mile distance. Violence, who spotted the winner six pounds while carrying top weight of 122 pounds. "We ended up being pretty close to a hot pace and as he tends to do, when he made the lead he kind of idles a little bit," Pletcher said of Violence. "His last race he did kind of the same thing where he waited on horses. You could see Orb coming with that long, sustained run and I think Violence was able to dig in pretty well actually in the stretch and we just came out on the short end."

A week after the event it was announce that Violence had sustained a fracture to his right front medial sesamoid and had been retired from racing. Connections were obviously disappointed with what had occurred and shipped the horse back to Kentucky for evaluation.

== Statistics ==
Date	Distance	Race	Grade	Track	Odds	Field	Finish	Winning Time	Winning (Losing) Margin	Jockey	Ref
2012 – two-year-old season
Aug 18, 2012	7 furlongs	Maiden Special Weight		Saratoga	0.80*	8	1	1:22.91	neck	John Velazquez	
Nov 4, 2012	1 mile	Nashua Stakes	II	Aqueduct	2.90	7	1	1:35.32	2 lengths	Javier Castellano	
Dec 15, 2012	1 1/16 miles	CashCall Futurity	I	Hollywood Park	1.20*	11	1	1:43.50	1 1/4 lengths	Javier Castellano	
2013 – three-year-old season
Feb 23, 2012	1 1/16 miles	Fountain of Youth Stakes	II	Gulfstream Park	0.60*	9	2	1:42.24	1/2 length	Javier Castellano	

Legend:
All Weather Track Dirt
Notes:
An (*) asterisk after the odds means Violence was the post-time favourite.

== Stud career ==
On July 16, 2013, Hill 'n' Dall Farms announced Violence would stand the 2014 breeding season for $15,000. In 2018 his stud fee was increased to $25,000.

Violence has shuttled to Haras La Pasion in Argentina. To date he has two Group 1 winners from his offspring.

Originally, after the successes in 2022 and 2023 of the offspring of Violence, Hill 'n' Dale at Xalapa announced that the 2024 stud fee would be $60,000. However, the stud reduced the fee to $40,000.

=== Notable progeny ===
c = colt, f = filly, g = gelding

Foaled	Name	Sex	Major Wins
2015	Dandy Del Barrio (ARG)	c	Carreras de las Estrellas (ARG) (2019)
2016	Volatile	c	Alfred G. Vanderbilt Handicap
2017	No Parole	c	Woody Stephens Stakes
2018	Fiel Amigo (ARG)	c	Carreras de las Estrellas (ARG), Gran Premio Montevideo (ARG) (2021)
2018	Dr. Schivel	c	Del Mar Futurity, Bing Crosby Stakes
2020	Forte	c	Hopeful Stakes, Breeders' Futurity, Breeders' Cup Juvenile, Florida Derby
2020	Mullikin	c	Forego Stakes

== Pedigree ==
Pedigree of Violence, Dark Bay or Brown colt, March 21, 2010
Sire Medaglia d'Oro (1999)	El Prado (1989)	Sadler's Wells (1981)	Northern Dancer (1961)
Sire Medaglia d'Oro (1999)	El Prado (1989)	Sadler's Wells (1981)	Fairy Bridge (1975)
Sire Medaglia d'Oro (1999)	El Prado (1989)	Lady Capulet (1974)	Sir Ivor (1965)
Sire Medaglia d'Oro (1999)	El Prado (1989)	Lady Capulet (1974)	Cap and Bells (1958)
Sire Medaglia d'Oro (1999)	Cappucino Bay (1989)	Bailjumper (1974)	Damascus (1964)
Sire Medaglia d'Oro (1999)	Cappucino Bay (1989)	Bailjumper (1974)	Court Circuit (1964)
Sire Medaglia d'Oro (1999)	Cappucino Bay (1989)	Dubbed In (1973)	Silent Screen (1967)
Sire Medaglia d'Oro (1999)	Cappucino Bay (1989)	Dubbed In (1973)	Society Singer (1968)
Dam Violent Beauty (2003)	Gone West (1986)	Mr. Prospector (1970)	Raise a Native (1961)
Dam Violent Beauty (2003)	Gone West (1986)	Mr. Prospector (1970)	Gold Digger (1962)
Dam Violent Beauty (2003)	Gone West (1986)	Secrettame (1978)	Secretariat (1970)
Dam Violent Beauty (2003)	Gone West (1986)	Secrettame (1978)	Tamerett (1962)
Dam Violent Beauty (2003)	Storming Beauty (1998)	Storm Cat (1983)	Storm Bird (1983)
Dam Violent Beauty (2003)	Storming Beauty (1998)	Storm Cat (1983)	Terlingua (1976)
Dam Violent Beauty (2003)	Storming Beauty (1998)	Sky Beauty (1990)	Blushing Groom (1974)
Dam Violent Beauty (2003)	Storming Beauty (1998)	Sky Beauty (1990)	Maplejinsky (1985) (family 1g)
