= Aristides Stakes =

Grade III Thoroughbred horse race

- Class: Grade III
- Location: Churchill Downs; Louisville, Kentucky, United States
- Inaugurated: 1989 (as Aristides Breeders' Cup Handicap)
- Race type: Thoroughbred – Flat racing
- Website: Churchill Downs

Race information
- Distance: 6 furlongs
- Surface: Dirt
- Track: left-handed
- Qualification: Four-year-olds and older
- Weight: 122 lbs with allowances
- Purse: US$275,000 (since 2024)

The Aristides Stakes is a Grade III American Thoroughbred horse race for four-year-olds and older over a distance of six furlongs on the dirt scheduled annually in late May or early June at Churchill Downs in Louisville, Kentucky. The event currently offers a purse of $275,000.

== History ==
The Aristides Stakes is named in honor of the racehorse Aristides who won the inaugural Kentucky Derby in 1875 on the Churchill Downs track.

The race itself was inaugurated on June 18, 1989, as the Aristides Breeders' Cup Handicap over a distance of 6 1/2 furlongs and was won by the Paul McGee=trained ex-claimer Bet the Pot. The condition of entry to the handicap were for horses three years old older.

Breeders' Cup sponsorship ceased in 1996 but the quality of entrants continued to improve and the Thoroughbred Owners and Breeders Association upgraded the event to Grade III status.

Bet on Sunshine, the first two-time winner in the race's history, set a new track record of 1:15.11 for 6 1/2 furlongs in 2000 as an eight-year-old then in 2001 beat his own record with a time of 1:14.79.

Breeders' Cup sponsorship resumed in 2004 for three runnings of the event and the distance was decreased to six furlongs. Kelly's Landing ran the fastest six furlongs in Churchill Downs history when he won the 2005 edition in a time of 1:07.59. Later in 2020 Volatile would better the stakes record with a time of 1:07.57 when he won easily by eight lengths as the 1/2 odds-on favorite.

In 2019 the event lost its graded status.

In 2020 the conditions of the event were modified so that only horses four years old and older could enter.

In 2025 the event was upgraded by the Thoroughbred Owners and Breeders Association to a Grade III.

== Records ==
Speed record

- 6 furlongs: 1:07.57 – Volatile (2020)
- 6 1/2 furlongs: 1:14.41 – Orientate (2002)

Margins

- 8 lengths – Volatile (2020)

Most wins

- 2 – Bet On Sunshine (2000, 2001)
- 2 – Alsvid (2015, 2016)
- 2 – Bango (2021, 2022)

Most wins by a jockey

- 3 – Shane J. Sellers (1994, 1997, 1998)
- 3 – Corey J. Lanerie (2003, 2017, 2019)

Most wins by a trainer

- 5 – Steven M. Asmussen (2003, 2010, 2012, 2020, 2023)

Most wins by an owner

- 2 – David P. Halloway Racing (2000, 2001)
- 2 – Maggi Moss (2008, 2014)
- 2 – Black Hawk Stable (2015, 2016)
- 2 – Tamaroak Partners (2021, 2022)
- 2 – Three Chimneys Farm (2020, 2026)

== Winners ==
Year	Winner	Age	Jockey	Trainer	Owner	Distance	Time	Purse	Grade	Ref
Aristides Stakes
2026	Cornucopian	4	Flavien Prat	Bob Baffert	Three Chimneys Farm & Whisper HillFarm	6 furlongs	1:10.02	$263,500	III	
2025	Durante	6	Jose L. Ortiz	David Jacobson	David Jacobson	6 furlongs	1:09.23	$275,000	III	
2024	Closethegame Sugar	4	Irad Ortiz Jr.	Adam Rice	Adam Rice & Sugar Diaz	6 furlongs	1:08.39	$260,000	Listed	
2023	Gunite	4	Tyler Gaffalione	Steven M. Asmussen	Winchell Thoroughbreds	6 furlongs	1:08.46	$224,500	Listed	
2022	Bango	5	Tyler Gaffalione	Gregory D. Foley	Tamaroak Partners	6 furlongs	1:08.54	$199,833	Listed	
2021	Bango	4	Marcelino Pedroza Jr.	Gregory D. Foley	Tamaroak Partners	6 furlongs	1:09.65	$150,000	Listed	
2020	Volatile	4	Ricardo Santana Jr.	Steven M. Asmussen	Phoenix Thoroughbred III & Three Chimneys Farm	6 furlongs	1:07.57	$100,000	Listed	
2019	Wilbo	7	Corey J. Lanerie	Chris A. Hartman	Chris Wilkins	6 furlongs	1:09.27	$125,000	Listed	
2018	Chief Cicatriz	5	James Graham	Shawn H. Davis	Roy Gene Stables	6 furlongs	1:08.44	$100,000	III	
2017	Limousine Liberal	5	Corey J. Lanerie	Ben Colebrook	Katherine Ball	6 furlongs	1:09.12	$100,000	III	
2016	Alsvid	7	Chris Landeros	Chris A. Hartman	Black Hawk Stable	6 furlongs	1:08.26	$100,000	III	
2015	Alsvid	6	Chris Landeros	Chris A. Hartman	Black Hawk Stable	6 furlongs	1:09.34	$100,000	III	
2014	Delaunay	7	Rosie Napravnik	Thomas M. Amoss	Maggi Moss	6 furlongs	1:09.59	$112,900	III	
2013	Scatman	4	Shaun Bridgmohan	William I. Mott	JEOG Racing	6 furlongs	1:10.56	$106,800	III	
2012	Rothko	4	Corey Nakatani	Steven M. Asmussen	Padua Stables	6 furlongs	1:09.40	$109,400	III	
2011	Noble's Promise	4	Alan Garcia	Kenneth G. McPeek	Chasing Dreams Racing	6 furlongs	1:08.74	$110,300	III	
2010	Riley Tucker	5	Shaun Bridgmohan	Steven M. Asmussen	Zayat Stables	6 furlongs	1:08.34	$107,900	III	
2009	Bold Start	5	Robby Albarado	Kenneth G. McPeek	Lawrence Carroll	6 furlongs	1:09.04	$112,600	III	
2008	Indian Chant	5	Jamie Theriot	Tom Amoss	Maggi Moss	6 furlongs	1:08.40	$119,125	III	
2007	Fabulous Strike	4	Ramon Dominguez	Todd Beattie	Tea Party Stable	6 furlongs	1:07.64	$159,600	III	
Aristides Breeders' Cup Handicap
2006	Lost in the Fog	4	Russell Baze	Greg Gilchrist	Harry J. Aleo	6 furlongs	1:08.52	$131,450	III	
2005	Kelly's Landing	4	Gary Stevens	Eddie Kenneally	Summerplace Farm	6 furlongs	1:07.59	$162,450	III	
2004	Champali	4	Rafael Bejarano	Gregory Foley	Lloyd Madison Farms	6 furlongs	1:09.04	$162,150	III	
Aristides Handicap
2003	Mountain General	5	Corey J. Lanerie	Steven M. Asmussen	Keith I. Asmussen	6 1/2 furlongs	1:16.01	$109,000	III	
2002	Orientate	4	Robby Albarado	D. Wayne Lukas	Bob & Beverly Lewis	6 1/2 furlongs	1:14.41	$107,500	III	
2001	Bet On Sunshine	9	Calvin Borel	Paul J. McGee	David P. Halloway Racing	6 1/2 furlongs	1:14.79	$108,400	III	
2000	Bet On Sunshine	8	Francisco Torres	Paul J. McGee	David P. Halloway Racing	6 1/2 furlongs	1:15.11	$109,700	III	
1999	Run Johnny	7	Pat Day	Morris G. Nicks	John Oakley	6 1/2 furlongs	1:16.27	$110,600	III	
1998	Thisnearlywasmine	4	Shane J. Sellers	Randy K. Bradshaw	Samantha Siegal, Jan Siegal, & Mace Siegal	6 1/2 furlongs	1:15.72	$108,900	Listed	
1997	High Stakes Player	5	Shane J. Sellers	Bob Baffert	Michael E. Pegram	6 1/2 furlongs	1:15.85	$109,000	Listed	
1996	Lord Carson	4	Donna M. Barton	D. Wayne Lukas	David P. Reynolds	6 1/2 furlongs	1:15.94	$108,500	Listed	
Aristides Breeders' Cup Handicap
1995	Boones Mill	3	Donna M. Barton	D. Wayne Lukas	Overbrook Farm	6 1/2 furlongs	1:15.90	$103,825	Listed	
1994	Never Wavering	5	Shane J. Sellers	W. Elliott Walden	John Sullivan & V.I. Fisher	6 1/2 furlongs	1:16.55	$91,025	Listed	
1993	Gold Spring (ARG)	5	Fabio A. Arguello Jr.	Jesse N. Wigginton	Ross Harris	6 1/2 furlongs	1:16.43	$63,701	Listed	
1992	Tricky Fun	4	Pat Day	William H. Fires	Patricia B. Blass	6 1/2 furlongs	1:16.35	$68,800		
1991	Bio	5	Brent E. Bartman	Steven C. Penrod	Waddell W. Hancock	6 1/2 furlongs	1:16.62	$63,520		
1990	Beau Genius (CAN)	5	Ricardo D. Lopez	Gerald S. Bennett	Dr Brian Davidson	6 1/2 furlongs	1:16.51	$67,100		
1989	Bet The Pot	4	Charles R. Woods Jr.	Paul J. McGee	McMichael's Racing Stables	6 1/2 furlongs	1:15.44	$49,350		

== See also ==
- List of American and Canadian Graded races
