= Volatile (horse) =

American thoroughbred racehorse

- Breed: Thoroughbred
- Sire: Violence
- Grandsire: Medaglia D'Oro
- Dam: Melody Lady
- Damsire: Unbridled's Song
- Sex: Colt
- Foaled: March 20, 2016 (age 10)
- Country: United States of America
- Breeder: Hill 'n' Dale Equine Holdings, Inc. & Stretch Run Ventures
- Owner: Three Chimneys Farm and Phoenix Thoroughbred III
- Trainer: Steve Asmussen
- Jockey: Ricardo Santana, Jr.
- Record: 6:5-1-0
- Earnings: $341,040

Major wins
- Alfred G. Vanderbilt Handicap (2020)
- Last updated on May 12, 2026

Volatile (foaled March 20, 2016) is an American Thoroughbred racehorse and the winner of the 2020 Alfred G. Vanderbilt Handicap.

== Background ==
Volatile was bred in Kentucky by Hill 'n' Dale Equine Holdings and Stretch Run Ventures, Volatile is the second stakes winner from his 10-year-old dam, the stakes-winning Unbridled's Song mare Melody Lady . Her first, Buy Sell Hold, a full sister to Volatile, won the Kentucky Juvenile Stakes at Churchill Downs for trainer Steven Asmussen in May 2017.

Volatile's second dam, Lady Tak (by Mutakddim), excelled sprinting at Saratoga, winning the Grade I Test Stakes and Ballerina Handicap there.

Volatile was an $850,000 purchase by Kerri Radcliffe Bloodstock and Three Chimneys Farm from the Hill 'n' Dale Sales Agency consignment at the 2017 Keeneland September Yearling Sale.

== Racing career ==
Volatile's first race was on July 13, 2019, at Ellis Park, where he came in first in a Maiden Special Weight race. He placed 2nd in an Allowance race on September 14, 2019, at Churchill Downs, then began a three race winstreak.

He grabbed an Allowance race victory on November 3, 2019, at Churchill Downs, and then picked up an Allowance Optional Claiming victory at Oaklawn Park on April 24, 2020.

Volatile picked up his first stakes win on June 6, 2020, at the Aristides Stakes. He came in as the 1/2 odds-on favorite and came within two one-hundredths of a second off of the track record during the win, defeating Honest Mischief and winning $100,000.

On July 25, 2020, at Saratoga, Volatile won the 2020 Grade I Alfred G. Vanderbilt Handicap. Volatile came into the four horse field as the heavy favorite at 2/5 odds and defeated Whitmore, who came in 2nd.

On September 21, 2020, the owners announced that Volatile suffered "a hairline fracture of his right front cannon bone", and as a result was to be retired.

== Statistics ==
Date	Distance	Race	Grade	Track	Odds	Field	Finish	Winning Time	Winning (Losing) Margin	Jockey	Ref
2019 – three-year-old season
Jul 13, 2019	6 furlongs	Maiden Special Weight		Ellis Park	9.00	9	1	1:10.84	3/4 length	Rayan Gazader	
Sep 14, 2019	6 furlongs	Allowance		Churchill Downs	5.50	9	2	1:09.41	(1 1/4 lengths)	Ricardo Santana Jr.	
Nov 3, 2019	6 furlongs	Allowance		Churchill Downs	0.70*	7	1	1:09.10	3 lengths	Ricardo Santana Jr.	
2020 – four-year-old season
Apr 24, 2020	6 furlongs	Allowance Optional Claiming		Churchill Downs	1.20*	11	1	1:08.48	7 1/2 lengths	Ricardo Santana Jr.	
Jun 6, 2020	6 furlongs	Aristides Stakes	Listed	Churchill Downs	0.50*	6	1	1:07:55	8 lengths	Ricardo Santana Jr.	
Jul 25, 2020	6 furlongs	Alfred G. Vanderbilt Handicap	I	Saratoga	0.40*	4	1	1:09.61	1 1/4 lengths	Ricardo Santana Jr.	

Notes:
An (*) asterisk after the odds means Volatile was the post-time favourite.

== Stud career ==
Following the announcement of his retirement, it was also announced that the horse would stand stud at Three Chimneys Farm starting from the 2021 season. To date, his most successful progeny is T O Elvis, a Japanese-trained horse who has won the Churchill Downs Stakes and Breeders' Cup Sprint in the United States.

In 2026 Volatile stood for US$10,000.

=== Notable progeny ===
c = colt, f = filly, g = gelding

Foaled	Name	Sex	Major Wins
2022	T O Elvis	c	Churchill Downs Stakes (2026), Breeders' Cup Sprint (2026)
2023	Come Candela	c	Clásico Día Internacional del Trabajador (2026)

== Pedigree ==
Pedigree of Volatile (USA), 2016
Sire Violence (USA) (2010)	Medaglia D'Oro (USA) (1999)	El Prado (1989)	Sadler's Wells (1981)
Sire Violence (USA) (2010)	Medaglia D'Oro (USA) (1999)	El Prado (1989)	Lady Capulet (1974)
Sire Violence (USA) (2010)	Medaglia D'Oro (USA) (1999)	Cappucino Bay (1989)	Bailjumper (1974)
Sire Violence (USA) (2010)	Medaglia D'Oro (USA) (1999)	Cappucino Bay (1989)	Dubbed In (1973)
Sire Violence (USA) (2010)	Violent Beauty (USA) (2003)	Gone West (1984)	Mr. Prospector (1970)
Sire Violence (USA) (2010)	Violent Beauty (USA) (2003)	Gone West (1984)	Secrettame (1978)
Sire Violence (USA) (2010)	Violent Beauty (USA) (2003)	Storming Beauty (1998)	Storm Cat (1983)
Sire Violence (USA) (2010)	Violent Beauty (USA) (2003)	Storming Beauty (1998)	Sky Beauty (1990)
Dam Melody Lady (USA) (2010)	Unbridled's Song (USA) (1993)	Unbridled (1987)	Fappiano (1977)
Dam Melody Lady (USA) (2010)	Unbridled's Song (USA) (1993)	Unbridled (1987)	Gana Facil (1981)
Dam Melody Lady (USA) (2010)	Unbridled's Song (USA) (1993)	Trolley Song (1983)	Caro (IRE) (1967)
Dam Melody Lady (USA) (2010)	Unbridled's Song (USA) (1993)	Trolley Song (1983)	Lucky Spell (1971)
Dam Melody Lady (USA) (2010)	Lady Tak (USA) (2000)	Mutakddim (1991)	Seeking the Gold (1985)
Dam Melody Lady (USA) (2010)	Lady Tak (USA) (2000)	Mutakddim (1991)	Oscillate (1986)
Dam Melody Lady (USA) (2010)	Lady Tak (USA) (2000)	Star of My Eye (1990)	Lucky North (1981)
Dam Melody Lady (USA) (2010)	Lady Tak (USA) (2000)	Star of My Eye (1990)	Dangerous Star (1967)(Family 21-a)
