= Coronado's Quest =

American-bred Thoroughbred racehorse

- Sire: Forty Niner
- Grandsire: Mr. Prospector
- Dam: Laughing Look
- Damsire: Damascus
- Sex: Stallion
- Foaled: 1995
- Country: United States
- Colour: Chestnut
- Breeder: Stuart S. Janney III
- Owner: Japan Bloodhorse Breeders' Association
- Trainer: Claude R. McGaughey III
- Record: 17: 10-2-0
- Earnings: $2,046,190

Major wins
- Travers Stakes (1998); Haskell Invitational (1998); Remsen Stakes (1997); Cowdin Stakes (1997); Nashua Stakes (1997); Wood Memorial (1998); Dwyer Stakes (1998); Riva Ridge Stakes (1998)
- Last updated on January, 2008

Coronado's Quest (コロナドズクエスト, Koronadozukuesuto) (February 15, 1995 – March 8, 2006) was an American-based Thoroughbred racehorse. He was sired by 1987 Champion Two Year Old Colt Forty Niner, out of the unraced Damascus daughter Laughing Look. His granddam, Laughter, is a 3/4 sister to the great Ruffian.

== Racing career ==
As a two-year-old, Coronado's Quest won three graded stakes, all in New York, including a victory in the Remsen Stakes over future Blue Grass Stakes winner Halory Hunter. The following year, he was known for his moody temperament (which earned him the nickname "the Bad Boy of Racing") as much as his talent. He started his three-year-old campaign in Florida with a second in the Hutcheson stakes to Time Limit after dumping jockey Mike Smith before the race. His antics just got worse from there, coming to a head with a dismal fifth in the Florida Derby, which effectively ended his chance at the Kentucky Derby.

After the fiasco in Florida, Coronado's Quest returned to New York. He underwent a routine surgery to fix an entrapped epiglottis and the improvement was dramatic. He reeled off five straight graded stakes scores, culminating in a nose win over Belmont Stakes winner Victory Gallop in the Travers Stakes. It was eerily similar to his sire's Travers win over Seeking the Gold and Brian's Time ten years prior.

== Stallion career ==
Coronado's Quest was retired to stand stud at the historic Claiborne Farm in 1999. He was sold to Japan in 2003, where he died March 8, 2006, from heart failure after covering a mare at the Japan Bloodhorse Breeders' Association's Shizunai Stallion Station in Hokkaido.

Coronado's Quest was only moderately successful at stud, despite his excellent pedigree and race record. He sired seventeen stakes winners, including multiple Grade I winner Society Selection in America, Grade I winner Crucifijo in Mexico and Group 2 winner Al Jadeed in Europe. While standing in Japan he sired Grade 3 winner Ceres Hunt (セレスハント Seresuhanto).

Though a disappointment as a sire, he has quickly become a top young broodmare sire. His most notable grandsons and daughters include champions Kodiak Kowboy, Grand Adventure and Grade I winners Mani Bhavan and Boys at Tosconova.
