= Eskendereya =

American-bred Thoroughbred racehorse (2007–2024)

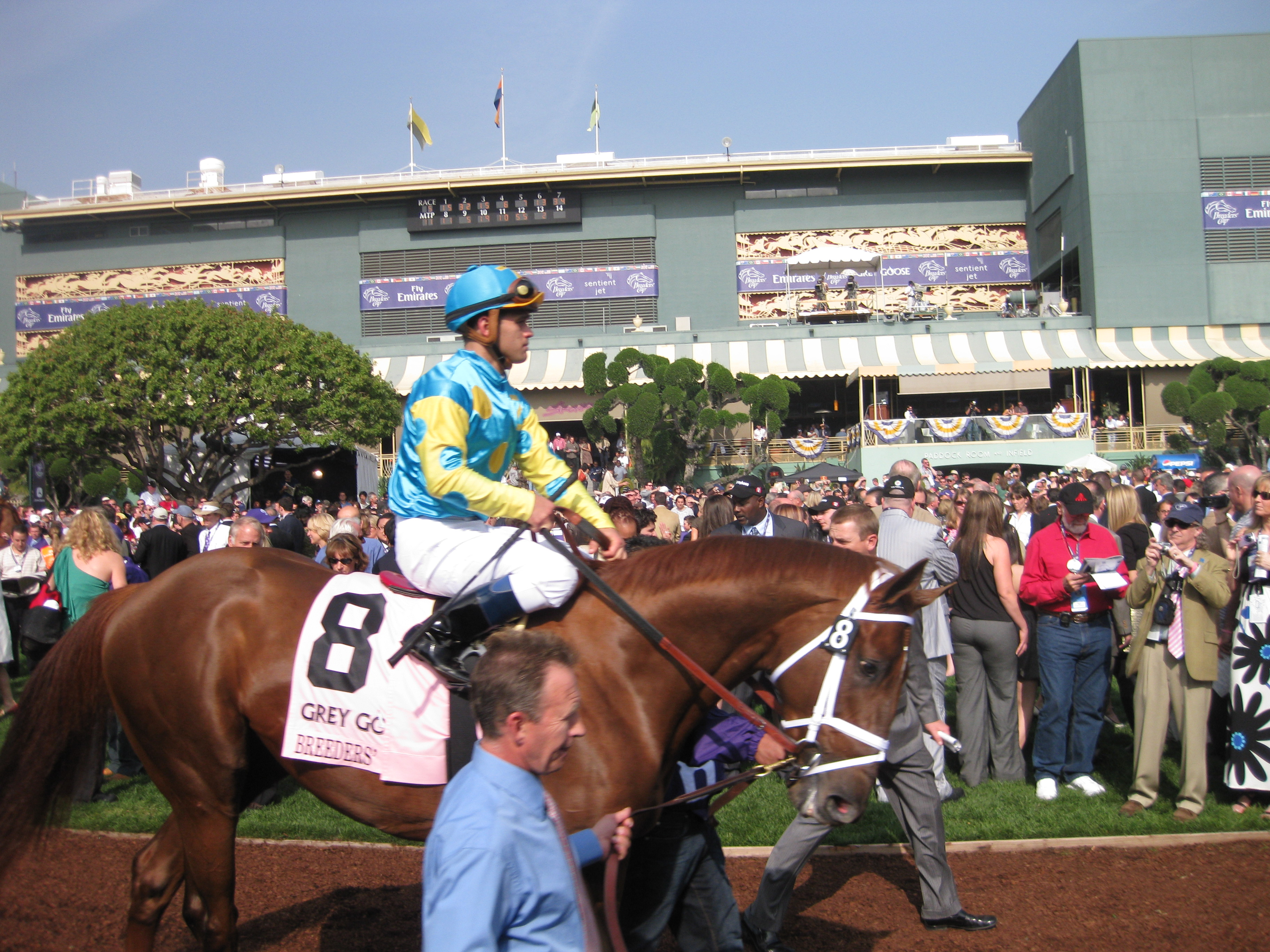
- Eskendereya as a two-year-old, 2009
- Sire: Giant's Causeway
- Grandsire: Storm Cat
- Dam: Aldebaran Light
- Damsire: Seattle Slew
- Sex: Colt
- Foaled: 2007
- Died: March 2, 2024 (aged 17); Hokkiado, Japan
- Country: United States
- Colour: Chestnut
- Breeder: Sanford Robertson
- Owner: Zayat Stables
- Trainer: Todd A. Pletcher
- Record: 6: 4-1-0
- Earnings: US$725,700

Major wins
- Pilgrim Stakes (2009); Fountain of Youth Stakes (2010); Wood Memorial Stakes (2010)
- Last updated on April 4, 2010

Eskendereya (foaled 2007 – March 2, 2024) was an American Thoroughbred racehorse and sire.

== Background ==
Eskendereya was sired by Giant's Causeway, a son of North America's one time leading sire Storm Cat. Bred in Kentucky by Sanford Robertson, Eskendereya was a $250,000 Keeneland September purchase. His dam was Aldebaran Light, who is a daughter of champion Seattle Slew. Aldebaran Light is also the dam of Group I winner Balmont. Eskendereya was owned by Zayat Stables, and was trained by Todd Pletcher.

== Racing career ==
Eskendereya made his career debut on turf at Saratoga, rallying from off the pace to finish second. He followed that with a victory in the Pilgrim Stakes.

On February 20, 2010, Eskendereya took the lead entering the final turn and pulled away for an 8½-length victory in the Grade II Fountain of Youth Stakes, beating favorite Buddy's Saint. This win made Eskendereya one of the early favorites for the Kentucky Derby. On April 3, 2010, Eskendereya won the Wood Memorial Stakes by 9¾ lengths, essentially repeating his dominating performance in Florida. This made him the Kentucky Derby favorite. However, it was announced on April 25 that Eskendereya would be pulled out of the Kentucky Derby after he sustained a leg injury. He did not race again.

== Retirement to stud ==
Eskendereya entered stud in 2011 at Taylor Made Stallions in Nicholasville, Kentucky. His starting stud fee was $30,000. In 2013 his stud fee was lowered to $17,500.

In September 2015, it was announced that Eskendereya had been sold and would stand in Japan for the 2016 season, standing at the Shizunai Stallion Station.

Eskendereya's most successful progeny to date include Mitole, winner of the 2019 Forego Stakes, the Metropolitan Handicap, the Churchill Downs Stakes and the Breeders' Cup Sprint; Mor Spirit, winner of the Metropolitan Handicap, Robert B. Lewis Stakes, and the Los Alamitos Futurity; Isabella Sings, winner of the Mrs. Revere Stakes, Eatontown Handicap, and the Endeavour Stakes; and Eskenformoney, winner of the 2016 Rampart Stakes. Eskendereya has also sired several listed stakes winners that have each won over $100,000 in purse money.

== Death ==
On March 2, 2024, it was announced that Eskendereya had died from heart failure at the age of 17.

== Pedigree ==
Pedigree of Eskendereya, chestnut stallion, 2007
Sire Giant's Causeway	Storm Cat	Storm Bird	Northern Dancer
Sire Giant's Causeway	Storm Cat	Storm Bird	South Ocean
Sire Giant's Causeway	Storm Cat	Terlingua	Secretariat
Sire Giant's Causeway	Storm Cat	Terlingua	Crimson Saint
Sire Giant's Causeway	Mariah's Storm	Rahy	Blushing Groom
Sire Giant's Causeway	Mariah's Storm	Rahy	Glorious Song
Sire Giant's Causeway	Mariah's Storm	Immense	Roberto
Sire Giant's Causeway	Mariah's Storm	Immense	Imsodear
Dam Aldebaran Light	Seattle Slew	Bold Reasoning	Boldnesian
Dam Aldebaran Light	Seattle Slew	Bold Reasoning	Reason To Earn
Dam Aldebaran Light	Seattle Slew	My Charmer	Poker
Dam Aldebaran Light	Seattle Slew	My Charmer	Fair Charmer
Dam Aldebaran Light	Altair	Alydar	Raise a Native
Dam Aldebaran Light	Altair	Alydar	Sweet Tooth
Dam Aldebaran Light	Altair	Stellar Odyssey	Northern Dancer
Dam Aldebaran Light	Altair	Stellar Odyssey	Queen Sucree

== Sources ==
- Eskendereya's pedigree and racing stats
