= Lil E. Tee =

American Thoroughbred racehorse

- Sire: At the Threshold
- Grandsire: Norcliffe
- Dam: Eileen's Moment
- Damsire: For The Moment
- Sex: Stallion
- Foaled: 1989
- Country: United States
- Color: Bay
- Breeder: Lawrence I. Littman
- Owner: W. Cal Partee
- Trainer: Lynn S. Whiting
- Record: 13: 7-4-1
- Earnings: $1,437,506.

Major wins
- Jim Beam Stakes (1992); Razorback Handicap (1993) U.S. Triple Crown wins: Kentucky Derby (1992)

Honors
- Lil E. Tee Handicap at Presque Isle Downs

Lil E. Tee (March 29, 1989 – March 18, 2009) was an American-bred Thoroughbred racehorse who in 1992 scored one of the biggest upsets in the history of the Kentucky Derby.

== Background ==
A bay colt, Lil E. Tee was bred in Pennsylvania by Lawrence I. Littman.

The name of the colt was explained by Gwen Rynkiewicz, assistant trainer at Laurel Race Course: All of Littman's horses have "Lil," the initials of Lawrence I. Littman, somewhere in their names. Rynkiewicz said she was told "that Lil E. Tee was so ugly and gangly when he was a foal that they named him after E.T., the extraterrestrial creature in the Steven Spielberg movie."

Many sportswriters have described his pedigree as being unimpressive. Although his sire, At the Threshold, was a multiple Grade I stakes winner, he produced only eight stakes winners during his stud career. Lil E. Tee's dam, Eileen's Moment, never won a race and had career earnings of $570. However, At the Threshold was sired by Norcliffe, who was a son of U.S. Hall of Fame Champion Buckpasser. Norcliffe earned Horse of the Year honours in Canada and was elected to the Canadian Horse Racing Hall of Fame. At stud, he was North America's leading juvenile sire by number of wins and was second in earnings in 1981.

As a weanling, Lil E. Tee nearly died but was saved by emergency stomach surgery. Considered to have little racing potential, he was sold for $2,000 as a yearling. When he was two, his owner tried to sell him again but was rejected by an auction company that deemed the horse unsaleable. Lil E. Tee ended up in the hands of a Florida owner and was stabled at Calder Race Course in Miami, Florida.

== Racing career ==
=== Florida: Two-year-old season ===
In Florida, Lil E. Tee finished second in his first start and then won a 7-furlong maiden race. He was sold again, this time to W. Cal Partee, who shipped him to trainer Lynn S. Whiting at Churchill Downs, where Lil E. Tee won a one-mile allowance race. Of his four starts at age two, the horse won twice and finished second twice.

=== Arkansas: Prep races ===
Racing in Arkansas, at age three Lil E. Tee won the Grade II Jim Beam Stakes and finished second by a neck to Pine Bluff in the Arkansas Derby, results that led to his appearance in the 1992 Kentucky Derby.

=== Kentucky Derby: The build-up ===
Lil E. Tee was ridden by jockey Pat Day, who hadn't won a Derby in nine previous attempts. On a track rated as fast, the horse went off at odds of 17–1 in front of a record crowd that had come to see European Horse of the Year Arazi. The press had talked about little except Arazi since his dominating win in the previous October's Breeders' Cup Juvenile. The New York Times called him "mythical and almost mystical" and TIME magazine said, "Arazi is fast winning a reputation as the second coming of Secretariat." Joe Hirsch, a respected columnist with the New Jersey–based Daily Racing Form, wrote that Arazi was "such an extraordinary animal that he makes other great horses look like hacks". Arazi's jockey, Patrick Valenzuela, who had won the 1989 Derby aboard Sunday Silence, assured reporters that "This race is over." Fifteen years after his Breeders' Cup win, a National Thoroughbred Racing Association (NTRA) 2006 article said that "Arazi turned in what many still consider to be the single-most spectacular performance in Breeders' Cup history."

=== Kentucky Derby: The race ===
Starting in post position #10, Lil E. Tee got off to a clean start in the 1992 Kentucky Derby and was in tenth place after half a mile. Arazi, who had started on the far outside in post position #17, made an explosive move. ABC television announcer Dave Johnson exclaimed "Arazi is flying" as the colt went seven wide, sweeping past horse after horse to move into third place, tightly bunched with the leaders. Lil E. Tee followed Arazi, moving into 5th place. As they approached the home stretch, though, Arazi tired badly. Lil E. Tee made his move and soon caught the front-running Casual Lies to win the most prestigious race in America and $724,800.

=== Later career ===
After the Derby, Lil E. Tee was entered in the Preakness Stakes, the second leg of the American Triple Crown races. He finished 5th, five lengths behind winner Pine Bluff. Lil E. Tee then skipped the Belmont Stakes after being diagnosed with a lung infection. On June 9, the colt's racing season ended when he underwent arthroscopic surgery to remove bone chips from his front ankles. Recovered, in 1993 at age 4, Lil E. Tee won the Grade II Razorback Handicap. He also finished second in the Oaklawn Handicap. He was retired that year with a lifetime record of 7-4-1 from 13 starts and earnings of $1,437,506.

=== Race record ===
Date	Age	Distance	Race	Grade	Track	Odds	Field	Finish	Winning Time	Winning (Losing) Margin	Jockey	Ref
Sep 28, 1991	2	6 furlongs	Maiden Special Weight	Maiden	Calder Race Course	3.70	10	2	1:11.56	(4 1/2 lengths)	Gene St. Leon	
Oct 6, 1991	2	7 furlongs	Maiden Special Weight	Maiden	Calder Race Course	*0.70	10	1	1:24.56	11 1/2 lengths	Gene St. Leon	
Nov 1, 1991	2	1 1/16 miles	Allowance	Allowance	Churchill Downs	*0.70	6	2	1:48.80	(neck)	Pat Day	
Nov 12, 1991	2	1 mile	Allowance	Allowance	Churchill Downs	*0.60	8	1	1:39.17	3 lengths	Pat Day	
Feb 9, 1992	3	6 furlongs	Allowance	Allowance	Oaklawn Park	*0.70	8	1	1:10.31	4 1/2 lengths	Pat Day	
Mar 7, 1992	3	1 mile	Southwest Stakes	Listed	Oaklawn Park	2.10	6	3	1:36.68	(2 1/2 lengths)	Pat Day	
Mar 28, 1992	3	1 1/8 miles	Jim Beam Stakes	II	Turfway Park	4.50	11	1	1:53.44	1 length	Pat Day	
Apr 18, 1992	3	1 1/8 miles	Arkansas Derby	II	Oaklawn Park	2.10	6	2	1:49.49	(neck)	Pat Day	
May 2, 1992	3	1 1/4 miles	Kentucky Derby	I	Churchill Downs	16.80	18	1	2:03.04	1 length	Pat Day	
May 16, 1992	3	1 3/16 miles	Preakness Stakes	I	Pimlico Race Course	4.20	14	5	1:55.60	(5 lengths)	Pat Day	
Feb 20, 1993	4	6 furlongs	Allowance	Allowance	Oaklawn Park	*1.10	8	1	1:08.44	1 1/4 lengths	Pat Day	
Mar 20, 1993	4	1 1/16 miles	Razorback Handicap	II	Oaklawn Park	*0.40	7	1	1:41.55	1 1/4 lengths	Pat Day	
Apr 10, 1993	4	1 1/8 miles	Oaklawn Handicap	I	Oaklawn Park	*1.10	10	2	1:48.63	(1 1/4 lengths)	Pat Day	

== Stud career ==
Lil E. Tee stood at stud at Old Frankfort Stud near Lexington, Kentucky, until he was euthanized on March 18, 2009. Farm owner Jim Plemmons said the horse fell ill the month prior following an operation to repair an obstructed bowel.

Lil E. Tee sired 20 stakes winners in total, with progeny earnings reaching $9.9 million. His best runners include multiple graded stakes winner Mula Gula and graded winner Jim'smrtee.

Mula Gula currently stands stallion duties at Midas Hill Farm in Texas.

== Pedigree ==
Pedigree of Lil E. Tee (USA), bay stallion, 1989
Sire At the Threshold (USA) 1981	Norcliffe (CAN); 1973	Buckpasser	Tom Fool
Sire At the Threshold (USA) 1981	Norcliffe (CAN); 1973	Buckpasser	Busanda
Sire At the Threshold (USA) 1981	Norcliffe (CAN); 1973	Drama School	Northern Dancer
Sire At the Threshold (USA) 1981	Norcliffe (CAN); 1973	Drama School	Stalina
Sire At the Threshold (USA) 1981	Winver (USA); 1972	Vertex	The Rhymer
Sire At the Threshold (USA) 1981	Winver (USA); 1972	Vertex	Kanace
Sire At the Threshold (USA) 1981	Winver (USA); 1972	Windsor Lady	Prince John
Sire At the Threshold (USA) 1981	Winver (USA); 1972	Windsor Lady	June Fete
Dam Eileen's Moment (USA) 1982	For the Moment (USA); 1974	What A Pleasure	Bold Ruler
Dam Eileen's Moment (USA) 1982	For the Moment (USA); 1974	What A Pleasure	Grey Flight
Dam Eileen's Moment (USA) 1982	For the Moment (USA); 1974	Tularia	Tulyar
Dam Eileen's Moment (USA) 1982	For the Moment (USA); 1974	Tularia	Sun Top
Dam Eileen's Moment (USA) 1982	Sailaway (USA); 1976	Hawaii	Utrillo
Dam Eileen's Moment (USA) 1982	Sailaway (USA); 1976	Hawaii	Ethane
Dam Eileen's Moment (USA) 1982	Sailaway (USA); 1976	Quick Wit	Shannon
Dam Eileen's Moment (USA) 1982	Sailaway (USA); 1976	Quick Wit	Witty (Family: 23-b)

== Bibliography ==
- John Eisenberg The Longest Shot: Lil E. Tee and the Kentucky Derby (1996) University Press of Kentucky ISBN 0-8131-1956-1
- Old Frankfort Stud website
- Archived copy of Old Frankfort Stud website - Wayback Machine, January 9, 2014
