= Bruce N. Levine =

American horse trainer

Bruce Levine
Personal information
- Born: February 7, 1955 (age 71) New York City, New York, United States
- Occupation: Trainer

Horse racing career
- Sport: Horse racing
- Career wins: 2,033+ (ongoing)

Major racing wins
- Cotillion Handicap (1982); Damon Runyon Stakes (1983); Black-Eyed Susan Stakes (1985); Firenze Handicap (1985); Frizette Stakes (1985); Bonnie Miss Stakes (1986); Barbara Fritchie Handicap (1987); Gallant Fox Handicap (1998, 2000, 2001, 2002); Maryland Million Sprint Handicap (2004); Hollie Hughes Handicap (2006); Miss Grillo Stakes (2006); Violet Handicap (2006); Jersey Derby (2007); Carter Handicap (2008); Excelsior Handicap (2008); General George Handicap (2008); Pan American Handicap (2009); Remsen Stakes (2009); New York Breeders' Futurity (2010); Hudson Stakes (NYB) (2009, 2024)

Racing awards
- Leading trainer at Meadowlands (2007); Leading trainer at Monmouth Park (2008, 2009)

Significant horses
- Buddy's Saint

Bruce N. Levine (born February 7, 1955) is a trainer of Thoroughbred racehorses.

Raised on Long Island, New York, Levine earned a Bachelor of Arts degree in business administration from the University of Miami before becoming a trainer. He saddled his first race winner in 1979, and as of the fall of 2009 has won more than 2,200 races. He won a training title at Meadowlands Racetrack in 2007 and at Monmouth Park Racetrack in 2008 and 2009.
