= Katsuma Sameshima =

Japanese jockey (born 1996)

Katsuma Sameshima 鮫島克駿
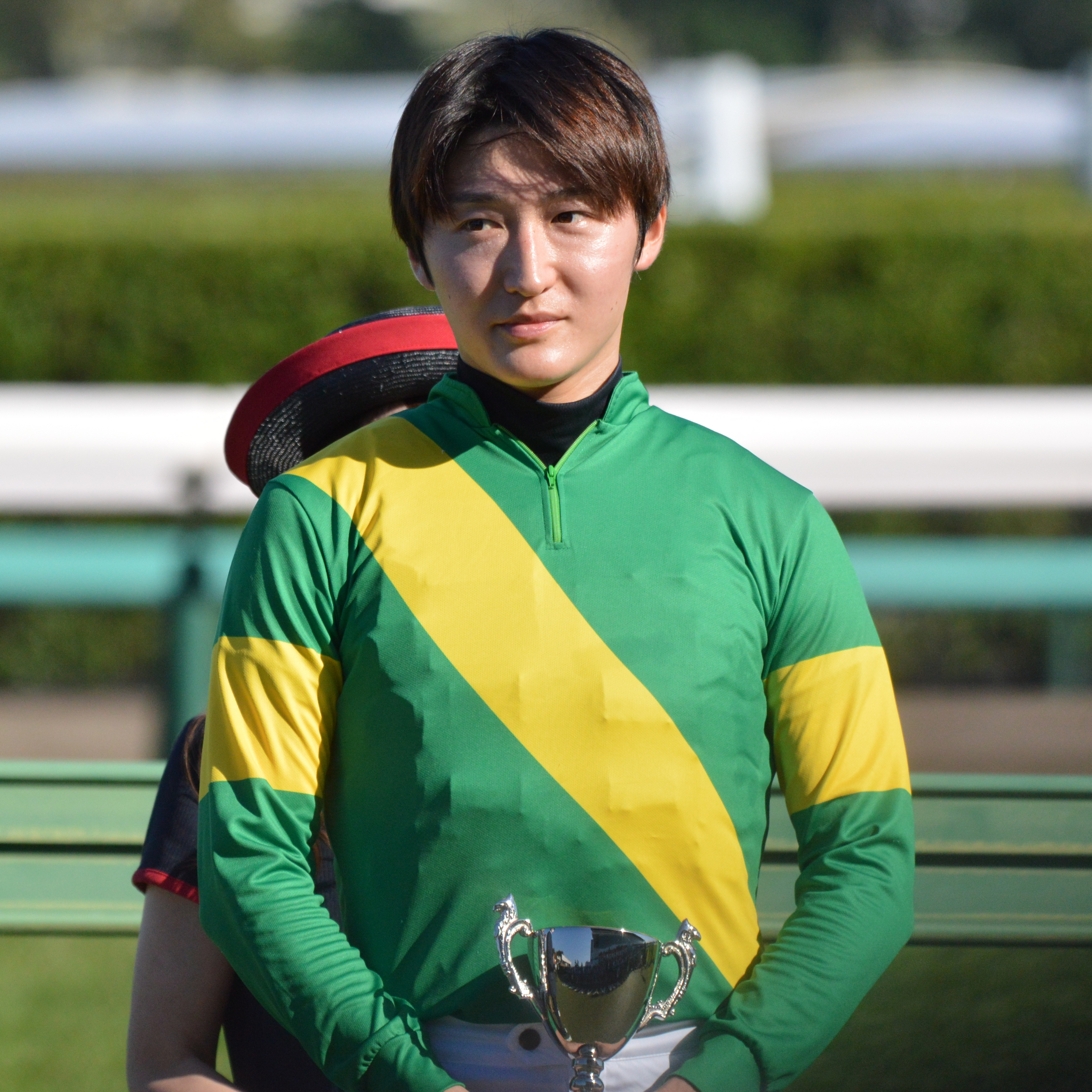
- Sameshima in 2022

Personal information
- Nationality: Japanese
- Born: October 18, 1996 (age 29) Saga Prefecture, Japan
- Occupation: Jockey

Horse racing career
- Sport: Horse racing
- Career wins: n/a

Racing awards
- n/a

Katsuma Sameshima (鮫島克駿) is an active Japanese jockey of Thoroughbred race horses.

== History ==
On August 25, 2024, he won the 9th race at Chukyo with Kazupeto Sheen, becoming the 34th active jockey to achieve 500 JRA wins in his 6,656th race.
