= Pine Bluff (horse) =

American Thoroughbred racehorse

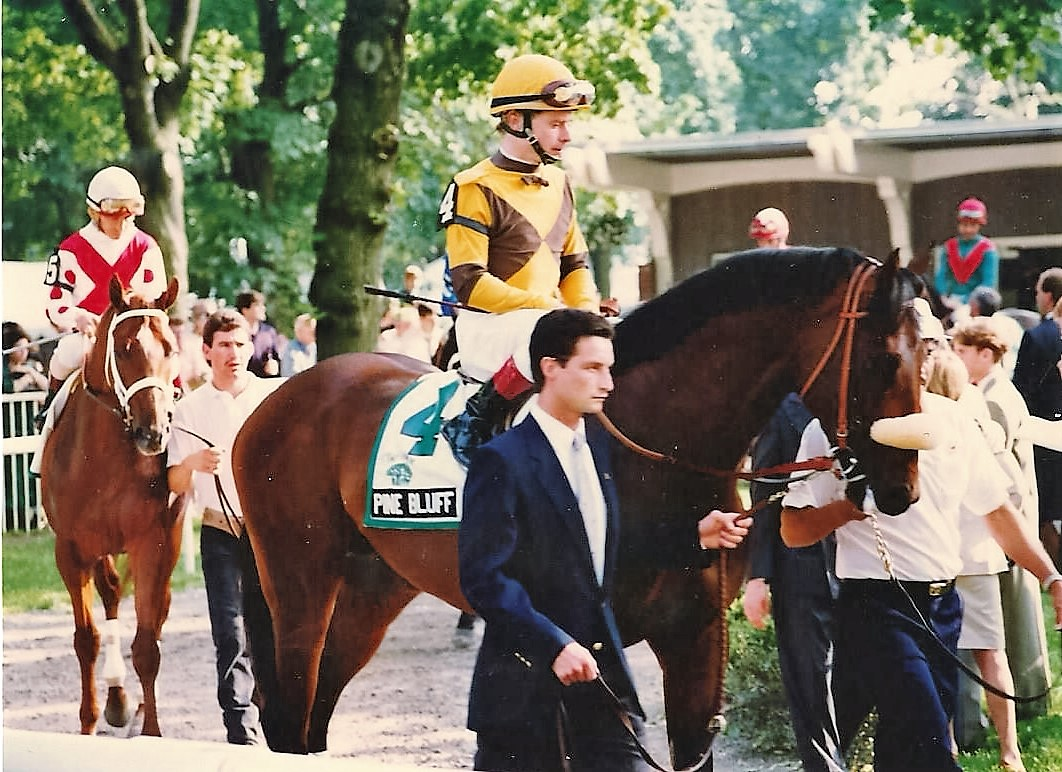
- Sire: Danzig
- Grandsire: Northern Dancer
- Dam: Rowdy Angel
- Damsire: Halo
- Sex: Stallion
- Foaled: 1989
- Country: United States
- Colour: Bay
- Breeder: Loblolly Stable
- Owner: Loblolly Stable
- Trainer: Tom Bohannan
- Record: 13: 6-1-4
- Earnings: $2,255,884

Major wins
- Remsen Stakes (1991); Nashua Stakes (1991); Rebel Stakes (1992); Arkansas Derby (1992) American Triple Crown Race wins: Preakness Stakes (1992)

Pine Bluff (foaled 1989 in Kentucky, died 2014) was an American Thoroughbred racehorse. Bred and raced by John Ed Anthony's Loblolly Stable, he was a son of Danzig and grandson of the 20th century's most important sire in the United States, Northern Dancer. His dam, Rowdy Angel, was a daughter of two-time North American Champion sire Halo.

== Early racing career ==
In his debut in 1991 at age 2, Pine Bluff broke his maiden, then was sent into graded stakes races. He was shipped to upstate New York, where he finished third in the grade one Champagne Stakes at Saratoga Race Course. In mid-September 1991, he finished third to future Preakness qualifier Agincourt of Nick Zito's stable in the seven-furlong grade one Futurity Stakes at Belmont Park. In late October, he won the Grade III Nashua Stakes over a mile on the grass at Aqueduct under jockey Craig Perret in 1:46.14. Pine Bluff finished the year in late November with a win in the grade two Remsen Stakes at Aqueduct Racetrack, finishing the mile and one eighth in 1:50.80 also under rider Craig Perret.

At age three, Pine Bluff was shipped to Arkansas, home of his owner John Ed Anthony and Loblolly Stable (based in Lake Hamilton, Arkansas) to race in the three-year-old series held at Oaklawn Park. In mid-February 1992, he started his sophomore campaign by running second in the one-mile Southwest Stakes to future Preakness qualifier Big Sur of D. Wayne Lukas's stable. In mid-March, he won the grade three Rebel Stakes with a time of 1:42.80 for the mile and one sixteenth with the nation's premier jockey, Jerry D. Bailey. In mid-April, Pine Bluff won the grade two Arkansas Derby by a neck over Lil E. Tee in a field of six. Bailey again rode him and won the mile and one eighth race in 1:49.40 over a fast track.

== 1992 Triple Crown series ==
Loblolly Stable entered Pine Bluff in the 1992 Kentucky Derby at Churchill Downs in Louisville, Kentucky, to be run the first Saturday in May. Eighteen runners were entered, but the buzz centered on the overwhelming favorite, Arazi. Pine Bluff was listed as the third choice at 5–1. Jockey Jerry Bailey chose to ride second choice Technology at 2–1; Craig Perret, who had previously ridden Pine Bluff, was hired for the Derby. He broke well and settled in fourth going in the turn. Nearing the end of the back stretch, Pine Bluff moved into second behind only Dance Floor, clocking the first 3/4 of a mile in 1:12.37. Moving into the home stretch, Pine Bluff remained a factor in a tight bunch of seven colts. In the last sixteenth of a mile, he lacked a late response when asked by Perret. Pine Bluff faded to fifth as Lil E. Tee, Casual Lies, and Dance Floor finished in the top three places. Odds-on favorite Arazi came in eighth at odds of .90–1.

Two weeks later, Pine Bluff was to start in the 1992 Preakness Stakes. The public made him the post-time favorite at 7–2. Pine Bluff had a new jockey, Chris McCarron. He broke slowly from gate four in very close quarters and settled in eighth in a full field of 14 horses, passing the stands for the first time behind leader Big Sur. Around the clubhouse turn, he moved up to sixth as leader Speakerphone finished the first half mile in :46-1/5. Down the back stretch, Pine Bluff worked his way to the outside of the field five wide and started advancing on the first flight of horses. He continued his rally at the top of the home stretch, pulling up to third. He brushed with Dance Floor inside the final furlong. He wore down the leader, Alydeed, and beat him at the wire by 3/4 of a length. Pine Bluff's win in the Preakness Stakes was the first of two straight Preakness wins for his trainer, Tom Bohannan, and owner Loblolly Stable and John Ed Anthony.

In the final leg of the Triple Crown series, Pine Bluff ran third behind A.P. Indy in the Belmont Stakes. He earned the $1 million bonus paid by Chrysler Corporation that went to the owner of the horse with the Highest combined Triple Crown finish as part of the Triple Crown Bonus Program. Pine Bluff finished with 13 points, ahead of Casual Lies with 8 points.

== Retirement and stud career ==
Pine Bluff's racing career ended a few weeks after the Belmont, when he took a misstep during a routine training run and tore a ligament in his left foreleg. He finished his racing career with a record of six wins, one second, and four third-place finishes in 13 starts for career earnings of $2,255,884. Pine Bluff's "in-the-money" percentage of 85% (11 of 13 races) ranked him among the top 20 thoroughbreds in history on the date of his retirement.

Retired to stud duty, he sired twenty-nine stakes race winners and was pensioned in 2006. Pine Bluff's progeny brought in earnings of $33,101,422. From 19 crops and 601 foals, he sired 32 black-type winners, 10 graded stakes winners, and one champion: Chef Michelle, in 1997 ranked as the top imported 3-year-old filly in Panama.

== Death ==
Pine Bluff was euthanized in early 2014 at age 25 due to deteriorating health.

== Pedigree ==
Pedigree of Pine Bluff
| Sire Danzig dark brown 1977 | Northern Dancer bay 1961 | Nearctic brown 1954 | Nearco |
| Sire Danzig dark brown 1977 | Northern Dancer bay 1961 | Nearctic brown 1954 | Lady Angela |
| Sire Danzig dark brown 1977 | Northern Dancer bay 1961 | Natalma bay 1957 | Native Dancer |
| Sire Danzig dark brown 1977 | Northern Dancer bay 1961 | Natalma bay 1957 | Almahmoud |
| Sire Danzig dark brown 1977 | Pas De Nom dark 1968 | Admiral's Voyage dark brown 1959 | Crafty Admiral |
| Sire Danzig dark brown 1977 | Pas De Nom dark 1968 | Admiral's Voyage dark brown 1959 | Olympia Lou |
| Sire Danzig dark brown 1977 | Pas De Nom dark 1968 | Petitioner bay 1952 | Petition |
| Sire Danzig dark brown 1977 | Pas De Nom dark 1968 | Petitioner bay 1952 | Steady Aim |
| Dam Rowdy Angel bay 1979 | Halo black 1969 | Hail to Reason brown 1958 | Turn-To |
| Dam Rowdy Angel bay 1979 | Halo black 1969 | Hail to Reason brown 1958 | Nothirdchance |
| Dam Rowdy Angel bay 1979 | Halo black 1969 | Cosmah bay 1953 | Cosmic Bomb |
| Dam Rowdy Angel bay 1979 | Halo black 1969 | Cosmah bay 1953 | Almahmoud |
| Dam Rowdy Angel bay 1979 | Ramhyde bay 1972 | Rambunctious bay 1960 | Rasper |
| Dam Rowdy Angel bay 1979 | Ramhyde bay 1972 | Rambunctious bay 1960 | Danae |
| Dam Rowdy Angel bay 1979 | Ramhyde bay 1972 | Castle Hyde bay 1968 | Tulyar |
| Dam Rowdy Angel bay 1979 | Ramhyde bay 1972 | Castle Hyde bay 1968 | Bold Irish |
