= Fountain of Youth Stakes =

American Thoroughbred horse race

- Class: Grade II
- Location: Gulfstream Park; Hallandale Beach, Florida
- Inaugurated: 1945
- Race type: Thoroughbred – Flat racing
- Sponsor: Coolmore Stud
- Website: www.gulfstreampark.com

Race information
- Distance: 1 1/16 miles (8 1/2 furlongs)
- Surface: Dirt
- Track: left-handed
- Qualification: Three-year-olds
- Weight: 124 lbs. with allowances
- Purse: $400,000 (since 2011)
- Bonuses: Qualifications points – Road to the Kentucky Derby

The Fountain of Youth Stakes is an American Thoroughbred horse race run annually at Gulfstream Park in Hallandale Beach, Florida in late February. A Grade II event open to three-year-olds willing to race one and one-sixteenth miles on the dirt, it currently offers a purse of $400,000. It is the final stakes prep to the Florida Derby and is an official prep race on the Road to the Kentucky Derby.

== History ==
The race was named for the mythical Florida spring that granted eternal youth. It was sought by Spanish explorer Ponce de Leon who searched throughout the southeastern United States for it without success.

The race has long been a major prep for the Kentucky Derby, with multiple horses being victorious in both races. Four colts, Tim Tam (1958), Kauai King (1966), Spectacular Bid (1979) and Thunder Gulch (1995), won this race then went on to become "Dual Classic Winners," the first three winning the Kentucky Derby and the Preakness Stakes, while the last won the Derby and the Belmont Stakes. The 1985 winner, Proud Truth, won that year's Breeders' Cup Classic. More recently, the race has been used as a prep for Derby winner Orb in 2013 and Belmont Stakes winner Union Rags in 2012.

== Records ==
Speed record:

- 1.41.00 @ 1-1/16 miles: Sensitive Prince (1978)
- 1:48.87 @ 1-1/8 miles: Eskendereya (2010)

Most wins by an owner:

- 3 - Calumet Farm (1957, 1958, 1961)
- 3 - Michael Tabor (1995, 2000, 2007)

Most wins by a jockey:

- 5 - John Velazquez (2007, 2009, 2010, 2013, 2019)

Most wins by a trainer:

- 4 - Todd A. Pletcher (2007, 2010, 2015, 2023)

== Winners ==
Year	Winner	Jockey	Trainer	Owner	Dist. (Miles) (Furlongs)	Time	Purse	Gr.
2026	Commandment	Irad Ortiz Jr.	Brad H. Cox	Wathnan Racing	1-1/16 M	1:43.33	$400,000	G2
2025	Sovereignty	Junior Alvarado	William I. Mott	Godolphin	1-1/6 M	1:43.12	$401,650	G2
2024	Dornoch	Luis Saez	Danny Gargan	West Paces Racing, R. A. Hill Stable, Belmar Racing & Breeding, Two Eight Racing, Pine Racing Stables	1-1/6 M	1:43.64	$400,000	G2
2023	Forte	Irad Ortiz Jr.	Todd A. Pletcher	Repole Stable & St. Elias Stable	1-1/6 M	1:43.12	$300,000	G2
2022	Simplification	José Ortiz	Antonio Sano	Tami Dellatore-Bobo	1-1/6 M	1:44.04	$300,000	G2
2021	Greatest Honour	José Ortiz	Claude R. McGaughey III	Courtlandt Farms (Donald & Donna Adam)	1-1/6 M	1:44.02	$300,000	G2
2020	Ete Indien	Florent Geroux	Patrick Biancone	Linda Shanahan, Sanford Bacon, Dream With Me Stable, Horse France America, D P Racing & Patrick Biancone Racing	1-1/16 M	1:43.02	$235,600	G2
2019	Code of Honor	John Velazquez	Claude R. McGaughey III	William S. Farish III	1-1/16 M	1:43.85	$233,120	G2
2018	Promises Fulfilled	Irad Ortiz Jr.	Dale Romans	Robert J. Baron	1-1/16 M	1:44.17	$238,080	G2
2017	Gunnevera	Javier Castellano	Antonio Sano	Peacock Racing Stables	1-1/16 M	1:44.25	$235,300	G2
2016	Mohaymen	Junior Alvarado	Kiaran McLaughlin	Shadwell Stable	1-1/16 M	1:42.84	$245,520	G2
2015	Itsaknockout †	Luis Saez	Todd A. Pletcher	Starlight Racing (Jack Wolf, m.p.)	1-1/16 M	1:46.28	$240,560	G2
2014	Wildcat Red	Luis Saez	Jose Garoffalo	Honors Stable Corp. (Salvatore Delfino & Josie Martino)	1-1/16 M	1:41.85	$255,000	G2
2013	Orb	John Velazquez	Claude R. McGaughey III	Stuart S. Janney III & Phipps Stable	1-1/16 M	1:42.24	$240,000	G2
2012	Union Rags	Julien Leparoux	Michael Matz	Chadds Ford Stable (Phyllis Mills Wyeth)	1-1/16 M	1:42.68	$240,000	G2
2011	Soldat	Alan Garcia	Kiaran McLaughlin	Harvey Clarke & W. Craig Robertson III	1-1/8 M	1:50.23	$240,000	G2
2010	Eskendereya	John Velazquez	Todd A. Pletcher	Zayat Stables	1-1/8 M	1:48.87	$150,000	G2
2009	Quality Road	John Velazquez	James A. Jerkens	Edward P. Evans	1 M	1:35.01	$150,000	G2
2008	Cool Coal Man	Kent Desormeaux	Nick Zito	Robert V. LaPenta	1-1/8 M	1:50.07	$210,000	G2
2007	Scat Daddy	John Velazquez	Todd A. Pletcher	James T. Scatuorchio & Michael Tabor	1-1/8 M	1:49.11	$180,000	G2
2006	First Samurai †	Edgar Prado	Frank L. Brothers	Bruce Lunsford & Lansdon B. Robbins III	1-1/8 M	1:49.00	$180,000	G2
2005	High Fly	Jerry D. Bailey	Nick Zito	Live Oak Racing (Charlotte Weber)	1-1/8 M	1:49.70	$180,000	G2
2004	Read the Footnotes	Jerry D. Bailey	Richard Violette	Klaravich Stables	1-1/16 M	1:42.71	$120,000	G2
2003	Trust n Luck	Cornelio Velásquez	Ralph Ziadie	E. Paul Robsham	1-1/16 M	1:43.33	$120,000	G1
2002	Booklet	Jorge Chavez	John T. Ward Jr.	John C. Oxley	1-1/16 M	1:44.49	$120,000	G1
2001	Songandaprayer	Edgar Prado	John F. Dowd	Bobby Hurley	1-1/16 M	1:43.48	$120,000	G1
2000	High Yield	Pat Day	D. Wayne Lukas	Michael Tabor & Bob & Beverly Lewis	1-1/16 M	1:42.56	$120,000	G1
1999	Vicar	Shane Sellers	Carl Nafzger	James B. Tafel	1-1/16 M	1:45.64	$120,000	G1
1998	Lil's Lad	Jerry D. Bailey	Neil J. Howard	Lillian Durst, William S. Farish III, Centennial Farm (Donald Little)	1-1/16 M	1:42.63	$120,000	G2
1997	Pulpit	Shane Sellers	Frank L. Brothers	Claiborne Farm	1-1/16 M	1:41.86	$120,000	G2
1996	Built For Pleasure	Gary Boulanger	Tommy Heard Jr.	Tommy Heard Jr.	1-1/16 M	1:43.64	$120,000	G2
1995	Thunder Gulch	Mike E. Smith	D. Wayne Lukas	Michael Tabor	1-1/16 M	1:43.21	$120,000	G2
1994	Dehere	Craig Perret	Reynaldo Nobles	Due Process Stable	1-1/16 M	1:44.70	$120,000	G2
1993-1	Duc d'Sligovil	Julie Krone	Jeremy McNeill	Ray McNeill	1-1/16 M	1:45.16	$113,094	G2
1993-2	Storm Tower	Rick Wilson	Benjamin W. Perkins Jr.	Charles Hesse	1-1/16 M	1:44.98	$113,094	G2
1992	Dance Floor	Chris Antley	D. Wayne Lukas	Oaktown Stable	1-1/16 M	1:45.32	$150,268	G2
1991	Fly So Free	José A. Santos	Scotty Schulhofer	Tommy & Elizabeth Valando	1-1/16 M	1:44.30	$73,737	G2
1990	Shot Gun Scott	Dave Penna	Ronald J. Sarazin	Jean Friedberg & A. Scott Hamilton	1-1/16 M	1:44.60	$77,427	G2
1989	Dixieland Brass	Randy Romero	Charles Peoples	Bayard Sharp & William S. Farish III	1-1/16 M	1:44.60	$130,000	G2
1988	Forty Niner	Eddie Maple	Woody Stephens	Claiborne Farm	1-1/16 M	1:43.20	$98,991	G2
1987	Bet Twice	Craig Perret	Warren Croll	Blanche P. Levy & Cisley Stable	1-1/16 M	1:43.40	$100,482	G2
1986-1	Ensign Rhythm	Julio Pezua	Leo Azpurua Jr.	Lushland Farm	1-1/16 M	1:45.60	$57,210	G2
1986-2	My Prince Charming	José A. Santos	Newcomb Green	Don Aronow	1-1/16 M	1:45.00	$58,060	G2
1985	Proud Truth	Jorge Velásquez	John M. Veitch	Darby Dan Farm	1-1/16 M	1:43.60	$106,860	G2
1984	Darn That Alarm	Mike Venezia	George Gianos	Robert N. Caporella	1-1/16 M	1:43.00	$73,200	G2
1983-1	Highland Park	Don Brumfield	Anthony L. Basile	Bwamazon Farm	1-1/16 M	1:44.60	$45,338	G2
1983-2	Copelan	Laffit Pincay Jr.	Mitch Griffin	Fred W. Hooper	1-1/16 M	1:43.60	$44,888	G2
1982	Star Gallant	Sandy Hawley	Leonard Imperio	Buckram Oak Farm (Mahmoud Fustok)	1-1/16 M	1:43.20	$54,630	G2
1981	Akureyri	Eddie Maple	Woody Stephens	Hickory Tree Stable	1-1/16 M	1:44.40	$47,697	G3
1980	Naked Sky	Jerry D. Bailey	Neal Winick	Maribel G. Blum	1-1/16 M	1:43.80	$29,820	G3
1979	'Spectacular Bid	Ron Franklin	Bud Delp	Hawksworth Farm (Harry & Teresa Meyerhoff)	1-1/16 M	1:41.20	$35,880	G3
1978	Sensitive Prince	Mickey Solomone	H. Allen Jerkens	Top the Marc Stable	1-1/16 M	1:41.00	$22,170	G3
1977	Ruthies Native	Craig Perret	Eugene Jacobs	Ruth A. Perlmutter	1-1/16 M	1:42.00	$26,010	G3
1976	Sonkisser	Braulio Baeza	Stephen DiMauro	Harold Snyder	1-1/16 M	1:43.80	$22,770	G3
1975	Greek Answer	Mickey Solomone	Frank H. Merrill Jr.	W. Preston Gilbride	1-1/16 M	1:42.80	$22,650	G3
1974	Green Gambados	Chuck Baltazar	John W. Jacobs	Harbor View Farm	1-1/16 M	1:42.40	$46,440	G3
1973	Shecky Greene	Braulio Baeza	Lou M. Goldfine	Joseph Kellman	1-1/16 M	1:43.80	$22,590	G3
1972	Gentle Smoke	Walter Blum	David Sazer	Forus Stable	1-1/16 M	1:42.00	$43,020	
1971	Authorize	Jacinto Vasquez	John W. Russell	Fred W. Hooper	1-1/16 M	1:42.60	$20,160	
1970	Corn off the Cob	Angel Cordero Jr.	Arnold N. Winick	Fence Post Farm	1-1/16 M	1:44.60	$24,950	
1969	Al Hattab	Ray Broussard	Warren A. Croll Jr.	Pelican Stable (Rachel Carpenter)	1-1/16 M	1:42.60	$13,925	
1968	Wise Exchange	Eddie Belmonte	Hirsch Jacobs	Isidor Bieber	1-1/16 M	1:43.80	$14,925	
1967	In Reality	Earlie Fires	Melvin Calvert	Frances A. Genter	1-1/16 M	1:44.40	$15,125	
1966	Kauai King	Don Brumfield	Henry Forrest	Ford Stable (Michael Ford)	1-1/16 M	1:43.20	$11,550	
1965	Maribeau	Sam Boulmetis	Joseph W. Mergler	Briardale Farm (Anthony Imbesi)	1-1/16 M	1:44.60	$11,275	
1964	Dandy K	Mickey Solomone	Robert E. Wingfield	Cecil Carmine	1-1/16 M	1:44.80	$11,075	
1963	Cool Prince	Jimmy Combest	Nick Combest	William G. Helis Jr.	1-1/16 M	1:45.80	$10,725	
1962	Sharp Count	Bill Shoemaker	Lester G. Joffrion	Reverie Knoll Farm (Freeman Keyes)	1-1/16 M	1:43.20	$10,400	
1961	Beau Prince	Eddie Arcaro	Jimmy Jones	Calumet Farm	1-1/16 M	1:43.20	$10,575	
1960	Eagle Admiral	Manuel Ycaza	Charles E. Whittingham	Llangollen Farm Stable	1-1/16 M	1:41.80	$10,675	
1959	Easy Spur	Bill Hartack	Paul L. Kelley	Spring Hill Farm	1-1/16 M	1:41.80	$10,400	
1958	Tim Tam	Bill Hartack	Jimmy Jones	Calumet Farm	1-1/16 M	1:42.80	$9,850	
1957	Gen. Duke	Bill Hartack	Jimmy Jones	Calumet Farm	1-1/16 M	1:44.00	$11,695	
1956	Oh Johnny	Hedley Woodhouse	Norman R. McLeod	Wallace Gilroy	1-1/16 M	1:44.20	$12,765	
1955	Nance's Lad	John Choquette	Hilton A. Dabson	Hilton A. Dabson & Chester J. Caithness	1-1/16 M	1:43.20	$13,550	
1954	Sea O Erin	John H. Adams	Harry Trotsek	Hasty House Farm	1-1/16 M	1:48.60	$11,800	
1953-1	Ram o' War	Douglas Dodson	Jerome J. Sarner Jr.	Bruce S. Campbell	1-1/16 M	1:42.60	$12,150	
1953-2	Tribe	Bennie Green	James W. Healy	Vera S. Bragg	1-1/16 M	1:43.40	$12,300	
1952	Race not held							
1951	Alerted	William M. Cook	James Penrod	Hampton Stable (Frank Stout)	7 F	1:24.20	$3,250	
1950	Black George	Kenneth Church	R. Earl Barnett	William H. Veeneman	7 F	1:23.40	$3,250	
1949	Count-a-Bit	Jack Robertson	George E. Roberts	Fred A. Blaser	1-1/16 M	1:44.20	$3,200	
1948	Race not held							
1947-1	Tight Squeeze	Rocco Sisto	Merritt C. Buxton	Rarco Stable (Mary Robinson)	6 F	1:11.80	$7,150	
1947-2	Atomic Power	Merritt A. Buxton	Merritt C. Buxton	Rarco Stable (Mary Robinson)	1 M, 70 yds.	1:40.60	$6,050	
1946	Race not held							
1945	Twenty Thirty	Robert Watson	Cecil Howard	Harry C. Hatch	1-1/16 M	1:45.20	$3,200	

- † 2015: Upstart finished first but was disqualified to second for impeding Itsaknockout in the stretch run.
- † 2006: Corinthian finished first but was disqualified to third for interference against both First Samurai and Flashy Bull.

== See also ==
- Fountain of Youth Stakes top three finishers and starters
- Road to the Kentucky Derby
