= Dance Floor (horse) =

American-bred Thoroughbred racehorse

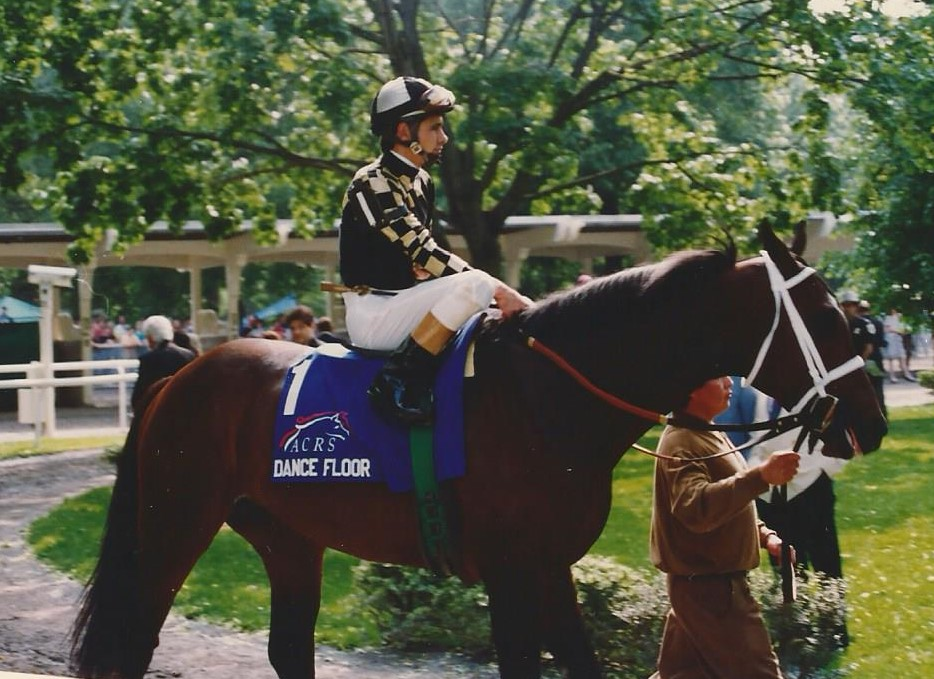
- Dance Floor in 1992
- Sire: Star de Naskra
- Grandsire: Naskra
- Dam: Dance Troupe
- Damsire: Native Charger
- Sex: Stallion
- Foaled: 1989
- Country: United States
- Colour: Bay
- Breeder: William A. Purdey
- Owner: Oaktown Stable
- Trainer: D. Wayne Lukas
- Record: 16: 4-4-2
- Earnings: US$863,299

Major wins
- Breeders' Futurity Stakes (1991); Kentucky Jockey Club Stakes (1991); Fountain of Youth Stakes (1992)

Dance Floor (foaled 1989 in New Jersey) is a retired American Thoroughbred racehorse. He was bred by William Purdey at his Greenfields Farm in Colts Neck Township, New Jersey. Out of the mare, Dance Troupe, a granddaughter of U.S. racing Hall of fame inductee, Native Dancer, Dance Floor was sired by Star de Naskra, the 1979 American Champion Sprint Horse.

Hall of Fame trainer D. Wayne Lukas conditioned Dance Floor for owner MC Hammer, a rap singer who raced him under his Oaktown Stable banner. At age two, Dance Floor was one of the top colts in the United States, winner of the 1991 Breeders' Futurity Stakes and Kentucky Jockey Club Stakes and runner-up in the Hollywood Futurity. Sent off as the bettors' third choice in the Breeders' Cup Juvenile, he finished sixth under jockey Pat Day to winner Arazi in one of the most memorable wins in Breeders' Cup history.

Racing at age three, Dance Floor won Florida's Fountain of Youth Stakes, was second in the Florida Derby, and third in the Kentucky Derby and Travers Stakes.

Dance Floor was sold to breeders who retired him to stud duty in New Zealand.

== Pedigree ==
Pedigree of Dance Floor, bay colt, February 23, 1989
Sire Star de Naskra	Naskra	Nasram	Nasrullah
Sire Star de Naskra	Naskra	Nasram	La Mirambule
Sire Star de Naskra	Naskra	Iskra	Le Haar
Sire Star de Naskra	Naskra	Iskra	Fasciola
Sire Star de Naskra	Candle Star	Clandestine	Double Jay
Sire Star de Naskra	Candle Star	Clandestine	Conniver
Sire Star de Naskra	Candle Star	Star Minstrel	Tudor Minstrel
Sire Star de Naskra	Candle Star	Star Minstrel	Ballochbuie
Dam Dance Troupe	Native Charger	Native Dancer	Polynesian
Dam Dance Troupe	Native Charger	Native Dancer	Geisha
Dam Dance Troupe	Native Charger	Greek Blond	Heliopolis
Dam Dance Troupe	Native Charger	Greek Blond	Peroxide
Dam Dance Troupe	Daystar	Seductor	Full Sail
Dam Dance Troupe	Daystar	Seductor	Suma
Dam Dance Troupe	Daystar	Good Star	Masked Light
Dam Dance Troupe	Daystar	Good Star	Bambuca (family: 7)
