= English Channel (horse) =

American Thoroughbred racehorse

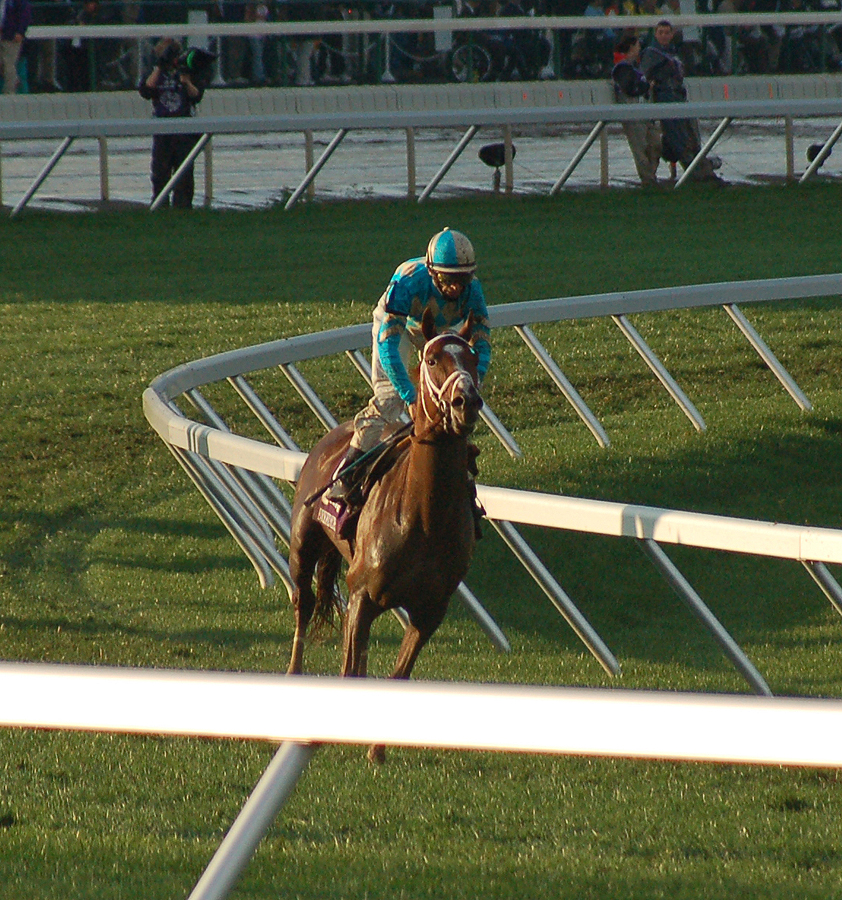
- Sire: Smart Strike
- Grandsire: Mr. Prospector
- Dam: Belva
- Damsire: Theatrical
- Sex: Stallion
- Foaled: April 9, 2002
- Country: United States
- Colour: Chestnut
- Breeder: Keene Ridge Farm
- Owner: James T. Scatuorchio
- Trainer: Todd Pletcher
- Record: 23:13-4-1
- Earnings: $5,199,028

Major wins
- Virginia Derby (2005); Colonial Turf Cup (2005); Woodlawn Stakes (2005); United Nations Stakes (2006, 2007); Turf Classic Stakes (2006); Joe Hirsch Turf Classic Invitational Handicap (2006, 2007); Canadian Turf Handicap (2006); Breeders' Cup Turf (2007)

Awards
- American Champion Male Turf Horse (2007)
- Last updated on October 27, 2007

English Channel (April 9, 2002 – November 11, 2021) was an American Champion Thoroughbred racehorse and a leading sire of turf horses in North America. In four years of racing, he competed in 23 races, winning 13, finishing second in four, and finishing third in one. His final victory came at the 2007 Breeders' Cup Turf, where he set a record for this race when he won by seven lengths. Following this race, he was retired to stud in Lexington, Kentucky.

== Background ==
Bred in Kentucky by Keene Ridge Farm, English Channel was sired by Smart Strike out of the Theatrical mare Belva. He was sold at the 2003 Keeneland September Sale for $50,000 to James T. Scatuorchio. He was trained by Todd Pletcher.

== Racing career ==
=== Two-Year-Old Campaign ===
English Channel made his first start at the age of two in a 1 1/16 mile maiden race on the turf at Saratoga. Ridden by John Velazquez, he got off to a slow start, running midpack almost throughout before accelerating to the lead and pulling away to break his maiden by a length.

=== Three-Year-Old Campaign ===
Seven months later, in March 2005, English Channel made his second career start in an allowance at Gulfstream Park. Once again he ran midpack, but unlike in his maiden race, he was unable to close ground on the eventual winner, Drum Major, and finished fourth. Exactly one month later, English Channel ran in an allowance at Keeneland Race Course. After making a four-wide sweeping move, he ran at the front of the pack, taking the lead and recording a 5 3/4 length victory.

On Preakness day at Pimlico, English Channel made his stakes debut in the listed Woodlawn Stakes. After running much of the race in traffic, he charged into the lead and pulled away, winning by 4 lengths, marking his first career stakes victory, his second straight victory by more than three lengths, and his third overall victory.

In June 2005, Pletcher pointed the horse to the inaugural Colonial Turf Cup at Colonial Downs to try for the first leg of the Grand Slam of Grass. Currently a Grade II event, the race was a listed stakes in its first year. Running on the outside in third during the opening portions of the race, English Channel took the lead and pulled away from his competitors to score his third straight victory.

English Channel then attempted the second leg of the Grand Slam, running in the Virginia Derby, once again at Colonial Downs. This race was his graded-stakes debut, as the Virginia Derby was a Grade III event at that time. After taking a few missteps on the backstretch, he recovered and won by 3 1/4 lengths, marking his fourth straight victory and his first career graded stakes win.

From Colonial Downs, the Grand Slam of Grass moved to Arlington Park for the third leg: the Secretariat Stakes. Going into the race as the favorite in his Grade I debut, English Channel was halfway to becoming the first horse to complete the Grand Slam of Grass. After racing alongside Purim, English Channel was overtaken by Gun Salute, who had been following the leaders in third. Gun Salute pulled away slightly, beating English Channel to the wire by 1 3/4 lengths.

A narrow defeat followed in the Turf Classic Invitational at Belmont Park. Making his first start against older horses, English Channel lost by a head bob to Shakespeare after the horses raced alongside each other through the closing stages.

Rounding out his three-year-old campaign, English Channel ran fifth in the Breeders' Cup Turf after tiring in the stretch, only the second time in his career he had finished outside of the top two.

=== Four-year-old campaign ===
English Channel began 2006 in the same place that he began 2005 – Gulfstream Park. Going off as the 9-5 favorite in the Canadian Turf Handicap, he ran in second through much of the race, taking the lead in the stretch and holding off Miesque's Approval to win by three-quarters of a length.

After a two-month layoff, English Channel shipped to Churchill Downs to again try to win a Grade I stakes. In the Turf Classic Stakes, he stalked the pace in third and took the lead in the stretch, holding off the challenge of Cacique to record his first Grade I victory by half a length.

English Channel then headed back to Belmont for the Manhattan Handicap. After stalking the pace in his usual style, he finished fourth, with Cacique winning.

A month later, English Channel ran for the first time at Monmouth Park. In the United Nations Stakes, he raced in fourth for most of the race before taking the lead in the stretch. In a repeat of their earlier meeting at Churchill Downs, English Channel held off Cacique to win by a half length.

In his next race, English Channel made his first attempt at the Arlington Million. While he and Cacique raced in third and fourth, The Tin Man, an eight-year-old son of Affirmed, set a pace so slow that some later described it as "murder". The slow pace enabled The Tin Man to conserve energy and win. English Channel did not rally as usual and finished fourth, slightly more than two lengths behind the winner.

Pletcher ran English Channel in one final prep before the Breeders' Cup, the Hirsch at Belmont, a race in which he was narrowly defeated the previous year. Co-entry Icy Atlantic took the lead and set a slow pace while English Channel ran on the outside. When they hit the stretch, English Channel moved strongly to take the lead, pulling away to win by 4 1/2 lengths.

In 2006, the Breeders' Cup was at Churchill Downs, the same location as English Channel's first career Grade I win. Considered a favorite to win the race, he finished third, over two lengths behind winner Red Rocks, with Better Talk Now in second.

=== Five-Year Old Campaign ===
English Channel returned for another season in 2007, making his first start in a Thursday afternoon allowance at Gulfstream. He won, setting a course record for 1 1/8 miles and missing the world record by 0.59 seconds.

Next, joining fellow American horses Lava Man and Miesque's Approval, English Channel shipped to Nad Al Sheba in Dubai to run in the Dubai Duty Free Stakes. He ran the worst race of his career, finishing in 12th place.

His next start came in the Manhattan. English Channel led in the stretch and held off challenges from the outside, only for Better Talk Now to squeeze by on the inside, beating him to the wire by a head.

In his next start, a prep for the upcoming Breeders' Cup at Monmouth Park, English Channel attempted to defend his title in the United Nations against one of the country's top mares, stablemate Honey Ryder. English Channel beat Honey Ryder by a length with Better Talk Now well beaten. In addition, he set a course record with his victory.

English Channel then returned to Saratoga, where he had not run since breaking his maiden as a two-year-old. In the Sword Dancer Invitational Stakes, "The Graveyard of Champions" lived up to its reputation, as long shot Grand Couturier won by three lengths. English Channel finished second.

With just one stakes win in 2007, he returned to Belmont, a track that he had only won at once in five starts despite going off on more than one occasion as the favorite. In the Turf Classic Invitational, he went off as the 2-5 favorite. Running his usual race just behind the leaders, English Channel was blocked entering the stretch but then found a gap and accelerated through it, catching the leader and pulling away to win by 2 1/4 lengths.

Coming off of his win in the Turf Classic, English Channel made his third attempt at the Breeders' Cup Turf. Going off as the second favorite behind odds-on favorite Dylan Thomas, he ran just off the lead and went to the front in the straight, pulling away from second-place Shamdinan to win. The seven-length victory was the largest of his career and the largest winning margin in Breeders' Cup Turf history. The horse was then retired to stud for the 2008 season at Hurricane Hall Farm in Lexington, Kentucky. He currently stands at Lanes End in Versailles, Kentucky.

At maturity, he reached 15.3 hands (63 inches, 160 cm) high. This height is generally smaller than most grade 1 winning American dirt horses, but as former jockey and journalist Zoe Cadman noted, "Turf horses- don't write them off for their size or anything. They can be diminutive. They can be tiny. Look at English Channel. ... I'll never forget the first time I saw English Channel...He walked into the paddock and I'm like, 'Good God! He's about 14.3.' ... And he won."

== Racing summary ==
Finish	Race	Distance	Track	Date
1st	Breeders' Cup Turf	One and One-Half Miles	Monmouth Park	October 27, 2007
1st	Joe Hirsch Turf Classic Invitational Handicap	One and One-Half Miles	Belmont Park	September 30, 2007
2nd	Sword Dancer Handicap	One and One-Half Miles	Saratoga Race Course	August 11, 2007
1st	United Nations Stakes	One and Three-Eighths Miles	Monmouth Park	July 7, 2007
2nd	Manhattan Handicap	One and One-Quarter Miles	Belmont Park	June 9, 2007
12th	Dubai Duty Free Stakes	One Mile, 194 Yards	Nad Al Sheba Racecourse	March 31, 2007
1st	Allowance	One and One-Eighth Miles	Gulfstream Park	February 22, 2007
3rd	Breeders' Cup Turf	One and One-Half Miles	Churchill Downs	November 4, 2006
1st	Joe Hirsch Turf Classic Invitational Handicap	One and One-Half-Miles	Belmont Park	October 7, 2006
4th	Arlington Million	One and One-Quarter Miles	Arlington Park	August 12, 2006
1st	United Nations Stakes	One and Three-Eighths Miles	Monmouth Park	July 8, 2006
2nd	Manhattan Handicap	One and One-Quarter Miles	Belmont Park	June 10, 2006
1st	Turf Classic Stakes	One and One-Eighth Miles	Churchill Downs	May 6, 2006
1st	Canadian Turf Handicap	One and One-Sixteenth Miles	Gulfstream Park	March 11, 2006
5th	Breeders' Cup Turf	One and One-Half Miles	Belmont Park	October 29, 2005
2nd	Joe Hirsch Turf Classic Invitational Handicap	One and One-Half Miles	Belmont Park	October 1, 2005
2nd	Secretariat Stakes	One and One-Quarter Miles	Arlington Park	August 13, 2005
1st	Virginia Derby	One and One-Quarter Miles	Colonial Downs	July 16, 2005
1st	Colonial Turf Cup	One and Three-Sixteenths Miles	Colonial Downs	June 25, 2005
1st	Woodlawn Stakes	One and One-Sixteenth Miles	Pimlico Race Course	May 21, 2005
1st	Allowance	One and One-Sixteenth Miles	Keeneland Race Course	April 13, 2005
4th	Allowance	One Mile	Gulfstream Park	March 13, 2005
1st	Maiden Special Weight	One and One-Sixteenth Miles	Saratoga Race Course	August 6, 2004

== Stud career ==
English Channel retired to stud for the 2008 season at Hurricane Hall near Lexington for an initial fee of $25,000 per live foal. His first crop, foaled in 2009, included 14 stakes winners, led by Canadian champion 3-year-old male Strait of Dover and Parranda, a Group I winner in Singapore. English Channel's third crop was led by V. E. Day, winner of the 2014 Travers Stakes.

English Channel's offspring have been successful on dirt, synthetic surfaces and turf. Like him, English Channel's offspring are not typically precocious but mature with age. A prime example is The Pizza Man, who was winless at two then became a Grade I winner at ages six and seven.

English Channel was relocated to Lane's End Farm for the 2010 season and then to Calumet Farm in 2014. Ken Wilkins, the director of Calumet's stallion division, said he can usually spot English Channel's offspring:"They are not real, real big horses because he is not a real big horse. But they are very much like him. Well balanced, with some bone to them, nice legs, and they are racehorses."

In 2020, English Channel was the leading turf sire in North America, led by the success of multiple-Grade I winner Channel Maker.

On November 10, 2021, English Channel's health started to rapidly decline and he died on the morning of November 11, 2021 at Rood and Riddle Equine Hospital. At the time of his death, he was the leading turf sire in North America for 2021.

=== Notable Progeny ===
English Channel has currently sired 11 individual Grade 1 winners:

'c = colt, f = filly, g = gelding

Foaled	Name	Sex	Major Wins
2009	The Pizza Man	g	Arlington Million, Northern Dancer Turf Stakes
2011	Al's Gal	f	E. P. Taylor Stakes
2011	Heart to Heart	c	Gulfstream Park Mile Stakes, Maker's Mark Mile Stakes
2011	Interpol	c	Northern Dancer Turf Stakes
2011	Johnny Bear	g	Northern Dancer Turf Stakes (twice)
2011	V. E. Day	c	Travers Stakes
2014	Channel Maker	g	Joe Hirsch Turf Classic Invitational Stakes (twice), Man o' War Stakes, Sword Dancer Stakes
2014	Voodoo Song	c	Fourstardave Handicap
2015	Channel Cat	h	Man o' War Stakes
2016	Two Emmys	g	Arlington Million
2017	Faenon	c	Gran Premio Nacional Augusto B. Leguia
2017	War Like Goddess	f	Flower Bowl Stakes, Joe Hirsch Turf Classic
2020	Far Bridge	c	Belmont Derby, Sword Dancer Stakes
2020	Last Call	f	Natalma Stakes

== Pedigree ==
English Channel is by Smart Strike, who was the leading sire in North America in both 2007 and 2008. Smart Strike is a half brother to Canadian Horse of the Year Dance Smartly and was one of Mr. Prospector's best sire sons. In addition to English Channel, Smart Strike was also the sire of two-time Horse of the Year Curlin.

Pedigree of English Channel
Sire Smart Strike	Mr. Prospector	Raise a Native	Native Dancer
Sire Smart Strike	Mr. Prospector	Raise a Native	Raise You
Sire Smart Strike	Mr. Prospector	Gold Digger	Nashua
Sire Smart Strike	Mr. Prospector	Gold Digger	Sequence
Sire Smart Strike	Classy 'n Smart	Smarten	Cyane
Sire Smart Strike	Classy 'n Smart	Smarten	Smartaire
Sire Smart Strike	Classy 'n Smart	No Class	Nodouble
Sire Smart Strike	Classy 'n Smart	No Class	Classy Quillo
Dam Belva	Theatrical	Nureyev	Northern Dancer
Dam Belva	Theatrical	Nureyev	Special
Dam Belva	Theatrical	Tree of Knowledge	Sassafras
Dam Belva	Theatrical	Tree of Knowledge	Sensibility
Dam Belva	Committed	Hagley	Olden Times
Dam Belva	Committed	Hagley	Teo Pepi
Dam Belva	Committed	Mistinguette	Boldnesian
Dam Belva	Committed	Mistinguette	Royal Warrant
