= Court Vision =

American Thoroughbred racehorse

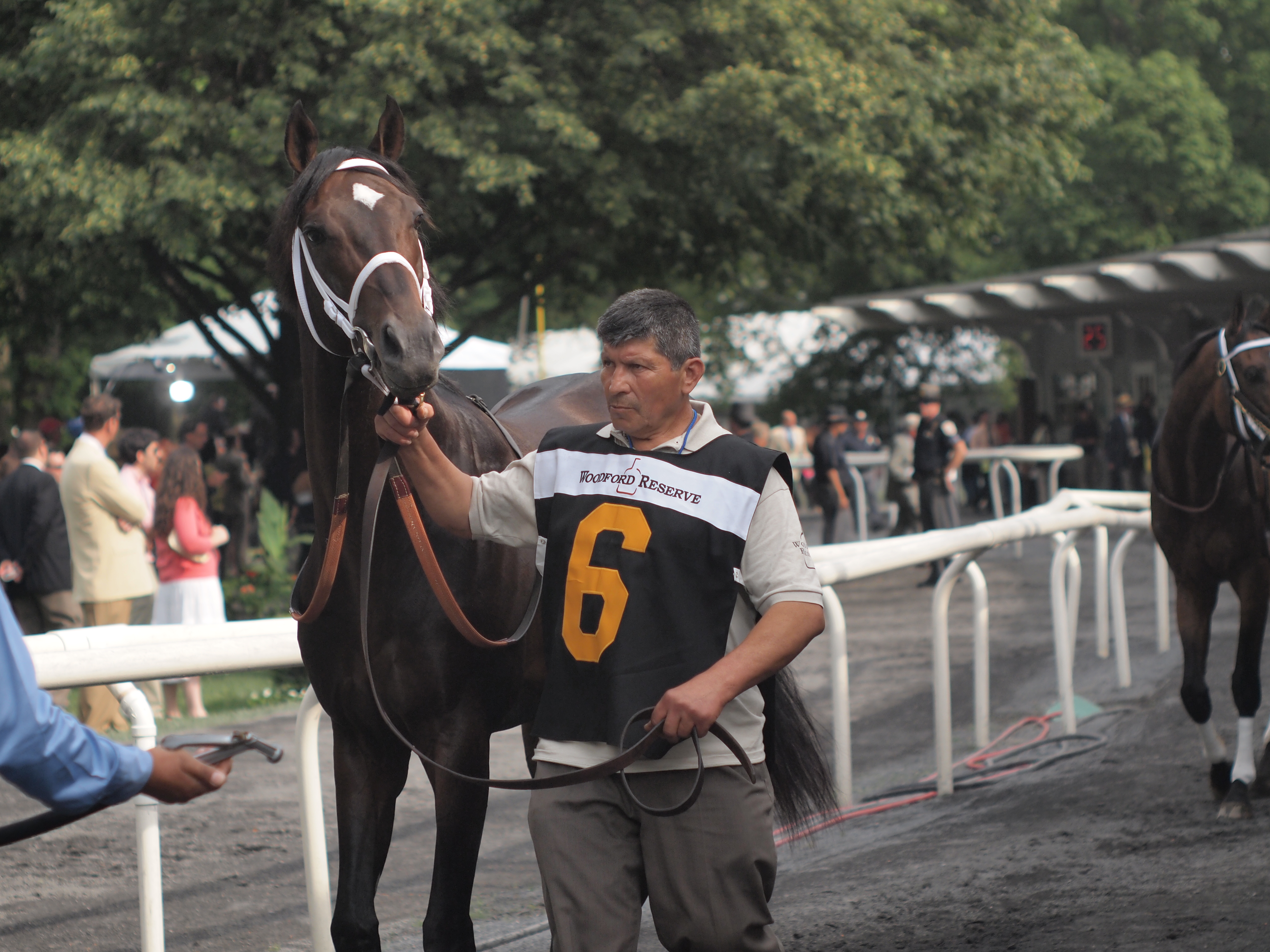
- Court Vision before the Manhattan Handicap
- Sire: Gulch
- Grandsire: Mr. Prospector
- Dam: Weekend Storm
- Damsire: Storm Bird
- Sex: Stallion
- Foaled: March 27, 2005
- Country: United States
- Colour: Dark bay
- Breeder: W. S. Farish & Kilroy Thoroughbred Partnership
- Owner: WinStar Farm (2007); WinStar & IEAH Stables (2008–11); Spendthrift Farm
- Trainer: William Mott (2007–2009); Richard Dutrow (2009–2011); Dale Romans (2011)
- Record: 31: 9-4-4
- Earnings: $3,746,658

Major wins
- Iroquois Stakes (2007); Remsen Stakes (2007); Jamaica Handicap (2008); Hollywood Derby (2008); Shadwell Turf Mile (2009); Gulfstream Park Turf Handicap (2010); Woodbine Mile (2010); Breeders' Cup wins: Breeders' Cup Mile (2011)

Court Vision (foaled March 27, 2005 in Kentucky) is a retired racehorse who was a five-time Grade I winner including the Breeders' Cup Mile. Upon retirement to stud in 2012, he first stood in Ontario, then was moved to Kentucky for 2016 then Louisiana for 2017.

He started racing on the dirt and showed promise as a two-year-old by winning the Iroquois and Remsen Stakes. As a three-year-old, he was entered in the Kentucky Derby but finished thirteenth. He was subsequently switched to racing on the turf, on which he won at least one Grade I race each year from age three to six. His win in the Breeders' Cup Mile in 2011 was his third try in the event.

== Background ==
Court Vision is a dark bay racehorse bred by William S. Farish of Lane's End Farm and Kilroy Thoroughbred Partnership. He is by champion sprinter Gulch out of the Storm Bird mare Weekend Storm. Weekend Storm was a full sister to 1990 Preakness Stakes winner Summer Squall and a half-sister to 1992 Horse of the Year A.P. Indy. All three horses were produced by 1992 Kentucky Broodmare of the Year Weekend Surprise, a stakes winning daughter of Secretariat. Like A.P. Indy, Court Vision was a ridgling, meaning he had one undescended testicle.

Court Vision was sold as a yearling in 2006 at the Keeneland September sale for $180,000, then resold as a two-year-old in training at the Fasig-Tipton February sale for $350,000. He originally ran for WinStar Farm under trainer William Mott. In 2008, WinStar sold a portion to IEAH Stables, who later moved the colt to trainer Richard Dutrow. In August 2011, he was privately purchased by Spendthrift Farm and placed under the care of Dale Romans.

The colt was named for one of the characteristics of a good basketball player. WinStar president Doug Cauthen explained, "The point guard on a basketball team has to have court vision, to be athletic and intelligent, which we think he is."

== Career ==
=== 2007: 2-year-old-season ===
Though subsequently known as a turf horse, Court Vision originally raced on dirt. He finished second in his first start on September 7, 2007, at Turfway Park, then won in his second start on October 7 at Keeneland by 2 1/2 lengths. On October 28, he stepped up to graded stakes company in the Iroquois Stakes at Churchill Downs. At odds of 8–1, he trailed the early leaders while saving ground, then swung wide in the stretch and powered his way to win by half a length. "I was behind", said jockey Julien Leparoux. "I was very frustrated at the start. But he came running. The trip was good because we saved ground the whole way. They came back to me, and he had a good kick."

Court Vision's final start of the year was the Grade II Remsen Stakes at Aqueduct Racetrack on November 24. He put in a "tremendous" run after being blocked at the head of the stretch and then bumping with several horses. "I was getting bounced all over from the five-sixteenths pole to the three-sixteenths pole", said jockey Eibar Coa. "He fought back and pushed them out because they were trying to push him in. To overcome that, you saw the way he kicked. He was just much the best."

The two stakes wins made Court Vision one of the early favorites in the future wagering for the Kentucky Derby, along with the champion two-year-old colt War Pass and the Breeders' Cup Juvenile runner-up Pyro.

=== 2008: 3-year-old-season ===
Court Vision made the first start of his three-year-old campaign in the Fountain of Youth Stakes on February 24, closing from far back to finish third. He finished third in the Wood Memorial on April 5 after having difficulty finding his footing on a drying, "greasy" track. Mott shipped the colt to Churchill Downs to train for the Kentucky Derby and added blinkers – the colt responded with an outstanding workout that brought him back into consideration for the big race. In the Derby however, Court Vision was bumped and carried wide into the first turn, then failed to mount his usual closing drive, finishing thirteenth.

After a brief layoff, Court Vision returned in the Colonial Turf Cup on June 24 at Colonial Downs, finishing fourth on a turf course softened by heavy rain. On July 19 when racing on a firm turf course, he improved to finish second in the Grade II Virginia Derby, losing by a nose to Gio Ponti. Mott decided to switch the colt back to dirt for the Travers Stakes, but Court Vision finished sixth after a wide trip.

On October 4, Mott switched Court Vision back to turf in the Jamaica Handicap at Aqueduct, where he beat Gio Ponti by 3/4 of a length after an eventful trip. "There was a lot of bouncing going on", said jockey Ramon Domínguez, "but between the five-eighths pole and the half-mile pole, he got pretty rank and pushed his way out and bumped into Gio Ponti. After that, Gio Ponti decided to (move to the rail) and save the ground. I positioned my horse on the outside, hoping to get a clear trip. Sure enough, Gio Ponti was second around the turn and had to check again... (Court Vision) drew off pretty nicely on the last part and we certainly had a great trip as well."

Court Vision finished the year by winning his first Grade I race, the Hollywood Derby. Racing in last place behind a slow early pace, Court Vision rallied in the stretch to win by 3/4 of a length. His time on a firm turf course was 2:01.42 for 1 1/4 miles.

=== 2009: 4-year-old-season ===
In 2009, Court Vision ran nine times at the Grade I level, winning once and finishing third twice before a fourth-place finish in the Breeders cup Mile. On March 7, he tried racing on the dirt one last time but could only finish seventh in the Santa Anita Handicap. After a bad loss in the United Nations Stakes, he underwent surgery in July to remove his undescended testicle. He returned to the track in October, now trained by Richard Dutrow, and won the Shadwell Turf Mile Stakes by a nose over Karelian. "He was very close (to the pace) for him, doing it easy", said jockey Robby Albarado. "I figured the fractions were slow and I knew this horse would finish up big, and he did. He faced some quality horses in the past, including Gio Ponti. He's got quite a bit of back class."

=== 2010: 5-year-old-season ===
In 2010, Court Vision raced seven times and earned two Grade I wins in the Gulfstream Park Turf Handicap and the Woodbine Mile. He also finished second in both the Maker's Mark Mile and the Woodford Reserve Turf Classic Stakes, but later finished fifth in the Breeders' Cup Mile.

The highlight of the year was his win in the Woodbine Mile on September 19, where he rallied from far back to win by 1 1/4 lengths. "He ran an awful nice race today", said Albarado. "Court Vision is such a cool horse to ride. We were both coming off a long layoff but it worked out well for us. I just wanted him to settle in early. I know he's been off awhile but he was training forwardly at Saratoga this summer. You give him a good trip, he's going to come home and he did."

=== 2011: 6-year-old-season ===
Leading up to the Breeders' Cup Mile, Court Vision had finished out of the money in each of his four starts in 2011. In the Mile, he was dismissed as a longshot in a field that included Goldikova (looking for an unprecedented fourth win in the Mile), Gio Ponti (champion male turf horse of 2009 and 2010), Turallure (winner of the 2011 Woodbine Mile), Courageous Cat (runner-up in the Woodbine Mile) and several other group or graded stakes winners.

The track at Churchill Downs was rated as good, softened by earlier rain. By post time, Court Vision's odds had drifted from 30–1 on the morning line to 64–1. He settled at the back of the pack with Turallure behind a slow early pace. Goldikova got a poor start but advanced to fifth behind the early leaders, then started her kick with a quarter of a mile remaining, reaching the lead by mid-stretch. Court Vision and Turallure were in tenth and thirteenth position at the quarter-pole but accelerated rapidly while racing wide, catching Goldikova in deep stretch. Court Vision and Turallure then battled to the wire with Court Vision prevailing by a nose. Goldikova was a length back in third with Gio Ponti in fourth.

Court Vision paid $131.60 for a $2 win bet – the second highest payout (to Arcangues in 1990) in the history of the Breeders' Cup.

"I’ve loved Court Vision since he was a 2-year-old", said Romans, who had taken over training the colt for only a few months before the Mile. "We saw him at the sales and have been following him. I’ve been saying all week how good this horse was doing. When I saw how easy he was running down the backside, I thought if they just back up a little we’ve got a hell of a shot."

== Retirement ==
After the Breeders' Cup Mile, Court Vision was retired to stud. He first stood at Michael Byrne's Park Stud in Ontario, Canada under lease from Spendthrift Farm. He was moved to Spendthrift's main farm in central Kentucky for 2016.

In November 2016, Court Vision was sold to a Louisiana-based investment group. For 2017, he stood at Acadiana Equine at Copper Crowne near Opelousas, Louisiana. "He has arguably as a good a pedigree as anyone considering his dam is a sister to A.P. Indy", said David Tillson, a representative of the new ownership group. Tillson said Court Vision should fit well with the speed-oriented mares that dominate the breeding programs in Louisiana, Arkansas, Oklahoma, Texas, and New Mexico. "To bring in a stallion that that has started 31 times is a big deal", he said "We have speed, we have precocity, and you definitely getting soundness from this family."

Court Vision's first crop reached racing age in 2015 and made him the leading freshman sire in Canada. In November 2016, his son King and His Court won the prestigious Coronation Futurity for Canadian-bred two-year-olds to become his leading earner. In 2020, Court Vision's son Art Collector won the Ellis Park Derby and Blue Grass Stakes.

Court Vision first Grade 1 winner was Storm the Court, who won the 2019 Breeders' Cup Juvenile.
