= Test Score =

American racehorse (foaled 2022)

- Sire: Lookin At Lucky
- Grandsire: Smart Strike
- Dam: Joy of Learning
- Damsire: Kitten's Joy
- Foaled: April 27, 2022 (age 4)
- Country: United States
- Color: Bay
- Breeder: Mrs. Jerry Amerman
- Owner: Amerman Racing, LLC
- Trainer: H. Graham Motion
- Record: 14: 5 - 3 -3
- Earnings: $2,015,025

Major wins
- Twilight Derby (2025); Belmont Derby Invitational Stakes (2025); Pegasus World Cup Turf (2026)
- Last updated on May 4th, 2026

Test Score is a winning horse for the Pegasus World Cup Invitational Stakes bred by Mrs. Jerry Amerman and owned by Amerman Racing, LLC.

== Background ==
Test Score is a bay horse bred by Mrs. Jerry Amerman. He is by the Lookin At Lucky and Joy of Learning. He had multiple Grade I race wins such as the Belmont Derby and Pegasus World Cup Turf.

== Racing career ==
=== 2024: Two-year-old season ===
Test Score started his career with two different Maiden races and an entry into the With Anticipation Stakes before starting in the Thoroughbred Aftercare Alliance Stakes (Black Type) where it finished second; he has run four races into his two-year-old season winning only one race and earning $123,575.

=== 2025: Three-year-old season ===
During Test Score's three-year-old season and after three months off the horse won the Transylvania Stakes, Belmont Derby, and Twilight Derby. Test Score also got the highest grade in Hollywood Derby Field. Test Score also was a length behind first during Saratoga Derby Invitational on August 2 and got second by a nose in the American Turf on May 3.

=== 2026: Four-year-old season ===
To start out his four-year-old season Test Score won the G1 Pegasus World Cup Turf Invitational hosted at Gulfstream Park on 24 January.

On 2 May, Test Score entered the G1 Turf Classic Stakes at Churchill Downs finished 8th behind winner Rhetorical.

== Racing Statistic ==
Date	Distance	Race	Grade	Track	Surface	Field	Odds	Finish	Winning Time (Note: Official time of winning horse. The time written in Italics doesn't belong to Test Score.)	Winning (Losing) Horse	Jockey	Ref
2024 two-year-old season
Jul 19	1,100 m	Maiden Special Weight		Saratoga	Dirt	6	14/1	2nd	1:02.41	Governor Sam	Manuel Franco	
Aug 29	1,700 m	With Anticipation Stakes	GIII	Saratoga	Dirt	6	13/2	5th	1:41.79	Zulu Kingdom	Junior Alvarado	
Oct 4	1,600 m	Maiden Special Weight		Keeneland	Turf	12	13/8	1st	1:37.47	(West Beach)	Manuel Franco	
Nov 1	1,600 m	Thoroughbred Aftercare Alliance Stakes	BT	Del Mar	Turf	14	10/1	2nd	1:37.44	Chasing Liberty	Manuel Franco	
2025 three-year-old season
Feb 1	1,700 m	Kitten's Joy Stakes	Listed	Gulfstream	Turf	7	6/4	3rd	1:40.48	Charlie's To Blame	Tyler Gaffalione	
Apr 7	1,700 m	Transylvania Stakes	GIII	Keeneland	Turf	12	8/1	1st	1:43.48	(Scipio)	Manuel Franco	
May 3	1,700 m	American Turf Stakes	GI	Churchill Downs	Turf	14	6/1	2nd	1:41.64	Zulu Kingdom	Manuel Franco	
Jul 4	1,800 m	Belmont Derby	GI	Saratoga	Turf	7	3/1	1st	1:45.56	(World Beater)	Manuel Franco	
Aug 2	2,000 m	Saratoga Derby	GI	Saratoga	Turf	9	3/1	3rd	1:52.82	World Beater	Manuel Franco	
Aug 30	2,000 m	Nashville Derby	GIII	Kentucky Downs	Turf	12	3/1	4th	2:06.07	Wimbledon Hawkeye	Manuel Franco	
Oct 25	1,800 m	Twilight Derby	GII	Santa Anita	Turf	5	4/6	1st	1:47.66	(Maaz)	Juan Hernandez	
Nov 29	1,800 m	Hollywood Derby	GI	Del Mar	Turf	8	4/6	3rd	1:50.74	Salamis	Juan Hernandez	
2026 four-year-old season
Jan 24	1,800 m	Pegasus World Cup Turf	GI	Gulfstream	Turf	12	8/1	1st	1:47.04	(One Stripe)	Manuel Franco	
May 2	1,800 m	Turf Classic Stakes	GI	Churchill Downs	Turf	9	4/1	8th	1:45.96	Rhetorical	Manuel Franco	
Jun 6	1,900 m	Manhattan Stakes	GI	Saratoga	Turf	9	12/1	2nd	1:50.50	Deterministic	Manuel Franco	
Aug 1	2000 m	Arlington Million	GI	Colonial Downs	Turf	7	3.50	5th	2:00.80	Burnham Square	Manuel France	

== Pedigree ==
Pedigree of Test Score
Sire Lookin At Lucky 2007 b.	Smart Strike; 1992 b,	Mr. Prospector	Raise a Native
Sire Lookin At Lucky 2007 b.	Smart Strike; 1992 b,	Mr. Prospector	Gold Digger
Sire Lookin At Lucky 2007 b.	Smart Strike; 1992 b,	Classy 'n Smart	Smarten
Sire Lookin At Lucky 2007 b.	Smart Strike; 1992 b,	Classy 'n Smart	No Class
Sire Lookin At Lucky 2007 b.	Private Feeling; 1999 b.	Belong to Me	Danzig
Sire Lookin At Lucky 2007 b.	Private Feeling; 1999 b.	Belong to Me	Belonging
Sire Lookin At Lucky 2007 b.	Private Feeling; 1999 b.	Regal Feeling	Clever Trick
Sire Lookin At Lucky 2007 b.	Private Feeling; 1999 b.	Regal Feeling	Sharp Belle
Dam Joy of Learning 2016 b.	Kitten's Joy; 2001 ch.	El Prado	Sadler's Wells
Dam Joy of Learning 2016 b.	Kitten's Joy; 2001 ch.	El Prado	Lady Capulet
Dam Joy of Learning 2016 b.	Kitten's Joy; 2001 ch.	Kitten's First	Lear Fan
Dam Joy of Learning 2016 b.	Kitten's Joy; 2001 ch.	Kitten's First	That's My Hon
Dam Joy of Learning 2016 b.	Miss Chapin; 2001 b.	Royal Academy	Nijinsky
Dam Joy of Learning 2016 b.	Miss Chapin; 2001 b.	Royal Academy	Crimson Saint
Dam Joy of Learning 2016 b.	Miss Chapin; 2001 b.	Society Dream	Akarad
Dam Joy of Learning 2016 b.	Miss Chapin; 2001 b.	Society Dream	Society Bride
