= Old Dominion Derby =

- Class: Grade III
- Location: Colonial Downs; New Kent County, Virginia
- Inaugurated: 1998 (as Virginia Derby)
- Race type: Thoroughbred - Flat racing
- Website: Colonial Downs

Race information
- Distance: 1 1/8 miles (9 furlongs)
- Surface: Turf
- Track: Left-handed
- Qualification: Three-year-olds
- Weight: 123 lbs with allowances
- Purse: $500,000 (2023)

The Old Dominion Derby is a Grade III American Thoroughbred horse race for three-year-olds over a distance of one and one-eighth miles on the turf held annually in September at Colonial Downs in New Kent County, Virginia. The event currently carries a purse of $500,000.

== History ==
The inaugural running of the event as the Virginia Derby took place on October 3, 1998 as part of the newly opened racetrack in Virginia known as Colonial Downs at a distance of 1 1/4 miles on the outer turf course.

The quality of the event consistently improved and in 2004 the American Graded Stakes Committee upgraded the classification to Grade III status. That year the winner was Kenneth and Sarah Ramsey's Kitten's Joy who later in the year captured the crown of U.S. Champion Male Turf Horse. The 2005 winner English Channel later in his career won the Breeders' Cup Turf and in 2007 was also crowned U.S. Champion Male Turf Horse.

In 2006 the event was upgraded to Grade II which attracted the finest three-year-old turf horses with a massive US$1 million purse.

However the track ran into a dispute between track management and horsemen's organizations and the track closed after the 2013 meeting.

The event was not held in 2014.

In 2015 the event was moved to Laurel Park in Laurel, Maryland and was renamed to the Commonwealth Derby and the distance was decreased to 1 1/8 miles.

The event was down graded to Grade III in 2017.

In 2018 the event was not held, but Virginia laws were amended with regard to funding horse racing and the Colonial Downs reopened in 2019 and the event was scheduled as the New Kent County Virginia Derby.

In 2020 due to the COVID-19 pandemic in the United States, the track canceled the meeting prior to the running of the event.

In 2025, Colonial Downs created a new event named the Virginia Derby that was run on the dirt track and scheduled in the spring as a Road to the Kentucky Derby prep race. Colonial Downs retained the turf event and renamed it to the Old Dominion Derby.

== Records ==
Speed:

- 1 1/4 miles: 1:59.62 - Red Giant (2007)
- 1 1/8 miles: 1:45.81 - Just Howard (2017)

Margins:

- 3 1/4 lengths – English Channel (2005)

Most wins by an owner:

- 3 - Peter Vegso (2002, 2003, 2006)

Most wins by a jockey:

- 3 - Edgar S. Prado (2002, 2003, 2004)

Most wins by a Trainer:

- 3 - Todd Pletcher (2005, 2007, 2022)
- 3 - William I. Mott (2002, 2003, 2006)
- 3 - Dale L. Romans (2004, 2010, 2012)
- 3 - H. Graham Motion (2017, 2019, 2021)

== Winners ==
Year	Winner	Jockey	Trainer	Owner	Distance	Time	Purse	Grade	Ref
At Colonial Downs – Old Dominion Derby
2026	Lennox the Grey	Mychel J. Sanchez	Arnaud Delacour	Willow Pond Stable	1 1/8 miles	1:49.77	$506,000	III	
2025	World Beater	Jaime Torres	Riley Mott	Pin Oak Stud	1 1/8 miles	1:53.01	$503,500	III	
New Kent County Virginia Derby
2024	Deterministic	Manuel Franco	Christophe Clement	St. Elias Stable, Ken Langone, Steven C. Duncker & Vicarage Stable	1 1/8 miles	1:47.76	$504,000	III	
2023	Integration	Kendrick Carmouche	Claude R. McGaughey III	West Point Thoroughbreds & Woodford Racing	1 1/8 miles	1:46.41	$504,000	III	
2022	Capensis	Irad Ortiz Jr.	Todd A. Pletcher	Eclipse Thoroughbred Partners, Robert V. LaPenta, Gainesway Stable, Winchell Thoroughbreds & Stonestreet Stables	1 1/8 miles	1:48.15	$305,000	III	
2021	Wootton Asset (FR)	Jose L. Ortiz	H. Graham Motion	Madaket Stables	1 1/8 miles	1:46.79	$250,000	III	
2020	Race not held								
2019	English Bee	Jorge A. Vargas Jr.	H. Graham Motion	Calumet Farm	1 1/8 miles	1:52.94	$250,000	III	
2018	Race not held								
At Laurel Park – Commonwealth Derby
2017	Just Howard	Feargal Lynch	H. Graham Motion	Skeedattle Associates	1 1/8 miles	1:45.81	$200,000	III	
2016	Deeply Undervalued	Manuel Franco	Chad C. Brown	Klaravich Stables & William Lawrence	1 1/8 miles	1:46.63	$200,000	II	
2015	One Go All Go	Ronald Hisby	Pavel Matejka	Preston Stables & Prestonwood Racing	1 1/8 miles	1:48.10	$400,000	II	
2014	Race not held								
At Colonial Downs – Virginia Derby
2013	War Dancer	Alan Garcia	Kenneth G. McPeek	Magdalena Racing	1 1/4 miles	2:03.57	$500,000	II	
2012	Silver Max	Robby Albarado	Dale L. Romans	Mark Bacon & Dana Wells	1 1/4 miles	2:04.05	$594,000	II	
2011	Air Support	Alex O. Solis	Claude R. McGaughey III	Stuart S. Janney III	1 1/4 miles	2:00.80	$600,000	II	
2010	Paddy O'Prado	Kent J. Desormeaux	Dale L. Romans	Donegal Racing	1 1/4 miles	2:02.58	$600,000	II	
2009	Battle of Hastings (GB)	Tyler Baze	Jeff Mullins	Michael House	1 1/4 miles	2:03.29	$750,000	II	
2008	Gio Ponti	Garrett K. Gomez	Christophe Clement	Castleton Lyons	1 1/4 miles	2:02.22	$772,500	II	
2007	Red Giant	Horacio Karamanos	Todd A. Pletcher	Peachtree Stable	1 1/4 miles	1:59.62	$1,000,000	II	
2006	Go Between	Garrett K. Gomez	William I. Mott	Peter Vegso	1 1/4 miles	1:59.74	$1,000,000	II	
2005	English Channel	John R. Velazquez	Todd A. Pletcher	James T. Scatuorchio	1 1/4 miles	2:02.57	$750,000	III	
2004	Kitten's Joy	Edgar S. Prado	Dale L. Romans	Kenneth and Sarah Ramsey	1 1/4 miles	2:01.22	$500,000	III	
2003	Silver Tree	Edgar S. Prado	William I. Mott	Peter Vegso	1 1/4 miles	2:01.11	$500,000	Listed	
2002	Orchard Park	Edgar S. Prado	William I. Mott	Peter Vegso	1 1/4 miles	2:03.10	$500,000	Listed	
2001	Potaro (IRE)	Brent E. Bartram	Jonathan E. Sheppard	Augustin Stable	1 1/4 miles	2:02.18	$200,000	Listed	
2000	Lightning Paces	Greg W. Hutton	John J. Robb	Tulip Hill Farm	1 1/4 miles	2:02.18	$200,000	Listed	
1999	Phi Beta Doc	Ramon A. Dominguez	Robert W. Leonard	Dennis Foster & Robert W. Leonard	1 1/4 miles	1:59.97	$200,000	Listed	
1998	Crowd Pleaser	Jean-Luc Samyn	Jonathan E. Sheppard	Augustin Stable	1 1/4 miles	2:00.28	$250,000	Listed	

== See also ==
- List of American and Canadian Graded races
