= Showing Up (horse) =

American-bred Thoroughbred racehorse

- Sire: Strategic Mission
- Grandsire: Mr. Prospector
- Dam: Miss Alethia
- Damsire: T.V. Commercial
- Sex: Stallion
- Foaled: 2003
- Country: United States
- Colour: Chestnut
- Breeder: Nellie M. Cox
- Owner: Lael Stables
- Trainer: Barclay Tagg
- Record: 10:7-1-1
- Earnings: $1,660,500

Major wins
- Coolmore Lexington Stakes (2006); Colonial Turf Cup (2006); Secretariat Stakes (2006); Jamaica Breeders' Cup Handicap (2006); Hollywood Derby (2006)

Showing Up (foaled February 6, 2003, in Kentucky) is an American thoroughbred race horse. Foaled near Wilmore, Kentucky, in 2003 at Peter Taafe's Taafe Farm, he was bred by Nellie M. Cox of Rose Retreat Farm. Showing Up spent the first year of his life on Cox's Goochland, Virginia, farm. The chestnut colt was sold as a yearling for $85,000 at the Keeneland September sale in 2004 and was later acquired as a two-year-old in training by trainer Barclay Tagg for the owners of the 2006 Kentucky Derby winner, Barbaro, for $60,000 at the Fasig-Tipton Midatlantic sale in May 2005.

== Background ==
Showing Up is owned by Gretchen and Roy Jackson's Lael Stables in West Grove, Pennsylvania. He was trained by Barclay Tagg (who also trained the dual classic winner Funny Cide) and was ridden by Cornelio Velásquez. Since he was bred for the turf on both sides, Tagg believed the colt would come alive on the grass.

"He's small", said Tagg. "He's not that good-looking; he's not a robust horse by any means. He just goes out there and gets it done."

His sire is Strategic Mission, a son of Mr. Prospector. Racing as a homebred for Charlotte Weber's Live Oak Stud, Strategic Mission won or placed in all five of his graded stakes starts on turf, including a victory in the 2001 Grade III Fort Marcy Handicap. Miss Alethia, Showing Up's dam, was the daughter of T.V. Commercial, himself the son of successful turf racer T.V. Lark. In 1961, T.V. Lark won the Washington, D.C. International, a prominent turf race. Showing Up is a half-brother to six-time stakes winner and Grade 3-placed Gimmeawink (Elusive Quality), also bred by Rose Retreat Farm.

== Racing career ==
Unraced as a two-year-old, Showing Up started his career with three consecutive wins.

In winning a mile allowance at Gulfstream Park, he set a new track record of 1:34, slicing a second off the old record. His win in the Grade II Coolmore Lexington Stakes at Keeneland punched his ticket for the 2006 Kentucky Derby. Tagg said of the Derby, "They're only a 3-year-old once. I decided to make the switch to the grass because I thought Barbaro would win the Triple Crown. I can't imagine he'd have beaten Barbaro who went into the Preakness undefeated in six races. I thought Showing Up might have a chance to be the national champion turf horse." He added, "He did beat 14 horses in that race. He's no slouch."

In his first race on turf, the $1 million Colonial Turf Cup Stakes at Colonial Downs in Providence Forge, Virginia, Showing Up came from behind to win by 3 1/4 lengths over Kip Deville (who at one point was twenty lengths in front). Showing Up's time of 1:52.98 bested the previous mark, set eight years earlier, by almost two seconds. The win was number 2,000 for jockey Cornelio Velásquez.

The Colonial Turf Cup was the first is a series of four races called the Grand Slam of Grass, whose possible winner would earn a $5 million bonus. The second, third, and fourth legs are the Virginia Derby, the Secretariat at Arlington Park, and the Breeders' Cup Turf at Churchill Downs. The $1 million Grade II Virginia Derby is run three weeks after the Colonial. Tagg said: "In mid-summer to ask horses to run their 'A' races back-to-back in three weeks is very hard to do. I wish it was at least four weeks. He's a skinny little horse, but if he's doing well, we'll certainly come."

Eventually, Tagg decided against the complete Grand Slam for Showing Up. Instead, he ran him in the $400,000 Grade I Secretariat Stakes which the colt won, achieving the second-fastest Secretariat on record and a Beyer Speed figure of 107. His win also put him over the $1 million mark in earnings in six starts. Go Between, the winner of the Virginia Derby (the race Showing Up skipped), faded on the far turn, finishing last.

Showing Up came in third in the September Man O' War Stakes at Belmont Park. The youngest horse in thefield, he lost to the Irish-bred Cacique, third by a nose to Go Deputy.

Tagg skipped the Breeders' Cup Turf on Nov. 4 at Churchill Downs and entered Showing Up in the Grade II $300,000 Jamaica Handicap at Belmont. After Showing Up won (earning a 110 BRIS Late Pace rating), Tagg pointed him towards the Grade 1 Hollywood Derby on Nov. 26, restricted to 3-year-olds.

"The Breeders' Cup races are too tough this year, either of them", Tagg said. "He's only a 3-year-old. There are a couple of good 3-year-old races left. Hopefully, he can win them. Finishing third in a Breeders' Cup, either one, isn't going to do me a bit of good with the horse; it's not going to make him a champion, it's not going to make me rich enough to retire."

As the odds-on favorite in the Hollywood Derby, Showing Up won his second Grade I race by 2 1/4 lengths in the time of 1:59 1/5, which is the fastest Derby yet at its current distance.

His earnings to date amount to $1,660,500.

Finish	Race	Distance	Track	Condition
2nd	Maker's Mark Mile Stakes GII	One Mile	Keeneland Race Course	wet
1st	Hollywood Derby GI	One and One-Quarter Miles	Hollywood Park	firm
1st	Jamaica Breeders' Cup Handicap GII	One and One/Eighth Miles	Belmont Park	firm
3rd	Man O' War Stakes GI	One and Three-Quarter Miles	Belmont Park	firm
1st	Secretariat Stakes GI	One and One-Quarter Miles	Arlington Park	firm
1st	Colonial Turf Cup	One and Three-Sixteenth Miles	Colonial Downs	firm
6th	Kentucky Derby GI	One and One-Quarter Miles	Churchill Downs	Fast
1st	Coolmore Lexington Stakes GII	One and One-Sixteenth Miles	Keeneland	Fast
1st	Allowance	One Mile	Gulfstream Park	Fast
1st	Maiden	Six and One-Half Furlongs	Gulfstream Park	Fast

== Retirement ==
On April 16, 2008, Tagg announced that Showing Up would retire sound. In 2009, he will stand at Frank Stronach's Adena Springs South near Williston, Florida, for a fee of $7,500 as the property of Adena Springs and Lael.
