= Secretariat Stakes =

- Class: Grade II
- Location: Colonial Downs; New Kent County, Virginia
- Inaugurated: 1974 at Arlington Park
- Race type: Thoroughbred – Flat racing
- Website: Colonial Downs

Race information
- Distance: One mile
- Surface: Turf
- Track: Left-handed
- Qualification: Three-year-olds
- Weight: 123 lbs. with allowances
- Purse: $500,000 (2023)

The Secretariat Stakes is a Grade II American Thoroughbred horse race for three-year-olds over a distance of one mile on the turf. The event was originally raced at Arlington Park in Arlington Heights, Illinois as a supporting stakes race on the Arlington Million racing program.

Churchill Downs, whose parent company owns the land of the defunct Arlington Park racetrack, originally planned to run the Secretariat Stakes in 2022, but the race was not run due to issues with the Churchill Downs turf course. The 2023 race was rescheduled to be run at Churchill-owned Colonial Downs in Virginia.

== History ==
=== Precursor — Arlington Invitational ===
In 1973, after Secretariat became the first U.S. Triple Crown winner in twenty five years, many race tracks wanted to have him race at their tracks. Arlington racetrack management offered to run him in the American Derby but it was too soon after his Belmont Stakes victory. Instead, management established an event that would enhance Secretariat's connections. This event was called the Arlington Invitational with $125,000 stakes offered in order to showcase Secretariat to Chicago racing fans and it was held 30 June 1973. A crowd of 41,223 witnessed seeing the three challengers grouped as a single betting entry at 6–1 and Secretariat was 1–20 odds-on which created a minus pool of $17,941. Secretariat won the 1 1/8 miles race by nine lengths in 1:47 flat, just 1/5 off the track record set by Damascus with My Gallant and Our Native running second and third respectively. Both of these horses had lost to the champion in the Triple Crown series. The performance produced a lasting impression on Arlington Park management.

=== Event ===
One year and one day after Secretariat's performance at Arlington Park, track management scheduled a race to honor him. The inaugural event was held 30 June 1974 over a distance of 1 1/16 miles on the turf. The race was won in an upset with the 39-1 longshot Glossary winning. The event was set with Grade II status.

It was run over 1 1/8 miles (1.8 km) in 1975/76 and extended to 1 1/2 miles (2.4 km) from 1978 to 1984, before settling at 1 1/4 miles from 1985 to 2018.

In 1984 the event was upgraded to Grade I status.

In 1985 the event was held at Hawthorne Race Course over a shorter distance of 1 1/4 miles.

There was no race run in 1988, 1998 and 1999.

In 2005 it was included in the Grand Slam of Grass, which offered a substantial bonus to the winner of this race, the Colonial Turf Cup, the Virginia Derby and the Breeders' Cup Turf.

In 2019 the race was shortened to one mile.

In 2020 due to the COVID-19 pandemic in the United States, Arlington Park did not schedule the event in its abbreviated season.

During the last year of racing at Arlington Park in 2021, the race was renamed the Bruce D. Stakes in honor of the late Bruce Duchossois, the son of track owner Richard L. Duchossois.

In March 2022 Churchill Downs Incorporated (owner of the Arlington Park property) announced that it would move the Secretariat Stakes to Churchill Downs along with several of Arlington's traditional stakes races, including the Arlington Million. A week and a half before the Secretariat was supposed to be run, Churchill announced that the Secretariat would not be contested due to issues with the Churchill Downs turf course, while the other major turf stakes formerly run at Arlington—the Arlington Million and the Beverly D. Stakes—would be run as scheduled.

In December 2022 an agreement was reached between Churchill Downs and the American Graded Stakes Committee to move the 2023 Arlington Million and its supporting races, including the Secretariat Stakes, to Colonial Downs in Virginia.

== Records ==
Race record:

- 1 mile: 1:35.10 – Gigante (2023)
- 1 1/4 miles: 1:59.65 – Kitten's Joy (2004)
- 1 1/2 miles: 2:29.80 – Mac Diarmida (1978)

Margins:

- 7 1/2 lengths – Stately Don (1987)

Most wins by an owner:

- 5 – Michael Tabor (1996, 2000, 2011, 2014, 2015)

Most wins by a jockey:

- 3 – Pat Day (1983, 1991, 1995)
- 3 – Kent Desormeaux (2002, 2009, 2010)
- 3 – Javier Castellano (2003, 2019, 2023)

Most wins by a trainer:

- 4 – Aidan O'Brien (2000, 2011, 2014, 2015)

== Winners ==
Year	Winner	Jockey	Trainer	Owner	Distance	Time	Purse	Grade	Ref
At Colonial Downs – Secretariat Stakes
2026	Supercharger	Manuel Franco	Cherie DeVaux	C R K Stable	1 1/16 miles	1:41.24	$500,000	II	
2025	Giocoso	Ben Curtis	J. Keith Desormeaux	Rocker O Ranch	1 mile	1:35.36	$500,000	II	
2024	Trikari	John R. Velazquez	H. Graham Motion	Amerman Racing	1 mile	1:34.92	$500,000	II	
2023	Gigante	Javier Castellano	Steve Asmussen	Iapetus Racing & Diamond T Racing	1 mile	1:35.10	$500,000	II	
2022	Race not held								
At Arlington Park – Bruce D. Stakes
2021	Point Me By	Luis Saez	Eddie Kenneally	Homewrecker Racing	1 mile	1.37.70	$300,000	I	
Secretariat Stakes
2020	Race not held								
2019	Valid Point	Javier Castellano	Chad C. Brown	e Five Racing Thoroughbreds & Michael J. Ryan	1 mile	1:35.50	$500,000	I	
2018	Carrick	John R. Velazquez	Thomas Morley	Donegal Racing	1 1/4 miles	2:01.04	$400,000	I	
2017	Oscar Performance	Jose L. Ortiz	Brian A. Lynch	Amerman Racing (Jerry & Joan Amerman)	1 1/4 miles	2:01.79	$400,000	I	
2016	Beach Patrol	Florent Geroux	Chad C. Brown	James Covello, Sheep Pond & Head of Plains Partners	1 1/4 miles	2:01.95	$450,000	I	
2015	Highland Reel (IRE)	Seamie Heffernan	Aidan P. O'Brien	Derrick Smith, Mrs. John Magnier & Michael Tabor	1 1/4 miles	2:02.26	$450,000	I	
2014	Adelaide (IRE)	Ryan L. Moore	Aidan P. O'Brien	Derrick Smith, Mrs. John Magnier, Michael Tabor, B. Webb, J. Murray & J. Ingham	1 1/4 miles	2:02.13	$500,000	I	
2013	Admiral Kitten	Rosie Napravnik	Michael J. Maker	Kenneth and Sarah Ramsey	1 1/4 miles	2:02.17	$500,000	I	
2012	Bayrir (FR)	Christophe Lemaire	Alain de Royer-Dupré	HH Aga Khan IV	1 1/4 miles	2:02.92	$500,000	I	
2011	Treasure Beach (GB)	Colm O'Donoghue	Aidan P. O'Brien	Derrick Smith, Mrs. John Magnier & Michael Tabor	1 1/4 miles	2:03.91	$400,000	I	
2010	Paddy O'Prado	Kent J. Desormeaux	Dale L. Romans	Donegal Racing	1 1/4 miles	2:04.71	$400,000	I	
2009	Take the Points	Kent J. Desormeaux	Todd A. Pletcher	Starlight Partners	1 1/4 miles	2:05.41	$400,000	I	
2008	Winchester	Rene R. Douglas	Dermot K. Weld	Bertram & Diana Firestone	1 1/4 miles	2:01.76	$400,000	I	
2007	Shamdinan (FR)	Julien R. Leparoux	Doug F. O'Neill	Triple B Farms	1 1/4 miles	2:04.02	$424,000	I	
2006	Showing Up	Cornelio Velasquez	Barclay Tagg	Lael Stables (H. Roy & Gretchen Jackson)	1 1/4 miles	2:00.09	$400,000	I	
2005	Gun Salute	Cornelio Velasquez	William I. Mott	Brant Laue	1 1/4 miles	2:03.79	$400,000	I	
2004	Kitten's Joy	Jerry D. Bailey	Dale L. Romans	Kenneth and Sarah Ramsey	1 1/4 miles	1:59.65	$400,000	I	
2003	Kicken Kris	Javier Castellano	Michael R. Matz	Brushwood Stable	1 1/4 miles	2:02.53	$400,000	I	
2002	Chiselling	Kent J. Desormeaux	Robert J. Frankel	Juddmonte Farms	1 1/4 miles	2:04.16	$400,000	I	
2001	Startac	Alex O. Solis	Simon Bray	Allen Paulson Living Trust	1 1/4 miles	2:04.91	$400,000	I	
2000	Ciro	Michael J. Kinane	Aidan P. O'Brien	Jayeff B Stables	1 1/4 miles	2:01.64	$400,000	I	
1998–1999		Race not held							
1997	Honor Glide	Garrett K. Gomez	James E. Day	Robert G. Schaedle III	1 1/4 miles	2:02.74	$400,000	I	
1996	Marlin	Shane Sellers	D. Wayne Lukas	Michael Tabor	1 1/4 miles	2:01.09	$500,000	I	
1995	Hawk Attack	Pat Day	W. Elliott Walden	Cavalier Stable	1 1/4 miles	2:00.17	$400,000	I	
1994	Vaudeville	Gary L. Stevens	Fordell Fierce	Ron Crockett	1 1/4 miles	2:01.11	$400,000	I	
1993	Awad	Jorge Velasquez	David G. Donk	Ryehill Farm Stable (Jim & Eleanor Ryan)	1 1/4 miles	2:08.74	$400,000	I	
1992	Ghazi	Robbie Davis	Del W. Carroll II	Hassan Shoaib	1 1/4 miles	2:01.18	$300,000	I	
1991	Jackie Wackie	Pat Day	Dominic F. Imprescia Jr.	Carol Rocca & Gus DeMarinis	1 1/4 miles	2:01.27	$300,000	I	
1990	§ Super Abound	Randy Romero	Carl A. Nafzger	Genter Stable	1 1/4 miles	2:01.60	$250,000	I	
1989	Hawkster	Pat Valenzuela	Ron McAnally	Mr. & Mrs. J. Shelton Meredith	1 1/4 miles	2:04.00	$250,000	I	
1988	Race not held								
1987	Stately Don	Jacinto Vasquez	LeRoy Jolley	Bradley M. Shannon	1 1/4 miles	2:04.60	$172,650	I	
1986	Southjet	Jose A. Santos	Angel Penna Sr.	Dogwood Stable	1 1/4 miles	2:02.00	$170,850	I	
At Hawthorne Race Course
1985	Derby Wish	Randy Romero	William I. Mott	John A. Franks	1 1/4 miles	2:01.00	$269,800	I	
At Arlington Park
1984	Vision	Gregg McCarron	Woodford C. Stephens	Cherry Valley Farm	1 1/2 miles	2:38.40	$195,400	I	
1983	Fortnightly	Pat Day	Anthony Basile	Bwamazon Farm	1 1/2 miles	2:32.40	$170,600	II	
1982	Half Iced	Donald MacBeth	Stanley M. Hough	Bertram R. Firestone	1 1/2 miles	2:31.00	$150,000	II	
1981	Sing Sing	Michael Venezia	Victor J. Nickerson	Sugartown Stable (Fred Papert)	1 1/2 miles	2:53.20	$160,400	II	
1980	Spruce Needles	Julio C. Espinoza	William E. Adams	Golden Chance Farm (Robert & Verna Lehmann)	1 1/2 miles	2:40.80	$166,600	II	
1979	Golden Act	Sandy Hawley	Loren Rettele	William H. Oldknow & Robert W. Phipps	1 1/2 miles	2:32.80	$151,800	II	
1978	Mac Diarmida	Jean Cruguet	Flint S. Schulhofer	Jerome M. Torsney	1 1/2 miles	2:29.80	$166,000	II	
1977	Text	Marco Castaneda	Vincent Clyne	Elmendorf Farm	1 1/16 miles	1:42.00	$121,900	II	Off turf
1976	Joachim	Sam Maple	Jack Van Berg	Pratt-Van Berg	1 1/8 miles	1:50.80	$128,400	II	
1975	Intrepid Hero	Ángel Cordero Jr.	John W. Russell	Ogden Mills Phipps	1 1/8 miles	1:49.80	$134,000	II	
1974	Glossary	Angel L. Santiago	Victor J. Nickerson	Elmendorf Farm	1 1/16 miles	1:42.80	$136,400	II	
Arlington Invitational
1973	Secretariat	Ron Turcotte	Lucien Laurin	Meadow Stable	1 1/8 miles	1:47.00	$125,000		

Legend:
Dirt Turf
Notes:
§ Ran as an entry with stablemate Unbridled

== See also ==
List of American and Canadian Graded races
