= Gio Ponti (horse) =

American-bred Thoroughbred racehorse

- Sire: Tale of the Cat
- Grandsire: Storm Cat
- Dam: Chipeta Springs
- Damsire: Alydar
- Sex: Stallion
- Foaled: 2005
- Country: United States
- Colour: Bay
- Breeder: Kilboy Estate
- Owner: Castleton Lyons
- Trainer: Christophe Clement
- Record: 29: 12-10-1
- Earnings: $6,169,800

Major wins
- Bourbon Stakes (2007); Hill Prince Stakes (2008); Sir Beaufort Stakes (2008); Virginia Derby (2008); Manhattan Handicap (2009); Frank E. Kilroe Mile Handicap (2009); Man o' War Stakes (2009, 2010); Arlington Million (2009); Shadwell Turf Mile Stakes (2010, 2011); Breeders' Cup placings: 2nd: Breeders' Cup Classic (2009) & Breeders' Cup Mile (2010)

Awards
- American Champion Male Turf Horse (2009, 2010); American Champion Older Male Horse (2009)
- Last updated on March 25, 2010

Gio Ponti (foaled February 28, 2005 in Kentucky) is an American Thoroughbred race horse who was the Champion Turf Horse in 2009 and 2010, and finished second to Zenyatta in the 2009 Breeder's Cup Classic. He was sired by Tale of the Cat, a son of Storm Cat, out of the stakes-placed Alydar mare Chipeta Springs, making him half-brother to stakes-winner Fisher Pond.

During his racing career, Gio Ponti was owned by Castleton Lyons and trained by Christophe Clement.

== Racing career ==
Named for a well-known Italian artist and architect, Gio Ponti began racing in the silks of Shane Ryan's Castleton Lyons Farm under trainer Christophe Clement and broke his maiden in his first start as a two-year-old at Belmont Park, winning by 2½ lengths. He was then entered in the Bourbon Stakes at Keeneland in his second start, where he scored the first stakes win of his career. After an unplaced effort in the Breeders' Cup Juvenile Turf, he was given time off to prepare for his 3-year-old campaign.

At 3, Gio Ponti gained graded stakes success in the G3 Hill Prince Stakes at Belmont, the G2 Virginia Derby at Colonial Downs, and the G3 Sir Beaufort Stakes at Santa Anita. He was also runner up in the G2 Del Mar Derby at Del Mar and the G2 Jamaica Handicap at Belmont. By the end of his three-year-old year, he had $820,800 in career earnings over turf and synthetic surfaces.

At age 4, the bay colt won four consecutive Grade One races: the Frank E. Kilroe Mile Handicap, Manhattan Handicap, Man o' War Stakes, and Arlington Million, making him one of the favorites for the Breeders' Cup Turf. After an upset in the Turf Classic Invitational, his owners decided to point him towards the Breeders' Cup Classic instead, which was run at a more favorable distance of 1¼ miles, as opposed to the Turf's 1½ mile distance. However, Gio Ponti lost to the then-undefeated mare Zenyatta.

Shortly after the Breeders' Cup Classic, Gio Ponti's connections announced he would remain in training for 2010 and be pointed toward the Dubai World Cup. He started the year with a second in the Tampa Bay stakes. In the Dubai World Cup, he was boxed in and then went to the far outside, finishing fourth.

In 2010, Gio Ponti first raced at Belmont Park, where he was second in the Manhattan Handicap, and first in the Man O' War Stakes. He then ran in the Arlington Million but lost to Debussy. At Keeneland Race Course in Lexington, Kentucky, under jockey Ramon Dominguez he won the Shadwell Turf Mile Stakes, earning a spot in the Breeders' Cup with a "Win and You're In" berth. In the 2010 Breeders' Cup Mile, Gio Ponti ran second to the future U.S. Racing Hall of Fame mare Goldikova. As Clement once put it, "He is very well educated - ladies first." His efforts earned him the title of Eclipse Male Turf champion for the second straight year.

In 2011, Gio Ponti won the Grade 1 Shadwell Mile, finished second in the Arlington Million and Man O' War, and ran fourth in his fourth Breeders’ Cup start, this time in the Mile. He earned $6.1 million in 28 starts, making him one of the richest Thoroughbreds in America of all time.

== Pedigree ==
Pedigree of GIO PONTI
| Sire Tale of the Cat | Storm Cat | Storm Bird | Northern Dancer |
| Sire Tale of the Cat | Storm Cat | Storm Bird | South Ocean |
| Sire Tale of the Cat | Storm Cat | Terlingua | Secretariat |
| Sire Tale of the Cat | Storm Cat | Terlingua | Crimson Saint |
| Sire Tale of the Cat | Yarn | Mr. Prospector | Raise A Native |
| Sire Tale of the Cat | Yarn | Mr. Prospector | Gold Digger |
| Sire Tale of the Cat | Yarn | Narrate | Honest Pleasure |
| Sire Tale of the Cat | Yarn | Narrate | State |
| Dam Chipeta Springs | Alydar | Raise A Native | Native Dancer |
| Dam Chipeta Springs | Alydar | Raise A Native | Raise You |
| Dam Chipeta Springs | Alydar | Sweet Tooth | On-and-On |
| Dam Chipeta Springs | Alydar | Sweet Tooth | Plum Cake |
| Dam Chipeta Springs | Salt Spring (ARG) | Salt Marsh | Tom Rolfe |
| Dam Chipeta Springs | Salt Spring (ARG) | Salt Marsh | Saline |
| Dam Chipeta Springs | Salt Spring (ARG) | Jungle Mythologic (ARG) | Mount Athos (GB) |
| Dam Chipeta Springs | Salt Spring (ARG) | Jungle Mythologic (ARG) | Jungle Queen (ARG) |

== Race record ==
| Finish | Race | Date | Distance | Jockey | Time | Margin | Grade | Track | Notes |
|---|---|---|---|---|---|---|---|---|---|
| 4th | Breeders' Cup Mile | 11/05/2011 | 1 mi | Ramon A. Dominguez | 1:37.05 | 2 | I | Churchill Downs | |
| 1st | Shadwell Turf Mile Stakes | 10/08/2011 | 1 mi | Ramon A. Dominguez | 1:34.17 | 1 | I | Keeneland | |
| 2nd | Arlington Million | 08/13/2011 | 1 1/4 mi | Ramon A. Dominguez | 2:07.01 | 2 1/2 | I | Arlington Park | |
| 2nd | Man o' War Stakes | 06/09/2011 | 1 3/8 mi | Ramon A. Dominguez | 2:14.06 | 2 1/4 | I | Belmont Park | |
| 3rd | Manhattan Handicap | 05/11/2011 | 1 1/4 mi | Ramon A. Dominguez | 2:06.32 | | I | Belmont Park | |
| 5th | Dubai World Cup | 03/26/2011 | 1 1/4 mi | Ramon A. Dominguez | 2:05.94 | | I | Meydan | |
| 2nd | Breeders' Cup Mile | 11/06/2010 | 1 mi | Ramon A. Dominguez | 1:35.16 | 1 3/4 | I | Churchill Downs | |
| 1st | Shadwell Turf Mile Stakes | 10/09/2010 | 1 mi | Ramon A. Dominguez | 1:35.06 | 1 | I | Keeneland | |
| 2nd | Arlington Million | 08/21/2010 | 1 1/4 mi | Ramon A. Dominguez | 2:03.01 | 1/2 | I | Arlington Park | |
| 1st | Man o' War Stakes | 07/10/2010 | 1 3/8 mi | Ramon A. Dominguez | 2:16.20 | Neck | I | Belmont Park | |
| 2nd | Manhattan Handicap | 06/05/2010 | 1 1/4 mi | Ramon A. Dominguez | 1:59.46 | 1/2 | I | Belmont Park | |
| 4th | Dubai World Cup | 03/27/2010 | 1 1/4 mi | Ramon A. Dominguez | 2:03.83 | 1 1/4 | I | Meydan Racecourse | |
| 2nd | Tampa Bay Stakes | 02/20/2010 | 1 1/16 mi | Ramon A. Dominguez | 1:42.16 | Nose | Listed | Tampa Bay Downs | |
| 2nd | Breeders' Cup Classic | 11/07/2009 | 1 1/4 mi | Ramon A. Dominguez | 2:00.62 | 1 | I | Santa Anita Park | |
| 2nd | Joe Hirsch Turf Classic Invitational | 10/03/2009 | 1 1/2 mi | Ramon A. Dominguez | 2:41.22 | 1 3/4 | I | Belmont Park | |
| 1st | Arlington Million | 08/08/2009 | 1 1/4 mi | Ramon A. Dominguez | 2:04.19 | 1 1/4 | I | Arlington Park | |
| 1st | Man o' War Stakes | 07/11/2009 | 1 3/8 mi | Ramon A. Dominguez | 2:12.56 | 1 3/4 | I | Belmont Park | |
| 1st | Manhattan Handicap | 06/06/2009 | 1 1/4 mi | Garrett K. Gomez | 2:02.91 | 1 1/2 | I | Belmont Park | |
| 1st | Frank E. Kilroe Mile Handicap | 03/07/2009 | 1 mi | Ramon A. Dominguez | 1:33.65 | Nose | I | Santa Anita Park | |
| 5th | Strub Stakes | 02/07/2009 | 1 1/8 mi | Garrett K. Gomez | 1:48.22 | 1 1/2 | II | Santa Anita Park | |
| 1st | Sir Beaufort Stakes | 12/26/2008 | 1 mi | Garrett K. Gomez | 1:34.92 | 1 1/2 | III | Santa Anita Park | |
| 7th | Hollywood Derby | 11/30/2008 | 1 1/4 mi | Garrett K. Gomez | 2:01.43 | 2 1/2 | I | Santa Anita Park | |
| 2nd | Jamaica Handicap | 10/04/2008 | 1 1/8 mi | A Garcia | 1:49.75 | 3/4 | II | Belmont Park | |
| 2nd | Del Mar Derby | 08/31/2008 | 1 1/8 mi | Garrett K. Gomez | 1:46.68 | 1/2 | II | Del Mar Racetrack | |
| 1st | Virginia Derby | 07/19/2008 | 1 1/4 mi | Garrett K. Gomez | 2:02.22 | Nose | II | Colonial Downs | |
| 1st | Hill Prince | 06/06/2008 | 1 mi | Garrett K. Gomez | 1:35.03 | 2 | III | Belmont Park | |
| 8th | Breeders' Cup Juvenile Turf | 10/26/2007 | 1 mi | Ramon A. Dominguez | 1:40.48 | 8 | Listed | Monmouth Park | |
| 1st | Bourbon Stakes | 10/07/2007 | 1 1/16 mi | Ramon A. Dominguez | 1:45.92 | 1 1/2 | Listed | Keeneland | |
| 1st | Maiden Special Weight | 09/07/2007 | 7 furlongs | Garrett K. Gomez | 1:22.01 | 2 1/2 | | Belmont Park | |
