= Maid of the Mist (disambiguation) =

Maid of the Mist is a boat tour of Niagara Falls.

Maid of the Mist can also refer to the following:

- Maid of the Mist Incline, a former funicular railway
- Maid of the Mist Stakes, a horse race
- Maid of the Mist (film), a 1915 American silent drama film
- Maid of the Mist, a statue at Boston Public Gardens
- Maid of the Mist, a 1985 album by BZN
- Maid of the Mist, a 1912 composition for solo cornet by Herbert L. Clarke
- Maid of the Mist, a 2017 song by NY indie/punk band Diet Cig

== See also ==
- Anne of Geierstein, or The Maiden of the Mist, an 1829 novel by Sir Walter Scott
