= Grand Slam of Grass =

The Grand Slam of Grass is a series of American Thoroughbred horse races made up of four turf events for three-year-old horses.

The series offers a $5 million bonus for any horse who wins all four races. Currently sponsored by Jacobs Investments, the series consists of:

1. Colonial Turf Cup - June at Colonial Downs, New Kent, Virginia
2. Virginia Derby - July at Colonial Downs, New Kent, Virginia
3. Secretariat Stakes - August at Arlington Park, Chicago, Illinois
4. Breeders' Cup Turf - Late October/early November at a different location annually

Paddy O'Prado has come the closest to winning the Grand Slam. In 2010, he won the Colonial Turf Cup, Virginia Derby, and Secretariat, but did not run in the Breeders' Cup Turf.
