= Belmont Turf Sprint Stakes =

- Class: Grade III
- Location: Belmont Park; Elmont, New York, United States
- Inaugurated: 2016
- Race type: Thoroughbred – Flat racing
- Website: NYRA

Race information
- Distance: 6 furlongs
- Surface: Turf
- Track: Left-handed
- Qualification: Three-year-olds and older
- Weight: Base weights with allowances: 4-year-olds and up: 126 lbs. 3-year-olds: 124 lbs.
- Purse: $200,000 (since 2021)

The Belmont Turf Sprint Stakes is a Grade III American Thoroughbred horse race for three-year-olds and older run over a distance of six furlongs on the turf track held annually in October at Belmont Park in Elmont, New York. The event offers a purse of $200,000.

== History ==
The event was inaugurated on 8 October 2016 as the seventh race under card event on Jockey Club Gold Cup Day and was won by Pure Sensation who defeated the Australian-bred Power Alert in a time of 1:07.10.

The event with its short history has attracted talented turf sprinters which have run in the event as a prep race for the Breeders' Cup Turf Sprint. The event was upgraded in relative short time to a Grade III event in 2020.

Prior to 2022 the event was held as an invitational event. In 2022 the event was moved to Aqueduct Racetrack due to infield tunnel and redevelopment work at Belmont Park.

== Records ==
Speed record:

- 6 furlongs: 1:06.97 – Disco Partner (2017)

Margins:

- 5 lengths – Dancing Buck (2022)

Most wins:

- 2 – Disco Partner (2017, 2018)

Most wins by an owner:

- 3 – Patricia A. Generazio (2016, 2017, 2018)

Most wins by a jockey:

- 3 – Irad Ortiz Jr. (2017, 2018, 2021)

Most wins by a trainer:

- 4 – Christophe Clement (2016, 2017, 2018, 2024)

== Winners ==
Year	Winner	Age	Jockey	Trainer	Owner	Distance	Time	Purse	Grade	Ref
At Belmont Park - Belmont Turf Sprint Stakes
2026	Egyptian Mau (SAF)	6	Antonio Fresu	Neil D. Drysdale	Team Valor International	6 furlongs	1:08.85	$200,000	III	
At Aqueduct
2025	Alogon	6	Dylan Davis	Edward Allard	Charles T. Matses	6 furlongs	1:07.63	$200,000	III	
2024	Senbei	5	Manuel Franco	Christophe Clement	Reeves Thoroughbred Racing & Darlene Bilinski	6 furlongs	1:07.74	$200,000	III	
2023	Today's Flavor	5	Javier Castellano	George Weaver	Reddam Racing	6 furlongs	1:09.74	$200,000	Listed	Off turf
2022	Dancing Buck	4	Manuel Franco	Michelle Nevin	J and N Stables & Diamond Stable	6 furlongs	1:09.60	$200,000	III	
At Belmont Park – Belmont Turf Sprint Invitational Stakes
2021	Arrest Me Red	3	Irad Ortiz Jr.	Wesley A. Ward	Lael Stables	6 furlongs	1:07.86	$200,000	III	
2020	Wet Your Whistle	5	José L. Ortiz	Michael Trombetta	David W. Palmer	6 furlongs	1:07.87	$150,000	III	
2019	Final Frontier	4	Jose Lezcano	Thomas Albertrani	Godolphin Racing	6 furlongs	1:07.39	$150,000	Listed	
2018	Disco Partner	6	Irad Ortiz Jr.	Christophe Clement	Patricia A. Generazio	6 furlongs	1:08.50	$151,500		
2017	Disco Partner	5	Irad Ortiz Jr.	Christophe Clement	Patricia A. Generazio	6 furlongs	1:06.97	$147,000		
2016	Pure Sensation	5	Kendrick Carmouche	Christophe Clement	Patricia A. Generazio	6 furlongs	1:07.10	$150,000		

Legend:
Turf Dirt

== See also ==
List of American and Canadian Graded races
