= Overdrawn (horse) =

American-bred Thoroughbred racehorse

- Sire: Jack High
- Grandsire: John P. Grier
- Dam: Finita
- Damsire: St. James
- Sex: Gelding
- Foaled: 1938
- Country: United States
- Color: Chestnut
- Breeder: George D. Widener Jr.
- Owner: George D. Widener Jr. Dearborn Stable: (James Powers & Morton Donnelly)
- Trainer: Bert Mulholland; Dearborn Stable: C. Hyde Smith; Hubert H. "Pete" Battle
- Record: 61: 15-13-11
- Earnings: US$56,315

Major wins
- Flash Stakes (1940); Blackstone Handicap (1941); Jamaica Handicap (1941, 1942, 1943); Ritchie Handicap (1941); New Rochelle Handicap (1943)

Overdrawn (foaled 1939) was an American Thoroughbred racehorse best known for winning three straight editions of the Jamaica Handicap.

For his first two Jamaica Handicap wins, Overdrawn was raced by his breeder George D. Widener Jr. and trained by future U.S. Racing Hall of Fame inductee Bert Mulholland. In late summer of 1942, the four-year-old gelded Overdrawn was sold to the Dearborn Stable of Detroit, owned by James Powers & Morton Donnelly. C. Hyde Smith was the Dearborn Stable's trainer but it would be Pete Battle who was Overdrawn's trainer of record for his third Jamaica Handicap win in 1943. In addition to his Jamaica Handicap success, Overdrawn would win that fall's New Rochelle Handicap at the same track.

While a horse winning three consecutive runnings of any race is a rare feat, in the case of the Jamaica Handicap that happened a second time when Peter Markey's horse Piet won the race in 1949, 1950 and 1951.
