= Glen Cove Stakes =

- Class: Grade III
- Location: Belmont Park; Elmont, New York, United States
- Inaugurated: 2021
- Race type: Thoroughbred – Flat racing
- Website: NYRA

Race information
- Distance: 7 furlongs
- Surface: Turf
- Track: Left-handed
- Qualification: Three-year-old fillies
- Weight: 124 lbs with allowances
- Purse: $200,000 (since 2026)

The Glen Cove Stakes is a Grade III American Thoroughbred horse race for three year old fillies over a distance of seven furlongs on the turf held annually in October at Belmont Park in Elmont, New York. The event currently carries a purse of $200,000.

== History ==
The event is named after the city of Glen Cove in Nassau County, on the North Shore of Long Island.

The inaugural running of the event was on October 15, 2021 over a distance of 7 furlongs at Belmont Park and was won by the Michael J. Trombetta trained 19/1 longshot Aug Lites who defeated the favorite Bay Storm by a length and a quarter, in a time of 1:20.23.

The following year the event was moved to Aqueduct Racetrack and the distance was decreased to six furlongs.

In 2025 the event was upgraded to Grade III by the Thoroughbred Owners and Breeders Association.

In 2026 the event returned back to Belmont Park and was held in two division over a distance of seven furlongs.

== Records ==
Speed record:

- 6 furlongs: 1:07.38 - Ellen Jay (2024)
- 7 furlongs: 1:20.22 - Ground Support (2026)

Largest margin of victory:

- 3 3/4 lengths – Ground Support (2026)

Most wins by a jockey:

- 2 – Adam Beschizza (2023, 2026)
- 2 – Manuel Franco (2025, 2026)

Most wins by a trainer:

- 2 – Michael J. Trombetta (2021, 2022)
- 2 – Kelsey Danner (2023, 2026)

Most wins by an owner:

- 2 – NBS Stable (2023, 2026)

== Winners ==
Year	Winner	Jockey	Trainer	Owner	Distance	Time	Purse	Grade	Ref
At Belmont Park– Glen Cove Stakes
2026	Ground Support	Adam Beschizza	Kelsey Danner	NBS Stable	7 furlongs	1:20.22	$200,000	III	Division 1
2026	Lion Lake (IRE)	Manuel Franco	Brendan P. Walsh	Emcee Stable	7 furlongs	1:20.58	$200,000	III	Division 2
At Aqueduct
2025	Love Cervere	Manuel Franco	Miguel Clement	Edward A. Seltzer, Beverly Anderson & Reeves Thoroughbred Racing	6 furlongs	1:08.44	$175,000	III	
2024	Ellen Jay	Flavien Prat	Brad H. Cox	LNJ Foxwoods	6 furlongs	1:07.38	$139,500	Listed	
2023	Danse Macabre	Adam Beschizza	Kelsey Danner	NBS Stable & Elements Racing	6 furlongs	1:09.34	$125,000		
2022	Half Is Enough	Trevor McCarthy	Michael J. Trombetta	Ironhorse Racing Stable	6 furlongs	1:11.28	$120,000		
At Belmont Park
2021	Aug Lites	Jose Lezcano	Michael J. Trombetta	Commonwealth New Era Racing	7 furlongs	1:20.23	$100,000		

Legend:
Dirt Turf

== See also ==
- List of American and Canadian Graded races
