= Pebbles Stakes =

- Class: Grade III
- Location: Aqueduct Racetrack; Queens, New York, United States
- Inaugurated: 1993 (at Belmont Park)
- Race type: Thoroughbred – Flat racing
- Website: NYRA

Race information
- Distance: 1 mile
- Surface: Turf
- Track: Left-handed
- Qualification: Three-year-old fillies
- Weight: 124 lbs with allowances
- Purse: $175,000 (since 2024)

The Pebbles Stakes is a Grade III American Thoroughbred horse race for three year old fillies over a distance of one mile on the turf held annually in November at Aqueduct Racetrack in Queens, New York. The event currently carries a purse of $175,000.

== History ==
The event is named after Mohammed bin Rashid Al Maktoum’s champion grass mare Pebbles. This chestnut mare won the 1985 Breeders' Cup Turf at Aqueduct as a four-year-old. Also at the age of 4, she was voted the U.S. Champion Female Turf Horse, and Champion Older Mare and Champion Miler in England.

The inaugural running of the event was on 1 September 1993 over a distance of 1 1/16 miles and was won by Peter E. Blum's Statuette who won the event by a neck over the French bred mare Tricky Princess in a time of 1:40.68.

The following year the event was decreased to one mile but in 1995 the event was restored back to 1 1/16 miles.

From 1996 to 2003 the event was held under handicap conditions.

In 1998 the distance was increased again to 1 1/8 miles and the following year the event was classified as a Grade III event.

In 2001 the event was split into two divisions.

The event was run on the dirt track due to the conditions of the turf track in 1995, 2002 and 2005.

In 2005 the distance of the event was decreased to the current distance of one mile.

In 2020 due to the COVID-19 pandemic in the United States, NYRA did not schedule the event.

The American Graded Stakes Committee restored the event back to Grade III for 2022 after a period of 18 years. Also the event in 2022 was moved to Aqueduct Racetrack due to infield tunnel and redevelopment work at Belmont Park.

In 2025 the event was originally scheduled for November 16, but was rescheduled for a week later with an increase in distance to 1 1/16 miles and held on the outer turf course.

== Records ==
Speed record:

- 1 mile: 1:33.35 – Blowout (GB) (2019)
- 1 1/16 miles: 1:40.68 – Statuette (1993)
- 1 1/8 miles: 1:47.50 – Love n' Kiss S. (2001)

Largest margin of victory:

- 6 1/2 lengths – Peace Preserver (2012)

Most wins by a jockey:

- 6 – John R. Velazquez (1998, 2000, 2003, 2012, 2019, 2024)

Most wins by a trainer:

- 6 – Chad C. Brown (2015, 2017, 2018, 2019, 2022, 2023)

Most wins by an owner:

- 2 – Flaxman Holdings (2002, 2010)
- 2 – Klaravich Stables (2015, 2022)

== Winners ==
Year	Winner	Jockey	Trainer	Owner	Distance	Time	Purse	Grade	Ref
At Aqueduct – Pebbles Stakes
2025	Fast Market	Flavien Prat	John Terranova II	Hit The Bid Racing Stable	1 1/16 miles	1:43.22	$175,000	III	
2024	No Mo Candy	John R. Velazquez	Saffie Joseph Jr.	Niall J. Brennan & Michael J. Ryan	1 mile	1:34.84	$175,000	III	
2023	Implicated	Manuel Franco	Chad C. Brown	Bradley Thoroughbreds, Belmar Racing & Breeding, Cambron Equine & Laura Leigh Stable	1 mile	1:35.82	$200,000	III	
2022	Faith in Humanity (FR)	Manuel Franco	Chad C. Brown	Klaravich Stables	1 mile	1:36.36	$150,000	III	
At Belmont Park
2021	Spanish Loveaffair	Junior Alvarado	Mark E. Casse	Eclipse Thoroughbred Partners, Gary Barber & Michael Hernon	1 mile	1:34.13	$150,000	Listed	
2020	Race not held								
2019	Blowout (GB)	John R. Velazquez	Chad C. Brown	Peter M. Brant	1 mile	1:33.35	$206,700	Listed	
2018	Stella di Camelot (IRE)	Eric Cancel	Chad C. Brown	Madaket Stables, Michael Dubb, Kent Spellman & Bethlehem Stables	1 mile	1:38.58	$200,000	Listed	
2017	Rubilinda	Jose L. Ortiz	Chad C. Brown	Don Alberto Stable	1 mile	1:34.72	$200,000	Listed	
2016	Thundering Sky	Antonio A. Gallardo	George Weaver	Matthew Schera	1 mile	1:33.47	$200,000	Listed	
2015	Partisan Politics	Javier Castellano	Chad C. Brown	Klaravich Stables & William H. Lawrence	1 mile	1:34.43	$200,000	Listed	
2014	Lady Lara (IRE)	Junior Alvarado	William I. Mott	Ben Sangster	1 mile	1:35.31	$200,000	Listed	
2013	Discreet Marq	Irad Ortiz Jr.	Christophe Clement	Patricia A. Generazio	1 mile	1:34.19	$200,000	Listed	
2012	Peace Preserver	John R. Velazquez	Todd A. Pletcher	Alto Racing	1 mile	1:38.40	$150,000	Listed	
2011	Elusive Pearl	Ramon A. Dominguez	Michael J. Trombetta	Robert Goldsmith	1 mile	1:36.61	$100,000	Listed	
2010	Aruna	Ramon A. Dominguez	H. Graham Motion	Flaxman Holdings	1 mile	1:35.03	$100,000	Listed	
2009	Miss Catalyst	Javier Castellano	Todd A. Pletcher	Gulf Coast Farms & Arianne De Kwiatkowski	1 mile	1:34.18	$100,000	Listed	
2008	Remarkable Remy	Ramon A. Dominguez	John C. Kimmel	Live Oak Plantation	1 mile	1:35.65	$121,000	Listed	
2007	Cat Charmer	Eibar Coa	H. Graham Motion	Donald A. Adam	1 mile	1:34.85	$111,000	Listed	
2006	Quite a Bride	Cornelio Velasquez	William I. Mott	Haras Santa Maria de Araras	1 mile	1:33.56	$110,600	Listed	
2005	Cayuga's Waters	Jerry D. Bailey	William I. Mott	Laue Ranch	1 mile	1:37.19	$110,900	Listed	
2004	Fortunate Damsel	Javier Castellano	Heriberto Cedano	Spruce Pond Stable	1 1/8 miles	1:48.80	$112,300	III	
Pebbles Handicap
2003	Betty's Wish	John R. Velazquez	Robert J. Frankel	Edmund A. Gann	1 1/8 miles	1:51.00	$110,300	III	
2002	Glia	Javier Castellano	Robert J. Frankel	Flaxman Holdings	1 1/8 miles	1:49.68	$114,300	Listed	
2001	Heads Will Roll (GB)	Edgar S. Prado	Robert J. Frankel	Amerman Racing	1 1/8 miles	1:47.75	$110,100	III	Division 1
2001	Love n' Kiss S.	Jose A. Santos	Christophe Clement	Lael Stables	1 1/8 miles	1:47.50	$110,600	III	Division 2
2000	Lady Dora	John R. Velazquez	Michael R. Matz	Fitz Eugene Dixon Jr.	1 1/8 miles	1:48.76	$87,075	III	
1999	Eze	Robbie Davis	William H. Turner Jr.	Carlos C. Perez	1 1/8 miles	1:52.96	$83,250	III	
1998	Sophie My Love	John R. Velazquez	Richard E. Mandella	Arthur A. Seeligson III & Ramona S. Bass	1 1/8 miles	1:52.23	$85,250	Listed	
1997	Heaven's Command (GB)	Jose A. Santos	Nicolas Clement	Ecurie Slymarc Farm	1 1/16 miles	1:42.81	$85,625	Listed	
1996	Rare Blend	Gary L. Stevens	Claude R. McGaughey III	H. Joseph Allen	1 1/16 miles	1:44.47	$86,850	Listed	
Pebbles Stakes
1995	Queen Tutta	Gary L. Stevens	Mark A. Hennig	Edward P. Evans	1 1/16 miles	1:43.27	$89,700	Listed	
1994	Saxuality	Julie Krone	William V. Terrill	Leslie L. Alexander	1 mile	1:34.13	$69,300	Listed	
1993	Statuette	Mike E. Smith	Richard DeStasio	Peter E. Blum	1 1/16 miles	1:40.68	$75,100	Listed	

Legend:
Dirt Turf

== See also ==
- List of American and Canadian Graded races
