= Awad (horse) =

American-bred Thoroughbred racehorse

- Sire: Caveat
- Grandsire: Cannonade
- Dam: Dancer's Candy
- Damsire: Noble Dancer
- Sex: Stallion
- Foaled: January 25, 1990; Ryehill Farm, near Mount Airy, Maryland
- Died: July 23, 2011 (aged 21); Old Friends Equine, Kentucky
- Country: United States
- Colour: Bay
- Owner: Jim Ryan
- Trainer: David G. Donk
- Record: 70: 14-10-11
- Earnings: US$3,270,131

Major wins
- Secretariat Stakes (1993); Arlington Million (1995); Manhattan Handicap (1995); Sword Dancer Invitational Handicap (1997)

Honours
- Awad Stakes at Belmont Park; Maryland-bred Champion Turf Horse (1993, 1995, 1996, 1997); Maryland Thoroughbred Hall of Fame (2015)
- Last updated on February 12, 2026

Awad (1990 – 2011) was an American Thoroughbred racehorse that raced primarily in the United States in the mid-1990s. He was owned by Jim Ryan, who named him after the Palestinian peace activist Mubarak Awad.

Trained by David G. Donk, Awad was a successful racehorse, achieving four Grade 1 victories, and earning over three million dollars in prize money. His victory at the 1995 Arlington Million at a time of 1:58:69 was a course record at the time, eventually surpassed by Set Piece in 2023. Having won the Secretariat Stakes in 1993, Awad was the first horse to win both Grade 1 turf tracks at Arlington Park.

After starting in 70 races, Awad retired from racing to stand as a stud at Northview Stallion Station in Chesapeake City in 1999, transferring to their Pennsylvania farm in 2005. He retired from active duty the year after in 2006, living out the rest of his life at the Old Friends Equine retirement stable in Kentucky. He died on July 23, 2011, from a heart attack.

Since 2012, Belmont Park has run the Awad Stakes, a 1-1/16 mile turf race on the turf for 2 year old horses, in honor of the horse. Awad was inducted into the Maryland Throughbred Hall of Fame in 2015.
