= Manuel Franco (jockey) =

Puerto Rican jockey (born 1994)

Manny Franco
Personal information
- Born: December 19, 1994 (age 31) Carolina, Puerto Rico
- Occupation: Jockey

Horse racing career
- Sport: Horse racing
- Career wins: 2,146 as of July 7, 2024 (ongoing)

Major racing wins
- Pegasus World Cup Turf Invitational Stakes (2026); Turf Classic Stakes (2025); Belmont Derby Invitational Stakes (2025); Jockey Club Derby Invitational Stakes (2025); Gulfstream Park Oaks (2025); Pilgrim Stakes (2025); Transylvania Stakes (2025); Elite Power Stakes (2025); Glen Cove Stakes (2025); Alcibiades Stakes (2024); Kingston Stakes (2024); Spinaway Stakes (2024); Sands Point Stakes (2024); New Kent County Virginia Derby (2024); Bayakoa Stakes (2024); Belmont Turf Sprint Stakes (2024); Ballston Spa Stakes (2023); Ballston Spa Stakes (2023); Bowling Green Stakes (2023); Bold Ruler Stakes (2023); Pebbles Stakes (2023); Comely Stakes (2023); Manhattan Stakes (2022); Wonder Again Stakes (2022); Tom Fool Handicap (2022); Waya Stakes (2022); Belmont Turf Sprint Stakes (2022); Fall Highweight Handicap (2022); Monmouth Stakes (2022); Pebbles Stakes (2022); Futurity Stakes (2022); Diana Stakes (2021); Westchester Stakes (2021); Travers Stakes (2020); Florida Derby (2020); Sword Dancer Stakes (2020); Joe Hirsch Turf Classic Stakes (2020); Churchill Distaff Turf Mile Stakes (2020); Edgewood Stakes (2020); Gulfstream Park Mile Stakes (2020); Raven Run Stakes (2020); Holy Bull Stakes (2020); Dowager Stakes (2020); Champagne Stakes (2019); Carter Handicap (2019, 2025); Hudson Stakes (NYB) (2019); Jaipur Invitational Stakes (2019); Jimmy Winkfield Stakes (2019); Gazelle Stakes (2019); Ruffian Stakes (2019); Selima Stakes (2019); Twin Spires Turf Sprint Stakes (2019); Distaff Handicap (2019) Chilukki Stakes (2018); Demoiselle Stakes (2018); Dixie Stakes (2018); Excelsior Stakes (2018); Glens Falls Stakes (2018); Jockey Club Gold Cup Stakes (2018); Lake George Stakes (2018); Sheepshead Bay Stakes (2018, 2023); Nashua Stakes (2018); Penn Mile Stakes (2018); Pilgrim Stakes (2018); Union Avenue Stakes (2018); Bay Shore Stakes (2017); East View Stakes (2017); Excelsior Stakes (2018); Fourstardave Handicap (2017); Hill Prince Stakes (2017); Phoenix Stakes (2017); Remsen Stakes (2017); With Anticipation Stakes (2017); Cicada Stakes (2016); Correction Stakes (2016); Gander Stakes (2016); Ladies Handicap (2016, 2018); Frizette Stakes (2016); Vosburgh Stakes (2016); True North Stakes (2016); Commonwealth Derby (2016); Dr. James Penny Memorial Handicap (2015); Empire Classic Handicap (2015); Withers Stakes (2015, 2016, 2023); Maid of the Mist Stakes (2014); New York Derby (2014); Queens County Handicap (2014) Breeders' Cup wins: Breeders' Cup Juvenile Fillies (2024); Breeders' Cup Juvenile Fillies Turf (2019) U.S. Triple Crown series: Belmont Stakes (2020)

Significant horses
- Catholic Boy, Immersive, Sharing, Tiz the Law, World Approval, Spirit of Saint Louis, World of Trouble

Manuel "Manny" Franco (born December 19, 1994) is a Puerto Rican professional jockey, best known for winning the 2020 Belmont Stakes riding Tiz the Law.

Listed at 5 feet 1 inch (1.55 m) and 112 pounds (51 kg), Franco has been riding professionally since 2013. Franco won his first graded stakes in 2015 aboard Coffee Clique in the Grade 3 Dr. James Penny Memorial Handicap and won his first Grade 1 win on Oct 16, 2016 aboard Joking. He won his second Grade 1 a week later. On October 29, 2023, he earned career wins number 1,999 and 2,000 in the first two races at "Belmont at the Big A" at Aqueduct.
