= Maid of the Mist Stakes =

The Maid of the Mist is an American Thoroughbred horse race for New York-bred two-year-old fillies run at Belmont Park each year during its celebration of New York born horses. All the races on that day's card are for New Yorkers. Set at one mile, it currently offers a purse of $250,000.

Named for the seven steamboats that over the years have navigated on upstate New York's Niagara River, the Maid of the Mist will be in its 24th running in 2017.

Run at a distance of a mile and a sixteenth in 1994, it became a mile in 1995. For one year, 1996, it was held at Aqueduct Racetrack.

== Winners (from the beginning) ==
- 2016 - Bonita Bianca (Irad Ortiz, Jr.)
- 2015 - Super Surprise (John R. Velazquez)
- 2014 - Quezon (Manuel Franco)
- 2010 - Sentimental Lass (Rajiv Maragh)
- 2009 - Mineralogist
- 2008 - Stormy’s Smile (Jose Lezcano)
- 2007 - Expect the End (Rafael Bejarano)
- 2006 - Grand Merger (Kent Desormeaux)
- 2005 - Cinderella's Dream (John Velazquez)
- 2004 - Pelham Bay (Shaun Bridgemohan)
- 2003 - Capeside Lady (John Velazquez)
- 2002 - Beautiful America (José A. Santos)
- 2001 - Princess Dixie (Edgar Prado)
- 2000 - My Lady Avie (John Velazquez)
- 1999 - Maddie May (John Velazquez)
- 1998 - Electric Shock (Pat Day)
- 1997 - Lavish Numbers (Jorge Chavez)
- 1996 - Aristie (Jerry Bailey)
- 1995 - Light Up New York (Mike E. Smith)
- 1994 - Friendly Beauty (Jorge Chavez)
