= Belmont Derby =

Belmont Derby Stakes
- Class: Grade I
- Location: Belmont Park; Elmont, New York, United States
- Inaugurated: 1929 (as Jamaica Handicap)
- Race type: Thoroughbred – Flat racing
- Website: www.nyra.com

Race information
- Distance: 1 1/4 miles (10 furlongs)
- Surface: Turf
- Track: Left-handed
- Qualification: Three-year-olds
- Weight: Northern Hemisphere: Colts & Geldings 122 lbs. Fillies 119 lbs. Southern Hemisphere: Colts and Geldings 126 lbs. Fillies 123 lbs.
- Purse: US$750,000 (2023)

The Belmont Derby is an American Grade I stakes race for three-year-old Thoroughbred race horse run over a distance of 1 1/4 miles on the turf at Belmont Park in July. The purse for the 2023 race is US$750,000.

== Race history ==
In 2014, the race became a feature portion of the now defunct Stars and Stripes Racing Festival at Belmont Park. The race was renamed from the Jamaica Handicap, moved from October to July, increased in distance from 1 1/8 miles to 1 1/4 miles, and had the purse increased from $500,000 to $1,250,000.

The original race name was named after the Jamaica District in Queens, New York. The first running took place in 1929 at the Jamaica Race Course. When the Jamaica track closed in 1959, the race was shifted to the Aqueduct Race Track in Queens where it was contested in 1960, 1975 to 1977, 1979 to 1981, and 1987.

It was raced at a distance of six furlongs from 1929 to 1953 and 1957 to 1960, then at 1 1/8 miles (9 furlongs) in 1954, and from 1997 through 2014.

The Jamaica Handicap was open to horses age three and older from 1929 to 1944, 1949 to 1953, and again in 1960. It has been a turf race since 1994.

The Jamaica wasn't run from 1933 to 1935, in 1955 and 1956, from 1961 to 1976, nor in 1995 (due to severe weather conditions). It was run in two divisions in 1946.

In 2009, the Jamaica became a Grade I event.

Of interest is that any horse winning three editions of a single race is a rare occurrence but the Jamaica Handicap had two horses accomplish that feat when it was open to older horses.

== Records ==
=== Belmont Derby / Jamaica Handicap ===
Speed record: (at current distance of 1 1/4 miles)

- 1:58.29 – Henley's Joy (2019)

Most wins:

- 3 – Overdrawn (1941, 1942, 1943)
- 3 – Piet (1949, 1950, 1951)

Most wins by an owner:

- 4 – George D. Widener Jr. (1931, 1936, 1941, 1942)

Most wins by a jockey:

- 4 – Richard Migliore (1984, 1986, 1996, 2004)

Most wins by a trainer:

- 3 – R. Emmett Potts (1949, 1950, 1951)
- 3 – Bert Mulholland (1936, 1941, 1942)
- 3 – C. R. McGaughey III (1987, 1990, 2014)
- 3 – William I. Mott (2000, 2003, 2008)
- 3 – Todd A. Pletcher (2002, 2009, 2023)

== Winners ==
Year	Winner	Age	Jockey	Trainer	Owner	Time	Purse	Grade	Distance
Belmont Derby Stakes
2026	Title Role (GB)	3	John R. Velazquez	Simon & Ed Crisford	Will Stroud, Derrick Smith, Mrs. John Magnier & Michael Tabor	1:47.55	$750,000	I	1 1/8 miles
Belmont Derby Invitational Stakes
2025	Test Score	3	Manuel Franco	H. Graham Motion	Amerman Racing LLC	1:45.56	$750,000	I	1 1/8 miles
2024	Trikari	3	John R. Velazquez	H. Graham Motion	Amerman Racing LLC	1:54.79	$750,000	I	1 1/4 miles
2023	Far Bridge	3	José Ortiz	Todd A. Pletcher	LSU Stables	2:01.75	$750,000	I	1 1/4 miles
2022	Classic Causeway	3	Julien Leparoux	Kenneth G. McPeek	Kentucky West Racing LLC & Cooper, Clarke M.	1:59.99	$1,000,000	I	1 1/4 miles
2021	Bolshoi Ballet (IRE)	3	Ryan Moore	Aidan O'Brien	Derrick Smith, Mrs. John Magnier, Michael Tabor & Westerberg	2:04.42	$1,000,000	I	1 1/4 miles
2020	Gufo	3	Junior Alvarado	Christophe Clement	Otter Bend Stables	2:02.25	$250,000	I	1 1/4 miles
2019	Henley's Joy	3	Jose Lezcano	Michael J. Maker	Bloom Racing Stable	1:58.29	$1,000,000	I	1 1/4 miles
2018	Catholic Boy	3	Javier Castellano	Jonathan Thomas	Robert LaPenta, Madaket Stables, Siena Farm, & Twin Creeks Racing Stables	1:59.28	$1,200,000	I	1 1/4 miles
2017	Oscar Performance	3	José Ortiz	Brian A. Lynch	Amerman Racing (Jerry & Joan Amerman)	2:00.25	$1,200,000	I	1 1/4 miles
2016	Deauville (IRE)	3	Jamie Spencer	Aidan O'Brien	Hay, Smith, Magnier and Tabor	2:00.51	$1,250,000	I	1 1/4 miles
2015	Force the Pass	3	Joel Rosario	Alan E. Goldberg	Richard Santulli	2:01.16	$1,250,000	I	1 1/4 miles
2014	Mr Speaker	3	Jose Lezcano	C. R. McGaughey III	Phipps Stable	2:01.14	$1,250,000	I	1 1/4 miles
Jamaica Handicap
2013	Up With the Birds	3	Cornelio Velásquez	Malcolm Pierce	Sam-Son Farms	1:48.74	$500,000	I	1 1/8 miles
2012	King David	3	Rosie Napravnik	Michael J. Maker	Scarlet Stable	1:52.91	$400,000	I	1 1/8 miles
2011	Western Aristocrat	3	Corey Nakatani	Jeremy Noseda	Vinery Stables	1:50.34	$250,000	I	1 1/8 miles
2010	Prince Will I Am	3	Jose Lezcano	Michelle Nihei	Casa Farms	1:50.07	$250,000	I	1 1/8 miles
2009	Take the Points	3	Edgar Prado	Todd A. Pletcher	Starlight Partners	1:48.51	$300,000	I	1 1/8 miles
2008	Court Vision	3	Ramon Domínguez	William I. Mott	IEAH Stables/WinStar	1:49.75	$250,000	II	1 1/8 miles
2007	Nobiz Like Shobiz	3	Javier Castellano	Barclay Tagg	Elizabeth Valando	1:46.80	$300,000	II	1 1/8 miles
2006	Showing Up	3	Cornelio Velásquez	Barclay Tagg	Lael Stable	1:47.81	$300,000	II	1 1/8 miles
2005	Watchmon	3	Javier Castellano	Pat Reynolds	Paul Pompa Jr.	1:49.28	$300,000	III	1 1/8 miles
2004	Artie Schiller	3	Richard Migliore	James A. Jerkens	Timber Bay Farm et al.	1:45.50	$200,000	II	1 1/8 miles
2003	Stroll	3	Jerry Bailey	William I. Mott	Claiborne Farm	1:46.02	$200,000	II	1 1/8 miles
2002	Finality	3	John Velazquez	Todd A. Pletcher	Dogwood Stable	1:46.66	$200,000	II	1 1/8 miles
2001	Navesink	3	Edgar Prado	Alan E. Goldberg	Jayeff B Stables	1:51.53	$200,000	II	1 1/8 miles
2000	King Cugat	3	Jerry Bailey	William I. Mott	Centennial Farms	1:49.63	$200,000	II	1 1/8 miles
1999	Monarch's Maze	3	Joe Bravo	Patrick J. Kelly	Live Oak Plantation Racing	1:51.66	$150,000	II	1 1/8 miles
1998	Vergennes	3	John Velazquez	Mark Hennig	December Hill Farm	1:50.42	$150,000	II	1 1/8 miles
1997	Subordination	3	Jorge Chavez	Gary Sciacca	Klaravich Stable	1:49.00	$150,000	II	1 1/8 miles
1996	Allied Forces	3	Richard Migliore	Kiaran McLaughlin	Ahmed Al Tayer	1:40.91	$125,000	II	1 1/16 miles
1995	Race not run								
1994	Pennine Ridge	3	John Velazquez	David G. Donk	December Hill Farm	1:35.13	$100,000	II	1 mile
Race run on dirt track
1993	Mi Cielo	3	Mike E. Smith	Peter M. Vestal	Thomas M. Carey	1:35.20	$100,000	II	1 mile
1992	West by West	3	Jean-Luc Samyn	George R. Arnold II	John H. Peace	1:34.27	$100,000	II	1 mile
1991	Sultry Song	3	Chris Antley	Patrick J. Kelly	Live Oak Plantation Racing	1:34.44	$100,000	II	1 mile
1990	Confidential Talk	3	Jorge Chavez	C. R. McGaughey III	Ogden Phipps	1:35.60	$75,000	II	1 mile
1989	Domasca Don	3	Sandy Hawley	Robert P. Tiller	Frank Di Giulio Sr.	1:35.40	$100,000	II	1 mile
1988	Ruhlmann	3	Gary Stevens	Robert J. Frankel	Jerome S. Moss	1:35.40	$100,000	II	1 mile
1987	Stacked Pack	3	Randy Romero	C. R. McGaughey III	Ogden Phipps	1:34.80	$75,000	III	1 mile
1986	Waquoit	3	Richard Migliore	Guido Federico	Joseph Federico	1:34.20	$75,000	III	1 mile
1985	Don's Choice	3	Don MacBeth	Marvin L. Moncrief	Sondra D. Bender	1:36.00	$75,000	III	1 mile
1984	Raja's Shark	3	Richard Migliore	Mark E. Casse	Irwin Feiner	1:36.60	$75,000	III	1 mile
1983	Bounding Basque	3	Gregg McCarron	Woodrow Sedlacek	J. D. Wimpfheimer	1:34.00	$75,000	III	1 mile
1982	John's Gold	3	Ángel Cordero Jr.	H. Allen Jerkens	Hobeau Farm	1:37.00	$50,000	III	1 mile
1981	Pass The Tab	3	Jorge Velásquez	Albert Barrera	Leopoldo Villareal	1:35.20	$50,000	III	1 mile
1980	Far Out East	3	Cash Asmussen	Thomas J. Kelly	John M. Schiff	1:34.00	$50,000	III	1 mile
1979	Belle's Gold	3	Laffit Pincay Jr.	Walter A. Kelley	John R. Murrell	1:33.60	$50,000	III	1 mile
1978	Regal And Royal	3	Jeffrey Fell	Warren A. Croll Jr.	Aisco Stable	1:35.00	$50,000	III	1 mile
1977	Affiliate	3	Ángel Cordero Jr.	Lazaro S. Barrera	Harbor View Farm	1:35.20	$50,000		1 mile
1976	Dance Spell	3	Ruben Hernandez	James W. Maloney	Christiana Stable	1:34.00	$50,000	II	1 mile
1975	Funalon	3	Vincent Bracciale Jr.	Leonard Imperio	Old Bombast Farm (F. Di Paolo/J. Mavronicela/A. Pamiccia/L. Imperio)	1:34.00	$50,000	II	1 mile
1961–74	Race not scheduled								
1960	Rare Rice	4	Ray Broussard	Clyde Troutt	Ada L. Rice	1:10.60			6 furlongs
1959	Crafty Skipper	3	Bobby Ussery	Lucien Laurin	Charfran Stable	1:09.60			6 furlongs
1958	Levelation	3	Paul J. Bailey	A G (Bob) Robertson	Warner Stable	1:10.80			6 furlongs
1957	Pertshire	3	Ted Atkinson	Hirsch Jacobs	Ethel D. Jacobs	1:11.20			6 furlongs
1956	Race not run								
1955	Race not run								
1954	Magic Lamp	4	Bill Shoemaker	Preston M. Burch	Brookmeade Stable	1:50.00			1 1/8 miles
1953	Sagittarius	7	Bennie Green	William G. Williams	Winding Way Farm	1:11.00			6 furlongs
1952	Tea-Maker	9	Hedley Woodhouse	J. Dallet Byers	F. Ambrose Clark	1:11.20			6 furlongs
1951	Piet	6	Jim Nichols	R. Emmett Potts	Peter A. Markey	1:11.20			6 furlongs
1950	Piet	5	Nick Combest	R. Emmett Potts	Peter A. Markey	1:11.20			6 furlongs
1949	Piet	4	Chris Rogers	R. Emmett Potts	Peter A. Markey	1:11.40			6 furlongs
1948	Royal Blood	3	Douglas Dodson	James W. Smith	Maine Chance Farm	1:13.00			6 furlongs
1947	Jet Pilot	3	Johnny Longden	Tom Smith	Maine Chance Farm	1:11.60			6 furlongs
1946	Bonnie Beryl	3	James Stout	Jim Fitzsimmons	Belair Stud	1:11.40			6 furlongs
1946	Blunt Remark	3	Basil James	Buster Millerick	Frank Frankel	1:13.20			6 furlongs
1945	War Jeep	3	John H. Adams	Tom Smith	Maine Chance Farm	1:11.40			6 furlongs
1944	Doublrab	6	Eddie Arcaro	Harris B. Brown	Lillian Christopher	1:11.40			6 furlongs
1943	Overdrawn	5	Sterling Young	Pete Battle	Dearborn Stable (James Powers & Morton Donnelly)	1:13.00			6 furlongs
1942	Overdrawn	4	Nick Coule	Bert Mulholland	George D. Widener Jr.	1:12.40			6 furlongs
1941	Overdrawn	3	Herb Lindberg	Bert Mulholland	George D. Widener Jr.	1:11.80			6 furlongs
1940	Wise Bee	3	Don Meade	Merritt A. Buxton	William H. Gallagher	1:12.60			6 furlongs
1939	Fighting Fox	4	James Stout	Jim Fitzsimmons	Belair Stud	1:12.00			6 furlongs
1938	Clodion	4	Nick Wall	Walter A. Carter	Walter A. Carter	1:12.20			6 furlongs
1937	Whopper	5	Harry Richards	Duval A. Headley	Hal Price Headley	1:11.60			6 furlongs
1936	Sation	6	John Gilbert	Bert Mulholland	George D. Widener Jr.	1:10.80			6 furlongs
1935	Race not run								
1934	Race not run								
1933	Race not run								
1932	Halcyon	4	Earl Steffen	Thomas J. Healey	C. V. Whitney	1:12.60			6 furlongs
1931	Panetian	3	Linus McAtee	A. Jack Joyner	George D. Widener Jr.	1:12.40			6 furlongs
1930	Judge Schilling	5	Frank Catrone	Fred E. Kraft	Rudolph Spreckels	1:11.40			6 furlongs
1929	Polydor	4	Mack Garner	William J. Spiers	William Ziegler Jr.	1:11.80			6 furlongs

* In 1954 Tea-maker, who won this race in 1952, finished first again but was disqualified.

== See also ==
List of American and Canadian Graded races
