= Commonwealth Turf Cup =

American Thoroughbred horse race

- Location: Laurel Park; Laurel, Maryland
- Inaugurated: 2005
- Race type: Thoroughbred – Flat racing

Race information
- Distance: 1 mile
- Surface: Turf
- Track: Left-handed
- Qualification: Three-year-olds and up
- Weight: Allowance conditions
- Purse: $200,000 (2016)

The Commonwealth Turf Cup is an American Thoroughbred horse race held each year since 2015 at Laurel Park in Laurel, Maryland. It was previously known as the Colonial Turf Cup when it was held at Colonial Downs race track in New Kent County, Virginia. It is raced on turf at a distance of one mile and is open to horses aged three years old and up. The current purse is $200,000.

In 2009, the race was upgraded from a Grade III to a Grade II event. In 2011, the race changed its conditions to allow entry of older horses. This change caused the race to lose its graded status until 2013, when it again became a Grade II event.

From 2005 to 2013, the race was run at 1 3/16 miles. For the 2015 renewal, the distance was shortened to 1 1/8 miles, and in 2016 to 1 mile.

== Records ==
Fastest time:

- 1 3/16 miles : 1:52.98 Showing Up (2006)

Most wins by an owner:

- 1 – No owner has won the Colonial Turf Cup more than once

Most wins by a jockey:

- 1 – No jockey has won the Colonial Turf Cup more than once

Most wins by a Trainer:

- 2 – Todd Pletcher (2005, 2012)

== Winners of the Commonwealth Turf Cup ==
Year	Winner	Age	Jockey	Trainer	Owner	Distance (Miles)	Time	Grade
2016	Blacktype	5	Trevor McCarthy	Christophe Clement	Jump Sucker Stable	1	1:33.43	II
2015	Mr. Speaker	3	José Ortiz	Shug McGaughey	Phipps Stable	1-1/8	1:47.30	II
2014	Race not held							
2013	London Lane	6	Horatio Karamanos	Lawrence Murray	Howard M. Bender	1-3/16	1:55.40	II
2012	Turbo Compressor	4	Joe Bravo	Todd A. Pletcher	P & G Stable	1-3/16	1:55.00	
2011	Rahystrada	7	Sheldon Russell	Byron Hughes	Robert Courtney	1-3/16	1:54.68	
2010	Paddy O'Prado	3	Kent Desormeaux	Dale Romans	Donegal Racing	1-3/16	1:54.20	II
2009	Battle of Hastings	3	Tyler Baze	Jeff Mullins	Michael House	1-3/16	1:57.79	II
2008	Sailor's Cap	3	Alan Garcia	James J. Toner	Team Valor International	1-3/16	2:04.42	III
2007	Summer Doldrums	3	Jose Lezcano	Richard A. Violette Jr.	Klaravich Stables	1-3/16	1:55.68	III
2006	Showing Up	3	Cornelio Velásquez	Barclay Tagg	Lael Stables	1-3/16	1:52.98	
2005	English Channel	3	John Velazquez	Todd Pletcher	James T. Scatuorchio	1-3/16	1:56:37	
