= Dale Romans =

American Thoroughbred racehorse trainer (born 1966)

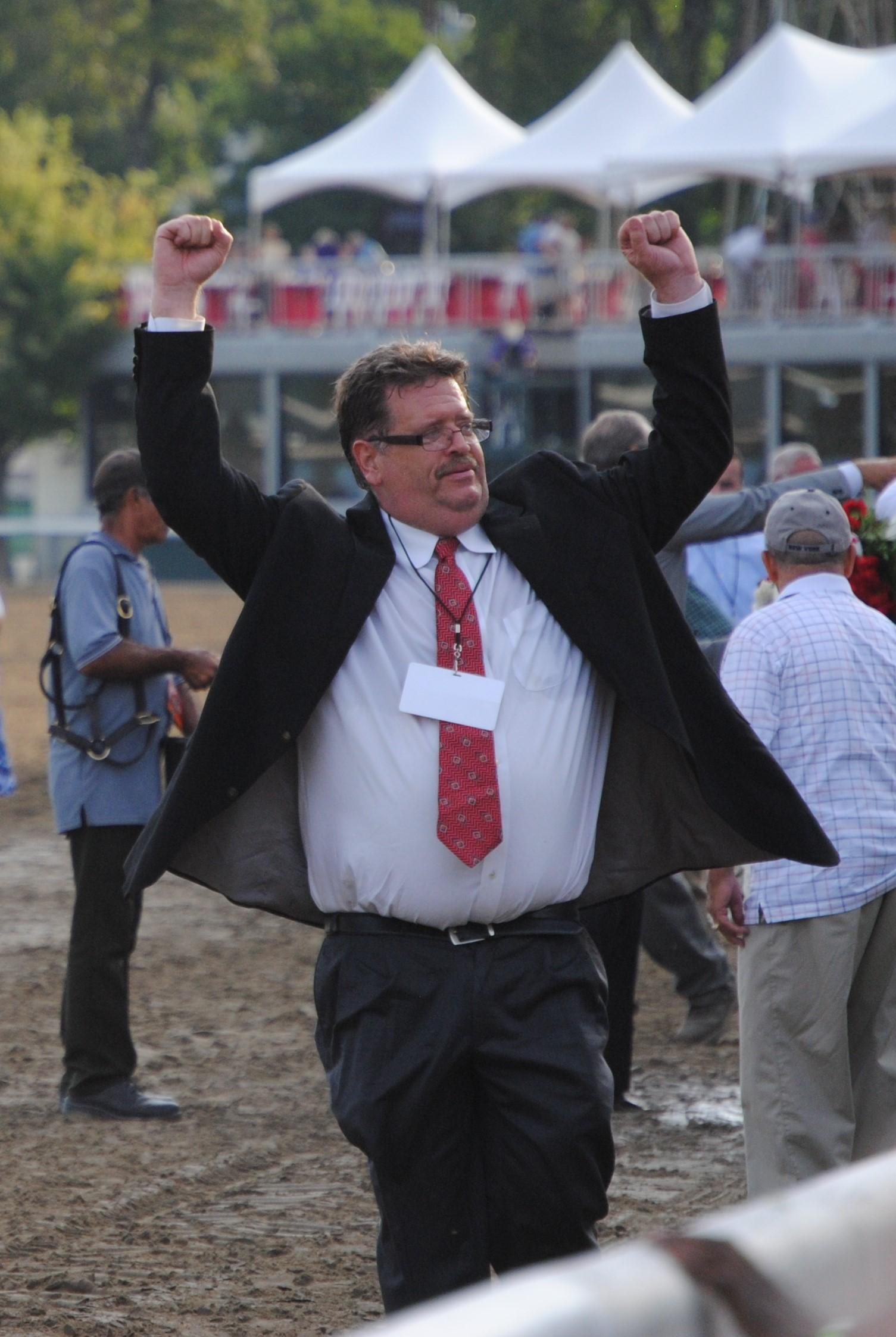
- Dale Romans celebrates victory in the 2015 Travers Stakes

Personal information
- Born: August 14, 1966 (age 59) Louisville, Kentucky, U.S.
- Occupation: Trainer

Horse racing career
- Sport: Horse racing
- Career wins: 1,856+ (ongoing)

Major racing wins
- Gardenia Handicap (2002, 2004, 2008, 2014); Cornhusker Handicap (2004); Whitney Handicap (2004); Secretariat Stakes (2004, 2010); Joe Hirsch Turf Classic (2004, 2013); Breeders' Futurity Stakes (2005, 2011, 2015); West Virginia Governor's Stakes (2005, 2007); La Troienne Stakes (2006, 2015); Shadwell Turf Mile Stakes (2008, 2013); Ruffian Handicap (2009); Shoemaker Mile Stakes (2009); Edgewood Stakes (2011); Just A Game Stakes (2011, 2012); Princess Rooney Stakes (2011); Humana Distaff Handicap (2011); Metropolitan Handicap (2012); Turf Classic (2012); Clark Handicap (2012); First Lady Stakes (2012); Arlington Million (2012); Pacific Classic (2012); Blue Grass Stakes (2012, 2016); La Brea Stakes (2015); Travers Stakes (2015) American Classics wins: Preakness Stakes (2011) Breeders' Cup wins: Breeders' Cup Juvenile Fillies Turf (2009); Breeders' Cup Mile (2011); Breeders' Cup Turf (2012) International race wins: Dubai World Cup (2005)

Racing awards
- Eclipse Award for Outstanding Trainer (2012); Big Sport of Turfdom Award (2012)

Significant horses
- Dullahan, Keen Ice, Kitten's Joy, Little Mike, Paddy O'Prado, Roses in May, Shackleford, Tapitsfly, Court Vision

Dale Lewis Romans (born August 14, 1966) is an American Thoroughbred racehorse trainer, best known for winning the 2011 Preakness Stakes with Shackleford and the Breeders' Cup Turf with Little Mike. He also upset American Pharoah in the 2015 Travers Stakes with Keen Ice. He won the 2012 Eclipse Award for Outstanding Trainer.

In November 2025, Romans announced his candidacy for the U.S. Senator from the state of Kentucky in the 2026 election. He ran as a Democrat, losing the nomination to Charles Booker.

== Background and early career ==
Dale Romans is the son of trainer Jerry Romans and grew up around horses at Churchill Downs in Louisville. He graduated from Butler High School in 1984 despite having dyslexia. Romans worked for his father from a young age. He once said, "I had a way with the horses. I could walk the worst horse in the country when I was 10 years old. My parents were divorced, and if my father had a bad horse he couldn't get on the van he'd come and get me at home to load the horse. I don't know what it was about horses, but they saved me as a child. The guys who worked for my dad took me in and I always felt at home here. I didn't have to worry about reading and writing. I could communicate with the horses. Whatever primal instinct we have with horses, we're connected to them."

At age eighteen, Romans embarked on a career as a trainer, getting his first winner on February 15, 1987, at Turfway Park with Miss Mindy, who he had purchased for $1,500. His career was slow to take off. He won only four races in each of 1987 and 1989, and only 21 races in each of 1988 and 1990. It was not until 1991 that he won his first stakes race at Turfway Park with Morning Punch, and not until 1996 that he won his first graded stakes race at Aqueduct with Victor Avenue.

Romans has been in a long-term relationship with Tammy Fox since the early 1990s. Fox is an exercise rider for the Romans stable, and was formerly a jockey. She was the first woman jockey to ride in the Blue Grass Stakes, finishing fourth in 1991. She retired from racing in 2005 after a career that included 236 wins. The couple live in Louisville and have two children, Bailey and Jake.

Jerry Romans once trained from Barn 4 at Churchill Downs, which is now one of two barns used by his son. Romans said, "We have a great team from top to bottom. We have hotwalkers that have been with us for over 10 years. My assistants have been together since we were 19 and 20 working for my father. And Tammy is a huge part of the stable. She breezes all the horses, and there is nobody that gives a better line on a horse than she does."

== Career ==
Romans' career slowly grew, with 2004 marking his breakout year when he jumped to the #8 ranked trainer by earnings in North America. He achieved his first grade I victory with Roses in May in the 2004 Whitney Handicap, and followed up with victories by Kitten's Joy in the 2004 Secretariat Stakes and the Joe Hirsch Turf Classic Invitational Handicap. Kitten's Joy also ran second to Better Talk Now in the 2004 Breeders' Cup Turf and was voted the Eclipse Award for American Champion Male Turf Horse.

In 2005, Roses in May provided Romans with the biggest payday of his career to date when he won the $6 million Dubai World Cup. Unfortunately, Roses In May was then diagnosed with a tendon injury and was retired.

In 2006, Romans earned his 1,000th career victory on June 11 with Haiaccept at Churchill Downs. Later that year though, he parted ways with owners Kenneth and Sarah Ramsey, for whom he had trained both Roses in May and Kitten's Joy. It would take several years for Romans' stable to recover.

Romans collected his first Breeders' Cup win in 2009 when Tapitsfly won the Breeders' Cup Juvenile Fillies Turf. In 2010, the Romans-trained Paddy O'Prado finished third in the Kentucky Derby, while First Dude finished second in the Preakness Stakes and third in the Belmont.

The next year, Shackleford gained Romans his first Classic win in the 2011 Preakness Stakes after finishing fourth in the Derby. Romans said, "It shows that anybody that gets started in the horse business can do this because, Lord knows, 25 years ago nobody thought I'd sit up here and talk about (winning) a classic race." Shackleford finished second in the Breeders' Cup Dirt Mile, while Court Vision won the Breeders' Cup Turf. Romans finished 2011 ranked #8 in North America by earnings.

In 2012, Romans had another outstanding year, winning three Grade 1 races with Little Mike alone – the Woodford Reserve Turf Classic, Arlington Million, and Breeders' Cup Turf. That year, Romans also trained Dullahan to victories in the Blue Grass Stakes and The Pacific Classic, plus a third-place finish in the Kentucky Derby, Shackleford won the Metropolitan Handicap and Clark Handicap, while Tapitsfly earned Grade I victories in the Just A Game and First Lady Stakes. Romans finished the year ranked #4 in North American trainer's earnings and also earned the Eclipse Award for Outstanding Trainer and the Big Sport of Turfdom Award.

Romans is also the trainer of Keen Ice, notable for his August 2015 win over Triple Crown-winner American Pharoah in the Travers Stakes. Romans confidently predicted the upset, with Keen Ice winning at 16–1 odds. "That was a special day," Romans said. "What was so reassuring and made me feel so good was that they cheered us all the way back. It was very sporting of them to appreciate a big effort from a horse, whether it's American Pharoah or not. I never expected that."

== Politics ==
Romans announced a campaign for the United States Senate in his native Kentucky on November 12, 2025. The seat is held by former Senate majority leader Mitch McConnell, who is retiring. Kentucky has not elected a Democrat to the Senate since Wendell Ford was re-elected in 1992. Romans' campaign was endorsed by James Carville. He lost the nomination to Charles Booker.
