= Arlington Million =

American Thoroughbred horse race

- Class: Grade 1
- Location: Colonial Downs; New Kent County, Virginia
- Inaugurated: 1981 at Arlington Park
- Race type: Thoroughbred
- Website: Colonial Downs

Race information
- Distance: 1 1/4 miles
- Surface: Turf
- Track: Left-handed
- Qualification: 3-year-olds & Up, Thoroughbreds
- Weight: Weight for age
- Purse: $1,000,000

The Arlington Million is a Grade 1 flat horse race in the United States for thoroughbred horses aged three years and upward on turf. It was originally raced at Arlington Park in Arlington Heights, Illinois over a distance of 1 1/4 miles.

The Arlington Million is the first thoroughbred race to offer a purse of US$1,000,000. It is part of the Breeders' Cup Challenge series, and the winner automatically qualifies for the Breeders' Cup Turf.

Churchill Downs, whose parent company owned the land of the defunct Arlington Park racetrack, hosted the Arlington Million in 2022. The 2023 race was run at Churchill-owned Colonial Downs in Virginia.

== History ==
The Arlington Million was introduced in 1981 by Joe Joyce, the father of TVG's Mike Joyce and the president of Arlington Park at the time. The winner receives 60% of the million dollar purse and the Arlington Million Trophy. The race was graded after only its second running and was awarded a grade one status in 1983 based on the talent of the runners that raced in its first two years.

The horse John Henry won the race twice. On August 30, 1981, Willie Shoemaker became the first jockey to win a $1 million thoroughbred horse race when John Henry took the inaugural Arlington Million by a nose over The Bart. The track famously ran the Arlington Million in 1985 under the shadow of a burnt-out grandstand, after a fire had occurred there 25 days earlier. In 2007, Jambalaya became the first Canadian bred horse to win the Arlington Million, with his trainer, Catherine Day Phillips, being the first female trainer to ever win the race.

The race has been run under several different names: in 1981, it was called the Arlington Million Invitational Stakes; from 1982 through 1984 it was known as the Budweiser Million Stakes; from 1985 through 1987, it was the Budweiser-Arlington Million. In 1988, the race was held at Woodbine Racetrack in Toronto, Ontario to accommodate the completion of repairs after the 1985 fire, and there was no race held in 1998 or 1999 during a two-year shutdown of Arlington Park. In 2021, the final year of live racing at Arlington, the race was called the Mister D. Stakes (after Richard L. Duchossois) with a purse of $600,000.

The 2022 Arlington Million was run at Churchill Downs. The Louisville racetrack's parent company, Churchill Downs Incorporated (which owns the Arlington Park property), announced that it would relocate the race along with several of Arlington's traditional stakes races. A special one-day Arlington Million racing card was held at Churchill on August 13, 2022. The plans were made possible after Churchill reached an agreement with Ellis Park, which normally controls racing in Kentucky during the summer, along with the Kentucky Horse Racing Commission and Kentucky horsemen. The move was criticized by the president of a group representing Illinois horsemen. Illinois Thoroughbred Horsemen's Association president Chris Block suggested that the relocation of the Arlington Million and other races is another sign that the Arlington Park racetrack was closed for good, adding: "What I want to do now is take a horse down there and win the first Arlington Million at Churchill Downs." Because the Churchill Downs turf course is smaller than the one used at Arlington, the distance of the race was shortened from 1 1/4 miles to 1 1/8 miles.

In December 2022 an agreement was reached between Churchill Downs and the American Graded Stakes Committee to move the 2023 Arlington Million to Colonial Downs in Virginia. The move allowed the race to return to its original distance of 1 1/4 miles.

Several times throughout the race's history, it was nationally televised, usually through a simulcast aired on WGN-TV picked up by their superstation feed, NBCSN, and TVG throughout the years.

== Records ==
Time record:

At 1 1/4 miles

- 1:58.19 - Set Piece (2023)

Most wins:

- 2 - John Henry (1981, 1984)

Longest odds:

- 40.60 - Mill Native (1988)

Shortest odds:

- 0.50 - Bricks and Mortar (2019)

Most wins by an owner:

- 3 – Juddmonte Farms (2000, 2002, 2023)
- 3 – Godolphin Racing (2003, 2022, 2024)

Most wins by a jockey:

- 2 - Laffit Pincay, Jr. (1982, 1991)
- 2 - Cash Asmussen (1988, 1992)
- 2 - José A. Santos (1990, 1993)
- 2 - Gary Stevens (1990, 1997)
- 2 - Jerry D. Bailey (2000, 2002)
- 2 - Ramon A. Dominguez (2009, 2012)
- 2 - Irad Ortiz Jr. (2018, 2019)
- 2 - Florent Geroux (2015, 2023)

Most wins by a trainer:

- 4 - Chad C. Brown (2013, 2017, 2018, 2019)

Largest margin of victory:

- 5 lengths - Estrapade (1986)

Shortest margin of victory:

- Nose - John Henry (1981)

== Winners ==
Year	Winner	Age	Jockey	Trainer	Owner	Time	Distance	Track	Ref
2026	Burnham Square	4	Brian Hernandez Jr.	Ian Wilkes	Whitham Thoroughbreds, LLC	2:00.80	1 1/4 miles	Colonial	
2025	Fort Washington	6	Junior Alvarado	Claude R. McGaughey III	Magic Cap Stables	1:59.58	1 1/4 miles	Colonial	
2024	Nations Pride (IRE)	5	William Buick	Charlie Appleby	Godolphin	2:01.96	1 1/4 miles	Colonial	
2023	Set Piece (GB)	7	Florent Geroux	Brad H. Cox	Juddmonte Farms	1:58.19	1 1/4 miles	Colonial	
2022	Santin	4	Tyler Gaffalione	Brendan P. Walsh	Godolphin	1:46.88	1 1/8 miles	Churchill	
2021^{[1]}	Two Emmys	5	James Graham	Hugh Robertson	Wolfe Racing and Hugh Robertson	2:03.34	1 1/4 miles	Arlington	
2020	Not run due to the COVID-19 pandemic								
2019	Bricks and Mortar	4	Irad Ortiz Jr.	Chad C. Brown	Klaravich Stables & William H. Lawrence	1:59.44	1 1/4 miles	Arlington	
2018	Robert Bruce (CHI)	4	Irad Ortiz Jr.	Chad C. Brown	Convento Viejo LLC	2:02.29	1 1/4 miles	Arlington	
2017	Beach Patrol	4	Joel Rosario	Chad C. Brown	James Covello, Sheep Pond Partners & Head Of Plains Partners	2:02.39	1 1/4 miles	Arlington	
2016	Mondialiste	6	Daniel Tudhope	David O'Meara	Geoff and Sandra Turnbull	2:01.87	1 1/4 miles	Arlington	
2015	The Pizza Man	6	Florent Geroux	Roger A. Brueggemann	Midwest Thoroughbreds	2:02.20	1 1/4 miles	Arlington	
2014	Hardest Core	4	Eriluis Vaz	Edward Graham	Andrew Bentley Stables	2:01.51	1 1/4 miles	Arlington	
2013	Real Solution^{[2]}	4	Alan Garcia	Chad C. Brown	Kenneth L. Ramsey and Sarah K. Ramsey	2:00.99	1 1/4 miles	Arlington	
2012	Little Mike	5	Ramon Dominguez	Dale Romans	Priscilla Vaccarezza	2:02.44	1 1/4 miles	Arlington	
2011	Cape Blanco	4	Jamie Spencer	Aidan O'Brien	Derrick Smith, Sue Magnier, Michael Tabor & Mrs F Hay	2:05.39	1 1/4 miles	Arlington	
2010	Debussy	4	William Buick	John Gosden	Princess Haya of Jordan	2:03.01	1 1/4 miles	Arlington	
2009	Gio Ponti	4	Ramon Dominguez	Christophe Clement	Castleton Lyons	2:04.19	1 1/4 miles	Arlington	
2008	Spirit One	4	Ioritz Mendizabal	Philip Demercastel	Kamel Chehboub	2:02.17	1 1/4 miles	Arlington	
2007	Jambalaya	5	Robby Albarado	Catherine Day Phillips	Todd Phillips & Catherine Day Phillips	2:04.76	1 1/4 miles	Arlington	
2006	The Tin Man	8	Victor Espinoza	Richard Mandella	Ralph and Aury Todd	2:01.35	1 1/4 miles	Arlington	
2005	Powerscourt	5	Kieren Fallon	Aidan O'Brien	Sue Magnier	2:03.38	1 1/4 miles	Arlington	
2004	Kicken Kris^{[3]}	4	Kent Desormeaux	Michael R. Matz	Brushwood Stable	2:00.08	1 1/4 miles	Arlington	
2003	Sulamani^{[4]}	4	David R. Flores	Saeed bin Suroor	Godolphin	2:02.29	1 1/4 miles	Arlington	
2002	Beat Hollow	5	Jerry Bailey	Robert J. Frankel	Juddmonte Farms	2:02.94	1 1/4 miles	Arlington	
2001	Silvano	5	Andreas Suborics	Andreas Wöhler	Stiftung Gestüt Fährhof	2:02.64	1 1/4 miles	Arlington	
2000	Chester House	5	Jerry Bailey	Robert J. Frankel	Juddmonte Farms	2:01.37	1 1/4 miles	Arlington	
1998 - 1999	Race not held								
1997	Marlin	4	Gary Stevens	D. Wayne Lukas	Michael Tabor	2:02.54	1 1/4 miles	Arlington	
1996	Mecke	4	Robbie Davis	Emanuel Tortora	James Lewis Jr.	2:00.49	1 1/4 miles	Arlington	
1995	Awad	5	Eddie Maple	David G. Donk	Ryehill Farm	1:58.69	1 1/4 miles	Arlington	
1994	Paradise Creek	5	Pat Day	William I. Mott	Masayuki Nishiyama	1:59.78	1 1/4 miles	Arlington	
1993	Star of Cozzene	5	José A. Santos	Mark Hennig	Team Valor Stable	2:07.50	1 1/4 miles	Arlington	
1992	Dear Doctor	5	Cash Asmussen	John Hammond	Henri Chalhoub	1:59.84	1 1/4 miles	Arlington	
1991	Tight Spot	4	Laffit Pincay, Jr.	Ron McAnally	F. Anderson, V.J. Winchell & F. Whitman	1:59.55	1 1/4 miles	Arlington	
1990	Golden Pheasant	4	Gary Stevens	Charlie Whittingham	Summa Stable & Wayne Gretzky	1:59.60	1 1/4 miles	Arlington	
1989	Steinlen	6	José A. Santos	D. Wayne Lukas	Wildenstein Stable	2:03.60	1 1/4 miles	Arlington	
1988	Mill Native	4	Cash Asmussen	André Fabre	C. N. Ray	2:00.00	1 1/4 miles	Woodbine	
1987	Manila	4	Angel Cordero Jr.	LeRoy Jolley	Bradley M. Shannon	2:02.40	1 1/4 miles	Arlington	
1986	Estrapade^{[5]}	6	Fernando Toro	Charlie Whittingham	Allen E. Paulson	2:00.80	1 1/4 miles	Arlington	
1985	Teleprompter	5	Tony Ives	Bill Watts	Edward Stanley, 18th Earl of Derby	2:03.40	1 1/4 miles	Arlington	
1984	John Henry	9	Chris McCarron	Ron McAnally	Dotsam Stable	2:01.40	1 1/4 miles	Arlington	
1983	Tolomeo	3	Pat Eddery	Luca Cumani	Carlo d'Alessio	2:04.40	1 1/4 miles	Arlington	
1982	Perrault	5	Laffit Pincay, Jr.	Charlie Whittingham	Serge Fradkoff & Baron Thierry van Zuylen	1:58.80	1 1/4 miles	Arlington	
1981	John Henry	6	Willie Shoemaker	Ron McAnally	Dotsam Stable	2:07.60	1 1/4 miles	Arlington	

^{1} In 2021, the Arlington Million was known as the Mister D. Stakes.
^{2} The Apache finished first in 2013 but was demoted to second place following a Stewards' Inquiry.
^{3} Powerscourt finished first in 2004 but was demoted to fourth place following a Stewards' Inquiry.
^{4} Storming Home finished first in 2003 but was demoted to fourth place following a Stewards' Inquiry.
^{5} The only filly to win the race.

== Notes ==
- In 2015, The Pizza Man became the lone horse bred in Illinois to win the Million.
- No races were held at Arlington International Racecourse in 1998 or 1999, as the Illinois horse racing authorities did not authorise dates for the track.
- Starting in 1991, timing was arranged to hundredths.
- In 2004, Pat Gibson won a million pounds on the UK version of Who Wants to Be a Millionaire? by correctly answering the Million was not a Triple Crown race in the United States (which were the Kentucky Derby, the Preakness Stakes and the Belmont Stakes).
- Starting in 2007, the winner of this race will qualify for the Breeders Cup World Thoroughbred Championships in the Turf Division.
