= Colonial Downs =

Horse race track in New Kent County, Virginia

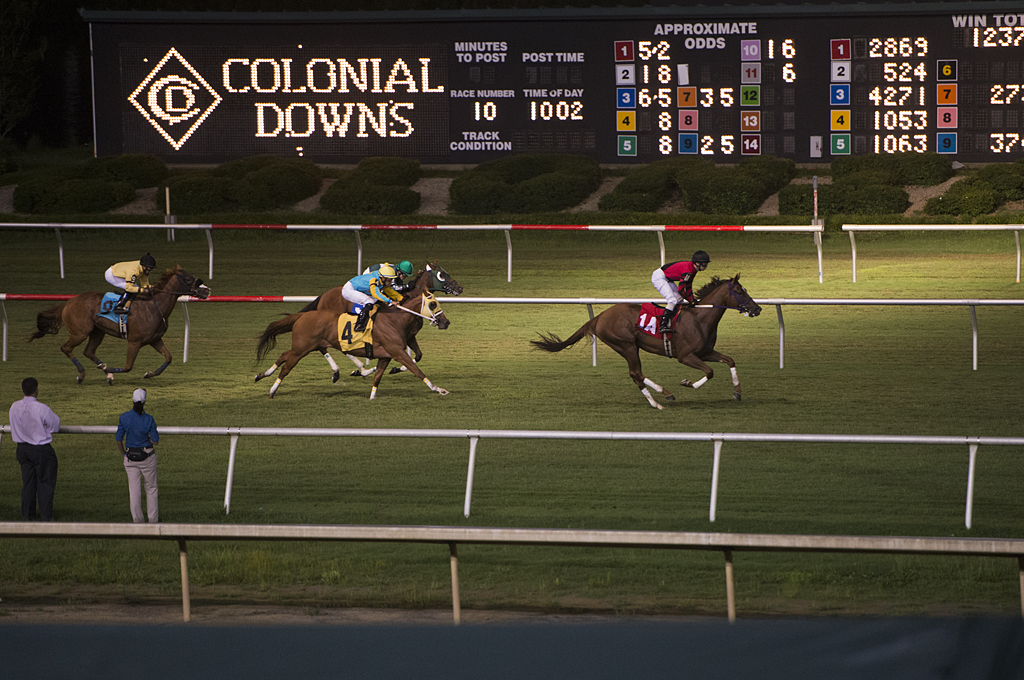
- Colonial Downs in 2012
- Interactive map of Colonial Downs
- Location: New Kent County, Virginia, U.S.
- Coordinates: 37°29′9.76″N 77°0′20.41″W
- Owned by: Churchill Downs, Inc.
- Date opened: Initial: 1997–2013; Reestablished: 2019–
- Race type: Thoroughbred
- Course type: Flat racing
- Notable races: Grade III Virginia Derby, Grade I Arlington Million, Grade I Beverly D. Stakes

Colonial Downs is a racetrack located in New Kent County, Virginia adjacent to Interstate 64, halfway between Richmond and Williamsburg. The track conducted Thoroughbred flat racing and Standardbred harness racing between 1997 and 2014, and reopened for thoroughbreds in 2019. It is owned and operated by Churchill Downs, Inc.

== History and information ==
The track opened on September 1, 1997. More than 13,000 attended the track on opening day. The track used several unconventional construction and business approaches. They constructed one of the largest tracks in size in the country but built a relatively small clubhouse. They also built OTBs prior to the opening of the track. The track also struck a deal with Maryland to stop Maryland racing during the Colonial Downs thoroughbred meet, although this later ended. The tract of land on which the track is built was obtained through an eminent domain suit brought by the State of Virginia against an African American/Native American family (Tero Johnson) that had owned the majority of the land since 1863.

Until 2005, the track was managed by the Maryland Jockey Club under a complicated agreement with Virginia and Maryland regulators and the Maryland-Virginia Racing Circuit. The track was fairly successful and offered good summertime turf racing in the traditionally poor three-year-old turf division. The track ran two legs of the annual Jacobs Investments Grand Slam of Grass. This event consisted of the Colonial Turf Cup and the Virginia Derby from Colonial Downs, the Secretariat Stakes from Arlington Park and the Breeders' Cup Turf.

The track requested 25 thoroughbred dates in 2009, down from 45 in 2008. After negotiations with the track's horsemen and the Commonwealth of Virginia, the track ran 40 thoroughbred dates. The schedule originally ran from June 12 to August 4, 2009, but was later moved up one week. This allowed the track to run live racing on Belmont Stakes day, June 6. The fall harness meet ran 36 dates, from September 8 through November 7. The harness meet was timed to end on Breeders' Cup weekend.

Colonial Downs stopped scheduling thoroughbred racing from 2013, due to a dispute between track management and horsemen's groups. Harness racing ended the following year, and all track-affiliated betting sites were closed in April 2015. The track filed a lawsuit in the United States District Court for the Eastern District of Virginia, seeking clarity in recently amended state horse racing laws, but the case was dismissed in the District Court on November 24, 2015.

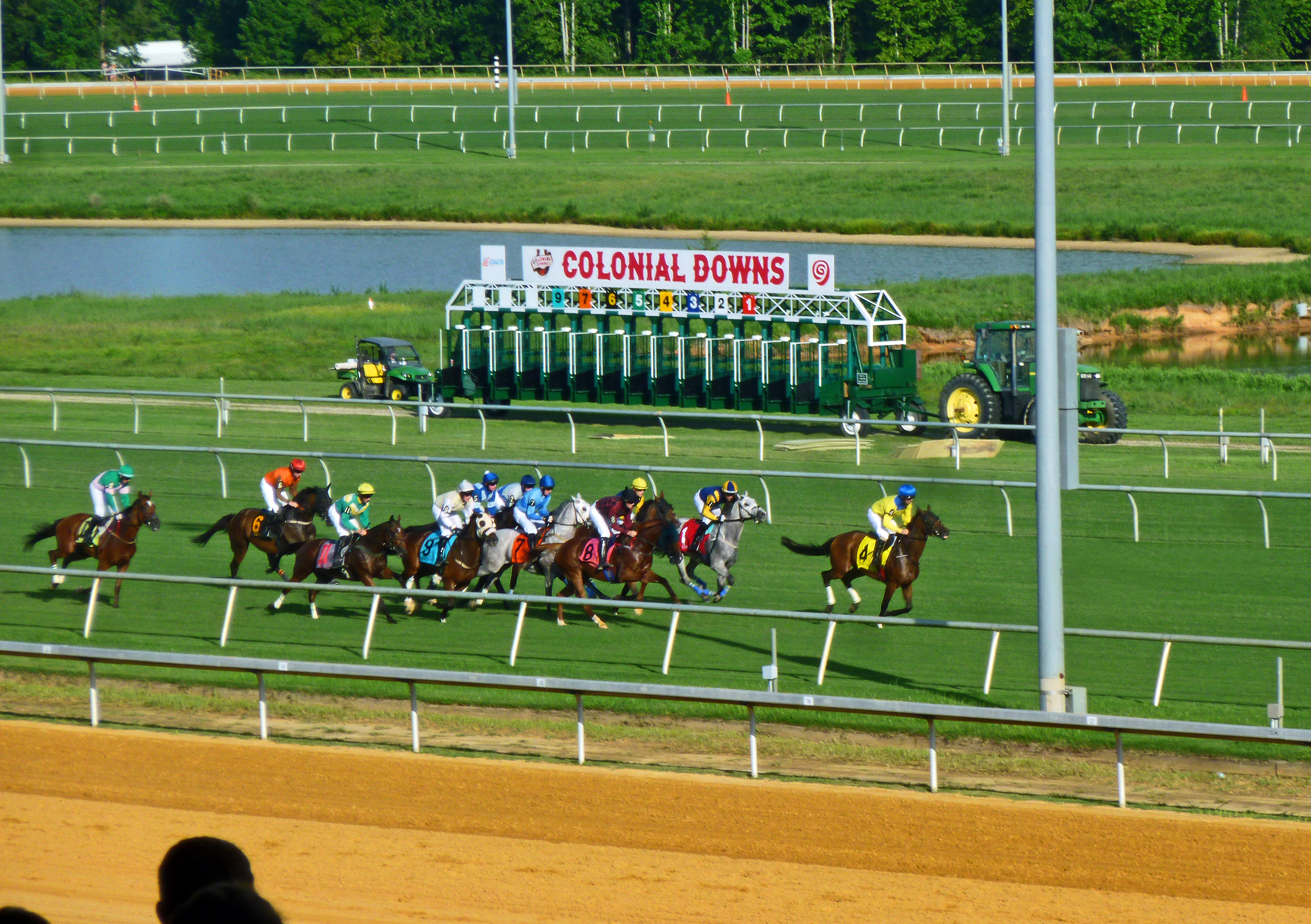
A race on the Secretariat turf course after racing was resumed at Colonial Downs in New Kent County, Virginia. August 10, 2019.

In November 2015, Colonial Downs was denied 2016 racing dates by the Virginia Racing Commission. In rendering their decision, commissioners stated that Colonial Downs "displayed callous disregard for the industry" when it surrendered its unlimited racing license in 2014. A spokesman for Jacobs Entertainment, Inc. said that all options to keep the track open have been exhausted.

In April 2018, Virginia enacted a law to allow historical racing machines (similar to slot machines) at the track and at off-track betting parlors, in an effort to make it economically viable to reopen the track. Weeks later, the track was purchased by Revolutionary Racing (later named Colonial Downs Group), a Chicago-based partnership that included gaming executives and Peninsula Pacific Entertainment, for a price of over $20 million. Peninsula Pacific later bought out the other investors, taking full ownership of Colonial Downs. The track held its first race since 2013 on August 8, 2019.

In 2022, Peninsula Pacific sold the bulk of its assets, including Colonial Downs, to Churchill Downs, Inc.

== Physical attributes ==
The track has a 10-furlong (6,600 ft; 2,000 m) dirt oval, a 7 1/2-furlong (5,000 ft; 1,500 m) inner turf oval and a 9-furlong (5,900 ft; 1,800 m) outer turf oval.

== Racing ==
The track featured an autumn harness racing meet. Colonial Downs was the only 10-furlong (6,600 ft; 2,000 m) track in North America with harness racing and features a one-turn mile. The horses start from a chute on the backstretch. Harness racing times at Colonial Downs were the fastest in racing. On October 11, 2008, the world trotting record was set during the $100,000 Patriot Invitational. It was set by Enough Talk. The trotter became the first in harness racing history to break the 1:50 barrier with 1:49.3.

=== Graded events ===
The following Graded events are held at Colonial Downs

Grade I

- Arlington Million

Grade II

- Beverly D. Stakes
- Secretariat Stakes

Grade III

- Old Dominion Derby

=== Road to the Kentucky Derby prep race ===
- Virginia Derby

=== Former graded events ===
The following graded stakes were formerly run at Colonial Downs:

- Grade II Colonial Turf Cup (since 2015, run at Laurel Park now as Baltimore Washington International Turf Cup)
- Grade III All Along Stakes (since 2015, run at Laurel Park)
- Grade III Virginia Oaks (now listed stakes run at Colonial Downs)
