= Virginia Derby =

- Class: Stakes
- Location: Colonial Downs; New Kent County, Virginia
- Inaugurated: 1998
- Race type: Thoroughbred - Flat racing
- Website: Colonial Downs

Race information
- Distance: 1 1/8 miles (9 furlongs)
- Surface: Dirt
- Track: Left-handed
- Qualification: Three-year-olds
- Weight: 123 lbs with allowances
- Purse: $500,000 (2025)

The Virginia Derby is an American ungraded Thoroughbred horse race for three-year-olds over a distance of one and one-eighth miles on the dirt held annually in March at Colonial Downs in New Kent County, Virginia. The event currently carries a purse of $500,000.

== History ==
The inaugural running of the event took place on March 15, 2025, as a Road to the Kentucky Derby prep race and was won American Promise who was trained by the US Hall of Fame trainer D. Wayne Lukas and ridden by jockey Nik Juarez by 7 3/4 lengths in a track record time of 1:46.41.

In 2024, Churchill Downs Inc., owners of Colonial Downs announced that the turf event known as the Virginia Derby that was held late in the summer would be moved to the early spring and would transition to the dirt track. The event would be part of a new four-day spring meet at Colonial Downs.

== Winners ==
Year	Winner	Jockey	Trainer	Owner	Distance	Time	Purse	Grade	Ref
Virginia Derby
2026	Incredibolt	Jaime Torres	Riley Mott	Pin Oak Stud	1 1/8 miles	1:47.76	$506,000		
2025	American Promise	Nik Juarez	D. Wayne Lukas	BC Stables	1 1/8 miles	1:46.41	$529,900		

== See also ==
Road to the Kentucky Derby
