= Yoshida (horse) =

Japanese-bred Thoroughbred racehorse (foaled 2014)

Yoshida ヨシダ
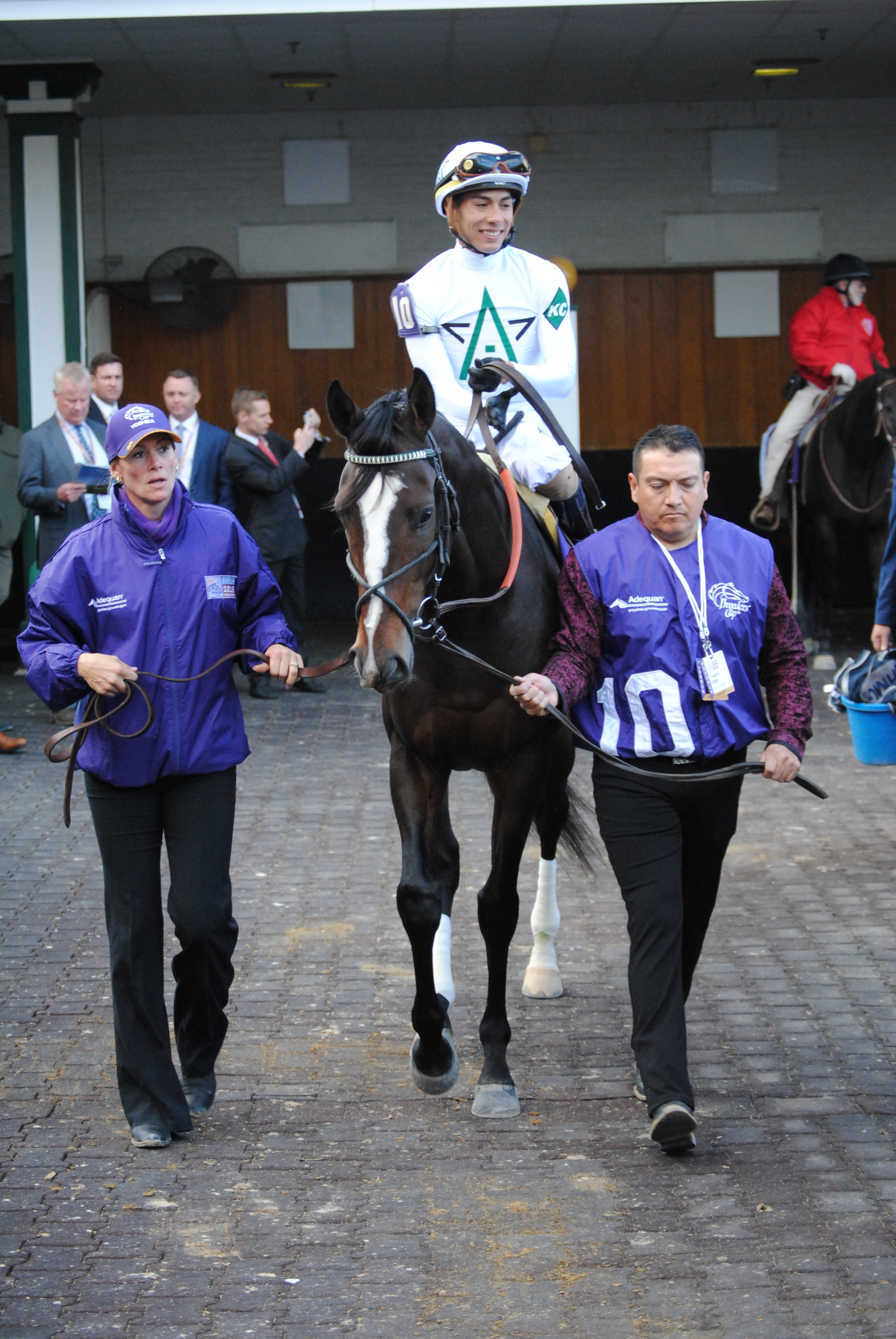
- Yoshida at the 2018 Breeders' Cup Classic
- Breed: Thoroughbred
- Sire: Heart's Cry
- Grandsire: Sunday Silence
- Dam: Hilda's Passion
- Damsire: Canadian Frontier
- Sex: Stallion
- Foaled: February 24, 2014
- Country: Japan
- Colour: Bay
- Breeder: Northern Farm
- Owner: China Horse Club, WinStar Farm, Head of Plains Partners et al
- Racing colours
- Trainer: William I. Mott
- Jockey: Joel Rosario; José Ortiz
- Record: 18: 5-4-1
- Earnings: US$2,505,770

Major wins
- Woodward Stakes (2018); Turf Classic Stakes (2018); Hill Prince Stakes (2017)

Yoshida (Japanese: ヨシダ; foaled February 24 2014) is a Japanese-bred, American-trained retired Thoroughbred racehorse and active sire. He competed from 2016 to 2019, recording five wins in eighteen starts, including the Woodward Stakes (GI) and Turf Classic Stakes (GI) in 2018, and the Hill Prince Stakes (GIII) in 2017. He was the first Japanese-bred horse to win a Grade 1 race on dirt in the United States. His racing name is derived from the surname of Katsumi Yoshida, president of Northern Farm.

== Background ==
Yoshida is a bay horse bred in Abira, Hokkaido, by Northern Farm. He was sired by Heart's Cry, a son of Sunday Silence, and his dam was Hilda's Passion, an American-bred mare by Canadian Frontier. His dam Hilda's Passion won five graded stakes in North America, including the Ballerina Stakes (GI). His half-sister Sanctuaire (by Deep Impact) won the 2020 Shinzan Kinen (GIII).

Hilda's Passion was purchased for US$1,225,000 by Katsumi Yoshida at the 2011 Fasig-Tipton Kentucky Mixed Sale and imported to Japan as a broodmare. Yoshida was her second foal, born on February 24, 2014. At the 2015 Select Sale yearling session, he was purchased for ¥94,000,000 (the highest price for a Heart's Cry yearling that year) by John McCormack Bloodstock, acting as agent for WinStar Farm, and was exported to the United States for training. He was sent into training with William I. Mott.

== Racing career ==
=== 2016: Two-year-old season ===
Yoshida debuted on November 19, 2016, in a maiden special weight race on the turf at Aqueduct Racetrack, finishing second in a field of ten.

=== 2017: Three-year-old season ===
Yoshida won a maiden special weight race at Keeneland Racecourse on April 9, 2017. He won the James W. Murphy Stakes (Listed) at Pimlico Race Course on May 20 by four lengths. He finished fifth in the Belmont Derby Invitational Stakes (GI) at Belmont Park in July, second in the National Museum of Racing Hall of Fame Stakes (GII) at Saratoga Race Course in August, and second in the Saranac Stakes (GIII) at Saratoga in September.

On October 7, he won the Hill Prince Stakes (GIII) at Belmont Park, ridden by José Ortiz, defeating Lucullan by a neck in a time of 1:47.07 for nine furlongs on firm turf.

=== 2018: Four-year-old season ===
On May 5, Yoshida won the Turf Classic Stakes (GI) at Churchill Downs, ridden by José Ortiz, covering nine furlongs on turf in 1:54.64. He defeated eight graded stakes winners, including three Grade 1 winners.

He finished fifth in the Queen Anne Stakes (GI) at Ascot Racecourse in England on June 19. He finished fifth in the Fourstardave Handicap (GI) at Saratoga in August.

On September 1, Yoshida contested the Woodward Stakes (GI) at Saratoga, his first career start on dirt. Ridden by Joel Rosario, he won by two lengths over Gunnevera in a time of 1:48.94, becoming the first Japanese-bred horse to win a Grade 1 race on dirt in the United States. He finished fourth in the Breeders' Cup Classic (GI) at Churchill Downs on November 3, beaten 2.25 lengths by Accelerate.

=== 2019: Five-year-old season and retirement ===
Yoshida finished sixth in the Pegasus World Cup Turf Invitational (GI) at Gulfstream Park in January and sixth in the Dubai World Cup (GI) at Meydan Racecourse in March. He finished sixth in the Stephen Foster Stakes (GII) at Churchill Downs in June. He finished second in the Whitney Stakes (GI) at Saratoga in August and third in the Woodward Stakes (GI) at Saratoga in August. He finished eighth in the Breeders' Cup Classic (GI) at Santa Anita Park on November 2, his final start.

== Statistics ==
The following table details all 18 starts of Yoshida's racing career based on Equibase and en.netkeiba records.

Date	Distance (Surface)	Race	Class	Course	Odds (Favourite)	Field	Finish	Time	Jockey	Winning (Losing) Margin	Winner (2nd Place)	Ref
2016 – two-year-old season
Nov 19	1 mile (Turf)	Maiden Special Weight	Maiden	Aqueduct	3.9 (5th)	10	2nd	1:40.90	José Ortiz	0.5	Coleman Rocky	
2017 – three-year-old season
Apr 9	1⅛ miles (Turf)	Maiden Special Weight	Maiden	Keeneland	0.6 (1st)	11	1st	1:49.36	José Ortiz	–1.25	(Im The Captain Now)	
May 20	1 mile (Turf)	James W. Murphy Stakes	Listed	Pimlico	1.3 (1st)	12	1st	1:36.83	Joel Rosario	–4.0	(Chubby Star)	
Jul 8	1¼ miles (Turf)	Belmont Derby Invitational Stakes	GI	Belmont Park	4.0 (1st)	11	5th	2:00.25	John Velazquez	2.25	Oscar Performance	
Aug 4	1 1/16 miles (Turf)	National Museum of Racing Hall of Fame Stakes	GII	Saratoga	3.0 (1st)	9	2nd	1:39.47	José Ortiz	0.5	Bricks and Mortar	
Sep 2	1⅛ miles (Turf)	Saranac Stakes	GIII	Saratoga	2.1 (1st)	8	2nd	1:46.18	Irad Ortiz Jr.	0.25	Voodoo Song	
Oct 7	1⅛ miles (Turf)	Hill Prince Stakes	GIII	Belmont Park	6.7 (3rd)	9	1st	1:47.07	José Ortiz	–0.25	(Lucullan)	
2018 – four-year-old season
May 5	1⅛ miles (Turf)	Turf Classic Stakes	GI	Churchill Downs	13.0 (6th)	9	1st	1:54.64	José Ortiz	–0.75	(Beach Patrol)	
Jun 19	1 mile (Turf)	Queen Anne Stakes	GI	Ascot	12.0 (5th)	15	5th	1:38.85	José Ortiz	2.75	Accidental Agent	
Aug 11	1 mile (Turf)	Fourstardave Handicap	GI	Saratoga	2.25 (1st)	6	5th	1:35.96	José Ortiz	2.75	Voodoo Song	
Sep 1	1⅛ miles (Dirt)	Woodward Stakes	GI	Saratoga	6.0 (3rd)	14	1st	1:48.94	Joel Rosario	–2.0	(Gunnevera)	
Nov 3	1¼ miles (Dirt)	Breeders' Cup Classic	GI	Churchill Downs	11.0 (7th)	14	4th	2:02.93	José Ortiz	2.25	Accelerate	
2019 – five-year-old season
Jan 26	1 3/16 miles (Turf, Yielding)	Pegasus World Cup Turf Invitational	GI	Gulfstream Park	3.5 (1st)	10	6th	1:54.59	José Ortiz	2.75	Bricks and Mortar	
Mar 30	1¼ miles (Dirt)	Dubai World Cup	GI	Meydan	9.8 (5th)	13	6th	2:03.87	José Ortiz	8.75	Thunder Snow	
Jun 15	1⅛ miles (Dirt)	Stephen Foster Stakes	GII	Churchill Downs	4.5 (4th)	12	6th	1:49.27	José Ortiz	6.75	Seeking the Soul	
Aug 3	1⅛ miles (Dirt)	Whitney Stakes	GI	Saratoga	7.6 (4th)	7	2nd	1:47.10	Joel Rosario	2.0	McKinzie	
Aug 31	1⅛ miles (Dirt)	Woodward Stakes	GI	Saratoga	2.1 (1st)	9	3rd	1:48.11	Joel Rosario	1.25	Preservationist	
Nov 2	1¼ miles (Dirt)	Breeders' Cup Classic	GI	Santa Anita Park	13.2 (4th)	11	8th	2:02.80	Mike E. Smith	15.75	Vino Rosso	

== Stud career ==
Following his retirement, Yoshida entered stud at WinStar Farm in Kentucky in 2020. His first crop of 148 foals was bred in his initial season. His first winners debuted in 2023.

In 2024, Yoshida was imported to Japan and stands at the Darley Japan Stallion Complex in Hidaka, Hokkaido. His first Japanese-bred winner came on March 2, 2024, when Dual Wilder won a maiden race at Nakayama Racecourse.

== Pedigree ==
Pedigree of Yoshida (JPN)
Sire Heart's Cry (JPN) 2001	Sunday Silence (USA); 1986	Halo	Hail to Reason
Sire Heart's Cry (JPN) 2001	Sunday Silence (USA); 1986	Halo	Cosmah
Sire Heart's Cry (JPN) 2001	Sunday Silence (USA); 1986	Wishing Well	Understanding
Sire Heart's Cry (JPN) 2001	Sunday Silence (USA); 1986	Wishing Well	Mountain Flower
Sire Heart's Cry (JPN) 2001	Irish Dance (JPN); 1990	Tony Bin	Kampala
Sire Heart's Cry (JPN) 2001	Irish Dance (JPN); 1990	Tony Bin	Severn Bridge
Sire Heart's Cry (JPN) 2001	Irish Dance (JPN); 1990	Buper Dance	Lyphard
Sire Heart's Cry (JPN) 2001	Irish Dance (JPN); 1990	Buper Dance	My Bupers
Dam Hilda's Passion (USA) 2007	Canadian Frontier (USA); 1999	Gone West	Mr. Prospector
Dam Hilda's Passion (USA) 2007	Canadian Frontier (USA); 1999	Gone West	Secrettame
Dam Hilda's Passion (USA) 2007	Canadian Frontier (USA); 1999	Borodislew	Seattle Slew
Dam Hilda's Passion (USA) 2007	Canadian Frontier (USA); 1999	Borodislew	Breath Taking
Dam Hilda's Passion (USA) 2007	Executricker (USA); 1998	El Prado	Sadler's Wells
Dam Hilda's Passion (USA) 2007	Executricker (USA); 1998	El Prado	Lady Capulet
Dam Hilda's Passion (USA) 2007	Executricker (USA); 1998	Trick Trick	Clever Trick
Dam Hilda's Passion (USA) 2007	Executricker (USA); 1998	Trick Trick	Full Virtue

- Yoshida is inbred 5 × 5 to Northern Dancer.
- His dam Hilda's Passion won the Ballerina Stakes (GI) and four other graded stakes in North America.
- His half-sister Sanctuaire (by Deep Impact) won the 2020 Shinzan Kinen (GIII).

== See also ==
- Thoroughbred racing in Japan
- Woodward Stakes
