= Program Trading =

British-bred thoroughbred racehorse

- Sire: Lope de Vega
- Grandsire: Shamardal
- Dam: Dreamlike
- Damsire: Oasis Dream
- Sex: Colt
- Foaled: April 22, 2020
- Country: Great Britain
- Colour: Bay
- Breeder: Fittocks Stud & Arrow Farm Stud
- Owner: Klaravich Stables
- Trainer: Chad C. Brown
- Record: 15: 7 - 3 - 1
- Earnings: US$2,057,250

Major wins
- Saratoga Derby (2023); Hollywood Derby (2023); Turf Classic Stakes (2024); United Nations Stakes (2026)
- Last updated on July 19, 2026

Program Trading (foaled April 22, 2020) is a multiple Grade 1 winning British-bred American-trained Thoroughbred racehorse. The horse as a three-year-old in 2023 the horse won the Grade 1 Saratoga Derby at Saratoga Racetrack and the Hollywood Derby at Del Mar Racetrack.

== Background ==
Program Trading is a bay ridgling who was bred by Fittocks Stud, located in Upend in Cambridgeshire and Arrow Farm and Stud. Bloodstock agent Mike Ryan bought both Program Trading and Domestic Spending at the 2021 Tattersalls October Yearling Sale where they were consigned him to sale and Ryan purchased him for 250,000 guineas (US$356,551]).

Program Trading is sired by Irish-bred Lope de Vega. Lope de Vega will stand for a 2024 stud fee of €125,000 at Ballylinch Stud in Ireland. Program Trading is the first stakes winner and one of two winners in three starters for the Oasis Dream mare Dreamlike. A winner once in six starts with three seconds, Dreamlike is a half sister to Group 2 Park Hill Stakes winner Silk Sari. Program Trading's third dam is Irish champion Gossamer, a full sister to 1994 Breeders' Cup Mile winner Barathea.

Program Trading is trained by Chad C. Brown and owned by Seth Klarman's Klaravich Stables.

== Statistics ==
Date	Distance	Race	Group Grade	Track	Odds	Field	Finish	Time	Winning (Losing) Margin	Jockey	Ref
2023 – Three-year-old season
14 May 2023	1 1/16 miles	Maiden Special Weight		Monmouth Park	3.00	10	1st	1:41.13	5 lengths	Samy Camacho	
25 Jun 2023	1 1/16 miles	Allowance Optional Claiming		Belmont Park	0.75*	7	1st	1:40.34	2 1/4 lengths	Flavien Prat	
5 Aug 2023	1 3/16 miles	Saratoga Derby	I	Saratoga	3.60	8	1st	1:56.63	head	Flavien Prat	
9 Sep 2023	1 1/8 miles	Virginia Derby	III	Colonial Downs	0.70*	9	2nd	1:46.41 (Note: The winner Integration, set a new track record for the 1 1/8-mile distance at Colonial Downs)	(1 1/4 lengths)	Flavien Prat	
2 Dec 2023	1 1/8 miles	Hollywood Derby	I	Del Mar	0.90*	7	1st	1:47.82	neck	Flavien Prat	
2024 – Four-year-old season
4 May 2024	1 1/8 miles	Turf Classic Stakes	I	Churchill Downs	4.09	10	1st	1:50.30	head	Flavien Prat	
8 Jun 2024	1 3/16 miles	Manhattan Stakes	I	Saratoga	2.75*	8	5th	1:51.94	(2 1/2 lengths)	Flavien Prat	
2025 – Five-year-old season
29 Aug 2025	1 3/16 miles	Bernard Baruch Stakes	Listed	Saratoga	0.50*	5	2nd	1:43.05	(neck)	Flavien Prat	
4 Oct 2025	1 miles	Coolmore Turf Mile Stakes	I	Keeneland	4.39	11	2nd	1:33.61	(neck)	Flavien Prat	
1 Nov 2025	1 miles	Breeders' Cup Mile	I	Del Mar	10.60	13	10th	1:36.37	( 1/2 lengths)	Flavien Prat	
2026 – Six-year-old season
24 Jan 2026	1 1/8 miles	Pegasus World Cup Turf Invitational	I	Gulfstream Park	1.30*	12	5th	1:47.04	(1 length)	Flavien Prat	
21 Mar 2026	1 1/8 miles	Muniz Memorial Classic Stakes	II	Fair Grounds	1.60	7	3rd	1:48.17	(1 3/4 lengths)	Flavien Prat	
2 May 2026	1 1/8 miles	Turf Classic Stakes	I	Churchill Downs	7.73	9	4th	1:45.96	(1 length)	Flavien Prat	
13 Jun 2026	1 1/8 miles	Monmouth Stakes	Listed	Monmouth	0.30*	6	1st	1:48.71	2 lengths	Flavien Prat	
18 Jul 2026	1 3/8 miles	United Nations Stakes	II	Monmouth	0.90*	7	1st	2:19.77	2 3/4 lengths	Flavien Prat	

Legend:
Turf
Notes:
An (*) asterisk after the odds means Program Trading was the post-time favourite.

== Pedigree ==
Pedigree of Program Trading (GB), bay colt, April 20, 2020
Sire Lope de Vega (IRE) (2007)	Shamardal (2002)	Giant's Causeway (1997)	Storm Cat (1983)
Sire Lope de Vega (IRE) (2007)	Shamardal (2002)	Giant's Causeway (1997)	Mariah's Storm (1991)
Sire Lope de Vega (IRE) (2007)	Shamardal (2002)	Helsinki (GB) (1993)	Machiavellian (1987)
Sire Lope de Vega (IRE) (2007)	Shamardal (2002)	Helsinki (GB) (1993)	Helen Street (GB) (1982)
Sire Lope de Vega (IRE) (2007)	Lady Vettori (GB) (1997)	Vettori (IRE) (1992)	Machiavellian (1987)
Sire Lope de Vega (IRE) (2007)	Lady Vettori (GB) (1997)	Vettori (IRE) (1992)	Air Distingue (1980)
Sire Lope de Vega (IRE) (2007)	Lady Vettori (GB) (1997)	Lady Golconda (FR) (1992)	Kendor (FR) (1986)
Sire Lope de Vega (IRE) (2007)	Lady Vettori (GB) (1997)	Lady Golconda (FR) (1992)	Lady Sharp (FR) (1981)
Dam Dreamlike (GB) (2012)	Oasis Dream (GB) (2000)	Green Desert (1983)	Danzig (1977)
Dam Dreamlike (GB) (2012)	Oasis Dream (GB) (2000)	Green Desert (1983)	Foreign Courier (1979)
Dam Dreamlike (GB) (2012)	Oasis Dream (GB) (2000)	Hope (IRE) (1991)	Dancing Brave (1983)
Dam Dreamlike (GB) (2012)	Oasis Dream (GB) (2000)	Hope (IRE) (1991)	Bahamian (IRE) (1985)
Dam Dreamlike (GB) (2012)	So Silk GB) (2004)	Rainbow Quest (1981)	Blushing Groom (FR) (1974)
Dam Dreamlike (GB) (2012)	So Silk GB) (2004)	Rainbow Quest (1981)	I Will Follow (1975)
Dam Dreamlike (GB) (2012)	So Silk GB) (2004)	Gossamer (GB) (1999)	Sadlers Wells (1981)
Dam Dreamlike (GB) (2012)	So Silk GB) (2004)	Gossamer (GB) (1999)	Brocade (1981) (family: 14-a)

- Through his sire, Product Trading was inbred 4s × 4s to Machiavellian, meaning that this stallion appears twice in the fourth generation of his pedigree.
