= Gulfstream Park Turf Handicap top three finishers =

This is a listing of the horses that finished in either first, second, or third place and the number of starters in the Gulfstream Park Turf Handicap, an American Grade 1 race for horses four years old and older at 1-1/8 miles on the turf held at Gulfstream Park in Hallandale Beach, Florida. (List 1986–present)

Year	Winner	Second	Third	Starters
2015	Mshawish	Slumber (GB)	War Correspondent	9
2014	Lochte	Imagining	Amiras Prince	
2013	Point of Entry	Animal Kingdom	Unbridled Command	6
2012	Get Stormy	Hollinger	Big Blue Kitten	7
2011	Teaks North	Smart Bid	Get Stormy	8
2010	Court Vision **	Never on Sunday	Le Grand Cru	6
2009	Kip Deville	Just As Well	Court Vision	11
2008	Einstein	Dancing Forever	Stream of Gold	10
2007	Jambalaya	Honey Ryder	Einstein	11
2006	Einstein	Go Deputy	Gun Salute	8
2005	Prince Arch	Gigli	Mustanfar	11
2004	Hard Buck	Balto Star	Kicken Kris	8
2003	Man from Wicklow	Just Listen	Sardaukar	10
2002	Cetewayo	Band Is Passing	Profit Option	12
2001	Subtle Power	Whata Brainstorm	Stokosky	9
2000	Royal Anthem	Thesaurus	Band Is Passing	7
1999	Yagli	Unite's Big Red	Wild Event	6
1998	Flag Down	Buck's Boy	Copy Editor	12
1997	Lassigny	Flag Down	Awad	11
1996	Celtic Arms	Broadway Flyer	Flag Down	11
1995	Misil	Myrmidon	Star of Manila	11
1994	Strolling Along	Conveyor	Awad	6
1993	Stagecraft	Social Retiree	Futurist	8
1992	Passagere du Soir	Colchis Island	Crystal Moment	14
1991	Shy Tom	Dr. Root	Runaway Raja	13
1990	Youmadeyourpoint	Blazing Bart	Iron Courage	10
1989	Equalize	Posen	Nisswa	11
1988	Salem Drive	Equalize	Kings River	14
1987	Bolshoi Boy	Little Bold John	Artic Honeymoon	5
1986	Sondrio	Chief Run Run	Ends Well	10

** Take the points won the 2010 Gulfstream Park Turf Handicap but was disqualified and placed fifth.
