= Bricks and Mortar =

American thoroughbred racehorse

- Breed: Thoroughbred
- Sire: Giant's Causeway
- Grandsire: Storm Cat
- Dam: Beyond the Waves
- Damsire: Ocean Crest
- Sex: Stallion
- Foaled: March 2, 2014
- Country: USA
- Color: Dark bay
- Breeder: George W. Strawbridge Jr.
- Owner: Klaravich Stables & William H. Lawrence
- Trainer: Chad C. Brown
- Jockey: Irad Ortiz Jr.
- Record: 13: 11-0-2
- Earnings: $7,085,650

Major wins
- National Museum of Racing Hall of Fame Stakes (2017); Pegasus World Cup Turf (2019); Muniz Memorial Handicap (2019); Turf Classic Stakes (2019); Manhattan Handicap (2019); Arlington Million (2019) Breeders' Cup wins: Breeders' Cup Turf (2019)

Awards
- American Champion Male Turf Horse (2019); American Horse of the Year (2019)

Honors
- Secretariat Vox Populi Award (2019)

Bricks and Mortar (foaled March 2, 2014) is an American Thoroughbred racehorse who was named the American Horse of the Year in 2019. After winning four of six starts at age three, he missed most of his four-year-old campaign due to illness. At age five however, he established himself as the top-ranked turf horse in North America with wins in the Pegasus World Cup Turf, Muniz Memorial Handicap, Turf Classic Stakes, Manhattan Handicap and Arlington Million. He then won the Breeders' Cup Turf to complete a perfect year.

== Background ==
Bricks and Mortar is a dark bay horse who was bred in Kentucky by George Strawbridge, Jr. His sire Giant's Causeway was known in Europe as "The Iron Horse" after earning five consecutive Group One victories in a time span of just eleven weeks. Giant's Causeway then became a three-time leading sire in North America, whose notable offspring include Footstepsinthesand, Shamardal and Take Charge Brandi. The offspring of Giant's Causeway have been successful on both turf and dirt.

Bricks and Mortar's dam, Beyond the Waves, won the Prix des Tourelles and was group-stakes placed. "Beyond the Waves wasn't brilliant but was really good," said Strawbridge. "She was known for trying very hard; hence you have Bricks and Mortar trying very hard, and he is a really tough horse." Bricks and Mortars is the third stakes winner that she has produced.

Bricks and Mortar was sold for $200,000 at the 2015 Keeneland September Sales to Klaravich Stables, owned by Seth Klarman, and William H. Lawrence. He was trained by Chad Brown.

== Racing career ==
Bricks and Mortar did not race at age two. He made his first start on February 18, 2017, at Gulfstream Park over a distance of 1 1/16 miles on the turf. He raced in mid-pack for the first six furlongs, shifted to the outside as they turned into the stretch, and closed steadily to win by 1 3/4 lengths. In his next start, an allowance race on June 9 at Belmont Park, he ran the final quarter mile in under 22 seconds to win by three-quarters of a length. He then won the Manila Stakes on July 4, closing from last place with a quarter of a mile remaining to win by a neck.

On August 4, he made his graded stakes debut in the National Museum of Racing Hall of Fame Stakes at Saratoga. The favorite was Yoshida, who would subsequently win Grade I races on both turf and dirt. Bricks and Mortar rated just off the pace but ran into traffic problems in the stretch. His jockey shifted him away from the rail until they finally found running room, at which point Bricks and Mortar accelerated rapidly to win by three-quarters of a length. "With this horse," said Brown, "if you set him down in the clear and give him a target, he gets there... He's done everything we've asked."

Bricks and Mortar was narrowly defeated in both of his next two starts, the Saranac to Voodoo Song and Hill Prince Stakes to Yoshida. After the latter race, he was diagnosed with stringhalt, a neuro-muscular condition that affected his right hind leg. The condition became so severe that the horse was unable to gallop. He was operated on by veterinarian Larry Bramlage and took over a year to return to the racecourse. "This is probably one of [Bramlage's] best pieces of work," said Brown. "This horse took a long time and he then had some other issues, some bone remodeling. We tried him back and he needed some more time. When he finally made it back he was better than ever."

Because of the illness and recovery, Bricks and Mortar made only one start at age four, in an allowance optional claiming race at Gulfstream Park on December 22. He rated behind a fast early pace then made a "relentless rally" in the stretch to win by half a length.

=== 2019: five-year-old campaign ===
Bricks and Mortar began his five-year-old campaign on January 26, 2019, in the inaugural running of the Pegasus World Cup Turf. The race was developed as an evolution of the Pegasus World Cup, whose purse of $16 million in 2018 was split to cover two races – the Pegasus World Cup (on the dirt) was run in 2019 with a purse of $9 million, while the Pegasus World Cup Turf had a purse of $7 million. Yoshida was the favorite, with two Grade I wins in 2018: the Turf Classic and Woodward Stakes. The field also included multiple stakes winner Channel Maker (Bowling Green, Joe Hirsch Turf Classic), Aerolithe (NHK Mile Cup, Mainichi Okan) and Catapult (Eddie Read, Del Mar Handicap). The surface was yielding and the distance of 1 3/16 miles was the longest Bricks and Mortar had yet run. He again rated in mid-pack behind a fast early pace before starting to make up ground on the final turn. He swung wide and "blew by" the early leaders to win by 2 1/2 lengths. "I got a perfect trip," said jockey Irad Ortiz, Jr. "My horse put me in a good position and just held it together, saving ground. When I got... him out, he exploded."

On March 23, he was entered in the Muniz Memorial Handicap over a distance of 1 1/8 miles at Fair Grounds Race Course. He broke well and settled in second place, being carried three wide around the first turn. Longshot Markitoff sent a slow early pace, completing the first six furlongs in 1:15.28. At the head of the stretch, Bricks and Mortar took the lead by a head, but Markitoff battled back. The two horses dueled down the stretch with Bricks and Mortar prevailing by a nose in a photo finish.

Bricks and Mortar made his next start in the Turf Classic Stakes on May 4 at Churchill Downs, part of the undercard for the Kentucky Derby. The course was labeled good even though rain was falling. Drawing post position 12 in a field of 13, Bricks and Mortar was carried wide around the first turn while racing in ninth place. Markitoff again set a slow pace but gave way at the head of the stretch and finished sixth. Bricks and Mortar began his rally at the head of the stretch and closed steadily despite being bumped with an eighth of a mile remaining. He won by half a length over Qurbaan. "He had a tough post and the conditions were tough," said Brown. "And he's carrying top weight and he found a way to get there again. He's just a remarkable talent, this horse."

On June 8, Bricks and Mortar entered the Manhattan Handicap at Belmont Park. He settled in mid-pack, moving two-wide around the first turn. Down the backstretch, he trailed by 7 1/2 lengths but started to make up ground on the final turn. Swinging wide at the head of the stretch, he accelerated and drew off to win by 1 1/2 lengths. His time for 1 1/4 miles was an excellent 1:58.11 over a firm turf course.

In the June 2019 version of the World's Best Racehorse Rankings, Bricks and Mortar was rated at 120 pounds, just one pound behind dirt-runner McKinzie as the top-ranked horse in America. In the National Thoroughbred Racing Association (NTRA) poll, he was ranked first.

In August, it was announced that Teruya Yoshida's Shadai Farm had purchased the breeding rights to Bricks and Mortar. Having recently lost leading sire Deep Impact, Yoshida said, "We are very anxious to have [Bricks and Mortar] in Japan."

On August 10, he entered the Arlington Million as the 1-2 favorite in a field of nine. He raced in sixth place behind the early pace set by Bandua until they entered the stretch. Facing a wall of horses, Ortiz waited for racing room, then urged the horse through a hole. Bricks and Mortar responded with a powerful finishing drive to win by three-quarters of a length. The win moved Bricks and Mortar into contention for the Horse of the Year title. "I think there's a chance," said Klarman. "I don't want to get ahead of myself. I do think this helps the turf division as a whole, though. I hope so."

The win earned Bricks and Mortar an automatic berth in the Breeders' Cup Turf on November 2 at Santa Anita Park. Brown was initially uncertain about entering the race though, since the horse had had a demanding campaign and needed a layoff. Also, Bricks and Mortar had never run at the distance of 1 1/2 miles, a distance at which European challengers typically have an advantage. Brown contemplated entering the horse in the Mile, but was worried the horse would lack the explosive kick normally required at that distance after back-to-back races at 10 furlongs. Brown finally settled on entering Bricks and Mortar in the Turf, where his main rival was expected to be the European filly Magical. However, she was scratched shortly before the race. The field still included multiple Grade/Group One winners though, including Anthony Van Dyck (Epsom Derby), Old Persian, Arklow, and Channel Maker.

Bricks and Mortar went off as the even money favorite. The pace set by Acclimate was slow, which made Bricks and Mortar somewhat hard to settle. He was seventh with just a quarter of a mile to race, but found racing room in the stretch and was able to win by a neck in the final strides. "Today, he was a little keen with me," said Ortiz. "So I just tried to get him to relax. When I asked him to run, I looked behind me and saw we were clear. He saw that other horse in front of us, and he fought all the way to the wire."

In December, Bricks and Mortar was named the winner of the 2019 Secretariat Vox Populi Award, voted on by racing fans to recognize "the horse whose popularity and racing excellence best resounded with the general public." Kate Chenery Tweedy, daughter of Secretariat's owner Penny Tweedy, commented that Bricks and Mortar's comeback from illness was "a favorite plot in American sports lore – the return of a champion."

In recognition of his perfect campaign, Bricks and Mortar was named the 2019 American Horse of the Year at the 49th annual Eclipse Awards, earning 204 of 241 votes. He was also the unanimous selection as Champion Male Turf Horse. Brown commented on the "huge, huge void" left in his stable after the horse's retirement. "Now that he's not here, you really appreciate his heart, determination, consistency, his will to win, and dependability," he said. "You can go through thousands of horses to find one like him. When they are not there, you understand how special they are." It was the first time since John Henry in 1981 that a horse had won Horse of the Year honors with all of the horse's connections – owners Seth Klarman and William Lawrence, trainer Chad Brown, jockey Irad Ortiz Jr. and breeder George Strawbridge Jr. – also sweeping Eclipse Award wins in their respective categories.

== Stud career ==
Bricks and Mortar arrived safely in Japan for stud duty in December 2019, and stood his initial breeding season in 2020 for a fee of ¥6 million.

On June 3, 2023, Bricks and Mortar was represented by his first winner when Terra Merita won a 2-year-old newcomer race at Hanshin Racecourse under jockey Christophe Lemaire. He was also the first 2-year-old newcomer winner of the season.

On October 7, 2023, Bricks and Mortar had his first graded race winning crop with Gonbade Qabus, who won the Saudi Arabia Royal Cup held at Tokyo Racecourse under jockey Kohei Matsuyama.

=== Notable progeny ===
Below data is based on JBIS Stallion Reports.

c = colt, f = filly

bold = grade 1 stakes

**Foaled**	**Name**	**Sex**	**Major Wins**
2021	Gonbade Qabus	c	Saudi Arabia Royal Cup
2021	Aigle Noir	c	Hyogo Junior Grand Prix
2021	Ammothyella	f	Bluebird Cup, JBC Ladies' Classic (2024, 2025)
2022	Goltzschtal	c	Nikkei Shinshun Hai
2023	Diamond Knot	c	Keio Hai Nisai Stakes, Falcon Stakes, Swan Stakes

== Racing statistics ==
Date	Race	Racecourse	Grade	Distance	Finish	Margin	Time	Weight	Odds	Jockey	Ref
Feb 18, 2017	Maiden	Gulfstream Park		1 1/16 miles	1	1 3/4 lengths	1:43.04	120 lbs	6.00	Joel Rosario	
Jun 9, 2017	Allowance	Belmont Park		1 mile	1	3/4 length	1:34.64	122 lbs	2.65	Joel Rosario	
Jul 4, 2017	Manila Stakes	Belmont Park		1 mile	1	neck	1:33.12	118 lbs	3.30	Joel Rosario	
Aug 4, 2017	National Museum of Racing Hall of Fame Stakes	Saratoga Race Course	||	1 1/16 miles	1	3/4 length	1:39.47	121 lbs	4.10	Joel Rosario	
Sep 2, 2017	Saranac Stakes	Saratoga Race Course	|||	1 1/8 miles	3	( 3/4 length)	1:46.18	123 lbs	2.00*	Joel Rosario	
Oct 7, 2017	Hill Prince Stakes	Belmont Park	|||	1 1/8 miles	3	( 3/4 length)	1:47.07	120 lbs	1.50*	Joel Rosario	
Dec 22, 2018	Allowance	Gulfstream Park		1 mile	1	1/2 length	1:34.33	121 lbs	1.80*	Irad Ortiz Jr.	
Jan 26, 2019	Pegasus World Cup Turf Invitational	Gulfstream Park	|	1 3/16 miles	1	2 1/2 lengths	1:54.59	124 lbs	2.80	Irad Ortiz Jr.	
Mar 23, 2019	Muniz Memorial Handicap	Fair Grounds Race Course	||	1 1/8 miles	1	nose	1:50.44	125 lbs	0.30*	Irad Ortiz Jr.	
May 4, 2019	Turf Classic Stakes	Churchill Downs	|	1 1/8 miles	1	1/2 length	1:51.80	124 lbs	1.10*	Irad Ortiz Jr.	
Jun 8, 2019	Manhattan Stakes	Belmont Park	|	1 1/4 miles	1	1 1/2 lengths	1:58.11	124 lbs	0.65*	Irad Ortiz Jr.	
Aug 10, 2019	Arlington Million Stakes	Arlington Park	|	1 1/4 miles	1	3/4 length	1:59.44	126 lbs	0.50*	Irad Ortiz Jr.	
Nov 2, 2019	Breeders' Cup Turf	Santa Anita Park	|	1 1/2 miles	1	head	2:24.73	126 lbs	1.00*	Irad Ortiz Jr.	

== Pedigree ==
Pedigree of Bricks and Mortar (USA), bay horse, foaled March 2, 2014
Sire Giant's Causeway (USA) 1997	Storm Cat (USA); 1983	Storm Bird	Northern Dancer
Sire Giant's Causeway (USA) 1997	Storm Cat (USA); 1983	Storm Bird	South Ocean
Sire Giant's Causeway (USA) 1997	Storm Cat (USA); 1983	Terlingua	Secretariat
Sire Giant's Causeway (USA) 1997	Storm Cat (USA); 1983	Terlingua	Crimson Saint
Sire Giant's Causeway (USA) 1997	Mariah's Storm (USA); 1991	Rahy	Blushing Groom
Sire Giant's Causeway (USA) 1997	Mariah's Storm (USA); 1991	Rahy	Glorious Song
Sire Giant's Causeway (USA) 1997	Mariah's Storm (USA); 1991	Immense	Roberto
Sire Giant's Causeway (USA) 1997	Mariah's Storm (USA); 1991	Immense	Imsodear
Dam Beyond the Waves (USA) 1997	Ocean Crest (USA); 1991	Storm Bird	Northern Dancer
Dam Beyond the Waves (USA) 1997	Ocean Crest (USA); 1991	Storm Bird	South Ocean
Dam Beyond the Waves (USA) 1997	Ocean Crest (USA); 1991	S S Aroma	Seattle Slew
Dam Beyond the Waves (USA) 1997	Ocean Crest (USA); 1991	S S Aroma	Rare Bouquet
Dam Beyond the Waves (USA) 1997	Excedent (USA); 1985	Exceller	Vaguely Noble
Dam Beyond the Waves (USA) 1997	Excedent (USA); 1985	Exceller	Too Bald
Dam Beyond the Waves (USA) 1997	Excedent (USA); 1985	Broadway Lullaby	Stage Door Johnny
Dam Beyond the Waves (USA) 1997	Excedent (USA); 1985	Broadway Lullaby	Little Blessing (family 21-a)

Bricks and Mortar is inbred 3 × 3 to Storm Bird, meaning that stallion appears twice in the third generation of his pedigree.
