= Helen Pitts (horse trainer) =

American horse trainer (born 1974)

Personal information
- Born: May 23, 1974 (age 52) Monkton, Maryland, United States
- Occupation: Horse trainer

Horse racing career
- Sport: Horse racing
- Career wins: 224+ (ongoing)

Major racing wins
- Golden Rod Stakes (2005); Martha Washington Stakes (2005); Queen Elizabeth II Challenge Cup Stakes (2005); Raven Run Stakes (2006); Mervin H. Muniz Jr. Memorial Handicap (2007); La Troienne Stakes (2007); Gulfstream Park Turf Handicap (2006, 2008); Turf Classic Stakes (2008, 2009); Clark Handicap (2008); Santa Anita Handicap (2009)

Significant horses
- Leah's Secret, Curlin, Einstein

Helen Pitts (born May 23, 1974) is an American trainer of Thoroughbred racehorses.

== Early life ==
Born on a farm, Helen Pitts' parents were both involved in steeplechase racing. She rode ponies and horses from the time she was a young girl, competing in such things as steeplechase racing, pony racing, and fox hunting. She is a graduate of Oldfields School, an all-girls boarding and day school, which produces exceptional riders. She graduated with a degree in business from Villa Julie College.

== Training career ==
After finishing her education, Helen Pitts went to work for thoroughbred trainer Francis Campitelli where she stayed for several years before joining flat racing trainer, Kenneth McPeek. She eventually became McPeek's assistant-trainer and when he decided to leave the business for a time, she became head trainer on July 1, 2005. A resident of Louisville, Kentucky, she got her first win there three days later at Churchill Downs. In October, she won the Queen Elizabeth II Challenge Cup Stakes which was not just her first Grade I win, but marked the first-ever Grade I win by a female trainer at Keeneland Race Course.

== Achievements ==
Among Helen Pitts' other successes, she is the trainer of Einstein with whom she won the 2006 and 2008 Gulfstream Park Turf Handicap, the 2008 Turf Classic Stakes and then defeated Commentator in winning the Clark Handicap. Notably too, the two-time American Horse of the Year Curlin was conditioned for racing by Helen Pitts for owner, Midnight Cry Stable. Unraced at age two, Pitts got the colt through physical problems and in February 2007 she saddled the three-year-old for his first win at Gulfstream Park in Florida. Two hours after Curlin's impressive 12¾ length win, the colt was sold for $3.5 million to a racing partnership who turned him over to trainer, Steve Asmussen.

== Personal life ==
On September 5, 2008, Helen Pitts married Greg Blasi, whose brother Scott Blasi is Steve Asmussen's assistant trainer.
