= Hill Prince Stakes =

American Thoroughbred horse race

- Class: Grade III stakes
- Location: Aqueduct Racetrack; Queens, New York, United States
- Inaugurated: 1975 (at Belmont Park as Hill Prince Handicap)
- Race type: Thoroughbred – Flat racing
- Website: NYRA

Race information
- Distance: 1 1/8 miles (9 furlongs)
- Surface: Turf
- Track: Left-handed
- Qualification: Three-year-olds
- Weight: 124 lbs. with allowances
- Purse: $200,000 (2024)

The Hill Prince Stakes is a Grade III American Thoroughbred horse race for three-year-olds run over a distance of one and one-eight miles (9 furlongs) on the turf annually in November at Aqueduct Racetrack in Queens, New York. The event currently carries a purse of $200,000.

== History ==
The race is named for Christopher Chenery's Hall of Fame colt, Hill Prince.

The inaugural running took place as the Hill Prince Handicap on 26 October 1975 and was run at a distance of a mile and three-eights. It was won on a disqualification by Gustave Ring's homebred colt Don Jack.

The following year the event was scheduled in June at a distance of 1 1/16 miles.

The Hill Prince Stakes was hosted by Aqueduct Racetrack in Queens, New York in 1979, 1980, and again in 1982.

In 1981 was classified Grade III by the American Graded Stakes Committee.

The race was run in two divisions in 1982. The second division was won by Larida, the only filly to have won this event.

The event has been moved off the turf due to track conditions in 1998, 2003 and 2009 but has not had its classification downgraded.

Primarily the event had been scheduled in early spring but in 2014 NYRA moved the event to October and increased the stakes significantly to $500,000. In 2018 the event was upgraded to Grade II status.

The event was moved in the schedule to November in 2023 and is held at Aqueduct Racetrack.

In 2024 the American Graded Stakes Committee downgraded the event to Grade III status.

== Records ==
Speed record:

- 1 mile: 1:33.45 – Marcavelly (2007)
- 1 1/16 miles: 1:39.70 – Optic Nerve (1996)
- 1 1/8 miles: 1:45.96 – Subordination (1997)

Margins:

- 7 1/4 lengths – Street Game (2011)

Most wins by an owner:

- 4 – Klaravich Stables (1997, 2006, 2015, 2021)

Most wins by a jockey:

- 4 – Ángel Cordero Jr. (1978, 1981, 1988, 1991)
- 4 – Jerry Bailey (1983, 1992, 1994, 1995)

Most wins by a trainer:

- 4 – William I. Mott (1993, 1995, 2007, 2017)
- 4 – Christophe Clement (2008, 2012, 2018, 2024)

== Winners ==
Year	Winner	Jockey	Trainer	Owner	Distance	Time	Purse	Grade	Ref
At Belmont - Hill Prince Stakes
2026	Third Coast	Jose Lezcano	Thomas F. Proctor	Glen Hill Farm	1 3/16 miles	1:54.93	$200,000	III	
At Aqueduct
2025	Tiz Dashing	Javier Castellano	Barclay Tagg	Sackatoga Stable	1 1/8 miles	1:48.23	$200,000	III	
2024	Deterministic	Joel Rosario	Christophe Clement	St. Elias Stable, Ken Langone, Steven C. Duncker & Vicarage Stable	1 1/8 miles	1:46.58	$250,000	III	
2023	Integration	Kendrick Carmouche	Claude R. McGaughey III	West Point Thoroughbreds & Woodford Racing	1 1/8 miles	1:47.06	$250,000	II	
2022	Celestial City	Jose Lezcano	Claude R. McGaughey III	Stuart S. Janney III	1 1/8 miles	1:50.27	$300,000	II	
At Belmont Park
2021	Public Sector (GB)	Irad Ortiz Jr.	Chad C. Brown	Klaravich Stables	1 1/8 miles	1:48.68	$400,000	II	
2020	Get Smokin	Javier Castellano	Thomas M. Bush	Mary Abeel Sullivan Revocable Trust	1 mile	1:36.95	$150,000	II	
2019	Neptune's Storm	Ricardo Santana Jr.	Richard Baltas	John Rochfort, Saul Gevertz, Lynn Gitomer, Mike Goetz, Michael Nentwig, & Daniel Weiner	1 1/8 miles	1:49.74	$401,200	II	
2018	Have At It	David Cohen	Christophe Clement	Robert S. Evans	1 1/8 miles	1:50.52	$514,750	II	
2017	Yoshida (JPN)	Manuel Franco	William I. Mott	WinStar Farm, China Horse Club, SF Racing & Head of Plains Partners	1 1/8 miles	1:47.07	$500,000	III	
2016	Camelot Kitten	Irad Ortiz Jr.	Chad C. Brown	Ken and Sarah Ramsey	1 1/8 miles	1:47.25	$500,000	III	
2015	Takeover Target	Jose L. Ortiz	Chad C. Brown	Klaravich Stables & William H. Lawrence	1 1/8 miles	1:51.42	$500,000	III	
2014	Ring Weekend	Irad Ortiz Jr.	H. Graham Motion	St. Elias Stable & West Point Thoroughbreds	1 1/8 miles	1:55.56	$500,000	III	
2013	Notacatbutallama	John R. Velazquez	Todd A. Pletcher	Repole Stable	1 mile	1:34.82	$150,000	III	
2012	Summer Front	Ramon A. Dominguez	Christophe Clement	Waterford Stable	1 mile	1:33.74	$150,000	III	
2011	Street Game	Ryan Curatolo	Philip M. Serpe	Flying Zee Stables	1 mile	1:36.38	$100,000	III	
2010	Krypton	Rajiv Maragh	Kiaran P. McLaughlin	Harvey A. Clarke & Ron Winchell	1 mile	1:34.97	$98,000	III	
2009	Despite the Odds	Jeremy Rose	Michael J. Trombetta	Larry R. Johnson, TYB Stable & Gerry Dilger	1 mile	1:35.68	$109,000	III	Off turf
2008	Gio Ponti	Garrett K. Gomez	Christophe Clement	Castleton Lyons	1 mile	1:35.03	$111,000	III	
2007	Marcavelly	Edgar S. Prado	William I. Mott	Zayat Stables	1 mile	1:33.45	$105,700	III	
2006	Outperformance	Javier Castellano	Richard A. Violette Jr.	Klaravich Stables	1 mile	1:36.74	$115,400	III	
2005	Rey de Cafe	Javier Castellano	George R. Arnold II	G. Watts Humphrey Jr.	1 1/8 miles	1:49.25	$114,700	III	
2004	Artie Schiller	Richard Migliore	James A. Jerkens	Timber Bay Farm & Mrs. Thomas J. Walsh	1 1/8 miles	1:50.06	$110,000	III	
2003	Happy Trails	Shaun Bridgmohan	Steve Klesaris	Sanford Goldfarb & Team Julep Stable	1 1/8 miles	1:50.13	$113,100	III	Off turf
2002	Van Minister	Michael J. Luzzi	Carlos F. Martin	Our Sugar Bear Stable	1 1/8 miles	1:54.42	$109,300	III	
2001	Proud Man	Rene R. Douglas	Harry Benson	Double R Stable, Robert Kaufman & Stephen Weiss	1 1/8 miles	1:48.25	$114,600	III	
2000	Promontory Gold	Edgar S. Prado	Robert J. Frankel	Robert A. Witt	1 1/8 miles	1:49.15	$110,900	III	
1999	Time Off	Jean-Luc Samyn	Scott M. Schwartz	Herbert T. and Carol A. Schwartz	1 1/8 miles	1:47.48	$111,200	III	
1998	Recommended List	Jorge F. Chavez	James E. Picou	Fred W. Hooper	1 1/8 miles	1:49.28	$113,000	III	Off turf
1997	Subordination	John R. Velazquez	Gary Sciacca	Klaravich Stables	1 1/8 miles	1:45.96	$112,000	III	
1996	Optic Nerve	Jose A. Santos	Howard M. Tesher	Oak Cliff Stable	1 1/16 miles	1:39.70	$112,028	III	
1995	Green Means Go	Jerry D. Bailey	William I. Mott	Pin Oak Stable	1 1/16 miles	1:40.33	$113,600	III	
1994	Pennine Ridge	Jerry D. Bailey	David G. Donk	December Hill Farm	1 1/16 miles	1:39.87	$84,876	III	
1993	Halissee	Julie Krone	William I. Mott	John A. Nerud	1 1/16 miles	1:40.91	$86,700	III	
1992	‡Free At Last	Jerry D. Bailey	D. Wayne Lukas	Team Valor Stable	1 1/16 miles	1:41.05	$88,650	III	
1991	Young Daniel	Angel Cordero Jr.	John M. Veitch	Darby Dan Farm	1 1/16 miles	1:39.87	$96,750	III	
1990	Solar Splendor	Eddie Maple	Patrick J. Kelly	Live Oak Plantation	1 1/16 miles	1:41.20	$96,450	III	
1989	Slew the Knight	Chris Antley	John O. Hertler	Philip DiLeo	1 1/16 miles	1:41.00	$94,200	III	
1988	Sunshine Forever	Angel Cordero Jr.	John M. Veitch	Darby Dan Farm	1 1/16 miles	1:41.20	$120,200	III	
1987	Forest Fair	Jose A. Santos	John J. Lenzini Jr.	Gary Marano	1 1/16 miles	1:42.80	$121,200	III	
1986	Double Feint	Jose A. Santos	LeRoy Jolley	Peter M. Brant	1 1/16 miles	1:41.40	$88,640	III	
1985	§Danger's Hour	Donald MacBeth	MacKenzie Miller	Rokeby Stable	1 1/16 miles	1:40.60	$98,850	III	
1984	A Gift	Donald MacBeth	Joseph B. Cantey	Taylor Asbury	1 1/16 miles	1:48.40	$72,800	III	
1983	Domynsky (GB)	Jerry D. Bailey	William Curtis Jr.	Dogwood Stable	1 1/16 miles	1:48.80	$61,100	III	
At Aqueduct
1982	Majesty's Prince	Ruben Hernandez	Joseph B. Cantey	Newstead Farm	1 1/16 miles	1:43.40	$55,300	III	Division 1
1982	ƒLarida	Eddie Maple	Woodford C. Stephens	John DeWitt Marsh	1 1/16 miles	1:42.60	$55,300	III	Division 2
At Belmont Park
1981	Summing	Angel Cordero Jr.	Luis Barrera	Charles T. Wilson Jr.	1 1/16 miles	1:42.40	$59,500	III	
At Aqueduct – Hill Prince Handicap
1980	Ben Fab	Jean Cruguet	Jacques Dumas	Rene Benoit	1 1/16 miles	1:43.40	$58,000		
1979	Bends Me Mind	Jorge Velasquez	Woodford C. Stephens	Mill House Stable	1 1/16 miles	1:46.00	$57,450		
At Belmont Park
1978	Darby Creek Road	Angel Cordero Jr.	Howard M. Tesher	H. Joseph Allen	1 mile	1:35.20	$37,675		
1977	Forward Charger	Jacinto Vasquez	LeRoy Jolley	Gerald Robins	1 mile	1:34.40	$37,625		
1976	Fifth Marine	Ron Turcotte	Sidney Watters Jr.	Pamela H. Firman	1 1/16 miles	1:41.20	$45,675		
1975	†Don Jack	George Martens	Vincent J. Cincotta	Gustave Ring	1 3/8 miles	2:23.20	$57,750		

Legend:
Dirt Turf
Notes:
§ Ran as an entry
ƒ Filly or Mare
† In the inaugural running of the event in 1975 Annie's Brat finished first, but was disqualified and set back to second.
‡ In the 1992 running of the event Casino Magistrate finished first but was disqualified and set back to second.

== See also ==
List of American and Canadian Graded races
