= Subordination (horse) =

American-bred Thoroughbred racehorse

- Sire: Mt. Livermore
- Grandsire: Blushing Groom
- Dam: Not So Careless
- Damsire: Desert Wine
- Sex: Stallion
- Foaled: May 24, 1994 (age 31)
- Country: United States
- Colour: Bay
- Owner: Klaravich Stables
- Trainer: Gary Sciacca
- Record: 21: 11-3-1
- Earnings: US$1,221,068

Major wins
- Hollywood Derby (1997); Jamaica Handicap (1997); Hill Prince Stakes (1997); Eddie Read Handicap (1998); Brooklyn Handicap (1998); Belmont Breeders' Cup Handicap (1998); Fort Marcy Handicap (1998); Canadian Turf Handicap (1998)

Subordination (foaled May 24, 1994) is an American millionaire Thoroughbred racehorse who won major Graded stakes races in 1997 and 1998. Owned by Seth Klarman's Klaravich Stables and trained by Gary Sciacca, he won on both dirt and turf racing surfaces.

Retired to stud, Subordination stands in at Montana Ranch in Uruguay.
