= Scott Blasi =

American horse trainer

Personal information
- Born: August 24, 1973 (age 52) Independence, Kansas, United States
- Occupation: Trainer

Horse racing career
- Sport: Horse racing
- Career wins: 224

Significant horses
- Appealing Zophie

Scott Blasi (born August 24, 1973, in Independence, Kansas) is an American horse trainer.

== Early life ==
Scott Blasi graduated from Caney Valley High School in 1992. Scott later attended Kansas State University and Oklahoma State University, majoring in pre-veterinary studies. His parents are Joel and Jeanie Blasi, and Scott has one younger sister Kristie, and two older brothers, Ray and Greg. Greg is married to Helen Pitts-Blasi and is an Outrider at Churchill Downs.

== Racing background ==
Scott's father, Joel Blasi, trained Quarter Horses in Kansas at fair meets, and Scott says he grew up in the barn. When he was 18, his father began training thoroughbreds at the now defunct Ak-Sar-Ben in Omaha, Nebraska, and Scott was also involved in the stable. "I've been around horses and racing all of my life", he said.

== Training career and achievements ==
Scott is one of the assistants of Steve Asmussen and has performed duties for him which include handling the Churchill Downs and Fair Grounds divisions where the best horses such as Curlin and Rachel Alexandra were held in stables. Thanks to his training Curlin won Horse of the Year Award and also the 2007 Breeders' Cup Classic. In 2008 the same one won Dubai World Cup and retired the same year at Lane's End in Versailles, Kentucky. By July 10, 2006, Blasi was already a professional trainer and got Golden Hare, a popular horse who won 14 races in 2007 alone in North America. In 2006, Appealing Zophie won the Spinaway Stakes which were held at Saratoga Race Course, later on she claimed fourth place in Juvenile Fillies.
