= National Museum of Racing Hall of Fame Stakes =

- Class: Grade II
- Location: Saratoga Race Course; Saratoga Springs, New York, United States
- Inaugurated: 1985 (as Gallant Man Stakes)
- Race type: Thoroughbred – Flat racing
- Website: NYRA

Race information
- Distance: 1 mile
- Surface: Turf
- Track: Left-handed
- Qualification: Three-years-old
- Weight: 124lbs with allowances
- Purse: US$400,000 (2025)

The National Museum of Racing Hall of Fame Stakes is a Grade II American Thoroughbred horse race for three year old horses run over a distance of one mile on the turf held annually in July at Saratoga Race Course in Saratoga Springs, New York.

== History ==
The event was inaugurated as the Gallant Man Stakes in honor of the U.S. Racing Hall of Fame horse, Gallant Man, on 17 August 1985 as the sixth event in the under-card for Travers Stakes Day and was won by Duluth who was ridden by Jean Cruguet easily by 5 1/2 lengths in a time of 1:47 3/5.

The event was upgraded to Grade III in 1987.

In 1992 the event was renamed to the National Museum of Racing Hall of Fame Stakes. National Museum of Racing opened in Saratoga Springs in 1951. In 1955, the Museum moved to its present site on Union Avenue, across the street from Saratoga Race Course. That year, 1992, the event was upgraded to Grade II and held that class since except for 2013 when the race was moved from the turf track to the dirt track due to the state of the track and subsequently was downgraded to Grade III.

The event has been run over several distances, including a mile and an eighth from 1985 to 1995, a mile and a sixteenth in 1996 and 1997 and in 1998, the distance was changed back to a mile and an eighth. In 2019 the event was held over a mile.

Several three-year-olds who won this event went on to prove themselves as champions. Of these include 1992 winner Paradise Creek who in 1994 became US Champion Male Turf Horse. The 2004 winner Artie Schiller won the 2005 Breeders' Cup Mile after failing in 2004. The 2011 winner Big Blue Kitten also became 2015 US Champion Male Turf Horse and 2017 winner Bricks and Mortar who was voted US Horse of the Year in 2019.

In 2020 the event was run over 1 1/8 miles and the following year was reverted back to one mile.

In 2023 the purse for the event was increased to $500,000. Originally the event was scheduled for August 4 but due to a torrential rainstorm the race was postponed until August 11.

== Records ==
Speed record:

- 1 mile: 1:33.72 – Casa Creed (2019)
- 1 1/16 miles: 1:39.47 – Bricks and Mortar (2017)
- 1 1/8 miles: 1:45.90 – Courageous Cat (2009)

Margins:

- 5 1/2 lengths – Duluth (1985)

Most wins by a jockey:

- 7 – Jerry D. Bailey (1986, 1988, 1996, 1997, 1999, 2001, 2003)

Most wins by a trainer:

- 7 – Chad C. Brown (2011, 2015, 2016, 2017, 2018, 2021, 2023)

Most wins by an owner:

- 3 – Klaravich Stables (2015, 2019, 2021)

== Winners ==
Year	Winner	Jockey	Trainer	Owner	Distance	Time	Purse	Grade	Ref
National Museum of Racing Hall of Fame Stakes
2026	Bottas	Manuel Franco	Miguel Clement	Dahman	1 mile	1:34.67	$400,000	II	
2025	Luther (GB) (Note: Zulu Kingdom originally finished first, but was disqualified and placed 4th for interference entering the first turn.)	Joel Rosario	Charlie Fellowes	Paul Hickman and Nicholas Jones	1 mile	1:35.06	$400,000	II	
2024	Neat	Junior Alvarado	Rob Atras	Red White and Blue Racing	1 mile	1:36.38	$500,000	II	
2023	Carl Spackler (IRE)	Tyler Gaffalione	Chad C. Brown	e Five Racing	1 mile	1:36.29	$500,000	II	
2022	Ready to Purrform	Joel Rosario	Brad H. Cox	Donegal Racing	1 mile	1:33.99	$200,000	II	
2021	Public Sector	Flavien Prat	Chad C. Brown	Klaravich Stables	1 mile	1:35.03	$200,000	II	
2020	Decorated Invader	Joel Rosario	Christophe Clement	West Point Thoroughbreds, William T Freeman Et Al	1 1/8 miles	1:49.29	$150,000	II	
2019	Casa Creed	Junior Alvarado	William I. Mott	LRE Racing & JEH Racing Stable	1 mile	1:33.72	$200,000	II	
2018	Raging Bull (FR)	Joel Rosario	Chad C. Brown	Peter M. Brant	1 1/16 miles	1:43.69	$200,000	II	
2017	Bricks and Mortar	Joel Rosario	Chad C. Brown	William H. Lawrence & Klaravich Stables	1 1/16 miles	1:39.47	$200,000	II	
2016	Camelot Kitten	Irad Ortiz Jr.	Chad C. Brown	Kenneth L. and Sarah K. Ramsey	1 1/16 miles	1:41.69	$200,000	II	
2015	Takeover Target	Irad Ortiz Jr.	Chad C. Brown	William H. Lawrence & Klaravich Stables	1 1/16 miles	1:42.00	$200,000	II	
2014	Wallyanna	Irad Ortiz Jr.	Michael V. Pino	Tim E. O'Donohue Racing Stable	1 1/16 miles	1:40.66	$200,000	II	
2013	Notacatbutallama	John R. Velazquez	Todd A. Pletcher	Repole Stable	1 1/8 miles	1:52.29	$196,000	III	Off turf
2012	Quick Wit	Rajiv Maragh	Dale L. Romans	Michael J. Bruder	1 1/8 miles	1:51.95	$200,000	II	Off turf
2011	Big Blue Kitten	John R. Velazquez	Chad C. Brown	Kenneth L. and Sarah K. Ramsey	1 1/16 miles	1:42.91	$150,000	II	
2010	Interactif	Javier Castellano	Todd A. Pletcher	Wertheimer et Frère	1 1/8 miles	1:48.34	$150,000	II	
2009	Courageous Cat	Kent J. Desormeaux	William I. Mott	Pam & Martin Wygod	1 1/8 miles	1:45.90	$160,000	II	
2008	Wesley	Javier Castellano	Mark A. Hennig	Willmott Stables	1 1/8 miles	1:50.22	$159,600	II	
2007	Nobiz Like Shobiz	Cornelio Velásquez	Barclay Tagg	Elizabeth Jones Valando	1 1/8 miles	1:49.29	$158,000	II	
2006	After Market	Cornelio Velásquez	William I. Mott	Pam & Martin Wygod	1 1/8 miles	1:48.45	$146,700	II	
2005	T. D. Vance	Todd Kabel	H. Graham Motion	Donald A. Adam	1 1/8 miles	1:48.15	$150,000	II	
National Museum of Racing Hall of Fame Handicap
2004	Artie Schiller	Richard Migliore	James A. Jerkens	Timber Bay Farm & Mrs. Thomas J. Walsh	1 1/8 miles	1:47.71	$150,000	II	
2003	Stroll	Jerry D. Bailey	William I. Mott	Claiborne Farm	1 1/8 miles	1:49.34	$150,000	II	
2002	Quest Star	Pat Day	W. Elliott Walden	Mansell Stables	1 1/8 miles	1:49.66	$150,000	II	
2001	Baptize	Jerry D. Bailey	William I. Mott	Gary and Mary West Stables	1 1/8 miles	1:47.94	$150,000	II	
2000	Turnofthecentury	Aaron Gryder	Michael E. Hushion	Barry K. Schwartz & Eugene Hauman	1 1/8 miles	1:52.35	$150,000	II	Off turf
1999	Marquette	Jerry D. Bailey	Richard A. Violette Jr.	J. R. Cavanaugh	1 1/8 miles	1:49.33	$150,000	II	
1998	Parade Ground	Shane Sellers	Neil J. Howard	William S. Farish III	1 1/8 miles	1:47.82	$150,000	II	
National Museum of Racing Hall of Fame Stakes
1997	Rob 'n Gin	Jerry D. Bailey	Robert Barbara	Sabine Stable	1 1/16 miles	1:42.09	$110,000	II	
1996	Sir Cat	Jerry D. Bailey	William I. Mott	John R. Murrell	1 1/16 miles	1:40.46	$113,900	II	
1995	Flitch	Mike E. Smith	William Badgett Jr.	Loblolly Stable	1 1/8 miles	1:48.08	$139,500	II	
1994	Islefaxyou	Eddie Maple	Patrick J. Kelly	Fox Ridge Farm	1 1/8 miles	1:48.61	$117,000	II	
1993	A in Sociology	Chris Antley	Philip G. Johnson	Frederick Ronca	1 1/8 miles	1:48.81	$121,800	II	
1992	Paradise Creek	Mike E. Smith	William I. Mott	Bertram R. Firestone	1 1/8 miles	1:46.65	$121,000	II	
Gallant Man Stakes
1991	Lech	Ángel Cordero Jr.	David G. Donk	Henryk de Kwiatkowski	1 1/8 miles	1:49.02	$123,200	III	
1990	Social Retiree	Mike E. Smith	Barclay Tagg	Barclay Tagg	1 1/8 miles	1:48.20	$91,200	III	
1989	Orange Sunshine	Jean Cruguet	Jimmy Croll	Blanche P. Levy	1 1/8 miles	1:49.00	$93,300	III	
1988	Posen	Jerry D. Bailey	Woodford C. Stephens	Henryk de Kwiatkowski	1 1/8 miles	1:47.00	$92,850	III	
1987	§ Drachma	Robbie Davis	Larry A. Kelly	Gail P. Beitz	1 1/8 miles	1:49.80	$85,800	III	
1986	Dance of Life	Jerry D. Bailey	MacKenzie Miller	Rokeby Stable	1 1/8 miles	1:52.20	$83,100		
1985	Duluth	Jean Cruguet	Flint S. Schulhofer	Frances A. Genter	1 1/8 miles	1:47.60	$85,950		

Legend:
Turf Dirt
Notes:
§ Ran as an entry

== See also ==
- List of American and Canadian Graded races
