= Turf Classic Stakes =

- Class: Grade I
- Location: Churchill Downs; Louisville, Kentucky, United States
- Inaugurated: 1987 (as Early Times Turf Classic Stakes)
- Race type: Thoroughbred – Flat racing
- Sponsor: Old Forester (since 2018)
- Website: Churchill Downs

Race information
- Distance: 1 1/8 miles (9 furlongs)
- Surface: Turf
- Track: Left-handed
- Qualification: Four-year-olds and older
- Weight: 124 lbs with allowances
- Purse: $1,500,000 (since 2026)

The Turf Classic Stakes is a Grade I American thoroughbred horse race held annually in early May on the day of the Kentucky Derby, meeting on the turf at Churchill Downs in Louisville, Kentucky. The race distance is one and one-eighth miles and is open to horses aged four and older.

== History ==
This race was inaugurated on 1 May 1987 as the Early Times Turf Classic Stakes and was the first stakes race run on the new Matt Winn Turf Course. The event was won by the reigning US Champion Male Turf Horse Manila, his eighth straight victory by three lengths as the short 2-5 odds-on favorite in a small field of four starters.

The event was classified as Grade III in 1989 for its third running, upgraded to Grade II in 1994 and since 1996 a Grade I.

The event has had three sponsor name changes which have contributed to the high purse and growth is status of the event. The sponsorship has been by the Brown-Forman Corporation, one of the largest North American-owned companies in the spirits and wine business which is based in Louisville. The sponsorship has been reflected in the name of the event since the first running. Early Times, from 1987 to 1999, Woodford Reserve, from 2000 to 2017 and since 2018 Old Forester.

The event has attracted the finest turf horses. The 1993 winner Lure set the speed record for the event with fast time of 1:46.34. Lure continued on to win the Breeders' Cup Mile for the second time later that year. The following year, in 1994 the winner Paradise Creek won the Arlington Million en route to being voted the U. S. Champion Male Turf Horse. In recent years the winners include two-time US Horse of the Year Wise Dan dual winner in 2013 and 2014 and Bricks and Mortar who would be crowned U. S. Horse of the Year in 2019.

== Records ==
Speed record

- 1:45.96 – Rhetorical (2026)

Margins

- 4 3/4 lengths – Wise Dan (2013)

Most wins

- 2 – Einstein (BRZ) (2008, 2009)
- 2 – Wise Dan (2013, 2014)
- 2 – Divisidero (2016, 2017)

Most wins by an owner

- 4 – Klaravich Stables (2019, 2020, 2021, 2024)

Most wins by a jockey

- 4 – Irad Ortiz Jr. (2019, 2021, 2023, 2026)

Most wins by a Trainer

- 5 – Chad Brown (2019, 2020, 2021, 2024, 2025)

== Winners ==
Year	Winner	Age	Jockey	Trainer	Owner	Distance	Time	Purse	Grade	Ref
2026	Rhetorical	5	Irad Ortiz Jr.	William Walden	Gary Barber, Cheyenne Stable & Wachtel Stable	1 1/8 miles	1:45.96	$1,414,000	I	
2025	Spirit of St Louis	6	Manuel Franco	Chad C. Brown	Madaket Stables, Michael Dubb & Richard Schermerhorn	1 1/8 miles	1:48.20	$934,200	I	
2024	Program Trading (GB)	4	Flavien Prat	Chad C. Brown	Klaravich Stables	1 1/8 miles	1:50.30	$1,000,000	I	
2023	Up to the Mark	4	Irad Ortiz Jr.	Todd A. Pletcher	Repole Stable & St. Elias Stable	1 1/8 miles	1:47.31	$990,000	I	
2022	Santin	4	Tyler Gaffalione	Brendan P. Walsh	Godolphin	1 1/8 miles	1:49.72	$1,000,000	I	
2021	Colonel Liam	4	Irad Ortiz Jr.	Todd A. Pletcher	Lawana & Robert Low	1 1/8 miles	1:47.99	$1,000,000	I	Dead heat
2021	Domestic Spending (GB)	4	Flavien Prat	Chad C. Brown	Klaravich Stables	1 1/8 miles	1:47.99	$1,000,000	I	Dead heat
2020	Digital Age (IRE)	4	Javier Castellano	Chad C. Brown	Klaravich Stables	1 1/8 miles	1:47.79	$1,000,000	I	
2019	Bricks and Mortar	5	Irad Ortiz Jr.	Chad C. Brown	Klaravich Stables & William H. Lawrence	1 1/8 miles	1:51.80	$1,000,000	I	
2018	Yoshida (JPN)	4	José L. Ortiz	William I. Mott	China Horse Club, WinStar Farm & Head of Plains Partners	1 1/8 miles	1:54.64	$500,000	I	
2017	Divisidero	5	Julien R. Leparoux	William B. Bradley	Gunpowder Farms	1 1/8 miles	1:52.42	$500,000	I	
2016	Divisidero	4	Edgar S. Prado	William B. Bradley	Gunpowder Farms	1 1/8 miles	1:47.37	$500,000	I	
2015	Finnegans Wake	6	Victor Espinoza	Peter L. Miller	Donegal Racing & Rockingham Ranch	1 1/8 miles	1:47.24	$500,000	I	
2014	Wise Dan	7	John R. Velazquez	Charles LoPresti	Morton Fink	1 1/8 miles	1:47.73	$559,100	I	
2013	Wise Dan	6	Jose Lezcano	Charles LoPresti	Morton Fink	1 1/8 miles	1:51.84	$546,400	I	
2012	Little Mike	5	Joe Bravo	Dale L. Romans	Priscilla Vaccarezza	1 1/8 miles	1:48.81	$561,500	I	
2011	Get Stormy	5	Ramon A. Dominguez	Thomas M. Bush	Sullimar Stables	1 1/8 miles	1:50.81	$581,400	I	
2010	General Quarters	4	Rafael Bejarano	Thomas R. McCarthy	Thomas R. McCarthy	1 1/8 miles	1:53.42	$578,100	I	
2009	Einstein (BRZ)	7	Julien R. Leparoux	Helen Pitts-Blasi	Midnight Cry Stable	1 1/8 miles	1:49.62	$557,600	I	
2008	Einstein (BRZ)	6	Robby Albarado	Helen Pitts-Blasi	Patricia Cunningham & Melissa Greene	1 1/8 miles	1:50.50	$548,300	I	
2007	Sky Conqueror	5	Javier Castellano	Darwin D. Banach	William A. Sorokolit Sr.	1 1/8 miles	1:49.01	$561,000	I	
2006	English Channel	4	Garrett K. Gomez	Todd A. Pletcher	James T. Scatuorchio	1 1/8 miles	1:47.15	$454,900	I	
2005	America Alive	4	Robby Albarado	Neil J. Howard	Mill House Stable	1 1/8 miles	1:47.34	$470,400	I	
2004	Stroll	4	Jerry D. Bailey	William I. Mott	Claiborne Farm	1 1/8 miles	1:53.00	$453,900	I	
2003	Honor in War	4	David R. Flores	Paul J. McGee	3rd Turn Stables	1 1/8 miles	1:46.67	$445,300	I	
2002	Beat Hollow (GB)	5	Alex O. Solis	Robert J. Frankel	Juddmonte Farms	1 1/8 miles	1:47.35	$452,500	I	
2001	White Heart (GB)	6	Gary L. Stevens	Neil D. Drysdale	Gainsborough Farms	1 1/8 miles	1:48.75	$349,900	I	
2000	Manndar (IRE)	4	Corey Nakatani	C. Beau Greely	Columbine Stable, Jay M. Jones & Tom Nichols	1 1/8 miles	1:47.91	$350,500	I	
1999	Wild Event	6	Shane Sellers	Louis M. Goldfine	Arthur I. Appleton	1 1/8 miles	1:47.25	$333,300	I	
1998	Joyeux Danseur	5	Robby Albarado	Albert Stall Jr.	B. Wayne Hughes	1 1/8 miles	1:48.14	$281,100	I	
1997	Always a Classic	4	Jerry D. Bailey	Mark R. Frostad	Sam-Son Farm	1 1/8 miles	1:49.29	$234,400	I	
1996	Mecke	4	Pat Day	Emanuel Tortora	James R. Lewis Jr.	1 1/8 miles	1:49.48	$254,200	I	
1995	Romarin (BRZ)	5	Corey Nakatani	Richard E. Mandella	Linneo Eduardo de Paula Machado	1 1/8 miles	1:46.86	$246,300	II	
1994	Paradise Creek	5	Pat Day	William I. Mott	Masayuki Nishiyama	1 1/8 miles	1:48.34	$233,950	II	
1993	Lure	4	Mike E. Smith	Claude R. McGaughey III	Claiborne Farm	1 1/8 miles	1:46.34	$181,050	III	
1992	Cudas	4	Pat Valenzuela	Richard J. Lundy	Allen E. Paulson	1 1/8 miles	1:46.56	$191,850	III	
1991	§ Opening Verse	5	Chris McCarron	Richard J. Lundy	Allen E. Paulson	1 1/8 miles	1:47.22	$192,400	III	
1990	Ten Keys	6	Kent J. Desormeaux	Michael V. Pino	Charles Linhoss	1 1/8 miles	1:50.80	$169,900	III	
1989	Equalize	7	José A. Santos	Angel Penna Sr.	Alejandro Menditeguy	1 1/8 miles	1:51.40	$175,600	III	
1988	Yankee Affair	6	Pat Day	Henry L. Carroll	Jujugen Stable	1 1/8 miles	1:50.00	$186,500	Listed	
1987	Manila	4	Jacinto Vásquez	LeRoy Jolley	Bradley M. Shannon	1 1/8 miles	1:48.80	$169,300	Listed	

Legend:

Turf
Notes:
§ Ran as an entry

== See also ==
- List of graded stakes at Churchill Downs
- List of American and Canadian Graded races
