= Pegasus World Cup Turf Invitational =

- Class: Grade I
- Location: Gulfstream Park; Hallandale Beach, Florida, United States
- Inaugurated: 1986 (as Gulfstream Park Breeders' Cup Handicap)
- Race type: Thoroughbred – Flat racing
- Website: Gulfstream Park

Race information
- Distance: 1 1/8 miles
- Surface: Turf
- Track: Left-handed
- Qualification: Invitation - Four year olds and older
- Weight: 123 lbs. Fillies and Mares allowed 5 lbs. Southern Hemisphere Three-Year-Olds: 117 lbs.
- Purse: $750,000 (since 2027)

The Pegasus World Cup Turf Invitational is a Grade I American Thoroughbred horse race, by invitation for four-year-olds and older over a distance of one and one-eighth miles on the turf track, held annually in late January or early February at Gulfstream Park, Hallandale Beach, Florida. The event currently carries a purse of $750,000.

== History ==
The inaugural running of the event was on 2 March 1986, on the last day of a 71-day annual winter meeting as the Gulfstream Park Breeders' Cup Handicap, the tenth race on the under-card of Florida Derby day. The event had additional sponsorship from the Breeders' Cup which gave the event immediate recognition and value. The event was won by Craig B. Singer's Irish-bred five-year-old Sondrio who started at odds of 7/1 and ran the 1 1/16 miles distance in 1:40.60 winning by 2 1/4 lengths.

The following year the event was held on the dirt track due to the condition of the turf track. The event had additional sponsorship from Budweiser and this reflected in the name of the race. Budweiser sponsorship continued for nine years ceasing after the 1995 running of the event.

The event was upgraded in 1990 by the American Graded Stakes Committee to a Grade III race. In 1991 the distance of the event was lengthened considerably to 1 3/8 miles and the following year the event was upgraded to Grade II classification. In 1994 the event was transferred to the dirt track and held over a distance of 1 1/4 miles.

After the 2007 running of the event the Breeders' Cup ceased to sponsor the event and the event was known as the Gulfstream Park Turf Handicap. In 2009 the distance of the event was decreased by two furlongs to 1 1/8 miles.

In 2019 Gulfstream Park Administration created a racing series called the Pegasus World Cup and this event was rebranded as the Pegasus World Cup Turf Invitational. In the first edition, each entrant's connections had to pay a $500,000 entry fee with the organizer adding an extra $1,000,000 for a total purse of $7,000,000. In the 2020 edition, the race adopted the Invitational format and entry fees were suppressed, so the purse was limited to the organizer contribution.

In November 2026, it was announced that the purse of the Pegasus World Cup Turf would be reduced to $750,000 for its 2027 running.

== Records ==
Time record:

- 1 3/16 miles: 1:51.60 – Zulu Alpha (2020)
- 1 1/16 miles: 1:39.60 – Youmadeyourpoint (1990)
- 1 1/8 miles: 1:44.45 – Warm Heart (IRE) (2024)
- 1 3/8 miles: 2:10.73 – Yagli (1999)

Margins:

- 4 3/4 lengths – Man from Wicklow (2003)

Most wins:

- 2 – Einstein (2006, 2008)
- 2 – Colonel Liam (2021, 2022)

Most wins by an owner:

- 2 – Allen E. Paulson (1998, 1999)
- 2 – The Thoroughbred Corporation (2000, 2001)
- 2 – Midnight Cry Stables (2006, 2008)
- 2 – IEAH Stables (2009, 2010)
- 2 – Robert E. & Lawana L. Low (2021, 2022)

Most wins by a jockey:

- 7 – Jerry Bailey (1992, 1993, 1994, 1997, 1999, 2000, 2003)

Most wins by a trainer:

- 5 – William I. Mott (1993, 1997, 1999, 2000, 2001)

== Winners ==
Year	Winner	Age	Jockey	Trainer	Owner	Distance	Time	Purse	Grade	Ref
Pegasus World Cup Turf Invitational
2026	Test Score	4	Manny Franco	H. Graham Motion	Amerman Racing	1 1/8 miles	1:47.04	$937,800	I	
2025	Spirit of St Louis	6	Tyler Gaffalione	Chad Brown	Madaket Stables, Michael Dubb & Richard Schermerhorn	1 1/8 miles	1:44.50	$928,400	I	
2024	Warm Heart (IRE)	4	Ryan Moore	Aidan O'Brien	Derrick Smith, Mrs. John Magnier, Michael Tabor & Westerburg	1 1/8 miles	1:44.45	$952,300	I	
2023	Atone	6	Irad Ortiz Jr.	Michael J. Maker	Three Diamonds Farm	1 1/8 miles	1:46.19	$981,400	I	
2022	Colonel Liam	5	Irad Ortiz Jr.	Todd A. Pletcher	Robert E. & Lawana L. Low	abt. 1 1/8 miles	1:48.00	$982,300	I	
2021	Colonel Liam	4	Irad Ortiz Jr.	Todd A. Pletcher	Robert E. & Lawana L. Low	1 3/16 miles	1:53.09	$981,700	I	
2020	Zulu Alpha	7	Tyler Gaffalione	Michael J. Maker	Michael Hui	1 3/16 miles	1:51.60	$982,300	I	
2019	Bricks and Mortar	5	Irad Ortiz Jr.	Chad Brown	Klaravich Stables & William H. Lawrence	1 3/16 miles	1:54.59	$6,708,329	I	
Gulfstream Park Turf Stakes
2018	Heart to Heart	7	Julien R. Leparoux	Brian A. Lynch	Terry Hamilton	1 1/8 miles	1:47.64	$300,000	I	
Gulfstream Park Turf Handicap
2017	Almanaar (GB)	5	Joel Rosario	Chad Brown	Shadwell Racing	1 1/8 miles	1:45.63	$350,000	I	
2016	Lukes Alley	6	Paco Lopez	Josie Carroll	Melnyk Racing Stables	1 1/8 miles	1:48.20	$350,000	I	
2015	Mshawish	5	Javier Castellano	Todd A. Pletcher	Al Shaqab Racing	1 1/8 miles	1:47.22	$300,000	I	
2014	Lochte	4	Orlando Bocachica	Marcus J. Vitali	Crossed Sabres Farm	1 1/8 miles	1:45.67	$300,000	I	
2013	Point of Entry	5	John Velazquez	Claude R. McGaughey III	Phipps Stable	1 1/8 miles	1:47.00	$300,000	I	
2012	Get Stormy	6	Ramon Domínguez	Thomas Bush	Mary Sullivan	1 1/8 miles	1:52.78	$300,000	I	
2011	Teaks North	4	Jose Valdivia Jr.	Justin Sallusto	Jules Boutelle	1 1/8 miles	1:46.39	$300,000	I	
2010	† Court Vision	5	Robby Albarado	Richard E. Dutrow Jr.	IEAH Stables, Resolute Group Stables & WinStar Farm	1 1/8 miles	1:46.84	$300,000	I	
2009	Kip Deville	6	Cornelio Velásquez	Richard E. Dutrow Jr.	IEAH Stables, John A. & Andrew Cohen, Steve Cobb & Doug Robertson	1 1/8 miles	1:45.70	$300,000	I	
Gulfstream Park Turf Stakes
2008	Einstein (BRZ)	6	Jose Lezcano	Helen Pitts	Midnight Cry Stables	1 3/8 miles	2:12.87	$273,000	I	
Gulfstream Park Breeder's Cup Turf Stakes
2007	Jambalaya	5	Javier Castellano	Catherine Day Phillips	Todd & Catherine Day Phillips	1 3/8 miles	2:12.28	$289,000	I	
Gulfstream Park Breeder's Cup Stakes
2006	Einstein (BRZ)	4	Rafael Bejarano	Helen Pitts	Midnight Cry Stables	1 7/16 miles	2:23.91	$190,000	I	
Gulfstream Park Breeder's Cup Handicap
2005	Prince Arch	4	Brice Blanc	Kenneth McPeek	Ray Cottrell Sr.	1 3/8 miles	2:11.44	$230,000	I	
2004	Hard Buck (BRZ)	5	Edgar Prado	Kenneth McPeek	Team Victory I	1 3/8 miles	2:11.56	$190,000	I	
2003	Man from Wicklow	6	Jerry Bailey	Richard A. Violette Jr.	Richard A. Violette Jr.	1 3/8 miles	2:11.62	$194,000	I	
2002	Cetewayo	8	Cornelio Velásquez	Michael Dickinson	Dr. John A. Chandler	1 3/8 miles	2:17.44	$200,000	I	
2001	Subtle Power (IRE)	4	Pat Day	William I. Mott	The Thoroughbred Corporation	1 3/8 miles	2:13.50	$140,000	I	
2000	Royal Anthem	5	Jerry Bailey	William I. Mott	The Thoroughbred Corporation	1 3/8 miles	2:11.34	$194,000	I	
1999	§ Yagli	6	Jerry Bailey	William I. Mott	Allen E. Paulson	1 3/8 miles	2:10.73	$200,000	I	
1998	Flag Down	8	José A. Santos	Christophe Clement	Allen E. Paulson	1 3/8 miles	2:12.59	$189,000	II	
1997	Lassigny	6	Jerry Bailey	William I. Mott	Prince Sultan Modc Saud Al Kabeer	1 3/8 miles	2:11.33	$169,150	II	
1996	Celtic Arms (FR)	5	Mike E. Smith	Rodney Rash	Gary A. Tanaka	1 3/8 miles	2:13.90	$169,800	II	
1995	Misil	7	José A. Santos	Christophe Clement	Horafuki Kai	1 3/8 miles	2:12.41	$157,000	II	
1994	Strolling Along	4	Jerry Bailey	Claude R. McGaughey III	Ogden Phipps	1 1/4 miles	2:05.01	$149,250	II	Off turf
1993	Stagecraft (GB)	6	Jerry Bailey	William I. Mott	Darley Stud	1 3/8 miles	2:13.24	$156,000	II	
1992	Passagere du Soir (GB)	5	Jerry Bailey	Christophe Clement	Paul de Moussac	1 3/8 miles	2:15.71	$158,550	II	
1991	Shy Tom	5	Craig Perret	D. Wayne Lukas	Overbrook Farm	1 3/8 miles	2:14.70	$158,000	III	
1990	Youmadeyourpoint	4	Douglas Valiente	Eugene Navarro	Stanley M. Ersoff	1 1/16 miles	1:39.60	$157,600	III	
1989	Equalize	7	José A. Santos	Angel Penna Sr.	A. J. Menditeguy Stable	1 1/16 miles	1:41.20	$155,350		
1988	Salem Drive	6	Gene St. Leon	Thomas J. Skiffington Jr.	Virginia Kraft Payson	1 1/16 miles	1:40.60	$157,550		
1987	Bolshoi Boy	4	Randy Romero	Howard M. Tesher	Arthur Belford & John Greathouse Jr.	1 1/16 miles	1:44.60	$133,810		Off turf
1986	Sondrio (IRE)	5	José A. Santos	Howard M. Tesher	Craig B. Singer	1 1/16 miles	1:40.60	$134,620		

Legend:
Turf Dirt
Notes:
§ Ran as an entry
† In the 2010 running of the event Take The Points was first past but was disqualified for interference in the straight and placed fifth and Court Vision was declared the winner.

== See also ==
- List of American and Canadian Graded races
- Gulfstream Park Turf Handicap top three finishers
- Pegasus World Cup
