= Einstein (horse) =

Brazilian-bred Thoroughbred racehorse

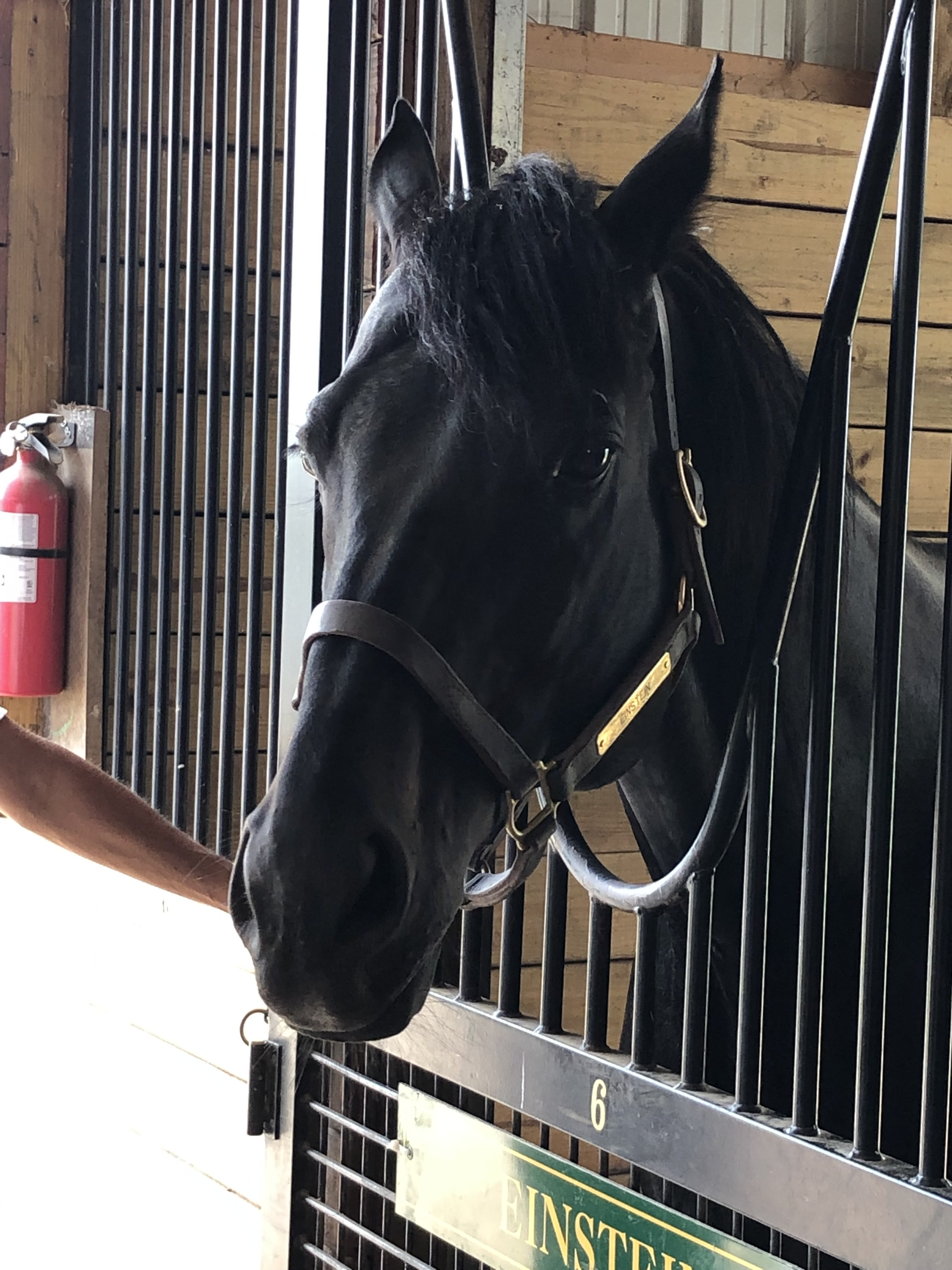
- Einstein at Old Friends (2019)
- Sire: Spend A Buck
- Grandsire: Buckaroo
- Dam: Gay Charm
- Damsire: Ghadeer
- Sex: Stallion
- Foaled: October 23, 2002
- Died: October 28, 2020 (aged 18)
- Country: Brazil
- Colour: Dark Bay/Brown
- Breeder: Fazenda Mondesir
- Owner: Frank Stronach
- Trainer: Helen Pitts-Blasi
- Record: 30: 11-4-4
- Earnings: US $2,945,238

Major wins
- Gulfstream Park Turf Handicap (2006, 2008); Mervin H. Muniz Jr. Memorial Handicap (2007); Turf Classic Stakes (2008, 2009); Clark Handicap (2008); Santa Anita Handicap (2009); Woodford Reserve (2008, 2009)

Einstein (October 23, 2002 – October 28, 2020) was a Thoroughbred racehorse who competed in the United States.

== Background ==
Einstein was a dark bay or brown horse bred in Brazil by Fazenda Mondesir. He was sired by the 1985 American Horse of the Year, Spend A Buck. His dam, Gay Charm, was the 1988 Brazilian Champion Three-Year-Old Filly. His damsire was Ghadeer, a son of Lyphard and an influential stallion in Brazil who sired twenty-five Group One winners.

When he was brought to the United States, Einstein's new owners entrusted his race conditioning to Helen Pitts, who had taken over their stable upon the retirement of Kenneth McPeek.

== Racing career ==
Einstein made his American debut on February 25, 2006, at Gulfstream Park in Florida, where he won the first of his two Gulfstream Park Turf Handicaps. He went on to wins that include races on three different track surfaces: the Turf Classic Stakes on turf and the Clark Handicap on dirt, both in 2008 at Churchill Downs, and in 2009, California's richest race, the Santa Anita Handicap on Pro-Ride synthetic dirt.

Einstein successfully defended his title in the Grade I Woodford Reserve-sponsored Turf Classic Stakes on May 2, 2009. on June 13 he was going for a world record, trying to be the first horse to win Grade 1 races on all three surfaces in the same year, first in the Santa Anita, then in the Woodford, and lastly on dirt in the race he got second in before, the Stephen Foster Handicap. In the Stephen Foster, he struggled to obtain a clear run and was repeatedly blocked before finishing third to Macho Again.

Next, he ran in the Arlington Million, a race he placed badly in 2008. He went up against the world's top turf horses, including American stars Gio Ponti and Presious Passion and International turf horses Gloria De Campeao (the French horse who placed second in the 2009 Dubai World Cup), Cima de Triomphe, and Stotsfold. Other American entries were Mr. Sidney, Just As Well, and Recapturetheglory, who placed fifth in the 2008 Kentucky Derby. Einstein ran a bad race, and never showed the late kick he usually had, coming in sixth to rising star Gio Ponti.

On September 3, 2009, it was announced that Frank Stronach purchased the horse from Midnight Cry Stables.

Einstein ran in the Pacific Classic Stakes at Del Mar Racetrack in California but was beaten by a neck by longshot Richard's Kid. His next race was the Breeders' Cup Classic on November 7. He had already won on the same track at the same distance over the same surface, but due to the entries of Rip Van Winkle and the top mare in the country Zenyatta, he was not a favorite. "It's the biggest race of his life, I want him to come in fresh," trainer Helen Pitts said. Einstein proved to be one of the major disappointments in the race, finishing 11th out of 12 runners.

On November 27 at Churchill Downs Einstein ran in the Grade II Clark Handicap and, carrying the high weight of the race, finished a game third after starting from the outside gate (14th Post Position) and being blocked in the stretch.

In 2006, Einstein was rated 117 (tied for 72nd) in the World Thoroughbred Racehorse Rankings. In 2007, Einstein was rated 117 (tied for 79th) in the World Thoroughbred Racehorse Rankings. In 2008, Einstein was rated 118 (tied for 80th) in the World Thoroughbred Rankings. In 2009, Einstein was rated 120 (tied for 43rd) in the World Thoroughbred Rankings.

== Racing statistics ==
Einstein's Career Statistics
Date	Age	Distance	Surface	Race	Grade	Track	Odds	Time	Field	Finish	Margin	Jockey	Trainer	Owner	Ref
Oct 22, 2005	3	7 furlongs	Dirt	Maiden	Maiden Special Weight	Keeneland	4.70	1:28.07	12	5	(14 1/4 lengths)	Rafael Bejarano	Helen Pitts	Midnight Cry Stable	
Nov 6, 2005	3	1 mile	Dirt	Maiden	Maiden Special Weight	Churchill Downs	2.40*	1:36.98	9	1	5 3/4 lengths	Rafael Bejarano	Helen Pitts	Midnight Cry Stable	
Nov 25, 2005	3	1 1/16 miles	Turf	Allowance	Allowance	Churchill Downs	9.90	1:43.44	12	4	(2 1/2 lengths)	Rafael Bejarano	Helen Pitts	Midnight Cry Stable	
Jan 7, 2006	3	1 1/8 miles	Turf	Allowance	Allowance	Gulfstream Park	5.30	1:45.84	12	1	1/2 length	Rafael Bejarano	Helen Pitts	Midnight Cry Stable	
Feb 4, 2006	3	1 1/8 miles	Dirt	Allowance	Allowance	Gulfstream Park	1.60*	1:49.36	9	1	7 lengths	Rafael Bejarano	Helen Pitts	Midnight Cry Stable	
Feb 25, 2006	3	1 7/16 miles	Turf	Gulfstream Park Breeders' Cup Stakes	G1	Gulfstream Park	7.20	2:23.91	8	1	Neck	Rafael Bejarano	Helen Pitts	Midnight Cry Stable	
Apr 1, 2006	3	1 1/2 miles	Turf	Pan American Handicap	G2	Gulfstream Park	2.60	2:24.35	8	4	(4 3/4 lengths)	Rafael Bejarano	Helen Pitts	Midnight Cry Stable	
May 6, 2006	3	1 1/8 miles	Turf	Woodford Reserve Turf Classic Stakes	G1	Churchill Downs	15.80	1:47.15	10	4	(1 3/4 lengths)	Rafael Bejarano	Helen Pitts	Midnight Cry Stable	
Jan 31, 2007	4	1 mile	Turf	Allowance	Allowance Optional Claiming	Gulfstream Park	1.40*	1:33.97	8	4	(4 1/4 lengths)	Rafael Bejarano	Helen Pitts	Midnight Cry Stable	
Feb 24, 2007	4	1 3/8 miles	Turf	Gulfstream Park Breeders' Cup Turf Stakes	G1	Gulfstream Park	3.60	2:12.28	11	3	(1/2 length)	Rafael Bejarano	Helen Pitts	Midnight Cry Stable	
Mar 10, 2007	4	1 1/8 miles	Turf	Mervin H. Muniz Jr. Memorial Handicap	G2	Fair Grounds Race Course	3.40	1:49.57	11	1	1/2 length	Robby Albarado	Helen Pitts	Midnight Cry Stable	
May 5, 2007	4	1 1/8 miles	Turf	Woodford Reserve Turf Classic Stakes	G1	Churchill Downs	2.40*	1:49.01	10	7	(4 1/4 lengths)	Robby Albarado	Helen Pitts	Midnight Cry Stable	
May 19, 2007	4	1 1/8 miles	Turf	Dixie Stakes	G2	Pimlico Race Course	2.60	1:46.36	11	DNF	-	Robby Albarado	Helen Pitts	Midnight Cry Stable	
Jan 11, 2008	5	1 mile	Turf	Allowance	Allowance Optional Claiming	Gulfstream Park	1.70*	1:33.26	9	1	1 length	Edgar Prado	Helen Pitts	Midnight Cry Stable	
Feb 2, 2008	5	1 1/8 miles	Dirt	Donn Handicap	G1	Gulfstream Park	11.70	1:48.35	8	6	(19 1/4 lengths)	Edgar Prado	Helen Pitts	Midnight Cry Stable	
Feb 23, 2008	5	1 3/8 miles	Turf	Gulfstream Park Turf Stakes	G1	Gulfstream Park	3.00	2:12.87	10	1	Neck	Jose Lezcano	Helen Pitts	Midnight Cry Stable	
Apr 11, 2008	5	1 mile	Turf	Maker's Mark Mile Stakes	G1	Keeneland	7.70	1:36.78	10	2	(1 length)	Robby Albarado	Helen Pitts	Cunningham, Patricia and Green, Lessee, Melissa	
May 3, 2008	5	1 1/8 miles	Turf	Woodford Reserve Turf Classic Stakes	G1	Churchill Downs	2.20*	1:50.50	7	1	1 length	Robby Albarado	Helen Pitts	Cunningham, Patricia and Green, Lessee, Melissa	
June 14, 2008	5	1 1/8 miles	Dirt	Stephen Foster Handicap	G1	Churchill Downs	6.00	1:49.68	10	2	(4 1/4 lengths)	Julien Leparoux	Helen Pitts	Cunningham, Patricia and Green, Lessee, Melissa	
July 4, 2008	5	1 mile	Turf	Firecracker Handicap	G2	Churchill Downs	0.50*	1:36.69	5	2	(1 length)	Robby Albarado	Helen Pitts	Cunningham, Patricia and Green, Lessee, Melissa	
Aug 9, 2008	6	1 1/4 miles	Turf	Arlington Million Stakes	G1	Arlington Park	3.20	2:02.17	7	5	(4 1/4 lengths)	Robby Albarado	Helen Pitts	Midnight Cry Stable	
Nov 28, 2008	6	1 1/8 miles	Dirt	Clark Handicap	G2	Churchill Downs	4.90	1:49.79	7	1	1 1/2 length	Julien Leparoux	Helen Pitts	Matthew Garretson (Receiver)	
Jan 31, 2009	6	1 1/8 miles	Dirt	Donn Handicap	G1	Gulfstream Park	3.30	1:50.96	10	3	(5 1/2 lengths)	Julien Leparoux	Helen Pitts	Midnight Cry Stable	
Mar 7, 2009	6	1 1/4 miles	All Weather Synthetic	Santa Anita Handicap	G1	Santa Anita Park	5.00	2:01.93	13	1	1 length	Julien Leparoux	Helen Pitts	Midnight Cry Stable	
May 2, 2009	6	1 1/8 miles	Turf	Woodford Reserve Turf Classic Stakes	G1	Churchill Downs	1.80*	1:49.62	9	1	Head	Julien Leparoux	Helen Pitts	Midnight Cry Stable	
June 13, 2009	6	1 1/8 miles	Dirt	Stephen Foster Handicap	G1	Churchill Downs	1.20*	1:49.75	8	3	(1 length)	Julien Leparoux	Helen Pitts	Midnight Cry Stable	
Aug 8, 2009	7	1 1/4 miles	Turf	Arlington Million Stakes	G1	Arlington Park	3.00	2:04.19	8	5	(8 1/2 lengths)	Julien Leparoux	Helen Pitts	Midnight Cry Stable	
Sep 6, 2009	7	1 1/4 miles	All Weather Synthetic	Pacific Classic Stakes	G1	Del Mar	4.30	2:02.39	12	2	(Neck)	Julien Leparoux	Helen Pitts	Stronach Stables	
Nov 7, 2009	7	1 1/4 miles	All Weather Synthetic	Breeders' Cup Classic	G1	Santa Anita Park	10.40	2:00.62	12	11	(28 3/4 lengths)	Julien Leparoux	Helen Pitts	Stronach Stables	
Nov 27, 2009	7	1 1/8 miles	Dirt	Clark Handicap	G2	Churchill Downs	5.80	1:49.39	14	3	(3/4 lengths)	Rajiv Maragh	Helen Pitts	Stronach Stables	

An asterisk after the odds means Einstein was the post time favorite.

== Stud career ==
Einstein was retired to stand stud at Stronach's Adena Springs farm near Paris, Kentucky for a stud fee of $7,500 in 2010. In 2015, he was moved to Adena Springs' Canada location. He stood at Magali Farms in 2016 and Dealing Ranch in 2017 and 2018. His progeny include graded stakes placed horses Rankhasprivileges, Scholar Athlete, Seeking Albert, and Iranistan.

He was pensioned to Old Friends Thoroughbred Retirement Farm in Georgetown, Kentucky on March 11, 2019. He was euthanized at the age of 18 on October 28, 2020, after suffering complications from cancer.

== Pedigree ==
Pedigree of Einstein (BRZ), bay stallion, 2002
Sire Spend A Buck (USA) 1982	Buckaroo (USA); 1975	Buckpasser	Tom Fool
Sire Spend A Buck (USA) 1982	Buckaroo (USA); 1975	Buckpasser	Busanda
Sire Spend A Buck (USA) 1982	Buckaroo (USA); 1975	Stepping High	No Robbery
Sire Spend A Buck (USA) 1982	Buckaroo (USA); 1975	Stepping High	Bebop
Sire Spend A Buck (USA) 1982	Belle de Jour (USA); 1973	Speak John	Prince John
Sire Spend A Buck (USA) 1982	Belle de Jour (USA); 1973	Speak John	Nuit de Folies
Sire Spend A Buck (USA) 1982	Belle de Jour (USA); 1973	Battle Dress	Jaipur
Sire Spend A Buck (USA) 1982	Belle de Jour (USA); 1973	Battle Dress	Armorial
Dam Gay Charm (BRZ) 1985	Ghadeer (FR); 1978	Lyphard	Northern Dancer
Dam Gay Charm (BRZ) 1985	Ghadeer (FR); 1978	Lyphard	Goofed
Dam Gay Charm (BRZ) 1985	Ghadeer (FR); 1978	Swanhilda	Habitat
Dam Gay Charm (BRZ) 1985	Ghadeer (FR); 1978	Swanhilda	Sweet and Lovely
Dam Gay Charm (BRZ) 1985	Virga (BRZ); 1977	Waldmeister	Wild Risk
Dam Gay Charm (BRZ) 1985	Virga (BRZ); 1977	Waldmeister	Santa Iabel
Dam Gay Charm (BRZ) 1985	Virga (BRZ); 1977	Merry Sunshine	Santa Claus
Dam Gay Charm (BRZ) 1985	Virga (BRZ); 1977	Merry Sunshine	Los Angeles (Family:3-c)
