= Muniz Memorial Classic Stakes =

- Class: Grade II
- Location: Fair Grounds Race Course; New Orleans, Louisiana, United States
- Inaugurated: 1992 (as Explosive Bid Handicap)
- Race type: Thoroughbred - Flat racing
- Website: www.fairgroundsracecourse.com

Race information
- Distance: 1 1/8 miles (9 furlongs)
- Surface: Turf
- Track: Left-handed
- Qualification: Four-years-old and older
- Weight: 124 lbs with allowances
- Purse: $300,000 (since 2014)

Muniz Memorial Classic Stakes is a Grade II American Thoroughbred horse race for horses aged four and older at a distance of one and one-eighth miles on the turf run annually in early March at Fair Grounds Race Course in New Orleans, Louisiana. The event currently offers a purse of $300,000.

== History ==
The inaugural running of the event was on 28 March 1992 as the Explosive Bid Handicap named after the 1984 winner of the Louisiana Handicap, Explosive Bid.

In 1994 the event was run in two split divisions.

In 1996 the American Graded Stakes Committee upgraded the event to Grade III and once more to Grade II in 2001.

In December 2003 the Louisiana Racing Commission agreed to honor Mervyn R. Muniz, Jr., a longtime racing secretary at Fair Grounds Race Course who died in 2003 by renaming the event to the Mervin H. Muniz Jr. Memorial Handicap

There was no race in 2006 due to after effects of Hurricane Katrina which had damaged the Fair Grounds race track and moved the shortened meeting that season to Louisiana Downs.

The 2019 winner of the event Bricks and Mortar continued his successful undefeated season enroute to being crowned US Champion Male Turf Horse and US Horse of the Year.

In 2020 the conditions of the event were changed from handicap to stakes allowance with the name of the race modified to Muniz Memorial Classic Stakes.

== Records ==
Speed record:

- 1:47.21 - Factor This (2020)

Margins:

- 6 lengths - Joyeux Danseur (1998)

Most wins:

- 2 - Proudinsky (GER) (2008, 2009)

Most wins by an owner:

- 3 - Gary A. Tanaka (2001, 2002, 2008)

Most wins by a trainer:

- 3 - Chad C. Brown (2012, 2019, 2024)

Most wins by a jockey:

- 4 - Robby Albarado (1998, 2001, 2004, 2007)

== Winners ==
| Year | Winner | Age | Jockey | Trainer | Owner | Distance | Time | Purse | Grade | Ref |
|---|---|---|---|---|---|---|---|---|---|---|
Muniz Memorial Classic Stakes
| 2026 | Lagynos | 5 | José L. Ortiz | Steven M. Asmussen | HRH Prince Sultan Bin Mishal Al Saud | 1 1/8 miles | 1:48.17 | $294,000 | II | |
| 2025 | Idratherbeblessed | 5 | Ben Curtis | Chris Hartman | JD Thoroughbreds & Wayne Scherr | 1 1/8 miles | 1:50.45 | $300,000 | II | |
| 2024 | I'm Very Busy | 4 | Irad Ortiz Jr. | Chad C. Brown | Team Hanley, Richard Schermerhorn & Paul Braverman | 1 1/8 miles | 1:47.57 | $300,000 | II | |
| 2023 | Spooky Channel | 8 | Joel Rosario | Jason Barkley | NBS Stable | abt. 1 1/8 miles | 1:54.11 | $300,000 | II | |
| 2022 | Two Emmys | 6 | James Graham | Hugh H. Robertson | Wolfe Racing & Hugh H. Robertson | 1 1/8 miles | 1:49.83 | $300,000 | II | |
| 2021 | Colonel Liam | 4 | Irad Ortiz Jr. | Todd A. Pletcher | Lawana L. & Robert E. Low | 1 1/8 miles | 1:48.33 | $300,000 | II | |
| 2020 | Factor This | 5 | Shaun Bridgmohan | Brad H. Cox | Gaining Ground Racing | 1 1/8 miles | 1:47.21 | $300,000 | II | |
Muniz Memorial Handicap
| 2019 | Bricks and Mortar | 5 | Irad Ortiz Jr. | Chad C. Brown | Klaravich Stables Inc. & William Lawrence | abt. 1 1/8 miles | 1:50.44 | $291,000 | II | |
| 2018 | Synchrony | 5 | Joe Bravo | Michael Stidham | Pin Oak Stable | abt. 1 1/8 miles | 1:49.59 | $300,000 | II | |
| 2017 | Enterprising | 6 | Tyler Gaffalione | Michael J. Maker | Maxis Stable | abt. 1 1/8 miles | 1:48.41 | $300,000 | II | |
| 2016 | Take the Stand (ARG) | 5 | Edgar S. Prado | William I. Mott | Earle I. Mack, Wachtel Stable & Brous Stable | abt. 1 1/8 miles | 1:47.80 | $300,000 | II | |
Mervin H. Muniz Jr Memorial Handicap
| 2015 | Chocolate Ride | 5 | Joseph Talamo | Brad H. Cox | John Wentworth | abt. 1 1/8 miles | 1:48.18 | $291,000 | II | |
| 2014 | Skyring | 5 | Joseph Rocco Jr. | D. Wayne Lukas | Calumet Farm | abt. 1 1/8 miles | 1:52.01 | $288,000 | II | |
| 2013 | Amira's Prince (IRE) | 4 | Junior Alvarado | William I. Mott | Wachtel Stable, Eclipse Thoroughbred Partners & Gary Barber | abt. 1 1/8 miles | 1:49.76 | $400,000 | II | |
| 2012 | Casino Host | 4 | John R. Velazquez | Chad C. Brown | Mary & Gary West | abt. 1 1/8 miles | 1:50.87 | $400,000 | II | |
| 2011 | Smart Bid | 5 | Edgar S. Prado | H. Graham Motion | Augustin Stable | abt. 1 1/8 miles | 1:49.97 | $400,000 | II | |
| 2010 | Blues Street | 6 | Javier Castellano | Todd A. Pletcher | Anstu Stable | abt. 1 1/8 miles | 1:50.10 | $300,000 | II | |
| 2009 | Proudinsky (GER) | 6 | Victor Espinoza | Robert J. Frankel | Johanna Louise Glen-Teven | abt. 1 1/8 miles | 1:50.94 | $500,000 | II | |
| 2008 | Proudinsky (GER) | 5 | Garrett K. Gomez | Robert J. Frankel | Gary A. Tanaka | abt. 1 1/8 miles | 1:50.44 | $500,000 | II | |
| 2007 | Einstein (BRZ) | 5 | Robby Albarado | Helen Pitts-Blasi | Midnight Cry Stable | abt. 1 1/8 miles | 1:49.57 | $500,000 | II | |
| 2006 | Race not held | | | | | | | | | |
| 2005 | † A to the Z | 5 | Victor Espinoza | Paula S. Capestro | Andrew & Paula Capestro | abt. 1 1/8 miles | 1:50.99 | $500,000 | II | |
| 2004 | Mystery Giver | 6 | Robby Albarado | Richard R. Scherer | Team Block | abt. 1 1/8 miles | 1:48.29 | $500,000 | II | |
Explosive Bid Handicap
| 2003 | Candid Glen | 6 | Elvis Joseph Perrodin | Andrew Leggio Jr. | Glen C. Warren | abt. 1 1/8 miles | 1:51.15 | $650,000 | II | |
| 2002 | Sarafan | 5 | Corey Nakatani | Neil D. Drysdale | Gary A. Tanaka | abt. 1 1/8 miles | 1:48.88 | $700,000 | II | |
| 2001 | Tijiyr (IRE) | 5 | Robby Albarado | Niall M. O'Callaghan | Gary A. Tanaka | abt. 1 1/8 miles | 1:50.72 | $600,000 | II | |
| 2000 | Brave Act (GB) | 6 | Cash Asmussen | Ron McAnally | Sidney Craig | abt. 1 1/8 miles | 1:48.98 | $600,000 | III | |
| 1999 | Lord Smith (GB) | 4 | Garrett K. Gomez | Bruce L. Jackson | Michael Boich, David & Linda Kruse | abt. 1 1/8 miles | 1:51.27 | $663,600 | III | |
| 1998 | Joyeux Danseur | 5 | Robby Albarado | Albert Stall Jr. | B. Wayne Hughes | abt. 1 1/8 miles | 1:49.30 | $373,300 | III | |
| 1997 | Always a Classic | 4 | Eddie Martin Jr. | Mark R. Frostad | Sam-Son Farm | abt. 1 1/8 miles | 1:54.83 | $219,950 | III | |
| 1996 | Kazabaiyn | 6 | Kent J. Desormeaux | Robert B. Hess Jr. | Jeremys Stable, et al | abt. 1 1/8 miles | 1:50.80 | $155,325 | III | |
| 1995 | Earl of Barking (IRE) | 5 | Goncalino Almeida | Richard J. Cross | Henry E. Pabst | abt. 1 1/8 miles | 1:52.01 | $155,625 | Listed | |
| 1994 | Pride of Summer | 6 | Robert King Jr. | Anthony J. Bizelia | TOC Stable, Patrick J. Purcell, et al | abt. 1 1/8 miles | 1:49.59 | $127,375 | Listed | Division 1 |
| 1994 | Snake Eyes | 4 | Brent E. Bartram | Steven L. Morguelan | Melvin Isenstein | abt. 1 1/8 miles | 1:49.41 | $127,170 | Listed | Division 2 |
| 1993 | Coaxing Matt | 4 | Eddie Martin Jr. | Neil L. Pessin | Elmer E. Miller | abt. 1 1/8 miles | 1:50.80 | $78,350 | Listed | |
| 1992 | ‡ Slick Groom | 4 | Kirk Paul LeBlanc | Donald J. Cormier Sr. | Albert Pusch | abt. 1 1/8 miles | 1:52.60 | $52,650 | Listed | |

Notes:
† In the 2005 running of the event longshot Rapid Proof was first past the post. However, after a positive test for dexamethasone Rapid Proof was disqualified, and A to the Z was declared the winner with all prizemoney redistributed according to the adjusted finishing order
‡ In the 1992 inaugural running, City Ballet was first past the post but was disqualified and place sixth for interference in the straight and Slick Groom was declared the winner.

== See also ==
- List of American and Canadian Graded races
