= Yagli (horse) =

American-bred Thoroughbred racehorse

- Sire: Jade Hunter
- Grandsire: Mr. Prospector
- Dam: Nijinsky's Best
- Damsire: Nijinsky
- Sex: Stallion
- Foaled: 1993
- Country: United States
- Colour: Chestnut
- Breeder: Allen E. Paulson
- Owner: Allen E. Paulson
- Trainer: William I. Mott
- Record: 27: 10-6-3
- Earnings: US$1,702,121

Major wins
- Dixie Stakes (1998); Bernard Baruch Handicap (1998); Hialeah Turf Cup Handicap (1998); Gulfstream Park Breeders' Cup Handicap (1999); United Nations Handicap (1999); Manhattan Handicap (1999)

Yagli (foaled in 1993 in Kentucky) is a retired American Thoroughbred racehorse. He was bred and raced by prominent horseman and CEO of Gulfstream Aerospace Allen Paulson, who also owned U.S. Racing Hall of Fame inductee, Cigar, European Horse of the Year and winner of the 1991 Breeders' Cup Juvenile Arazi, as well as 2002 American Horse of the Year Azeri, among others.

A colt who developed late, Yagli began racing at age three but did not meet with much success until age five in 1998 when he won three Graded stakes races including the Hialeah Turf Cup Handicap and finished second in the Breeders' Cup Turf. The following year, he won three Grade I races at age six in 1999.

Paulson died in July 2000, and Yagli was sold by the estate to a stud farm in Brazil.

Pedigree of Yagli
Sire Jade Hunter	Mr. Prospector	Raise a Native	Native Dancer
Sire Jade Hunter	Mr. Prospector	Raise a Native	Raise You
Sire Jade Hunter	Mr. Prospector	Gold Digger	Nashua
Sire Jade Hunter	Mr. Prospector	Gold Digger	Sequence
Sire Jade Hunter	Jadana	Pharly	Lyphard
Sire Jade Hunter	Jadana	Pharly	Comely
Sire Jade Hunter	Jadana	Janina	Match II
Sire Jade Hunter	Jadana	Janina	Jennifer
Dam Nijinsky's Best	Nijinsky	Northern Dancer	Nearctic
Dam Nijinsky's Best	Nijinsky	Northern Dancer	Natalma
Dam Nijinsky's Best	Nijinsky	Flaming Page	Bull Page
Dam Nijinsky's Best	Nijinsky	Flaming Page	Flaring Top
Dam Nijinsky's Best	Best In Show	Traffic Judge	Alibhai
Dam Nijinsky's Best	Best In Show	Traffic Judge	Traffic Court
Dam Nijinsky's Best	Best In Show	Stolen Hour	Mr. Busher
Dam Nijinsky's Best	Best In Show	Stolen Hour	Late Date
