= Julien Leparoux =

French Eclipse Award winning jockey (born 1983)

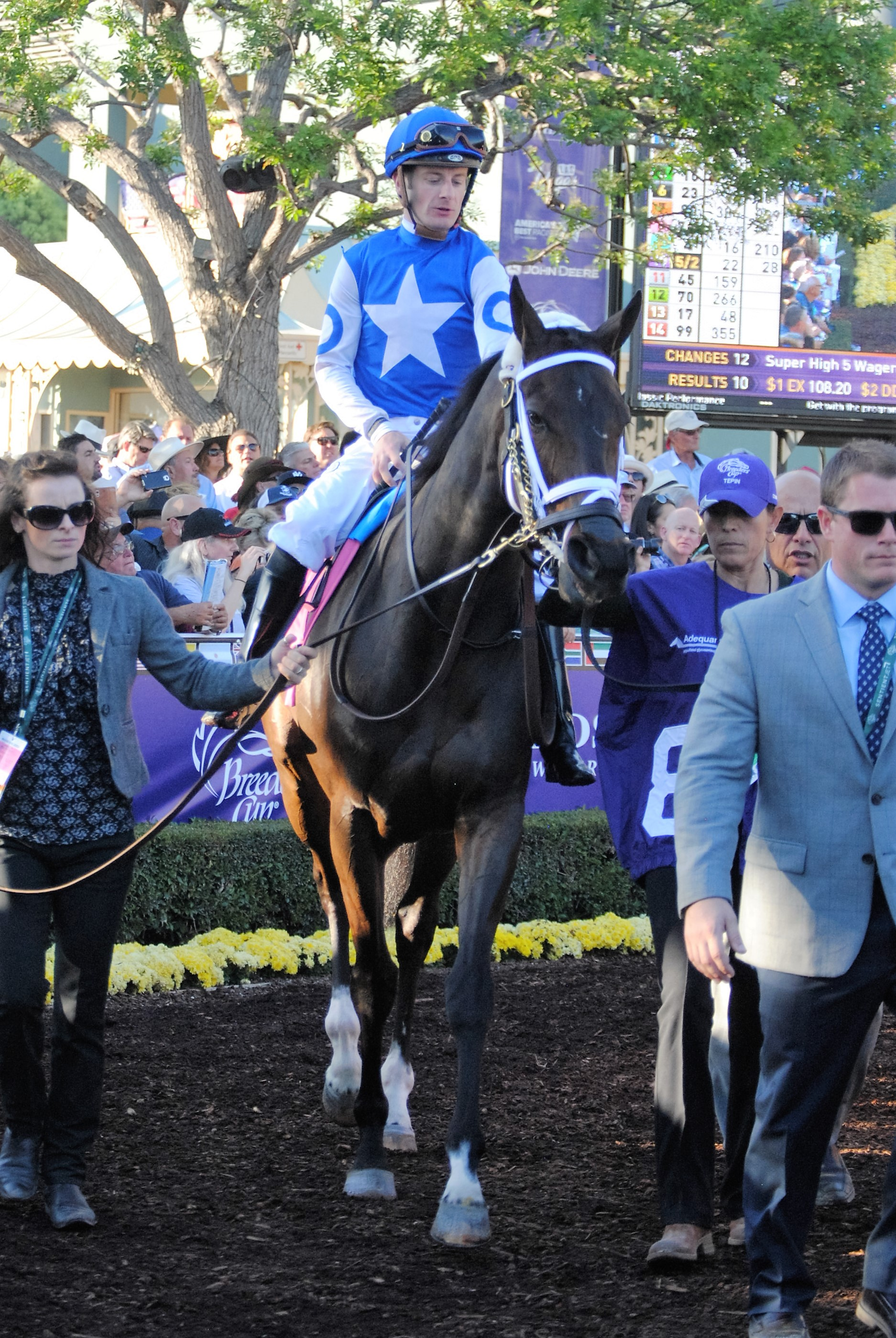
- Leparoux on Tepin in 2016

Personal information
- Born: July 15, 1983 (age 43) Senlis, Oise, France
- Occupation: Jockey

Horse racing career
- Sport: Horse racing
- Career wins: 3,000 (As of November 28, 2024) (ongoing)

Major racing wins
- Grade I Stakes Wins: Just A Game Handicap (2006, 2015) First Lady Stakes (2006, 2008, 2011, 2013, 2015) Spinster Stakes (2006, 2007) Beverly D. Stakes (2006) Secretariat Stakes (2007) American Oaks (2008) Diana (2008, 2009) Santa Anita Handicap (2009) Jenny Wiley Stakes (2009, 2013, 2016) Turf Classic Stakes (2009) Humana Distaff Handicap (2009) Flower Bowl Invitational Handicap (2009) Thoroughbred Club of America Stakes (2009) Personal Ensign Stakes (2009) Maker's Mark Mile (2010) Carter Handicap (2010) Champagne Stakes (2011) Florida Derby (2011) Blue Grass Stakes (2013) Test Stakes (2013) Del Mar Oaks (2013) Del Mar Futurity (2013) QEII Challenge Cup (2013) Alcibiades Stakes (2014) Acorn Stakes (2016) Breeders' Futurity Stakes (2016); Breeders' Cup wins: Breeders' Cup Juvenile Turf (2007); Breeders' Cup Filly & Mare Turf (2008); Breeders' Cup Juvenile Fillies (2009); Breeders' Cup Filly & Mare Sprint (2009); Breeders' Cup Dirt Mile (2009); Breeders' Cup Mile (2015); Breeders' Cup Juvenile (2016) International wins: Woodbine Mile (2011, 2016); Queen Anne Stakes (2016); Queen's Plate (2016)

Racing awards
- United States Champion Jockey by wins (2006); United States Champion Apprentice Jockey (2006); Eclipse Award for Outstanding Jockey (2009)

Honours
- George Woolf Memorial Jockey Award (2026)

Significant horses
- Classic Empire, Nownownow, Einstein, Forever Together, She Be Wild, Informed Decision, Tepin

Julien R. Leparoux (born July 15, 1983, in Senlis, Oise, France) is a French Eclipse Award winning jockey currently racing in the United States. He has won seven Breeders' Cup races, including the 2015 Breeders' Cup Mile with Champion Turf Mare Tepin and the 2016 Breeders' Cup Juvenile with Classic Empire.

In 2026 Leparoux was voted the prestigious George Woolf Memorial Jockey Award. A national honour, it has been presented annually since 1950 by Santa Anita Park in Arcadia, California to recognize a Thoroughbred racing jockey in North America who demonstrates high standards of personal and professional conduct both on and off the racetrack.

== Background ==
Leparoux grew up in a racing family, the son of Robert Leparoux, a jockey turned assistant trainer. He worked at the Chantilly Racecourse as a stable hand and in January 2003 emigrated to California to work as an exercise rider for fellow Frenchman, trainer Patrick Biancone. In 2005, he became an apprentice jockey.

Leparoux is known as a finesse rider. "I just try not to fight so much with my horses," he said in a 2012 interview. "I try to be gentle around their mouths."

=== Family ===
In December 2012, Julien married Shea Mitchell who, like Julien, is the child of a racehorse trainer. During one of the races that Shea attended, Julien fell off and broke his hand. Later that week, Shea tweeted at Julien a simple "I hope you're ok". Not long after, they got married. Shea tweeted a picture of Julien and her father with the caption "2007, when Julien rode On the Acorn for dad. He probably never guessed he was looking @ his future son in law". On September 24, 2015, their first son, Mitchell Leparoux, was born. At only 4 days old, Mitchell was out at Keeneland watching his dad warm up horses in the early morning and racing during the day!

== Racing career ==
Leparoux embarked on his professional riding career in the summer of 2005 at Saratoga Race Course where he earned his first win on July 26 on Easter Guardian. He finished the Saratoga meet with 28 wins, the most in track history by an apprentice. In 2006 he was also the leading winning jockey during the Turfway Park winter/spring meet, Churchill Downs spring/summer meet, and Keeneland Race Course spring meet (where he tied with Rafael Bejarano).

For 2006, Julien Leparoux won 403 races to lead all jockeys in the United States. His total wins and earnings of $12,491,316 for the year were the most by an apprentice jockey in racing history. He was voted the 2006 Eclipse Award for Outstanding Apprentice Jockey. He was also the subject of the Eclipse Award-winning photograph, which showed him being unseated when the filly Sanibel Storm ducked into the rail in the stretch at Keeneland. Leparoux somersaulted over her head and landed in the infield: both he and the filly were unhurt.

Leparoux "lost the bug" in September 2006, referring to the five-pound weight allowance an apprentice (bug) jockey is given. Despite this, Leparoux continued winning riding titles, including Turfway's winter/spring meet, Keeneland's spring meet and Churchill Downs' spring/summer meet. On June 27, 2007, Leparoux became only the fifth jockey in the 133-year history of Churchill Downs to ride six winners on a single card.

On November 11, 2008, he rode seven winners on a single racecard at Churchill Downs, tying a twenty-four-year-old record set by Pat Day on June 20, 1984.

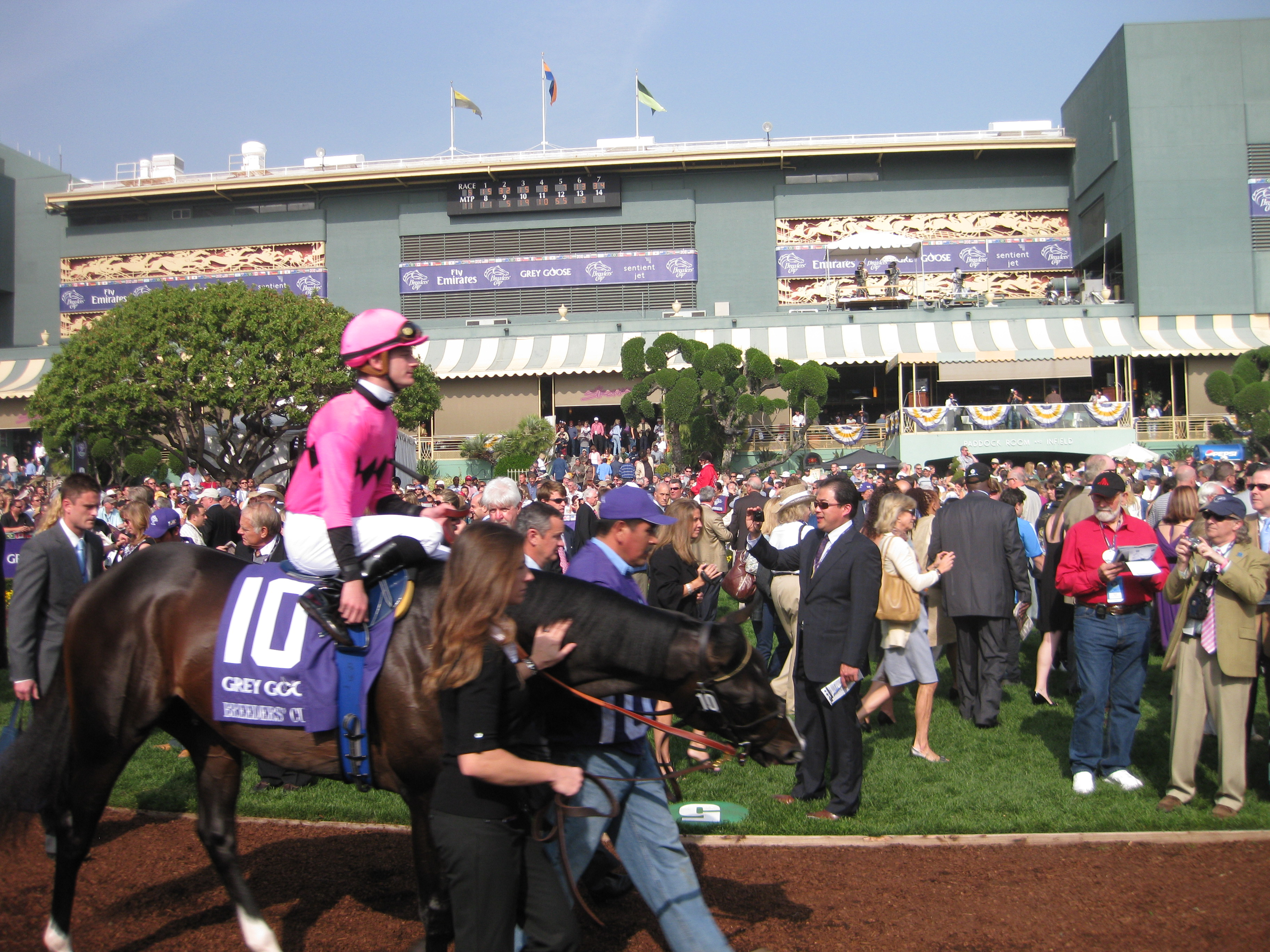
Julien Leparoux at the 2009 Breeders' Cup

Leparoux had a career best year in 2009, capped by wins in the Breeders' Cup Dirt Mile on Furthest Land, the Filly & Mare Sprint on Informed Decision and the Juvenile Fillies on She Be Wild. He won the Shoemaker Award as the winningest jockey at the 2009 Breeders' Cup, being only the 2nd jockey in history to win three Breeders' Cup races in a single year, following Garrett Gomez. He led the North American earnings list and received the Eclipse Award for Outstanding Jockey in 2009. He was only the fourth jockey to win Eclipse Awards as both an apprentice and journeyman.

In 2012, Leparoux decided to switch from the Kentucky circuit (Churchill Downs, Keeneland and Turfway Park) to New York, then moved to California to be closer to his then-fiancée's family. At the end of 2013, now married, he moved back to Kentucky. "I wanted to come back here for my career, the same routine I was used to," explained Leparoux. "I'm still young where I want to be at the top and ride a lot of races and try to win as much as I can... And we want to start a family, and I think Kentucky is a great place. It requires a lot of moving around for a family, but a lot of jockeys do it."

Leparoux had one of his best chances to win the Kentucky Derby in 2012 with the talented colt Union Rags but could only finish seventh after a troubled trip. Leparoux told the horse's trainer that he had heard a pop (indicative of a possible injury) with three-eighths of a mile remaining in the race, but no problem was found the day after. The trainer called the race a disaster and replaced Leparoux for the Belmont Stakes with John Velazquez. Union Rags won the Belmont but never raced again due to an injury to his suspensory ligament.

The highlights of 2016 included several notable wins on Tepin, including the Queen Anne Stakes at Royal Ascot in June. Leparoux was also invited to ride Sir Dudley Digges in Canada's most prestigious event, the Queen's Plate at Woodbine racetrack on July 3. He rode in 11 races at Churchill Downs the day before the race, then flew to Toronto with only a few hours of sleep and won at odds of 16–1. Leparoux rode Classic Empire to victory in the Breeders' Cup Juvenile.

=== Keeneland statistics ===
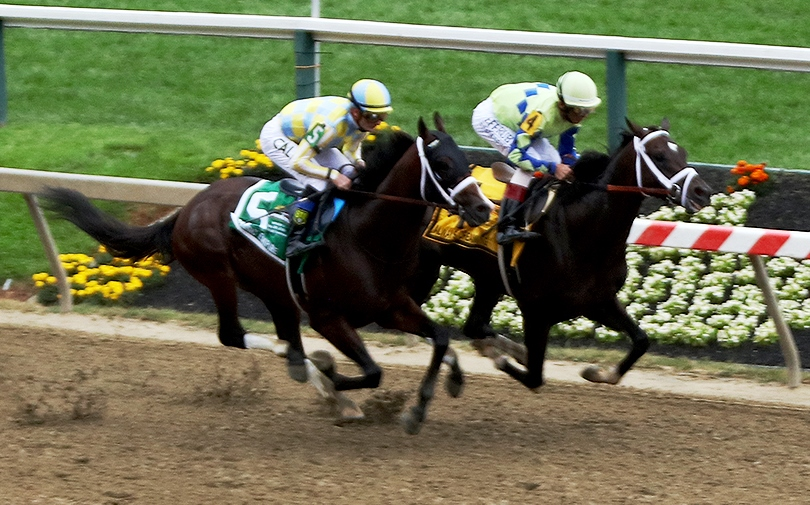
Leparoux on Classic Empire (left) in the 2017 Preakness Stakes

Leparoux is a regular rider at the Keeneland spring and fall race meetings and has achieved a number of milestones at the track. As of April 2016, he has:

- Tied for fourth by stakes wins (52) and fifth by total wins (403).
- Won the leading rider title 10 times.
- Won the 2015 Breeders' Cup Mile (G1) on Tepin on Oct. 31.
- Won six races on a 10-race card on April 20, 2012, tying Craig Perret and Randy Romero for the most wins on a single card.

== Year-end charts ==
North American Rank
Year	by wins	by earnings
2006	1	8
2007	12	10
2008	29	11
2009	13	3
2010	39	7
2011	11	6
2012	39	7
2013	65	16
2014	64	23
2015	59	12
2016	38	7
2017	58	9
2018		21
2019		17
2020		23
2021		27
