= Irad Ortiz Jr. =

Puerto Rican jockey (born 1992)

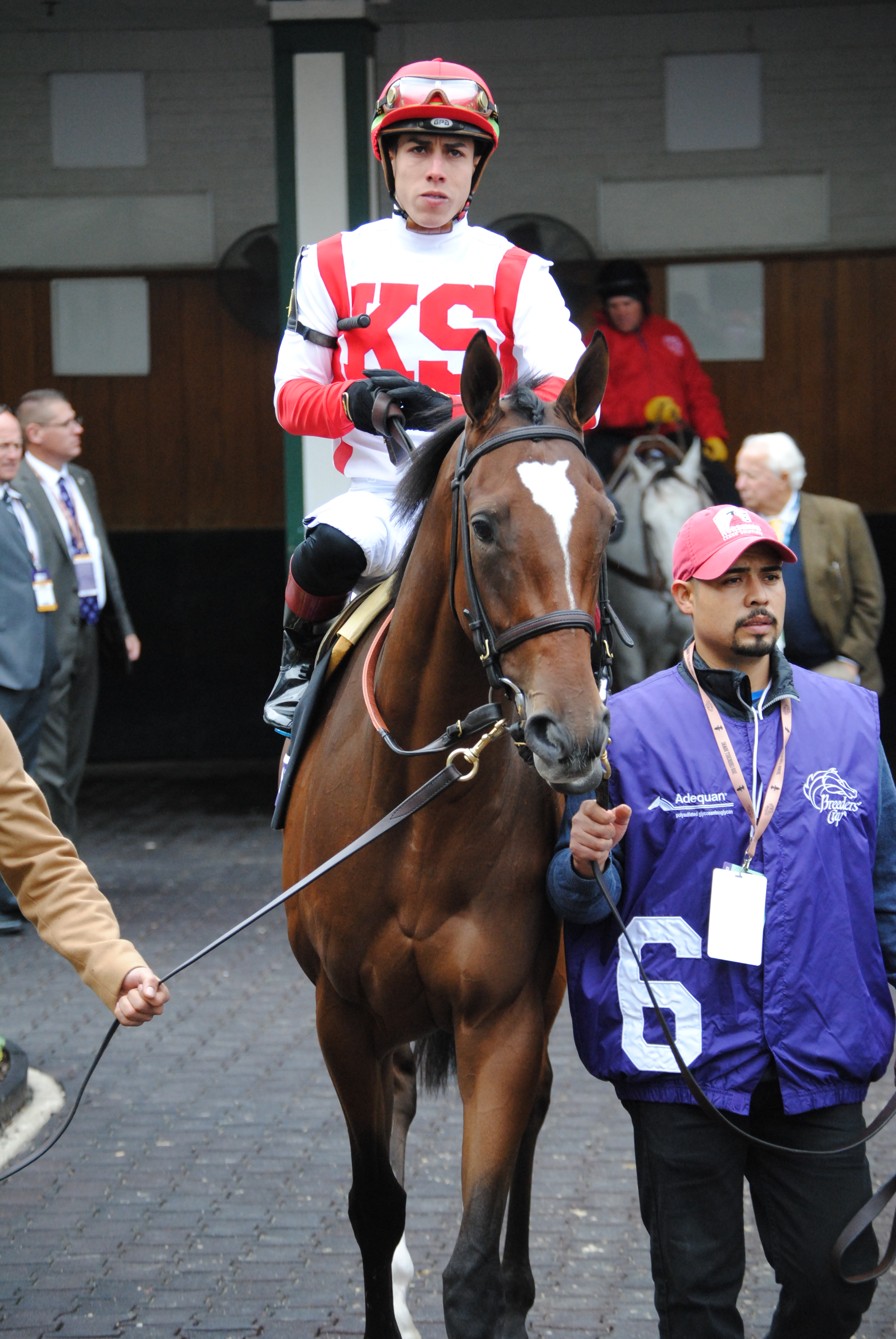
- Ortiz at the 2018 Breeders' Cup

Personal information
- Born: August 11, 1992 (age 34) Trujillo Alto, Puerto Rico
- Occupation: Jockey
- Website: www.theortizbrothers.com

Horse racing career
- Sport: Horse racing
- Career wins: 4142+ (ongoing)

Major racing wins
- Coaching Club American Oaks (2012 ,2022); Wonder Again Stakes (2014, 2015, 2024); Bed O' Roses Stakes (2018,2023,2024); Woody Stephens Stakes (2015, 2024); Muniz Memorial Classic Stakes (2019, 2021, 2024); Pennsylvania Derby (2012, 2019); Alfred G. Vanderbilt Handicap (2012, 2023); Alabama Stakes (2012, 2022); Beaugay Stakes (2016, 2018, 2019, 2023); Derby City Distaff Stakes (2024); Ballerina Handicap (2022); Beldame Stakes (2022); Carter Handicap (2013, 2021); Hopeful Stakes (2022); Saratoga Derby Invitational Stakes (2020); Madison Stakes (2023); Personal Ensign Stakes (2021); Jaipur Stakes (2017, 2018, 2024); Jenny Wiley Stakes (2023); Coolmore Turf Mile Stakes (2022); Frizette Stakes (2022); H. Allen Jerkens Memorial Stakes (2013, 2023); Champagne Stakes (2013, 2017); King's Bishop Stakes (2013, 2023); Test Stakes (2014, 2015); Acorn Stakes (2014); Belmont Oaks Invitational Stakes (2015, 2022); Flower Bowl Stakes (2015, 2016, 2018, 2022); Manhattan Stakes (2015, 2019, 2020, 2023); Spinster Stakes (2015, 2021); Diana Stakes (2016, 2017); Spinaway Stakes (2016, 2017, 2019, 2023); Beverly D. Stakes (2017); Gamely Stakes (2017); Jockey Club Gold Cup (2017, 2020); Just a Game Stakes (2018, 2020, 2023); Whitney Stakes (2018, 2020, 2022, 2023); Arlington Million (2018, 2019); Pegasus World Cup Turf (2019, 2021, 2022, 2023); Turf Classic Stakes (2019, 2021, 2023); Summer Stakes (2019); Natalma Stakes (2019); Pegasus World Cup (2020, 2022, 2025); Troy Stakes (2022); Hollywood Derby (2020); Florida Derby (2021, 2023); Maker's Mark Mile Stakes (2021); Carter Handicap (2021); Apple Blossom Handicap (2021); Hudson Stakes (NYB) (2021, 2022); Remsen Stakes (2021); Hollywood Gold Cup Stakes (2022); Shoemaker Mile Stakes (2022); New York Stakes (2022); Woodward Stakes (2022) American Classics / Breeders' Cup wins: Belmont Stakes (2016, 2022); Breeders' Cup Juvenile Fillies Turf (2014, 2018); Breeders' Cup Turf Sprint (2015); Breeders' Cup Filly and Mare Turf (2015); Breeders' Cup Sprint (2020, 2023); Breeders' Cup Filly & Mare Sprint (2017, 2018, 2022, 2023); Breeders' Cup Juvenile Turf Sprint (2019, 2020, 2021, 2025); Breeders' Cup Dirt Mile (2019. 2021); Breeders' Cup Turf (2019); Breeders' Cup Classic (2019, 2023)

Racing awards
- Eclipse Award for Outstanding Jockey (2018, 2019, 2020, 2022, 2023); Shoemaker Award (2018, 2019, 2020,2021)

Significant horses
- Bar of Gold, Bricks and Mortar, Creator, Goodnight Olive, Lady Eli, Mo Donegal, Newspaperofrecord, Questing, Shamrock Rose, Spun to Run, Stephanie's Kitten, Vino Rosso, Whitmore, White Abarrio, Elite Power, Renegade
- Updated on January 27, 2020

Irad Ortiz Jr. (born August 11, 1992) is a Puerto Rican jockey who has been a leading rider in the New York Thoroughbred horse racing circuit since 2012. He won his first Breeders' Cup race on Lady Eli in 2014, and his first American Classic on Creator in the 2016 Belmont Stakes. He won the 2022 Belmont Stakes on Mo Donegal.

Ortiz won the Eclipse Award for Outstanding Jockey in 2018 after leading the jockey list by both number of wins and earnings. He had four winners at the 2019 Breeders' Cup event, including wins in both the $4 million Turf and the $6 million Classic. In 2019, Ortiz repeated the Eclipse Award by leading in both wins and second places, as well as establishing a single-year earnings record for North American horse racing of $34,109,019. He won his third straight Eclipse Award in 2020 after again finishing first on both the earnings and wins list.

== Personal life ==
Ortiz was born in Trujillo Alto, Puerto Rico. His grandfather, also named Irad Ortiz, was a jockey, as was uncle Iván Ortiz. His younger brother, José Ortiz, is also a leading jockey in New York. "We support each other, but you know, when we go out there, we are jockeys," said José.

Growing up, one of his idols was Ángel Cordero Jr., the first Puerto Rican jockey to be inducted into the National Museum of Racing and Hall of Fame. At age 16, Ortiz enrolled in Puerto Rico's Escuela Vocacional Hípica, a school for prospective jockeys.

Ortiz has a daughter, Sarai, born in 2015.

== Career ==
Ortiz began his professional riding career at Hipódromo Camarero in Puerto Rico on New Year's Day, 2011, winning 76 of 357 starts over the following months. In June, Pito Rosa, who works in the NYRA jockeys' room and was an old friend of Ortiz's grandfather, encouraged Ortiz to come to New York. Rosa also found an agent for Ortiz and acted as a mentor while Ortiz was settling in. Ortiz rode his first race at Belmont Park on June 17 and won his first American race on June 24 aboard Millennium Jet. He would finish the year with 151 wins from 1,016 starts.

In February 2012, Ortiz "lost his bug", meaning he was no longer an apprentice and lost the weight allowance given to one. Even so, his success continued. In June 2012, Ortiz got his big break when trainer Kiaran McLaughlin put him on the filly Questing in an allowance race. When the filly won, McLaughlin retained Ortiz for the Coaching Club American Oaks at Saratoga in what would become Ortiz's first Grade 1 victory. Ortiz and Questing would also win the Alabama Stakes, and Questing would earn the Eclipse Award for champion 3-year-old filly. Ortiz finished the year ranked #17 in North America by earnings. He finished second in the Eclipse Award voting for Outstanding Apprentice Jockey; his loss may have been due to spending the majority of the year as a journeyman rider.

In 2013, Ortiz won 224 races and vaulted to the #5 ranking in North America by earnings. Highlights included wins in the King's Bishop Stakes, Champagne Stakes and Carter Handicap. He took his first riding title during Aqueduct's 2012-13 inner track meet.

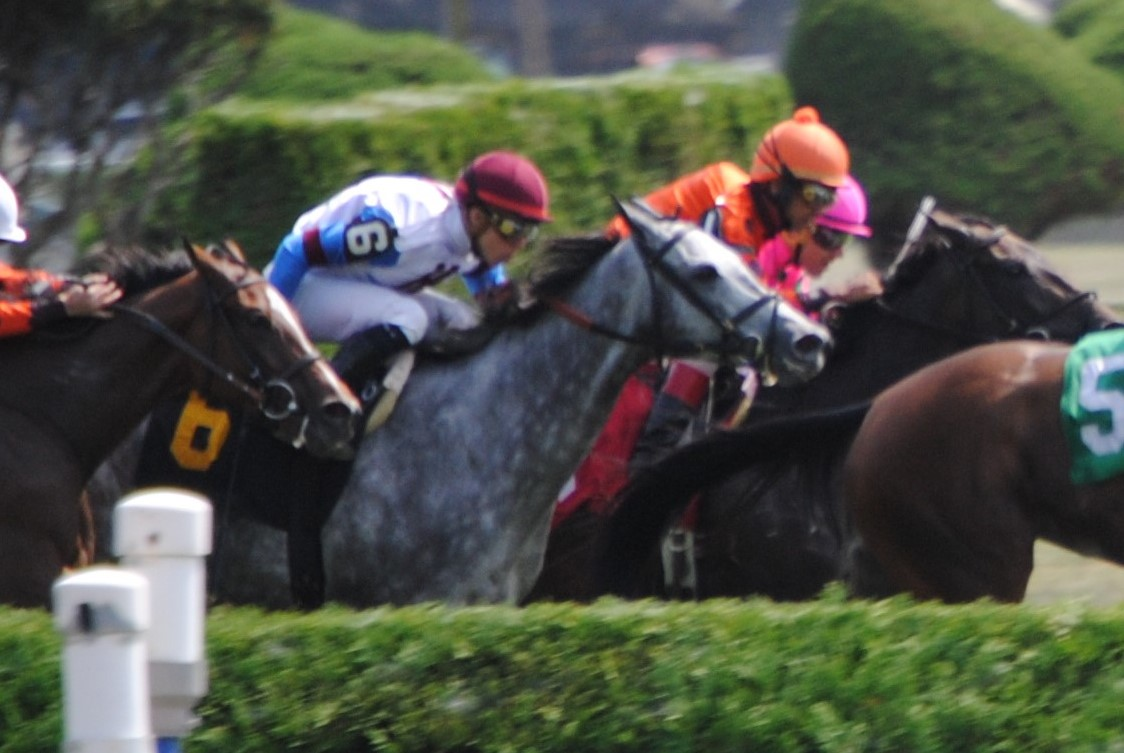
Ortiz, on the gray, at Saratoga 2015

In 2014, Ortiz won 15 graded stakes including his first victory at the Breeders' Cup in the Juvenile Fillies Turf aboard Lady Eli. He tied Javier Castellano for the leading rider title (by number of wins) at Belmont Park's spring meet, then won the title outright for the fall meet. For the year, Ortiz finished third in North America by earnings.

In 2015, he rode Stephanie's Kitten to a win in the Breeders' Cup Filly & Mare Turf and Lady Shipman to victory in the Turf Sprint. He was the leading jockey at the Belmont Fall 2015 meeting. Ortiz had his 1,000th North American victory on November 22, 2015, aboard Island Therapy at Aqueduct. He finished second in the North American jockey standings by earnings.

In 2016, Ortiz was unanimously voted the Jockeys' Guild Jockey of the Week for June 6 – 12. Ortiz began the weekend by winning the Jersey Girl Stakes, New York Stakes and Easy Goer Stakes. He then gained his fourth stakes victory of the week by winning his first American Classic in the 2016 Belmont Stakes on Creator. "I thought Irad did a masterful job with all of his decisions," said Creator's trainer, Steve Asmussen. "He saved enough ground going into the first turn and stayed inside, and that gave us a chance to win." He again finished second in the North American jockey standings.

In 2017, Ortiz finished third in the jockey standings by earnings and first by number of wins. He was an Eclipse Award finalist along with his brother José, who won.

In 2018, he won the Eclipse Award for Outstanding Jockey after leading the jockey list by both number of wins and earnings. He won the Belmont spring/summer and Saratoga meets, the latter highlighted by a win in the Whitney Handicap on Diversify. He earned his 2,000th career win on September 15 aboard Gambler's Fallacy at Belmont Park. He won the Shoemaker Award for outstanding jockey at the 2018 Breeders' Cup after he won two races, the Juvenile Fillies Turf with Newspaperofrecord and the Filly & Mare Sprint with Shamrock Rose, plus scoring five more top four finishes.

Ortiz experienced a slowdown in business in the fall of 2019, finishing just ninth in the Belmont meet standings. However, he had an exceptional weekend at the 2019 Breeders' Cup with four winners, including Bricks and Mortar in the $4 million Turf and Vino Rosso in the $6 million Classic. "Some riders have a good rapport with certain horses," said trainer Todd Pletcher. "Irad and Vino Rosso really gelled, you could see there was great chemistry there from the first time he got on him." He finished the year ranked first by number of wins and earnings, and received his second Eclipse Award.

In 2020, Ortiz earned his third consecutive Eclipse Award, with highlights including a win in the Breeders' Cup Sprint with Whitmore. On June 3, 2021, he was hospitalized after he was thrown when his mount stumbled in a maiden race at Belmont Park after moving to the lead. Ortiz was struck by one of the trailing horses but the CT scans and X-rays came back clean.

On August 1, 2024, at the Saratoga's seventh turf race, the New York State Gaming Commission imposed a three NYRA racing days suspension, August 14–16, upon Ortiz Jr. It disqualified his mount On a Spree in obstructing Complete Agenda's path at the top of the stretch.

In 2025, at Tampa Bay Downs's Pasco Stakes, DRF reported that the stewards imposed a three racing days suspension, January 19, 22, and 23 upon Ortiz Jr. who was found guilty of foul riding. It disqualified his mount Owen Almighty from his one-length victory in obstructing Rookie Card's path near the three-eighths pole.

In 2026, Ortiz rode Renegade to a 2nd-place finish in the 2026 Kentucky Derby, losing out on first place to his brother José Ortiz, riding Golden Tempo.

=== Year-end rankings ===
Year	Rank by earnings	Rank by wins
2011	97	53
2012	17	56
2013	5	10
2014	3	3
2015	2	4
2016	2	3
2017	3	1
2018	1	1
2019	1	1
2020	1	1
2021	2	1
2022	1	1
