= Badge of Silver =

American thoroughbred racehorse

- Breed: Thoroughbred
- Sire: Silver Deputy
- Grandsire: Deputy Minister
- Dam: Silveroo
- Damsire: Silver Hawk
- Sex: Stallion
- Foaled: 2000
- Country: USA
- Color: Dark Bay/Brown
- Breeder: Liberation FM, Oratis TBS, Trackside FM
- Owner: Ken & Sarah Ramsey
- Trainer: Ronald W. Werner; Robert J. Frankel
- Record: 16:7-4-1
- Earnings: $1,047,892

Major wins
- Risen Star Stakes (2003); Hal's Hope Stakes (2005); New Orleans Handicap (2005); San Gabriel Handicap (2006)

Badge of Silver (foaled March 25, 2000) is an American Thoroughbred racehorse, winner of the 2006 San Gabriel Handicap.

== Career ==
Badge of Silver ran his first race on April 12, 2002, at Keeneland.

He continued winning, by taking the 2003 Risen Star Stakes.

On January 8, 2005, he captured the Hal's Hope Stakes and then followed it with a win at the 2005 New Orleans Handicap.

His last major win came on January 1, 2006, at the San Gabriel Handicap.

His final race was at the 2006 Cigar Mile Handicap, where he placed in second.

== Stud career ==
Badge of Silver's descendants include:

c = colt, f = filly

Foaled	Name	Sex	Major Wins
2008	King Congie	c	Tropical Park Derby
2008	Silver Medallion	c	Fort Lauderdale Stakes, Tropical Turf Handicap, El Camino Real Derby, Eddie Logan Stakes
2008	Fly Lexis Fly	c	Derby Nacional
2008	Sparkling Style	c	Alphabet Kisses Stakes, Warren's Thoroughbreds Stakes
2009	Silver Max	c	Wise Dan Stakes, Shadwell Turf Mile Stakes, Bernard Baruch Handicap, Oceanport Stakes, Virginia Derby, American Turf Stakes, Transylvania Stakes
2011	Bigger Picture	c	Dixiana Elkhorn Stakes, John B. Connally Turf Cup, United Nations Stakes, Red Smith Handicap Wise Dan Stakes

== Pedigree ==
Pedigree of Badge of Silver (USA), 2005
Sire Silver Deputy (CAN) 1985	Deputy Minister (CAN); 1979	Vice Regent	Northern Dancer
Sire Silver Deputy (CAN) 1985	Deputy Minister (CAN); 1979	Vice Regent	Victoria Regina
Sire Silver Deputy (CAN) 1985	Deputy Minister (CAN); 1979	Mint Copy	Bunty's Flight
Sire Silver Deputy (CAN) 1985	Deputy Minister (CAN); 1979	Mint Copy	Shakney
Sire Silver Deputy (CAN) 1985	Silver Valley (USA); 1979	Mr. Prospector	Raise a Native
Sire Silver Deputy (CAN) 1985	Silver Valley (USA); 1979	Mr. Prospector	Gold Digger
Sire Silver Deputy (CAN) 1985	Silver Valley (USA); 1979	Seven Valleys	Road At Sea
Sire Silver Deputy (CAN) 1985	Silver Valley (USA); 1979	Seven Valleys	Proud Pied
Dam Silveroo (USA) 1992	Silver Hawk (USA); 1979	Roberto	Hail to Reason
Dam Silveroo (USA) 1992	Silver Hawk (USA); 1979	Roberto	Bramalea
Dam Silveroo (USA) 1992	Silver Hawk (USA); 1979	Gris Vitesse	Amerigo
Dam Silveroo (USA) 1992	Silver Hawk (USA); 1979	Gris Vitesse	Matchiche
Dam Silveroo (USA) 1992	Hey Mama (USA); 1977	High Tribune	Prince John
Dam Silveroo (USA) 1992	Hey Mama (USA); 1977	High Tribune	En Casserole
Dam Silveroo (USA) 1992	Hey Mama (USA); 1977	Pat's Mama	Hospitality
Dam Silveroo (USA) 1992	Hey Mama (USA); 1977	Pat's Mama	Momamamu
