= Silver Max =

American-bred Thoroughbred racehorse

- Sire: Badge of Silver
- Grandsire: Silver Deputy
- Dam: Kissin Rene
- Damsire: Kissin Kris
- Sex: Stallion
- Foaled: 2009
- Country: USA
- Breeder: Steve C. Snowden, Seth & Will Lauffer
- Owner: Mark Bacon & Dana Wells
- Trainer: Dale L. Romans
- Record: 27:12-5-1
- Earnings: $1,954,738

Major wins
- American Turf Stakes (2012); Arlington Classic Stakes (2012); Commonwealth Derby (2012); Transylvania Stakes (2012); Bernard Baruch Handicap (2013); Oceanport Stakes (2013); Opening Verse Stakes (2013); Shadwell Turf Mile Stakes (2013); Firecracker Stakes (2014)

Silver Max (foaled March 8, 2009) is an American Thoroughbred racehorse and the winner of the 2013 Shadwell Turf Mile Stakes.

== Career ==
Silver Max 's first race was on July 31, 2011, at Saratoga, where he came in second. He did not pick up his first win until January 13, 2012, at Gulfstream Park.

He went on a six race win streak starting on March 9, 2012. He won the Transylvania Stakes in April. He then won the American Turf Stakes on May 4, then the Arlington Classic Stakes on May 25. He picked up a win at the Oliver Stakes on June 13, then capped off the streak with a win at the 2012 Commonwealth Derby on July 21.

His next graded race win came a year later as he won the Oceanport Stakes on July 28, 2013. Silver Max then won the Bernard Baruch Handicap on August 31, 2013. Then on October 5, 2013, he won the biggest race of his career when he captured his first Grade-1 win - the Shadwell Turf Mile Stakes.

2014 was his final season. His only win was at the June 28th, 2014 Firecracker Stakes. He failed to place on the podium in his last three races and finished his career off with a 6th-place finish in the November 8th, 2014 River City Handicap.

In 2015, Silver Max was retired to stud.

In 2020, Silver Max was retired to Old Friends in Georgetown, Kentucky.

== Pedigree ==
Pedigree of Silver Max (USA), 2009
Sire Badge of Silver (USA) 2000	Silver Deputy (CAN); 1985	Deputy Minister	Vice Regent
Sire Badge of Silver (USA) 2000	Silver Deputy (CAN); 1985	Deputy Minister	Mint Copy
Sire Badge of Silver (USA) 2000	Silver Deputy (CAN); 1985	Silver Valley	Mr. Prospector
Sire Badge of Silver (USA) 2000	Silver Deputy (CAN); 1985	Silver Valley	Seven Valleys
Sire Badge of Silver (USA) 2000	Silveroo (USA); 1992	Silver Hawk	Roberto
Sire Badge of Silver (USA) 2000	Silveroo (USA); 1992	Silver Hawk	Gris Vitesse
Sire Badge of Silver (USA) 2000	Silveroo (USA); 1992	Hey Mama	High Tribute
Sire Badge of Silver (USA) 2000	Silveroo (USA); 1992	Hey Mama	Pat's Mama
Dam Kissin Rene (USA) 1997	Kissin Kris (USA); 1990	Kris S.	Roberto
Dam Kissin Rene (USA) 1997	Kissin Kris (USA); 1990	Kris S.	Sharp Queen
Dam Kissin Rene (USA) 1997	Kissin Kris (USA); 1990	Toes Forward	Your Alibhai
Dam Kissin Rene (USA) 1997	Kissin Kris (USA); 1990	Toes Forward	Toe Dancer
Dam Kissin Rene (USA) 1997	Monique Rene (USA); 1978	Prince of Ascot	Royal Ascot
Dam Kissin Rene (USA) 1997	Monique Rene (USA); 1978	Prince of Ascot	Bolero's Image
Dam Kissin Rene (USA) 1997	Monique Rene (USA); 1978	Party Date	Speedy Frank
Dam Kissin Rene (USA) 1997	Monique Rene (USA); 1978	Party Date	Pardon My Speed
