= Bigger Picture =

American thoroughbred racehorse

- Sire: Badge of Silver
- Grandsire: Silver Deputy
- Dam: Glory Dancer
- Damsire: Honour And Glory
- Sex: Gelding
- Foaled: 2011
- Country: USA
- Color: Chestnut
- Breeder: Ken & Sarah Ramsey
- Owner: Three Diamonds Farm
- Trainer: Michael J. Maker
- Record: 41:13-7-5
- Earnings: $1,661,635

Major wins
- Red Smith Handicap (2016); United Nations Stakes (2017); John B. Connally Turf Cup (2017, 2018, 2019); Elkhorn Stakes (2019)

Bigger Picture (foaled February 8, 2011, in Kentucky) is an American Thoroughbred racehorse whose wins included the Grade 1 United Nations Handicap plus three consecutive editions of the John B. Connally Turf Cup.

== Career ==
Bigger Picture's first race was on December 7, 2013, at Turfway Park, where he did not finish. He completed his second race however en route to victory on January 1, 2014.

Bigger Picture spent his 2014 and 2015 seasons competing in various claiming races, picking up some wins along the way. During the 2016 season he competed in the Grade 1 United Nations Stakes, finishing eighth. He won his first graded race on November 12, 2016, at the Red Smith Handicap.

He picked up his first of two wins in his 2017 season by winning the Grade -3 John B. Connally Turf Cup, on January 29, 2017.

His second win of the 2017 season came on July 1, when he competed again in the Grade-1 United Nations Stakes. He came into the race at 10–1 odds and in a major upset was victorious. He finished on the podium at both the July 2017 Bowling Green Handicap and the August 2017 Sword Dancer Stakes.

He started off his 2018 season with a successful defense of his John B. Connally Turf Cup crown by coming in first place. He did not win any more races in 2018, but came close with a third-place finish at the 2018 United Nations Stakes.

He won the John B. Connally Turf Cu] for the third time on January 27, 2019. He also added another victory to his name by winning the 2019 Elkhorn Stakes. This was his final win of 2019.

== Pedigree ==
Pedigree of Bigger Picture (USA), 2011
Sire Badge of Silver (USA) 2000	Silver Deputy (CAN); 1985	Deputy Minister	Vice Regent
Sire Badge of Silver (USA) 2000	Silver Deputy (CAN); 1985	Deputy Minister	Mint Copy
Sire Badge of Silver (USA) 2000	Silver Deputy (CAN); 1985	Silver Valley	Mr. Prospector
Sire Badge of Silver (USA) 2000	Silver Deputy (CAN); 1985	Silver Valley	Seven Valleys
Sire Badge of Silver (USA) 2000	Silveroo (USA); 1992	Silver Hawk	Roberto
Sire Badge of Silver (USA) 2000	Silveroo (USA); 1992	Silver Hawk	Gris Vitesse
Sire Badge of Silver (USA) 2000	Silveroo (USA); 1992	Hey Mama	High Tribute
Sire Badge of Silver (USA) 2000	Silveroo (USA); 1992	Hey Mama	Pat's Mama
Dam Glory Dancer (CAN) 2002	Honour And Glory (USA); 1993	Relaunch	In Reality
Dam Glory Dancer (CAN) 2002	Honour And Glory (USA); 1993	Relaunch	Foggy Note
Dam Glory Dancer (CAN) 2002	Honour And Glory (USA); 1993	Fair to All	Al Nasr
Dam Glory Dancer (CAN) 2002	Honour And Glory (USA); 1993	Fair to All	Gonfalon
Dam Glory Dancer (CAN) 2002	Dancing All Night (USA); 1984	Nijinsky	Northern Dancer
Dam Glory Dancer (CAN) 2002	Dancing All Night (USA); 1984	Nijinsky	Flaming Page
Dam Glory Dancer (CAN) 2002	Dancing All Night (USA); 1984	Blitey	Riva Ridge
Dam Glory Dancer (CAN) 2002	Dancing All Night (USA); 1984	Blitey	Lady Pitt
