= Tenebrism (horse) =

Irish-trained Thoroughbred racehorse

- Racing silks of Merriebelle, Westerberg & Coolmore
- Sire: Caravaggio
- Grandsire: Scat Daddy
- Dam: Immortal Verse
- Damsire: Pivotal
- Sex: Filly
- Foaled: 11 March 2019
- Country: United States
- Colour: Bay
- Breeder: Merriebelle Stables & Orpendale/Chelston/Wynatt
- Owner: Merriebelle, Westerberg & Coolmore
- Trainer: Aidan O'Brien
- Record: 5: 3-0-0
- Earnings: £387,157

Major wins
- Cheveley Park Stakes (2021); Prix Jean Prat (2022); Cork Stakes (2023)

Tenebrism (foaled 11 March 2019) is an American-bred, Irish-trained Thoroughbred racehorse. As a two-year-old in 2021 she won a minor race on her debut and then returned from a lengthy absence to take the Group 1 Cheveley Park Stakes.

== Background ==
Tenebrism is a bay filly with a white star and snip bred in Kentucky by Merriebelle Stables in association with Orpendale/Chelston/Wynatt, a breeding company linked to the Coolmore Stud. She was sent into training with Aidan O'Brien at Ballydoyle. She is owned in partnership by Merriebelle, Coolmore and Georg von Opel.

She was from the first crop of foals sired by Caravaggio, a sprinter whose wins included the Phoenix Stakes and Commonwealth Cup. Tenebrism's dam Immortal Verse was an outstanding racemare who won the Coronation Stakes and the Prix Jacques le Marois in 2011. Immortal Verse's dam Side of Paradise won the listed Prix La Camargo at Saint-Cloud Racecourse in 2001, and was a half-sister to Last Tycoon and the Goldene Peitsche winner Astronef. She was a granddaughter of the influential broodmare Irish Lass, whose other descendants have included Assert, Bikala, Irish Ball (Irish Derby), Tie Black (Poule d'Essai des Pouliches), Eurobird and Valentine Waltz.

== Racing career ==
=== 2021: two-year-old season ===
Tenebrism made her track debut in a maiden race over five furlongs on soft ground at Naas Racecourse on 28 March when she was ridden by Seamie Heffernan and started the 7/2 favourite. After racing towards the rear of the nine-runner field and running "green" (showing inexperience) she accelerated into the lead inside the final furlong and drew away to win by three and three quarter lengths.

After an absence of six months, Tenebrism returned in the Group 1 Cheveley Park Stakes over six furlongs at Newmarket Racecourse on 25 September and started a 14/1 outsider in a twelve-runner field. The Round Tower Stakes winner Sacred Bridge started favourite while the other contenders included Zain Claudette (Lowther Stakes), Sandrine (Duchess of Cambridge Stakes), Flotus (Ripon Champion Two Years Old Trophy) and Corazon (Prix d'Arenberg). Ridden by Ryan Moore Tenebrism came from well back in the field to overtake the front-running Flotus in the closing stages and won "comfortably" by a length with a gap of three lengths back to Sandrine in third. After the race Aidan O'Brien said "I didn't think it was possible for her to do it, not because of ability, but because of the layoff. She had a setback after her first race and was off a long time. She was literally just ready to come racing. I had a knot in my stomach, wondering whether it was fair to run her, but there's only one Cheveley Park, and you don't often get horses with her speed and turn of foot."

== Pedigree ==
Pedigree of Tenebrism (USA), bay filly, 2019
Sire Caravaggio (USA) 2014	Scat Daddy (USA); 2004	Johannesburg	Hennessy
Sire Caravaggio (USA) 2014	Scat Daddy (USA); 2004	Johannesburg	Myth
Sire Caravaggio (USA) 2014	Scat Daddy (USA); 2004	Love Style	Mr Prospector
Sire Caravaggio (USA) 2014	Scat Daddy (USA); 2004	Love Style	Likeable Style
Sire Caravaggio (USA) 2014	Mekko Hokte (USA); 2000	Holy Bull	Great Above
Sire Caravaggio (USA) 2014	Mekko Hokte (USA); 2000	Holy Bull	Sharon Brown
Sire Caravaggio (USA) 2014	Mekko Hokte (USA); 2000	Aerosilver	Relaunch
Sire Caravaggio (USA) 2014	Mekko Hokte (USA); 2000	Aerosilver	Silver In Flight
Dam Immortal Verse (IRE) 2008	Pivotal (GB); 1993	Polar Falcon (USA)	Nureyev
Dam Immortal Verse (IRE) 2008	Pivotal (GB); 1993	Polar Falcon (USA)	Marie d'Argonne (FR)
Dam Immortal Verse (IRE) 2008	Pivotal (GB); 1993	Fearless Revival	Cozzene (USA)
Dam Immortal Verse (IRE) 2008	Pivotal (GB); 1993	Fearless Revival	Stufida
Dam Immortal Verse (IRE) 2008	Side of Paradise (IRE); 1998	Sadler's Wells (USA)	Northern Dancer (CAN)
Dam Immortal Verse (IRE) 2008	Side of Paradise (IRE); 1998	Sadler's Wells (USA)	Fairy Bridge
Dam Immortal Verse (IRE) 2008	Side of Paradise (IRE); 1998	Mill Princess	Mill Reef (USA)
Dam Immortal Verse (IRE) 2008	Side of Paradise (IRE); 1998	Mill Princess	Irish Lass (GB) (Family: 8-c)
