= A Case of You =

A Case of You may refer to:

- "A Case of You" (song), a song by Joni Mitchell
- A Case of You (film), 2013 American film
- A Case of You (horse) (foaled 2018)
