= Silver Medallion (horse) =

American thoroughbred racehorse

- Sire: Badge of Silver
- Grandsire: Silver Deputy
- Dam: Another Vegetarian
- Damsire: Stalwart
- Foaled: May 1st, 2008
- Country: USA
- Breeder: Brereton C. Jones
- Owner: Black Rock Stables LLC
- Trainer: Todd A. Pletcher
- Jockey: Javier Castellano
- Record: 13:5-2-1
- Earnings: $426,123

Major wins
- Tropical Turf Handicap (2011); Fort Lauderdale Stakes (2012)

Silver Medallion (foaled May 1st, 2008) is an American Thoroughbred racehorse and the winner of the 2011 Tropical Turf Handicap.

== Career ==
Silver Medallion's first race was on August 4, 2010, at Saratoga, where he came in first. He picked up his next win on December 31, 2010, by winning the Eddie Logan Stakes.

Silver Medallion started off the 2011 year with a February 12th, 2011 victory at the El Camino Real Derby. In April, he competed in the 2011 Santa Anita Derby, but placed in 4th.

It took him 3 more races before he picked up another win at his last race of the year - the 2011 Tropical Turf Handicap in December.

Silver Medallion followed his victory up win a win the following month at the 2012 Fort Lauderdale Stakes.

His final race was at the February 11th, 2012 Gulfstream Park Turf Handicap, where he finished in 7th.

Silver Medallion was injured during training and was retired in May 2012.

== Pedigree ==
Pedigree of Silver Medallion (USA), 2008
Sire Badge of Silver (USA) 2000	Silver Deputy (CAN); 1985	Deputy Minister	Vice Regent
Sire Badge of Silver (USA) 2000	Silver Deputy (CAN); 1985	Deputy Minister	Mint Copy
Sire Badge of Silver (USA) 2000	Silver Deputy (CAN); 1985	Silver Valley	Mr. Prospector
Sire Badge of Silver (USA) 2000	Silver Deputy (CAN); 1985	Silver Valley	Seven Valleys
Sire Badge of Silver (USA) 2000	Silveroo (USA); 1992	Silver Hawk	Roberto
Sire Badge of Silver (USA) 2000	Silveroo (USA); 1992	Silver Hawk	Gris Vitesse
Sire Badge of Silver (USA) 2000	Silveroo (USA); 1992	Hey Mama	High Tribute
Sire Badge of Silver (USA) 2000	Silveroo (USA); 1992	Hey Mama	Pat's Mama
Dam Another Vegetarian (USA) 1995	Stalwart (USA); 1979	Hoist the Flag	Tom Rolfe
Dam Another Vegetarian (USA) 1995	Stalwart (USA); 1979	Hoist the Flag	Wavy Navy
Dam Another Vegetarian (USA) 1995	Stalwart (USA); 1979	Yes Dear Maggy	Iron Ruler
Dam Another Vegetarian (USA) 1995	Stalwart (USA); 1979	Yes Dear Maggy	Yes Dear
Dam Another Vegetarian (USA) 1995	Lucy Sims (USA); 1984	Northjet	Northfields
Dam Another Vegetarian (USA) 1995	Lucy Sims (USA); 1984	Northjet	Jellatina
Dam Another Vegetarian (USA) 1995	Lucy Sims (USA); 1984	Join The Waves	Sailor
Dam Another Vegetarian (USA) 1995	Lucy Sims (USA); 1984	Join The Waves	Nato
