= Stark Contrast =

Stark Contrast may refer to:

- Stark Contrast (horse), an American Thoroughbred race horse
- Stark Contrast (title), Superior Iron Man, Invincible Iron Man (vol. 3 & 4), International Iron Man, Infamous Iron Man, Ironheart
