= With a City =

American-bred Thoroughbred racehorse

- Sire: City Zip
- Grandsire: Carson City
- Dam: With A Princess
- Damsire: With Approval
- Sex: Stallion
- Foaled: April 25, 2003
- Country: United States
- Colour: Bay
- Breeder: Carl Bowling
- Owner: Equirace.com
- Trainer: Michael J. Maker
- Record: 13: 4-0-2
- Earnings: US$359,680

Major wins
- Lane's End Stakes (2006)

With a City (April 25, 2003 – April 23, 2006) was a thoroughbred horse. As a foal of 2003, he was a possible contender for the Triple Crown in 2006. However, With a City contracted a mysterious illness at Trackside Louisville on Thursday April 20, 2006.

He was euthanized by lethal injection on Sunday, April 23, 2006 after his condition rapidly deteriorated.

== Connections ==
With a City was owned by Equirace.com., and trained by Michael Maker. He was ridden by Brice Blanc and bred in Florida by Carl Bowling.

== Breeding ==
His sire was City Zip while his dam was With A Princess.

== Races ==
Finish	Race	Distance	Track	Condition
13th	Arkansas Derby	One and One-Eighth Miles	Oaklawn Park	Fast
1st	Lane's End Stakes	One and One-Eighth Miles	Turfway Park	Fast
8th	John Battaglia Memorial Stakes	One and One-Sixteenth Miles	Turfway Park	Fast
1st	Allowance	One and One-Sixteenth Miles (Turf)	Calder Race Course	Firm
1st	Claiming	One and One-Sixteenths Miles (Turf)	Calder Race Course	Firm
5th	Claiming	One and One-Sixteenth Miles (Turf)	Calder Race Course	Good
4th	Claiming	One Mile	Calder Race Course	Fast
3rd	Claiming	One Mile	Calder Race Course	Good
9th	Seacliff Stakes	One Mile	Calder Race Course	Sloppy
5th	Allowance	Six Furlongs	Calder Race Course	Fast
4th	Birdonthewire Stakes	Five and One-Half Furlongs	Calder Race Course	Fast
3rd	BLsSweep Stakes	Five and One-Half Furlongs	Calder Race Course	Sloppy
1st	Maiden Claiming	Five and One-Half Furlongs	Calder Race Course	Fast
