= Caravaggio (horse) =

American-bred Thoroughbred racehorse

- Racing silks of Mrs John Magnier
- Sire: Scat Daddy
- Grandsire: Johannesburg
- Dam: Mekko Hokte
- Damsire: Holy Bull
- Sex: Stallion
- Foaled: 23 February 2014
- Country: United States
- Colour: Grey
- Breeder: Windmill Manor Farms & Petaluma Bloodstock
- Owner: Derrick Smith, Susan Magnier & Michael Tabor
- Trainer: Aidan O'Brien
- Record: 10: 7-0-1
- Earnings: £724,465

Major wins
- Marble Hill Stakes (2016); Coventry Stakes (2016); Phoenix Stakes (2016); Lacken Stakes (2017); Commonwealth Cup (2017); Flying Five Stakes (2017)

Caravaggio (foaled 23 February 2014) is an American-bred, Irish-trained retired Thoroughbred racehorse and active breeding stallion. As a two-year-old he was one of the best colts of his generation in Europe when he was unbeaten in four races including the Marble Hill Stakes, Coventry Stakes and Phoenix Stakes. In the following year he took his winning run to six with victories in the Lacken Stakes and the Commonwealth Cup but his only success in four subsequent starts came in the Flying Five. He was retired from racing at the end of 2017 having won seven of his ten starts. Aidan O'Brien described him as the fastest horse that he had ever trained.

== Background ==
Caravaggio is a grey horse standing 15.3½ hands high bred in Kentucky by Windmill Manor Farms & Petaluma Bloodstock. As a foal in November 2014 he was scheduled to be auctioned at Keeneland but was withdrawn from the sale. He was then acquired by John Magnier's Coolmore Stud organisation and was then sent to Europe where he entered training with Aidan O'Brien at Ballydoyle. During his racing career he was officially owned in partnership by Michael Tabor, Susan Magnier and Derrick Smith but usually carried the dark blue colours of Susan Magnier. He was ridden in all but two of his races by Ryan Moore.

He was sired by Scat Daddy, who won the Champagne Stakes in 2006 and the Florida Derby in 2007 before his racing career was ended by injury. Scat Daddy's other offspring include No Nay Never, Daddy Long Legs and Lady Aurelia. Caravaggio's dam Mekko Hokte, from whom he inherited his grey colour, showed some racing ability, winning three of her eight races including the Delta Miss Stakes at Louisiana Downs in 2002. She was descendant of the French broodmare Never Again (foaled 1934) who was the female-line ancestor of numerous major winners including Olwyn, Al Bahathri and Haafhd.

== Racing career ==
=== 2016: two-year-old season ===
Caravaggio made his racecourse debut in a maiden race over five furlongs on the all-weather Polytrack surface at Dundalk Racecourse on 18 April. Ridden by Seamie Heffernan and starting at odds of 1/3 he took the lead approaching the final furlong and held on "comfortably" by one and three quarter lengths from his stablemate Lundy. On 21 May the colt was switched to the turf and stepped up in class and distance for the Listed Marble Hill Stakes over six furlongs at the Curragh Racecourse. Starting the 4/7 favourite in a nine-runner field he tracked the leaders before taking the lead inside the final furlong and drawing away to win by two and quarter lengths from Mister Trader with the filly Roly Poly taking fourth place. Ryan Moore described the winner as "a big baby" whilst Aidan O'Brien expressed his satisfaction saying "I'm very happy with that. That's his first run on grass and he will have learned a lot today".

In June the colt was sent to England to contest the Coventry Stakes at Royal Ascot and started the 13/8 favourite in an eighteen-runner field, with the best fancied of his opponents being Psychedelic Funk (unbeaten in two races), Mehmas (runner-up in the National Stakes), Mokarris, Yalta and Thunder Snow. Racing down the centre of the straight course, Caravaggio was restrained by Moore before making a forward move in the last quarter mile. He took the lead entering the final furlong and drew away to win in "impressive" style by two and a quarter lengths from Mehmas. O'Brien commented "He has always been very exciting. He has loads of scope, loads of length and has a very good mind. He is a very relaxed and powerful horse. We always thought this horse was very smart."

When Caravaggio was moved up to Group 1 level for the Phoenix Stakes at the Curragh on 7 August he started the 1/8 favourite with the only one of his four opponents to start at less than 25/1 being the Railway Stakes winner Medicine Jack. With Heffernan in the saddle he went to the front a furlong and a half from the finish and quickly went clear to win "easily" by four lengths from his stablemate Courage Under Fire. O'Brien said "Everything went 100%. In his last piece of work he hit a top speed of 45 miles per hour – no horse in Ballydoyle has ever been able to do that... He's the fastest we have ever had".

The colt was being prepared for a run in the Middle Park Stakes when he sustained a muscle injury on 18 August and did not run again that year.

=== 2017: three-year-old season ===
Although Caravaggio had been considered a contender for the 2000 Guineas but in 2017 he was campaigned in sprint races. He began his season in the Group 3 Lacken Stakes over six furlongs at Naas Racecourse on 21 May and started the 8/15 favourite against six opponents. After racing towards the rear of the field in the early stages he took the lead in the final furlong and drew away to win easily by four and three quarter lengths from Psychedelic Funk. O'Brien reiterated his high opinion of the winner saying "He's an unbelievably quick horse... I've never seen a quicker horse and that's why we went this way with him".

On 23 June the colt ran for the second time at Royal Ascot and started 5/6 favourite for the Group 1 Commonwealth Cup. His main rivals appeared to be the Godolphin pair Harry Angel and Blue Point and the American challenger Bound For Nowhere. Caravaggio raced in mid-division as Harry Angel set the pace but was then switched to the right to make his challenge a quarter of a mile from the finish. He went to the front inside the final furlong and won by three-quarters of a length and half a length from Harry Angel and Blue Point, with the trio finishing well clear of the other nine runners. Moore commented "I think that was a fairly exceptional race. He's beaten two very good horses there. They made him work and it's the first time he's ever been asked a question so he was a bit unsure when he got the message but he responded well".

Three weeks after his win at Ascot, Caravaggio attempted to take his unbeaten run to seven when he was matched against older horses for the first time in the July Cup at Newmarket Racecourse. He was restrained by Moore in the early stages before making progress in the last quarter mile but was unable to reach the leaders and finished fourth behind Harry Angel, Limato and Brando. The colt was widely expected to return to winning form in the Prix Maurice de Gheest over 1300 metres at Deauville Racecourse in August but never looked likely to win and came home sixth of the thirteen runners behind Brando. On September 10 Caravaggio was dropped back to Group 2 class for the Flying Five at the Curragh in which he faced ten opponents headed by Caspian Prince (Sapphire Stakes) and Cotai Glory (World Trophy). He produced his customary late run to take the lead in the closing stages and won comfortably by a length from the 50/1 outsider Alphabet.

Caravaggio ended his track career in the British Champions Sprint Stakes at Ascot on 21 October. For the first and only time in his ten races, he did not start favourite, being made the 9/2 second choice in the betting behind Harry Angel. After starting poorly he stayed on very strongly in the closing stages to take third behind Librisa Breeze and Tasleet.

== Assessment and awards ==
In the Cartier Racing Awards for 2016, Caravaggio was one of four nominees for the Champion Two-year-old Colt title, but lost out to his stablemate Churchill. In the official classification of European juveniles Caravaggio was given a rating of 116 making him the fifth-best colt behind Churchill, National Defense, Thunder Snow and Lancaster Bomber.

== Stud record ==
Caravaggio was retired from racing at the end of the 2017 season to become a breeding stallion for the Coolmore Stud. He initially stood at fee of €35,000.

=== Notable progeny ===
Caravaggio's Grade/Group One winners:

c = colt, f = filly, g = gelding

Foaled	Name	Sex	Major Wins
2019	Tenebrism	f	Cheveley Park Stakes, Prix Jean Prat
2019	Whitebeam	f	Diana Stakes (2023, 2024)
2021	Porta Fortuna	f	Cheveley Park Stakes, Coronation Stakes, Falmouth Stakes, Matron Stakes
2023	Stark Contrast	c	American Turf Stakes
2023	Erdenali	g	Prix du Moulin de Longchamp, Mile Championship

== Pedigree ==
Pedigree of Caravaggio, grey colt, 2014
Sire Scat Daddy (USA) 2004	Johannesburg (USA); 1999	Hennessy	Storm Cat
Sire Scat Daddy (USA) 2004	Johannesburg (USA); 1999	Hennessy	Island Kitty
Sire Scat Daddy (USA) 2004	Johannesburg (USA); 1999	Myth	Ogygian
Sire Scat Daddy (USA) 2004	Johannesburg (USA); 1999	Myth	Yarn
Sire Scat Daddy (USA) 2004	Love Style (USA); 1999	Mr. Prospector	Raise a Native
Sire Scat Daddy (USA) 2004	Love Style (USA); 1999	Mr. Prospector	Gold Digger
Sire Scat Daddy (USA) 2004	Love Style (USA); 1999	Likeable Style	Nijinsky
Sire Scat Daddy (USA) 2004	Love Style (USA); 1999	Likeable Style	Personable Lady
Dam Mekko Hokte (USA) 2000	Holy Bull (USA); 1991	Great Above	Minnesota Mac
Dam Mekko Hokte (USA) 2000	Holy Bull (USA); 1991	Great Above	Ta Wee
Dam Mekko Hokte (USA) 2000	Holy Bull (USA); 1991	Sharon Brown	Al Hattab
Dam Mekko Hokte (USA) 2000	Holy Bull (USA); 1991	Sharon Brown	Agathea's Dawn
Dam Mekko Hokte (USA) 2000	Aerosilver (USA); 1992	Relaunch	In Reality
Dam Mekko Hokte (USA) 2000	Aerosilver (USA); 1992	Relaunch	Foggy Note
Dam Mekko Hokte (USA) 2000	Aerosilver (USA); 1992	Silver In Flight	Silver Series
Dam Mekko Hokte (USA) 2000	Aerosilver (USA); 1992	Silver In Flight	Winter Wren (Family:9-e)
