= Zuma Beach Stakes =

Annual US horse race

- Class: Grade III
- Location: Santa Anita Park; Arcadia, California, United States
- Inaugurated: 2012
- Race type: Thoroughbred – Flat racing
- Website: Santa Anita

Race information
- Distance: 1 mile
- Surface: Turf
- Track: left-handed
- Qualification: Two-years-old
- Weight: 122 lbs. with allowances
- Purse: $100,000 (since 2024)

The Zuma Beach Stakes is a Grade III American Thoroughbred horse race for two-year-olds over a distance of one mile on the turf track scheduled annually in October at Santa Anita Park in Arcadia, California. The event currently carries a purse of $100,000.

== History ==
The event is named after a popular beach, Zuma Beach, located in Los Angeles County, California.

The inaugural running of the event was inaugurated on October 8, 2012, and was won by the California-bred Gervinho who was trained by Carla Gaines and ridden by the Rafael Bejarano by half-a-length in a time of 1:34.59. Gervinho had a short but impressive career performing well in the Californian turf Derbys and winning the Grade II Sir Beaufort Stakes to be voted Californian Three-Year-Old of the Year in 2013.

The event is a preparatory race for the Breeders' Cup Juvenile Turf. Although no horse has won both events, 2014 winner of the Zuma Beach Stakes, Luck of the Kitten finished second in the Breeders' Cup Juvenile Turf to Hootenanny which was held also at Santa Anita Park.

The 2019 winner Hit The Road as a four-year-old went on to win a Grade 1 event (Frank E. Kilroe Mile Stakes)

In 2022 the event was upgraded by the Thoroughbred Owners and Breeders Association to a Grade III.

== Records ==
Speed record:

- 1 mile: 1:33.56 – Big Score (2016)

Margins:

- 3 1/4 lengths – Big Score (2016)

Most wins by an owner:

- 3 – Amerman Racing (2023, 2025, 2026)

Most wins by a jockey:

- 2 – Corey Nakatani (2013, 2014)
- 2 – Gary L. Stevens (2015, 2018)
- 2 – Juan J. Hernandez (2021, 2023)

Most wins by a trainer:

- 3 – Michael W. McCarthy (2023, 2025, 2026)

== Winners ==
Year	Winner	Jockey	Trainer	Owner	Distance	Time	Purse	Grade	Ref
2026	Repo Man	Umberto Rispoli	Michael W. McCarthy	Amerman Racing	1 mile	1:36.05	$100,000	III	
2025	Stark Contrast	Kazushi Kimura	Michael W. McCarthy	Amerman Racing	1 mile	1:34.77	$100,000	III	
2024	†Iron Man Cal	Antonio Fresu	Philip D'Amato	Little Red Feather Racing & Madaket Stables	1 mile	1:34.45	$101,500	III	
2023	Endlessly	Juan J. Hernandez	Michael W. McCarthy	Amerman Racing	1 mile	1:34.52	$201,500	III	
2022	Packs a Wahlop	Mike E. Smith	Jeff Mullins	Red Baron's Barn & Rancho Temescal	1 mile	1:34.07	$203,000	III	
2021	Mackinnon	Juan J. Hernandez	Doug F. O'Neill	ERJ Racing, Madaket Stables & Dave Kenney	1 mile	1:33.80	$202,500	Listed	
2020	Ebeko (IRE)	Ricardo Gonzalez	Peter L. Miller	Altamira Racing Stable, CYBT, Marc Lantzman & Michael Nentwig	1 mile	1:36.55	$101,000	Listed	
2019	Hit the Road	Victor Espinoza	Dan Blacker	D K Racing, Radley Equine, Taste of Victory Stables & Rick Gold	1 mile	1:34.33	$100,702	Listed	
2018	King of Speed	Gary L. Stevens	Jeffrey L. Bonde	Del Secco DCS Racing	1 mile	1:34.35	$101,035	Listed	
2017	My Boy Jack	Kent J. Desormeaux	J. Keith Desormeaux	Don't Tell My Wife Stables & Monomoy Stables	1 mile	1:33.84	$101,725	Listed	
2016	Big Score	Flavien Prat	Tim Yakteen	George Krikorian	1 mile	1:33.56	$102,415	Listed	
2015	Dressed in Hermes	Gary L. Stevens	Janet Armstrong	Budget Stable	1 mile	1:35.76	$101,250	Listed	
2014	Luck of the Kitten	Corey Nakatani	Wesley A. Ward	Kenneth L. and Sarah K. Ramsey	1 mile	1:34.84	$101,250	Listed	
2013	Aotearoa	Corey Nakatani	Leonard Powell	Paul A. Viskovich	1 mile	1:34.42	$100,250		
2012	Gervinho	Rafael Bejarano	Carla Gaines	Keith Brackpool	1 mile	1:34.59	$100,000	Listed	

Legend:
Turf
Notes:
† In the 2024 Artislas was first past the post but was disqualified and placed third due to interference in the stretch run. Iron Man Cal was declared the winner and Sabertooth was promoted to second.

== See also ==
List of American and Canadian Graded races
