= Ghostzapper Stakes =

- Class: Grade III
- Location: Gulfstream Park; Hallandale Beach, Florida
- Inaugurated: 1985 (as Creme Fraiche Stakes)
- Race type: Thoroughbred - Flat racing
- Website: www.gulfstreampark.com

Race information
- Distance: 1 1/16 miles
- Surface: Dirt
- Track: left-handed
- Qualification: Four-years-old and older
- Weight: 124 lbs with allowances
- Purse: $150,000 (since 2023)

The Ghostzapper Stakes is a Grade III American Thoroughbred horse race for four-years-old and older at a distance of one and one-sixteenth miles on the dirt run annually in March at Gulfstream Park located in Hallandale Beach, Florida. The event currently offers a purse of $150,000.

== History ==
The inaugural running of the event was on 26 April 1990 as the Creme Fraiche Stakes over a distance of 7 furlongs and was won by Big Sal ridden US Hall of Fame jockey Earlie Fires by who led all the way in a time of 1:24 4/5

The event was named in honor of the 1985 Belmont Stakes winner, Creme Fraiche who also won Grade I Donn Handicap and W.L. McKnight Handicap at Gulfstream Park.

The following year, 1991 the event's conditions were changed to a handicap and the distance extended to 1 1/16 miles.

In 1993 the American Graded Stakes Committee upgraded the race to Grade III.

In 2003 the event was renamed to the Hal's Hope Handicap after the Florida-bred Hal's Hope who had won the event in 2002 and who also won the 2000 Grade I Florida Derby, 2000 Holy Bull Stakes and the 2002 Grade I Gulfstream Park Handicap.

In 2005 the distance of the event was extended to 1 1/8 miles but after two runnings the distance was decreased to one mile.

In 2009 the conditions of the event were changed to a stakes allowance which reflected in the modification of the event's name.

In 2020 the distance of the event was increased to 1 1/8 miles.

In 2021 the event was renamed to the owner of Gulfstream Park, Frank Stronach's US Hall of Fame and 2004 US Horse of the Year Champion, Ghostzapper as the Ghostzapper Stakes.

In 2023 the distance of the event was decreased from 1 1/8 miles to 1 1/16 miles.

== Records ==
Speed record:

- 1 1/8 miles – 1:48.57 Badge of Silver (2005)
- 1 1/16 miles – 1:41.49 Geri (1996)
- 1 mile – 1:33.87 Chatain (2007)

Margins:

- 8 lengths – K. J.'s Appeal (1998)

Most wins:

- 2 – Chatain (2007, 2008)
- 2 – Lea (2014, 2015)

Most wins by a jockey:

- 6 - John R. Velazquez (1998, 2010, 2012, 2019, 2024, 2026)

Most wins by a trainer:

- 6 - Todd A. Pletcher (2010, 2016, 2017, 2019, 2022, 2026)

Most wins by an owner:

- 2 - Lazy F Ranch (2007, 2008)
- 2 - Claiborne Farm & Adele B. Dilschneider (2014, 2015)
- 2 - Repole Stable (2022, 2026)

== Winners ==
Year	Winner	Age	Jockey	Trainer	Owner	Distance	Time	Purse	Grade	Ref
Ghostzapper Stakes
2026	Grande	4	John R. Velazquez	Todd A. Pletcher	Repole Stable	1 1/16 miles	1:44.26	$150,000	III	
2025	White Abarrio	6	Irad Ortiz Jr.	Saffie A. Joseph Jr.	C2 Racing Stable, Gary Barber & La Milagrosa Stable	1 1/16 miles	1:41.97	$150,000	III	
2024	Il Miracolo	4	John R. Velazquez	Antonio Sano	Alexandres	1 1/16 miles	1:43.79	$150,000	III	
2023	Clapton	4	Emisael Jaramillo	Juan Alvarado	Arindel	1 1/16 miles	1:42.94	$180,000	III	
2022	Fearless	6	Luis Saez	Todd A. Pletcher	Repole Stable	1 1/8 miles	1:50.03	$100,000	III	
2021	Eye of a Jedi	6	Javier Castellano	Steve Budhoo	Steve Budhoo	1 1/8 miles	1:48.83	$100,000	III	
Hal's Hope Stakes
2020	Identifier	4	Marcos Meneses	Oscar M. Gonzalez	Gelfenstein Farm	1 1/8 miles	1:50.25	$100,000	III	
2019	Prince Lucky	4	John R. Velazquez	Todd A. Pletcher	Daniel W. McConnell Sr.	1 mile	1:34.84	$100,000	III	
2018	Economic Model	5	Irad Ortiz Jr.	Chad C. Brown	Klaravich Stables & William H. Lawrence	1 mile	1:36.50	$100,000	III	
2017	Tommy Macho	5	Luis Saez	Todd A. Pletcher	Paul P. Pompa Jr. & J Stables	1 mile	1:35.20	$150,000	III	
2016	Mshawish	6	Javier Castellano	Todd A. Pletcher	Al Shaqab Racing	1 mile	1:34.61	$150,000	III	
2015	Lea	6	Joel Rosario	William I. Mott	Claiborne Farm & Adele B. Dilschneider	1 mile	1:35.46	$150,000	III	
2014	Lea	5	Luis Saez	William I. Mott	Claiborne Farm & Adele B. Dilschneider	1 mile	1:35.30	$100,000	III	
2013	Csaba	4	Luis Saez	Philip A. Gleaves	Bruce Hollander & Cary Shapoff	1 mile	1:35.69	$100,000	III	
2012	Jackson Bend	5	John R. Velazquez	Nicholas P. Zito	Robert V. LaPenta & Fred J. Brei	1 mile	1:38.19	$100,000	III	
2011	Soaring Empire	4	Jose Lezcano	Cam Gambolati	Ol Memorial Stable & C. E. Glasscock	1 mile	1:35.99	$100,000	III	
2010	Quality Road	4	John R. Velazquez	Todd A. Pletcher	Edward P. Evans	1 mile	1:36.33	$100,000	III	
2009	Delightful Kiss	5	Calvin H. Borel	Pete D. Anderson	Hobeau Farm	1 mile	1:36.13	$100,000	III	
Hal's Hope Handicap
2008	Chatain	5	Cornelio Velasquez	Angel A. Penna Jr.	Lazy F Ranch	1 mile	1:36.39	$100,000	III	
2007	Chatain	4	Cornelio Velasquez	Angel A. Penna Jr.	Lazy F Ranch	1 mile	1:33.87	$100,000	III	
2006	On Thin Ice	5	Shaun Bridgmohan	Joe Orseno	D. J. Stable	1 1/8 miles	1:48.05	$100,000	III	
2005	Badge of Silver	5	Jerry D. Bailey	Robert J. Frankel	Kenneth L. and Sarah K. Ramsey	1 1/8 miles	1:48.57	$100,000	III	
2004	Puzzlement	5	Jorge F. Chavez	H. Allen Jerkens	Joseph V. Shields Jr.	1 1/16 miles	1:42.39	$100,000	III	
2003	Windsor Castle	5	Eibar Coa	Frank A. Alexander	Dogwood Stable	1 1/16 miles	1:42.33	$100,000	III	
Creme Fraiche Handicap
2002	Hal's Hope	5	Roger I. Velez	Harold J. Rose	Rose Family Stable	1 1/16 miles	1:42.40	$100,000	III	
2001	Race not held									
2000	Dancing Guy	5	Jerry D. Bailey	Newcomb Green	Frances Green	1 1/16 miles	1:44.94	$75,000	III	
1999	Jazz Club	4	Pat Day	Neil J. Howard	William S. Farish & Joseph Jamail	1 1/16 miles	1:42.76	$75,000	III	
1998	K. J.'s Appeal	4	John R. Velazquez	Frank A. Alexander	Releib Stable	1 1/16 miles	1:42.34	$75,000	III	
1997	Louis Quatorze	4	Pat Day	Nicholas P. Zito	William J. Condren, Georgia E. Hofmann & Joseph Cornacchia	1 1/16 miles	1:43.43	$75,000	III	
1996	Geri	4	Jerry D. Bailey	William I. Mott	Allen E. Paulson	1 1/16 miles	1:41.49	$75,000	III	
1995	Warm Wayne	4	Jerry D. Bailey	Reynaldo H. Nobles	Due Process Stables	1 1/16 miles	1:43.11	$75,000	III	
1994	Forever Whirl	4	Herb McCauley	Martin D. Wolfson	Irving Ellis & Alan Reskin	1 1/16 miles	1:41.81	$75,000	III	
1993	Classic Seven	5	Carlos E. Lopez Sr.	Thomas M. Cairns	Thomas M. Cairns & John O. Berry	1 1/16 miles	1:43.49	$100,000	III	
1992	Peanut Butter Onit	6	Jose A. Santos	Frank J. Lange	Elaine J Meltzer	1 1/16 miles	1:43.78	$75,000	Listed	
1991	New York Swell	8	Jose O. Alferez	Lawrence W. Jennings Jr.	Ballet Stable	1 1/16 miles	1:42.50	$75,000	Listed	
Creme Fraiche Stakes
1990	Big Sal	5	Earlie Fires	Cam Gambolati	Sarkisian & Tierney	7 furlongs	1:24.80	$33,900		

== See also ==
- List of American and Canadian Graded races
