= Eddie Logan =

Eddie Logan (May 2, 1910 – January 31, 2009) was a well-known personality at the Santa Anita Park racetrack, where he had been a shoeshine attendant since its opening day on December 25, 1934. He claimed to have been a Negro league baseball player for the Homestead Grays and the Kansas City Monarchs, though no evidence has yet been found to substantiate the claim.

Logan died early on the morning of January 31, 2009 at his home in Monrovia, California, aged 98, having suffered a stroke on January 3.

Santa Anita honored him with the Eddie Logan Stakes that ran first in 2006.
