= Immortal Verse =

Irish-bred Thoroughbred racehorse (2008–2026)

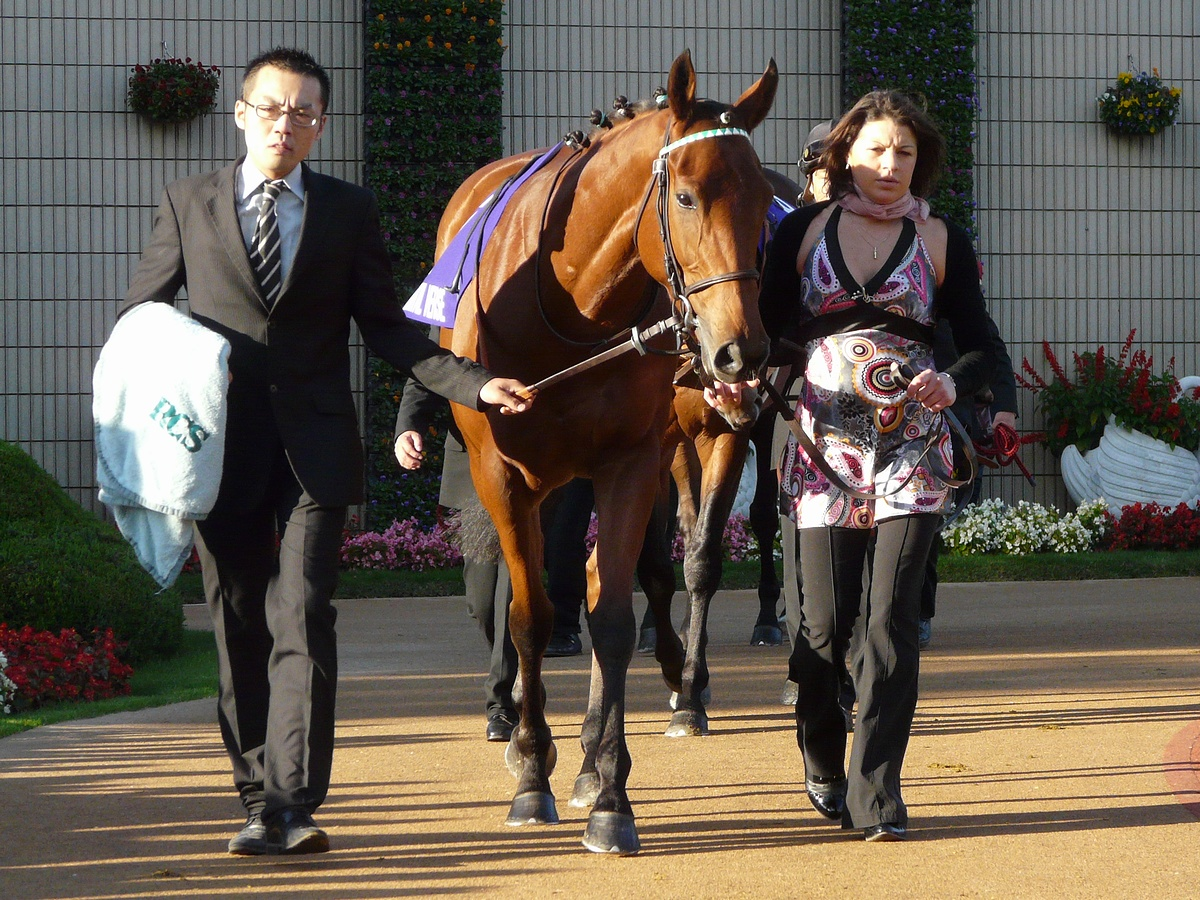
- Immortal Verse in 2011
- Sire: Pivotal
- Grandsire: Polar Falcon
- Dam: Side of Paradise
- Damsire: Sadler's Wells
- Sex: Mare
- Foaled: 1 May 2008
- Died: August 2026 (aged 18); Kentucky, U.S.
- Country: Ireland
- Colour: Bay
- Breeder: Kilfrush Stud
- Owner: Richard C Strauss
- Trainer: Robert Collet
- Record: 11: 4-1-1
- Earnings: £648,241

Major wins
- Prix de Sandringham (2011); Coronation Stakes (2011); Prix Jacques Le Marois (2011)

Awards
- Top-rated French-trained three-year-old filly (2011)

Immortal Verse (1 May 2008 – August 2026) was an Irish-bred, French-trained Thoroughbred racehorse and broodmare. As a two-year-old she showed promise by winning on her debut and finishing second in the Prix d'Aumale. Her early form in 2011 was disappointing as she was beaten in her first two races and refused to enter the starting stalls in the 1000 Guineas. She then made rapid improvement, winning the Prix de Sandringham and the Coronation Stakes at Royal Ascot before defeating a strong international field in the Prix Jacques Le Marois. She went on to finish third to Frankel in the Queen Elizabeth II Stakes but failed to reproduce her best form in two races as a four-year-old. After her retirement from racing she was sold at auction for 4.7 million guineas setting a European record price for a broodmare.

== Background ==
Immortal Verse was a bay filly with no white markings bred by her owner Richard C Strauss's County Limerick-based Kilfrush Stud. Her sire Pivotal was a top-class sprinter who won the King's Stand Stakes and the Nunthorpe Stakes in 1996. He went on to become an "excellent" sire, getting the winners of more than a thousand races across a range of distances including Sariska, Somnus, Farhh, Kyllachy (Nunthorpe Stakes) and Excellent Art (St James's Palace Stakes). Her dam Side of Paradise won the listed Prix La Camargo at Saint-Cloud Racecourse in 2001, and was a half-sister to Last Tycoon and the Goldene Peitsche winner Astronef. She was a granddaughter of the influential broodmare Irish Lass, whose other descendants have included Assert, Bikala, Irish Ball (Irish Derby), Tie Black (Poule d'Essai des Pouliches), Eurobird (Irish St. Leger) and Valentine Waltz (Poule d'Essai des Pouliches). The filly was sent into training with Robert Collet at Chantilly.

== Racing career ==
=== 2010: two-year-old season ===
On her racecourse debut, Immortal Verse ran in the Prix d'Ommeel over 1300 metres at Deauville Racecourse on 20 August. Ridden by Sebastien Maillot, she took the lead inside the last 200 metres and won by one-and-a-half lengths from Action Chope. In September she was moved up in class and distance for the Group Three Prix d'Aumale over 1600 metres at Longchamp Racecourse. Starting the 2.8/1 second favourite, she finished second of the four runners behind the Criquette Head-trained Helleborine.

=== 2011: three-year-old season ===
On her first appearance as a three-year-old, Immortal Verse started joint-favourite for the Prix du Louvre over 1600 metres at Longchamp but finished fourth of the seven runners after being hampered in the closing stages. She was then sent to England to contest the 1000 Guineas at Newmarket Racecourse but was withdrawn from the race after refusing to enter the starting stalls. Two weeks later at Longchamp, Immortal Verse started a 25/1 outsider for the Poule d'Essai des Pouliches: she never looked likely to win and finished eleventh of the sixteen runners behind Golden Lilac. At Chantilly Racecourse on 5 June the filly started at odds of 8/1 in a seven-runner field for the Group Two Prix de Sandringham. The field included Esperita and Mixed Intention, who had finished ahead of Immortal Verse in the Pouliches and the Chartwell Fillies' Stakes winner Perfect Tribute from England. In a rough race, Immortal Verse bumped Esperita as she made progress from the back of the field 300 metres from the finish before taking the lead 60 metres and winning from half a length from Mixed Intention.

On 17 June, Immortal Verse was one of twelve fillies to contest the Group One Coronation Stakes over one mile at Royal Ascot. The 7/2 favourite was the Irish-trained Together, who had finished runner-up in both the 1000 Guineas and the Irish 1,000 Guineas, whilst Immortal Verse, ridden for the first time by Gerald Mosse started at 8/1. The other contenders included Nova Hawk (trained by Robert Collet's son Rod Collet), Theyskens' Theory, (Prestige Stakes), Claiomh Solais (4th in the Irish 1000 Guineas), Memory (Cherry Hinton Stakes), Joviality (Musidora Stakes) and Barefoot Lady (Nell Gwyn Stakes). Mosse restrained his mount in last place before switching to the outside to make a challenge in the straight. Immortal Verse accelerated past all her opponents, took the lead a furlong out, and drew away to win by two and a quarter lengths from Nova Hawk with Barefoot Lady taking third place. Collet described her as the best filly he had ever trained before explaining that on her previous visit to England she had become irritated and uncooperative when the stalls handlers placed a hood over her head.

After an eight-week break, Immortal Verse returned for the Group One Prix Jacques Le Marois at Deauville, in which she was matched for the first time against colts and older horses for the first time. She was the 10/1 fourth choice in the betting behind Goldikova, Mutual Trust (Prix Jean Prat) and Planteur (Prix Ganay). The other runners included Sahpresa, Dick Turpin (Prix Jean Prat), Cityscape (Joel Stakes), Worthadd (Derby Italiano) and Tin Horse (Poule d'Essai des Poulains). Mosse again restrained the filly at the back of the field before accelerating in the last 600 metres. Immortal Verse took the lead 300 metres out and held off late challenges from Goldikova and Sahpresa to win by a length and a nose. After the race, Collet said, "She proved again what I've always known, that she is a super filly. She had a little problem after the Coronation at Ascot as she fell in the yard and had to miss the Rothschild. This filly is out of the ordinary and she's entered in all the top events, including the QEII". The filly was scheduled to return in the Prix du Moulin at Longchamp but missed the race after a training accident. According to Collet she was working in Chantilly forest when a jogger disturbed two deer which ran across the path, causing Immortal Verse to panic, break loose and sustain a minor leg injury.

In October, Immortal Verse was sent to Britain for a third time for the Queen Elizabeth II Stakes at Ascot in which she was matched against the outstanding colt Frankel. She started at odds of 7/1 and finished well without ever looking likely to win, finishing third to Frankel and Excelebration. On her final appearance of the year the filly was sent to Japan to contest the Mile Championship at Kyoto Racecourse in November. She produced a strong run along the inside rail in the straight, but weakened in the last 200 metres to finish seventh behind the locally trained Eishin Apollon.

=== 2012: four-year-old season ===
Immortal Verse remained in training as a four-year-old but made only two appearances and failed to recover her best form. She finished last of five behind Elusive Kate in the Prix Rothschild on 29 July and eighth of eleven behind Excelebration when attempting to repeat her 2011 success in the Prix Jacques Le Marois.

== Assessment ==
In the 2011 World Thoroughbred Rankings, Immortal verse was given a rating of 121, making her the 38th-best racehorse in the world, and the best three-year-old filly trained in France.

== Breeding record ==
Immortal Verse was retired from racing to become a broodmare. In 2013 she produced a colt foal sired by Dansili. She was covered again by Dansili in 2013 and in December that year she was offered for sale at Tattersalls in Newmarket. She was bought for 4.7 million guineas (a European record for a broodmare) by Adrian Nicol, acting on behalf of the Coolmore Stud. Her 2019 foal by Caravaggio, named Tenebrism, won the 2021 Cheveley Park Stakes to give Immortal Verse a first Group One win as a broodmare. Her 2022 foal, a colt by Wootton Bassett, named Henri Matisse, gave Immortal Verse a first classic win by winning the 2025 Poule d'Essai des Poulains.

== Death ==
Immortal Verse died in Kentucky in August 2026, at the age of 18.

== Pedigree ==
Pedigree of Immortal Verse (IRE), bay mare, 2008
Sire Pivotal (GB) 1993	Polar Falcon (USA); 1987	Nureyev	Northern Dancer*
Sire Pivotal (GB) 1993	Polar Falcon (USA); 1987	Nureyev	Special
Sire Pivotal (GB) 1993	Polar Falcon (USA); 1987	Marie d'Argonne	Jefferson
Sire Pivotal (GB) 1993	Polar Falcon (USA); 1987	Marie d'Argonne	Mohair
Sire Pivotal (GB) 1993	Fearless Revival (GB); 1987	Cozzene	Caro
Sire Pivotal (GB) 1993	Fearless Revival (GB); 1987	Cozzene	Ride The Trails
Sire Pivotal (GB) 1993	Fearless Revival (GB); 1987	Stufida	Bustino
Sire Pivotal (GB) 1993	Fearless Revival (GB); 1987	Stufida	Zerbinetta
Dam Side of Paradise (IRE) 1998	Sadler's Wells (USA); 1981	Northern Dancer*	Nearctic
Dam Side of Paradise (IRE) 1998	Sadler's Wells (USA); 1981	Northern Dancer*	Natalma
Dam Side of Paradise (IRE) 1998	Sadler's Wells (USA); 1981	Fairy Bridge	Bold Reason
Dam Side of Paradise (IRE) 1998	Sadler's Wells (USA); 1981	Fairy Bridge	Special
Dam Side of Paradise (IRE) 1998	Mill Princess (IRE); 1977	Mill Reef	Never Bend
Dam Side of Paradise (IRE) 1998	Mill Princess (IRE); 1977	Mill Reef	Milan Mill
Dam Side of Paradise (IRE) 1998	Mill Princess (IRE); 1977	Irish Lass	Sayajirao
Dam Side of Paradise (IRE) 1998	Mill Princess (IRE); 1977	Irish Lass	Scollata (Family: 8-c)

- Immortal Verse is inbred 3 ×4 to Northern Dancer, meaning that the stallion appears in both the third and fourth generations of her pedigree. She is also inbred 4 × 4 to the mare Special.
