= John B. Connally Turf Cup =

John B. Connally Turf Cup Stakes
- Class: Listed
- Location: Sam Houston Race Park; Houston, Texas, United States
- Inaugurated: 1995 (as John B. Connally Jr. Turf Cup Handicap)
- Race type: Thoroughbred
- Website: Sam Houston Race Park

Race information
- Distance: 1 1/2 miles
- Surface: Turf
- Track: Left-handed
- Qualification: Four-year-olds and older
- Weight: 123 lbs with allowances
- Purse: $200,000 (since 2010)

The John B. Connally Turf Cup is a Listed American Thoroughbred horse race, for four-year-olds and older over a distance of one and one-half miles (12 furlongs) on the turf track, held annually in late January or early February at Sam Houston Race Park in Houston, Texas. The event currently carries a purse of $200,000.

== History ==
One of Sam Houston Race Park's most prestigious races is named in honor of former Texas governor John B. Connally (1917–1993) who was long time supporter and lobbied for the horse racing industry in Texas.

The inaugural running of the event was on 21 October 1995 as the John B. Connally Jr. Turf Cup Handicap for horses three-years-old or older over a distance of 1 1/8 miles and was won by Temple Webber Junior's Marastani by 3/4 lengths in a time of 1:51.25.

The following year 1990 and until 2008, the Breeders' Cup sponsored the event which reflected in the name of the event. In 1997 the event was moved from October to early April.

The event was upgraded in 2006 by the American Graded Stakes Committee to a Grade III race. In 2009 the event was not held.

In 2011 the event was moved to a January schedule and the conditions were changed to allow only four-year-olds and older. The following year the event's conditions were changed from a handicap to a stakes with allowances with the name of the event modified to the John B. Connally Turf Cup Stakes.

In 2016 the distance of the event was increased to 1 1/2 miles.

In 2025 the event was downgraded by the Thoroughbred Owners and Breeders Association to Listed status.

Along with the Ladies Classic, Pulse Power Turf Sprint and Bob Bork Texas Turf Mile, the John B. Connally Turf Cup is one of the main events of the Houston Racing Festival.

== Records ==
Speed record:

- 1 1/8 miles: 1:47.65 – Chorwon (1999)
- 1 1/2 miles: 2:28.16 – Da Big Hoss (2016)

Margins:

- 4 3/4 lengths – Da Big Hoss (2016)

Most wins:

- 3 – Candid Glen (2001, 2002, 2003)
- 3 – Bigger Picture (2017, 2018, 2019)

Most wins by a jockey:

- 3 – Robby Albarado (2000, 2006, 2010)
- 3 – Elvis J. Perrodin (2001, 2002, 2003)
- 3 – José Ortiz (2017, 2018, 2019)

Most wins by a trainer:

- 10 – Michael J. Maker (2012, 2014, 2015, 2016, 2017, 2018, 2019, 2024, 2025, 2026)

Most wins by an owner:

- 5 – Three Diamonds Farm (2017, 2018, 2019, 2024, 2026)

== Winners ==
| Year | Winner | Age | Jockey | Trainer | Owner | Distance | Time | Purse | Grade | Ref |
|---|---|---|---|---|---|---|---|---|---|---|
John B. Connally Turf Cup Stakes
| 2026 | Anegada | 4 | Rafael Hernandez | Michael J. Maker | Three Diamonds Farm | 1 1/2 miles | 2:34.10 | $200,000 | Listed | |
| 2025 | Sugoi | 8 | Stewart Elliott | Michael J. Maker | Paradise Farms & David Staudacher | 1 1/2 miles | 2:33.05 | $200,000 | Listed | |
| 2024 | Dynadrive | 7 | Reylu Gutierrez | Michael J. Maker | Three Diamonds Farm | 1 1/2 miles | 2:34.00 | $200,000 | III | |
| 2023 | Scarlet Fusion | 6 | Adam Beschizza | Joe Sharp | Carl R. Moore Management & Brad Grady | 1 1/2 miles | 2:33.50 | $200,000 | III | |
| 2022 | Another Mystery | 6 | Jareth Loveberry | Chris Block | Team Block | 1 1/2 miles | 2:31.28 | $200,000 | III | Dead heat |
| 2022 | Fantasioso (ARG) | 7 | James Graham | Ignacio Correas IV | Bloom Racing Stable & Ignacio Correas IV | 1 1/2 miles | 2:31.28 | $200,000 | III | Dead heat |
| 2021 | Spooky Channel | 6 | Julien R. Leparoux | Brian A. Lynch | Terry Hamilton | 1 1/2 miles | 2:30.94 | $200,000 | III | |
| 2020 | Dot Matrix | 7 | Florent Geroux | Brad H. Cox | Ten Strike Racing | 1 1/2 miles | 2:33.46 | $200,000 | III | |
| 2019 | Bigger Picture | 8 | Jose L. Ortiz | Michael J. Maker | Three Diamonds Farm | 1 1/2 miles | 2:32.62 | $200,000 | III | |
| 2018 | Bigger Picture | 7 | Jose L. Ortiz | Michael J. Maker | Three Diamonds Farm | 1 1/2 miles | 2:31.13 | $200,000 | III | |
| 2017 | Bigger Picture | 6 | Jose L. Ortiz | Michael J. Maker | Three Diamonds Farm | 1 1/2 miles | 2:32.24 | $248,500 | III | |
| 2016 | Da Big Hoss | 5 | Florent Geroux | Michael J. Maker | Skychai Racing | 1 1/2 miles | 2:28.16 | $200,000 | III | |
| 2015 | Coalport | 6 | Miguel Mena | Michael J. Maker | Kenneth & Sarah Ramsey | 1 1/8 miles | 1:49.00 | $200,000 | III | |
| 2014 | Admiral Kitten | 4 | Julien R. Leparoux | Michael J. Maker | Kenneth & Sarah Ramsey | 1 1/8 miles | 1:49.80 | $200,000 | III | |
| 2013 | Swift Warrior | 5 | Jose L. Espinoza | John P. Terranova II | James Covello & James Dolan | 1 1/8 miles | 1:49.21 | $200,000 | III | |
| 2012 | Papaw Bodie | 5 | Rosie Napravnik | Michael J. Maker | Connie M. Apostelos | 1 1/8 miles | 1:49.84 | $200,000 | III | |
John B. Connally Turf Cup Handicap
| 2011 | Schramsberg | 5 | Chris Landeros | Chris A. Hartman | Bobby Joe Hammer | 1 1/8 miles | 1:50.22 | $200,000 | III | |
John B. Connally Turf Handicap
| 2010 | Acting Zippy | 5 | Robby Albarado | William Don Bennett | William Don Bennett & Carl Bowling | 1 1/8 miles | 1:52.31 | $197,000 | III | |
| 2009 | Race not held | | | | | | | | | |
| 2008 | Scrappy Roo | 5 | Paul M. Nolan | John G. Locke | Tawana Cantrell | 1 1/8 miles | 1:51.65 | $168,500 | III | |
| 2007 | Mending Fences | 5 | Quincy Hamilton | Martin D. Wolfson | Farnworth Stables | 1 1/8 miles | 1:52.34 | $201,000 | III | |
| 2006 | Fort Prado | 5 | Robby Albarado | Jeff Trosclair | Team Block | 1 1/8 miles | 1:49.41 | $193,000 | III | |
| 2005 | Rapid Proof | 5 | Brian Hernandez Jr. | Hal R. Wiggins | Dolphus C. Morrison | 1 1/8 miles | 1:51.31 | $216,000 | Listed | |
| 2004 | Warleigh | 4 | Jeremy Beasley | Steven M. Asmussen | Rosendo G. Parra | 1 1/8 miles | 1:53.01 | $222,000 | Listed | |
| 2003 | Candid Glen | 6 | Elvis J. Perrodin | Andrew Leggio Jr. | Glen C. Warren | 1 1/8 miles | 1:53.21 | $223,000 | Listed | |
| 2002 | Candid Glen | 5 | Elvis J. Perrodin | Andrew Leggio Jr. | Glen C. Warren | 1 1/8 miles | 1:50.38 | $222,000 | Listed | |
| 2001 | Candid Glen | 4 | Elvis J. Perrodin | Andrew Leggio Jr. | Glen C. Warren | 1 1/8 miles | 1:50.51 | $212,000 | Listed | |
| 2000 | Rod and Staff | 7 | Robby Albarado | Bobby C. Barnett | Jim H. Plemmons | 1 1/8 miles | 1:51.68 | $162,250 | Listed | |
| 1999 | Chorwon | 6 | Calvin H. Borel | Hal R. Wiggins | Thomas C. Mueller | 1 1/8 miles | 1:47.65 | $165,750 | Listed | |
| 1998 | Chorwon | 5 | Gerard Melancon | Hal R. Wiggins | Thomas C. Mueller | 1 1/8 miles | 1:51.86 | $137,850 | Listed | |
| 1997 | Scott's Scoundrel | 5 | Ronald D. Ardoin | Paul J. Pellerin | Virgil L. Huskey | 1 1/8 miles | 1:53.63 | $125,000 | Listed | |
| 1996 | Western Trader | 5 | Carlos Gonzalez | Bobby C. Barnett | John A. Franks | 1 1/8 miles | 1:52.30 | $122,250 | Listed | |
John B. Connally Jr. Turf Cup Handicap
| 1995 | Marastani | 5 | Curt C. Bourque | Thomas M. Amoss | Temple Webber Jr. | 1 1/8 miles | 1:51.25 | $75,000 | Listed | |

Legend:
Turf

== See also ==
- List of American and Canadian Graded races
