= Lacken Stakes =

Flat horse race in Ireland

Lacken Stakes
2026
Havana Anna	Oh Cecelia	Tahcawin

Previous years
2025
Babouche	Whistlejacket	Carla Ridge
2024
Bucanero Fuerte	Givemethebeatboys	My Mate Alfie
2023
The Antarctic	Ocean Quest	Ocean Jewel
2022
Twilight Jet	New York City	Saliteh
2021
A Case Of You	Power Under Me	Mooneista

2020-2014
2020
Art Power	Millisle	Zarzyni
2019
So Perfect	Gustavus Weston	Flash Gordon
2018
Sioux Nation	Fleet Review	Speak In Colours
2017
Caravaggio	Psychedelic Funk	Mr Scarlet
2016
Only Mine	Washington Dc	Aclaim
2015
Anthem Alexander	The Happy Prince	Toscanini
2014
Due Diligence	Sailors Swan	Shining Emerald

The Lacken Stakes is a Group 3 flat horse race in Ireland open to horses aged three years only. It is run at Naas over a distance of 6 furlongs (1,206 metres), and it is scheduled to take place each year in late May or early June.

The race was first run, as a Listed race, in 2014. It was awarded Group 3 status in 2015.

== Records ==
Leading jockey (4 wins):

- Ryan Moore – Caravaggio (2017), Sioux Nation (2018), So Perfect (2019), The Antarctic (2023)

Leading trainer (5 wins):

- Aidan O'Brien – Due Diligence (2014), Caravaggio (2017), Sioux Nation (2018), So Perfect (2019), The Antarctic (2023)

== Winners ==
Year	Winner	Jockey	Trainer	Time
2014	Due Diligence	Joseph O'Brien	Aidan O'Brien	1:10.41
2015	Anthem Alexander	Pat Smullen	Edward Lynam	1:15.51
2016	Only Mine	Garry Carroll	Joseph G Murphy	1:09.93
2017	Caravaggio	Ryan Moore	Aidan O'Brien	1:12.33
2018	Sioux Nation	Ryan Moore	Aidan O'Brien	1:10.20
2019	So Perfect	Ryan Moore	Aidan O'Brien	1:10.46
2020	Art Power (Note: The 2020 race was run in July due to the COVID-19 pandemic in the Republic of Ireland)	Colin Keane	Tim Easterby	1:13.30
2021	A Case of You	Ronan Whelan	Adrian McGuinness	1:13.69
2022	Twilight Jet	Leigh Roche	Michael O'Callaghan	1:10.87
2023	The Antarctic	Ryan Moore	Aidan O'Brien	1:09.41
2024	Bucanero Fuerte	David Egan	Adrian Murray	1:09.23
2025	Babouche	Colin Keane	Ger Lyons	1:09.51
2026	Havana Anna	Gavin Ryan	Donnacha O'Brien	1:11:93

== See also ==
- Horse racing in Ireland
- List of Irish flat horse races
