= Stark Contrast (horse) =

American racehorse

- Sire: Caravaggio
- Grandsire: Scat Daddy
- Dam: Catch the Eye
- Damsire: Quality Road
- Sex: Colt
- Foaled: March 2, 2023
- Country: United States
- Color: Bay
- Breeder: Mrs. Jerry Amerman
- Owner: Amerman Racing
- Trainer: Michael W. McCarthy
- Record: 7: 4 - 2 - 0
- Earnings: US$1,066,060

Major wins
- Zuma Beach Stakes (2025); American Turf Stakes (2026)
- Last updated on May 4, 2026

Stark Contrast (foaled March 2, 2023) is a Grade I winning American Thoroughbred racehorse who won the 2026 American Turf Stakes at Churchill Downs.

== Background ==
Stark Contrast is a bay colt who was bred in Kentucky by Mrs. Jerry Amerman and is owned by Amerman Racing with her husband John. He is out of the Graded-placed Quality Road mare Catch the Eye. Catch the Eye finished third in the 2020 Grade III John C. Mabee Stakes at Del Mar Racetrack. Catch the Eye was also bred by Mrs. Jerry Amerman and her dam, the Irish-bred Turns My Head was bought by Amerman Racing in 2008 at the Keeneland September Yearling Sales.

Stark Contrast's sire is Caravaggio who was an outstanding two-year-old in 2016 in Great Britain and Ireland. In 2025 Caravaggio stood at Japanese Bloodhorse Breeders' Association Shizunai Stallion Station.

Stark Contrast is trained by trainer Michael W. McCarthy.

== Statistics ==
Date	Distance	Race	Grade	Track	Odds	Field	Finish	Winning Time	Winning (Losing) Margin	Jockey	Ref
2025 – Two-year-old season
Aug 16, 2025	6 furlongs	Maiden Special Weight		Del Mar	17.80	6	4	1:10.17	(11 1/2 lengths)	Kazushi Kimura	
Sep 6, 2025	1 mile	Maiden Special Weight		Del Mar	3.40*	10	1	1:36.96	1 length	Kazushi Kimura	
Oct 5, 2025	1 mile	Zuma Beach Stakes	III	Santa Anita	3.60	5	1	1:35.38	1 length	Kazushi Kimura	
Oct 31, 2025	1 mile	Breeders' Cup Juvenile Turf	I	Del Mar	58.20	14	2	1:34.93	(3/4 length)	Kazushi Kimura	
2026 – Three-year-old season
Jan 8, 2026	1 mile	Eddie Logan Stakes	Listed	Santa Anita	0.30*	5	1	1:35.38	2 1/4 lengths	Kazushi Kimura	
Mar 21, 2026	1 1/8 miles	Jeff Ruby Steaks	III	Turfway Park	2.22	12	2	1:49.84	(2 1/2 lengths)	Kazushi Kimura	
May 2, 2026	1 1/16 miles	American Turf Stakes	I	Churchill Downs	1.20*	13	1	1:40.31	2 1/4 lengths	Flavien Prat	

Legend:
Turf All Weather Track Dirt
Notes:
An (*) asterisk after the odds means Stark Contrast was the post-time favourite.

== Pedigree ==
Pedigree of Stark Contrast, bay colt, March 2, 2023
Sire Caravaggio (2014)	Scat Daddy (2004)	Johannesburg (1999)	Hennessy (1993)
Sire Caravaggio (2014)	Scat Daddy (2004)	Johannesburg (1999)	Myth (1993)
Sire Caravaggio (2014)	Scat Daddy (2004)	Love Style (1999)	Mr Prospector (1970)
Sire Caravaggio (2014)	Scat Daddy (2004)	Love Style (1999)	Likeable Style (1990)
Sire Caravaggio (2014)	Mekko Hokte (2000)	Holy Bull (1991)	Great Above (1972)
Sire Caravaggio (2014)	Mekko Hokte (2000)	Holy Bull (1991)	Sharon Brown (1980)
Sire Caravaggio (2014)	Mekko Hokte (2000)	Aerosilver (1992)	Relaunch (1976)
Sire Caravaggio (2014)	Mekko Hokte (2000)	Aerosilver (1992)	Silver In Flight (1980)
Dam Catch the Eye (2016)	Quality Road (2006)	Elusive Quality (1993)	Gone West (1984)
Dam Catch the Eye (2016)	Quality Road (2006)	Elusive Quality (1993)	Touch of Greatness (1986)
Dam Catch the Eye (2016)	Quality Road (2006)	Kobla (1995)	Strawberry Road (AUS) (1979)
Dam Catch the Eye (2016)	Quality Road (2006)	Kobla (1995)	Winglet (1988)
Dam Catch the Eye (2016)	Turn My Head (IRE) (2007)	Montjeu (IRE) (1993)	Sadler's Wells (1981)
Dam Catch the Eye (2016)	Turn My Head (IRE) (2007)	Montjeu (IRE) (1993)	Floripedes (1985)
Dam Catch the Eye (2016)	Turn My Head (IRE) (2007)	Egyptian Queen (2004)	Storm Cat (1983)
Dam Catch the Eye (2016)	Turn My Head (IRE) (2007)	Egyptian Queen (2004)	Warrior Queen (1997) (Family: 4-j)
