= Cork Stakes =

Flat horse race in Ireland

Cork Stakes
2026
Navassa Island	Soldier's Tree	King Cuan

Previous years
2025
Lady With The Lamp	Vespertilio	One Smack Mac
2024
Easy	Yosemite Valley	The Highway Rat
2023
Tenebrism	Wodao	Pretty Rebel
2022
Power Under Me	Mooneista	Twilight Spinner
2021
Laugh A Minute	Fiscal Rules	Make A Challenge

2020-2011
2020
Make A Challenge	Downforce	Schroders Mistake
2019
Sergei Prokofiev	Chessman	Smash Williams
2018
Downforce	Son Of Rest	G Force
2017
Downforce	Penny Pepper	Only Mine
2016
Bobby's Kitten	Flight Risk	An Saighdiur
2015
Great Minds	Bold Thady Quill	An Saighdiur
2014
An Saighdiur	Scream Blue Murder	Remember You
2013
Bold Thady Quill	Cape Of Approval	Red Dubawi
2012
The Reaper	Experience	Katla
2011
Inxile	Katla	Dawn Eclipse

2010-2001
2010
Rain Delayed	Miss Gorica	Rock Jock
2008
Contest	Tax Free	The Loan Express
2007
Absolutelyfabulous	That's Hot	Facchetti
2006
Miss Sally	Senor Benny	Majestic Times
2005
Osterhase	Turnkey	Russian Blue
2004
Moon Unit	Dragon Flyer	Peace Offering
2003
Repertory	Osterhase	Final Exam
2002
Minashki	Mr Houdini	Final Exam
2001
Anna Elise	Social Harmony	Conormara

The Cork Stakes is a Listed flat horse race in Ireland open to horses aged three years or older. It is run at Cork over a distance of 6 furlongs (1,206 metres), and it is scheduled to take place each year in late March or early April.

The race was first run in 2001.

== Records ==
Most successful horse (2 wins):

- Downforce – 2017, 2018

Leading jockey (4 wins):

- Billy Lee – Bold Thady Quill (2013), An Saighdiur (2014), Downforce (2017, 2018)

Leading trainer (3 wins):

- Ger Lyons – Rain Delayed (2010), The Reaper (2012), Power Under Me (2022)

== Winners ==
Year	Winner	Age	Jockey	Trainer	Time
2001	Anna Elise	5	Tom Queally	John Flynn	1:10.40
2002	Minashki	3	Pat Shanahan	Harry Rogers	1:12.40
2003	Repertory	10	T G McLaughlin	M S Saunders	0:57.50
2004	Moon Unit	3	D M Grant	Harry Rogers	1:01.10
2005	Osterhase	6	Fran Berry	John Mulhern	1:14.30
2006	Miss Sally	4	Johnny Murtagh	Michael Halford	1:16.20
2007	Absolutelyfabulous	4	Wayne Lordan	David Wachman	1:10.50
2008	Contest	4	Johnny Murtagh	David Wachman	1:15.32
2010	Rain Delayed	4	Keegan Latham	Ger Lyons	1:09.75
2011	Inxile	6	Adrian Nicholls	David Nicholls	1:10.69
2012	The Reaper	4	Johnny Murtagh	Ger Lyons	1:10.38
2013	Bold Thady Quill	6	Billy Lee	Ken Condon	1:19.75
2014	An Saighdiur	7	Billy Lee	Andrew Slattery	1:22.69
2015	Great Minds	5	Wayne Lordan	Tommy Stack	1:15.94
2016	Bobby's Kitten	5	Pat Smullen	Dermot Weld	1:18.54
2017	Downforce	5	Billy Lee	Willie McCreery	1:20.82
2018	Downforce (Note: The 2018 and 2019 races were run at Navan over a distance of 5½ furlongs)	6	Billy Lee	Willie McCreery	1:21.13
2019	Sergei Prokofiev	3	Donnacha O'Brien	Aidan O'Brien	1:12.35
2020	Make A Challenge (Note: The 2020 race was run at Curragh in August due to the COVID-19 pandemic in Ireland)	5	James J Doyle	Denis Gerard Hogan	1:15.58
2021	Laugh A Minute	6	Gavin Ryan	Adrian McGuinness	1:13.68
2022	Power Under Me	4	Colin Keane	Ger Lyons	1:11.92
2023	Tenebrism	4	Ryan Moore	Aidan O'Brien	1:17.77
2024	Easy	4	Andrew Slattery	Andrew Slattery	1:19.54
2025	Lady With The Lamp	3	Declan McDonogh	Joseph O'Brien	1:10.77
2026	Navassa Island	5	Colin Keane	Michael O'Callaghan	1:17.42

== See also ==
- Horse racing in Ireland
- List of Irish flat horse races
