= Jeff Ruby =

American restaurateur and businessman

- Born: Brian Jeffrey Kranz; Newark, New Jersey, U.S.
- Citizenship: American
- Education: Cornell University
- Occupations: Restaurateur; Businessman
- Years active: 1981–present
- Known for: Jeff Ruby Steakhouse
- Children: Britney Ruby Miller (CEO Jeff Ruby Culinary Entertainment); Dillon Ruby; Brandon Ruby
- Website: jeffruby.com

Jeffrey Ruby (born Brian Jeffrey Kranz) is an American restaurateur and businessman. He owns several restaurants in Ohio, Kentucky, and Tennessee.

== Life ==
Jeff Ruby was born in Newark, New Jersey. He left home at the age of 15 and rented a small room in a house he shared with senior citizens. Jeff started working at Perkins Restaurant and Bakery while still in his high school. His high school football coach assisted with Ruby getting a scholarship to Cornell University. Ruby attended Cornell University School of Hotel Administration, graduating in 1965.

After graduating from Cornell, Ruby worked for Holiday Inn in Cincinnati. He met Johnny Bench and Pete Rose, and with their financial backing, Ruby was able to open his first restaurant, The Precinct, in 1981. Ruby's second restaurant, The Waterfront, opened in 1986. The Waterfront was a floating restaurant on the Ohio River in Cincinnati. In the 2010s, The Waterfront struggled due to issues with the restaurant breaking free twice from its dock and a barge hitting it. The Waterfront became submerged in the Ohio River and had to be demolished in October 2014.

In 1999, Ruby opened Jeff Ruby's Steakhouse. The steakhouse expanded with a second location in Louisville, Kentucky, in 2001, and between 2016 and 2019 to Columbus, Lexington, and Nashville. In Spring of 2020, Ruby made daughter Britney Ruby Miller CEO of Jeff Ruby Culinary Entertainment.

In 2010, Ruby began sponsoring jockeys in support of the Permanently Disabled Jockeys Fund. In 2018, the Spiral Stakes, an American Thoroughbred horse race at Turfway Park, was renamed the Jeff Ruby Steaks. In 2016, Ruby made a cameo appearance in the biopic "Gotti" (2018), which portrays life of John Gotti, the boss of the Gambino crime family.

== Public image ==
In 2013, three former waitstaff employees from Carlo & Johnny and Jeff Ruby's Steakhouse downtown filed a federal lawsuit against the restaurants, claiming they were compelled to contribute some of their tips to a pooled fund. In February 2024, another former employee initiated a class action federal labor lawsuit against Jeff Ruby Steaks, alleging that seven of the restaurants required tipped employees to share tips with back-of-house staff. Ruby characterized the allegations as originating from a "former disgruntled employee" and stated that the company intended to defend itself in court.

In 2007, Jeff Ruby's Steakhouse in Louisville made national news when Jeff refused to serve O. J. Simpson. Also in 2016, he banned Donald Trump from his restaurant during a campaign visit due to insulting comments Trump made about Arizona Sen. John McCain and other POWs, questioning their status as heroes. In 2023, Ruby catered a special dinner for the Damar Hamlin family at the University of Cincinnati Medical Center. Various celebrities, including Drake and Sylvester Stallone, are frequent diners at Jeff Ruby's Steakhouse.

In 2014, Ruby published his autobiography called Not Counting Tomorrow: The Unlikely Life of Jeff Ruby.
