= Jeff Ruby Steaks =

Grade III Thoroughbred horse race

Spiral Stakes
- Class: Grade III
- Location: Turfway Park; Florence, Kentucky
- Inaugurated: 1972 (as Latonia Spiral Stakes)
- Race type: Thoroughbred – Flat racing
- Sponsor: Jeff Ruby Culinary Entertainment (since 2018)
- Website: Turfway Park

Race information
- Distance: 1 1/8 miles
- Surface: Tapeta
- Track: left-handed
- Qualification: Three-year-olds
- Weight: Colts and Geldings 123 lbs Fillies 118 lbs
- Purse: $777,000 (as of 2025)

The Spiral Stakes (known as the Jeff Ruby Steaks, a homophone of the word Stakes, for commercial reasons) is a Grade III American thoroughbred horse race for three-year-olds at a distance of a one and one-eighth miles on the synthetic track in late March at Turfway Park in Florence, Kentucky. The event is part of the Road to the Kentucky Derby and offers a purse of $777,000.

== History ==
The event was inaugurated on 1 April 1972 as the Latonia Spiral Stakes over a distance of one mile, established by the General Manager of the Latonia race track John Battaglia for horses "spiraling up" to the Kentucky Derby.

The race in its infancy attracted many entries and the administration of the track decided to run the event in two divisions in the following years: 1973, 1974, 1975, 1977, 1978, and 1980.

In 1982, bourbon whiskey maker Jim Beam acquired naming rights sponsorship and the race was renamed the Jim Beam Spiral Stakes. That year the distance of event was increased to 1 1/16 miles. Two years later the event was named the Jim Beam Stakes. The sponsorship deal lasted for 17 years, and the event attracted many of the prominent three-year-olds during that time.

In 1984, the event was upgraded to Grade III status. In 1988, two years after the track changed owners and was renamed Turfway Park, it was upgraded to a Grade II race and was lengthened to 1 1/8 miles.

In 1999 the race was sponsored for one year by Jim McIngvale of the Gallery Furniture chain of retail stores, and was run as the Galleryfurniture.com Stakes. In 2003, Lane's End Farm took over sponsorship of the event for eight years.

In 2006, the race was run for the first time over an all-weather surface. It was downgraded back to Grade III status in 2011.

Vinery Racing sponsored the Spiral Stakes in 2011 and 2012. In 2013, Horseshoe Casino Cincinnati became the sponsor of the race for five years. As of 2018 the race is sponsored by Jeff Ruby Culinary Entertainment, owner of Jeff Ruby's Steakhouses. As part of the sponsorship, the race is referred to as the Jeff Ruby Steaks (similar to other sporting events named for a product).

In 1991 Hansel set a track and stakes record while winning the Jim Beam Stakes on his way to winning champion three-year-old honors, while Serena's Song became the first filly to win the race in 1995. Winners who would go on to capture at least one of the American Classic Races include Summer Squall (1990), Lil E. Tee (1992), Prairie Bayou (1993), and Animal Kingdom (2011).

== Records ==
Speed record

- 1 1/8 miles – 1:46.60 Hansel (1991)
- 1 1/16 miles – 1:42.00 Banner Bob (1985)
- 1 mile – 1:36.60 Major Run (1980)

Margins

- 15 lengths – Bootlegger's Pet (1973)
- 13 lengths – Five Star General (1980)
- 12 3/4 lengths – Balto Star (2001)

Most wins by an owner

- 4 – Golden Chance Farm (1977, 1978, 1980 (2))

Most wins by a jockey

- 5 – Pat Day (1984, 1987, 1989, 1990, 1992)

Most wins by a trainer

- 7 – William E. Adams (1977 (2), 1978 (2), 1979, 1980 (2))

== Winners ==
| Year | Winner | Jockey | Trainer | Owner | Distance | Time | Purse | Grade | Ref |
|---|---|---|---|---|---|---|---|---|---|
Jeff Ruby Steaks
| 2026 | Fulleffort | Irad Ortiz Jr. | Brad H. Cox | St. Elias Stable and Starlight Racing | 1 1/8 miles | 1:49.94 | $777,000 | III | |
| 2025 | Final Gambit | Luan Machado | Brad H. Cox | Juddmonte Farm | 1 1/8 miles | 1:50.10 | $776,364 | III | |
| 2024 | Endlessly | Umberto Rispoli | Michael W. McCarthy | Amerman Racing | 1 1/8 miles | 1:50.15 | $700,000 | III | |
| 2023 | Two Phil's | Jareth Loveberry | Larry Rivelli | Patricia's Hope & Philip Sagan | 1 1/8 miles | 1:49.03 | $694,000 | III | |
| 2022 | Tiz The Bomb | Brian Hernandez Jr. | Kenneth G. McPeek | Magdalena Racing | 1 1/8 miles | 1:48.60 | $600,000 | III | |
| 2021 | Like the King | Drayden Van Dyke | Wesley A. Ward | M. Racing Group | 1 1/8 miles | 1:50.22 | $243,325 | III | |
| 2020 | Field Pass | Irad Ortiz Jr. | Michael J. Maker | Three Diamonds Farm | 1 1/8 miles | 1:49.34 | $217,175 | III | |
| 2019 | Somelikeithotbrown | Tyler Gaffalione | Michael J. Maker | Skychai Racing & Sand Dollar Stable | 1 1/8 miles | 1:52.05 | $200,000 | III | |
| 2018 | Blended Citizen | Kyle Frey | Doug F. O'Neill | Greg Hall & Sanjay Racing | 1 1/8 miles | 1:50.15 | $200,000 | III | |
Spiral Stakes
| 2017 | Fast and Accurate | Tyler Gaffalione | Michael J. Maker | Kendall E. Hansen | 1 1/8 miles | 1:50:96 | $500,000 | III | |
| 2016 | Oscar Nominated | Brian Hernandez Jr. | Michael J. Maker | Kenneth & Sarah Ramsey | 1 1/8 miles | 1:51.12 | $500,000 | III | |
| 2015 | Dubai Sky | Jose Lezcano | William I. Mott | Three Chimneys Farm & Besilu Stables | 1 1/8 miles | 1:50.26 | $535,750 | III | |
| 2014 | We Miss Artie | John R. Velazquez | Todd A. Pletcher | Kenneth & Sarah Ramsey | 1 1/8 miles | 1:51.98 | $518,950 | III | |
| 2013 | Black Onyx | Joe Bravo | Kelly J. Breen | Sterling Racing | 1 1/8 miles | 1:51.98 | $550,000 | III | |
| 2012 | Went the Day Well | John R. Velazquez | H. Graham Motion | Team Valor & Mark Ford | 1 1/8 miles | 1:51.33 | $500,000 | III | |
| 2011 | Animal Kingdom | Alan Garcia | H. Graham Motion | Team Valor | 1 1/8 miles | 1:52.32 | $500,000 | III | |
Lane's End Stakes
| 2010 | Dean's Kitten | Cornelio Velasquez | Michael J. Maker | Kenneth & Sarah Ramsey | 1 1/8 miles | 1:50.59 | $500,000 | II | |
| 2009 | Hold Me Back | Kent J. Desormeaux | William I. Mott | WinStar Farm | 1 1/8 miles | 1:49.63 | $500,000 | II | |
| 2008 | Adriano | Edgar S. Prado | H. Graham Motion | Courtlandt Farms | 1 1/8 miles | 1:50.20 | $500,000 | II | |
| 2007 | Hard Spun | Mario G. Pino | J. Larry Jones | Fox Hill Farms | 1 1/8 miles | 1:49.41 | $500,000 | II | |
| 2006 | With A City | Brice Blanc | Michael J. Maker | Equirace.com | 1 1/8 miles | 1:51.11 | $500,000 | II | |
| 2005 | Flower Alley | Jorge F. Chavez | Todd A. Pletcher | Melnyk Racing Stables | 1 1/8 miles | 1:50.33 | $500,000 | II | |
| 2004 | Sinister G | Paul R. Toscano | John T. Toscano Jr. | John T. Toscano III, Kim Corrado & Yamile Carlat | 1 1/8 miles | 1:50.71 | $500,000 | II | |
| 2003 | New York Hero | Norberto Arroyo Jr. | Jennifer Pedersen | Paraneck Stable | 1 1/8 miles | 1:50.68 | $500,000 | II | |
Spiral Stakes
| 2002 | Perfect Drift | Eddie Delahoussaye | Murray W. Johnson | Stonecrest Farm | 1 1/8 miles | 1:48.83 | $500,000 | II | |
| 2001 | Balto Star | Mark Guidry | Todd A. Pletcher | Anstu Stable | 1 1/8 miles | 1:47.23 | $600,000 | II | |
| 2000 | Globalize | Francisco C. Torres | Jerry Hollendorfer | Jerry Hollendorfer, Howard Litt & George Todaro | 1 1/8 miles | 1:49.16 | $600,000 | II | |
Galleryfurniture.com Stakes
| 1999 | Stephen Got Even | Shane Sellers | Nicholas P. Zito | Stephen Hilbert | 1 1/8 miles | 1:49.03 | $750,000 | II | |
Jim Beam Stakes
| 1998 | Event of the Year | Russell Baze | Jerry Hollendorfer | Golden Eagle Farm | 1 1/8 miles | 1:47.00 | $600,000 | II | |
| 1997 | Concerto | Carlos H. Marquez Jr. | John J. Tammaro III | Kinsman Stable | 1 1/8 miles | 1:48.20 | $600,000 | II | |
| 1996 | Roar | Mike E. Smith | Claude R. McGaughey III | Claiborne Farm & Adele B. Dilschneider | 1 1/8 miles | 1:49.60 | $600,000 | II | |
| 1995 | ƒ Serena's Song | Corey Nakatani | D. Wayne Lukas | Bob & Beverly Lewis | 1 1/8 miles | 1:49.60 | $600,000 | II | |
| 1994 | Polar Expedition | Curt C. Bourque | Hugh H. Robertson | James B. Cody | 1 1/8 miles | 1:49.00 | $600,000 | II | |
| 1993 | Prairie Bayou | Chris McCarron | Thomas K. Bohannan | Loblolly Stable | 1 1/8 miles | 1:50.80 | $600,000 | II | |
| 1992 | Lil E. Tee | Pat Day | Lynn S. Whiting | W. Cal Partee | 1 1/8 miles | 1:53.40 | $500,000 | II | |
| 1991 | Hansel | Jerry D. Bailey | Frank L. Brothers | Lazy Lane Farm | 1 1/8 miles | 1:46.60 | $500,000 | II | |
| 1990 | Summer Squall | Pat Day | Neil J. Howard | Dogwood Stable | 1 1/8 miles | 1:49.40 | $500,000 | II | |
| 1989 | Western Playboy | Pat Day | Harvey L. Vanier | Nancy Vanier | 1 1/8 miles | 1:49.00 | $500,000 | II | |
| 1988 | Kingpost | Eugene J. Sipus Jr. | Dianne Carpenter | Mark Warner | 1 1/8 miles | 1:50.80 | $500,000 | II | |
| 1987 | J. T.'s Pet | Pat Day | Lynn S. Whiting | W. Cal Partee | 1 1/16 miles | 1:42.80 | $500,000 | III | |
| 1986 | Broad Brush | Vincent Bracciale Jr. | Richard W. Small | Robert E. Meyerhoff | 1 1/16 miles | 1:44.20 | $350,000 | III | |
| 1985 | Banner Bob | K. Keith Allen | Jerome J. Sarner Jr. | Sharon E. & William J. Walsh | 1 1/16 miles | 1:42.00 | $350,000 | III | |
| 1984 | At the Threshold | Pat Day | Lynn S. Whiting | W. Cal Partee | 1 1/16 miles | 1:42.80 | $300,000 | III | |
Spiral Stakes
| 1983 | Marfa | Jorge Velasquez | D. Wayne Lukas | Barry Beal, Robert French Jr. & D. Wayne Lukas | 1 1/16 miles | 1:42.40 | $233,500 | | |
| 1982 | Good n' Dusty | Michael Moran | Jasper Adams | Larry R. Lehmann | 1 1/16 miles | 1:44.60 | $188,500 | | |
| 1981 | Mythical Ruler | Keith Wirth | Fred V. Wirth | Al Risen Jr. & Paxton Price | 1 mile | 1:38.00 | $60,350 | | |
| 1980 | Major Run | Mark S. Sellers | William E. Adams | Golden Chance Farm | 1 mile | 1:36.60 | $31,025 | | Division 1 |
| 1980 | Spruce Needles | Julio C. Espinoza | William E. Adams | Golden Chance Farm | 1 mile | 1:37.20 | $31,025 | | Division 2 |
| 1979 | Lot o' Gold | Don Brumfield | William E. Adams | Frederick E. Lehmann | 1 mile | 1:37.60 | $48,000 | | |
| 1978 | Five Star General | Julio C. Espinoza | William E. Adams | Robert N. Lehmann | 1 mile | 1:38.80 | $21,000 | | Division 1 |
| 1978 | Raymond Earl | Julio C. Espinoza | William E. Adams | Golden Chance Farm | 1 mile | 1:37.80 | $21,600 | | Division 2 |
| 1977 | Smiley's Dream | W. Destefano | William E. Adams | Golden Chance Farm | 1 mile | 1:39.40 | $21,312 | | Division 1 |
| 1977 | Bob's Dusty | Julio C. Espinoza | William E. Adams | Robert N. Lehmann | 1 mile | 1:38.80 | $21,362 | | Division 2 |
| 1976 | Inca Roca | William Nemeti | Albert T. Skinner | Charles Raymond Jarrell | 1 mile | 1:37.40 | $31,300 | | |
| 1975 | Naughty Jake | German Vasquez | Jake Bachelor | Mildred Bachelor | 1 mile | 1:40.00 | $26,400 | | Division 1 |
| 1975 | Ambassador's Image | Eddie Snell | Donald L. Ball | Donamire Farm | 1 mile | 1:38.40 | $26,450 | | Division 2 |
| 1974 | King of Rome | Keith Wirth | Fred V. Wirth | Fred V. Wirth | 1 mile | 1:45.40 | $18,575 | | Division 1 |
| 1974 | Aglorite | John Beech Jr. | Rose Bramble | August Muckler | 1 mile | 1:44.60 | $18,675 | | Division 2 |
| 1973 | Jacks Chevron | Billy Phelps | Carl Sitgraves | W. C. Hines & Mrs. Carl Sitgraves | 1 mile | 1:41.00 | $16,207 | | Division 1 |
| 1973 | Bootlegger's Pet | Mickey Solomone | Charles C. Patrick | Charles C. Patrick, G. McGinnis & V. Victor | 1 mile | 1:42.00 | $16,107 | | Division 2 |
| 1972 | Big Dot | Jim Murchison | James Eckrosh | Everett Lowrance | 1 mile | 1:38.80 | $11,525 | | |

Legend:
All Weather Track Dirt
Notes:
ƒ Filly

== See also ==
- Road to the Kentucky Derby
- List of American and Canadian Graded races
