= Tropical Turf Stakes =

- Class: Grade III
- Location: Gulfstream Park; Hallandale Beach, Florida, United States
- Inaugurated: 1972 (at Calder Race Track as Christmas Day Handicap)
- Race type: Thoroughbred - Flat racing - Turf
- Website: Gulfstream Park

Race information
- Distance: 1 mile
- Surface: Turf
- Track: Left-handed
- Qualification: Three-year-olds and older
- Weight: 124 lbs with allowances
- Purse: $100,000 (since 1994)

The Tropical Turf Stakes is a Grade III American Thoroughbred horse race for horses three years olds and older at the distance of one mile on the turf held annually in January at Gulfstream Park, Hallandale Beach, Florida. The event currently carries a purse of $100,000.

== History ==
It was run as the Christmas Day Handicap through 1992.

Open to three-year-old horses and up, it is set at a distance of one and one-eighth miles (9 furlongs) and currently offers a purse of $100,000.

The Tropical Turf is the last of the four $100,000 stakes races on Gulfstream West's "Grand Slam I program." The My Charmer Handicap is the first, the Three Ring Stakes second, and the Foolish Pleasure Stakes third.

In 2015 this race was run at Gulfstream Park West at one and one-sixteenth mile.

In 2023 the event was downgraded to Listed was not scheduled by Gulfstream Park.

== Records ==
Speed record:

- 1 mile – 1:32.83 – Tusk (2020)
- 1 1/16 miles – 1:42.47 - Lubash (2017)
- 1 1/8 miles – 1:44.95 - Carterista (1993)

Margins:

- 7 lengths – Sir Cat (1997)

Most wins by an owner

- 2 - S A Of South Florida (1992, 1993)
- 2 - Joseph J. Sullivan (1994, 1995)
- 2 - Moyglare Stud Farm (1999, 2013)
- 2 - Richard C. Thompson (2006, 2007)
- 2 - Aliyu Ben J Stables (2014, 2016)

Most wins by a jockey

- 3 – Rene R. Douglas (1994, 1999, 2003)
- 3 – Javier Castellano (2008, 2011, 2019)

Most wins by a trainer

- 5 – Christophe Clement (1999, 2012, 2013, 2014, 2016)

== Winners ==
| Year | Winner | Age | Jockey | Trainer | Owner | Distance | Time | Purse | Grade | Ref |
|---|---|---|---|---|---|---|---|---|---|---|
At Gulfstream Park – Tropical Turf Stakes
| 2023 | Race not held | | | | | | | | | |
| 2022 | Clear Vision | 6 | Julien Leparoux | Matthew O'Connor | MeB Racing Stables | abt. 1 mile | 1:35.36 | $100,000 | III | |
| 2021 | Ride a Comet | 6 | Tyler Gaffalione | Mark E. Casse | John C. Oxley & My Meadowview Farm | 1 mile | 1:33.62 | $100,000 | III | |
| 2020 | Tusk | 7 | Tyler Gaffalione | Saffie A. Joseph Jr. | Jordan V. Wycoff | 1 mile | 1:32.83 | $100,000 | III | |
| 2019 | Doctor Mounty | 6 | Javier Castellano | Claude R. McGaughey III | Larry Pratt & Dave Alden | 1 mile | 1:34.62 | $100,000 | III | |
| 2018 | Race not held due to schedule change | | | | | | | | | |
| 2017 | Shakhimat | 4 | Edgard J. Zayas | Roger L. Attfield | Dan Gale, Roger L. Attfield & William K. Werner | 1 mile | 1:36.03 | $100,000 | III | |
At Calder/Gulfstream Park West – Tropical Turf Handicap
| 2016 | † Lubash | 9 | Joe Bravo | Christophe Clement | Aliyu Ben J Stables | 1 1/16 miles | 1:42.47 | $100,000 | III | |
| 2015 | Lochte | 5 | Matthew Rispoli | Marcus J. Vitali | Crossed Sabres Farm | 1 1/16 miles | 1:50.95 | $100,000 | III | |
| 2014 | Lubash | 7 | Brice Blanc | Christophe Clement | Aliyu Ben J Stables | 1 1/8 miles | 1:50.72 | $100,000 | III | |
| 2013 | Speaking of Which (IRE) | 4 | Joe Bravo | Christophe Clement | Moyglare Stud Farm | 1 1/8 miles | 1:50.03 | $100,000 | III | |
| 2012 | Philly Ace | 4 | Luis Saez | Christophe Clement | Brushwood Stable | 1 1/8 miles | 1:49.22 | $100,000 | III | |
| 2011 | Silver Medallion | 3 | Javier Castellano | Todd A. Pletcher | Black Rock Stables | 1 1/8 miles | 1:48.84 | $100,000 | III | |
| 2010 | Twilight Meteor | 6 | Luis Saez | Martin D. Wolfson | Peachtree Stable | 1 1/8 miles | 1:46.85 | $100,000 | III | |
| 2009 | Race not held | | | | | | | | | |
| 2008 | Spice Route (GB) | 4 | Javier Castellano | Roger L. Attfield | Harlequin Ranches | 1 1/8 miles | 1:48.41 | $100,000 | III | |
| 2007 | Ballast (IRE) | 6 | Kent J. Desormeaux | H. Graham Motion | Richard C. Thompson | 1 1/8 miles | 1:48.54 | $100,000 | III | |
| 2006 | Ballast (IRE) | 5 | Rafael Bejarano | H. Graham Motion | Richard C. Thompson | 1 1/8 miles | 1:47.54 | $100,000 | III | |
| 2005 | Silver Tree | 5 | Jerry D. Bailey | William I. Mott | Peter Vegso | 1 1/8 miles | 1:46.28 | $100,000 | III | |
| 2004 | Host (CHI) | 4 | John R. Velazquez | Todd A. Pletcher | Eugene & Laura Melnyk | 1 1/8 miles | 1:45.74 | $100,000 | III | |
| 2003 | Political Attack | 4 | Rene R. Douglas | Michael R. Matz | Erdenheim Farm | 1 1/8 miles | 1:45.81 | $100,000 | III | |
| 2002 | Krieger | 4 | Eibar Coa | Joe Orseno | Stronach Stables | 1 1/8 miles | 1:47.02 | $100,000 | III | |
| 2001 | Band Is Passing | 5 | Carlos Gonzalez | Stanley M. Ersoff | Stanley M. Ersoff | 1 1/8 miles | 1:46.90 | $100,000 | III | |
| 2000 | Stokosky | 4 | Carlos Alberto Hernandez | Juan P. Rizo | Santa Cruz Ranch | 1 1/8 miles | 1:48.77 | $100,000 | III | |
| 1999 | Hibernian Rhapsody (IRE) | 4 | Rene R. Douglas | Christophe Clement | Moyglare Stud Farm | 1 1/8 miles | 1:46.17 | $100,000 | III | |
| 1998 | Unite's Big Red | 4 | Eduardo O. Nunez | Randy Mills | Break Away Racing Stable & Dream Catcher | 1 1/8 miles | 1:48.96 | $100,000 | III | |
| 1997 | Sir Cat | 4 | Jose Alberto Rivera II | William I. Mott | John R. Murrell | 1 1/8 miles | 1:54.08 | $100,000 | III | |
| 1996 | Mecke | 4 | Robbie Davis | Emanuel Tortora | James R. Lewis Jr. | 1 1/8 miles | 1:46.51 | $100,000 | III | |
| 1995 | The Vid | 5 | Herb McCauley | Martin D. Wolfson | Joseph J. Sullivan | 1 1/8 miles | 1:44.99 | $100,000 | III | |
| 1994 | The Vid | 4 | Rene R. Douglas | Martin D. Wolfson | Joseph J. Sullivan | 1 1/8 miles | 1:49.06 | $100,000 | III | |
| 1993 | Carterista | 5 | Wigberto S. Ramos | Ronald B. Spatz | S A Of South Florida | abt. 1 1/8 miles | 1:44.95 | $75,000 | III | |
Christmas Day Handicap
| 1992 | Carterista | 4 | Michael Andre Lee | Ronald B. Spatz | S A Of South Florida | abt. 1 1/8 miles | 1:46.35 | $50,000 | III | Division 1 |
| 1992 | Bidding Proud | 3 | Jose A. Santos | Jimmy Croll | John C. Sessa | abt. 1 1/8 miles | 1:46.02 | $50,000 | III | Division 2 |
| 1991 | Race not held | | | | | | | | | |
| 1990 | Stolen Rolls | 4 | Pedro A. Rodriguez | Lawrence W. Jennings Jr. | Esquire Farms | abt. 1 1/8 miles | 1:45.20 | $59,500 | III | |
| 1989 | Vaguely Double | 4 | Walter Guerra | Edward Plesa Jr. | Elizabeth A. Sessa | 1 1/8 miles | 1:48.80 | $55,490 | III | |
| 1988 | Equalize | 6 | Jose A. Santos | Angel Penna Sr. | Tartan Farms | 1 1/8 miles | 1:45.00 | $58,350 | III | |
| 1987 | Race not held | | | | | | | | | |
| 1986 | Arctic Honeymoon | 3 | Robert Neal Lester | Luis Olivares | Beverly Green | 1 1/8 miles | 1:54.00 | $54,250 | III | |
| 1985 | Ban the Blues | 6 | Gene St. Leon | William C. Knuck | Harold Kitchen | 1 1/8 miles | 1:53.20 | $56,900 | III | |
| 1984 | Biloxi Indian | 3 | Bryan Fann | Dianne Carpenter | Dianne Carpenter | 1 1/8 miles | 1:54.00 | $61,250 | III | |
| 1983 | ‡ Eminency | 5 | Pat Day | Claude R. McGaughey III | Happy Valley Farm | 1 1/8 miles | 1:51.20 | $54,250 | III | |
| 1982 | Rivalero | 6 | Jacinto Vasquez | David A. Whitely | Calumet Farm | 1 1/8 miles | 1:53.60 | $55,450 | III | |
| 1981 | The Liberal Member | 6 | Jerry D. Bailey | Angel Penna Sr. | Ogden Phipps | 1 1/8 miles | 1:51.80 | $58,550 | III | |
| 1980 | Yosi Boy | 4 | Alfredo Smith Jr. | Jose A. Mendez | Miraflores Stable | 1 1/8 miles | 1:51.80 | $55,300 | | |
| 1979 | Lot o' Gold | 3 | Don Brumfield | William E. Adams | Frederick E. Lehmann | 1 1/8 miles | 1:52.60 | $55,550 | | |
| 1976–1978 | | Race not held | | | | | | | | |
| 1975 | Proud Birdie | 2 | Jack Fieselman | Rosemary G. Henderson | Thomas Edmondson | 1 1/16 miles | 1:47.00 | $31,500 | | 2YOs only |
| 1974 | L. Grant Jr. | 4 | Jimmy Combest | Reed M. Combest | Elkcan Stable | 1 1/16 miles | 1:45.80 | $30,500 | | |
| 1973 | Proud and Bold | 3 | Robert Woodhouse | John Zarthar | Robert Van Worp Sr. | 1 1/16 miles | 1:45.60 | $28,500 | | |
| 1972 | Prince of Truth | 4 | Jacinto Vasquez | Lawrence W. Jennings | Lucky Irish Stable | 1 1/16 miles | 1:46.00 | $29,500 | | |

Legend:
Turf Dirt
Notes:
† In the 2017 running of the event Rose Briar was first past the post but drifted out in the late stretch and was disqualified and placed second. Lubash was declared the winner of the event.
‡ In the 1983 running of the event World Appeal was first past the post was disqualified and placed second. Eminency was declared the winner of the event.

== See also ==
- List of American and Canadian Graded races
