= Transylvania Stakes =

- Class: Grade III
- Location: Keeneland; Lexington, Kentucky, United States
- Inaugurated: 1989
- Race type: Thoroughbred – Flat racing
- Sponsor: Kentucky Utilities (since 2018)
- Website: Keeneland

Race information
- Distance: 1 1/16 miles
- Surface: Turf
- Track: Left-handed
- Qualification: Three-year-olds
- Weight: 123 lbs with allowances
- Purse: $600,000 (2025)

The Transylvania Stakes is a Grade III American Thoroughbred horse race for three-year-olds over a distance of 1 1/16 miles on the turf held annually in early April at Keeneland Race Course, Lexington, Kentucky during the spring meeting. It currently offers a purse of $600,000.

== History ==
The Transylvania Stakes is named for the heavily forested region of western Virginia known as the Transylvania Colony, which became most of Kentucky in 1792. Also Transylvania University is located in Lexington.

The event was inaugurated on 8 April 1989 and was won by Shy Tom who was trained by the Hall of Fame trainer D. Wayne Lukas and owned by William T. Young with strong stretch run in a time of 1:50 flat over the 1 1/16 miles distance. The event was shortened to a mile in 1996 and returned to the original distance in 2008.

The event was upgraded to Grade III event in 2003

In 2008 and 2014 the event was moved off the turf due to inclement weather and held on the all weather track.

== Records ==
Speed record

- 1 1/16 miles: 1:39.46 – Stormalory (2009)
- 1 mile: 1:34.65 – Dog Watch (GB) (1998)

Margins

- 5 1/2 lengths – Silver Max (2012)

Most wins by a jockey

- 4 – Shane Sellers (1991, 1994, 1999, 2003)

Most wins by a trainer

- 4 – William I. Mott (1995, 2001, 2007, 2009)

Most wins by an owner

- 2 - Stuart S. Janney III (2011, 2021)
- 2 - Amerman Racing (2005, 2025)

== Winners ==
Year	Winner	Jockey	Trainer	Owner	Distance	Time	Purse	Grade	Ref
2026	Remember Mamba	José L. Ortiz	Cherie DeVaux	C R K Stable	1 1/16 miles	1:44.49	$589,500	III	
2025	Test Score	Manuel Franco	H. Graham Motion	Amerman Racing	1 1/16 miles	1:43.84	$597,500	III	
2024	Neat	Reylu Gutierrez	Robert Atras	Red White and Blue Racing	1 1/16 miles	1:44.93	$397,263	III	
2023	Mo Stash	Luis Saez	Victoria H. Oliver	BBN Racing	1 1/16 miles	1:43.05	$396,250	III	
2022	Sy Dog	Irad Ortiz Jr.	H. Graham Motion	Head of Plains Partners	1 1/16 miles	1:45.38	$390,125	III	
2021	Scarlett Sky	Joel Rosario	Claude R. McGaughey III	Stuart S. Janney III	1 1/16 miles	1:43.89	$150,000	III	
2020	Field Pass	Ricardo Santana Jr.	Michael J. Maker	Three Diamonds Farm	1 1/16 miles	1:42.56	$100,000	III	
2019	Avie's Flatter	Javier Castellano	Josie Carroll	Ivan Dalos	1 1/16 miles	1:42.86	$150,000	III	
2018	Analyze It	José L. Ortiz	Chad C. Brown	William H. Lawrence	1 1/16 miles	1:45.60	$150,000	III	
2017	Big Score	Javier Castellano	Tim Yakteen	George Krikorian	1 1/16 miles	1:43.23	$150,000	III	
2016	Shakhimat	Emma-Jayne Wilson	Roger L. Attfield	Dan Gale & Richard Hogan	1 1/16 miles	1:42.65	$100,000	III	
2015	Night Prowler	Javier Castellano	Chad C. Brown	Paul Pompa Jr.	1 1/16 miles	1:44.03	$100,000	III	
2014	Medal Count	Robby Albarado	Dale L. Romans	Spendthrift Farm	1 1/16 miles	1:43.35	$100,000	III	Off turf
2013	Jack Milton	John R. Velazquez	Todd A. Pletcher	Gary Barber	1 1/16 miles	1:41.80	$100,000	III	
2012	Silver Max	Robby Albarado	Dale L. Romans	Mark Bacon & Dana Wells	1 1/16 miles	1:41.81	$100,000	III	
2011	Air Support	Rajiv Maragh	Claude R. McGaughey III	Stuart S. Janney III	1 1/16 miles	1:41.99	$100,000	III	
2010	Nordic Truce	Julien R. Leparoux	Christophe Clement	Ammerland Stud	1 1/16 miles	1:41.31	$100,000	III	
2009	Stormalory	Julien R. Leparoux	William I. Mott	Darley Stable	1 1/16 miles	1:39.46	$150,000	III	
2008	Boss Lafitte	Robby Albarado	Thomas M. Amoss	Uptown Racing	1 1/16 miles	1:44.43	$150,000	III	Off turf
2007	Marcavelly	Edgar S. Prado	William I. Mott	Zayat Stables	1 mile	1:36.98	$150,000	III	
2006	Chin High	Shaun Bridgmohan	Neil L. Pessin	Ike Thrash	1 mile	1:37.87	$150,000	III	
2005	Chattahoochee War	Jerry D. Bailey	Robert J. Frankel	Amerman Racing	abt. 1 mile	1:35.28	$150,000	III	
2004	Timo	Edgar S. Prado	William Badgett Jr.	C. K. Woods Stable	1 mile	1:36.52	$113,400	III	
2003	White Cat	Shane Sellers	Kenneth G. McPeek	Raymond H. Cottrell Sr.	1 mile	1:34.98	$100,000	III	
2002	Flying Dash (GER)	Jerry D. Bailey	Neil D. Drysdale	Fusao Sekiguchi	1 mile	1:35.69	$100,000	Listed	
2001	Baptize	Jerry D. Bailey	William I. Mott	Gary & Mary West Stables	1 mile	1:35.28	$113,800	Listed	
2000	Field Cat	Mike E. Smith	Kim Boniface	James S. Karp	1 mile	1:35.19	$113,900	Listed	
1999	Good Night	Shane Sellers	Frank L. Brothers	Claiborne Farm & Adele B. Dilschneider	1 mile	1:35.00	$113,400	Listed	
1998	Dog Watch (GB)	Robbie Davis	Christophe Clement	Lord Hartington	1 mile	1:34.65	$73,840	Listed	
1997	Near the Bank	Pat Day	Denis W. Roberson	Clarence R. Smith & Robert W. Roberts	1 mile	1:36.53	$71,370	Listed	
1996	More Royal	Julie Krone	Jonathan E. Sheppard	Augustin Stable	1 mile	1:35.92	$69,680	Listed	
1995	† Crimson Guard	Mike E. Smith	William I. Mott	Calumet Farm	1 1/16 miles	1:44.04	$68,160	Listed	
1994	Star of Manila	Shane Sellers	Burk Kessinger Jr.	New Phoenix Stable	1 1/16 miles	1:42.87	$54,250	Listed	
1993	Proud Shot	Herb McCauley	Frank A. Alexander	Jill Robinson	1 1/16 miles	1:44.17	$55,425	Listed	
1992	Casino Magistrate	Ricardo D. Lopez	Thomas J. Kelly	Blue Goose Stable	1 1/16 miles	1:46.62	$54,825	Listed	
1991	Eastern Dude	Shane Sellers	Carl A. Nafzger	Frances A Genter Stable	1 1/16 miles	1:42.94	$56,175	Listed	
1990	Izvestia	Randy Romero	Roger L. Attfield	Kinghaven Farms	1 1/16 miles	1:43.80	$55,450		
1989	Shy Tom	Randy Romero	D. Wayne Lukas	William T. Young	1 1/16 miles	1:50.00	$54,050		

Legend:

Turf All Weather Track
Notes:
† Ops Smile was first past the post but was disqualified for interference in the straight and was placed eighth. Crimson Guard was declared the winner.

== See also ==
- List of American and Canadian Graded races
