= A Case of You (horse) =

Irish Thoroughbred racehorse

- Sire: Hot Streak
- Grandsire: Iffraaj
- Dam: Karjera
- Damsire: Key of Luck
- Sex: Colt
- Foaled: 27 March 2018
- Country: Ireland
- Colour: Bay
- Breeder: Limestone & Tara Studs
- Owner: John C McConnell; Gary Devlin
- Trainer: John C McConnell; Adrian McGuinness
- Record: 11: 5-1-2
- Earnings: £326,847

Major wins
- Anglesey Stakes (2020); Lacken Stakes (2021); Prix de l'Abbaye (2021); Al Quoz Sprint (2022)

A Case of You (foaled 27 March 2018) is an Irish Thoroughbred racehorse. He showed high class form as a two-year-old in 2020 when he won two of his three races included the Group 3 Anglesey Stakes. In the following year he improved to become a leading sprinter, winning the Lacken Stakes and running second in the Flying Five Stakes before taking the Group 1 Prix de l'Abbaye. He won the Al Quoz Sprint in 2022.

== Background ==
A Case of You is a bay colt with a white star bred in Ireland by Limestone and Tara Studs. In October 2019 the colt was consigned to the Goffs Sportsman's Yearling Sale but failed to reach his reserve price of €3,000. He was subsequently acquired by John C McConnell who took the horse into training at Stamullen, County Meath. The horse shares his name with a song by Joni Mitchell.

He was from the second crop of foals sired by Hot Streak, a sprinter who won the Cornwallis Stakes in 2013 and the Temple Stakes in 2014. A Case of You's dam Karjera showed little racing ability, failing to win in eight starts. She was a female-line descendant of the California-bred broodmare Amerigo's Fancy, making her a distant relative of Makybe Diva and Canford Cliffs.

== Racing career ==
=== 2020: two-year-old season ===
A Case of You began his racing career in a one mile maiden race at Bellewstown on 26 August when he started at odds of 15/2 and finished third behind Win Win Fighter, beaten four and a half lengths by the winner. In a maiden over seven furlongs on heavy ground at Down Royal nine days later he was ridden by Colin Keane and recorded his first success as he took the lead approaching the final furlong and won "comfortably" by two and a half lengths from Earls Rock. On 11 October at the Curragh the colt was stepped up in class but dropped in distance for the Group 3 Anglesey Stakes over six and a half furlongs and went off the 6/1 third choice in the betting behind the Aidan O'Brien-trained contenders Preamble and Lippizaner. Ridden by Gary Carroll, A Case of You disputed the lead from the start, gained the advantage at half way and stayed on well in the closing stages to win by one and a quarter lengths from Lippizaner. John McConnell commented "Usually if I have a good horse I stay away from the Curragh because the competition is so good but he justified coming here and was impressive. It's my first Group winner on the Flat... He's my own and I'd love to sell him. It would be great to sell him and stay in the yard. I wouldn't be surprised if he gets faster and faster and the dream could be something like a Commonwealth Cup."

=== 2021: three-year-old season ===
Before the start of the 2021 season A Case Of You was bought by Gary Devlin and transferred to the training stable of Adrian McGuinness at Lusk, County Dublin. On his first appearance for his new connections, the colt started 10/11 favourite for a minor race over six furlongs on the synthetic polytrack surface at Dundalk Stadium on 19 March. Ridden by Ronan Whelan he took the lead approaching and went clear of his opponents to win "readily" by three and three quarter lengths from Logo Hunter. In the following month A Case of You started favourite for the Listed 2,000 Guineas Trial Stakes over seven furlongs Leopardstown Racecourse but after being in contention for most of the way he hung badly to the right in the straight and came home last of the twelve runners behind. Poetic Flare. Whelan was again in the saddle when A Case of You contested the Group 3 Lacken Stakes over six furlongs at Naas Racecourse on 16 May and started second choice in the betting his old rival Lippizaner. In a rough race, A Case of You tracked the leaders before finishing strongly and prevailed in a blanket finish by a neck, a head and a neck from Mooneista, Power Under Me and Laws of Indices. The placings of the second and third placed finishers were reversed after a stewards' inquiry. Adrian McGuiness commented "We gave him a break after Leopardstown where we were a bit disappointed with him. He pulled hard that day and we said we’d drop him back to sprinting. Obviously that is his forte, he had to dig deep there today and he’s tough. I think he’ll improve a little bit as I haven’t been very hard on him."

A Case of You moved to the highest level for the Group 1 Commonwealth Cup at Royal Ascot in June but finished eleventh of the fifteen runners after losing a shoe in the race. Victory went to the American filly Campanelle when the first-place finisher Dragon Symbol was disqualified. Following a break of over seven weeks, the colt returned in the Group 3 Phoenix Sprint Stakes over six furlongs at the Curragh on 8 August when he was matched against older horses and came home third behind the five-year-old Gustavus Weston. On 5 September at the Curragh A Case of You started a 33/1 outsider when he was dropped back in distance for the Group 1 Flying Five Stakes. Ridden by Whelan, he was towards the rear in the early stages before producing a strong late run to finish second, half a length behind the six-year-old mare Romantic Proposal.

For his last start of the season in Europe A Case of You was sent to France for the Group 1 Prix de l'Abbaye over 1000 metres on heavy ground at Longchamp Racecourse on 3 October when he was partnered by Whelan and started at odds of 10.8/1. The King George Stakes winner Suesa started favourite while the other twelve runners included Glass Slippers, Winter Power, Romantic Proposal, Berneuil (Prix du Petit Couvert), Pradaro (Prix du Gros Chene), Dandalla (Duchess of Cambridge Stakes) and Air de Valse (2020 Prix du Petit Couvert). A Case of You raced in mid-division before coming under pressure at half way and then began to make progress 300 metres from the finish. The five-year-old mare Air de Valse had opened up a clear advantage but the Irish colt maintained his run, caught the leader on the line and won by a short head. After the race McGuinness said "The Flying Five was his first time over five furlongs and he's just got better and better. He'll be a very good horse next year... I ran him at Ascot and he wasn't right, but I knew he was right here. I can't believe it. I knew he'd definitely improved because I've a good sprinter at home and he can't lay up with him. He's coped with the ground, but I think he'll be better on good. We're definitely going to look at the Breeders' Cup, but we'll see how he is."

As McGuinness had suggested, A Case of You ended his season with a trip to California to contest the Breeders' Cup Turf Sprint over five furlongs at Del Mar Racetrack on November 6. Racing on firm ground he raced in mid-division before staying on in the straight but never looked likely to win and came home fifth behind Golden Pal.

== Pedigree ==
Pedigree of A Case of You (IRE), bay colt 2018
Sire Hot Streak (IRE) 2011	Iffraaj (GB); 2001	Zafonic (USA)	Gone West
Sire Hot Streak (IRE) 2011	Iffraaj (GB); 2001	Zafonic (USA)	Zaizafon
Sire Hot Streak (IRE) 2011	Iffraaj (GB); 2001	Pastorale	Nureyev (USA)
Sire Hot Streak (IRE) 2011	Iffraaj (GB); 2001	Pastorale	Park Appeal (IRE)
Sire Hot Streak (IRE) 2011	Ashirah (USA); 1995	Housebuster	Mt Livermore
Sire Hot Streak (IRE) 2011	Ashirah (USA); 1995	Housebuster	Big Dreams
Sire Hot Streak (IRE) 2011	Ashirah (USA); 1995	Manwah	Lyphard
Sire Hot Streak (IRE) 2011	Ashirah (USA); 1995	Manwah	Height of Fashion (FR)
Dam Karjera (IRE) 2008	Key of Luck (USA); 1991	Chief's Crown	Danzig
Dam Karjera (IRE) 2008	Key of Luck (USA); 1991	Chief's Crown	Six Crowns
Dam Karjera (IRE) 2008	Key of Luck (USA); 1991	Balbonella (FR)	Gay Mecene (USA)
Dam Karjera (IRE) 2008	Key of Luck (USA); 1991	Balbonella (FR)	Bamieres
Dam Karjera (IRE) 2008	Lock's Heath (CAN); 1990	Topsider (USA)	Northern Dancer (CAN)
Dam Karjera (IRE) 2008	Lock's Heath (CAN); 1990	Topsider (USA)	Drumtop
Dam Karjera (IRE) 2008	Lock's Heath (CAN); 1990	Lock's Dream (USA)	Youth
Dam Karjera (IRE) 2008	Lock's Heath (CAN); 1990	Lock's Dream (USA)	Trillionaire (Family: 9-f)
