= Eddie Logan Stakes =

- Class: Listed
- Location: Santa Anita Park; Arcadia, California, United States
- Inaugurated: 2006
- Race type: Thoroughbred - Flat racing
- Website: www.santaanita.com

Race information
- Distance: 1 mile (8 furlongs)
- Surface: Dirt
- Track: Left-handed
- Qualification: Two-year-olds
- Purse: $100,000

The Eddie Logan Stakes is an American Thoroughbred horse race for two-year-olds run at the Santa Anita Park in Arcadia, California late in the year. A Listed stakes, it's set at a distance of 1 mile on the turf, and currently offers a purse of $100,000 plus.

Begun in 2006, this race is named for Eddie Logan (May 20, 1910 - January 31, 2009), the "foot man," who worked at the track for 74 years, beginning on the track's opening day: December 24, 1934, shining shoes and cheering hearts. Logan was in the winner's circle to present the first winning trophy.

This race was formerly known as the Hill Rise Stakes. In 2002 Peace Rules won, with Singletary placing.

== Past winners ==
- 2026 - Stark Contrast (Kazushi Kimura)
- 2015 - Path of David (Joseph Talamo)
- 2014 - Bolo (Mike E. Smith)
- 2013 - Enterprising
- 2012 - Avare
- 2011 - Chips All In (Alonso Quinonez)
- 2010 - Silver Medallion
- 2009 - Macias (Victor Espinoza)
- 2008 - Flashmans Papers (GB) (Rafael Bejarano)
- 2007 - Yankee Bravo (Alex Solis)
- 2006 - Kolo (Jose Valdivia, Jr.)

== As the Hill Rise Stakes ==
- 2005 - Chattahoochee War (Rafael Bejarano)
- 2004 - Objective
- 2003 -
- 2002 - Peace Rules (Victor Espinoza)
- 2001 - Jamaican Rum
- 2000 - The Deputy
- 1998 - Ladies Din (multiple Grade I stakes winner)
- 1997 - Greed is Good
- 1996 - Al Mamoon (multiple graded stakes winner)
