= Naughty Jake =

American-bred Thoroughbred racehorse

Naughty Jake (foaled 1972) was a thoroughbred race horse owned by Jake Bachelor of Louisville, Kentucky. Bachelor's decision not to enter Naughty Jake in the 1975 Kentucky Derby is historic. Had he done so, it would have been the first horse owned by an African American to enter the event since 1943. In 1943 Burnt Cork, owned by Eddie 'Rochester' Anderson, valet of Jack Benny, achieved the distinction of becoming the initial horse owned by a black person to run in the Kentucky Derby.

== Missed opportunity ==
By May 1975 Naughty Jake had earned $42,475. He was the best horse Bachelor had owned after becoming an owner in 1966. Bachelor decided to hold Naughty Jake out of the 1975 Kentucky Derby after finding out that the weather forecast for Churchill Downs called for fair skies. Bachelor was skeptical of Naughty Jake's prospects for a good finish. He also would have had to pay $7,500 in entry and starting fees on top of a $100 nominating fee.

Bachelor chose to enter Naughty Jake in the ninth race following the Kentucky Derby, the $25,000 "Needles". The thoroughbred placed fourth. Bachelor faced criticism for his decision but a research company of the mid-1970s evaluated him as one of the most successful people involved in horse racing, according to percentages. Bachelor said of the horse, "I'll probably never get another horse of Naughty Jake's caliber."

Naughty Jake was the second choice of many, after Round Stake, to win the 1975 Derby Trial. The Trial, a one-mile event which began in 1938, was run on April 29, 1975. Naughty Jake was ridden by German Vasquez.
