= Michael J. Maker =

American horse trainer

Mike Maker
Personal information
- Born: February 7, 1969 (age 57) Garden City, Michigan, United States
- Occupation: Race Horse Trainer

Horse racing career
- Sport: Horse racing
- Career wins: 3,700+ (ongoing)

Major racing wins
- Hawthorne Gold Cup Handicap (2004); Churchill Downs Stakes (2009); Kentucky Cup Classic Stakes (2009); Lane's End Stakes (2006, 2010); Blue Grass Stakes (2010); Cornhusker Handicap (2011); Edgewood Stakes (2013); Black Gold Stakes(2016); Louisiana Derby (2015); H. Allen Jerkens Stakes (2017, 2018); Pegasus World Cup Turf (2020, 2023); United Nations Stakes (2017, 2020, 2023); Black Eyed Susan (2021); Pimlico Special (2021); Maryland Sprint (2021); American Turf Stakes (2020, 2022); Mint Million Stakes (2022); Mac Diarmida Stakes (2019, 2020, 2022, 2023); Man o' War Stakes (2023); Gulfstream Park Mile Stakes (2023); Fred W. Hooper Stakes (2023) Canadian Stakes wins: Queen's Plate (2016) Breeders' Cup wins: Breeders' Cup Dirt Mile (2009); Breeders' Cup Juvenile (2011); Breeders' Cup Juvenile Turf (2020)

Significant horses
- Furthest Land, Hansen, International Star, Sir Dudley Digges, Stately Victor, With a City, Zulu Alpha, Admiral Kitten, Somelikeithotbrown, Bigger Picture, Henley's Joy, Army Wife, Fire At Will, Cross Border, Aquaphobia, Oscar Nominated

Michael J. Maker (born February 7, 1969) is an American trainer of Thoroughbred racehorses. The son of a trainer, he learned the business from his father then set up his own public stable in 1991. In 1993 he went to work as an assistant to U.S. Racing Hall of Fame trainer D. Wayne Lukas where he remained until going out on his own again in 2003.

Mike Maker's most important wins came with Furthest Land in the 2009 Breeders' Cup Dirt Mile, the 2011 Breeders' Cup Juvenile with Hansen who would earn American Champion Two-Year-Old Colt honors, and the 2020 Breeders' Cup Juvenile Turf with Fire At Will. In 2010 he won the Blue Grass Stakes with the colt Stately Victor which qualified him for the Kentucky Derby.
