= American Turf Stakes =

Horse race

- Class: Grade I
- Location: Churchill Downs; Louisville, Kentucky, United States
- Inaugurated: 1992
- Race type: Thoroughbred - Flat racing
- Sponsor: Ford (2025)
- Website: Churchill Downs

Race information
- Distance: 1 1/16 miles
- Surface: Turf
- Track: Left-handed
- Qualification: Three-year-olds
- Weight: 123lbs with allowances
- Purse: $1,000,000 (2025)

The American Turf Stakes is a Grade I American Thoroughbred horse race for three-year-olds run over a distance of 1 1/16 miles on turf held annually in early May on the Kentucky Derby day meeting at Churchill Downs in Louisville, Kentucky during the spring meeting.

== History ==
The event was inaugurated on 2 May 1992 as the fourth race on the undercard of the Kentucky Derby day meeting. The event was won by Senor Tomas who run as a Peter Vestal trained entry with Correntino in a time of 1:43.10.

The event was sponsored by Crown Royal from 1995 to 1998 and more recently by Ram Trucks from 2011 to 2019.

The event was classified as Grade III in 1998. In 2010, the American Graded Stakes Committee upgraded the race to Grade II status. In 2025, the Thoroughbred Owners and Breeders Association upgraded the classification further to its current status as a Grade I race.

The most notable winner of the event is the 2004 winner Kitten's Joy who as a three-year-old went on to finish second in the Breeders' Cup Turf to Better Talk Now and was voted as the U.S. Champion Male Turf Horse. His offspring have won this event three times: Banned (2011), Divisidero (2015) and Camelot Kitten (2016).

From 2024, the winner of the race will receive a wildcard entry for the Epsom Derby.

== Records ==
Speed record:

- 1 1/16 miles: 1:40.31 - Stark Contrast (2026)

Margins

- 4 1/2 lengths - Banned (2011)

Most wins by a jockey:

- 4 - Flavien Prat (2021, 2022, 2025, 2026)

Most wins by a trainer:

- 4 - Chad C. Brown (2013, 2016, 2019, 2025)

Most wins by an owner:

- 2 - Thomas Carey (1992, 1994)
- 2 - Kenneth and Sarah Ramsey (2008, 2011)
- 2 - Glen Hill Farm (2011, 2014)
- 2 - Amerman Racing (2024, 2026)

== Winners ==
| Year | Winner | Jockey | Trainer | Owner | Distance | Time | Purse | Grade | Ref |
|---|---|---|---|---|---|---|---|---|---|
| 2026 | Stark Contrast | Flavien Prat | Michael W. McCarthy | Amerman Racing | 1 1/16 miles | 1:40.31 | $999,750 | I | |
| 2025 | Zulu Kingdom (IRE) | Flavien Prat | Chad C. Brown | Madaket Stables, Michael Dubb, William Strauss & Michael J. Caruso | 1 1/16 miles | 1:41.64 | $924,780 | I | |
| 2024 | Trikari | Umberto Rispoli | H. Graham Motion | Amerman Racing | 1 1/16 miles | 1:43.59 | $596,560 | II | |
| 2023 | Webslinger | Javier Castellano | Mark E. Casse | D. J. Stable | 1 1/16 miles | 1:41.54 | $500,000 | II | |
| 2022 | Stolen Base | Flavien Prat | Michael J. Maker | Three Diamonds Farm & Deuce Greathouse | 1 1/16 miles | 1:44.57 | $500,000 | II | |
| 2021 | Du Jour | Flavien Prat | Bob Baffert | Debbie Lanni & Natalie J. Baffert | 1 1/16 miles | 1:42.49 | $500,000 | II | |
| 2020 | Fancy Liquor | Florent Geroux | Michael J. Maker | SkyChai Racing & Sand Dollar Stable | 1 1/16 miles | 1:42.83 | $500,000 | II | |
| 2019 | Digital Age (IRE) | Irad Ortiz Jr. | Chad C. Brown | Klaravich Stables | 1 1/16 miles | 1:44.63 | $400,000 | II | |
| 2018 | Maraud | John R. Velazquez | Todd A. Pletcher | Treadway Racing Stable | 1 1/16 miles | 1:47.52 | $300,000 | II | |
| 2017 | Arklow | Mike E. Smith | Brad H. Cox | Donegal Racing | 1 1/16 miles | 1:44.45 | $300,000 | II | |
| 2016 | Camelot Kitten | Irad Ortiz Jr. | Chad C. Brown | Kenneth and Sarah Ramsey | 1 1/16 miles | 1:41.13 | $300,000 | II | |
| 2015 | Divisidero | Rafael Manuel Hernandez | William B. Bradley | Gunpowder Farms | 1 1/16 miles | 1:41.59 | $250,000 | II | |
| 2014 | Global View | Gary L. Stevens | Thomas F. Proctor | Glen Hill Farm | 1 1/16 miles | 1:41.65 | $294,500 | II | |
| 2013 | Noble Tune | Javier Castellano | Chad C. Brown | Martin S. Schwartz & Dell Ridge Farm | 1 1/16 miles | 1:41.63 | $234,200 | II | |
| 2012 | Silver Max | Rafael Bejarano | Dale L. Romans | Mark Bacon & Dana Wells | 1 1/16 miles | 1:41.10 | $238,200 | II | |
| 2011 | Banned | Garrett K. Gomez | Thomas F. Proctor | Glen Hill Farm | 1 1/16 miles | 1:42.05 | $237,400 | II | |
| 2010 | Doubles Partner | Garrett K. Gomez | Todd A. Pletcher | WinStar Farm | 1 1/16 miles | 1:41.05 | $200,550 | II | |
| 2009 | Orthodox | Jon Court | John Glenney | Kim and John Glenney | 1 1/16 miles | 1:44.37 | $170,400 | III | |
| 2008 | Tizdejavu | Garrett K. Gomez | Gregory Fox | Michael L Cooper & Pamela C. Ziebarth | 1 1/16 miles | 1:46.14 | $181,950 | III | |
| 2007 | Duveen | Mark Guidry | Dale L. Romans | Andrew Farm | 1 1/16 miles | 1:44.03 | $188,700 | III | |
| 2006 | Stream Cat | Julien R. Leparoux | Patrick L. Biancone | Fab Oak Stable, Robert M. Hurley & John F. Goldthorp | 1 1/16 miles | 1:42.27 | $114,300 | III | |
| 2005 | Rey de Cafe | Javier Castellano | George R. Arnold II | G. Watts Humphrey Jr. | 1 1/16 miles | 1:42.00 | $114,700 | III | |
| 2004 | Kitten's Joy | Jerry D. Bailey | Dale L. Romans | Kenneth and Sarah Ramsey | 1 1/16 miles | 1:43.21 | $113,800 | III | |
| 2003 | Senor Swinger | Pat Day | Bob Baffert | Robert B. & Beverly Lewis | 1 1/16 miles | 1:41.38 | $121,400 | III | |
| 2002 | Legislator | Edgar S. Prado | H. James Bond | Judy E. Turetsky | 1 1/16 miles | 1:44.43 | $116,300 | III | |
| 2001 | Strategic Partner | John R. Velazquez | Mark A. Hennig | Lee Lewis | 1 1/16 miles | 1:42.89 | $117,900 | III | |
| 2000 | King Cugat | Jerry D. Bailey | William I. Mott | Centennial Farms | 1 1/16 miles | 1:41.25 | $118,100 | III | |
| 1999 | Air Rocket | Jerry D. Bailey | Robert E. Holthus | Frank Fletcher & Dan Jones | 1 1/16 miles | 1:42.65 | $115,400 | III | |
| 1998 | Dernier Croise (FR) | Gary L. Stevens | Thomas M. Amoss | Richard Colton Jr. | 1 1/16 miles | 1:44.28 | $126,000 | III | |
| 1997 | Royal Strand (IRE) | Pat Day | W. Elliott Walden | James H. Stone | 1 1/16 miles | 1:40.93 | $115,800 | Listed | |
| 1996 | Broadway Beau | Chris McCarron | W. Elliott Walden | George De Benedicty & Dr. Brian Davidson | 1 1/16 miles | 1:41.87 | $117,500 | Listed | |
| 1995 | Unanimous Vote (IRE) | Gary L. Stevens | Thomas M. Amoss | Robert Sabinske | 1 1/16 miles | 1:42.07 | $118,000 | Listed | |
| 1994 | Jaggery John | Mike E. Smith | Peter M. Vestal | Thomas M. Carey | 1 1/16 miles | 1:45.05 | $86,850 | Listed | |
| 1993 | † Desert Waves | Shane Sellers | James E. Day | Sam Son Farm | 1 1/16 miles | 1:42.64 | $56,350 | Listed | |
| 1992 | § Senor Tomas | Mike E. Smith | Peter M. Vestal | Thomas M. Carey | 1 1/16 miles | 1:43.10 | $57,600 | Listed | |

Notes:
§ Ran as an entry
† In the 1993 running Compadre was first past the post but hung in the straight causing interference to the second-place finisher Desert Waves and was disqualified and placed second.

== See also ==
- List of American and Canadian Graded races
