= Silver Deputy =

Canadian-bred Thoroughbred racehorse

- Sire: Deputy Minister
- Grandsire: Vice Regent
- Dam: Silver Valley
- Damsire: Mr. Prospector
- Sex: Stallion
- Foaled: 1985
- Country: Canada
- Colour: Dark bay/brown
- Breeder: International Thoroughbred Breeders, Inc.
- Owner: Windfields Farm
- Trainer: Macdonald Benson
- Record: 2: 2-0-0
- Earnings: Can$41,820

Major wins
- Swynford Stakes (1998)

Honours
- Silver Deputy Stakes at Woodbine Racetrack

Silver Deputy (February 25, 1985, in Ontario – October 4, 2014) was a Canadian Thoroughbred racehorse best known as a top sire in North America. He was a son of Deputy Minister, who was an Eclipse and Sovereign Award winning runner and the 1997/98 Leading sire in North America. His dam was Silver Valley, a daughter of Mr. Prospector, the 1987/88 Leading sire in North America and nine-time Leading broodmare sire in North America.

Silver Deputy was purchased for $200,000 by Windfields Farm of Oshawa, Ontario at the Fasig-Tipton July 1986 select yearling auction in Kentucky. After he won the Grade III Swynford Stakes at Woodbine Racetrack, an injury ended his racing career and he began stallion duty in 1989. He initially stood at stud Windfields Farm in Canada, but his immediate success led to demand from United States breeders and he was sent to stand at Brookdale Farm near Versailles, Kentucky, where he became one of the most consistent stallions in the state.

== Stud record ==
A sire of more than 75 stakes winners, Silver Deputy produced Hall of Fame inductee Silverbulletday. His other top runners include:

- Archers Bay, 1998 Canadian Champion Three-Year-Old Male Horse, won Queen's Plate, Prince of Wales Stakes
- Atago Taisho, millionaire multiple stakes winner in Japan
- Badge of Silver, millionaire multiple stakes winner in the United States
- Bare Necessities, millionaire multiple stakes winner in the United States
- Crown Attorney, multiple stakes winner in Canada. Career earnings of US$993,959
- Deputy Jane West, Canadian Champion Two-Year-Old Filly & Canadian Champion Three-Year-Old Filly
- Larkwhistle, Canadian Champion Two-Year-Old Filly
- Divine Silver, multi-millionaire multiple stakes winner in Japan
- Mr. Jester, multiple stakes winner in the United States. Career earnings of US$785,400
- Poetically, Canadian Champion Two-Year-Old Filly
- Pool Land, stakes wins include G1 Ruffian Handicap
- Pool Play, stakes wins include G1 Stephen Foster Handicap
- Posse, multiple stakes winner in the United States. Career earnings of US$662,841
- Al's Deputy, multiple stakes winner gelding in the United States, including winning George W. Barker Handicap (Black Type)[winner of US$218,025
- Scotzanna, Canadian Champion Three-Year-Old Filly & Canadian Champion Sprint Horse
- Silver Ticket, multiple stakes winner in Canada. Career earnings of US$549,170
- Silverbulletday, American Champion Two-Year-Old Filly & American Champion Three-Year-Old Filly, National Museum of Racing and Hall of Fame

Silver Deputy was pensioned in September 2008.

== Pedigree ==
Pedigree of Silver Deputy, Dark Bay/Brown stallion, 1985
Sire Deputy Minister	Vice Regent	Northern Dancer	Nearctic
Sire Deputy Minister	Vice Regent	Northern Dancer	Natalma
Sire Deputy Minister	Vice Regent	Victoria Regina	Menetrier
Sire Deputy Minister	Vice Regent	Victoria Regina	Victoriana
Sire Deputy Minister	Mint Copy	Bunty's Flight	Bunty Lawless
Sire Deputy Minister	Mint Copy	Bunty's Flight	Broomflight
Sire Deputy Minister	Mint Copy	Shakney	Jabneh
Sire Deputy Minister	Mint Copy	Shakney	Grass Shack
Dam Silver Valley	Mr. Prospector	Raise a Native	Native Dancer
Dam Silver Valley	Mr. Prospector	Raise a Native	Raise You
Dam Silver Valley	Mr. Prospector	Gold Digger	Nashua
Dam Silver Valley	Mr. Prospector	Gold Digger	Sequence
Dam Silver Valley	Seven Valleys	Road At Sea	Bald Eagle
Dam Silver Valley	Seven Valleys	Road At Sea	Hard-a-Lee
Dam Silver Valley	Seven Valleys	Proud Pied	Seven Corners
Dam Silver Valley	Seven Valleys	Proud Pied	Ancient History (family: 2-s)
