= Breeders' Cup Turf top three finishers =

This is a listing of the horses that finished in either first, second, or third place and the number of starters in the Breeders' Cup Turf, a grade one race run on grass held on Saturday of the Breeders' Cup World Thoroughbred Championships.

Year	Winner	Second	Third	Starters
2026	Benvenuto Cellini	Map Of Stars	Diamond Necklace	14
2025	Ethical Diamond	Rebel’s Romance	El Cordobes	14
2024	Rebel’s Romance	Rousham Park	Shahryar	13
2023	Auguste Rodin	Up to the Mark	Shahryar	10
2022	Rebel's Romance	Stone Age	War Like Goddess	13
2021	Yibir	Broome	Teona	14
2020	Tarnawa	Magical	Channel Maker	10
2019	Bricks and Mortar	United	Anthony Van Dyck	12
2018	Enable	Magical	Sadler's Joy	13
2017	Talismanic	Beach Patrol	Highland Reel	13
2016	Highland Reel	Flintshire	Found	13
2015	Found	Golden Horn	Big Blue Kitten	12
2014	Main Sequence	Flintshire	Twilight Eclipse	12
2013	Magician	The Fugue	Indy Point	12
2012	Little Mike	Point of Entry	St Nicholas Abbey	12
2011	St Nicholas Abbey	Sea Moon	Brilliant Speed	9
2010	Dangerous Midge	Champ Pegasus	Behkabad	7
2009	Conduit	Presious Passion	Dar Re Mi	7
2008	Conduit	Eagle Mountain	Dancing Forever	11
2007	English Channel	Shamdinan	Red Rocks	8
2006	Red Rocks	Better Talk Now	English Channel	10
2005	Shirocco	Ace	Azamour	13
2004	Better Talk Now	Kitten's Joy	Powerscourt	8
2003	†High Chaparral; Johar		Falbrav	9
2002	High Chaparral	With Anticipation	Falcon Flight	8
2001	Fantastic Light	Milan	Timboroa	11
2000	Kalanisi	Quiet Resolve	John's Call	13
1999	Daylami	Royal Anthem	Buck's Boy	14
1998	Buck's Boy	Yagli	Dushyantor	13
1997	Chief Bearhart	Borgia	Flag Down	11
1996	Pilsudski	Singspiel	Swain	14
1995	Northern Spur	Freedom Cry	Carnegie	13
1994	Tikkanen	Hatoof	Paradise Creek	14
1993	Kotashaan	Bien Bien	Luazur	14
1992	Fraise	Sky Classic	Quest for Fame	10
1991	Miss Alleged	Itsallgreektome	Quest for Fame	13
1990	In the Wings	With Approval	El Senor	11
1989	Prized	Sierra Roberta	Star Lift	14
1988	Great Communicator	Sunshine Forever	Indian Skimmer	10
1987	Theatrical	Trempolino	Village Star II	14
1986	Manila	Theatrical	Estrapade	9
1985	Pebbles	Strawberry Road	Mourjane	14
1984	Lashkari	All Along	Raami	11

† Deadheat for first place

== See also ==
- Breeders' Cup World Thoroughbred Championships
