= Manntari =

Irish-bred Thoroughbred racehorse

- Sire: Doyoun
- Grandsire: Mill Reef
- Dam: Manntika
- Damsire: Kalamoun
- Sex: Stallion
- Foaled: 20 February 1991
- Country: Ireland
- Colour: Brown
- Breeder: Aga Khan IV
- Owner: Aga Khan IV
- Trainer: John Oxx
- Record: 4: 3-0-0
- Earnings: £78,477

Major wins
- National Stakes (1993); Leopardstown 2,000 Guineas Trial (1994)

Manntari (20 February 1991 – after 2003) was an Irish Thoroughbred racehorse and sire. In 1993 he won a maiden race on his debut and then produced by far his best performance when he won the Group 1 National Stakes by ten lengths. In the following spring he won the Leopardstown 2,000 Guineas Trial but then ran poorly in the Irish 2,000 Guineas. He was then retired to stud and exported to New Zealand, where he had some success as a sire of winners.

== Background ==
Manntari was a brown horse with a white coronet on his left hind foot bred in Ireland by his owner Aga Khan IV. He was trained during his track career by John Oxx and ridden in all of his races by Johnny Murtagh.

He was from the second crop of foals sired by Doyoun who won the 2000 Guineas and finished third in the 1988 Epsom Derby before becoming a successful breeding stallion whose other progeny included Daylami, Kalanisi and Margarula. Manntari's dam Manntika showed modest racing ability, winning one minor race fromseven starts. She was descended from the French broodmare Makada (foaled 1936) who was the female-line ancestor of many major winners including Danseur (Grand Prix de Paris), Top Ville and La Sega (Prix de Diane).

== Racing career ==
=== 1993: two-year-old season ===
Manntari made his racecourse debut in a maiden race over seven furlongs at Leopardstown Racecourse on 8 August in which he started at odds of 4/1 and won by a length from the Dermot Weld-trained Peace Role. The colt was then stepped up sharply in class for the Group 1 National Stakes over the same distance at the Curragh on 18 September. The British-trained State Performer started the 4/9 favourite after winning the Chesham Stakes and the Rose Bowl Stakes, with Manntari next in the betting alongside Peace Role on 6/1. The other three runners were Musical Insight (also from the Oxx table), City Nights (third in the Futurity Stakes) and the Jim Bolger-trained Clifdon Fog. Manntari dominated the race, leading soon after the start and drawing right away in the last quarter mile to win by ten lengths from City Nights. The Independent's Richard Edmondson described the colt's win as "perhaps the single most devastating" performance seen in Europe that year, while Oxx admitted to being surprised by the colt's victory, given that Manntari had never been particularly impressive in training.

Manntari was scheduled to end his season in the Beresford Stakes at the Curragh in October but was withdrawn from the race owing to the soft ground. He nevertheless went into the break as the betting favourite for the following year's 2000 Guineas.

=== 1994: three-year-old season ===
On his first run as a three-year-old Manntari contested the Leopardstown 2,000 Guineas Trial over one mile on 16 April and started the 8/11 favourite against six opponents. He took the lead from the start and kept on well in the closing stages to win by one and a half lengths and a head from Kly Green and Artema. The form of the race was boosted on 7 May when Artema won the Derrinstown Stud Derby Trial. On 15 May, in the Irish 2,000 Guineas on heavy ground at the Curragh, Manntari started the 5/1 third choice in the betting behind the British challengers Turtle Island and Grand Lodge. He led from the start as usual but faded badly in the straight and came home last of the nine runners.

== Stud record ==
At the end of his racing career Manntari was exported to become a breeding stallion in New Zealand, where his last foals were born in 2004. The best of his offspring was probably the filly Shizu who won The Thousand Guineas in 1999.

== Pedigree ==
Pedigree of Manntari (IRE), brown stallion, 1991
Sire Doyoun (IRE) 1985	Mill Reef (USA); 1968	Never Bend	Nasrullah
Sire Doyoun (IRE) 1985	Mill Reef (USA); 1968	Never Bend	Lalun
Sire Doyoun (IRE) 1985	Mill Reef (USA); 1968	Milan Mill	Princequillo
Sire Doyoun (IRE) 1985	Mill Reef (USA); 1968	Milan Mill	Virginia Water
Sire Doyoun (IRE) 1985	Dumka (FR); 1971	Kashmir	Tudor Melody
Sire Doyoun (IRE) 1985	Dumka (FR); 1971	Kashmir	Queen of Speed
Sire Doyoun (IRE) 1985	Dumka (FR); 1971	Faizebad	Prince Taj
Sire Doyoun (IRE) 1985	Dumka (FR); 1971	Faizebad	Floralie
Dam Manntika (IRE) 1979	Kalamoun (GB); 1970	Zeddaan	Grey Sovereign
Dam Manntika (IRE) 1979	Kalamoun (GB); 1970	Zeddaan	Vareta
Dam Manntika (IRE) 1979	Kalamoun (GB); 1970	Khairunissa	Prince Bio
Dam Manntika (IRE) 1979	Kalamoun (GB); 1970	Khairunissa	Palariva
Dam Manntika (IRE) 1979	Manushka (FR); 1971	Sheshoon	Precipitation
Dam Manntika (IRE) 1979	Manushka (FR); 1971	Sheshoon	Noorani
Dam Manntika (IRE) 1979	Manushka (FR); 1971	Manush	Tanerko
Dam Manntika (IRE) 1979	Manushka (FR); 1971	Manush	Magda (Family: 8-i)
