= Zagreb (horse) =

American-bred Thoroughbred racehorse

- Sire: Theatrical
- Grandsire: Nureyev
- Dam: Sophonisbe
- Damsire: Wollow
- Sex: Stallion
- Foaled: 14 May 1993
- Country: United States
- Colour: Dark Bay or Brown
- Breeder: Allen Paulson
- Owner: Allen Paulson
- Trainer: Dermot Weld
- Record: 4: 2-1-0

Major wins
- Irish Derby (1996)

Zagreb (14 May 1993 – 8 April 2013) was an American-bred, Irish-trained Thoroughbred racehorse and sire. His racing career consisted of only four races as a three-year-old in 1996 and was highlighted by a six length win in the Irish Derby. After his retirement from racing he had some success as a sire of winners in Japan.

== Background ==
Zagreb was a dark bay horse standing 16.2 hands high with no white markings bred in Kentucky by his owner Allen Paulson. He was sired by Theatrical, an Irish-bred horse who won the Breeders' Cup Turf and was named American Champion Male Turf Horse in 1987. At stud he sired several other major winners including Royal Anthem. Zagreb's dam, Sophonisbe was a half-sister to the Breeders' Cup Mile winner Steinlen and closely related to many other major winners including Sagace and Stacelita.

Paulson sent his colt to Europe where he was trained in Ireland by Dermot Weld.

== Racing career ==
=== 1996: three-year-old season ===
Zagreb did not race as a two-year-old in 1995 and made his debut in a ten furlong maiden race at the Curragh on 13 April 1996. Ridden by Mick Kinane, he started favourite against twenty-six opponents and won by a length from the Aga Khan's colt Sharazan. On his second appearance, the colt was matched against older horses in the Quality Beef Stakes over one and a half miles at Leopardstown Racecourse on 12 June. He started 4/7 favourite but finished second of the eight runners, beaten a head by Damancher, a four-year-old colt who had lost all of his previous thirteen races. Pat Shanahan took over the ride when Zagreb started a 20/1 outsider for the Irish Derby at the Curragh eighteen days later. The betting was headed by the Henry Cecil-trained Dushyantor, who had finished second when favourite for The Derby, with the other leading contenders including the 1995 Cartier Champion Two-year-old Colt Alhaarth, the previously undefeated Dr Massini (ridden by Kinane) and the Grand Prix de Saint-Cloud winner Polaris Flight who had been beaten a nose in the Prix du Jockey Club on his previous start. Shanahan settled Zagreb just behind the leaders before turning into the straight in third place behind Private Song and Dusyantor, with Polaris Flight close behind. Zagreb took the lead two furlongs out and was never in any danger of defeat, accelerating away from the field to win by six lengths from Polaris Flight, with another six lengths back to the Aidan O'Brien-trained His Excellence in third. Immediately after the race Shanahan commented "We have always thought a lot of him. I expected Zagreb to run well and I thought he would finish in the first four or five". When asked about his victory eighteen years later, the jockey admitted "What do I recall of the race? Not a lot is the answer - and I don't remember much about the following week either!"

After a break of more than three months, Zagreb returned for France's most prestigious race, the Prix de l'Arc de Triomphe over 2400 metres at Longchamp Racecourse on 6 October. Re-united with Kinane, he started the 6.6/1 third choice in the betting behind Helissio and Swain. Zagreb pulled against Kinane's attempts to restrain him in the early stages, but turned into the straight in third place and maintained his position until the field approached the last 200 metres, but then dropped back quickly and finished thirteenth of the sixteen runners, fourteen lengths behind the winner Helissio.

== Stud record ==
At the end of his racing career, Zagreb was exported to stand as a breeding stallion in Japan. He returned to Ireland a few years later where he was based at the Beechbrook Stud at Tinahely, County Wicklow. The best of his Japanese offspring was Cosmo Bulk who won the Singapore Airlines International Cup in 2006, whilst another of his sons, Cosmo Sunbeam, won Asahi Hai Futurity Stakes in 2003. In Ireland he was mainly used as a National Hunt sire.

== Pedigree ==
Pedigree of Zagreb (USA), bay stallion, 1993
Sire Theatrical (IRE) 1982	Nureyev (USA); 1977	Northern Dancer	Nearctic
Sire Theatrical (IRE) 1982	Nureyev (USA); 1977	Northern Dancer	Natalma
Sire Theatrical (IRE) 1982	Nureyev (USA); 1977	Special	Forli
Sire Theatrical (IRE) 1982	Nureyev (USA); 1977	Special	Thong
Sire Theatrical (IRE) 1982	Tree of Knowledge (IRE); 1977	Sassafras	Sheshoon
Sire Theatrical (IRE) 1982	Tree of Knowledge (IRE); 1977	Sassafras	Ruta
Sire Theatrical (IRE) 1982	Tree of Knowledge (IRE); 1977	Sensibility	Hail To Reason
Sire Theatrical (IRE) 1982	Tree of Knowledge (IRE); 1977	Sensibility	Pange
Dam Sophonisbe (IRE) 1981	Wollow (IRE); 1973	Wolver Hollow	Sovereign Path
Dam Sophonisbe (IRE) 1981	Wollow (IRE); 1973	Wolver Hollow	Cygnet
Dam Sophonisbe (IRE) 1981	Wollow (IRE); 1973	Wichuraiana	Worden
Dam Sophonisbe (IRE) 1981	Wollow (IRE); 1973	Wichuraiana	Excelsa
Dam Sophonisbe (IRE) 1981	Southern Seas (GB); 1975	Jim French	Graustark
Dam Sophonisbe (IRE) 1981	Southern Seas (GB); 1975	Jim French	Dinner Partner
Dam Sophonisbe (IRE) 1981	Southern Seas (GB); 1975	Schönbrunn	Pantheon
Dam Sophonisbe (IRE) 1981	Southern Seas (GB); 1975	Schönbrunn	Scheherazade (Family: 16-c)
