= Margarula =

Irish-bred Thoroughbred racehorse

- Sire: Doyoun
- Grandsire: Mill Reef
- Dam: Mild Intrigue
- Damsire: Sir Ivor
- Sex: Mare
- Foaled: 15 March 1999
- Country: Ireland
- Colour: Bay
- Breeder: Airlie Stud
- Owner: Jackie Bolger & John Corcoran; Ecurie Wildenstein
- Trainer: Jim Bolger
- Record: 14: 4-1-2

Major wins
- Irish Oaks (2002)

Margarula (foaled 15 March 1999) is an Irish Thoroughbred racehorse and broodmare. In her first eleven races she showed herself to be a tough and consistent stayer, winning three handicap races, but appeared to be some way below top class. On her twelfth start however, she produced a major upset when she defeated a field of highly regarded fillies to win the Irish Oaks at odds of 33/1. Margarula finished sixth in her two subsequent races and was retired at the end of the season. She had some success as a broodmare, producing the Sydney Cup winner Grand Marshal.

== Background ==
Margarula was a bay mare bred in Ireland by the County Kildare-based Airlie Stud. As a yearling in October 2000 the filly was consigned to the Goffs sale and was bought for IR£33,000 by the racehorse trainer and breeder Jim Bolger. During her racing career she was trained by Bolger at Coolcullen, County Carlow and owned by Jackie Bolger in partnership with John Corcoran. She was ridden in most of her races by Kevin Manning.

She was sired by Doyoun who won the 2000 Guineas and finished third in The Derby in 1988 before becoming a successful breeding stallion whose other progeny included Daylami and Kalanisi. Her dam Mild Intrigue showed modest racing ability, winning on her debut but then finishing unplaced in four subsequent starts. As a granddaughter of the American broodmare Natashka (foaled 1963), she was closely related to Questing, Elusive Quality and Dark Lomond.

== Racing career ==
=== 2001: two-year-old season ===
On her racecourse debut Margarula finished seventh in a maiden race over seven furlongs at the Curragh on 16 September. She then finished third in similar events over one mile at Gowran Park and Thurles Racecourse before running unplaced in a nursery (a handicap for two-year-olds) at Gowran Park on 13 October. On 7 November the filly made her fifth appearance in just over seven weeks when she was assigned a weight of 107 pounds for a nursery at Thurles in which she was ridden by David Moran. Starting at odds of 11/2 in a thirteen-runner field she was among the leaders from the start and kept on well to win by three quarters of a length from the favourite Arkaga who was carrying 131 pounds.

=== 2002: three-year-old season ===
Margarula began her second season by being matched against older horses and male opposition in a handicap over ten furlongs at Cork Racecourse on 31 March. Carrying 120 pounds she made steady progress in the second half of the race before taking the lead inside the final furlong and winning by a length from the five-year-old gelding Murrayfield. She finished second to Solid Approach in a handicap for three-year-olds at the Curragh on 6 May before being stepped up in distance to contest the Milltown Handicap against older horses over one and a half miles at Leopardstown Racecourse six days later. As she was assigned to carry only 106 pounds the lightweight Moran again came in to take the ride. Starting favourite against eight opponents, Margarula turned into the straight in fourth place before taking the lead a furlong out and winning by a length from the four-year-old gelding American Gothic. Five days later she started favourite for the Mourne Abbey Handicap at Cork but faded in the closing stages and finished eighth of the twelve runners.

On 6 June, Margarula was stepped up in class but dropped in distance for the Listed Victor McAlmont Stakes over nine and a half furlongs at Gowran Park and finished fifth of the fourteen runners, more than eight lengths behind the winner Fionn's Folly. Later that month she was moved into Group 2 class for the Pretty Polly Stakes. After being restrained by Manning at the rear of the field she made steady progress in the straight to finish fourth behind Tarfshi, Wrong Key and Fraulein. Despite three consecutive defeats, Margarula was then elevated to the highest class to contest the Group 1 Irish Oaks at the Curragh on 14 July and started a 33/1 outsider in a twelve-runner field. The Aidan O'Brien-trained Quarter Moon started odds-on favourite after finishing second in both the Irish 1000 Guineas and The Oaks while the other fancied runners included Irresistible Jewel (winner of the Ribblesdale Stakes), Mellow Park (Lupe Stakes, Lancashire Oaks) and Red Rioja (C L Weld Park Stakes). Margarula was settled towards the rear of the field as the O'Brien stable's pacemaker Kournakova made the running but moved up on the inside into fifth place approaching the final turn. Quarter Moon took the lead in the straight but Margarula was close behind and overtook the favourite a furlong from the finish. The two leaders drew well clear of the other fillies in the closing stages and Margarula kept on well to prevail by a length, with a gap of six lengths back to Lady's Secret in third. Jim Bolger commented "I said beforehand that I had been training for 25 years and could do with a pleasant surprise at this stage. Margarula has given it to me today after getting a peach of a ride from Kevin, who saved every inch of ground along the inner".

After her win in the Irish Oaks, Margarula made two more appearances, both against top class male opposition. In the Irish Champion takes over ten furlongs at Leopardstown on 7 September she finished sixth of the seven runners behind Grandera, who won by a short head from Hawk Wing. One week later the filly contested the Irish St Leger over fourteen furlongs at the Curragh and again finished sixth in a race which saw Vinnie Roe record the second of his four wins in the event.

== Breeding record ==
In December 2003, Margarula was put up for auction at Tattersalls and was bought for 825,000 guineas. She entered the ownership of Carwell Equities Ltd and produced at least five winners:

- Set the Scene, a bay filly, foaled in 2004, sired by Sadler's Wells. Won one race.
- Marywell, chestnut filly, 2007, by Selkirk. Won one race, dam of Martlet (Galtres Stakes).
- Rosslyn Castle, chestnut colt (later gelded), 2009, by Selkirk. Won three flat races and one National Hunt race.
- Grand Marshal, brown colt (gelded), 2010, by Dansili. Won two races in Britain as "Magog". Later exported to Australia where he won the Sydney Cup and the Moonee Valley Cup.
- Marmion, bay colt (gelded), 2012, by Cape Cross. Won two races.

== Pedigree ==
Pedigree of Margarula (IRE), bay mare, 1999
Sire Doyoun (IRE) 1985	Mill Reef (USA); 1968	Never Bend	Nasrullah
Sire Doyoun (IRE) 1985	Mill Reef (USA); 1968	Never Bend	Lalun
Sire Doyoun (IRE) 1985	Mill Reef (USA); 1968	Milan Mill	Princequillo
Sire Doyoun (IRE) 1985	Mill Reef (USA); 1968	Milan Mill	Virginia Water
Sire Doyoun (IRE) 1985	Dumka (FR); 1971	Kashmir	Tudor Melody
Sire Doyoun (IRE) 1985	Dumka (FR); 1971	Kashmir	Queen of Speed
Sire Doyoun (IRE) 1985	Dumka (FR); 1971	Faizebad	Prince Taj
Sire Doyoun (IRE) 1985	Dumka (FR); 1971	Faizebad	Floralie
Dam Mild Intrigue (USA) 1985	Sir Ivor (USA); 1965	Sir Gaylord	Turn-To
Dam Mild Intrigue (USA) 1985	Sir Ivor (USA); 1965	Sir Gaylord	Somethingroyal
Dam Mild Intrigue (USA) 1985	Sir Ivor (USA); 1965	Attica	Mr Trouble
Dam Mild Intrigue (USA) 1985	Sir Ivor (USA); 1965	Attica	Athenia
Dam Mild Intrigue (USA) 1985	Mild Deception (USA); 1970	Buckpasser	Tom Fool
Dam Mild Intrigue (USA) 1985	Mild Deception (USA); 1970	Buckpasser	Busanda
Dam Mild Intrigue (USA) 1985	Mild Deception (USA); 1970	Natashka	Dedicate
Dam Mild Intrigue (USA) 1985	Mild Deception (USA); 1970	Natashka	Natasha (Family: 13-c)
