= Zagreb (disambiguation) =

Zagreb is the capital and largest city in Croatia.

Zagreb may also refer to:

- NK Zagreb, an association football team founded in 1908
- RK Zagreb, a handball team founded in 1922
- KK Zagreb, a basketball team founded in 1970
- Yugoslav destroyer Zagreb, a Beograd-class Yugoslav ship from the 1930s
- Zagreb (horse) (1993–2013), an American-bred, Irish-trained Thoroughbred racehorse and sire
- 187700 Zagreb, an asteroid discovered in 2008
- Zagreb, one of the names of Roman Seleznev (born 1984), Russian computer hacker
