= Legacy Cup =

Flat horse race in Britain

- Location: Newbury Racecourse; Newbury, England
- Inaugurated: 1997
- Race type: Flat / Thoroughbred
- Sponsor: Dubai Duty Free
- Website: Newbury

Race information
- Distance: 1m 3f (2,213 m)
- Surface: Turf
- Track: Left-handed
- Qualification: Three-years-old and up
- Weight: 8 st 11 lb (3yo); 9 st 3 lb (4yo+); Allowances; 3 lb for fillies and mares Penalties; 7 lb for Group 1 winners * 5 lb for Group 2 winners * 3 lb for Group 3 winners * * after 31 March
- Purse: £70,000 (2022); 1st: £40,000

Legacy Cup
2022
| Stay Alert | Fancy Man | Dubai Future |

Previous years
2021
| Solid Stone | Foxes Tales | Ilaraab |

2020-2011
2020
Elarqam | Desert Encounter | Extra Elusive
2019
Desert Encounter | Pivoine | Pondus
2018
Young Rascal | Mirage Dancer | Desert Encounter
2017
Desert Encounter | Second Step | Secret Number
2016
Algometer | Dartmouth | Tashaar
2015
The Corsican | Sky Hunter | Eagle Top
2014
Hillstar | Tasaday | Cubanita
2013
Camborne | Gifted Girl | Main Sequence
2012
Black Spirit | Lay Time | Coquet
2011
Green Destiny | Al Kazeem | Sea Of Heartbreak

2010-2001
2010
Dangerous Midge | Rainbow Peak | Campanologist
2009
Doctor Fremantle | Look Here | Campanologist
2008
Blue Monday | Spanish Moon | Multidimensional
2007
Halicarnassus | Soapy Danger | Papal Bull
2006
Blue Monday | Tam Lin | Admiral's Cruise
2005
Compton Bolter | Into The Dark | Notable Guest
2004
Sights On Gold | Imperial Dancer | Compton Bolter
2003
Compton Bolter | Researched | Hilbre Island
2002
Legal Approach | Frankies Dream | Bustan
2001
Grandera | Mubtaker | Compton Bolter

2000-1997
2000
Pawn Broker | Francesco Guardi | Diamond White
1999
Fantastic Light | High-Rise | Pegnitz
1998
Scorned | Taipan | Posidonas
1997
Posidonas | Arabian Story | Swain

The Legacy Cup is a flat horse race in Great Britain open to horses aged three years or older. It is run at Newbury over a distance of 1 mile and 3 furlongs (2,213 metres), and it is scheduled to take place each year in September.

The event was established in 1997, and the inaugural running was won by Posidonas. It initially held Listed status, and was promoted to Group 3 level in 2004. It was previously known as the Arc Trial but rarely served as a trial for the Prix de l'Arc de Triomphe. The race lost its Group 3 status when it was removed from the Pattern and Listed race programme in 2023.

== Records ==
Most successful horse (2 wins):

- Compton Bolter – 2003, 2005
- Blue Monday – 2006, 2008
- Desert Encounter – 2017, 2019

Leading jockey (3 wins):

- Jim Crowley - Algometer (2016), Young Rascal (2018), Elarqam (2020)

Leading trainer (4 wins)

- David Simcock - The Corsican (2015), Algometer (2016), Desert Encounter (2017, 2019)
- Sir Michael Stoute - Fantastic Light (1999), Doctor Fremantle (2009), Hillstar (2014), Solid Stone (2021)

== Winners ==
| Year | Winner | Age | Jockey | Trainer | Time |
|---|---|---|---|---|---|
| 1997 | Posidonas | 5 | Richard Quinn | Paul Cole | 2:18.97 |
| 1998 | Scorned | 3 | Simon Whitworth | Ian Balding | 2:18.38 |
| 1999 | Fantastic Light | 3 | Kieren Fallon | Sir Michael Stoute | 2:21.51 |
| 2000 | Pawn Broker | 3 | Michael Kinane | David Elsworth | 2:18.69 |
| 2001 | Grandera | 3 | Michael Hills | James Fanshawe | 2:16.54 |
| 2002 | Legal Approach | 3 | Keith Dalgleish | Mark Johnston | 2:18.18 |
| 2003 | Compton Bolter | 6 | Eddie Ahern | Gerard Butler | 2:17.05 |
| 2004 | Sights on Gold | 5 | Frankie Dettori | Saeed bin Suroor | 2:18.07 |
| 2005 | Compton Bolter | 8 | Darryll Holland | Gerard Butler | 2:19.05 |
| 2006 | Blue Monday | 5 | Steve Drowne | Roger Charlton | 2:17.66 |
| 2007 | Halicarnassus | 3 | Tadhg O'Shea | Mick Channon | 2:18.11 |
| 2008 | Blue Monday | 7 | Steve Drowne | Roger Charlton | 2:20.62 |
| 2009 | Doctor Fremantle | 4 | Ryan Moore | Sir Michael Stoute | 2:19.97 |
| 2010 | Dangerous Midge | 4 | Martin Dwyer | Brian Meehan | 2:19.45 |
| 2011 | Green Destiny | 4 | Kieren Fallon | William Haggas | 2:21.83 |
| 2012 | Black Spirit | 5 | Adam Kirby | Clive Cox | 2:21.85 |
| 2013 | Camborne | 5 | Robert Havlin | John Gosden | 2:20.19 |
| 2014 | Hillstar | 4 | Ryan Moore | Sir Michael Stoute | 2:30.83 |
| 2015 | The Corsican | 4 | Jamie Spencer | David Simcock | 2:27.27 |
| 2016 | Algometer | 3 | Jim Crowley | David Simcock | 2:22.86 |
| 2017 | Desert Encounter | 5 | Sean Levey | David Simcock | 2:17.91 |
| 2018 | Young Rascal | 3 | Jim Crowley | William Haggas | 2:25.98 |
| 2019 | Desert Encounter | 7 | Jamie Spencer | David Simcock | 2:18.34 |
| 2020 | Elarqam | 5 | Jim Crowley | Mark Johnston | 2:20.65 |
| 2021 | Solid Stone | 5 | William Buick | Sir Michael Stoute | 2:23.12 |
| 2022 | Stay Alert | 3 | David Egan | Hughie Morrison | 2:17.71 |

== See also ==
- Horse racing in Great Britain
- List of British flat horse races
