= Doyoun =

British-bred Thoroughbred racehorse

- Racing colours of the Aga Khan
- Sire: Mill Reef
- Grandsire: Never Bend
- Dam: Dumka
- Damsire: Kashmir
- Sex: Stallion
- Foaled: 8 March 1985
- Country: United Kingdom
- Colour: Brown
- Breeder: Aga Khan IV
- Owner: Aga Khan IV
- Trainer: Michael Stoute
- Record: 7:3-0-3

Major wins
- Craven Stakes (1988); 2000 Guineas (1988)

Awards
- Timeform rating

Doyoun (8 March 1985 – 5 December 2002) was a British Thoroughbred racehorse and sire, best known for winning the classic 2000 Guineas in 1988. In a racing career which lasted from October 1987 until October 1988 he ran seven times and won three races. After winning his only race as a two-year-old in 1987, Doyoun produced his most impressive performance on his three-year-old debut when he defeated Warning in the Craven Stakes. He won the 2000 Guineas on his next appearance but failed to win again, although he did finish third in The Derby. He was retired to stud at the end of the season, and after a slow start to his breeding career, sired several important winners including Daylami and Kalanisi. He died in Turkey in 2002.

== Background ==
Doyoun was a "handsome" dark-coated bay horse bred by his owner the Aga Khan. His dam Dumka won the Poule d'Essai des Pouliches for the Aga Knah in 1974 and went on to become a highly successful broodmare. Her other winners included Dalsaan (Hungerford Stakes), Dolpour (Gordon Richards Stakes) and Dafayna (Cork and Orrery Stakes). He was one of many major winners sired by the American-bred Epsom Derby winner Mill Reef who was the Leading sire in Great Britain and Ireland in 1978 and 1987.

Doyoun was sent into training with Michael Stoute, who had trained the Aga Khan's Derby winners Shergar and Shahrastani, at his Beech Hurst Stables in Newmarket, Suffolk. He was ridden in all his races by the Irish jockey Walter Swinburn.

== Racing career ==
=== 1987:two-year-old season ===
On his only appearance as a two-year-old in 1987 Doyoun won the Westley Maiden Stakes over seven furlongs at Newmarket Racecourse in autumn. Despite its modest status and prize money, the Westley has been won by many horses who went on to major success including Shadeed and Barathea.

=== 1988:three-year-old season ===
On his three-year-old debut, Doyoun appeared at Newmarket in April for the Craven Stakes, a trial race for the 2000 Guineas in which he was matched against Warning, the previous season's top-rated two-year-old. Starting the 100/30 second favourite, Doyoun took the lead two furlongs from the finish and drew clear in the closing stages to win by four lengths from the previously undefeated Warning. Two weeks after his win in the Craven, Doyoun faced eight opponents in the 2000 Guineas over the same course and distance. With Warning and several other leading contenders having been withdrawn, the field for the race was considered to be lacking in quality and Doyoun was made the 4/5 favourite. Swinburn tracked the leaders before sending the colt into the lead two furlongs out, but on this occasion he was unable to break clear of the field and was "all out" to hold off the challenge of Charmer by half a length.

On 1 June, Doyoun was stepped up in distance to contest the Derby over one and a half miles at Epsom. He was the 9/1 fourth choice in the betting, behind Red Glow, Unfuwain and Minster Son, just ahead of the Aga Khan's other runner Kahyasi. Doyoun turned into the straight in fifth place, but although he made some progress he was unable to reach the lead and finished third behind Kahyasi and Glacial Storm, beaten a total of three lengths. Racing on softer ground in the King George VI and Queen Elizabeth Stakes at Ascot in July, Doyoun weakened in the closing stages and finished sixth of the ten runners behind Mtoto. The colt reverted to a mile in August and finished third behind the four-year-old Prince Rupert in the Waterford Crystal Mile at Goodwood. On his final appearance, Doyoun ran over ten furlongs in the Champion Stakes at Newmarket in October, and finished third to the filly Indian Skimmer, beaten seven lengths.

== Assessment ==
In their book A Century of Champions, based on a modified version of the Timeform system, John Randall and Tony Morris rated Doyoun a "poor" winner of the 2000 Guineas.

While admitting that he was not the best of classic winners, Michael Stoute called Doyoun "very honest and a joy to train", whilst Walter Swinburn described him as "a really tough, gutsy racehorse".

== Stud record ==
Doyoun stood as a stallion at the Aga Khan's Ballymany and Gilltown Stud in Ireland until 1998 when he was sold and exported to Turkey. His reputation as a sire of winners grew following his departure as his sons Daylami and Kalanisi won the Breeders' Cup Turf in 1999 and 2000 respectively. Despite being trained in Europe, both horses were voted American Champion Male Turf Horse at the Eclipse Awards. Following his success, attempts were made to buy the horse back, but his owners, the Turkish Jockey Club, refused to sell. His other progeny included Manntari, Margarula and the Manhattan Handicap winner Manndar. Doyoun died of intestinal cancer at the Izmit Central Covering Station near Istanbul on 5 December 2002.

== Pedigree ==
Pedigree of Doyoun (GB), bay stallion, 1985
Sire Mill Reef (USA) 1968	Never Bend (USA); 1960	Nasrullah	Nearco
Sire Mill Reef (USA) 1968	Never Bend (USA); 1960	Nasrullah	Mumtaz Begum
Sire Mill Reef (USA) 1968	Never Bend (USA); 1960	Lalun	Djeddah
Sire Mill Reef (USA) 1968	Never Bend (USA); 1960	Lalun	Be Faithful
Sire Mill Reef (USA) 1968	Milan Mill (USA); 1962	Princequillo	Prince Rose
Sire Mill Reef (USA) 1968	Milan Mill (USA); 1962	Princequillo	Cosquilla
Sire Mill Reef (USA) 1968	Milan Mill (USA); 1962	Virginia Water	Count Fleet
Sire Mill Reef (USA) 1968	Milan Mill (USA); 1962	Virginia Water	Red Ray
Dam Dumka (FR) 1971	Kashmir (IRE); 1963	Tudor Melody	Tudor Minstrel
Dam Dumka (FR) 1971	Kashmir (IRE); 1963	Tudor Melody	Matelda
Dam Dumka (FR) 1971	Kashmir (IRE); 1963	Queen of Speed	Blue Train
Dam Dumka (FR) 1971	Kashmir (IRE); 1963	Queen of Speed	Bishopscourt
Dam Dumka (FR) 1971	Faizebad (FR); 1962	Prince Taj	Prince Bio
Dam Dumka (FR) 1971	Faizebad (FR); 1962	Prince Taj	Malindi
Dam Dumka (FR) 1971	Faizebad (FR); 1962	Floralie	Pot o' Luck
Dam Dumka (FR) 1971	Faizebad (FR); 1962	Floralie	Divel (Family 21-a)
