= Pan American Stakes =

- Class: Grade III
- Location: Gulfstream Park; Hallandale Beach, Florida, United States
- Inaugurated: 1962 (as Pan American Handicap)
- Race type: Thoroughbred – Flat racing
- Sponsor: Rood and Riddle (since 2021)
- Website: Gulfstream Park

Race information
- Distance: 1 1/2 miles
- Surface: Turf
- Track: Left-handed
- Qualification: Four-year-old and older
- Weight: 124 lbs with allowances
- Purse: $200,000 (since 2020)

The Pan American Stakes is a Grade II American Thoroughbred horse race for horses that are four years or older held over a distance of one and one-half miles (twelve furlongs) on the turf usually scheduled annually in late March as an under card event on Florida Derby day at Gulfstream Park, Hallandale Beach, Florida. The event currently carries a purse of $200,000.

== History ==
The inaugural running of the event was on Pan American Day, 14 April 1962, as the Pan American Handicap over one and one-eighth miles distance on the dirt and was easily won by Brae Burn Farm's talented six year old mare Shirley Jones who was ridden by Larry Gilligan defeating nine other starters in a time of 1:51 1/5 by five lengths.

The event was inspired to be an attraction for horses from both North and South America and this seemed to be a success as in the first eleven runnings of the event four winners were bred in Argentina and one in Chile. Until 1971 the event was held on the last day of the Gulfstream Park Meeting which would be in mid-April and thus the event would be scheduled close to the Pan American Day festivities.

In 1965 the event's distance was modified to its present one and a half mile on the turf with the purse doubled to $50,000 added.

In 1973 the first year the classification system was enacted, the event was set with Grade II status with the Canadian bred Lord Vancouver victorious by 2 1/2 lengths.

In the 1970s the event started to attract European bred long distance runners. In 1977 the French bred Gravelines set a new track record for the distance at Gulfstream Park. In 1979 the British bred Noble Dancer continued his outstanding long distance form carrying 129 pounds as the topweight after winning the G1 United Nations Handicap the previous year. The Irish bred filly Little Bonny managed an upset victory as a 20-1 longshot in 1981 although having fine form from Europe finishing second in the G1 Irish Oaks and second in the G1 Prix Vermeille (French Oaks).

In 1983 the event was upgraded to Grade I and that year the event was run split divisions, the only time that the race was split.

In 1990 the event was downgraded to a Grade II race and once more to Grade III in 2006.

In 2009 the event's conditions were changed from handicap to stakes allowance with name of race changed to the Pan American Stakes.

The event was reclassified as Grade II in 2012 and with the exception of the 2015 when it was downgraded to Grade III.

Due to inclement wet weather the event has been moved off the turf track three times. The 1975 running was shifted to the dirt track and was run at a mile and a half distance on the main track. In 1989 and 2009 the event was run at the shorter 1 1/4 miles distance when it was moved off the turf.

In 2013, Twilight Eclipse set a world record for 1 1/2 miles by winning the Pan American in a final time of 2:22.63. This time lowered the world record mark set just one week earlier at Santa Anita Park by Bright Thought in the San Luis Rey Handicap.

In 2025 the event was downgraded by the Thoroughbred Owners and Breeders Association to Grade III status.

== Records ==
Time record:

- 1 1/2 miles – 2:22.63 – Twilight Eclipse (2013)

Margins:

- 11 lengths – Mi Selecto (1989)

Most wins:

- 2 – Fraise (1993, 1994)
- 2 – Buck's Boy (1998, 2000)
- 2 – Quest Star (2003, 2004)
- 2 – Newsdad (2012, 2014)
- 2 – Far Bridge (2025, 2026)

Most wins by a trainer:

- 6 – William I. Mott (1991, 1993, 1994, 2006, 2012, 2014)

Most wins by a jockey:

- 4 - Joel Rosario (2014, 2022, 2024, 2025)

Most wins by an owner:

- 2 - Bertram R. Firestone (1974, 1991)
- 2 - Madeleine A. Paulson (1993, 1994)
- 2 – Quarter B Farm (1998, 2000)
- 2 - Mansell Stables (2003, 2004)
- 2 - James S. Karp (2012, 2014)
- 2 - Michael Dubb (2023, 2024)
- 2 - LSU Stables (2025,2026)

== Winners ==
Year	Winner	Age	Jockey	Trainer	Owner	Distance	Time	Purse	Grade	Ref
Pan American Stakes
2026	Far Bridge	6	Flavien Prat	Miguel Clement	LSU Stables	1 1/2 miles	2:23.51	$202,500	III	
2025	Far Bridge	5	Joel Rosario	Christophe Clement	LSU Stables	1 1/2 miles	2:23.19	$200,000	III	
2024	Kertez (GB)	6	Joel Rosario	Christophe Clement	Michael Dubb, Morris Bailey & West Point Thoroughbreds	1 1/2 miles	2:24.93	$200,000	II	
2023	Therapist	8	Irad Ortiz Jr.	Michael J. Maker	Michael Dubb	1 1/2 miles	2:29.22	$200,000	II	
2022	Gufo	5	Joel Rosario	Christophe Clement	Otter Bend Stables	abt. 1 1/2 miles	2:27.28	$200,000	II	
2021	Churn N Burn	4	Julien R. Leparoux	Ian Wilkes	Lothenbach Stables	1 1/2 miles	2:23.63	$200,000	II	
2020	Bemma's Boy	5	Florent Geroux	Michael J. Maker	Paradise Farms	1 1/2 miles	2:24.91	$200,000	II	
2019	Focus Group	5	Irad Ortiz Jr.	Chad C. Brown	Klaravich Stables & William H. Lawrence	1 1/2 miles	2:30.03	$250,000	II	
2018	Hi Happy (ARG)	6	Luis Saez	Todd A. Pletcher	La Providencia	1 1/2 miles	2:23.85	$250,000	II	
2017	Sadler's Joy	4	Julien R. Leparoux	Thomas Albertrani	Woodslane Farm	1 1/2 miles	2:26.89	$200,000	II	
2016	Kaigun	6	Joe Bravo	Mark E. Casse	Quintessential Racing, Horse'n Around Racing Stable & Gary Barber	1 1/2 miles	2:29.20	$200,000	II	
2015	Imagining	7	Irad Ortiz Jr.	Claude R. McGaughey III	Phipps Stable	1 1/2 miles	2:26.32	$150,000	III	
2014	Newsdad	6	Joel Rosario	William I. Mott	James S. Karp	1 1/2 miles	2:22.77	$200,000	II	
2013	Twilight Eclipse	4	Javier Castellano	Thomas Albertrani	West Point Thoroughbreds	1 1/2 miles	2:22.63	$150,000	II	
2012	Newsdad	4	Julien R. Leparoux	William I. Mott	James S. Karp	1 1/2 miles	2:24.93	$142,500	II	
2011	Rahy's Attorney	7	Emma-Jayne Wilson	Ian Black	Ellie Boje Farm, Mitch Peters, Dean Read & Jim MacLellan	1 1/2 miles	2:25.85	$150,000	III	
2010	Bearpath	4	Frederic Lenclud	Ian R. Wilkes	Lothenbach Stables	1 1/2 miles	2:32.60	$150,000	III	
2009	Buddy's Humor	5	Jose Lezcano	Bruce N. Levine	Eli Lomita	1 1/4 miles	2:02.64	$147,000	III	Off turf
Pan American Handicap
2008	Presious Passion	5	Ariel Smith	Mary Hartmann	Patricia A. Generazio	1 1/2 miles	2:26.15	$150,000	III	
2007	Jambalaya	5	Javier Castellano	Catherine Day Phillips	Kingfield Racing Stable	1 1/2 miles	2:24.98	$150,000	III	
2006	Silver Whistle	4	Edgar S. Prado	William I. Mott	Stronach Stables	1 1/2 miles	2:24.35	$150,000	III	
2005	Navesink River	4	John R. Velazquez	Todd A. Pletcher	Char-Mari Stable	1 1/2 miles	2:25.95	$150,000	II	
2004	Quest Star	5	Pat Day	W. Elliott Walden	Mansell Stables	1 1/2 miles	2:26.46	$200,000	II	
2003	Quest Star	4	Edgar S. Prado	W. Elliott Walden	Mansell Stables	abt. 1 1/2 miles	2:28.45	$200,000	II	
2002	Deeliteful Irving	4	Christopher P. DeCarlo	Todd A. Pletcher	Anstu Stable	1 1/2 miles	2:24.14	$200,000	II	
2001	Whata Brainstorm	4	John R. Velazquez	James E. Picou	John Eaton & Steve Laymon	1 1/2 miles	2:23.75	$250,000	II	
2000	Buck's Boy	7	Edgar S. Prado	P. Noel Hickey	Quarter B Farm	1 1/2 miles	2:24.80	$250,000	II	
1999	Unite's Big Red	5	Mike E. Smith	Randy Mills	Break Away Racing Stable	1 1/2 miles	2:23.15	$250,000	II	
1998	Buck's Boy	5	Earlie Fires	P. Noel Hickey	Quarter B Farm	1 1/2 miles	2:23.43	$250,000	II	
1997	Flag Down	7	Jose A. Santos	Christophe Clement	Allen E. Paulson	1 1/2 miles	2:27.08	$300,000	II	
1996	Celtic Arms (FR)	5	Mike E. Smith	Ben D. A. Cecil	Gary A. Tanaka	1 1/2 miles	2:25.71	$300,000	II	
1995	Awad	5	Eddie Maple	David G. Donk	Ryehill Farm	1 1/2 miles	2:29.44	$300,000	II	
1994	Fraise	6	Mike E. Smith	William I. Mott	Madeleine A. Paulson	1 1/2 miles	2:24.65	$300,000	II	
1993	Fraise	5	Pat Valenzuela	William I. Mott	Madeleine A. Paulson	abt. 1 1/2 miles	2:32.86	$300,000	II	
1992	Wall Street Dancer	4	Jorge Velasquez	Niall M. O'Callaghan	John D. Gunther	1 1/2 miles	2:25.53	$350,000	II	
1991	Phantom Breeze (IRE)	5	Julie Krone	William I. Mott	Bertram R. Firestone	1 1/2 miles	2:29.55	$300,000	II	
1990	My Big Boy	7	Heberto Castillo Jr.	Claude R. McGaughey III	Heidi Doubleday	1 1/2 miles	2:29.20	$300,000	II	
1989	Mi Selecto	4	Jose A. Santos	Eduardo Azpurua Sr.	Wilfredo Agusti Jr.	1 1/4 miles	2:01.60	$300,000	I	Off turf
1988	ƒ Carotene (CAN)	5	Don James Seymour	Roger L. Attfield	Kinghaven Farms	1 1/2 miles	2:25.00	$300,000	I	
1987	Iroko (GB)	5	Earlie Fires	Thomas J. Skiffington	Fernwood Stables	1 1/2 miles	2:26.40	$250,000	I	
1986	ƒ Powder Break	5	Santiago B. Soto	Luis Olivares	Robert I. Green	1 1/2 miles	2:25.00	$300,000	I	
1985	Selous Scout (CAN)	4	Robin Platts	Roger L. Attfield	Double Eagle Stable	1 1/2 miles	2:25.20	$304,500	I	
1984	Tonzarun	6	Herb McCauley	John R. Thomas	Don Everett	1 1/2 miles	2:26.80	$178,975	I	
1983	Highland Blade	5	Jacinto Vasquez	David A. Whiteley	Pen-Y-Bryn Farm	1 1/2 miles	2:29.20	$133,825	I	Division 1
1983	Field Cat	6	Jean-Luc Samyn	William E. Burch	Cornelius Vanderbilt Whitney	1 1/2 miles	2:29.60	$136,825	I	Division 2
1982	Robsphere	5	Jorge Velasquez	Richard R. Root	Harry T. Mangurian Jr.	1 1/2 miles	2:26.00	$170,250	II	
1981	ƒ Little Bonny (IRE)	4	Eddie Maple	J. Bert Sonnier	Owen Helman	1 1/2 miles	2:32.40	$186,200	II	
1980	ƒ Flitalong	4	Ramon I. Encinas	Angel Penna Sr.	Ogden Mills Phipps	1 1/2 miles	2:28.40	$150,000	II	
1979	Noble Dancer II (GB)	7	Jacinto Vasquez	Thomas J. Kelly	Haakon Fretheim	1 1/2 miles	2:25.20	$150,000	II	
1978	Bowl Game	4	Jorge Velasquez	John M. Gaver Jr.	Greentree Stable	1 1/2 miles	2:30.20	$150,000	II	
1977	Gravelines (FR)	5	Jerry D. Bailey	Neal J. Winick	Mrs. Maribel G. Blum & Mrs. Robert Harpinau	1 1/2 miles	2:24.80	$134,200	II	
1976	Improviser	4	Jean Cruguet	John J. Weipert	Elmendorf Farm	1 1/2 miles	2:26.60	$144,800	II	
1975	Buffalo Lark	5	Larry Snyder	Joseph M. Bollero	Rogers Red Top	1 1/2 miles	2:27.60	$140,200	II	Off turf
1974	London Company	4	Angel Cordero Jr.	LeRoy Jolley	Bertram R. Firestone	1 1/2 miles	2:26.40	$141,200	II	
1973	Lord Vancouver (CAN)	5	Walter Blum	Frank H. Merrill Jr.	W. Preston Gilbride	1 1/2 miles	2:26.60	$139,200	II	
1972	Unanime (ARG)	5	Heliodoro Gustines	Harry Trotsek	Hasty House Farm	1 1/2 miles	2:26.60	$140,600		
1971	Chompion	6	Michael Hole	Joe Kulina	Colonial Farm	1 1/2 miles	2:25.60	$106,100		
1970	One for All	4	Craig Perret	Horatio Luro	John A. Bell III	1 1/2 miles	2:26.80	$97,600		
1969	Hibernian (GB)	4	Pete Anderson	Woody Stephens	James Cox Brady Jr.	1 1/2 miles	2:28.40	$62,600		
1968	Irish Rebellion	4	Angel Cordero Jr.	Conn McCreary	Mac-Con Farm	1 1/2 miles	2:26.40	$67,700		Dead heat
1968	‡ Estreno II (ARG)	7	David Hidalgo	David Sazer	Robert Ballis	1 1/2 miles	2:26.40	$67,700		Dead heat
1967	War Censor	4	Earlie Fires	S. Bryant Ott	Fourth Estate Stable	1 1/2 miles	2:26.00	$66,500		
1966	Pillanlelbun (CHI)	5	Fernando Toro	Roger N. Guerini	Walnut Hill Farm	1 1/2 miles	2:26.40	$60,600		
1965	Cool Prince	5	Bill Hartack	William A. Larue	William G. Helis Jr.	1 1/2 miles	2:26.40	$65,200		
1964	† Babington (ARG)	5	Ray Broussard	Arnold N. Winick	John M. Olin	1 1/8 miles	1:51.60	$25,000		
1963	Sensitivo (ARG)	6	Howard Grant	Arnold N. Winick	Mr. & Mrs. Ralph F. Bensinger	1 1/8 miles	1:50.00	$20,000		
1962	ƒ§ Shirley Jones	6	Larry Gilligan	James W. Smith	Brae Burn Farm	1 1/8 miles	1:51.20	$20,000		

Legend:
Turf Dirt

Notes:
§ Ran as an entry
ƒ Filly or Mare
† In the 1964 running of the event Doctor Hank K. was first past the post but was disqualified to seventh after stewards ruled that he caused interference in the running. Babington (ARG) was declared the winner.
‡ Estrano II (ARG) was a field entry with Templatio II (CHI) and Mohamed (CHI)

== See also ==
List of American and Canadian Graded races
