= Royal Anthem (horse) =

American-bred, British-trained Thoroughbred racehorse

- Sire: Theatrical
- Grandsire: Nureyev
- Dam: In Neon
- Damsire: Ack Ack
- Sex: Stallion
- Foaled: 2 April 1995
- Died: 2018 (aged 22–23)
- Country: United States
- Colour: Bay
- Breeder: John A. Franks
- Owner: The Thoroughbred Corp.
- Trainer: Henry Cecil; William I. Mott (from November, 1999)
- Record: 12: 6-3-1
- Earnings: $1,876,876

Major wins
- Fairway Stakes (1998); King Edward VII Stakes (1998); Canadian International Stakes (1998); International Stakes (1999); Gulfstream Park Breeders' Cup Handicap (2000)

Awards
- Timeform rating: 135
- Last updated on 7 December 2006

Royal Anthem (April 2, 1995 – 2018) was an American-bred and primarily British-trained Thoroughbred racehorse and sire. He won top-class races on both sides of the Atlantic.

== Background ==
Royal Anthem is a dark-coated bay horse with a small white star bred by John A. Franks. He was sired by Breeders' Cup Turf winner Theatrical.

Purchased by The Thoroughbred Corp., he first raced from a base in England, where he was trained by Henry Cecil and ridden by jockey Kieren Fallon.

== Racing career ==
=== 1998: three-year-old season ===
Royal Anthem began racing at age three. He won the first two races he entered and went on to capture the 1998 King Edward VII Stakes at Ascot Racecourse. He was then moved up to Group One class to contest Britain's most prestigious all-aged race, the King George VI and Queen Elizabeth Stakes. He started at odds of 7/2 and finished third behind Swain and High-Rise.

After a break of almost three months, Royal Anthem was sent to Canada for the Canadian International Stakes at Woodbine Racetrack. Ridden by American jockey Gary Stevens, the colt beat defending champion and future Canadian Horse Racing Hall of Fame inductee Chief Bearhart by two lengths.

Royal Anthem was then sent to Churchill Downs in Kentucky to compete in the 1998 Breeders' Cup Turf. Six days before the race his trainer revealed that Royal Anthem was "hopping lame." Over the next few days, the horse appeared to recover but finished seventh of the fourteen runners behind Buck's Boy.

=== 1999: four-year-old season ===
At age four in 1999, Royal Anthem finished second in the June 4 Coronation Cup to Daylami, a five-year-old who was his nemesis for the rest of the year. He finished second again in the Hardwicke Stakes, after which his handlers brought American jockey Gary Stevens to ride him in the Juddmonte International Stakes. Following an eight-length win, Royal Anthem was hailed by some in the United Kingdom as 'the best in the world'. However, in his next outing, he finished fifth to winner Daylami in the Irish Champion Stakes and second to Daylami again in the 1999 Breeders' Cup Turf at Gulfstream Park in Florida.

=== 2000: five-year-old season ===
After the Breeders' Cup race, his owner sent Royal Anthem to the Payson Park thoroughbred training facility near Indiantown, Florida, where his conditioning was taken over by U.S. Hall of Fame trainer Bill Mott, who had trained Royal Anthem's sire, Theatrical. In February 2000, the horse made his first start for Mott with a win in the Gulfstream Park Breeders' Cup Handicap under jockey Jerry Bailey. He was scheduled to compete in the March 25 Dubai Sheema Classic at Nad Al Sheba Racecourse, but a swollen tendon in his left foreleg prevented him from competing and ended his racing career.

== Stud career ==
Royal Anthem was retired to stand at stud at Hopewell Farm in Midway, Kentucky. He stood at stud at in Kilkenny, Ireland, as a successful dual purpose sire. He moved to Beech Tree Stud in 2016. The best of his progeny is probably multiple Grade I winner Presious Passion. Royal Anthem is the damsire of Belmont Stakes winner Palace Malice and Spring Tennō Shō winner Justin Palace.

He died of the influence of lymphangitis in his back leg in 2018.

== Pedigree ==
Pedigree of Royal Anthem (USA), bay stallion, 1995
Sire Theatrical (IRE) 1982	Nureyev (USA); 1977	Northern Dancer	Nearctic
Sire Theatrical (IRE) 1982	Nureyev (USA); 1977	Northern Dancer	Natalma
Sire Theatrical (IRE) 1982	Nureyev (USA); 1977	Special	Forli
Sire Theatrical (IRE) 1982	Nureyev (USA); 1977	Special	Thong
Sire Theatrical (IRE) 1982	Tree of Knowledge (IRE); 1977	Sassafras	Sheshoon
Sire Theatrical (IRE) 1982	Tree of Knowledge (IRE); 1977	Sassafras	Ruta
Sire Theatrical (IRE) 1982	Tree of Knowledge (IRE); 1977	Sensibility	Hail To Reason
Sire Theatrical (IRE) 1982	Tree of Knowledge (IRE); 1977	Sensibility	Pange
Dam In Neon (USA) 1982	Ack Ack (USA); 1966	Battle Joined	Armageddon
Dam In Neon (USA) 1982	Ack Ack (USA); 1966	Battle Joined	Ethel Walker
Dam In Neon (USA) 1982	Ack Ack (USA); 1966	Fast Turn	Turn-To
Dam In Neon (USA) 1982	Ack Ack (USA); 1966	Fast Turn	Cherokee Rose
Dam In Neon (USA) 1982	Shamara (USA); 1973	Dewan	Bold Ruler
Dam In Neon (USA) 1982	Shamara (USA); 1973	Dewan	Sunshine Nell
Dam In Neon (USA) 1982	Shamara (USA); 1973	Palsy Walsy	Sea o Erin
Dam In Neon (USA) 1982	Shamara (USA); 1973	Palsy Walsy	Allie's Pal (Family: 8-k)
