= Brian Meehan (racehorse trainer) =

Irish-born racehorse trainer

Personal information
- Born: 16 July 1967 (age 59) Limerick, Ireland
- Occupation: Trainer

Horse racing career
- Sport: Horse racing

Racing awards
- International Trainer of the Year 2006

Significant horses
- Dangerous Midge, David Junior, Most Improved, Red Rocks

Brian Joseph Meehan (born 16 July 1967 in Limerick, Ireland) is a Thoroughbred Racehorse Trainer who began his career as a licensed trainer in 1992. Since 2006 he has been based at the historic Manton Estate on the Marlborough Downs near Manton, Wiltshire, England, which he purchased in October 2017.

== Major wins ==
United Kingdom

- Cheveley Park Stakes - (2) Magical Romance (2004), Donna Blini (2005)
- Champion Stakes - (1) David Junior (2005)
- Eclipse Stakes - (1) David Junior (2006)
- Racing Post Trophy - (1) Crowded House (2008)
- St. James's Palace Stakes - (1) Most Improved (2012)

United Arab Emirates

- Dubai Duty Free Stakes - (1) David Junior (2006)

France

- Prix de la Forêt - (1) Tomba (1998)
- Prix Morny - (2) Bad As I Wanna Be (2000), Arcano (2009)

Germany

- Bayerisches Zuchtrennen - (1) Kaieteur (2002)

United States

- Gazelle Stakes - (1) Buy the Sport (2003)
- Breeders' Cup Turf - (2) Red Rocks (2006), Dangerous Midge (2010)
- Man o' War Stakes - (1) Red Rocks (2007)
