= Theatrical (horse) =

Irish-bred Thoroughbred racehorse

- Sire: Nureyev
- Grandsire: Northern Dancer
- Dam: Tree Of Knowledge
- Damsire: Sassafras
- Sex: Stallion
- Foaled: 13 March 1982
- Country: Ireland
- Colour: Bay
- Breeder: Bertram & Diana Firestone
- Owner: Allen E. Paulson
- Trainer: Dermot Weld, Ireland William I. Mott, USA
- Record: 22: 10-4-2
- Earnings: $2,943,627

Major wins
- Ballysax Stakes (1985); Derrinstown Stud Derby Trial (1985); Hialeah Turf Cup Handicap (1987); Man o' War Stakes (1987); Turf Classic Invitational Stakes (1987); Red Smith Handicap (1987); Bowling Green Handicap (1987); Sword Dancer Handicap (1987); Turf Classic Stakes (1987) Breeders' Cup wins: Breeders' Cup Turf (1987)

Awards
- Champion Older Horse in Ireland (1987); American Champion Male Turf Horse (1987)

Theatrical (13 March 1982 – 31 August 2012) was an Irish-bred Thoroughbred racehorse who won the 1987 Breeders' Cup Turf and was a successful sire.

== Background ==
Theatrical was a tall bay horse with a narrow white blaze, and white socks on his hind legs bred by Bertram & Diana Firestone at their Gilltown Stud in Kilcullen, County Kildare, Ireland. He was sired by Nureyev the disqualified "winner" of the 1980 2000 Guineas. His dam was the Irish mare Tree Of Knowledge.

== Racing career ==
Theatrical trained by Hall of Fame trainer Dermot Weld won his only race as a two-year-old, a maiden race over eight and a half furlongs at Gowran Park in October. Timeform commented "will stay 1¼ miles; sure to go on to much better things." Racing at age three on the turf, under jockey Michael Kinane he won the Ballysax Stakes and the Derrinstown Stud Derby Trial. In The Derby he was ridden by Lester Piggott and finished seventh behind Slip Anchor. He was re-united with Kinane for the Irish Sweeps Derby in which he finished second to Law Society, but then ran unplaced behind Commanche Run in the Irish Champion Stakes. Late in the year, he was sent to the United States to compete in the Breeders' Cup Turf at Aqueduct Racetrack in New York City, where he finished eleventh. Theatrical returned to race in the 1986 Turf, where the heavily favored Dancing Brave finished fourth. Theatrical was beaten by a neck in finishing second to Manila.

In 1987, Theatrical was brought to the United States and conditioned by new trainer Bill Mott. Under the future Hall of Fame trainer, the colt won the Hialeah Turf Cup Handicap and the Turf Classic Invitational Stakes. He also defeated Prix de l'Arc de Triomphe winner Trempolino to win the Breeders' Cup Turf and claim the Eclipse Award for American Champion Male Turf Horse.

== Stud record ==
In 1988 Theatrical stood at stud at Hill 'n' Dale Farms near Lexington, Kentucky. He was pensioned October 13, 2009, due to the infirmities of old age coupled with declining fertility. He has sired 18 Grade I stakes race winners, and his progeny have earned more than $65 million in purse money. Among his progeny, Theatrical sired Media Puzzle, the 2002 Melbourne Cup winner, Zagreb (Irish Derby), Royal Anthem, whose wins include the Canadian International Stakes (1998) and the International Stakes (1999), and Hishi Amazon, who won the Hanshin Sansai Himba Stakes and Queen Elizabeth II Commemorative Cup. Theatrical was also the damsire of Rail Link, winner of the 2006 Prix de l'Arc de Triomphe, and Sir Mowgli XVII, four-time winning thoroughbred sired by Thunder Gulch. Sir Mowgli XVII is now a leading Hunter competing throughout the Southwest, having recently relocated to Durango Farms in Coto de Caza, CA. Theatrical was retired from stud in 2009 and lived the remainder of his life as a pensioner at Hill 'n' Dale Farms in Lexington, Kentucky. He was euthanized on August 31, 2012 at age 30 due to "the infirmities of old age."

== Pedigree ==
Pedigree of Theatrical (IRE), bay stallion, 1982
Sire Nureyev (USA) 1977	Northern Dancer (CAN); 1961	Nearctic	Nearco
Sire Nureyev (USA) 1977	Northern Dancer (CAN); 1961	Nearctic	Lady Angela
Sire Nureyev (USA) 1977	Northern Dancer (CAN); 1961	Natalma	Native Dancer
Sire Nureyev (USA) 1977	Northern Dancer (CAN); 1961	Natalma	Almahmoud
Sire Nureyev (USA) 1977	Special (USA); 1969	Forli	Aristophanes
Sire Nureyev (USA) 1977	Special (USA); 1969	Forli	Trevisa
Sire Nureyev (USA) 1977	Special (USA); 1969	Thong	Nantallah
Sire Nureyev (USA) 1977	Special (USA); 1969	Thong	Rough Shod
Dam Tree of Knowledge (IRE) 1977	Sassafras (FR); 1967	Sheshoon	Precipitation
Dam Tree of Knowledge (IRE) 1977	Sassafras (FR); 1967	Sheshoon	Noorani
Dam Tree of Knowledge (IRE) 1977	Sassafras (FR); 1967	Ruta	Ratification
Dam Tree of Knowledge (IRE) 1977	Sassafras (FR); 1967	Ruta	Dame d'Atour
Dam Tree of Knowledge (IRE) 1977	Sensibility (USA); 1971	Hail To Reason	Turn-To
Dam Tree of Knowledge (IRE) 1977	Sensibility (USA); 1971	Hail To Reason	Nothirdchance
Dam Tree of Knowledge (IRE) 1977	Sensibility (USA); 1971	Pange	King's Bench
Dam Tree of Knowledge (IRE) 1977	Sensibility (USA); 1971	Pange	York Gala (Family: 3-h)
