= Charles J. Cella =

- Born: August 27, 1936; St. Louis, Missouri, U.S.
- Died: December 6, 2017 (aged 81); St. Louis, Missouri, U.S.
- Occupations: Businessman: Thoroughbred Racing Executive; Racehorse owner
- Children: 3
- Parent: John G. Cella

Charles Joshua Cella (August 27, 1936 – December 6, 2017) was president of Southern Real Estate and Financial Company, an executive in the American Thoroughbred horse racing industry, and a racehorse owner.

The son and grandson of race track owners, Cella was raised in St. Louis, Missouri. He studied at Washington and Lee University in Lexington, Virginia, and graduated with a B.A. degree in political science. He was a nationally ranked squash player and was a Life Member of the United States Squash Racquets Association.

The Southern Real Estate and Financial Company owns commercial properties in St. Louis and St. Louis County, including a handful of office buildings; the land at Kiener Plaza, which is leased long-term to the city of St. Louis; and several shopping centers: the Market Place and Clayprice Shopping Center in Ladue and the Shops at Clarkson Corner in Chesterfield. It also owns Busch's Grove, long a restaurant and more recently a grocery store.

Cella was a member of the third generation to head the Cella family's Oaklawn Jockey Club Inc., which owns and operates Oaklawn Park Race Track racetrack in Hot Springs, Arkansas. He took over as its president in 1968 on the death of his father, John G. Cella, a son of Louis Cella, whose syndicate once held a near-monopoly on the country's horse racing tracks outside of the coastal states.

John Cella had also owned Fort Erie Racetrack in Fort Erie, Ontario, Canada, but sold it in the 1950s to E. P. Taylor. An innovator, Charles J. Cella led Oaklawn Park Race Track to even greater success. Oaklawn Park is a member track with the Thoroughbred Racing Association; Cella served as the association's president in 1975–76. In 2005, the Cella family and Oaklawn Park received the Eclipse Award of Merit. In 2015, eventual Triple Crown winner American Pharoah began his record-setting season with a pair of victories at Oaklawn.

Cella owned racehorses, most notably Northern Spur, who was a colt racing in France in 1994 when Cella purchased him from his Japanese owner, Tomohiro Wada. Conditioned in the U.S. by Racing Hall of Fame trainer Ron McAnally, Northern Spur won the 1995 Breeders' Cup Turf.

Cella was chairman of the Knowlton Awards for Excellence at St. Louis' Barnes Hospital. He was an honorary trustee of the Schepens Eye Research Institute, an affiliate of Harvard Medical School and the world's largest independent eye research institute.

In 1999, he opened Truffles restaurant in Ladue, a St. Louis suburb.

Cella, 81, died on December 6, 2017, of complications from Parkinson's disease.

== Notes ==
- Charles J. Cella at the NTRA
- January 6, 2005 Bloodhorse.com article titled Oaklawn, Cella to Receive Eclipse Award of Merit
- Official Charles J. Cella profile at the Oaklawn Jockey Club, Inc.
