= Daylami =

Irish-bred Thoroughbred racehorse

- Racing silks of Aga Khan and Godolphin
- Sire: Doyoun
- Grandsire: Mill Reef
- Dam: Daltawa
- Damsire: Miswaki
- Sex: Stallion
- Foaled: 20 April 1994
- Died: 5 April 2023 (aged 28)
- Country: Ireland
- Colour: Grey
- Breeder: Aga Khan IV
- Owner: Aga Khan IV; Godolphin Stables (1998–)
- Trainer: Alain de Royer-Dupré; Saeed bin Suroor (1998–)
- Record: 19: 11–3–4
- Earnings: $4,614,762

Major wins
- Prix Herod (1996); Prix de Fontainebleau (1997); Poule d'Essai des Poulains (1997); Tattersalls Gold Cup (1998); Eclipse Stakes (1998); Man o' War Stakes (1998); Coronation Cup (1999); K. George VI & Q. Elizabeth Stakes (1999); Irish Champion Stakes (1999); Breeders' Cup Turf (1999)

Awards
- U.S. Champion Male Turf Horse (1999); European Horse of the Year (1999); European Champion Older Horse (1999); Timeform rating: 138
- Last updated on 7 September 2007

Daylami (20 April 1994 – 5 April 2023) was a Thoroughbred Champion racehorse and sire who was bred in Ireland, but trained in France, Dubai and the United Kingdom. In a career which lasted from 1996 until 1999, he raced in five countries and won seven Group 1/Grade I races. His 1999 performances earned him the United States' Eclipse Award for Outstanding Male Turf Horse and the Cartier Racing Award for European Horse of the Year.

== Background ==
Daylami, a "powerful" grey horse, standing 17 hands high, was bred in Ireland by his original owner, the Aga Khan, who also bred both of his parents.

Daylami's sire, Doyoun, won the 2,000 Guineas and finished third in the Derby, before a stud career in which he produced the winners of over two hundred races. His most notable offspring, apart from Daylami, was the Breeders' Cup Turf winner Kalanisi.

Daltawa, from whom Daylami inherited his grey coat, was also the dam of the Prix de l'Arc de Triomphe winner Dalakhani. She was a member of one of the families established by Marcel Boussac and eventually acquired by the Aga Khan.

He was first sent into training with Alain de Royer-Dupré at Chantilly. At the end of his three-year-old season he was bought by Godolphin and transferred to the stable of Saeed bin Suroor. His two most frequent jockeys were Gerald Mosse, and, after the move to Godolphin, Frankie Dettori.

Like many grey horses, Daylami changed in appearance as he aged. In his earliest races he had a dark, iron-grey appearance but looked almost white by the time of his retirement.

== Racing career ==
=== 1996: Two-year-old season ===
Daylami did not appear on the racecourse until the September of his two-year-old season, when he won a minor stakes race at Longchamp. Three weeks later, he was moved up in class and won the Listed Prix Herod at Évry. On his final start of the year he was moved up to the highest class to contest the Group One Critérium de Saint-Cloud. Starting favourite as part of a two-horse Aga Khan entry, Daylami was sent into the lead in the straight, but was caught in the closing stages and beaten three quarters of a length by Shaka.

The Aga Khan's colours, carried by Daylami in 1996 and 1997

=== 1997: Three-year-old season ===
As a three-year-old, Daylami was campaigned exclusively over one mile. He began by winning his first Group race, beating Loup Sauvage by two lengths in the Prix de Fontainebleau at Longchamp in April. Three weeks later, he beat the same horse, by the same margin, over the same course and distance to win the Group One Poule d'Essai des Poulains on soft ground, with Godolphin's Bahamian Bounty, winner of the Prix Morny and Middle Park Stakes, finishing last of the six runners. Although he had been entered in the Derby, Daylami's connections made it clear that the colt would be kept to shorter distances.

The colt was then sent abroad for the first time to contest the Group One St James's Palace Stakes at Royal Ascot. Daylami's striking appearance impressed observers and he was well fancied at 7/2, but in the race he seemed to be outpaced in the closing stages and finished a well-beaten third to Starborough. For his two remaining starts, Daylami returned to France, and continued to be tried over one mile. In both of these races, he proved the best of the three-year-old runners. He reversed the Ascot form with Starborough in the Prix Jacques Le Marois, but was beaten decisively by the four-year-old Spinning World. On his final start of the year, he finished third in a strong renewal of the Prix du Moulin de Longchamp behind Spinning World and Helissio.

The Godolphin colours, carried by Daylami in 1998 and 1999

=== 1998: Four-year-old season ===
Daylami's move to Godolphin in the winter of 1997/8 brought more than a change of location, as his new connections changed the focus of the horse's campaign to middle-distance events. (In Europe the term "middle distance" covers races that would be considered "long distance" in North America.) He began promisingly, carrying topweight of 9–4 (130 lbs) to victory at the Curragh in the Tattersalls Gold Cup (then a Group Two race).

He was a beaten favourite on his next run at Royal Ascot, when he finished third to his stable companion Faithful Son in the Group Two Prince of Wales's Stakes, but there were excuses for his defeat, as Dettori had been unable to find space for a clear run at a crucial stage in a race that was described as "one big bump". In addition, Daylami, as a Group One winner, had to carry five pounds more than the winner.

He reversed the form with Faithful Son at level weights to record his most valuable win so far in the Eclipse Stakes at Sandown two and a half weeks later. The form of the race was not particularly strong however, with Daylami being the only runner to have previously won a Group One event in Britain, France or Ireland. Most of the attention was drawn by the fact that Saeed bin Suroor was responsible for training Daylami, Faithful Son and Central Park, giving the Godolphin team first, second and third places in a Group One race. For his next start, he was moved up to the mile and a half distance for the first time in the King George VI and Queen Elizabeth Stakes in which he was ridden by Mick Kinane, Dettori having opted to ride Swain. Daylami started at 6/1 and ran up to expectations finishing fourth of the eight runners behind Swain, High-Rise and Royal Anthem.

In September 1998, Daylami was sent to the US for the Man o' War Stakes at Belmont Park. He raced close behind the leaders for most of the way, before being switched to the outside in the straight. He produced a strong late run to catch Buck's Boy in the closing stages and win by one and a quarter lengths. On his final European start of the year, Daylami was brought back to a mile and a quarter and was slightly disappointing, finishing third to the filly Alborada as the 6/5 favourite for the Champion Stakes.

The horse was again sent to the US in November 1998 to contest the Breeders' Cup Turf at Churchill Downs but was withdrawn after becoming unwell on the morning of the race. The race was won by Buck's Boy.

=== 1999: Five-year-old season ===
==== Spring ====
It is often assumed that thoroughbred racehorses reach their peak at the age of four a belief supported by the weight-for-age scale, which does not allow for any further improvement beyond that age. Daylami however, was still improving (see official ratings below) and in 1999 he had his best season in terms of wins and prize money. This vindicated the decision of his owners to keep him in training after they had decided that the horse had "more to give and... more to prove." It was also seen as part of a growing trend to keep top class flat racers in training for longer than had been the fashion in the 1970s and 1980s.

His season did not start particularly well. In the Dubai World Cup he was badly hampered, and although staying on strongly, he could finish only fifth to Almutawakel. He was then made favourite for the Tattersalls Gold Cup, which had been promoted to Group One level, but after taking the lead in the straight, he was overtaken in the closing stages and beaten two and a half lengths by the Japanese-bred filly Shiva.

==== Summer ====
It was from this point on that, Daylami (ridden in all his remaining races by Dettori) showed his best form. At Epsom he was third choice in the betting for the Coronation Cup behind Royal Anthem and the 1998 European Horse of the Year Dream Well, but produced a sustained run in the last quarter-mile to beat those rivals by three quarters of a length and half a length. This was Daylami's first win over a mile and a half, but the lack of early pace and slow time of 2:40.26 meant that the race did not conclusively prove his stamina. He had been expected to run in the Eclipse Stakes but was withdrawn from the race when his trainer decided that Daylami "needed more time". He continued to attract attention however, when beating the Group One winner Central Park by eight lengths in a "sparkling" exercise trial.

In July, he was an easy and "impressive" winner of the King George VI and Queen Elizabeth Stakes, taking the lead over a furlong out and pulling away to win by five lengths. Although Daylami's connections were pleased, with Dettori talking enthusiastically about the "ultimate champion", some observers, including the Independent's correspondent, were less convinced, pointing out that the field for the King George had been well below its usual standard.

==== Autumn ====
Daylami ran next in the Irish Champion Stakes at Leopardstown in which he produced what was probably his best performance. Despite his win at Ascot, Daylami started only second favourite behind Royal Anthem, who had recently won the Group One International Stakes at York by eight lengths. The two horses so dominated the build-up to the race that one prominent bookmaker announced that they would treat the race as a match for betting purposes. After tracking the leaders in the early stages, Daylami moved through "easily" on the inside to take the lead in the straight and drew right away to win by nine lengths from the filly Dazzling Park, with Dream Well third and Royal Anthem fifth. His performance was given a figure of 136 by the official handicapper, the third highest recorded in Europe in the 1990s, behind only Generous and Peintre Celebre.

Daylami was sent to Paris for the Prix de l'Arc de Triomphe in October, although his connections made it clear that the heavy ground would not suit their horse and even considered withdrawing him. He made no impression in the race and was eased down by Dettori in the straight, eventually finishing ninth behind Montjeu.

In his final race, Daylami was sent to Florida for the Breeders' Cup Turf at Gulfstream Park. The venue, with its warm climate and tight, seven-furlong turf circuit was believed to be particularly challenging for European horses, with none of them having won when the Breeders' Cup was run there in 1989 and 1992. Dettori's ability on American tracks had also been questioned after he had ridden a "bizarre" race on Swain in the previous year's Classic. Buck's Boy led early, and exerted pressure from the front, running 1:10.60 for the first six furlongs. Daylami was always running prominently, and was moved up to third behind Buck's Boy and Royal Anthem entering the straight. He produced a powerful late run to take the lead inside the final furlong and stayed on strongly to win by two and a half lengths from Royal Anthem with Buck's Boy third. As he returned on Daylami after the race Dettori shouted "What about Swain now!" in reference to the criticism he had received.

Daylami was then retired to stud.

== Assessment ==
In the International Classification (the forerunner of the World Thoroughbred Racehorse Rankings), for 1998 Daylami was rated on 123, eight pounds behind the top-weighted Skip Away In the Classification for 1999 Daylami was rated the best horse in the world, equal with Montjeu on a rating of 135.

In January 2000, Daylami was awarded the titles of Horse of the Year and Top Older Horse at the Cartier Racing Awards. In the same month he was named American Champion Male Turf Horse at the Eclipse Awards and finished runner up to Charismatic in the vote for American Horse of the Year, despite having run only once in the United States in the qualifying period.

Daylami earned his owners a $1,000,000 prize as the winner of the inaugural World Series Racing Championship, a competition in which points were awarded for performances in nine major international middle-distance races.

Daylami was given a Timeform rating of 138, making him the equal of Nijinsky and Cigar.

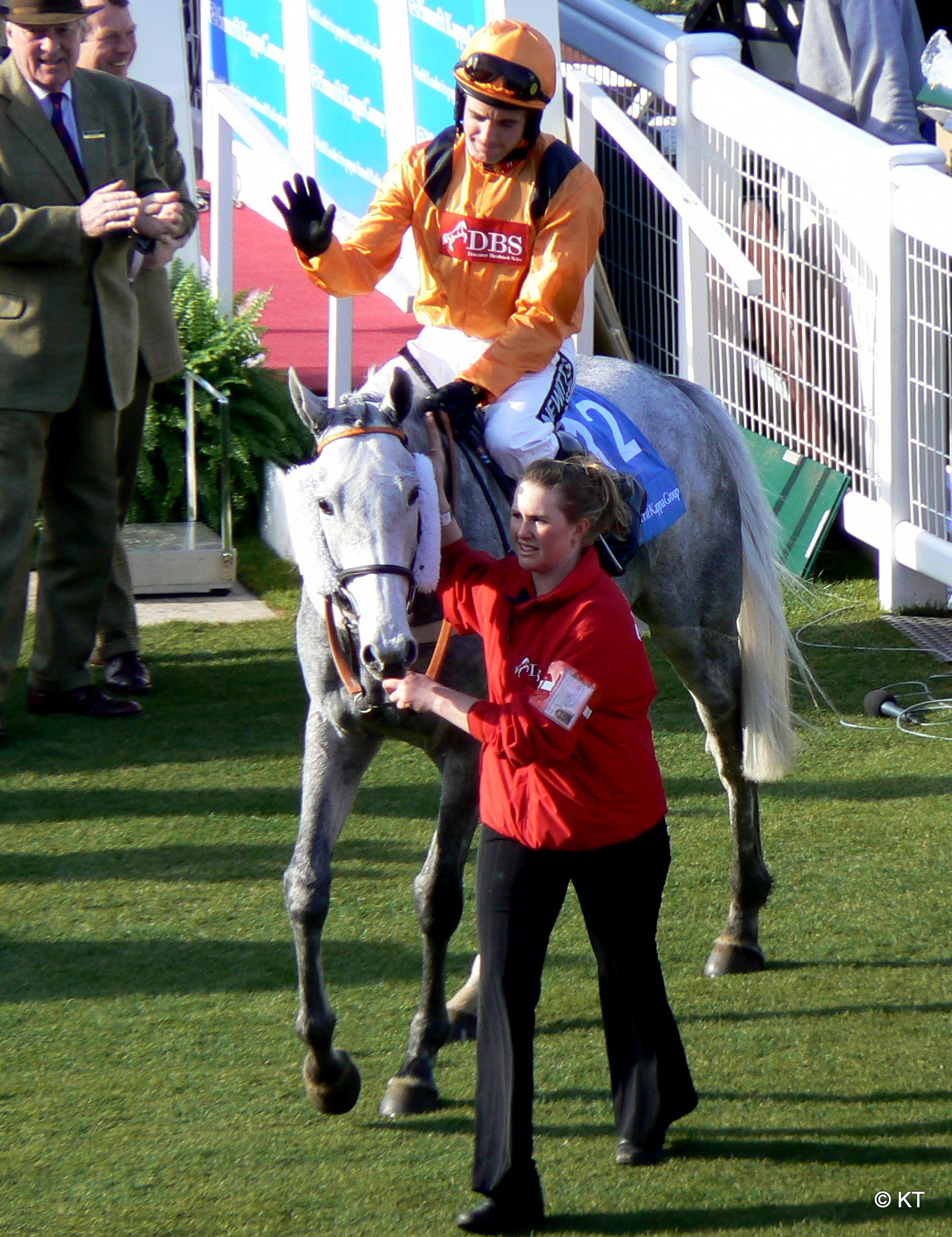
Zaynar, by Daylami, winner of the 2009 Triumph Hurdle

== Stud career ==
Through a joint ownership between his breeder, the Aga Khan IV, and Darley Stud, he stood as a sire at the Aga Khan's Gilltown Stud near Kilcullen, County Kildare, Ireland until 2006 when he was sent to his Haras de Bonneval stud at Le Mesnil-Mauger in France.

At the end of November 2006, Daylami was sold to Riethuiskraal Stud of South Africa owned by Altus Joubert, Chairman of the South Africa Thoroughbred Breeders' Association.

In 2010 Daylami returned to Ireland to join Coolagown Stud, near Fermoy, County Cork, Ireland.

Daylami sired the winners of more than four hundred races. The best of his progeny was Grey Swallow, winner of the 2004 Irish Derby and 2005 Tattersalls Gold Cup. His other notable offspring included Voila Ici (Premio Roma, Gran Premio di Milano), Indian Days (Bosphorus Cup x2) and the hurdler Zaynar (Triumph Hurdle). He was pensioned in 2014 and was euthanized on 5 April 2023 due to infirmities of old age.

== Pedigree ==
Pedigree of Daylami (IRE) grey stallion 1994
| Sire Doyoun | Mill Reef | Never Bend | Nasrullah |
| Sire Doyoun | Mill Reef | Never Bend | Lalun |
| Sire Doyoun | Mill Reef | Milan Mill | Princequillo |
| Sire Doyoun | Mill Reef | Milan Mill | Virginia Water |
| Sire Doyoun | Dumka | Kashmir | Tudor Melody |
| Sire Doyoun | Dumka | Kashmir | Queen of Speed |
| Sire Doyoun | Dumka | Faizebad | Prince Taj |
| Sire Doyoun | Dumka | Faizebad | Floralie |
| Dam Daltawa | Miswaki | Mr. Prospector | Raise a Native |
| Dam Daltawa | Miswaki | Mr. Prospector | Gold Digger |
| Dam Daltawa | Miswaki | Hopespringseternal | Buckpasser |
| Dam Daltawa | Miswaki | Hopespringseternal | Rose Bower |
| Dam Daltawa | Damana | Crystal Palace | Caro |
| Dam Daltawa | Damana | Crystal Palace | Hermieres |
| Dam Daltawa | Damana | Denia | Crepello |
| Dam Daltawa | Damana | Denia | Rose Ness (family: 9-e) |
