= Madeleine A. Pickens =

Iraqi American businesswoman and philanthropist

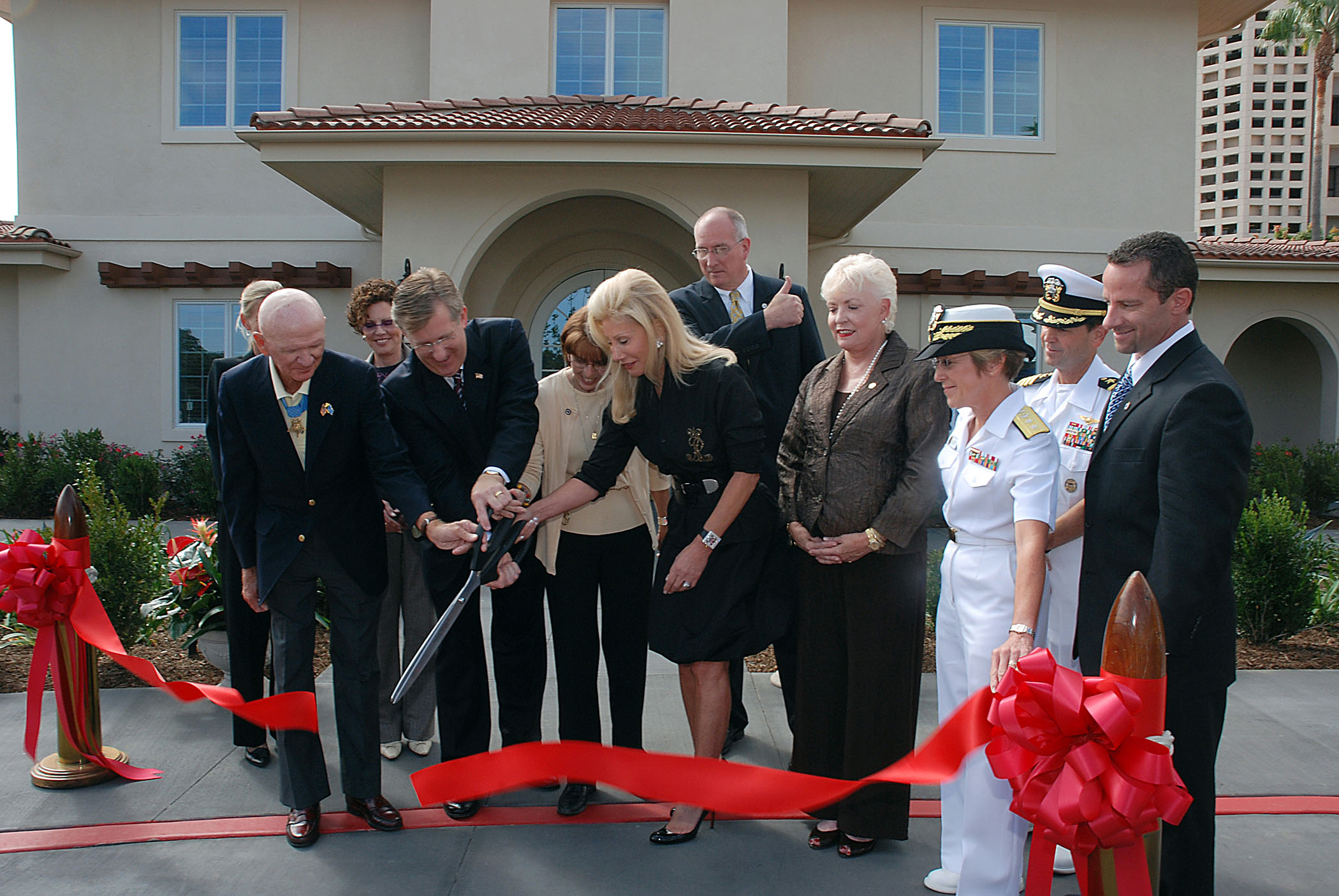
- Pickens (4th from left) at a ribbon-cutting for a 2008 grand opening at the Naval Medical Center San Diego
- Born: Kirkuk, Kingdom of Iraq
- Other names: Madeleine Farris, Madeleine Richter, Madeleine Paulson
- Occupations: Business Owner, philanthropist
- Spouse(s): include Allen E. Paulson (1988-2000) and T. Boone Pickens (2005-2012)
- Children: 1
- Honors: Equine Advocates Award (2007); ABC News Person of the Week (21 November 2008)

Madeleine Anne Pickens (born 5 March 1947) is a businesswoman and philanthropist who has lived in the United States since 1969. She is a developer of and stockholder in the Del Mar Country Club in Rancho Santa Fe, California, and the owner of the Mustang Monument: Wild Horse Eco-Resort near Wells, Nevada and the founder of Saving America's Mustangs. She is also a thoroughbred racehorse owner and breeder. She is the widow of American businessman Allen E. Paulson and former wife of multi-millionaire T. Boone Pickens.

== Background ==
Madeleine Pickens was born in Kirkuk, Kingdom of Iraq, to a British father and a Lebanese mother. Her father, Bill Baker, was a British oil executive. He was also a golf course designer, who built a golf course in Kirkuk and cut down his golf clubs to teach the five-year old Madeleine to play. After her family left Iraq, Pickens grew up in France and England, where Baker designed several courses. Pickens and her twin sister Christine, both British citizens, moved from England to the Bahamas in 1965. At some point she started using the name Madeleine Farris.

Pickens modeled and worked as a flight attendant for Pan American Airlines in her twenties. She moved to Marina Del Rey, California in 1969 and went into business for herself, providing cabin service crews for corporate jets and special charter flights. In 1976, she was featured in an article in Black Belt magazine. She was married to Robert Richter, with whom she had a daughter, Dominique, in 1980.

She met Allen Paulson, the founder of Gulfstream Aerospace in 1983, and married him in 1988. In 1993 they bought the Del Mar Country Club in Rancho Santa Fe, California, where she drew upon her background to design and build the golf course. Upon Paulson's death in 2000, she and his children from his previous marriages disputed over the estate until 2003, at which time she was awarded in the settlement, among other assets, stock in the Country Club. In September 2015, the IRS filed suit against beneficiaries of Paulson's estate, including Pickens, for unpaid estate taxes. On September 10, 2018, a judge ruled Pickens was not liable for the taxes.

In 2005, she married Texas oilman T. Boone Pickens. Not long after their marriage, the couple traveled to New Orleans to rescue pets stranded during the evacuation from Hurricane Katrina and flew them to California and Colorado on a chartered cargo jet. They divorced early in 2013.

In 2007, Pickens paid $35 million for a home on the beach in Del Mar; in 2010 she sued the city for ordering her to prune plants that were obstructing her neighbors' view. Pickens has sponsored several events at the Del Mar Country Club benefiting military organizations. In July 2016, Pickens, Jenny Craig, and Doug Manchester co-chaired a fundraiser for Donald Trump at the Del Mar Country Club in Rancho Santa Fe.

== Equine interests ==
Pickens is said to be a lifelong equestrian. She developed an interest in thoroughbred flat racing and with Allen Paulson, she owned several race horses, including U.S. Racing Hall of Fame inductee Cigar. She traded Cigar to husband Allen for the filly, Eliza, the 1992 Breeders' Cup Juvenile Fillies winner and that year's Eclipse Award winner as American Champion Two-Year-Old Filly. Pickens' other horses included Fraise, who won the 1992 Breeders' Cup Turf; Yokohama, winner of the 1997 Prix Foy at Longchamp Racecourse; and Rock Hard Ten, winner of the 2005 Santa Anita Handicap. Pickens and Jenny Craig owned Rock and Roll who won the 1998 Pennsylvania Derby and ran in the Kentucky Derby. Pickens also raced Miss Dominique, named for her daughter.

After the settlement of Paulson's estate, Pickens no longer had colors to race, although she was still part owner of Rock Hard Ten and a few broodmares. She announced in June 2005 that, upon her marriage to T. Boone Pickens, her involvement with racing would be reduced. At the same time, she took up equine welfare causes when Old Friends Equine purchased Fraise and multiple Grade One winner Ogygian from their Japanese owners and she paid the $65,000 to bring them back to retirement at the Old Friends facility in Georgetown, Kentucky. About a year after their marriage, the couple led the fight to close the last horse slaughterhouse in the United States. The slaughterhouses were closed due to Congress's prohibiting funds to pay inspectors in the year appropriations bills, but the Pickens worked for a more permanent solution by lobbying Congress to pass the American Horse Slaughter Prevention Act (AHSPA), which passed in the United States House of Representatives, but not in the Senate (in 2015, the AHSPA was folded into the proposed Safeguard American Food Exports Act). In recognition of their efforts, in 2007 Madeleine and Boone Pickens received the Equine Advocates' Safe Home Equine Protection Award.

In the summer of 2008, the Bureau of Land Management (BLM), was faced with a budget crisis in its free-roaming horse program due to the cost of maintaining 33,000 excess (unadopted) horses captured on public lands in holding facilities. The agency was considering implementing the options that Congress had provided for in amendments to the Wild and Free-Roaming Horses and Burros Act of 1971, to either euthanize or sell the horses "without limitation" to any willing buyer. Since "any willing buyer" included those that would send the horses to slaughter in foreign countries, Pickens established "The National Wild Horse Foundation," to create a sanctuary for excess horses. On November 21, 2008, Pickens was named Person of the Week by ABC News due to her announcement that she would adopt and maintain, with private funds, all 33,000 horses at the sanctuary. However, shortly thereafter she stated that the recession forced many of the donors she hoped would help her pay for the venture backed out, and she requested the BLM pay her a yearly stipend of $500 per horse to maintain the horses. The BLM responded that it was not possible to enter into the contract she requested.

In January 2010, Pickens hired three helicopters to view and photograph a BLM horse gather, and at one point they flew across the flight path of other helicopters being used to herd animals, leading to the accusation she had interfered with the gather. A year later, a $500,000 float she sponsored for the Tournament of Roses Parade depicted a Native American on a horse watching over several galloping horses. The day before the parade, the National Tribal Horse Coalition issued a news release objecting to the float for using "the symbolism of the North American Indians and horses to promote agendas in direct opposition to the tribes' position."

Also in 2010, Pickens purchased property in Elko County in northeast Nevada; the 14,000 acre Spruce Ranch in the remote Goshute Valley for $2,570,000. Shortly afterwards, she purchased the Warm Creek Ranch which is located about 25 miles south of Wells, Nevada on Highway 93, adjacent to the northwest boundary of the 508,000 acre BLM Spruce Mountain grazing allotment. In March 2011, the BLM put out invitations for Pickens and others who wished to provide lands to maintain horses for the BLM in "Eco_Sanctuaries" to submit proposals for evaluation. Saving America's Mustangs, the formerly named National Wild Horse Foundation to which Pickens had transferred title to the Spruce Ranch, submitted a proposal to maintain horses, that the BLM agreed to evaluate in April 2012. In August 2012, the BLM published the proposal in the Federal Register but in June 2014 the evaluation stalled after scoping found issues that have yet to be resolved. Although she has purchased several hundred horses at risk of slaughter and maintains them on the private lands of the ranches, in 2014 Saving America's Mustangs leased the Spruce Allotment grazing permit to the Spruce Grazing Association that instead grazes cows. On December 21, 2017, the BLM announced it would be rounding up horses in the area of the Spruce allotment. On August 25, 2018, the BLM announced an emergency gather of 300 horses at Boone Spring within the allotment.

== Mustang Monument Eco-Resort ==
Initially, the Warm Creek Ranch headquarters was slated to be used as the "base of operations" for the eco-sanctuary. However, on September 11, 2012, Pickens made reference to plans for a luxury resort called the Mustang Monument: Wild Horse Eco-Resort. Pickens began converting the headquarters for the resort, and began renovating the old ranch house there to become a dining hall and kitchen. On April 3, 2013, the Elko County Commission approved a liquor license for the venture, and Pickens spent a million dollars on "Safari Tents" or Tee Pees for the guests. The eco-resort was open for business in the summer of 2014 and, among other things, offered horseback rides on BLM-administered public lands and using a road crossing BLM administered lands to the Spruce Ranch to take guests to see the horses kept there. Pickens states she was informed by the BLM in December of that year that she would need a permit to use the road and public lands for her commercial ventures and that she filed the application for the permit. Pickens claims that in October 2015 the BLM told her the paperwork had been misplaced, and her representative claims that the BLM requested trivial information to process the application. Also, Elko County officials determined that the food preparation facilities she planned did not meet the County health and safety codes, and required her to install a commercial kitchen. By February 2016 the BLM had not finished processing the permit application and the county's safety codes had not yet been met. The County required Pickens to, in case of fire, to put sprinkler systems in the lavishly furnished teepees, and because the town of Wells had, in 2008, suffered a major earthquake, she was required to modify the walk-in cooler in the kitchen to be earthquake-proof. Pickens issued a press release on February 10, 2016, stating the resort would not open for 2016, but although the Mustang Monument website stated she hoped to open in 2017 and having spent $25 million on the venture, she stated on September 1, 2016, she was "out of it" and would sell the Tee Pees. George Knapp, an investigative reporter for a Las Vegas television station, reported that Pickens said that she had made a bad decision and she would not spend more money on the venture. The webpage for Mustang Monument announced the facility was closed in 2016. In the beginning of 2019, Mustang Monument announced it has re-opened for the summer season.

Pickens stated that her problems with acquiring the BLM permit are due to her being "a tall tree" that "catch(es) the wind." Pickens' representative suggested the real reasons for Elko County's safety requirements were due to local hostility to a wild horse sanctuary and because Pickens was from California, and Knapp, a Coast to Coast AM host that had Pickens' representative on as a guest in 2012, expanded upon that to imply that they were imposed because Pickens was "rich, blonde, female, and...from California." Adding to the conflicts in 2016, a lawsuit against Saving America's Mustangs and the Del Mar Country Club was filed for an alleged racially motivated hostile work environment at the Country Club and Mustang Monument in 2014. As of January 2017, that lawsuit was pending.

== Politics ==
Since 2010 Pickens has donated extensively to Republican political campaigns, including the Donald Trump presidential campaign and numerous state Republican parties.
