= Northern Spur =

Irish-bred Thoroughbred racehorse

- Sire: Sadler's Wells
- Grandsire: Northern Dancer
- Dam: Fruition
- Damsire: Rheingold
- Sex: Stallion
- Foaled: 1991
- Country: Ireland
- Colour: Bay
- Breeder: Swettenham Stud
- Owner: Tomohiro Wada; Charles J. Cella (at age 4)
- Trainer: André Fabre (France); Ron McAnally (USA)
- Record: 15: 6-4-3
- Earnings: $1,605,856

Major wins
- Prix du Lys (1994); Prix Hubert de Chaudenay (1994); Oak Tree Invitational Stakes (1995); Breeders' Cup Turf (1995)

Awards
- United States Champion Male Turf Horse (1995)

Honours
- Northern Spur Breeders' Cup Stakes at Oaklawn Park
- Last updated on June 24, 2007

Northern Spur (foaled 1991 in Ireland – died February 24, 2016) was a Thoroughbred racehorse who raced in France and the United States. Bred at Robert Sangster's Swettenham Stud in Swettenham, Cheshire, England, he was a son of the champion sire Sadler's Wells and out of the mare, Fruition. His damsire, Rheingold, won the 1973 Prix de l'Arc de Triomphe.

Sent to French trainer André Fabre for conditioning, in 1994 Northern Spur notably won the Prix du Lys and the Prix Hubert de Chaudenay before being sold to American Charles J. Cella, owner of Oaklawn Park racetrack in Hot Springs, Arkansas. Brought to race in the United States, Northern Spur won the 1995 Oak Tree Invitational Stakes and capped off the year with a win in the 1½ mile Breeders' Cup Turf. His best result at age five was a second-place finish in the 1996 Grade I Hollywood Turf Handicap. His performances in 1995 earned him the Eclipse Award for Outstanding Male Turf Horse.

Retired, Northern Spur stood at Foggy Bottom Farm in Geneseo, New York. To date, his offspring have met with modest racing success.

Northern Spur died in early February 24, 2016 following a bout with colic.
