= Fraise =

American-bred Thoroughbred racehorse

- Sire: Strawberry Road
- Grandsire: Whiskey Road
- Dam: Zalataia
- Damsire: Dictus
- Sex: Stallion
- Foaled: April 13, 1988
- Died: November 7, 2005
- Country: United States
- Colour: Bay
- Breeder: Allen E. Paulson
- Owner: Madeleine A. Paulson
- Trainer: William I. Mott
- Record: 34: 10-5-6
- Earnings: US$2,613,105

Major wins
- Round Table Handicap (1991); Sword Dancer Handicap (1992); Pan American Handicap (1993, 1994); Hollywood Turf Cup Stakes (1993) Breeders' Cup wins: Breeders' Cup Turf (1992)

Fraise (1988–2005) was an American Thoroughbred racehorse best known for winning the 1992 Breeders' Cup Turf.

== Background ==
Fraise was a bay horse bred by Allen E. Paulson. He was sired by Strawberry Road, the 1983 Australian Horse of the Year, acquired by Paulson in 1986. His dam, Zalataia, acquired by Paulson in 1983, raced in France and the United States, notably winning the Grand Prix de Deauville and the Grade I Oak Tree Invitational Stakes.

Fraise, which is French for strawberry, was raced by Madeleine Paulson, who won the colt on a wager with her husband by beating him in a golf game.

== Racing career ==
Trained for racing on turf by future U.S. Racing Hall of Fame inductee Bill Mott, Fraise did not race at age two but made ten starts in 1991 at age three, notably winning the Round Table Handicap at Chicago's Arlington Park.

Age four was Fraise's best year in racing when he won five of his ten starts. He got his first Grade I win in the Sword Dancer Handicap at Saratoga Race Course on August 8, 1992, setting a course record while winning by four lengths. He followed this up with a fourth-place finish in the Man o' War Stakes and a second place in the Turf Classic Invitational, both at Belmont. On October 31, the mile-and-a-half Breeders' Cup Turf was hosted by Gulfstream Park Racetrack in Hallandale Beach, Florida. Facing a top-class international field, Fraise was sent off at odds of 14-1. He was up against Sky Classic, the even-money favorite from Canada, Subotica, that year's winner of the Prix de l'Arc de Triomphe, and two Epsom Derby winners, Dr Devious (1992) and Quest for Fame (1991). Fraise was in the last place for most of the race, then started his move on the far turn with jockey Patrick Valenzuela guiding him through traffic. As they entered the stretch, Valenzuela spotted a small hole on the rail and Fraise responded with a strong drive to win by a nose over Sky Classic (ridden by Pat Day). He finished the year in the Hollywood Turf Cup Stakes, in which he was disqualified to second for interference. In the Eclipse Award voting for champion turf male, Fraise finished second to Sky Classic.

Fraise returned to racing at age five, starting with a win in the Grade II Pan American Handicap at Gulfstream Park in Florida. He then suffered a splint injury while finishing third in the San Juan Capistrano at Santa Anita and missed several months. In October, he finished fifth in the Turf Classic at Belmont, then finished fourth in the Breeders' Cup Turf despite a rough trip. He ended the year in the Grade I Hollywood Turf Cup Stakes at Hollywood Park Racetrack in California, winning by a stakes record six lengths.

At age six, Fraise raced seven times with one win in the Pan American Handicap before his breeding rights were sold to Japanese interests. Fraise finished his career with a tenth-place finish in the 1994 Japan Cup.

== Retirement ==
In Japan, Fraise entered stud duty in 1995. He stood for eight years but was largely unsuccessful. Eventually gelded, he was used as a lesson horse at the Olympic Riding Club in Chiba, Japan. In the summer of 2005, original owner Madeleine Paulson provided the Old Friends Equine retirement facility in Georgetown, Kentucky with a substantial gift to enable them to acquire the horse, bring him home from Japan, and look after him during his retirement years.

On November 7, 2005, the seventeen-year-old Fraise died suddenly from a ruptured blood vessel in his abdomen. He was cremated and his remains were interred in the Old Friends Dream Chase Farm cemetery.
