= Dangerous Midge =

American-bred Thoroughbred racehorse

- Sire: Lion Heart
- Grandsire: Tale of the Cat
- Dam: Adored Slew
- Damsire: Seattle Slew
- Sex: Colt
- Foaled: 4 March 2006
- Country: United States
- Colour: Bay
- Breeder: Tony Holmes & Walter Zent
- Owner: Ijaz Parvizi
- Trainer: Brian J. Meehan
- Record: 15: 6-0-1
- Earnings: £1,109,761

Major wins
- Old Newton Cup (2010); Arc Trial (2010); Breeders' Cup Turf (2010)

Dangerous Midge (foaled 4 March 2006) is an American-bred, British-trained thoroughbred racehorse. He is best known for winning the Breeders' Cup Turf in 2010.

== Background ==
Dangerous Midge is a bay horse bred in Kentucky. He was sired by Lion Heart, who finished runner-up to Smarty Jones in the 2004 Kentucky Derby and went on to win the Haskell Invitational Handicap. As a descendant of the broodmare La Troienne, Dangerous Midge is closely related to many notable thoroughbreds including Buckpasser, Go For Gin, Sea Hero, Allez France and Easy Goer. As a yearling he was consigned to the Keeneland sales where he was bought for $120,000 by the bloodstock agent Angela Sykes. He subsequently entered into the ownership of Iraj Parvizi and was sent to England to be trained by Brian Meehan at Manton, Wiltshire.

== Racing career ==
=== 2009: three-year-old season ===
Unraced as a two-year-old, Dangerous Midge made his first racecourse appearance when finishing unplaced in a maiden race at Sandown Park Racecourse in June 2009. Two weeks later he recorded his first win when taking a ten furlong maiden race at Salisbury Racecourse. In July, Dangerous Midge finished third, carrying 132 pounds in a handicap race at Bath Racecourse. On his final start of the year he produced a strong finish to win a minor stakes event at Doncaster in September.

=== 2010: four-year-old season ===
Dangerous Midge began his second season in April by winning a handicap at Doncaster by five lengths. He then finished unplaced in handicaps at York Racecourse in May and Royal Ascot in June. In July, he was sent to Haydock to contest the Old Newton Cup. Racing over one and a half miles he took the lead two furlongs from the finish and pulled clear to win by eight lengths. In August, Dangerous Midge was moved up in distance to contest the Ebor Handicap over fourteen furlongs at York, where he finished eighth of the twenty runners behind Dirar. In September, Dangerous Midge was moved up in class to run in the Group Three Arc Trial at Newbury Racecourse. He took the lead in the straight and pulled clear of the field to win by four lengths from the odds-on favourite Rainbow Peak. Following his Newbury win, Dangerous Midge was sent across the Atlantic for the Breeders' Cup Turf at Churchill Downs. Running in his first Grade One race, he started at odds of 5/1 in a field of seven. Ridden by Frankie Dettori, he took the lead in the straight and won by one and a quarter lengths from Champ Pegasus.

=== 2011: five-year-old season ===
Dangerous Midge failed to reproduce his Breeders' Cup form in 2011. He finished unplaced in all four of his starts, finishing last on three occasions. After finishing unplaced in two more races in 2012 Dangerous Midge was retired from racing. He was sold and exported to stand as a stallion in Chile at the Agricola Santa Nadia.

== Pedigree ==
Pedigree of Dangerous Midge (USA), bay stallion, 2006
| Sire Lion Heart (USA) 2001 | Tale of the Cat; 1994 | Storm Cat | Storm Bird |
| Sire Lion Heart (USA) 2001 | Tale of the Cat; 1994 | Storm Cat | Terlingua |
| Sire Lion Heart (USA) 2001 | Tale of the Cat; 1994 | Yarn | Mr. Prospector |
| Sire Lion Heart (USA) 2001 | Tale of the Cat; 1994 | Yarn | Narrate |
| Sire Lion Heart (USA) 2001 | Satin Sunrise; 1990 | Mr Leader | Hail to Reason |
| Sire Lion Heart (USA) 2001 | Satin Sunrise; 1990 | Mr Leader | Jolie Deja |
| Sire Lion Heart (USA) 2001 | Satin Sunrise; 1990 | Logic | Naskra |
| Sire Lion Heart (USA) 2001 | Satin Sunrise; 1990 | Logic | Bactu Reason |
| Dam Adored Slew (USA) 1990 | Seattle Slew; 1974 | Bold Reasoning | Boldnesian |
| Dam Adored Slew (USA) 1990 | Seattle Slew; 1974 | Bold Reasoning | Reason to Earn |
| Dam Adored Slew (USA) 1990 | Seattle Slew; 1974 | My Charmer | Poker |
| Dam Adored Slew (USA) 1990 | Seattle Slew; 1974 | My Charmer | Fair Charmer |
| Dam Adored Slew (USA) 1990 | Affirmatively; 1981 | Affirmed | Exclusive Native |
| Dam Adored Slew (USA) 1990 | Affirmatively; 1981 | Affirmed | Wont Tell You |
| Dam Adored Slew (USA) 1990 | Affirmatively; 1981 | Straight Deal II | Hail to Reason |
| Dam Adored Slew (USA) 1990 | Affirmatively; 1981 | Straight Deal II | No Fiddling (Family: 1-x) |
