= Red Rocks (horse) =

Irish Thoroughbred racehorse

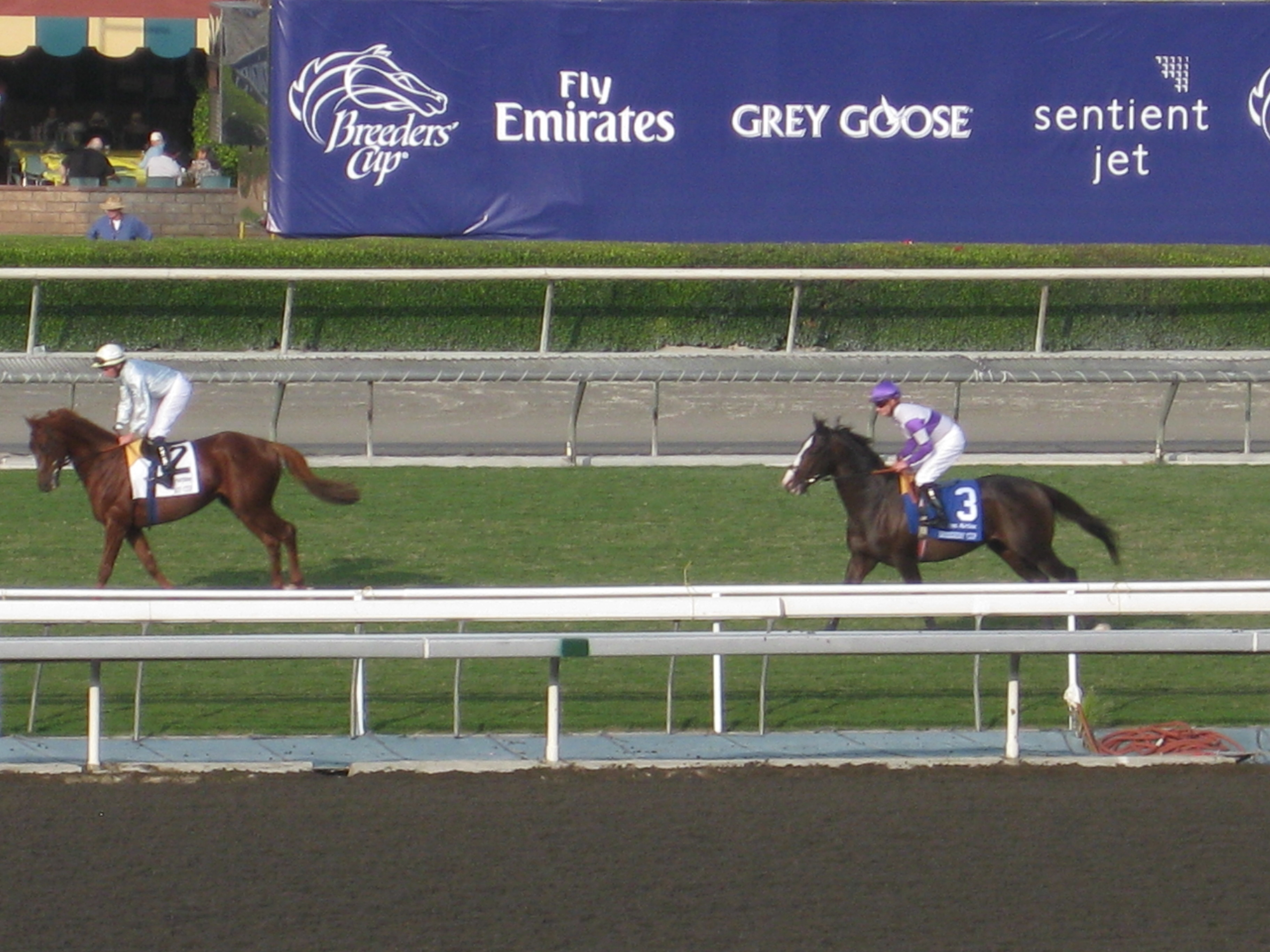
- Red Rocks (#3) before his final start in the 2009 Breeders' Cup Turf
- Sire: Galileo
- Grandsire: Sadler's Wells
- Dam: Pharmacist
- Damsire: Machiavellian
- Sex: Stallion
- Foaled: 8 April 2003
- Died: 22 September 2018
- Country: Ireland
- Colour: Dark Bay
- Breeder: Ballylinch Stud
- Owner: J. Paul Reddam
- Trainer: Brian Meehan
- Record: 24: 6-4-3
- Earnings: £1,406, 259 (equivalent)

Major wins
- Breeders' Cup Turf (2006); Gordon Richards Stakes (2007); Man o' War Stakes (2008)

Awards
- Timeform rating: 124
- Last updated on 11 July 2008

Red Rocks (8 April 2003 – 22 September 2018) was an Irish-bred, British-trained Thoroughbred racehorse.

== Background ==
Red Rocks is a bay horse with a white blaze and a long white sock on his left hind leg bred by Ballylinch Stud in County Kilkenny. He was sired by Galileo, a son of the fourteen-time Champion sire in Great Britain & Ireland, Sadler's Wells. Red Rocks' dam, Pharmacist, is a daughter of Machiavellian, a multiple Group One winner who was a son of North American Champion sire, Mr. Prospector.

== Racing career ==
A non-winner as a two-year-old, Red Rocks made his racing debut in September 2005, finishing ninth in a Conditions stakes at Newbury Racecourse. In his only other starts, at Newmarket Racecourse he earned a third in a race for maidens then a second-place finish in the Houghton Conditions Stakes.

Three-year-old Red Rocks won a maiden stakes race in April 2006 at Windsor Racecourse and followed that up with another win in May's Fairway Stakes, a listed race at Newmarket. In June he was second in the King Edward VII Stakes at Ascot Racecourse then in July ran second to Rail Link in the Grand Prix de Paris at Longchamp Racecourse in Paris, France. After another second-place result in August's Great Voltigeur Stakes at York Racecourse, in September he was third in York's St. Leger Stakes. In November, Red Rocks was sent to Churchill Downs in Louisville, Kentucky. There, under jockey Frankie Dettori, he won the most important race of his career, the Breeders' Cup Turf. His win came over a strong international field that included Better Talk Now, English Channel, Cacique, and the 2005 World Champion, Hurricane Run.

At age four, Red Rocks made his debut in March in the Dubai Sheema Classic at Nad Al Sheba Racecourse in Dubai where he ran ninth to winner Vengeance of Rain. In April he got back on track with a win in the Group 3 Gordon Richards Stakes at Sandown Park. In June he finished fourth in the Ascot Gold Cup then did not race again until September when he ran fourth to Dylan Thomas in the Irish Champion Stakes at Leopardstown Racecourse near Dublin, Ireland.

Red Rocks returned to the United States in October 2007 to defend his Breeders' Cup Turf title and ran a strong third on "yielding" turf at Monmouth Park in New Jersey. In his final outing of 2007, Red Rocks finished seventh in the Hong Kong Vase at Sha Tin Racecourse in Hong Kong. Racing in England in May 2008, Red Rocks won a conditions race at Lingfield Park Racecourse in Lingfield, Surrey and then finished sixth in the Coronation Cup at Epsom Downs Racecourse. Red Rocks won his next start in the 12 July 2008 Grade I Man o' War Stakes at Belmont Park in Elmont, New York in which he defeated Curlin.

== Stud career ==
Red Rocks was retired from racing to stand as a breeding stallion at the Centro Equino Arcadia in Italy. His first crop of foals will begin racing in 2013. He moved to Calumet Farm in 2015. He died on 22 September 2018
