= Brian Meehan =

Brian Meehan may refer to:

- Brian Meehan (racehorse trainer)
- Brian Meehan (criminal)

== See also ==
- Bryan Meehan, Irish businessman
