= Buck's Boy =

American-bred Thoroughbred racehorse

- Sire: Bucksplasher
- Grandsire: Buckpasser
- Dam: Molly's Colleen
- Damsire: Verbatim
- Sex: Gelding
- Foaled: 1993
- Died: January 27, 2022 (aged 28–29)
- Country: United States
- Colour: Bay
- Breeder: Irish Acres Farm
- Owner: Quarter B Farm
- Trainer: P. Noel Hickey
- Record: 30: 16-5-2
- Earnings: $2,750,148

Major wins
- Hawthorne Gold Cup Handicap (1997); Pan American Handicap (1998, 2000); Turf Classic Invitational Stakes (1998); Hong Kong Jockey Club Trophy Stakes (1998); Riggs Handicap (1998) Breeders' Cup wins: Breeders' Cup Turf (1998)

Awards
- United States' Champion Male Turf Horse (1998)
- Last updated on August 27, 2007

Buck's Boy (1993 – January 27, 2022) was an American Thoroughbred racehorse.

== Background ==
He was bred by horseman Noel Hickey's Irish Acres Farm of Ocala, Florida who sold him to George Bunn of Quarter B Farm in Pleasant Plains, Illinois. Out of Noel Hickey's mare Molly's Colleen, by multiple stakes winner, Verbatim, his grandsire was U.S. Racing Hall of Fame inductee and U.S. Horse of the Year, Buckpasser.

== Racing career ==
Conditioned by Noel Hickey, Buck's Boy was sent to the track at age three, making six starts of which he won three. In 1997 he had nine starts, winning five, the most important of which was the Hawthorne Gold Cup Handicap. In the 1997 Breeders' Cup Turf, he finished third behind winner, Chief Bearhart.

At age five, Buck's Boy was the United States' Champion Male Turf Horse, winning several important races including the Turf Classic Invitational Stakes and the Riggs Handicap then capping off his season by winning the 1998 Breeders' Cup Turf in which he defeated a field that included the parimutuel betting favorite, Royal Anthem.

A gelding, Buck's Boy raced in 1999 and 2000, winning five of his thirteen starts including his second 1½ mile Pan American Handicap at Gulfstream Park.

== Retirement and death ==
At the end of 2000, he was retired to his owner's Quarter B Farm in Pleasant Plains, Illinois. Buck's Boy died on January 27, 2022, at the age of 29 (Note: All horses were deemed to born on January 1.).
