= Kashmir (horse) =

Irish-bred Thoroughbred racehorse

- Sire: Tudor Melody
- Grandsire: Tudor Minstrel
- Dam: Queen of Speed
- Damsire: Blue Train
- Sex: Stallion
- Foaled: 1963
- Country: Ireland
- Colour: Dark Bay or Brown
- Breeder: Jane Levins Moore
- Owner: Peter Butler
- Trainer: Mick Bartholomew
- Record: 10:5-2-2
- Earnings: £30,596 in Britain; 314,345 NF in France

Major wins
- Prix Robert Papin (1965); Prix Djebel (1965); 2000 Guineas (1966)

Awards
- Timeform rating 125

Kashmir (1963 – 1981) was an Irish-bred, French-trained Thoroughbred racehorse and sire, best known for winning the classic 2000 Guineas in 1966. Kashmir was one of the leading French-trained two-year-olds of 1965 when he won the Prix Robert Papin and was placed in both the Prix Morny and the Prix de la Forêt. In the following spring he won the Prix Djebel and then defeated twenty-four opponents in the 2000 Guineas. He was beaten in his two subsequent races and was retired to stud where he had considerable success as a sire of winners. When racing in Britain, the horse was known as Kashmir II.

== Background ==
Kashmir was bred in Ireland by Jane Levins Moore. His coat colour was variously described as being either "black" "bay" or "brown". He was sired by Moore's stallion Tudor Melody, the top-rated British two-year-old of his generation, and later a successful sire. His other progeny included Magic Flute (Coronation Stakes), Welsh Pageant (Queen Elizabeth II Stakes) and Tudor Music (July Cup). Kashmir's dam Queen of Speed won two minor races and also produced Nick of Time, the dam of the Ascot Gold Cup winner Erimo Hawk.

As a yearling, Kashmir was sent to the sales at Newmarket where he was bought for 8,600 guineas by a representative of Peter Butler. The colt was sent into training with Mick Bartholomew in France.

== Racing career ==
=== 1965: two-year-old season ===
In the early part of 1965, Kashmir proved himself to be a fast and precocious colt, winning the Prix du Début over 800 metres at Saint-Cloud and the Prix de Martinvast over 1000 metres at Longchamp. In July, the colt was moved up in class to contest the prestigious Prix Robert Papin at Maisons-Laffitte Racecourse. Ridden by the British jockey Lester Piggott he won from Barbare, with Soleil in third. In the following month Kashmir finished third to Soleil in the Prix Morny at Deauville Racecourse and in September he was runner-up to Silver Shark in the Prix La Rochette. Silver Shark went on to defeat older sprinters in that year's Prix de l'Abbaye. On his final appearance of the season, Kashmir was also tried against older horses in the 1400 metre Prix de la Forêt at Longchamp and finished second to the five-year-old Red Slipper.

=== 1966: three-year-old season ===
Kashmir began his three-year-old season by winning the 1400 metre Prix Djebel at Maisons-Laffitte. He then raced outside France for the first and only time when he was sent to England to contest the 2000 Guineas over the Rowley Mile course at Newmarket on 27 April. He was ridden by the British jockey Jimmy Lindley and started at odds of 7/1 in a field of twenty-five runners. Two furlongs from the finish Lindley used Kashmir's acceleration to open up a three length lead, and although his opponents reduced the gap in the closing stages, he prevailed by a short-head from Great Nephew, with Celtic Song in third.

On his return to France, Kashmir finished third to Silver Shark and Barbare in the Prix Jean Prat at Longchamp in June. After finishing unplaced on his only subsequent appearance he was retired from racing.

== Assessment ==
The independent Timeform organisation awarded Kashmir a peak annual rating of 125. In their book A Century of Champions, based on a modified version of the Timeform system, John Randall and Tony Morris rated Kashmir an "inferior" winner of the 2000 Guineas.

== Stud record ==
Kashmir was retired to stud and became a successful breeding stallion. Among his best winners were Moulines (Poule d'Essai des Poulains), Dumka (Poule d'Essai des Pouliches, dam of Doyoun), Blue Cashmere (Nunthorpe Stakes), Kamicia (Prix Vermeille) and Lightning (Prix d'Ispahan). He died on 17 March 1981.

== Pedigree ==
Pedigree of Kashmir (IRE), dark bay or brown stallion, 1963
Sire Tudor Melody (GB) 1956	Tudor Minstrel (GB); 1944	Owen Tudor	Hyperion*
Sire Tudor Melody (GB) 1956	Tudor Minstrel (GB); 1944	Owen Tudor	Mary Tudor
Sire Tudor Melody (GB) 1956	Tudor Minstrel (GB); 1944	Sansonnet	Sansovino
Sire Tudor Melody (GB) 1956	Tudor Minstrel (GB); 1944	Sansonnet	Lady Juror*
Sire Tudor Melody (GB) 1956	Matelda (GB); 1947	Dante	Nearco
Sire Tudor Melody (GB) 1956	Matelda (GB); 1947	Dante	Rosy Legend
Sire Tudor Melody (GB) 1956	Matelda (GB); 1947	Fairly Hot	Solario
Sire Tudor Melody (GB) 1956	Matelda (GB); 1947	Fairly Hot	Fair Cop*
Dam Queen of Speed (GB) 1950	Blue Train (IRE); 1944	Blue Peter	Fairway*
Dam Queen of Speed (GB) 1950	Blue Train (IRE); 1944	Blue Peter	Fancy Free
Dam Queen of Speed (GB) 1950	Blue Train (IRE); 1944	Sun Chariot	Hyperion*
Dam Queen of Speed (GB) 1950	Blue Train (IRE); 1944	Sun Chariot	Clarence
Dam Queen of Speed (GB) 1950	Bishopscourt (GB); 1945	His Grace	Blandford
Dam Queen of Speed (GB) 1950	Bishopscourt (GB); 1945	His Grace	Malva
Dam Queen of Speed (GB) 1950	Bishopscourt (GB); 1945	Jurisdiction	Abbots Trace
Dam Queen of Speed (GB) 1950	Bishopscourt (GB); 1945	Jurisdiction	Lady Juror* (Family 9-c)

* Kashmir is inbred 4S x 4D to the stallion Hyperion, meaning that he appears fourth generation on the sire side of his pedigree, and fourth generation on the dam side of his pedigree.

* Kashmir is inbred 4S x 4D to the mare Lady Juror, meaning that she appears fourth generation on the sire side of his pedigree, and fourth generation on the dam side of his pedigree.

* Kashmir is inbred 5S x 4D to the stallion Fairway, meaning that he appears fifth generation (via Fair Cop) on the sire side of his pedigree, and fourth generarion on the dam side of his pedigree.
