= Sassafras (horse) =

French-bred Thoroughbred racehorse

- Sire: Sheshoon
- Grandsire: Precipitation
- Dam: Ruta
- Damsire: Ratification
- Sex: Stallion
- Foaled: 1967
- Colour: Bay
- Earnings: £249,540
- Last updated on 7 June 2023

Sassafras was a champion racehorse.

Sent initially to the Ballylinch Stud at Thomastown in County Kilkenny, Ireland, Sassafras was the sire of winners for over 72 races. Sassafras sired Galway Bay who was a stakes winner in Great Britain and Australia before becoming a sire of stakes winners.

The sire line for Sassafras, an extension of the Solon branch, which extends down through West Australian, back to Matchem, down to foundation sire Godolphin Arabian, was known to continue to exist as recently as 2009, but was known to be dwindling.

== Sire line tree ==
- Sassafras
  - Henri le Balafre
    - As de Pique
    - Quintus Ferus
    - Henry Junior
    - Ken Graf
    - Thignon Lafre
      - Roxinho
      - Thignon Boy
  - Galway Bay
