= Breeders' Cup Turf =

American Thoroughbred horse race

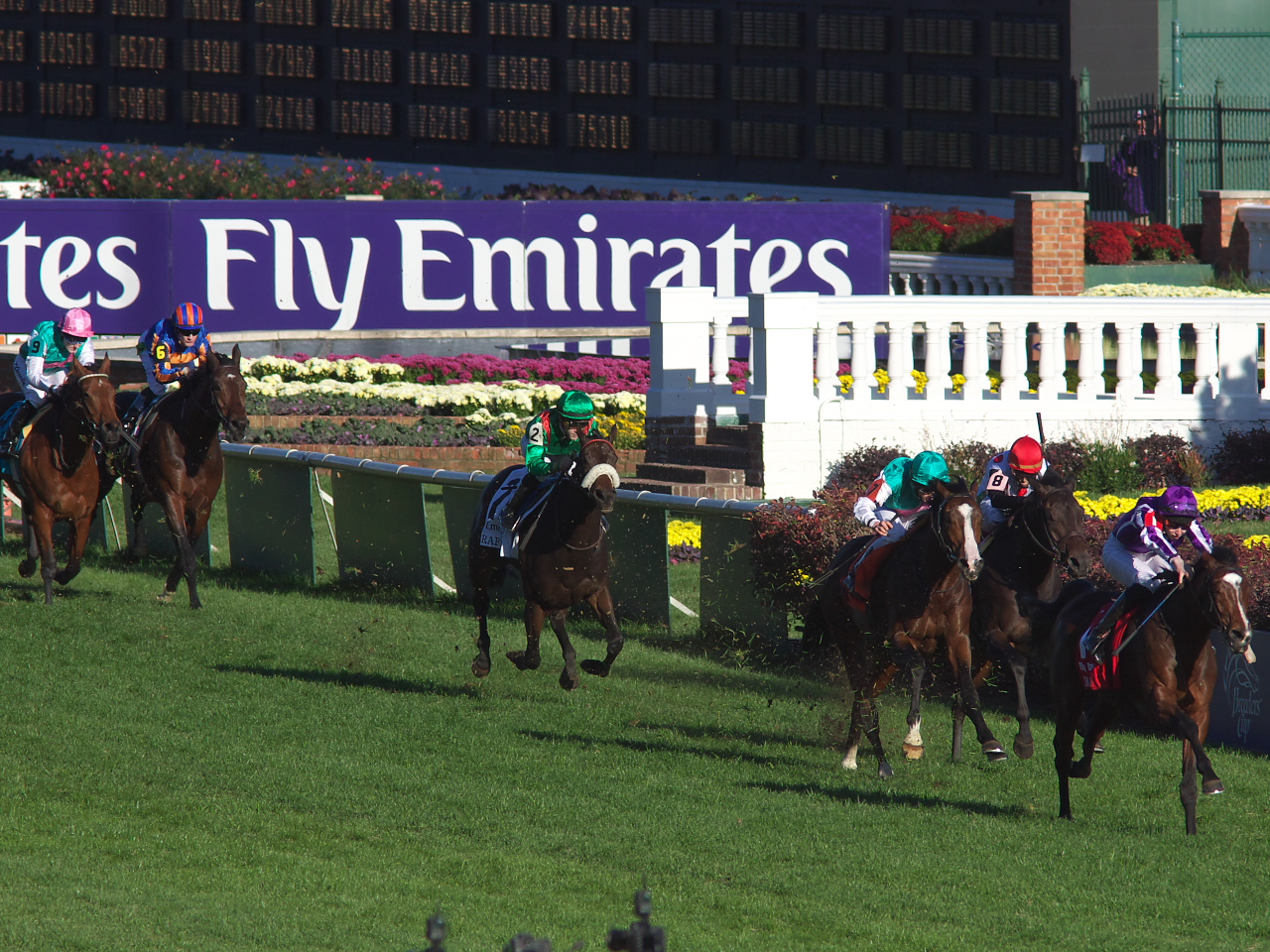
- The 2011 Breeders' Cup Turf
- Class: Grade I
- Location: North America
- Inaugurated: 1984
- Race type: Thoroughbred
- Website: Breeders' Cup Turf

Race information
- Distance: 1 1/2 miles
- Surface: Turf
- Track: Left-handed
- Qualification: 3-year-olds and up
- Weight: Weight-For-Age; 4-year-olds & up: 126 lb (57.2 kg); Northern Hemisphere 3-year-olds: 122 lb (55.3 kg); Southern Hemisphere 3-year-olds: 117 lb (53.1 kg)
- Purse: US$5 million (2024)

The Breeders' Cup Turf is a Weight for Age Thoroughbred horse race on turf for three-year-olds and up. It is held annually at a different racetrack in the United States or Canada as part of the Breeders' Cup World Championships. The race's current title sponsor is Longines.

The race is run at the European Classic distance of 1 1/2 miles, making it one of the most internationally appealing races on the Breeders' Cup lineup. One of the biggest moments in the race's history came in 2018 when Enable became the first horse to win both the Prix de l'Arc de Triomphe and Breeders' Cup Turf in the same year.

The forerunner for this race was the Washington, D.C. International Stakes at Laurel Park Racecourse. Inaugurated in 1952, it was raced on turf at 1 1/2 miles and drew the best horses from North America and Europe.

== Automatic berths ==
Beginning in 2007, the Breeders' Cup developed the Breeders' Cup Challenge, a series of races in each division that allotted automatic qualifying bids to winners of defined races. Each of the fourteen divisions has multiple qualifying races. Note though that one horse may win multiple challenge races, while other challenge winners will not be entered in the Breeders' Cup for a variety of reasons such as injury or travel considerations.

In the Turf division, runners are limited to 14 and there are up to 11 automatic berths. The 2022 "Win and You're In" races were:

1. the Gran Premio Internacional Carlos Pellegrini, a Grade 1 race run in December at Hipódromo de San Isidro in Argentina
2. the Grande Prêmio Brasil, a Grade 1 race run in June at Hipódromo da Gávea in Brazil
3. the Prince of Wales's Stakes, a Group I race run in June at Royal Ascot in England
4. the Takarazuka Kinen, a Grade 1 race run in June at Hanshin Racecourse in Japan
5. the King George VI & Queen Elizabeth Stakes, a Group 1 race run in July at Ascot Racecourse in England
6. the Del Mar Handicap, a Grade 2 race run in August at Del Mar Racetrack in California
7. the Sword Dancer, a Grade 1 race run in August at Saratoga Race Course in upstate New York
8. the Irish Champion Stakes, a Group 1 race run in September at Leopardstown Racecourse in Ireland
9. the Kentucky Turf Cup, a Grade 2 race run in September at Kentucky Downs in Kentucky
10. the Prix de l'Arc de Triomphe, a Group 1 race run in October at Longchamps in France
11. the Champion Stakes, a Group 1 race run in October at Ascot in England

== Records ==
Most wins:

- 2 – High Chaparral (2002, 2003)
- 2 – Conduit (2008, 2009)
- 2 – Rebel's Romance (2022, 2024)

Most wins by a jockey:

- 6 - Ryan Moore (2008, 2009, 2013, 2015, 2023, 2026)

Most wins by a trainer:

- 8 – Aidan O'Brien (2002, 2003, 2011, 2013, 2015, 2016, 2023, 2026)

Most wins by an owner:

- 8 – Sue Magnier, Michael Tabor & Derrick Smith (2002, 2003, 2011, 2013, 2015, 2016, 2023, 2026)

Widest winning margin:

- 7 lengths - English Channel (2007)

Fastest winning time:

- 2:22.83 - Little Mike (2012)

== Winners ==
Year	Winner	Age	Jockey	Trainer	Owner	Time	Purse	Gr.	Ref
2026	Benvenuto Cellini (IRE)	3	Ryan Moore	Aidan O'Brien	Peter M. Brant, Mrs. John Magnier, Michael B. Tabor, Derrick Smith & Westerberg	2:27.50	$5,000,000	I	
2025	Ethical Diamond (IRE)	5	Dylan Browne McMonagle	Willie Mullins	H O S Syndicate	2:25.45	$5,000,000	I	
2024	Rebel's Romance (IRE)	6	William Buick	Charlie Appleby	Godolphin	2:26.07	$5,000,000	I	
2023	Auguste Rodin (IRE)	3	Ryan Moore	Aidan O'Brien	Tabor / Smith / Magnier / Westerberg	2:24.30	$4,000,000	I	
2022	Rebel's Romance (IRE)	4	James Doyle	Charlie Appleby	Godolphin	2:26.35	$4,000,000	I	
2021	Yibir (GB)	3	William Buick	Charlie Appleby	Godolphin	2:25.90	$4,000,000	I	
2020	Tarnawa† (IRE)	4	Colin Keane	Dermot Weld	Aga Khan IV	2:28.02	$4,000,000	I	
2019	Bricks and Mortar	5	Irad Ortiz Jr.	Chad C. Brown	Klaravich Stables & William Lawrence	2:24.73	$4,000,000	I	
2018	Enable† (GB)	4	Frankie Dettori	John Gosden	Khalid ibn Abdullah	2:32.65	$4,000,000	I	
2017	Talismanic (GB)	4	Mickael Barzalona	André Fabre	Godolphin Stable Lessee	2:26.19	$4,000,000	I	
2016	Highland Reel (IRE)	4	Seamie Heffernan	Aidan O'Brien	Michael Tabor, Sue Magnier, Derrick Smith	2:23.00	$4,000,000	I	
2015	Found† (IRE)	3	Ryan Moore	Aidan O'Brien	Michael Tabor, Sue Magnier, Derrick Smith	2:32.06	$3,000,000	I	
2014	Main Sequence	5	John R. Velazquez	Graham Motion	Flaxman Holdings	2:24.91	$3,000,000	I	
2013	Magician (IRE)	3	Ryan Moore	Aidan O'Brien	Derrick Smith	2:23.23	$3,000,000	I	
2012	Little Mike	5	Ramon Domínguez	Dale Romans	Priscilla Vaccarezza	2:22.83	$3,000,000	I	
2011	St Nicholas Abbey (IRE)	4	Joseph O'Brien	Aidan O'Brien	Michael Tabor, Sue Magnier, Derrick Smith	2:28:85	$3,000,000	I	
2010	Dangerous Midge	4	Frankie Dettori	Brian J. Meehan	Iraj Parvizi	2:29.40	$3,000,000	I	
2009	Conduit (IRE)	4	Ryan Moore	Sir Michael Stoute	Ballymacoll Farm	2:23.75	$3,000,000	I	
2008	Conduit (IRE)	3	Ryan Moore	Sir Michael Stoute	Ballymacoll Farm	2:23.42	$3,000,000	I	
2007	English Channel	5	John R. Velazquez	Todd A. Pletcher	James T. Scatuorchio	2:36.96	$3,000,000	I	
2006	Red Rocks (IRE)	3	Frankie Dettori	Brian J. Meehan	J. Paul Reddam	2:27.32	$3,000,000	I	
2005	Shirocco (GER)	4	Christophe Soumillon	André Fabre	Baron Georg von Ullmann	2:29.20	$2,000,000	I	
2004	Better Talk Now	5	Ramon Domínguez	H. Graham Motion	Bushwood Stables	2:29.70	$2,000,000	I	
2003	High Chaparral (DH) (IRE)	4	Michael Kinane	Aidan O'Brien	Michael Tabor, Sue Magnier	2:24.24	$2,000,000	I	
2003	Johar (DH)	4	Alex Solis	Richard Mandella	The Thoroughbred Corp.	2:24.24	$2,000,000	I	
2002	High Chaparral (IRE)	3	Michael Kinane	Aidan O'Brien	Michael Tabor/Sue Magnier	2:30.14	$2,000,000	I	
2001	Fantastic Light	5	Frankie Dettori	Saeed bin Suroor	Godolphin Racing	2:24.20	$2,000,000	I	
2000	Kalanisi (IRE)	4	Johnny Murtagh	Sir Michael Stoute	HH Aga Khan IV	2:26.96	$2,000,000	I	
1999	Daylami (IRE)	5	Frankie Dettori	Saeed bin Suroor	HH Aga Khan IV/Godolphin	2:24.73	$2,000,000	I	
1998	Buck's Boy	5	Shane Sellers	P. Noel Hickey	Quarter B Farm (George Bunn)	2:28.74	$2,000,000	I	
1997	Chief Bearhart (CAN)	4	José A. Santos	Mark Frostad	Sam-Son Farm	2:23.92	$2,000,000	I	
1996	Pilsudski (IRE)	4	Walter Swinburn	Michael Stoute	Lord Weinstock	2:30.20	$2,000,000	I	
1995	Northern Spur (IRE)	4	Chris McCarron	Ron McAnally	Charles J. Cella	2:42.07	$2,000,000	I	
1994	Tikkanen	3	Mike E. Smith	Jonathan Pease	Augustin Stable	2:26.50	$2,000,000	I	
1993	Kotashaan (FR)	5	Kent Desormeaux	Richard Mandella	La Presle Farm	2:25.16	$2,000,000	I	
1992	Fraise	4	Pat Valenzuela	William I. Mott	Madeleine Paulson	2:24.08	$2,000,000	I	
1991	Miss Alleged†	4	Éric Legrix	Pascal Bary	Fares Farm	2:30.95	$2,000,000	I	
1990	In the Wings (GB)	4	Gary Stevens	André Fabre	Sheikh Mohammed	2:29.60	$2,000,000	I	
1989	Prized	3	Ed Delahoussaye	Neil Drysdale	Clover Racing/Meadowbrook	2:28.00	$2,000,000	I	
1988	Great Communicator	5	Ray Sibille	Thad Ackel	Class Act Farm (George Ackel)	2:35.20	$2,000,000	I	
1987	Theatrical (IRE)	5	Pat Day	William I. Mott	Allen E. Paulson	2:24.40	$2,000,000	I	
1986	Manila	3	José A. Santos	LeRoy Jolley	Bradley M. Shannon	2:25.40	$2,000,000	I	
1985	Pebbles† (GB)	4	Pat Eddery	Clive Brittain	Sheikh Mohammed	2:27.00	$2,000,000	I	
1984	Lashkari (GB)	3	Yves Saint-Martin	Alain de Royer-Dupré	HH Aga Khan IV	2:25.20	$2,000,000	I	

† Indicates filly/mare

== See also ==
- Breeders' Cup Turf "top three finishers" and starters
- Breeders' Cup World Thoroughbred Championships
- American thoroughbred racing top attended events
