= Kalanisi =

Irish-bred Thoroughbred racehorse (1996–2023)

- Sire: Doyoun
- Grandsire: Mill Reef
- Dam: Kalamba
- Damsire: Green Dancer
- Sex: Stallion
- Foaled: 27 March 1996
- Died: 25 May 2023 (aged 27)
- Country: Ireland
- Colour: Dark Bay/Brown
- Breeder: H.H. Aga Khan's Stud S.C.
- Owner: H.H. Aga Khan IV
- Trainer: Sir Michael Stoute
- Record: 11: 6-4-1
- Earnings: £1,369,605

Major wins
- Heron Stakes (1999); Queen Anne Stakes (2000); Champion Stakes (2000); Breeders' Cup Turf (2000)

Awards
- American Champion Male Turf Horse (2000); European Champion Older Horse (2000)
- Last updated on 2 August 2008

Kalanisi (27 March 1996 – 25 May 2023) was a Thoroughbred racehorse who won European Champion and American Champion honours in 2000.

== Background ==
Bred and raced by H.H. Aga Khan IV, Kalanisi was out of the mare Kalamba, a daughter of Green Dancer, a Champion sire in France who was a son of the English Triple Crown winner, Nijinsky. Kalanisi was sired by Doyoun, winner of the 1988 British Classic Race, the 2,000 Guineas Stakes. Doyoun was a son of Mill Reef whose multiple Group One wins included The Derby and Prix de l'Arc de Triomphe and who was voted 1971's European Horse of the Year.

== Racing career ==
=== 1999: three-year-old season ===
Trained by Sir Michael Stoute, Kalanisi won all three starts as a three-year-old.

=== 2000: four-year-old season ===
Then at age four, he won the then Group 2 Queen Anne Stakes and the Group 1 Champion Stakes in England and earned a second in two other Group 1 races. Shipped to the United States for the 4 November 2000 Grade 1 Breeders' Cup Turf at Churchill Downs, under jockey Johnny Murtagh, Kalanisi won the race by defeating runner-up Quiet Resolve as well as the betting favourite Montjeu and other top international runners such as Fantastic Light, and Manndar. It was the Aga Khan's second win of the Breeders' Cup Turf as an owner, having won with Lashkari in 1984's inaugural running.

=== 2001: five-year-old season ===
Racing at age five, Kalanisi made two starts and notably was second in June's Group 1 Prince of Wales's Stakes at England's Ascot Racecourse. Injured in the race, he was retired to stud duty at his owner's Gilltown Stud in County Kildare, Ireland.

== Assessment ==
Kalanasi's performances in 2000 earned him the American Eclipse Award as U.S. Champion Male Turf Horse and the Cartier Racing Award as European Champion Older Horse.

== Stud career ==
Kalanisi was the sire of more than one hundred and forty foals of which, as of mid-2008, thirty-five have been race winners. Beginning in 2008 he was standing at Boardsmill Stud in County Meath. He was withdrawn from stud duty in 2020 "due to fertility issues".

== Death ==
Kalanisi died suddenly in his paddock on 25 May 2023, at the age of 27. The news was announced on 26 May, a few days after Kalanisi's death.

== Commemoration ==
The 'Kalanisi Building' at the Royal Veterinary College, Hatfield, England, was named in Kalanisi's honour on 4 August 2010.
