= Black-Eyed Susan Stakes top three finishers =

Horse race held at Pimlico Race Course

This is a listing of the horses that finished in either first, second, or third place and the number of starters in the George E. Mitchell Stakes, the second leg of the de facto American Triple Tiara of Thoroughbred Racing. The Black-Eyed Susan Stakes is run at 1-1/8 miles over dirt for three-year-old fillies at Pimlico Race Course in Baltimore, Maryland.

| Year | Winner | Second | Third | Starters |
|---|---|---|---|---|
| 2026 | My Miss Mo | Jumping the Gun | A. P.’s Girl | 9 |
| 2025 | Margie’s Intention | Paris Lily | Kinzie Queen | 9 |
| 2024 | Gun Song | Corposo | Call Another Play | 8 |
| 2023 | Taxed | Hoosier Philly | Faiza | 9 |
| 2022 | Interstatedaydream | Adare Manor | Radio Days | 13 |
| 2021 | Army Wife | Willful Woman | Lady Traveler | 10 |
| 2020 | Miss Marissa | Bonny South | Hopeful Growth | 11 |
| 2019 | Point of Honor | Ulele | Cookie Dough | 8 |
| 2018 | Red Ruby | Coach Rocks | Indy Union | 10 |
| 2017 | Actress | Lights of Medina | Corporate Queen | 11 |
| 2016 | Go Maggie Go | Ma Can Do It | Kinsley Kisses | 14 |
| 2015 | Keen Pauline | Include Betty | Ahh Chocolate | 9 |
| 2014 | Stopchargingmaria | Vero Amore | Fortune Pearl | 11 |
| 2013 | Fiftyshadesofhay | Marathon Lady | Toasting | 9 |
| 2012 | In Lingerie | Disposablepleasure | Wildcat's Smile | 9 |
| 2011 | Royal Delta** | Buster's Ready | Hot Summer | 6 |
| 2010 | Acting Happy | No Such Word | Tidal Pool | 9 |
| 2009 | Payton D' Oro | Bon Jovi Girl | Casanova Move | 7 |
| 2008 | Sweet Vendetta | She's All Eltish | Seattle Smooth | 9 |
| 2007 | Panty Raid | Winning Point | Baroness Thatcher | 8 |
| 2006 | Regal Engagement | Smart N Pretty | Baghdaria | 7 |
| 2005 | Spun Sugar | R Lady Joy | Pleasant Chimes | 6 |
| 2004 | Yearly Report | Pawyne Princess | Rare Gift | 7 |
| 2003 | Roar Emotion | Fircroft | Santa Catarina | 8 |
| 2002 | Chamrousse | Shop Til You Drop | Autumn Creek | 6 |
| 2001 | Two Item Limit | Indy Glory | Tap Dance | 5 |
| 2000 | Jostle | March Magic | Impending Bear | 7 |
| 1999 | Silverbulletday** | Dreams Gallore | Vee Vee Star | 7 |
| 1998 | Added Gold | Tappin Ginger | Hansel's Girl | 8 |
| 1997 | Salt It | Buckeye Search | Holiday Ball | 7 |
| 1996 | Mesabi Maiden | Cara Rafaela | Ginny Lynn | 8 |
| 1995 | Serena's Song** | Conquistadoress | Rare Opportunity | 7 |
| 1994 | Calipha | Bunting | Golden Braids | 13 |
| 1993 | Aztec Hill | Traverse City | Jacody | 10 |
| 1992 | Miss Legality | Known Feminist | Diamond Duo | 8 |
| 1991 | Wide Country** | John's Decision | Nalees Pin | 9 |
| 1990 | Charon | Valay Maid | Bright Candles | 9 |
| 1989 | Imaginary Lady | Some Romance | Moonlight Martini | 9 |
| 1988 | Costly Shoes | Thirty Eight Go Go | Lost Kitty | 6 |
| 1987 | Grecian Flight | Bal du Bois | Actic Cloud | 10 |
| 1986 | Family Style | Steel Maiden | Fingil's Jule | 8 |
| 1985 | Kulucyoo's Jill | Denver Express | A Joyfull Spray | 7 |
| 1984 | Lucky Lucky Lucky | Sintra | Duo Disco | 7 |
| 1983 | Batna | Lovin Touch | Weekend Surprise | 10 |
| 1982 | Delicate Ice | Trove | Millingo | 10 |
| 1981 | Dame Mysterieuse | Wayward Lass | Real | 7 |
| 1980 | Weber City Miss | Bishop's Ring | Champagne Star | 8 |
| 1979 | Davona Dale** | Phoebe's Donkey | Plankton | 6 |
| 1978 | Caesar's Wish | Javalin | Miss Baja | 8 |
| 1977 | Small Raja | Northern Sea | Enthused | 5 |
| 1976 | What A Summer | Dearly Precious | Artfully | 10 |
| 1975 | My Juliet | Gala Lil | Funalon | 6 |
| 1974 | Blowing Rock | Heydairya | Shantung Silk | 8 |
| 1973 | Fish Wife | Guided Missile | Out Cold | 6 |
| 1972 | Summer Guest | Twixt | Barely Even | 9 |
| 1971 | At Arms Length | Movetta | Sew To Bed | 8 |
| 1970 | Office Queen** | Princess Roycroft | Artists Proof | 6 |
| 1969 | Process Shot | Loyal Ruler | Around the Horn | n/a |
| 1968 | Singing Rain | Syrian Sea | Copper Canyon | n/a |
| 1967 | Farest Nan | Back In Paris | Devotedly | n/a |
| 1966 | Holly-O | Chalina | Justakiss | n/a |
| 1965 | Sue Baru | Wendy's Crown | Cavans Rose | n/a |
| 1964 | Bold Queen | Sceree | Sabermar | n/a |
| 1963 | Nalee | Medici | Bateur | n/a |
| 1962 | Batter Up | Narola | Spooky Creature | n/a |
| 1961 | Funloving | My Portrait | First Sitting | n/a |
| 1960 | Airmans Guide** | Chalvedele | Warlike | n/a |
| 1959 | Toluene | Cervina | San Ju Lee | n/a |
| 1958 | Daumay | Motivate | Stay Smoochie | n/a |
| 1957 | Pillow Talk | Jota Jota | Woodlawn | n/a |
| 1956 | Princess Turia | Beyond | Hadareward | n/a |
| 1955 | High Voltage | Bless Pat | Hen Party | n/a |
| 1954 | Queen Hopeful | Gwenty G. | Walla | n/a |
| 1953 | Spinning Top | Milspal | Wings o' Morn | n/a |
| 1952 | Real Delight** | Dinewisely | Parading Lady | n/a |
| 1951 | Discreet | Break of Day | Strike | n/a |
| 1950 | No Race | No Race | No Race | 0 |
| 1949 | Wistful** | Imacomin | Admired | n/a |
| 1948 | Scattered | Itsabet | Lea Lark | n/a |
| 1947 | But Why Not** | Cosmic Missile | Oberod | n/a |
| 1946 | Red Shoes | Ear Shot | Dorothy Brown | n/a |
| 1945 | Gallorette** | Recce | Be Faithful | n/a |
| 1944 | Twilight Tear** | Plucky Maud | Everget | n/a |
| 1943 | Askmenow | Too Timely | Pomrose | n/a |
| 1942 | Vagrancy** | Chiquita Mia | Bonnet Ann | n/a |
| 1941 | Cis Marion | Dark Discovery | Level Best | n/a |
| 1940 | Fairy Chant** | True Call | Discerning | n/a |
| 1939 | Alms | Otra | Morstep | n/a |
| 1938 | Sketchbook | Autumnquest | Anaflame | n/a |
| 1937 | Sweet Desire | Lucky Pledge | Morning | n/a |
| 1936 | No Race | No Race | No Race | 0 |
| 1935 | No Race | No Race | No Race | 0 |
| 1934 | No Race | No Race | No Race | 0 |
| 1933 | No Race | No Race | No Race | 0 |
| 1932 | No Race | No Race | No Race | 0 |
| 1931 | Dark Magnet | Scuttle | Anne Arundel | n/a |
| 1930 | Flimsy | Her Grace | Snowflake | n/a |
| 1929 | Altitude | Aquastella | March Hare | n/a |
| 1928 | Princess Tina | Nixie | Bateau | n/a |
| 1927 | Pandera | Fair Star | Signota | n/a |
| 1926 | Rapture | Ingrid | Black Maria | n/a |
| 1925 | Maid at Arms** | Revoke | Primrose | 8 |
| 1924 | Nellie Morse** | Relentless | Yankee Princess | n/a |
| 1923 | Gadfly | Untidy | Transom | n/a |
| 1922 | Dinahmeur | Maryland Belle | May Blossum | n/a |
| 1921 | Careful | Polly Ann | Joan Marie | n/a |
| 1920 | Cleopatra** | Arethusa | Rubidium | n/a |
| 1919 | Milkmaid** | Ophelia | Duchess Lace | n/a |

The 18 fillies whose name have ** next to them were named either (16) American Champion Three-Year-Old Filly or
(8) American Champion Older Female Horse and in (6) cases they were named Champion in both divisions.
