= 2005 Black-Eyed Susan Stakes =

Horse race held at Pimlico Race Course

81st Black-Eyed Susan Stakes
- Black-Eyed Susan Stakes
- Location: Pimlico Race Course, Baltimore, Maryland, United States
- Date: May 20, 2005
- Winning horse: Spun Sugar
- Jockey: John Velazquez
- Conditions: Fast
- Surface: Dirt

The 2005 Black-Eyed Susan Stakes was the 81st running of the Black-Eyed Susan Stakes. The race took place on May 20, 2005, and was televised in the United States on the Bravo TV network owned by NBC. Ridden by jockey John Velazquez, Spun Sugar, won the race by three and three quarter lengths over runner-up R Lady Joy. Approximate post time on the evening before the Preakness Stakes was 5:14 p.m. Eastern Time and the race was run for a purse of $200,000. The race was run over a fast track in a final time of 1:53.27. The Maryland Jockey Club reported total attendance of 23,994.

== Payout ==
The 81st Black-Eyed Susan Stakes Payout Schedule

Program Number	Horse Name	Win	Place	Show
6	Spun Sugar	US$4.40	$3.00	$2.80
5	R Lady Joy	-	$4.60	$3.40
1	Pleasant Chimes	-	-	$3.80

$2 Exacta: (6–5) paid $17.60

$2 Trifecta: (6–5–1) paid $78.40

$1 Superfecta: (6–5–1–2) paid $80.80

== The full chart ==
Finish Position	Lengths Behind	Post Position	Horse name	Trainer	Jockey	Owner	Post Time Odds	Purse Earnings
1st	0	6	Spun Sugar	Todd A. Pletcher	John Velazquez	Adena Springs	1.20-1 favorite	$120,000
2nd	33/4	5	R Lady Joy	Kirk Ziadie	Cornelio Velásquez	Richard N. Averill	4.50-1	$40,000
3rd	63/4	1	Pleasant Chimes		Eibar Coa	Edward P. Evans	7.00-1	$20,000
4th	203/4	2	Runway Model	Bernard S. Flint	Gary Stevens	Naveed Chowhan	3.00-1	$12,000
5th	221/2	4	Merrill Gold		Edgar Prado	Sally Anderson	17.00-1	$6,000
6th	243/4	3	Private Gift		Jerry Bailey	Mt. Brilliant Farm	8.00-1	

- Winning Breeder: Adena Springs; (KY)
- Final Time: 1:53.27
- Track Condition: Sloppy
- Total Attendance: 23,994

== See also ==
- 2005 Preakness Stakes
- Black-Eyed Susan Stakes Stakes "top three finishers" and # of starters
