= 2012 Black-Eyed Susan Stakes =

Horse race held at Pimlico Race Course

88th Black-Eyed Susan Stakes
- Black-Eyed Susan Stakes
- Location: Pimlico Race Course, Baltimore, Maryland, United States
- Date: May 18, 2012
- Winning horse: In Lingerie
- Jockey: John R. Velazquez
- Conditions: Fast
- Surface: Dirt

The 2012 Black-Eyed Susan Stakes was the 88th running of the Black-Eyed Susan Stakes. The race took place in Baltimore, Maryland on May 18, 2012, and was televised in the United States on the NBC Sports Network. Ridden by jockey John R. Velazquez, In Lingerie won the race by one and one quarter lengths over runner-up Disposablepleasure. Approximate post time on the Friday evening before the Preakness Stakes was 4:46 p.m. Eastern Time and the race was run for a purse of $300,000. The race was run over a fast track in a final time of 1:52.07. The Maryland Jockey Club reported total attendance of 32,473. The attendance at Pimlico Race Course that day was a record crowd for Black-Eyed Susan Stakes Day.

== Payout ==
The 88th Black-Eyed Susan Stakes Payout Schedule

Program Number	Horse Name	Win	Place	Show
7	In Lingerie	$9.80	$5.00	$4.80
2	Disposablepleasure	-	$7.20	$6.00
8	Wildcat's Smile	-	-	$8.60

$2 Exacta: (7–2) paid $61.80

$2 Trifecta: (7–2–8) paid $423.80

$1 Superfecta: (7–2–8–6) paid $601.20

== The full chart ==
Finish Position	Lengths Behind	Post Position	Horse name	Trainer	Jockey	Owner	Post Time Odds	Purse Earnings
1st	0	7	In Lingerie	Todd A. Pletcher	John R. Velazquez	Eclipse Thoroughbred	3.90-1	$180,000
2nd	11/4	2	Disposablepleasure	Todd A. Pletcher	Javier Castellano	Glencrest Farm LLC	9.00-1	$60,000
3rd	3	8	Wildcat's Smile	Dominic Galluscio	Rosie Napravnik	Francis J. Paolangeli	11.00-1	$30,000
4th	71/2	4	Mamma Kimbo	Bob Baffert	Mike E. Smith	Peachtree Stable	1.00-1 favorite	$18,000
5th	121/4	1	Glinda the Good	Steve Asmussen	Corey Nakatani	Stonestreet Stables	23.90-1	$9,000
6th	163/4	3	Welcome Guest	Chad Brown	Ramon Dominguez	A. G. S. Thoroughbreds	2.90-1	$3,000
7th	171/4	9	Zucchini Flower	H. Graham Motion	Sheldon Russell	Albert Frassetto	60.90-1	
8th	19	6	Plum	Rodney Jenkins	Abel Castellano, Jr.	Dark Hollow Farm	51.20-1	
9th	511/2	5	Oaks Lily	Timothy A. Hills	Julien Leparoux	Rey, Sarmiento & Zanelli	42.30-1	

- Winning Breeder: Colts Neck Stables; (KY)
- Final Time: 1:52.07
- Track Condition: Fast
- Total Attendance: 32,473

== See also ==
- 2012 Preakness Stakes
- Black-Eyed Susan Stakes Stakes "top three finishers" and # of starters
