= 2013 Road to the Kentucky Oaks =

The 2013 Road to the Kentucky Oaks was a points system by which three-year-old fillies qualified for the 2013 Kentucky Oaks. The point system replaced a previous qualifying system which was based on graded stakes earnings. Beholder was the leading qualifier for the 2013 Oaks and finished second in the race to Princess of Sylmar.

== Description ==
The 2013 Road to the Kentucky Oaks points system was used to determine which three-year-old fillies qualified for the 2013 Kentucky Oaks. It consisted of 35 races: 20 races for the Kentucky Oaks Prep Season and 15 races for the Kentucky Oaks Championship Season. The point system replaced a previous Road to the Kentucky Oaks qualifying system based on graded stakes earnings.

== Standings ==
Beholder was the leading qualifier for the 2013 Oaks, having earned a total of 164 points by winning the Breeders' Cup Juvenile (10 points), Las Virgenes (50 points) and Santa Anita Oaks (100 points), plus a 2nd-place finish in the Santa Ynez (4 points). She would finish second in the Kentucky Oaks race to Princess of Sylmar, who qualified with 50 points.

2013 point standings
Rank	Horse	Owner	Trainer	Points	Earnings	References
1	Beholder	Spendthrift Farm	Richard Mandella	164	$1,500,000	
2	Rose to Gold	Kathleen Amaya and Raffaele Centrofanti	Sal Santoro	164	$717,889	
3	Unlimited Budget	Repole Stable	Todd Pletcher	160	$570,000	
4	Dreaming of Julia	Stonestreet Stables	Todd Pletcher	132	$719,000	
5	Close Hatches	Juddmonte Farms	Bill Mott	100	$150,000	
6	Flashy Gray	West Point Thoroughbreds and Tom Keithley	Bill Mott	60	$130,000	
**7**	**Princess of Sylmar**	**King of Prussia Stable**	**Todd Pletcher**	**50**	**$170,000**	
8	Fiftyshadesofhay	Karl Watson, Mike Pegram and Paul Weitman	Bob Baffert	50	$146,250	
9	Midnight Lucky	Karl Watson, Mike Pegram and Paul Weitman	Bob Baffert	50	$120,000	
10	Silsita	Eclipse Thoroughbred Partners and Tanourin Stable	Todd Pletcher	50	$57,660	
11	Seaneen Girl	Rolph A. Davis and Robert P. Tiller	Bernie Flint	34	$193,621	
12	Pure Fun	Magdalena Racing (Susan McPeek)	Ken McPeek	20	$269,800	
13	Walkwithapurpose	Sagamore Farm	Ignacio Correas IV	20	$190,000	
14	Unusual Way	Edward J. Brown Jr. and Philip Lebherz	Jeffrey L. Bonde	20	$149,050	
15	Cue the Moon	Spendthrift Farm	H. James Bond	20	$60,000	
16	Highestmaintenance	Repole Stable	Todd Pletcher	20	$20,000	
17	Scarlet Strike	Carver / Hollendorfer / Smith	Jerry Hollendorfer	18	$180,100	
18	Liberty Girl	Casner Racing	Eoin Harty	15	$29,750	
19	Touch Magic	Monsan Racing Partnership	Patrick Devereux Jr.	14	$183,000	
20	Broken Spell	Bluegrass Hall	D. Wayne Lukas	11	$117,976	
Qualifiers for Kentucky Oaks in pink; Winner of Kentucky Oaks in **bold**

== Qualifying race details ==
Race Details
Race	1st	2nd	3rd	4th
Shadwell Fillies' Mile	Certify (10)	Roz (4)	Amazona (2)	Masarah (1)
Chandelier	Executiveprivilege (10)	Scarlet Strike (4)	Miss Empire (2)	Majestic Minister (1)
Darley Alcibiades	Spring in the Air (10)	Broken Spell (4)	Magical Moon (2)	Tara from the Cape (1)
Frizette	Dreaming of Julia (10)	My Happy Face (4)	Toasting (2)	Nancy O (1)
Mazarine	Spring Venture (10)	Seaneen Girl (4)	Every Way (2)	Shenandoah Lady (1)
Pocahontas	Sign (10)	Gal About Town (4)	Cloudy Vow (2)	Cloudy in Sandiego (1)
Grey Goose Breeders' Cup Juvenile Fillies	Beholder (10)	Executiveprivilege (4)	Dreaming of Julia (2)	Kauai Katie (1)
Delta Downs Princess	Rose to Gold (10)	Touch Magic (4)	Sittin At the Bar (2)	Madame Cactus (1)
Demoiselle	Unlimited Budget (10)	Emmolient (4)	Giant Cats Eye (2)	Flash Forward (1)
Golden Rod	Seaneen Girl (10)	Gal About Town (4)	Liberated (2)	Cloudy Vow (1)
Hollywood Starlet	Pure Fun (10)	Blonde Fog (4)	Scarlet Strike (2)	Executiveprivilege (1)
Old Hat	Kauai Katie (10)	Cor Cor (4)	Power Lady (2)	Cupid's Messenger (1)
Bushanda	Princess of Sylmar (10)	Asiya (4)	Ruby Lips (2)	Coconut Shrimp (1)
Silverbulletday	Unlimited Budget(10)	Promise Me More(4)	Blue Violet(2)	Every Way(1)
Santa Ynez	Renee's Titan(10)	Beholder(4)	Dawn's Charm(2)	Switch to the Lead(1)
Santa Ysabel	Fiftyshadesofhay(10)	Heir Kitty(4)	Scarlet Strike(2)	Switch to the Lead(1)
Forward Gal	Kauai Katie(10)	My Happy Face(4)	Pow Wow Wow(2)	Fusaichiswonderful(1)
UAE 1,000 Guineas	Lovely Pass(10)	Shuruq(4)	Music Chart(2)	(1)
Martha Washington	Sister Ginger(10)	Rose to Gold(4)	Broken Spell(2)	American Sugar(1)
California Oaks	Redressthebalance(10)	Marks Mine(4)	Sweet Tess(2)	Macha(1)
Davona Dale	Live Lively(50)	Dreaming of Julia(20)	Private Ensign(10)	Lady Banks(5)
Rachel Alexandra	Unlimited Budget(50)	Promise Me More(20)	Blue Violet(10)	Every Way(5)
UAE Oaks	Shuruq(50)	Lovely Pass(20)	Music Chart(10)	(5)
Las Virgenes	Beholder(50)	Fiftyshadesofhay(20)	Scarlet Strike(10)	Heir Kitty(5)
Honeybee	Rose to Gold(50)	Flashy Gray(20)	American Sugar(10)	Liberty Girl(5)
Cicada	Elghayoor(50)	Highestmaintenance(20)	I'm Mom's Favorite(10)	Railtown Girl(5)
Bourbonette Oaks	Silsita(50)	Marathon Lady(20)	Pure Fun(10)	Broken Spell(5)
Sunland Park Oaks	Midnight Lucky(50)	Unusual Way(20)	Countess Curlin(10)	Infinitely(5)
Fair Grounds Oaks	Unlimited Budget(100)	Flashy Gray(40)	Seaneen Girl(20)	Promise Me More(10)
Gulfstream Park Oaks	Dreaming of Julia(100)	Live Lively(40)	Cue the Moon(20)	Kimberly Jean(10)
Ashland	Emollient (100)	Tuttipaesi(40)	Kitten's Point(20)	Wave Theory(10)
Santa Anita Oaks	Beholder(100)	Iotapa(40)	Fiftyshadesofhay(20)	Spellbound(10)
Gazelle	Close Hatches(100)	Princess of Sylmar(40)	Walkwithapurpose(20)	Watugonnadorosie(10)
Fantasy	Rose to Gold(100)	Manuka Honey(40)	Marathon Lady(20)	Liberty Girl(10)
Beaumont	Ciao Bella Luna(20)	Magical Moon(8)	Judy in Disguise(4)	Fearless Jacq(2)
Points earned for finish in race in parentheses; Source: Churchill Downs
