= 2007 Black-Eyed Susan Stakes =

Horse race held at Pimlico Race Course

83rd Black-Eyed Susan Stakes
- Black-Eyed Susan Stakes
- Location: Pimlico Race Course, Baltimore, Maryland, United States
- Date: May 18, 2007
- Winning horse: Panty Raid
- Jockey: Edgar Prado
- Conditions: Fast
- Surface: Dirt

The 2007 Black-Eyed Susan Stakes was the 83rd running of the Black-Eyed Susan Stakes. The race took place in Baltimore, Maryland on May 18, 2007, and was televised in the United States on the Bravo TV network owned by NBC. Ridden by jockey Edgar Prado, Panty Raid, won the race by one and one half lengths over runner-up Winning Point. Approximate post time on the evening before the Preakness Stakes was 5:50 p.m. Eastern Time and the race was run for a purse of $250,000. The race was run over a fast track in a final time of 1:50.07. The Maryland Jockey Club reported total attendance of 25,167. The attendance at Pimlico Race Course that day was a record crowd for Black-Eyed Susan Stakes Day.

== Payout ==
The 83rd Black-Eyed Susan Stakes Payout Schedule

Program Number	Horse Name	Win	Place	Show
2	Panty Raid	$6.80	$3.40	$2.60
1	Winning Point	-	$4.00	$2.80
3	Baroness Thatcher	-	-	$2.60

$2 Exacta: (2–1) paid $24.00

$2 Trifecta: (2–1–3) paid $58.00

$1 Superfecta: (2–1–3–5) paid $138.30

== The full chart ==
Finish Position	Lengths Behind	Post Position	Horse name	Jockey	Trainer	Owner	Post Time Odds	Purse Earnings
1st	0	2	Panty Raid	Edgar Prado	Todd A. Pletcher	Glencrest Farm	2.40-1	$150,000
2nd	1	1	Winning Point	Luis Garcia	Edmund Gaudet	Team Valor	3.00-1	$50,000
3rd	11/4	3	Baroness Thatcher	Garrett Gomez	Patrick Biancone	Zayat Stables	1.70-1 favorite	$30,000
4th	91/4	4	Moon Catcher	Carlos H. Marquez	Timothy F. Ritchey	CJZ Racing Stable	14.70-1	$15,000
5th	91/2	7	Fibbalator	Kendrick Carmouche	Robert Reid Jr.	B. P. Reid Stable	28.60-1	$7,500
6th	103/4	4	Enchanting Star	Joseph Rocco	Jennifer Bramblet	Michael J. Waller	16.70-1	
7th	181/2	6	Grace Happens	Mark Guidry	D. Wayne Lukas	Briland Farm	19.50-1	
8th	211/2	8	Fee Fi Fo Fum	Javier Castellano	James Jerkins	Susan & John Moore	7.00-1	

- Winning Breeder: Heaven Tree Farm; (KY)
- Final Time: 1:50.07
- Track Condition: Fast
- Total Attendance: 25,167

== See also ==
- 2007 Preakness Stakes
- Black-Eyed Susan Stakes Stakes "top three finishers" and # of starters
