= 2013 Black-Eyed Susan Stakes =

Horse race held at Pimlico Race Course

89th Black-Eyed Susan Stakes
- Black-Eyed Susan Stakes
- Location: Pimlico Race Course, Baltimore, Maryland, United States
- Date: May 17, 2013
- Winning horse: Fiftyshadesofhay
- Jockey: Joel Rosario
- Conditions: Fast
- Surface: Dirt

The 2013 Black-Eyed Susan Stakes was the 89th running of the Black-Eyed Susan Stakes. The race took place on May 17, 2013, and was televised in the United States on the NBC Sports Network. Ridden by jockey Joel Rosario, Fiftyshadesofhay won the race by a scant neck over runner-up Marathon Lady. Approximate post time on the Friday evening before the Preakness Stakes was 4:47 p.m. Eastern Time. The Maryland Jockey Club raised the purse to $500,000 for the 89th running. This made The Black-Eyed-Susan Stakes the third highest payout for a race restricted to three-year-old fillies. The race was run over a fast track in a final time of 1:52.73. The Maryland Jockey Club reported total attendance of 39,957. The attendance at Pimlico Race Course that day was a record crowd for Black-Eyed Susan Stakes Day.

== Payout ==
The 89th Black-Eyed Susan Stakes Payout Schedule

Program Number	Horse Name	Win	Place	Show
3	Fiftyshadesofhay	$6.60	$3.80	$3.00
9	Marathon Lady	-	$8.40	$4.80
8	Toasting	-	-	$5.40

$2 Exacta: (3–9) paid $54.00

$2 Trifecta: (3–9–8) paid $333.40

$1 Superfecta: (3–9–8–6) paid $532.30

== The full chart ==
Finish Position	Lengths Behind	Post Position	Horse name	Trainer	Jockey	Owner	Post Time Odds	Purse Earnings
1st	0	2	Fiftyshadesofhay	Bob Baffert	Joel Rosario	Mike Pegram & Karl Watson	2.30-1	$300,000
2nd	neck	7	Marathon Lady	Steve Hobby	Robby Albarado	Alex & Joanne Leiblong	12.20-1	$100,000
3rd	43/4	6	Toasting	Thomas Albertrani	Javier Castellano	West Point Thoroughbreds	19.10-1	$50,000
4th	12	6	Maracuya	Ralph E. Nicks	John R. Velazquez	T. C. Stable	3.60-1	$30,000
5th	131/2	3	Petit Trianon	Juan C. Vazquez	Victor R. Carrasco	Blue Top Holdings	33.80-1	$15,000
6th	211/2	5	Emollient	Bill Mott	Mike E. Smith	Juddmonte Farms	0.80-1 favorite	$5,000
7th	34	1	Lady Banks	James Lawrence	Julian Pimentel	George & Stephanie Autry	57.80-1	
8th	dnf	5	Walkwithapurpose	Ignacio Correas IV	Jose Lezcano	Sagamore Farm	5.00-1	scratch
9th	dnf	1	Manuka Honey	John Terranova	Edgar Prado	Curragh Stables	10.00-1	scratch

- Winning Breeder: WinStar Farm; (KY)
- Final Time: 1:52.73
- Track Condition: Fast
- Total Attendance: 39,957

== See also ==
- 2013 Preakness Stakes
- Black-Eyed Susan Stakes Stakes "top three finishers" and # of starters
