= 2018 Black-Eyed Susan Stakes =

Former 94th running of the Black-Eyed Susan

94th Black-Eyed Susan Stakes
- Black-Eyed Susan Stakes
- Location: Pimlico Race Course, Baltimore, Maryland, United States
- Date: May 18, 2018
- Winning horse: Red Ruby
- Jockey: Paco Lopez
- Conditions: Sloppy (Sealed)
- Surface: Dirt

The 2018 Black-Eyed Susan Stakes was the 94th running of the Black-Eyed Susan Stakes. The race took place on May 18, 2018, and was televised in the United States on the NBC Sports Network (NBCSN). Ridden by jockey Paco Lopez, Red Ruby won the race by four and three quarter lengths over runner-up Coach Rocks. Approximate post time on the Friday evening before the Preakness Stakes was 4:51 p.m. Eastern Time. The Maryland Jockey Club supplied a purse of $250,000 for the 94th running. The race was run over a sloppy (sealed) track in a final time of 1:50.17. The Maryland Jockey Club reported a Black-Eyed Susan Stakes Day attendance of 48,265. The attendance at Pimlico Race Course that day was the second best crowd ever for Black-Eyed Susan Stakes Day and the seventh largest for a thoroughbred race in North America in 2018.

== Payout ==
The 94th Black-Eyed Susan Stakes Payout Schedule

Program Number	Horse Name	Win	Place	Show
4	Red Ruby	$7.80	$4.00	$3.20
3	Coach Rocks	-	$4.20	$3.20
8	Indy Union	-	-	$4.60

$2 Exacta: (4–3) paid $ 30.60

$2 Trifecta: (4–3–8) paid $ 255.80

$1 Superfecta: (4–3–8-9) paid $ 475.30

== The full chart ==
Finish Position	Lengths Behind	Post Position	Horse name	Trainer	Jockey	Owner	Post Time Odds	Purse Earnings
1st	0	4	Red Ruby	Kellyn Gorder	Paco Lopez	Sandra Sexton	2.90-1	$150,000
2nd	4-3/4	3	Coach Rocks	Dale Romans	Luis Saez	West Point Thoroughbreds	3.00-1	$50,000
3rd	9-3/4	8	Indy Union	Jeremiah Englehart	Jose Ortiz	Robert Hahn	11.60-1	$25,000
4th	14-1/2	9	Sara Street	Kiaran McGlaughlin	Dylan Davis	Westrock Stables LLC	2.80-1 favorite	$15,000
5th	14-3/4	7	Goodonehoney	Jason Egan	Steve Hamilton	Godolphin, LLC	3.30-1	$7,500

- Winning Breeder: Hargus Sexton, Sandra Sexton & SilverFern Farm, LLC; (KY)
- Final Time: 1:50.17
- Track Condition: Sloppy (Sealed)
- Total Attendance: Record of 48,265

== See also ==
- 2018 Preakness Stakes
- Black-Eyed Susan Stakes Stakes "top three finishers" and # of starters
