= 2020 Black-Eyed Susan Stakes =

Horse race held at Pimlico Race Course

96th George E. Mitchell Black-Eyed Susan Stakes
- Black-Eyed Susan Stakes
- Location: Pimlico Race Course, Baltimore, Maryland, United States
- Date: October 3, 2020
- Winning horse: Miss Marissa
- Jockey: Daniel Centeno
- Conditions: Fast
- Surface: Dirt

The 2020 George E. Mitchell Black-Eyed Susan Stakes was the 96th running of the George E. Mitchell Stakes (renamed by Pimlico in 2020). The race took place on October 3, 2020, and was televised in the United States as part of the NBC main card. Ridden by jockey Daniel Centeno, Miss Marissa won the race by a neck runner-up Bonny South. Approximate post time on the Friday evening before the Preakness Stakes was 4:45 p.m. Eastern Time. The Maryland Jockey Club supplied a purse of $250,000 for the 96th running. The race was run over a fast track in a final time of 1:48.08. The race was run behind closed doors.

== Payout ==
The 96th Black-Eyed Susan Stakes Payout Schedule

Program Number	Horse Name	Win	Place	Show
9	Miss Marissa	$22.20	$7.80	$4.80
5	Bonnie South	-	$2.80	$2.20
8	Hopeful Growth	-	-	$3.20

$2 Exacta: (9–5) paid $ 63.20

$1 Trifecta: (9–5–8) paid $ 132.20

$1 Superfecta: (9–5–8-7) paid $ 617.10

== The full chart ==
Finish Position	Lengths Behind	Post Position	Horse name	Jockey	Trainer	Owner	Post Time Odds	Purse Earnings
1st	0	9	Miss Marissa	Daniel Centeno	James Ryerson	Alfonso Cammarota	10.10-1	$150,000
2nd	Neck	5	Bonny South	Florent Geroux	Brad Cox	Juddmonte Farm	0.90-1 favorite	$50,000
3rd	1-3/4	8	Hopeful Growth	Trevor McCarthy	Anthony Margotta	St. Elias Stable	5.60-1	$25,000
4th	3-3/4	7	Mizzen Beau	Brian Hernandez	Norm Casse	Daniel Investment Holdings	8.10-1	$15,000
5th	4-1/2	4	Dream Marie	Joe Bravo	Matthew Williams	Miracle's International Trading, Inc.	18.20-1	$7,500
6th	8-3/4	1	Project Whiskey	Victor Carrasco	Robert Reid Jr.	Cash Is King LLC & LC Racing	18.80-1	$2,500
7th	143/4	6	Sharp Star	Alex Cintron	Horacio DePaz	Barry K.Schwartz	39.50-1	
8th	151/2	2	Truth Hurts	Sheldon Russell	Chad Summers	Chad Summers & J Stables	34.10-1	
9th	183/4	11	Perfect Alibi	Paco Lopez	Mark E. Casse	Tracy Farmer	10.10-1	
10th	22	3	So Damn Hot	Gabriel Saez	George Weaver	Stetson Racing, Rita Riccelli & Donato Lanni	8.90-1	

- Winning Breeder: Woodford Thoroughbreds; (KY)
- Final Time: 1:48.08
- Track Condition: Fast
- Race run behind closed doors under Maryland health orders.

== See also ==
- 2020 Preakness Stakes
- Black-Eyed Susan Stakes Stakes "top three finishers" and # of starters
