= 2019 Black-Eyed Susan Stakes =

Horse race held at Pimlico Race Course

95th Black-Eyed Susan Stakes
- Black-Eyed Susan Stakes
- Location: Pimlico Race Course, Baltimore, Maryland, United States
- Date: May 17, 2019
- Winning horse: Point of Honor
- Jockey: Javier Castellano
- Conditions: Fast
- Surface: Dirt

The 2019 Black-Eyed Susan Stakes was the 95th running of the Black-Eyed Susan Stakes. The race took place on May 17, 2019, and was televised in the United States on the NBC Sports Network. Ridden by jockey Javier Castellano, Point of Honor won the race by a half length over runner-up Ulele. Approximate post time on the Friday evening before the Preakness Stakes was 4:40 p.m. Eastern Time. The Maryland Jockey Club supplied a purse of $250,000 for the 95th running. The race was run over a fast track in a final time of 1:51.87. The Maryland Jockey Club reported a Black-Eyed Susan Stakes Day record attendance of 51,573. The attendance at Pimlico Race Course that day was a record crowd for Black-Eyed Susan Stakes Day and the fifth largest for a thoroughbred race in North America in 2019.

== Payout ==
The 95th Black-Eyed Susan Stakes Payout Schedule

Program Number	Horse Name	Win	Place	Show
8	Point of Honor	$7.80	$4.60	$3.20
3	Ulele	-	$7.80	$5.00
4	Cookie Dough	-	-	$3.80

$2 Exacta: (8–3) paid $ 71.20

$1 Trifecta: (8–3–4) paid $ 210.30

$1 Superfecta: (8–3–4-78) paid $ 678.20

== The full chart ==
Finish Position	Lengths Behind	Post Position	Horse name	Trainer	Jockey	Owner	Post Time Odds	Purse Earnings
1st	0	8	Point of Honor	George Weaver	Javier Castellano	Eclipse Thoroughbred Partners and Stetson Racing, LLC	2.90-1	$150,000
2nd	1/2	3	Ulele	Brad Cox	Joel Rosario	Cheyanne Stables, LLC	7.30-1	$50,000
3rd	2-1/4	4	Cookie Dough	Stanley Gold	Irad Ortiz, Jr.	Arindel Farm	4.00-1	$25,000
4th	4-1/4	7	Brill	Jerry Hollendorfer	Florent Geroux	OXO Equine LLC	4.10-1	$15,000
5th	4-1/2	2	Off Topic	Todd Pletcher	John Velazquez	Paul P. Pompa, Jr.	8.30-1	$7,500
6th	7	2	Always Shopping	Todd Pletcher	Manuel Franco	Repole Stable	2.80-1 favorite	$2,500
7th	103/4	9	Las Setas	Katherine Voss	Jevian Toledo	Wayne A. Harrison	19.20-1	
8th	121/2	5	Our Super Freak	Jamie Ness	Trevor McCarthy	Jagger Inc.	4.90-1	
9th	Scratch	1	Sweet Diane	n/a	n/a	n/a	n/a	

- Winning Breeder: Sienna Farms, LLC; (KY)
- Final Time: 1:47.88
- Track Condition: Fast
- Total Attendance: Record of 51,573

== See also ==
- 2019 Preakness Stakes
- Black-Eyed Susan Stakes Stakes "top three finishers" and # of starters
