= 2009 Black-Eyed Susan Stakes =

Horse race held at Pimlico Race Course

85th Black-Eyed Susan Stakes
- Black-Eyed Susan Stakes
- Location: Pimlico Race Course, Baltimore, Maryland, United States
- Date: May 15, 2009
- Winning horse: Payton d'Oro
- Jockey: Terry Thompson
- Conditions: Fast
- Surface: Dirt

The 2009 Black-Eyed Susan Stakes was the 85th running of the Black-Eyed Susan Stakes. The race took place in Baltimore, Maryland on May 15, 2009, and was televised in the United States on the Bravo TV network owned by NBC. Ridden by jockey Terry Thompson, Payton d'Oro, won the race by one and one quarter lengths over runner-up Bon Jovi Girl. Approximate post time on the evening before the Preakness Stakes was 5:50 p.m. Eastern Time and the race was run for a purse of $150,000. The race was run over a fast track in a final time of 1:49.75. The Maryland Jockey Club reported total attendance of 23,819.

== Payout ==
The 85th Black-Eyed Susan Stakes Payout Schedule

| Program Number | Horse Name | Win | Place | Show |
|---|---|---|---|---|
| 2 | Payton d'Oro | $7.20 | $4.40 | $3.00 |
| 5 | Bon Jovi Girl | - | $7.40 | $4.20 |
| 7 | Casanova Move | - | - | $2.60 |

$2 Exacta: (2–5) paid $62.80

$2 Trifecta: (2–5–7) paid $166.60

$1 Superfecta: (2–5–7–6) paid $809.30

== The full chart ==
| Finish Position | Lengths Behind | Post Position | Horse name | Trainer | Jockey | Owner | Post Time Odds | Purse Earnings |
|---|---|---|---|---|---|---|---|---|
| 1st | 0 | 2 | Payton d'Oro | J. Larry Jones | Terry Thompson | Mike Pressley & Edward D. Taylor | 2.60-1 | $90,000 |
| 2nd | 11/4 | 5 | Bon Jovi Girl | Timothy F. Ritchey | Jose C. Caraballo | Kilboy Estate Inc. | 7.00-1 | $30,000 |
| 3rd | 61/2 | 7 | Casanova Move | James A. Jerkens | Jose Lezcano | Edward P. Evans | 1.70-1 favorite | $15,000 |
| 4th | 71/4 | 6 | Stage Trick | Alan E. Goldberg | Javier Castellano | Jayeff B Stables | 38.60-1 | $9,000 |
| 5th | 71/2 | 3 | Combinate | Rodney Jenkins | Eric Camacho | Concepts Unlimited Stable | 41.40-1 | $4,500 |
| 6th | 8 | 4 | Stone Legacy | D. Wayne Lukas | Kent J. Desormeaux | Marylou Whitney Stables | 6.80-1 | |
| 7th | 201/2 | 10 | Renda | Juan D. Arias | Sebastian O. Madrid | Richard Rowan | 20.90-1 | |
| 8th | 311/4 | 8 | Don't Forget Gil | Dallas Stewart | Kent J. Desormeaux | Alan Brodsky | 3.30-1 | |
| 9th | dnf | 1 | Hooh Why | Gary M. Scherer | Ronald Dale Allen | Mark Hoffman | 2.00-1 | scratch |
| 10th | dnf | 9 | Oro Blanco | Timothy J. Tullock | Jeremy Rose | Everest Stables, Inc. | 12.00-1 | scratch |

- Winning Breeder: T/C Stable & James Catter; (KY)
- Final Time: 1:49.75
- Track Condition: Fast
- Total Attendance: 23,819

== See also ==
- 2009 Preakness Stakes
- Black-Eyed Susan Stakes Stakes "top three finishers" and # of starters
