= 2017 Black-Eyed Susan Stakes =

Horse race held at Pimlico Race Course

93rd Black-Eyed Susan Stakes
- Black-Eyed Susan Stakes
- Location: Pimlico Race Course, Baltimore, Maryland, United States
- Date: May 19, 2017
- Winning horse: Actress
- Jockey: Nik Juarez
- Conditions: Fast
- Surface: Dirt

The 2017 Black-Eyed Susan Stakes was the 93rd running of the Black-Eyed Susan Stakes. The race took place on May 19, 2016, and was televised in the United States on the NBC Sports Network. Ridden by jockey Nik Juarez, Actress won the race by a head over runner-up Lights of Medina. Approximate post time on the Friday evening before the Preakness Stakes was 4:50 p.m. Eastern Time. The Maryland Jockey Club supplied a purse of $300,000 for the 93rd running. The race was run over a fast track in a final time of 1:51.87. The Maryland Jockey Club reported a Black-Eyed Susan Stakes Day record attendance of 50,339. The attendance at Pimlico Race Course that day was a record crowd for Black-Eyed Susan Stakes Day and the sixth largest for a thoroughbred race in North America in 2017.

== Payout ==
The 93rd Black-Eyed Susan Stakes Payout Schedule

Program Number	Horse Name	Win	Place	Show
10	Actress	$27.60	$10.60	$7.80
5	Lights of Medina	-	$5.80	$4.60
6	Corporate Queen	-	-	$10.20

$2 Exacta: (10–5) paid $ 240.20

$2 Trifecta: (10–5–6) paid $ 3,898.60

$1 Superfecta: (10–5–6-8) paid $ 16,579.20

== The full chart ==
Finish Position	Lengths Behind	Post Position	Horse name	Jockey	Trainer	Owner	Post Time Odds	Purse Earnings
1st	0	10	Actress	Nik Juarez	Jason Servis	Gary & Mary West	12.80-1	$180,000
2nd	1/2	5	Lights of Medina	Feargal Lynch	Todd Pletcher	Sumaya U.S. Stable	5.10-1	$60,000
3rd	2-1/4	6	Corporate Queen	Joel Rosario	Todd Pletcher	Gary Barber & Bobby Flay	26.20-1	$30,000
4th	3-1/2	8	Torrent	José Ortiz	Ron Moquett	Westrock Stables LLC	21.50-1	$15,000
5th	5-1/4	7	Moana	John Velazquez	Todd Pletcher	Bridlewood Farm	3.90-1	$7,500
6th	9	2	Tapa Tapa Tapa	Jesus Castanon	Timothy Hamm	Beau Ravine LLC	7.90-1	$2,500
7th	103/4	1	Shimmering Aspen	Steve Hamilton	Rodney Jenkins	Hillwood Stable, LLC	3.40-1 favorite	
8th	111/2	9	Summer Luck	Javier Castellano	Mark Casse	Gary Barber	4.90-1	
9th	163/4	3	Dancing Rags	Trevor McCarthy	H. Graham Motion	Chadds Ford Stable	11.90-1	
10th	251/4	9	Yorkiepoo Princess	Horacio Karamanos	Edward Barker	Danny J. Chen	23.00-1	
11th	251/4	4	Full House	Rajiv Maragh	James Jerkens	Joseph V. Shields, Jr.	11.40-1	

- Winning Breeder: Gary & Mary West Stables, Inc.; (KY)
- Final Time: 1:51.87
- Track Condition: Fast
- Total Attendance: Record of 50,339

== See also ==
- 2017 Preakness Stakes
- Black-Eyed Susan Stakes Stakes "top three finishers" and # of starters
