= 2011 Black-Eyed Susan Stakes =

Horse race held at Pimlico Race Course

87th Black-Eyed Susan Stakes
- Black-Eyed Susan Stakes
- Location: Pimlico Race Course, Baltimore, Maryland, United States
- Date: May 14, 2011
- Winning horse: Royal Delta
- Jockey: Jose Lezcano
- Conditions: Fast
- Surface: Dirt

The 2011 Black-Eyed Susan Stakes was the 87th running of the Black-Eyed Susan Stakes. The race took place in Baltimore, Maryland on May 14, 2011, and was televised in the United States on the NBC Sports Network. Ridden by jockey Jose Lezcano, Royal Delta won the race by two and a half lengths over runner-up Buster's Ready. Approximate post time on the Friday evening before the Preakness Stakes was 4:46 p.m. Eastern Time and the race was run for a purse of $300,000. The race was run over a fast track in a final time of 1:49.60. The Maryland Jockey Club reported total attendance of 27,966. The attendance at Pimlico Race Course that day was a record crowd for Black-Eyed Susan Stakes Day.

== Payout ==
The 87th Black-Eyed Susan Stakes Payout Schedule

Program Number	Horse Name	Win	Place	Show
1	Royal Delta	$5.60	$3.60	$2.60
5	Buster's Ready	-	$5.20	$2.60
2	Hot Summer	-	-	$2.80

$2 Exacta: (1–5) paid $34.20

$2 Trifecta: (1–5–2) paid $106.00

$1 Superfecta: (1–5–2–6) paid $77.30

== The full chart ==
Finish Position	Lengths Behind	Post Position	Horse name	Trainer	Jockey	Owner	Post Time Odds	Purse Earnings
1st	0	1	Royal Delta	Bill Mott	Jose Lezcano	Palides Investments	3.00-1	$180,000
2nd	21/2	5	Buster's Ready	Todd A. Pletcher	John R. Velazquez	Edward P. Evans	8.00-1	$60,000
3rd	73/4	2	Hot Summer	David Fawkes	Ramon Dominguez	Harold L. Queen	2.50-1	$30,000
4th	131/4	6	Love Theway Youare	Myung Kwon Cho	David R. Flores	Myung Kwon Cho	12.00-1	$18,000
5th	151/4	4	Wyomia	Daniel J. Vella	Justin Stein	E. Seltzer & B. Anderson	1.80-1 favorite	$9,000
6th	dnf	3	Coax Liberty	James L. Lawrence	David Cohen	Copper Penny Stables	8.00-1	scratch
7th	dnf	7	Art of the Hunt	Frannie Campitelli	Luis Garcia	Rosalee C. Davison	scratch	scratch

- Winning Breeder: Colts Neck Stables; (KY)
- Final Time: 1:49.60
- Track Condition: Fast
- Total Attendance: 32,473

== See also ==
- 2011 Preakness Stakes
- Black-Eyed Susan Stakes Stakes "top three finishers" and # of starters
