= Close Hatches =

American-bred Thoroughbred racehorse

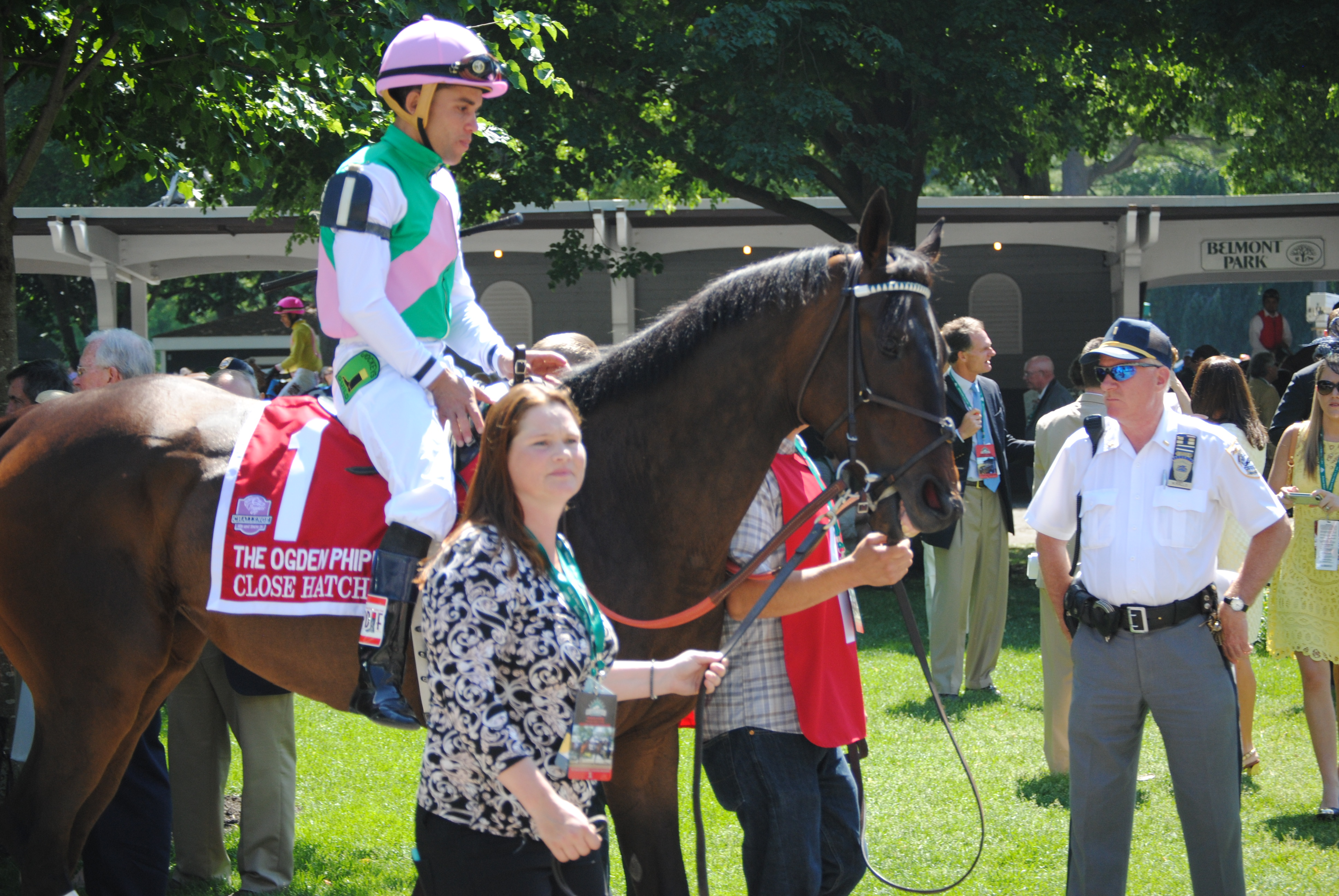
- Close Hatches in the walking ring for the 2014 Ogden Phipps
- Sire: First Defence
- Grandsire: Unbridled's Song
- Dam: Rising Tornado
- Damsire: Storm Cat
- Sex: Mare
- Foaled: 31 January 2010
- Country: United States
- Colour: Dark Bay or Brown
- Breeder: Millsec Limited
- Owner: Juddmonte Farms
- Trainer: Bill Mott
- Record: 13: 9-2-0
- Earnings: $2,707,300

Major wins
- Gazelle Stakes (2013); Mother Goose Stakes (2013); Cotillion Handicap (2013); Azeri Stakes (2014); Apple Blossom Handicap (2014); Ogden Phipps Handicap (2014); Personal Ensign Stakes (2014)

Awards
- American Champion Older Female Horse (2014)

Close Hatches (foaled January 31, 2010) is a retired American Thoroughbred racehorse. Unraced as a two-year-old, she emerged as one of the leading fillies of her generation in the United States in 2013 when she won five of her eight races including the Gazelle Stakes, Mother Goose Stakes and Cotillion Handicap. In the following year she won the Grade II Azeri Stakes before recording successive Grade I victories in the Apple Blossom Handicap, Ogden Phipps Handicap and Personal Ensign Stakes.

== Background ==
Close Hatches is a dark bay or brown mare bred in Kentucky by Millsec Limited, a horse breeding company registered at Khalid Abdullah's Banstead Manor Stud in Newmarket, Suffolk. She raced in the colours of Khalid Abdullah's Juddmonte Farm organisation, as did both of her parents. She is from the first crop of foals sired by First Defence who won the Grade I Forego Stakes in 2008 and is the first foal of her dam Rising Tornado, who failed to win in three minor races in France. Rising Tornado's dam Silver Star was a full-sister to Xaar, the leading European two-year-old of 1997, and as a descendant of the broodmare Best In Show, was related to numerous major winners including El Gran Senor and Rags to Riches. Close Hatches was trained throughout her racing career by Bill Mott. She was ridden in all but one of her races by the Dominican jockey Joel Rosario.

== Racing career ==
=== 2013: three-year-old season ===
Close Hatches did not race as a two-year-old, beginning her racing career at Gulfstream Park in early 2013. On her debut on January 26, she won a maiden race over seven furlongs, taking the lead on the final turn and drawing away to win by seven lengths from ten opponents. Five weeks later, she started 9/10 favorite for an allowance race over one and one sixteenth miles at the same course and led from the start to win by one and a quarter lengths from Kimberly Jean. On April 16, the filly was moved up in class for the Grade II Gazelle Stakes over nine furlongs at Aqueduct Racetrack and stated favorite in a six-runner field. She took the lead from the start, fought off a challenge from Princess of Sylmar, and drew away to win by three and a quarter lengths.

Close Hatches started at odds of 7.7/1 for the Kentucky Oaks at Churchill Downs on May 3, but was never in serious contention and finished seventh of the ten runners behind Princess of Sylmar, almost eleven lengths behind the winner. In the Acorn Stakes at Belmont Park twenty-four days later, she finished well but never looked a threat to the winner Midnight Lucky, finishing second, beaten six and a quarter lengths. At the same track four weeks later, Close Hatches was the second choice in the betting, behind the 1/5 favorite Dreaming of Julia in the Grade I Mother Goose Stakes over 8 1/2 furlongs. She started well but settled towards the rear of the five runner field before making a forward move on the outside just after half way and taking the lead approaching the final turn. In the straight, she increased her advantage and won by seven and a quarter lengths from Dreaming of Julia. After the race, Rosario commented, "It was easy and I think it was only a one-horse race turning for home.”

After a break of three months, Close Hatches returned in the Grade I Cotillion Stakes at Parx on September 21 and carried top weight of 124 pounds. Ridden for the first and only time by Mike Smith, she started the 8/5 favourite against eight opponents headed by the sprinter Sweet Lulu, the winner of the Test Stakes. Smith positioned Close Hatches just behind the front-running Sweet Lulu on the outside before taking the lead in the straight and went clear in the closing stages to win by two lengths. On November 1, Close Hatches was matched against older fillies and mares for the first time in the Breeders' Cup Distaff at Santa Anita Park, and started the 15/2 third choice in the betting market behind Royal Delta, Princess of Sylmar and Beholder. She moved up into second place in the straight but could make no impact on Beholder and was beaten four and a quarter lengths by the winner.

=== 2014: four-year-old season ===
Close Hatches began her four-year-old season with two races at Oaklawn Park. On 15 March, she started 3/5 favorite for the Grade II Azeri Stakes, and won by one and a quarter lengths from Magic Union, having taken the lead soon after the start. Four weeks later, she started 7/10 favorite for the Grade I Apple Blossom Handicap, in which she was opposed by On Fire Baby, a five-year-old mare who had won the race the previous year. Close Hatches led from the start and won by one and a quarter lengths from On Fire Baby. After the race Rosario said, "She's really classy. I was always confident. She's the kind of horse that's always honest. She tries hard every time. I was just concerned with making sure she didn't go too fast, so she'd have something left at the end, and she did. She's a great horse."

On June 7, Close Hatches faced Beholder and Princess of Sylmar in the Grade I Ogden Phipps Stakes at Belmont and started the 2.9/1 third favorite. The filly settled in third place behind Classic Point and Antipathy before moving up on the outside to take the lead over 2 1/2 furlongs out. In the straight, she held off a strong challenge from Princess of Sylmar to win by a head, with Anitipathy, Beholder, and Belle Gallantey close behind. Commenting on the victory, Mott said, "We’ve been pointing toward this race since early spring and it's just one of those cases where things worked out, where you made a plan and things come to fruition." In the Personal Ensign Stakes at Saratoga Race Course on August 22, Close Hatches started 1.95/1 favorite against six rivals including Princess of Sylmar, Antipathy, Belle Gallantey (winner of the Delaware Handicap in July), and Fiftyshadesofhay. She took the lead soon after the start, went three lengths clear entering the straight, and increased her advantage in the closing stages to win by five lengths from Fiftyshadesofhay. The Blood-Horse described her success as "a dominating victory" which "strengthened her hold on the older female division".

Close Hatches started 1/5 favorite to win her fourth consecutive Grade I race when she contested the Spinster Stakes at Keeneland on October 5. She took an early lead but faded in the straight and finished fourth behind Don't Tell Sophia, Ria Antonia, and Molly Morgan. Rosario offered no excuses for the beaten favorite, commenting, "Normally when they come to her she keeps on going and improves her position. Probably today was not her day.”

On October 31, Close Hatches started 3/1 second favorite behind the three-year-old Untapable in her second attempt to win the Breeders’ Cup Distaff. She was forced wide in the early stages but held a good position for most of the way before dropping back three furlongs out and finishing last of the eleven runners. Mott described her run as "dismal" and added, "I can’t offer any excuse other than she looks like maybe she’s had enough."

Despite the loss, Close Hatches was named the Champion Older Female Dirt Horse of 2014.

== Retirement and breeding career ==
Close Hatches was retired after the Breeders' Cup and was subsequently bred to leading sire Tapit. On February 21, 2016, she produced her first foal, a colt named Tacitus, who romped to win the Suburban Stakes by eight lengths in 2020 and also won the 2019 Tampa Bay Derby and Wood Memorial Stakes.

Close Hatches progeny:

- Tacitus foaled February 21, 2016, grey stallion sired by Tapit. winner of the three graded stakes races the 2019 Tampa Bay Derby, Wood Memorial Stakes, and 2020 Suburban Stakes.
- Atheer foaled February 20, 2017, dark bay mare foaled February 20, 2017. Never raced
- Maximus Aurelius foaled February 16, 2018, Bay stallion sired by Tapit. Won one time in 11 career races.
- Sense Of Destiny foaled February 201 2017, dark bay mare foaled February 20, 2017. Never raced
- Scylla foaled March 16, 2020, bay mare sired by Tapit. 2025 Breeders' Cup Distaff champion
- Batten Down March 11, 2021, grey stallion sired by Tapid, winner of the 2024 Ohio Derby

== Pedigree ==
Pedigree of Close Hatches (USA), dark bay or brown filly, 2010
Sire First Defence (USA) 2004	Unbridled's Song (USA); 1993	Unbridled	Fappiano
Sire First Defence (USA) 2004	Unbridled's Song (USA); 1993	Unbridled	Gana Facil
Sire First Defence (USA) 2004	Unbridled's Song (USA); 1993	Trolley Song	Caro
Sire First Defence (USA) 2004	Unbridled's Song (USA); 1993	Trolley Song	Lucky Spell
Sire First Defence (USA) 2004	Honest Lady (USA); 1996	Seattle Slew	Bold Reasoning
Sire First Defence (USA) 2004	Honest Lady (USA); 1996	Seattle Slew	My Charmer
Sire First Defence (USA) 2004	Honest Lady (USA); 1996	Toussaud	El Gran Senor
Sire First Defence (USA) 2004	Honest Lady (USA); 1996	Toussaud	Image of Reality
Dam Rising Tornado (USA) 2005	Storm Cat (USA); 1983	Storm Bird	Northern Dancer
Dam Rising Tornado (USA) 2005	Storm Cat (USA); 1983	Storm Bird	South Ocean
Dam Rising Tornado (USA) 2005	Storm Cat (USA); 1983	Terlingua	Secretariat
Dam Rising Tornado (USA) 2005	Storm Cat (USA); 1983	Terlingua	Crimson Saint
Dam Rising Tornado (USA) 2005	Silver Star (GB); 1996	Zafonic	Gone West
Dam Rising Tornado (USA) 2005	Silver Star (GB); 1996	Zafonic	Zaizafon
Dam Rising Tornado (USA) 2005	Silver Star (GB); 1996	Monroe	Sir Ivor
Dam Rising Tornado (USA) 2005	Silver Star (GB); 1996	Monroe	Best In Show (Family:8-f)
