= Beholder (horse) =

American-bred Thoroughbred racehorse

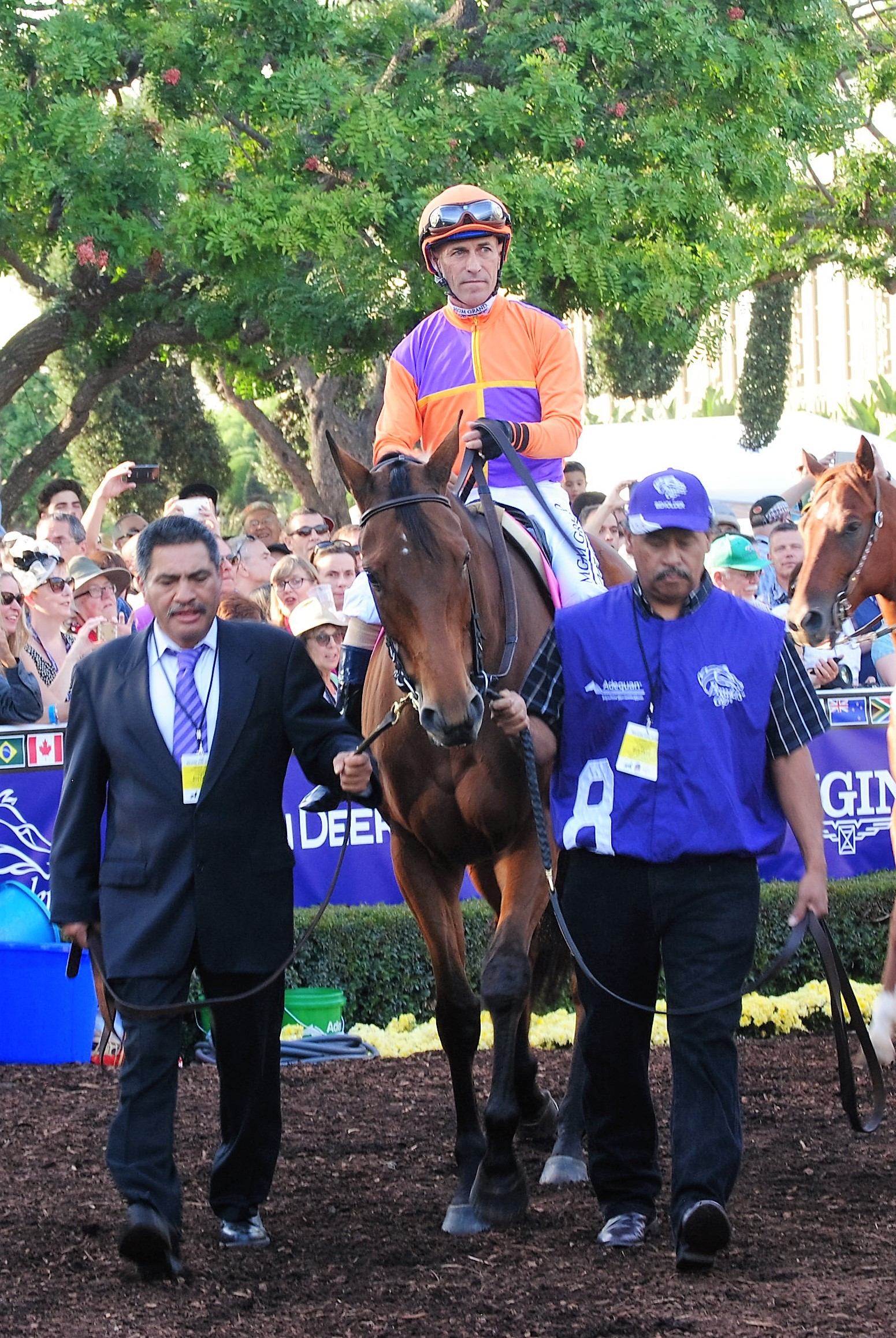
- Beholder in the walking ring for the 2016 Breeders' Cup Distaff
- Sire: Henny Hughes
- Grandsire: Hennessy
- Dam: Leslie's Lady
- Damsire: Tricky Creek
- Sex: Mare
- Foaled: May 9, 2010
- Country: United States
- Colour: Bay
- Breeder: Clarkland Farm
- Owner: Spendthrift Farm
- Trainer: Richard Mandella
- Record: 26: 18-6-0
- Earnings: $6,156,000

Major wins
- Santa Ynez Stakes (2013); Las Virgenes Stakes (2013); Santa Anita Oaks (2013); Zenyatta Stakes (2013, 2014, 2015); Santa Lucia Stakes (2014, 2015); Adoration Stakes (2015, 2016); Clement L. Hirsch Stakes (2015); Pacific Classic (2015); Vanity Mile (2016) Breeders' Cup wins: Breeders' Cup Juvenile Fillies (2012); Breeders' Cup Distaff (2013, 2016)

Awards
- American Champion Two-Year-Old Filly (2012); American Champion Three-Year-Old Filly (2013); American Champion Older Dirt Female Horse (2015, 2016)

Honours
- Beholder Mile Stakes; National Museum of Racing and Hall of Fame, 2022

Beholder (foaled May 9, 2010) is an American Thoroughbred racehorse and multiple Eclipse Award winner. She was purchased as a yearling by B. Wayne Hughes of Spendthrift Farm. She had an early reputation for being difficult to handle, but trainer Richard Mandella worked extensively with the fractious young horse, gradually developing her from a temperamental front-runner into a seasoned veteran who could be placed in strategic positions.

As a two-year-old in 2012, she won three of her five races including the Breeders' Cup Juvenile Fillies and was voted American Champion Two-Year-Old Filly. In the following season, she won five of her seven races, including the Breeders' Cup Distaff. With the Breeders' Cup win, she became the first horse to win both the Breeders' Cup Juvenile Fillies and the Distaff in consecutive years, and concluded her three-year-old season by being named American Champion Three-Year-Old Filly. After a four-year-old season plagued by injuries and illness, with a single graded stakes win in three attempts, she returned to form as a five-year-old with multiple stakes wins, becoming the first filly or mare to win the Pacific Classic and was voted American Champion Older Dirt Female Horse. In doing so, she became the first horse since 1976, male or female, to win Grade 1 stakes races at age 2, 3, 4, and 5. In 2016, she extended this achievement by winning the Grade I Vanity Stakes, and in doing so tied the record of John Henry for winning a Grade I race five years in a row. She closed out her career winning the 2016 Breeders' Cup Distaff in a dramatic stretch run, prevailing by a scant nose over Songbird. She received her second Eclipse Award as Champion Older Dirt Female Horse at the end of the year and retired in 2016 having tied Goldikova as one of only two horses to have ever won three Breeders' Cup Championships. In 2022, she was named to the National Museum of Racing and Hall of Fame.

== Background ==
Beholder is a bay mare with no white markings, other than two small specks of white on her forehead. She was bred by Fred Mitchell's Clarkland Farm in Lexington, Kentucky. She was sired by Henny Hughes, a sprinter whose biggest wins came in the King's Bishop Stakes and Vosburgh Stakes in 2006. Beholder's dam, Leslie's Lady, won five races out of 28 starts, including the listed Hoosier Debutante Stakes in 1998, and was purchased by Mitchell in 2006 for $100,000. Leslie's Lady was a descendant of the broodmare Last Bird, making her a distant relative of the Kentucky Derby winner I'll Have Another. Beholder's older half-brother, Into Mischief (sired by Harlan's Holiday), won the 2007 CashCall Futurity and the 2008 Damascus Stakes, and her younger half-brother Mendelssohn won the 2017 Breeders' Cup Juvenile Turf and the 2018 UAE Derby. Leslie's Lady was named the 2016 Kentucky Broodmare of the Year.

As a yearling, Beholder was consigned by the Clarkland Farm to the sale at Keeneland in September 2011, where she was bought for $180,000 by B. Wayne Hughes' Spendthrift Farm. At age two, the filly was sent into training with California-based trainer Richard Mandella.

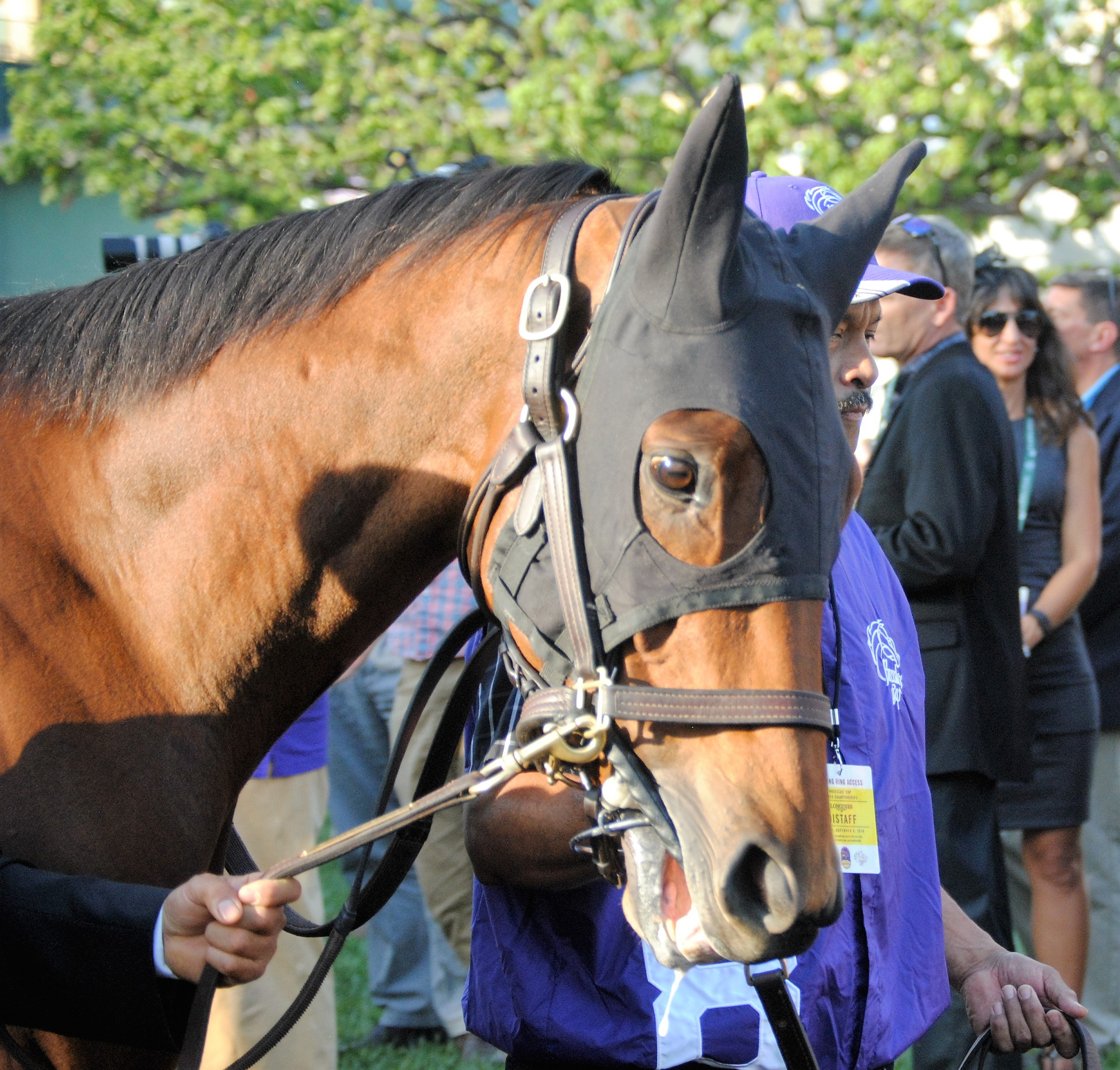
Beholder in her hood and earmuffs

Beholder initially developed a reputation as a "temperamental diva." As a young filly, she was prone to rearing when she got upset and later turned to bucking. But the people who worked with her every day viewed her differently; her exercise rider in 2013, David Nuesch, described her as "straightforward", explaining, "she kind of likes it to be her idea and doesn't want to be told too much what to do." Her groom, Ruben Mercado, said she was a "little angel" in the stables but "all business" on the track. Mandella used earplugs and a hood with ear coverings (colloquially called "earmuffs") to help keep her focused. At one point, he tried giving her ear buds, but the sound upset her even more. Mandella was described as the "perfect" trainer for her, as he was willing to try different training techniques to keep her from getting in her own way, took the time to figure out her quirks, and learned to anticipate her behavior. The bond and depth of communication between trainer and horse was noted in the press. Mandella's son Gary described Beholder as having an "Alpha Male perspective", explaining, "She's actually dominant, bullyish and head strong. She's not quirky because she's worried that something is lurking around the corner. The things that she does that are hard to manage are because she's tougher than you."

As she aged, her behavior improved, and she began to behave like a seasoned veteran. Mandella gave credit to the horse: "I’d say she brought me along. I haven‘t brought her along. I’ve just been along for the ride." By her six-year-old season, following her 17th career win, which was also her sixth consecutive victory, Mandella said of Beholder, "Good horses come along, and there are a few great ones, but to be great and stay great, it really is special."

== Racing career ==
Silks of Spendthrift Farm, owner of Beholder

=== 2012: two-year-old season ===
Beholder was ridden in all of her two-year-old races by Garrett Gomez. She began her racing career by finishing fourth behind Executiveprivilege in a maiden race on the Cushion Track at Hollywood Park Racetrack on June 28. A month later, she recorded her first win in a maiden race at Del Mar racetrack, beating Fanticola by 3 1/4 lengths. On September 2, she was moved up to Grade I class for the Del Mar Debutante Stakes over seven furlongs. Starting at odds of 8.1–1, she hit the starting gate but took an early lead, leading by 2 1/2 lengths in homestretch, but she was caught by Executiveprivilege at the finish line and was beaten a nose. Beholder moved to Santa Anita Park in October. Because she remained keyed up after the previous race and upset by the stress from shipping, Mandella chose to put her in an easier race than a Grade I to see if she would settle down enough to contest the Breeders' Cup later in the year. She was entered into a six-furlong allowance race and won by eleven lengths despite being eased in the closing stages. On November 2 at Santa Anita, Beholder was one of eight fillies to contest the Breeders' Cup Juvenile Fillies over one mile. She was the 9–2 joint second choice in the betting behind Executiveprivilege, who was made the 13–8 favourite. Beholder took the lead from the start and broke clear of the field to open up a three-length advantage on the final turn. She held off the late challenge of Executiveprivilege to win by a length.

=== 2013: three-year-old season ===
Beholder began her three-year-old season in the Grade II Santa Ynez Stakes over seven furlongs at Santa Anita on January 21. She started the 1–5 favorite but was beaten three-quarters of a length by Renee's Titan. An explanation for her poor performance emerged a week later when an examination revealed an ulcer in her throat. At the same course on March 2, Beholder started 4–5 favorite for the Grade I Las Virgenes Stakes over one mile. She led from the start and was never seriously challenged, winning by 3 3/4 lengths from Fiftyshadesofhay. Beholder's next race was the Grade I Santa Anita Oaks on April 6, for which she started the 3–10 favorite. Despite an unfavorable draw, she quickly went into the lead and went clear of the field in the straight to win by 2 3/4 lengths from Iotapa. Mandella described the winner as having "the heart of a warrior". Throughout her spring campaign, she continued to be ridden by Gomez.

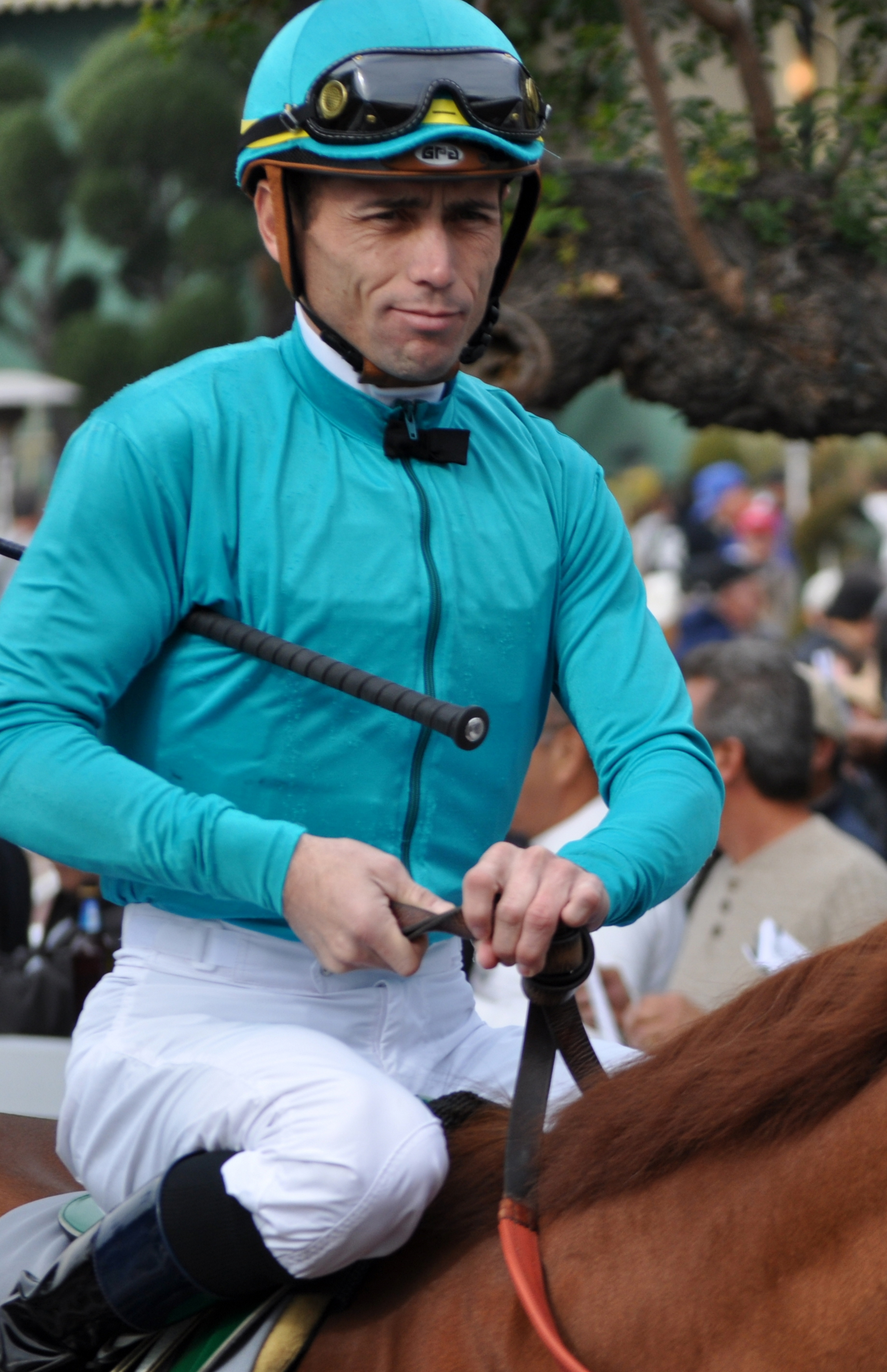
Garrett Gomez

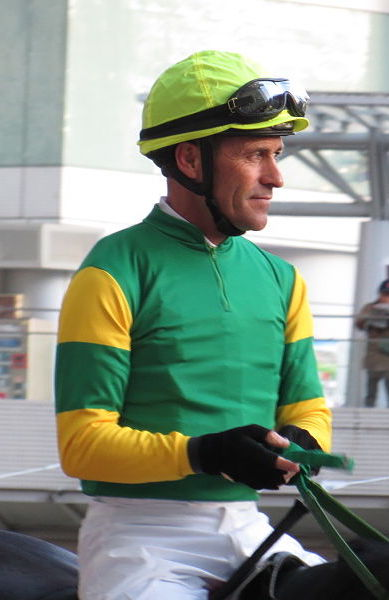
Gary Stevens

Beholder's jockeys in 2013

In the Kentucky Oaks on May 3 at Churchill Downs, Beholder started at odds of 9–1 in a field of ten fillies, with the Gulfstream Oaks winner Dreaming of Julia the 6–4 favorite. It was the first time she had been shipped outside of California. Beholder tracked the leader, Midnight Lucky, before moving into the lead in the homestretch but was overtaken in the closing stages by the 39–1 outsider Princess of Sylmar and finished second, beaten by half a length. Her loss was attributed in part to her behavior in the post parade. Without her training earmuffs, she was anxious and upset by the crowd noise, fought to get away from the track pony that was leading her to the gate, and partially fell down, forcing Gomez to jump off. Sportswriters described her as "angry" and adrenaline-filled, while Mandella described her as "rattled." After the race, Gomez speculated that if Princess of Sylmar had been closer as she passed, instead of well to the outside, Beholder's fighting instincts still might have been enough to have held out for the victory. However, he also commented at the time that she relied on speed to win, and if she was slowed down, she had difficulty regaining momentum.

After a break of almost four months, Beholder returned in the Torrey Pines Stakes over one mile at Del Mar on September 1, where she was ridden for the first time by Gary Stevens. She started the 1–10 favorite and led all the way, winning from second-place finisher Wittgenstein. Four weeks later, Beholder was matched against older fillies and mares in the Grade I Zenyatta Stakes over eight and a half furlongs at Santa Anita. She led from the start and won, with the six-year-old veteran Authenticity in second. Mandella called the winner "a filly that really likes the fight" while Stevens said that "I haven't gotten close to the bottom of her yet". On November 1, Beholder contested the Breeders' Cup Distaff over nine furlongs at Santa Anita. The field was a very strong one, including Royal Delta who had won the race for the last two years, Princess of Sylmar, Authenticity, and Close Hatches. Although Beholder showed some anxiety in the starting gate, she had a clean start. Mandella had been training her so that instead of always being a front-runner, she could be rated behind other horses and conserve energy. His strategy was a success as Beholder tracked the leaders before moving up into second place half a mile from the finish. She took the lead two furlongs out and went clear of the field to win by 4 1/4 lengths over Close Hatches, with Royal Delta fourth and Princess of Sylmar last of the six runners. After the race, Mandella said, "I’ve been lucky enough to have many good mares in my years of training, but this mare might have to be the best of all." With her Distaff win, she became the first horse to win both the Breeders' Cup Juvenile Fillies and the Distaff in consecutive years.

=== 2014: four-year-old season ===
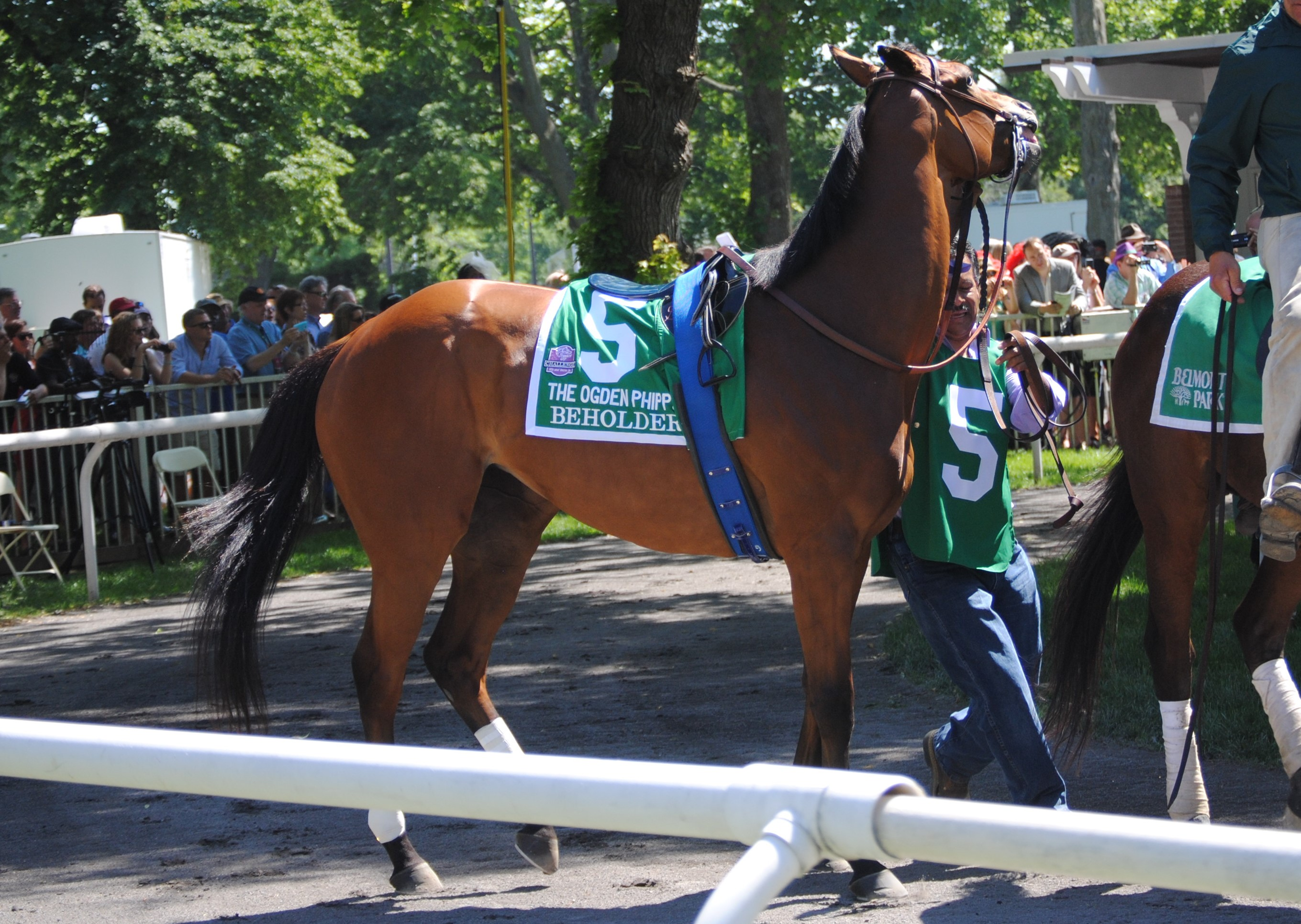
Beholder at the Ogden Phipps

Beholder ran only three races in 2014. She began her third season in the Santa Lucia Stakes at Santa Anita on April 21. Conceding six pounds to her opponents, she started at odds of 1–10 and won by more than five lengths over Legacy. She returned to Grade I competition at the Ogden Phipps Stakes at Belmont on June 7. It was only the second time she had been shipped to race outside California, the only prior trip having been the Kentucky Oaks. Beholder went off as the favorite ahead of Princess of Sylmar and Close Hatches. She raced on the outside and moved up to third on the final turn but made no further progress and finished fourth behind winner Close Hatches. She had sustained an injury during that race, and after returning to training, split the wound site open again during a workout, requiring stitches and missing additional training time. Nevertheless, on September 27, with Mike Smith riding her for the first time, she won the Zenyatta Stakes for a second time, winning by 3/4 of a length over Tiz Midnight and Iotapa. She was viewed as not at her peak fitness but progressing well in spite of the delays in training linked to her injury.

Beholder was prepared to defend her Breeders' Cup Distaff title and was also consigned to be sold at the 2014 Fasig-Tipton fall sale immediately after. Plans changed when she was found to be running a 104°F fever after exercising on October 19. She was scratched from both the race and the sale, and owner Hughes decided that after she recovered from her illness, she would not be sold, but instead would stay in training and return to racing in 2015.

=== 2015: five-year-old season ===
For the second year in a row, Beholder took the Santa Lucia Stakes, run at a distance of 1 1/16 miles (1,700 m) on April 10, 2015. With Stevens returning as her rider, she tracked Uzziel until pulling away for a 3 3/4 length win. "The game was pretty much over going into the first turn and it was sort of a glorified workout, which is something you hope for in a race like this," Stevens said. "She's the best filly I've ever sat on and I'm not sure she's not the best horse I've ever ridden."

After missing the Grade 1 Vanity Stakes and an anticipated match-up with improving Warren's Veneda in May due to a fever similar to that which prevented her from competing in the 2014 Breeders' Cup Distaff, Beholder was given time off. She returned in the Grade III Adoration Stakes on June 13, where she defeated Warren's Veneda by a comfortable 1 1/4 lengths in 1:41.67. Beholder followed up with a win in the Grade I Clement L. Hirsch Stakes, winning by 7 lengths without being touched with the whip. Her behavior had markedly improved as she matured, with Stevens commenting, "She went from being a cantankerous kid to a laid-back grandma." With that victory, she became the first horse since 1976, male or female, to win Grade I stakes races at ages 2, 3, 4, and 5. While other horses had won Grade I stakes four years in a row, she was notable for being the only horse to have done so beginning at age two.

On August 22, 2015, Beholder became the first filly or mare to win the Grade I Pacific Classic against males. She won by 8 1/4 lengths with a final time of 1:59.77, against an otherwise all-male field of nine other horses, including 2014 Breeders' Cup Classic winner Bayern. She won in the third-fastest winning time in the history of the race, and with the second-largest margin of victory, behind the 2013 win of Game On Dude. Hughes said, "She's the first horse who has made me feel lucky to be her owner." Mandella quipped, "We didn’t think she would do it quite like that. We thought it was the girls she was picking on," and added later, "I think the boys pissed her off. I think they were telling sexist jokes on the backside." After the race, her connections announced that she would train with the goal of running in the Breeders' Cup Classic. They also suggested that she might race again in 2016 and that upon retirement, Hughes would be likely to keep her at his Spendthrift Farm and not offer her for sale.

In her last race of 2015, she won the Zenyatta Stakes for the third time, stalking the pace until taking the lead in the homestretch, winning in a field of eight by 3 1/2 lengths. As she prepared for her next race, the 2015 Breeders' Cup Classic, the biggest challenge was anticipated to be her reaction to travel; she had only raced twice outside of California, losing both times, and was known to be a poor shipper. With the 2015 Breeders' Cup races held at Keeneland, and weather causing difficulties for shipping horses by air, Mandella nonetheless declared, "We plan to run in the big one." She shipped to Keeneland on October 19 and developed a slight fever shortly after arrival, thought due to shipping stress, but the fever dropped following treatment and she continued to prep for the race. But on the morning of 29 October, Beholder was sent out for a gallop at the Keeneland training track, and examination after the race revealed that she had bled. She was scratched from the Classic. Mandella explained, "There's obviously some irritated lung tissue there. She will be fine, but if I put her under the pressure of a race situation, it could cause some real damage. This was obviously due to the fever she had when she arrived".

=== 2016: six-year-old season ===
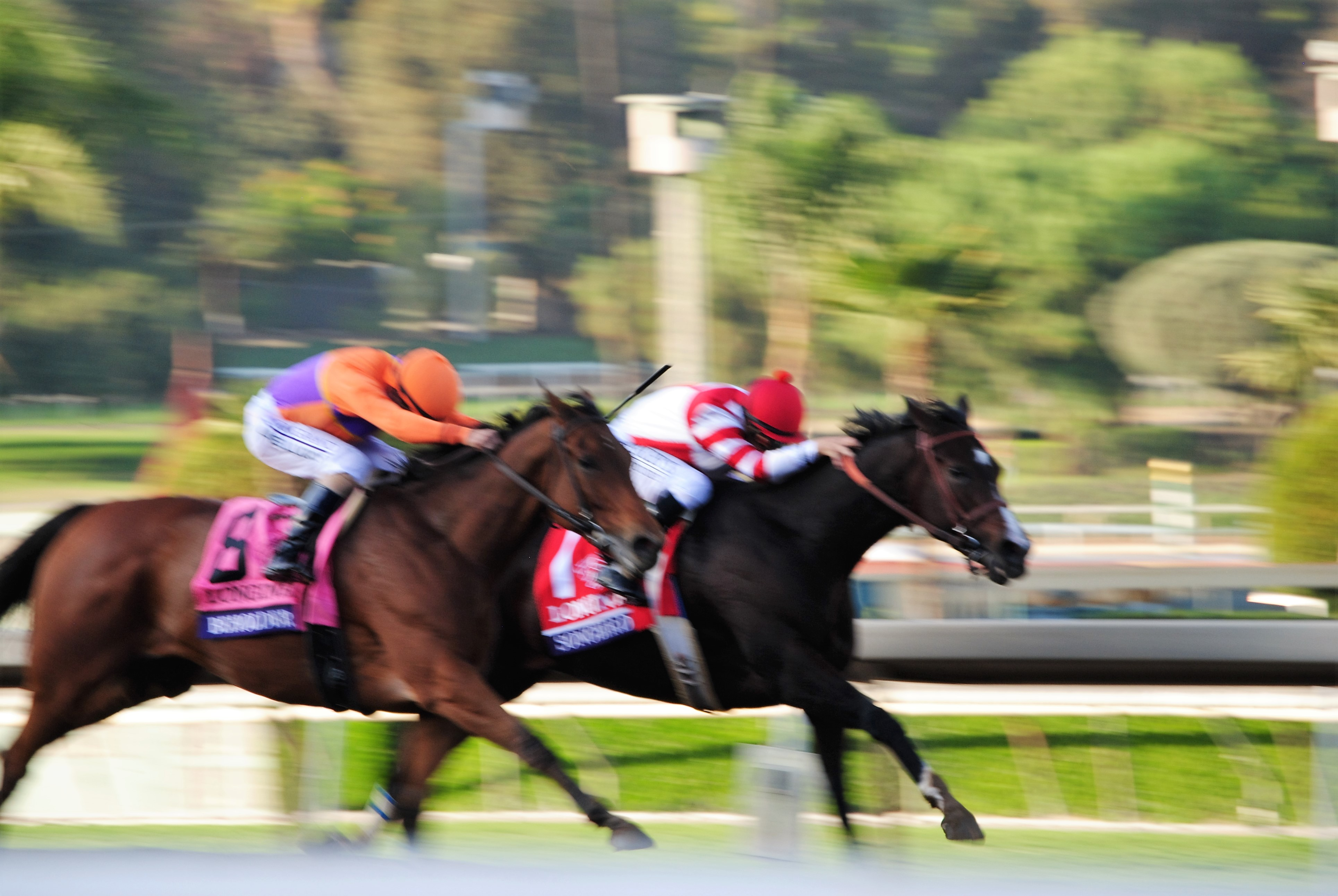
Beholder and Songbird in the stretch run of the Distaff

In her 2016 debut, Stevens was once again in the saddle, and Beholder won the Adoration Stakes for the second time in succession at Santa Anita Park on May 8, the day after the 2016 Kentucky Derby. This was her seventh straight victory in 16 wins overall, of which 14 were stakes wins. On June 4, Beholder appeared to be facing a much sterner task when she took on the 2015 American Champion three-year-old filly Stellar Wind in the Grade I Vanity Mile at Santa Anita. In a slowly run race, Stevens tracked the early leader, Lost Bus, before taking the lead on the turn and winning "effortlessly" by one and a half lengths from Stellar Wind. With this Grade I win, Beholder tied the record of John Henry in winning a Grade I race for five years in a row. However, Stellar Wind turned the tables on Beholder in the 2016 Clement L. Hirsch Stakes, held on July 30, edging Beholder by a half-length in a stretch duel.

Three weeks later, Beholder faced an all-star field in her return to the Pacific Classic on August 20. The field included her first showdown with 2014 horse of the year California Chrome, as well as Dortmund, whose only career defeats had been to California Chrome and American Pharoah. She also faced Imperative and Hoppertunity, both of whom she had defeated in the previous year's race. Beholder was third favorite on the morning line behind California Chrome and Dortmund. California Chrome got the number one post position in the nine-horse field, viewed as an unfavorable draw for him, while Beholder obtained a favorable post at number seven, with Dortmund to her outside. Mandella felt she had trained strongly since her previous loss and was ready to go. Beholder broke cleanly and remained second, stalking California Chrome, who led throughout the entire race. She stalked the pace closely until the mile pole, at which point the stallion pulled ahead of the field and won by five lengths. Beholder finished 2 1/2 lengths ahead of third-place Dortmund. Stevens described her race as a "gutty performance" and Mandella stated, "she ran really good, just second best." Both jockey and trainer expressed respect for the performance of the winner.

In October she started the 2-5 favorite for the Zenyatta Stakes at Santa Anita. After leading for most of the way she was headed in the final furlong and beaten a neck by Stellar Wind with the pair finishing more than eleven lengths clear of the other three runners. On November 4, in what was scheduled to be her final racecourse appearance before her retirement, Beholder made her first appearance in the Breeders' Cup since 2013 when she once again contested the Distaff at Santa Anita. Stellar Wind was again challenging, but the odds-on favorite was the undefeated three-year-old Songbird. Beholder, coming off three losses, was third in the betting odds. From the outside post position of the eight-horse field, Beholder tracked the leaders before moving alongside Songbird on the final turn. The pair engaged in a prolonged struggle in the straight before Beholder prevailed by a scant nose in a photo-finish. Stevens described the race by saying, "I've been in battles before, but never the length of the stretch. . . definitely a quarter of a mile of just a street fight." With her win, she tied Goldikova as one of only two horses to have ever won three Breeders' Cup Championships in the history of the series.

== Honors and legacy ==
Beholder was named American Champion Two-Year-Old Filly at the Eclipse awards for 2012, gaining 225 of the available 254 votes. She won her second Eclipse Award the following year as American Champion Three-Year-Old Filly with 207 votes against 42 for runner-up Princess of Sylmar. In the awards for 2014, in spite of her abbreviated season, she still received five votes for American Champion Older Female, though the award that year went to Close Hatches by a wide margin. Beholder won her third Eclipse Award when she was named the 2015 American Champion Older Dirt Female Horse, taking 256 of the 261 votes. She repeated in this category in 2016, receiving 246 out of 248 votes. "You think about other sports and think about people in the Hall of Fame, and very often they have careers where they were good over a long period of time or brilliant over a shorter period of time," said Ned Toffey, the manager of Spendthrift Farm. "She did both. She was brilliant over a long period of time."

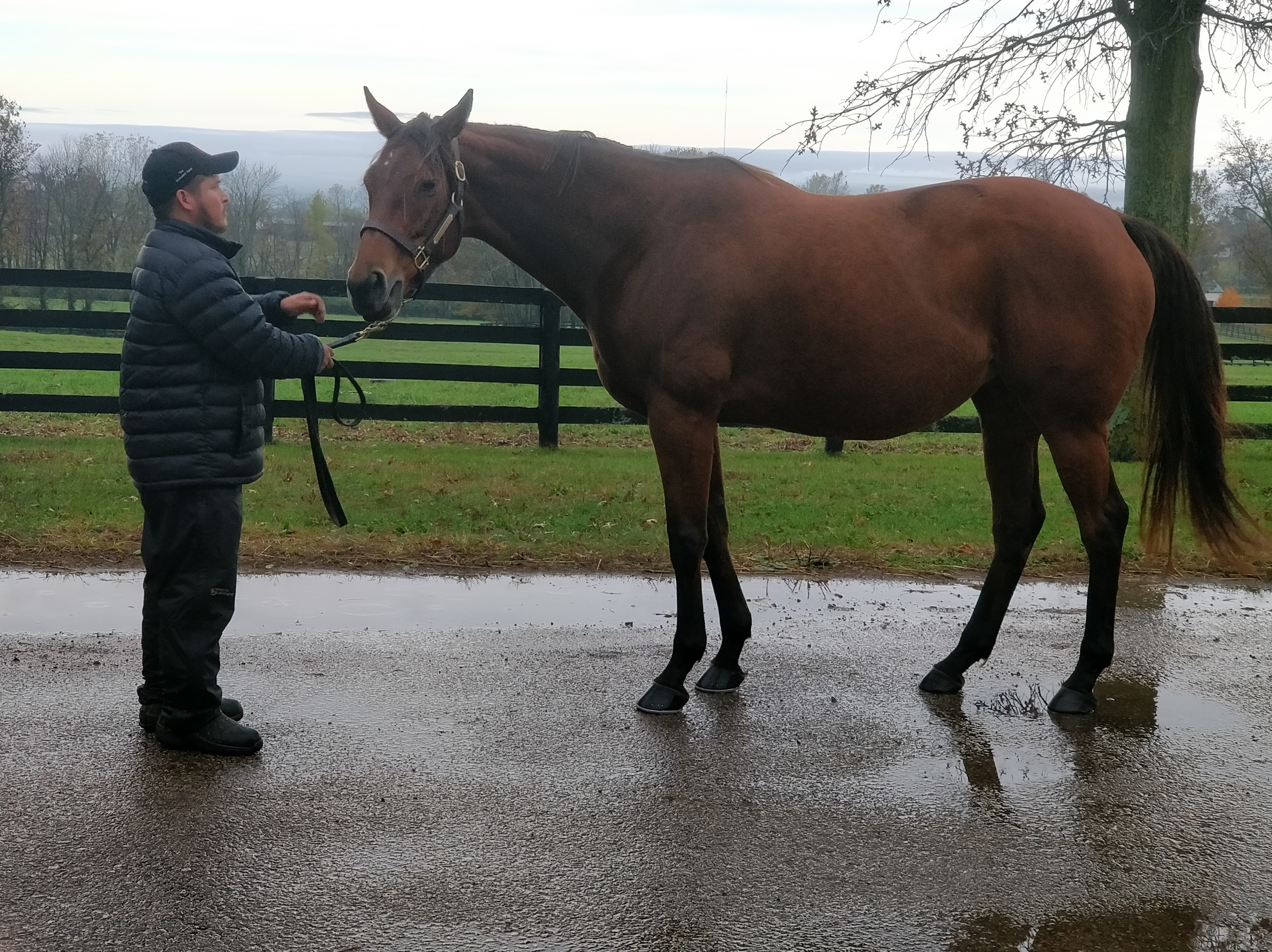
Beholder in retirement at Spendthrift Farms.

In the 2013 World's Best Racehorse Rankings, Beholder received a rating of 121, ranking her as the second-best three-year-old filly in the world behind the French-trained Treve, and the thirty-eighth best horse in the world of any age or either sex. In 2015, she received a rating of 123 following her Pacific Classic win, placing her in a tie for eighth worldwide and second only to Treve as the highest-rated filly or mare. In 2016, she again received a rating of 123, tying her for tenth worldwide and second to Winx as the highest rated mare.

Beholder was retired at the conclusion of the 2016 season. On February 10, 2017, Santa Anita announced that it was renaming the Vanity Stakes, which she won in 2016, as the Beholder Mile Stakes, noting that she won 14 races at Santa Anita during her career, including three Breeders' Cup victories.

In retirement, as of 2024 she has had four of her foals go to the track. The most notable winner to date is Tamara, who won the 2023 Grade I Del Mar Debutante Stakes, before being sidelined by an injury. Her 2022 foal by Curlin, a colt, sold in 2023 as a yearling for $4 million

In her first year of eligibility, Beholder was elected to the National Museum of Racing and Hall of Fame as part of the class of 2022.

== Statistics ==
Date	Age	Distance *	Race	Grade	Track	Odds	Time	Field	Finish	Margin	Jockey	Trainer	Owner	Ref
Jun 28, 2012	2	5 1/2 furlongs	Maiden Special Weight	Maiden	Hollywood Park	21.80	NA	9	4	NA	Garrett Gomez	Richard Mandella	Spendthrift Farm	
Jul 22, 2012	2	5 1/2 furlongs	Maiden Special Weight	Maiden	Del Mar	2.30	1:03.78	9	1	3 1/4 lengths	Garrett Gomez	Richard Mandella	Spendthrift Farm	
Sep 1, 2012	2	7 furlongs	Del Mar Debutante Stakes	I	Del Mar	8.10	NA	8	2	nose	Garrett Gomez	Richard Mandella	Spendthrift Farm	
Oct 4, 2012	2	6 furlongs	Allowance	Allowance	Santa Anita	0.60	1:09.00	6	1	11 lengths	Garrett Gomez	Richard Mandella	Spendthrift Farm	
Nov 2, 2012	2	8 1/2 furlongs	Breeders' Cup Juvenile Fillies	I	Santa Anita	3.9	1:43.61	8	1	1 length	Garrett Gomez	Richard Mandella	Spendthrift Farm	
Jan 21, 2013	3	6 1/2 furlongs	Santa Ynez Stakes	II	Santa Anita	0.2	NA	7	2	3/4 lengths	Garrett Gomez	Richard Mandella	Spendthrift Farm	
Mar 2, 2013	3	8 furlongs	Las Virgenes Stakes	I	Santa Anita	0.8	1:36.14	8	1	3 3/4 lengths	Garrett Gomez	Richard Mandella	Spendthrift Farm	
Apr 6, 2013	3	8 1/2 furlongs	Santa Anita Oaks	I	Santa Anita	0.3	1:43.16	6	1	2 3/4 lengths	Garrett Gomez	Richard Mandella	Spendthrift Farm	
May 3, 2013	3	9 furlongs	Kentucky Oaks	I	Churchill Downs	9.0	NA	10	2	1/2 length	Garrett Gomez	Richard Mandella	Spendthrift Farm	
Sep 1, 2013	3	8 furlongs	Torrey Pines Stakes	III	Del Mar	0.10	1:36.30	5	1	2 3/4 lengths	Gary Stevens	Richard Mandella	Spendthrift Farm	
Sep 28, 2013	3	8 1/2 furlongs	Zenyatta Stakes	I	Santa Anita	1.60	1:42.11	7	1	1 1/4 lengths	Gary Stevens	Richard Mandella	Spendthrift Farm	
Nov 1, 2013	3	9 furlongs	Breeders' Cup Distaff	I	Santa Anita	2.80	1:47.77	6	1	4 1/4 lengths	Gary Stevens	Richard Mandella	Spendthrift Farm	
Apr 20, 2014	4	8 1/2 furlongs	Santa Lucia Stakes	Listed Stakes	Santa Anita	0.10	1:42.67	5	1	5 1/4 lengths	Gary Stevens	Richard Mandella	Spendthrift Farm	
Jun 7, 2014	4	8 1/2 furlongs	Ogden Phipps Stakes	I	Belmont Park	1.00	NA	6	4	NA	Gary Stevens	Richard Mandella	Spendthrift Farm	
Sep 27, 2014	4	8 1/2 furlongs	Zenyatta Stakes	I	Santa Anita	0.40	1:42.19	5	1	3/4 lengths	Mike E. Smith	Richard Mandella	Spendthrift Farm	
Apr 10, 2015	5	8 1/2 furlongs	Santa Lucia Stakes	Listed Stakes	Santa Anita	0.10	1:42.54	5	1	3 1/4 lengths	Gary Stevens	Richard Mandella	Spendthrift Farm	
Jun 13, 2015	5	8 1/2 furlongs	Adoration Stakes	III	Santa Anita	0.20	1:41.67	6	1	1 1/4 lengths	Gary Stevens	Richard Mandella	Spendthrift Farm	
Aug 1, 2015	5	8 1/2 furlongs	Clement L. Hirsch Stakes	I	Del Mar	0.30	1:43.81	8	1	7 lengths	Gary Stevens	Richard Mandella	Spendthrift Farm	
Aug 22, 2015	5	10 furlongs	Pacific Classic Stakes	I	Del Mar	0.80	1:59.77	10	1	8 lengths	Gary Stevens	Richard Mandella	Spendthrift Farm	
Sep 26, 2015	5	8 1/2 furlongs	Zenyatta Stakes	I	Santa Anita	0.40	1:42.83	8	1	3 3/4 lengths	Gary Stevens	Richard Mandella	Spendthrift Farm	
May 8, 2016	6	8 1/2 furlongs	Adoration Stakes	III	Santa Anita	0.05	1:42.73	6	1	2 1/2 lengths	Gary Stevens	Richard Mandella	Spendthrift Farm	
Jun 4, 2016	6	8 furlongs	Vanity Mile	I	Santa Anita	0.20	1:35.97	5	1	1 1/2 lengths	Gary Stevens	Richard Mandella	Spendthrift Farm	
Jul 30, 2016	6	8 1/2 furlongs	Clement L. Hirsch Stakes	I	Del Mar	0.10	NA	5	2	1/2 lengths	Gary Stevens	Richard Mandella	Spendthrift Farm	
Aug 20, 2016	6	10 furlongs	Pacific Classic Stakes	I	Del Mar	3.00	NA	9	2	1/2 lengths	Gary Stevens	Richard Mandella	Spendthrift Farm	
Oct 1, 2016	6	8 1/2 furlongs	Zenyatta Stakes	I	Santa Anita	0.40	NA	5	2	neck	Gary Stevens	Richard Mandella	Spendthrift Farm	
Nov 4, 2016	6	9 furlongs	Breeders' Cup Distaff	I	Santa Anita	3.30	1:49.20	8	1	nose	Gary Stevens	Richard Mandella	Spendthrift Farm	

* Conversion of race distances
Furlongs	Miles	Meters
5 1/2	11/16	1,106
6	3/4	1,207
6 1/2	13/16	1,308
7	7/8	1,408
8	1	1,609
8 1/2	1 1/16	1,710
9	1 1/8	1,811
9 1/2	1 3/16	1,911
10	1 1/4	2,012
12	1 1/2	2,414

== Pedigree ==
Pedigree of Beholder, bay filly, 2010
Sire Henny Hughes (USA) 2003	Hennessy (USA); 1993	Storm Cat	Storm Bird
Sire Henny Hughes (USA) 2003	Hennessy (USA); 1993	Storm Cat	Terlingua
Sire Henny Hughes (USA) 2003	Hennessy (USA); 1993	Island Kitty	Hawaii
Sire Henny Hughes (USA) 2003	Hennessy (USA); 1993	Island Kitty	T C Kitten
Sire Henny Hughes (USA) 2003	Meadow Flyer (USA); 1989	Meadow Lake	Hold Your Peace
Sire Henny Hughes (USA) 2003	Meadow Flyer (USA); 1989	Meadow Lake	Suspicious Native
Sire Henny Hughes (USA) 2003	Meadow Flyer (USA); 1989	Shortley	Hagley
Sire Henny Hughes (USA) 2003	Meadow Flyer (USA); 1989	Shortley	Short Winded
Dam Leslie's Lady (USA) 1996	Tricky Creek (USA); 1986	Clever Trick	Icecapade
Dam Leslie's Lady (USA) 1996	Tricky Creek (USA); 1986	Clever Trick	Kankakee Miss
Dam Leslie's Lady (USA) 1996	Tricky Creek (USA); 1986	Battle Creek Girl	His Majesty
Dam Leslie's Lady (USA) 1996	Tricky Creek (USA); 1986	Battle Creek Girl	Far Beyond
Dam Leslie's Lady (USA) 1996	Crystal Lady (CAN); 1990	Stop The Music	Hail To Reason
Dam Leslie's Lady (USA) 1996	Crystal Lady (CAN); 1990	Stop The Music	Bebopper
Dam Leslie's Lady (USA) 1996	Crystal Lady (CAN); 1990	One Last Bird	One For All
Dam Leslie's Lady (USA) 1996	Crystal Lady (CAN); 1990	One Last Bird	Last Bird (Family:23-b)
