= Princess of Sylmar =

American-bred Thoroughbred racehorse

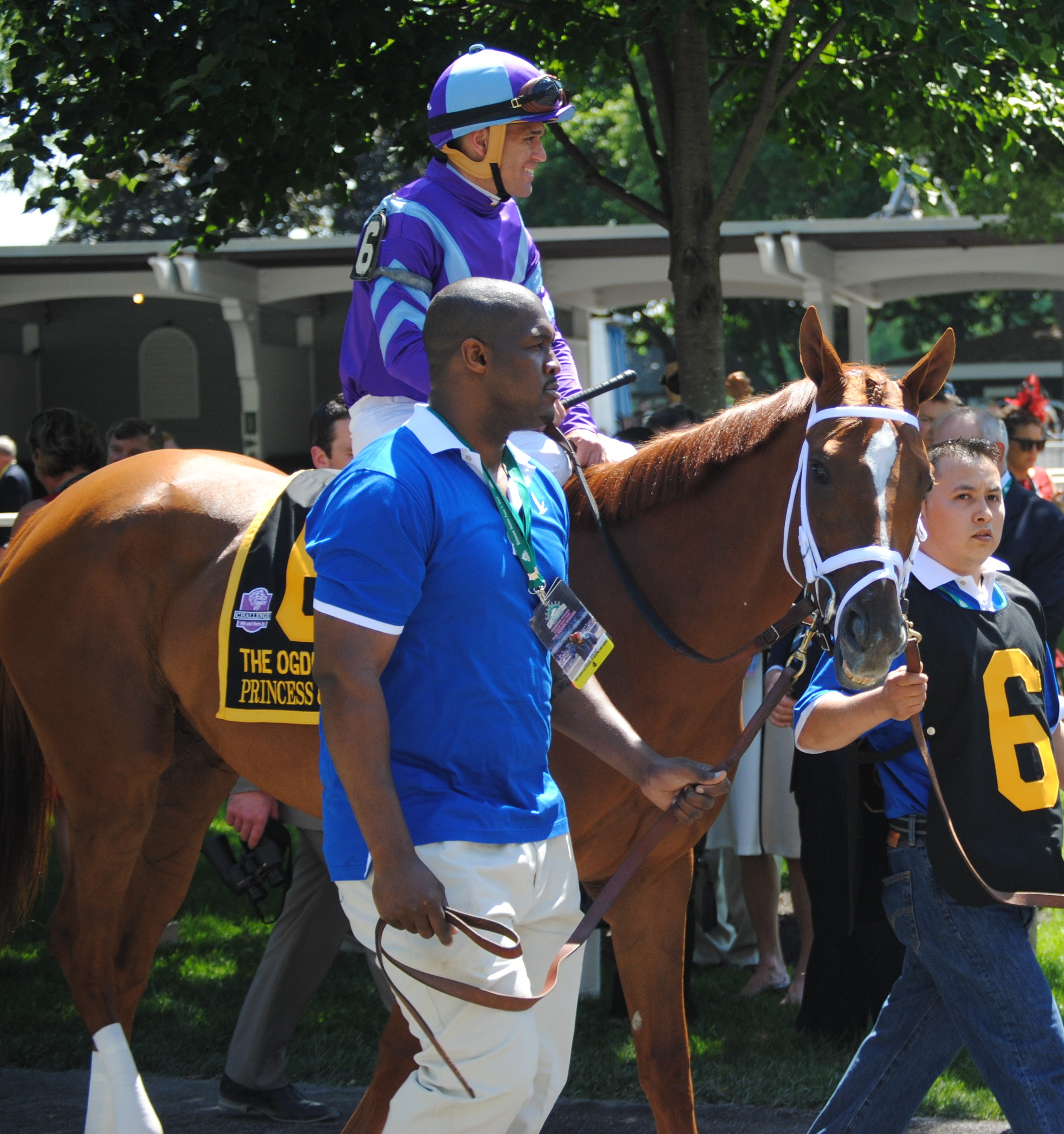
- Princess of Sylmar in the walking ring for the 2014 Ogden Phipps
- Sire: Majestic Warrior
- Grandsire: A.P. Indy
- Dam: Storm Dixie
- Damsire: Catienus
- Sex: Filly
- Foaled: 27 March 2010
- Country: United States
- Colour: Chestnut
- Breeder: Ed Stanco
- Owner: King of Prussia Stable
- Trainer: Todd Pletcher
- Record: 14: 9-3-0
- Earnings: $1,852,220

Major wins
- Busanda Stakes 2013; Busher Stakes (2013); Kentucky Oaks (2013); Coaching Club American Oaks (2013); Alabama Stakes (2013); Beldame Stakes (2013)

Princess of Sylmar (foaled 27 March 2010) is an American-bred Thoroughbred racehorse. In 2013 she appeared to have established herself as the leading American filly of her generation with Grade I wins in the Kentucky Oaks, Coaching Club American Oaks and Alabama Stakes.

== Background ==
Princess of Sylmar is a chestnut filly with a narrow white blaze bred in Pennsylvania by Ed Stanco. She is from the first crop of foals sired by Majestic Warrior, a son of A.P. Indy whose biggest win came in the 2007 Hopeful Stakes. He stood in 2012 at the Ashford Stud in Kentucky at a fee of $12,000. Princess of Sylmar is the first foal of her dam Storm Dixie, who won one minor race in ten starts. The filly is named after the Sylmar Farm in Christiana, Pennsylvania, where she was foaled: the farm's name came from the fact that its owner had previously operated from a street which was on the border of PennSYLvania and MARyland. Princess of Sylmar raced in the colors of Ed Stanco's King of Prussia Stable and was trained by Todd Pletcher.

== Racing career ==
=== 2012: two-year-old season ===
Princess of Sylmar began her racing career at Penn National Race Course in the autumn of 2012. On October 12 she finished fourth in a maiden race over five and a half furlongs before being moved up in distance for another maiden race on November 8. Ridden by Kendrick Carmouche, she drew clear of her opponents in the straight to win easily by 19 lengths. In December she moved to Aqueduct Race Track and was ridden by Rajiv Maragh in an allowance race which she won by five lengths, conceding weight to her four rivals.

=== 2013: three-year-old season ===
Princess of Sylmar remained at Aqueduct in the early part of 2013. On January 5, she started 19/20 favorite for the Busanda Stakes in which she was ridden by Christopher DeCarlo. She tracked the leaders before taking the lead in the straight and drawing away to win by seven and a half lengths from the subsequently disqualified Ruby Lips. A month later she started the 1:4 favorite for the Busher Stakes. Ridden by Javier Castellano, she took the lead on the final turn and won very easily by seven lengths from Kelli Got Frosty. In April Princess of Sylmar was moved up in class to contest the Gazelle Stakes in which she was matched against the previously undefeated filly Close Hatches. Castellano moved Princess of Sylmar up to challenge Close Hatches just after half way and the fillies raced side by side until the straight, when Close Hatches pulled away to win by three and a quarter lengths.

On 3 May, Princess of Sylmar started a 39:1 outsider for the Kentucky Oaks over nine furlongs at Churchill Downs. Her opponents included Close Hatches, Beholder (winner of the Breeders' Cup Juvenile Fillies) and Dreaming of Julia, who had won the Gulfstream Oaks by more than twenty lengths. Ridden by the veteran Mike Smith, Princess of Sylmar was hampered shortly after the start and was not among the early leaders, but made steady progress to turn into the straight in fourth place. Switched to the outside, she produced a strong late run to overtake Beholder 60 yards from the finish and win by half a length. After the race Pletcher said that he was "pleasantly surprised with her effort and her win. She's a good filly; we knew that all along."

On July 20, Princess of Sylmar, ridden by Castellano, started at odds of 43/20 for the Coaching Club American Oaks over nine furlongs at Saratoga Race Course. The favorite was Unlimited Budget, also trained by Pletcher, who had finished third in the Kentucky Oaks before running sixth behind Palace Malice in the Belmont Stakes. Princess of Sylmar was restrained at the back of the field before moving up on the outside on the turn into the straight. She went clear of the field and won by six lengths from My Happy Face, with Unlimited Budget finishing last of the five runners. Pletcher felt that the filly had not been given credit for her previous win saying: "I think everyone kind of lost sight of the fact that going into the Kentucky Oaks, it was billed as the best Oaks we've seen in 25 years; this filly wins it and gets virtually no respect. I think today she put herself at the top of the leader board, and now everyone understands that the Kentucky Oaks was a real race."

At the same track four weeks later, Princess of Sylmar was matched against the Black-Eyed Susan Stakes winner Fiftyshadesofhay in Saratoga's Alabama Stakes. As in her previous start, the filly, under Castellano, tracked the leaders before taking the lead on the far turn. She went clear in the straight and won comfortably by two and a half lengths from Fiftyshadesofhay. With this win, she completed two of the three races that constitute the reconfigured American Triple Tiara of Thoroughbred Racing. Commenting on the winner's performance, Castellano said; "She's an amazing horse. Everything we've asked, she has responded so well so far". Pletcher declined to commit the filly to any future targets after Stanco suggested that she might not race again in 2013. Princess of Sylmar's win was regarded as having confirmed her status as the year's outstanding three-year-old filly in North America. Nonetheless, on September 28, Princess of Sylmar teamed again with Castellano for the Beldame Stakes at Belmont Park in which she was matched against older fillies and mares including Royal Delta. Princess of Sylmar moved alongside Royal Delta at the top of the stretch before drawing away to win by two lengths.

On October 19, 2013, in spite of earlier denials, her connections changed their minds about running her in additional races and confirmed that she would ship west to compete in the Breeders' Cup Distaff. The race attracted a very strong field including Royal Delta, Beholder and Close Hatches: Princess of Sylmar, ridden by Castellano, was made the 13/5 second favorite. She failed to reproduce her earlier form and was beaten before the turn into the straight, finishing last of the six runners, with Beholder winning the race.

=== 2014: four-year-old season ===
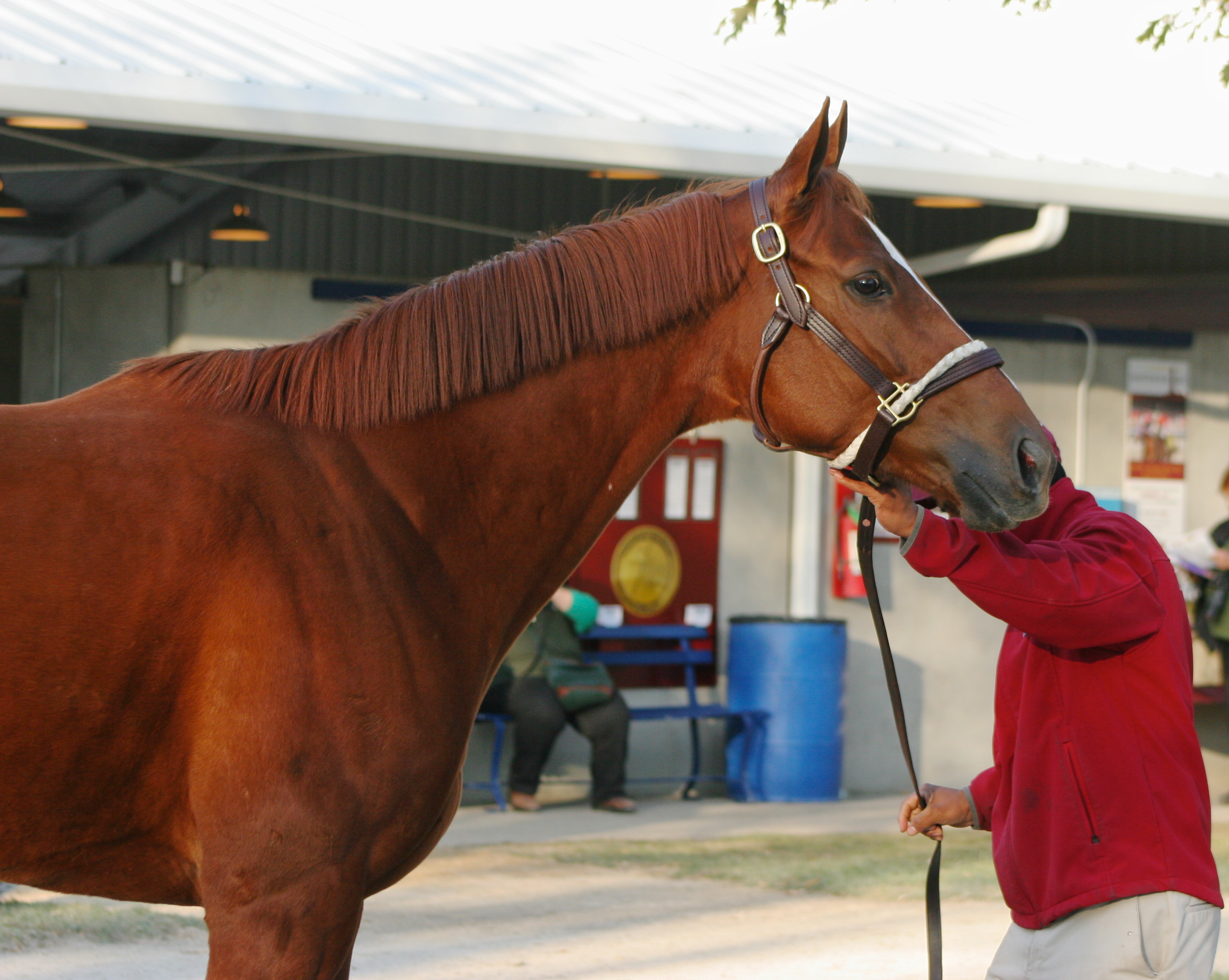
Princess of Sylmar at the 2014 Fasig-Tipton auction.

Princess of Sylmar began her third season in the Cat Cay Stakes over a mile at Aqueduct in April. She started the 3/5 favorite against four opponents and won by three and a half lengths from Wedding Toast. The filly was then off the course for two months before returning in Grade I Ogden Phipps Stakes at Belmont on June 7 in which she was matched against Beholder and Close Hatches. She was held up by Castellano in the early stages before moving forward on the final turn when she was forced to the outside. She made strong progress in the closing stages but failed by a head to run down Close Hatches. A month later, Princess of Sylmar started 1/5 favourite for the Delaware Handicap but was unable to catch the front-running Belle Gallantey and finished second, beaten two and three quarter lengths.

After a fifth-place finish in the Personal Ensign Stakes in August, 2014, Princess of Sylmar developed a case of the "thumps", an irregular spasming of the diaphragm, usually caused by abnormal electrolyte imbalance, and the decision was made to retire her. She was offered as a broodmare prospect at the Fasig-Tipton November sale in Lexington, Kentucky and was sold for $3.1 million to Shadai Farm in Japan. She had a filly by Deep Impact in 2016 and a colt by the same sire in 2017.

== Pedigree ==
Pedigree of Princess of Sylmar, chestnut mare, 2010
Sire Majestic Warrior (USA) 2005	A.P. Indy (USA); 1989	Seattle Slew	Bold Reasoning
Sire Majestic Warrior (USA) 2005	A.P. Indy (USA); 1989	Seattle Slew	My Charmer
Sire Majestic Warrior (USA) 2005	A.P. Indy (USA); 1989	Weekend Surprise	Secretariat
Sire Majestic Warrior (USA) 2005	A.P. Indy (USA); 1989	Weekend Surprise	Lassie Dear
Sire Majestic Warrior (USA) 2005	Dream Supreme (USA); 1997	Seeking the Gold	Mr. Prospector
Sire Majestic Warrior (USA) 2005	Dream Supreme (USA); 1997	Seeking the Gold	Con Game
Sire Majestic Warrior (USA) 2005	Dream Supreme (USA); 1997	Spinning Round	Dixieland Band
Sire Majestic Warrior (USA) 2005	Dream Supreme (USA); 1997	Spinning Round	Take Heart
Dam Storm Dixie (USA) 2004	Catienus (USA); 1994	Storm Cat	Storm Bird
Dam Storm Dixie (USA) 2004	Catienus (USA); 1994	Storm Cat	Terlingua
Dam Storm Dixie (USA) 2004	Catienus (USA); 1994	Diamond City	Mr. Prospector
Dam Storm Dixie (USA) 2004	Catienus (USA); 1994	Diamond City	Honey's Flag
Dam Storm Dixie (USA) 2004	Golden Wave Band (USA); 1988	Dixieland Band	Northern Dancer
Dam Storm Dixie (USA) 2004	Golden Wave Band (USA); 1988	Dixieland Band	Mississippi Mud
Dam Storm Dixie (USA) 2004	Golden Wave Band (USA); 1988	Wind Talker	Drone
Dam Storm Dixie (USA) 2004	Golden Wave Band (USA); 1988	Wind Talker	Chic Chuck (Family:22-d)

- Princess of Sylmar is inbred 3 x 4 to Dixieland Band, meaning that this stallion appears in both the third and fourth generations of her pedigree. She is also inbred 4 x 4 to Mr. Prospector.
