= In Lingerie =

American-bred Thoroughbred racehorse

- Sire: Empire Maker
- Grandsire: Unbridled
- Dam: Cat Chat
- Damsire: Storm Cat
- Sex: Mare
- Foaled: 2009
- Country: United States
- Colour: Bay
- Breeder: Colts Neck Stables, LLC
- Owner: Eclipse Thoroughbred Partners and Gary Barber
- Trainer: Todd A. Pletcher
- Record: 8: 4-2-1
- Earnings: $712,265

Major wins
- Black-Eyed Susan Stakes (2012); Bourbonette Oaks (2012); Spinster Stakes (2012)
- Last updated on Oct 7, 2012

In Lingerie (foaled in April 2009 in Kentucky) is an American Thoroughbred racehorse. She won three of her first four outings. The daughter of Empire Maker is known for posting a 1-1/2 length score over her stablemate Disposablepleasure in the mile and an eighth Grade II $300,000 Black-Eyed Susan Stakes at Pimlico Race Course on May 18, 2012.

== Early racing career ==
Trained by Todd Pletcher, In Lingerie did not race as a two-year-old. When she hit the track in mid-January 2012, she won her debut in a maiden special weight race at Turfway Park at six furlongs on synthetic surface. In her second start, she came in a close second in an optional claimer on the Gulfstream Park dirt in late February. In her third start, In Lingerie stepped up in class and won by six lengths in the $100,000 Bourbonette Oaks at one mile for 3-year-old fillies at Turfway Park. The race was the top race for fillies on the Spiral Stakes undercard held on Saturday, March 24, 2012. In Lingerie put away all challengers coming off the second turn, including her stablemate Dancing Solo.

== Black-Eyed Susan Stakes ==
Her connections, including owner Eclipse Thoroughbred Partners and trainer Todd Pletcher, skipped the Kentucky Oaks with In Lingerie to give her more time off. They decided two weeks before the Oaks that they would enter her in the second jewel of America's de facto Filly Triple Crown: the $300,000 Grade II Black-eyed Susan Stakes.

The Black-Eyed Susan Stakes is the distaff counterpart to the Preakness Stakes and was run on the Friday of Preakness Stakes weekend before a crowd of 32,473. A field of nine three-year-old fillies went to the gate in this one and one eighth mile feature race. Undefeated Momma Kimbo, winner of the Fantasy Stakes last time out, was sent off as the even-money favorite over 3-1 second choice Welcome Guest. In Lingerie stumbled badly at the break, cutting herself and bleeding from one of her front feet. The two favorites shot to the lead early while In Lingerie ran seventh passing the stands for the first time. Momma Kimbo took an uncontested lead of two lengths half through fractions of 23.5, 47.4, with stablemate Disposablepleasure in fourth going into the clubhouse turn.

Entering the final turn, In Lingerie moved up into a stalking position in fifth place five lengths behind the lead as she went five wide. As the field reached the top of the stretch, she moved up to third while racing six wide. At the eighth pole, she drew even with the leaders, Momma Kimbo and Wildcat Smile. With 110 yards left, Momma Kimbo fell out of contention, and In Lingerie moved in front of Wildcat Smile by a length. Then her stablemate Disposablepleasure made a late charge, closing fast. However, with jockey John Velazquez aboard, In Lingerie won by a length and a half, paying $9.80.

== Late racing career ==
On July 21, 2012, In Lingerie finished third to Questing and Zo Impressive in the $300,000 Grade I Coaching Club American Oaks at one and one eighth miles at Saratoga Race Course.

On October 7, 2012, In Lingerie was entered in the $500,000 Spinster Stakes at Keeneland Race Course in Lexington, Kentucky. On that day she went into the race as the 2-1 favorite. In Lingerie broke fourth from the starting gate under jockey John Velazquez and stayed in that position through the first three quarters of a mile. She covered 1-1/8 miles over Keeneland's Polytrack surface in 1:49.42. She veered outside of traffic going five wide and responded with a burst at the sixteenth pole and went on to win the race by two and a quarter lengths over Mystic Star.

On November 2, 2012, In Lingerie was entered into the $2,000,000 Grade 1 Breeders' Cup Filly & Mare Turf at Santa Anita Park in Arcadia, California. The race was run at 1 1/4 miles on firm grass and she just did not handle the track that day. In that race In Lingerie performed poorly, finishing ninth out of the field of twelve.

In November 2012 after the Breeders Cup, the connections of In Lingerie announced that she would retire and start breeding in 2013. She was sold at auction for $2.2 million at the Fasig-Tipton Auction in November 2012. Her first contract was to be bred with Champion Frankel in February 2013.

== Pedigree ==
Pedigree of In Lingerie
Sire Empire Maker dk br 2000	Unbridled bay 1987	Fappiano	Mr. Prospector
Sire Empire Maker dk br 2000	Unbridled bay 1987	Fappiano	Killaloe
Sire Empire Maker dk br 2000	Unbridled bay 1987	Gana Facil	Le Fabuleux
Sire Empire Maker dk br 2000	Unbridled bay 1987	Gana Facil	Charedi
Sire Empire Maker dk br 2000	Toussaud dk br 1989	El Gran Senor	Northern Dancer
Sire Empire Maker dk br 2000	Toussaud dk br 1989	El Gran Senor	Sex Appeal
Sire Empire Maker dk br 2000	Toussaud dk br 1989	Image of Reality	In Reality
Sire Empire Maker dk br 2000	Toussaud dk br 1989	Image of Reality	Edee's Image
Dam Cat Chat bay 1998	Storm Cat br 1983	Storm Bird	Northern Dancer
Dam Cat Chat bay 1998	Storm Cat br 1983	Storm Bird	South Ocean
Dam Cat Chat bay 1998	Storm Cat br 1983	Terlingua	Secretariat
Dam Cat Chat bay 1998	Storm Cat br 1983	Terlingua	Crimson Saint
Dam Cat Chat bay 1998	Phone Chatter ches 1991	Phone Trick	Clever Trick
Dam Cat Chat bay 1998	Phone Chatter ches 1991	Phone Trick	Over the Phone
Dam Cat Chat bay 1998	Phone Chatter ches 1991	Passing My Way	Pass the Glass
Dam Cat Chat bay 1998	Phone Chatter ches 1991	Passing My Way	Hooplah
