= Panty Raid (horse) =

American-bred Thoroughbred racehorse (2004–2025)

- Sire: Include
- Grandsire: Broad Brush
- Dam: Adventurous Di
- Damsire: Private Account
- Sex: Mare
- Foaled: March 8, 2004; Kentucky, U.S.
- Died: February 26, 2025 (aged 20)
- Country: United States
- Colour: Dark bay or brown
- Breeder: Heaven Trees Farm
- Owner: Glencrest Farm
- Trainer: Todd Pletcher
- Record: 10: 5-2-1
- Earnings: $1,052,380

Major wins
- Black-Eyed Susan Stakes (2007); Spinster Stakes (2007); American Oaks (2007)

Panty Raid (March 8, 2004 – February 26, 2025) was an American Thoroughbred racehorse who was A grade I winner on dirt and turf and was a millionaire daughter of Include who raced for the Greathouse family's Glencrest Farm and Dan Taylor. Panty Raid was nominated for an Eclipse Award for the American Champion Three-Year-Old Filly in 2007 but finished a close third behind Octave. Both Octave and Panty Raid finished behind in the voting to champion Rags to Riches. Panty Raid will best be remembered for her stirring victory in the Grade II $200,000 Black-Eyed Susan Stakes on May 19, 2007.

== Early career ==
Glencrest bought Panty Raid for $275,000 at the 2006 Keeneland April sale of 2-year-olds in training from Niall Brennan Stables, agent. Panty Raid was the daughter of Pimlico Special Handicap winner Include, produced from the stakes-placed Private Account mare Adventurous Di.

== Three-year-old season ==
Panty Raid started her sophomore season with two strong performances but missed the winners circle twice as she placed in the grade two Falls City Handicap at Churchill Downs at nine furlongs and the grade three Bourbonette Oaks at Turfway Park at one mile.

In May her connections decided to enter her in the second jewel of America's de facto Filly Triple Crown, the $250,000 grade two Black-Eyed Susan Stakes. Panty Raid was the second choice at 5–2 on the morning line in a strong field of eight stakes winners. After breaking cleanly from post two in a field of three-year-old fillies, Panty Raid saved ground around both turns riding close to the rail of the 1-1/8-mile race. At the top of the stretch Panty Raid angled out for the drive. Baroness Thatcher, ridden by Garrett Gomez, clung grimly to the lead as she passed the furlong pole, but she was no match for the steady run of Panty Raid, who prevailed by a length over Winning Point, the 3-1 third choice. Baroness Thatcher, the 8-5 favorite, was another neck back in third. Panty Raid's romp on ESPN's national TV broadcast on the Preakness undercard enhanced her reputation greatly and moved her to the top of her age group.

Panty Raid accomplished a rarity last year for a 3-year-old filly. She beat older fillies and mares in both the grade one American Oaks Invitational on the turf at Hollywood Park and the grade one Juddmonte Spinster Stakes at Keeneland on the polytrack. She has won on dirt, turf and synthetics at distances ranging from six furlongs to 10 furlongs, and had won four of her last five starts overall previous to the Breeders' Cup.

== Retirement ==
Panty Raid was retired from racing because of a torn suspensory ligament on May 27, 2008, during her 4-year-old season. She arrived May 29 of that year at Glencrest near Midway, Ky. to begin her broodmare career.

Her named foals are as follows:

- Hunting Ground, bay gelding by Street Cry (IRE), foaled March 1, 2010. Has won five of 27 starts as of May 2017.
- Theros, dark bay or brown gelding by Pulpit, foaled March 18, 2011. Has won two of six starts and has not raced since 2015.
- Interception, bay gelding by Distorted Humor, foaled April 9, 2012. Unraced.
- Pannonia, bay filly by Street Cry (IRE), foaled May 4, 2014. Unraced.
- Arcaro, grey or roan filly by Tapit, foaled February 12, 2016. finished third in their lone start
- Micheline, bay filly by Bernardini, foaled March 4 2017, won five of 18 starts won the G2 Hillsborough Stakes and placed in the Grade 1 Queen Elizabeth II Challenge Cup Stakes.
- Proxy, bay colt by Tapit, foaled April 25 2018, won six of 20 starts, won the Grade 1 Clark Stakes, Grade 2 Oaklawn Handicap, Grade 3 Monmouth Cup, and finished third in the Breeders Cup Classic
- Out in Force, grey or roan gelding by Frosted, foaled February 17 2021, unraced.
- Rush Week, bay filly by Into Mischief, foaled May 10 2022, finished sixth in lone start.

Panty Raid was euthanized on February 26, 2025, at the age of 20.

== Pedigree ==
Pedigree of Panty Raid, dark bay or brown mare, foaled March 8, 2004
Sire Include b. 1997	Broad Brush br. 1983	Ack Ack b. 1966	Battle Joined
Sire Include b. 1997	Broad Brush br. 1983	Ack Ack b. 1966	Fast Turn
Sire Include b. 1997	Broad Brush br. 1983	Hay Patcher b. 1973	Hoist The Flag
Sire Include b. 1997	Broad Brush br. 1983	Hay Patcher b. 1973	Turn To Talent
Sire Include b. 1997	Illeria b. 1987	Stop The Music b. 1970	Hail To Reason
Sire Include b. 1997	Illeria b. 1987	Stop The Music b. 1970	Bebopper
Sire Include b. 1997	Illeria b. 1987	Baldski's Holiday b. 1981	Baldski
Sire Include b. 1997	Illeria b. 1987	Baldski's Holiday b. 1981	Verset Holiday
Dam Adventurous Di b. 1990	Private Account b. 1976	Damascus b. 1964	Sword Dancer
Dam Adventurous Di b. 1990	Private Account b. 1976	Damascus b. 1964	Kerala
Dam Adventurous Di b. 1990	Private Account b. 1976	Numbered Account b. 1969	Buckpasser
Dam Adventurous Di b. 1990	Private Account b. 1976	Numbered Account b. 1969	Intriguing
Dam Adventurous Di b. 1990	Tamaral b. 1983	Seattle Slew dkb/br. 1974	Bold Reasoning
Dam Adventurous Di b. 1990	Tamaral b. 1983	Seattle Slew dkb/br. 1974	My Charmer
Dam Adventurous Di b. 1990	Tamaral b. 1983	Summer Legend ch. 1973	Raise a Native
Dam Adventurous Di b. 1990	Tamaral b. 1983	Summer Legend ch. 1973	Scotch Verdict
