= Spun Sugar =

American-bred Thoroughbred racehorse

- Sire: Awesome Again
- Grandsire: Deputy Minister
- Dam: Irish Cherry
- Damsire: Irish Open
- Sex: Mare
- Foaled: 2002
- Country: United States
- Colour: Dark Brown
- Breeder: Adena Springs
- Owner: Shadwell Estate
- Trainer: Todd Pletcher
- Record: 13: 6-3-1
- Earnings: $929,171

Major wins
- Black-Eyed Susan Stakes (2005); Apple Blossom Handicap (2006); Go for Wand Handicap (2006)

Spun Sugar (foaled January 28, 2002 in Kentucky) is an American thoroughbred mare racehorse. She is sired by multiple grade one stakes winner Awesome Again, who was United States Horse of the Year. He in turn was sired by another leading American sire in Deputy Minister. She was out of the mare Irish Cherry.

Spun Sugar raced 13 times and won or placed in nine races, seven of them stakes races. She is probably best known for her wins in the Grade II $200,000 Black-Eyed Susan Stakes on May 20, 2005, and the grade one Apple Blossom Handicap.

== Three-year-old season ==
As a three-year-old in 2005, Stronach Stable's Spun Sugar won the $250,000 Grade 2 Black-Eyed Susan Stakes as she beat a field of six three-year-old rivals at Pimlico Race Course. At that time, Spun Sugar was three for four lifetime. The win marked her first added-money stakes score, after winning a maiden and an allowance race prior to that start. The Black-Eyed Susan Stakes is considered by many to be the de facto second leg of the "Filly Triple Crown." The Todd Pletcher trainee was sent to post as the favorite at odds of 1.20-1 odds at "Old-Hilltop" and won under jockey John Velazquez. She won going away by 3 3/4 lengths in 1:53 for the 1 1/8 mile distance over a sloppy track. R Lady Joy, a 5-1 shot, took second, while 7.50-1 shot Pleasant Chimes was another three lengths back in third. Spun Sugar paid $4.40 to win as the favorite.

Later that year, Spun Sugar placed second all three legs of New York's Triple Tiara. The three legs were all grade one stakes races that encompassed the Mother Goose at 1-1/8 miles (9 furlongs) and Coaching Club American Oaks at 1 1/4 miles (10 furlongs) at Belmont Park as well as the Alabama Stakes 1 1/4 miles (10 furlongs) at Saratoga.

== Four-year-old season ==
Spun Sugar won the grade one Apple Blossom Handicap in 2006 over grade one winner Happy Ticket at 8.5 furlongs at Oaklawn Park. She also captured that year's grade one Go for Wand Handicap at 1-1/8 miles (9 furlongs) at Saratoga Race Course.

== Retirement ==
Upon retirement, Spun Sugar was sold privately to Sheik Hamdan bin Rashid Al Maktoum and Shadwell Estate. She currently resides at Shadwell Farm in Lexington, KY.
