= Fiftyshadesofhay =

American-bred Thoroughbred racehorse

- Sire: Pulpit
- Grandsire: A.P. Indy
- Dam: Quiet Kim
- Damsire: Real Quiet
- Sex: Mare
- Foaled: 2010
- Country: United States
- Colour: Bay
- Breeder: WinStar Farm, LLC
- Owner: Karl Watson & Michael E. Pegram
- Trainer: Bob Baffert
- Record: 16: 5-4-3
- Earnings: $946,547

Major wins
- Black-Eyed Susan Stakes (2013); Santa Ysabel Stakes (2013); Iowa Oaks (2013); Ruffian Handicap (2014)
- Last updated on May 11, 2014

Fiftyshadesofhay (foaled April 14, 2010 in Kentucky) is an American Thoroughbred racehorse. The daughter of Pulpit beat Marathon Lady in the mile and an eighth Grade II $500,000 Black-Eyed Susan Stakes at Pimlico Race Course on May 17, 2013.

== Two-year-old season ==
Fiftyshadesofhay began her racing career on September 1, 2012, in a $70,000 Maiden Special Weight at Del Mar racetrack at five and a half furlongs on synthetic. In that race, she broke fifth under jockey Rafael Bejarano and finished fourth. In her next race, on September 29, 2012, she competed in a $47,000 maiden event at six furlongs at her home track at Santa Anita Park on the dirt. Fiftyshadesofhay broke ninth in a field of eleven, steadily advanced to fourth on the backstretch, and finished third.

On October 28, 2012, she started in another $47,000 maiden race at Santa Anita and finished second after being steadied near the mile marker. In her fourth attempt at a Maiden Special Weight race, on November 22, 2012, she ran at a distance of one mile and one sixteenth at Hollywood Park Racetrack for $45,000. Under jockey Rafael Bejarano, Fiftyshadesofhay broke fourth and within half a dozen strides took the lead. She maintained her lead of a half length around both turns a bit off the rail. In the stretch, Bajarano gave her some urging, and she won by three and one quarter lengths.

== Three-year-old season ==
In her three-year-old debut, Fiftyshadesofhay's connections tested her on the grass on New Year's Day in the $75,000 Blue Norther Stakes at Santa Anita Park at a mile. She broke eighth, moved up to fourth, and faded back to finish eighth in a field of eleven.

Four weeks later, on January 26, 2013, Bob Baffert put Fiftyshadesofhay back on the dirt in the $100,000 Grade 3 Santa Ysabel Stakes at a mile and one sixteenth at Santa Anita. She broke second under jockey Rafael Bejarano by one and half lengths. Moving into the final turn, she overtook the leader and in the stretch pulled clear and won by five and three quarter lengths.

Fiftyshadesofhay's connections decided to step up in class and race her against the best fillies in the western half of the country in the $250,000 Grade 1 Las Virgenes Stakes at Santa Anita Park at a mile on the dirt. On March 2, 2013, she was sent off as the second favorite at 2–1 in a field of eight. Under jockey Rafael Bejarano, she broke second and maintained that position throughout the race just off the rail. Fiftyshadesofhay finished three and a half lengths behind eventual Kentucky Oaks runner-up Beholder. She beat third-place finisher Scarlet Strike by one and half lengths and the rest of the field by two to ten lengths.

Next on the docket for Fiftyshadesofhay was the premier race on the West Coast for three-year old fillies: the $300,000 Grade 1 Santa Anita Oaks, run on April 6, 2013, as the week's featured race at a mile and one sixteenth. It featured a compact field of six. In that race, Fiftyshadesofhay broke a step slowly in fourth under Bejarano again. She stalked the leaders and moved up to second on the backstretch. Beholder won by about three lengths. In deep stretch, Fiftyshadesofhay was nipped at the wire for second by a head by 16-1 longshot Iotapa.

On May 17, 2013, trainer Bob Baffert and owners Mike Pegram, Karl Watson and Paul Weitman decided to ship Fiftyshadesofhay to Pimlico Race Course in Baltimore, Maryland, to run in the second jewel of de facto Filly Triple Crown, the $500,000 Grade 2 Black-Eyed Susan Stakes. Nine three year-old fillies were entered, with Grade 1 Ashland Stakes winner Emollient the odds-on favorite at 4–5. In that one mile and one eighth race on dirt, Fiftyshadesofhay broke second under new jockey Joel Rosario but was quickly subdued and settled into sixth place passing the stands for the first time under the wire. At the clubhouse turn, she was almost five lengths back ahead of only Lady Banks. Down the backstretch, she edged up into fifth, still six lengths behind leader Maracuya under John Velazquez.

Around the far turn, Fiftyshadesofhay moved up under hand urging by Rosario into contention in fourth place. She ducked in slightly toward the rail into the two path and then swept around the leaders into about the seven path down the lane. Fiftyshadesofhay passed Toastng and pace setter Maracuya, challenging the leader, Marathon Lady. Just after the sixteenth pole, she collared Marathon Lady and surged near the wire to win the 89th running of the Black-Eyed Susan Stakes by a neck in a time of 1:52.73.

Baffert was quoted at the end of May as saying, "She will definitely be back out on the road this summer with the Grade 1 Alabama Stakes at Saratoga Race Course being her next major objective."

On June 29, 2013, Fiftyshadesofhay won the mile and one sixteenth Iowa Oaks at Prairie Meadows Racetrack in Altoona, Iowa. She stalked the leader in second place for most of the race. Then, around the final turn, she took over the lead and won by four lengths over Seaneen Girl and So Many Ways.

Fiftyshadesofhay raced again on August 17, 2013, in the Grade 1 $600,000 Alabama Stakes at Saratoga Race Course. She finished second to heavy favorite Princess of Sylmar as the 7-2 second choice.

== Pedigree ==
Pedigree of Fiftyshadesofhay
| Sire Pulpit dk br 1994 | A.P. Indy dk br 1989 | Seattle Slew | Bold Reasoning |
| Sire Pulpit dk br 1994 | A.P. Indy dk br 1989 | Seattle Slew | My Charmer |
| Sire Pulpit dk br 1994 | A.P. Indy dk br 1989 | Weekend Surprise | Secretariat |
| Sire Pulpit dk br 1994 | A.P. Indy dk br 1989 | Weekend Surprise | Lassie Dear |
| Sire Pulpit dk br 1994 | Preach bay 1989 | Mr. Prospector | Raise a Native |
| Sire Pulpit dk br 1994 | Preach bay 1989 | Mr. Prospector | Gold Digger |
| Sire Pulpit dk br 1994 | Preach bay 1989 | Narrate | Honest Pleasure |
| Sire Pulpit dk br 1994 | Preach bay 1989 | Narrate | State |
| Dam Quiet Kim bay 2003 | Real Quiet bay 1995 | Quiet American | Fappiano |
| Dam Quiet Kim bay 2003 | Real Quiet bay 1995 | Quiet American | Demure |
| Dam Quiet Kim bay 2003 | Real Quiet bay 1995 | Really Blue | Believe It |
| Dam Quiet Kim bay 2003 | Real Quiet bay 1995 | Really Blue | Meadow Blue |
| Dam Quiet Kim bay 2003 | Miss Alydeed bay 1998 | Alydeed | Shadeed |
| Dam Quiet Kim bay 2003 | Miss Alydeed bay 1998 | Alydeed | Bialy |
| Dam Quiet Kim bay 2003 | Miss Alydeed bay 1998 | Filet | Full Pocket |
| Dam Quiet Kim bay 2003 | Miss Alydeed bay 1998 | Filet | Ice Fantasy |
