= Trifecta =

Type of bet on a horse race

Trifecta

A trifecta is a parimutuel bet placed on a horse race in which the bettor must predict which horses will finish first, second, and third, in the exact order. Known as a trifecta in the US and Australia, this is known as a tricast in the UK, a tierce in Hong Kong, a triactor in Canada and a tiercé in France.

== Variations ==
=== Boxed ===
A "boxed" trifecta (called a trio in Hong Kong and France) is where three horses are selected, and the player wins if these three horses finish first in any order. Boxed bets are effectively equivalent to placing standard trifecta bets on all six possible outcomes of the selected horses. For example, a boxed trifecta of horses numbered 6, 7 and 9, wins if horses finish in any of these combinations of outcomes:

- 6, 7, 9
- 6, 9, 7
- 7, 6, 9
- 7, 9, 6
- 9, 6, 7
- 9, 7, 6.

=== Banker ===
One horse (the "banker") is chosen to win the race, and two or more selections are boxed to come second and third. The "banker" must win in all possible combinations. For example, if horse number 2 is the banker, and the other three choices are numbered 6, 7 and 8, then there are a total six possible combinations for a winning bet:

- 2, 6, 7
- 2, 6, 8
- 2, 7, 6
- 2, 7, 8
- 2, 8, 6
- 2, 8, 7.

=== Roving banker or banker multiple ===
One horse (the "banker") is chosen to finish in the first three, and three or more selections are boxed for the other two places – the banker must finish either 1st, 2nd or 3rd in each possible combination. For example, if horse number 6 is the banker, and horses number 7, 8 and 9 are the selections, then there are total of eighteen combinations for a winning bet, each with horse number 6 in them, for example:

- 6, 7, 8
- 7, 6, 8
- 7, 8, 6
- 6, 8, 9
- 8, 9, 6, and so on.

== History ==
The term was first used in the 1970s, and was derived from perfecta (a bet on which horses will finish first and second) and tri- (three).

In the United States, the trifecta was introduced at Arlington Park in 1971. It was first used in Australia in April 1977 by TAB New South Wales, and was introduced in New Zealand in December 1983.

== See also ==
- Superfecta
