= Superfecta =

Top-4 wager in parimutuel betting

The superfecta is a type of wager in the United States and Canada parimutuel betting in which the bettor, in order to win, must pick the first four finishers of a race in the correct sequence. This is even more unlikely than a successful wager in the trifecta, which requires correctly picking the first three finishers in order, and as such will have a correspondingly higher payoff.

Most exotic wagers in horseracing are a 1 dollar minimum. Due to the difficulty of the superfecta, some racetracks have lowered the minimum on the superfecta to 10 cents. This 10 cent bet is very popular with the fans as it permits a bettor with a small bankroll to cover many combinations and still have a chance for a large payoff.

Due to the imprecise nature of the name (as opposed to other bets such as the trifecta), superfecta bets can sometimes require selecting more than four horses. For instance, the New South Wales TAB in Australia previously offered a superfecta bet on selected races requiring bettors to pick the first six finishers in the correct order, rather than four. The bet requiring the selection of four finishers in order is instead referred to by most Australian totalisators as a First Four bet (or in Western Australia as a Quartet). Although the first-six superfecta bet is still theoretically allowed by New South Wales regulations, the First Four bet has all but replaced it there.

This type of wager is called quadrifecta in Brazil and cuatrifecta in Argentina and Uruguay ("quad-fecta").

== See also ==
- Grand Slam of Thoroughbred racing
