= 2008 Black-Eyed Susan Stakes =

Horse race held at Pimlico Race Course

84th Black-Eyed Susan Stakes
- Black-Eyed Susan Stakes
- Location: Pimlico Race Course, Baltimore, Maryland, United States
- Date: May 16, 2008
- Winning horse: Sweet Vendetta
- Jockey: Channing Hill
- Conditions: Fast
- Surface: Dirt

The 2008 Black-Eyed Susan Stakes was the 84th running of the Black-Eyed Susan Stakes. The race took place in Baltimore, Maryland on May 16, 2008, and was televised in the United States on the Bravo TV network owned by NBC. Ridden by jockey Channing Hill, Sweet Vendetta, won the race by one and one half lengths over runner-up Shes All Eltish. Approximate post time on the evening before the Preakness Stakes was 5:50 p.m. Eastern Time and the race was run for a purse of $150,000. The race was run over a fast track in a final time of 1:49.60. The Maryland Jockey Club reported total attendance of 18,407.

== Payout ==
The 84th Black-Eyed Susan Stakes Payout Schedule

Program Number	Horse Name	Win	Place	Show
2	Sweet Vendetta	$17.40	$8.40	$5.20
8	Shes All Eltish	-	$4.60	$3.40
6	Seattle Smooth	-	-	$3.40

$2 Exacta: (2–8) paid $85.80

$2 Trifecta: (2–8–6) paid $514.20

$1 Superfecta: (2–8–6–4) paid $904.70

== The full chart ==
Finish Position	Lengths Behind	Post Position	Horse name	Trainer	Jockey	Owner	Post Time Odds	Purse Earnings
1st	0	1	Sweet Vendetta	Gary C. Contessa	Channing Hill	David Cassidy & Team Penney Racing	7.70-1	$90,000
2nd	11/2	8	Shes All Eltish	Martin D. Wolfson	Garrett Gomez	Denholtz Stables	3.40-1	$30,000
3rd	21/4	6	Seattle Smooth	Julio Canani	Edgar Prado	Mercedes Stable, LLC	3.00-1	$15,000
4th	61/2	4	Highest Class	Neil Howard	Robby Albarado	William S. Farish	5.00-1	$9,000
5th	91/2	9	Pious Ashley	Dale Romans	Kent J. Desormeaux	Dixiana Farm	6.00-1	$4,500
6th	12	3	Sherine	Anthony W. Dutrow	Alan Garcia	Zayat Stable	6.00-1	
7th	23	2	Maren's Meadow	J. Larry Jones	Gabriel Saez	River Ridge Ranch	13.70-1	
8th	231/4	5	Bsharpsonata	Timothy Salzman	Eric Camacho	Cloverleaf Farm II, Inc.	2.80-1 favorite	
9th	dnf	7	One Step Ahead	Jennifer Bramblett	Pablo Morales	Rev It Up Racing Stables	2.00-1	scratch

- Winning Breeder: David Cassidy; (VA)
- Final Time: 1:49.60
- Track Condition: Fast
- Total Attendance: 18,407

== See also ==
- 2008 Preakness Stakes
- Black-Eyed Susan Stakes Stakes "top three finishers" and # of starters
