= Mesabi Maiden =

American-bred Thoroughbred racehorse

- Sire: Cox's Ridge
- Grandsire: Best Turn
- Dam: Steel Maiden
- Damsire: Damascus
- Sex: Mare
- Foaled: 1993
- Country: United States
- Colour: Bay
- Breeder: Stuart S. Janney III & Ogden Phipps
- Owner: Stuart S. Janney III & Ogden Phipps
- Trainer: Gary C. Contessa
- Record: 18: 3-1-6
- Earnings: $240,314

Major wins
- Black-Eyed Susan Stakes (1996)
- Last updated on July 1, 2011

Mesabi Maiden (foaled in 1993 in Kentucky) is an American Thoroughbred racehorse. The daughter of Cox's Ridge and Steel Maiden out of Hall of Fame Champion Damascus is probably best remembered for winning the mile and an eighth Grade II $200,000 Black-Eyed Susan Stakes at Pimlico Race Course on May 17, 1996.

== Racing career ==
Mesabi Maiden broke her maiden in her third start in December 1995 and then won an allowance race in early March 1996 at Aqueduct Racetrack. Owners Stuart S. Janney III and Ogden Phipps, along with trainer Gary C. Contessa, then entered her in the second jewel of the de facto filly Triple Crown, the Grade II $200,000 Black-Eyed Susan Stakes in May 1996. In that mile and an eighth race on the dirt, Mesabi Maiden beat a field of eight, including heavy favorite Cara Rafaela and stakes winner Ginny Lynn. The final time for the nine furlong Black-Eyed Susan was 1:51.00 flat under her jockey Mike E. Smith.

Mesabi Maiden then finished third in five of her last six races. Some of those third-place finishes came in graded stakes races, such as the grade two Monmouth Breeders' Cup Oaks in New Jersey where she finished behind Top Secret, the grade three Anne Arundel Stakes at Laurel Park Racecourse against Hey Let's Dance, and the grade three Astarita Stakes at Belmont Park, where she lost to Broad Dynamite. Mesabi Maiden finished her racing career with six third-place finishes and three wins, an overall record of 3-1-6 out of 18 starts, and earnings of $245,314.
