= Tempted Stakes =

- Class: Listed
- Location: Aqueduct Racetrack; Jamaica, New York, United States
- Inaugurated: 1975
- Race type: Thoroughbred - Flat racing
- Website: Aqueduct Racetrack

Race information
- Distance: 1 mile (8 furlongs)
- Surface: Dirt
- Track: Left-handed
- Qualification: Two-year-old fillies
- Purse: $100,000

The Tempted Stakes is an American Thoroughbred horse race held annually since 1975 at Aqueduct Racetrack in Jamaica, New York. Run near the end of October, the ungraded stakes race is open to 2-year-old fillies and is contested on dirt over a distance of one mile (8 furlongs). It currently offers a purse of $100,000.

The race is named in honor of Tempted, voted U.S. Champion Handicap Mare in 1959.

In 1976, the race mare, Pearl Necklace, won this race. Our Mims placed. In 1979, it was won by the future U.S. Racing Hall of Fame inductee Genuine Risk and in 1990 by another future Hall of Famer, Flawlessly.

For 2011 only, the distance was shortened to 6 furlongs. It was changed from Aqueduct to Belmont Park and moved to earlier in the month as a prep for the inaugural Breeders' Cup Juvenile Sprint that was run on November 4 of that year.

== Records ==
Speed record:

- 1:36.09 @ 1 mile: Summer Raven (2004)

Most wins by a jockey:

- 4 - John Velazquez (1993, 2001, 2002, 2003)

Most wins by a trainer:

- 5 -Todd A. Pletcher (2001, 2002, 2004, 2009, 2013, 2020)

Most wins by an owner:

- 2 - Mrs. Bertram R. Firestone (1979, 1989)

== Winners ==
Year	Winner	Age	Jockey	Trainer	Owner	Dist. (Miles) (Furlongs)	Time	Win $	Gr.
2025	Shilling	2	Christopher Elliott	Kenneth McPeek	Fern Circle Stables	1 m	1:38.45	$90,000	L/R
2024	Stunner	2	Dylan Davis	Brad Cox	LNJ Foxwoods and Church Street Stable	1 m	1:36.90	$90,000	L/R
2023	Shimmering Allure	2	Junior Alvarado	Kenneth McPeek	Walking L Thoroughbreds, LLC	1 m	1:37.84	$90,000	L/R
2022	Good Sam	2	Irad Ortiz Jr.	Chad C. Brown	Peter M. Brant	1 m	1:38.69	$90,000	L/R
2021	Gerrymander	2	Eric Cancel	Chad C. Brown	Klaravich Stables	1 m	1:38.13	$82,000	L/R
2020	Malathaat	2	Kendrick Carmouche	Todd A. Pletcher	Shadwell Stable	1 m	1:40.35	$55,000	L/R
2019	Maedean	2	Luis Saez	Mark Hennig	Courtlandt Farms (Donald & Donna Adam)	1 m	1:36.36	$82,500	L/R
2018	Oxy Lady	2	Declan Cannon	Jack Sisterson	Calumet Farm	1 m	1:38.88	$82,500	G3
2017	Daisy	2	Kendrick Carmouche	John Servis	Fox Hill Farms, Inc.	1 m	1:37.13	$90,000	G3
2016	Miss Sky Warrior	2	Paco Lopez	Kelly J. Breen	Arlene's Sun Star Stable	1 m	1:38.62	$120,000	G3
2015	Big World	2	José L. Ortiz	Anthony W. Dutrow	Maggie Moss	1 m	1:37.19	$120,000	G3
2014	Jacaranda	2	José L. Ortiz	Michael E. Hushion	Barry K. Schwartz	1 m	1:40.24	$150,000	G3
2013	Stopchargingmaria	2	Javier Castellano	Todd A. Pletcher	Repole Stable	1 m	1:38.77	$150,000	G3
2012	My Happy Face	2	Jose Lezcano	H. James Bond	Michael Dubb	1 m	1:36.32	$90,000	G3
2011	Believe You Can	2	Gabriel Saez	Larry Jones	Brereton C. Jones	6 f	1:11.20	$60,000	G3
2010	Full Moon Blues	2	Malcolm Franklin	Timothy Tullock Jr.	Jeffrey L. Nielsen	1 m	1:38.56	$60,000	G3
2009	Ailalea	2	Eibar Coa	Todd A. Pletcher	Starlight Partners	1 m	1:36.75	$63,900	G3
2008	Livin Lovin	2	Ramon Dominguez	Steve Klesaris	Puglisi Racing	1 m	1:36.89	$64,680	G3
2007	Elusive Lady	2	Eibar Coa	John C. Kimmel	Gold Mark Farm LLC	1 m	1:38.40	$63,960	G3
2006	Successful Outlook	2	Joe Bravo	Scott Blasi	Gainesway Stable	1 m	1:37.36	$64,920	G3
2005	Better Now	2	Javier Castellano	Mark Hennig	Lee Lewis	1 m	1:38.35	$66,600	G3
2004	Summer Raven	2	Stewart Elliott	Todd Pletcher	Edgewood Farm	1 m	1:36.09	$63,960	G3
2003	La Reina	2	John Velazquez	Claude McGaughey III	Emory A. Hamilton	1 m	1:36.15	$66,420	G3
2002	Chimichurri	2	John Velazquez	Todd A. Pletcher	Peachtree Stable	1 m	1:37.52	$66,240	G3
2001	Smok'n Frolic	2	John Velazquez	Todd A. Pletcher	Dogwood Stable	1 m	1:37.77	$66,900	G3
2000	Two Item Limit	2	Richard Migliore	Stephen L. DiMauro	Joseph F. Graffeo	1 m	1:38.53	$65,520	G3
1999	Shawnee Country	2	Jorge Chavez	D. Wayne Lukas	Overbrook Farm	1 m	1:38.60	$65,460	G3
1998	Oh What a Windfall	2	Jerry Bailey	Claude McGaughey III	Ogden Phipps	1 m	1:39.84	$66,120	G3
1997	Dancing With Ruth	2	Tommy Turner	Benjamin W. Perkins Jr.	Gene Cox	1 m	1:37.55	$65,340	G3
1996	Ajina	2	Jerry Bailey	William I. Mott	Allen E. Paulson	1 m	1:36.59	$66,240	G3
1995	Race not held								
1994	Special Broad	2	Julie Krone	Richard W. Small	Robert Meyerhoff	1 m	1:37.20	$66,000	G3
1993	Sovereign Kitty	2	John Velazquez	Richard Schosberg	Heatherwood Farm	1-1/16 m	1:46.84	$69,720	G3
1992	True Affair	2	Joe Bravo	Gary Contessa	Winbound Farms	1-1/16 m	1:47.48	$68,520	G3
1991	Deputation	2	David Lidberg	Claude McGaughey III	Stuart S. Janney III	1-1/16 m	1:46.74	$72,600	G3
1990	Flawlessly	2	Jerry Bailey	Richard E. Dutrow Jr.	Harbor View Farm	1-1/16 m	1:46.36	$56,250	G3
1989	Worth Avenue	2	Randy Romero	William I. Mott	Mrs. Bertram R. Firestone	1-1/16 m	1:46.15	$69,480	G3
1988	Box Office Gold	2	José A. Santos	D. Wayne Lukas	Joseph Allen	1-1/16 m	1:46.15	$57,600	G3
1987	Thirty Eight Go Go	2	Kent Desormeaux	King T. Leathurbury	Janet Wayson	1-1/16 m	1:44.35	$100,920	G3
1986	Silent Turn	2	Chris Antley	Robert E. Wheeler	Leslie Millman	1-1/16 m	1:46.15	$74,400	G3
1985	Cosmic Tiger	2	Eddie Maple	Charles R. Lewis	R. A. Brookes Jr.	1-1/16 m	1:46.15	$68,580	G3
1984	Willow Mood	2	Jorge Velásquez	Daniel Perlsweig	Mrs. C. C. Polin	1-1/16 m	1:46.45	$57,330	G3
1983	Surely Georgie's	2	Ruben Hernandez	James W. Maloney	Mrs. G. G. Proskauer	1-1/16 m	1:39.35	$34,320	G3
1982	Only Queens	2	Miguel Rivera	Joseph A. Trovato	Barry K. Schwartz	1-1/16 m	1:37.00	$33,180	G3
1981	Choral Group	2	Jorge Velásquez	MacDonald Benson	Windfield Farms	1-1/16 m	1:38.00	$33,000	G3
1980	Tina Tina Too	2	Cash Asmussen	Richard T. DeStasio	Albert Fried Jr.	1-1/16 m	1:38.25	$32,580	G3
1979	Genuine Risk	2	Jacinto Vásquez	LeRoy Jolley	Mrs. Bertram R. Firestone	1-1/16 m	1:36.00	$33,060	G3
1978	Whisper Fleet	2	Ángel Cordero Jr.	Thomas J. Kelly	Martin B. Townsend	1-1/16 m	1:36.15	$25,665	G3
1977	Caesar's Wish	2	Gregg McCarron	Richard W. Small	Sally Gibson	1-1/16 m	1:36.15	$22,635	G3
1976	Pearl Necklace	2	Ángel Cordero Jr.	Roger Laurin	Reginald N. Webster	1-1/16 m	1:39.35	$22,380	G3
1975	Secret Lavin	2	Jean Cruguet	Sam Cardile	Milton Somerfiled	1-1/16 m	1:35.25	$33,600	G3
