= Roar Emotion =

American-bred Thoroughbred racehorse

- Sire: Roar
- Grandsire: Forty Niner
- Dam: Emotional Outburst
- Damsire: Capote
- Sex: Mare
- Foaled: 2000
- Country: United States
- Colour: Bay
- Breeder: Brenda Jones
- Owner: H. Joseph Allen
- Trainer: Carlos Martin
- Record: 17: 5-4-3
- Earnings: $635,912

Major wins
- Black-Eyed Susan Stakes (2003); Demoiselle Stakes (2002); Sabin Handicap (2004)

Roar Emotion (foaled on January 30, 2000, in Kentucky) is an American Thoroughbred racehorse. The granddaughter of Forty Niner will best be remembered for her score in the mile and an eighth Grade II $250,000 Black-Eyed Susan Stakes at Pimlico Race Course on 16, May 2003.

== Early career ==
Roar Emotion was an early foal born in January 2000 in the state of Kentucky by breeder Brenda Jones. She was sold as a two-year-old in training at the Ocala Breeders' Sale in April 2002 to her owner H. Joseph Allen for only $37,000.

That fall she raced in several races in New York with mixed results. Then in the November, Roar Emotion stepped up in class and won the grade two Demoiselle Stakes at Aqueduct run over the dirt at one mile. In that race she beat a solid field of ten fillies in 1:51.43 over Savedbythelight and Feisty Step.

== Three-year-old season ==
Roar Emotion showed promise early in March of her three-year-old year as she placed second in the grade three Cicada Stakes at seven furlongs at Aqueduct Racetrack. That race was won by Cyber Secret in a field of six as Boxer Girl finished third.

She was training so well that her connections decided to take a shot with her in the second jewel of America's de facto Filly Triple Crown, the Black-Eyed Susan Stakes. Roar Emotion was the third choice at 3-1 on the morning line in a strong field of eight other stakes winners. She broke alertly under jockey John R. Velazquez and set the pace two paths off the rail, with fractions of 23, 47, and 1:12 for the first six furlongs. Ivanavinalot and 57-1 longshot Blushing Valleys stalked the pace early. However, those two could not keep up by the top of the stretch. Santa Catarina, the 4-5 favorite was in fourth early, moved up turning for home gaining second, but was no match for the pacesetter. Longshot Fircroft at 13-1 came on strong from seventh picking up momentum with 3 furlongs left to run, but her late rally came up just 1/2 a length short, with Roar Emotion getting the win in gate-to-wire style in 1:52.33. That victory in the Preakness Friday feature was $200,000 grade two stakes race held at a rainswept Pimlico Race Course. It was 8-1/2 lengths back in third to Santa Catarina, the 4-5 favorite trained by Bob Baffert. Completing the order of finish were Ivanavinalot, Xtra Heart, Grace Bay, Blushing Valleys, and Lets Just Do It.

== Four-year-old season ==
At age four, Roar Emotion started the year off in the winter in Florida. In February she was entered in a handicap race at Gulfstream Park for older mares and showed that she was very talented. In $100,000 grade three Sabin Handicap she took command at the top of the stretch and won going away in a field of nine. She beat Nosuch Bay and Lead Story in second and third respectively going a 1-1/16 miles. Roar Emotion, ridden again by John R. Velazquez and finished the race in 1:43.1 and paid $6.40 to win.

Later in her 2004 season there were two other events in New York that Roar Emotion performed well down the lane and placed in graded stakes races. She had a strong second place showing in October in the Turn Back the Alarm Handicap at Aqueduct Racetrack at nine furlongs on turf. Roar Emotion pulled away from the field in the stretch but could not hold off the winner and lost that race by only a neck to Bobby Frankel's Personal Legend. She then finished the year in November in the grade two Top Flight Handicap in which she finished third to Daydreaming under Jerry Bailey. That race was at eight furlongs and was also at Aqueduct.

== Retirement ==
In 2005 Roar Emotion was retired and purchased for $2.4 million at the Keeneland November sale. She was sold to Jess Jackson of Stonestreet Stable. In 2006 she had a foal by A.P. Indy.
