= Stopchargingmaria =

American-bred Thoroughbred racehorse

- Sire: Tale of the Cat
- Grandsire: Storm Cat
- Dam: Exotic Bloom
- Damsire: Montbrook
- Sex: Mare
- Foaled: 2011
- Country: United States
- Colour: Dark Brown
- Breeder: Harvey Clarke & Brookdale Farm LLC
- Owner: Town And Country Farms
- Trainer: Todd Pletcher
- Record: 18: 9-4-1
- Earnings: $3,014,000

Major wins
- Demoiselle Stakes (2013); Tempted Stakes (2013); Black-Eyed Susan Stakes (2014); Coaching Club American Oaks (2014); Alabama Stakes (2014); Allaire duPont Distaff Stakes (2015); Shuvee Handicap (2015) Breeders' Cup wins: Breeders' Cup Distaff (2015)
- Last updated on August 2, 2015

Stopchargingmaria (foaled March 26, 2011 in Kentucky) is an American Thoroughbred racehorse. The daughter of Tale of the Cat won the mile and an eighth Grade II $500,000 Black-Eyed Susan Stakes at Pimlico Race Course on May 16, 2014. and the Grade I 2014 Coaching Club American Oaks at Saratoga. In 2015 she won the Allaire duPont Distaff Stakes and the Shuvee Handicap before recording her biggest success in the Breeders' Cup Distaff. She is owned by Town and Country Farms and trained by Todd Pletcher.

== Two-year-old season ==
Stopchargingmaria was bred in Kentucky by Harvey Clarke and Brookdale Farm LLC. She was sold for $220,000 in the Ocala Breeders' Sales Company Selected Sale of Two-Year-Olds in Training sale in March 2013 by her consignor, Woodford Thoroughbreds.

On July 19, 2013, Stopchargingmaria debuted in a 5 1/2-furlong Maiden Special Weight race at Saratoga Race Course and won handily. On September 1 she placed second to Sweet Reason in the Grade I Spinaway Stakes, also at Saratoga. Pletcher brought her back in five weeks to run in the Grade I Frizette Stakes run at a mile at Belmont Park, where she finished third to long shot Artemis Agrotera.

On October 3 Stopchargingmaria won the Grade III Tempted Stakes run at one mile at Aqueduct Racetrack. She then won the Grade I Demoiselle Stakes run at a mile, also at Aqueduct. After five starts in four months, Pletcher decided to give Stopchargingmaria some time off and freshened her during the winter for a three-month break.

== Three-year-old season ==
In her three-year-old debut, Stopchargingmaria's connections shipped her down to Florida for the winter. On February 22, 2014, she ran in the Grade II Davona Dale Stakes at Gulfstream Park and finished fifth behind her stablemate Onlyforyou. On April 5 she finished fourth to Sugar Shock in the Fantasy Stakes at a mile and one sixteenth at Oaklawn Park Race Track. Her connections then chose to skip the Kentucky Oaks.

On May 16, 2014, trainer Todd Pletcher and owner Mike Repole decided to ship Stopchargingmaria to Pimlico Race Course in Baltimore, Maryland, to run in the second jewel of the de facto Filly Triple Crown, the Black-Eyed Susan Stakes. Eleven three-year-old fillies were entered, and Stopchargingmaria was made the second favorite at 7-2 behind stablemate Sloan Square at 3–1. In the one mile and one eighth race on dirt, Stopchargingmaria broke slowly and passed the stands for the first time in sixth place after one quarter mile. She was rated early moving into the clubhouse turn, then she was angled out four wide nearing the backstretch then closed in on the leaders and moved into fourth place rounding the final turn. Under hand urging by jockey Javier Castellano, she engaged frontrunning Vero Amore at the top of the lane and dueled outside of the leader throughout the stretch. then forged ahead in the final yards to win the Black-Eyed Susan by a neck in 1:51.79.

On July 20, 2014, she won the Grade I Coaching Club American Oaks for her fifth win in nine starts. She outgunned Unbridled Forever and Miss Besilu to take the race by 2 1/2 lengths and was drawing away at the finish. On August 16, 2014, she won the Grade 1 $600,000 Alabama Stakes at Saratoga. Stopchargingmaria made her move on the far turn, turning away a challenge from Miss Besilu to stay on strong through the stretch. Joint Return made a late bid for second; Miss Besilu was third. The final time was 2:05.14.

Stopchargingmaria was scheduled to meet the Kentucky Oaks winner Untapable in the Cotillion Stakes over 8 1/2 furlongs at Parx on September 20 but was scratched from the race and appeared a week later in the Beldame Stakes against older fillies and mares. She started the 31/20 favourite but lost to the five-year-old Belle Gallantey by eight lengths.

== Four-year-old season ==
In her four-year-old debut, Stopchargingmaria finished second in the Grade 1 Madison Stakes at Keeneland Race Course on April 4, 2015. The following month, she shipped to Pimlico Race Course, the site of one of her greatest victories in the 2014 Black-Eyed Susan Stakes, and raced on the under card of that race in the Grade 3 $150,000 Allaire duPont Distaff Stakes. She was listed as the odds-on favorite in a field of twelve entries on May 15, 2015. Stopchargingmaria stumbled out of the gate and was fanned four wide on the final turn but finished first, driving home to win by four lengths.

Stopchargingmaria and Untapable faced each other for the first time in the Grade 3 Shuvee Handicap on August 2, 2015. They broke next to each other, and it was a two-horse race from the start. Untapable set the pace, with Stopchargingmaria never more than a length behind her. Both fillies were stride for stride in the homestretch until Stopchargingmaria prevailed by a length over Untapable. In the Personal Ensign Stakes at the end of August, she was fourth behind Sheer Drama, Got Lucky, and Untapable.

In the 2015 Breeders' Cup Distaff, ridden by Javier Castellano, Stopchargingmaria defeated Stellar Wind by a neck in a stretch run complicated by an objection from the second-place finisher because she bore out in the stretch, brushed Stellar Wind several times and pushed the other horse further to the outside. Pletcher stated that he felt the long layoff after the Personal Ensign was a major factor in her success, as "she runs her best races sometimes when she's fresh."

== Pedigree ==
Pedigree of Stopchargingmaria
Sire Tale of the Cat (bay 1994)	Storm Cat (br 1983)	Storm Bird	Northern Dancer
Sire Tale of the Cat (bay 1994)	Storm Cat (br 1983)	Storm Bird	South Ocean
Sire Tale of the Cat (bay 1994)	Storm Cat (br 1983)	Terlingua	Secretariat
Sire Tale of the Cat (bay 1994)	Storm Cat (br 1983)	Terlingua	Crimson Saint
Sire Tale of the Cat (bay 1994)	Yarn (dk br 1987)	Mr Prospector	Raise a Native
Sire Tale of the Cat (bay 1994)	Yarn (dk br 1987)	Mr Prospector	Gold Digger
Sire Tale of the Cat (bay 1994)	Yarn (dk br 1987)	Narrate	Honest Pleasure
Sire Tale of the Cat (bay 1994)	Yarn (dk br 1987)	Narrate	State
Dam Exotic Bloom (bay 2004)	Montbrook dk br 1990	Buckaroo	Buckpasser
Dam Exotic Bloom (bay 2004)	Montbrook dk br 1990	Buckaroo	Stepping High
Dam Exotic Bloom (bay 2004)	Montbrook dk br 1990	Secret Papers	Jet Diplomacy
Dam Exotic Bloom (bay 2004)	Montbrook dk br 1990	Secret Papers	Attache Case
Dam Exotic Bloom (bay 2004)	Melegant (dk br 1996)	Kris S.	Roberto
Dam Exotic Bloom (bay 2004)	Melegant (dk br 1996)	Kris S.	Sharp Queen
Dam Exotic Bloom (bay 2004)	Melegant (dk br 1996)	Abidjan	Sir Ivor
Dam Exotic Bloom (bay 2004)	Melegant (dk br 1996)	Abidjan	Flag Waiver
