= East View Stakes =

Annual horse race in Queens, New York

- Class: Non-graded stakes
- Location: Aqueduct Racetrack; Queens, New York, United States
- Inaugurated: 1910
- Race type: Thoroughbred – Flat racing
- Website: www.nyra.com/index_aqueduct.html

Race information
- Distance: 1 mile 70 yards (8.32 furlongs)
- Surface: Dirt
- Track: left-handed
- Qualification: Two-year-old fillies
- Weight: Assigned
- Purse: $100,000 added

The East View Stakes is an American Thoroughbred horse race run annually at Aqueduct Racetrack in Queens, New York. It is restricted to fillies bred in the State of New York. Run in December, the race is contested on dirt over a distance of 1 1/16 miles.

The race was inaugurated in 1910 at the Empire City Race Track in Yonkers, New York as a contest for horses of either sex. Due to a New York State ban on parimutuel betting there was no race run in 1911, 1912, or 1913. It was not run in 1915 and in 1953 the event was suspended indefinitely. It was revived in 1978 with its current entry restrictions. The race was hosted by the Jamaica Race Course from 1943 through 1946, at Belmont Park in 1947, and again at the Jamaica Race Course from 1948 through 1953 after which it was moved to its present location at Aqueduct Racetrack.

The race was named for "East View", the name of the Westchester County, New York estate of James Butler, founder of the Empire City Race Track.

Notable winners from the pre 1953 era include National Museum of Racing and Hall of Fame inductees Native Dancer and Tom Fool. In the 1942 edition of the East View Stakes, Gold Shower upset Count Fleet.

On its return in 1978 as a race for fillies only, the East View Stakes was contested at a distance of seven furlongs until 1982 when it was run at one mile (eight furlongs). From 1987 through 1992 it reverted to seven furlongs then in 1993 it was run on turf at a distance of one mile. In 1994 the distance was set at its current 1 1/16 miles (eight and one half furlongs).

In 2012 it was again run at 1 mile but returned in 2013 to its former current distance of 8.32 furlongs.

== Records ==
Most wins by an trainer:

- 3 – Gary C. Contessa (1998, 2004, 2006)

Most wins by a jockey:

- 3 – Eddie Arcaro (1941, 1947, 1948)
- 3 – Jorge Velásquez (1979, 1982, 1985)
- 3 – Alan Garcia (2007, 2009, 2010)

Most wins by an owner:

- 2 – Flying Zee Stable (1995, 2001)

== Winners since 1978 ==
Year	Winner	Jockey	Trainer	Owner	Time
2025	Bernieandthehorse	Katie Davis	Domenick L. Schettino	Robert D. Rosenthal & Bradford H. Bernstein	1:26.35
2024	Sweet Brown Sugar	Jose Lezcano	Paul W. Burrow	Richie Rich Racing Stable	1:10.55
2023	Maple Leaf Mel	Joel Rosario	Jeremiah C. Englehart	August Dawn Farm	1:12.75
2022	Yo Cuz	José Ortiz	William I. Mott	Dream Maker Racing	1:26.94
2017	English Soul	Manuel Franco	Raymond Handal	Zilla Racing Stables	1:42.32
2016	Bonita Bianca	Irad Ortiz Jr.	Rudy R. Rodriguez	Michael Dubb, Bethlehem Stables & Michael Imperio	1:46.46
2015	Absatootly	Kendrick Carmouche	Charlton Baker	Newman Racing	1:44.50
2014	Freudie Anne	José Ortiz	Eddie Kenneally	Marc Detampel	1:44.50
2013	Flipcup	Rajiv Maragh	George Weaver	Team Penney Racing	1:45.64
2012	Kelly Got Frosty	Cornelio Velásquez	Rudy R. Rodriguez	Andrew I. Cohen, Lee Sacks, Aubrey Flanagan & Gary Tolchin	1:39.19
2011	Double Mint	Chuck Lopez	Dominic Galluscio	Team West Side Stables & Annie Zabar	1:45.92
2010	Queen's Harbor	Alan Garcia	Richard A. Violette, Jr	Richard A. Violette, Jr	1:44.11
2009	Opus A	Alan Garcia	Richard A. Violette Jr.	Broadway Blue Stable	1:44.44
2008	Don't Forget Gil	Rajiv Maragh	Mark Hennig	Alan Brodsky	1:46.34
2007	Sherine	Alan Garcia	Anthony Dutrow	Zayat Stables	1:47.36
2006	My Kitty	John R. Velazquez	Gary C. Conressa	Darlene Bilinski & Martin Zaretsky	1:46.03
2005	Home and Away	Jose Espinoza	Joe Lostritto	Joe Lostritto	1:47.95
2004	Successfully Sweet	Ariel Smith	Gary C. Conressa	Richard Simon	1:47.01
2003	Leedle Dee	Chuck Lopez	Robert Barbara	Jaz Kids Stable & Lawrence Klein	1:48.01
2002	Marc's Rainbow	Richard Migliore	Todd A. Pletcher	Albert Fried Jr.	1:46.64
2001	Seeyouinmydreams	Javier Castellano	Philip Serpe	Flying Zee Stable	1:44.80
2000	Astrapi	Diane Nelson	Robert Klesaris	Mialee Farms	1:46.40
1999	Shot Berry	Frank Lovato Jr.	Willie Riley	Blackmarlin Stable	1:45.00
1998	Long Distance	Richard Migliore	Gary C. Conressa	Monty Foss, Steven Wecker & John Moirano	1:45.60
1997	Best Friend Stro	Aaron Gryder	Michael Hushion	Eugene Hauman	1:47.60
1996	Biogio's Rose	Mike Luzzi	Erik Jensen	Alfred Nastasi & Joseph Nastasi	1:44.80
1995	Thunder Achiever	Ramon Perez	Carlos Martin	Flying Zee Stable	1:46.60
1994	Rogues Walk	John R. Velazquez	Ángel Cordero Jr.	Italo Erin Stable	1:45.80
1993	Great Triumph	Nick Santagata	Joseph A. Lostritto	Joseph A. Lostritto	1:41.00
1992	Our Shopping Spree	Chris Antley	Mark J. Reid	Sanandsable Farm	1:25.20
1991	Windswept Wings	Herb McCauley	Andrew Elder	Patricia M. Brown	1:25.60
1990	Fairlee Wild	Craig Perret	Timothy D. Kelly	Boto Stable	1:26.00
1989	Elocat	Jorge Chavez	Robert P. Lake	Arthur I. Klein	1:24.60
1988	Proud Puppy	José A. Santos	Robert P. Lake	Paul E. Labe	1:25.00
1987	Joe's Tammie	Craig Perret	Darrell Vienna	David S. Milch	1:27.00
1986	Chase The Dream	Ángel Cordero Jr.	D. Wayne Lukas	Eugene V. Klein	1:37.00
1985	Sonia's Scamp	Jorge Velásquez	Edward T. Allard	E. G. Campbell	1:39.00
1984	Queen Alexandra	Jean-Luc Samyn	Philip G. Johnson	Mrs. Morton Rosenthal	1:39.20
1983	Diane's Kin	Mike Venezia	Frank Tufariello	Vee Kay Stables	1:39.80
1982	Cyanea	Jorge Velásquez	LeRoy Jolley	Charles Harris II	1:37.20
1981	Cupecoy's Joy	Angel Santiago	Alfredo Callejas	Ri-Ma-Ro Stables & Robert Perez	1:25.20
1980	Petite Nina	Ángel Cordero Jr.	Oscar Barrera	John Muriell	1:26.40
1979	Swirlaway	Jorge Velásquez	Del W. Carroll	William S. Farish III	1:27.00
1978	Hildy's Grey	Darrel McHargue	Frank X. Pagano Jr.	Merry E. Hochman	1:26.80

== Earlier winners & jockey ==
- 1953 – Fisherman (Hedley Woodhouse)
- 1952 – Native Dancer (Eric Guerin)
- 1951 – Tom Fool (Ted Atkinson)
- 1950 – Nullify (Douglas Dodson) †
- 1949 – Selector (Arnold Kirkland)
- 1948 – Sport Page (Eddie Arcaro)
- 1947 – Better Self (Eddie Arcaro)
- 1946 – Grand Admiral (Job Dean Jessop)
- 1945 – Mist o' Gold (Ted Atkinson)
- 1944 – War Jeep (Albert Snider)
- 1943 – Stronghold (John Gilbert)
- 1942 – Gold Shower (Billie Thompson)
- 1941 – Requested (Eddie Arcaro)
- 1940 – Omission (Don Meade)
- 1939 – Williamstown (Don Meade)
- 1938 – Entracte (Sam Renick)
- 1937 – Pasteurized (Wayne D. Wright)
- 1936 – No Sir (Ira Hanford)
- 1935 – Bien Joli (John Gilbert)
- 1934 – Below Zero (Calvin S. Rainey)
- 1933 – Sgt. Byrne (Howard Cruz)
- 1932 – Lucky Chance (Linus McAtee)
- 1931 – Universe (Thomas Malley)
- 1930 – Checkerberry (Raymond Workman)
- 1929 – Mokatam (Laverne Fator)
- 1928 – Lycidas (Edgar Barnes)
- 1927 – Sun Edwin (Eddie Ambrose)
- 1926 – General Lee (Fred Stevens)
- 1925 – Pompey (Charles Fairbrother)
- 1924 – Turf Idol (James H. Burke)
- 1923 – Peter King (Clarence Turner)
- 1922 – Caveat Emptor (Linus McAtee)
- 1921 – Kai-Sang (Earl Sande) †
- 1920 – Ten-Lec (Albert Johnson)
- 1919 – Miss Jemina (Johnny Loftus)
- 1918 – Ute (George Walls)
- 1917 – Cum Sah (Roscoe Troxler)
- 1916 – Tom Taggart (Edward Taplin)
- 1915 – no race
- 1914 – Pebbles (Joe Kederis)
- 1913 – no race
- 1912 – no race
- 1911 – no race
- 1910 – Amalfi (A. Thomas)
- † In 1921, Runstar finished first but was disqualified.
- † In 1950, the race was won by Maine Chance Farm's Win or Lose but who was later disqualified when it was found he had carried an incorrect weight assignment.
