= 2006 Black-Eyed Susan Stakes =

Horse race held at Pimlico Race Course

82nd Black-Eyed Susan Stakes
- Black-Eyed Susan Stakes
- Location: Pimlico Race Course, Baltimore, Maryland, United States
- Date: May 19, 2006
- Winning horse: Regal Engagement
- Jockey: Ramon Dominguez
- Conditions: Fast
- Surface: Dirt

The 2006 Black-Eyed Susan Stakes was the 82nd running of the Black-Eyed Susan Stakes. The race took place in Baltimore, Maryland on May 19, 2006, and was televised in the United States on the Bravo TV network owned by NBC. Ridden by jockey Ramon Dominguez, Regal Engagement, lost the race by two lengths to runner-up Smart N Pretty after being interfered with. Smart N Pretty was taken down and the race was awarded to Regal Engagement. Approximate post time on the evening before the Preakness Stakes was 5:14 p.m. Eastern Time and the race was run for a purse of $250,000. The race was run over a fast track in a final time of 1:50.11. The Maryland Jockey Club reported total attendance of 24,554. The attendance at Pimlico Race Course that day was a record crowd for Black-Eyed Susan Stakes Day.

== Payout ==
The 82nd Black-Eyed Susan Stakes Payout Schedule

Program Number	Horse Name	Win	Place	Show
6	Regal Engagement	$12.40	$6.60	$4.80
2	Smart N Pretty	-	$11.00	$5.60
4	Baghdaria	-	-	$6.00

$2 Exacta: (6–2) paid $24.00

$2 Trifecta: (6–2–4) paid $58.00

$1 Superfecta: (6–2–4–3) paid $138.30

== The full chart ==
Finish Position	Lengths Behind	Post Position	Horse name	Trainer	Jockey	Owner	Post Time Odds	Purse Earnings
1st	31/2	2	Regal Engagement	Thomas Bush	Ramon Dominguez	Mark D. Spitzer	3.00-1	$150,000
2nd	0	6	Smart N Pretty {DQ}	Dale Romans	Norberto Arroyo, Jr.	Classic Star Stable	9.50-1	$50,000
3rd	51/2	4	Baghdaria	Thomas Amoss	Rafael Bejarano	Clinton C. Atkins	10.90-1	$30,000
4th	53/4	3	Gasia	J. Larry Jones	Larry Melancon	Susan Knoll	7.80-1	$15,000
5th	81/4	5	She's an Eleven	John Sadler	Garrett Gomez	C R K Stable	1.10-1 favorite	$7,500
6th	111/4	8	Saratoga Drive	Richard Violette	Javier Castellano	Bart & Marvin Delfiner	4.20-1	
7th	231/4	1	Crystal Current	William Mott	Alex Solis	Kinsman Stable	8.50-1	
8th	dnf	8	Red Cherries Spin	James Jerkins	Javier Castellano	Naveed Chowhan	15.00-1	scratch

- Winning Breeder: Helen & Stewart Armstrong; (KY)
- Final Time: 1:50.11
- Track Condition: Fast
- Total Attendance: 24,554

== See also ==
- 2006 Preakness Stakes
- Black-Eyed Susan Stakes Stakes "top three finishers" and # of starters
