= Two Item Limit =

American-bred Thoroughbred racehorse

- Sire: Twining
- Grandsire: Forty Niner
- Dam: Spa Warning
- Damsire: Caveat
- Sex: Mare
- Foaled: 1998
- Country: United States
- Colour: Bay
- Breeder: Hal Snowden Jr. & Raymond Simpson
- Owner: Joseph F. Graffeo
- Trainer: Stephen L. DiMauro
- Record: 28: 7-3-5
- Earnings: $1,060,585

Major wins
- Demoiselle Stakes (2000); Tempted Stakes (2000); Black-Eyed Susan Stakes (2001); Comely Stakes (2001); Las Virgenes Stakes (2001)

Two Item Limit (foaled in February 1998 in Illinois) is an American Thoroughbred racehorse. The granddaughter of Forty Niner is best remembered for posting a 3-length score in the mile and an eighth Grade II $250,000 Black-Eyed Susan Stakes at Pimlico Race Course on May 18, 2001.

== Early career ==
Two Item Limit was born in February 1998 in Illinois and was bred by Hal Snowden Jr. & Raymond Simpson. She was sold as a two-year-old in training at the Ocala Breeders' Sale in March 2000 to Joseph F. Graffeo.

That fall, she raced in three stakes races all in New York. In her first graded stakes race, she placed second in the grade two Adirondack Stakes at Saratoga Race Course at 6 1/2 furlongs in late August. She then won the grade three Tempted Stakes at one mile at Aqueduct Racetrack in early October. In November, Two Item Limit won the grade two Demoiselle Stakes at Aqueduct run over the dirt at one mile.

== Three-year-old season ==
At age three, Two Item Limit traveled cross country to run in the grade one Las Virgenes Stakes at one mile at Santa Anita Park in March and finished second. She then traveled back 3,000 miles back to her home base at Aqueduct Racetrack and won the grade two Comely Stakes at one mile in mid-April.

Her connections then entered her in the second jewel of America's de facto Filly Triple Crown, the Black-Eyed Susan Stakes. Two Item Limit was the third choice at 3-1 on the morning line in a strong field of five other stakes winners. She was vanned from Belmont Park to Pimlico Race Course in the early hours of the morning of the race and won the 77th running of the Grade II $250,000 Black-Eyed Susan Stakes in a time of 1:50 for the 1 1/8-mile distance. The fractions were :23, :47, 1:12 and 1:38.

Later that year, Two Item Limit ran in the grade one Gazelle Handicap at nine furlongs, placing second, and the grade one Alabama Stakes at one mile and a quarter at Saratoga Race Course, where she placed third. She also ran in the Breeders' Cup Distaff (now the Ladies Classic) at one and one eighth mile in late October 2000.

== Four-year-old season ==
At age four, Two Item limit ran a third in the grade one Ogden Phipps Handicap at 8 1/2 furlongs. She followed that effort up with an identical third-place finish in the $1,000,000 Delaware Handicap at one mile and a quarter at Delaware Park.

== Retirement ==
In January 2003, Two Item Limit was retired and sent to Three Chimneys Farm to breed. In January 2008, she was sold at Keeneland Auction for $525,000.
