= 2015 Black-Eyed Susan Stakes =

Horse race held at Pimlico Race Course

91st Black-Eyed Susan Stakes
- Black-Eyed Susan Stakes
- Location: Pimlico Race Course, Baltimore, Maryland, United States
- Date: May 15, 2015
- Winning horse: Keen Pauline
- Jockey: Javier Castellano
- Conditions: Fast
- Surface: Dirt

The 2015 Black-Eyed Susan Stakes was the 91st running of the Black-Eyed Susan Stakes. The race took place on May 15, 2015, and was televised in the United States on the NBC Sports Network. Ridden by jockey Javier Castellano, Keen Pauline won the race by a two and three-quarter lengths over runner-up Include Betty. Approximate post time on the Friday evening before the Preakness Stakes was 4:52 p.m. Eastern Time. The Maryland Jockey Club supplied a purse of $250,000 for the 91st running. The race was run over a fast track in a final time of 1:50.46. The Maryland Jockey Club reported a Black-Eyed Susan Stakes Day record attendance of 42,700. The attendance at Pimlico Race Course that day was a record crowd for Black-Eyed Susan Stakes Day.

== Payout ==
The 91st Black-Eyed Susan Stakes Payout Schedule

Program Number	Horse Name	Win	Place	Show
9	Keen Pauline	$32.80	$10.80	$5.80
5	Include Betty	-	$5.40	$3.40
3	Ahh Chocolate	-	-	$4.40

$2 Exacta: (9–5) paid $ 211.00

$2 Trifecta: (9–5–3) paid $ 1,356.00

$1 Superfecta: (9–5–3-1) paid $ 1,629.90

== The full chart ==
Finish Position	Lengths Behind	Post Position	Horse name	Trainer	Jockey	Owner	Post Time Odds	Purse Earnings
1st	0	9	Keen Pauline	Dale Romans	Javier Castellano	Stonestreet Stables	15.40-1	$150,000
2nd	2-3/4	5	Include Betty	Thomas Proctor	Drayden Van Dyke	Brereton C. Jones	4.90-1	$50,000
3rd	3-1/4	3	Ahh Chocolate	Neil Howard	Brian Hernandez, Jr.	Stoneway Farm	4.10-1	$30,000
4th	31/2</spa	1	Danessa Deluxe	Jorge Navarro	John R. Velazquez	Gelfenstein Farm	4.60-1	$15,000
5th	71/2	8	Luminance	Bob Baffert	Martin Garcia	Kaleem Shah	1.30-1 favorite	$7,500
6th	73/4	2	Pure	James Cassidy	Victor Espinoza	D. P. Racing, LLC	27.70-1	$2,500
7th	11	6	Sweetgrass	Ian Wilkes	Julien Leparoux	Six Column Stables	10.60-1	
8th	111/2	4	Gypsy Judy	Robin Graham	Horacio Karamanos	James Hibbert	43.80-1	
9th	141/4	7	Devine Aida	Ramon Morales	Jesus Rios	Stronach Stables	17.10-1	

- Winning Breeder: Stonestreet Stables; (KY)
- Final Time: 1:50.46
- Track Condition: Fast
- Total Attendance: Record of 42,700

== See also ==
- 2015 Preakness Stakes
- Black-Eyed Susan Stakes Stakes "top three finishers" and # of starters
