= 2016 Black-Eyed Susan Stakes =

Horse race held at Pimlico Race Course

92nd Black-Eyed Susan Stakes
- Black-Eyed Susan Stakes
- Location: Pimlico Race Course, Baltimore, Maryland, United States
- Date: May 20, 2016
- Winning horse: Go Maggie Go
- Jockey: Javier Castellano
- Conditions: Fast
- Surface: Dirt

The 2016 Black-Eyed Susan Stakes was the 92nd running of the Black-Eyed Susan Stakes. The race took place on May 20, 2016, and was televised in the United States on the NBC Sports Network. Ridden by jockey Luis Saez, Go Maggie Go won the race by a two and one-half lengths over runner-up Ma Can Do It. Approximate post time on the Friday evening before the Preakness Stakes was 4:51 p.m. Eastern Time. The Maryland Jockey Club supplied a purse of $250,000 for the 92nd running. The race was run over a fast track in a final time of 1:51.81. The Maryland Jockey Club reported a Black-Eyed Susan Stakes Day record attendance of 47,956. The attendance at Pimlico Race Course that day was a record crowd for Black-Eyed Susan Stakes Day and the sixth largest for a thoroughbred race in North America in 2016.

== Payout ==
The 92nd Black-Eyed Susan Stakes Payout Schedule

Program Number	Horse Name	Win	Place	Show
5	Go Maggie Go	$5.60	$3.60	$3.00
4	Ma Can Do It	-	$31.40	$15.00
10	Kinsley Kisses	-	-	$4.60

$2 Exacta: (5–4) paid $ 202.20

$2 Trifecta: (5–4–10) paid $ 1,486.60

$1 Superfecta: (5–4–10-2) paid $ 6,212.30

== The full chart ==
Finish Position	Lengths Behind	Post Position	Horse name	Trainer	Jockey	Owner	Post Time Odds	Purse Earnings
1st	0	5	Go Maggie Go	Dale Romans	Luis Saez	Mike Tarp	1.80-1	$150,000
2nd	2-1/2	4	Ma Can Do It	Dale Romans	Brian Hernandez Jr.	Kyle W. Nagel	50.70-1	$50,000
3rd	2-3/4	10	Kinsley Kisses	Todd Pletcher	John Velazquez	Cheyenne Stables	5.00-1	$30,000
4th	3	4	Dothraki Queen	Kenneth McPeek	Julien Leparoux	Magdalena Racing (Sherri McPeek)	9.10-1	$15,000
5th	31/4	14	Mom's On Strike	Joe Sharp	Irad Ortiz, Jr.	XYZ Stable/3C Stable	16.80-1	$7,500
6th	71/4	3	Land Over Sea	Doug O'Neill	Mario Gutierrez	Reddam Racing LLC	1.70-1 favorite	$2,500
7th	71/2	6	She's a Warrior	Peter Eurton	Gary Stevens	C R K Stable	12.10-1	
8th	81/2	7	Downdraft	James Lawrence II	Angel Cruz	Matthew Schera	74.00-1	
9th	15	12	Flora Dora	Marialice Coffey	Junior Alvarado	Coffeepot Stables	74.10-1	
10th	23	9	Midnight On Oconee	J. Larry Jones	Gabriel Saez	Cottonwood Stables LLC	29.90-1	
11th	251/4	1	A P Majetstic	Michael Trombetta	Victor Carrasco	Triple Threat LLC	162.90-1	
12th	251/2	8	Double Entendre	Peter Walder	Javier Castellano	Loooch Racing Stables	50.60-1	
13th	Scr.	11	Cced				Scr.	
14th	Scr.	13	In the Navy Now				Scr.	

- Winning Breeder: Mike Tarp; (KY)
- Final Time: 1:51.81
- Track Condition: Fast
- Total Attendance: Record of 47,956

== See also ==
- 2016 Preakness Stakes
- Black-Eyed Susan Stakes Stakes "top three finishers" and # of starters
