= 2010 Black-Eyed Susan Stakes =

Horse race held at Pimlico Race Course

86th Black-Eyed Susan Stakes
- Black-Eyed Susan Stakes
- Location: Pimlico Race Course, Baltimore, Maryland, United States
- Date: May 14, 2010
- Winning horse: Acting Happy
- Jockey: Jose Lezcano
- Conditions: Fast
- Surface: Dirt

The 2010 Black-Eyed Susan Stakes was the 86th running of the Black-Eyed Susan Stakes. The race took place in Baltimore, Maryland on May 14, 2010, and was televised in the United States on the Bravo TV network owned by NBC. Ridden by jockey Jose Lezcano, Acting Happy, won the race by one and a half lengths over runner-up No Such Word. Approximate post time on the evening before the Preakness Stakes was 5:50 p.m. Eastern Time and the race was run for a purse of $200,000. The race was run over a fast track in a final time of 1:50.00. The Maryland Jockey Club reported total attendance of 27,609. The attendance at Pimlico Race Course that day was a record crowd for Black-Eyed Susan Stakes Day.

== Payout ==
The 86th Black-Eyed Susan Stakes Payout Schedule

Program Number	Horse Name	Win	Place	Show
4	Acting Happy	$22.20	$10.80	$5.80
1	No Such Word	-	$9.00	$5.60
6	Tidal Pool	-	-	$2.60

$2 Exacta: (4–1) paid $166.80

$2 Trifecta: (4–1–6) paid $640.20

$1 Superfecta: (4–1–6–5) paid $1,532.20

== The full chart ==
Finish Position	Lengths Behind	Post Position	Horse name	Trainer	Jockey	Owner	Post Time Odds	Purse Earnings
1st	0	4	Acting Happy	Richard E. Dutrow	Jose Lezcano	Jay Em Ess Stable	10.10-1	$120,000
2nd	11/2	1	No Such Word	Cindy Jones	Terry Thompson	Brereton C. Jones	8.10-1	$40,000
3rd	33/4	6	Tidal Pool	D. Wayne Lukas	Calvin Borel	Westrock Stables, LLC	2.00-1 favorite	$20,000
4th	41/4	5	Harissa	Michael Hushion	Tyler Baze	Gem, Inc. (Waken)	4.10-1	$12,000
5th	101/4	3	Khancord Kid	John C. Kimmel	Rajiv Maragh	Chester & Mary Broman	23.50-1	$6,000
6th	101/2	8	C. C.'s Pal	Richard E. Dutrow	Eibar Coa	Eric Fein	38.00-1	
7th	103/4	7	Patriot Miss	Rodney Jenkins	Travis Dunkelberger	Lazy Lane Farms, Inc.	59.60-1	
8th	421/2	2	Seeking the Title	Dallas Stewart	Kent J. Desormeaux	Charles E. Fipke	2.40-1	
9th	dnf	9	Diva Delight	Ian R. Wilkes	Julien Leparoux	Cloverleaf Farm II, Inc.	6.50-1	

- Winning Breeder: Samantha & Mace Siegel; (KY)
- Final Time: 1:50.00
- Track Condition: Fast
- Total Attendance: 27,609

== See also ==
- 2010 Preakness Stakes
- Black-Eyed Susan Stakes Stakes "top three finishers" and # of starters
