= Miss Legality =

American-bred Thoroughbred racehorse

- Sire: Skip Trial
- Grandsire: Bailjumper
- Dam: Jongleuse
- Damsire: African Sky
- Sex: Mare
- Foaled: 1989
- Country: United States
- Colour: Bay
- Breeder: Norton Waltuch
- Owner: Norton Waltuch
- Trainer: Sonny Hine
- Record: 17: 7-2-2
- Earnings: $378,739

Major wins
- Gardenia Stakes (1991); Black-Eyed Susan Stakes (1992); Davona Dale Stakes (1992); Brave Raj Stakes (1992); Convenience Stakes (1992); Somerset County Stakes (1992)
- Last updated on July 3, 2011

Miss Legality (foaled in 1989 in Florida) is an American Thoroughbred racehorse. The daughter of Skip Trial is probably best remembered for posting a two length score over Known Feminist in the mile and an eighth Grade II $250,000 Black-Eyed Susan Stakes at Pimlico Race Course on May 15, 1992.

== Early racing career ==
Miss Legality broke her maiden in her second attempt and then won an allowance race at Calder Race Course in June 1992. In the late summer, she competed in the Poinsettia Stakes at Hialeah Park Race Track and placed second behind November Snow. Late in the summer, she took another second by placing in the Sorority Stakes at Monmouth Park in New Jersey. In late September, Miss Legality won the Brave Raj Stakes, also at Calder in Miami Gardens, Florida. It was open to two-year-old fillies and raced over a distance of one mile and seventy yards. During the second week of November, Miss Legality won the very last running of the Gardenia Stakes run at Garden State Park Racetrack near Cherry Hill, New Jersey. At the time, the 1-1/16 mile event was the world's richest race for two-year-old fillies. In the winter, Miss Legality was freshened for a few months. In March 1992, she won the Davona Dale Stakes at Gulfstream Park at a mile and 70 yards in 1:42 flat.

== Black-Eyed Susan Stakes ==
In the late spring of 1992, owner Norton Waltuch and trainer Sonny Hine decided to run Miss Legality in the de facto second jewel of the filly Triple Crown, the Grade II $250,000 Black-Eyed Susan Stakes in May. In the race, Miss Legality broke well and overtook the leaders going into the clubhouse turn. She beat a strong field of eight stakes winners, including runner-up Known Feminist, by 1-1/2 lengths in the 68th running of the Black-Eyed Susan Stakes in Baltimore, Maryland. Miss Legality, ridden by jockey Chris McCarron, covered 1 1/8 miles in the rain in one minute and 51.11 seconds. Diamond Duo was two lengths further back in third.

== Later racing career ==
After the Black-Eyed Susan, Miss Legality was shipped to the Jersey shore to race in the Post-Deb Stakes (now called the Reeve Schley, Jr. Stakes) in July at Monmouth Park. In the Post-Deb, Diamond Duo turned the tables and won the race, with Miss Legality finishing third. She finished her sophomore season with wins in the Convenience Stakes and Somerset County Stakes.
