= Added Gold =

American-bred Thoroughbred racehorse

- Sire: Gilded Time
- Grandsire: Timeless Moment
- Dam: Added Elegance
- Damsire: Stutz Blackhawk
- Sex: Mare
- Foaled: 1995
- Country: United States
- Colour: Chestnut
- Breeder: Wimborne Farm
- Owner: Stonerside Stable, LLC
- Trainer: John P. Campo
- Record: 11: 4-2-1
- Earnings: $222,000

Major wins
- Black-Eyed Susan Stakes (1998)
- Last updated on June 25, 2011

Added Gold (foaled in 1995 in Kentucky) is an American Thoroughbred racehorse. The daughter of Gilded Time is remembered for winning the mile and an eighth Grade II $200,000 Black-Eyed Susan Stakes at Pimlico Race Course on May 15, 1998.

== Racing career ==
Added Gold won a maiden outing and an allowance race before competing in the second jewel of the de facto filly Triple Crown, the Grade II $200,000 Black-Eyed Susan Stakes on May 15, 1998. In that mile and an eighth race on the dirt, she Gold beat a field of eight, including stakes winners Tappin Ginger and Hansel's Girl.

Added Gold finished her racing career with four wins and a record of 4-2-1 out of 11 starts with earnings of $222,000.
