= Chamrousse (horse) =

American-bred Thoroughbred racehorse

- Sire: Peaks and Valleys
- Grandsire: Mt. Livermore
- Dam: Loose Park
- Damsire: Stop the Music
- Sex: Mare
- Foaled: 1999
- Country: United States
- Colour: Bay
- Breeder: Arthur B. Hancock III & James H. Stone
- Owner: Arthur B. Hancock III
- Trainer: Niall O'Callaghan
- Record: 8: 4-1-3
- Earnings: $359,585

Major wins
- Black-Eyed Susan Stakes (2002)
- Last updated on June 18, 2011

Chamrousse (foaled in February 1999 in Kentucky) is an American Thoroughbred racehorse. She won four of her five starts and finished in the money in each of her eight outings. The daughter of Peaks and Valleys is best remembered for posting a two a half length score as the favorite in the mile and an eighth Grade II $200,000 Black-Eyed Susan Stakes at Pimlico Race Course on May 17, 2002.

== Racing career ==
Chamrousse had a very brief racing career, making it to the track only eight times over ten months before being retired. After breaking her maiden in November 2001, she won an allowance race at Fair Grounds Race Course in January 2002. In early February 2002, she raced in the grade three Silverbulletday Stakes at Fair Grounds Race Course at a mile and one sixteenth and finished third to Take Charge Lady. In March, Chamrousse finished third again to Take Charge Lady in the grade two Fair Grounds Oaks at Fair Grounds, again at a mile and one sixteenth. In April, she finished third in her third straight graded stakes race in the grade two Fantasy Stakes at Oaklawn Park to See How She Runs at a mile and one sixteenth.

Trainer Niall O'Callaghan and owner Arthur B. Hancock III opted to give her a small break and skipped the Kentucky Oaks. But on the third Saturday of May, her connections sent her to the de facto second leg of the Filly Triple Crown, the Grade II $200,000 Black-Eyed Susan Stakes at Pimlico Race Course. When the gates opened, a 24-1 longshot Shop Till You Drop was sent to the lead by jockey Harry Vega and posted initial fractions of 23.5, 47.5, and 1:12.4. Chamrousse went off as the 3-5 post time favorite and stalked her. With a patient rating trip under jockey Jerry Bailey, she made her move at the top of the stretch, dueled briefly with the pacesetter at the three sixteenth pole, and drew off to win by two and a half widening lengths, stopping the clock in 1:51.61 for the one mile and one eighth mile feature. Autumn Creek, at 8-1, finished eleven lengths back in third. Winning jockey Jerry Bailey said, "I've never ridden her before, but I ride them better that way."

In the last week of June, Chamrousse finished second in the grade one Mother Goose Stakes at Belmont Park at 1 mile and 1/8.
