= Valley Stream Stakes =

Flat Horse Race

The Valley Stream Stakes was a flat horse race for Thoroughbred two-year-old fillies. It was raced over a distance of 6 furlongs on dirt at Aqueduct Racetrack in Jamaica, New York.

The race was discontinued after the 2005 running.

== Winners ==
Year	Winner	Jockey	Trainer	Time	Grade
2005	Miraculous Miss	Ramon Dominguez	Steve Klesaris	1:11.13	III
2004	Megascape	John Velazquez	Steven Asmussen	1:10.38	III
2003	Smokey Glacken	José A. Santos	James Jerkens	1:11.18	III
2002	Randaroo	John Velazquez	Anthony Dutrow	1:09.46	III
2001	Forest Heiress	Richard Migliore	Benjamin Perkins Jr.	1:08.66	III
