= George E. Mitchell Black-Eyed Susan Stakes =

American Thoroughbred stakes horse race

- "The Second Jewel of the Filly Triple Crown"
- Class: Grade II
- Location: Pimlico Race Course, Baltimore, Maryland; United States
- Inaugurated: 1919 as Pimlico Oaks
- Race type: Thoroughbred - Flat racing

Race information
- Distance: 1 1/8 miles (9 furlongs)
- Surface: Dirt
- Track: left-handed
- Qualification: Three-year-old fillies
- Weight: 124 lbs. with allowances
- Purse: $300,000 (2024)

The George E. Mitchell Black-Eyed Susan Stakes (known as the Black-Eyed Susan Stakes from 1952 through 2019 and first run as the Pimlico Oaks) is a Grade II American Thoroughbred horse race for three-year-old fillies run over a distance of 1 1/8 miles on the dirt annually at Pimlico Race Course in Baltimore, Maryland. The event currently offers a purse of $300,000.

== History ==
The event was inaugurated in 1919 as the Pimlico Oaks. The inaugural edition was won by Milkmaid who went on to earn United States Champion 3-Yr-Old Filly honors. Milkmaid's owner J. K. L. Ross had a very good 1919 racing campaign, also winning the first U.S. Triple Crown with the colt Sir Barton.

The Pimlico Oaks was renamed in 1952 to the Black-Eyed Susan Stakes to acknowledge the state flower of Maryland. The Black-Eyed Susan was given graded stakes race status in 1973.

Twenty-three fillies that won The Black-Eyed Susan went on to be named a Champion according to the Maryland Jockey Club, those fillies include; Royal Delta, Silverbulletday, Serena's Song, Family Style, Davona Dale, What a Summer, My Juliet, Office Queen, Process Shot, Airmans Guide, High Voltage, Real Delight, Wistful III, But Why Not, Gallorette, Twilight Tear, Vagrancy, Fairy Chant, Nellie Morse, Maid at Arms, Careful, Cleopatra and Milkmaid.

Davona Dale is the only filly to win the Black-Eyed Susan Stakes, Kentucky Oaks, Acorn Stakes, Mother Goose Stakes, and Coaching Club American Oaks. Nellie Morse is the only winner to also win the Preakness Stakes.

In August 2020 during the COVID-19 pandemic it was announced that the Black-Eyed Susan Stakes would be run on the undercard of the Preakness Stakes, which had been moved to October. Shortly before the race was run in 2020 it was renamed to honor the late George E. Mitchell, a longtime community leader in the Park Heights neighborhood.

== Filly Triple Crown ==
In its 100th running for 2024, the George E. Mitchell Black-Eyed Susan Stakes is one of three races that are the de facto distaff counterparts to the Triple Crown races, along with the Kentucky Oaks at Churchill Downs and the Acorn Stakes at Belmont Park. These races have been unofficially referred to as the "Filly Triple Crown." Three races run at Belmont and Saratoga Race Course in New York are also called the Triple Tiara to avoid trademark conflicts. However, consideration has been given within the National Thoroughbred Racing Association (NTRA), the sport's governing body in the United States, to change the Triple Tiara series to the Kentucky Oaks, the Black-Eyed Susan Stakes and the Mother Goose Stakes.

== Records ==
Speed record:

- 1-1/8 miles - 1:47.83 - Silverbulletday (1999)
- 1-1/16 miles - 1:41 2/5 - Lucky Lucky Lucky (1984)

Most wins by a jockey:

- 5 - John R. Velazquez (1998, 2003, 2005, 2012 & 2024)

Most wins by a trainer:

- 4 - D. Wayne Lukas (1984, 1986, 1989 & 1995)
- 4 - Todd A. Pletcher (2005, 2007, 2012 & 2014)

Most wins by an owner:

- 5 - Calumet Farm (1944, 1949, 1952, 1957, 1979)

== Winners ==
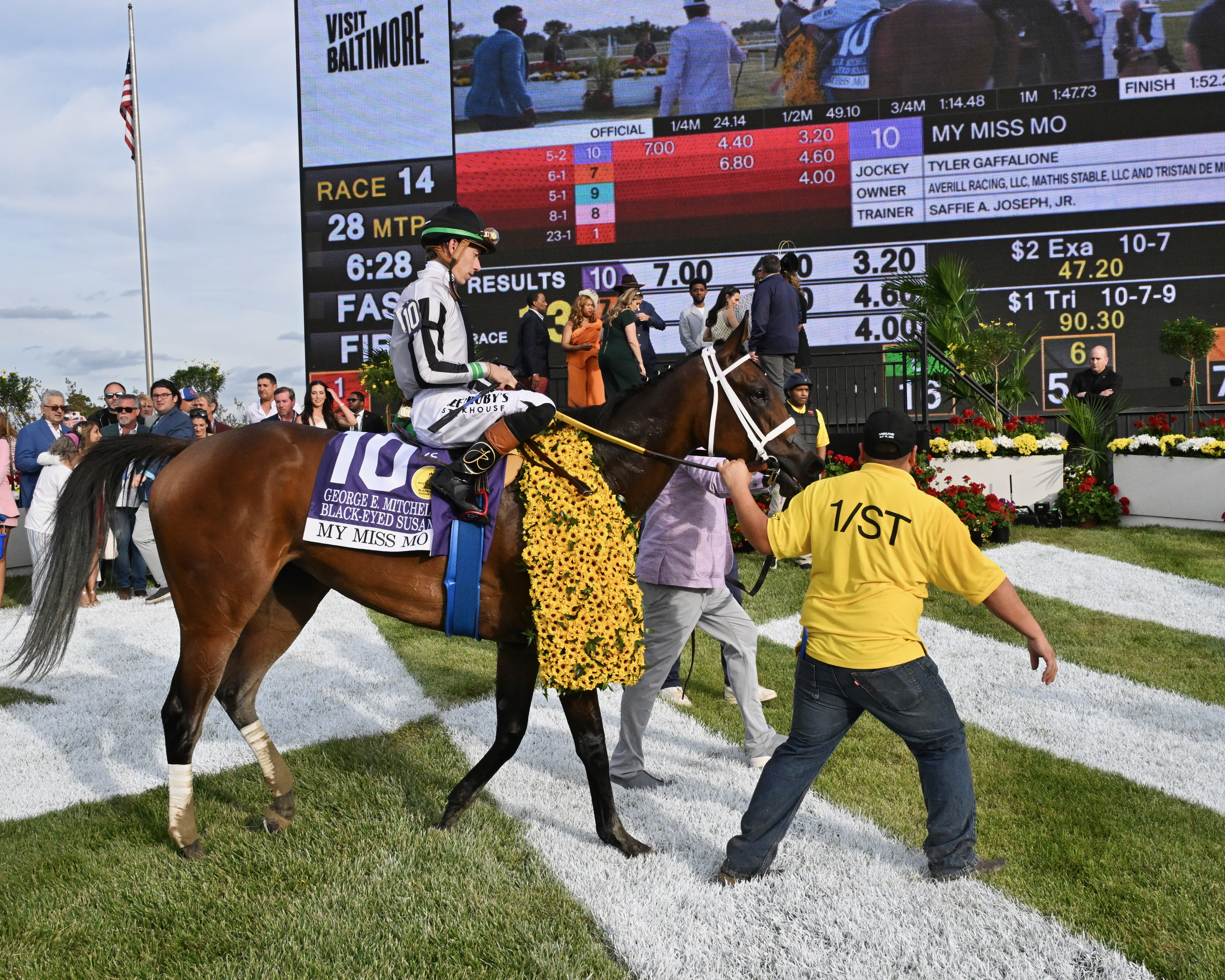
My Miss Mo, the most recent winner of the Black-Eyed Susan Stakes

Year	Winner	Jockey	Trainer	Owner	Distance	Time	Purse	Grade
2026	My Miss Mo	Tyler Gaffalione	Saffie A. Joseph Jr.	Averill Racing, LLC, Mathis Stable, LLC & Tristian De Meric	1 1/8 miles	1:52.15	$300,000	II
2025	Margie's Intention	Flavien Prat	Brad H. Cox	WinStar Farm & Baron Stable	1 1/8 miles	1:52.05	$300,000	II
2024	Gun Song	John R. Velazquez	Mark A. Hennig	R. Lee Lewis	1 1/8 miles	1:51.39	$300,000	II
2023	Taxed	Rafael Bejarano	Randy L. Morse	NET Racing, Michael Dubb, First Row Partners & Team Hanley	1 1/8 miles	1:49.45	$250,000	II
2022	Interstatedaydream	Florent Geroux	Brad H. Cox	Flurry Racing Stables	1 1/8 miles	1:48.73	$250,000	II
2021	Army Wife	Joel Rosario	Michael J. Maker	Three Diamonds Farm	1 1/8 miles	1:49.63	$250,000	II
2020	Miss Marissa	Daniel E. Centeno	James T. Ryerson	Alfonso Cammarota	1 1/8 miles	1:48.08	$250,000	II
2019	Point of Honor	Javier Castellano	George Weaver	Eclipse Thoroughbred Partners	1 1/8 miles	1:47.88	$250,000	II
2018	Red Ruby	Paco Lopez	Kellyn Gorder	Steven Nicholson	1 1/8 miles	1:50.17	$300,000	II
2017	Actress	Nik Juarez	Jason Servis	Gary & Mary West	1 1/8 miles	1:51.87	$300,000	II
2016	Go Maggie Go	Luis Saez	Dale L. Romans	Mike Tarp	1 1/8 miles	1:51.81	$250,000	II
2015	Keen Pauline	Javier Castellano	Dale L. Romans	Stonestreet Stables	1 1/8 miles	1:50.46	$250,000	II
2014	Stopchargingmaria	Javier Castellano	Todd A. Pletcher	Mike Repole	1 1/8 miles	1:51.79	$500,000	II
2013	Fiftyshadesofhay	Joel Rosario	Bob Baffert	Mike Pegram & Karl Watson	1 1/8 miles	1:52.73	$500,000	II
2012	In Lingerie	John R. Velazquez	Todd A. Pletcher	Gary Barber & Eclipse Thoroughbreds	1 1/8 miles	1:52.07	$300,000	II
2011	**Royal Delta**	Jose Lezcano	William I. Mott	Palides Investments	1 1/8 miles	1:49.60	$250,000	II
2010	Acting Happy	Jose Lezcano	Richard Dutrow Jr.	Jay Em Ess Stable	1 1/8 miles	1:50.00	$200,000	II
2009	Payton d'Oro	Terry Thompson	J. Larry Jones	John Ferris & M. Presley	1 1/8 miles	1:49.75	$150,000	II
2008	Sweet Vendetta	Channing Hill	Gary C. Contessa	Team Penney Racing	1 1/8 miles	1:49:60	$150,000	II
2007	Panty Raid	Edgar Prado	Todd A. Pletcher	Glencrest Farm, LLC	1 1/8 miles	1:50.07	$250,000	II
2006	Regal Engagement †	Ramon Dominguez	Thomas M. Bush	Mark D. Spitzer	1 1/8 miles	1:50.11	$250,000	II
2005	Spun Sugar	John R. Velazquez	Todd A. Pletcher	Frank Stronach	1 1/8 miles	1:53.27	$200,000	II
2004	Yearly Report	Jerry Bailey	Bob Baffert	Golden Eagle Farm	1 1/8 miles	1:52.65	$200,000	II
2003	Roar Emotion	John R. Velazquez	Carlos A. Martin	H. Joseph Allen	1 1/8 miles	1:52.33	$200,000	II
2002	Chamrousse	Jerry Bailey	Niall O'Callaghan	Arthur B. Hancock III & James Stone	1 1/8 miles	1:51.61	$200,000	II
2001	Two Item Limit	Richard Migliore	Stephen L. DiMauro	Joseph F. Graffeo	1 1/8 miles	1:50.84	$200,000	II
2000	Jostle	Kent Desormeaux	John Servis	Fox Hill Farms Inc. (Richard C. Porter II)	1 1/8 miles	1:52.56	$200,000	II
1999	**Silverbulletday**	Gary Stevens	Bob Baffert	Mike Pegram	1 1/8 miles	1:47.83	$200,000	II
1998	Added Gold	John R. Velazquez	John P. Campo	Stonerside Stable	1 1/8 miles	1:49.75	$200,000	II
1997	Salt It	Carlos H. Marquez Jr.	Deborah Bodner	Deborah Bodner	1 1/8 miles	1:50.52	$200,000	II
1996	Mesabi Maiden	Mike E. Smith	Shug McGaughey	Stuart S. Janney III	1 1/8 miles	1:51.00	$200,000	II
1995	**Serena's Song**	Gary Stevens	D. Wayne Lukas	Robert B. Lewis & Beverly Lewis	1 1/8 miles	1:48.45	$200,000	II
1994	Calipha	Rick Wilson	Bud Delp	Nancy Bayard	1 1/8 miles	1:51.12	$200,000	II
1993	Aztec Hill	Mike E. Smith	Tom Bohannan	Loblolly Stable	1 1/8 miles	1:49.78	$200,000	II
1992	Miss Legality	Chris McCarron	Sonny Hine	Norton Waltuch	1 1/8 miles	1:51.11	$250,000	II
1991	Wide Country	Santos N. Chavez	Robert W. Camac	Tommy Tanner	1 1/8 miles	1:51.26	$250,000	II
1990	Charon	Craig Perret	Eugene Navarro	Stanley M. Ersoff	1 1/8 miles	1:48.40	$250,000	II
1989	Imaginary Lady	Gary Stevens	D. Wayne Lukas	Joe & Marion Conrad	1 1/8 miles	1:48.20	$250,000	II
1988	Costly Shoes	Pat Day	Ross Pearce	Buckland Farm	1 1/16 miles	1:44.80	$150,000	II
1987	Grecian Flight	Craig Perret	Joseph H. Pierce Jr.	Henry C. B. Lindh	1 1/16 miles	1:44.20	$150,000	II
1986	Family Style	Chris McCarron	D. Wayne Lukas	Eugene V. Klein	1 1/16 miles	1:43.60	$150,000	II
1985	Koluctoos Jill	Chris McCarron	Bruce N. Levine	Brandy Hills Farm (Robert L. Levine)	1 1/16 miles	1:43.00	$150,000	II
1984	Lucky Lucky Lucky	Angel Cordero Jr.	D. Wayne Lukas	Leslie Combs III	1 1/16 miles	1:41.20	$150,000	II
1983	Batna	Lisa D. Ruch	Glenn L. Ballenger	Gordon Grayson	1 1/16 miles	1:42.40	$125,000	II
1982	Delicate Ice	Don Brumfield	James W. Murphy	Stephen N. Connor	1 1/16 miles	1:44.60	$125,000	II
1981	Dame Mysterieuse	Eddie Maple	Woody Stephens	Hickory Tree Stable	1 1/16 miles	1:44.20	$125,000	II
1980	Weber City Miss	Vincent Bracciale Jr.	Howard M. Tesher	H. Joseph Allen	1 1/16 miles	1:44.40	$125,000	II
1979	**Davona Dale**	Jorge Velásquez	John M. Veitch	Calumet Farm	1 1/16 miles	1:42.60	$125,000	II
1978	Caesars Wish	Danny Ray Wright	Richard W. Small	Sally M. Gibson	1 1/16 miles	1:44.20	$91,850	II
1977	Small Raja	Angel Cordero Jr.	Thomas J. Kelly	David P. Reynolds	1 1/16 miles	1:42.80	$91,850	II
1976	What A Summer	Chris McCarron	Bud Delp	Milton Polinger	1 1/16 miles	1:42.40	$63,150	II
1975	My Juliet	Alan Hill	Eugene Euster	George Weasel Jr.	1 1/16 miles	1:44.00	$63,150	II
1974	Blowing Rock	Anthony Agnello	Woody Stephens	Edward Fanning	1 1/16 miles	1:43.00	$39,600	II
1973	Fish Wife	Dan Gargan	George T. Poole	Cornelius V. Whitney	1 1/16 miles	1:44.00	$39,600	II
1972	Summer Guest	Ron Turcotte	Lucien Laurin	Rokeby Stable	1 1/16 miles	1:44.00	$37,800	
1971	At Arm's Length	Ronnie Barnes	Ned Allard	Larking Hill Farm (Fendall M. Clagett)	1 1/16 miles	1:43.20	$37,800	
1970	**Office Queen**	Carlos H. Marquez Sr.	Budd Lepman	Stephen A. Calder	1 1/16 miles	1:43.80	$37,800	
1969	Process Shot	Chuck Baltazar	J. Bowes Bond	Elberon Farm	1 1/16 miles	1:44.00	$37,800	
1968	Singing Rain	Garth Patterson	Oscar White	Walter M. Jeffords Jr.	1 1/16 miles	1:44.20	$37,800	
1967	Farest Nan	Oswaldo Rosado	Eugene Giuffra	June M. Benson	1 1/16 miles	1:44.00	$31,500	
1966	Holly - O	Joe Culmone	Robert W. Camac	Guy H. Burt	1 1/16 miles	1:44.80	$31,500	
1965	Sue Baru	Ronnie Witmer	John D. Boruff	Mrs. Donelson Christmas	1 1/16 miles	1:48.40	$26,000	
1964	Bold Queen	Tommy Lee	William C. Winfrey	Wheatley Stable	1 1/16 miles	1:47.00	$26,650	
1963	Nalee	Wayne Chambers	Horatio Luro	Vernon G. Cardy	1 1/16 miles	1:46.80	$26,650	
1962	Batter Up	Larry Adams	Jim Fitzsimmons	Wheatley Stable	1 1/16 miles	1:45.80	$27,000	
1961	Funloving	Bobby Ussery	Jim Fitzsimmons	Ogden Phipps	1 1/16 miles	1:45.80	$26,650	
1960	**Airmans Guide**	Willie Harmatz	Burton B. Williams	Hugh A. Grant Sr.	1 1/16 miles	1:46.20	$24,750	
1959	Toluene	Karl Korte	Yevgeni Gottlieb	Elmendorf Farm	1 1/16 miles	1:48.80	$25,000	
1958	Daumay	Chris Rogers	Steve S. Birosak	Howard A. Jones	1 1/16 miles	1:46.60	$27,000	
1957	Pillow Talk	Bill Hartack	Maurice H. Dudley	Hal Price Headley	1 1/16 miles	1:45.00	$29,000	
1956	Princess Turia	Bill Hartack	Jimmy Jones	Calumet Farm	1 1/16 miles	1:45.60	$25,800	
1955	High Voltage	Eddie Arcaro	Jim Fitzsimmons	Wheatley Stable	1 1/16 miles	1:46.20	$28,500	
1954	Queen Hopeful	Eddie Arcaro	Harry Trotsek	Hasty House Farm (Allie E. Reuben)	1 1/16 miles	1:45.80	$27,500	
1953	Spinning Top	Charlie Burr	J. Bowes Bond	John S. Phipps	1 1/16 miles	1:47.20	$30,000	
1952	**Real Delight**	Eddie Arcaro	Horace A. Jones	Calumet Farm	1 1/8 miles	1:51.80	$27,500	
1951	Discreet	George Hettinger	William F. Mulholland	George D. Widener Jr.	1 3/16 miles	2:01.20	$14,000	
1950	Race not held							
1949	**Wistful**	Steve Brooks	Horace A. Jones	Calumet Farm	1 1/16 miles	1:44.40	$17,000	
1948	Scattered	Warren Mehrtens	Max Hirsch	King Ranch	1 1/16 miles	1:50.60	$18,000	
1947	**But Why Not**	Warren Mehrtens	Max Hirsch	King Ranch	1 1/16 miles	1:46.40	$24,250	
1946	Red Shoes	Carson Kirk	Thomas D. Rodrock	Howell E. Jackson III	1 1/16 miles	1:49.40	$32,650	
1945	**Gallorette**	George Woolf	Edward Christmas	William L. Brann	1 1/16 miles	1:44.40	$33,500	
1944	**Twilight Tear**	Conn McCreary	Ben A. Jones	Calumet Farm	1 1/16 miles	1:45.20	$27,350	
1943	Askmenow	Carroll Bierman	Kenneth Osborne	Hal Price Headley	1 1/16 miles	1:45.80	$17,000	
1942	**Vagrancy**	Tommy Malley	Jim Fitzsimmons	Belair Stud Farm	1 1/16 miles	1:45.60	$16,300	
1941	Cis Marion	G. Smith	R. Thomas Smith	Ella K. Bryson	1 1/16 miles	1:45.60	$16,300	
1940	**Fairy Chant**	Ralph Neves	Richard E. Handlen	Foxcatcher Farm	1 1/16 miles	1:49.80	$19,200	
1939	Alms	Charley Stevenson	Anthony Pelleteri	Mrs. Anthony Pelleteri	1 1/16 miles	1:47.80	$17,000	
1938	Sketchbook	Nick Wall	Jules Wessler	William J. Hirsch	1 1/16 miles	1:45.20	$14,000	
1937	Sweet Desire	Willie Saunders	George Conway	Glen Riddle Farm	1 1/8 miles	1:54.80	$3,875	
1932	1936	Race not held						
1931	Dark Magnet	Alfred Robertson	Andy Schuttinger	Willis Sharpe Kilmer	1 1/16 miles	1:47.00	$4,650	
1930	Flimsy	Alfred Robertson	Fred Hopkins	Harry Payne Whitney	1 mi 70 yds	1:45.00	$8,300	
1929	Altitude	George Fields	Robert Augustus Smith	Audley Farm Stable	1 1/16 miles	1:49.60	$7,950	
1928	Princess Tina	George Fields	Robert Augustus Smith	Audley Farm Stable	1 1/16 miles	1:46.40	$7,000	
1927	Pandera	Whitey Abel	Fred Hopkins	Harry Payne Whitney	1 1/16 miles	1:48.40	$7,415	
1926	Rapture	George Ellis	James G. Rowe Sr.	Harry Payne Whitney	1 1/16 miles	1:45.80	$7,380	
1925	**Maid at Arms**	Albert Johnson	George Conway	Samuel Riddle	1 1/16 miles	1:46.00	$7,380	
1924	**Nellie Morse**	John Mérimée	Alex Gordon	Bud Fisher	1 1/16 miles	1:48.00	$6,250	
1923	Gadfly	Linus McAtee	James G. Rowe Sr.	Harry Payne Whitney	1 1/16 miles	1:46.60	$8,085	
1922	Dinahmeur	Albert Johnson	Eugene Wayland	Willis Sharpe Kilmer	1 1/16 miles	1:47.00	$6,425	
1921	Careful	Frank Keogh	Eugene Wayland	Walter J. Salmon Sr.	1 1/16 miles	1:49.80	$6,000	
1920	**Cleopatra**	Linus McAtee	William H. Karrick	William R. Coe	1 1/16 miles	1:53.00	$6,100	
1919	**Milkmaid**	Earl Sande	John E. Madden	J.K.L. Ross	1 1/16 miles	1:51.40	$6,100	

Notes:
† Smart N Pretty won the 2006 race but was disqualified from first place for interference.
The 16 fillies whose name appear in Bold were named either (14) American Champion Three-Year-Old Filly or (8) American Champion Older Female Horse and in (6) cases they were named Champion in both divisions.

== See also ==
- Black-Eyed Susan Stakes "top three finishers" and # of starters
- American thoroughbred racing top attended events
