= Regal Engagement =

American-bred Thoroughbred racehorse

- Sire: Cat Thief
- Grandsire: Storm Cat
- Dam: Puestera
- Damsire: Forty Niner
- Sex: Mare
- Foaled: 2003
- Country: United States
- Colour: Chestnut
- Breeder: Helen C. Alexander & Stewart Armstrong
- Owner: Mark D. Spitzer
- Trainer: Carlos Martin
- Record: 7: 3-2-0
- Earnings: $257,980

Major wins
- Black-Eyed Susan Stakes (2006); Busher Stakes (2006)
- Last updated on June 17, 2011

Regal Engagement (foaled in February 2003 in Kentucky) is an American Thoroughbred racehorse. The daughter of Cat Thief and granddaughter of both Storm Cat and Forty Niner is probably remembered for her score in the mile and an eighth Grade II $250,000 Black-Eyed Susan Stakes at Pimlico Race Course on May 19, 2006.

== Three-year-old season ==
In late 2005, Regal Engagement broke her maiden in her second race at Aqueduct Racetrack. She came back in February in the 1 1/16 mile (8.5 furlongs) Busher Stakes for three-year-old fillies, winning under jockey Ramon Dominguez in 1:47.15 (a very slow time). In mid-April, she placed second to Miraculous Miss in the grade two Comely Stakes at one mile at Aqueduct Racetrack.

== Black-Eyed Susan Stakes ==
Her connections skipped the Kentucky Oaks and entered the second jewel of America's de facto Filly Triple Crown, the Black-Eyed Susan Stakes. In the stretch, Regal Engagement drew even with pacesetter Smart N Pretty, who drifted out, bumping Regal Engagement before shaking her off to finish three lengths clear. The bumping incident drew a steward's inquiry and an objection by Regal Engagement's rider, Ramon Dominguez. The stewards disqualified Smart N Pretty and placed her second, awarding the victory to Regal Engagement. It was 2 lengths back to Baghdaria in third, while favorite She's an Eleven failed to rally and finished fifth.

== Retirement ==
In 2007, Regal Engagement was retired and purchased at the Keeneland November sale. In 2008, she had a foal by A.P. Indy.

== Pedigree ==
Pedigree of Regal Engagement
Sire Cat Thief ch 1996	Storm Cat br 1983	Storm Bird	Northern Dancer
Sire Cat Thief ch 1996	Storm Cat br 1983	Storm Bird	South Ocean
Sire Cat Thief ch 1996	Storm Cat br 1983	Terlingua	Secretariat
Sire Cat Thief ch 1996	Storm Cat br 1983	Terlingua	Crimson Saint
Sire Cat Thief ch 1996	Train Robbery ch 1987	Alydar	Raise a Native
Sire Cat Thief ch 1996	Train Robbery ch 1987	Alydar	No Robbery
Sire Cat Thief ch 1996	Train Robbery ch 1987	Track Robbery	Left at Home
Sire Cat Thief ch 1996	Train Robbery ch 1987	Track Robbery	Raise a Native
Dam Puestera ch 1994	Forty Niner ch 1985	Mr Prospector	Gold Digger
Dam Puestera ch 1994	Forty Niner ch 1985	Mr Prospector	Tom Rolfe
Dam Puestera ch 1994	Forty Niner ch 1985	File	Continue
Dam Puestera ch 1994	Forty Niner ch 1985	File	Meadow Blue
Dam Puestera ch 1994	Too Chic bay 1989	Blushing Groom	Red God
Dam Puestera ch 1994	Too Chic bay 1989	Blushing Groom	Runaway Bride
Dam Puestera ch 1994	Too Chic bay 1989	Remedia	Dr Fager
Dam Puestera ch 1994	Too Chic bay 1989	Remedia	Monade
