= 2014 Black-Eyed Susan Stakes =

Horse race held at Pimlico Race Course

90th Black-Eyed Susan Stakes
- Black-Eyed Susan Stakes
- Location: Pimlico Race Course, Baltimore, Maryland, United States
- Date: May 16, 2014
- Winning horse: Stopchargingmaria
- Jockey: Javier Castellano
- Conditions: Fast
- Surface: Dirt

The 2014 Black-Eyed Susan Stakes was the 90th running of the Black-Eyed Susan Stakes. The race took place on May 16, 2014, and was televised in the United States on the NBC Sports Network. Ridden by jockey Javier Castellano, Stopchargingmaria won the race by a scant neck over runner-up Vero Amore. Approximate post time on the Friday evening before the Preakness Stakes was 4:49 p.m. Eastern Time. The Maryland Jockey Club raised the purse to $500,000 for the 90th running. This made The Black-Eyed-Susan Stakes the third highest payout for a race restricted to three-year-old fillies. The race was run over a fast track in a final time of 1:51.79. The Maryland Jockey Club reported total attendance of 34,756. The attendance at Pimlico Race Course that day was the second best crowd ever for Black-Eyed Susan Stakes Day behind only 2013.

== Payout ==
The 90th Black-Eyed Susan Stakes Payout Schedule

Program Number	Horse Name	Win	Place	Show
4	Stopchargingmaria	$9.60	$5.60	$4.00
10	Vero Amore	-	$12.80	$9.40
9	Fortune Pearl	-	-	$5.80

$2 Exacta: (4–10) paid $119.80

$2 Trifecta: (4–10–9) paid $871.40

$1 Superfecta: (4–10–9–1) paid $9,164.80

== The full chart ==
Finish Position	Lengths Behind	Post Position	Horse name	Trainer	Jockey	Owner	Post Time Odds	Purse Earnings
1st	0	4	Stopchargingmaria	Todd A. Pletcher	Javier Castellano	Mike Repole	3.80-1	$300,000
2nd	neck	10	Vero Amore	Robert E. Reid, Jr.	F. Pennington	Swilcan Stables	15.30-1	$100,000
3rd	3	9	Fortune Pearl	H. Graham Motion	T. McCarthy	Zanim R. Meahjohn	8.40-1	$50,000
4th	43/4</spa	1	Joint Return	John Service	K. Carmouche	Main Line Racing Stable	17.40-1	$30,000
5th	51/4	2	America	William I. Mott	John R. Velazquez	Bobby Flay	4.90-1	$15,000
6th	53/4	6	Arethusa	Eoin Harty	Rosie Napravnik	Godolphin Racing	8.00-1	$5,000
7th	6	7	La Mejor Fiesta	Wesley Ward	Victor Espinoza	Ice Wine Stable	38.40-1	
8th	81/2	3	Shanon Nicole	Michael Maker	Mike E. Smith	Connie Apostelos	11.20-1	
9th	93/4	1	Sloane Square	Todd A. Pletcher	Joel Rosario	Michael B. Tabor	3.10-1 favorite	
10th	131/4	5	Euphrosyne	Steve Asmussen	Ricardo Santana	Gillian Campbell	7.30-1	
11th	161/2	11	Image of Anna	Richard Violette	Luis Saez	The Elkstone Group	21.10-1	

- Winning Breeder: Harvey Clarke & Brookdale Farm; (KY)
- Final Time: 1:51.79
- Track Condition: Good
- Total Attendance: 34,756

== See also ==
- 2014 Preakness Stakes
- Black-Eyed Susan Stakes Stakes "top three finishers" and # of starters
