= Pasteurized (horse) =

American-bred Thoroughbred racehorse

- Sire: Milkman
- Grandsire: Cudgel
- Dam: Peake
- Damsire: Sir Gallahad III
- Sex: Stallion
- Foaled: 1935
- Country: United States
- Color: Chestnut
- Breeder: Carol Harriman Stewart
- Owner: Carol Harriman Stewart
- Trainer: George M. Odom
- Record: 22: 7-7-2
- Earnings: US$47,220

Major wins
- East View Stakes (1937); Commando Handicap (1938) American Classic Race wins: Belmont Stakes (1938)

Pasteurized (foaled 1935 in Virginia) was an American Thoroughbred racehorse best known for winning the 1938 Belmont Stakes.

== Background ==
Pasteurized was bred and raced by Carol Averell Harriman Smith (Mrs. W. Plunkett) Stewart, daughter of E. H. Harriman, a prominent New York railroad executive. He was trained by former jockey and future U.S. Racing Hall of Fame inductee, George Odom.

== Racing career ==
At age two Pasteurized's most important win came in the East View Stakes at Empire City Race Track in Yonkers, New York.

Going into his three-year-old campaign the colt wintered in Florida where he was a disappointment; his best result in the run-up to the 1938 Kentucky Derby, a third in the Flamingo Stakes. Bypassing both the Derby and the Preakness Stakes, Pasteurized earned an impressive win on May 21 in the Commando Handicap at Belmont Park and then followed up with a victory in the one and one-half mile Belmont Stakes over Preakness Stakes winner Dauber by a neck with third-place finisher Cravat another neck back. Pasteurized came out of the race with an injury and did not race again that year.

Wintered in Florida again, in early February 1939 Pasteurized made his first start since winning the Belmont a successful one at Hialeah Park Race Track, capturing a prep race for the Widener Challenge Cup Handicap. However, in the March 4th Widener Challenge, he was never a contender and finished off the board as was the case in the ensuing Santa Anita Handicap in California. Sent to Jamaica Racetrack in New York, in the April 25th Neptune Handicap at Jamaica Racetrack, Pasteurized ran only a few strides before bolting to the outside rail and never finished the race.

== Stud record ==
Pasteurized raced in early 1941 without winning and was retired to stud where he met with only modest success. Two of his progeny, Bordeaux in steeplechase racing and Woodchuck in flat racing, were multiple handicap winners.

== Sire line tree ==
- Pasteurized
  - Bordeaux
  - Marchized
  - Woodchuck
    - Winning Shot
