= Stephen L. DiMauro =

American Thoroughbred racehorse trainer

Stephen L. Dimauro
Personal information
- Born: September 3, 1957 (age 68) Philadelphia, Pennsylvania, USA
- Occupation: Trainer

Horse racing career
- Sport: Horse racing
- Career wins: 1084

Major racing wins
- Hollie Hughes Handicap (1982); Kings Point Handicap (1982); Modesty Handicap (1983); Fifth Avenue Stakes (1985); Garden State Stakes (1987); Lincoln Heritage Handicap (1987); Niagara Handicap (1987); Maryland Million Classic (1988); Delaware Handicap (1988, 1989); Grey Stakes (1990); Vagrancy Handicap (1990); Laurel Futurity Stakes (1991); Pilgrim Stakes (1991); Lamplighter Handicap (1992); New York Breeders' Futurity (1992); Demoiselle Stakes (2000); Hialeah Turf Cup Handicap (2000); Tempted Stakes (2000); Black-Eyed Susan Stakes (2001); Comely Stakes (2001); Birdonthewire Stakes (2006); Sambacarioca Stakes (2006); Affirmed Stakes (2006); Dr. Fager Stakes (2006); Shocker T. Handicap (2006); Charles Hesse Handicap (2009, 2011); Leave Me Alone Stakes (2011)

Significant horses
- Southjet, Two Item Limit, Hermosillo, Nastique

Stephen L. DiMauro (born September 3, 1957, in Philadelphia, Pennsylvania) is a retired American Thoroughbred racehorse trainer.

The son of Eclipse Award winning trainer Stephen A. DiMauro, he grew up in the business, helping his father by walking hots plus grooming and galloping the stable's horses. Young Stephen studied at St. John's University for three years before returning to racing. In 1982 he took out his trainer's license while continuing to work with his father through 1990.

Stephen DiMauro was based in New York and New Jersey until 1994 when he moved his stable to Calder Racecourse in Miami Gardens, Florida. He got his 1,000 career win on November 23, 2013, at Gulfstream Park. He retired after the 2016 racing season.
