= Sweet Vendetta =

American-bred Thoroughbred racehorse

- Sire: Stephen Got Even
- Grandsire: A.P. Indy
- Dam: Sand Pirate
- Damsire: Desert Wine
- Sex: Mare
- Foaled: 2005
- Country: United States
- Colour: Bay
- Breeder: David Cassidy & Edward Lipton
- Owner: David Cassidy
- Trainer: Gary Contrssa
- Record: 8: 4-1-0
- Earnings: $224,596

Major wins
- Black-Eyed Susan Stakes (2008); Andover Way Stakes (2008)
- Last updated on May 28, 2011

Sweet Vendetta (foaled in April 2005 in New York) is an American Thoroughbred racehorse. She won four of her first seven outings. The daughter of Stephen Got Even will best be remembered for posting a 1-1/2 length score in the mile and an eighth Grade II $200,000 Black-Eyed Susan Stakes at Pimlico Race Course on May 16, 2008.

== Racing career ==
Trained by Gary Contessa, she won a score in her second start as a two-year-old in a one-mile maiden special weight race in October 2007 at Belmont Park. Sweet Vendetta then lost her next start to Little Belle who won by two lengths in the $81,600 Busher Stakes for 3-year-old fillies at Aqueduct Racetrack on Sunday, February 24, 2008. Little Belle was timed at 1:44.3 for one and 1/16 mile race on a fast track. Little Belle paid $9.30 to win while Sweet Vendetta returned $8.60 to place. Sweet Vendetta then went on three weeks later to beat Love You Not by four lengths on March 18, 2008, in the $67,500 Andover Way Stakes for 3-year-old fillies in the rain and slop at Aqueduct Racetrack. Jockey Channing Hill was aboard as Sweet Vendetta got her second win in six starts. She ran a mile and seventy yards in 1:42, paying $7.70 to win.

Her connections including pop star owner David Cassidy decided to enter her in the second jewel of America's de facto Filly Triple Crown, the $200,000 Grade II Black-eyed Susan Stakes.

The Black-Eyed Susan Stakes is the distaff counterpart to the Preakness Stakes, and was run on the Friday of Preakness Stakes weekend before a crowd of 28,407 who withstood constant wet weather with intermittent rain. A field of eight three-year-old fillies went to the gate in this one and one eighth mile feature race. Kentucky Oaks fourth-place finisher Bsharpsonata was sent off as the 5-2 favorite over 3-1 second choice Seattle Smooth, winner of the Bay Meadows Oaks last time out. Six to one shot Sherine was allowed an uncontested lead of three lengths through fractions of 23.6, 47.6 with entrymate Pious Ashley in second as the field passed the stands for the first time and worked around the club house turn.

Entering the lane at the top of the stretch, the leaders' strategy both failed as both faded from contention. Shes All Eltish, who settled in fifth early went out wide the whole way around the final turn, then she took over the lead at the 3/16 pole and quickly opened up a three length advantage on 8-1 Sweet Vendetta. Sweet Vendetta had raced back in 6th and 7th down the backstretch but when Jockey Channing Hill asked her for a big run he got it, as she powered by Shes All Eltish at the sixteenth pole and drew off to a 1-1/2 length win in 1:49.6 over the muddy, sealed main track. It was just another length back to late-running Seattle Smooth who finished in third, while favorite Bsharpsonata raced within four lengths of the pace for the first half mile then tired badly late to finish last beaten 23 lengths.

Sweet Vendetta only raced one more time and finished off the board before she was retired in 2008.

== Pedigree ==
Pedigree of Sweet Vendetta
Sire Stephen Got Even bay 1996	A. P. Indy dk br 1989	Seattle Slew	Bold Reasoning
Sire Stephen Got Even bay 1996	A. P. Indy dk br 1989	Seattle Slew	My Charmer
Sire Stephen Got Even bay 1996	A. P. Indy dk br 1989	Weekend Surprise	Secretariat
Sire Stephen Got Even bay 1996	A. P. Indy dk br 1989	Weekend Surprise	Lassie Dear
Sire Stephen Got Even bay 1996	Immerse bay 1988	Cox's Ridge	Best Turn
Sire Stephen Got Even bay 1996	Immerse bay 1988	Cox's Ridge	Our Martha
Sire Stephen Got Even bay 1996	Immerse bay 1988	Baroness Direct	Blushing Groom
Sire Stephen Got Even bay 1996	Immerse bay 1988	Baroness Direct	Avum
Dam Sand Pirate dk br 1993	Desert Wine bay 1980	Damascus	Sword Dancer
Dam Sand Pirate dk br 1993	Desert Wine bay 1980	Damascus	Kerala
Dam Sand Pirate dk br 1993	Desert Wine bay 1980	Anne Campbell	Never Bend
Dam Sand Pirate dk br 1993	Desert Wine bay 1980	Anne Campbell	Repercussion
Dam Sand Pirate dk br 1993	Wayward Pirate dk br 1982	Pirate's Bounty	Hoist the Flag
Dam Sand Pirate dk br 1993	Wayward Pirate dk br 1982	Pirate's Bounty	Bad Seed
Dam Sand Pirate dk br 1993	Wayward Pirate dk br 1982	Wayfaring	Buffalo Lark
Dam Sand Pirate dk br 1993	Wayward Pirate dk br 1982	Wayfaring	Travel
