= Go Maggie Go =

American-bred Thoroughbred racehorse

- Sire: Ghostzapper
- Grandsire: Awesome Again
- Dam: Magibel
- Damsire: Tale of the Cat
- Sex: Mare
- Foaled: 2013
- Country: United States
- Colour: Bay
- Breeder: Michael Tarp
- Owner: Michael Tarp
- Trainer: Dale Romans
- Record: 8: 3-0-0
- Earnings: $428,400

Major wins
- Black-Eyed Susan Stakes (2016); Gulfstream Park Oaks (2016)
- Last updated on June 12, 2016

Go Maggie Go (foaled April 24, 2013, in Kentucky) is an American Thoroughbred racehorse. The daughter of Ghostzapper won the mile and an eighth Grade II $300,000 Black-Eyed Susan Stakes at Pimlico Race Course on May 20, 2016.

== Three-year-old season ==
In her three-year-old debut, Go Maggie Go's connections shipped her down to Florida for the winter. On March 13, 2016, at Gulfstream Park, that day she finished first in a $60,000 Maiden Special Weight six furlong race. Next up for Maggie was a big step up in class at Gulfstream Park in the $250,000 Grade II Gulfstream Park Oaks. In that race as the 4-1 third choice she won and beat the likes of Paola Queen who finished second and the 4-5 favorite Off the Tracks in the field of seven. That win earned her an automatic berth into both the Kentucky Oaks and the Black-Eyed Susan Stakes. In only the third start of her career Go Maggie Go finished fourth in the Kentucky Oaks behind winner Cathryn Sophia earning a check for $100,000.00.

Later that month in May 2016, trainer Dale Romans and owner Michael Tarp decided to ship the filly to Pimlico Race Course in Baltimore, Maryland, to run in the May 20 second jewel of the de facto Filly Triple Crown, the $300,000 Grade 2 Black-Eyed Susan Stakes. A capacity of fourteen three year-old fillies were entered, and Go Maggie Go was listed as a 2-1 second favorite behind only Land of Sea at 3-2. In the 1 1/8 miles race on dirt, she broke sharply and assumed the lead early as the field passed the stands for the first time. Fractions were moderate times of :23.49 for the first quarter and :48.83 for the half mile.

Go Maggie Go rounded Pimlico's famous clubhouse turn in second two lengths behind 51-1 longshot Ma Can Do It. Those two hooked up in a frantic duel at the top of the lane. In the final eighth of mile under hand urging by jockey Luis Saez she drifted out in the stretch. Go Maggie Go won by thinning head over Ma Can Do It. Her final time was a fast 1:51.81. It was just another neck back to Kinsley Kisses who took third by a nose over Dothraki Queen as the top four finished in blanket finishes. The winner's share of the purse was $180,000.

== Pedigree ==
Pedigree of Go Maggie Go, bay filly, foaled April 24, 2013
Sire Ghostzapper b. 2000	Awesome Again b. 1994	Deputy Minister dkb/br. 1979	Vice Regent
Sire Ghostzapper b. 2000	Awesome Again b. 1994	Deputy Minister dkb/br. 1979	Mint Copy
Sire Ghostzapper b. 2000	Awesome Again b. 1994	Primal Force b. 1987	Blushing Groom
Sire Ghostzapper b. 2000	Awesome Again b. 1994	Primal Force b. 1987	Prime Prospect
Sire Ghostzapper b. 2000	Baby Zip b. 1991	Relaunch gr. 1976	In Reality
Sire Ghostzapper b. 2000	Baby Zip b. 1991	Relaunch gr. 1976	Foggy Note
Sire Ghostzapper b. 2000	Baby Zip b. 1991	Thirty Zip dkb/br. 1983	Tri Jet
Sire Ghostzapper b. 2000	Baby Zip b. 1991	Thirty Zip dkb/br. 1983	Sailaway
Dam Magibel b. 2000	Tale of the Cat dkb/br. 1994	Storm Cat dkb/br. 1983	Storm Bird
Dam Magibel b. 2000	Tale of the Cat dkb/br. 1994	Storm Cat dkb/br. 1983	Terlingua
Dam Magibel b. 2000	Tale of the Cat dkb/br. 1994	Yarn dkb/br. 1987	Mr. Prospector
Dam Magibel b. 2000	Tale of the Cat dkb/br. 1994	Yarn dkb/br. 1987	Narrate
Dam Magibel b. 2000	Marquetry Road ch. 1995	Marquetry ch. 1987	Conquistador Cielo
Dam Magibel b. 2000	Marquetry Road ch. 1995	Marquetry ch. 1987	Regent's Walk
Dam Magibel b. 2000	Marquetry Road ch. 1995	Road to Heaven ch. 1978	Kennedy Road
Dam Magibel b. 2000	Marquetry Road ch. 1995	Road to Heaven ch. 1978	Sweet Heaven
