= Acting Happy =

American-bred Thoroughbred racehorse

- Sire: Empire Maker
- Grandsire: Unbridled
- Dam: I Ain't Bluffin
- Damsire: Pine Bluff
- Sex: Mare
- Foaled: 2007
- Country: United States
- Colour: Bay
- Breeder: Samantha & Mace Siegel
- Owner: Jay Em Ess Stable
- Trainer: Richard E. Dutrow, Jr.
- Record: 9: 2-3-2
- Earnings: $230,500

Major wins
- Black-Eyed Susan Stakes (2010)
- Last updated on May 21, 2011

Acting Happy (foaled in March 2007 in Kentucky) is an American Thoroughbred racehorse. The daughter of Empire Maker is best known for posting a 1-1/2 length win in the mile and an eighth Grade II $200,000 Black-Eyed Susan Stakes at Pimlico Race Course in May 2010.

== Three-year-old season ==
Acting Happy did not race as a two-year-old but won her debut race on January 24, 2010, at Gulfstream Park in a nine-furlong maiden special weight race. Trained by Richard E. Dutrow, Jr., she then finished second in a pair of allowance races at Gulfstream Park. Her connections next entered her in her stakes debut in the second jewel of America's de facto Filly Triple Crown, the Black-eyed Susan Stakes.

Acting Happy put away favored Tidal Pool in upper stretch and then held off a late run from No Such Word to pull off an 11-1 upset in the $200,000 grade two Black-Eyed Susan Stakes for 3-year-old fillies on May 14, 2010, at Pimlico Race Course. She received a pace-pressing trip under jockey Jose Lezcano while following longshot Khancord Kid through opening splits of :23.7 and :47.5. Tidal Pool, the third-place finisher in the grade one Kentucky Oaks, was also tracking the leader. Meanwhile, Khancord Kid, Tidal Pool, and Acting Happy were heads apart coming off the final turn. After Acting Happy wore down a stubborn Tidal Pool approaching the sixteenth-pole, she had enough to hold off a late charge from No Such Word, hitting the wire 1-1/2 lengths in front. The final time was 1:50 flat over a fast track. No Such Word and jockey Terry Thompson were 2-1/4 lengths clear of third-place Tidal Pool.

Later that year, Acting Happy finished in the money in two grade one races by showing in the Coaching Club American Oaks at nine furlongs and the Alabama Stakes at ten furlongs both at Saratoga Race Course.

== Later racing career ==
Acting Happy began her four-year-old season at Gulfstream Park in Hallandale, Florida, starting in a stakes on February 16, 2011. She finished second but was injured, and her connections gave her time off to recuperate. Her rehabilitation lasted almost a year. Fifty-one weeks later, she started as a five-year-old at Laurel Park Racecourse in the Maryland Racing Media Stakes on February 11, 2012. She broke well and stalked the pace in second around most of the track. At the eighth pole, she veered in slightly and was bumped hard by the leader, Pilot Point Lady. Both mares faded after the interference to finish off the board. Acting Happy finished fourth, earning $4,500 of the $100,000 purse. She had won two races, placed second three times and showed third twice, banking career earnings of $230,500.

== Pedigree ==
Pedigree of Acting Happy
Sire Empire Maker dk br 2000	Unbridled bay 1987	Fappiano	Mr. Prospector
Sire Empire Maker dk br 2000	Unbridled bay 1987	Fappiano	Killaloe
Sire Empire Maker dk br 2000	Unbridled bay 1987	Gana Facil	Le Fabuleux
Sire Empire Maker dk br 2000	Unbridled bay 1987	Gana Facil	Charedi
Sire Empire Maker dk br 2000	Toussaud dk br 1989	El Gran Senor	Northern Dancer
Sire Empire Maker dk br 2000	Toussaud dk br 1989	El Gran Senor	Sex Appeal
Sire Empire Maker dk br 2000	Toussaud dk br 1989	Image of Reality	In Reality
Sire Empire Maker dk br 2000	Toussaud dk br 1989	Image of Reality	Edee's Image
Dam I Ain't Bluffing bay 1994	Pine Bluff bay 1989	Danzig	Northern Dancer
Dam I Ain't Bluffing bay 1994	Pine Bluff bay 1989	Danzig	Pas de Nom
Dam I Ain't Bluffing bay 1994	Pine Bluff bay 1989	Rowdy Angel	Halo
Dam I Ain't Bluffing bay 1994	Pine Bluff bay 1989	Rowdy Angel	Ramhyde
Dam I Ain't Bluffing bay 1994	Cup of Honey bay 1976	Raise A Cup	Raise A Native
Dam I Ain't Bluffing bay 1994	Cup of Honey bay 1976	Raise A Cup	Spring Sunshine
Dam I Ain't Bluffing bay 1994	Cup of Honey bay 1976	Honey Deb	Herbager
Dam I Ain't Bluffing bay 1994	Cup of Honey bay 1976	Honey Deb	Smart Deb
