= Keen Pauline =

American-bred Thoroughbred racehorse

- Sire: Pulpit
- Grandsire: A. P. Indy
- Dam: Grand Pauline
- Damsire: Preach
- Sex: Mare
- Foaled: 2012
- Country: United States
- Colour: Chestnut
- Breeder: Stonestreet Stables
- Owner: Stonestreet Stables
- Trainer: Dale Romans
- Record: 6: 2-2-1
- Earnings: $181,932

Major wins
- Black-Eyed Susan Stakes (2015)
- Last updated on May 20, 2015

Keen Pauline (foaled April 27, 2012, in Kentucky) is an American Thoroughbred racehorse. The daughter of Pulpit won the mile and an eighth Grade II $250,000 Black-Eyed Susan Stakes at Pimlico Race Course on May 15, 2015.

== Two-year-old season ==
Keen Pauline made her first start in $40,000 maiden special weight race at Saratoga Race Course on August 25, 2014, and finished last in a field of ten as the race was won by Eclipse Award finalist Lady Eli. In the second race of her career, Keen Pauline scored her first win in a dead-heat with heavily favored Streetheart over a field of eleven in a $37,000 Maiden Special Weight Race at Churchill Downs on September 27, 2014. Six weeks later, she finished second in a $43,000 allowance race at Churchill Downs on November 9, 2014. She finished her freshman year with $23,732 in earnings and a win and a placing out of three starts.

== Three-year-old season ==
In her three-year-old debut, Keen Pauline's connections shipped her down to Florida for the winter. On January 16, 2015, at Gulfstream Park, she finished third to Eskenformoney in a $48,000 allowance race. She was then freshened for the winter and did not race again for 90 days. On April 16, 2015, Keen Pauline finished fourth in a $60,000 allowance race at Keeneland Race Course.

In May 2015, trainer Dale Romans and owner Barbara Banke decided to ship the filly to Pimlico Race Course in Baltimore, Maryland, to run in the May 15 second jewel of the de facto Filly Triple Crown, the $300,000 Grade 2 Black-Eyed Susan Stakes. Eight three year-old fillies were entered, and Keen Pauline was listed as a 15-1 longshot behind four graded-stakes-. placed rivals. In the 1 1/8 miles race on dirt, she broke sharply and assumed the lead early as the field passed the stands for the first time. Fractions were moderate to slow times of :24.37 for the first quarter and :49.09 for the half mile.

Keen Pauline saved ground by ducking in close to the rail, and as she rounded Pimlico's famous clubhouse turn she was on the lead a half length ahead of Gypsy Judy and Devine Aida. Those two tired to finish last and next to last. Going down the backstretch, Keen Pauline picked up the pace and completed the first 3/4 mile in a swift 1:13.00 flat.[3] Under hand urging by jockey Javier Castellano at the top of the lane, she pulled away from the field and won by two and three-quarter lengths over Include Betty.[3] Her final time was a fast 1:50.46. It was another half length back to Ahh Chocolate in third, and Danessa Deluxe finished another one quarter length behind her in fourth. The winner's share of the purse was $180,000.

== Pedigree ==
Pedigree of Keen Pauline
Sire Pulpit dk br 1994	A. P. Indy dk br 1989	Seattle Slew	Bold Reasoning
Sire Pulpit dk br 1994	A. P. Indy dk br 1989	Seattle Slew	My Charmer
Sire Pulpit dk br 1994	A. P. Indy dk br 1989	Weekend Surprise	Secretariat
Sire Pulpit dk br 1994	A. P. Indy dk br 1989	Weekend Surprise	Lassie Dear
Sire Pulpit dk br 1994	Preach bay 1989	Mr Prospector	Raise a Native
Sire Pulpit dk br 1994	Preach bay 1989	Mr Prospector	Gold Digger
Sire Pulpit dk br 1994	Preach bay 1989	Narrate	Honest Pleasure
Sire Pulpit dk br 1994	Preach bay 1989	Narrate	State
Dam Grand Pauline ch. 2005	Two Punch gray 1983	Mr Prospector	Raise a Native
Dam Grand Pauline ch. 2005	Two Punch gray 1983	Mr Prospector	Gold Digger
Dam Grand Pauline ch. 2005	Two Punch gray 1983	Heavenly Cause	Grey Dawn
Dam Grand Pauline ch. 2005	Two Punch gray 1983	Heavenly Cause	Lady Dulcinea
Dam Grand Pauline ch. 2005	Grand Sophisticate dk br 1989	El Gran Senor	Northern Dancer
Dam Grand Pauline ch. 2005	Grand Sophisticate dk br 1989	El Gran Senor	Sex Appeal
Dam Grand Pauline ch. 2005	Grand Sophisticate dk br 1989	Sophisticated Girl	Stop the Music
Dam Grand Pauline ch. 2005	Grand Sophisticate dk br 1989	Sophisticated Girl	Close Control (Family A-29)
