= Gary C. Contessa =

American horse trainer

Gary Contessa
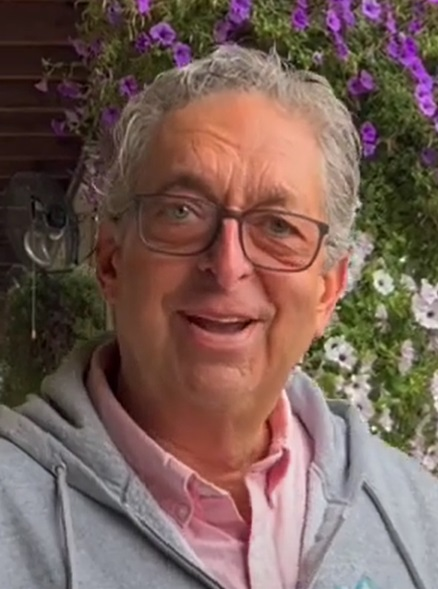
- Contessa in 2023

Personal information
- Born: October 13, 1957 (age 68) Merrick, New York, United States
- Occupation: Trainer

Horse racing career
- Sport: Horse racing
- Career wins: 2,331 (ongoing)

Major racing wins
- Valley Forge Handicap (1987); Ashland Stakes (1991); Black-Eyed Susan Stakes (1996, 2008); East View Stakes (1998, 2004, 2006); Damon Runyon Stakes (1997, 2002, 2015); Miss Grillo Stakes (1999); Ashley T. Cole Handicap (2001); Bed O' Roses Handicap (2006, 2008); Gallant Fox Handicap (2006); Victoria Park Stakes (2006); Fort Marcy Handicap (2007); Saranac Stakes (2007); Dearly Precious Stakes (2008); Discovery Handicap (2008); Hudson Stakes (NYB) (2008); Maryland Sprint Handicap (2008); Spinaway Stakes (2018)

Racing awards
- NYRA Trainer of the Year (2006, 2007)

Significant horses
- Peace Rules, Sweet Vendetta

Gary C. Contessa (born October 13, 1957) is an American horse trainer in the sport of Thoroughbred horse racing. He became a professional trainer in 1984.

From 2006 through 2008, Gary Contessa led all New York Racing Association (NYRA) trainers in wins. In 2007 he set a record with 159 NYRA wins. He was the New York Racing Association, Trainer of the Year in 2006 and 2007.
