= Tony Dutrow =

American horse trainer

Personal information
- Born: April 27, 1958 (age 68) Hagerstown, Maryland
- Occupation: Trainer

Horse racing career
- Sport: Horse racing
- Career wins: 1,999 (ongoing)

Major racing wins
- Prioress Handicap (1987, 2009); Futurity Stakes (2000); Astoria Stakes (2001); Schuylerville Stakes (2001); Valley Stream Stakes (2002); Honorable Miss Handicap (2003); General George Handicap (2007); Bay Shore Stakes (2007); Comely Stakes (2008); Cotillion Handicap (2008, 2010); Bed O' Roses Handicap (2009, 2010); Shuvee Handicap (2009); Ogden Phipps Handicap (2009); Holy Bull Stakes (2010); Jim Dandy Stakes (2010); Ballerina Stakes (2010); Top Flight Handicap (2010); Demoiselle Stakes (2010); Hollywood Derby (2017)

Significant horses
- Cat Moves, Seattle Smooth, Winslow Homer, A Little Warm, Havre de Grace, Rightly So

Anthony W. Dutrow (born April 27, 1958) is an American horse trainer in Thoroughbred horse racing.

The eldest of three brothers involved in Thoroughbred racing, he is the son of the late well-known Maryland trainer Richard E. Dutrow, Sr. A brother to trainer Rick Dutrow, the youngest brother Chip works as Tony's assistant.

Tony Dutrow grew up in the racing business and as a boy helped out at his father's barn. Having learned to condition horses, he took out his training license and earned his first win in 1975 at Delaware Park Racetrack. He worked with his father for several years then beginning in 1985 with trainer Bobby Frankel in California until going out on his own in 1987.
