= Aqueduct Racetrack =

Horseracing venue in New York City (1894–2026)

Coordinates: 40°40′20″N 73°49′47″W

Aqueduct

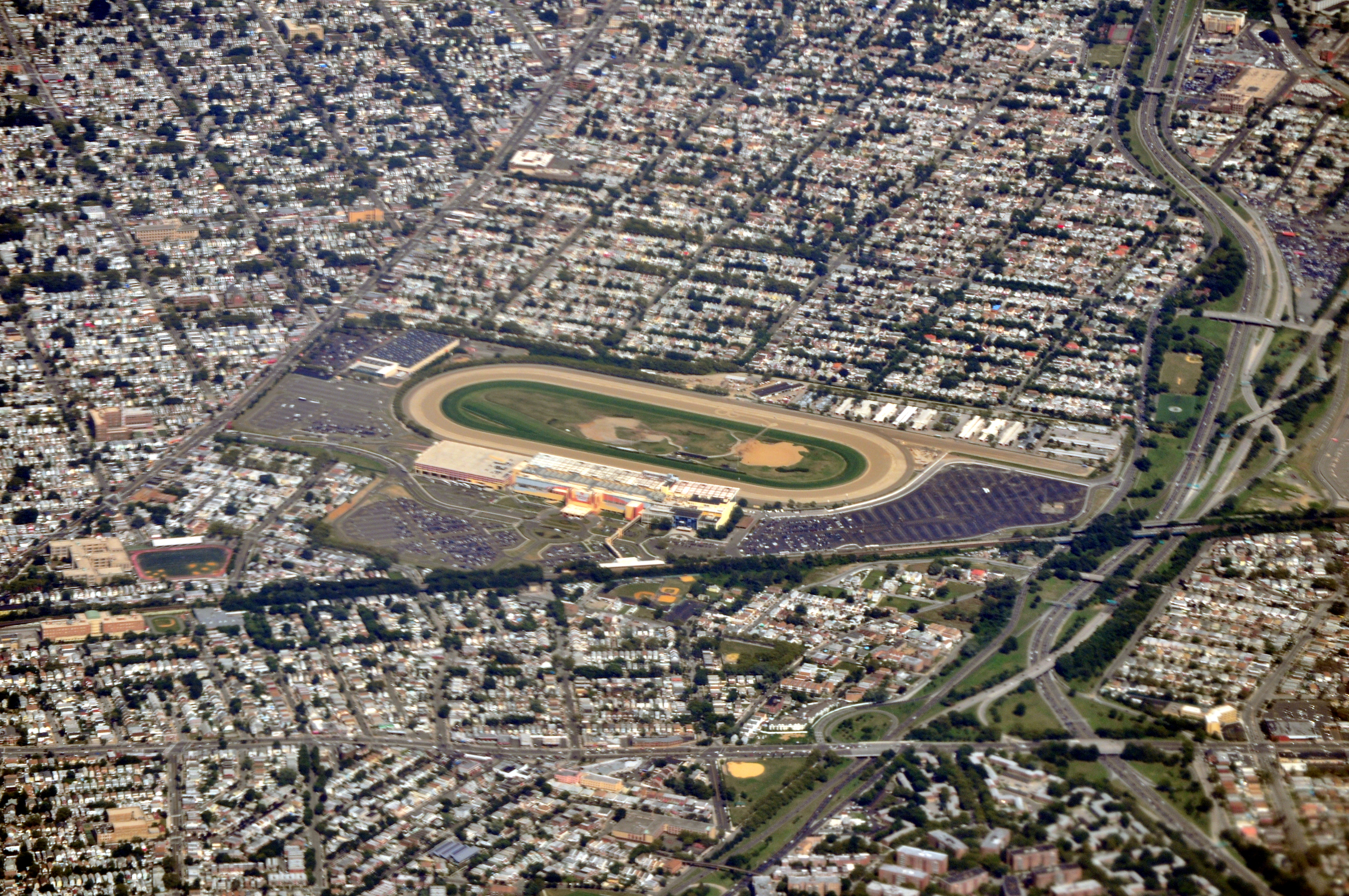
- Aerial view of Aqueduct Racetrack in 2013
- Interactive map of Aqueduct
- Location: New York City (South Ozone Park, Queens), New York; United States
- Owned by: State of New York
- Operated by: New York Racing Association
- Date opened: September 27, 1894 (132 years ago); September 14, 1959 (67 years ago) (renovation)
- Date closed: June 28, 2026 (4 months ago)
- Screened on: MSG Plus (restricted to cable systems in New York City, Long Island, Northern/Central New Jersey, Fairfield County, Connecticut, and Northeastern Pennsylvania); Capital OTB via WXXA Channel 23.2; NYRA.com/NYRA Now app (Internet); Altitude Sports (Rocky Mountains); Fox Sports 2 Fox Sports Ohio; Fox Sports West and Prime Ticket (Southern California); Fox Sports San Diego; NBC Sports Network; NBC Television
- Course type: Flat/Thoroughbred
- Notable races: Wood Memorial Stakes (G2); Cigar Mile Handicap (G2); Carter Handicap (G2); Gazelle Stakes (G3); Gotham Stakes (G3)

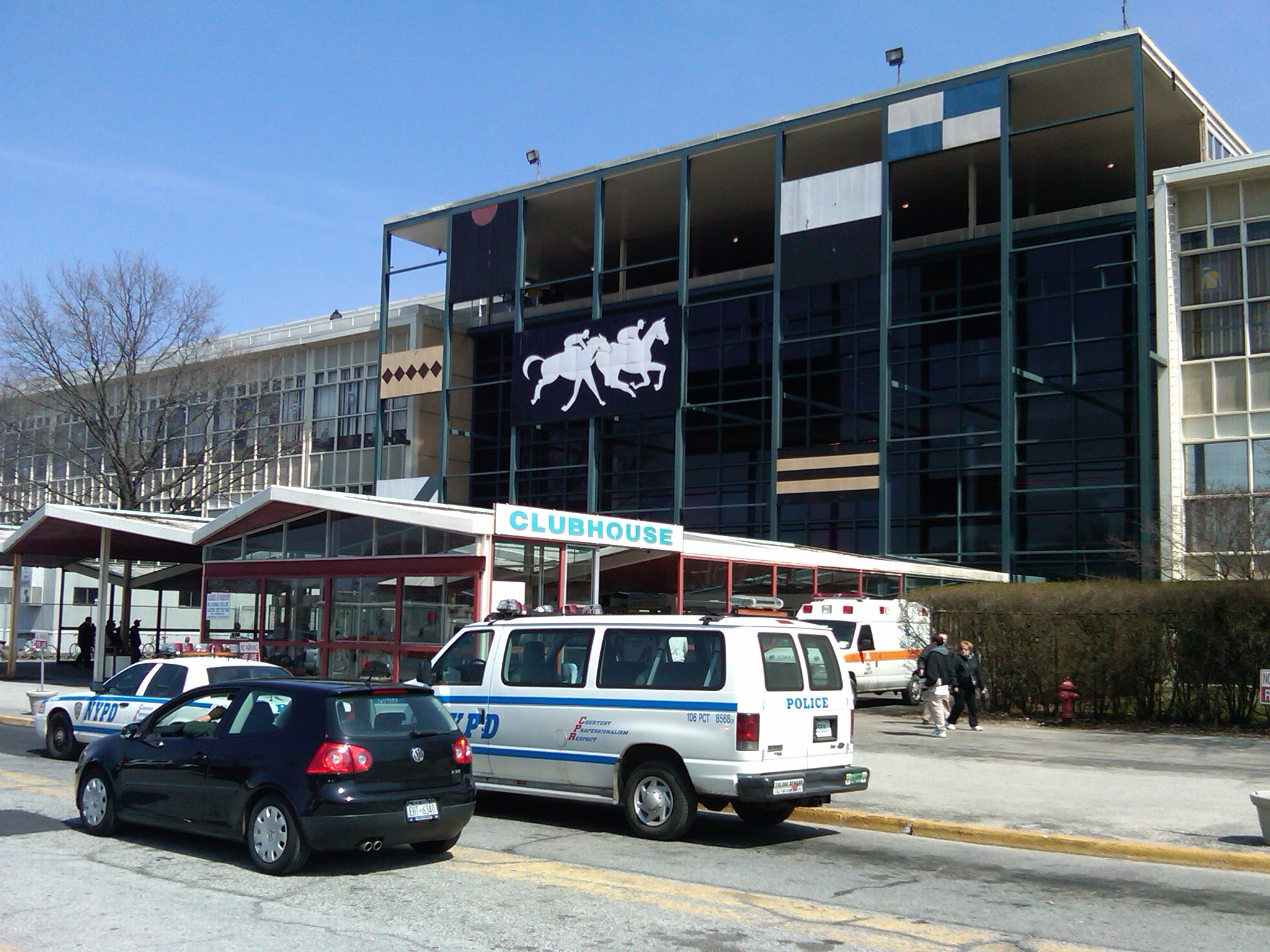
Main clubhouse entrance to Aqueduct Racetrack in April 2011

Aqueduct Racetrack was a Thoroughbred horse racing facility in the South Ozone Park and Jamaica neighborhoods of Queens, New York City, United States. Aqueduct was the last racetrack to operate within New York City limits. Its races usually ran from late October or early November through April. The final races were held at Aqueduct on June 28, 2026 and it remained open for simulcast horse betting at other tracks until September 7, 2026.

The track had three courses: the main track (dirt), with a circumference of 1 1/8 miles (1.8 km), whose infield holds the 1 mile (1.6 km) Main Turf Course and the Inner Turf Course, measuring 7.065 furlongs (1.421 km). The track had seating capacity of 17,000 and total capacity of 40,000.

The racetrack and the adjacent headquarters of the New York Racing Association (NYRA) sat on a 172-acre (70 ha) site. The New York State Franchise Oversight Board leases about 72.6 acres (29.4 ha) of the racetrack site to the Resorts World New York City casino and hotel.

== History ==
Operating near the site of a former conduit of the Brooklyn Waterworks that brought water from eastern Long Island to the Ridgewood Reservoir, Aqueduct Racetrack opened on September 27, 1894, by the Queens County Jockey Club. The track was named "Aqueduct" after the former Ridgewood Aqueduct. The facility was expanded and a new clubhouse constructed before the 1941 summer meet.

In 1955, the Greater New York Association took over Aqueduct along with Belmont Park, Saratoga Race Course, and Jamaica Race Course, deciding to make major upgrades to Aqueduct, after which Jamaica Race Course would be sold for redevelopment as a housing project. Aqueduct closed in 1956, reopening September 14, 1959, after $33 million of renovations designed by noted racetrack architect Arthur Froehlich of the firm Arthur Froehlich and Associates of Beverly Hills, California. The Equestris Restaurant in the clubhouse opened in 1981 and was the largest restaurant in New York City at the time. Additional renovations were made in 2001, 2006, and 2007.

In the years after Aqueduct was rebuilt in 1959 the track lay idle from early November until April 1; by 1971 this period had been reduced to from just before Christmas until March 1, around when off-track betting began in New York City, creating a demand for horse racing to be contested in the region year-round.

One annual meeting was held at Aqueduct, usually from the last Wednesday in October until the first Sunday in May. Races had been run on the Inner Dirt Track between the Wednesday after Thanksgiving until just before the Wood Memorial in recent years. Prior to 1977, a summer meeting also was held at Aqueduct, from mid-June to late July. The Wood Memorial was Aqueduct's marquee race, which culminates the winter meet. The Remsen and Cigar Mile were major races that began the winter meet. The prestigious Jockey Club Gold Cup was usually run there between 1958 and 1974, and what was perhaps the track's most distinctive race, the marathon 2 1/4 miles (3.6 km) Display Handicap, was last contested in 1990.

From 1963 through 1967, races normally run at Belmont Park, including the Belmont Stakes, were run at Aqueduct while Belmont's grandstand was being rebuilt. The track played host to the second ever Breeders' Cup on November 2, 1985.

Aqueduct is the site of the first (and still the only) triple dead heat for the win in a stakes race. In the 1944 running of the Carter Handicap, Brownie, Bossuet, and Wait A Bit hit the finish line at the same time. On April 8, 2006, during an eleven-race program at Aqueduct that included the Wood Memorial Stakes, a rare event happened when dead heats for each of the three "money" positions (Win, Place, and Show) occurred in three separate races: Saint Anddan and Criminal Mind dead-heated for Place in Race 5; Naragansett and Emotrin dead-heated for Show in Race 6; and Karakorum Tuxedo and Megatrend dead-heated for Win in Race 10.

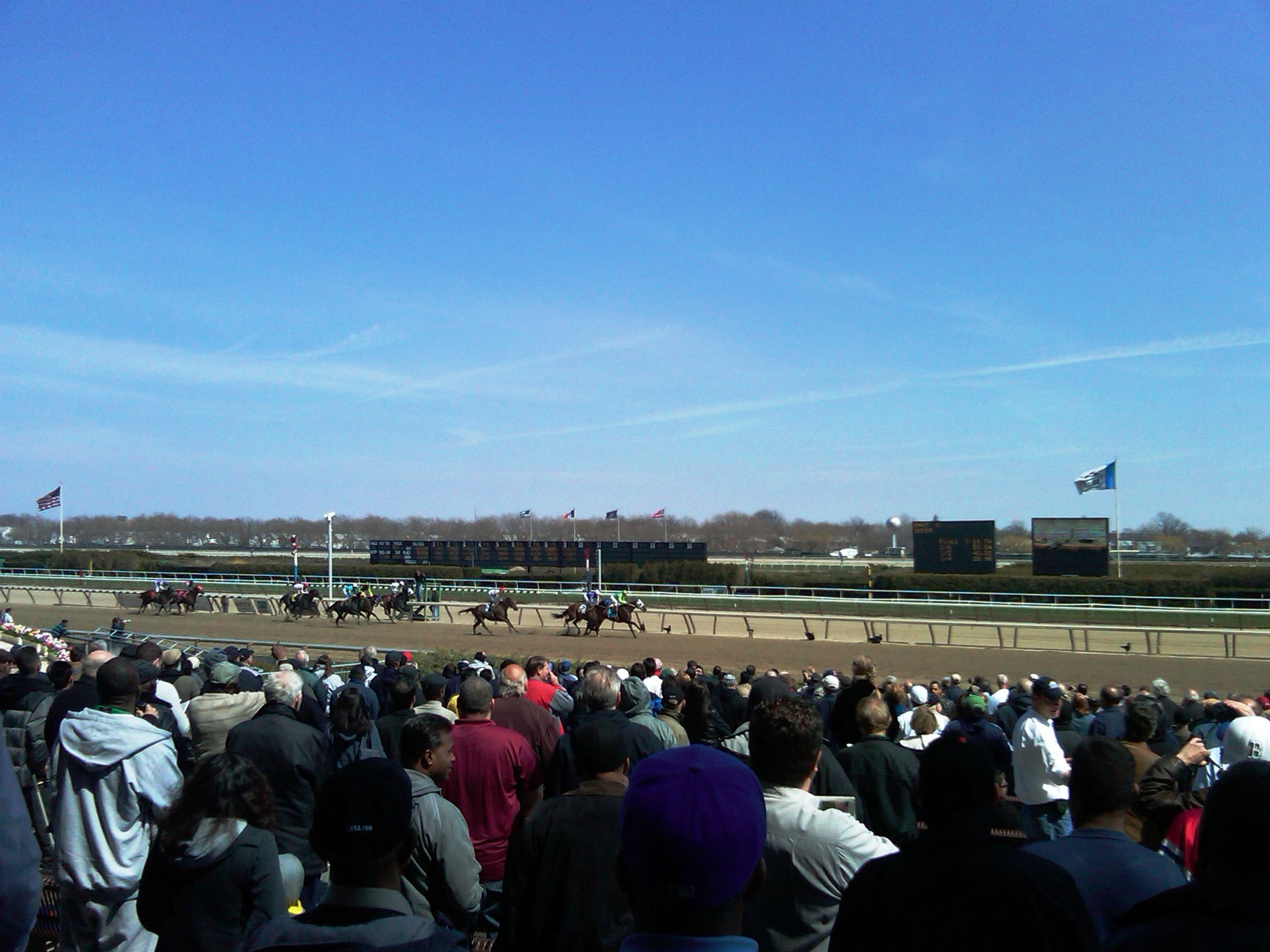
Spectators watching the finish of a race on Aqueduct's Main Track

Hall of Fame horse Cigar won the first two races in his 16-race win streak at Aqueduct. After he switched from grass to dirt, Cigar's first win was by eight lengths in an allowance race on October 28, 1994, and was followed by a seven-length win in the NYRA Mile on November 26, 1994, a Grade 1 race that was renamed in the horse's honor in 1997. On May 31, 1965, 73,375 spectators were on hand at Aqueduct and watched Gun Bow win the Metropolitan Mile. At the time, it was the largest crowd to ever attend a thoroughbred horse racing event in New York.

The Aqueduct Racetrack hosted the 1973 Brooklyn Handicap (now Stakes) on July 4, 1973. Running 1 3/16 miles on dirt, the 1973 Brooklyn Handicap was then a Grade One (G1) race (now G2) at the time. As the stablemate of Triple Crown winner Secretariat, Hall of Fame racehorse Riva Ridge of Meadow Stable set a world record of 1:52.40 when he won the Brooklyn Handicap. Secretariat was retired at Aqueduct in a ceremonial walk around the track event before the public on November 6, 1973. About 30,000 cheering fans witnessed Secretariat's ceremonial walk on the track in person with Ron Turcotte as his jockey. Riva Ridge and Secretariat both retired to the breeding program and a new life at Claiborne Farm in Kentucky.

From 1978 to 2011, the Aqueduct Flea Market was held on Saturdays, Sundays, and Tuesdays, and was located in the racetrack's north parking lot along Rockaway Boulevard. The flea market contained over 500 vendors and offered a hodgepodge of goods, including bedding, incense, pots and pans, and other items.

Pope Saint John Paul II celebrated a Mass for 75,000 congregants at Aqueduct on October 6, 1995.

After the financial collapse and closure of the New York City Off-Track Betting Corporation on December 10, 2010, Aqueduct Racetrack saw an increase in patrons for the first time in several years. On December 11, one day after NYCOTB's closure, the number of patrons who entered Aqueduct's doors increased 61% (5,444 customers) compared to the previous year (3,378 customers). The New York Racing Association, which owns Aqueduct, took advantage by offering former NYCOTB customers free bus shuttle service from select former NYCOTB branches to Aqueduct Racetrack with a free hot dog, soft drink, and Post Parade program.

Before 1976, the Inner Dirt Track was a turf course known as the Main Turf Course. In May 2017, NYRA announced that they would resurface the 1 1/8-mile (1.8 km) main track with a limestone base, and convert the inner dirt track back into a turf course. The changes were completed in time for the start of the 2017 fall meet on November 3. With this change, the main track began to be used for winter racing.

=== 2007 proposal to close track ===
In May 2007, reports indicated that then-New York Governor Eliot Spitzer was considering closing Aqueduct and selling the 192-acre (0.78 km^{2}) track and its stables, which then housed 400 horses, to developers when the New York Racing Association lease expired at the end of 2007. According to the reports, Belmont Park, which is 8 miles (13 km) east in Elmont, New York, would have become a nearly year-round track and would get the video lottery machines authorized to operate at Aqueduct. Belmont Park would have been modified to handle winter requirements, which would have included heated stands and the construction of new stables. According to the plans that were discussed, the oldest and most historic track in the state, Saratoga Race Course, would have been operated by the New York Racing Association, and a new entity would have operated Belmont Park. Aqueduct traditionally has been considered a track frequented by blue collar fans while Belmont Park has a more upscale reputation.

State Assembly Member Audrey I. Pheffer (D), whose district included Aqueduct, fought the closing of the track, which she felt was important to the local community. NYRA was planning to cease all operations after completing the racing card of February 10, 2008. This was averted when a deal was reached with NYRA and New York State. To help raise capital, NYRA sold 325,000 square feet (30,200 m^{2}) of vacant land near Aqueduct in June 2009. The land that was auctioned off consisted of residential lots to the west of the IND Rockaway Line.

=== 2012 proposal for convention center ===
On January 4, 2012, Governor Andrew Cuomo announced plans to construct a new convention center on the Aqueduct Racetrack to replace the aging Javits Center. It would have been the country's largest convention center, featuring hotels, restaurants, and expanded gambling. Building the convention center would have required additional land, which might have included nearby City-owned lots leased to the Port Authority of New York and New Jersey for airport parking or the adjacent racetrack (as racing could be consolidated to Belmont Park).

On June 1, 2012, Governor Cuomo announced that plans to build the convention center had been canceled.

=== 2026 closure ===
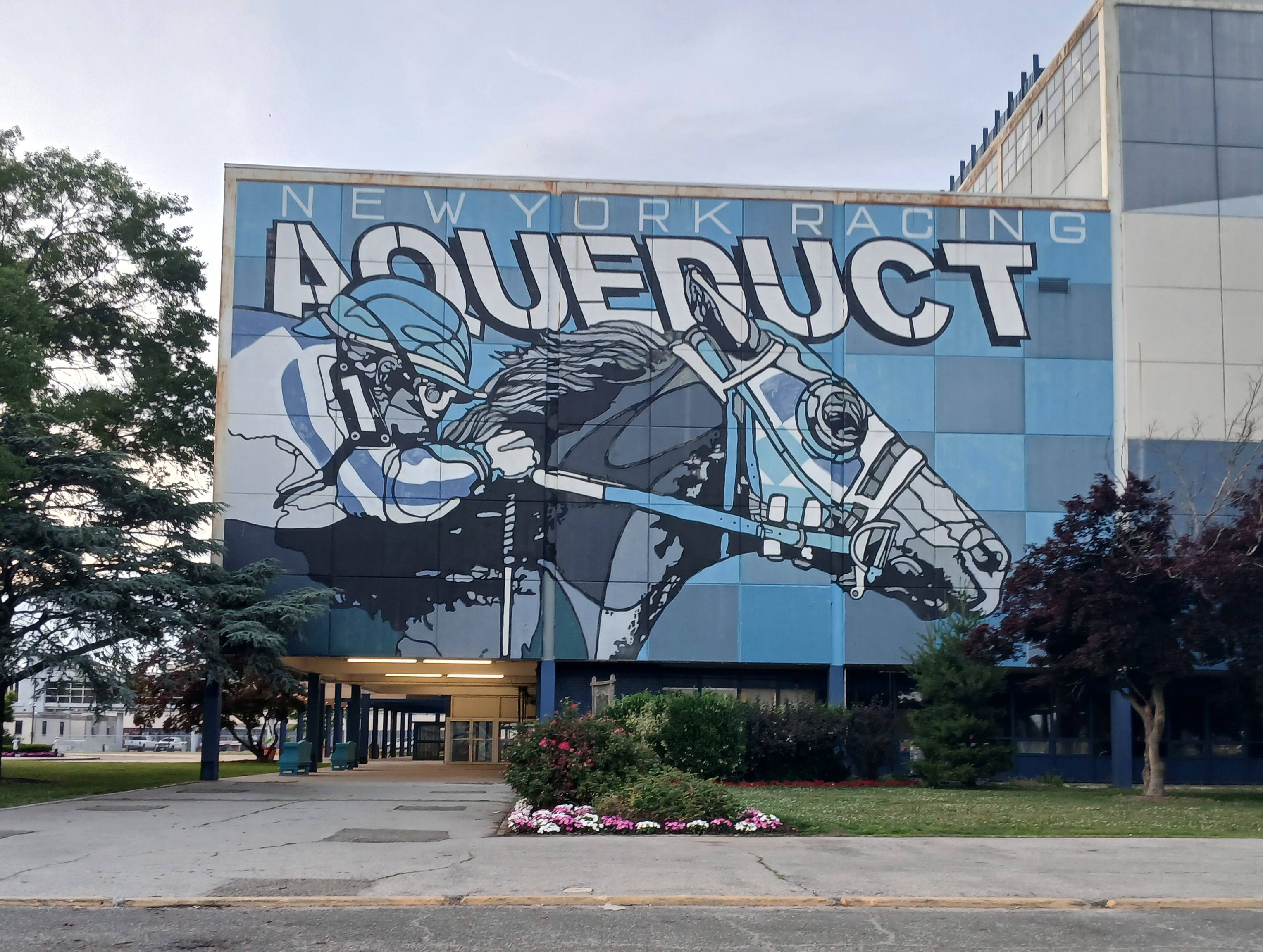
Mural on the south side of Aqueduct Racetrack in 2026.

In 2022, the NYRA announced that it would shutter Aqueduct Racetrack in coming years. That December, the NYRA formally announced its intention to upgrade the facilities at nearby Belmont Park to make it suitable to host year-round thoroughbred racing and training. Once that work is complete, the agency is to give up its lease of Aqueduct and consolidate horse racing at Belmont. The Belmont renovation was completed in 2026.

In early 2023, Governor Kathy Hochul announced that the state would provide $455 million in capital funds to redevelop 110 acres of state-owned land at the Aqueduct Racetrack site. Community engagement workshops and site planning for the redevelopment of the Aqueduct Racetrack site will begin in May 2026.

The last day of races at Aqueduct were run on June 28, 2026. The facility remained open for simulcasting and off track betting until September 7, 2026.

== Resorts World New York City ==
The Aqueduct Racetrack complex includes the Resorts World New York City casino and hotel. It was proposed in the late 2000s and opened in late 2011, the first Resorts World to be built in America. It is the first and only legal casino in New York City, and one of three in the region, with Empire City Casino and Jake's 58 Hotel & Casino in Islandia.

The casino features four automated table games—baccarat, blackjack, craps, and roulette—and a wide array of video slot machines. Baccarat is played with real playing cards, dealt inside a machine.

== Track announcers ==
Sportscaster Tom Durkin was the chief track announcer at Aqueduct and the other NYRA tracks until his retirement on August 31, 2014. Races were called by John Imbriale until 2023 and after that races were called by Chris Griffin. Durkin came out of retirement to call the second race on the closing day of Aqueduct on June 28, 2026.

== Racing ==
The following graded stakes were run at Aqueduct:

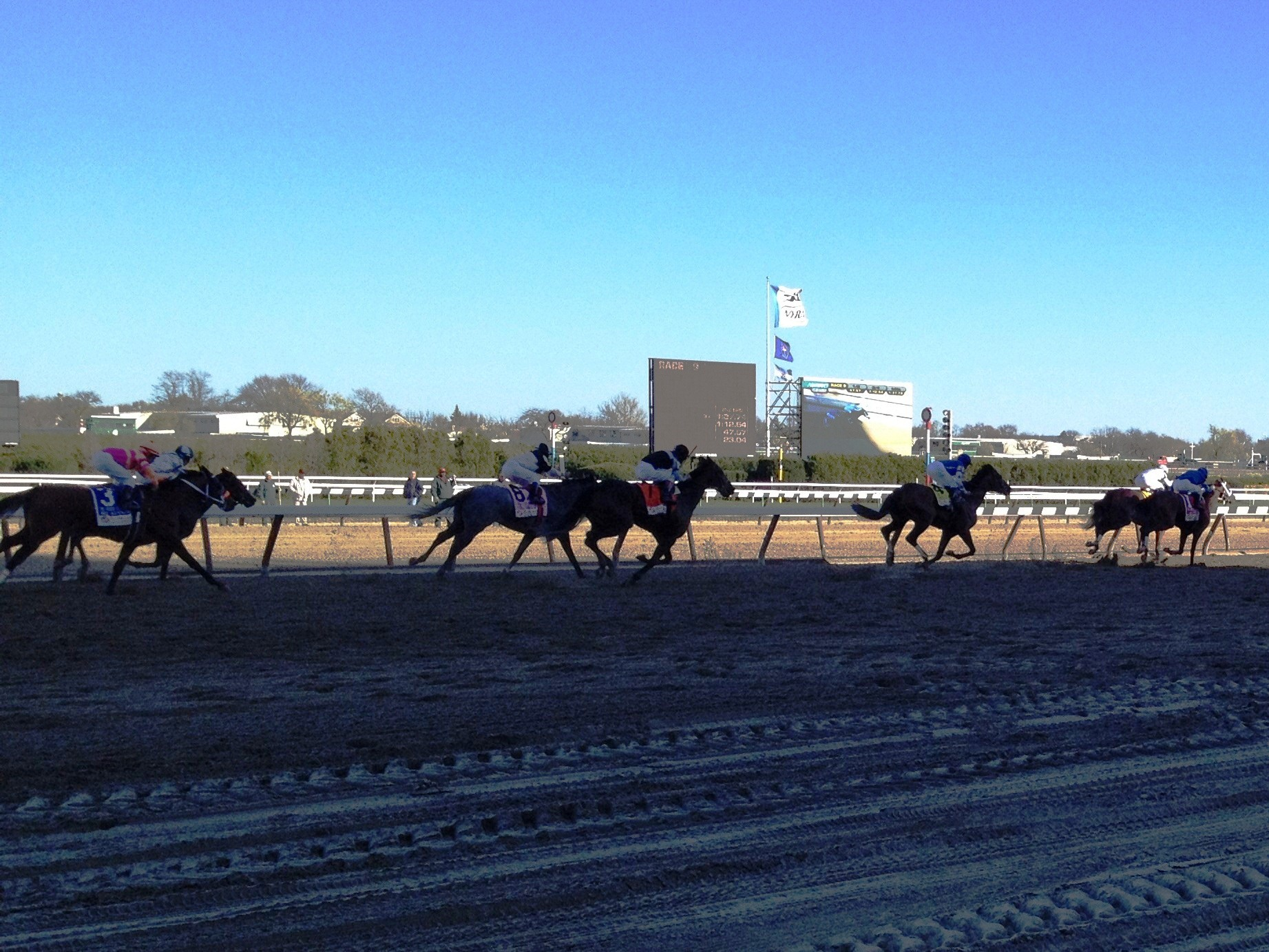
Horses approach the finish line in the 2012 Wood Memorial Stakes.

Grade II:

- Carter Handicap
- Demoiselle Stakes
- Gazelle Stakes
- Remsen Stakes
- Red Smith Handicap
- Wood Memorial Stakes
- Cigar Mile Handicap

Grade III:

- Bay Shore Stakes
- Comely Stakes
- Distaff Handicap
- Excelsior Handicap
- Glen Cove Stakes
- Gotham Stakes
- Long Island Handicap
- Nashua Stakes
- Tom Fool Handicap
- Winter Memories Stakes

Non-Graded:

- Aqueduct Handicap
- Beaugay Handicap
- Belle Harbor Stakes
- Broadway Stakes (NYB)
- Busanda Stakes
- Busher Stakes
- Cat Cay Stakes
- Cicada Stakes
- Count Fleet Stakes
- Damon Runyon Stakes
- Discovery Stakes
- East View Stakes
- Fall Highweight Handicap
- Franklin Square Stakes
- Garland of Roses Stakes
- Gravesend Handicap
- Go For Wand Handicap
- Hollie Hughes Handicap
- Interborough Handicap
- Jazil Stakes
- Jerome Stakes
- Jimmy Winkfield Stakes
- Lost in the Fog Stakes
- Maddie May Stakes
- Queens County Handicap
- Ruthless Stakes
- Stymie Handicap
- Tempted Stakes
- Toboggan Stakes
- Top Flight Handicap
- Turnback the Alarm Handicap
- Withers Stakes
- Whirlaway Stakes

Discontinued:

- Affectionately Handicap
- Fred "Cappy" Capossela Stakes
- Gallant Fox Handicap
- Next Move Handicap (Note: The race was put on hiatus and hasn’t been run since 2009.)
- Sport Page Handicap
- Stuyvesant Handicap
- Valley Stream Stakes

== Transportation ==
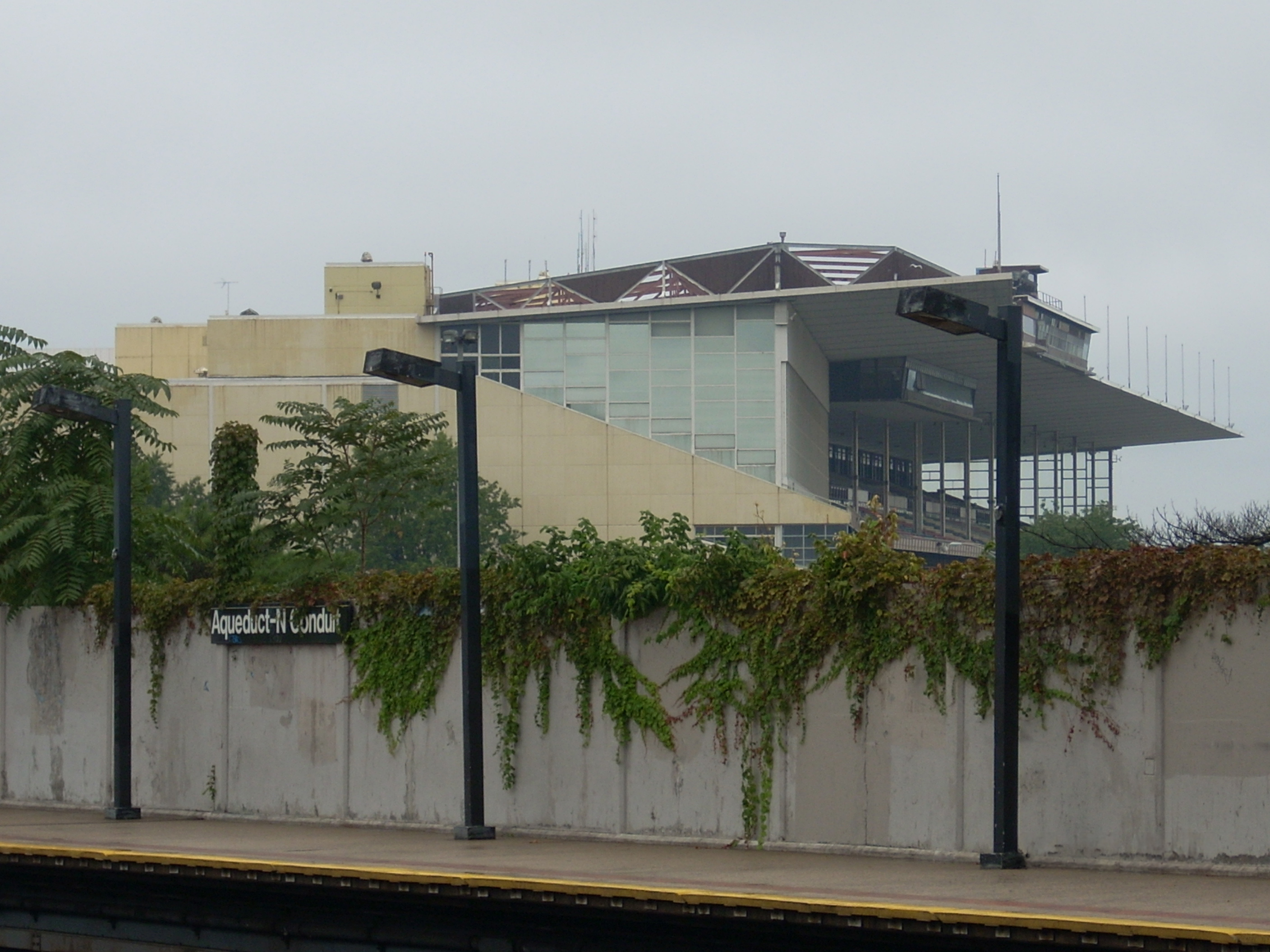
View of Aqueduct Racetrack from the Aqueduct–North Conduit Avenue subway station

The track has its own New York City Subway station, Aqueduct Racetrack, served by the IND Rockaway Line (A train). It has only one platform on the Brooklyn-bound side, requiring southbound travelers to transfer to a northbound train at Aqueduct–North Conduit Avenue station, which is located a few blocks to the south. NYRA also operates a free shuttle bus between the North Conduit Avenue station and the Clubhouse entrance.

The Q37 bus route serves Aqueduct Racetrack and was rerouted in 2011 to serve the casino. The Q7, Q11 and Q41 bus routes also pass nearby.

== In popular culture ==
- The film Lucky Number Slevin features scenes at "Aqueduct Racetrack", which were filmed at a track in Canada.
- There is a scene with Aqueduct Racetrack in the movie A Bronx Tale.
- The Sopranos episode "Pie-O-My" features a number of scenes at the racetrack.

== See also ==
- New York Racing Association
- Belmont Park
- Saratoga Race Course
