= Magnitude (horse) =

American racehorse

- Magnitude at the start of the 2026 Stephen Foster Stakes
- Breed: Thoroughbred
- Sire: Not This Time
- Grandsire: Giant's Causeway
- Dam: Rockadelic
- Damsire: Bernardini
- Sex: Colt
- Foaled: March 12, 2022 (age 4); Kentucky, United States
- Country: United States
- Color: Bay
- Breeder: Ron Stolich
- Owner: Winchell Thoroughbreds LLC
- Trainer: Steve Asmussen
- Jockey: José Ortiz
- Record: 15: 8-2-1
- Earnings: US$9,782,365

Major wins
- Risen Star Stakes (2025); Iowa Derby (2025); Clark Stakes (2025); Razorback Handicap (2026); Dubai World Cup (2026); Stephen Foster Stakes (2026)

Magnitude (foaled March 12, 2022) is a retired American thoroughbred racehorse who won the 2026 Dubai World Cup and 2026 Stephen Foster Stakes.

== Background ==
Magnitude is trained by Steve Asmussen and owned by Winchell Thoroughbreds LLC. He was bred by Ron Stolich in Lexington, Kentucky at Ballyrankin Stud.

Magnitude's sire is Not This Time, the winner of the 2016 Iroquois Stakes. Not This Time has produced multiple graded stakes winners before Magnitude, siring the likes of Epicenter, Up to the Mark, and Rhetorical.

Magnitude's dam is Rockadelic. The mare was by Bernardini and out of Octave. She raced once at Delaware Park in a Maiden Special Weight, finishing 7th. She shortly retired afterwards to have a career as a broodmare.

Magnitude comes from family 3-e, a thoroughbred family that has produced multiple successful racehorses. Some of the notable horses family 3-e has produced include; Palestine, the 1950 2000 Guinness Stakes Winner; Wajima, the 1975 Travers Stakes Winner; Wild Again, the inaugural Breeders' Cup Classic Winner in 1984; and Sunday Silence, the 1989 Kentucky Derby, 1989 Preakness Stakes, and 1989 Breeders' Cup Classic Winner.

In November 2022, he was purchased as a weanling (Hip: 892) by FMQ Stables at the Keeneland Breeding Stock Sale for $310,000. The next year, he was purchased as a yearling (Hip: 684) by Winchell Thoroughbreds at the Keeneland September Yearling Sale for $450,000.

== Racing career ==
=== 2024: two-year-old season ===
In 2024 Magnitude raced 5 times, winning twice. He debuted at Churchill Downs on June 6, ridden by Tyler Gaffalione and finished 4th.

On July 20, he then broke his maiden at Ellis Park, ridden by Erik Asmussen.

On September 14, he started in his first graded race, the Grade 3 Iroquois Stakes at Churchill Downs. He was ridden again by Tyler Gaffalione and finished 7th.

On November 17, Magnitude raced in an Allowance Optional Claiming race at Churchill Downs. Ridden by Erik Asmussen, he won the race.

Magnitude finished his 2024 season on December 21 in the Listed Gun Runner Stakes at Fair Grounds. This was the first of many races he entered that are a part of the Road to the Kentucky Derby series. Ridden by José Ortiz, he finished 2nd, and earned 5 points towards entering the Kentucky Derby.

Magnitude's Racing Silks

=== 2025: three-year-old season ===
In his Classic year Magnitude started the season by racing in the Grade 3 Lecomte Stakes on January 18 at Fair Grounds. Ridden by José Ortiz, Magnitude finished 6th.

On February 15 at Fair Grounds, Magnitude raced in the Grade 2 Risen Star Stakes. Ridden by Ben Curtis, after the gate opened, Magnitude took the lead. Once he entered the homestretch, he lengthened his lead to win it by 9 3/4 lengths and set a new track record for the race. Winning the race awarded him 50 points towards the Kentucky Derby; his points totaling up to 55 after the Risen Star Stakes. This guaranteed Magnitude a spot in the race, however, he had to miss the Triple Crown season due to an ankle chip injury. Sovereignty would later go on to win the 2025 Kentucky Derby and 2025 Belmont Stakes, while Journalism would win the 2025 Preakness Stakes.

After recovering from his injury, Magnitude made a comeback on July 5, starting in the Listed Iowa Derby at Prairie Meadows. Ridden by Ben Curtis, he finished the race led from start to finish and won the race by 9 1/4 lengths.

Magnitude then entered his first Grade 1 race, the Travers Stakes, on August 23 at Saratoga, once again ridden by Ben Curtis. Also entered in the race was the year's Kentucky Derby and Belmont Stakes winner Sovereignty. Magnitude got a clean start after gate opened and led the pack for a majority of the race. However, in last corner he was passed by Bracket Buster and Sovereignty. The two then dueled for lead in homestretch, and the race was won by Sovereignty, while Magnitude finished 3rd, 20 3/4 lengths behind.

He then was entered in another Grade 1 race on September 20, starting in the Pennsylvania Derby at Parx Racing racetrack. Ridden by Ben Curtis, after the gate opened, Magnitude settled in the middle of the pack. On homestretch, he attempted to pass Baeza, who placed 3rd in the 2025 Kentucky Derby, but failed, finishing 2nd.

Magnitude wrapped up the 2025 season by starting in the Grade 2 Clark Stakes on November 28 at Churchill Downs as the favorite. Ridden by José Ortiz, after gate opened Magnitude battled the 2025 Kentucky Derby alumni Chunk of Gold for the lead, but settled for 2nd. On the homestretch, he dueled Chunk of Gold again, and got the lead from him with 100 meters left in the race. He held the lead from the incoming Hit Show, the 2025 Dubai World Cup Winner, and won by 1 1/2 lengths. By the end of the season, he had started 6 times and won thrice.

=== 2026: four-year-old season ===
Magnitude was initially going to begin his four year old season by starting in the Grade 1 Saudi Cup. However, the horse developed a fever and was unable to shuttle to Saudi Arabia for the race. Instead, Magnitude began the season by starting in the Grade 3 Razorback Handicap at Oaklawn Park on February 28, ridden by José Ortiz. Nu What's New led the pack for the majority of the race, with Magnitude positioned closely behind him. Magnitude took the lead from the outside towards the end of the race, and won by 3 3/4 lengths.

Continuing to mirror the racing schedule of Gun Runner, a previous horse trained by Steve Asmussen, Magnitude was entered in the Dubai World Cup after his victory at Oaklawn Park. The 2025 Breeder's Cup Classic winner and dual 2025 and 2026 Saudi Cup winner Forever Young was also entered in the race. His team sought to win the race after Forever Young had lost it the previous year. On March 28, the race was held at Meydan Racecourse in the United Arab Emirates, with a field of 9. It was held while the United Arab Emirates was involved in the 2026 Iran War. There were some concerns for the participants safety, but ultimately the war had no effect on the race itself. Magnitude lead from the gate and never lost his position, winning the race wire-to-wire. Forever Young attempted to catch up with him at around the 600 meter mark, but was unable to close the distance, leaving Magnitude to win by 1 length. This was Steve Asmussen's second time training a Dubai World Cup winner after Curlin won it in 2008. He had attempted a second win with Gun Runner in 2017, but the horse came in 2nd to Arrogate.

After his success in the Dubai World Cup, Magnitude was shuttled back to the United States to prepare for the Stephen Foster Stakes. The field was initially going to be seven, but two horses were scratched from the race. The field consisted of two horses Magnitude had faced before, Baeza and Sovereignty, and two horses he had not, White Abarrio, a multiple time Grade 1 race winner, and Willy D's. The race was held on June 27 at Churchill Downs. Before the race began, Magnitude busted through the gate after the field loaded. An assistant kept hold of him, and he was promptly reloaded back into the gate after a brief examination. When the race began, Magnitude broke cleanly, leading the pack from the start. He kept his position for the entirety of the race, fending off Baeza and finishing 1 1/4 lengths ahead of him. Sovereignty, the favorite, had his second loss in a row after the 2026 Oaklawn Handicap, finishing 5 1/4 lengths behind in 3rd. White Abarrio finished 4th and Willy D's finished 5th. After the race, Steve Asmussen said, "11,266 career wins and that’s the first one I’ve ever had after breaking through the gate beforehand."

Magnitude planned to continue on the Gun Runner Path, targeting the Whitney Stakes, the Woodward Stakes, and the Breeders' Cup Classic. He would enter the Whitney Stakes on August 8 at Saratoga. He would break towards the front and angle for the lead, but Nitrogen would keep it for a majority of the race. On the far turn, Magnitude would fall back. He finished 15 1/4 lengths in behind, in 6th out of the 7 horse field, with White Abarrio behind him. Sovereignty would finish 1st, with Nitrogen 2nd.

== Stud Career ==
After his underwhelming performance in the Whitney Stakes, Magnitude's team opted to train the horse up to the Breeders' Cup Classic. However, Magnitude was scratched two days before the race after a PET scan indicated issues with suspensory fibers in his left foreleg. His retirement from racing was later confirmed by Coolmore's Ashford Stud division in Versailles, Kentucky, where he will stand at stud starting in 2027.

== Racing statistics ==
| Date | Age | Distance | Race | Grade | Track | Surface | Odds | Field | Gate Number | Finish | Winning Time | Winning (Losing) Margin | Winner (2nd Place) | Jockey | Ref |
|---|---|---|---|---|---|---|---|---|---|---|---|---|---|---|---|
| June 6, 2024 | 2 | 5 1/2 furlongs | Maiden Special Weight | | Churchill Downs | Dirt (Fast) | 3.21 | 8 | 6 | 4 | 1:05.77 | 2 1/4 lengths | Conquering Cat | Tyler Gaffalione | |
| July 20, 2024 | 2 | 7 furlongs | Maiden Special Weight | | Ellis Park | Dirt (Fast) | 2.78 | 9 | 8 | 1 | 1:24.00 | 5 3/4 lengths | (Morlock) | Erik Asmussen | |
| September 14, 2024 | 2 | 1 mile | Iroquois Stakes | III | Churchill Downs | Dirt (Fast) | 16.01 | 11 | 8 | 7 | 1:36.08 | 12 lengths | Jonathan's Way | Tyler Gaffalione | |
| November 17, 2024 | 2 | 1 1/16 miles | Allowance Optional Claiming | | Churchill Downs | Dirt (Fast) | 1.48* | 5 | 7 | 1 | 1:44.24 | 1 length | (California Burrito) | Erik Asmussen | |
| December 21, 2024 | 2 | 1 1/16 miles | Gun Runner Stakes | Listed | Fair Grounds | Dirt (Fast) | 2.60 | 5 | 3 | 2 | 1:43.53 | 6 3/4 lengths | Built | José Ortiz | |
| January 18, 2025 | 3 | 1 1/16 miles | Lecomte Stakes | III | Fair Grounds | Dirt (Sloppy) | 8.20 | 13 | 4 | 6 | 1:47.07 | 2 3/4 lengths | Disco Time | José Ortiz | |
| February 15, 2025 | 3 | 1 1/8 miles | Risen Star Stakes | II | Fair Grounds | Dirt (Fast) | 43.20 | 12 | 13 | 1 | R1:48.85 | 9 3/4 lengths | (Chunk of Gold) | Ben Curtis | |
| July 5, 2025 | 3 | 1 1/16 miles | Iowa Derby | Listed | Prairie Meadows | Dirt (Good) | 0.70* | 6 | 4 | 1 | 1:42.26 | 9 1/4 lengths | (Itsmybirthday) | Ben Curtis | |
| August 23, 2025 | 3 | 1 1/4 miles | Travers Stakes | I | Saratoga | Dirt (Fast) | 3.60 | 5 | 1 | 3 | 2:00.84 | 20 3/4 lengths | Sovereignty | Ben Curtis | |
| September 20, 2025 | 3 | 1 1/8 miles | Pennsylvania Derby | I | Parx Racing | Dirt (Fast) | 10.70 | 10 | 3 | 2 | 1:48.03 | 2 1/4 lengths | Baeza | Ben Curtis | |
| November 28, 2025 | 3 | 1 1/8 miles | Clark Stakes | II | Churchill Downs | Dirt (Fast) | 2.18* | 8 | 9 | 1 | 1:48.69 | 1 1/2 lengths | (Hit Show) | José Ortiz | |
| February 28, 2026 | 4 | 1 1/16 miles | Razorback Handicap | III | Oaklawn Park | Dirt (Fast) | 0.80* | 6 | 5 | 1 | 1:42.10 | 3 3/4 lengths | (Nu What's New) | José Ortiz | |
| March 28, 2026 | 4 | 1 1/4 miles | Dubai World Cup | I | Meydan Racecourse | Dirt (Fast) | 15/2 | 9 | 2 | 1 | 2:04.38 | 1 length | (Forever Young) | José Ortiz | |
| June 27, 2026 | 4 | 1 1/8 miles | Stephen Foster Stakes | I | Churchill Downs | Dirt (Sloppy) | 2.58 | 5 | 5 | 1 | 1:48.03 | 1 1/4 lengths | (Baeza) | José Ortiz | |
| August 8, 2026 | 4 | 1 1/8 miles | Whitney Stakes | I | Saratoga | Dirt (Fast) | 1.95* | 7 | 1 | 6 | 1:47.91 | 15 1/4 lengths | Sovereignty | José Ortiz | |

An asterisk (*) next to the odds means that Magnitude was the post time favorite.

A R on the time indicates the race was won in record time.

== Pedigree ==
Pedigree of Magnitude, bay colt, March 12, 2022, family 3-e
| Sire Not This Time (USA) | Giant's Causeway (USA) | Storm Cat (USA) | Storm Bird (CAN) |
| Sire Not This Time (USA) | Giant's Causeway (USA) | Storm Cat (USA) | Terlingua (USA) |
| Sire Not This Time (USA) | Giant's Causeway (USA) | Mariah's Storm (USA) | Rahy (USA) |
| Sire Not This Time (USA) | Giant's Causeway (USA) | Mariah's Storm (USA) | Immense (USA) |
| Sire Not This Time (USA) | Miss Macy Sue (USA) | Trippi (USA) | End Sweep (USA) |
| Sire Not This Time (USA) | Miss Macy Sue (USA) | Trippi (USA) | Jealous Appeal (USA) |
| Sire Not This Time (USA) | Miss Macy Sue (USA) | Yada Yada (USA) | Great Above |
| Sire Not This Time (USA) | Miss Macy Sue (USA) | Yada Yada (USA) | Stem (USA) |
| Dam Rockadelic (USA) | Bernardini (2003) | A.P. Indy (USA) | Seattle Slew (USA) |
| Dam Rockadelic (USA) | Bernardini (2003) | A.P. Indy (USA) | Weekend Surprise (USA) |
| Dam Rockadelic (USA) | Bernardini (2003) | Cara Rafaela (USA) | Quiet American (USA) |
| Dam Rockadelic (USA) | Bernardini (2003) | Cara Rafaela (USA) | Oil Fable (USA) |
| Dam Rockadelic (USA) | Octave (USA) | Unbridled's Song (USA) | Unbridled (USA) |
| Dam Rockadelic (USA) | Octave (USA) | Unbridled's Song (USA) | Trolley Song (USA) |
| Dam Rockadelic (USA) | Octave (USA) | Belle Nuit (USA) | Dr. Carter (USA) |
| Dam Rockadelic (USA) | Octave (USA) | Belle Nuit (USA) | Belle Noel (USA) |
