= Not This Time =

American-bred Thoroughbred racehorse

- Not This Time at Taylor Made Farm
- Sire: Giant's Causeway
- Grandsire: Storm Cat
- Dam: Miss Macy Sue
- Damsire: Trippi
- Sex: Stallion
- Foaled: April 26, 2014
- Country: United States
- Color: Dark Bay or Brown
- Breeder: Albaugh Family Stables
- Owner: Albaugh Family Stables
- Trainer: Dale L. Romans
- Record: 4: 2 - 1 - 0
- Earnings: $454,183

Major wins
- Iroquois Stakes (2016)

Not This Time (foaled April 26, 2014) is a retired American Thoroughbred racehorse and sire of Epicenter the 2022 American Champion Three-Year-Old Male Horse.

== Background ==
Not This Time is a dark bay or brown horse who was bred in Kentucky by Albaugh Family Stables. His sire Giant's Causeway was known in Europe as "The Iron Horse" after earning five consecutive Group One victories in a time span of just eleven weeks. Giant's Causeway then became a three-time leading sire in North America, whose notable offspring include Footstepsinthesand, Shamardal and Take Charge Brandi. The offspring of Giant's Causeway have been successful on both turf and dirt.

Not This Time is out of the Trippi mare Miss Macy Sue, who won the Grade III Winning Colors Stakes in 2007 and was placed in the Breeders' Cup Filly & Mare Sprint that year. Miss Macy Sue is also the dam of sire Liam's Map, a multiple grade I-winning millionaire who captured his most famous victory in the 2015 Grade I Breeders' Cup Dirt Mile, and stakes winner and placed in the GII Forward Gal Stakes filly Taylor S. Miss Macy Sue in 2017 produced a winner Matera from Tapit, and she has a Bodemeister colt in 2015. They reside at Taylor Made Farm, where Not This Time was raised and now takes up residence at stud.

== Career ==
Not This Time broke his maiden impressively by 10 lengths at Ellis Park Race Course on August 12, 2016, running a mile in 1:35.99 with a final eighth of a mile in 11.82 seconds while being geared down at the wire by jockey Robby Albarado. In his next start Not This Time rallied four wide in the far turn then drew off in the stretch to post an 8 3/4-length victory in the $150,000 G3 Iroquois Stakes on September 17, 2020, at Churchill Downs. In winning the Iroquois Stakes a Breeders' Cup Challenge "Win & You're In" race, Not This Time gained automatic entry to the Grade 1 Breeders' Cup Juvenile.

Not This Time was a runner-up finisher as the 5/2 favorite in the Grade 1 Breeders' Cup Juvenile by a neck to Classic Empire and 7 1/2 lengths ahead of Practical Joke. Not This Time sustained a career-ending soft tissue injury to his right front leg and was retired. Dennis Albaugh of Albaugh Family Stable said: "Not This Time ran such a huge 2-year old campaign, and being considered a top contender for next year's Kentucky Derby, it really saddens me that his racing career is ending too soon." Jockey Albarado commented on his retirement, "What I felt was extreme talent there. That was some kind of feeling. He's one of the best I've ever sat on." Trainer Romans also was disappointed. "It's a real shame to see him leave the barn before we got to see him fulfill his enormous potential, because there's no doubt in my mind he was as good of a Kentucky Derby contender as there is out there."

== Statistics ==
| Date | Distance | Race | Grade | Track | Odds | Field | Finish | Winning Time | Winning (Losing) Margin | Jockey | Ref |
|---|---|---|---|---|---|---|---|---|---|---|---|
2016 – two-year-old season
| Jun 30, 2016 | 6 furlongs | Maiden Special Weight | | Churchill Downs | 1.40* | 8 | 5 | 1:09.49 | (10 1/4 lengths) | Robby Albarado | |
| Aug 12, 2016 | 1 mile | Maiden Special Weight | | Ellis Park | 0.50* | 7 | 1 | 1:35.99 | 10 lengths | Robby Albarado | |
| Sep 17, 2016 | 1 1/16 miles | Iroquois Stakes | III | Churchill Downs | 1.00* | 8 | 1 | 1:45.22 | 8 3/4 lengths | Robby Albarado | |
| Nov 5, 2016 | 1 1/16 miles | Breeders' Cup Juvenile | I | Santa Anita | 2.80 | 12 | 2 | 1:42.60 | (neck) | Robby Albarado | |

Notes:
An (*) asterisk after the odds means Not This Time was the post-time favorite.

== Stud career ==
Taylor Made Stallions acquired a 50% stake in Not This Time from the owner and breeder, Albaugh Family Stable, and the colt stood in 2017 at their farm near Nicholasville, Kentucky, for US$15,000.

His runners shared his precociousness. Not This Time was the third-leading freshman sire of 2020 by progeny earnings. His runners got better with maturity, and he became the leader of his sire class during their second-crop, third-crop, and fourth-crop years. He was the leading fourth-crop sire by number of career black-type stakes winners (27) and graded stakes winners (12). More significantly, he was the youngest sire among the top 10 on the North American general leading sires list with more than $7.36 million in progeny earnings. The sire stood in 2023 for $135,000. At the Saratoga Fasig-Tipton Sale on August 8, 2023, a share to Taylor Made Stallions' top 10 North American sire Not This Time was sold for US$2 million to a syndicate. The share was purchased by a syndicate of five people who include Jon Green, the manager of the family-owned D.J. Stable. Green did the bidding on behalf of the syndicate, according to Taylor.

Highlighting his top performers are 2022 champion three-year-old colt and Travers Stakes winner Epicenter and Grade I winners and millionaires Sibelius and Up to the Mark. With the prominence of Not This Time's offspring, his stud fee for 2024 was increased to $150,000 and again for 2025, standing for $175,000.

=== Notable progeny ===
c = colt, f = filly, g = gelding

| Foaled | Name | Sex | Major Wins |
| 2018 | Just One Time | f | Madison Stakes (2022) |
| 2018 | Princess Noor | f | Del Mar Debutante (2020) |
| 2018 | Sibelius | g | Dubai Golden Shaheen (2023) |
| 2019 | Aegean Finale | c | Karayel (2021), (Note: The Karayel is a local Group 1 in Turkey (Part II in International Catalog Grading) 2YO event over 1300 meters at Ankara 75th Anniversary Race Course) Yavuz Sultan Selim (2023) (Note: The Yavuz Sultan Selim is a local Group 1 in Turkey for 3YOs and older over 1500 meters on the synthetic surface at Veliefendi Race Course in Istanbul) |
| 2019 | Cogburn | c | Jaipur Stakes (2024) |
| 2019 | Epicenter | c | Travers Stakes (2022) |
| 2019 | Up to the Mark | c | Manhattan Stakes, Turf Classic Stakes, Coolmore Turf Mile Stakes (2023) |
| 2020 | Sacred Wish | f | Matriarch Stakes (2024) |
| 2021 | Rhetorical | g | Coolmore Turf Mile Stakes (2025, 2026), Turf Classic Stakes (2026) |
| 2021 | In Our Time | f | Kentucky Downs Ladies Sprint Stakes (2026) |
| 2022 | Goal Oriented | c | Malibu Stakes (2025) |
| 2022 | Troubleshooting | c | Franklin-Simpson Stakes (2025) |
| 2022 | Magnitude | c | Dubai World Cup, Stephen Foster Stakes (2026) |
| 2023 | Cy Fair | f | Breeders' Cup Juvenile Turf Sprint (2025) |
| 2023 | Bodacious Bay | f | Cotillion Stakes (2026) |

== Pedigree ==
Pedigree of Not This Time, Dark Bay or Brown stallion, April 26, 2014
| Sire Giant's Causeway (1997) | Storm Cat (1983) | Storm Bird (CAN) (1978) | Northern Dancer (CAN) (1961) |
| Sire Giant's Causeway (1997) | Storm Cat (1983) | Storm Bird (CAN) (1978) | South Ocean (CAN) (1967) |
| Sire Giant's Causeway (1997) | Storm Cat (1983) | Terlingua (1978) | Secretariat (1970) |
| Sire Giant's Causeway (1997) | Storm Cat (1983) | Terlingua (1978) | Crimson Saint (1969) |
| Sire Giant's Causeway (1997) | Mariah's Storm (1991) | Rahy (1985) | Blushing Groom (FR) (1974) |
| Sire Giant's Causeway (1997) | Mariah's Storm (1991) | Rahy (1985) | Glorious Song (CAN) (1976) |
| Sire Giant's Causeway (1997) | Mariah's Storm (1991) | Immense (1979) | Roberto (1969) |
| Sire Giant's Causeway (1997) | Mariah's Storm (1991) | Immense (1979) | Imsodear (1967) |
| Dam Miss Macy Sue (2003) | Trippi (1997) | End Sweep (1991) | Forty Niner (1985) |
| Dam Miss Macy Sue (2003) | Trippi (1997) | End Sweep (1991) | Broom Dance (1979) |
| Dam Miss Macy Sue (2003) | Trippi (1997) | Jealous Appeal (1983) | Valid Appeal (1972) |
| Dam Miss Macy Sue (2003) | Trippi (1997) | Jealous Appeal (1983) | Jealous Cat (1975) |
| Dam Miss Macy Sue (2003) | Yada Yada (1996) | Great Above (1972) | Minnesota Mac (1964) |
| Dam Miss Macy Sue (2003) | Yada Yada (1996) | Great Above (1972) | Ta Wee (1966) |
| Dam Miss Macy Sue (2003) | Yada Yada (1996) | Stem (1982) | Damascus (1964) |
| Dam Miss Macy Sue (2003) | Yada Yada (1996) | Stem (1982) | Tweak (1976)(family 1-r) |
