= Bernard S. Flint =

Racehorse trainer

Personal information
- Born: January 15, 1940 (age 86) New Orleans, Louisiana, United States
- Occupations: Racehorse trainer & owner

Horse racing career
- Sport: Horse racing
- Career wins: 3,521 (as at 2020/08/24)

Major racing wins
- Clipsetta Stakes (1983, 1993, 2006); Lexington Stakes (1984); Churchill Downs Stakes (1986, 1987); Gowell Stakes (1993, 2002, 2004, 2005); Astoria Stakes (1998); Hawthorne Derby (1998); Latonia Stakes (1998, 1999, 2003, 2005); Prioress Stakes (1998); Endine Stakes (1999); Azalea Stakes (2000); Gallant Bob Stakes (2000); Deputy Minister Handicap (2000); Forego Stakes (2000, 2001); Inside Information Stakes (2001, 2019); Rampart Handicap (2001); Super Derby (2001); Tejano Run Stakes (2002, 2004, 2005); Prairie Bayou Stakes (2003, 2004); Alcibiades Stakes (2004); Arlington Oaks (2004); Golden Rod Stakes (2004, 2012); Monmouth Oaks (2013); Mint Julep Handicap (2014, 2018); American Derby (2016); Doubledogdare Stakes (2016); Galorette Handicap (2016); Jefferson Cup Stakes (2016)

Racing awards
- Training titles: Churchill Downs: 1 - Spring (1994) Ellis Park: 11 - (1989, 1991-1993, 1995, 1997-2002) Keeneland: 1 - Fall (2000) Turfway Park: 6 - Winter/Spring (1998-2003); 4 - Fall (1998, 2001-2003); 10 - Holiday meet (1991-1994, 1997-1998, 2001-2004)

Significant horses
- Outofthebox, Hurricane Bertie, Runway Model, Seaneen Girl

Bernard S. Flint (born January 15, 1940, in New Orleans, Louisiana) is a former New Orleans Police Department detective turned Thoroughbred racehorse trainer who won his 3,500th race on September 13, 2019, at Indiana Grand Race Track.

A graduate of Loyola University and the New Orleans Police Academy, Bernard Flint trained horses on a part-time basis from 1969 until 1976 when he retired from the police force.

His son Steven is also a trainer in Throughbred racing.
