= Kentucky Cup Juvenile Fillies Stakes =

- Class: Ungraded Stakes
- Location: Turfway Park; Florence, Kentucky, United States
- Inaugurated: 1994
- Race type: Thoroughbred - Flat racing
- Website: www.turfway.com

Race information
- Distance: 1 mile (8 furlongs)
- Surface: Polytrack
- Track: left-handed
- Qualification: Two-Year-Old fillies
- Weight: Assigned
- Purse: $100,000

The Kentucky Cup Juvenile Fillies Stakes is an American Thoroughbred horse race run annually at Turfway Park in Florence, Kentucky. A Listed race run near the end of September, it is open to two-year-old fillies and is contested on Polytrack synthetic dirt at a distance of one mile (eight furlongs).

The counterpart to the Kentucky Cup Juvenile Stakes, both races were discontinued in 2009 due to financial restraints. The event offered a purse of $100,000 in 2008.

With the support of WinStar Farm, this race which was suspended in 2009 and 2010 due to economic challenges, will return in 2011.

== Records ==
Speed record

- 1:36.60 – Love That Jazz (1996)

Most wins by a jockey

- 2 – Gary Stevens (1995, 1998)
- 2 – Mike E. Smith (1996, 2002)
- 2 – Edgar Prado (1999, 2003)

Most wins by a trainer

- 2 – D. Wayne Lukas (1994, 1995)
- 2 – Robert E. Holthus (2001, 2005)
- 2 – Bob Baffert (2002, 2003)
- 2 – Steve Asmussen (2004, 2007)

Most wins by an owner

- 2 – William Heiligbrodt (1999, 2004)

== Winners ==
Year	Winner	Jockey	Trainer	Owner	Time
2011	Charming Vixon	Calvin Borel	Tom Amoss		
2010	Not run				
2009	Not run				
2008	Sugar Mom	Manuel Aguilar	Wayne A. Catalano	Frank C. Calabrese	1:37.86
2007	Sky Mom	Terry J. Thompson	Steve Asmussen	Heather Stark	1:38.11
2006	Cohiba Miss	Willie Martinez	Bernard S. Flint	Mike Rutherford	1:36.68
2005	Beau Dare	John McKee	Robert E. Holthus	Walts David Stable LLC	1:38.93
2004	Punch Appeal	Shane Sellers	Steve Asmussen	Heiligbrodt Stable & Burning Daylight Farm	1:38.04
2003	Class Above	Edgar Prado	Bob Baffert	Padua Stables	1:39.04
2002	Atlantic Ocean	Mike E. Smith	Bob Baffert	The Thoroughbred Corp.	1:40.39
2001	Playing N' Gold	Joe Judice	Robert E. Holthus	Kenneth English & Alan Braun	1:37.20
2000	Miss Pickums	Francisco Torres	Paul J. McGee	Siegel family	1:40.13
1999	Regally Appealing	Edgar Prado	John C. Kimmel	William Heiligbrodt	1:41.00
1998	Grand Deed	Gary Stevens	Kenneth McPeek	Andrew Ruzicho	1:38.60
1997	Nurse Goodbody	Eddie Martin, Jr.	Joe Petalino	E. L. Gaylord & Lazy E Racing	1:38.60
1996	Love That Jazz	Mike E. Smith	Nick Zito	Irving & Marjorie Cowan	1:36.60
1995	Tipically Irish	Gary Stevens	D. Wayne Lukas	Michael Tabor	1:37.80
1994	Cat Appeal	Jerry D. Bailey	D. Wayne Lukas	Overbrook Farm	1:40.20
