= Iowa Oaks (Prairie Meadows) =

- Class: Listed
- Location: Prairie Meadows; Altoona, Iowa, United States
- Inaugurated: 1989
- Race type: Thoroughbred - Flat racing
- Website: www.prairiemeadows.com

Race information
- Distance: 1 1/16 miles
- Surface: Dirt
- Track: left-handed
- Qualification: Fillies, three years old
- Weight: 121 lbs with allowances
- Purse: $225,000 (since 2021)

The Iowa Oaks is a Listed American Thoroughbred horse race for three years old fillies, over a distance of 1 1/16 miles on the dirt held annually in early July at Prairie Meadows in Altoona, Iowa. As of 2025 the event carried a purse of US$225,000.

== History ==
The race was inaugurated in 1989 at a distance of 1 mile in was run in late April.

However, the event was idle for five years from 1990 to 1994. When the track administration resumed the event it was known as the Heartland Oaks and it was extended to the current distance of 1 1/16 miles and scheduled in July. In 1995 the racetrack added slot machines and the venue was able to increase stakes thus attracting better quality horses. In 1998 the administration of the track reverted the name of the event back to the Iowa Derby.

In 2004 the event was upgraded to Grade III.

In 2020, the purse for the race was reduced, along with the purses for the Cornhusker Handicap and Iowa Derby, due to the COVID-19 pandemic. It was $225,000 in 2025.

In 2024 the event was downgraded by the Thoroughbred Owners and Breeders Association to Listed status.

== Records ==
Speed record:

- 1 1/16 miles – 1:41.64 – Wildwood Royal (2003)

Margins:

- 8 3/4 lengths – Unbridled Elaine (2001)

Most wins by a jockey:

- 2 – Ricardo Santana Jr. (2018, 2019)
- 2 – Rafael Bejarano (2006, 2007)
- 2 – Robert Dean Williams (1997, 1998)

Most wins by a trainer:

- 4 – Steven M. Asmussen (1997, 2009, 2018, 2019)

Most wins by an owner:

- 2 – Claiborne Farm (2000, 2013)
- 2 – Winchell Thoroughbreds (1997, 2009)

== Winners ==
Year	Winner	Jockey	Trainer	Owner	Distance	Time	Purse	Grade	Ref
Iowa Oaks
2026	Mizumi	Florent Geroux	Bob Baffert	Baoma Corporation	1 1/16 miles	1:43.54	$213,750	Listed	
2025	Quickick	Brian Hernandez Jr	Thomas M. Amoss	Greenwell Thoroughbreds	1 1/16 miles	1:45.39	$242,920	Listed	
2024	Just Basking	Chris Landeros	Ian R. Wilkes	Gilder Schwarz Farm	1 1/16 miles	1:43.40	$220,500	Listed	
2023	Crypto Mo	Cindy Murphy	Travis S. Murphy	Travis S. Murphy, Matt Trent & Triple V Racing	1 1/16 miles	1:44.16	$225,000	III	
2022	Butterbean	Glenn W. Corbett	Kenneth G. McPeek	Magdalena Racing & William Klimashousky	1 1/16 miles	1:43.72	$225,000	III	
2021	Army Wife	Joel Rosario	Michael J. Maker	Three Diamonds Farm	1 1/16 miles	1:43.10	$225,000	III	
2020	Flat Out Speed	Alex L. Canchari	Lynn Chleborad	Poindexter Thoroughbreds	1 1/16 miles	1:42.79	$122,200	III	
2019	Lady Apple	Ricardo Santana Jr.	Steven M. Asmussen	Phoenix Thoroughbred III and KatieRich Stable	1 1/16 miles	1:43.33	$200,000	III	
2018	She's a Julie	Ricardo Santana Jr.	Steven M. Asmussen	Whispering Oaks Farm	1 1/16 miles	1:43.33	$200,000	III	
2017	Shane's Girlfriend	Kyle Frey	Doug F. O'Neill	ERJ Racing, W.C. Racing & Dennis O'Neill	1 1/16 miles	1:43.94	$203,483	III	
2016	Family Tree	Florent Geroux	Wayne M. Catalano	Gary and Mary West	1 1/16 miles	1:43.25	$200,000	III	
2015	Sarah Sis	Julio E. Felix	Ingrid Mason	Joe Ragsdale	1 1/16 miles	1:45.17	$200,000	III	
2014	Size	Junior Alvarado	William I. Mott	Claiborne Farm & Adele B. Dilschneider	1 1/16 miles	1:43.64	$200,000	III	
2013	Fiftyshadesofhay	Martin Garcia	Bob Baffert	Karl Watson, Michael E. Pegram & Paul Weitman	1 1/16 miles	1:44.65	$200,000	III	
2012	Uptown Bertie	Julien R. Leparoux	Steve Margolis	Richard, Bertram & Elaine Klein	1 1/16 miles	1:43.34	$200,000	III	
2011	Little Miss Holly	Corey J. Lanerie	Steve Margolis	Gold Square	1 1/16 miles	1:43.66	$200,000	III	
2010	Seeking the Title	Calvin H. Borel	Dallas Stewart	Charles E. Fipke	1 1/16 miles	1:41.84	$200,000	III	
2009	Hightap	Shaun Bridgmohan	Steven M. Asmussen	Winchell Thoroughbreds & Gainesway Thoroughbreds	1 1/16 miles	1:44.00	$200,000	III	
2008	Storm Mesa	Eddie Martin Jr.	W. Bret Calhoun	Richard L. Davis	1 1/16 miles	1:41.89	$200,000	III	
2007	Marietta	Rafael Bejarano	Eoin G. Harty	Darley Stable	1 1/16 miles	1:43.17	$200,000	III	
2006	Baghdaria	Rafael Bejarano	Thomas M. Amoss	Clinton C. & Susan A. Atkins	1 1/16 miles	1:43.12	$200,000	III	
2005	Whimsy	Carlos H. Marquez Jr.	Michael Stidham	Pin Oak Stable	1 1/16 miles	1:43.60	$122,500	III	
2004	He Loves Me	Jozbin Z. Santana	Richard W. Small	Buckingham Farm	1 1/16 miles	1:42.80	$125,000	III	
2003	Wildwood Royal	Danush Sukie	Jimmy Zook	William Stiritz	1 1/16 miles	1:41.64	$125,000	Listed	
2002	Lost At Sea	Terry J. Thompson	Jerry Hollendorfer	Peter Abruzzo, John Franks & Jerry Hollendorfer	1 1/16 miles	1:42.27	$150,000	Listed	
2001	Unbridled Elaine	Pat Day	David R. Vance	Roger J. Devenport	1 1/16 miles	1:43.88	$150,000	Listed	
2000	Trip	Willie Martinez	Frank L. Brothers	Claiborne Farm	1 1/16 miles	1:43.56	$150,000	Listed	
1999	Golden Temper	Shane Sellers	W. Elliott Walden	Mark Stanley & Double R Stables	1 1/16 miles	1:42.95	$125,000	Listed	
Heartland Oaks
1998	Nickel Classic	Robert Dean Williams	Mark Danner	Calvin L. Johnston	1 1/16 miles	1:43.47	$100,000	Listed	
1997	Lucinda	Robert Dean Williams	Steven M. Asmussen	Verne H. Winchell	1 1/16 miles	1:45.71	$50,000	Listed	
1996	Rewana's Okie	Cindy Murphy	Clinton C. Stuart	Richard Wheeler Jr.	1 1/16 miles	1:45.17	$35,000		
1995	Beau's Princess	David Wilder Essman	David C. Anderson	Blue Jay Stable	1 1/16 miles	1:44.00	$25,000		
1990–1994		Race not held							
Iowa Oaks
1989	Clickety Click	Kelly Michael Murray	Terrence W. Dunlavy	Viking Farms Ltd	1 mile	1:38.80	$25,000		
