= Terry J. Thompson =

American jockey

Terry Thompson
Personal information
- Born: August 7, 1971 (age 55) Omaha, Nebraska, United States
- Occupation: Jockey

Horse racing career
- Sport: Horse racing
- Career wins: 2,781 (ongoing)

Major racing wins
- Pioneer Stakes (1996, 2000); Wishing Well Stakes (1996); John Battaglia Memorial Stakes (2000); Southwest Stakes (2001, 2003); Delta Princess Stakes (2002); Arkansas Derby (2003); Fantasy Stakes (2003); Acorn Stakes (2004); Martha Washington Stakes (2005, 2007, 2008); Kentucky Cup Juvenile Fillies Stakes (2007); Monmouth Oaks (2008, 2011); Philip H. Iselin Stakes (2008); Black-Eyed Susan Stakes (2009); Gazelle Stakes (2010); Honeybee Stakes (2010); Molly Pitcher Stakes (2010); Monmouth Beach Stakes (2010)

Racing awards
- Prairie Meadows Champion Jockey (2000, 2001, 2002, 2003, 2007, 2008, 2009); Oaklawn Park Champion Jockey (2009, 2010)

Significant horses
- Eight Belles, Just Jenda, Old Fashioned, Payton d'Oro, Ruby's Reception, Sure Shot Biscuit, Tejano Run

Terry John Thompson (born August 7, 1971 in Omaha, Nebraska) is an American jockey in Thoroughbred horse racing who, as at December 8, 2011, has won 2781 races during his career that began in 1993 at Turfway Park in Florence, Kentucky.

On May 20, 2002, Terry Thompson set a Prairie Meadows Racetrack record when he rode six winners on a single racecard. He was the existing co-holder of the record with five wins. At the same racetrack, he won four straight riding titles between 2000 and 2003 before breaking a leg in 2004. He returned to win three more titles consecutively between 2007 and 2009. Thompson also won back-to-back riding titles at Oaklawn Park in 2009 and 2010.

== Year-end charts ==
Chart (2000–present)	Peak position
National Earnings List for Jockeys 2000	65
National Earnings List for Jockeys 2001	54
National Earnings List for Jockeys 2002	60
National Earnings List for Jockeys 2003	53
National Earnings List for Jockeys 2006	86
National Earnings List for Jockeys 2007	72
National Earnings List for Jockeys 2008	97
National Earnings List for Jockeys 2009	47
National Earnings List for Jockeys 2010	51
National Earnings List for Jockeys 2011	53
National Earnings List for Jockeys 2012	75
National Earnings List for Jockeys 2013	87
