= Kentucky Cup Juvenile Stakes =

- Class: Ungraded Stakes
- Location: Turfway Park; Florence, Kentucky, United States
- Inaugurated: 1989
- Race type: Thoroughbred - Flat racing
- Website: www.turfway.com

Race information
- Distance: 1 1/16 miles (8.5 furlongs)
- Surface: Polytrack
- Track: left-handed
- Qualification: Two-year-olds colts
- Weight: Assigned
- Purse: $100,000

The Kentucky Cup Juvenile Stakes is an American Thoroughbred horse race run annually in late September as part of Kentucky Cup Day at Turfway Park in the Cincinnati, Ohio suburb of Florence, Kentucky.

A 1 1/16 miles (8.5 furlongs) Grade III race for two-year-old colts, it was raced on natural dirt until 2005 when Turfway Park installed the new synthetic Polytrack surface. For 2009, the race was downgraded from a Grade III event to ungraded status and, along with its counterpart for filles, the Kentucky Cup Juvenile Fillies Stakes, was then discontinued due to financial restraints. The event offered a purse of $100,000 in 2008.

Inaugurated in 1989 as the In Memoriam Stakes, the Kentucky Cup Juvenile Stakes was also run as the Alysheba Stakes from 1989 to 1993.

With the support of WinStar Farm, this race which was suspended in 2009 and 2010 due to economic challenges, will return in 2011. The Juvenile has lost its grade III ranking because it was not run for two consecutive years (2009–10).

== Records ==
Time record

- 1:42.89 - Boston Harbor (1996)

Most wins by an owner

- 2 - Overbrook Farm (1995, 1996) and Padua Stables (1999, 2002)

Most wins by a jockey

- 3 - Mike E. Smith (1997, 2002, 2006)

Most wins by a trainer

- 3 - D. Wayne Lukas (1995, 1996, 1999)

== Winners since 1991 ==
Year	Winner	Jockey	Trainer	Owner	Time
2011	Hansen	Victor Lebron	Mike Maker	Kendall Hanson	1:45.83
2010	Not run				
2009	Not run				
2008	West Side Bernie	Stewart Elliott	Kelly Breen	Lori & George Hall	1:44.22
2007	Texas Fever	Julien Leparoux	Mike Stidham	Stonerside Stables	1:44.95
2006	U D Ghetto	Mike E. Smith	Anthony Reinstedler	Lucky Seven Stable	1:43.86
2005	Stream Cat	Gary Stevens	Patrick L. Biancone	Fab Oak Stable et al.	1:46.42
2004	Greater Good	John McKee	Robert Holthus	Lewis S. Lakin	1:44.96
2003	Mr. Jester	Rafael Bejarano	Steve Wren	Karen J. Biggs	1:46.61
2002	Vindication	Mike E. Smith	Bob Baffert	Padua Stables	1:46.70
2001	Repent	Tony D'Amico	Kenneth McPeek	Select Stable	1:45.78
2000	Point Given	Shane Sellers	Bob Baffert	The Thoroughbred Corp.	1:47.01
1999	Millencolin	Pat Day	D. Wayne Lukas	Padua Stables	1:47.02
1998	Aly's Alley	Patrick A. Johnson	John J. Tammaro, Jr.	Eaglestone Farm	1:45.63
1997	Laydown	Mike E. Smith	Nicholas Zito	James McIngvale	1:43.17
1996	Boston Harbor	Donna Barton	D. Wayne Lukas	Overbrook Farm	1:42.89
1995	Editor's Note	Gary Stevens	D. Wayne Lukas	Overbrook Farm	1:45.07
1994	Tejano Run	Jerry D. Bailey	Kenneth McPeek	Roy K. Monroe	1:46.10
1993	Bibury Court	Scott Saito	Margaret Grimm	Margaret Grimm	1:47.60
1992	Mountain Cat	Charles Woods Jr.	D. Wayne Lukas	Overbrook Farm	1:43.50
1991	Star Recruit	Ricardo Lopez	Jerry Fanning	Dan Dar Farm	1:45.68
