= Wishing Well (horse) =

American-bred Thoroughbred racehorse

- Sire: Understanding
- Grandsire: Promised Land
- Dam: Mountain Flower
- Damsire: Montparnasse II
- Sex: Mare
- Foaled: April 12, 1975
- Died: 1999
- Country: United States
- Colour: Bay
- Breeder: George A. Pope, Jr.
- Owner: Mr. or Mrs. Michael Lima
- Trainer: Gary F. Jones
- Record: 38: 12-6-8
- Earnings: US$$381,625

Major wins
- Autumn Days Handicap (1979); Convenience Stakes (1979, 1980); National Orange Show Purse (1980); Gamely Handicap (1980); Wilshire Handicap (1980); Las Cienegas Handicap (1981)

Honours
- Wishing Well Stakes at Santa Anita; Wishing Well Stakes at Turfway Park

Wishing Well (foaled April 12, 1975 in California – died 1999 in Ireland) was an American Thoroughbred racing mare who won twelve of her thirty-six starts and who secured her place in Thoroughbred history as the dam of Sunday Silence, the 1989 Kentucky Derby, Preakness Stakes and Breeders' Cup Classic winner who was voted American Horse of the Year, inducted in the U.S. Racing Hall of Fame in 1996, and who was the Leading sire in Japan for thirteen straight years between 1995 and 2007.

Wishing Well died at Coolmore Stud in Ireland at age twenty-four in 1999 as a result of complications from colic.

== Pedigree ==
Pedigree of Wishing Well
Sire Understanding 1963 ch.	Promised Land; 1954 gr.	Palestinian	Sun Again
Sire Understanding 1963 ch.	Promised Land; 1954 gr.	Palestinian	Dolly Whisk
Sire Understanding 1963 ch.	Promised Land; 1954 gr.	Mahmoudess	Mahmoud
Sire Understanding 1963 ch.	Promised Land; 1954 gr.	Mahmoudess	Forever Yours
Sire Understanding 1963 ch.	Pretty Ways; 1953 b.	Stymie	Equestrian
Sire Understanding 1963 ch.	Pretty Ways; 1953 b.	Stymie	Stop Watch
Sire Understanding 1963 ch.	Pretty Ways; 1953 b.	Pretty Jo	Bull Lea
Sire Understanding 1963 ch.	Pretty Ways; 1953 b.	Pretty Jo	Fib
Dam Mountain Flower 1964 b.	Montparnasse; 1956 b.	Gulf Stream	Hyperion
Dam Mountain Flower 1964 b.	Montparnasse; 1956 b.	Gulf Stream	Tide-way
Dam Mountain Flower 1964 b.	Montparnasse; 1956 b.	Mignon	Fox Club
Dam Mountain Flower 1964 b.	Montparnasse; 1956 b.	Mignon	Mi Condesa
Dam Mountain Flower 1964 b.	Edelweiss; 1959 b.	Hillary	Khaled
Dam Mountain Flower 1964 b.	Edelweiss; 1959 b.	Hillary	Snow Bunny
Dam Mountain Flower 1964 b.	Edelweiss; 1959 b.	Dowager	Free France
Dam Mountain Flower 1964 b.	Edelweiss; 1959 b.	Dowager	Marcellina
