= Vindication (horse) =

American-bred Thoroughbred racehorse

- Sire: Seattle Slew
- Grandsire: Bold Reasoning
- Dam: Strawberry Reason
- Damsire: Strawberry Road
- Sex: Stallion
- Foaled: 2000
- Country: United States
- Colour: Dark Bay
- Breeder: Payson Stud Inc.
- Owner: Padua Stables
- Trainer: Bob Baffert
- Record: 4: 4-0-0
- Earnings: $680,950

Major wins
- Kentucky Cup Juvenile Stakes (2002) Breeders' Cup wins: Breeders' Cup Juvenile (2002)

Awards
- American Champion Two-Year-Old Colt (2002)
- Last updated on September 14, 2007

Vindication (January 28, 2000 in Kentucky – July 10, 2008) was an American Thoroughbred Champion racehorse. Bred by Payson Stud Inc., he was sired by 1977 U.S. Triple Crown Champion Seattle Slew. Out of the mare Strawberry Reason, Vindication's damsire was Strawberry Road, the international star who raced in Australia, Germany, France, Japan, and the United States, and was voted the 1983 Australian Champion Racehorse of the Year and 1984 Champion Older Horse in Germany.

Vindication was purchased for $2.15 million at the 2001 Fasig-Tipton Saratoga sale by Satish Sanan's Padua Stables of Ocala, Florida, who handed him over to trainer Bob Baffert for race conditioning. Sent to the track at age two, Vindication won his first two races at Del Mar Racetrack in California. Then, on September 14 at Turfway Park in Florence, Kentucky, he captured the Grade III Kentucky Cup Juvenile Stakes by six lengths. He was then sent to Chicago's Arlington Park for the 2002 Breeders' Cup Juvenile. Though the race was normally run at a distance of 11/16 miles, the track setup at Arlington Park meant that year's Juvenile was raced at 1 1/8 miles (1.8 km). Ridden by Mike Smith, Vindication won by 2 3/4 lengths over Kafwain and Hold That Tiger, the latter a highly regarded colt from Ireland trained by Aidan O'Brien.

The runaway winner in the voting for 2002 American Champion Two-Year-Old Colt honors, Vindication was the winterbook favorite for the following spring's Kentucky Derby. However, as a result of a serious injury sustained early in 2003, Vindication never raced again and was retired.

A 2003 Keeneland Magazine article by Deirdre B. Biles called Vindication "one of the hottest stallion prospects in the country."

John G. Sikura purchased a one-third interest in the breeding rights to Vindication and since 2004 the horse has been standing at stud at his Hill 'n' Dale Farms in Lexington, Kentucky. His stud fee was $60,000. Vindication covered 78 mares in the 2007 season.

Vindication was euthanized on July 10, 2008, after suffering from a stomach rupture.

== Race Record ==
Date	Track	Race	Distance	Finish	Margin	Time
7/27/2002	Del Mar	Maiden	6 furlongs (3/4 mi; 1.2 km)	1	5 1/2	1:10 3/5
8/22/2002	Del Mar	Allowance	6 furlongs (3/4 mi; 1.2 km)	1	1 1/2	1:11 2/5
9/14/2002	Turfway Park	Kentucky Cup Juvenile Stakes	1 1/16 mi (8 1/2 furlongs; 1.7 km)	1	6	1:46 3/5
10/26/2002	Arlington Park	Breeders' Cup Juvenile	1 1/8 mi (9 furlongs; 1.8 km)	1	2 3/4	1:49 3/5

Average win margin: 4 lengths

== See also ==
- List of leading Thoroughbred racehorses
