= Iowa Oaks =

Iowa Oaks may refer to:

- Iowa Oaks (baseball), a Minor League Baseball team in Des Moines, Iowa, during 1969–1981; later known as the Iowa Cubs
- Iowa Oaks (Prairie Meadows), an American thoroughbred horse race at Prairie Meadows in Altoona, Iowa
