= Hansen (horse) =

American-bred Thoroughbred racehorse

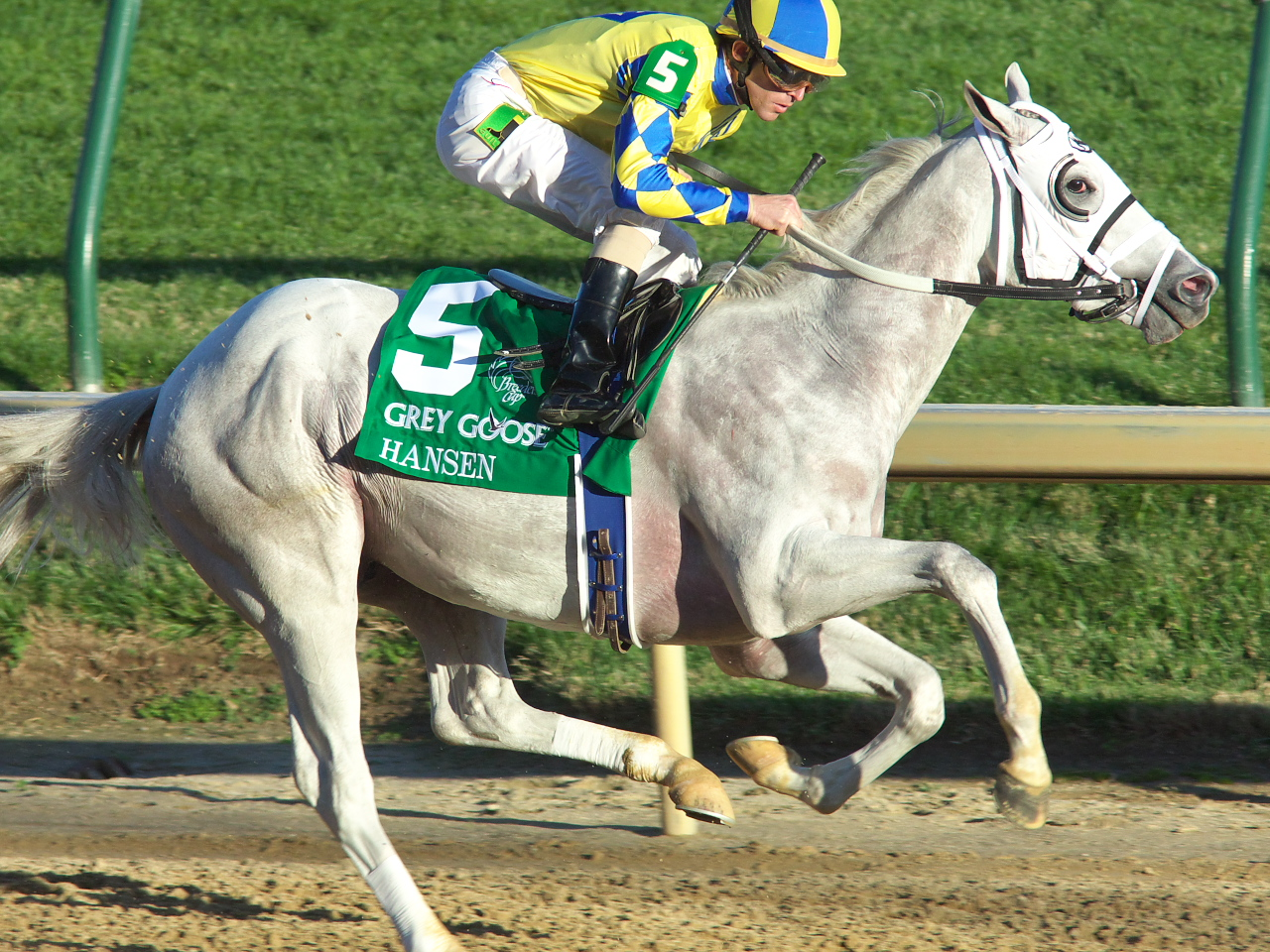
- Hansen wins the 2011 Breeders' Cup Juvenile
- Sire: Tapit
- Grandsire: Pulpit
- Dam: Stormy Sunday
- Damsire: Sir Cat
- Sex: Colt
- Foaled: April 23, 2009
- Country: United States
- Colour: Gray
- Breeder: Kendall E. Hansen
- Owner: Kendall E. Hansen, Sky Chai Stables
- Trainer: Michael J. Maker
- Record: 9: 5–2–0
- Earnings: $1,623,305

Major wins
- Breeders' Cup Juvenile (2011); Kentucky Cup Juvenile (2011); Gotham Stakes (2012); Iowa Derby (2012)

Awards
- American Champion Two-Year-Old Colt (2011)

Hansen (foaled April 23, 2009 in Kentucky), nicknamed 'White Lightning' and 'The Great White Hope', is a grey American Thoroughbred racehorse. Out of the Sir Cat mare Stormy Sunday, he is sired by Tapit. He is famous for having a coat that has grayed out to white far more rapidly than is typical, which led sportscaster Frank DeFord to describe him as a "four-legged Steve Martin. He is named after his owner and breeder, Dr. Kendall Hansen. He was trained by Mike Maker, and his regular jockey was Ramon Dominguez.

== Racing career ==
In his two-year-old season, Hansen was lightly raced. He had two wins at Turfway Park over distances of 1 1/16 miles and 5 1/2 furlongs. After winning the Kentucky Cup Juvenile Stakes, he then went to Churchill Downs and won the Breeders' Cup Juvenile over Union Rags. on November 5, 2011. Sent off at odds of 7–1, Hansen broke sharply from post 5 under Dominguez and set fractions of :23.26, :47.39, and 1:12.24 on a fast main track with Speightscity, Fort Loudon and Creative Cause tracking him early. He led down the backstretch with favorite Union Rags right behind and held onto the lead to win by a head. Hansen earned $1,080,000 for the victory and subsequently was voted 2011 American Champion Two-Year-Old Colt.

Hansen began his three-year-old season with the first loss of his career in the Holy Bull Stakes on January 29, 2012. He stumbled out of the gate and then went to the front with an opening fraction of 23.64 and opening half-mile in 45.67. He tired in deep stretch and was passed by Algorithms, ultimately finishing second in front of My Adonis. On March 3, 2011, Hansen won the Grade III Gotham Stakes in a time of 1:43.84.

Hansen's most controversial appearance was in the Blue Grass Stakes, due to pre-race controversy when his eponymous owner dyed the horse's white tail blue as a promotional stunt. Under pressure from the track stewards, who sent security to the barn to seize and test the dye container, his trainer washed out the dye. Hansen placed second in the race behind Dullahan.

On May 5, 2012, Hansen finished 9th in the 2012 Kentucky Derby. Early in the race, he ran in third place before tiring and dropping back. Next racing on June 30, 2012, he won the Iowa Derby. Dominguez flew from Belmont Park to Iowa after a day's riding in New York to guide the colt to his win. On August 4, 2012, Hansen finished fourth in the West Virginia Derby to Macho Macho. While he was preparing for the Travers, a tear in his tendon was discovered.

== Retirement and stud career ==
Hansen was officially retired from racing in September 2012 after his injury and stood at Ashford Stud in for the 2013 breeding season. In October 2013, he was sold to interests in South Korea. On January 28, 2014, Hansen was represented by his first foal, a chestnut colt out of the mare Havelsee, later named Mookie.

On June 5, 2016, gelding Hansen's Victory (owned by North American Thoroughbred Horse Company, Russell Morrison, and Peter Tom) won a maiden special weight at Hastings Racecourse, becoming his sire's first recognized winner.

As of 2017, Hansen's best progeny includes Fast and Accurate, who won the 2017 Spiral Stakes (Hansen's first graded stakes winner), and stakes winners En Hanse and Han Sense. He has also been represented by stakes placed runners Lady Hansen, The Walk, Two Charley's, and Hansenation.

== Pedigree ==
Pedigree of Hansen, gray colt, 2009
| Sire Tapit gr. 2001 | Pulpit dkb/br. 1994 | A.P. Indy dkb/br. 1989 | Seattle Slew |
| Sire Tapit gr. 2001 | Pulpit dkb/br. 1994 | A.P. Indy dkb/br. 1989 | Weekend Surprise |
| Sire Tapit gr. 2001 | Pulpit dkb/br. 1994 | Preach b. 1989 | Mr. Prospector |
| Sire Tapit gr. 2001 | Pulpit dkb/br. 1994 | Preach b. 1989 | Narrate |
| Sire Tapit gr. 2001 | Tap Your Heels gr/r. 1996 | Unbridled b. 1987 | Fappiano |
| Sire Tapit gr. 2001 | Tap Your Heels gr/r. 1996 | Unbridled b. 1987 | Gana Facil |
| Sire Tapit gr. 2001 | Tap Your Heels gr/r. 1996 | Ruby Slippers gr.1982 | Nijinsky II |
| Sire Tapit gr. 2001 | Tap Your Heels gr/r. 1996 | Ruby Slippers gr.1982 | Moon Glitter |
| Dam Stormy Sunday br. 2002 | Sir Cat dkb/br. 1993 | Storm Cat br. 1983 | Storm Bird |
| Dam Stormy Sunday br. 2002 | Sir Cat dkb/br. 1993 | Storm Cat br. 1983 | Terlingua |
| Dam Stormy Sunday br. 2002 | Sir Cat dkb/br. 1993 | Desert Run b. 1989 | Private Account |
| Dam Stormy Sunday br. 2002 | Sir Cat dkb/br. 1993 | Desert Run b. 1989 | April Run |
| Dam Stormy Sunday br. 2002 | Thinkin'strait b. 1992 | Highland Park ch. 1980 | Raise a Native |
| Dam Stormy Sunday br. 2002 | Thinkin'strait b. 1992 | Highland Park ch. 1980 | Old Goat |
| Dam Stormy Sunday br. 2002 | Thinkin'strait b. 1992 | Tescudera b. 1987 | Temperence Hill |
| Dam Stormy Sunday br. 2002 | Thinkin'strait b. 1992 | Tescudera b. 1987 | Thorn Apple |

== Resources ==
- Pedigree & Partial Stats
- Stats & News
