= Iroquois Stakes (Churchill Downs) =

Grade III Thoroughbred horse race

- Class: Grade III
- Location: Churchill Downs; Louisville, Kentucky, United States
- Inaugurated: 1982
- Race type: Thoroughbred – Flat racing
- Website: Churchill Downs

Race information
- Distance: 1 mile
- Surface: Dirt
- Track: left-handed
- Qualification: Two-year-olds
- Weight: 122 lbs with allowances
- Purse: US$300,000 (2021)
- Bonuses: Win and You're In Breeders' Cup Juvenile

The Iroquois Stakes is a Grade III American Thoroughbred horse race for two-year-olds over a distance of one mile on the dirt scheduled annually in September at Churchill Downs in Louisville, Kentucky. The event currently offers a purse of $300,000.

== History ==
The event was inaugurated on 6 November 1982. It was won by the improving Highland Park who was having tenth start of his juvenile career and guided by US Hall of Fame jockey Donald Brumfield by a margin of 6 lengths over the one mile distance in a time of 1:38 1/5.

The event is named for Iroquois, the first American horse to win the English Epsom Derby who in turn was named for the Native American tribe, the Iroquois.

In 199,0 the event was classified as Grade III.

In 2013, the distance for the event was increased to 1 1/16 mile. In 2020 and 2023 the event was decreased back to 1 mile.

The race opens the Road to the Kentucky Derby Prep Season. The winner receives 10 points toward qualifying for the Kentucky Derby.The event is also a "Win and You're In" race in the Breeders' Cup Challenge series.

== Records ==
Speed record

- 1 mile: 1:35.00 – Sittin On Go (2020)
- 1 1/16 miles: 1:43.58 – Dennis' Moment (2019)

Margins

- 8 3/4 lengths – Not This Time (2016)

Most wins by a jockey

- 4 – Pat Day (1985, 1990, 1997, 2002)

Most wins by a trainer

- 4 – William I. Mott (1983, 1990, 1991, 2007)
- 4 – Dale Romans (2013, 2016, 2019, 2020)
- 4 – Steven M. Asmussen (2009, 2010, 2014, 2025)

Most wins by an owner

- 2 – William Lucas (1983, 1990)
- 2 – Claiborne Farm (1985, 1999)
- 2 – Stonestreet Stables (2006, 2010)
- 2 – Albaugh Family Stables (2019, 2020)
- 2 – WinStar Farm (2007, 2021)

== Winners ==
Year	Winner	Jockey	Trainer	Owner	Distance	Time	Purse	Grade	Ref
2026	Salahudin	Jose L. Ortiz	Bob Baffert	Zedan Racing Stables	1 mile	1:36.54	$300,000	III	
2025	Spice Runner	Jose L. Ortiz	Steven M. Asmussen	Winchell Thoroughbreds	1 mile	1:36.59	$299,400	III	
2024	Jonathan's Way	Joel Rosario	Philip Bauer	Rigney Racing	1 mile	1:36.08	$254,745	III	
2023	West Saratoga	Rafael Bejarano	Larry Demeritte	Harry L. Veruchi	1 mile	1:37.28	$300,000	III	
2022	Curly Jack	Edgar Morales	Thomas M. Amoss	Michael McLoughlin	1 1/16 miles	1:45.62	$299,250	III	
2021	Major General	Javier Castellano	Todd Pletcher	WinStar Farm and Siena Farm	1 1/16 miles	1:44.88	$300,000	III	
2020	Sittin On Go	Corey Lanerie	Dale L. Romans	Albaugh Family Stables	1 mile	1:35.00	$200,000	III	
2019	Dennis' Moment	Irad Ortiz Jr.	Dale L. Romans	Albaugh Family Stables	1 1/16 miles	1:43.58	$150,000	III	
2018	Cairo Cat	Brian Hernandez Jr.	Kenneth G. McPeek	Walking L Thoroughbreds	1 1/16 miles	1:45.35	$150,000	III	
2017	The Tabulator	Jose Valdivia Jr.	Larry Rivelli	Carolyn Wilson	1 1/16 miles	1:45.50	$150,000	III	
2016	Not This Time	Robby Albarado	Dale L. Romans	Albaugh Family Stables	1 1/16 miles	1:45.22	$150,000	III	
2015	Cocked and Loaded	Emmanuel Esquivel	Larry Rivelli	Richard Ravin & Patricia's Hope	1 1/16 miles	1:44.94	$150,000	III	
2014	Lucky Player	Ricardo Santana Jr.	Steven M. Asmussen	Jerry Durant	1 1/16 miles	1:45.76	$115,500	III	
2013	Cleburne	Corey J. Lanerie	Dale L. Romans	Donegal Racing	1 1/16 miles	1:45.65	$173,500	III	
2012	Uncaptured	Miguel Mena	Mark E. Casse	John C. Oxley	1 mile	1:37.63	$119,800	III	
2011	Motor City	Calvin H. Borel	Ian R. Wilkes	Lantern Hill Farm	1 mile	1:37.18	$110,700	III	
2010	Astrology	Garrett K. Gomez	Steven M. Asmussen	Stonestreet Stables & George Bolton	1 mile	1:38.43	$122,300	III	
2009	Thiskyhasnolimit	Shaun Bridgmohan	Steven M. Asmussen	Cathy & Bob Zollars & Mark Wagner	1 mile	1:37.36	$120,800	III	
2008	Capt. Candyman Can	Julien R. Leparoux	Ian R. Wilkes	Joseph Rauch & David Zell	1 mile	1:35.16	$111,100	III	
2007	Court Vision	Julien R. Leparoux	William I. Mott	WinStar Farm	1 mile	1:37.26	$171,150	III	
2006	Tiz Wonderful	Garrett K. Gomez	Scott Blasi	Stonestreet Stables	1 mile	1:35.92	$110,900	III	
2005	Catcominatcha	Rafael Bejarano	Eddie Kenneally	Thomas M. McCann	1 mile	1:36.38	$116,700	III	
2004	Straight Line	Brice Blanc	Harvey L. Vanier	Nancy A. Vanier & Cartwright Thoroughbreds	1 mile	1:36.62	$109,600	III	
2003	The Cliff's Edge	Shane Sellers	Nicholas P. Zito	Robert V. LaPenta	1 mile	1:35.57	$113,700	III	
2002	Champali	Pat Day	Gregory D. Foley	Lloyd Madison Farms IV	1 mile	1:37.06	$114,200	III	
2001	Harlan's Holiday	Anthony J. D'Amico	Kenneth G. McPeek	Starlight Stable	1 mile	1:35.01	$113,200	III	
2000	Meetyouathebrig	Gary L. Stevens	W. Elliott Walden	Mansell Stables & James H. Stone	1 mile	1:35.24	$124,300	III	
1999	Mighty	Marlon St. Julien	Frank L. Brothers	Claiborne Farm & Adele B Dilschneider	1 mile	1:35.88	$110,900	III	
1998	Exploit	Chris McCarron	Bob Baffert	Robert & Beverly Lewis	1 mile	1:36.26	$114,700	III	
1997	Keene Dancer	Pat Day	David M. Carroll	Tri County Farm	1 mile	1:37.84	$111,100	III	
1996	Global View	Kenneth Bourque	James O. Keefer	William Heiligbrodt, Ted Keefer & W. (Buddy) New	1 mile	1:36.49	$110,000	III	
1995	Ide	Craig Perret	Peter M. Vestal	Willmott Stables	1 mile	1:36.89	$113,300	III	
1994	Peruvian	José A. Santos	Peter M. Vestal	Dogwood Stable	1 mile	1:36.68	$118,500	III	
1993	Tarzans Blade	Brent E. Bartram	Steven L. Morguelan	Dr. William E. Yancey, William D. Yancey & Tommy Sandefur	1 mile	1:37.00	$117,300	III	
1992	Shoal Creek	Brent E. Bartram	Anthony L. Reinstedler	Loblolly Stable	1 mile	1:37.51	$117,500	III	
1991	Portroe	Mike E. Smith	William I. Mott	Sheikh Mohammed bin Rashid Al Maktoum	1 mile	1:37.96	$117,800	III	
1990	Richman	Pat Day	William I. Mott	William Lucas	1 mile	1:36.60	$56,350	III	
1989	Insurrection	Patrick A. Johnson	Steven C. Penrod	Paul Bryan	1 mile	1:36.80	$57,500		
1988	Dansil	Laffit Pincay Jr.	Frank L. Brothers	John A. Franks	1 mile	1:38.20	$56,150		
1987	Buoy	K. Keith Allen	Joseph M. Bollero	Lois Bollero	1 mile	1:37.80	$51,630		
1986	Icetrain	Mike E. Smith	J. Bert Sonnier	Nelson Bunker Hunt	1 mile	1:40.20	$53,750		
1985	Tile	Pat Day	Steven C. Penrod	Claiborne Farm	1 mile	1:37.20	$54,960		
1984	Banner Bob	K. Keith Allen	Jerome J. Sarner Jr.	Sharon & William J. Walsh	1 mile	1:37.60	$30,000		
1983	Taylor's Special	Don Brumfield	William I. Mott	William Lucas	1 mile	1:37.20	$29,800		
1982	Highland Park	Don Brumfield	Anthony Basile	Bwamazon Farm (Millard Waldheim)	1 mile	1:38.20	$29,375		

== See also ==
- Road to the Kentucky Derby
- List of American and Canadian Graded races
