= Boston Harbor (horse) =

American-bred Thoroughbred racehorse

- Sire: Capote
- Grandsire: Seattle Slew
- Dam: Harbor Springs
- Damsire: Vice Regent
- Sex: Stallion
- Foaled: 4 April 1994
- Died: 9 March 2021 (aged 26)
- Country: United States
- Colour: Bay
- Breeder: Overbrook Farm
- Owner: Overbrook Farm
- Trainer: D. Wayne Lukas
- Record: 8: 6-1-0
- Earnings: $1,934,605

Major wins
- Breeders' Futurity Stakes (1996); Kentucky Cup Juvenile Stakes (1996); Bashford Manor Stakes (1996); Breeders' Cup wins: Breeders' Cup Juvenile (1996)

Awards
- U.S. Champion 2-Yr-Old Colt (1996)
- Last updated on September 5, 2007

Boston Harbor (April 4, 1994 – March 9, 2021) was an American Thoroughbred racehorse. Bred by William T. Young's Overbrook Farm near Lexington, Boston Harbor was a son of Capote who won the 1996 Breeders' Cup Juvenile and was voted that year's U.S. Champion 2-Yr-Old Colt.

Trained by D. Wayne Lukas, Boston Harbor had a spectacular two-year-old season in which he won six times and finished second once in his seven starts. That year, his sweep of four Kentucky stakes races earned the colt an extra million dollars in bonus money. Ridden by future U.S. Racing Hall of Fame jockey, Jerry Bailey, Boston Harbor capped off 1996 with his fourth straight win, capturing the Breeders' Cup Juvenile, run that year at Woodbine Racetrack in Toronto, Ontario, Canada. His performances earned him 1996 U.S. Champion 2-Yr-Old Colt honors and his earnings of $1,928,605 set a new record for juveniles.

Boston Harbor raced only once at age three, finishing off the board. A severe leg injury ended his racing career and he was retired to stud duty at his owner's Overbrook Farm in Kentucky. In the fall of 2001, Boston Harbor was sent to breeders in Japan and is standing at the renowned Shizunai Stallion Station in Hokkaidō. Among Boston Harbor's notable progeny is the millionaire colt, Cafe Bostonian, and the multiple stakes winning millionaire filly, Healthy Addiction. He was also the damsire of Sealy Hill, who in 2007 was voted Canadian Horse of the Year.

== Pedigree ==
Pedigree of Boston Harbor (USA), brown colt, 1994
Sire Capote (USA) 1984	Seattle Slew (USA); 1974	Bold Reasoning (USA)	Boldnesian (USA)
Sire Capote (USA) 1984	Seattle Slew (USA); 1974	Bold Reasoning (USA)	Reason To Earn (USA)
Sire Capote (USA) 1984	Seattle Slew (USA); 1974	My Charmer (USA)	Poker (USA)
Sire Capote (USA) 1984	Seattle Slew (USA); 1974	My Charmer (USA)	Fair Charmer (USA)
Sire Capote (USA) 1984	Too Bald (USA); 1964	Bald Eagle (USA)	Nasrullah (GB)
Sire Capote (USA) 1984	Too Bald (USA); 1964	Bald Eagle (USA)	Siama (USA)
Sire Capote (USA) 1984	Too Bald (USA); 1964	Hidden Talent (USA)	Dark Star (USA)
Sire Capote (USA) 1984	Too Bald (USA); 1964	Hidden Talent (USA)	Dangerous Dame (GB)
Dam Harbor Springs (USA) 1989	Vice Regent (CAN); 1967	Northern Dancer (CAN)	Nearctic (CAN)
Dam Harbor Springs (USA) 1989	Vice Regent (CAN); 1967	Northern Dancer (CAN)	Natalma (USA)
Dam Harbor Springs (USA) 1989	Vice Regent (CAN); 1967	Victoria Regina (CAN)	Menetrier (FRA)
Dam Harbor Springs (USA) 1989	Vice Regent (CAN); 1967	Victoria Regina (CAN)	Victoriana (CAN)
Dam Harbor Springs (USA) 1989	Tinnitus (USA); 1975	Restless Wind (USA)	Windy City (GB)
Dam Harbor Springs (USA) 1989	Tinnitus (USA); 1975	Restless Wind (USA)	Lump Sugar (USA)
Dam Harbor Springs (USA) 1989	Tinnitus (USA); 1975	Dors (USA)	Corporal (GB)
Dam Harbor Springs (USA) 1989	Tinnitus (USA); 1975	Dors (USA)	Cathy (USA)
