= Willie Martinez (jockey) =

Puerto Rican jockey

Personal information
- Born: March 3, 1971 (age 55) Santurce, Puerto Rico
- Occupation: Jockey

Horse racing career
- Sport: Horse racing
- Career wins: 3367+ (ongoing)

Major racing wins
- Gardenia Handicap (1993); Martha Washington Stakes (1993); Louisiana Handicap (1994, 1999); Hopemont Stakes (1995); Black Gold Stakes (1996); Sixty Sails Handicap (1996); Plate Trial Stakes (1997); Regret Stakes (1997); Jenny Wiley Stakes (1997); Illinois Derby (1998); Indian Summer Stakes (1998); Wishing Well Stakes (2001); Debutante Stakes (1998); Ohio Derby (2004); Donn Handicap (2006); New Orleans Handicap (2006); Kentucky Cup Classic Handicap (2006); Greenwood Cup Stakes (2009); Swale Stakes (2012); Bay Shore Stakes (2012); Woody Stephens Stakes (2012) Breeders' Cup Sprint (2012) Canadian Classic Race wins: Prince of Wales Stakes (1997)

Significant horses
- Thirty-Six Red, Cryptocloser; Silverbulletday, Noble’s Promise, Brass Hat, Trinniberg
- Updated on August 26, 2007

Willie Martinez (born March 3, 1971) is a Puerto Rican jockey who competes in thoroughbred horse racing. Martinez is known in the business as "Chillie Willie," because of his "chill" demeanor in riding.

== Background ==
Martinez was born in Santurce, San Juan, Puerto Rico, but moved to the mainland United States in 1988 to work as a hotwalker and groom for his sister's godfather at Finger Lakes Race Track in Farmington, New York.

== Riding career ==
Mrtinez began riding professionally in 1989, and got his first win that year at Tampa Bay Downs. In 1997, at Woodbine Racetrack in Toronto, he rode Cryptocloser to victory in the Prince of Wales Stakes, the second leg of the Canadian Triple Crown series.

During his career, Martinez has won riding titles at: Ellis Park Racecourse, Tampa Bay Downs, Turfway Park, Keeneland Race Course and Hialeah Park. His nine titles at Turfway Park in Florence, Kentucky is more than any other jockey in the track's history. At the same track, he also rode seven winners on July 6, 1993. From 1992 through 2007, Martinez – along with William Henry – held the jockey's record at Tampa Bay Downs for the most wins in a single season with 123 victories to his credit. He also won 36 stakes races at the track, second only to Pat Day as the track's all-time stakes leader. At Ellis Park Martinez rode seven winners on July 6, 1993.

Through March 2022 Martinez had more than 3,500 career wins, purse earnings nearing $83 million, and 150 stakes wins. Among his 38 graded stakes wins are the 2006 New Orleans Handicap (G2) and Donn Handicap (G1) with Brass Hat, and the 2012 Breeders' Cup Sprint with Trinniberg. He also has one Group I win, the 1998 Prince of Wales Stakes. Martinez celebrated a banner day at Turfway Park when he won three of the five Kentucky Cup races in 2006: the Classic (G2) with Ball Four, the Kentucky Cup Distaff Stakes (G3) with Beautiful Bets, and the Juvenile Fillies with Cohiba Miss.

Martinez also partakes in helping bring awareness to the sport regarding issues such as jockey rights. Matters on the constant lapses over health insurance, and weight increase tolerance in the tracks (to just name a few). Martinez alongside other professional riders were interviewed for an HBO documentary Jockey: America Undercover, series back in 2004 for their opinion on the sport and its tolerance in supporting unhealthy lifestyles for jockeys to benefit horses performances during a race.

Martinez is best known as the jockey of Brass Hat which his big break came in 2006. He rode the gelding to victory in several important Graded stakes races, including the Grade 1 Donn Handicap, and on July 8, 2007, broke a 36-year-old track record for 1 1/16 miles at Churchill Downs, stopping the clock at 1:41.27. He also rode Brass Hat to a second-place finish in the Dubai World Cup, although the horse was later disqualified for a medication violation.

On May 1, 2010, Martinez rode Noble's Promise to a 5th-place finish in the Kentucky Derby.

Martinez logged several graded stakes victories aboard Trinniberg in 2012, including the Woody Stephens Stakes, Swale Stakes, and the Breeders' Cup Sprint. Trinniberg went on to win the Eclipse Award for male sprinter that year.

=== Year-end charts ===
Chart (2000–present)	Peak position
National Earnings List for Jockeys 2000	52
National Earnings List for Jockeys 2004	64
National Earnings List for Jockeys 2006	94
