= Jim Morgan (basketball) =

American basketball player (1934–2019)

Personal information
- Born: June 13, 1934 Hyden, Kentucky, U.S.
- Died: September 29, 2019 (aged 85) Dayton, Ohio, U.S.
- Listed height: 6 ft 1 in (1.85 m)
- Listed weight: 175 lb (79 kg)

Career information
- High school: Stivers (Dayton, Ohio)
- College: Louisville (1953–1957)
- NBA draft: 1957: 2nd round, 15th overall pick
- Drafted by: Syracuse Nationals
- Position: Guard
- Coaching career: 1957–1966

Career history

Coaching
- 1957–1966: Stebbins HS

Career highlights
- NIT champion (1956); No. 12 jersey honored by Louisville Cardinals
- Stats at Basketball Reference

James E. Morgan (June 13, 1934 – September 29, 2019) was an American basketball player and race horse trainer. He played college basketball for the Louisville Cardinals and won a National Invitation Tournament (NIT) championship in 1956. Morgan was selected by the Syracuse Nationals in the 1957 NBA draft but never played in the National Basketball Association (NBA). He was a high school teacher and basketball coach in Ohio until he became a horse trainer in the mid-1960s. Morgan was one of Ohio's leading horse trainers over a 40-year career.

== Early life ==
Morgan was born on June 13, 1934, in Hyden, Kentucky, as one of seven children to parents William and Mae Morgan. He spent his early life living with his family in a two-room log cabin that had no electricity or running water until it was burnt down when sparks jumped from a wood fire. During the early 1940s, Morgan and his family moved to Dayton, Ohio, where his father worked at a Delco Electronics factory.

== Basketball career ==
Morgan attended Stivers High School in Dayton and led the team to a No. 1 state ranking in the early 1950s. Morgan opted to play for the Louisville Cardinals over offers from the Kentucky Wildcats and his hometown Dayton Flyers. He scored 1,105 points in four seasons played with the Cardinals. The Cardinals won the 1956 National Invitation Tournament when they defeated the Dayton Flyers.

Morgan was selected by the Syracuse Nationals as the 15th overall pick in the 1957 NBA draft but opted to not sign with the team after they offered him a $5,000 contract. He was a social studies teacher and basketball coach at Stebbins High School in Riverside, Ohio, for nine seasons.

== Race horse training career ==
Morgan resigned from Stebbins in 1966 so he could pursue a longtime dream and became a race horse trainer which he had first become interested in when he worked as an usher at the Churchill Downs racetrack in 1953. Morgan was one of the most successful Thoroughbred trainers in the Midwest and won over 300 stakes races to make him the winningest stakes trainer in Ohio. His horses amassed 1,993 total wins and made earnings of $20.7 million from 1967 to 2008. Morgan served as president of the Ohio Horsemen's Benevolent and Protective Association, and a trustee in the Thoroughbred's Horsemen's Health Fund from 1998 until his death.

Selected significant Stakes Race wins
Significant stakes wins:

- Fayette Stakes (1974)
- Tejano Run Stakes (1975)
- Golden Rod Stakes (1977)
- Dogwood Stakes (1978)
- Mint Julep Stakes (1979)
- Lafayette Stakes (1980)

== Honors ==
Morgan was inducted into the Louisville Cardinals Athletics Hall of Fame in 1981, the Stivers Athletic Hall of Fame in 2006, and the Ohio Basketball Hall of Fame in 2013. He had his No. 12 jersey honored by the Louisville Cardinals and it hangs in the rafters of Freedom Hall.

== Personal life ==
Morgan had two children. Two of his brothers were collegiate athletes at Morehead State University: Mickey on the basketball team and Tom on the football team.

Morgan survived a serious heart attack in 1993 and continued working despite being recommended to retire by a doctor.

Morgan died at the age of 85 from a suspected heart attack in Dayton on September 29, 2019. He was buried in his family's plot at Deerfield Cemetery in South Lebanon, Ohio.
