= Tejano Run Stakes =

- Class: Listed
- Location: Turfway Park; Florence, Kentucky, United States
- Inaugurated: 1974
- Race type: Thoroughbred - Flat racing
- Website: www.turfway.com

Race information
- Distance: 1 1/8 miles (9 furlongs)
- Surface: Polytrack synthetic dirt
- Track: left-handed
- Qualification: Four-years-old & up
- Weight: Assigned
- Purse: $50,000

The Tejano Run Stakes is an American ungraded Thoroughbred horse race held annually at Turfway Park in Florence, Kentucky. Open to horses age four and older, it is contested on Polytrack synthetic dirt over a distance of one and one eighth miles (8 furlongs).

Inaugurated in 1974 as the Pioneer Stakes, the race was renamed in 1997 to honor Tejano Run who won the 1996 Pioneer Stakes as well as other important stakes at Turfway Park.

There was no race run in 1990 and 2009.

Distances:

- 1 mile : 1983–1988
- 1 1/8 miles : 1974–1982, 1989–present

== Records ==
Speed record: (at current distance of 1 1/8 miles)

- 1:45.00 - London Fog (1978) & Savage Moon (1979)

Most wins

- 2 - Tribute to Royalty (1986, 1988)
- 2 - Danville (1995, 1998)
- 2 - Glacial (1999, 2001)

Most wins by a jockey

- 3 - Michael McDowell (1979, 1986, 1988)
- 3 - James Bruin (1987, 1992, 1994)

Most wins by a trainer

- 3 - Bernard S. Flint (2002, 2004, 2005)

Most wins by an owner

- 2 - John E. Churchman, Jr. (1986, 1988)
- 2 - Top of the Key Stable (1995, 1998)
- 2 - Kingfish Stable (1999, 2001)
- 2 - LTB Inc. & R. A. Williams (2004, 2005)

== Winners ==
Year	Winner	Age	Jockey	Trainer	Owner	Time
2011	Baryshnikov	5	Thomas L. Pompell	Mike Maker	Columbro & Apostelos	1:51.92
2009	no race					
2008	High Blues	5	James Lopez	George R. Arnold II	Dixiana Stables	1:51.71
2007	Jade's Revenge	4	Rodney Prescott	H. Graham Motion	Bushwood Stables LLC	1:50.11
2006	Ball Four	5	Julien Leparoux	Patrick Biancone	Derrick Smith & Michael Tabor	1:51.97
2005	Discreet Hero	7	Justin Vitek	Bernard S. Flint	LTB Inc. & R. A. Williams	1:49.50
2004	Ask the Lord	7	Rafael Bejarano	Bernard S. Flint	LTB Inc. & R. A. Williams	1:49.82
2003	Mail Call	5	Rafael Bejarano	Gary Montgomery	Sarah & Glenn Montgomery	1:51.06
2002	Double Affair	8	Jeff Johnston	Bernard S. Flint	Ed Wright & Miles Childers	1:50.60
2001	Glacial	6	Brian Peck	Daniel M. Smithwick, Jr.	Kingfish Stable	1:50.20
2000	Irish Silence	6	Terry Thompson	K. Lewis	James F. Turner	1:50.60
1999	Glacial	4	Jesse Campbell	Daniel M. Smithwick, Jr.	Kingfish Stable	1:49.60
1998	Danville	7	Francisco Torres	William G. Huffman	Top of the Key Stable	1:49.00
1997	Grand Teton	4	Fabio Arguello, Jr.	Katherine K. Ball	Donamire Farm	1:49.80
1996	Tejano Run	4	Terry Thompson	Kenneth McPeek	Roy & Joyce Monroe	1:50.40
1995	Danville	4	Larry Melancon	William G. Huffman	Top of the Key Stable	1:52.00
1994	Secreto's Hideaway	5	James Bruin	Akiko Gothard	Mickey Liber	1:49.60
1993	Bolt the Hatch	6	Brent Bartram	Niall O'Callaghan	Budget Stable	1:52.40
1992	Profit Key	5	James Bruin	D. Wayne Lukas	H. J. Allen & D. L. Mathis	1:51.20
1991	Cool Corbett	6	Patricia Cooksey	John C. Goodwin	B. Lunsford & L. Holbrook	1:51.00
1990	no race					
1989	Cub Scout	6	Charles Woods, Jr.	John C. Goodwin	John C. Goodwin	1:47.40
1988	Tribute to Royalty	7	Michael McDowell	John E. Churchman, Jr.	John E. Churchman, Jr.	1:36.20
1987	Quick Speed	5	James Bruin	Earl C. Murphy	William L. Johnson	1:39.80
1986	Tribute to Royalty	5	Michael McDowell	John E. Churchman, Jr.	John E. Churchman, Jr.	1:37.00
1985	Exclusive Greer	4	Scott Miller	Michael J. Tackett	M. J. & E. J. Tackett	1:38.80
1984	Shape Up	nf	Jose Calo	Ernest D. Flynn	Est. of Mrs. Frazier Lebus	1:37.80
1983	Prince Fortune	5	Steve Neff	Larry Roe	D. W. Jones	1:35.80
1982	Timeless Statue	5	Eugene Sipus, Jr.	Roy Frazier	R. C. Durr	1:47.60
1981	Vanders Force	nf	Darrell Foster	Hulon L. Womack	Carolyn Cline & D. Cline	1:47.40
1980	One Lucky Devil	6	David Niblick	Jeffrey Sheets	Rapid Stable	1:46.80
1979	Savage Moon	6	Michael McDowell	Edgar Gordon	Gordon & Schmidt	1:45.00
1978	London Fog	4	Charles Woods, Jr.	Elizabeth Mangione	Joseph B. Mangione	1:45.00
1977	Satan's Cheer	5	Mike Manganello	Peter W. Salmen, Jr.	Crimson King Farm	1:48.40
1976	Brustigert	6	M. Bryant	Pat B. Deveraux	T. F. Deveraux	1:46.60
1975	Jesta Dream Away	5	Guilermo Milord	James E. Morgan	Zweisler & Zimmerman	1:46.00
1974	Ill Will	3	Julio Espinoza	Richard E. Vance	J. Bullock	1:46.80
