= Holiday Inaugural Stakes =

American thoroughbred horse racer

- Class: Listed stakes
- Location: Turfway Park; Florence, Kentucky, United States
- Race type: Thoroughbred - Flat racing

Race information
- Distance: 1 and 1/16 Miles
- Surface: Dirt
- Track: left-handed
- Qualification: Three Year Olds and up
- Weight: 124 lbs
- Purse: $75,000 (2019)

The Holiday Inaugural Stakes is an American Thoroughbred horse race held annually in late November or early December at Turfway Park in Florence, Kentucky. It is a Listed race. The race has been run for over 30 years.

== Recent winners ==
| Year | Winner | Jockey | Trainer | Owner | Time |
|---|---|---|---|---|---|
| 2019 | Jean Elizabeth | Albin Jimenez | Larry Rivelli | Ravin, Richard, Patricia's Hope LLC and Rivelli, Larry | 1:09.39 |
| 2018 | Goldberry | Rogelio Miranda | Marco Castaneda | Karen Schaeffer | 1:09.92 |
| 2017 | Luckyallmylife | Perry Ouzts | Robert Gorham | Mast Thoroughbreds LLC | 1:09.85 |
| 2016 | Marquee Miss | Didiel Osorio | Ingrid Mason | Joe Ragsdale | 1:09.10 |
| 2015 | Spanish Pipedream | Albin Jimenez | Wesley Ward | Hat Creek Racing | 1:11.01 |

== Past winners ==
- 2014 - In a Jif
- 2013 - Dreamin Big
- 2012 - Slim Shady's Lady
- 2011 - Fortune Play
- 2010 - Perfect for You
- 2009 - Coy Cat
- 2008 - Afleet Angel
- 2007 - Fast Deal
- 2006 - Tax Refund
- 2005 - Hot Storm
- 2004 - Revolutionary Act
- 2003 - Halory Leigh
- 2002 - Emily Ring
- 2001 - Spanish Glitter
- 2000 - Miss Steffins
- 1999 - Bourbon Belle
- 1998 - Freddie Frisson
- 1997 - Lady Tabnita
- 1996 - Morris Code
- 1995 - Cat Appeal
- 1994 - Caznire
- 1993 - Meryl's Myth
- 1992 - Luv Me Luv Me Not
- 1991 - Hoga
- 1990 - Nurse Dopey
- 1989 - Pat Copelan
- 1988 - Cordialine
- 1987 - Sheena Native
- 1986 - Special Power
