= Kelly J. Breen =

American horse trainer

Kelly Breen
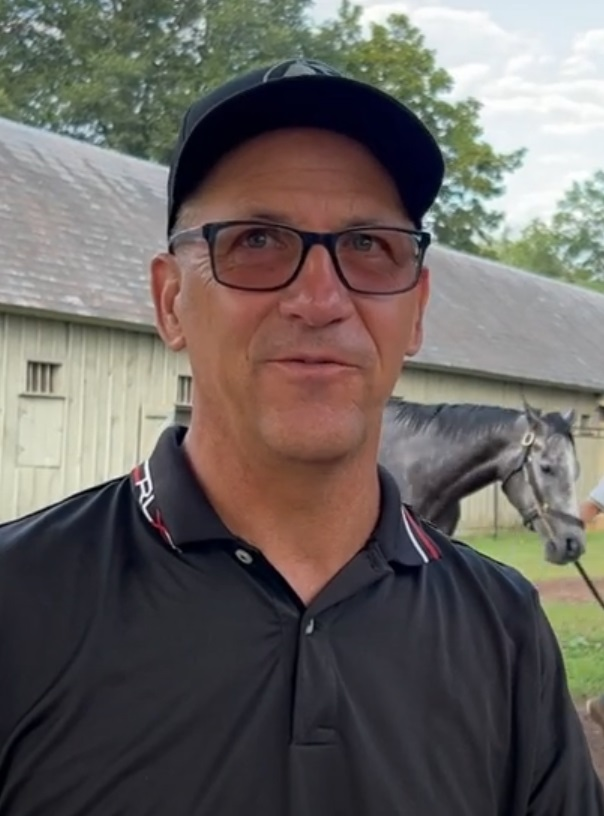
- Breen in 2022

Personal information
- Born: May 13, 1969 (age 57) Perth Amboy, New Jersey
- Occupation: Trainer

Horse racing career
- Sport: Horse racing
- Career wins: 940+ (ongoing)

Major racing wins
- Pilgrim Stakes (2005); Sorority Stakes (2005, 2009); Kentucky Cup Juvenile Stakes (2008); Lamplighter Stakes (2009); Endine Stakes (2009); Forward Gal Stakes (2010); Louisiana Derby (2011); Pegasus Stakes (2011); Prioress Stakes (2014); Regret Stakes (2016); Tempted Stakes (2016); Davona Dale Stakes (2017); Kentucky Cup Juvenile Stakes (2018); American Classic Race wins: Belmont Stakes (2011)

Significant horses
- Ruler on Ice, Pants On Fire

Kelly John Breen (born May 13, 1969, in Perth Amboy, New Jersey) is a trainer of thoroughbred racehorses. Born in Perth Amboy, New Jersey, Breen has been a resident of Howell, New Jersey and Boynton Beach, FL.

As a New Jersey native, he operated a small stable from 1992 to 1994. He then worked as an assistant to Ben Perkins before taking over as the personal trainer at Monmouth Park in 2003. By 2006, he was training horses exclusively for George and Lori Hall.

On June 11, 2011, Breen won the most important race of his career when Ruler on Ice won the third leg of the U.S. Triple Crown series, the Belmont Stakes.

Breen no longer trains privately for the Halls, and has won several graded stakes including those with Bern Identity, Black Onyx, Stonetastic and Calamity Kate.
