= Iowa Derby =

- Class: Listed
- Location: Prairie Meadows Racetrack; Altoona, Iowa, United States
- Inaugurated: 1989
- Race type: Thoroughbred - Flat racing
- Website: www.prairiemeadows.com

Race information
- Distance: 1 1/16 miles (8.5 furlongs)
- Surface: Dirt
- Track: left-handed
- Qualification: Three-years-old
- Weight: Assigned
- Purse: $250,000 (2018)

The Iowa Derby is a Listed American Thoroughbred horse race for three-year-olds run over a distance of 1 1/16 miles (8.5 furlongs) on the dirt annually at Prairie Meadows Racetrack in Altoona, Iowa. The purse of the event is US$250,000.

== Race History ==
The race was first run in 1989 as an ungraded stakes race. It became a Grade III event in 2010 and lowered back to Listed in 2018.

== Records ==
Speed record:

- 1:40.37 - Concord Point (2010)

Margins:

- 10 lengths - Hansen (2012)

Most wins by a trainer:

- 5 - Steven M. Asmussen (2002, 2006, 2017, 2023, 2025)

Most wins by a jockey:

- 3 - Rafael Bejarano (2011, 2016, 2024)

Most wins by an owner:

- No owner has won this race more than once

== Winners ==
| Year | Winner | Jockey | Trainer | Owner | Time |
|---|---|---|---|---|---|
| 2026 | J J Grey | Emmanuel Esquivel | Kenneth G. McPeek | Shamrock Stables, MJM Racing & Magdalena Racing | 1:43.17 |
| 2025 | Magnitude | Ben Curtis | Steven M. Asmussen | Winchell Thoroughbreds | 1:42.26 |
| 2024 | Henro | Rafael Bejarano | Chris A. Hartman | JD Thoroughbreds LLC & Joey Keith Davis | 1:42.72 |
| 2023 ^{2} | How Did He Do That | Richard Eramia | Steven M. Asmussen | J. Kirk & Judy Robison | 1:43.57 |
| 2022 | Ain’t Life Grand | Elvin Gonzalez | Kelly R. Von Hemel | RPM Thoroughbreds | 1:42.65 |
| 2021 | Stilleto Boy | José Ortiz | Doug L. Anderson | Steve Moger | 1:42.64 |
| 2020 ^{1} | Acre | Martin Garcia | William I. Mott | Claiborne Farm & Adele Dilschneider | 1:42.74 |
| 2019 | Top Line Growth | Julian Pimentel | Kelly Rubley | The Elkstone Group, LLC | 1:43.07 |
| 2018 | High North | Florent Geroux | Brad H. Cox | Shortleaf Stable, Inc. | 1:44.35 |
| 2017 | Hence | Mike Smith | Steven M. Asmussen | Calumet Farm | 1:42.84 |
| 2016 | American Freedom | Rafael Bejarano | Bob Baffert | Mary & Gary West | 1:42.62 |
| 2015 | Bent on Bourbon | Javier Castellano | Eddie Kenneally | Bourbon Lane Stable | 1:44.00 |
| 2014 | Jessica's Star | David Mello | Michael Stidham | Mark D. Breen | 1:44.12 |
| 2013 | Looking Cool | Leandro R. Goncalves | Carl A. Nafzger | Jim Tafel | 1:44.29 |
| 2012 | Hansen | Ramon Dominguez | Mike Maker | Dr. Hansen & Skychai Racing | 1:42.01 |
| 2011 | Prayer for Relief | Rafael Bejarano | Bob Baffert | Zayat Stables | 1:41.73 |
| 2010 | Concord Point | Martin Garcia | Bob Baffert | Kaleem Shah | 1:40.37 |
| 2009 | Duke of Mischief | Eibar Coa | David Fawkes | Joann & Alex Lieblong, et al. | 1:42.26 |
| 2008 | Tiz Now Tiz Then | Miguel Mena | Eoin G. Harty | Zabeel Racing | 1:41.69 |
| 2007 | Delightful Kiss | Jeffrey Sanchez | Pete D. Anderson | Hobeau Farm | 1:42.05 |
| 2006 | More Than Regal | Shaun Bridgmohan | Steven M. Asmussen | Vinery Stables | 1:42.74 |
| 2005 | Shamoan | Jose Valdivia, Jr. | Eoin G. Harty | P. R. & Linda Laird | 1:43.14 |
| 2004 | Swingforthefences | Shaun Bridgmohan | Richard Violette, Jr. | Klaravich Stables | 1:43.31 |
| 2003 | Excessivepleasure | Jon Court | Douglas F. O'Neill | Ty & Leroy Leatherman | 1:40.82 |
| 2002 | Easyfromthegitgo | Donnie Meche | Steven M. Asmussen | James Cassels & Bob Zollars | 1:42.59 |
| 2001 | Touch Tone | Robby Albarado | Ronny Werner | Tom R. Durant | 1:42.67 |
| 2000 | Captain Steve | Shane Sellers | Bob Baffert | Michael E. Pegram | 1:42.35 |
| 1999 | Grits'n Hard Toast | Willie Martinez | Thomas V. Smith | Thomas Victor Smith & R. A. Anderson | 1:42.89 |
| 1998 | Swear By Dixie | Sidney P. LeJeune Jr | Walter M. Bindner Jr. | Donald G. McClinton | 1:47.39 |
| 1997 | Crafty One | Sidney P. LeJeune Jr | Kenneth G. McPeek | Roy K. & Joyce Monroe | 1:43.43 |
| 1996 | Raja's Omega | M. Clifton Berry | Clinton C. Stuart | Jack & Jim Schuyler | 1:43.03 |
| 1995 | Prince Ariba | Perry S. Whetstone | Larry E. Hunt, Sr. | Hunt Country Stables | 1:44.60 |
| 1989 | Thelastproudperson | Wilson L. Brown | David Wilder Essman | Locke Neal | 1:41.64 |

Notes:
^{1} In 2020, Letmeno finished first but was disqualified due to interference and placed second.
^{2} In 2023, One in Vermillion finished in a dead heat for first with How Did He Do That. One in Vermillion was disqualified for interference and placed second.
