= Prairie Bayou Stakes =

American thoroughbred horse race

- Class: Listed stakes
- Location: Turfway Park; Florence, Kentucky, United States
- Race type: Thoroughbred - Flat racing

Race information
- Distance: 1 and 1/16 Miles
- Surface: Dirt
- Track: left-handed
- Qualification: Three Year Olds and up
- Weight: 124 lbs
- Purse: $75,000 (2019)

The Prairie Bayou Stakes is an American Thoroughbred horse race held annually in December at Turfway Park in Florence, Kentucky. It is a Listed race.

== Recent winners ==
Year	Winner	Jockey	Trainer	Owner	Time
2019	Peekacho	John McKee	Brian Michael	Andrew C. Ritter	1:45.49
2018	Nun the Less	Walter De La Cruz	Cipriano Contreras	Crystal Racing Enterprises & Contreras Stable Inc.	1:42.54
2017	Royal Son	Dean Sarvis	Kellyn Gorder	Sweet Home Stables & Mark Parkinson	1:44.04
2016	Dac	Rodney Prescott	W. Scott Brumley	Sarinana Racing LLC	1:42.76
2015	Dac	Rodney Prescott	W. Scott Brumley	Amanda Sarinana & Jose C. Sarinana	1:45.38

== Past winners ==
- 2014 - Heuston (IRE)
- 2013 - Cyber Secret
- 2012 - Night Party
- 2011 - Proceed Bee
- 2010 - Timeless Fashion
- 2009 - Timeless Fashion
- 2008 - Canela
- 2007 - Kettle Hill
- 2006 - Sidcup
- 2005 - Brass Hat
- 2004 - Discreet Hero
- 2003 - Ask the Lord
- 2002 - Horrible Evening
- 2001 - Crafty Shaw
- 2000 - Glacial
- 1999 - Not run
- 1998 - Plundering
- 1997 - Rod and Staff
- 1996 - Come on Get Happy
- 1995 - Judge T C
