= Rhetorical (horse) =

American racehorse

- Sire: Not This Time
- Grandsire: Giant's Causeway
- Dam: Sheet Humor
- Damsire: Distorted Humor
- Sex: Gelding
- Foaled: March 3, 2021 (age 5)
- Country: United States
- Colour: Dark Bay, Brown
- Breeder: Mallory Mort & Karen Mort
- Owner: Barber, Gary, Cheyenne Stable, LLC and Wachtel Stable
- Trainer: William Walden
- Record: 12: 7 - 0 - 2
- Earnings: US$2,508,480

Major wins
- Coolmore Turf Mile Stakes (2025, 2026); Turf Classic Stakes (2026)

Rhetorical (USA) (foaled 3 March 2021) is an active American-bred thoroughbred racehorse. Known for winning back-to-back Coolmore Turf Mile Stakes and 2026 Turf Classic Stakes.

== Background ==
Rhetorical is a Gelding owned by Barber, Gary, Cheyenne Stable, LLC and Wachtel Stable. Ridden by Irad Ortiz Jr. and trained by William Walden. He was sired by the stallion Not This Time out of the dam Sheet Humor.

== Racing Careers ==
=== 2024 three-year-old season ===
Rhetorical won his career debut at Saratoga Racetrack on 26 July by 5 lengths. He then race an Allowance race at Saratoga Racetrack on 24 August as his final race in 2024 finished third.

=== 2025 four-year-old season ===
Rhetorical first race in 2025 was an Allowance on 18 May at Aqueduct Racetrack, won the race by 5 lengths. He then won again on 19 July at Saratoga Racetrack. On 25 August at Saratoga, Rhetorical entered and won his first stakes race the West Point Stakes.

On 4 October, Rhetorical then stepped up and entered the Gr.1 Coolmore Turf Mile Stakes at Keeneland racetrack, ridden by Irad Ortiz Jr. After the gate opened, he was settled fourth on the inside, on final turn he then moved to outside and at the home straight chased the leader Quatrocento, he passed the leader on the final furlong and hold the led from the incoming Program Trading, won his first Gr.1 race. The race was part of the Breeder's Cup "Win and You’re In". Rhetorical then start his last race on the season at the Breeders' Cup Mile on 1 November, after earned the "Win and You’re In", but finished in fourth to the winner Godolphin horse Notable Speech.

=== 2026 five-year-old season ===
Rhetorical start his 2026 entered the Gr.1 Maker's Mark Mile Stakes on 10 April at Keeneland racetrack. He was positioned in middle pack most of the time, he then took second place from Aomori City at home straight and chased the leader Zulu Kingdom, however the leader already lengthening his led, less than 100m One Stripe took the second place and Rhetorical finished third.

On 2 May, Rhetorical entered the Gr.1 Old Forester Turf Classic. After gate opened, he moved to the front and led the race, on the home straight he then lengthening his led until finish post and won the race by 3 1/4 lengths from gate-to-wire.

== Racing Statistics ==
Date	Distance	Race	Grade	Track	Field	Finish	Winning Time (Note: Official time of winning horse. The time written in Italics doesn't belong to Rhetorical.)	Winning (Losing) Horse	Jockey	Ref
2024 three-year-old season
Jul 26	1 miles	Maiden Special Weight		Saratoga	10	1st	1:35.85	(Sebastianthe First)	Irad Ortiz Jr.	
24 Aug	1 1/16 miles	Allowance		Saratoga	11	3rd	1:42.94	Clear Conscience	Irad Ortiz Jr.	
2025 four-year-old season
18 May	1 1/16 miles	Allowance		Aqueduct	11	1st	1:41.13	(Fidelightcayut)	Irad Ortiz Jr.	
19 Jul	1 1/16 miles	Allowance Optional Claiming		Saratoga	6	1st	1:41.41	(Activist Investing)	Manuel Franco	
24 Aug	1 1/16 miles	West Point Stakes	BT	Saratoga	6	1st	1:39.71	(Bettrluckythangood)	Irad Ortiz Jr.	
04 Oct	1 miles	Coolmore Turf Mile Stakes	G1	Keeneland	11	1st	1:33.61	(Program Trading)	Irad Ortiz Jr.	
01 Nov	1 miles	Breeders' Cup Mile	G1	Del Mar	13	4th	1:33.66	Notable Speech	Irad Ortiz Jr.	
2026 five-year-old season
10 Apr	1 miles	Maker's Mark Mile Stakes	G1	Keeneland	7	3rd	1:34.90	Zulu Kingdom	Irad Ortiz Jr.	
02 May	1 1/8 miles	Turf Classic Stakes	G1	Churchill Downs	9	1st	1:45.96	(Make Me King)	Irad Ortiz Jr.	
06 Jun	1 3/16 miles	Manhattan Stakes	G1	Saratoga	9	4th	1:50.50	Deterministic	Irad Ortiz Jr.	
08 Aug	1 miles	Fourstardave Stakes	G1	Saratoga	6	4th	1:35.07	Deterministic	Manuel Franco	
03 Oct	1 miles	Coolmore Turf Mile Stakes	G1	Keeneland	11	1st	1:36.35	(Lake Forest)	Irad Ortiz Jr.	

== Pedigree ==
Pedigree of Rhetorical (USA), dark bay / brown gelding 2021
Sire Not This Time (USA) 2014	Giants Causeway (USA); 1997	Storm Cat	Storm Bird
Sire Not This Time (USA) 2014	Giants Causeway (USA); 1997	Storm Cat	Terlingua
Sire Not This Time (USA) 2014	Giants Causeway (USA); 1997	Mariah's Storm	Rahy
Sire Not This Time (USA) 2014	Giants Causeway (USA); 1997	Mariah's Storm	Immense
Sire Not This Time (USA) 2014	Miss Macy Sue (USA); 1993	Trippi	End Sweep
Sire Not This Time (USA) 2014	Miss Macy Sue (USA); 1993	Trippi	Jealous Appeal
Sire Not This Time (USA) 2014	Miss Macy Sue (USA); 1993	Yada Yada	Great Above
Sire Not This Time (USA) 2014	Miss Macy Sue (USA); 1993	Yada Yada	Stem
Dam Sheet Humor (USA) 2011	Distorted Humor; 1993	Forty Niner	Mr. Prospector
Dam Sheet Humor (USA) 2011	Distorted Humor; 1993	Forty Niner	File
Dam Sheet Humor (USA) 2011	Distorted Humor; 1993	Danzigs Beauty	Danzig
Dam Sheet Humor (USA) 2011	Distorted Humor; 1993	Danzigs Beauty	Sweetest Chant
Dam Sheet Humor (USA) 2011	Sheets; 2004	Scatmandu	Storm Cat
Dam Sheet Humor (USA) 2011	Sheets; 2004	Scatmandu	Princess Alydar
Dam Sheet Humor (USA) 2011	Sheets; 2004	One Hot Minute	Relaunch
Dam Sheet Humor (USA) 2011	Sheets; 2004	One Hot Minute	Hot Love (Family: 23-b)
