= Coolmore Turf Mile Stakes =

American thoroughbred horse race

- Class: Grade I
- Location: Keeneland Race Course; Lexington, Kentucky, United States
- Inaugurated: 1986 (as Keeneland Breeders' Cup Stakes)
- Race type: Thoroughbred – Flat racing
- Sponsor: Coolmore (2022)
- Website: Keeneland

Race information
- Distance: 1 mile
- Surface: Turf
- Track: Left-handed
- Qualification: Three-year-olds and older
- Weight: Weight-for-age; 4-year-olds and up: 126 lbs. 3-year-olds: 122 lbs Fillies & mares allowed 3 lbs.
- Purse: $1,250,000 (2024)
- Bonuses: Win and You're In Breeders' Cup Mile

The Coolmore Turf Mile Stakes is a Grade I American thoroughbred horse race for three year olds and older over a distance of one mile on the turf held annually in October at Keeneland Race Course in Lexington, Kentucky during the fall meeting.

== History ==
The inaugural running of the event was on 11 October 1986 as the Keeneland Breeders' Cup Stakes at a distance of 1 1/8 miles with added purse incentive for horses that were entered to the Breeders' Cup. The event was won by the 21-1 Ohio bred longshot Leprechauns Wish in a time of 1:51 4/5.

The added purses from the Breeders' Cup high quality participants and the race was classified as Grade III in 1988. The winner of the fourth running in 1989, the British bred Steinlen in his next start won the Breeders' Cup Mile at Gulfstream Park.

In 1994 the distance of the event was decreased to one mile.

In 1998 the event was upgraded to Grade II and in 2001 to Grade I.

In 1999 Shadwell Farm became the sponsor of the event, and in 2004 the event was renamed to the Shadwell Turf Mile Stakes. Shadwell's sponsorship lasted until 2020. After the race's name reverted to the Keeneland Turf Mile Stakes for 2021, it was announced that John Magnier's Coolmore Stud would become the title sponsor. The Coolmore Turf Mile will carried a $1 million purse for its 2022 running and was increased to $1,250,000 in 2024.

The event continues to be part of the Breeders' Cup Challenge series with the winner automatically qualifying for the Breeders' Cup Mile.

== Records ==
Time record:

- 1 mile: 1:33.72 – Annapolis (2022)
- 1 1/8 miles: 1:48.36 – Lotus Pool (1992)

Margins

- 4 1/2 lengths – Nothing to Lose (2004)

Most wins

- 2 – Dumaani (1995, 1996)
- 2 – Gio Ponti (2010, 2011)
- 2 – Wise Dan (2012, 2014)
- 2 – Rhetorical (2025, 2026)

Most wins by an owner

- 3 – Rick Nichols, lessee from Shadwell Racing (1995, 1996, 2000)

Most wins by a jockey

- 4 – Robby Albarado (2004, 2008, 2009, 2013)

Most wins by a trainer

- 3 – Kiaran McLaughlin (1995, 1996, 2000)

== Winners ==
| Year | Winner | Age | Jockey | Trainer | Owner | Distance | Time | Purse | Grade | Ref |
|---|---|---|---|---|---|---|---|---|---|---|
Coolmore Turf Mile Stakes
| 2026 | Rhetorical | 5 | Irad Ortiz Jr. | William Walden | Gary Barber, Cheyenne Stable & Wachtel Stable | 1 mile | 1:36.35 | $1,250,000 | I | |
| 2025 | Rhetorical | 4 | Irad Ortiz Jr. | William Walden | Gary Barber, Cheyenne Stable & Wachtel Stable | 1 mile | 1:33.61 | $1,038,750 | I | |
| 2024 | Carl Spackler (IRE) | 4 | Tyler Gaffalione | Chad C. Brown | e Five Racing Thoroughbreds | 1 mile | 1:34.23 | $1,065,625 | I | |
| 2023 | Up to the Mark | 4 | Jose Ortiz | Todd A. Pletcher | Repole Stable & St. Elias Stable | 1 mile | 1:34.18 | $1,000,000 | I | |
| 2022 | Annapolis | 3 | Irad Ortiz Jr. | Todd A. Pletcher | Bass Racing | 1 mile | 1:33.29 | $1,000,000 | I | |
Keeneland Turf Mile Stakes
| 2021 | In Love (BRZ) | 5 | Alex Achard | Paulo Lobo | Bonne Chance Farm & Stud R D I | 1 mile | 1:34.84 | $750,000 | I | |
Shadwell Turf Mile Stakes
| 2020 | Ivar (BRZ) | 4 | Joseph Talamo | Paulo Lobo | Bonne Chance Farm & Stud R D I | 1 mile | 1:33.99 | $750,000 | I | |
| 2019 | Bowies Hero | 5 | Flavien Prat | Philip D'Amato | Agave Racing Stable, ERJ Racing & Madaket Stables | 1 mile | 1:34.20 | $1,000,000 | I | |
| 2018 | Next Shares | 5 | Tyler Gaffalione | Richard Baltas | Michael & Jules Iavarone, Jerry McClanahan, Christopher T. Dunn, William Marasa, Richie Robershaw, Mark Taylor | 1 mile | 1:36.97 | $1,000,000 | I | |
| 2017 | Suedois (FR) | 6 | Daniel Alexander Tudhope | David O'Meara | George Turner & Clipper Logistics | 1 mile | 1:35.94 | $1,000,000 | I | |
| 2016 | ƒ Miss Temple City | 4 | Edgar S. Prado | H. Graham Motion | The Club Racing, Needle In A Haystack & Sagamore Farm | 1 mile | 1:37.04 | $1,000,000 | I | |
| 2015 | Grand Arch | 6 | Luis Saez | Brian A. Lynch | Susan & Jim Hill | 1 mile | 1:37.45 | $1,000,000 | I | |
| 2014 | Wise Dan | 7 | John R. Velazquez | Charles LoPresti | Morton Fink | 1 mile | 1:35.62 | $1,000,000 | I | |
| 2013 | Silver Max | 4 | Robby Albarado | Dale L. Romans | Mark Bacon & Dana Wells | 1 1/16 miles | 1:42.06 | $750,000 | I | |
| 2012 | Wise Dan | 5 | Jose Lezcano | Charles LoPresti | Morton Fink | 1 mile | 1:34.94 | $750,000 | I | |
| 2011 | Gio Ponti | 6 | Ramon A. Dominguez | Christophe Clement | Castleton Lyons | 1 mile | 1:34.17 | $600,000 | I | |
| 2010 | Gio Ponti | 5 | Ramon A. Dominguez | Christophe Clement | Castleton Lyons | 1 mile | 1:35.06 | $600,000 | I | |
| 2009 | Court Vision | 4 | Robby Albarado | Richard E. Dutrow Jr. | IEAH Stables & Resolute Group Stables | 1 mile | 1:38.68 | $600,000 | I | |
| 2008 | Thorn Song | 5 | Robby Albarado | Dale L. Romans | Zayat Stables | 1 mile | 1:34.97 | $600,000 | I | |
| 2007 | Purim | 5 | Jamie Theriot | Thomas F. Proctor | Edward J. Sukley | 1 mile | 1:35.56 | $648,000 | I | |
| 2006 | Aussie Rules | 3 | Garrett K. Gomez | Aidan P. O'Brien | Mrs. John Magnier, Michael Tabor & Faisal Salman | 1 mile | 1:34.23 | $600,000 | I | |
| 2005 | Host (CHI) | 5 | Rafael Bejarano | Todd A. Pletcher | Melnyk Racing | 1 mile | 1:37.67 | $600,000 | I | |
| 2004 | Nothing to Lose | 4 | Robby Albarado | Robert J. Frankel | Kenneth & Sarah Ramsey | 1 mile | 1:35.55 | $600,000 | I | |
Keeneland Turf Mile Stakes
| 2003 | Perfect Soul (IRE) | 5 | Edgar S. Prado | Roger L. Attfield | Charles E. Fipke | 1 mile | 1:36.01 | $600,000 | I | |
| 2002 | Landseer (GB) | 3 | Edgar S. Prado | Aidan P. O'Brien | Mrs. John Magnier & Michael Tabor | 1 mile | 1:35.55 | $600,000 | I | |
| 2001 | Hap | 5 | Jerry D. Bailey | William I. Mott | Allen E. Paulson Trust | 1 mile | 1:35.98 | $558,500 | II | |
| 2000 | Altibr | 5 | Richard Migliore | Kiaran P. McLaughlin | Shadwell Farm (Rick Nichols Lessee) | 1 mile | 1:33.72 | $451,200 | II | |
| 1999 | Kirkwall (GB) | 5 | Victor Espinoza | Robert J. Frankel | Juddmonte Farms | 1 mile | 1:37.96 | $453,600 | II | |
Keeneland Breeders' Cup Mile Stakes
| 1998 | Favorite Trick | 3 | Pat Day | William I. Mott | Joseph LaCombe Stable | 1 mile | 1:35.00 | $272,250 | II | |
| 1997 | Wild Event | 4 | Mark Guidry | Louis M. Goldfine | Arthur I. Appleton | 1 mile | 1:34.66 | $216,250 | III | |
| 1996 | Dumaani | 5 | Julie Krone | Kiaran P. McLaughlin | Shadwell Farm (Rick Nichols Lessee) | 1 mile | 1:35.68 | $215,875 | III | |
Keeneland Breeders' Cup Stakes
| 1995 | Dumaani | 4 | Julie Krone | Kiaran P. McLaughlin | Shadwell Farm (Rick Nichols Lessee) | 1 mile | 1:38.78 | $187,925 | III | |
| 1994 | ƒ Weekend Madness (IRE) | 4 | Shane Sellers | Burk Kessinger Jr. | New Phoenix Stable (Gary Drake, et al.) | 1 mile | 1:38.73 | $187,625 | III | |
| 1993 | Coaxing Matt | 4 | Eddie Martin Jr. | Neil L. Pessin | Elmer E. Miller | 1 1/8 miles | 1:53.16 | $187,775 | III | |
| 1992 | Lotus Pool | 5 | Charles R. Woods Jr. | Burk Kessinger Jr. | New Phoenix Stable | 1 1/8 miles | 1:48.36 | $185,325 | III | |
| 1991 | Itsallgreektome | 4 | Jorge Velasquez | Wallace Dollase | Jhayare Stables | 1 1/8 miles | 1:48.42 | $184,000 | III | |
Keeneland Breeders' Cup Handicap
| 1990 | Silver Medallion | 4 | Craig Perret | Philip M. Hauswald | John A. Franks & Brereton C. Jones | 1 1/8 miles | 1:52.20 | $186,750 | III | |
| 1989 | Steinlen (GB) | 6 | Jose A. Santos | D. Wayne Lukas | Wildenstein Stables | 1 1/8 miles | 1:52.40 | $187,850 | III | |
Keeneland Breeders' Cup Stakes
| 1988 | Niccolo Polo | 5 | Don Brumfield | Lorin D. Ranier | Shadowlawn Farm (Tracy & Carol Farmer) | 1 1/8 miles | 1:53.00 | $156,650 | III | |
| 1987 | Storm On the Loose | 4 | Julio C. Espinoza | Harvey L. Vanier | Koichiro Tanikawa | 1 1/8 miles | 1:52.60 | $156,700 | | |
| 1986 | Leprechauns Wish | 4 | Jerry D. Bailey | George R. Arnold II | William Ryan | 1 1/8 miles | 1:51.80 | $125,150 | | |

Legend:
Turf All Weather Track
Notes:
ƒ Filly or Mare

== See also ==
- List of American and Canadian Graded races
