= Up to the Mark =

American-bred Thoroughbred racehorse

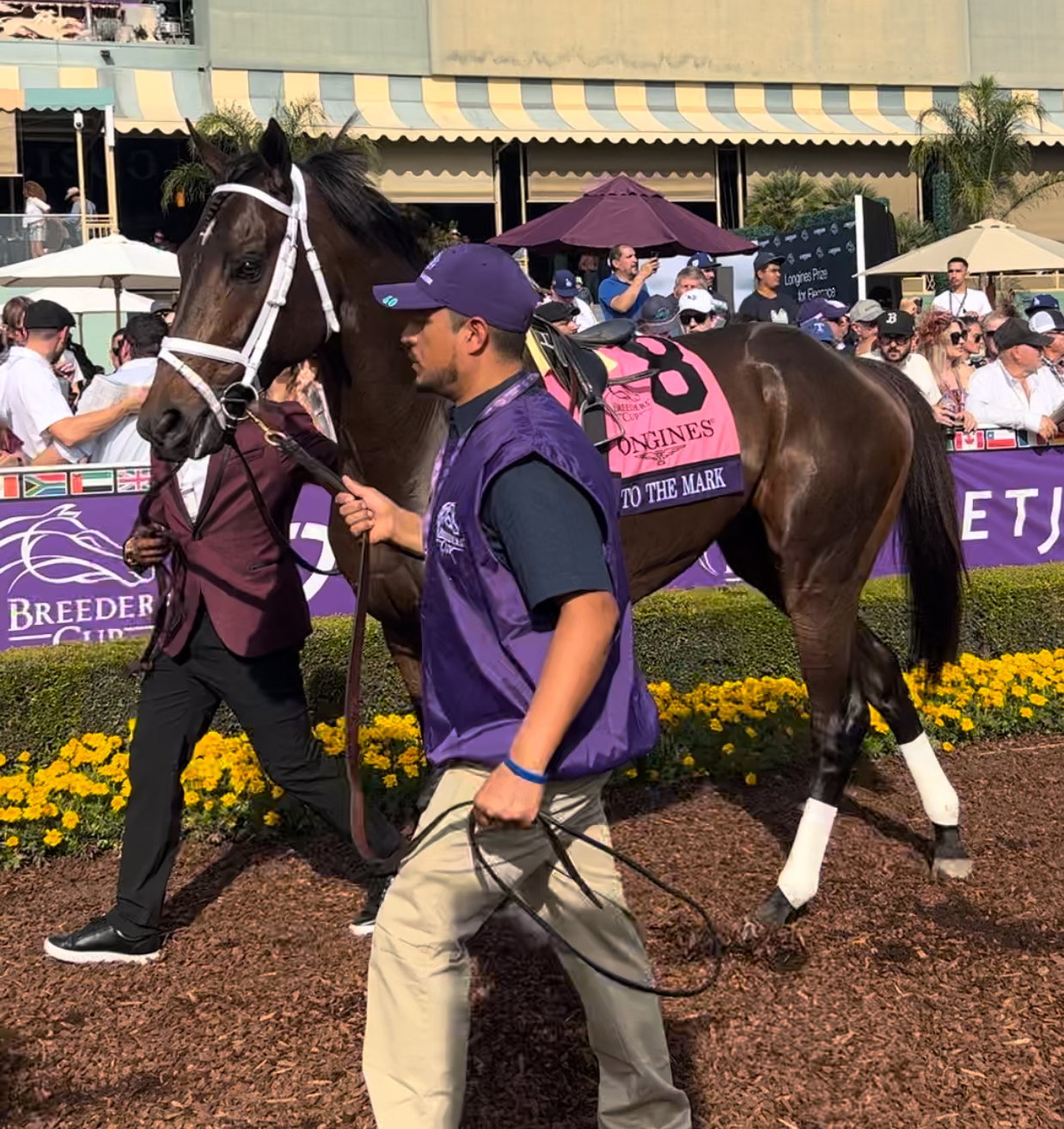
- Up To The Mark before the 2023 Breeders Cup Turf
- Sire: Not This Time
- Grandsire: Giant's Causeway
- Dam: Belle's Final
- Damsire: Ghostzapper
- Sex: Stallion
- Foaled: February 28, 2019
- Country: United States
- Color: Bay
- Breeder: Ramspring Farm
- Owner: Repole Stable & St. Elias Stable
- Trainer: Todd A. Pletcher
- Record: 12: 6-1-2
- Earnings: $2,511,050

Major wins
- Turf Classic Stakes (2023); Manhattan Stakes (2023); Coolmore Turf Mile (2023)

Awards
- American Champion Male Turf Horse (2023)
- Last updated on 1 February 2024

Up to the Mark (foaled February 29, 2019) is a Champion American Thoroughbred racehorse. In 2023 he won three consecutive Grade I events, the Turf Classic Stakes, Manhattan Stakes and Coolmore Turf Mile Stakes.

== Background ==
Up to the Mark is a bay colt that was bred in Kentucky by Ramspring Farm. He was sired by Not This Time, a graded stakes winner who finished second in the 2016 Breeders' Cup Juvenile before his career has cut short by injury. A son of Giant's Causeway, he stood the 2023 breeding season for a fee of $135,000 at Taylor Made Farm near Nicholasville, Kentucky. His dam Belle's Finale, an unraced three-year-old out of Grade 1 winner Capote Belle (Capote) carrying her first foal by Not This Time, was bought by Mary Leigh Patrick of Ramspring Farm at the 2017 Keeneland November Sale for $70,000. Impressed with her first foal, Belle's Finale was sent back Not This Time and in 2019 produced Up to the Mark. Ramspring Farm, a breed-to-sell operation, sent Up to the Mark to the 2020 Keeneland September yearling sales and he was purchased by Mike Repole of Repole Stable and Vinnie Viola of St. Elias Stable for $450,000.

== Career ==
Up to the Mark began his racing career as a three-year-old in a Maiden Special Weight at Saratoga on July 21, 2022, winning the six-furlong event on the dirt. However, after five more unsuccessful tries on the dirt Up to the Mark was sent to Florida and his connections decided to try him on the turf track.

In January 2023, trainer Todd Pletcher gave him a try on the grass and he responded with a four-length victory in an allowance-level race at Gulfstream Park. He then followed that effort with another clear victory in another allowance.

In his stakes debut in April 2023 at the Keeneland spring meet, Up to the Mark finished third in the G1 Maker's Mark Mile Stakes.

After a successful campaign in 2023 Up to the Mark was awarded an Eclipse Award as the U.S. Male Turf Horse.

== Statistics ==
Date	Distance	Race	Grade	Track	Odds	Field	Finish	Winning Time	Winning (Losing) Margin	Jockey	Ref
2022 – three-year-old season
Jul 21, 2022	6 furlongs	Maiden Special Weight		Saratoga	0.90*	6	1	1:10.87	4 1/4 lengths	Irad Ortiz Jr.	
Sep 3, 2022	1 mile	Allowance		Saratoga	1.80*	7	3	1:36.35	(1 1/4 lengths)	Irad Ortiz Jr.	
Sep 29, 2022	1 1/8 miles	Allowance		Aqueduct	3.20	8	6	1:51.55	(10 lengths)	Irad Ortiz Jr.	
Nov 26, 2022	7 furlongs	Allowance		Aqueduct	1.00*	6	4	1:26.04	(5 1/2 lengths)	Irad Ortiz Jr.	
Dec 18, 2022	1 mile	Allowance		Aqueduct	4.50	8	4	1:38.64	(9 lengths)	Manuel Franco	
2023 – four-year-old season
Jan 28, 2023	1 mile	Allowance Optional Claiming		Gulfstream Park	12.60	12	1	1:33.10	4 lengths	Irad Ortiz Jr.	
Mar 4, 2023	1 1/16 miles	Allowance Optional Claiming		Gulfstream Park	0.80*	12	1	1:40.10	1 1/4 lengths	Irad Ortiz Jr.	
Apr 14, 2023	1 mile	Maker's Mark Mile Stakes	I	Keeneland	5.39	8	3	1:33.46	(3 3/4 lengths)	Irad Ortiz Jr.	
May 6, 2023	1 1/8 miles	Turf Classic Stakes	I	Churchill Downs	2.63*	8	1	1:47.31	3 3/4 lengths	Irad Ortiz Jr.	
Jun 10, 2023	1 1/4 miles	Manhattan Stakes	I	Belmont Park	1.65*	10	1	1:59.31	2 3/4 lengths	Irad Ortiz Jr.	
Oct 7, 2023	1 mile	Coolmore Turf Mile	I	Keeneland	2.29	9	1	1:34.18	nose	Jose Ortiz	
Nov 4, 2023	1 1/2 miles	Breeders' Cup Turf	I	Santa Anita	3.40	11	2	2:24.30	(3/4 length)	Irad Ortiz Jr.	

Legend:
Turf Dirt
Notes:
An (*) asterisk after the odds means Up to the Mark was the post-time favorite.

== Pedigree ==
Pedigree of Up to the Mark, bay colt, February 28, 2019
Sire Not This Time (2014)	Giant's Causeway (1997)	Storm Cat (1983)	Storm Bird (CAN) (1978)
Sire Not This Time (2014)	Giant's Causeway (1997)	Storm Cat (1983)	Terlingua (1976)
Sire Not This Time (2014)	Giant's Causeway (1997)	Mariah's Storm (1991)	Rahy (1985)
Sire Not This Time (2014)	Giant's Causeway (1997)	Mariah's Storm (1991)	Immense (1979)
Sire Not This Time (2014)	Miss Macy Sue (2003)	Trippi (1997)	End Sweep (1991)
Sire Not This Time (2014)	Miss Macy Sue (2003)	Trippi (1997)	Jealous Appeal (1983)
Sire Not This Time (2014)	Miss Macy Sue (2003)	Yada Yada (1996)	Great Above (1972)
Sire Not This Time (2014)	Miss Macy Sue (2003)	Yada Yada (1996)	Stem (1982)
Dam Belle's Finale (2014)	Ghostzapper (2000)	Awesome Again (1994)	Deputy Minister (CAN) (1979)
Dam Belle's Finale (2014)	Ghostzapper (2000)	Awesome Again (1994)	Primal Force (1976)
Dam Belle's Finale (2014)	Ghostzapper (2000)	Baby Zip (1991)	Relaunch (1976)
Dam Belle's Finale (2014)	Ghostzapper (2000)	Baby Zip (1991)	Thirty Zip (1983)
Dam Belle's Finale (2014)	Capote Belle (1993)	Capote (1984)	Seattle Slew (1974)
Dam Belle's Finale (2014)	Capote Belle (1993)	Capote (1984)	Too Bald (1964)
Dam Belle's Finale (2014)	Capote Belle (1993)	Rythmical (1985)	Fappiano (1977)
Dam Belle's Finale (2014)	Capote Belle (1993)	Rythmical (1985)	Graceful Gal (1975) (family 13-c)
