= Dennis Albaugh =

American businessman (born 1949)

- Born: Dennis Ray Albaugh; 1949 or 1950 (age 75–76); Fort Dodge, Iowa
- Education: Des Moines Area Community College; Ankeny High School
- Occupation: Businessman
- Known for: Chairman, and founder of Albaugh LLC
- Spouse: Susan Albaugh
- Children: 2 daughters

Dennis Ray Albaugh (born 1949) is an American businessman, and the founder and chairman of Albaugh LLC, a pesticide and fertilizer company. He is a car collector, especially Chevrolets, and owns one of the biggest collections of Chevy convertibles in the US.

== Early life ==
Albaugh is the son of Dean Floyd Albaugh and Lorna Lee Albaugh (née Markert, 1929–2017). His parents farmed near Rockwell City and Somers, Iowa, and later moved to rural Elkhart and Ankeny. He is the second of four children: Mickey, Dennis, Sheryl, and Roland.

Albaugh was born in Des Moines, Iowa and was educated at Des Moines Area Community College.

== Career ==
Albaugh started in business in 1979, selling fertilizer and seeds. After Monsanto's patent ran out on glyphosate in 2001, the chemical used in their best-selling herbicide Roundup, Albaugh began to sell a generic version of the product and bought a factory in Argentina to make it at a competitive price, allowing him to expand the business worldwide.

In 2008, his net worth was estimated by Forbes at US$3.5 billion.

== Car collector ==
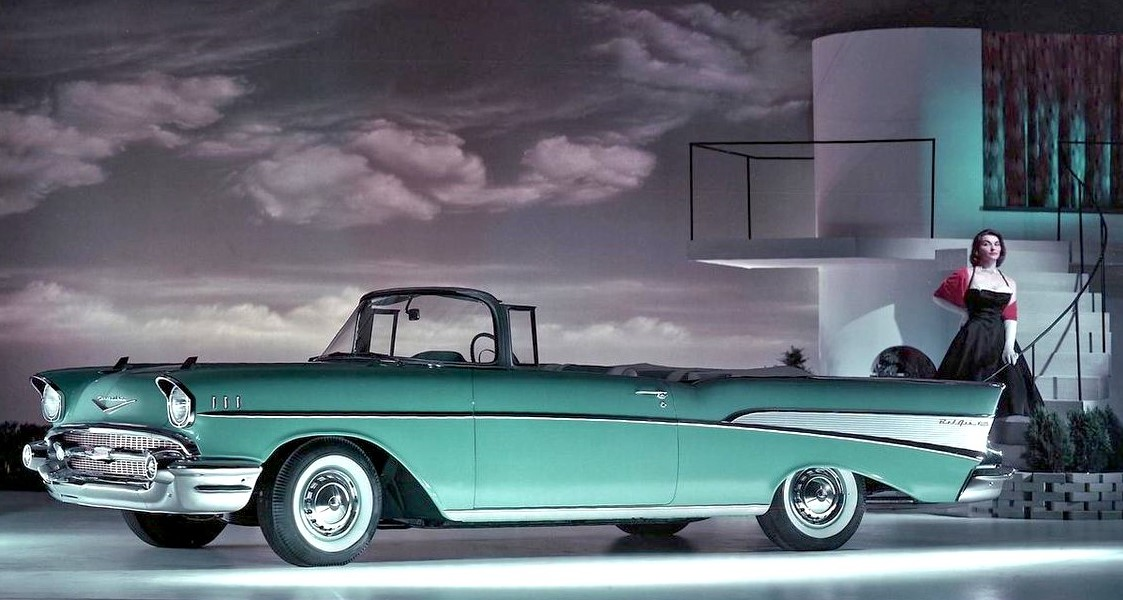
1957 Chevrolet Bel Air Convertible

Albaugh LLC is based in Ankeny, as is Albaugh's collection of 150 classic cars, especially Chevrolet convertibles. Albaugh started the collection with the purchase in 1998 of a 1957 Chevy Bel Air convertible from a golfing friend and told his wife he would stop when he completed the Tri-Five Chevrolets, the 1955, 1956 and 1957 models. His collection of about 150 vehicles, mostly convertibles, includes the Tri-Five Chevrolets as well as Chevy models from 1912 to 1975 and is housed in a 28,000-square-foot (2,600 m^{2}) garage in Ankeny. Albaugh is known to do mechanical work on some of the cars in his collection as time allows. When younger, his father had refused to let him buy a convertible, feeling they were not safe enough. According to Murl Randall, a Chevrolet historian and collector, the collection is "probably the best assemblage of convertible Chevys in the country."

== Personal life ==
Albaugh is married to Susan. They have two daughters and live in Ankeny, a suburb of Des Moines, Iowa. In August 2018, he sold his 10,000-square-foot (930 m^{2}) house in Ankeny to Todd Rueter, an Elkhart businessman, for $2.32 million, having built a slightly smaller 8,773-square-foot (815.0 m^{2}) home nearby.

He owns a private 19-hole golf course, Talons Golf, in Ankeny.
