= William T. Young =

American businessman (1918–2004)

- Born: February 15, 1918; Lexington, Kentucky, U.S.
- Died: January 12, 2004 (aged 85); Gulf Stream, Florida, U.S.
- Education: University of Kentucky
- Political party: Democratic
- Board member of: W. T. Young Foods, Inc., Royal Crown Cola, Kentucky Fried Chicken, Kentucky-American Water Company, First Security National Bank and Trust Co. of Lexington, Transylvania University, Shakertown historic village, Breeders' Cup Limited
- Spouse: Lucy Hilton Maddox
- Children: 2
- Awards: Eclipse Award for Outstanding Breeder (1994); TOBA Breeder of the Year (1999)

William T. Young (February 15, 1918 – January 12, 2004) was an American businessman and major owner of thoroughbred racehorses.

William T. Young attended the University of Kentucky where he was a member of the Sigma Alpha Epsilon fraternity. Young graduated with high distinction in 1939 with a Bachelor of Science in mechanical engineering. After a short employment with Bailey Meter in Cleveland, Ohio, he served as a captain in the United States Army from 1941 to 1945.

== Service In World War II ==
William T. Young served in World War II as a United States Army officer.

== Business career ==
After the War he was living in Philadelphia but in 1946 returned to his native Lexington where he founded W. T. Young Foods, Inc. that made "Big Top" brand peanut butter. He developed the business into one of the leading producers of peanut butter in the United States. After he sold the company to Procter & Gamble in 1955, it was renamed Jif peanut butter. William Young continued to manage the peanut butter manufacturing operation for Procter & Gamble until 1957, at which time he founded W. T. Young Storage, Inc.

William Young joined the board of directors of Royal Crown Cola and served as its chairman from 1966 to 1984. He was also a director the Kentucky-American Water Company, and the First Security National Bank and Trust Company of Lexington. At one time, William Young was the single largest shareholder of Humana health insurance company. Through the 1960s and early 1970s, he served on the board of directors of Kentucky Fried Chicken with CEO John Y. Brown Jr. When Brown was elected governor of Kentucky in December 1979, he chose Young as chairman of the executive cabinet. Young also served as chairman of the Kentucky Economic Development Corporation, a private organization aimed at boosting economic development in the state. Brooke

=== Overbrook Farm ===
In 1972 William Young established Overbrook Farm near Lexington, Kentucky. In 1983 he bred Storm Cat, the most important horse of his career. Storm Cat went on to become one of the world's highest priced sires and almost entirely responsible for William Young being voted the 1994 Eclipse Award for Outstanding Breeder.

Teamed with trainer D. Wayne Lukas, in 1994 Overbrook won the Breeders' Cup Juvenile Fillies with Flanders and was a partner in Timber Country who won that year's Breeders' Cup Juvenile. Overbrook also bred Tabasco Cat on a foal share partnership agreement with Reynolds Metals Chairman, David P. Reynolds. Tabasco Cat won the 1994 Preakness and Belmont Stakes.

Overbrook won the 1996 Kentucky Derby with the home-bred colt Grindstone and captured his second Breeders' Cup Juvenile that fall with Boston Harbor. In 1999 he won the 1999 Breeders' Cup Classic with Cat Thief.

Active in the horse racing industry, William Young served as a director of the Breeders' Cup Limited. His daughter Lucy married renowned French horse trainer François Boutin and remains active in the industry.

On June 9, 2009, William Young Jr., who assumed control of the Overbrook operation upon the death of his father, announced that his family would be selling the majority of their bloodstock. During the next few months Overbrook sold off its resident stallions then in September sold 48 yearlings for $6,644,000 and in November sold 148 horses for $31,760,000 including Honest Pursuit, a daughter of Storm Cat who sold for $3.1 million to Wertheimer et Frère.

== Philanthropy ==
Young was a community leader in such organizations as the YMCA, Junior Achievement, Spindletop Research, the Red Cross, and the Cancer Drive. He was a University of Kentucky trustee and donated $5 million of his own money while helping raise additional funds to build a new library at the University of Kentucky that would be named the William T. Young Library in his honor. He further created a book endowment and campaigned for donations to fund it. At the time of his death the endowment was the largest of its kind in the United States. William Young was inducted into the College of Engineering Hall of Distinction in 1992. Appointed to the board of trustees of Transylvania University in 1967, he served as its chairman for twenty-three years from 1977 to 2000 and was a most important figure in the university's expansion and betterment.

In 1985, William Young joined the board of historic Shakertown near Lexington and was appointed its chairman in 1990. In that role, he was instrumental in raising funds for important renovations needed to increase visitor revenues and as well he set up a program to insure the village's financial stability.

Overall, William Young donated more than $60 million to various causes.

His wife, the former Lucy Hilton Maddox, died in 2002 and he died in 2004. He was survived by a son, William T. Young Jr., and daughter, Lucy Young Hamilton.
