= Prairie Meadows =

Casino in Iowa, United States

Coordinates: 41.654782°N 93.488385°W

- Prairie Meadows Logo
- Location: Altoona, Iowa, United States
- Owned by: Polk County, Iowa
- Operated by: 13-Member Board of Directors
- Date opened: March 1, 1989
- Race type: Thoroughbred, Quarter Horse
- Notable races: Cornhusker Handicap
- Attendance: 2.7 Million Annually

Prairie Meadows is a Racino located in Altoona, Iowa, United States, it runs both Thoroughbreds and Quarter Horses at its meet from May to September.

== History and information ==
Prairie Meadows in March 2007

In 1984, Prairie Meadows received a license from the Iowa Racing and Gaming commission to operate a horse racing facility after parimutuel betting was legalized by the state the previous year. In 1987, groundbreaking ceremonies were held for Prairie Meadows.

Prairie Meadows conducted its first day of racing on March 1, 1989. However, the track lost money during its first few years of operation and filed for bankruptcy in November 1991. Live racing was suspended for the 1992 season before revenues from off-track betting allowed racing to resume the following year.

On May 17, 1994, Polk County voters approved a referendum allowing the installation of slot machines at Prairie Meadows. On April 1, 1995, the slot machine casino opened at Prairie Meadows, and by the end of 1996, Prairie Meadows was able to pay off the bonds that were issued by the Polk County Board of Supervisors.

On December 14, 2004, Prairie Meadows added casino game tables after receiving state approval to do so. As a result of the high demand for these tables, the Iowa Racing and Gaming Commission approved Prairie Meadows' plans to expand its facility on January 25, 2005. Construction on the $60 million expansion began in September 2005. An addition to the casino opened in August 2006, while two new restaurants and a 1,200-seat concert hall known as "The Meadows" opened in February 2007.

Prairie Meadows is owned by Polk County and operated by a local, non-profit, 13-member board of directors. The revenues generated by Prairie Meadows are given to various community projects in the Des Moines area, including construction of the Iowa Events Center complex in downtown Des Moines. Prairie Meadows' gross revenue for the 12-month period ending June 30, 2008, was nearly $193 million. That total ranked second to the Horseshoe Casino in Council Bluffs among Iowa's casinos.

On January 16, 2019, Prairie Meadows announced a partnership with bookmaker William Hill in preparation for the proposed legalization of sports betting in Iowa.

== Physical attributes ==
Prairie Meadows has a one-mile dirt track with a chute for quarter horses. On site is a casino with 1,900 slot machines and casino game tables featuring games such as poker, roulette, and blackjack. The track area has also hosted free concerts by national musical acts in recent years.

== Racing ==
Horses are about to cross the finish line during a September 5, 2005, race at Prairie Meadows

Prairie Meadows runs many stakes and handicaps during its April to October season.

=== Graded events ===
The following Graded events were held at Prairie Meadows in 2023.

Grade III

- Iowa Oaks
- Prairie Meadows Cornhusker Handicap

The track is also home of the Iowa Derby, the Iowa Sprint stakes, the Iowa Distaff, and the Iowa Breeders Derby, among others.

In addition, other animals such as ostriches have raced at the facility.
