= Wishing Well Stakes =

The Wishing Well Stakes is an American Thoroughbred horse race run annually in mid January at Turfway Park in Florence, Kentucky. Open to fillies and mare age four and older, it is raced on Polytrack synthetic dirt over a distance of six furlongs.

First run in 1983, the race is named in honor of Wishing Well, a winner of twelve races and the dam of National Museum of Racing and Hall of Fame inductee, Sunday Silence.
