= Turfway Park =

Horse racing track in Florence, Kentucky, US

Coordinates: 39.025202°N 84.634906°W

- Interactive map of Turfway Park
- Location: Boone County, near Florence, Kentucky, U.S.
- Owned by: Churchill Downs, Inc.
- Date opened: 1959
- Course type: Flat/Thoroughbred
- Notable races: Jeff Ruby Steaks (G3); Kentucky Cup Classic Stakes (G3)

Turfway Park is an American horse racing track located within the city limits of Florence, Kentucky, about 10 miles (16 km) south of the Ohio River at Cincinnati. The track conducts live Thoroughbred horse racing during two meets each year—Holiday (December), and Winter/Spring (January to late March/early April)—and offers year-round simulcast wagering from tracks across the continent.

In 2009, the Horseplayers Association of North America introduced a rating system for (currently) 62 Thoroughbred racetracks in North America. In 2016, Turfway was ranked #11.

== History and information ==
Turfway Park opened in Florence, Kentucky, in 1959 as Latonia Race Course. The track is located about 10 miles south of the original Latonia Race Track in Covington, Kentucky, which hosted Thoroughbred racing from 1883 until it was torn down in 1939. The original Latonia was home to the important Latonia Derby, which rivaled the Kentucky Derby in prestige for many years and shared many of the same horses. The Florence track's name was changed to Turfway Park when Jerry Carroll and his partners purchased the facility in 1986.

In 1999, Carroll sold the track in equal parts to lottery equipment manufacturer Gtech, gaming conglomerate Harrah's Entertainment (later renamed as Caesars Entertainment), and the non-profit Keeneland Association, which operates the Lexington, Kentucky, race track and Thoroughbred auction facility. In 2005, Gtech sold its interests to the other partners, leaving Keeneland and Harrah's with 50-50 interests.

Turfway is home to the Jeff Ruby Steaks, established by then-general manager John Battaglia in 1972 as the Spiral Stakes. Battaglia (see: John Battaglia Memorial Stakes) envisioned a race from which 3-year-olds would "spiral up" to the Blue Grass Stakes at Keeneland and then to the Kentucky Derby. The race was sponsored from 1982 through 1998 by Jim Beam Distillers, and for one year (1999) by GalleryFurniture.com. Lane's End Farm, one of the world's leading Thoroughbred breeding and sales operations, sponsored the race from 2002 through 2010. Horse farm giant Vinery Stables sponsored the Spiral in 2011 and 2012, and Horseshoe Casino Cincinnati (renamed as Jack Cincinnati Casino in 2017) took over sponsorship in 2013. In 2018 the race was renamed the Jeff Ruby Steaks (a homophone of the word Stakes) as part of a three-year agreement with the owners of Jeff Ruby's Steakhouses. The race attained Grade II status in 1988 but was downgraded to Grade III in 2011.

Turfway Park was also home to the Kentucky Cup Day of Champions, patterned after (and a prep for) the Breeders' Cup World Championships. The card included five stakes, four of them graded, including the Grade II Kentucky Cup Classic, and was traditionally run four weeks before the Breeders' Cup. The Kentucky Cup series was last run in 2011.

In 2008, the Turfway Park Fall Championship (G3) was named a Breeders' Cup Challenge "Win and You're In" race, with its winner guaranteed a spot in the Breeders' Cup Marathon. The race last ran in 2010, the year winner Eldaafer also won the Breeders' Cup Marathon.

Turfway combined with Churchill Downs, Inc. and other investors to purchase Dueling Grounds Race Course near Franklin, Kentucky; Turfway retains a small share in the track, since renamed Kentucky Downs.

In 2005, Turfway Park became the first track in North America to install Polytrack, an all-weather product, as a racing surface. The visible component combines silica sand, wax, and various fibers; the hidden drainage component allows water to drain quickly through the surface, eliminating the freeze-and-thaw cycles that plagued the track during its winter meets. With the installation, Turfway's track condition is always officially listed as "fast," no matter the weather.

Turfway Park was the fictional setting of the 2005 adventure/comedy movie Racing Stripes. However, no filming took place at Turfway Park; the track was mentioned in name only.

In 2012, Dan Gilbert's Rock Gaming (later renamed as Jack Entertainment) bought a 40 percent stake in Turfway Park from Keeneland. Rock Gaming bought out Caesars's 50 percent stake in the track in 2015.

In April 2019, Jack Entertainment agreed to sell its stake in Turfway Park to Hard Rock International. The transaction was part of a $780-million deal that would also include Jack Cincinnati Casino (which accounted for $745 million of the sale price). Churchill Downs, Inc. later replaced Hard Rock as the buyer, agreeing to pay $36 million to Jack and $10 million to Hard Rock. Churchill completed its purchase of the property in October 2019 and said it would demolish the existing grandstand and build a new facility including a historical racing parlor.

== Physical attributes ==
The track is a one-mile oval with quarter-mile and 6½ furlong chutes. The stretch covers 970 feet. In 2020, the Polytrack surface was replaced with Tapeta, a synthetic surface consisting of a mixture of silica sand, wax, and fibres. Turfway Park has no turf course.

The grandstand was razed in 2020 to make way for a new facility. The property contains stabling for about 1,000 horses.

== TV Personalities ==
- Mike Battaglia (1973–2016) he continues as an associate vice president)
- Jimmy McNerney (2016–2023) Track Announcer/Television Host

Tony Calo (2023-Present) Track Announcer

Kaitlin Benson (2021–Present) Television Analyst

Ed Derosa (2021) Television Analyst

== Racing ==
Turfway Park has offered the following stakes races. * indicates active races.

=== Graded events ===
The following Graded events are held at Turfway Park.

Grade III

- Jeff Ruby Steaks
- Kentucky Cup Classic Stakes

=== Other events ===
Winter/Spring Meet

- Turfway Prevue Stakes
- Wishing Well Stakes
- Cincinnati Trophy Stakes*
- Clipsetta Stakes
- Forego Stakes*
- Animal Kingdom Stakes
- Likely Exchange Stakes
- Dust Commander Stakes
- Valdale Stakes
- Latonia Stakes
- Tejano Run Stakes
- Bourbonette Oaks
- Queen Stakes
- Rushaway Stakes*
- Hansel Stakes
- Fairway Fun Stakes
- John Battaglia Memorial Stakes*

Holiday Meet

- Holiday Inaugural Stakes*
- My Charmer Stakes
- Prairie Bayou Stakes*
- Gowell Stakes
- Holiday Cheer Stakes

== Newport Racing and Gaming ==
Turfway Park's sister property, Newport Racing & Gaming, is a gaming facility in Newport, Kentucky. It is located in the Newport Shopping Center, directly across the Ohio River from Cincinnati, Ohio and owned and operated by Louisville-based Churchill Downs Incorporated. The $38.4 million facility officially opened on Friday October 2, 2020.

There are no casinos in Kentucky due to its gambling laws which only allow for betting on horse racing, so it has 500 historical racing machines on a 16,000 square foot gaming floor. The machines look like and play much like slot machines but are allowed under Kentucky gambling laws. The betting outcomes are based on actual horse race results from over 100 years of historical data to determine winning combinations with a pari-mutuel formula that determines payouts. There is a 4,000 square foot simulcast area where guests can watch and wager on horse racing from across the country including at the nearby Turfway Park Racing & Gaming in Florence, Kentucky, which is also owned and operated by Churchill Downs.

On Wednesday, November 24, 2021, Newport Racing & Gaming opened a 14,000 sq. ft. addition to the property that included a separate indoor area for smoking and gaming featuring a new bar and stage area for live entertainment. The build out effectively created two distinct areas within the property, with the new area designated for smoking and the original gaming floor which has remained smoke-free.

It has a food and beverage outlet – Smiley's Bar & Grille.
