= 2014 Road to the Kentucky Oaks =

The 2014 Road to the Kentucky Oaks was a points system by which three-year-old fillies qualified for the 2014 Kentucky Oaks. The point system replaced a previous qualifying system which was based on graded stakes earnings.

The number of races was originally reduced to 29 for the 2014 season (15 prep races and 14 championship season races). Due to a scheduling change of Las Virgenes, the Santa Ysabel replaced its spot in the first leg of the Kentucky Oaks Championship Series. The Las Virgenes was then added as a Kentucky Oaks Prep Season race bringing the total number of races in the entire series to 30.

Untapable was both the leading qualifier for and winner of the 2014 Oaks. Untapable earned a total of 160 points by winning the Pocahontas (10 points), Rachel Alexandra (50 points) and Fair Grounds Oaks (100 points).

== Standings ==
2014 point standings
Rank	Horse	Points	Owner	Trainer	Earnings	Ref
**1**	**Untapable**	**160**	**Winchell Thoroughbreds LLC**	**Steve Asmussen**	**$521,125**	
2	Sugar Shock	130	On Cloud Nine LLC	Doug Anderson	$270,000	
3	Fashion Plate	110	Arnold Zetcher LLC & Michael B. Tabor	Simon Callaghan	$420,000	
---	Awesome Baby	110	Kaleem Shah, Inc.	Bob Baffert	$309,250	
---	In Tune	100	Wertheimer et Frère	Todd Pletcher	$180,000	
4	My Miss Sophia	100	Mathis Stable LLC	Todd Pletcher	$180,000	
5	Rosalind	78	Landaluce Educe Stables	Kenny McPeek	$536,311	
---	Euphrosyne	74	Gillian S. Campbell, Ralph Stayer, Shelly Stayer, Dan Clark & Greg Skoda	Steve Asmussen	$150,000	
---	Room Service	70	Mary & Gary West	Wayne Catalano	$270,000	
6	Got Lucky	64	Hill 'n' Dale Equine Holdings, Inc. & Philip J. Steinberg	Todd Pletcher	$180,000	
7	Aurelia's Belle	64	James F. Miller	Wayne Catalano	$142,850	
---	Onlyforyou	60	Glencrest Farms LLC	Todd Pletcher	$240,000	
---	Ihtimal	50	Godolphin	Saeed bin Suroor	$448,298	
---	House Rules	60	Joseph V. Shields Jr.	Allen Jerkens	$100,000	
8	Ria Antonia	55	Christopher T. Dunn & Loooch Racing Stable, Inc.	Jeremiah Englehart	$1,211,791	
9	Kiss Moon	45	Carl F. Pollard	David Vance	$87,900	
---	Fiftyshadesofgold	40	Estate of Clarence Scharbauer Jr.	Bret Calhoun	$166,090	
10	Unbridled Forever	30	Charles E. Fipke	Dallas Stewart	$115,000	
---	Feedyah	20	Sheikh Ahmed Bin Rashid Al Maktoum	Charlie Appleby	$77,463	
---	Sweet Reason	25	Treadway Racing Stable (Jeff Treadway)	Leah Gyarmati	$430,000	
---	Stopchargingmaria	22	Repole Stable (Mike Repole)	Todd Pletcher	$526,000	
11	Thank You Mary Lou	20	Kenneth & Sarah Ramsey	Mike Maker	$178,200	
---	America	20	Bobby Flay	Bill Mott	$45,000	
---	Artemis	20	Peachtree Stable	Jerry Hollendorfer	$26,250	
---	Sloan Square	20	Michael B. Tabor	Todd Pletcher	$23,500	
12	Empress of Midway	15	Daniel Kramer	Doug O'Neill	$32,000	
---	Lucky for You	15	Michael B. Tabor	Todd Pletcher	$32,000	
---	Fierce Boots	11	Bobby Flay	Todd Pletcher	$65,286	
---	Testa Rossi	10	James Covello, Thomas Coleman & Doheny Racing Stable	Chad Brown	$415,000	
---	Joint Return	10	Main Line Racing Stable	John Servis	$108,494	
---	Shanon Nicole	10	Connie M. Apostelos	Mike Maker	$21,850	
---	Swiss Lake Yodeler	10	Mr. & Mrs. Larry D. Williams	Jerry Hollendorfer	$13,000	
---	My Conquestadory	10	Conquest Stables, LLC	Mark Casse	$415,908	
---	Artemis Agrotera	10	Chester & Mary Broman Sr.	Michael E. Hushion	$360,000	
---	Tepin	10	Robert E. Masterson	Mark Casse	$306,184	
---	Secret Compass	10	Mary & Gary West	Bob Baffert	$168,000	
---	Madly Truly	10	John C. Oxley	Mark Casse	$112,131	
---	Vexed	10	Claiborne Farm & Adele B. Dilschneider	Albert Stall Jr.	$111,938	
---	Aragorn Ami	10	Ivan Dalos	Josie Carroll	$60,000	
---	Mary Rita	10	Fox Hill Farms, Inc.	J. Larry Jones	$16,000	
---	Camille Claudel	10	Sycamore Racing, LLC	Francis Abbott III	$15,667	
---	Katie's Eyes	10	Ike & Dawn Thrash, Janet & Sam Alley	Grant T. Forster	$11,750	
---	She's a Tiger	8	Mark DeDomenico LLC or Aldrich or Downey et al.	Jeffrey L. Bonde	$710,000	
---	Penwith	7	Darley Stable	Kiaran McLaughlin	$56,000	
---	Stonetastic	6	Stoneway Farm	Kelly Breen	$71,181	
---	Taste Like Candy	5	Bad Boy Racing LLC & Whizway Farms	Jerry Hollendorfer	$148,000	
---	Courageous Julie	5	Zayat Stables, LLC (Ahmed Zayat)	D. Wayne Lukas	$19,500	
---	La Mejor Fiesta	5	Ice Wine Stable	Wesley A. Ward	$46,890	
---	Saintly Joan	5	Steven T. Bajer, Gem, Inc. & Dustin O'Hara	John O'Hara	$18,500	
---	D'ya Knowwhatimean	5	Hotter Than H Racing	Peter Miller	$8,000	
---	Bird Maker	4	Marylou Whitney Stables LLC	Ian Wilkes	$32,120	
---	Streaming	4	Hill 'n' Dale Equine Holdings Inc. & Edward McGhee	Bob Baffert	$322,000	
---	Bahnah	4	Wayne Sanders & Larry Hirsch	Bret Calhoun	$166,500	
---	Divine Beauty	4	Brereton C. Jones	J. Larry Jones	$55,000	
---	Vero Amore	4	Swilcan Stables	Robert Reid Jr.	$40,000	
---	Unspurned	4	Christine Hayden	Roger Attfield	$37,285	
---	Flipcup	4	Team Penney Racing	George Weaver	$20,000	
---	Ketel Twist	3	Turf Stable (Rusty Jones)	Bill Mott	$15,286	
---	Concave	2	Reddam Racing LLC	Doug O'Neill	$176,250	
---	Arethusa	2	Darley Stable	Eoin Harty	$126,000	
---	Fascinating	2	Lunsford & Hill 'n' Dale Equine Holdings, Inc.	Bob Baffert	$90,000	
---	Battlefield Angel	2	Eclipse Thoroughbred Partners	Wayne Catalano	$41,000	
---	Crushed Velvet	2	Peachtree Stable	Bob Baffert	$24,000	
---	Resistivity	2	Mike G. Rutherford	Mark Casse	$20,000	
---	Express Model	2	L T B Inc. & Hillerich Racing LLC	Bernard S. Flint	$16,500	
---	Morant Bay	2	Phillip Brooks	Cary Brooks	$16,026	
---	Fleet of Gold	2	LNJ Foxwoods	Tony Dutrow	$11,000	
---	Ireland	2	Calumet Farm (Brad Kelley)	D. Wayne Lukas	$11,850	
---	Synapse	1	Glen C. Warren	Andy Leggio Jr.	$121,000	
---	Divided Attention	1	Darley Stable	Kiaran McLaughlin	$75,000	
13	Please Explain	0	Niall Racing	Tom Proctor	$47,667	
Sidelined/Inactive/Not under consideration/Not Kentucky Oaks nominated in gray; Qualifiers for Kentucky Oaks in pink; Winner of Kentucky Oaks in **bold**

== Prep Season races ==
Prep season
Race	Distance	Surface	Purse	Track	Date	1st	2nd	3rd	4th	Ref
Pocahontas	1 1/16 miles	Dirt	$150,000	Churchill Downs	Sep. 7, 2013	Untapable	Stonetastic	Rosalind	Milam	
Chandelier	1 1/16 miles	Dirt	$250,000	Santa Anita	Sep. 28, 2013	Secret Compass	She's a Tiger	Fascinating	Harlington's Rose	
Alcibiades	1 1/16 miles	Synthetic	$400,000	Keeneland	Oct. 4, 2013	My Conquestadory	Rosalind	Battlefield Angel	Who's In Town	
Mazarine	1 1/16 miles	Synthetic	$200,000	Woodbine	Oct. 5, 2013	Madly Truly	Unspurned	Morant Bay	Spanish Flower	
Frizette	1 mile	Dirt	$400,000	Belmont	Oct. 5, 2013	Artemis Agrotera	Sweet Reason	Stopchargingmaria	Divided Attention	
Breeders' Cup Juvenile Fillies	1 1/16 miles	Dirt	$2,000,000	Santa Anita	Nov. 2, 2013	Ria Antonia	She's a Tiger	Rosalind	Sweet Reason	
Delta Downs Princess	1 mile	Dirt	$500,000	Delta Downs	Nov. 23, 2013	Tepin	Bahnah	Concave	Synapse	
Golden Rod	1 1/16 miles	Dirt	$150,000	Churchill Downs	Nov. 30, 2013	Vexed	Bird Maker	Stonetastic	Naive Enough	
Demoiselle	1 1/8 miles	Dirt	$250,000	Aqueduct	Nov. 30, 2013	Stopchargingmaria	Got Lucky	Penwith	Lexi Morgan	
Busanda	1 mile 70 yards	Dirt	$100,000	Aqueduct	Jan. 4, 2014	Fierce Boots	Flipcup	Fleet Of Gold	Ketel Twist	
Santa Ynez	6 1/2 furlongs	Dirt	$125,000	Santa Anita	Jan. 4, 2014	Awesome Baby	Tastes Like Candy	Crushed Velvet	Uzziel	
Silverbulletday	1 mile 70 yards	Dirt	$125,000	Fair Grounds	Jan. 18, 2014	Unbridled Forever	Divine Beauty	Express Model	Army	
Forward Gal	7 furlongs	Dirt	$200,000	Gulfstream	Jan. 25, 2014	Onlyforyou	Aurelia's Belle	Resistivity	My Dear Regina	
Martha Washington	1 mile	Dirt	$75,000	Oaklawn	Feb. 1, 2014	Aragorn Ami	Euphrosyne	Ireland	Cow Catcher	
Busher	1 1/16 miles	Dirt	$100,000	Aqueduct	Feb. 1, 2014	Joint Return	Vero Amore	Ketel Twist	Fierce Boots	
Las Virgenes	1 mile	Dirt	$300,000	Santa Anita	Feb. 1, 2014	Fashion Plate	Streaming	Arethusa	Tastes Like Candy	
Note: 1st=10 points; 2nd=4 points; 3rd=2 points; 4th=1 point

== Championship Series races ==
2014 Championship Series
First leg of series
Race	Distance	Surface	Purse	Track	Date	1st	2nd	3rd	4th	Ref
Rachel Alexandra	1 1/16 miles	Dirt	$200,000	Fair Grounds	Feb. 22, 2014	Untapable	Got Lucky	Shanon Nicole	Ria Antonia	
Davona Dale	1 1/16 miles	Dirt	$250,000	Gulfstream	Feb. 22, 2014	Onlyforyou	House Rules	Aurelia's Belle	Penwith	
UAE Oaks	1 3/16 miles	Synthetic	$250,000	Meydan	Feb. 27, 2014	Ihtimal	Feedyah	Mensoora	Magrooma	
Santa Ysabel	1 1/16 miles	Dirt	$100,000	Santa Anita	Mar. 1, 2014	Awesome Baby	Artemis	Swiss Lake Yodeler	Saintly Joan	
Honeybee	1 1/16 miles	Dirt	$150,000	Oaklawn	Mar. 8, 2014	Euphrosyne	Sugar Shock	Please Explain	Kiss Moon	
Bourbonette Oaks	1 mile	Synthetic	$100,000	Turfway	Mar. 22, 2014	Aurelia's Belle	Sloane Square	Katie's Eyes	La Mejor Fiesta	
Sunland Park Oaks	1 1/16 miles	Dirt	$200,000	Sunland	Mar. 23, 2014	Awesome Baby	DH-Lucky for You (Note: Lucky for You and Empress of Midway finished in a dead heat and are each awarded 15 points.)	DH-Empress of Midway	D'ya Knowwhatimean	
Note: 1st=50 points; 2nd=20 points; 3rd=10 points; 4th=5 points
Second leg of series
Race	Distance	Surface	Purse	Track	Date	1st	2nd	3rd	4th	Ref
Gulfstream Oaks	1 1/8 miles	Dirt	$300,000	Gulfstream	Mar. 29, 2014	In Tune	House Rules	America	Camille Claudel	
Fair Grounds Oaks	1 1/16 miles	Dirt	$500,000	Fair Grounds	Mar. 29, 2014	Untapable	Fiftyshadesofgold	Unbridled Forever	Mary Rita	
Ashland	1 1/16 miles	Synthetic	$500,000	Keeneland	Apr. 5, 2014	DH-Rosalind (Note: Rosalind and Room Service finished in a dead heat and are each awarded 70 points.)	DH-Room Service	Thank You Marylou	Testa Rossi	
Santa Anita Oaks	1 1/16 miles	Dirt	$400,000	Santa Anita	Apr. 5, 2014	Fashion Plate	Ria Antonia	Bajan	Honey Ride	
Gazelle	1 mile	Dirt	$250,000	Aqueduct	Apr. 5, 2014	My Miss Sophia	Got Lucky	Sweet Reason	Vero Amore	
Fantasy	1 1/16 miles	Dirt	$400,000	Oaklawn	Apr. 5, 2014	Sugar Shock	Kiss Moon	Euphrosyne	Stopchargingmaria	
Note: 1st=100 points; 2nd=40 points; 3rd=20 points; 4th=10 points
"Wild Card"
Race	Distance	Surface	Purse	Track	Date	1st	2nd	3rd	4th	Ref
Beaumont	7 furlongs	Synthetic	$150,000	Keeneland	Apr. 13, 2014	Ready to Act	Sweet Whisky	Katie's Eyes	Richies Party Girl	
Note: 1st=10 points; 2nd=4 points; 3rd=2 points; 4th=1 points
