= Forward Gal Stakes top three finishers =

This is a listing of the horses that finished in either first, second, or third place and the number of starters in the Forward Gal Stakes, an American Grade 2 race for three-year-old fillies at 7 furlongs on dirt held at Gulfstream Park in Hallandale Beach, Florida. (List 1981-present)

Year	Winner	Second	Third	Starters
2016	Cathryn Sophia	Island Saint	Ballet Diva	
2015	Birdatthewire	Lassofthemohicans	Taylor S	
2014	Onlyforyou	Aurelia's Belle	Resistivity	6
2013	Kauai Katie	My Happy Face	Pow Wow Wow	6
2012	Broadway's Alibi	Say A Novena	Sacristy	6
2011	Pomeroys Pistol	Dancinginherdreams	Evil Queen	7
2010	Bickersons	Joanie's Catch	Liam's Dream	11
2009	Frolic's Dream	Renda	Dr. Zic	n/a
2008	Bsharpsonata	Keep the Peace	Melissa Jo	7
2007	Forever Together	Silver Knockers	You Asked	7
2006	Miraculous Miss	India	Misty Rosette	10
2005	Letgomyego	Little Money Down	Hot Storm	7
2004	Madcap Escapade	La Reina	Frenchglen	5
2003	Midnight Cry	Final Round	Chimichurri	8
2002	Take the Cake	A New Twist	Cherokee Girl	7
2001	Gold Mover	Hazino	Thunder Bertie	5
2000	Miss Inquisitive	Swept Away	Regally Appealing	9
1999	China Storm	Three Ring	Extended Applause	5
1998	Uanme	Diamond On the Run	Holy Capote	7
1997	Glitter Woman	City Band	Southern Playgirl	6
1996	Mindy Gayle	Marfa's Finale	Supah Jen	7
1995	Chaposa Springs	Culver City	Mackenzie Slew	7
1994	Mynameispanama	Frigid Coed	Wonderlan	9
1993	Sum Runner	Boot n' Jackie	Lunar Spook	9
1992	Spinning Round	Patty's Princess	Super Doer	5
1991	Withallprobability	Private Treasure	Far Out Nurse	8
1990	Charon	Trumpet's Blare	De La Devil	8
1989	Open Mind	Surging	Georgies Doctor	9
1988	On to Royalty	Social Pro	Most Likely	10
1987	Added Elegance	Beau Love Flowers	Easter Mary	11
1986	Noranc	Dancing Danzig	I'm Sweets	8
1985	Lucy Manette	Grand Glory	Boldly Dared	13
1984	Miss Oceana	Katrinka	Scorched Panties	5
1983	Unaccompanied	Lisa's Capital	Quixotic Lady	15
1982 #	Trove	Here's to Peg	Wendy's Ten	8
1982 #	All Manners	Acharmer	Smart Heiress	9
1981	Dame Mysterieuse	Heavenly Cause	Masters Dream	10

A # designates that the race was run in two divisions in 1982.
