= Eric Topol =

American cardiologist, scientist, and author (born 1954)

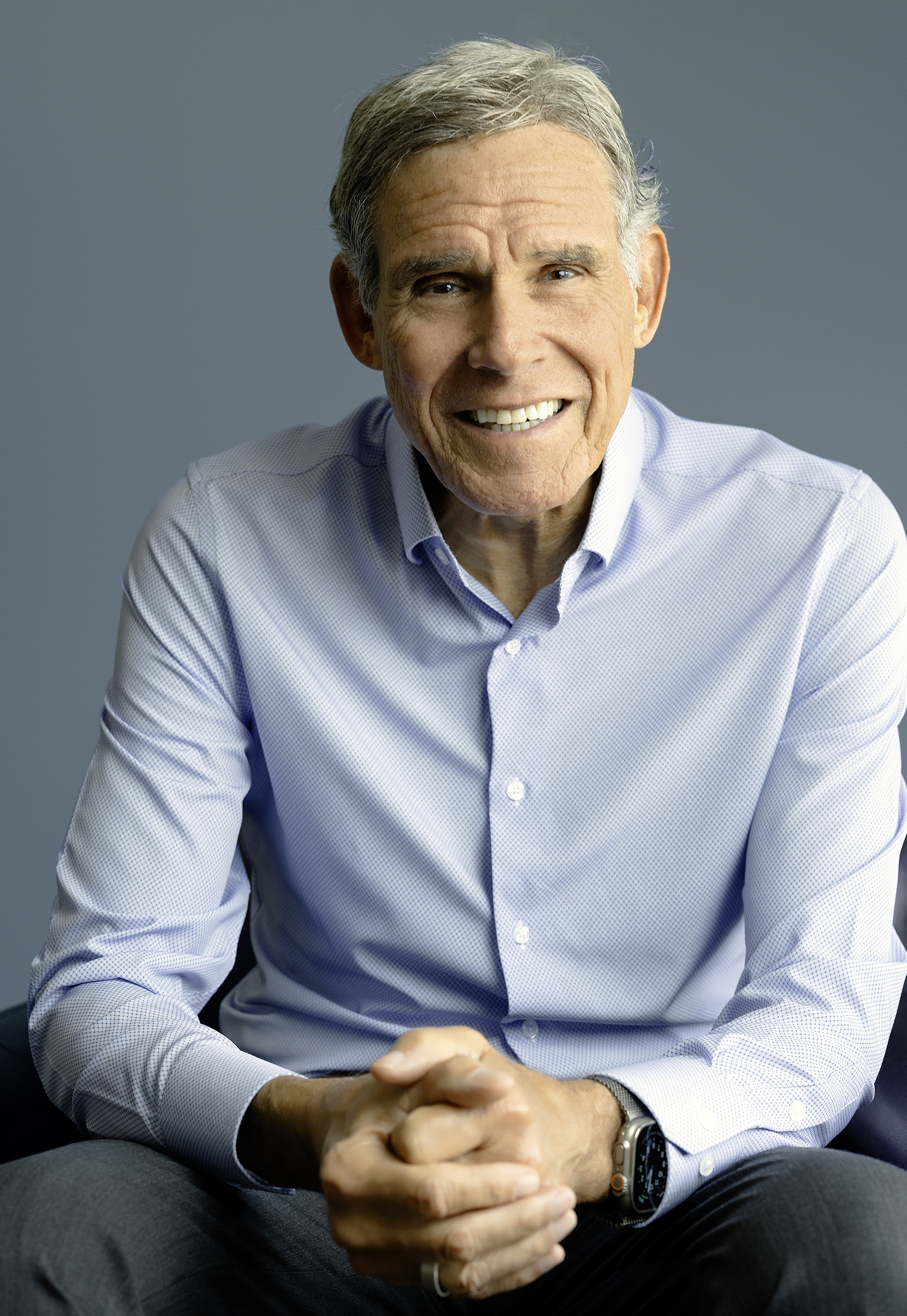
- Topol in 2026
- Born: June 26, 1954 (age 72)
- Education: University of Virginia (BA); University of Rochester (MD)
- Occupation: Cardiologist
- Website: drerictopol.com
- Academic career
- Fields: Genetics, cardiology
- Institutions: University of Michigan (1985–1991); Cleveland Clinic; Case Western Reserve University; Scripps Research

Eric Jeffrey Topol (born June 26, 1954) is an American cardiologist, scientist, and author. He is the founder and director of the Scripps Research Translational Institute, a professor of Molecular Medicine and Executive Vice-President at Scripps Research Institute, and a senior consultant at the Division of Cardiovascular Diseases at Scripps Clinic in La Jolla, California.

He has published four bestseller books on the future of medicine: The Creative Destruction of Medicine (2010); The Patient Will See You Now (2015); Deep Medicine: How Artificial Intelligence Can Make Healthcare Human Again (2019); and Super Agers: An Evidence-Based Approach to Longevity (2025).

He was commissioned by the UK from 2018 to 2019 to lead planning for the National Health Service's future workforce, integrating genomics, digital medicine, and artificial intelligence.

In 2016 Topol was awarded a $207 million grant from the National Institutes of Health to lead a significant part of the Precision Medicine Initiative (All of Us Research Program), a one-million-American prospective research program. This funding was renewed in 2023 for $282 million over five years.

This was in addition to his role as principal investigator for the Scripps hub of the National Institutes of Health’s Clinical and Translational Science Awards (CTSA) Program, aimed at promoting innovation in medicine and future medical researchers' education and career training.

Topol’s group has been supported by the CTSA since 2008, with the most recent funding of $46.8 million being awarded in 2023 for seven years.

== Early life and education ==
Topol was born on June 26, 1954. He graduated from the University of Virginia in 1975 with a Bachelor of Arts degree in biomedicine with highest distinction and from the University of Rochester School of Medicine in 1979 with a Doctor of Medicine degree. He then did a residency in internal medicine at the University of California, San Francisco from 1979 to 1982 and a fellowship in cardiology at Johns Hopkins University from 1982 to 1985.

== Research ==
As a researcher, Topol has published over 1,300 peer-reviewed articles, with more than 400,000 citations, 259 h-index, elected to the National Academy of Medicine, and is one of the top 10 most cited researchers in medicine. His principal scientific focus has been on the genomic and digital tools, with the use of artificial intelligence analytics, to individualize medicine. He also pioneered the development of many medications that are routinely used in medical practice including t-PA, Plavix, Angiomax, and ReoPro. He has led clinical trials in over 40 countries involving over 200,000 patients (first in series – GUSTO trials). He has edited over 30 books, including the Textbook of Interventional Cardiology (8th ed - Elsevier, 2020), and the Textbook of Cardiovascular Medicine (3rd ed - Lippincott Williams & Wilkins).

== Career ==
Topol was a tenured professor at the University of Michigan for 6 years. At age 36, Topol was named chairman of the Department of Cardiovascular Medicine at the Cleveland Clinic, where he is widely credited for leading its already long outstanding cardiovascular program to being ranked #1 by U.S. News & World Report for more than a decade during his 13 years at the helm. In 2002, he founded the Cleveland Clinic Lerner College of Medicine, the first new medical school in the US in 20 years, with its first class in 2004, and served as its provost and chief academic officer of the Cleveland Clinic. In 2003 he became a professor of genetics at Case Western Reserve University, while maintaining his primary appointment at Cleveland Clinic.

Topol departed from the Cleveland Clinic Lerner College of Medicine in 2006 following the removal of the chief academic officer position, and continued at Case Western Reserve University. He was then recruited by Scripps Health and The Scripps Research Institute in late 2006 to create a new institute, now called Scripps Research Translational, dedicated to individualized medicine. In 2009, Topol worked with Gary and Mary West to create the West Wireless Health Institute, now called West Health Institute, to foster the use of digital tools in medical research and practice.

== Artificial intelligence in the medical field ==
Following his groundbreaking book Deep Medicine, Topol has published multiple original research and review papers in leading peer reviewed journals on artificial intelligence (AI) in the medical field. In addition, he published a weekly update of all leading peer reviewed medical AI papers via Doctor Penguin, and frequently posts open-access essays on the latest in AI in medicine on his blog, Ground Truths. In 2023, he also presented a TED Talk on the transformative power of AI in medicine. His work on "high-performance medicine" that builds on this report was also published in Nature Medicine .

== Genetics and genomics ==
At the University of Virginia, Topol authored his baccalaureate thesis in 1975 entitled “Prospects for Genetic Therapy in Man” and received a Bachelor of Arts degree With Highest Distinction. During his fellowship at Johns Hopkins, he was involved with the first patient who was administered tissue plasminogen activator (t-PA) in 1984, a genetically engineered protein. In 1996, he started the first dedicated cardiovascular gene bank while at Cleveland Clinic. This effort led to many discoveries in the genetics of cardiovascular disease, including the identification of key genes associated with heart attacks. Both thrombospondin variants and the MEF2A deletion reports were recognized as top 10 advances by the American Heart Association in 2000 and 2004. He was the principal investigator of the National Institutes of Health's Specialized Centers of Clinically Oriented Research grant on the genomics of heart attack with a $17M award in 2005. His work in genetics has been recognized by the American College of Cardiology with the Simon Dack Award and Lecture in 2005 and by the European Society of Cardiology by the Andreas Gruentzig Award and Lecture in 2004.

== Digital medicine ==
Topol has been involved with digital medicine since its inception. He has been labeled as the "Dean of Digital Medicine." He was the first physician to serve on CardioNet's Medical Advisory Board in 1999, the first dedicated digital medicine company that performs real-time remote, continuous electrocardiogram rhythm monitoring. In 2007 he joined the Board of Sotera that has developed the first continuous non-invasive blood pressure monitoring device, which also captures all vital signs. In 2008 he forged a new educational program with Qualcomm and Scripps Health to train physicians in medicine, a 2-year clinician scholar program: STSI Health Scholar. At the 2009 International Wireless CTIA meeting, he gave the keynote address on digital health, the first time that topic was the subject of a CTIA plenary session. Also in 2009, he served as co-founder with Gary and Mary West to form the West Wireless Health Institute. He is the vice-chairman of the institute and its chief innovation officer. In 2009 he also presented at TEDMED the rapid progress being made in this field. In addition, in early 2010 Topol gave a digital medicine presentation at the Consumer Electronic Show. He led the first trial with the GE Vscan device according to GE Reports, a pocket high resolution, mobile ultrasound imaging device, introduced in the US in 2010. "The Doctor Will “e” You Now" and is currently leading clinical trials of heart rhythm and heart failure monitoring digital devices.

== National Health Service (NHS) - Topol Digital Fellowship ==
Topol was commissioned by Jeremy Hunt in 2018 to carry out a review of how the NHS workforce will need to change “to deliver a digital future”. His report suggested that within ten years most patients would be managing their own long-term conditions with wearable devices and sensors, and that that would be much more effective than occasional appointments with a doctor. Patients would not be monitored in hospitals but at home. This rise in regular monitoring would necessitate new workflows and frameworks in digital healthcare. More nursing and physician associates would be required, enabling doctors to focus on the most difficult cases. The report also recommended specific digital training for NHS staff and physicians.

== Vioxx ==
Topol served as chairman of cardiovascular medicine at Cleveland Clinic from 1991 to 2005. He was one of the first researchers to question the cardiovascular safety of rofecoxib (Vioxx), culminating in that drug's withdrawal from the market. Topol's advocacy on the subject led to what The New York Times described as an "unusually public dispute" with the Cleveland Clinic's leadership over ties between the academic institution and the pharmaceutical industry, ultimately leading to Topol's departure after his administrative position as head of their academic program was abolished.

In a 2004 editorial in The New York Times, he wrote that "Merck finally had to acknowledge the truth [about the drug's cardiovascular risks], but only by accident." Topol also authored an editorial in the New England Journal of Medicine, arguing that "neither Merck nor the FDA fulfilled its responsibilities to the public" and encouraging a "full congressional review" of the situation.

In 2004, Bethany McLean, writing in Fortune, questioned Topol's own potential financial conflicts of interest. She reported that Topol served as a scientific advisor to a hedge fund which profited substantially by short selling Merck stock, which plummeted due to the concerns about Vioxx which Topol had publicized. Topol denied giving the hedge fund advance information, and subsequently severed his ties to industry, donating all such income directly to charity. In a 2005 Journal of the American Medical Association commentary, Topol pointed to these allegations as an example of the complications that physicians can experience when associating with the investment industry, at the same time reiterating that "no true conflict of interest existed in this case."

In November 2005, Topol was subpoenaed in a class action lawsuit against Merck. He testified that Vioxx posed an "extraordinary risk", and that Raymond Gilmartin, former chief executive officer of Merck, had contacted the head of the Cleveland Clinic board to complain about Topol's work on Vioxx. Two days afterward, Topol was informed that the position as chief academic officer at the Cleveland Clinic had been abolished, and he was removed as provost of the Cleveland Clinic Lerner College of Medicine, which he had founded. The clinic described the timing as coincidental. The New York Times described Topol's demotion as part of an "unusually public dispute" between Topol and the Cleveland Clinic's chief executive, Delos Cosgrove, and stated that Topol's criticism of Merck had focused scrutiny and criticism on the clinic's deep and longstanding ties to the pharmaceutical and medical-device industries.

== COVID-19 ==
In August 2020, Topol published an open letter in Medscape to FDA Commissioner Stephen Hahn, criticizing his Emergency Use Authorizations of hydroxychloroquine, convalescent plasma, and remdesivir for COVID-19. Topol wrote, "These repeated breaches demonstrate your willingness to ignore the lack of scientific evidence, and to be complicit with the Trump Administration's politicization of America's healthcare institutions." Hahn had stated that he was prepared to authorize a vaccine before Phase 3 trials were completed, but Topol said that this would not allow the FDA to establish safety and efficacy, would jeopardize the vaccine program, and would betray the public trust. He called on Hahn to revise his statement or resign.

After conversations with Topol, Hahn retracted some of those claims. In September 2020, Hahn tightened up the rules for approving a vaccine, requiring a longer follow-up period, leading to criticism from Trump. Trump attacked Hahn in a tweet, saying that the rules should be loosened. Topol responded to the news writing, "We were on a path for a vaccine emergency authorization (EUA) before November 3rd. Thanks to the FDA, Trump's plan was disrupted. That won't happen." Some argue that this delayed the approval of the Pfizer vaccine by around a month, with the Phase 3 trial endpoints being met on November 8, 2020, 5 days after the presidential election.

== Honors ==
Topol was selected as one of the 12 “Rock Stars of Science” by GQ and the Geoffrey Beene Foundation in 2009. He was elected to the American Society for Clinical Investigation, the Association of American Physicians, and the Johns Hopkins Society of Scholars. In 2004, he was elected to the Institute of Medicine of the National Academy of Sciences. He was named Doctor of the Decade by the Institute for Scientific Information for being one of the top 10 most cited medical researchers. In 2011, Topol received the Hutchinson Medal from the University of Rochester in addition to giving the commencement speech for the School of Medicine and Dentistry. In 2012, Modern Healthcare ranked Topol as the most influential physician executive in the United States. In 2024, Topol was featured in the inaugural TIME100 Health list of most influential people in health in the world. In 2025, the U.S. News & World Report – Best Leaders recognized Topol among 25 individuals in the country who are making a significant impact in business, education, public health, and public service.

He, his 4 fellow authors and their 972 co-authors received the Ig Nobel Prize for literature in 1993 for "An International Randomized Trial Comparing Four Thrombolytic Strategies for Acute Myocardial Infarction", a medical paper that has one hundred times as many authors as pages.

== Personal life ==
He is married to Susan Merriman Topol with whom he has two children.

== Bibliography ==
- Topol, Eric J. Super Agers: An Evidence-Based Approach to Longevity, 2025 — ISBN 9781668067666
- Topol, Eric J. Deep Medicine, 2019 — ISBN 9781541644649
- Topol, Eric J., and Paul S. Teirstein. 1st edition, 1989; Textbook of Interventional Cardiology, 7th edition. Philadelphia, PA: Elsevier, 2015 — ISBN 9780323340380; 8th edition, 2019 — ISBN 9780323568142
- Topol, Eric. The Patient Will See You Now: The Future of Medicine Is in Your Hands. New York: Basic Books, 2015 — ISBN 9780465054749
- Topol, Eric. The Creative Destruction of Medicine: How the Digital Revolution Will Create Better Health Care. New York: Basic Books, 2012 — ISBN 9780465025503

== See also ==
- Exome sequencing
- Personal genomics
- Whole genome sequencing
