= Charon (horse) =

American-bred Thoroughbred racehorse

- Sire: Mo Exception
- Grandsire: Hard Work
- Dam: Double Wiggle
- Damsire: Sir Wiggle
- Sex: Filly
- Foaled: 1987
- Country: United States
- Colour: Chestnut
- Breeder: Triple E Farm
- Owner: Stanley M. Ersoff
- Trainer: Eugene Navarro
- Record: 16: 7-5-0
- Earnings: US$925,200

Major wins
- Black-Eyed Susan Stakes (1990); Coaching Club American Oaks (1990); Bonnie Miss Stakes (1990); Forward Gal Stakes (1990); Rampart Handicap (1991)
- Last updated on January 18, 2021

Charon (May 10, 1987 – April 12, 2009) was an American Thoroughbred racehorse who defeated both male and female competitors. She was bred at Triple E Farm in Ocala, Florida by owner Stanley M. Ersoff. She was a chestnut filly, a daughter of Mo Exception out of the mare Double Wiggle. She is best remembered for her seven and a half length romp in the Grade II $250,000 Black-Eyed Susan Stakes and her win in the Coaching Club American Oaks two months later.

== Early racing career ==
In 1990, Stanley M. Ersoff's homebred Charon proved to be the second best three-year-old in the country behind Champion Go For Wand during her three-year-old season. The year began with a big win in January in the Forward Gal Stakes at seven furlongs at Gulfstream Park. In March, she won the grade two Bonnie Miss Stakes (now called the Gulfstream Oaks) at a mile and one sixteenth in 1:44.60. In a short turnaround of two weeks, Charon was entered in the Ashland Stakes at Keeneland Race Course in Lexington, Kentucky. In that mile and one sixteenth race, she placed second to Go for Wand.

== Black-Eyed Susan Stakes ==
On the third Friday of May, the connections of Charon ran her in the de facto second jewel of the national "Filly Triple Crown," the Grade II $250,000 Black-Eyed Susan Stakes at Pimlico Race Course in Baltimore, Maryland. In that 66th running of the Black-Eyed Susan, Charon went off as the second favorite in a field of nine fillies. She took an awkward step at the break and started slowly under jockey Craig Perret. The Florida bred picked it up a bit down the backstretch but was still running in mid-pack. Around the final turn, Charon made a sweeping move wide around the field and within a sixteenth of a mile passed every one of her competitors. Down the lane, she continued to widen her stride and won going away by seven and a half lengths over Valay Maid and Bright Candles, who was trained by D. Wayne Lukas. She won the race in 1:48.40 and the winner's share of 60% of the purse, equaling $150,000. That win pushed her streak up to five wins in the last six races.

== Later racing career ==
In June 1990, Charon was entered in the Mother Goose Stakes at a mile and one sixteenth at Belmont Park. She lost to her arch-rival and soon to be named American Champion Three-Year-Old Filly, Go For Wand. Near the end of her three year-old season in late July, Charon won the grade one Coaching Club American Oaks at Belmont Park. She finished the mile and one quarter in 2:02-3/5 under jockey Craig Perret. In January 1991, the Eclipse Awards were held, and Charon came in second in the voting to Go For Wand. In the middle of March of her four-year-old season, Charon won the Johnny Walker Black Classic which is now the Rampart Handicap at a mile and one eighth at Gulfstream Park in Hallandale Beach, Florida.

== Broodmare record ==
Charon produced no major winners, but her Japanese-bred daughter Sibyl was the dam of Just A Way. Charon died on April 12, 2009, after delivering a stillborn foal by Heart's Cry.
