= Forward Gal Stakes =

- Class: Grade III
- Location: Gulfstream Park; Hallandale, Florida, United States
- Inaugurated: 1981
- Race type: Thoroughbred – Flat racing
- Website: Gulfstream Park

Race information
- Distance: 7 furlongs
- Surface: Dirt
- Track: left-handed
- Qualification: Three-year-old fillies
- Weight: 122 lbs. with allowances
- Purse: $175,000 (since 2026)
- Bonuses: Qualification points –Road to the Kentucky Oaks

The Forward Gal Stakes is a Grade III American Thoroughbred horse race for three-year-old fillies, over a distance of seven furlongs on the dirt held annually in late January or early February at Gulfstream Park in Hallandale Beach, Florida. The event currently carries a purse of $175,000.

== History ==
The race is named for Forward Gal, the American Champion Two-Year-Old Filly of 1970 and a career winner of twelve events in 26 starts.

The inaugural running of the event was on 12 February 1981 and was won by Hickory Tree Stable's Dame Mysterieuse by 1 1/4 lengths in a time of 1:22 1/5. Dame Mysterieuse starting as the 8/5 favorite was ridden by French-born jockey Jean-Luc Samyn and was trained by Hall of Fame trainer Woody Stephens. Woody Stephens also trained the second placegetter Heavenly Cause and the fourth place finisher Del La Rose in the race.

The following year, 1982, the event was run in split divisions.

The 1984 winner Miss Oceana began her three-year-old career in the event after winning three Grade I events as a two-year-old. Starting at short odds of 2/5on Miss Oceana breezed winning the race by three lengths in a time of 1:22 2/5 providing Woody Stephens with his third winner after only four runnings of the event.

The event was upgraded in 1986 by the American Graded Stakes Committee to Grade III race.

In the 1989 the event was won by Eugene V. Klein's Open Mind, the Breeders' Cup Juvenile Fillies winner from the year before and US Champion Two-Year-Old Filly. Trained by US Hall of Fame trainer D. Wayne Lukas and ridden by US Hall of Fame jockey Angel Cordero Jr., Open Mind won by two lengths, winning her third straight event. Open Mind would win seven more straight events including five Grade I events to be voted US Champion Three-Year-Old Filly for 1989.

The event was upgraded to Grade II classification in 1991 and was downgraded back to Grade III in 1997. In 1997, the 17th running of the event H. Joseph Allen's Glitter Woman ridden by US Hall of Fame jockey Mike E. Smith blitzed her rivals winning by a then record 9 3/4 lengths victory and setting a new stakes record time for the event in 1.21.76. The record stands to date, however the 2012 winner Broadway's Alibi created a new winning margin record thrashing her rivals by 16 3/4 lengths.

In 2004 the event was upgraded once again to Grade II and held the classification for fourteen runnings until 2017 when it was downgraded back to Grade III.

The event carries qualification points to the Kentucky Oaks as part of the Road to the Kentucky Oaks.

== Records ==
Speed record:

- 1:21.76 – Glitter Woman (1997)

Margins:

- 16 3/4 lengths – Broadway's Alibi (2012)

Most wins by an owner:

- 2 – Hickory Tree Stable (1981, 1982)
- 2 – Edward P. Evans (1991, 2001)
- 2 – Stonestreet Stables (2012, 2025)

Most wins by a jockey:

- 5 – Luis Saez (2017, 2021, 2022, 2023, 2025)

Most wins by a trainer:

- 4 – Todd A. Pletcher (2012, 2013, 2014, 2021)

== Winners ==
Year	Winner	Jockey	Trainer	Owner	Distance	Time	Purse	Grade	Ref
2026	On Time Girl	Irad Ortiz Jr.	Brad H. Cox	Albaugh Family Stables	7 furlongs	1:24.59	$150,000	III	
2025	Eclatant	Luis Saez	Brad H. Cox	Stonestreet Stables	7 furlongs	1:23.61	$155,000	III	
2024	R Harper Rose	Edgard Zayas	Saffie A. Joseph Jr.	Averill Racing & Two Eight Racing	7 furlongs	1:24.34	$145,000	III	
2023	Red Carpet Ready	Luis Saez	George R. Arnold II	Ashbrook Farm & Upland Flats Racing	7 furlongs	1:23.54	$125,000	III	
2022	Girl With a Dream	Luis Saez	Brad H. Cox	Jim Bakke & Gerald Isbister	7 furlongs	1:23.42	$100,000	III	
2021	Zaajel	Luis Saez	Todd A. Pletcher	Shadwell Stable	7 furlongs	1:24.72	$100,000	III	
2020	Tonalist's Shape	Irad Ortiz Jr.	Saffie A. Joseph Jr.	Slam Dunk Racing, Doug Branham & Legacy Ranch	7 furlongs	1:24.47	$150,000	III	
2019	Feedback	Irad Ortiz Jr.	Chad C. Brown	Klaravich Stables	7 furlongs	1:23.51	$150,000	III	
2018	Take Charge Paula	Paco Lopez	Kiaran P. McLaughlin	Peter Deutsch	7 furlongs	1:23.47	$200,000	III	
2017	Tequilita	Luis Saez	Michael R. Matz	Dorothy Alexander Matz	7 furlongs	1:24.36	$200,000	II	
2016	Cathryn Sophia	Joel Rosario	John C. Servis	Cash is King	7 furlongs	1:22.04	$200,000	II	
2015	Birdatthewire	Irad Ortiz Jr.	Dale L. Romans	Forum Racing	7 furlongs	1:24.92	$200,000	II	
2014	Onlyforyou	Javier Castellano	Todd A. Pletcher	Glencrest Farm (Lessee)	7 furlongs	1:22.50	$200,000	II	
2013	Kauai Katie	John R. Velazquez	Todd A. Pletcher	Stonestreet Stables	7 furlongs	1:22.13	$200,000	II	
2012	Broadway's Alibi	John R. Velazquez	Todd A. Pletcher	E. Paul Robsham	7 furlongs	1:21.94	$200,000	II	
2011	Pomeroys Pistol	Paco Lopez	Amy Tarrant	Hardacre Farm	7 furlongs	1:22.89	$200,000	II	
2010	Bickersons	Joe Bravo	Kelly J. Breen	Lori & George Hall	7 furlongs	1:22.35	$150,000	II	
2009	Frolic's Dream	Jermaine Bridgmohan	Martin D. Wolfson	Dare To Dream Farm	7 furlongs	1:24.15	$150,000	II	
2008	Bsharpsonata	Eric Camacho	Timothy E. Salzman	Cloverleaf Farm II	7 furlongs	1:23.09	$150,000	II	
2007	Forever Together	Elvis Trujillo	Jonathan E. Sheppard	Augustin Stable	7 furlongs	1:22.60	$150,000	II	
2006	Miraculous Miss	Jeremy Rose	Steve Klesaris	Puglisi Stables & Steve Klesaris	7 furlongs	1:22.78	$150,000	II	
2005	Letgomyecho	Javier Castellano	George R. Arnold II	Dixiana Farm	7 furlongs	1:23.24	$150,000	II	
2004	Madcap Escapade	Jerry D. Bailey	Frank L. Brothers	Bruce Lunsford	7 furlongs	1:22.97	$150,000	II	
2003	Midnight Cry	Edgar S. Prado	Kenneth G. McPeek	Barrister Hall Stables	7 furlongs	1:22.55	$100,000	III	
2002	Take the Cake	Rene R. Douglas	Carl A. Nafzger	Elizabeth J. Valando	7 furlongs	1:25.47	$100,000	III	
2001	Gold Mover	Jerry D. Bailey	Mark A. Hennig	Edward P. Evans	7 furlongs	1:22.43	$113,000	III	
2000	Miss Inquistive	Tommy Turner	Frank A. Passero Jr.	Colebrook Farms	7 furlongs	1:22.25	$75,000	III	
1999	China Storm	Pat Day	D. Wayne Lukas	Overbrook Farm	7 furlongs	1:23.69	$75,000	III	
1998	Uanme	Shane Sellers	Dallas Stewart	Horton Stable	7 furlongs	1:24.56	$75,000	III	
1997	Glitter Woman	Mike E. Smith	Claude R. McGaughey III	H. Joseph Allen	7 furlongs	1:21.76	$75,000	III	
1996	Mindy Gayle	Julie Krone	Julian Canet	Harvey Tenenbaum	7 furlongs	1:24.54	$75,000	II	
1995	Chaposa Springs	Heberto Castillo Jr.	Martin D. Wolfson	Suresh Chintamaneni	7 furlongs	1:24.18	$73,100	II	
1994	Mynameispanama	Marco Castaneda	Odin J. Londono Sr.	A. Garcia-de-Parades & Jorge Ameglio	7 furlongs	1:22.97	$72,600	II	
1993	Sum Runner	Randy Romero	Donald R. Winfree	S Solon Cohen Stables	7 furlongs	1:23.67	$74,850	II	
1992	Spinning Round	Jose A. Santos	James E. Baker	Kinsman Stable	7 furlongs	1:24.85	$73,050	II	
1991	Withallprobability	Craig Perret	D. Wayne Lukas	Edward P. Evans	7 furlongs	1:22.50	$79,650	II	
1990	Charon	Earlie Fires	Eugene Navarro	Stanley Ersoff	7 furlongs	1:24.80	$60,300	III	
1989	Open Mind	Angel Cordero Jr.	D. Wayne Lukas	Eugene V. Klein	7 furlongs	1:24.20	$61,300	III	
1988	On To Royalty	Craig Perret	Benjamin W. Perkins Jr.	Benjamin W. Perkins Jr. & Neil Litten	7 furlongs	1:23.20	$61,700	III	
1987	Added Elegance	Jacinto Vasquez	Frank Gomez	Wimborne Farm	7 furlongs	1:24.60	$67,700	III	
1986	Noranc	Herb McCauley	Joseph Provost	Peter Rosbeck & Jack Roberts	7 furlongs	1:23.80	$60,000	III	
1985	Lucy Manette	Craig Perret	J. Willard Thompson	William M. Hackman	7 furlongs	1:23.40	$66,150		
1984	Miss Oceana	Eddie Maple	Woodford C. Stephens	Newstead Farm	7 furlongs	1:22.40	$40,180		
1983	Unaccompanied	Robert Woodhouse	Dennis W. Ebert	Ben P. Walden & Wells P. Hardesty	7 furlongs	1:23.40	$47,005		
1982	Trove	Larry Saumell	Woodford C. Stephens	Hickory Tree Stable	7 furlongs	1:22.80	$29,712		Division 1
1982	All Manners	Odin J. Londono	Duke Davis	Mrs. Rosemary Bailey	7 furlongs	1:23.00	$29,962		Division 2
1981	Dame Mysterieuse	Jean-Luc Samyn	Woodford C. Stephens	Hickory Tree Stable	7 furlongs	1:22.20	$43,400		

== See also ==
- List of American and Canadian Graded races
- Forward Gal Stakes top three finishers
- Road to the Kentucky Oaks
