= Davona Dale Stakes top three finishers and starters =

This is a listing of the horses that finished in either first, second, or third place and the number of starters in the Davona Dale Stakes, an American Grade 2 race for three-year-old fillies at 9 furlongs (5,900 ft; 1,800 m) on dirt held at Gulfstream Park in Hallandale Beach, Florida. (List 1988-present)

Year	Winner	Second	Third	Starters
2015	Ekati's Phaeton	Birdatthewire	Eskenformoney	14
2014	Onlyforyou	House Rules	Aurelia's Belle	?
2013	Live Lively	Dreaming of Julia	Private Ensign	?
2012	Yara	Grace Hall	Captivating Lass	9
2011	R Heat Lightning	Dancinginherdreams	Pomeroys Pistol	8
2010	Amen Hallelujah	Joanie's Catch	Mambo Fever	8
2009	Justwhistledixie	Casanova Move	Frolic's Dream	8
2008	Bsharpsonata	Game Face	Robbie's Gal	6
2007	Christmas Kid	High Again	Lisa M.	8
2006	Wait a While	Teammate	Wonder Lady Anne L.	7
2005	Sis City	In the Gold	Jill Robin L.	6
2004	Miss Coronado	Eye Dazzler	Society Selection	7
2003	Yell	Ivanavinalot	Gold Player	5
2002	Ms. Brookski	Colonial Glitter	French Satin	9
2001	Latour	Gold Mover	Courageous Maiden	7
2000	Cash Run	Regally Appealing	Secret Status	9
1999	Three Ring	Golden Temper	Gold From the West	5
1998	Diamond On the Run	Uanme	Dixie Melody	10
1997	Glitter Woman	City Band	Southern Playboy	6
1996	Plum Country	My Flag	La Rosa	9
1995	Mia's Hope	Minister Wife	Culver City	6
1994	Cut the Charm	She Rides Tonite	Delightful Bet	8
1993	Lunar Spook	Boot 'n Jackie	In Her Glory	7
1992	Miss Legality	November Snow	Spectacular Sue	8
1991	Fancy Ribbons	Hula Pride	Designated Dancer	9
1990	Big Pride	Crowned	Sonic Gray	6
1989	Waggley	Plate Queen	Ataentsic	7
1988 #	Charming Tigress	Polar Wind	No Doublet	8
1988 #	Cadillacing	Easter Mary	Saucey Missy	9

A # indicates that the race was run in two divisions in 1988.
