= New Year's Day (horse) =

American-bred Thoroughbred racehorse

- Sire: Street Cry
- Grandsire: Machiavellian
- Dam: Justwhistledixie
- Damsire: Dixie Union
- Sex: Stallion
- Foaled: 2011
- Country: United States
- Colour: Bay
- Breeder: Clearsky Farms
- Owner: Mary & Gary West
- Trainer: Bob Baffert
- Record: 3: 2-0-1
- Earnings: $1,154,000

Major wins
- Breeders' Cup Juvenile (2013)

New Year's Day (foaled April 22, 2011) is an American Thoroughbred racehorse and breeding stallion. Racing only as a two-year-old he won two of his three races including the Breeders' Cup Juvenile. His career was ended by injury in December 2013 and he was retired to stud.

== Background ==
New Year's Day is a bay horse with a narrow white stripe bred in Kentucky by Clearsky Farms. He was sired by the Irish-bred stallion Street Cry, who was the winner of the Dubai World Cup in 2002 before becoming a very successful breeding stallion. His other offspring have included Zenyatta, Winx, Street Sense, Whobegotyou and Shocking. New Year's Day's was the first foal of his dam Justwhistledixie, a high-class racemare who won the Grade II Davona Dale Stakes and finished second in the Acorn Stakes in 2009. As a descendant of the broodmare Bold Irish, Justwhistledixie came from the same branch of Thoroughbred family 8-c which also produced Ruffian, Pine Bluff and Fusaichi Pegasus.

In September 2012, the yearling colt was consigned to the Keeneland sales where he was bought for $425,000 by Ben Glass. The colt entered the ownership of Mary & Gary West and was sent into training with Bob Baffert.

== Racing career ==
=== 2013: two-year-old season ===
On his racecourse debut, New Year's Day ran in a five and a half furlong maiden race on the Polytrack surface at Del Mar on August 18, 2013. Ridden by Garrett Gomez, he started at odds of 4/1 in a field of nine runners. After racing towards the rear of the field he moved up on the outside entering the straight and finished third behind Indexical and Hi Fashioned. Two weeks later at the same track, New Year's Day contested another maiden race, this time over a distance of one mile and started the 0.9/1 favorite against eight opponents. Gomez tracked the leader Carson's Ten in the early stages before sending his mount into the lead two furlongs from the finish. New Year's Day went clear of the field in the straight and won by one and three quarter lengths from Bond Holder with a gap of three and a quarter lengths back to Cautious Giant in third.

New Year's Day was then moved up sharply in class to contest the thirtieth running of the Breeders' Cup Juvenile over eight and a half furlongs at Santa Anita Park on November 2 in which he was ridden by Martin Garcia. The Champagne Stakes winner Havana was made the 3/1 favorite ahead of Tap It Rich the more fancied of the runners from the Baffert stable with New Year's Day next in the betting on 8/1 alongside Bond Holder. The other contenders included the Hopeful Stakes winner Strong Mandate and the Breeders' Futurity Stakes winner We Miss Artie. A very strong pace was set by Conquest Titan, Rum Point and Strong Mandate, with New Year's Day settled behind the leading group on the inside. As the field entered the straight, Havana gained the advantage from Strong Mandate but Garcia produced New Year's Day with a strong late run along the inside rail to take the lead in the closing stages and won going away by one and a quarter lengths. Havana took second ahead of Strong Mandate, Bond Holder and Tap It Rich. Explaining his tactics, Garcia said My horse doesn't have that much pace. I was exactly where I wanted to be. The rail was open and I took it; I didn't panic". Baffert, who was winning the race for the third time after Vindication in 2002 and Midshipman in 2008 said "He showed us a lot in his two races at Del Mar and he's been showing us a lot here in the morning. He's been telling us in the mornings that he's ready."

In late December New Year's Day sustained a training injury described as a "non-displaced chip on the left hind sesamoid". On 26 December it was announced that the colt would be retired from racing and would begin his stud career Hill 'n' Dale Farms in Lexington, Kentucky. His owners' agent Ben Glass said We don't know what happened—whether he kicked himself coming off the track, or what. "It was going to be a long layoff, regardless of what we did, so [we] decided it would be in the best interest of the horse to retire him. Bob said he didn't want to have to hold his breath every time he breezed him. We would like to win more races with him but that's not in the cards. Disappointed isn't the right word for it."

== Assessment and awards ==
New Year's Day was runner-up to the gelding Shared Belief in the poll for American Champion Two-Year-Old Male Horse. In the Experimental Free Handicap he was rated the best American two-year-old of 2013, with a weight of 126 pounds.

== Stud career ==
New Year's Day began his stud career at Hill 'n' Dale Farms in Kentucky at a fee of $12,500 for a live foal.

On July 15, 2017, New Year's Day was represented by his first winner, a bay filly named Special Portion. On her racing debut, Special Portion (out of Awesomeatthetrack, by Awesome Again) won by 2 1/2 lengths at Arapahoe Park. In 2016 he sired multiple G1 winner, Maximum Security. Maximum Security won the 2019 Kentucky Derby before being DQed. Prior to Maximum Security's emergence as a G1 winner, in late 2018, New Year's Day was sold to Brazilian interests to stand future seasons in that country. However, following the success of Maximum Security, he was subsequently sold to Japanese interests by that Brazilian owner. He is expected to stand his first season in Japan in 2020.

== Pedigree ==
Pedigree of New Year's Day (USA), bay colt, 2011
Sire Street Cry (IRE) 1998	Machiavellian (USA); 1987	Mr. Prospector	Raise a Native
Sire Street Cry (IRE) 1998	Machiavellian (USA); 1987	Mr. Prospector	Gold Digger
Sire Street Cry (IRE) 1998	Machiavellian (USA); 1987	Coup de Folie	Halo
Sire Street Cry (IRE) 1998	Machiavellian (USA); 1987	Coup de Folie	Raise The Standard
Sire Street Cry (IRE) 1998	Helen Street (GB); 1982	Troy	Petingo
Sire Street Cry (IRE) 1998	Helen Street (GB); 1982	Troy	La Milo
Sire Street Cry (IRE) 1998	Helen Street (GB); 1982	Waterway	Riverman
Sire Street Cry (IRE) 1998	Helen Street (GB); 1982	Waterway	Boulevard
Dam Justwhistledixie (USA) 2006	Dixie Union (USA); 1997	Dixieland Band	Northern Dancer
Dam Justwhistledixie (USA) 2006	Dixie Union (USA); 1997	Dixieland Band	Mississippi Mud
Dam Justwhistledixie (USA) 2006	Dixie Union (USA); 1997	She's Tops	Capote
Dam Justwhistledixie (USA) 2006	Dixie Union (USA); 1997	She's Tops	She's A Talent
Dam Justwhistledixie (USA) 2006	General Jeanne (USA); 1999	Honour and Glory	Relaunch
Dam Justwhistledixie (USA) 2006	General Jeanne (USA); 1999	Honour and Glory	Fair To All
Dam Justwhistledixie (USA) 2006	General Jeanne (USA); 1999	Ahpo Hel	Mr Leader
Dam Justwhistledixie (USA) 2006	General Jeanne (USA); 1999	Ahpo Hel	Tiy (Family:8-c)
