= Edward P. Evans Hall =

Building in New Haven, Connecticut, United States

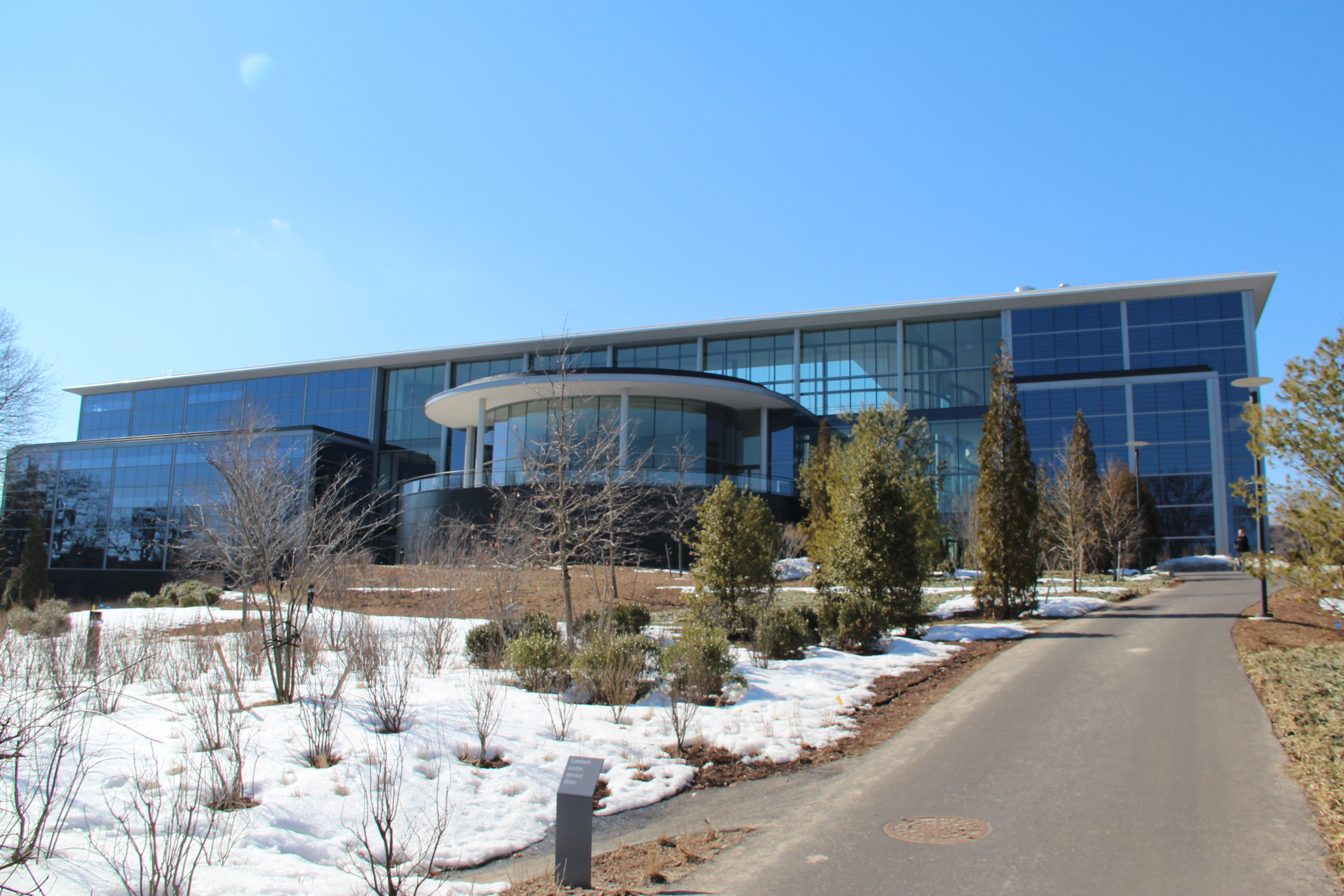
- Interactive map of the Edward P. Evans Hall area

General information
- Location: 165 Whitney Avenue, New Haven, Connecticut, United States
- Coordinates: 41.3152°N 72.9202°W
- Completed: 2014
- Inaugurated: January 2014
- Cost: $189 million
- Owner: Yale University

Height
- Height: 15.09 metres (49.5 ft)

Technical details
- Floor count: 6

Design and construction
- Architect: Foster and Partners

Edward P. Evans Hall is the main building of the Yale School of Management at Yale University in New Haven, Connecticut, U.S. Designed by Foster and Partners, it was named for alumnus Edward P. Evans, and completed in 2013. It is known for its architectural design and the high quality of the artwork onsite.

== History ==
On September 18, 2007, Yale President Richard C. Levin announced that the architectural firm of Foster + Partners, Inc. had been selected to design the new Yale School of Management campus. At 230,000 square feet, the building was expected to more than double the approximately 110,000 square feet of available School of Management space. Levin expressed his hope that the School of Management would “continue to attract and educate leaders of business and society for generations to come.”

The forthcoming association of world-renowned architect Norman Foster was presented as a major coup. Previous Foster designs had included Wembley Stadium and the Millennium Bridge in London, the Hearst Tower in New York, the Bundestag in Berlin, and the Millau Viaduct in southern France.

On April 26, 2011, a groundbreaking ceremony was held on the future site of the building. Sharon Oster, dean of the Yale School of Management at the time, said, "More than 30 years ago, the Yale Corporation voted to create a management school worthy of the Yale name, its deep intellectual roots, and sense of service. We've worked hard these past years to fulfill that promise. This new campus will help us do that." The architect of record was cited as Gruzen Samton LLP.

The building is named after Yale graduate Edward P. Evans, commonly called Ned Evans, who donated $50 million toward the project before his death in December 2010. Evans said: "I am delighted to make this gift that will bring together the Yale School of Management on a beautiful new campus, enlarge its student body, and propel it to the highest level in the 21st century." Evans was CEO of publishing house Macmillan from 1979 to 1989.

The building was completed in 2013. Construction costs reportedly totalled $189 million. The four-story building with an enclosed courtyard includes classrooms, offices, and student and meeting spaces. The building was dedicated in January 2014.

== Construction ==
The materials required for the construction of the building include 4 million pounds of steel, 16.2 million pounds of concrete, 2.25 million pounds of glass for the exterior façade, 123 miles of copper wire, and 500 doors. It incorporated "green construction" materials and practices.

== Amenities ==
Primary attractions of the building include the 350-seat Zhang Lei Auditorium, the Wilbur L. Ross Library, 16 state-of-the-art classrooms, a student gym, a dining commons/coffee shop, and the Beinecke Terrace Room, an entertainment space with an outdoor terrace providing views of landscaped gardens at the rear of the campus. The facility’s large-scale classrooms include the Blumetti Classroom, the Class of 1980 Classroom, the Bewkes Classroom, the Betts Classroom, the Qian and Yu Classroom, the Gambhir Classroom, and the Farr Classroom.

The Bekenstein Atrium features a site-specific artwork by Swiss artist Adrian Schiess. Scheiss’s installation includes 90 panels that appear to change color as visitors move throughout the space. In the Donaldson Dean’s Suite one will find “And Much, Much More!,” a witty artwork by Yale School of Art graduate Amy Pryor that portrays a collage in the shape of a bar graph representing US GDP from 1980 to 2010. The building also houses three “wall drawings” by noted Connecticut-born artist Sol LeWitt.

== Architectural significance ==
The building was designed by Foster and Partners.

In ARCHITECT: The Magazine of the American Institute of Architects, the official magazine of the American Institute of Architects, Thomas de Monchaux noted "each area between the elliptical classrooms and curved glazing features lively gatherings on banana-shaped furnishings—evoking something between a conversation pit and an airport gate".

In the Architects' Journal, Ellis Woodman wrote that "Evans Hall's language of full-height, circular, hollow-section columns ranged in front of an expanse of glazing hardly represents a departure for the practice".

Both Woodman and de Monchaux compared the building to the Carré d'Art in Nîmes, France, also designed by Foster and Partners.

== Environmental impact ==
The Yale School of Management endeavored to erect and maintain a building with a modest ecological footprint. In 2018 Evans Hall received a Gold rating under the U.S. Green Building Council’s Leadership in Energy and Environmental Design (LEED) program. The building was cited for excellence in energy efficiency, indoor environmental quality, selection of building materials, and water efficiency. Additionally, the site features covered parking for 104 bicycles and seven electric vehicle charging stations.

Due to Evans Hall's glass-intense design, bird window collisions became an immediate problem. Data collected at Evans Hall by Yale University affiliates suggests that an average of three birds per day struck the hall's windows in spring 2014. Since then, efforts have been underway to record and study bird mortality caused by Evans Hall, with a major report published in October 2020.

According to the report, 262 birds of at least 47 species were found stunned, injured, or dead due to window strikes at Evans Hall from April 2018 to mid-October 2020, including at least 18 birds of conservation concern. This data was gathered through a combination of informal carcass surveys and citizen science data. Given likely undercounts due to scavengers and delayed mortality, it is conservative to estimate that the building has killed over 700 birds since it opened in January 2014. At least 17 birds were species of conservation concern. For example, the building killed 12 Northern Parulas, a species of special concern under Connecticut’s Endangered Species Act. A rare Bicknell’s Thrush, a species IUCN-listed as “vulnerable” and of highest conservation priority, was also killed. It was the first Bicknell’s Thrush added to the Peabody Museum of Natural History’s collection since 1975.
