= Gulfstream Park Oaks =

- Class: Grade II
- Location: Gulfstream Park; Hallandale Beach, Florida, United States
- Inaugurated: 1971 (as Bonnie Miss Allowance Stakes)
- Race type: Thoroughbred – Flat racing
- Website: www.gulfstreampark.com

Race information
- Distance: 1 1/16 miles
- Surface: Dirt
- Track: left-handed
- Qualification: Three-year-old fillies
- Weight: 122 lbs
- Purse: US$250,000 (since 2022)

The Gulfstream Park Oaks is a Grade II American Thoroughbred horse race for three year old fillies, over a distance of one and one-eighth miles on the dirt held annually in March at Gulfstream Park, Hallandale Beach, Florida. The event currently carries a purse of $250,000.

== History ==
The inaugural running of the event was on 7 April 1971 as The Bonnie Miss Allowance with the conditions to accommodate fillies and mares three-years-old and older who had never won a sweepstakes at a mile or over with it being run on the turf at the about 1 1/16 miles distance. The first running was won by Able Jan who was ridden by Bobby Breen and trained for owner, True Davis Jr. by future Hall of Fame inductee, Horatio Luro. The event was named after Bonnie Donn Jones, daughter of James Donn Jr., president of Gulfstream Park from 1961 to 1978.

In 1972 and 1974 the Bonnie Miss Stakes was run for three year old fillies over a distance of seven furlongs. The event was run in two divisions in 1975 on the turf. Jockey Marco Castaneda won both races, setting a stakes record of 1:42 flat for 1 1/16 miles in the second division aboard Diomedia. The 1976 running of the event as a handicap for fillies and mares, was the last time it would be held on the turf.

Between 1977 and 1980 the event was held over a distance of seven furlongs. The 1979 running was held as a non-wagering exhibition event after the race had four acceptances with Candy Eclair the seven start winner an overwhelming favorite after defeating Davona Dale in the Shirley Jones Handicap. Davona Dale turned the tables and won another seven events, including the Triple Tiara of Thoroughbred Racing and being crowned U.S. Champion Three-Year-Old Filly.

In 1981 the distance of the event was increased to 1 1/16 miles. In 1982 the event was upgraded to Grade III and in 1988 once more to Grade II.

In 2011 the event was renamed to the Gulfstream Oaks and since 2015 has been run as the Gulfstream Park Oaks.

The event has been a prep race to the Triple Tiara of Thoroughbred Racing, including the Kentucky Oaks, the Black-Eyed Susan Stakes and Mother Goose Stakes.

== Records ==
Speed record:

- 1 1/8 miles – 1:48.25 Teammate (2006)
- 1 1/16 miles – 1:42.00 Diomedia (1975)
- 7 furlongs – 1:21.00 Davona Dale (1979)

Margins:

- 21 3/4 lengths – Dreaming of Julia (2013)

Most wins by a jockey:

- 5 – John Velazquez (1999, 2003, 2010, 2011, 2013)
- 5 – Jerry D. Bailey (1993, 1996, 2000, 2001, 2005)

Most wins by a trainer:

- 5 – Claude R. McGaughey III (1993, 1994, 1996, 1997, 2022)

Most wins by an owner:

- 2 – Barry K. Schwartz (1986, 1999)
- 2 – Edward P. Evans (1991, 2001)
- 2 – Ogden Mills Phipps (1993, 1994)
- 2 – H. Joseph Allen (1997, 2006)
- 2 – West Point Thoroughbreds (2009, 2018)

== Winners ==
Year	Winner	Age	Jockey	Trainer	Owner	Distance	Time	Purse	Grade	Ref
Gulfstream Park Oaks
2026	Prom Queen	3	Javier Castellano	Brad H. Cox	Gary & Mary West	1 1/16 miles	1:44.40	$265,000	II	
2025	Five G	3	Manuel Franco	Georage Weaver	Gatsas Stables	1 1/16 miles	1:43.22	$250,000	II	
2024	Power Squeeze	3	Daniel Centeno	Jorge Delgado	Lea Farms	1 1/16 miles	1:44.19	$250,000	II	
2023	Affirmative Lady	3	Luis Saez	H. Graham Motion	AMO Racing USA	1 1/16 miles	1:44.69	$255,000	II	
2022	Kathleen O.	3	Javier Castellano	Claude R. McGaughey III	Winngate Stables	1 1/16 miles	1:43.75	$250,000	II	
2021	Crazy Beautiful	3	Jose Ortiz	Kenneth G. McPeek	Phoenix Thoroughbred III	1 1/16 miles	1:44.41	$200,000	II	
2020	Swiss Skydiver	3	Paco Lopez	Kenneth G. McPeek	Peter Callahan	1 1/16 miles	1:43.54	$200,000	II	
2019	Champagne Anyone	3	Chris Landeros	Ian R. Wilkes	Six Column Stables & Randall L. Bloch	1 1/16 miles	1:43.47	$250,000	II	
2018	Coach Rocks	3	Luis Saez	Dale L. Romans	Roddy J. Valente, RAP Racing & West Point Thoroughbreds	1 1/16 miles	1:44.63	$250,000	II	
2017	Salty	3	Joel Rosario	Mark E. Casse	Gary Barber, Baccari Racing Stable & Chester Prince	1 1/16 miles	1:42.91	$250,000	II	
2016	Go Maggie Go	3	Luis Saez	Dale L. Romans	Mike Tarp	1 1/16 miles	1:43.74	$250,000	II	
2015	Birdatthewire	3	Irad Ortiz Jr.	Dale L. Romans	Forum Racing	1 1/16 miles	1:47.40	$250,000	II	
Gulfstream Oaks
2014	In Tune	3	Javier Castellano	Todd A. Pletcher	Wertheimer et Frère	1 1/8 miles	1:50.19	$300,000	II	
2013	Dreaming of Julia	3	John R. Velazquez	Todd A. Pletcher	Stonestreet Stables	1 1/8 miles	1:48.97	$300,000	II	
2012	Grace Hall	3	Javier Castellano	Anthony W. Dutrow	Michael Dub, Bethlehem Stables & The Elkstone Group	1 1/8 miles	1:49.36	$300,000	II	
2011	R Heat Lightning	3	John R. Velazquez	Todd A. Pletcher	E. Paul Robsham Stables	1 1/8 miles	1:49.27	$300,000	II	
Bonnie Miss Stakes
2010	Devil May Care	3	John R. Velazquez	Todd A. Pletcher	Glencrest Farm	1 1/8 miles	1:49.06	$200,000	II	
2009	Justwhistledixie	3	Julien R. Leparoux	Kiaran P. McLaughlin	West Point Thoroughbreds, Lakland Farm & Randall D. Hubbard	1 1/8 miles	1:49.25	$200,000	II	
2008	Shes All Eltish	3	Eddie Castro	Martin D. Wolfson	Denholtz Stables	1 1/8 miles	1:51.80	$150,000	II	
2007	High Again	3	Cornelio Velasquez	William I. Mott	Zayat Stables	1 1/8 miles	1:50.87	$150,000	II	
2006	Teammate	3	Cornelio Velasquez	H. Allen Jerkens	H. Joseph Allen	1 1/8 miles	1:48.25	$150,000	II	
2005	Jill Robin L	3	Jerry D. Bailey	Robert L. Levine	Robert Braunsdorf & Robert L. Levine	1 1/8 miles	1:53.12	$150,000	II	
2004	Last Song	3	Edgar S. Prado	Carl A. Nafzger	Buckram Oak Farm	1 1/8 miles	1:50.60	$200,000	II	
2003	Ivanavinalot	3	John R. Velazquez	Kathleen O'Connell	Gilbert G. Campbell	1 1/8 miles	1:50.72	$200,000	II	
2002	Dust Me Off	3	Mark Guidry	H. Allen Jerkens	Cynthia Knight	1 1/8 miles	1:49.67	$250,000	II	
2001	Tap Dance	3	Jerry D. Bailey	Mark A. Hennig	Edward P. Evans	1 1/8 miles	1:52.05	$250,000	II	
2000	Cash Run	3	Jerry D. Bailey	D. Wayne Lukas	Padua Stable (Satish Sanan)	1 1/16 miles	1:44.11	$200,000	II	
1999	Three Ring	3	John R. Velazquez	Edward Plesa Jr.	Barry K. Schwartz	1 1/16 miles	1:43.75	$200,000	II	
1998	Banshee Breeze	3	Randy Romero	Carl A. Nafzger	James B. Tafel	1 1/16 miles	1:46.57	$200,000	II	
1997	Glitter Woman	3	Mike E. Smith	Claude R. McGaughey III	H. Joseph Allen	1 1/16 miles	1:43.25	$200,000	II	
1996	My Flag	3	Jerry D. Bailey	Claude R. McGaughey III	Ogden Phipps	1 1/16 miles	1:45.77	$200,000	II	
1995	Mia's Hope	3	Kristi L. Chapman	Harold J. Rose	Harold J. Rose	1 1/16 miles	1:44.85	$200,000	II	
1994	Inside Information	3	Mike E. Smith	Claude R. McGaughey III	Ogden Mills Phipps	1 1/16 miles	1:42.94	$200,000	II	
1993	Dispute	3	Jerry D. Bailey	Claude R. McGaughey III	Ogden Mills Phipps	1 1/16 miles	1:43.67	$200,000	II	
1992	Spectacular Sue	3	Wigberto S. Ramos	Jose A. Mendez	Fran Gilardi	1 1/16 miles	1:44.14	$200,000	II	
1991	Withallprobability	3	Craig Perret	D. Wayne Lukas	Edward P. Evans	1 1/16 miles	1:43.30	$200,000	II	
1990	Charon	3	Earlie Fires	Eugene Navarro	Stanley M. Ersoff	1 1/16 miles	1:44.60	$200,000	II	
1989	Open Mind	3	Angel Cordero Jr.	D. Wayne Lukas	Eugene V. Klein	1 1/16 miles	1:43.80	$200,000	II	
1988	On To Royalty	3	Craig Perret	Benjamin W. Perkins Jr.	Benjamin W. Perkins Sr. & Anthony Tornetta	1 1/16 miles	1:45.60	$200,000	II	
1987	Mar Mar	3	Walter Guerra	Duke Davis	Benjamin Ossman	1 1/16 miles	1:44.60	$150,000	III	
1986	Patricia J. K.	3	Jose A. Santos	Bruce N. Levine	Barry K. Schwartz	1 1/16 miles	1:45.20	$212,450	III	
1985	Lucy Manette	3	Craig Perret	J. Willard Thompson	William M. Hackman	1 1/16 miles	1:44.80	$137,000	III	
1984	Miss Oceana	3	Eddie Maple	Woodford C. Stephens	Newstead Farm	1 1/16 miles	1:42.20	$90,675	III	
1983	Unaccompanied	3	Robert Woodhouse	Dennis W. Ebert	Ben Walden & Wells Hardesty	1 1/16 miles	1:45.40	$97,200	III	
1982	Christmas Past	3	Jacinto Vasquez	Angel A. Penna Jr.	Cynthia Phipps	1 1/16 miles	1:44.20	$58,050	III	
1981	Dame Mysterieuse	3	Jean-Luc Samyn	Woodford C. Stephens	Hickory Tree Stable	1 1/16 miles	1:44.40	$87,225		
1980	Lien	3	Eddie Maple	Patrick J. Kelly	Live Oak Racing	7 furlongs	1:22.00	$30,850		
1979	†Davona Dale	3	Jorge Velasquez	John M. Veitch	Calumet Farm	7 furlongs	1:21:00	$27,850		
1978	Jevalin	3	Mickey Solomone	Anthony Arcodia	Andrew Capeletti	7 furlongs	1:23.80	$31,000		
1977	Herecomesthebride	3	Larry Saumell	Jimmy Croll	Mrs. Rachel Carpenter & Mrs. Warren A. Croll	7 furlongs	1:21.80	$34,950		
Bonnie Miss Handicap
1976	Get Swinging	5	Alberto Ramos	Charles P. Sanborn	Orangebrook Stable	1 1/16 miles	1:44.40	$29,000		
Bonnie Miss Allowance Stakes
1975	Cheers Marion	4	Marco Castaneda	Melvin C. Calvert	Frances A. Genter	1 1/16 miles	1:42.20	$17,012		Division 1
1975	Diomedia	4	Marco Castaneda	Moody Jolley	Bertram R. Firestone	1 1/16 miles	1:42.00	$17,112		Division 2
Bonnie Miss Stakes
1974	City Girl	3	Eddie Maple	Frank Catrone	Ada L. Rice	7 furlongs	1:22.60	$35,900		
1973	Fun Palace	4	Earlie Fires	George T. Poole	Cornelius Vanderbilt Whitney	1 1/16 miles	1:44.40	$23,575		Off turf
1972	Candid Catherine	3	Jacinto Vásquez	Everett W. King	Mrs. Lloyd I. Miller	7 furlongs	1:23.20	$35,250		
Bonnie Miss Allowance Stakes
1971	Able Jan	5	Bobby Breen	Horatio Luro	True Davis Jr.	abt. 1 1/16 miles	1:45.20	$16,725		

Legend:
Dirt Turf
Notes:
† The 1979 running attracted only four acceptances with Davona Dale and undefeated Candy Eclair overwhelming favorites the Gulfstream Park administration decide that the event was to be run as a non-betting exhibition race.

== See also ==
- Road to the Kentucky Oaks
- List of American and Canadian Graded races
