= Onlyforyou (horse) =

American-bred Thoroughbred racehorse

- Sire: Malibu Moon
- Grandsire: A.P. Indy
- Dam: Erhu
- Damsire: Tactical Cat
- Sex: Mare
- Foaled: 2011
- Country: United States
- Color: Bay
- Breeder: Elm Tree Farm, LLC & Popatop, LLC
- Owner: Glencrest Farm LLC (Greathouse brothers)
- Trainer: Todd Pletcher
- Record: 4: 4-0-0
- Earnings: US$308,100

Major wins
- Forward Gal Stakes (2014); Davona Dale Stakes (2014)

Onlyforyou (April 9, 2011 – March 15, 2014) was an American Thoroughbred racemare.

== Background ==
Onlyforyou was a bay mare who had an irregular star. She was a daughter of Malibu Moon, the very successful sire whose progeny included Kentucky Derby winner Orb, American Champion Two-Year-Old Male Horse Declan's Moon, plus multiple Grade 1 winners including Japan's Obrushev. Onlyforyou's dam Erhu was an allowance horse who finished third in the Mint Julep Stakes and was a winner of three races. Onlyforyou was bought during the Keeneland September sale for $115,000. She was owned by the Greathouse brothers, John, David, Allen, and Edward, proprietors of the Glencrest Farm LLC near Midway, Kentucky. They entrusted Onlyforyou's training to future U.S. Racing Hall of Fame inductee, Todd Pletcher.

== Two-year old season ==
Onlyforyou began her career as a late two-year-old. She made her racing debut on November 10, 2013, at Aqueduct Racetrack. At the start of the race she broke in, bumping one of her opponents. She started stalking the leaders in third during the first quarter of a mile. Soon, at the half-mile, she took the lead and never lost it, opening up to win by 2 1/4 lengths.

A month later she made her second race at Gulfstream Park. She started inside, just off the pace. Despite this, she was ninth at the start. However she quickly rushed forward to third by the first quarter-mile. But by a half-mile she stalked in second by 1 1/2 lengths. By three-quarters of a mile she took the lead, and like before, she kept the lead and simply made it bigger as the race went on, until she crossed the wire first by 3 1/2 lengths.

== Three-year old season ==
Onlyforyou had about a month of rest before she was back on the racetrack. This time it was her graded stakes debut in the Grade 2 Forward Gal Stakes. Because of her two impressive wins she was the odds on favorite at 1/5. Fourth at the start of the race, she then took over the lead after a quarter-mile and led all the way, responding well under pressure and winning by 2 3/4 lengths.

Now 3 for 3, it was clear that the Kentucky Oaks would be the final destination for Onlyforyou. First, she needed to win more of the Oaks preps. So her next start would be another Grade 2, the Davona Dale Stakes. She would have to face off against future Breeders' Cup Distaff winner Stopchargingmaria who would also go on to win the Coaching Club American Oaks and the Alabama Stakes. Onlyforyou would be the even-money favorite in the Davona Dale. At the start she was second but quickly took the lead within a quarter-mile. Then she kept the lead to win by 2 1/4 lengths.

== Death ==
After winning her first four races she was scheduled to run in the Gulfstream Park Oaks. After that she would run in the Kentucky Oaks. On March 15, 2014, Onlyforyou was breezing at Palm Meadows. Things were going well until 1/8 of a mile in to the workout. She took a bad step and suffered a condylar fracture and the valuable future broodmare had to be euthanized shortly afterwards. Trainer Todd Pletcher said, "She had a complex condylar fracture that was displaced and irreparable. She worked and a little bit more than an eighth of a mile into the gallop (out) she took a bad step." He also said "Obviously this is a sad moment."

== Pedigree ==
Pedigree of Onlyforyou, chestnut filly, April 9, 2011
Sire Malibu Moon	A.P. Indy	Seattle Slew	Bold Reasoning
Sire Malibu Moon	A.P. Indy	Seattle Slew	My Charmer
Sire Malibu Moon	A.P. Indy	Weekend Surprise	Secretariat
Sire Malibu Moon	A.P. Indy	Weekend Surprise	Lassie Dear
Sire Malibu Moon	Macoumba	Mr. Prospector	Raise a Native
Sire Malibu Moon	Macoumba	Mr. Prospector	Gold Digger
Sire Malibu Moon	Macoumba	Maximova	Green Dancer
Sire Malibu Moon	Macoumba	Maximova	Baracala
Dam Erhu	Tactical Cat	Storm Cat	Storm Bird
Dam Erhu	Tactical Cat	Storm Cat	Terlingua
Dam Erhu	Tactical Cat	Terre Haute	Caro
Dam Erhu	Tactical Cat	Terre Haute	Mia Dancer
Dam Erhu	Sunday Morning	Sunny's Halo	Halo
Dam Erhu	Sunday Morning	Sunny's Halo	Mostly Sunny
Dam Erhu	Sunday Morning	Great Finesse	Bold Bidder
Dam Erhu	Sunday Morning	Great Finesse	Her Delight (family: 14-f)
