= West Health =

Healthcare organization in San Diego, United States

- Founded: 2009
- Founders: Gary and Mary West
- Type: Gary and Mary West Health Institute: 501(c)3 Medical Research Organization; West Health Policy Center: 501(c)3 E05 (Research Institutes and/or Public Policy Analysis; Gary and Mary West Foundation: 501(c)3 private, non-operating Foundation)
- Purpose: Lowering healthcare costs to enable successful aging
- Location: San Diego, California, United States of America
- Origins: Philanthropists Gary and Mary West made their money through West Corporation, a private telecommunications provider based in Omaha, Nebraska. In 2006, the Wests sold their shares of the company for $1.4 billion. That was when they turned their sights on philanthropy, founding the Gary and Mary West Foundation, which has awarded more than $211 million in grants since its inception.
- Method: Independently funded by the Gary and Mary West Foundation and other donations from Gary and Mary West
- Owner: Gary and Mary West
- Key people: Shelley Lyford, President and CEO Tim Lash, Chief Strategy Officer Dr. Zia Agha, Chief Medical Officer
- Website: www.westhealth.org
- Formerly called: West Wireless Health Institute (2009–2012)

West Health is a group of non-profit organizations in the United States that is working to lower healthcare costs so that seniors can successfully age in place.

West Health is funded by philanthropists Gary and Mary West. It includes the Gary and Mary West Health Institute (WHI), the Gary and Mary West Foundation, and the Gary and Mary West Health Policy Center.

== West Health Institute ==
The WHI was created in 2009 with a $45 million grant from the West Foundation. It is an independent, medical research organization that works with healthcare providers and research institutions to lower healthcare costs and improve healthcare delivery and social services for seniors. Current projects include research into geriatric emergency care, improved services and oral health for seniors and ongoing public opinion research on healthcare costs.

Early research from WHI developed the Sense4Baby wireless maternal and fetal monitor for high-risk pregnancies, which they licensed to AirStrip. WHI also researched hospital wireless communication technology and interoperability software that was eventually licensed to the Center for Medical Interoperability

The Center is a separate organization led by hospital and health system CEOs to drive interoperability of medical technology. The Center is also funded by the Gary and Mary West Foundation.

== West Health Policy Center ==
The Gary and Mary West Health Policy Center is a nonprofit, non-partisan resource in Washington, D.C. that provides policy information and proposals to lower healthcare costs and improve healthcare in the U.S. for seniors. Launched in January 2012, it is researching ways to enable seniors to independently age in place through improved healthcare delivery and social services.

== Gary and Mary West Foundation ==
The Gary and Mary West Foundation provides funding to the WHI, the West Health Policy Center and other senior-focused national and community-based organizations. The West Foundation accepts grant proposals by invitation only, and has awarded more than $211 million since its inception.

== Leadership ==
Shelley Lyford became President and CEO of West Health on Sept. 4, 2015.

Nicholas J. Valeriani was named the Chief Executive of West Health in August 2012. Members of the Board of Directors are Gary West (Founder, Chairman); Nicholas J. Valeriani, MBA (Former Chief Executive); Charles Sederstrom; Dr. Michael Johns; and Mark McClellan.

== Headquarters ==
West Health is headquartered in San Diego, California. In December 2009, it opened its 3,600-square-foot (330 m^{2}) research facility, which contains a classroom for workshops and seminars. It also has an office in Washington D.C.

== Milestones ==
=== 2019 ===
- UC San Diego Health officially opened the Gary and Mary West Senior Emergency Care Unit at Jacobs Medical Center to provide specialty care to seniors

=== 2018 ===
- The West Foundation one of three philanthropies that provided $10 million to help establish Civica Rx, a new nonprofit generic drug company
- Survey from West Health Institute and NORC at the University of Chicago says 44% of Americans skip doctor visits because of cost
- West Health hosts the Health Care Costs Innovation Summit in Washington D.C. to address rising healthcare costs

=== 2017 ===
- Gary and Mary West were named outstanding philanthropists by the San Diego Chapter of the Association of Fundraising Professionals

=== 2016 ===
- Oct. 5 – The Gary and Mary West Senior Dental Center opened in downtown San Diego, a nonprofit dental center to serve low-income seniors and study the long-term effects of holistic care
- April 30 – $11.8 million in grants from Gary and Mary West established the Gary and Mary West Senior Emergency Care Unit at UC San Diego's Thornton Hospital, the first emergency department in region solely focused on seniors

=== 2015 ===
- July 7 – Nicholas Valeriani announced his retirement; Shelley Lyford was named incoming President and CEO
- February 12 – The APCD Council and West Health Policy Center launched APCD Manual to drive healthcare price transparency
- Mark McClellan named to boards of WHI and West Health Policy Center

=== 2014 ===
- December 12 – Research study on telecommunications-based care coordination with West Health Institute, Vanderbilt University Medical Center and West Corporation announced
- May 15 – West Health released study showing healthcare price transparency could save $100 billion over ten years
- May 8 – West Health released study showing potential benefits of value-based insurance design to high-deductible health plans
- February 13 – West Health Policy Center launched study with Harvard University and University of Michigan on insurance options for chronically-ill patients
- February 6 – WHI and the Office of the National Coordinator for Health Information Technology (ONC) co-hosted HCI-DC 2014: Igniting an Interoperable Health Care System conference in Washington, D.C.

=== 2013 ===
- December 12 – Institute announced research study on telecommunications-based care coordination with Vanderbilt University Medical Center and West Health.
- September 18 – The West Health Institute and the West Foundation created Center for Medical Interoperability to improve patient safety and lower costs of healthcare
- March 20 – Dr. Joe Smith testifies at a hearing before the House Energy and Commerce Subcommittee on Health about medical interoperability
- March 20 – WHI released study: "The Value of Medical Device Interoperability: Improving patient care with more than $30 billion in annual health care savings"
- March 3 – Institute demonstrated research advances in medical device interoperability to lower the cost of healthcare

=== 2012 ===
- December 3 – West Health Institute launched American Journal of Preventive Medicine Supplement focused on healthcare cost crisis at mHealth Summit
- October 30 – West Health Institute licensed Kinect-based physical therapy technology to Reflexion Health
- September 26 – West Health Institute unveiled new Kinect-based physical therapy technology, launches research studies with Naval Medical Center San Diego.
- September 18 – Sense4Baby, Inc. licensed Wireless Fetal Monitoring System in WHI's first technology transfer
- August 15 – Nick Valeriani Named CEO of West Health Institute, West Wireless Health Institute changed name to West Health Institute, West Health Incubator unveiled as fourth entity in West Health
- February 15 – Medical Grade Wireless Utility unveiled, hospital leaders champion IT solutions to lower health care costs
- January 26 – West Wireless Health Institute hosted HCI-DC 2012 with Centers for Medicare & Medicaid Services (CMS) as cohost
- January 23 – West Health Policy Center launched in Washington, D.C. targets $100B in common sense health care savings

=== 2011 ===
- April 28 – WWHI hosted second Health Care Innovation Day (HCI-DC), cohosted with the U.S. Food and Drug Administration

=== 2010 ===
- November 8 – WWHI developed its first engineered prototype, Sense4Baby, a non-invasive wireless device designed to make fetal and maternal monitoring more readily available to expectant mothers.
- October 12 – WWHI hosted inaugural Health Care Innovation Day (HCI-DC) with U.S. Department of Veterans Affairs as cohost
- June 25 – Carlos Slim Health Institute and West Wireless Health Institute partnered on Wireless Health Initiatives in U.S., Mexico and throughout Latin America

=== 2009 ===
- December – WWHI moved to headquarters on San Diego's Torrey Pines Research Mesa.
- July 23 – WWHI is acknowledged as a nonprofit 501(c)(3) organization by the Internal Revenue Service.
- March 30 – West Wireless Health Institute is launched in San Diego, California with a $45 million grant from the West Foundation.
