= Miss Oceana =

American-bred Thoroughbred racehorse

- Sire: Alydar
- Grandsire: Raise a Native
- Dam: Kittiwake
- Damsire: Sea-Bird
- Sex: Filly
- Foaled: 1981
- Country: United States
- Colour: Bay
- Breeder: Newstead Farm
- Owner: Newstead Farm
- Trainer: Woody Stephens
- Record: 19: 11-6-1
- Earnings: US$1,010,385

Major wins
- Arlington-Washington Lassie Stakes (1983); Frizette Stakes (1983); Selima Stakes (1983); Acorn Stakes (1984); Bonnie Miss Stakes (1984); Forward Gal Stakes (1984); Gazelle Handicap (1984); Hibiscus Stakes (1984); Maskette Stakes (1984)

Honours
- Miss Oceana Stakes at Aqueduct Racetrack; Miss Oceana Stakes at Arlington Park
- Last updated on March 23, 2010

Miss Oceana (1981–1988) was an American Thoroughbred racehorse who won six Grade 1 stakes during her racing career and was sold for a World Record price as a broodmare.

== Background ==
Bred and raced by Mark Hardin's and the Schwab families' Newstead Farm of Upperville, Virginia, Miss Oceana was sired by U.S. Racing Hall of Fame inductee Alydar. Her dam was the good racing mare Kittiwake, who was owned by Mark Hardin's stepmother, Katherine Bliss Hardin. Kittiwake was a daughter of the Sea-Bird, winner of the 1965 Epsom Derby and Prix de l'Arc de Triomphe, and a French Horse Racing Hall of Fame inductee who earned a Timeform rating of 145 that as at March 2010 remains the highest in racing history

== Racing career ==
Trained by Hall of Fame inductee Woody Stephens, at age two Miss Oceana won the Grades 1 Arlington-Washington Lassie, Frizette, and Selima Stakes and was runner-up to Althea for American Champion Two-Year-Old Filly honors.

At age three, Miss Oceana won six important races including the Grades 1 Acorn Stakes, Gazelle Handicap, and Maskette Stakes. Once again, she was beaten out for an Eclipse Award, finishing behind Life's Magic in the voting for American Champion Three-Year-Old Filly honors.

== Record selling price ==
Retired from racing with earnings in excess of $1 million, Miss Oceana was bred to super-sire Northern Dancer. While in foal, she was sold in a November 10, 1985, Fasig-Tipton dispersal of Newstead Farm's breeding stock. Financier Carl Icahn paid a then-world-record price for a broodmare of US$7 million.

== Breeding record ==
Miss Oceana's foal, named Oceanic Dancer, had no success in racing and was sold to a breeding operation in Venezuela where he sired six Black Type winners. Carl Icahn next bred Miss Oceana to 1977 U.S. Triple Crown winner, Seattle Slew. Miss Oceana died in 1988 following complications while giving birth to the Seattle Slew colt that was named Cien Fuegos. Sold at auction as a yearling for $450,000, Cien Fuegos met with very limited success in racing and modest success at stud.

== Pedigree ==
Pedigree of Miss Oceana
Sire Alydar	Raise a Native	Native Dancer	Polynesian
Sire Alydar	Raise a Native	Native Dancer	Geisha
Sire Alydar	Raise a Native	Raise You	Case Ace
Sire Alydar	Raise a Native	Raise You	Lady Glory
Sire Alydar	Sweet Tooth	On-and-On	Nasrullah
Sire Alydar	Sweet Tooth	On-and-On	Two Lea
Sire Alydar	Sweet Tooth	Plum Cake	Ponder
Sire Alydar	Sweet Tooth	Plum Cake	Real Delight
Dam Kittiwake	Sea Bird	Dan Cupid	Native Dancer
Dam Kittiwake	Sea Bird	Dan Cupid	Vixenette
Dam Kittiwake	Sea Bird	Sicalade	Sicambre
Dam Kittiwake	Sea Bird	Sicalade	Marmelade
Dam Kittiwake	Ole Liz	Double Jay	Balladier
Dam Kittiwake	Ole Liz	Double Jay	Broomshot
Dam Kittiwake	Ole Liz	Islay Mist	Roman
Dam Kittiwake	Ole Liz	Islay Mist	Evening Mist
