= Intrado =

American call center company

- Formerly: West Corporation
- Type: Private
- Industry: Unified Communications; Interactive Services; Specialized Agent Services; Telecom Services; Safety Services
- Founder: Gary West; Mary West
- Headquarters: Omaha, Nebraska, US
- Key people: John Shlonsky (CEO); Matt Carter (president, Life & Safety Division)
- Revenue: ▲$2.6 billion USD (2012)
- Owner: Apollo Global Management
- Number of employees: 9,659 (2018)
- Website: intrado.com

Intrado, formerly West Corporation, is an American telecommunications company. It was purchased by private equity firm Apollo Global Management on October 11, 2017.

== Business Operations ==
Intrado is reorganized in five main segments: Cloud Collaboration, Life and Safety (including 911 operations), Enterprise Communications, Digital Media (including streaming operations), and Health and Wellness (including healthcare claims and customer support) in 2019. It spun out its telemarketing brand to West Revenue Generation Services (WRGS), also owned by Apollo Global Management in 2019

== History ==
Gary and Mary West co-founded WATS Marketing of America in 1978. The couple left the company in 1985 and Mary West founded West Teleservices with Troy Eaden in 1986. Gary West joined West Teleservices one year later as chairman.

During the first decade, West Teleservices hired thousands of employees and reached over $100 million in net proceeds. West Teleservices expanded their products through a series of acquisitions, including Tel Mark Sales Inc., Intercall, Televox, and HyperCube.

In November 1996, West went public with 2,000 employees.

In 2002, West acquired Tel Mark Sales, Dakotah Direct, and Attention, LLC. The following year, West acquired conferencing company InterCall and ConferenceCall.com.

In 2006, West which had been publicly traded since 1996, recapitalized under the sponsorship of investor groups led by Thomas H. Lee Partners and Quadrangle Group. Gary and Mary West continued to maintain 25 percent of the company.

In January 2015, West announced the sale of its agent services businesses to Alorica. The sale closed in early March 2015.

In October 2017, West was purchased by Apollo Global Management, a New York-based private equity firm, for $5.2 billion.

On August 31, 2018 West Corporation laid off 148 employees between their Middleton, WI and Green Bay, WI location after losing a major contract.

On June 25, 2019 West Corporation rebranded itself to Intrado.

On September 11, 2020 Intrado acquired Syn-Apps LLC, developer of mass notification software.

On December 20, 2020 Intrado acquired Asparia

On January 31, 2023 Stonepeak acquired Intrado Life & Safety for $2.4 billion. The Intrado name and brand will transition with the safety business. Intrado Corporation rebranded its remaining holdings to West Technology Group, LLC.

On October 2, 2023 Matt Carter was appointed CEO of Intrado Life & Safety replacing Jeff Robertson.

== Name history ==
- November 1996: West TeleServices Corporation
- January 1, 2001: West Corporation
- June 25, 2019: Intrado

== Controversies ==
In April 2014, Intrado was partially responsible for a 14-state 911 outage that affected an estimated 11 million people and 6,000 emergency help calls. As a result, the FCC fined Intrado $1.4 million.

In November 2019, Intrado agreed to pay $175,000 to the US Treasury due to glitches in their system that occurred in August 2018 that left millions without access to 911 access for 65 minutes across 6 states.

In September 2020, 911 outages were reported across 14 states for more than an hour due in part to Intrado.

== Acquisitions ==
Between 2002 and 2013, West Corporation invested approximately $2.7 billion in strategic acquisitions.

West has acquired:

- Tel Mark Sales —2002
- Dakotah Direct —2002
- Attention LLC —2002
- InterCall —2003
- ConferenceCall.com — October 2003
- Worldwide Asset Management — September 2004
- ECI Conference Call Services — November 2004
- Sprint Conferencing — May 2005
- Intrado — April 2006
- Raindance Communications — April 2006
- CenterPost Communications — February 2007
- TeleVox Software — March 2007
- Omnium Worldwide — April 2007
- HBF Communications — April 2008
- Genesys Conferencing — May 2008
- Stream 57 - January 2010
- SKT Business Communications Solutions - March 2010
- Holly Connects — May 2010
- TuVox - July 2010
- Specialty Pharmacy Network – February 2011
- Twenty First Century Communications - February 2011
- PostCTI - February 2011
- Unisfair - March 2011
- Smoothstone IP Communications - April 2011
- HyperCube – November 2011
- SchoolMessenger - April 2014
- ClientTell, Inc. - November 2015
- Magnetic North. - November 2015
- Callpointe.com Inc - May 2017
- ECaTS - November 2017
- PhoneTree - December 2017
- GlobeNewswire - April 2018
- Flowroute - June 2018
- Asparia - December 2020

== Awards ==
- April 2013 National College and West Corporation & Business Solutions Distinguished Community Employer
