= TuVox =

TuVox, Inc.
- Type: Privately Held
- Industry: Call Center Automation Solutions, IVR Solutions
- Founded: 2001
- Headquarters: Cupertino, California, United States
- Key people: CEO: Mark Lazar, Founders: Steven Pollock and Ashok Khosla
- Products: speech recognition, speech synthesis, VXML
- Website: www.tuvox.com

TuVox is a company that produces VXML-based telephone speech-recognition applications to replace DTMF touch-tone systems for their clients.

== History ==
TuVox was founded in 2001 by Steven S. Pollock and Ashok Khosla, formerly of Apple Computer Corporation and Claris Corporation. Since then, TuVox has grown to over 150 employees and has US offices in Cupertino, California and Boca Raton, Florida as well as international offices in London, Vancouver and Sydney. In 2005, TuVox acquired the customers and hosting facilities of Net-By-Tel. In 2007, the company raised $20m for its speech recognition, and phone menu software.

On July 22, 2010, West Interactive — a subsidiary of West Corporation — announced its acquisition of TuVox.

== Customers ==
TuVox clients include: 1-800-Flowers.com, AMC Entertainment, American Airlines, British Airways, M&T Bank, Canon Inc., Gateway, Inc., Motorola, Progress Energy Inc., Telecom New Zealand, Time, Inc., BECU, Virgin America and USAA.
