= Open Mind (horse) =

American Thoroughbred racehorse

- Sire: Deputy Minister
- Grandsire: Vice Regent
- Dam: Stage Luck
- Damsire: Stage Door Johnny
- Sex: Filly
- Foaled: 1986
- Country: United States
- Colour: Chestnut
- Breeder: Due Process Stables
- Owner: Eugene V. Klein
- Trainer: D. Wayne Lukas
- Record: 19: 12-2-2
- Earnings: $1,844,372

Major wins
- Demoiselle Stakes (1988); Kentucky Oaks (1989); Pimlico Oaks (1989); Acorn Stakes (1989); Mother Goose Stakes (1989); Coaching Club American Oaks (1989); Alabama Stakes (1989); Bonnie Miss Stakes (1989); Forward Gal Stakes (1989) Breeders' Cup wins: Breeders' Cup Juvenile Fillies (1988)

Awards
- American Champion Two-Year-Old Filly (1988); American Champion Three-Year-Old Filly (1989)

Honours
- US Racing Hall of Fame (2011)

Open Mind (foaled 1986 – died 1998) was an American Thoroughbred racing filly. In 1988, she won the Eclipse Award for American Champion Two-Year-Old Filly. In 1989, she won the award as American Champion Three-Year-Old Filly. In her third year, she also won the American Triple Tiara of Thoroughbred Racing.

Open Mind (chestnut filly, by Deputy Minister out of Stage Lucky, by Stage Door Johnny), was bred in New Jersey by Due Process Stables. She won 12 of her 19 career starts. Owned by Eugene V. Klein and trained by Hall of Famer D. Wayne Lukas, Open Mind was named champion 2-year-old filly of 1988 when she won four of six starts, including the Grade I Breeders' Cup Juvenile Fillies with Ángel Cordero Jr. in the stirrups.

At age three, Open Mind won eight of her 11 starts, including the New York Filly Triple Crown (the Acorn Stakes, the Mother Goose Stakes, and the Coaching Club American Oaks). Each of these were Grade I events. That year, she also won the Kentucky Oaks and the Alabama Stakes. Her victory in the Alabama Stakes was her 10th consecutive win, seven of which came in grade I races.

Open Mind died in Japan in 1998.

== Pedigree ==
Pedigree of Open Mind (USA), chestnut filly, 1986
Sire Deputy Minister (CAN) 1979	Vice Regent (CAN); 1967	Northern Dancer (CAN)	Neartic (CAN)
Sire Deputy Minister (CAN) 1979	Vice Regent (CAN); 1967	Northern Dancer (CAN)	Natalma (USA)
Sire Deputy Minister (CAN) 1979	Vice Regent (CAN); 1967	Victoria Regina (CAN)	Menetrier (FRA)
Sire Deputy Minister (CAN) 1979	Vice Regent (CAN); 1967	Victoria Regina (CAN)	Victoriana (CAN)
Sire Deputy Minister (CAN) 1979	Mint Copy (CAN); 1970	Bunty's Flight (CAN)	Bunty Lawless (CAN)
Sire Deputy Minister (CAN) 1979	Mint Copy (CAN); 1970	Bunty's Flight (CAN)	Broomflight (USA)
Sire Deputy Minister (CAN) 1979	Mint Copy (CAN); 1970	Shackney (USA)	Jabneh (USA)
Sire Deputy Minister (CAN) 1979	Mint Copy (CAN); 1970	Shackney (USA)	Grass Shack (USA)
Dam Stage Luck (USA) 1972	Stage Door Johnny (USA); 1965	Prince John (USA)	Prince Quillo (IRE)
Dam Stage Luck (USA) 1972	Stage Door Johnny (USA); 1965	Prince John (USA)	Not Afraid (USA)
Dam Stage Luck (USA) 1972	Stage Door Johnny (USA); 1965	Peroxide Blonde (USA)	Ballymoss (GB)
Dam Stage Luck (USA) 1972	Stage Door Johnny (USA); 1965	Peroxide Blonde (USA)	Folie Douce (FRA)
Dam Stage Luck (USA) 1972	Take a Stand (USA); 1966	Amerigo (GB)	Nearco (ITY)
Dam Stage Luck (USA) 1972	Take a Stand (USA); 1966	Amerigo (GB)	Sanlinea (GB)
Dam Stage Luck (USA) 1972	Take a Stand (USA); 1966	Self Control (USA)	Better Self (USA)
Dam Stage Luck (USA) 1972	Take a Stand (USA); 1966	Self Control (USA)	Alibhai Rose (USA)
