= Davona Dale Stakes =

- Class: Grade II
- Location: Gulfstream Park; Hallandale Beach, Florida, United States
- Inaugurated: 1988
- Race type: Thoroughbred – Flat racing
- Sponsor: Fasig-Tipton (since 2025)
- Website: Gulfstream Park

Race information
- Distance: 1 mile
- Surface: Dirt
- Track: left-handed
- Qualification: Three-year-old fillies
- Weight: 124 lbs with allowances
- Purse: US$200,000 (since 2014)
- Bonuses: Qualification points – Road to the Kentucky Oaks.

The Davona Dale Stakes is a Grade II American Thoroughbred horse race for three year old fillies, over a distance of one mile on the dirt held annually in late February or early March at Gulfstream Park, Hallandale Beach, Florida. The event currently carries a purse of $200,000.

== History ==
The Davona Dale is named after Calumet Farm's champion homebred filly foaled in 1976. She not only won the Grade I Kentucky Oaks as a 3-year-old, but then swept the New York Triple Tiara series: the Acorn Stakes, the Mother Goose Stakes, and the Coaching Club American Oaks. She is the only filly to win the Kentucky Oaks, the Black-Eyed Susan Stakes and the Triple Tiara. Davona Dale was inducted into the National Museum of Racing and Hall of Fame in 1985. She also ranks #90 in Blood-Horse magazine List of the Top 100 Racehorses of the 20th Century.

The event was inaugurated on 5 March 1988 and was run in split divisions over a distance of 7 furlongs for four year old fillies and mares.

In 1990 the conditions of the event was limited to three year old fillies.

In 1991 the distance of the event was increased to one mile and seventy yards.

The event was upgraded to Grade III in 1993 and upgraded once more to Grade II in 1998.

The Davona Dale has been run at a variety of distances with the current distance of one mile set in 2015.

The event is part of the Road to the Kentucky Oaks.

== Records ==
Speed Record:

- 1 mile – 1:36.23 Kathleen O (2022)
- 7 furlongs - 1:22.60 Waggley (1989)
- 1 mile & 70 yards - 1:39.31 Glitter Woman (1997)
- 1 1/16 miles - 1:42.30 Live Lively (2013)
- 1 1/8 miles - 1:50.20 Sis City (2005)

Margins:

- 16 lengths - Sis City (2005)

Most wins by an owner:

- 2 – Scott Savin (1989, 1990)

Most wins by a jockey:

- 6 – John Velazquez (1999, 2001, 2003, 2005, 2006, 2011)

Most wins by a trainer:

- 5 – Claude R. McGaughey III (1988, 1997, 2003, 2018, 2022)

== Winners ==
Year	Winner	Age	Jockey	Trainer	Owner	Distance	Time	Purse	Grade	Ref
2026	She Be Smooth	3	Flavien Prat	Todd A. Pletcher	Calumet Farm	1 mile	1:37.78	$205,000	II	
2025	The Queens M G	3	Irad Ortiz Jr.	Saffie A. Joseph Jr.	C2 Racing Stable & Mathis Stable	1 mile	1:37.85	$200,000	II	
2024	Fiona's Magic	3	Tyler Gaffalione	Michael Yates	Stonehedge	1 mile	1:37.16	$200,000	II	
2023	Dorth Vader	3	Miguel Vasquez	Michael Yates	John Ropes	1 mile	1:37.23	$200,000	II	
2022	Kathleen O.	3	Javier Castellano	Claude R. McGaughey III	Winngate Stables	1 mile	1:36.23	$200,000	II	
2021	Wholebodemeister	3	Edgard Zayas	Juan Avila	Sabana Farm	1 mile	1:36.89	$200,000	II	
2020	Tonalist's Shape	3	Tyler Gaffalione	Saffie A. Joseph Jr.	Slam Dunk Racing, Doug Branham & Legacy Ranch	1 mile	1:36.77	$200,000	II	
2019	Jeltrin	3	Luis Saez	Alexis Delgado	ADR Racing Stable	1 mile	1:36.83	$200,000	II	
2018	Fly So High	3	Jose L. Ortiz	Claude R. McGaughey III	Phipps Stable	1 mile	1:38.69	$200,000	II	
2017	Miss Sky Warrior	3	Paco Lopez	Kelly J. Breen	Arlene's Sun Star Stable	1 mile	1:38.49	$200,000	II	
2016	Cathryn Sophia	3	Javier Castellano	John C. Servis	Cash is King	1 mile	1:36.61	$200,000	II	
2015	Ekati's Phaeton	3	Luis Saez	William A. Kaplan	Phaedrus Flights	1 mile	1:37.66	$200,000	II	
2014	Onlyforyou	3	Javier Castellano	Todd A. Pletcher	Glencrest Farm	1 1/16 miles	1:43.71	$200,000	II	
2013	Live Lively	3	Joel Rosario	Mark A. Hennig	R. Lee Lewis	1 1/16 miles	1:42.30	$245,000	II	
2012	Yara	3	Jesus Lopez Castanon	Jose Garoffalo	Peras International	1 1/16 miles	1:43.41	$350,000	II	
2011	R Heat Lightning	3	John R. Velazquez	Todd A. Pletcher	E. Paul Robsham Stables	1 mile	1:36.25	$250,000	II	
2010	Amen Hallelujah	3	Julien R. Leparoux	Richard E. Dutrow Jr.	IEAH Stables & Whizway Farms	1 mile	1:37.16	$150,000	II	
2009	Justwhistledixie	3	Alan Garcia	Kiaran P. McLaughlin	West Point Thoroughbreds, Lakland Farm & Randell D. Hubbard	1 mile	1:37.67	$150,000	II	
2008	Bsharpsonata	3	Eric Camacho	Timothy E. Salzman	Cloverleaf Farm II	1 mile	1:37.97	$150,000	II	
2007	Christmas Kid	3	Rene R. Douglas	James A. Jerkens	Edward P. Evans	1 mile	1:37.34	$150,000	II	
2006	Wait A While	3	John R. Velazquez	Todd A. Pletcher	Arindel	1 1/8 miles	1:50.27	$150,000	II	
2005	Sis City	3	John R. Velazquez	Richard E. Dutrow Jr.	Joe Torre, Sanford Goldfarb, Ira Davis & Michae Dubb	1 1/8 miles	1:50.20	$150,000	II	
2004	Miss Coronado	3	Cornelio Velasquez	Robert J. Frankel	Stonerside Stable	1 1/16 miles	1:44.62	$150,000	II	
2003	Yell	3	John R. Velazquez	Claude R. McGaughey III	Claiborne Farm & Mrs. Adele Dilschneider	1 1/16 miles	1:44.96	$150,000	II	
2002	Ms Brookski	3	Rosemary Homeister Jr.	Reed M. Combest	Phil Combest	1 1/16 miles	1:45.14	$150,000	II	
2001	Latour	3	John R. Velazquez	John C. Kimmel	Heiligbrodt Racing Stable	1 1/16 miles	1:45.51	$103,000	II	
2000	Cash Run	3	Jerry D. Bailey	D. Wayne Lukas	Padua Stables	1 mile & 70 yards	1:40.37	$100,000	II	
1999	Three Ring	3	John R. Velazquez	Edward Plesa Jr.	Barry K. Schwartz	1 mile & 70 yards	1:41.53	$100,000	II	
1998	Diamond On the Run	3	Pat Day	Stanley M. Hough	Robert & Bea Roberts	1 mile & 70 yards	1:42.65	$100,000	II	
1997	Glitter Woman	3	Mike E. Smith	Claude R. McGaughey III	H. Joseph Allen	1 mile & 70 yards	1:39.31	$100,000	III	
1996	Plum Country	3	Pat Day	David A. Vivian	Dominick Vittese	1 mile & 70 yards	1:42.08	$100,000	III	
1995	Mia's Hope	3	Kristi L. Chapman	Harold J. Rose	Harold J. Rose	1 mile & 70 yards	1:43.26	$100,000	III	
1994	Cut the Charm	3	Jerry D. Bailey	James E. Bracken	Kathy Jo Stable	1 mile & 70 yards	1:41.44	$100,000	III	
1993	Lunar Spook	3	Mark Guidry	J. Bert Sonnier	Sandbar Farm	1 mile & 70 yards	1:42.09	$100,000	III	
1992	Miss Legality	3	Julie Krone	Hubert Hine	Norton D. Waltuch	1 mile & 70 yards	1:42.00	$50,000	Listed	
1991	Fancy Ribbons	3	Craig Perret	D. Wayne Lukas	Overbrook Farm	1 mile & 70 yards	1:41.10	$71,100	Listed	
1990	Big Pride	3	Earlie Fires	Hubert Hine	Scott Savin	7 furlongs	1:26.00	$35,000		
1989	Waggley	6	Jean-Luc Samyn	Hubert Hine	Scott Savin	7 furlongs	1:22.60	$26,775		
1988	Charming Tigress	4	Pat Day	George R. Arnold II	Phillip D. Needham	7 furlongs	1:23.00	$37,115		Division 1
1988	Cadillacing	5	Randy Romero	Claude R. McGaughey III	Ogden Phipps	7 furlongs	1:24.60	$35,715		Division 2

== See also ==
- Davona Dale Stakes top three finishers and starters
- Road to the Kentucky Oaks
- List of American and Canadian Graded races
