= She's a Tiger =

American-bred Thoroughbred racehorse

- Sire: Tale of the Cat
- Grandsire: Storm Cat
- Dam: Shandra Smiles
- Damsire: Cahill Road
- Sex: Mare
- Foaled: 10 May 2011
- Country: United States
- Color: Bay
- Breeder: Rodney Orr
- Owner: Mark Dedomenico, Allen J. Aldrich et al
- Trainer: Jeff Bonde
- Record: 7: 3-3-0
- Earnings: $727,657

Major wins
- Landaluce Stakes (2013); Del Mar Debutante Stakes (2013)

Awards
- American Champion Two-Year-Old Filly (2013)

She's a Tiger (foaled 10 May 2011) is an American Thoroughbred racehorse. In 2013, racing exclusively in California, she won three of her six races including the Del Mar Debutante Stakes and was disqualified after finishing first in the Breeders' Cup Juvenile Fillies. She was voted American Champion Two-Year-Old Filly for 2013.

== Background ==
She's a Tiger is a bay filly with a narrow white blaze and two white socks bred in Kentucky by Rodney Orr. Her sire, Tale of the Cat, was a high class racehorse who won the King's Bishop Stakes in 1997 and finished second to Awesome Again in the Whitney Stakes a year later. At stud, his most successful performer to date has been the multiple Grade I winner Gio Ponti. Her dam, Shandra Smiles, has produced several other winners including the leading sprinter Smiling Tiger, the winner of the Bing Crosby Stakes, Ancient Title Stakes and Triple Bend Handicap.

As a yearling, the filly was consigned by Warrendale Stables to the September sale at Keeneland where she was bought for $150,000 by Mersad Metanovic Bloodstock.

== Racing career ==
=== 2013: two-year-old season ===
She's a Tiger made her racecourse debut in a maiden race over five furlongs at the Alameda County Fairgrounds in Pleasanton, California. The race proved to be little more than a workout for the filly, who started at odds of 1/5 and won by nine lengths. Three weeks later the filly appeared on the synthetic Cushion Track at Hollywood Park Racetrack and started 3/5 favourite for the Landaluce Stakes over six furlongs. Ridden in her debut by Frank Alvarado she took the lead soon after the start, went clear of her rivals in the straight and held off the challenge of E Equalsmcsquared to win by three quarters of a length. In the following month, She's a Tiger was moved up in class and distance for the Grade II Sorrento Stakes on the Polytrack surface at Del Mar Racetrack. She led the field in the straight and fought back after being headed, but was beaten half a length by the Canadian-bred filly Concave. On September 1, over the same course and distance, She's a Tiger (wearing blinkers for the first time) and Concave met again in the Del Mar Debutante Stakes, a Grade I event which also attracted the highly regarded fillies Awesome Baby and Fascinating. Gary Stevens rode the filly for the first time and disputed the lead with Awesome Baby from the start, before opening up a two and a half length advantage in the straight. She was challenged in the closing stages but "ran on gamely under pressure" to win by half a length from Fascinating. After the race, her trainer Jeff Bonde commented "She got stronger, and when we added (blinkers) she got more focused. She was very professional in the paddock. A lot of Tale of the Cats can get a little hot, but she's got such great mentality and I'm really pleased with her". The filly then moved to racing on dirt when she contested the Grade I Chandelier Stakes over eight and a half furlongs at Santa Anita Park on September 28. She's a Tiger took the lead on the backstretch and took a clear lead but was worn down by the Rosie Napravnik-ridden Secret Compass in the closing stages and beaten a head, with Fascinating finishing strongly to take third place.

She's a Tiger ended her first season in the Breeders' Cup Juvenile Fillies at Santa Anita in which she was again ridden by Stevens. She started at odds of 4/1, level with the Spinaway Stakes winner Sweet Reason and behind the Frizette Stakes winner Artemis Agrotera, who was favored at 7/2. She took an early lead and went four clear of her rivals on the final turn. In the straight the 40/1 outsider Ria Antonia emerged as the only serious challenger and the two fillies were level with fifty yards to run when She's a Tiger edged away from the inside rail and bumped her rival. She's a Tiger crossed the line a nose ahead of Rio Antonia, but after an inquiry by the racecourse stewards, she was disqualified for causing interference and demoted to second. Bonde described the result of the inquiry as "just heartbreaking".

In January 2014, She's a Tiger was named Champion Two-Year-Old Filly at the Eclipse Awards, taking 212 of the 249 votes.

=== 2014: three-year-old season ===
On her first appearance as a three-year-old, She's a Tiger started as the 13/5 second favorite for the Eight Belles Stakes at Churchill Downs on 2 May but finished seventh of the nine runners behind Fiftyshadesofgold.

== Pedigree ==
Pedigree of She's a Tiger (USA), bay filly, 2011
Sire Tale of the Cat (USA) 1994	Storm Cat (USA); 1983	Storm Bird	Northern Dancer
Sire Tale of the Cat (USA) 1994	Storm Cat (USA); 1983	Storm Bird	South Ocean
Sire Tale of the Cat (USA) 1994	Storm Cat (USA); 1983	Terlingua	Secretariat
Sire Tale of the Cat (USA) 1994	Storm Cat (USA); 1983	Terlingua	Crimson Saint
Sire Tale of the Cat (USA) 1994	Yarn (USA); 1987	Mr. Prospector	Raise a Native
Sire Tale of the Cat (USA) 1994	Yarn (USA); 1987	Mr. Prospector	Gold Digger
Sire Tale of the Cat (USA) 1994	Yarn (USA); 1987	Narrate	Honest Pleasure
Sire Tale of the Cat (USA) 1994	Yarn (USA); 1987	Narrate	State
Dam Shandra Smiles (USA) 1998	Cahill Road (USA); 1988	Fappiano	Mr. Prospector
Dam Shandra Smiles (USA) 1998	Cahill Road (USA); 1988	Fappiano	Killaloe
Dam Shandra Smiles (USA) 1998	Cahill Road (USA); 1988	Gana Facil	Le Fabuleux
Dam Shandra Smiles (USA) 1998	Cahill Road (USA); 1988	Gana Facil	Charedi
Dam Shandra Smiles (USA) 1998	Beyond the Storm (USA); 1990	Great Above	Minnesota Mac
Dam Shandra Smiles (USA) 1998	Beyond the Storm (USA); 1990	Great Above	Ta Wee
Dam Shandra Smiles (USA) 1998	Beyond the Storm (USA); 1990	Brenda's Storm	Medieval Man
Dam Shandra Smiles (USA) 1998	Beyond the Storm (USA); 1990	Brenda's Storm	Ruler's Storm (Family: 5-g)
