= Cash Run =

American-bred Thoroughbred racehorse

- Sire: Seeking the Gold
- Grandsire: Mr. Prospector
- Dam: Shared Interest
- Damsire: Pleasant Colony
- Sex: Filly
- Country: United States
- Owner: Padua Stables
- Trainer: D. Wayne Lukas
- Earnings: $924,201

Major wins
- Breeders' Cup wins: Breeders' Cup Juvenile Fillies (1999)

Cash Run (born 1997) is an American Thoroughbred racing filly. In 1999, she won the Breeders' Cup Juvenile Fillies and finished second in Eclipse Award balloting to Chilukki. She won the Bonnie Miss Stakes and Davona Dale Stakes at Gulfstream Park in the first part of her 3-year-old season, but her form dropped off sharply after that. She ran third in two stakes in her next eight races, and was retired with five wins from 17 starts. She was retired for stud in 2001.

== Pedigree ==
Pedigree of Cash Run (USA), dark brown filly, 1997
Sire Seeking the Gold (USA) 1985	Mr. Prospector (USA); 1970	Raise a Native (USA)	Native Dancer (USA)
Sire Seeking the Gold (USA) 1985	Mr. Prospector (USA); 1970	Raise a Native (USA)	Raise You (USA)
Sire Seeking the Gold (USA) 1985	Mr. Prospector (USA); 1970	Gold Digger (USA)	Nashua (USA)
Sire Seeking the Gold (USA) 1985	Mr. Prospector (USA); 1970	Gold Digger (USA)	Sequence (USA)†
Sire Seeking the Gold (USA) 1985	Con Game (USA); 1974	Buckpasser (USA)	Tom Fool (USA)
Sire Seeking the Gold (USA) 1985	Con Game (USA); 1974	Buckpasser (USA)	Busanda (USA)
Sire Seeking the Gold (USA) 1985	Con Game (USA); 1974	Broadway (USA)	Hasty Road (USA)
Sire Seeking the Gold (USA) 1985	Con Game (USA); 1974	Broadway (USA)	Flit About (USA)
Dam Shared Interest (USA) 1988	Pleasant Colony (USA); 1978	His Majesty (USA)	Ribot (GB)
Dam Shared Interest (USA) 1988	Pleasant Colony (USA); 1978	His Majesty (USA)	Flower Bowl (USA)
Dam Shared Interest (USA) 1988	Pleasant Colony (USA); 1978	Sun Colony (USA)	Sunrise Flight (USA)
Dam Shared Interest (USA) 1988	Pleasant Colony (USA); 1978	Sun Colony (USA)	Colonia (URU)
Dam Shared Interest (USA) 1988	Surgery (USA); 1976	Dr. Fager (USA)	Rough'n Tumble (USA)
Dam Shared Interest (USA) 1988	Surgery (USA); 1976	Dr. Fager (USA)	Aspidistra (USA)
Dam Shared Interest (USA) 1988	Surgery (USA); 1976	Bold Sequence (USA)	Bold Ruler (USA)
Dam Shared Interest (USA) 1988	Surgery (USA); 1976	Bold Sequence (USA)	Sequence (USA)†

† indicates inbreeding
