= Edward P. Evans =

American businessman and horse breeder (1942–2010)

Edward Parker Evans
- Born: January 31, 1942; Pittsburgh, Pennsylvania, U.S.
- Died: December 31, 2010 (aged 68); New York City, U.S.
- Education: Phillips Academy; Yale University; Harvard Business School
- Occupations: Businessman, horse breeder, philanthropist
- Parent(s): Thomas Mellon Evans; Elizabeth Jane Parker

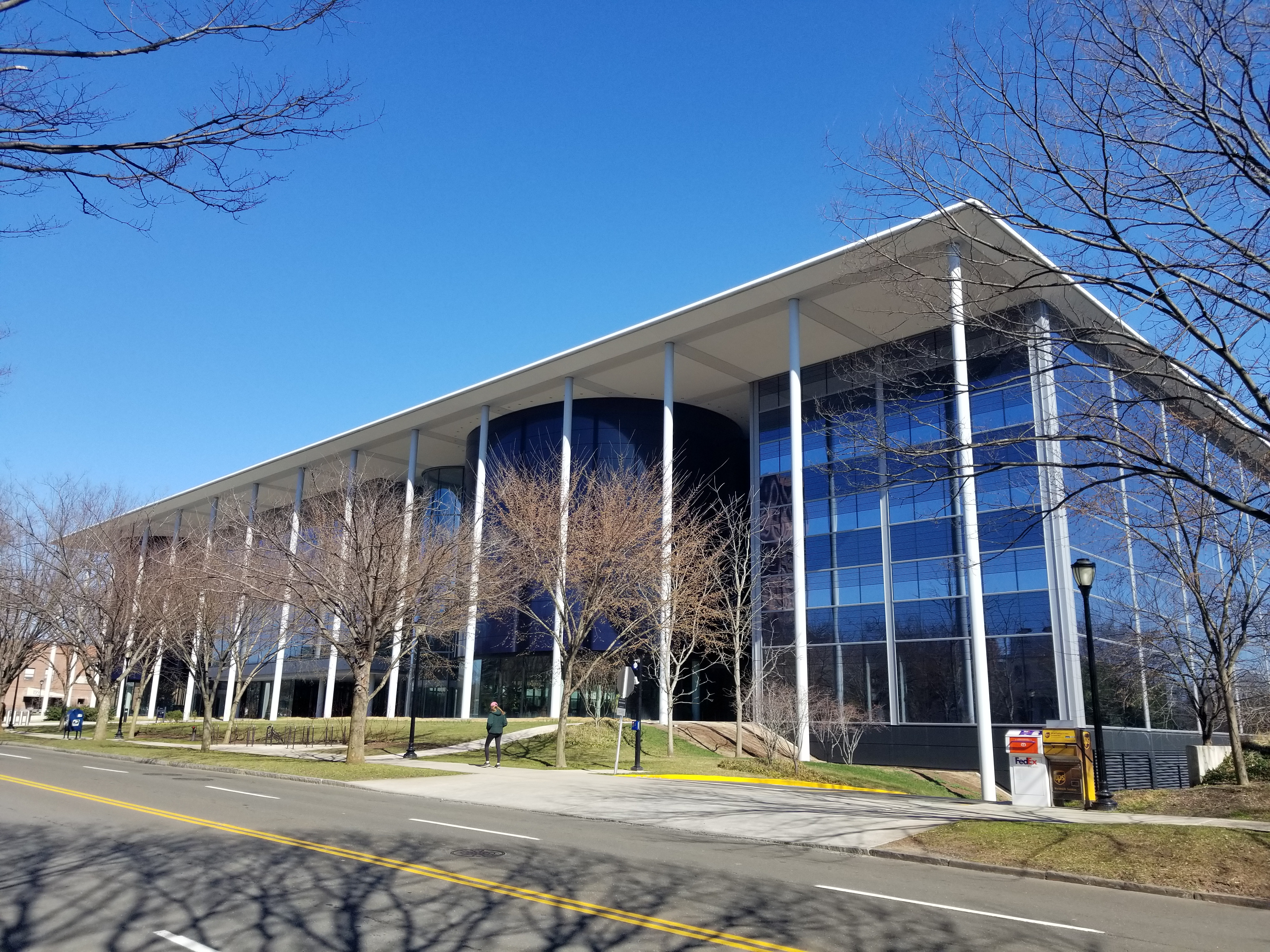
Evans Hall in New Haven, campus of Yale School of Management.

Edward P. Evans, also known as Ned Evans, (January 31, 1942 – December 31, 2010) was an American heir, businessman, investor, horse breeder and philanthropist. He was the chairman and CEO of Macmillan Publishers from 1979 to 1989. He was the owner of Spring Hill Farm, a horse farm in Fauquier County, Virginia. He is the namesake of Edward P. Evans Hall, the main building at the Yale School of Management.

== Early life ==
Edward P. Evans was born on January 31, 1942, in Pittsburgh, Pennsylvania. His father, Thomas Mellon Evans, was a corporate raider, horse breeder and philanthropist. He had two brothers.

Evans was educated at the Phillips Academy. He earned a bachelor's degree from Yale University in 1964 and a master in business administration from the Harvard Business School in 1967.

== Business career ==
Evans began his career by working for his father. By the 1970s, he became the chairman and chief executive officer of one of his family businesses, H.K. Porter, Inc. He acquired 15% of Macmillan Publishers in 1979 and served as its chairman and CEO until 1989, when he sold it to the Maxwell Communication Corporation for $2.8 billion. He subsequently became an investor.

== Equine interests ==
Evans was the owner of Spring Hill Farm, a 2,800-acre horse farm near Casanova in Fauquier County, Virginia. His 250 horses included Saint Liam, Quality Road, Minstrella, Summer Colony and Gygistar. According to Glenn Petty of the Virginia Thoroughbred Association, "Since entering the business in the 1970’s, Evans (and a very few select partners over the years) has produced the earners of more than $75 million."

Evans was a member of The Jockey Club. According to The Blood-Horse, "He was recognized by the Thoroughbred Owners and Breeders Association as Virginia’s Breeder of the Year 10 times, most recently in 2010, and he was TOBA’s National Breeder of the Year in 2009."

== Death and legacy ==
Evans died of leukemia on December 31, 2010, at the Mount Sinai Hospital in New York City. Shortly before his death, Evans donated $50 million to the Yale School of Management at his alma mater, Yale University, where the Edward P. Evans Hall was named in his honor.
