= Newstead Farm =

Coordinates: 39.032681°N 77.849072°W

Newstead Farm is a thoroughbred horse breeding farm near Upperville, Virginia founded in 1936 by Taylor Hardin. Following Hardin's death in 1976, the farm was operated by a trust that included his son, Mark. The property was eventually sold to Bertram and Diana Firestone.

In July 2018 the Firestone family placed the estate on 353 acres up for sale with a price of $13,500,000 Per Bertram "... time marches on and we have slowed down our various pursuits. We feel it is time to turn the reins over to a new owner that will be able to use and enjoy the farm to its fullest capacity." The farm sold for $9.5 million in March 2020.
