= Mary West (businesswoman) =

American entrepreneur and philanthropist

- Born: 1945 or 1946 (age 80–81)
- Known for: co-founder, West Corporation
- Spouse: Gary West

Mary West (born 1945/46) is an American entrepreneur and philanthropist, the co-founder of West Corporation.

== Early life ==
Mary West has a high school diploma, but never attended college. She grew up in Miami, and moved to Omaha part way through high school.

== Career ==
In 1978, with her husband Gary, she co-founded WATS Telemarketing in the garage of their house in Omaha, Nebraska. They sold WATS in 1980 and in 1986 she founded West TeleServices which they took public in 1996.

In 2008, she and her husband had a combined net worth of $2.2 billion.

She owned 10% of West Corporation, a publicly traded telecommunications services provider headquartered in Omaha which was taken private in 2017 as a subsidiary of Apollo Global Management .

== Philanthropy ==
They have given away in excess of $400 million to "senior citizen wellness and cutting the nation's health care costs".

== Personal life ==
She is married to Gary West, and they live in San Diego. The Wests own Thoroughbred racing horses Maximum Security, Game Winner, and New Year's Day.
