= Frank Gomez Memorial Stakes =

Discontinued Stakes race
- Location: Calder Race Course; Miami Gardens, Florida
- Inaugurated: 1972
- Race type: Thoroughbred - Flat racing

Race information
- Distance: 5½ furlongs
- Surface: Dirt
- Track: left-handed
- Qualification: Two-years-old
- Weight: Assigned
- Purse: $100,000

The Frank Gomez Memorial Stakes was an American Thoroughbred horse race open to two-year-horses of either sex that was held annually at Calder Race Course in Miami Gardens, Florida from 1972 through 2013.

== History ==
Inaugurated as the Criterium Stakes, following the December 23, 2007 death of Calder Race Course Hall of Fame trainer Frank Gomez, the race was renamed in his honor.

In 2000, the race became part of the "Summit of Speed" stakes series. In 2013, National Museum of Racing and Hall of Fame inductee and future U. S. Triple Crown winner Mike Smith rode Yes I'm Lucky to victory in what would turn out to be the final running of the Frank Gomez Memorial Stakes. The following year the "Summit of Speed" stakes series was canceled when Calder's racing operations were leased to the Stronach Group, operators of Gulfstream Park, who did not pick up this race when the series resumed in 2015.

The race was run in two divisions in 1958, 1960 and 1963.

Chronology of race names:

- Frank Gomez Memorial Stakes : 2008-2013
- Criterium Stakes : 1972-2008

Race distances:

- 5.5 furlongs : 1981-1985, 1992-2004, 2010-2013
- 6 furlongs : 1979-1980, 1986-1991, 2005-2009
- 1 mile (8 furlongs) : 1972-1978

== Records ==
Speed record:

- At 5 ½ furlongs : 104.88 by Devil's Disciple in 2004
- At 6 furlongs : 1:10.67 by in Rummy King in 2005
- At 1 mile (8 furlongs) : 1:38 flat by Champion Du Nord in 1976

Most wins by a jockey:

- 3 - Eduardo O. Nunez (1989, 2005, 2012)
- 3 - Abel Castellano Jr. (2001, 2002, 2006)

Most wins by a trainer:

- 5 - Manuel J. Azpurua (1981, 1994, 1995, 2000, 2003)

Most wins by an owner:

- 2 - S. G. Stable (1994, 1995)
- 2 - Jacks or Better Farm, Inc. (2002, 2009)
- 2 - Trilogy Stable (2006, 2013)
- 2 - J. Robert Harris III (2008, 2011)

== Winners ==
Year	Winner	Jockey	Trainer	Owner	Dist. (F)	Time	Win$
2013	Yes I'm Lucky	Mike E. Smith	Edward Plesa, Jr.	Trilogy Stable & Laurie Plesa	51/2 F	1:06.35	$60,000
2012	Two Ts At Two B	Eduardo O. Nunez	Kathleen O'Connell	Gilbert Campbell	51/2 F	1:06.56	$60,000
2011	Mel Beach	Orlando Bocachica	Edward Plesa, Jr.	J. Robert Harris III	51/2 F	1:07.01	$60,000
2010	Little Drama	Eibar Coa	David J. Fawkes	Harold L. Queen	51/2 F	1:05.59	$60,000
2009	Jackson Bend	Jeffrey Sanchez	Stanley I. Gold	Jacks or Better Farm, Inc.	6 F	1:12.19	$60,000
2008	Red Nation	Orlando Bocachica	Edward Plesa, Jr.	J. Robert Harris III	6 F	1:13.30	$60,000
2007	Big City Man	Elvis Trujillo	Jose M. Pinchin	Mr. T Stables	6 F	1:12.14	$60,000
2006	Yesbyjimminy	Abel Castellano, Jr.	Edward Plesa, Jr.	Trilogy Stables	6 F	1:11.39	$60,000
2005	Gin Rummy King	Eduardo O. Nunez	David A. Vivian	Dominic Vittese	6 F	1:10.67	$60,000
2004	Devil's Disciple	Rosemary Homeister Jr.	Joseph J. Waunsch	John Somers	51/2 F	1:04.88	$60,000
2003	Sir Oscar	Julio Garcia	Manuel J. Azpurua	Oscar Novo	51/2 F	1:05.55	$60,000
2002	Hear No Evil	Abel Castellano, Jr.	James P. Hatchett	Jacks or Better Farm, Inc.	51/2 F	1:06.02	$60,000
2001	Juggernaut	Abel Castellano, Jr.	Larry Pilotti	Siobhan P. Ellison	51/2 F	1:06.79	$60,000
2000	Jacksrbetter	Daniel Coa	Manuel J. Azpurua	Gary Aiken	51/2 F	1:07.08	$60,000
1999	Bally Ho	Rene Douglas	Luis Olivares	Three G Stable	51/2 F	1:06.24	$30,000
1998	B L'S Sweep	Javier Castellano	Larry Pilotti	Monarch Stable, Inc.	51/2 F	1:07.06	$30,000
1997	Don'tcallmeacowboy	Enrique M. Jurado	Steven W. Standridge	Francis W. Lucas	51/2 F	1:07.00	$30,000
1996	Blount Island	Dale Beckner	Emanuel Tortora	James Lewis, Jr.	51/2 F	1:05.40	$30,000
1995	Classic Intuition	Jorge Duarte	Manuel J. Azpurua	S. G. Stable	51/2 F	1:06.80	$30,000
1994	The Frog Man	Pedro Monterrey Jr.	Manuel J. Azpurua	S. G. Stable	51/2 F	1:06.60	$30,000
1993	Air Mike	Eibar Coa	Luis Olivares	Marissa Olivares	51/2 F	1:05.80	$30,000
1992	Thirty Two Slew	Michael Lee	Rene Mendez	Gloria J. Kenny	51/2 F	1:05.64	$30,000
1991	D. J. Cat	Heberto Castillo Jr.	Happy Alter	Alter's Racing Stable, Inc.	6 F	1:12.60	$33,420
1990	Franklin Me	Steve Gaffalione	Glenn M. Stanchfield	Diane Eldredge	6 F	1:13.00	$23,430
1989	Krikiti	Eduardo O. Nunez	Alberto Paz-Rodriguez	San Stud Gabriel	6 F	1:12.80	$26,700
1988	Valid Space	Jose A. Velez, Jr.	Richard R. Root	Harry T. Mangurian Jr.	6 F	1:13.20	$27,910
1987	Lover's Trust	Wesley A. Ward	Robert M. Triola	Robert M. Triola	6 F	1:12.60	$33,840
1986	Rainbow East	Octavio B. Aviles	Newcomb Green	Aronow Stable	6 F	1:12.60	$28,050
1985	Kid Colin	Omar Londono	Frank A. Alexander	Barry K. Schwartz	51/2 F	1:06.60	$33,690
1984-1	Cameo King	Santiago Soto	Nick Gianos, Jr.	Nick Gianos, Jr.	51/2 F	1:07.60	$24,345
1984-2	Smile	Gene St. Leon	Frank Gomez	Frances A. Genter Stable	51/2 F	1:07.00	$24,195
1983	Fortunate Prospect	Mary Russ	Carl D. Armbrister	Retreat Stable/Mike N. Sherman	51/2 F	1:06.80	$17,265
1982	El Kaiser	Chuck Baltazar	Larry Lyons	Pony Horse Stable	51/2 F	1:05.00	$16,380
1981	Marshaller	Felix Ferrer	Manuel J. Azpurua	Carlota Stable	51/2 F	1:13.40	$16,575
1980	Silent Stepper	Santiago Soto	Juan A. Sanchez	Mephisto Stable	6 F	1:13.00	$17,190
1979	She Can't Miss	Walter Guerra	Frank Gomez	Elcee H. Stable	6 F	1:11.20	$16,575
1978-1	Cherry Pop	Ocatavio Vergara	Jose A. Mendez	C & B Stable	8 F	1:40.20	$17,700
1978-2	Solo Haina	Octavio B. Aviles	Larry Geiger	Guy H. Burt	8 F	1:40.80	$17,700
1977	Galimore	Jesus S. Rodriguez	Jose A. Mendez	Green & Rennert, Inc.	8 F	1:38.80	$25,830
1976	Champion du Nord	Miguel A. Rivera	Alfred A. Scotti	Emanuel Mittman	8 F	1:38.00	$26,040
1975	Embajador	Carlos Astorga	Leo Sierra	Sol-Gar Stable	8 F	1:39.40	$26,670
1974	Famed Diplomat	William Nemeti	Frank J. McManus	R. M. Curtis	8 F	1:38.40	$10,000
1973	Friendly Bee	Sam Maple	Michael V. D'Amelio	Susan E. Fiore	8 F	1:42.20	$11,790
1972	Farm Time	D. Hidalgo	Sam B. David, Jr.	Albert Ponn	8 F	1:42.20	$9,980
