= Spend a Buck Handicap =

Spend A Buck Handicap
- Class: Discontinued Grade 3 stakes
- Location: Calder Race Course; Miami Gardens, Florida, United States
- Inaugurated: 1991
- Race type: Thoroughbred – Flat racing

Race information
- Distance: 1 1/16 miles (8.5 furlongs)
- Surface: Dirt
- Track: left-handed
- Qualification: Three-years-old & up
- Weight: Assigned
- Purse: $100,000

The Spend A Buck Handicap was an American Grade III Thoroughbred horse race run between 1991 and 2012 at Calder Race Course in Miami Gardens, Florida. Open to horses age three and older, it was contested on dirt over a distance of 1 1/16 miles (8.5 furlongs).

The race was named in honor of Spend a Buck, winner of the 1985 Kentucky Derby and a Calder Race Course Hall of Fame inductee. Since inception the race has been contested at various distances and under different conditions:

- 1 1/16 miles : 1991, 1997–present
- 1 mile, 70 yards : 1992, run as the Spend A Buck Overnight Handicap for three-year-olds
- 1 1/8 miles: 1994–1996

== Records ==
Speed record: (at current distance of 1 1/16 miles)

- 1:42.59 – Best of the Rest (2001)

Most wins:

- 2 – Best of the Rest (1999, 2001)
- 2 – Mad Flatter (2010, 2011)

Most wins by a jockey:

- 3 – Eibar Coa (1999, 2001, 2004)

Most wins by a trainer:

- 2 – Martin D. Wolfson (1998, 2008)
- 2 – Edward Plesa Jr. (1999, 2001)
- 2 – Jeffrey Thornbury (2010, 2011)

Most wins by an owner:

- 2 – Bea Oxenberg (1999, 2001)

== Winners ==
Year	Winner	Age	Jockey	Trainer	Owner	Dist. (Miles)	Time	Win $	Gr.
2012	Cash Rules	5	Luis Saez	David Fawkes	Larry Fugate	1-1/16 m	1:46.99	$61,380	G3
2011	Mad Flatter	6	Jon Court	Jeffrey Thornbury	Bonnie Heath Farm (Kim Heath)	1-1/16 m	1:46.07	$60,760	G3
2010	Mad Flatter	5	Jon Court	Jeffrey Thornbury	Bonnie Heath Farm, Holiday Stable, Bright Brook Farm, Hinkle Farms	1-1/16 m	1:46.37	$59,520	G3
2009	Mambo Meister	4	Manoel Cruz	Philip A. Gleaves	Quantum Racing Team	1-1/16 m	1:46.85	$61,814	G3
2008	It's a Bird	5	Jermaine Bridgmohan	Martin D. Wolfson	Edmund A. Gann	1-1/16 m	1:46.40	$59,520	G3
2007	Yes He's the Man	4	Julio A. Garcia	J. David Braddy	J. David Braddy & Joel Sainer	1-1/16 m	1:45.14	$58,280	G3
2006	Nkosi Reigns	5	Jeffrey Sanchez	Ronald B. Spatz	Carson Springs Farm (Christine K. Janks)	1-1/16 m	1:45.40	$60,000	G3
2005	Supervisor	5	Aurelio Toribio Jr.	Emanuel Tortora	Rodney G. Lundock	1-1/16 m	1:46.94	$60,000	G3
2004	Built Up	6	Eibar Coa	Enrique Alonso	Raymond Susi	1-1/16 m	1:45.86	$60,000	G3
2003	Tour Of The Cat	5	Abad Cabassa Jr.	Myra Mora	Double G Stables LLC (Olivia Golden)	1-1/16 m	1:46.30	$60,000	G3
2002	Pay The Preacher	4	Cornelio Velásquez	Robert A. Hale	Rosamond Davis	1-1/16 m	1:44.91	$60,000	
2001	Best of the Rest	6	Eibar Coa	Edward Plesa Jr.	Bea Oxenberg	1-1/16 m	1:42.59	$60,000	
2000	Groomstick Stock's	4	Rosemary Homeister	Paul Brettler	Julian DeMora	1-1/16 m	1:44.82	$60,000	
1999	Best of the Rest	4	Eibar Coa	Edward Plesa Jr.	Bea Oxenberg	1-1/16 m	1:44.67	$60,000	
1998	Unruled	5	Gary Boulanger	Martin D. Wolfson	L. William Heiligbrodt & Jack T. Hammer	1-1/16 m	1:45.60	$60,000	
1997	Derivative	6	José C. Ferrer	James E. Bracken	Tartan Stable	1-1/16 m	1:45.60	$30,000	
1996	King Rex	4	Ricardo Lopez	Laura Posada	Peter A. Tamburo	1-1/8 m	1:52.80	$48,945	
1995	Pride of Burkaan	5	René Douglas	Ralph Ziadie	Robert Johnson & Glenn Murchison	1-1/8 m	1:51.80	$60,000	
1994	Daniel's Boy	6	Pedro Rodriguez	Jose Abdale	Alvin Deloach	1-1/8 m	1:52.60	$60,000	
1993	Race not held								
1992 †	Poulain D'Or	3	Pedro Rodriguez	Daniel Hurtak	Frances W. Ballou	1m, 70 yds.	1:42.20	$14,000	
1991	Higgler	3	Danny Nied	Frank Gomez	Leverett S. Miller	1-1/16 m	1:48.20	$50,505	

- † In 1992 the race was run as the Spend a Buck Overnight Handicap for three-year-olds.
