= James E. Bracken =

American racehorse trainer

Personal information
- Born: March 12, 1918 Charleston, Missouri, USA
- Died: April 19, 2008 (aged 90)
- Occupation: Trainer

Horse racing career
- Sport: Horse racing
- Career wins: 1,271

Major racing wins
- Memorial Day Handicap (1976, 1988, 1990); Calder Derby (1982, 1987); Desert Vixen Stakes (1983, 1994); My Dear Girl Stakes (1983, 1985, 1993); Suwannee River Handicap (1985); Tropical Turf Handicap (1985); What A Pleasure Stakes (1986); Carry Back Stakes (1987, 1995); Needles Stakes (1987); Fairmount Derby (1988); Thanksgiving Day Handicap (1988, 1989, 1990, 1997); Broward Handicap (1990); Donn Handicap (1990); Fred W. Hooper Handicap (1990); Calcutta Cup Handicap (1993); Foolish Pleasure Stakes (1993, 1994); Three Ring Stakes (1993); Azalea Stakes (1994); Davona Dale Stakes (1994); Noble Royalty Stakes (1994); Plantation Handicap (1994); Susan's Girl Stakes (1994); Dade County Stakes (1995); Glitterman Handicap (1995); Emerald Dunes Handicap (1995); Kenny Noe, Jr. Handicap (1995); Pete Axthelm Handicap (1995); Shocker T. Handicap (1995); Melaleuca Stakes (1996); Spend A Buck Handicap (1997)

Racing awards
- Calder Champion Trainer (1984, 1985); Tropical Park Champion Trainer (1985, 1990)

Honours
- Calder Race Course Hall of Fame (2000)

Significant horses
- Primal, Cut The Charm, Cottage Flower, Final Reunion, Early Lunch, Ponche, Derivative

James E. Bracken (March 12, 1918 – April 19, 2008) was an American Thoroughbred horse racing trainer based in Florida.

== Background ==
Bracken began his career in horse racing in 1935 at Jefferson Downs Racetrack in New Orleans. He began as a galloper before becoming a jockey, and while that did not last long he was able to become a jockey agent. Among his clients were several future Hall of Fame inductees including John Adams, Bill Hartack, Bill Shoemaker, Jacinto Vásquez and Walter Blum.

In 1976, at age 48, Bracken embarked on a career that would see him earn Calder Race Course Hall of Fame honors.
