= Miami Mile Stakes =

- Class: Discontinued stakes
- Location: Gulfstream Park; Hallandale Beach, Florida, United States
- Inaugurated: 1987 (as Miami Breeders' Cup Handicap at Calder Race Course)
- Final run: 2017
- Race type: Thoroughbred – Flat racing

Race information
- Distance: 1 mile (8 furlongs)
- Surface: Turf
- Track: Left-handed
- Qualification: Three-year-olds & older
- Weight: Assigned
- Purse: US$100,000

The Miami Mile Stakes was an American Thoroughbred horse race once run annually during the last week of April at Calder Race Course in Miami Gardens, Florida. Open to horses age three and older, it was contested on turf over a distance of 1 mile (8 furlongs). The last running was in 2017.

Inaugurated as the Miami Breeders' Cup Handicap in 1987, it has been raced at various distances:

- About 1 1/8 miles: 1987–1989, 1992–1993
- 1 1/8 miles : 1990–1991, 1994–1996
- 1 mile : 1997–present

The race was run on dirt in 1990 and 1991. In 2003, the race also had to be shifted from the turf to the dirt due to weather considerations but maintained its Grade III status.

In 2015, this race began to run at Gulfstream Park.

== Records ==
Speed record: (at current distance of 1 mile)

- 1:33.01 – Smokem Kitten (2016)

Most wins:

- 2 – Simply Majestic (1988, 1989)
- 2 – Band Is Passing (2000, 2002)

Most wins by an owner:

- 2 – Ted Sabarese (1988, 1989)
- 2 – Stanley M. Ersoff (2000, 2002)

Most wins by a jockey:

- 3 – Manoel Cruz (2005, 2008, 2010)
- 2 – Jerry Bailey (1988, 1992)
- 2 – José Ferrer (1996, 1997)
- 2 – Eduardo Nunez (1998, 2007)
- 2 – Javier Castellano (1999, 2009)

Most wins by a trainer:

- 3 – Martin D. Wolfson (1992, 1994, 1999)

== Winners ==
Year	Winner	Age	Jockey	Trainer	Owner	Time
2017	War Correspondent	7	Tyler Gaffalione	Christophe Clement	Calumet Farm/Sagamore Farm/Eclipse Thoroughbred Partners	1:34.39
2016	Smokem Kitten	4	Edgar S. Prado	Michael J. Maker	Sarah & Kenneth Ramsey	1:33.01
2015	Rerun	6	Jose C. Caraballo	Stewart Chad	World Thoroughbreds Racing	1:37.55
2014	Grand Tito	4	Antonio Sano	Santiago González	Grupo 7C Racing Stable	1:38.60
2013	Summer Front	4	Joe Bravo	Christophe Clement	Waterford Stable	1:35.31
2012	Imperial Czar	4	Jesus Rios	Saul Matos	Jessica Colon	1:39.86
2011	Successful Mission	5	Elvis Trujillo	Edward Plesa Jr.	Live Oak Plantation	1:35.01
2010	Mambo Meister	5	Manoel Cruz	Philip A. Gleaves	Quantum Racing Team #1, LLC	1:35.04
2009	Wesley	4	Javier Castellano	Mark A. Hennig	Reddam/Willmott Stable	1:36.31
2008	Soldiers Dancer	4	Manoel Cruz	David Vivian	Herman Heinlein	1:35.73
2007	Jet Propulsion	4	Eduardo Nunez	Daniel C. Hurtack	Dennis Punches	1:34.11
2006	Gigawatt	6	Chantal Sutherland	Michael Lerman	Steve Ramsey	1:34.50
2005	Bob's Proud Moment	4	Manoel Cruz	Douglas G. Potter	Robert M. Dubois	1:38.18
2004	Twilight Road	7	Phil Teator	David Fawkes	Donamire Farm	1:39.56
2003	Tour Of The Cat	5	Abad Cabassa Jr.	Myra Mora	Double G Stables	1:38.65
2002	Band Is Passing	6	Cornelio Velásquez	Stanley M. Ersoff	Stanley M. Ersoff	1:37.78
2001	Mr. Livingston	4	Abel Castellano Jr.	William A. Kaplan	Theresa & David Palmer	1:33.75
2000	Band Is Passing	4	Eibar Coa	Stanley M. Ersoff	Stanley M. Ersoff	1:37.28
1999	Sharp Appeal	6	Javier Castellano	Martin D. Wolfson	Martin Cherry	1:35.70
1998	Unite's Big Red	4	Eduardo Nunez	Randy Mills	Break Away Racing et al.	1:36.62
1997	Vilhelm	5	José Ferrer	Jacqueline Brittain	Keith C. Wold	1:36.67
1996	Satellite Nealski	3	José Ferrer	James Hatchett	Hickory Lane Farm	1:47.63
1995	Elite Jeblar	5	Earlie Fires	Milton W. Wolfson	N T S Stable et al.	1:47.67
1994	The Vid	4	René Douglas	Martin D. Wolfson	Joseph J. Sullivan	1:48.28
1993	Carterista	4	Michael Lee	Ronald B. Spatz	S. A. Of South Florida, Inc.	1:47.51
1992	Jodi's Sweetie	4	Jerry Bailey	Martin D. Wolfson	Group L	1:43.94
1991	Run Turn	4	Gene St. Leon	George Julian	Elsie A. & Tobias Julian	1:52.80
1990	Public Account	5	Pedro A. Rodriguez	George Gianos	S. Young Stables, Inc.	1:52.00
1989	Simply Majestic	5	Heberto Castillo Jr.	John Parisella	Ted Sabarese	1:48.60
1988	Simply Majestic	4	Jerry Bailey	John Parisella	Ted Sabarese	1:43.60
1987	Blazing Bart	3	José A. Santos	Happy Alter	Sara & David Burton	1:44.20
