= Stage Door Betty Handicap =

- Class: Discontinued Grade III stakes
- Location: Calder Race Course; Miami Gardens, Florida, United States
- Inaugurated: 2001
- Race type: Thoroughbred – Flat racing
- Website: www.calderracecourse.com

Race information
- Distance: 1 1/16 miles (8.5 furlongs)
- Surface: Dirt
- Track: Left-handed
- Qualification: Fillies & Mares, Three-years-old & up
- Weight: Assigned
- Purse: $100,000

The Stage Door Betty Handicap was an American Thoroughbred horse race run annually since 2001 at Calder Race Course in Miami Gardens, Florida. Open to Fillies and Mares, age three and older, it is contested on dirt over a distance of 1 1/16 miles (8.5 furlongs).

Run near the end of December, the race has had Grade III status since 2006. It is named for the filly Stage Door Betty to honor her owner, longtime South Florida horsewoman Betty Sessa who died in January 2001.

Along with two other stakes races, Calder Race Course canceled the 2008 running of the Stage Door Betty Handicap due to what track officials described as "continuing overpayment of purses during the current meet."

== Records ==
Speed record:

- 1:44.08 – Stormy Frolic (2002)

Most wins:

- No horse has won this race more than once.

Most wins by a jockey:

- 3 – Eibar Coa (2001, 2003, 2006)

Most wins by a trainer:

- No trainer has won this race more than once.

Most wins by an owner:

- No owner has won this race more than once.

== Winners ==
Year	Winner	Age	Jockey	Trainer	Owner	Time
2012	Angelica Zapata	4	Luis Saez	Ronald Pellegrini	Herman Van Den Broeck	1:44.86
2011	Toocleverforwords	5	Luis Saez	Martin D. Wolfson	Farnsworth Stables LLC	1:47.01
2010	no race					
2009	Sweet Repent	3	Manoel Cruz	David Braddy	Buongiorno A Tutti	1:46.91
2008	no race					
2007	Bayou's Lassie	4	Elvis Trujillo	Christophe Clement	Jacks Or Better Farm	1:46.16
2006	Take D' Tour	5	Eibar Coa	David Fawkes	Alice Muller	1:45.38
2005	Mocita	3	Eddie Castro	Martin D. Wolfson	David W. Hutson	1:48.56
2004	Personal Legend	4	Jerry Bailey	Robert J. Frankel	Edmund A. Gann	1:45.12
2003	Redoubled Miss	4	Eibar Coa	Ron Spatz	Centaur Farms	1:46.78
2002	Stormy Frolic	3	José A. Santos	Milton W. Wolfson	Stride Rite Racing	1:44.08
2001	Extend	3	Eibar Coa	Roger Attfield	Cam Allard	1:46.74
