= Memorial Day Handicap =

Former American Thoroughbred horse race

- Class: Discontinued stakes
- Location: Calder Race Course; Miami Gardens, Florida
- Inaugurated: 1971
- Race type: Thoroughbred – Flat racing
- Website: www.calderracecourse.com

Race information
- Distance: 1 1/16 miles (8.5 furlongs)
- Track: Dirt, left-handed
- Qualification: Three-years-old & up
- Weight: Assigned
- Purse: US$100,000

The Memorial Day Handicap was an American Thoroughbred horse race run annually from 1971 through 2014 at Calder Race Course in Miami Gardens, Florida. Held on Memorial Day, it was an ungraded stakes race that had earned Grade III status in 2002–2007 and 2009–2010. The race was open to horses age three and older and was last raced on dirt over a distance of 1 1/16 miles (8.5 furlongs).

With the Vietnam War officially ended on April 30, 1975, the race was run as the Empty Saddle Handicap, done to demonstrate the real meaning of Memorial Day with a salute to the fallen soldiers of American wars.

In 2014, Calder's racing operations were leased to the Stronach Group, operators of Gulfstream Park, when Csaba won the race with Manoel Cruz in the saddle. Stronach Group did not pick up this race for their 2015 program.

== Records ==
Speed record:

- 1 1/16 miles on dirt : 1:44.59 by Where's Sterling in 2012
- 1 1/16 miles on turf : 1:40.80 by Born Mighty in 1998

Most wins by a jockey:

- 4 – Gene St. Leon (1974, 1975, 1977, 1988)

Most wins by a trainer:

- 3 – James E. Bracken (1976, 1988, 1990)
- 3 – Philip A. Gleaves (2010, 2013, 2014)

Most wins by an owner:

- 3 – Tartan Stable (1972, 1988, 1990)
- 2 – Donamire Farm (2004, 2005)
- 2 – Rolbea Thoroughbred Racing LLC (2008, 2009)
- 2 – Bruce Hollander & Cary Shapoff (2013, 2014)

== Winners ==
Year	Winner	Age	Jockey	Trainer	Owner	Dist. (M)	Surface	Time	Win$
2014	Csaba	5	Manoel Cruz	Philip A. Gleaves	Bruce Hollander & Cary Shapoff	11/16 M	dirt	1:47.17	$45,000
2013	Csaba	4	Manoel Cruz	Philip A. Gleaves	Bruce Hollander & Cary Shapoff	11/16 M	dirt	1:46.20	$45,000
2012	Where's Sterling	5	Juan N. Delgado	Luis M. Ramirez	Frank C. Calabrese	11/16 M	dirt	1:44.59	$45,000
2011	Motovato	6	Luis Saez	Martin D. Wolfson	Team Valor International & Gary Barber	11/16 M	dirt	1:46.48	$45,000
2010	Mambo Meister	5	Manoel Cruz	Philip A. Gleaves	Quantum Racing Team	11/16 M	dirt	1:45.70	$60,000
2009	Finallymadeit	5	Eduardo O. Nunez	Javier Negrete	Rolbea Thoroughbred Racing LLC	11/16 M	dirt	1:45.55	$60,000
2008	Finallymadeit	4	Eduardo O. Nunez	Javier Negrete	Rolbea Thoroughbred Racing LLC	11/16 M	dirt	1:47.10	$23,000
2007	Dry Martini	4	Elvis Trujillo	Harry Benson	Carol & George Nyren	11/16 M	dirt	1:46.41	$60,000
2006	Siphon City	4	Elvis Trujillo	Daniel C. Hurtak	Ray Larkin	11/16 M	dirt	1:45.87	$60,000
2005	Twilight Road	8	Phil Teator	David J. Fawkes	Donamire Farm	11/16 M	dirt	1:47.71	$60,000
2004	Twilight Road	7	Phil Teator	David J. Fawkes	Donamire Farm	11/16 M	dirt	1:45.79	$60,000
2003	Dancing Guy	8	Roger I. Velez	Newcomb Green	Newcomb Green	11/16 M	dirt	1:45.56	$60,000
2002	Best Of The Rest	7	Cornelio Velásquez	Edward Plesa Jr.	Beatrice Oxenberg	11/16 M	dirt	1:44.75	$60,000
2001	Hal's Hope	4	Roger I. Velez	Harold J. Rose	Rose Family Stable	11/16 M	dirt	1:45.81	$45,000
2000	Dancing Guy	5	José C. Ferrer	Newcomb Green	Frances Green	11/16 M	dirt	1:46.28	$45,000
1999	Wicapi	7	Eibar Coa	Joseph G. Calascibetta	Acclaimed Racing Stable	11/16 M	dirt	1:46.79	$45,000
1998	Born Mighty	4	José Alberto Rivera II	William P. White	Judson Van Worp	11/16 M	turf	1:40.80	$30,000
1997	Vilhelm	5	José C. Ferrer	Jacqueline A. Brittain	Keith C. Wold	11/16 M	turf	1:40.80	$30,000
1996	Marcie's Ensign	4	Eibar Coa	Luis Olivares	Cobble View Stable	11/8 M	dirt	1:50.00	$30,000
1995	Mr. Light Tres	6	Kristi L. Chapman	Carl A. Nafzger	James B. Tafel & Gardner Landon	11/8 M	turf	1:47.00	$30,000
1994	Final Sunrise	4	Pedro A. Rodriguez	Luis Olivares	J. K. Arriola & K. Barket Jr.	11/8 M	dirt	1:51.80	$30,000
1993	Boots 'n Buck	4	Mary Russ	Emanuel Tortora	Bee Bee Stables, Inc. & Toni Tortora	11/8 M	dirt	1:53.80	$30,000
1992	Jodi's Sweetie	4	Jorge C. Duarte	Martin D. Wolfson	Leslie Alexander	11/8 M±	turf	1:44.20	$30,000
1991	S. W. Wildcard	5	Pedro A. Rodriguez	George Gianos	Willis Family Stables, Inc.	11/16 M	dirt	1:46.80	$34,110
1990	Primal	5	Heberto Castillo Jr.	James E. Bracken	Tartan Stable	11/16 M	dirt	1:47.40	$33,180
1989	Hooting Star	4	José A. Vélez Jr.	Ralph Ziadie	Power House Racing Stable, Inc.	11/16 M	turf	1:41.20	$33,300
1988	Billie Osage	4	Gene St. Leon	James E. Bracken	Tartan Stable	11/16 M	dirt	1:46.20	$33,150
1987	no race								
1986	no race								
1985	Rexson's Hope	4	Gary W. Bain	Harold J. Rose	Elsie A. Rose Stable, Inc.	1M, 70 yds	dirt	1:43.60	$33,660
1984	no race								
1983	Bolivar	6	Santiago B. Soto	Thomas S. Young	Thomas S. Young	11/16 M	dirt	1:46.20	$23,700
1982	Two's A Plenty	5	Alfredo Smith Jr.	Merritt A. Buxton	Mrs. A. W. Smith/Charles Largay/M. A. Buxton	11/16 M	dirt	1:45.40	$19,470
1981	no race								
1980	Poverty Boy	5	Martin Fromin	William A. Cole	Karil Vangeloff	11/16 M	dirt	1:45.60	$20,565
1979	Great Sound	5	Walter Guerra	Merritt A. Buxton	Universal Thoroughbred, Inc.	11/16 M	turf	1:45.40	$20,835
1978	One Moment	5	John Giovanni	Stanley M. Hough	A. Destout	11/8 M	dirt	1:52.20	$21,240
1977	Lightning Thrust	4	Gene St. Leon	Stanley M. Hough	Stirrup Hill Farm	11/8 M±	turf	1:45.80	$21,780
1976	Freepet	6	Ray Broussard	James E. Bracken	J. W. LaCroix	11/8 M	dirt	1:53.80	$20,700
1975	Plagiarize	4	Gene St. Leon	Reed M. Combest	Mr. & Mrs. Lewis E. Iandoli	11/16 M	dirt	1:45.80	$13,800
1974	Snurb	4	Gene St. Leon	Reed M. Combest	B.L.T. Stable	11/16 M	dirt	1:46.20	$14,040
1973	Correbtoso	6	Roger M. Danjean	Wayne E. Opperman	Peppermint Farm	11/16 M	dirt	1:47.80	$10,620
1972	Willmar	4	Kenny Knapp	Frank Gomez	Tartan Stable	11/16 M	dirt	1:45.20	$9,600
1971	Anchorage	4	James Moseley	Harry Trotsek	L. W. Stellings	1 M	dirt	1:39.00	$6,600
