= Frances A. Genter Stakes =

- Class: Grade III
- Location: Calder Race Course; Miami Gardens, Florida
- Inaugurated: 1993
- Race type: Thoroughbred — Flat racing
- Website: www.calderracecourse.com

Race information
- Distance: 7 1/2 furlongs
- Surface: Turf
- Track: Left-handed
- Qualification: Three-year-old fillies
- Weight: Assigned
- Purse: $100,000

The Frances A. Genter Stakes is an American Thoroughbred horse race run annually at the end of December at Calder Race Course in Miami Gardens, Florida. Contested on turf over a distance of 7 1/2 furlongs, the Grade III event is open to three-year-old fillies.

Inaugurated in 1993 as the Frances A. Genter Handicap in honor of longtime Thoroughbred owner Frances A. Genter—whose best-known horse was Florida-bred Unbridled, the winner of the 1990 Florida Derby who went on to win that year's Kentucky Derby and Breeders' Cup Classic.

The Frances A. Genter Stakes was contested at a distance of one mile in 1994 and was run in two divisions in 2000.

Due to financial pressure, Calder has announced the cancellation of this race for 2008 and possibly longer.

== Records ==
Speed record:

- 1:27.07 – Laurafina (2005)

Most wins by an owner:

- No owner has won this race more than once.

Most wins by a jockey:

- 3 – René Douglas (1993, 2000, 2007)
- 3 – Abdiel Toribio (1994, 1995, 1997)

Most wins by a trainer:

- 3 – Christophe Clement (1999, 2000, 2007)

== Winners of the Frances A. Genter Stakes ==
Year	Winner	Jockey	Trainer	Owner	Time
2008	Race canceled				
2007	Rutherienne	René Douglas	Christophe Clement	Virginia Kraft Payson	1:28.16
2006	Bayou's Lassie	Elvis Trujillo	Stanley Gold	Jacks or Better Farm	1:29.37
2005	Laurafina	Rafael Bejarano	Robert Barbara	Sabine Stable	1:27.07
2004	R Obsession	Manoel Cruz	Timothy Ritvo	A. Kales Company	1:28.05
2003	Changing World	Joe Bravo	Barclay Tagg	Samuel H. Rogers	1:27.67
2002	Cellars Shiraz	Eibar Coa	William Cesare	Bitterroot Investments	1:29.45
2001	Amelia	Javier Castellano	C. R. McGaughey III	H. Groves, H. & D. Alexander	1:28.56
2000	Laurica	José Ferrer	John H. Forbes	G. Thompson/J. Velsor	1:29.88
2000	Zeiting	René Douglas	Christophe Clement	Brendon Hayes	1:30.08
1999	Seducer	José Santos	Christophe Clement	S. & C. Harris/Peter Karches	1:28.67
1998	Justenuffheart	Eibar Coa	Marty D. Wolfson	Frank Calabrese	1:28.60
1997	Oh My Butterfly	Abdiel Toribio	Emanuel Tortora	Bee Bee Stable, Inc.	1:28.40
1996	Voy Si No	Eduardo Núñez	Leo J. Azpurua Jr.	Stud El Pulpo	1:28.00
1995	Majestic Dy	Abdiel Toribio	Marty D. Wolfson	W.W. Brown & D. Connors	1:27.80
1994	Clean Wager	Abdiel Toribio	Jacqueline Brittain	Diane Flowers	1:39.80
1993	Putthepowdertoit	René Douglas	Vincent Blengs	R. Sullivan & L. Pomerantz	1:28.60
