= Red Bank Stakes =

- Class: Listed Stakes
- Location: Monmouth Park Racetrack; Oceanport, New Jersey, United States
- Inaugurated: 1974
- Race type: Thoroughbred – Flat racing
- Website: Monmouth Park Racetrack

Race information
- Distance: 1 mile (8 furlongs)
- Surface: Turf
- Track: Left-handed
- Qualification: Three-year-olds and older
- Weight: Assigned
- Purse: $150,000 (2021)

The Red Bank Stakes is a Listed Stakes American Thoroughbred horse race for horses age three and older contested at a distance of one mile (8 furlongs) on turf held annually at Monmouth Park Racetrack in Oceanport, New Jersey.

== History ==
An earlier version of the Red Bank Stakes was run between 1882–93. In 1885 as a six-furlong race for two-year-olds. It was won by A. J. Cassatt's, The Bard.

The current rendition was inaugurated in 1974 as a stakes race on dirt for two-year-old fillies, in 1975 it was made open to fillies and mares. In 1980, the race was converted to a handicap event on turf which was open to horses age three and older.

When conditions are too wet the on discretion has moved the event to the dirt track.

The Red Bank Handicap was run in two divisions in 1984 and 1985.

In 2021 the event was downgraded to a Listed event.

=== Distance ===
Since inception the race has been contested at various distances:

- 1 mile : 1980 to present
- 1 mile and 70 yards on dirt : 1976
- 1 1/16 miles on dirt : 1974–1975, 1977–1978
- 1 1/16 miles on turf : 1979

== Records ==
Speed record: (at current distance of 1 mile)

- 1:32.42 – Icy Atlantic (2007) (Stakes and Monmouth Park turf course record)

Most wins:

- 3 – Get Serious (2009, 2010, 2012)

Most wins by an owner:

- 3 – James Dinan/Phantom House Farm (2009, 2010, 2012)

Most wins by a jockey:

- 5 – Joe Bravo (2001, 2003, 2007, 2013, 2016)
- 3 – José C. Ferrer (1984, 1989, 1991)
- 3 – Pablo Fragoso (2009, 2010, 2012)
- 3 – Paco Lopez (2021, 2023, 2024)

Most wins by a trainer:

- 5 – Christophe Clement (1993, 1994, 1998, 2013, 2016)
- 3 – John Forbes (2009, 2010, 2012)

== Winners ==
Year	Winner	Age	Jockey	Trainer	Owner	Time	Purse	Grade
2025	Cugino	4	Samuel Marin	Claude R. McGaughey	West Point Thoroughbreds and Jimmy Kahig	1:34.52	$100,000	Listed
2024	He'spuregold	6	Paco Lopez	Kelly J. Breen	Roseland Farm Stable	1:36.10	$104,000	Listed
2023	St Anthony	4	Paco Lopez	Neil D. Drysdale	Alice Bamford	1:34.58	$102,000	Listed
2022	Winfromwithin	4	Carlos Rojas	Jorge Delgado	Lea Farms	1:34.50	$102,000	Listed
2021	Value Proposition	5	Paco Lopez	Chad Brown	Klaravich Stables	1:38.18	$150,000	Listed
2020	Analyze It	5	Joe Bravo	Chad Brown	William H. Lawrence	1:35.54	$152,500	III
2019	Divisidero	7	Julian Pimentel	Kelly Rubley	Gunpowder Farms LLC & Brereton C Jones	1:34.37	$147,500	III
2018	Synchrony	5	Joe Bravo	Michael Stidham	Pin Oak Stable	1:33.61	$104,000	III
2017	Irish Strait	5	Orlando Bocachica	Graham Motion	Isabelle de Tomaso	1:35.66	$100,000	III
2016	Middleburg	6	Joe Bravo	Christophe Clement	Mrs. & Mr. B. Firestone	1:33.62	$100,000	III
2015	Winning Cause	5	Abel Castellano Jr.	Todd Pletcher	Alto Racing	1:32.27	$100,000	III
2014	Hard Enough	4	Eddie Castro	Bobby S. Dibona	Peace Sign Stable	1:36.68	$103,000	III
2013	Za Approval	5	Joe Bravo	Christophe Clement	Live Oak Plantation, Florida	1:34.52	$111,000	III
2012	Get Serious	8	Pablo Fragoso	John Forbes	Dinan/Moore/Phantom House Farm	1:32.63	$100,000	III
2011	Race not held							
2010	Get Serious	6	Pablo Fragoso	John Forbes	Dinan/Moore/Phantom House Farm	1:32.37	$200,000	III
2009	Get Serious	5	Pablo Fragoso	John Forbes	Dinan/Moore/Phantom House Farm	1:33.02	$175,000	III
2008	Buffalo Man	4	Carlos Marquez Jr.	Cam Gambolati	Clint E. Glasscock et al.	1:33.05	$150,000	III
2007	Icy Atlantic	6	Joe Bravo	Todd Pletcher	James T. Scatuorchio	1:32.42	$150,000	III
2006	Miesque's Approval	7	Eddie Castro	Martin D. Wolfson	Live Oak Racing	1:33.36	$150,000	III
2005	American Freedom	6	José Vélez Jr.	Jamie Woodington	Freedom Acres Inc.	1:43.00	$165,000	III
2004	Burning Roma	6	Jesus Castanon	Heather Giglio	H. L. Queen	1:34.60	$100,000	III
2003	Just Le Facts	4	Joe Bravo	Dennis J. Manning	Mac Fehsenfeld	1:37.60	$100,000	Listed
2002	Key Lory	8	Harry Vega	Dennis J. Manning	Mac Fehsenfeld	1:35.80	$100,000	III
2001	Pavillon	7	Joe Bravo	Martin D. Wolfson	Rio Aventura Stables	1:36.20	$150,000	III
2000	Mi Narrow	6	Cornelio Velásquez	Edwin T. Broome	Lisa Hall	1:34.80	$150,000	III
1999	Inkatha	5	Heberto Castillo Jr.	William I. Mott	R. Gene Saith	1:33.80	$150,000	III
1998	Statesmanship	4	José A. Santos	Christophe Clement	Harris & Karches	1:35.00	$100,000	III
1997	Basqueian	6	Rick Wilson	Joe Orseno	Frank Stronach	1:35.20	$100,000	III
1996	Joker	4	José Vélez Jr.	Guadalupe Preciado	Joseph M. Imbesi	1:35.80	$100,000	III
1995	Dove Hunt	4	Herb McCauley	Neil J. Howard	William S. Farish III	1:33.80	$75,000	III
1994	Adam Smith	6	Julie Krone	Christophe Clement	Lord White	1:34.40	$75,000	III
1993	Adam Smith	5	Jean-Luc Samyn	Christophe Clement	Lord White	1:34.20	$75,000	III
1992	Daarik	5	Larry Saumell	Thomas J. Skiffington Jr.	Shadwell Stable	1:34.00	$75,000	III
1991	Double Booked	6	José C. Ferrer	Linda L. Rice	R. Gorham	1:33.20	$75,000	III
1990	Norquestor	4	Jean-Luc Samyn	Hubert Hine	S. C. Savin	1:36.00	$75,000	III
1989	Arlene's Valentine	4	José C. Ferrer	Daniel Perlsweig	A. London	1:40.20	$75,000	III
1988	Iron Courage	4	Herb McCauley	Harvey L. Vanier	Roncart & Vanier	1:35.40	$60,000	III
1987	Feeling Gallant	5	Chris Antley	James E. Picou	H. P. Link	1:37.20	$50,000	III
1986	¶ Mazatleca	6	Chris Antley	Alan E. Goldberg	B. Marcus	1:35.80	$50,000	III
†1985	Ends Well	4	Michael R. Morgan	Robert Reinacher Jr.	Greentree Stable	1:35.60	$40,000	Listed
†1985	Castelets	6	Vince Bracciale Jr.	Ronald Cartwright	Buckingham Farm	1:37.00	$40,000	Listed
†1984	Tough Mickey	4	Kenny Skinner	Philip G Johnson	M. Napolitano	1:36.40	$40,000	Listed
†1984	Castle Guard	5	José C. Ferrer	Harry M. Wells	Colonial Farm	1:35.80	$40,000	Listed
1983	Sun and Shine	4	J. Terry	Peter D. Pugh	Red Bank Farm	1:36.60	$40,000	Listed
1982	Alhambra Joe	5	William Nemeti	Patricia Riegler	Hyman Tobey	1:38.60	$35,000	Listed
1981	Colonel Moran	4	Gary Donahue	Thomas J. Kelly	Townsend B. Martin	1:35.20	$35,000	Listed
1980	Horatius	5	Don MacBeth	James W. Murphy	Philip J. Torsney	1:35.00	$35,000	Listed
1979	¶ Navajo Princess	5	Jacinto Vásquez	Douglas Dodson	Glen Oaks Farm	1:43.20	$30,000	Listed
1978	¶ Love Jenny	4	M. Gomez	Eugene Euster	R. A. Nixon	1:46.20	$40,000	Listed
1977	¶ Playin' Footsie	4	Ronald Ardoin	William I. Mott	B. Erickson	1:44.40	$40,000	Listed
1976	¶ Collegiate	4	Jimmy Edwards	Anthony J. Bardaro	Bright View Farm	1:40.20	$35,000	Listed
1975	¶ Kudara	4	Don MacBeth	Tom Harraway	Tinton Falls Stable	1:42.20		Listed
1974	¶ Mystery Mood	2	Jorge Tejeira	Joseph Pierce Jr.	W. P. Burke/J. H. Pierce Jr.	1:45.20		Listed

Legend:

Dirt 1 mile	Turf 1 mile	Idle
Dirt 1 mile and 70 yards	Turf 1 1/16 miles
Dirt 1 1/16 miles

Notes:
¶ Filly/Mare
† Run in Divisions
