= José C. Ferrer =

Puerto Rican jockey (born 1964)

Jose C. Ferrer
Personal information
- Born: March 31, 1964 (age 62) San Juan, Puerto Rico
- Occupation: Jockey

Horse racing career
- Sport: Horse racing
- Career wins: 4,800+ (ongoing)

Major racing wins
- Red Bank Stakes (1984, 1989, 1991); Monmouth Oaks (1990); Oceanport Stakes (1991); W. L. McKnight Handicap (1994); Cotillion Handicap (1995); Miami Mile Breeders' Cup Handicap (1996, 1997); Memorial Day Handicap (1997, 2000); Spend A Buck Handicap (1997); Calder Oaks (1998); Calder Derby (1999); Fred W. Hooper Handicap (1999); Miss Woodford Stakes (1999); Frances A. Genter Stakes (2000); Philip H. Iselin Handicap (2000, 2023); Spinaway Stakes (2000); Jersey Shore Breeders' Cup Stakes (2001); Matchmaker Stakes (2001); Salvator Mile Handicap (2001, 2002); Long Branch Stakes (2003); Sapling Stakes (2003); Sorority Stakes (2003); Tampa Bay Derby (2021); Salvator Mile Stakes (2021)

Racing awards
- George Woolf Memorial Jockey Award (2018)

Significant horses
- Double Book, City Zip, Derivative, Vilelm, Batique
- Updated on October 26, 2008

José C. Ferrer (born March 31, 1964, in San Juan, Puerto Rico) is a Puerto Rican jockey in Thoroughbred horse racing. He began riding in the United States in 1983 at Calder Race Course in Florida then at Monmouth Park and the Meadowlands Racetrack in New Jersey. On November 24, 1983, Ferrer became the first jockey to win five races on a single card at the Meadowlands.

José Ferrer was married for a time to jockey Rosemary Homeister, Jr.

José reached the 4,000-win milestone on Feb. 14, 2016, at Tampa Bay Downs.

In 2018 José Ferrer was voted the George Woolf Memorial Jockey Award, a prestigious honor voted on by thoroughbred horse racing jockeys in North America. It is given to a jockey who has demonstrated high standards of personal and professional conduct, on and off the racetrack.

== Year-end charts ==
Chart (2003–present)	Peak position
National Earnings List for Jockeys 2003	80
