= Fred W. Hooper Stakes =

- Class: Grade III
- Location: Gulfstream Park; Hallandale Beach, Florida, United States
- Inaugurated: 1986 (at Calder Race Track as Tropical Park Handicap)
- Race type: Thoroughbred – Flat racing
- Sponsor: Visit Lauderdale (since 2026)
- Website: Gulfstream Park

Race information
- Distance: 1 Mile
- Surface: Dirt
- Track: left-handed
- Qualification: Four-year-olds and older
- Weight: 124 lbs. with allowances
- Purse: $175,000 (since 2026)

The Fred W. Hooper Stakes is a Grade III American Thoroughbred horse race for four years olds and older at the distance of one mile on the dirt held annually in January at Gulfstream Park, Hallandale Beach, Florida. The event carries a purse of $175,000.

== History ==
It was inaugurated on 7 January 1986 as the Tropical Park Handicap and was run at Calder Race Course on turf at a distance of "about" 1 1/8 miles.

In 1987, it was switched to dirt and set at a distance of 1 3/16 miles. The race was run twice in 1988, the first time at a distance of 1 1/4 miles in March, the second time in December at a distance of 1 1/8 miles. Creme Fraiche won both editions, the first in track record time. The race remained at a distance of 1 1/8 miles until 2015 when it was shortened to one mile.

The event was upgraded to Grade III in 1992.

In 1997, the race was renamed in honor of the prominent Thoroughbred owner/breeder, Fred W. Hooper, who operated Circle H Farm, a horse breeding operation in Ocala, Florida. The race was not run in 2014, after which it was transferred to Gulfstream Park.

The event is run as part of the undercard for the Pegasus World Cup.

== Records ==
Speed record:

- 1 mile – 1:33.53 Tommy Macho (2016)
- 1 1/8 miles – 1:50.53 The Judge Sez Who

Margin:

- 8 1/2 lengths – Pies Prospect (2004)

Most wins:

- 2 – Creme Fraiche (1988, 1988)
- 2 – Csaba (2012, 2013)
- 2 – Tommy Macho (2016, 2018)

Most wins by a jockey:

- 6 – Luis Saez (2012, 2013, 2016, 2018, 2023, 2024)

Most wins by a trainer:

- 3 – Nick Zito (2004, 2005, 2006)
- 3 – William I. Mott (1994, 2022, 2026)

Most wins by an owner:

- 2 – Brushwood Stable (1988, 1988)
- 2 – Robert V. LaPenta (2004, 2005)
- 2 – Bruce Hollander & Cary Shapoff (2012, 2013)
- 2 – Paul P. Pompa Jr. (2016, 2018)
- 2 – Godolphin Racing (2022, 2026)

== Winners ==
Year	Winner	Age	Jockey	Trainer	Owner	Distance	Time	Purse	Grade	Ref
At Gulfstream Park – Fred W. Hooper Stakes
2026	Knightsbridge	5	Junior Alvarado	William I. Mott	Godolphin Racing	1 mile	1:35.12	$150,000	III	
2025	Little Vic	6	Leonel Reyes	Juan C. Avila	Victoria's Ranch	1 mile	1:36.52	$150,000	III	
2024	Tumbarumba	4	Luis Saez	Brian Lynch	Amerman Racing	1 mile	1:36.45	$150,000	III	
2023	Endorsed	7	Luis Saez	Michael J. Maker	Mark D. Breen	1 mile	1:35.67	$150,000	III	
2022	Speaker's Corner	4	Junior Alvarado	William I. Mott	Godolphin Racing	1 mile	1:35.26	$150,000	III	
2021	Performer	5	Joel Rosario	Claude R. McGaughey III	Phipps Stable and Claiborne Farm	1 mile	1:35.49	$150,000	III	
2020	Phat Man	6	Irad Ortiz Jr.	J. Kent Sweezey	Marianne Stribling, Force Five Racing & Two Rivers Racing Stable	1 mile	1:35.95	$150,000	III	
2019	Aztec Sense	6	Emisael Jaramillo	Jorge Navarro	Joseph E. Besecker	1 mile	1:36.22	$150,000	III	
2018	Tommy Macho	6	Luis Saez	Todd A. Pletcher	Paul P. Pompa Jr.	1 mile	1:36.10	$175,000	III	
2017	Bird Song	4	Julien R. Leparoux	Ian R. Wilkes	Marylou Whitney Stables	1 mile	1:36.07	$100,000	III	
2016	Tommy Macho	4	Luis Saez	Todd A. Pletcher	Paul P. Pompa Jr. & J Stables	1 mile	1:33.53	$100,000	III	
2015	Valid	5	Paco Lopez	Marcus J. Vitali	Crossed Sabres Farm	1 mile	1:36.35	$100,000	III	
2014	Race not held									
At Calder Race Track– Fred W. Hooper Handicap
2013	Csaba	4	Luis Saez	Philip A. Gleaves	Bruce Hollander & Cary Shapoff	1 1/8 miles	1:52.93	$100,000	III	
2012	Csaba	3	Luis Saez	Philip A. Gleaves	Bruce Hollander & Cary Shapoff	1 1/8 miles	1:52.93	$100,000	III	Dead heat
2012	Ducduc	6	Orlando Bocachica	Shivananda Parbhoo	Shivananda Racing	1 1/8 miles	1:52.93	$100,000	III	Dead heat
2011	Jimanator	5	Joe Bravo	Michael J. Trombetta	Three Diamonds Farm	1 1/8 miles	1:53.56	$100,000	III	
2010	Tackleberry	3	Javier Santiago	Luis Olivares	Luis Olivares	1 1/8 miles	1:54.42	$100,000	III	
2009	Race not held									
2008	Finallymadeit	4	Eduardo O. Nunez	Javier Negrete	Rolbea Thoroughbred Racing	1 1/8 miles	1:53.75	$100,000	III	
2007	Electrify	4	Elvis Trujillo	Edward Plesa Jr.	Padua Stables	1 1/8 miles	1:52.56	$100,000	III	
2006	Hesanoldsalt	3	Rafael Bejarano	Nicholas P. Zito	Live Oak Plantation	1 1/8 miles	1:51.87	$100,000	III	
2005	§ Andromeda's Hero	3	Rafael Bejarano	Nicholas P. Zito	Robert V. LaPenta	1 1/8 miles	1:53.46	$100,000	III	
2004	Pies Prospect	3	Edgar S. Prado	Nicholas P. Zito	Robert V. LaPenta	1 1/8 miles	1:50.74	$100,000	III	
2003	Predawn Raid	4	Jorge F. Chavez	Bennie F. Stutts Jr.	Mount Joy Stables	1 1/8 miles	1:52.47	$100,000	III	
2002	The Judge Sez Who	3	Cornelio Velasquez	Milton W. Wolfson	Sez Who Racing	1 1/8 miles	1:50.53	$100,000	III	
2001	Kiss a Native	4	Cornelio Velasquez	William P. White	John A. Franks	1 1/8 miles	1:51.05	$100,000	III	
2000	American Halo	4	Charleen Hunt	Angel M. Medina	Jose G. Paparoni	1 1/8 miles	1:51.68	$100,000	III	
1999	Dancing Guy	4	Jose C. Ferrer	Newcomb Green	Frances Green	1 1/8 miles	1:50.83	$100,000	III	
1998	Wicapi	6	Joe Bravo	Joseph G. Calascibetta	Acclaimed Racing Stable	1 1/8 miles	1:52.00	$100,000	III	
1997	Shrike	4	Jerry D. Bailey	Martin D. Wolfson	Peachtree Stable	1 1/8 miles	1:51.40	$100,000	III	
Tropical Park Handicap
1996	Cimarron Secret	5	Jose A. Velez Jr.	James E. Hartley	Francis C. McDonnell	1 1/8 miles	1:52.60	$100,000	III	
1995	Bound by Honor	4	Julie Krone	Carl A. Nafzger	Phillips Racing Partnership	1 1/8 miles	1:51.80	$100,000	III	
1994	Halo's Image	3	Gary Boulanger	Happy Alter	A. I. Appleton & Alter's Racing Stable	1 1/8 miles	1:51.40	$100,000	III	December
1994	Take Me Out	6	Mike E. Smith	William I. Mott	Carl F. Pollard & Warner L. Jones Jr.	1 1/8 miles	1:51.80	$100,000	III	January
1993	Barkerville	5	Randy Romero	Frank L. Brothers	Darley Stud	1 1/8 miles	1:52.40	$75,000	III	
1992	Classic Seven	4	Carlos E. Lopez Sr.	Thomas M. Cairns	John O. Berry	1 1/8 miles	1:53.00	$171,600	III	
1991	Race not held									
1990	Public Account	5	Heberto Castillo Jr.	George Gianos	S. Young Stable	1 1/8 miles	1:52.60	$83,100		
1989	Primal	4	Jose A. Velez Jr.	James E. Bracken	Tartan Stable	1 1/8 miles	1:51.60	$111,600		
1988	Creme Fraiche	6	Walter Guerra	Woodford C. Stephens	Brushwood Stable	1 1/8 miles	1:51.80	$109,900		December
1988	Creme Fraiche	6	Angel Cordero Jr.	Woodford C. Stephens	Brushwood Stable	1 1/4 miles	2:05.80	$219,600		March
Tropical Park Budweiser Breeders' Cup
1987	Arctic Honeymoon	4	Craig Perret	Luis Olivares	Beverly Green	1 3/16 miles	1:59.60	$143,000		
Tropical Park Handicap
1986	Racing Star	4	Earlie Fires	Manuel A. Estevez	Five Star Stable	1 1/8 miles	1:45.20	$50,510		December
1986	Uptown Swell	4	Walter Guerra	Richard J. Lundy	Virginia Kraft Payson	1 1/8 miles	1:53.20	$56,350		January

Legend:
Turf Dirt
Notes:
§ Ran as an entry

== See also ==
List of American and Canadian Graded races
