= W. L. McKnight Stakes =

- Class: Grade 3
- Location: Gulfstream Park (2014–present); Calder Race Course (1973–2013)
- Inaugurated: 1973
- Race type: Thoroughbred – Flat racing
- Website: www.gulfstreampark.com

Race information
- Distance: 1½ miles (12 furlongs)
- Surface: Turf
- Track: Left-handed
- Qualification: Four years & older
- Purse: US$200,000

The W. L. McKnight Stakes is an American Grade 3 Thoroughbred horse race held annually at Gulfstream Park in Hallandale Beach, Florida. Inaugurated in 1973 at Calder Race Course it remained there through 2013 when the track closed. In 2017 a race condition was changed from being open to horses age three and older to those who were four and older. A race on turf at a distance of a mile and one-half, due to safety concerns it was shifted from the turf course to the main dirt track in 1993, 2005, and 2013.

The race was named for William L. McKnight, the founder of Tartan Farms. Prior to 2019, it was run as the W. L. McKnight Handicap.

== Historical notes ==
Twilight Eclipse has the distinction of winning the McKnight Handicap back-to-back on two different racing surfaces. At Calder Race Course, the gelding won the race on grass in 2012 and in 2013 on dirt after it was switched from a soggy grass course to the dirt track. It was only the second time in his career that Twilight Eclipse had run on dirt.

In 1995, Flag Down set the race record that still stood when the Calder track closed. Flag Down was bred by Windfields Farm and raced by Allen Paulson who at the time was also racing the great future U. S. Racing Hall of Fame inductee Cigar.

Of its fifty-three runnings, no female horse has won the McKnight.

== Records ==
Speed record:

- 2:25.90 @ 11/2 miles on Gulfstream Park turf course: Taghleeb (2017)
- 2:24.11 @ 11/2 miles on Calder turf course: Flag Down (1995)

Most wins:

- 2 – Flying Pidgeon (1985, 1986)
- 2 – Twilight Eclipse (2012, 2013)
- 2 – Presious Passion (2007, 2008)

Most wins by a jockey:

- 4 – José Santos (1985, 1986, 1990, 1995)

Most wins by a trainer:

- 5 – Michael J. Maker (2017, 2018, 2019, 2021, 2023)

Most wins by an owner:

- 2 – Buckram Oak Farm (Mahmoud Fustok) (1980, 1982)
- 2 – Constance Daparma & Marjan Stable, Inc. (1985, 1986)
- 2 – Patricia A. Generazio (2007, 2008)
- 2 – West Point Thoroughbreds, Inc. (Terry Finley CEO) (2012, 2013)
- 2 – Ken & Sarah Ramsey (2015, 2018)
- 2 – Michael M. Hui (2017, 2019)

== Winners ==
Year	Winner	Age	Jockey	Trainer	Owner	Dist. (Miles)	Time	Win$	Gr.
2026	Layabout	4	David Egan	Patrick Biancone	Kevin M. Doyle	1 1/2	2:25.27	$200,000	G3
2025	Dashman	4	Florent Geroux	Brian Lynch	Frankly Speaking LLC	1 1/2	2:24.58	$115320	G3
2024	Francesco Clemente (IRE)	4	Irad Ortiz Jr.	Chad Brown	Peter Brant	1 1/2	2:22.64	$116,560	G3
2023	Red Knight	9	Irad Ortiz Jr.	Michael J. Maker	Trinity Farm	11/2	2:25.11	$116,500	G3
2022	Abaan	5	Luis Saez	Todd Pletcher	Eclipse Thoroughbred Partners & Alex Daigneault	11/2	2:29.53	$115,320	G3
2021	Tide Of The Sea	5	Tyler Gaffalione	Michael J. Maker	Three Diamonds Farm	11/2	2:24.57	$87,420	G3
2020	Spooky Channel	5	Julien Leparoux	Brian A. Lynch	Terry Hamilton	11/2	2:26.16	$116,560	G3
2019	Zulu Alpha	6	Irad Ortiz Jr.	Michael J. Maker	Michael M. Hui	11/2	2:36.80	$114,080	G3
2018	Oscar Nominated	5	José Ortiz	Michael J. Maker	Ken & Sarah Ramsey	11/2	2:30.08	$119,040	G3
2017	Taghleeb	6	Tyler Gaffalione	Michael J. Maker	Michael M. Hui	11/2	2:25.90	$115,320	G3
2016	Race not held								
2015	Charming Kitten	5	John R. Velazquez	Todd Pletcher	Ken & Sarah Ramsey	11/2	2:27.76	$59,520	G3
2014	Divine Oath	3	Javier Castellano	Todd Pletcher	Let's Go Stable (Kevin Scatuorchio & Bryan Sullivan)	11/2	2:34.25	$57,040	G3
2013	Twilight Eclipse	4	Jose Lezcano	Thomas Albertrani	West Point Thoroughbreds, Inc. (Terry Finley CEO)	11/2	2:23.66	$75,175	G3
2012	Twilight Eclipse	3	Manoel Cruz	Thomas Albertrani	West Point Thoroughbreds, Inc. (Terry Finley CEO)	11/2	2:26.71	$90,210	G2
2011	Musketier	9	Luis Saez	Roger L. Attfield	Stella Perdomo	11/2	2:28.25	$90,520	G2
2010	Prince Will I Am	3	Javier Castellano	Michelle K. Nihei	Casa Farms I (Susan A. Atkins)	11/2	2:38.40	$93,000	G2
2009	Cloudy's Knight	9	Rosemary Homeister Jr.	Jonathan E. Sheppard	S J Stables LLC (Shirley & Jarrold Schwartz)	11/2	2:27.63	$88,350	G2
2008	Presious Passion	5	Elvis Trujillo	Mary E. Hartmann	Patricia A. Generazio	11/2	2:25.64	$86,490	G2
2007	Presious Passion	4	Elvis Trujillo	Mary E. Hartmann	Patricia A. Generazio	11/2	2:26.13	$115,320	G2
2006	Devil's Preacher	3	Rafael Bejarano	George R. Weaver	R. A. Hill Stable (Randy Hill)	11/2	2:38.28	$120,000	G2
2005	Meteor Storm	6	Javier Castellano	Wallace A. Dollase	The Horizon Stable (M. Jarvis, G. Margolis, K. Smole, J. Conway)	11/2	2:25.91	$120,000	G2
2004	Dreadnaught	4	Jean-Luc Samyn	Thomas H. Voss	Trillium Stable (Douglas Joyce)	11/2	2:26.60	$120,000	G2
2003	Balto Star	5	John R. Velazquez	Todd Pletcher	Anstu Stables, Inc.	11/2	2:24.87	$120,000	G2
2002	Man From Wicklow	5	Jerry D. Bailey	Richard A. Violette Jr.	Richard A. Violette Jr.	11/2	2:28.05	$120,000	G2
2001	Profit Option	6	Mark Guidry	Kenneth E. Hoffman	Mark Conway, K. E. Hoffman, Team Canonie, Inc.	11/2	2:27.95	$90,000	G2
2000	A Little Luck	6	Mike E. Smith	Barclay Tagg	Kathleen Crompton	11/2	2:29.01	$90,000	G2
1999	Wicapi	7	Cornelio Velásquez	Joseph G. Calascibetta	Acclaimed Racing Stable (Michael R. Berry)	11/2	2:26.28	$90,000	G2
1998	Wild Event	5	Shane Sellers	Louis M. Goldfine	Arthur I. Appleton	11/2	2:26.93	$90,000	G2
1997	Panama City	3	Pat Day	Patrick B. Byrne	Robert Sangster & Joseph Lacombe	11/2	2:27.00	$90,000	G2
1996	Diplomatic Jet	4	Jorge F. Chavez	James E. Picou	Fred W. Hooper	11/2	2:24.20	$90,000	G2
1995	Flag Down	5	José Santos	Christophe Clement	Allen E. Paulson	11/2	2:24.00	$90,000	G2
1994-1	Star of Manila	3	Craig Perret	Burk Kessenger Jr.	New Phoenix Stable (Gary Drake)	11/2	2:28.40	$90,000	G2
1994-2	Cobblestone Road	5	José Ferrer	Oliver E. Edwards	Bruce Watkins & Stanley Stahl	11/2	2:27.80	$90,000	G2
1993	Antartic Wings	5	Rene Douglas	Michael Lerman	Sandy Price	11/2	2:32.40	$60,000	G2
1992	Bye Union Avenue	6	Rene Douglas	Reynaldo H. Nobles	Due Process Stable	11/2	2:27.20	$90,000	G2
1991	Stolen Rolls	5	Pedro A. Rodriguez	Lawrence W. Jennings	Esquire Farms	11/2	2:27.00	$60,000	G2
1990	Drum Taps	5	José Santos	Neil J. Howard	William S. Farish III	11/2	2:29.80	$60,000	G2
1989	Mataji	4	Douglas Valiente	Happy Alter	Alters Racing Stable	11/2	2:25.60	$90,000	G2
1988	All Sincerity	4	Constantino Hernandez	Angel M. Medina	Almost Heaven Stable, Inc.	11/2	2:25.40	$120,000	G2
1987	Creme Fraiche	6	Eddie Maple	Woody Stephens	Brushwood Stable (Elizabeth Moran)	11/2	2:27.00	$120,000	G2
1986	Flying Pidgeon	5	José Santos	Luis Olivares	Constance Daparma & Marjan Stable, Inc.	11/2	2:39.60	$120,000	G2
1985-1	Jack Slade	4	Gerland Galitano	David C. Kassen	Andrew Adams	11/2	2:26.20	$69,900	G2
1985-2	Flying Pidgeon	5	José Santos	Luis Olivares	Constance Daparma & Marjan Stable, Inc.	11/2	2:25.80	$70,800	G2
1984-1	Open Call	6	Jorge Velásquez	Robert J. Reinacher Jr.	Greentree Stable	11/2	2:30.20	$63,755	G2
1984-2	Nijinsky's Secret	5	José Vélez Jr.	Kent H. Stirling	Hedley McDougald	11/2	2:31.20	$63,675	G2
1983	Current Blade	6	Jerry D. Bailey	John P. Campo	Buckland Farm	11/2 ±	2:29.20	$70,020	G2
1982-1	Ghazwan	6	Constantino Hernandez	Leonard Imperio	Buckram Oak Farm (Mahmoud Fustok)	11/2	2:28.80	$61,920	G2
1982-2	Russian George	5	Miguel A. Rivera	Jean Cruguet	Sea Salt Farm, Inc.	11/2	2:29.80	$61,320	G2
1981-1	El Barril	5	Jacinto Vásquez	Angel A. Penna Jr.	Walnut Hill Farm	11/2	2:28.40	$51,630	G3
1981-2	Buckpoint	5	Jerry D. Bailey	J. Bert Sonnier	Owen Helman	11/2	2:28.00	$52,230	G3
1980-1	Old Crony	5	Don Brumfield	Edward I. Kelly Sr.	Bwamazon Farm (Millard A. Waldheim)	11/8 ±	1:48.40	$35,565	G3
1980-2	Drum's Captain	5	Jeffrey Fell	Leonard Imperio	Buckram Oak Farm (Mahmoud Fustok)	11/8 ±	1:48.00	$34,875	G3
1979	Bob's Dusty	5	Richard DePass	William E. Adams	Robert N. Lehmann	11/8 ±	1:48.00	$55,800	G3
1978	Practitioner	5	Jesus S. Rodriguez	Leo Sierra	Dogwood Stable	11/8 ±	1:48.00	$56,520	G3
1977	Hall of Reason	5	Mickey Solomone	Dukas "Duke" Davis	Malcolm Woldenberg	11/8 ±	1:47.20	$52,200	G3
1976	Toonerville	3	Gene St. Leon	Norman St. Leon	Frank & Mike Ryan & Norman St. Leon	11/8 ±	1:44.60	$55,800	G3
1975	Snurb	5	Gene St. Leon	Reed M. Combest	B.L.T. Stable (Art Bruns, et al.)	11/8 ±	1:46.00	$37,800	LR
1974	Shane's Prince	5	Eddie Maple	Frank J. McManus	Red Hand Stable	11/8 ±	1:46.00	$35,700	
1973	Getajetholme	4	Joseph E. Imparato	J. Bert Sonnier	Ralph Sessa	11/8 ±	1:47.20	$38,700	
