= Gardenia Stakes =

Gardenia Stakes may refer to the following American Thoroughbred horse races:

- Gardenia Stakes (Garden State Park)
- Brave Raj Stakes or Gardenia Stakes at Calder Race Course
- Groupie Doll Stakes or Ellis Park Gardenia Stakes
