= Princess Rooney Stakes =

- Class: Grade III
- Location: Gulfstream Park; Hallandale Beach, Florida, United States
- Inaugurated: 1985 (at Calder Race Course as Princess Rooney Handicap )
- Race type: Thoroughbred - Flat racing
- Website: Gulfstream Park

Race information
- Distance: 7 furlongs
- Surface: Dirt
- Track: left-handed
- Qualification: Fillies & Mares, three-years-old and older
- Weight: Base weights with allowances: Older: 126 lbs 3YOs: 122 lbs
- Purse: $220,000 (2024)
- Bonuses: Winner receives automatic entry to the Breeders' Cup Filly & Mare Sprint

The Princess Rooney Stakes is a Grade III American Thoroughbred horse race for fillies and mares aged three and older over a distance of seven furlongs on the dirt run annually at Gulfstream Park in Hallandale Beach, Florida.

== History ==
The inaugural running of the event was on 10 August 1985 at Calder Race Course as the Princess Rooney Handicap.

The event is named in honor for the U.S. Hall of Fame filly Princess Rooney, who won her first four starts at the Calder racetrack.

The event was contested at a distance of seven furlongs until 1997. The event was run at six furlongs from 1998 to 2015.

In 1999, the event was upgraded to Grade III status by the Thoroughbred Owners and Breeders Association and carried a $300,000 purse. Three years later the event was upgraded again to Grade II. The event was a Grade I event from 2006 to 2014. The race was not run in 2014 due to changes in the racing schedule resulting from Gulfstream announcing their lease of the Calder Race Course property.

In 2015, the race was run at Gulfstream for the first time as the Princess Rooney Stakes, as the conditions were changed from handicap to allowance weights. The race had also been downgraded to Grade II status. The following year, the distance was increased back to the original 7 furlongs.

In 2020 due to the COVID-19 pandemic in the United States, Gulfstream Park did not schedule the event in their updated and shortened spring-summer meeting. The following year, the race became an invitational event.

In April 2023 Gulfstream announced that the Princess Rooney, usually run in early July, would be moved to a new date at the beginning of October. As a consequence of the change, the American Graded Stakes Committee downgraded the race to Grade III status.

The race is part of the Breeders' Cup Challenge "Win and You're In" series, with the winner receiving automatic entry to the Breeders' Cup Filly & Mare Sprint.

== Records ==
Speed record:

- 7 furlongs: 1:21.68 - Curlin's Approval (2017)
- 6 furlongs: 1:09.29 - Merry Meadow (2015)

Margins:

- 6 3/4 lengths - Game Face (2009)

Most wins:

- 2 - Classy Tricks (1986, 1987)
- 2 - Magal (1991, 1992)
- 2 - Gold Mover (2002, 2003)
- 2 - Stormy Embrace (2018, 2019)
- 2 - Ce Ce (2021, 2022)

Most wins by a jockey:

- 3 - Jerry Bailey (2002, 2003, 2005)

Most wins by a trainer:

- 5 - Martin D. Wolfson (1995, 1996, 2010, 2013, 2017)

Most wins by an owner:

- 2 - Harry Katz (1986, 1987)
- 2 - Dolares S. Tamargo (1991, 1992)
- 2 - Edward P. Evans (2002, 2003)
- 2 - Matalona Thoroughbreds (2018, 2019)
- 2 - Bo Hirsch (2021, 2022)
- 2 - C2 Racing Stable (2024, 2025)

== Winners ==
Year	Winner	Age	Jockey	Trainer	Owner	Distance	Time	Purse	Grade	Ref
At Gulfstream Park – Princess Rooney Stakes
2026	Kerry's Kiss	4	Edwin Gonzalez	Saffie Joseph Jr.	Epic Horses, BAG Racing Stables and The White House Stables	7 furlongs	1:25.33	$225,000	III	
2025	Haulin Ice	4	Edgard Zayas	Saffie Joseph Jr.	C2 Racing Stable, Paul Braverman, Miller Racing & Timothy Pinch	7 furlongs	1:22.80	$200,000	III	
2024	Soul of an Angel	5	Drayden Van Dyke	Saffie Joseph Jr.	C2 Racing Stable & Agave Racing Stable	7 furlongs	1:23.23	$210,000	III	
2023	Three Witches	4	Leonel Reyes	Saffie Joseph Jr.	e Five Racing Thoroughbreds	7 furlongs	1:22.89	$200,000	III	
2022	Ce Ce	6	Victor Espinoza	Michael W. McCarthy	Bo Hirsch	7 furlongs	1:22.20	$300,000	II	
2021	Ce Ce	5	Victor Espinoza	Michael W. McCarthy	Bo Hirsch	7 furlongs	1:21.94	$350,000	II	
2020	Race not held									
2019	Stormy Embrace	5	Wilmer A. Garcia	Kathleen O'Connell	Matalona Thoroughbreds	7 furlongs	1:22.99	$250,000	II	
2018	Stormy Embrace	4	Wilmer A. Garcia	Kathleen O'Connell	Matalona Thoroughbreds	7 furlongs	1:21.81	$250,000	II	
2017	Curlin's Approval	4	Luis Saez	Martin D. Wolfson	Alter's Racing Stable & Bridlewood Farm	7 furlongs	1:21.68	$250,000	II	
2016	Spelling Again	5	Luis Saez	Brad H. Cox	Seajay Racing	7 furlongs	1:22.09	$250,000	II	
2015	Merry Meadow	5	Javier Castellano	Mark A. Hennig	William Parsons Jr. & David S. Howe	6 furlongs	1:09.29	$250,000	II	
2014	Race not held									
At Calder Racetrack – Princess Rooney Handicap
2013	Starship Truffles	4	Edgard J. Zayas	Martin D. Wolfson	Chasing Tails Stables	6 furlongs	1:10.57	$350,000	I	
2012	Musical Romance	5	Juan Leyva	William A. Kaplan	William A. Kaplan & Pinnacle Racing Stable (Adam Lazarus, managing partner)	6 furlongs	1:10.92	$400,000	I	
2011	Sassy Image	4	Mike E. Smith	Dale L. Romans	Jerry Romans	6 furlongs	1:11.61	$350,000	I	
2010	Jessica Is Back	6	Elvis Trujillo	Martin D. Wolfson	Farnsworth Stables	6 furlongs	1:11.48	$350,000	I	
2009	Game Face	4	Edgar S. Prado	Todd A. Pletcher	Zabeel Racing International	6 furlongs	1:10.74	$350,000	I	
2008	Mistical Plan	4	Corey Nakatani	Doug F. O'Neill	J. Paul Reddam	6 furlongs	1:10.76	$400,000	I	
2007	River's Prayer	4	Clinton L. Potts	Paula S. Capestro	Paula S. Capestro, Bantry Farms & Martin Racing Stable	6 furlongs	1:10.66	$500,000	I	
2006	Malibu Mint	4	Josue Arce	James R. Chapman	John & Martha Mulholland	6 furlongs	1:10.02	$500,000	I	
2005	Madcap Escapade	4	Jerry D. Bailey	Frank L. Brothers	Bruce Lunsford	6 furlongs	1:09.93	$500,000	II	
2004	Ema Bovary (CHI)	5	Roberto M. Gonzalez	Larry D. Ross	Richard T. Beal Jr. & Lana Ramsey-Borg	6 furlongs	1:10.81	$500,000	II	
2003	Gold Mover	5	Jerry D. Bailey	Mark A. Hennig	Edward P. Evans	6 furlongs	1:11.31	$500,000	II	
2002	Gold Mover	4	Jerry D. Bailey	Mark A. Hennig	Edward P. Evans	6 furlongs	1:10.21	$400,000	II	
2001	Dream Supreme	4	Pat Day	William I. Mott	Kinsman Stable	6 furlongs	1:10.48	$400,000	III	
2000	Hurricane Bertie	5	Pat Day	Bernard S. Flint	Richard, Bertram & Elaine Klein	6 furlongs	1:11.43	$400,000	III	
1999	Princess Pietrina	5	Rosemary Homeister Jr.	Frank Carlisi	Gemini Stables	6 furlongs	1:10.49	$300,000	III	
1998	U Can Do It	5	Eibar Coa	Larry Pilotti	Carina & Frank Marano	6 furlongs	1:10.12	$250,000	Listed	
1997	Vivace	4	Randy Romero	Cam Gambolati	Post Oak Farm	6 furlongs	1:10.94	$250,000	Listed	
1996	Chaposa Springs	4	Laffit Pincay Jr.	Martin D. Wolfson	Suresh Chintamaneni	7 furlongs	1:23.40	$100,000	Listed	
1995	Miss Gibson County	4	Gary Boulanger	Martin D. Wolfson	Michael E. Pegram	7 furlongs	1:23.18	$100,000	Listed	
1994	Roamin Rachel	4	Wigberto S. Ramos	Claude R. McGaughey III	Tri Honors Stable	7 furlongs	1:24.01	$100,000	Listed	
1993	Lady Sonata	4	Michael Andre Lee	Oliver E. Edwards	V E J Stables	7 furlongs	1:23.00	$50,000	Listed	
1992	Magal	5	Ruben Hernandez	Raymond Tamargo	Dolares S. Tamargo	7 furlongs	1:23.60	$50,000	Listed	
1991	Magal	4	Ruben Hernandez	Raymond Tamargo	Dolares S. Tamargo	7 furlongs	1:24.62	$54,250	Listed	
1990	Sweet Proud Polly	3	Pedro A. Rodriguez	Ronald J. Sarazin	Mrs. Eric H. Cocks	7 furlongs	1:25.00	$53,400		
1989	Ana T.	4	Robert Neal Lester	George Julian	Holly Rincon	7 furlongs	1:24.80	$81,650		
1988	Spirit of Fighter	5	Odin J. Londono	Daniel C. Hurtak	Dennis Punches & Dan Hurtak	7 furlongs	1:24.60	$54,250		
1987	Classy Tricks	4	Marland C. Suckie	Ron A. Felix	Harry Katz & Sidney L. Port	7 furlongs	1:25.00	$53,400		
1986	Classy Tricks	3	Robert Neal Lester	Ron A. Felix	Harry Katz	7 furlongs	1:25.00	$45,550		
1985	Birdie Belle	4	J. A. Santiago	Leo Sierra	Cuardra Santa Rita	7 furlongs	1:24.40	$55,400		

== See also ==
- List of American and Canadian Graded races
