= Heberto Castillo Jr. =

Panamanian jockey (born 1969)

Personal information
- Born: July 21, 1969 (age 57) Panama City, Panama
- Occupation: Jockey

Horse racing career
- Sport: Horse racing
- Career wins: 2,113 (ongoing)

Major racing wins
- Desert Vixen Stakes (1987); Miami Mile Handicap (1989); Carry Back Stakes (1990, 1994); Fred W. Hooper Handicap (1990); Memorial Day Handicap (1990); Pan American Stakes (1990); Bahamas Stakes (1991, 1992); Frank Gomez Memorial Stakes (1991); Everglades Stakes (1992); Donn Handicap (1993, 1994); Pennsylvania Governor's Cup Handicap (1993); Affectionately Handicap (1996, 2000); Black Helen Handicap (1998); Hialeah Turf Cup Handicap (1988); Distaff Handicap (1999); First Flight Handicap (1999, 2003); Matron Stakes (1999); Red Bank Stakes (1999); Ladies Handicap (1999, 2000); Metropolitan Handicap (2000); Excelsior Handicap (2000); Glens Falls Handicap (2000); Maryland Million Distaff Handicap (2000); Withers Stakes (2000); Hollie Hughes Handicap (2002); Top Flight Handicap (2003); Safely Kept Stakes (2003); Fred "Cappy" Capossela Stakes (2004); Endeavour Stakes (2005)

Racing awards
- Leading rider Calder Race Course (1990)

Significant horses
- Pistols and Roses, Yagli

Heberto Castillo Jr. (born July 21, 1969 in Panama City, Panama) is a retired jockey in American Thoroughbred horse racing. He was born into a family involved in the sport. His father was a jockey and his mother Gloria was a horse trainer in Florida. His sister, Rita, married jockey José Santos in 1997.

In 1986, Castillo rode in his first race at Fair Grounds Race Course in New Orleans, Louisiana and four years later won the riding title at Florida's Calder Race Course. Among his major career wins were two Donn Handicaps in 1993 and 1994, the 1998 Hialeah Turf Cup Handicap, and the 2000 Metropolitan Handicap.

Castillo retired in 2006.

== Year-end charts ==
Chart (2000–2001)	Peak position
National Earnings List for Jockeys 2000	49
National Earnings List for Jockeys 2001	96
