= Manoel Cruz =

American jockey

Manny Cruz
Personal information
- Born: May 20, 1970 (age 56) Minas Gerais, Brazil
- Occupation: Jockey

Horse racing career
- Sport: Horse racing
- Career wins: 2824 (thru 7/01/2018)

Major racing wins
- Louisville Handicap (2000); Hillsborough Stakes (2002); My Dear Girl Stakes (2002, 2006, 2007); Susan's Girl Stakes (2002, 2005, 2006); Appleton Handicap (2003); Endeavour Stakes (2003); Frances A. Genter Stakes (2004); Rampart Handicap (2005); Affirmed Stakes (2005, 2006); Brave Raj Stakes (2005); Desert Vixen Stakes (2005, 2009); Dr. Fager Stakes (2005, 2006); Miami Mile Stakes (2005, 2008, 2010); Deputy Minister Handicap (2006); Pasco Stakes (2006); Shirley Jones Handicap (2006); What a Pleasure Stakes (2006, 2007); Sunshine Millions Dash (2007); Ohio Derby (2008); Hutcheson Stakes (2008); Spend A Buck Handicap (2009); Stage Door Betty Handicap (2009); Memorial Day Handicap (2010, 2013, 2014); Sunshine Millions Distaff (2010); Dogwood Stakes (2011); Mint Julep Handicap (2011, 2012); Regret Stakes (2011); W. L. McKnight Handicap (2012); Calder Derby (2014)

Manoel R. Cruz (born May 20, 1970) is a Brazilian jockey in American Thoroughbred horse racing.

He has won multiple graded stakes races, including four grade II level races.

For every year since 2003, he has finished in the top 15 jockeys at Gulfstream Park.

Manny Cruz has over 2,800 career wins.

Manny Cruz resides in Miami, Florida.
