= Deputy Minister Handicap =

- Class: Grade III
- Location: Gulfstream Park; Hallandale Beach, Florida, United States
- Inaugurated: 1990
- Race type: Thoroughbred – Flat racing
- Website: www.gulfstreampark.com

Race information
- Distance: 6.5 furlong sprint
- Surface: Dirt
- Track: left-handed
- Qualification: Four-years-old & up
- Weight: Assigned
- Purse: $100,000

The Deputy Minister Handicap was a Grade III American Thoroughbred horse race run annually in early February at Gulfstream Park in Hallandale Beach, Florida. The race was open to horses age four and older and contested on dirt over a distance of six and one-half furlongs.

The race was named in honor of Deputy Minister who raced in Florida and won Gulfstream Park's Donn Handicap. Deputy Minister was the 1981 American Champion Two-Year-Old Colt and the Canadian Two-Year Old Champion and Canadian Horse of the Year and was the Leading sire in North America in 1997 and 1998 and the Leading broodmare sire in North America in 2007.

Since inception, the event has been contested at different distances:

- 6 furlongs: 1994–1998
- 6.5 furlongs : 2000 to present
- 7 furlongs : 1990–1993, 1998–1999

The race is not on the 2008 list of stakes races at Gulfstream Park.

== Records ==
Speed record: (at current distance of 6.5 furlongs)

- 1:15.17 – Native Heir (2003)

== Winners since 2000 ==
Year	Winner	Age	Jockey	Trainer	Owner	Time
2007	Keyed Entry	4	John Velazquez	Anthony J. Sciametta Jr.	Starlight Stable et al.	1:15:72
2006	Universal Form	5	Manoel Cruz	Elliston Rolle	Universal Xperience	1:16.48
2005	Medallist	4	José A. Santos	H. Allen Jerkens	Robert Clay	1:15.62
2004	Alke	4	John Velazquez	Todd A. Pletcher	K. D. English/A. Braun	1:15.80
2003	Native Heir	5	Cornelio Velásquez	Mark Shuman	Michael Gill	1:15.17
2002	Fappies Notebook	5	Jorge Chavez	Manny Tortora	Irving & Marjorie Cowan	1:16.19
2001	Istintaj	5	Jerry Bailey	Mark Hennig	Shadwell Racing	1:16.08
2000	Deep Gold	4	John Velazquez	Bernie Flint	N. Chowhan & J. L. Millan	1:15.89

== Earlier winners ==
- 1999 – Good And Tough
- 1998 – Irish Conquest
- 1997 – Templado
- 1996 – Jess C's Whirl
- 1995 – Chimes Band
- 1994 – I Can't Believe
- 1993 – Loach
- 1992 – Take Me Out
- 1991 – Unbridled
- 1990 – Beau Genius
