= Calder Derby =

Calder Derby discontinued
- Class: Grade III
- Location: Calder Race Course; Miami Gardens, Florida, United States
- Inaugurated: 1972 (as the Hollywood Handicap)
- Final run: 2014
- Race type: Thoroughbred – Flat racing
- Website: www.calderracecourse.com

Race information
- Distance: 1 1/16 Mile (1972–1978; 1982–1992; 2012); 1 1/8 Mile (1979–1981; 1994–2010; 2013–14); 1 Mile + 70 yards (1993)
- Surface: Dirt (1972–1976; 1980–1997; 2012–2014); Turf (1977–78; 1998–2010)
- Track: Left-handed
- Qualification: 3-year-olds (1985–2014); 3-year-olds and older (1972–1985)
- Weight: Scale Weight
- Purse: $250,000

The Calder Derby (inaugurated as the Hollywood Handicap) was an American Grade III Thoroughbred horse race held at Calder Race Course in Miami, Florida from 1972 to 2014.

== History ==
Inaugurated as the Hollywood Handicap in 1972, the race was open for horses age three and up until 1985 when it was restricted to just three-year-olds. The race would run on the dirt (except for in 1977 and 1978) until becoming a turf race in 1998.

In 1994, the name was changed to the Calder Derby, save for in 1996, when it was known as the Calder Breeders’ Cup Derby. In addition, the race was moved from the summer to October.

In 2011, the race was cancelled, likely due to scheduling disputes with neighboring rival track Gulfstream Park, leading to a reduced 2011 stakes schedule for Calder.

In 2012, the race returned and was moved to April and was again made a dirt race.

In 2014, Our Caravan won the final running of the race. Two months later, the track was sold to The Stronach Group and rebranded to Gulfstream Park West. This eventually led to the race being quietly discontinued the following year.

== Records ==
Time record: (at 1 1/8 miles distance)

- 1:47.70 – Crowd Pleaser (1998)

Most wins:

- 2 – Opening Lead (1983, 1984)

Most wins by a jockey:

- 2 – Gary Boulanger (1994, 1997)
- 2 – Eibar Coa (2002, 2004)

Most wins by a trainer:

- 2 – Manuel Azpurua (1983, 1984)
- 2 – Elbert Ray Dixon (1990, 1991)

Most wins by an owner:

- 2 – Brad D. Gay (1983, 1984)

== Winners ==
Year	Winner	Jockey	Trainer	Owner	Distance (Surface)	Time	Purse
2014	Our Caravan	Manoel R. Cruz	Michael Dilger	Anstu Stables	1 1/8 Miles (Dirt)	1:54.32	$258,720
2013	Sr Quisqueyano	Carlos Olivero	Luis Olivares	DDRD Racing	1 1/8 Miles (Dirt)	1:52.71	$250,000
2012	Good Morning Diva	Fernando Jara	David Braddy	George J. Kerr	1 1/16 Miles (Dirt)	1:46.96	$150,000
2010	Tannersville	Wilmer Galviz	Henry Collazo	Four Horsemen Racing Stable (John Kasbar)	1 1/8 Miles (Turf)	1:49.32	$75,000
2009	Sal the Barber	Eddie Castro	Christophe Clement	Lewis Schaffel	1 1/8 Miles (Turf)	1:49.41	$100,000
2008	Sporting Art	Javier Castellano	Christophe Clement	John & Sarah Kelly	1 1/8 Miles (Turf)	1:47.93	$400,000
2007	Soldier's Dancer	Cornelio Velásquez	David A. Vivian	Herman Heinlein	1 1/8 Miles (Turf)	1:52.21	$200,000
2006	Can't Beat It	René Douglas	Martin D. Wolfson	Live Oak Plantation	1 1/8 Miles (Turf)	1:48.79	$200,000
2005	Dazzling Dr Cevin	Julio Garcia	Luis Olivares	Rey Wan Racing	1 1/8 Miles (Dirt)^{4}	1:52.44	$200,000
2004	Eddington	Eibar Coa	Mark Hennig	Willmott Stables	1 1/8 Miles (Turf)	1:51.25	$200,000
2003	Stroll	Jerry D. Bailey	William I. Mott	Claiborne Farm	1 1/8 Miles (Turf)	1:48.39	$200,000
2002	Union Place	Eibar Coa	Randy Schulhofer	William Sorokolit	1 1/8 Miles (Turf)	1:47.76	$200,000
2001	Western Pride	Dana Whitley	Richard Estvanko	Theresa McCarthur/C. Chapman	1 1/8 Miles (Dirt)	1:51.12	$200,000
2000	Whata Brainstorm	Rosemary Homeister Jr.	James E. Picou	John Eaton	1 1/8 Miles (Turf)	1:47.80	$200,000
1999	Isaypete	José Ferrer	James K. Chapman	Theresa McArthur	1 1/8 Miles (Turf)	1:50.01	$200,000
1998	Crowd Pleaser	Jean-Luc Samyn	Jonathan Sheppard	Augustin Stable	1 1/8 Miles (Turf)	1:47.70	$200,000
1997	Blazing Sword	Gary Boulanger	Kathleen O'Connell	Gilbert G. Campbell	1 1/8 Miles (Dirt)	1:53.00	$150,000
1996	Laughing Dan	Pedro A. Rodriguez	Luis Olivares	Cobble View Stable (Gardner F. Landon)	1 1/8 Miles (Dirt)	1:50.60	$100,000
1995	Pineing Patty	Larrry Melancon	Lynn S. Whiting	W. Cal Partee	1 1/8 Miles (Dirt)	1:51.40	$100,000
1994	Halo’s Image	Gary Boulanger	Happy E. Alter	Arthur I. Appleton & Alter's Racing Stable, Inc.	1 1/8 Miles (Dirt)	1:52.20	$150,000
1993	Medieval Mac	Mary Russ	George Gianos	N/A	1 Mile + 70 Yards (Dirt)	N/A	$50,000
1992	Birdonthewire	Michael Todd Hunter	Carl Bowling	N/A	1 1/16 Miles (Dirt)	N/A	$50,000
1991	Scottish Ice	Robert Neal Lester	Elbert R. Dixon	N/A	1 1/16 Miles (Dirt)	N/A	$50,000
1990	Zalipour	Derek Anthony Acevedo	Elbert R. Dixon	Elbert R. Dixon	1 1/16 Miles (Dirt)	N/A	$50,000
1989	Silver Sunsets^{3}	Miguel Angel Gonzalez	Luis Olivares	Three G Stable	1 1/16 Miles (Dirt)	N/A	$50,000
1988	Frosty The Snowman	Douglas Valiente	Happy Alter	Arthur I. Appleton	1 1/16 Miles (Dirt)	N/A	$40,000
1987	Schism	Robert Neal Lester	James E. Bracken	Tartan Stable	1 1/16 Miles (Dirt)	N/A	$50,000
1986	Annapolis John	Jose A. Velez, Jr.	Juan A. Sanchez	Brazil Stable	1 1/16 Miles (Dirt)	N/A	$40,000
1985	Gray Haze	Frank Anthony Pennisi	Jerry P. Paradise	Old Mill Road Farms	1 1/16 Miles (Dirt)	N/A	$50,000
1984	Opening Lead	Jose A. Santos	Manuel J. Azpurua	Brad D. Gay	1 1/16 Miles (Dirt)	N/A	$50,000
1983	Opening Lead	B. Gonzalez	Manuel J. Azpurua	Brad D. Gay	1 1/16 Miles (Dirt)	N/A	$30,000
1982	Glorious Past	Alfredo Smith, Jr.	James E. Bracken	Fred G. Warren	1 1/16 Miles (Dirt)	N/A	$30,000
1981	Poking	G. Cohen	Mario Martinez, Jr.	Gonzalez & Mar-Deb-Ron Farm	1 1/8 Miles (Dirt)	N/A	$35,000
1980	Rodney G	Verardi F	Frank San Pedro	Frank San Pedro	1 1/8 Miles (Dirt)	N/A	$35,000
1979	Breezy Fire	Miguel A. Rivera	Frank Gomez	Mario T. Zacco	1 1/8 Miles (Dirt)	N/A	$25,000
1978	Ole Wilk	Issac J. Jimenez	Newcomb Green	Green R I	1 1/16 Miles (Turf)	N/A	$25,000
1977	What A Threat	Robert Gaffalione	William Stirling	Stirrup Hill Farm	1 1/16 Miles (Turf)	N/A	$25,000
1976	Chilean Chief	Joseph Imparato	Merritt A. Buxton	Sunrise Farm	1 1/16 Miles (Dirt)	N/A	$25,000
1975^{2}	Rimsky (DH)	Arnulfo Haldar	Guillermo Sarmiento	Batthyany Countess Margit	1 1/16 Miles (Dirt)	N/A	N/A
1975^{2}	Strand Of Gold (DH)	Roy Cave	Herman C. Miller	S. Richards	1 1/16 Miles (Dirt)	N/A	N/A
1974	Amberbee^{1}	N/A	N/A	N/A	1 1/16 Miles (Dirt)	N/A	N/A
1973	Willmar	Laffit A. Pincay, Jr.	Richard W. Mulhall	R. Benford	1 1/16 Miles (Dirt)	N/A	N/A
1972	First Bloom	N/A	N/A	N/A	1 1/16 Miles (Dirt)	N/A	N/A

=== Notes: ===
^{1}In 1974, Snurb crossed the line first, however was disqualified and set back to seventh place.
^{2}In 1975, Rimsky and Strand of Gold finished in a dead heat for the win.
^{3}In 1989, Big Stanley crossed the line first, however was disqualified and set back to sixth place.
^{4}In 2005, the race was moved to the dirt due to heavy overnight rain.
