= Azalea Stakes =

- Class: Listed
- Location: Gulfstream Park; Hallandale Beach, Florida, United States; Moved in 2015 from Calder Race Course to Gulfstream
- Inaugurated: 1975
- Race type: Thoroughbred – Flat racing
- Website: www.gulfstreampark.com

Race information
- Distance: 7 furlongs
- Surface: Dirt
- Track: left-handed
- Qualification: Three-year-old fillies
- Weight: Assigned
- Purse: $100,000 (2016)

The Azalea Stakes is a race for Thoroughbred horses once run at Calder Race Course in Miami Gardens, Florida, on the Summit of Speed Day each year. Since 2015, the Azalea is now run at Gulfstream Park due to racing negotiations between the two Florida racetracks. Inaugurated in 1975 as the Azalea Handicap, the race is open to three-year-old fillies willing to race seven furlongs on the dirt. The listed race carries a purse of $100,000.

The race has been run at a variety of distances:

- 6 furlongs – 1976–1977, 1980, 1997–2013
- 6.5 furlongs – 1991
- 7 furlongs – 1978–1979, 1981–1990, 1992–1996, 2015–present

== Winners since 1995 ==
- 2016 – Dearest (Emisael Jaramillo)
- 2015 – Dogwood Trail (Jesus M. Rios)
- 2014 – NOT RUN
- 2013 – Wildcat Lily (Jose L. Alvarez)
- 2012 – Another Romance (Luca Panici)
- 2011 – Devilish Lady (Daniel Centeno)
- 2010 – Pica Slew
- 2009 – First Passage (Jermaine Bridgmohan)
- 2008 – Indyanne (Russell Baze)
- 2007 – Sheets (Robby Albarado)
- 2006 – Victorina
- 2005 – Leave Me Alone
- 2004 – Dazzle Me
- 2003 – Ebony Breeze
- 2002 – Bold World
- 2001 – Hattiesburg (Mark Guidry)
- 2000 – Swept Away
- 1999 – Show Me The Stage
- 1998 – Cassidly
- 1997 – Little Sister
- 1996 – J J's Dream
- 1995 – Lucky Lavender Gal
