= Creme Fraiche (horse) =

Horse

- Sire: Rich Cream
- Grandsire: Creme Dela Creme
- Dam: Likely Exchange
- Damsire: Terrible Tiger
- Sex: Gelding
- Foaled: April 7, 1982
- Country: United States
- Colour: Bay
- Breeder: Pamela H. Firman and G. Watts Humphrey
- Owner: Brushwood Stable
- Trainer: Woody Stephens
- Record: 64: 17-12-13
- Earnings: $4,024,727

Major wins
- Derby Trial (1985); American Derby (1985); Super Derby (1985); Jerome Breeders' Cup Handicap (1985); Jockey Club Gold Cup (1986, 1987); Donn Handicap (1986); Meadowlands Handicap (1987); W. L. McKnight Handicap (1987); Tropical Park Handicap (Jan & Dec 1988) Triple Crown race wins: Belmont Stakes (1985)

Honours
- Creme Fraiche Handicap at Gulfstream Park
- Last updated on September 16, 2007

Creme Fraiche (April 7, 1982 – October 9, 2003) was an American Thoroughbred racehorse.

== Background ==
Creme Fraiche was sired by Rich Cream, co-holder of the world record of 1:19.40 for 7 furlongs on dirt in the 1980 Triple Bend Handicap. His dam Likely Exchange was a female-line descendant of Strange Device, a half-sister to the Kentucky Oaks winner Mars Shield.

Bred by Pamela Firman and her nephew, G. Watts Humphrey, Jr., Creme Fraiche was originally sent as a yearling colt to the 1983 Fasig-Tipton Kentucky July sale, where he was sold to Brushwood Stable for $160,000. He was sent from there to Virginia's Hickory Tree Stable for breaking where he proved unruly and was gelded.

== Racing career ==
Although thought to be a "late bloomer", Creme Fraiche was a hardy three-year-old, winning the Derby Trial and the Belmont Stakes, with Eddie Maple astride, becoming the first gelding to win the classic race and the fourth consecutive Belmont winner for his trainer, Woody Stephens. By the end of his three-year-old season, he had five graded stakes wins.

As a four-year-old, Creme Fraiche won the Jockey Club Gold Cup, defeating Turkoman, and ended the year with almost $1 million in additional earnings.

At five, he again won the Jockey Club Gold Cup (beating Java Gold) as well as the Meadowlands Handicap, and finished that year with a career high of $1,323,666 in earnings.

At six, he won both the January and December Tropical Park Handicap but never won another graded race again, with a third at age six in the W. L. McKnight Handicap as his best effort.

== Retirement ==
Retired at age seven, Creme Fraiche was sent to Brushwood Stable near Malvern, PA, for pensioning. He was visited by fans bringing his favorite treat of mints until he was put down due to a severe case of laminitis on October 9, 2003, at the age of 21. He was buried at the farm in the memorial garden at Bryn Clovis.

== Pedigree ==
Pedigree of Creme Fraiche (USA), bay gelding, 1982
Sire Rich Cream (USA) 1975	Creme Dela Creme (USA); 1963	Olympia	Heliopolis* (GB)
Sire Rich Cream (USA) 1975	Creme Dela Creme (USA); 1963	Olympia	Miss Dolphin
Sire Rich Cream (USA) 1975	Creme Dela Creme (USA); 1963	Judy Rullah	Nasrullah*
Sire Rich Cream (USA) 1975	Creme Dela Creme (USA); 1963	Judy Rullah	Judy-Rae
Sire Rich Cream (USA) 1975	Right Turn (USA); 1961	Turn-To (IRE)	Royal Charger* (GB)
Sire Rich Cream (USA) 1975	Right Turn (USA); 1961	Turn-To (IRE)	Source Sucree (FR)
Sire Rich Cream (USA) 1975	Right Turn (USA); 1961	Plum Plum	On-and-On*
Sire Rich Cream (USA) 1975	Right Turn (USA); 1961	Plum Plum	Plum Cake
Dam Likely Exchange (USA) 1974	Terrible Tiger (USA); 1965	Amerigo (GB)	Nearco* (ITY)
Dam Likely Exchange (USA) 1974	Terrible Tiger (USA); 1965	Amerigo (GB)	Sanlinea
Dam Likely Exchange (USA) 1974	Terrible Tiger (USA); 1965	Proprietress	Your Host
Dam Likely Exchange (USA) 1974	Terrible Tiger (USA); 1965	Proprietress	Omelet Souffle
Dam Likely Exchange (USA) 1974	Likely Swap (USA); 1962	Swaps	Khaled (GB)
Dam Likely Exchange (USA) 1974	Likely Swap (USA); 1962	Swaps	Iron Reward
Dam Likely Exchange (USA) 1974	Likely Swap (USA); 1962	Most Likely	Heliopolis* (GB)
Dam Likely Exchange (USA) 1974	Likely Swap (USA); 1962	Most Likely	Strange Device (Family: 9-f)

* Creme Fraiche is inbred 4S x 4D to the stallion Heliopolis, meaning that he appears fourth generation on the sire side of his pedigree, and fourth generation on the dam side of his pedigree.

* Creme Fraiche is inbred 5S x 5S x 6S x 4D to the stallion Nearco, meaning that he appears fifth generation twice (via Nasrullah and Royal Charger) and sixth generation once (via On-and-On) on the sire side of his pedigree, and fourth generation once on the dam side of his pedigree.

* Creme Fraiche is inbred 4S x 5S to the stallion Nasrullah, meaning that he appears fourth generation and fifth generation (via On-and-On) on the sire side of his pedigree.
