= Brave Raj Stakes =

The Brave Raj Stakes is an American Thoroughbred horse race run annually in late September at Calder Race Course in Miami Gardens, Florida. Open to two-year-old fillies, it is raced over a distance of one mile and seventy yards. The race currently offers a purse of $90,000 and the winner often will run in the Breeders' Cup Juvenile Fillies.

First run in 1975, the race was previously known as the Gardenia Stakes until 1996 when it became the Jack Smallwood Stakes for 1997 and 1998. It was renamed the Brave Raj Breeders' Cup Stakes in 1999 to honor Brave Raj, the 1996 American Champion Two-Year-Old Filly who won the Breeders' Cup Juvenile Fillies.

Silk Ridge set a new stakes record in winning the 2007 race.

== Winners since 2001 ==
Year	Winner	Jockey	Trainer	Owner	Time
2008	Renda	Sebastian Madrid	Juan D. Arias	Richard Rowan	1:45.88
2007	Silk Ridge	Manuel Aguilar	Gordon R. Potter	Karen Keen	1:44.60
2006	Gal Wonder	Rosemary Homeister, Jr.	Larry Pilotti	Carrol Castille	1:47.33
2005	Mia's Reflection	Manoel Cruz	Barry R. Rose	Rose Family Stable	1:47.79
2004	Dansetta Light	Jose Lopez	David Brownlee	J D Farms	1:40.09
2003	Marina De Chavon	Manuel Aguilar	Joseph C. Cantanese III	Establo Madoca	1:46.37
2002	Ivanavinalot	Manoel Cruz	Kathleen O'Connell	Gilbert Campbell	1:45.04
2001	Ms Brookski	Rosemary Homeister, Jr.	Reed Combest	Phil Combest	1:47.16
