= Rosemary Homeister Jr. =

American jockey (born 1972)

Personal information
- Born: July 5, 1972 (age 54) Hollywood, Florida United States
- Occupation: Jockey

Horse racing career
- Sport: Horse racing
- Career wins: 2,700 (ongoing)

Major racing wins
- Desert Vixen Stakes (1998); J J's Dream Stakes (1998, 2003); Princess Rooney Handicap (1999); Calder Derby (2000); Spend A Buck Handicap (2000); Brave Raj Breeders' Cup Stakes (2001, 2006); Clasico del Caribe (2001); Columbiana Handicap (2001); La Prevoyante Handicap (2002); My Charmer Handicap (2003); Kent Stakes (2009); Kentucky Cup Turf Stakes (2009); Sycamore Stakes (2009); Valedictory Stakes (2009); W. L. McKnight Handicap (2009); Florida Oaks (2010); Tampa Bay Breeders Cup Stakes (2010); Fantasy Stakes (2015)

Racing awards
- American Champion Apprentice Jockey (1992); Leading Jockey at Hialeah Park (2001); Leading Jockey at Colonial Downs (2009); Babe Didrikson Zaharias Award (2003)

Honors
- Calder Race Course Hall of Fame (2006); Puerto Rico Horse Racing Hall of Fame (2008)

Significant horses
- Cloudy's Knight, No Inflation, Supah Blitz

Rosemary Homeister Jr. (born July 5, 1972) is a retired American jockey in Thoroughbred racing.

== Background ==
Both of Homeister's parents were jockeys, and as a result she grew up riding horses. Her mother is now a horse trainer at the Calder Race Course, where Rosemary won her first race as an apprentice jockey. In 1991, she briefly attended Broward Community College but left to develop a career in racing.

Homeister started her career working with horses as an exercise rider and breaking yearlings before beginning her riding apprenticeship in 1992. She was successful that year, becoming the first woman to win the Eclipse Award for Outstanding Apprentice Jockey in the United States. She was originally the runner-up, but winner Jesus Armando Bracho from Venezuela was suspended, then surrendered his award for falsifying his racing papers. Two years later, she went to the awards ceremony to accept the award. Since then, Homeister has won more than 2000 races at tracks in Texas, New Mexico, Oklahoma and along the East Coast of the United States from Florida to New York. In 1995, she and her mother were profiled by CBS News Sunday Morning.

In 2000 and 2001, she was the United States leading female jockey in wins. In 2001, she was the first (and so far only) female jockey to win the Clasico del Caribe conducting the Panamanian filly Alexia. In 2003, she became only the fifth woman to ride in the Kentucky Derby, finishing 13th aboard Supah Blitz in a race won by Funny Cide.

Homeister retired in November 2004 after thirteen years of competition, having won 1,726 races from 12,907 starts. However, she returned to racing in June 2006 and on September 3 of that year was inducted into the Calder Race Course Hall of Fame.

As of December 2006, she is divorced from jockey José Ferrer, according to an interview she gave TVG Network's Lady Luck.

At Tampa Bay Downs on December 18, 2008, Homeister won her 2000th race.

On February 11, 2011, she announced that she was pregnant and would not ride for an indefinite period, and then returned to race riding in 2012. She rode the filly Include Betty in the 2015 Kentucky Oaks.

Rosemary Homeister retired from racing on September 28, 2015.

== Racing awards and achievements ==
Rosemary Homeister has won 102 Stakes races, four being Grade 2s. She has had been many firsts in the racing world. Winning the 1992 Eclipse Award as an outstanding apprentice jockey and the first and only woman to be invited, ride in and win the Clasico Del Caribe on a filly, named Alexia, against all-male riders and horses.

- 1992–1993 – Leading Apprentice Jockey at Monmouth Park
- 1992 – The first female to win the Eclipse Award for Outstanding Apprentice Jockey
- 1992 – Leading Rider at the Tropical at Calder Meeting
- 2000 – No. 1 in wins among female jockeys in the United States
- 2001 – First and only female jockey to win Puerto Rico's Clasico Internacional del Caribe
- 2001 – Only woman rider to win the Leading Rider Title at Hialeah Park
- 2001 – No. 1 in wins among female jockeys in the United States
- 2002 – No. 1 in wins among female Jockeys in the United States
- 2003 – First jockey to receive the Babe Didrikson Zaharias Award
- 2003 – Fifth woman to ride in the Kentucky Derby in 129 years (Supah Blitz) finished 13th
- 2004 – Retired from horse racing for about 18 months
- 2006 – Inducted into the Calder Race Course Hall of Fame
- 2008 – Second Leading Rider at Tampa Bay Downs
- 2008 – First woman to be inducted into Puerto Rico's racing Hall of Fame on December 5
- 2008 – Won her 2000th race on December 18, on "Rusty Should Run" for trainer Sam Cronk
- 2008 – Tampa Bay Downs Jockey of the Month – December 20, 2008
- 2008 – Third leading female jockey in the country
- 2008–2009 – Second leading rider at Tampa Bay Downs with over $1.1 million in earnings
- 2009 – Colonial Downs – John D. Marsh Stakes ($50,000) on Hugo (Trainer Hamilton Smith), Daniel Van Clief Stakes ($50,000) on Pleasant Strike (Trainer Todd Pletcher) and The Da Hoss Stakes ($50,000) on Izzy Speaking (Trainer Hamilton Smith)
- 2009 – July 20, became the second leading female jockey of all time with 2,138.
- 2009 – Leading rider at Colonial Downs
- 2009 – July 25, won the $100,000 "Lady Cantebury Stakes" on Happiness Is for Tom Proctor on Claiming Crown Day at Cantebury Park in Minnesota
- 2009 – August 23, won The Pearl Necklace Stakes $50,000 on Blind Date for Hamilton Smith at Laurel Park (1 mile on the dirt – sat just off the pace)
- 2009 – August 23, became the Second Leading rider at Laurel Park with 9 Wins and $219,330 in earnings.
- 2009 – September 5, won the Kent Stakes Grade 3 $250,000 on No Inflation for Tom Proctor at Delaware Park (1 1/2 Turf – wire to wire)
- 2009 – September 19, won the Kentucky Cup Turf Grade 3 $150,000 on Cloudy's Knight for Jonathan Sheppard at Kentucky Downs (1 1/2 Turf – came from off the pace)
- 2009 – October 22, won the $125,000 Grade 3 Sycamore Stakes on Cloudy's Knight for Johathan Sheppard at Keenland.
- 2009 – November 7, finished 2nd in the Breeders Cup Marathon (Santa Anita) on Cloudy's Knight for Jonathan Sheppard.
- 2009 – December 17, won 4 races out of six on the day at Tampa Bay Downs
- 2009 – December 19, Honored with Jockey of the month at Tampa Bay Downs
- 2010 – February, won the $75,000 Suncoast Stakes on Diva Delight for trainer David Vivian – (1 1/16 dirt)
- 2011 – August 21, gave birth to a girl named Victoria Rose
- 2011 – November, won on her second race back for trainer Eric & Kay Reed on Eden Star.
- 2012 – Third Leading Rider at Arlington Park – first year riding at this track.

After retiring from horse racing Rosemary took her passion in the Health and Wellness industry by becoming a Certified Personal Trainer and Fitness Nutrition Specialist. She went on to compete in Bikini Fitness winning her first show and then competing internationally to finish second among top competitors.

== Year-end charts ==
Chart (2000–present)	Peak position
National Earnings List for Jockeys 2000	69
National Earnings List for Jockeys 2001	51
National Earnings List for Jockeys 2008	69
National Earnings List for Jockeys 2009	57
National Earnings List for Jockeys 2010	61
National Earnings List for Jockeys 2012	79
