= Elvis Trujillo =

American jockey

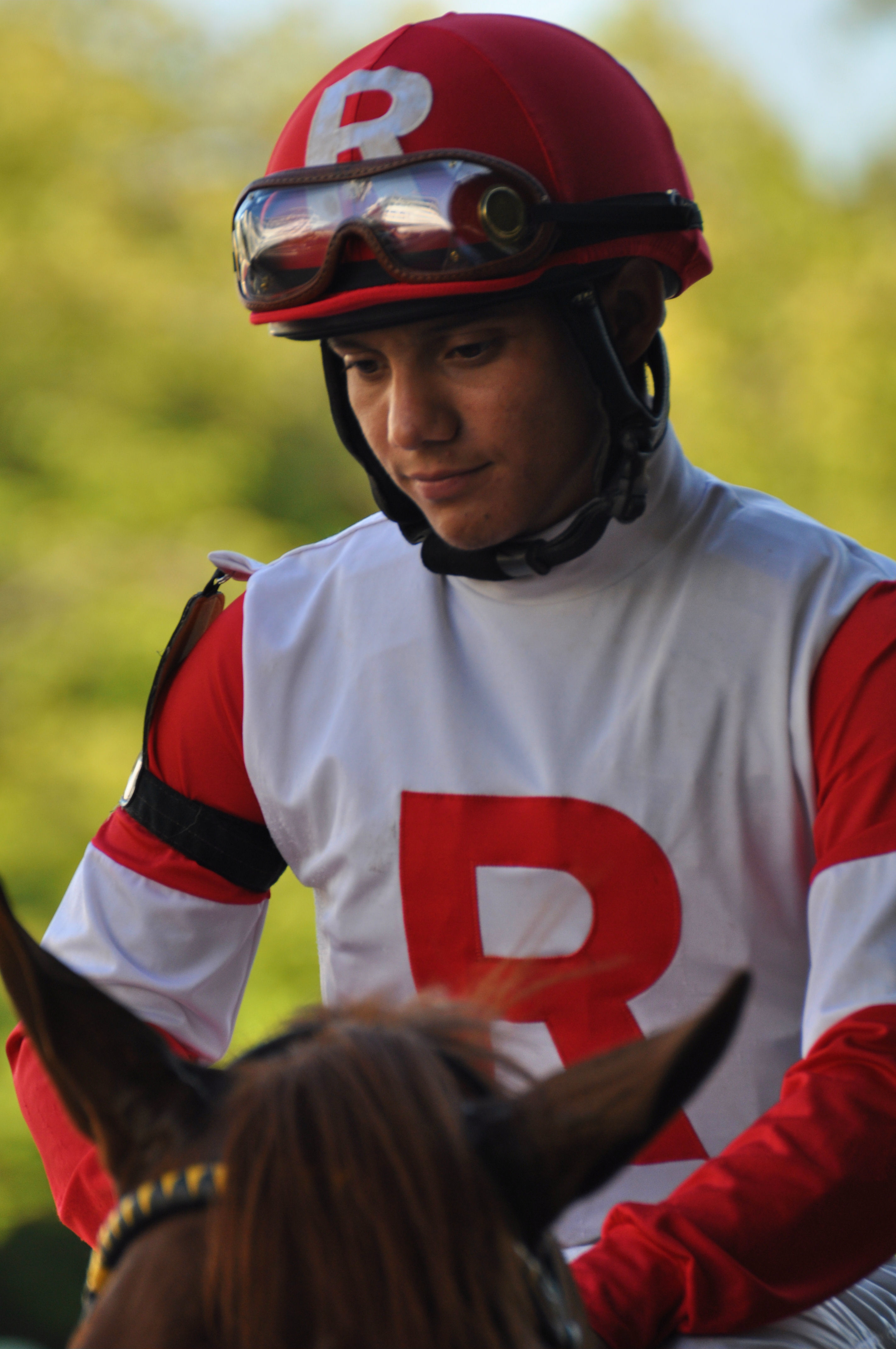
- Trujillo at Monmouth Park in August 2011

Personal information
- Born: October 7, 1983 (age 42) Panama City, Panama
- Occupation: Jockey

Horse racing career
- Sport: Horse racing
- Career wins: 2,102

Major racing wins
- Monmouth Oaks (2005, 2011); Cornhusker Handicap (2006, 2007); Memorial Day Handicap (2006, 2007); Frances A. Genter Stakes (2006); Ballerina Stakes (2007); Forward Gal Stakes (2007); Smile Sprint Handicap (2007); Kenny Noe Jr. Handicap (2007, 2008, 2009); Stage Door Betty Handicap (2007); W. L. McKnight Handicap (2007, 2008); Carry Back Stakes (2008); Clement L. Hirsch Turf Championship (2009); Mac Diarmida Handicap (2009, 2010); United Nations Stakes (2009); Molly Pitcher Stakes (2009); Appleton Stakes (2009); Herecomesthebride Stakes (2009); Philip H. Iselin Stakes (2009); Orchid Handicap (2010); Princess Rooney Handicap (2010); Sapling Stakes (2009, 2011); Miami Mile Handicap (2011); Laurel Dash Stakes (2012); La Prevoyante Handicap (2012); Jersey Shore Stakes (2013); Holy Bull Stakes (2013); Cougar II Handicap (2014); L.A. Woman Stakes (2014); Native Diver Stakes (2014); Royal Heroine Stakes (2014); La Brea Stakes (2014); Sham Stakes (2015); Last Tycoon Stakes (2015); Sixty Sails Handicap (2015); Noble Damsel Stakes (2015); Santa Monica Stakes (2015); General George Stakes (2018) Breeders' Cup wins: Breeders' Cup Filly & Mare Sprint (2007)

Racing awards
- Mexico Jockey Apprentice 2001, Eclipse Awards Apprentice 2002 (United States)

Honours
- Leading rider Calder 2007, leading rider 2009, 2010, & 2012 at Monmouth Park Racetrack

Significant horses
- Forever Together, Presious Passion, Maryfield, Mach Ride, Sam's Sister, Itsmyluckyday, Bayou's Lasie, My Adonis, Paranda, Siphon City, Acceptance, Jessica is Back, Chirac, Kiss the Kid, Motovato, Speak Easy Gall

Elvis Raúl Trujillo (born 7 October 1983) is a Panamanian jockey in American Thoroughbred horse racing best known for riding Maryfield to victory in the 2007 Breeders' Cup Filly & Mare Sprint. He is known for being the regular rider of Precious Passion. Born in Panama City, where he began his career as a jockey, he came to the United States in 2002. Since 2017, he has surpassed more than $70,000,000 in purse earnings and has won more than 2,000 races.

He is the winner of more than 50 graded stakes, such as the 2007 Breeders' Cup Filly & Mare Sprint. Trujillo has also won major graded stakes such as the 2008 & 2009 United Nation Stakes, Summit of Speed Smile Sprint, La Brea Stakes, Princess Rooney Handicap, Clement L. Hirsch Memorial Turf Championship Stakes, and many more major horse races.

Trujillo rode in his native Panama and in Mexico City before emigrating to the United States in 2001, where in the fall he got his first win at Hollywood Park Racetrack.

In 2009, Trujillo was the leading rider at Monmouth Park with 129 wins in 601 starts, beating Eddie Castro, Carlos H. Marquez Jr., and Joe Bravo in the overall standing.

== Background ==
Trujillo was born in Panama City, Panama, where he learned to ride at the Laffit Pincay Jockey School. In 2001 he got his first win in Panama at Hipodromo Presidente Remon. That same year he moved to Mexico City where he met his future wife(Raquel Trujillo) and would win more than 80 races. In 2001, he would migrate to the United States where in the fall he would get his first win at Hollywood Park Racetrack. In 2002, his son would be born in Mexico City, Mexico where he would have to bring his family to the United States of America and start a new chapter of his life.

== Personal life ==
Trujillo is a representative of the Jockeys' Guild for the state of Florida and New Jersey. He is also a member of the Permanently Disabled Jockeys Fund.

Trujillo is married to Raquel Trujillo. Residing in Miramar, Florida, they have three children together, sons Elvis Jr, Emanuel, and Jorge Trujillo.

Trujillo rode his last race as a professional jockey in 2018. As of 2020, he was a trainer based in Maryland.

He lives in Gallatin County, Kentucky.

== Major races ==
2015	Santa Monica Stakes (Gr. 2)	Sam's Sister
2015	Noble Damsel Stakes (Gr. 3)	Recepta
2015	Sixty Sails Handicap (Gr. 3)	Yahilwa
2015	Last Tycoon Stakes (Gr. 3)	Si Sage (FR)
2015	Sham Stakes (Gr. 3)	Calculator
2014	La Brea Stakes (Gr. 1)	Sam's Sister
2014	Royal Heroine Stakes (Gr. 2)	Parranda
2014	Native Diver Stakes (Gr. 3)	Big Cazanova (ARG)
2014	L.A. Woman Stakes (Gr. 3)	Top Kisser
2014	Cougar II Handicap (Gr. 3)	Irish Surf
2013	Holy Bull Stakes (Gr. 3)	Itsmyluckyday
2013	Jersey Shore Stakes (Gr. 3)	Rainbow Heir
2012	La Prevoyante Handicap (Gr. 3)	Closing Range
2011	Monmouth Oaks (Gr. 3)	Savvy Supreme
2011	Miami Mile Handicap (Gr. 3)	Successful Mission
2011	Sapling Stakes (Gr. 3)	She Digs Me
2010	Princess Rooney Handicap (Gr. 1)	Jessica Is Back
2010	Mac Diarmida Stakes (Gr. 2)	Presious Passion
2010	Orchid Stakes (Gr. 3)	Speak Easy Gal
2009	United Nations Stakes (Gr. 1)	Presious Passion
2009	Clement L. Hirsch Memorial Turf Championship Stakes (Gr. 1)	Presious Passion
2009	Molly Pitcher Stakes (Gr. 2)	Luna Vega
2009	Mac Diarmida Stakes (Gr. 2)	Presious Passion
2009	Philip H. Iselin Stakes (Gr. 3)	Chirac
2009	Sapling Stakes (Gr. 3)	Western Smoke
2009	Herecomesthebride Stakes (Gr. 3)	Gozzip Girl
2009	Kenny Noe Jr. Handicap (Gr. 3)	Motovato
2009	Appleton Stakes (Gr. 3)	Kiss the Kid
2008	Carry Back Stakes (Gr. 2)	Golden Spikes
2008	W. L. McKnight Handicap (Gr. 2)	Presious Passion
2008	Kenny Noe Jr. Handicap (Gr. 3)	Yesbyjimminy
2007	Ballerina Stakes (Gr. 1)	Maryfield
2007	Smile Sprint Handicap (Gr. 2)	Mach Ride
2007	Prairie Meadows Cornhusker Handicap (Gr. 2)	Dry Martini
2007	W. L. McKnight Handicap (Gr. 2)	Presious Passion
2007	Forward Gal Stakes (Gr. 2)	Forever Together
2007	Memorial Day Handicap (Gr. 3)	Dry Martini
2007	Fred W. Hooper Handicap (Gr. 3)	Electrify
2007	Stage Door Betty Handicap (Gr. 3)	Bayou's Lassie
2007	Kenny Noe Jr. Handicap (Gr. 3)	Paradise Dancer
2006	Prairie Meadows Cornhusker Breeders' Cup Handicap (Gr. 2)	Siphon City
2006	Memorial Day Handicap (Gr. 3)	Siphon City
2006	Frances A. Genter Stakes (Gr. 3)	Bayou's Lassie
2005	Monmouth Breeders' Cup Oaks (Gr. 3)	Flying Glitter

== Statistics by year ==
Year	Starts	Firsts	Seconds	Thirds	Earnings	All starts
2017	76	9	6	9	$230,660	View
2016	341	43	41	38	$1,173,040	View
2015	608	50	73	59	$3,238,017	View
2014	907	135	110	126	$6,456,827	View
2013	694	98	102	100	$3,919,471	View
2012	997	178	154	122	$6,100,924	View
2011	1,049	199	141	129	$6,305,468	View
2010	1,015	182	144	126	$7,695,264	View
2009	1,243	233	195	178	$8,807,964	View
2008	927	171	138	132	$5,104,880	View
2007	1,448	305	227	209	$8,220,406	View
2006	1,053	177	161	155	$4,188,065	View
2005	621	77	82	95	$2,244,516	View
2004	534	55	75	73	$1,463,099	View
2003	376	46	44	50	$1,249,755	View
2002	669	115	101	83	$2,717,741	View
2001	7	1	0	1	$32,760	View

=== Year-end charts ===
Chart (2006–present)	Peak position
National Earnings List for Jockeys 2006	56
National Earnings List for Jockeys 2007	23
National Earnings List for Jockeys 2008	42
National Earnings List for Jockeys 2009	16
National Earnings List for Jockeys 2010	20
National Earnings List for Jockeys 2011	27
National Earnings List for Jockeys 2012	33
National Earnings List for Jockeys 2013	57
National Earnings List for Jockeys 2014	30
National Earnings List for Jockeys 2015	84
