= Kenny Noe Jr. Handicap =

- Class: Nongraded
- Location: Calder Race Course; Miami Gardens, Florida
- Inaugurated: 1975
- Race type: Thoroughbred - Flat racing
- Website: www.calderracecourse.com/_index

Race information
- Distance: 6.5 furlongs
- Surface: Dirt
- Track: left-handed
- Qualification: Three-years-old & up
- Purse: $90,000

The Kenny Noe Jr. Handicap is a thoroughbred horse race at Calder Race Course in Miami Gardens, Florida. It is a race on dirt over a distance of six and a half furlongs for horses age three and up.

The race was first run in 1975 as the Sunny Isle Handicap. Its name was changed for the 1995 running to honor Kenny Noe Jr., a former President of Calder Race course.

== Winners ==
Year	Winner	Age	Jockey	Trainer	Owner	Time
2014	Speechify	4	Paco Lopez	Ralph E. Nicks	Team Valor International	1:10.52
2013	Simmstown	5			Silverton Hill	1:17.12
2012	Dual Exhauzt	4	Jesus M. Rios	William P. White	GZS Stable	1:17.31
2010	Race Not Run					
2009	Motovato	4			Team Valor International/Barber	1:24.44
