= Mark A. Hennig =

American horse trainer

Mark Hennig
Personal information
- Born: April 10, 1965 (age 61) Mansfield, Ohio, United States
- Occupation: Trainer

Horse racing career
- Sport: Horse racing
- Career wins: 1,366 + (Ongoing)

Major racing wins
- Bonnie Miss Stakes (1991, 2001); Arlington Million (1993); Manhattan Handicap (1993); Man o' War Stakes (1993); San Gabriel Handicap (1993); San Marcos Stakes (1993); Santa Anita Derby (1993); United Nations Stakes (1993); Buena Vista Handicap (1994); Jerome Handicap (1994); Jersey Derby (1994, 2001); Ballston Spa Handicap (1997); Broward Handicap (1997); Humana Distaff Handicap (1998); Jamaica Handicap (1998); Next Move Handicap (1998, 1999, 2002); Shuvee Handicap (1998); Fashion Stakes (1999, 2000, 2005); Maker's Mark Mile Stakes (1999); Kentucky Stakes (2000); Matron Stakes (2000); Deputy Minister Handicap (2001); Ladies Handicap (2001); Bed O' Roses Handicap (2002, 2003); Brooklyn Handicap (2002); Dwyer Stakes (2002); Ogden Phipps Handicap (2002); Personal Ensign Stakes (2002); Pimlico Distaff (2002); Princess Rooney Handicap (2002, 2003); Calder Derby (2004); Gulfstream Park Handicap (2005); Pimlico Special (2005); Canadian Turf Handicap (2007); National Museum of Racing Hall of Fame Stakes (2008); Salvator Mile Handicap (2008); Florida Oaks (2009); Hollie Hughes Handicap (2012); Davona Dale Stakes (2013); Vagrancy Handicap (2014); Princess Rooney Stakes (2015); Beaugay Stakes (2016); Ballston Spa Handicap (2016); Swale Stakes (2018); Gazelle Stakes (2018)

Significant horses
- Eddington, Gygistar, Personal Hope, Prenup, Raging Fever, Star of Cozzene, Summer Colony, Vergennes

Mark A. Hennig (born April 10, 1965, in Mansfield, Ohio) is an American Thoroughbred horse racing trainer.

== Racing career ==
Born into a horse racing family, his father, John Hennig, was also a trainer. After working with his father, Mark was encouraged to work for other outfits in the industry. Mark Hennig became an assistant to Hall of Fame trainer D. Wayne Lukas before going out on his own in 1993. The launch of Hennig's training stable was a racing rarity with its immediate impact in major races. At the young of twenty-eight, Hennig went on to finish in the Nation's top ten Trainers with earnings over $4,000,000. He was fortunate to train not only Star of Cozzene, winner of The GI Arlington Million, but also Personal Hope, winner of the GI Santa Anita Derby. In total, Mark's horses won 19 stakes that year and placed in 35 more. In 1995 Mark went on to form a public stable, largely due to the support of Edward P. Evans, for whom he won 45 graded stakes in his career.

Since starting his stable 26 years ago, Mark has posted 26 straight years of over $1 million in purses. Hennig trained horses have won over 100 graded stakes and over $70 million in earnings. Hennig has recently teamed up with several ownership groups, most notably the prestigious owners Donald and Donna Adam and their Courtlandt Farm Outfit. The pairing has seen success with multiple stakes winners.
