= Abel Castellano Jr. =

Venezuelan jockey

Personal information
- Born: June 6, 1983 (age 43) Maracaibo, Venezuela
- Occupation: Jockey

Horse racing career
- Sport: Horse racing
- Career wins: 1,685 (4/21/13)

Major racing wins
- Miami Mile Handicap (2001) Geisha Handicap (2003, 2004, 2012); Allaire duPont Distaff Stakes (2004); All Brandy Stakes (2007); Blue Hen Stakes (2007); Private Terms Stakes (2008); Primonetta Stakes (2008, 2011, 2012, 2013); Maryland Million Distaff Handicap (2012); Shine Again Stakes (2012); Skipat Stakes (2012); What A Summer Stakes (2013) Conniver Stakes (2012, 2013)

Racing awards
- Leading jockey at Laurel Park (fall) (2003)

Significant horses
- Bold Affair, Silmaril

Abel Castellano Jr. (born June 6, 1983) is a Venezuelan jockey in Thoroughbred horse racing who rode his first winner on September 22, 1999, at Santa Rita Race Course in his native Venezuela. The following year he began riding in the United States at Gulfstream Park in 2000. Racing runs in Castellano's family. His father, who died in 2000, his uncle and a brother all have been jockeys. He considers his father to be biggest influence on his career as his brother Javier Castellano recipient of four Eclipse Award for Outstanding Jockey in the row (2013, 2014, 2015 and 2016).
