= Martin D. Wolfson =

American Thoroughbred racehorse trainer (born 1953)

Marty Wolfson
Personal information
- Born: August 3, 1953 (age 73) Washington, D.C., U.S.
- Occupation: Horse trainer

Horse racing career
- Sport: Horse racing
- Career wins: 1,654+ (ongoing)

Major racing wins
- Miami Mile Handicap (1992, 1994, 1999); Desert Vixen Stakes (1993); Flamingo Stakes (1993); Ohio Derby (1993); Princess Rooney Handicap (1995, 1996, 2013); Ballerina Stakes (1996); Comely Stakes (1998); Mac Diarmida Handicap (1998); Royal Palm Handicap (1999); Affirmed Stakes (2000); Swale Stakes (2004); Spinster Stakes (2005); Maker's Mark Mile Stakes (2006); Calder Derby (2006); Bonnie Miss Stakes (2008); Oaklawn Handicap Carry Back Stakes (2008)(2009); Sunshine Millions Classic (2009); Personal Ensign Stakes (2009) Breeders' Cup wins: Breeders' Cup Mile (2006)

Honours
- Calder Race Course Hall of Fame (2003)

Significant horses
- Miesque's Approval; Forever Whirl

Martin "Marty" D. Wolfson (born August 3, 1951) is an American trainer of racehorses who began his professional training career in the early 1970s.

== Early life ==
He is the son of Louis Wolfson, owner of Florida's Harbor View Farm who won the U.S. Triple Crown in 1978 with two-time American Horse of the Year, Affirmed. He spent a large part of his childhood on the family horse farm near Ocala in Marion County, Florida. He is the youngest of four siblings.

== Early career ==
Wolfson received his horse-training license when he was 18 years old, and began training with a few of his father's horses at Calder Race Course in Miami Gardens, Florida,. where he is a Calder Hall of Fame inductee. Wolfson conditioned horses for his father as well as Mike Pegram, and Edmund Gann, as well as John Franks and Fred Hooper.

In 2006, a horse he trained, Miesque's Approval, won the Breeders' Cup Mile.

Wolfson earned over $53.6 million in purses during his career. He realized 1,682 wins from 9,059 starts. His best year was 2009 in which he won 67 races of 275 starts, earning $4.2 million.

== Personal life ==
At age 21 he married his high school sweetheart, but divorced after a year and a half. He was married to Karla for 35 years, separating in 2011.

Wolfson was featured nude in the November 1978 issue of Playgirl magazine.
