= Eibar Coa =

Personal information
- Born: February 15, 1971 (age 55) Monagas, Venezuela
- Occupation: Jockey

Horse racing career
- Sport: Horse racing
- Career wins: 4,080

Major racing wins
- Royal Palm Handicap (1996, 1999, 2000); Brooklyn Handicap (1998); Mount Vernon Handicap (1998, 2007); Princess Rooney Handicap (1998); Rebel Stakes (1998); Mount Vernon Handicap (1998, 2007); Cornhusker Breeders' Cup Handicap (2000); Lone Star Derby (2000); Miami Mile Handicap (2000); Texas Mile Stakes (2000); Black Helen Handicap (2001); Monmouth Breeders' Cup Oaks (2001); Calder Derby (2002, 2004); Eatontown Handicap (2002, 2004); Meadowlands Cup (2002, 2005); Tampa Bay Derby (2003); Sunshine Millions Classic (2003); Illinois Derby (2004); Kelso Breeders' Cup Handicap (2004); Sunshine Millions Distaff (2004); Toboggan Handicap (2004); Canadian Turf Handicap (2005); Pimlico Special (2005); Queens County Handicap (2005); Sword Dancer Invitational Handicap (2006); Belmont Futurity Stakes (2007); Gazelle Stakes (2007); Prioress Stakes (2007); Remsen Stakes (2007); Test Stakes (2007); Donn Handicap (2008); Matron Stakes (2008); Sabin Stakes (2008); Spectacular Bid Stakes (2011) Breeders' Cup wins: Breeders' Cup Sprint (2010) Canadian Classic Race wins: Prince of Wales Stakes (2008)

Honours
- Calder Race Course Hall of Fame (2004)

Significant horses
- Victory Gallop, Sir Bear, Lear's Princess, Dream Rush, Big Drama

Eibar Coa Monteverde (born February 15, 1971) is a Venezuelan jockey in American Thoroughbred horse racing.

Coa was born and raised in Venezuela. A five-time judo champion in his teens, he attended jockey school from 1989 to 1991 then began his professional riding career in 1992. He emigrated to the United States in 1993 but went back home.

In 1996, Coa returned to the U.S. to compete at racetracks in Florida, where he became the leading jockey at Calder Race Course in 1996, 1997, 1999, and 2000. In addition, he was the leading jockey at Calder Race Course's Tropical Park meet in 1998 and 1999. On September 7, 1998, he tied a then Calder Race Course record when he rode six winners on a single race card. His success at that track led to his 2004 induction in the Calder Race Course Hall of Fame.

Eibar Coa was the leading jockey at New Jersey's Monmouth Park in 2002 and at Florida's Gulfstream Park the following year. He also has competed successfully on the New York Racing Association (NYRA) circuit, winning riding championships at Aqueduct Racetrack in 2006 and that year became his breakout year as he was tying for that year's fall jockey title at Belmont Park. On December 29, 2006, he joined Hall of Fame inductees Angel Cordero Jr., Steve Cauthen, and Mike E. Smith as the only jockeys in the history of NYRA to win 300 races in one year. He was voted 2006 Jockey of the Year by the New York Thoroughbred Breeders, Inc.

In 2007, Eibar Coa was ranked seventh among all jockeys in the Eastern United States with total earnings of $4,237,059, and was leading jockey at the Belmont Park fall meet.

Coa was temporarily paralyzed from the neck down and lost part of his lungs after fracturing his C-4 vertebra in a racing accident at Gulfstream Park on February 18, 2011, In spite of being designated a quadriplegic with little hope for recovery, he beat the odds and is now walking on his own and progressing toward what he hopes will be a full recuperation.

Chart (2000–2010)	Peak position
National Earnings List for Jockeys 2000	29
National Earnings List for Jockeys 2001	13
National Earnings List for Jockeys 2002	15
National Earnings List for Jockeys 2003	19
National Earnings List for Jockeys 2004	22
National Earnings List for Jockeys 2005	13
National Earnings List for Jockeys 2006	7
National Earnings List for Jockeys 2007	7
National Earnings List for Jockeys 2008	9
National Earnings List for Jockeys 2009	24
National Earnings List for Jockeys 2010	29
