= René R. Douglas =

Panamanian jockey

René Douglas
Personal information
- Born: March 3, 1967 (age 59) Panama City, Panama
- Occupation: Jockey

Horse racing career
- Sport: Horse racing
- Career wins: 3,587

Major racing wins
- Lawrence Realization Stakes (1989); Washington, D.C. International (1989); Desert Vixen Stakes (1992); Old Hat Stakes (1992); Black Helen Handicap (1993, 1995); Frances A. Genter Stakes (1993, 2000, 2007); Del Mar Derby (1995); Affirmed Stakes (1995); Del Mar Debutante Stakes (1996); Excelsior Breeders' Cup Handicap (1999); Arlington Oaks (2001, 2002); Hill Prince Stakes (2001); Stars and Stripes Turf Handicap (2001, 2002, 2003, 2004); American Derby (2002); American Handicap (2002); Arlington Classic (2002, 2003, 2004); Gardenia Handicap (2003); Ashland Stakes (2004); Sunshine Millions Turf (2004); Yellow Ribbon Stakes (2004); Sunshine Millions Distaff (2005); La Habra Stakes (2005); San Clemente Handicap (2005); Arlington-Washington Futurity Stakes (2006); Ohio Derby (2006); Summer Stakes (2006); Beverly D. Stakes (2007); Davona Dale Stakes (2007); Round Table Stakes (2007); Woodford Stakes (2007); Rushaway Stakes (2008); Pat O'Brien Handicap (2008); Chilukki Handicap (2008); Purple Violet Stakes (2008) American Classics wins: Belmont Stakes (1996) Breeders' Cup wins: Breeders' Cup Juvenile Fillies (2006)

Significant horses
- Caltech, Caressing, Editor's Note, Deputy Glitters, Dreaming of Anna
- Updated on March 24, 2007

René R. Douglas (born March 3, 1967, in Panama City, Panama) is a former Panamanian jockey who competed in American Thoroughbred horse racing. Born into a horse racing family, after attending jockey school Douglas rode in his native Panama for a year and a half before moving to the United States in 1983. His first major win came in 1989 in the prestigious Washington, D.C. International. In 1996, he rode Editor's Note to victory in the Belmont Stakes, the third leg of the U.S. Triple Crown series.

René Douglas won three riding titles at Calder Race Course and Hialeah Park Race Track and a record four in a row from 2001 through 2004 at Arlington Park. He won seven races on a single card at Arlington Park on July 24, 2003, and twice won six on a single card at Calder Race Course.

In the richest win of his career, Rene Douglas captured the 2006 Breeders' Cup Juvenile Fillies aboard Dreaming of Anna.

Competing in the May 23, 2009 Arlington Matron Handicap at Arlington Park, Douglas's horse, Born to Be, clipped heels with the fading pacesetter Boudoir and fell forward and flipped on to her back, crushing Douglas underneath. Jockey Jamie Theriot's horse, Sky Mom, was disqualified by the stewards for causing the accident. Douglas remained pinned under Born to Be and had to be extricated by track personnel. Born to Be was later euthanized and Theriot was suspended for 30 days by the Illinois Racing Board for his role in the accident. The injuries left Rene Douglas paralyzed from the waist down. He uses a wheelchair, and after spinal surgery and a lengthy rehabilitation, he has led an active life since and remains involved in racing as an owner.

== Year-end charts ==
Chart (2000–2008)	Peak position
National Earnings List for Jockeys 2000	53
National Earnings List for Jockeys 2001	22
National Earnings List for Jockeys 2002	21
National Earnings List for Jockeys 2003	29
National Earnings List for Jockeys 2004	17
National Earnings List for Jockeys 2005	28
National Earnings List for Jockeys 2006	40
National Earnings List for Jockeys 2007	33
National Earnings List for Jockeys 2008	28
