= Calder Casino =

Casino in Florida, United States

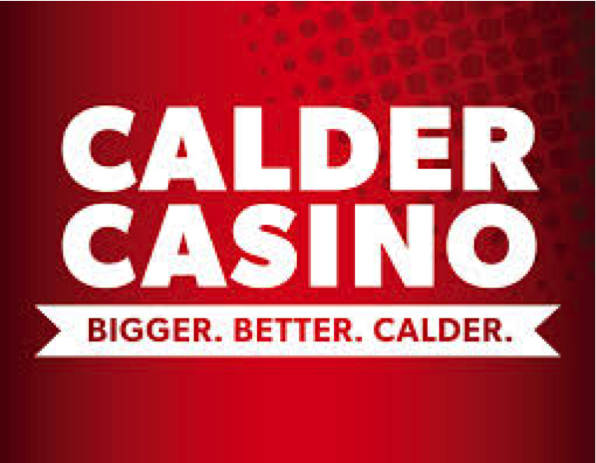

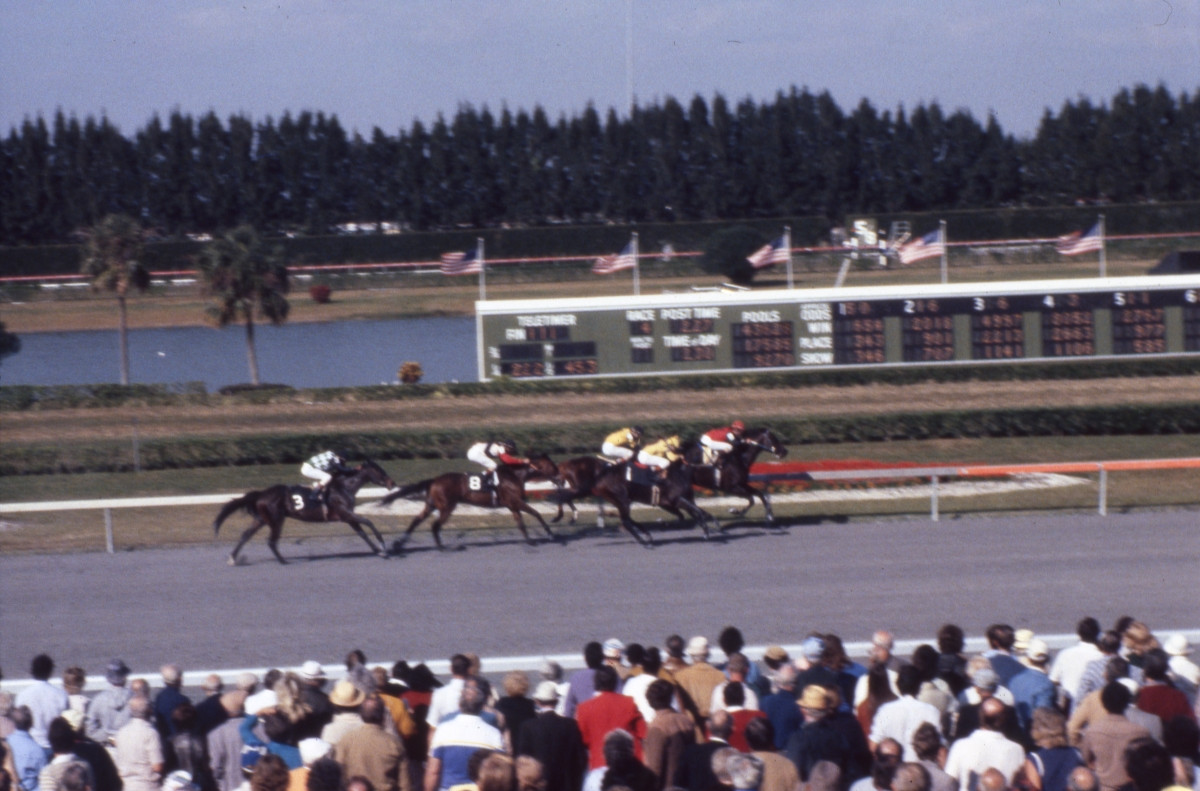
- Horse race at Calder, January 1980.
- Interactive map of Calder Casino
- Location: 21001 NW 27th Ave. Miami Gardens, FL 33056; 25°58′2″N 80°14′33″W
- Opened: May 6, 1971 (racetrack); January 22, 2010 (casino)
- Closed: November 28, 2020 (racetrack)
- Owner: Churchill Downs Inc. Racing operations leased to Stronach Group
- Website: Official website

Calder Casino is a casino and former Thoroughbred racetrack located in Miami Gardens, Florida. It includes slots, electronic table games, and bingo. The racetrack operated from 1971 to 2020, while the casino opened in 2010, and continues to operate.

It was previously located in the Lake Lucerne census-designated place. In 2003, the unincorporated area where Calder is located became the City of Miami Gardens, the third-largest city in Miami-Dade County.

In 2014, Calder's horse racing operations were leased to the Stronach Group, operators of Gulfstream Park. From then onwards, the track was known as Gulfstream Park West. Calder Casino is a wholly owned property of Churchill Downs Incorporated and has kept its original name.

== History ==
=== Calder Race Course ===
Calder Race Course (later known as Gulfstream Park West from 2014 to 2020) was a Thoroughbred racetrack that operated from 1971 to 2020. The length of the main track was one-mile (1.6 km) with 1/4 Mile and 7 furlong chutes. The surface was 12-inch sand and marl (clay) base with 4.5 inches of sand and marl cushion. The turf course was 7/8 mile in circumfrence with a 1/4-mile chute. The surface was Tifton #419 Bermuda grass. The stable area had stalls for 450 thoroughbreds plus receiving barn, feed rooms, tack rooms, detention barns, and living quarters.

=== History ===
In the mid-1960s, real estate developer Stephen A. Calder envisioned summertime horse racing in Florida; in 1965, on the advice of Mr. Calder, the Florida Legislature approved a bill allowing for it. Prior to this time, a fall meet was held at Tropical Park Race Track in Miami and winter / spring meets at Hialeah Park, and Gulfstream Park in Broward County.

In 1970, Stephen Calder received a permit for summertime racing but the meet was run at Tropical Park because construction was not complete at Calder.

On May 6, 1971, Calder Race Course held its first day of racing. When William L. McKnight became the new owner of Tropical Park, he stated his intentions of closing the track and switching the dates to the Calder track, in which he was one of the principal investors. Racing ceased at Tropical Park in 1972.

The 1980s brought about renovations and expansions and two purchases. The first purchase was by Bertram R. Firestone and the second was by Kawasaki Leasings, Inc.

In 1992 the "Festival of the Sun" was introduced.

By 1997, simulcasting was introduced (so bets could be placed at Calder on races from other tracks). The handle increased significantly; the track increased purses.

In January 1999, Churchill Downs Incorporated (CDI) purchased Calder Race Course for approximately $86 million. In the first years of the new century the track introduced the "Florida Million" and the "Summit of Speed".

Calder's Summit of Speed has produced several Breeders' Cup champions and Eclipse Award winners since its start in 2000. (The Eclipse award is the highest honor bestowed in American racing). In its short history, the Summit of Speed attracted some of the country's top sprinters, including Cajun Beat and Orientate who both went on to win Breeders' Cup Sprint championship races (Orientate 2002, Cajun Beat 2003).

In 2005, Lost in the Fog won at Calder, although was later defeated in the Breeders' Cup. The Summit of Speed turned out to be the single biggest day in the history of Calder. In 2004, over $10.8 million was wagered on the event.

On June 4, 2005, jockey Eddie Castro set the North American record for the most wins in a day at one track, winning 9 races at Calder.

The world record for the most spent on a Thoroughbred at sale took place at Calder in 2006 when a two-year-old horse sold for $16 million. The horse was later named The Green Monkey.

In late 2009, Calder changed its official name to Calder Casino & Race Course. The grand opening of the Calder Casino was celebrated in January 2010.

On August 24, 2013, jockey Antonio A. Gallardo set the record for the most stakes wins in a day and in a row, winning 4 consecutive stake races in the Juvenile Showcase.

After head-to-head racing between Calder and nearby Gulfstream Park in 2013 and 2014, CDI and the Stronach Group announced an agreement where the Stronach Group would manage Calder's racing operations, and CDI would operate the Calder Casino. After the agreement, Gulfstream announced it would operate a two-month meet at Calder in the fall under the name Gulfstream Park West. Under the changes, the track's code for official racing programs was changed from CRC to GPW.

In April 2015, CDI demolished approximately 1,400 stalls in an area marked for non-racing commercial re-development. In July 2015, Gulfstream Park was informed that the Calder grandstand – owned by CDI – will not be open to the public for the 2015 Gulfstream Park West meet except for racing officials, and that the seven-story structure will be demolished once the meet has concluded. Demolition was completed in October 2016 and The Stronach Group recommended everyone watch and wager at Gulfstream Park.

In October 2020, it was announced that the track would close after Gulfstream Park's 6-year lease on the track was due to expire. The racetrack ran its final race card on November 28.

On November 22, 2021, Churchill Downs, Inc. sold 115.7 acres of the former track's land to real estate company Link Logistics for $291,000,000 USD. In mid-2023, demolition of the racetrack began and has since been completed.

=== Calder Casino ===
Calder Casino opened on January 22, 2010 and features a 100,000-square-foot (9,300 m^{2}) gaming floor with 1,100 slot machines, including video poker, as well as electronic roulette and blackjack. Live entertainment can be found at Calder Casino on a weekly basis as well as a popular ladies night.

A player's club, VIP lounge, and dining options such as The Buffet, Lucky's Restaurant and Center Bar can all be found at the location. It is a non-smoking casino, however the Backyard Casino, South Florida's newest and largest smoking friendly open-air casino, opened at Calder Casino on May 19, 2018. The Backyard Casino at Calder hosts 75 games.

In July 2026, Churchill Downs, Inc. proposed selling nine of its casinos, including Calder.

== TV personalities ==
- Ron Nicolleti (1989–2008, 2014–2020)
- Caton Bredar (1992–1994)
- Todd Schrupp (1991–1998)
- Bobby Neuman (1999–2014)
- Meredith Gleaves (2008–2010)
- Anthony Schweiker (2010–2011)
- Pete Aiello (2014–2020)
- Chris Griffin (2016–2017)
- Acacia Clement (2016–2020)
- Jason Blewitt (2017–2020)
- Jason Beem (2018–2019)

== Jockey colony ==
Gulfstream Park West's jockey colony is reflective of the diversity of Miami. With the Gulfstream West oval serving as a launching pad for jockeys coming from Latin America and the Caribbean, many jockeys have gained valuable riding experience before success at other racetracks across the country.

Top jockeys who started their careers at Calder include Javier and Abel Castellano (Venezuela), Eibar Coa (Venezuela), Rene Douglas (Panama), Shaun Bridgmohan (Jamaica), Edgar Prado (Peru), Pedro Rodriguez (Cuba), Alex Solis (Panama), José Ferrer (Puerto Rico), Jorge Chavez (Peru), José A. Santos (Chile), Cornelio Velásquez (Panama), Manoel Cruz (Brazil), Jacinto Vásquez (Panama-retired) and Eddie Castro (Panama) among others.

In addition, Stewart Elliott of Smarty Jones fame and Gary Boulanger (retired) are a few Canadians who led the ranks at Calder early in their careers.

Winners of the Eclipse Award for Outstanding Apprentice Jockey that hailed from Gulfstream West when they won – Rosemary Homeister (1992), Phil Teator (1997), Shaun Bridgemohan (1998) and Eddie Castro (2003). Jockeys whose careers started at Calder and went on to Eclipse Award for Outstanding Jockey: Javier Castellano (2013, 2014, 2015, 2016), Jerry Bailey (2000–2003; 1995–1997), Jorge Chavez (1999), Mike E. Smith (1993), José A. Santos (1988).

On December 28, 1978, jockey Niconar "Nick" Navarro was killed by a direct lightning strike after completing the second race at Calder Race Course. Navarro had ridden Noble Mischief, and was walking back to the jockey's quarters to rest in time for the fourth race when he was hit by the bolt. According to Jon Roberts, in American Desperado:

At Calder, I had a jockey named Nick Navarro who worked for me. He was one of the good guys. He wouldn't hold horses or charge them or run them on dope. He was very skilled, and when I ran my horses clean, I used Nick.

One day in 1977 [sic] he ran a race for me at Calder. I walked up to him after he finished. He put his hand up to wave, and there was a powerful explosion. A bolt of lightning came out of the sky and hit him.

Multiple news outlets report: the remaining eight races at the track that day were cancelled.

== Calder Race Course Hall of Fame ==
The Calder Hall of Fame was created in 1995 to honor those who have made history at Calder Race Course.

Inductees include:

- Princess Rooney (1995)
- Spend A Buck (1995)
- Frank Gomez (1995)
- Stanley Hough (1995)
- Gene St. Leon (1995)
- Fred W. Hooper (1995)
- José Vélez Jr. (1997)
- Cherokee Run (1998)
- John J. Tammaro Jr. (1999)
- Jacinto Vásquez (1999)
- James E. Bracken (2000)
- Miguel A. Rivera (2000)
- Mike Gonzalez (2001)
- Alex Solis (2002)
- Ocala Stud Farm (2002)
- John A. Franks (2003)
- Mary L. Russ (2003)
- Martin D. Wolfson (2003)
- Eibar Coa (2004)
- Rosemary Homeister Jr. (2006)
- Edward Plesa Jr. (2007)
