= Kingston Stakes =

- Class: Restricted stakes
- Location: Belmont Park; Elmont, New York, United States
- Inaugurated: 1979
- Race type: Thoroughbred – Flat racing
- Website: Kingston Stakes at the NYRA

Race information
- Distance: 1 mile (formerly 1 1/16 miles (8.5 furlongs))
- Surface: Turf
- Track: Left-handed
- Qualification: New York-breds, Three years old & up
- Weight: Assigned
- Purse: US$125,000+

The Kingston Stakes is an American Thoroughbred horse race run annually during the second week of May at Belmont Park in Elmont, New York. Restricted to horses bred in the State of New York, three years of age and older, it is contested on Turf over a distance of a mile and a sixteenth (8 1/2 furlongs).

Since inception in 1979, the Kingstom Handicap has been contested at various distances :

- 1 mile : 2010 to present
- 1 1/16 miles : 1979–1986, 1988, 1994–1995, 2008–2009
- 1 1/8 miles : 1991–1993, 1996–2007
- 1 3/16 miles : 1987, 1989–1990

Inaugurated at Belmont Park in 1979 as the Kingston Handicap, it was run at Aqueduct Racetrack in 1980, 1983, and from 1986 through 1995. the race is named in honor of U.S. Racing Hall of Fame inductee, Kingston The retrospective American Champion Older Male Horse of 1889 and 1890, Kingston's 89 wins is the most in the history of the sport of Thoroughbred horse racing. In addition to being an outstanding runner, Kingston was also the leading sire in North America in 1900 and 1910.

It was contested on dirt in 1980 and again in 1996 and was raced in two divisions in 1989.

== Records ==
Speed record:

Most wins:

- 2 – Draw Shot (1997, 1998)
- 2 – Pebo's Guy (1999, 2001)
- 2 – Banrock (2008, 2009)

Most wins by an owner:

- 2 – Francis Santangelo (1997, 1998)
- 2 – Peter DeStefano (1999, 2001)
- 2 – Nyala Farm (2008, 2009)

Most wins by a jockey:

- 4 – Ángel Cordero Jr. (1981, 1983, 1984, 1990)

Most wins by a trainer:

- 2 – Sidney Watters Jr. (1979, 1984)
- 2 – Philip G. Johnson (1982, 1992)
- 2 – Patrick J. Kelly (1986, 1994)
- 2 – Barclay Tagg (1993, 2006)
- 2 – Angel Penna Jr. (1997, 1998)
- 2 – Thomas M. Bush (2008, 2009)
- 2 – Christophe Clement (2002, 2015)

== Winners ==
Year	Winner	Age	Jockey	Trainer	Owner	Time
2025	Clear Conscience	5	José Ortiz	Mark E. Casse	Gary Barber, Pantofel Stable & Wachtel Stable	1:41.30
2024	Spirit Of St Louis	5	Manny Franco	Chad Brown	Madaket Stables LLC, Michael Dubb, Michael and Richard Schermerhorn	1:37.44
2023	City Man	6	Joel Rosario	Christophe Clement	Reeves Throughbred Racing, Peter Searles and Patty Searles	1:39.46
2016	Tapitation	5	Joel Rosario	Ralph E. Nicks	Whisper Hill Farm	1:35.62
2015	Lubash	8	Junior Alvarado	Christophe Clement	Aliyu Ben J Stables	1:33.07
2014	Kharafa	5	Javier Castellano	Timothy A. Hills	Braverman/Pinch	1:32.85
2013	King Kreesa	4	Irad Ortiz Jr.	Jeremiah Englehart	Gerald & Susan Kresa	1:32.85
2012	Compliance Officer	6	Javier Castellano	Bruce Brown	Klaravich Stables/Lawrence	1:37.11
2011	Pocket Cowboys	5	Edgar Prado	Scott Schwartz	Scott M. Schwartz	1:34.38
2010	Minnie Punt	4	Jose Lezcano	Michael Miceli	Marjac Pino Stable/Bommarito	1:39.73
2009	Banrock	6	Kent Desormeaux	Thomas M. Bush	Nyala Farm	1:45.68
2008	Banrock	5	Kent Desormeaux	Thomas M. Bush	Nyala Farm	1:42.51
2007	Red Zipper	4	Eibar Coa	John Morrison	John Morrison	1:49.37
2006	Dave	5	Javier Castellano	Barclay Tagg	The Three Colleens Stable	1:49.13
2005	Golden Commander	5	Edgar Prado	Philip Serpe	Flying Zee Stable	1:45.20
2004	Quantum Merit	5	Richard Migliore	Del Carroll II	Very Un Stable	1:47.00
2003	Irish Colonial	4	Javier Castellano	Randy Schulhofer	Blue Sky Farm & Fred Martin	1:52.44
2002	Celtic Sky	4	José A. Santos	Christophe Clement	Waterville Lake Stable	1:47.03
2001	Pebo's Guy	7	Joe Bravo	Gary Sciacca	Peter Destefano	1:48.22
2000	Plato's Love	5	Mike Luzzi	Warren Pascuma	Pascuma & Olsen	1:49.03
1999	Pebo's Guy	5	John Velazquez	Leo O'Brien	Peter DeStefano	1:46.60
1998	Draw Shot	5	Jerry D. Bailey	Angel Penna Jr.	Francis Santangelo	1:48.40
1997	Draw Shot	4	Jerry D. Bailey	Angel Penna Jr.	Francis Santangelo	1:47.60
1996	Ormsby	4	Jorge F. Chavez	Sue Alpers	Woodside Stud	1:43.00
1995	Pride Of Summer	7	Mike E. Smith	Anthony J. Bizelia	Touch of Class Stable	1:39.60
1994	Jay Gee	5	Robbie Davis	Patrick J. Kelly	Fox Ridge Farm	1:40.60
1993	Social Retiree	6	José A. Santos	Barclay Tagg	Barclay Tagg	1:48.00
1992	Feten	5	Jean Cruguet	Philip G. Johnson	John A. Franks	1:49.20
1991	Fast 'N' Gold	5	Richard Migliore	Sally A. Bailie	Sally A. Bailie	1:51.00
1990	Kate's Valentine	5	Ángel Cordero Jr.	Sarah A. Lundy	James F. Edwards	1:54.60
1989	Jimmy's Bronco	5	Jean Cruguet	Jose Martinez	Michael Hanafin	1:54.80
1989	Closing Bid	4	Eddie Maple	Willard C. Freeman	Dutch Acres Farm	1:54.00
1988	Catch The Moon	4	Robbie Davis	Thomas M. Waller	Tanrackin Farm	1:45.20
1987	Hudson Newes	3	Joe Badamo	Stanley R. Shapoff	Robert B. Cohen	1:55.80
1986	Island Sun	4	Richard Migliore	Patrick J. Kelly	Live Oak Racing	1:42.60
1985	High Ice	4	Robbie Davis	Del W. Carroll II	William S. Farish III	1:41.80
1984	Slewpy	4	Ángel Cordero Jr.	Sidney Watters Jr.	Equusequity Stable	1:41.40
1983	Thunder Puddles	4	Ángel Cordero Jr.	John P. Campo	Rockwood Stable	1:43.00
1982	Naskra's Breeze	5	Jean-Luc Samyn	Philip G. Johnson	Broadmoor Stable	1:44.40
1981	Adlibber	4	Ángel Cordero Jr.	Jan H. Nerud	Morton Fink	1:42.80
1980	Dedicated Rullah	4	Ruben Hernandez	Ramon M. Hernandez	Assunta Louis Farm	1:44.40
1979	Sweet Woodruff	4	Michael Venezia	Sidney Watters Jr.	William C. MacMillen Jr.	1:41.40
