= Athenia Stakes =

- Class: Listed
- Location: Belmont Park; Elmont, New York, United States
- Inaugurated: 1978 (as Athenia Handicap)
- Race type: Thoroughbred – Flat racing
- Website: NYRA

Race information
- Distance: 1 1/8 miles
- Surface: Turf
- Track: Left-handed
- Qualification: Fillies & Mares, three-year-olds and older
- Weight: Base weights with allowances: 4-year-olds and up: 126 lbs. 3-year-olds: 122 lbs.
- Purse: US150,000 (2023)

The Athenia Stakes is a Listed American Thoroughbred horse race for fillies and mares age three-years-old and older run over at a distance of a mile and an eighth on the turf held annually in October at Belmont Park in Elmont, New York. The event offers a purse of US150,000.

== History ==
The Athenia Stakes is named in honor of Hal Price Headley's filly Athenia, who won in 1946 the Ladies Handicap over the distance of 1 1/2 miles as well as the Misty Isle Handicap and Artful Handicap at Washington Park Race Track in Chicago. Athenia also was the granddam of Sir Ivor, the 1968 Horse of the Year in the United Kingdom and Leading broodmare sire in Britain & Ireland in 1983.

The inaugural running of the event was on 13 September 1978 as The Athenia Handicap for three-year-old fillies at 1 1/4 miles in distance and was won by the Terpsichorist who was trained by the US Hall of Fame trainer Woody Stephens and ridden by Michael Venezia in a time of 2:03 1/5. The event continued to be restricted to three-year-old fillies until 1983.

In 1980 the event was classified as Grade III. In 2005 the event was moved to the main track due to the inclement weather and consequently was downgraded.

The race has been held at Aqueduct Racetrack several times with the last such running in 2004.

The event was raced in split divisions in 1982 and 2001.

The event has been contested at various distances over its history with the current distance of 1 1/8 miles being reinstated in 2021.

The event in 2022 was moved to Aqueduct Racetrack due to infield tunnel and redevelopment work at Belmont Park.

In 2023 the event was downgraded by the Thoroughbred Owners and Breeders Association to Listed status

== Records ==
Speed record:

- 1 1/16 miles: 1:39.94 – Pianist (2013)
- 1 1/8 miles: 1:47.11 – Rapid Selection (1997)
- 1 1/4 miles: 2:00.40 – Love Sign (1980), De La Rosa (1981)
- 1 3/8 miles: 2:13.20 – Capades (1989)

Margins:

- 20 lengths – Rose Crescent (1983)

Most wins:

- 2 – Babae (2001, 2002)

Most wins by an owner:

- 2 – Rokeby Stables (1983, 1988)
- 2 – Harbor View Farm (1994, 1995)
- 2 – Joseph Platt Jr. (2001, 2002)
- 2 – Juddmonte Farms (1991, 2021)

Most wins by a jockey:

- 6 – Jorge F. Chavez (1994, 1999, 2000, 2001, 2002, 2005)

Most wins by a trainer:

- 10 – Chad C. Brown (2013, 2016, 2017, 2018, 2020, 2021, 2022, 2023, 2024, 2025)

== Winners ==
Year	Winner	Age	Jockey	Trainer	Owner	Distance	Time	Purse	Grade	Ref
At Aqueduct – Athenia Stakes
2025	Whiskey Decision	4	Flavien Prat	Chad C. Brown	Frederick Hertrich III & John D. Fielding	1 1/8 miles	1:48.60	$150,000	Listed	
2024	Child of the Moon (FR)	4	Manuel Franco	Chad C. Brown	Madaket Stables, Michael Dubb, & Louis Lazzinnaro	1 1/8 miles	1:48.63	$150,000	Listed	
2023	Technical Analysis (IRE)	5	Jose L. Ortiz	Chad C. Brown	Klaravich Stables	1 1/8 miles	1:49.20	$150,000	Listed	
2022	Love And Thunder (IRE)	5	Jose L. Ortiz	Chad C. Brown	John D. Gunther & Tanya Gunther	1 1/8 miles	1:50.07	$169,750	III	
At Belmont Park
2021	Pocket Squares (GB)	4	Jose L. Ortiz	Chad C. Brown	Juddmonte Farms	1 1/8 miles	1:51.19	$194,000	III	
2020	Tapit Today	5	Jose L. Ortiz	Chad C. Brown	William H. Lawrence & Bradley Thoroughbreds	1 1/16 miles	1:42.56	$100,000	III	
2019	Xenobia (IRE)	5	John R. Velazquez	Jonathan Thomas	Augustin Stable	1 1/16 miles	1:41.21	$200,000	III	
2018	Rymska (FR)	4	Irad Ortiz Jr.	Chad C. Brown	Sheep Pond Partners, Alain Jathiere, Thomas Coleman & Elayne Stables	1 1/16 miles	1:41.59	$200,000	III	
2017	Off Limits (IRE)	5	Joel Rosario	Chad C. Brown	Martin S. Schwartz	1 1/16 miles	1:41.73	$200,000	III	
2016	Roca Rojo (IRE)	4	Javier Castellano	Chad C. Brown	Sheep Pond Partners, Newport Stables & Bradley Thoroughbreds	1 1/16 miles	1:43.20	$200,000	III	
2015	Stellar Path (FR)	4	Joel Rosario	Christophe Clement	Trevor C. Stewart	1 1/16 miles	1:43.41	$200,000	III	
2014	La Tia	5	Joel Rosario	Armando De La Cerda	Salvador Hernandez	1 1/16 miles	1:43.36	$200,000	III	
2013	Pianist	4	Jose L. Ortiz	Chad C. Brown	Hidden Brook Farm & Dan Zucker	1 1/16 miles	1:39.94	$200,000	III	
2012	La Cloche	5	Junior Alvarado	James J. Toner	Phillips Racing Partnership	1 1/16 miles	1:45.15	$150,000	III	
2011	Denomination	5	Joe Bravo	Christophe Clement	Ghislaine Head	1 1/16 miles	1:44.17	$100,000	III	
2010	Eye of Taurus	4	Eddie Castro	Kiaran P. McLaughlin	Harvey A. Clarke	1 1/16 miles	1:47.04	$100,000	III	
2009	Belle Allure (IRE)	4	Ramon A. Dominguez	Christophe Clement	Ronchalon Stable	1 1/16 miles	1:43.30	$106,500	III	
Athenia Handicap
2008	Sunshine for Life	4	Channing Hill	Richard E. Schosberg	Jane M. Schosberg	1 1/16 miles	1:41.55	$110,300	III	
2007	Criminologist	4	John R. Velazquez	Claude R. McGaughey III	Stuart S. Janney III & Phipps Stable	1 1/16 miles	1:45.09	$109,100	III	
2006	Pommes Frites	4	Jose A. Santos	William I. Mott	Haras Santa Maria de Araras	1 1/16 miles	1:42.95	$112,300	III	
2005	Asti (IRE)	4	Jorge F. Chavez	H. Allen Jerkens	H. Joseph Allen	1 1/16 miles	1:42.57	$111,300	Listed	Off turf
At Aqueduct
2004	Finery	4	Pablo Fragoso	William H. Turner Jr.	Althea D. Richards	1 1/16 miles	1:43.73	$115,700	III	
2003	Caught in the Rain	4	Richard Migliore	Guadalupe Preciado	Heiligbrodt Stable & Walter L. New	1 1/16 miles	1:47.00	$113,000	III	
2002	Babae (CHI)	6	Jorge F. Chavez	Frank A. Alexander	Joseph Platt Jr.	1 1/16 miles	1:44.90	$116,700	III	
At Belmont Park
2001	Verruma (BRZ)	5	John R. Velazquez	Angel A. Penna Jr.	Earle I. Mack & Jael Barros	1 1/16 miles	1:40.40	$137,875	III	Division 1
2001	Babae (CHI)	5	Jorge F. Chavez	Frank A. Alexander	Joseph Platt Jr.	1 1/16 miles	1:42.09	$137,875	III	Division 2
At Aqueduct
2000	Wild Heart Dancing	4	Jorge F. Chavez	Eugene F. Brajczewski Jr.	My Jo Lee Stable	1 1/16 miles	1:43.40	$112,500	III	
1999	Antoniette	4	Jorge F. Chavez	Joseph P. Schlich	Calumet Farm	1 1/16 miles	1:41.89	$111,400	III	
1998	Tampico	5	Joe Bravo	Barclay Tagg	Ronald G. Cullis	1 1/16 miles	1:42.90	$85,350	III	
At Belmont Park
1997	Rapid Selection	4	Joe Bravo	Linda L. Rice	Clyde D. Rice	1 1/8 miles	1:47.11	$109,900	III	
1996	Sixieme Sens	4	Jerry D. Bailey	Robert J. Frankel	Three Plus U Stable	1 mile	1:37.80	$111,100	III	
At Aqueduct
1995	Caress	4	Robbie Davis	H. Allen Jerkens	Harbor View Farm	1 1/8 miles	1:54.18	$113,900	III	Off turf
1994	Lady Affirmed	3	Jorge F. Chavez	H. Allen Jerkens	Harbor View Farm	1 1/8 miles	1:48.66	$87,076	III	
At Belmont Park
1993	Trampoli	4	Mike E. Smith	Christophe Clement	Paul de Moussac	1 3/8 miles	2:17.16	$90,000	III	
1992	Fairy Garden	4	Julie Krone	Roger L. Attfield	Michael J. Ryan	1 3/8 miles	2:13.62	$86,700	III	
1991	Flaming Torch (IRE)	4	Pat Valenzuela	Robert J. Frankel	Juddmonte Farms	1 3/8 miles	2:13.99	$93,000	III	
1990	Buy the Firm	4	Jerry D. Bailey	Jose A. Martin	Thomas Mara	1 3/8 miles	2:18.20	$87,750	III	Off turf
1989	Capades	3	Angel Cordero Jr.	Richard O'Connell	Poma Stable	1 3/8 miles	2:13.20	$90,800	III	
1988	High Browser	3	Pat Day	MacKenzie Miller	Rokeby Stables	1 3/8 miles	2:18.60	$96,300	III	
1987	Lead Kindly Light	4	Julio Molina Pezua	Angel A. Penna Jr.	Cynthia Phipps	1 3/8 miles	2:23.80	$94,800	III	
1986	Dawn's Curtsey	4	Eddie Maple	John M. Veitch	Darby Dan Farm	1 3/8 miles	2:16.00	$92,400	III	
1985	Videogenic	3	Jean Cruguet	Gasper S. Moschera	Albert Davis	1 3/8 miles	2:15.40	$101,700	III	
1984	Key Dancer	3	Angel Cordero Jr.	William J. Hirsch Jr.	Oxford Stable	1 3/8 miles	2:14.80	$94,500	III	
1983	Rose Crescent	3	Robbie Davis	MacKenzie Miller	Rokeby Stables	1 3/8 miles	2:22.00	$57,300	III	
At Aqueduct – for 3YO fillies
1982	Mintage (FR)	3	Jean-Luc Samyn	Philip G. Johnson	Meadowhill	1 3/8 miles	2:17.80	$54,650	III	Division 1
1982	Middle Stage	3	Jimmy J. Miranda	John P. Campo	Buckland Farm	1 3/8 miles	2:17.40	$54,650	III	Division 2
At Belmont Park – for 3YO fillies
1981	De La Rose	3	Eddie Maple	Woodford C. Stephens	Henryk de Kwiatkowski	1 1/4 miles	2:00.40	$85,200	III	
1980	Love Sign	3	Ruben Hernandez	Sidney J. Watters Jr.	Stephen C. Clark Jr.	1 1/4 miles	2:00.40	$84,150	III	
1979	Poppycock	3	Jorge Velasquez	Woodford C. Stephens	Claiborne Farm	1 1/4 miles	2:03.60	$87,450		Off turf
1978	Terpsichorist	3	Michael Venezia	Woodford C. Stephens	Hickory Tree Stable	1 1/4 miles	2:03.20	$55,500		

Legend:
Dirt Turf

== :See also ==
- List of American and Canadian Graded races
