= Willard C. Freeman =

American jockey

Personal information
- Born: February 23, 1929 Providence, Rhode Island
- Died: April 17, 2013 (aged 84) Saratoga Springs, New York
- Occupation: Jockey / Trainer

Horse racing career
- Sport: Horse racing
- Career wins: 1,043

Major racing wins
- Bougainvillea Handicap (1954, 1991); Narragansett Special (1959); Queens County Handicap (1963); Excelsior Handicap (1964); Polly Drummond Stakes (1964); Jim Dandy Stakes (1967); Kent Stakes (1967); Astoria Stakes (1968, 1977); Fashion Stakes (1968); Frizette Stakes (1968); Matron Stakes (1969); Acorn Stakes (1969); Alabama Stakes (1969); Cotillion Handicap (1969); Coaching Club American Oaks (1969); Ladies Handicap (1969); Mother Goose Stakes (1969); Beldame Stakes (1970); Diana Handicap (1970, 1971); Jockey Club Gold Cup (1970, 1971); Nassau Stakes (1970); Top Flight Handicap (1970, 1971); Hempstead Handicap (1971); Interborough Handicap (1972, 1980, 1981); Firenze Handicap (1973); Distaff Handicap (1975); Lamplighter Stakes (1976); Lexington Handicap (1976); Pennsylvania Futurity Stakes (1976); Leonard Richards Stakes (1977); Round Table Handicap (1977); Beaugay Handicap (1978); Fort Marcy Handicap (1978); Sword Dancer Handicap (1978); Arkansas Derby (1982); Evan Shipman Handicap (1982); Modesty Handicap (1982); Mount Vernon Stakes (1983); NYSS Fifth Avenue Stakes (1986); Rothmans International (1989); Kingston Stakes (1989); Niagara Handicap (1990); Ontario Derby (1991); Canadian Turf Handicap (1992); Washington, D.C. International Stakes (1993); New York Derby (1993); Dwyer Stakes (1995)

Significant horses
- Buckhar, Shuvee, Hodges Bay, Gala Performance, Cold Comfort, Show Off, Understudy, Net Ball

Willard Clark "Mike" Freeman (February 23, 1929 - April 17, 2013) was an American Thoroughbred horse racing steeplechase jockey and very successful trainer in flat racing. He is best remembered as the trainer of Anne Stone's Shuvee, a two-time National Champion, a Filly Triple Crown winner and a U.S. Racing Hall of Fame inductee.

Widely known by the nickname Mike, racing in North America he won a number of the top races including the Jockey Club Gold Cup in 1970 and 1971 with Shuvee which marked the first time a filly had ever won the race in its fifty-three year history. Among his other top wins, Freeman won the prestigious 1989 Rothmans International in 1989 and the Washington, D.C. International Stakes in 1993.

At the time of his death Willard Freeman and his wife Iris had for many years owned Chime Bell Farm in Aiken, South Carolina.
