= Mount Vernon Stakes =

- Class: Restricted stakes
- Location: Belmont Park; Elmont, New York, United States
- Inaugurated: 1979
- Race type: Thoroughbred – Flat racing
- Website: Belmont Park at the NYRA

Race information
- Distance: 1 mile (8 furlongs)
- Surface: Turf
- Track: Left-handed
- Qualification: Fillies & Mares, three-years-old & up, bred in New York State
- Weight: Assigned
- Purse: US$125,000

The Mount Vernon Stakes is an American Thoroughbred horse race held annually near the end of May at Belmont Park in Elmont, New York. Contested on turf at a distance of a mile (8 furlongs), it is restricted to Fillies and mares age three and older who were bred in the State of New York

The Mount Vernon Stakes is named for the city of Mount Vernon in Westchester County, New York. Since inception in 1979, the race has been contested at various distances:

- 1 mile : 2014–present
- 1 1/16 miles : 1979–1982, 1989–1996, 2008–2013
- 1 1/8 miles : 1997–2007
- 1 1/4 miles : 1983–1988

Due to course conditions, the race was switched to dirt in 1988, 1990 and 2003.

The Mount Vernon was run in two divisions in 1989, 1992, 2002, 2004, and 2005.

== Historical notes ==
Ángel Cordero Jr. won this race as a jockey three times (1980, 1982, 1989) and as a trainer in 1996.

== Records ==
Speed record:

- 1:32.87 – Invading Humor (2015) (at current distance of 8 furlongs)
- 1:40.00 – Her Favorite (1992) (at previous distance of 1 1/16 miles)

Most wins:

- 2 – Gitchee Goomie (2011, 2012)
- 2 – Fifty Five (2019, 2020)

Most wins by an owner:

- 4 – Michael Dubb (2013, 2017, 2018, 2023)

Most wins by a jockey:

- 4 – José A. Santos (1987, 1991, 2000, 2005)
- 4 – Javier Castellano (2006, 2017, 2019, 2020)

Most wins by a trainer:

- 5 – Chad Brown (2013, 2017, 2019, 2020, 2023)

== Winners ==
Year	Winner	Age	Jockey	Trainer	Owner	Time
2025	Spinning Colors	5	John R. Velazquez	Mark A. Hennig	Bourbon Lane Stables, HGS Thoroughbreds & Mark A. Hennig	1:43.27
2024	Sliver Skillet	4	Joel Rosario	Christophe Clement	Reeves Thoroughbred Racing, Tango Uniform Racing & Steven Rocco	1:37.55
2023	Marvelous Maude	5	Irad Ortiz Jr.	Chad Brown	Michael Dubb, The Elkstone Group and Michael J. Caruso	1:34.08
2022	Giacosa	5	Luis Saez	H. James Bond	Bond Racing Stable	1:34.05
2021	Robin Sparkles	4	José Ortiz	Bruce R. Brown	Michael Schrader	1:16.72
2020	Fifty Five	6	Javier Castellano	Chad Brown	Peter M. Brant	1:34.45
2019	Fifty Five	5	Javier Castellano	Chad Brown	Peter M. Brant	1:34.09
2018	Feeling Bossy	5	Irad Ortiz Jr.	Jason Servis	Michael Dubb	1:36.42
2017	Fourstar Crook	6	Javier Castellano	Chad Brown	Michael Dubb, Bethleham Stables LLC, & Aisquith	1:37.33
2016	The Tea Cups	6	Luis Saez	Jeremiah C. Englehart	Kendel D. Standlee	1:36.40
2015	Invading Humor	5	Rajiv Maragh	Bruce N. Levine	Bloodlines Racing Partnerships	1:32.87
2014	Mah Jong Maddnes	5	Taylor B. Rice	John Morrison	Very Un Stable	1:34.42
2013	Shakeira	5	Rajiv Maragh	Chad Brown	Michael Dubb & Bethlehem Stable	1:35.75
2012	Gitchee Goomie	5	Alan Garcia	Rick Violette	Patsy C Symons	1:38.64
2011	Gitchee Goomie	4	Alan Garcia	Rick Violette	Patsy C Symons	1:35.36
2010	Chestoria	6	David Cohen	William Badgett Jr.	E El R Stable	1:42.89
2009	I Lost My Choo	4	Jose Lezcano	Phil Serpe	Flying Zee Stable	1:42.52
2008	Them There Eyes	4	Jose Espinoza	Kathleen Feron	Akindale Farm	1:44.06
2007	Factual Contender	6	Eibar Coa	Barclay Tagg	Thomas Farone Jr.	1:48.66
2006	Sabellina	5	Javier Castellano	Joseph Aquilino	Jay A. Lieberman	1:48.00
2005	Lady Bi Bi	6	José A. Santos	John O. Hertler	Tri County Stables	1:49.12
2005	Kevin's Decision	5	Edgar Prado	Carlos F. Martin	Flying Zee Stable	1:49.06
2004	Big Tease	4	Richard Migliore	Gary C. Contessa	Maggi Moss	1:48.67
2004	Brandala	6	Jose Espinoza	Thomas M. Walsh	Sorin Stables	1:49.56
2003	Princess Dixie	4	Edgar Prado	H. James Bond	James F. Edwards	1:49.41
2002	Shopping for Love	5	Jerry Bailey	Kenneth Nesky	George D'Archangelo	1:46.80
2002	Eventail	5	Edgar Prado	Richard Schosberg	Gallagher's Stud	1:46.55
2001	Truebreadpudding	6	John Velazquez	Gary Sciacca	Coffee Pot Stables	1:48.05
2000	Office Miss	6	José A. Santos	Gary Sciacca	Sam F. Morrell	1:48.20
1999	Highland Strike	6	Jose Espinoza	Richard DeStasio	Wayne R. Ewald	1:47.20
1998	Dancewiththebride	3	Eibar Coa	Gary P. Gullo	Aaron Beecher	1:48.60
1997	Darlin Danika	5	Joe Bravo	Thomas M. Walsh	Dan-Dev Stable	1:48.60
1996	Rogues Walk	4	Jerry Bailey	Ángel Cordero Jr.	M.Dinmore et al.	1:42.40
1995	Tiffany's Taylor	6	John Velazquez	Leo O'Brien	Theresa Maher	1:40.40
1994	Irish Actress	7	Mike E. Smith	Leo O'Brien	Austin Delaney	1:40.80
1993	McKaymackenna	4	Jorge Velásquez	Rene Araya	R Kay Stable	1:40.60
1992	Her Favorite	4	Eddie Maple	Donna J. Freyer	Tanrackin Farm	1:40.00
1992	Talc's Coventry	4	Robbie Davis	Sarah A. Lundy	James F. Edwards	1:41.00
1991	Serene Nobility	5	José A. Santos	Henry S. White Jr.	Nauset Stable	1:41.20
1990	Banded	4	Jerry Bailey	Ramon M. Hernandez	Lucille Riccelli	1:43.40
1989	Capades	3	Ángel Cordero Jr.	Richard O'Connell	Poma Stable	1:42.70
1989	Stage View	4	Richard Migliore	Roger Laurin	Richard A. DeStasio	1:43.72
1988	Comorin Cape	3	Brian Peck	Leo O'Brien	Philip Dileo	2:06.20
1987	Lake Cecebe	4	José A. Santos	Kenneth Nesky	Bonnie Mike Stable	2:07.40
1986	Wendy Walker	4	Robert Thibeau Jr.	Sidney Watters Jr.	William C. MacMillen Jr.	2:01.80
1985	Wimborne Sky	5	Eddie Maple	Richard J. Lundy	Virginia Kraft Payson	2:04.20
1984	Miss Audimar	3	Jean-Luc Samyn	Philip G. Johnson	Hellson Stable	2:02.40
1983	Beech Island	5	Robbie Davis	Willard C. Freeman	Buckingham Farm	2:03.00
1982	Mademoiselle Ivor	4	Ángel Cordero Jr.	Larry Barrera	Lowell T. Hughes	1:43.00
1981	Move It Now	4	Ruben Hernandez	James W. Maloney	Snowberry Farm	1:46.40
1980	Adlibber	3	Ángel Cordero Jr.	Jan H. Nerud	Morton Fink	1:41.40
1979	Sweet Woodruff	4	Michael Venezia	Sidney Watters Jr.	William C. MacMillen Jr.	1:42.20
