= Gander Stakes =

- Class: Restricted
- Location: Aqueduct Racetrack; South Ozone Park, Queens, New York, United States
- Inaugurated: 2005
- Race type: Thoroughbred - Flat racing

Race information
- Distance: 1 mile (8 furlongs)
- Surface: Dirt
- Track: left-handed
- Qualification: Three-year-olds and up, New York-bred
- Weight: 124 pounds (56 kg) with allowances
- Purse: $100,000

The Gander Stakes is an ungraded stakes race for New York bred Thoroughbred race horses, three-years-old and older, run at Belmont Park or at Aqueduct Racetrack. The Gander serves as a prep for the Evan Shipman Handicap running at Belmont Park which is restricted to New York bred thoroughbred racehorses.

Inaugurated in 2005, and named for one of New York state's favorite home-breds and racing millionaires, Gander, the race is set at one mile and offers a purse of $100,000.

This race is not listed on either the official Aqueduct or Belmont sites as running from 2009 to 2015.

The Gander Stakes has been run at Aqueduct Racetrack since 2016.

The race was not run from 2008 to 2015.

== Records ==
Most wins by a jockey:

- 3 – Dylan Davis (2018, 2022, 2024)

Most wins by a trainer:

- 2 – Christophe Clement (2016, 2024)

Most wins by an owner:

- No owner has won this race more than once

== Past winners ==
Year	Winner	Jockey	Trainer	Owner	Distance	Time
2025	Soontobeking	Eric Cancel	George Weaver	Our Blue Streaks Stable, SGV Thoroughbreds & George Weaver	1 mile	1:41.26
2024	Pandagate	Dylan Davis	Christophe Clement	Madaket Stables, Aldelphi Racing Club, Corms Racing Stable & On The Rise Again Stable	1 mile	1:40.67
2023	Neural Network*	Manuel Franco	Chad C. Brown	Klaravich Stables	1 mile	1:38.64
2022	Barese	Dylan Davis	Michael J. Maker	Paradise Farms & David Staudacher	1 mile	1:39.26
2021	Nicky The Vest	Kendrick Carmouche	Jonathan Thomas	Robert LaPenta	1 mile	1:37.94
2020	Chowda	Eric Cancel	Gary Sciacca	Eddie F's Racing	1 mile	1:40.36
2019	Durkin's Call	Junior Alvarado	William I. Mott	Wachtel Stables, Peter Deutsch & Christopher T. Gunn	1 mile	1:37.90
2018	Nine Route	Dylan Davis	Jeremiah C. Englehart	August Dawn Farm	1 mile	1:41.25
2017	Haul Anchor	Cornelio Velásquez	Kiaran P. McLaughlin	Chester Broman Sr. & Mary Broman	1 mile	1:43.31
2016	Governor Malibu	Manuel Franco	Christophe Clement	Jump Sucker Stables & Oak Bluff Stables	1 mile	1:44.78
2007	Accountforthegold	Mike Luzzi	Gary C. Contessa	Harold Lerner & Winning Move Stables	1 mile	1:40.53
2005	Carminooch	John R. Velazquez	Todd A. Pletcher	Three Amigos Stables	1 mile	1:41.54

*The original winner Maker's Candy won the race but was disqualified due to interference.
