= John O. Hertler =

American Thoroughbred horse trainer (born 1950)

John Hertler
Personal information
- Born: September 17, 1950 (age 75) Ridgewood, New York, United States
- Occupation: Trainer

Horse racing career
- Sport: Horse racing
- Career wins: Not found

Major racing wins
- Evan Shipman Handicap (1984); Forego Handicap (1984); Jockey Club Gold Cup (1984); Marlboro Cup (1984); Whitney Handicap (1984); Woodward Stakes (1984); Hollywood Derby (1985); Hudson Stakes (NYB) (1985); Royal Heroine Stakes (1985); Molson Export Challenge (1988); Hill Prince Stakes (1989); Saranac Stakes (1989); La Prevoyante Handicap (1990); Ohio Derby (1991); Sport Page Handicap (1994); Sleepy Hollow Stakes (1996); Ashley T. Cole Handicap (1999, 2006); Hollie Hughes Handicap (1999, 2000, 2002); True North Handicap (1999); Fall Highweight Handicap (2000); Mount Vernon Handicap (2005); Union Avenue Stakes (2005); Yaddo Handicap (2007, 2008); Smart Coupons Stakes (2009); Ruthless Stakes (2010); Bay Ridge Stakes (2014); Biogio's Rose Stakes (2016)

Significant horses
- Ballindaggin, Slew o' Gold

John O. Hertler (born September 17, 1950, in Ridgewood, Queens) is an American Thoroughbred horse trainer.

He was fifteen years old when he began working for Hall of Fame trainer Phil Johnson with whom he remained for thirteen years. In 1978 he went out on his own, training horses he purchased as well as for others.

John Hertler trained Ballindaggin, who won the inaugural running of the Molson Export Challenge (Woodbine Mile) in 1988 and Slew the Dragon who won the 1988 Hollywood Derby. He has twice won the Ashley T. Cole Handicap in 1999 and 2006. However, he is best known as the trainer of the Eclipse Award winner and Hall of Fame colt, Slew o' Gold.
