= Seattle Song =

American-bred Thoroughbred racehorse

- Sire: Seattle Slew
- Grandsire: Bold Reasoning
- Dam: Incantation
- Damsire: Prince Blessed
- Sex: Stallion
- Foaled: 1981
- Country: United States
- Colour: Bay
- Breeder: Franklin N. Groves
- Owner: Stavros Niarchos
- Trainer: François Boutin
- Record: 9: 3-4-0
- Earnings: US$295,321

Major wins
- Prix de la Salamandre (1983); Washington, D.C. International Stakes (1984)

Seattle Song (February 19, 1981 – February 3, 1996) was a Kentucky-bred Thoroughbred racehorse who won the 1983 Prix de la Salamandre and 1984 Washington, D.C. International Stakes.

== Background ==
Bred in Kentucky, Seattle Song was sired by 1977 U.S. Triple Crown winner Seattle Slew. He was out of the mare Incantation, who was sired by Prince Blessed, winner of the 1961 Hollywood Gold Cup and American Handicap. He was selected by trainer François Boutin for Greek shipping magnate Stavros Niarchos who paid US$350,000 at the July 1982 Keeneland yearling sale.

== Racing career ==
After winning the 1983 Prix de la Salamandre and 1984 Baltimore Washington International Turf Cup, Seattle Song was scheduled to run in the inaugural Breeders' Cup Turf in 1984, but he fractured his left front cannon bone in a workout at Hollywood Park Racetrack and was retired from racing.

== Stud career ==
At stud in the United States, Seattle Song sired a number of stakes winners, the best of which was Group One (Prix Lupin) winner Cudas, who, like his sire, raced successfully in France and the United States, and Irish Linnet, a millionaire filly who won five consecutive editions of the Yaddo Handicap at Saratoga Race Course between 1991 and 1995.

Seattle Song died prematurely at age fifteen on February 3, 1996, as the result of paddock accident at Domino Stud in Lexington, Kentucky.

== Pedigree ==
Pedigree of Seattle Song
Sire Seattle Slew	Bold Reasoning	Boldnesian	Bold Ruler
Sire Seattle Slew	Bold Reasoning	Boldnesian	Alanesian
Sire Seattle Slew	Bold Reasoning	Reason To Earn	Hail To Reason
Sire Seattle Slew	Bold Reasoning	Reason To Earn	Sailing Home
Sire Seattle Slew	My Charmer	Poker	Round Table
Sire Seattle Slew	My Charmer	Poker	Glamour
Sire Seattle Slew	My Charmer	Fair Charmer	Jet Action
Sire Seattle Slew	My Charmer	Fair Charmer	Myrtle Charm
Dam Incantation	Prince Blessed	Princequillo	Prince Rose
Dam Incantation	Prince Blessed	Princequillo	Cosquilla
Dam Incantation	Prince Blessed	Dog Blessed	Bull Dog
Dam Incantation	Prince Blessed	Dog Blessed	Blessed Again
Dam Incantation	Magic Spell	Flushing	Mahmoud
Dam Incantation	Magic Spell	Flushing	Callandar
Dam Incantation	Magic Spell	Subterranean	By Jimminy
Dam Incantation	Magic Spell	Subterranean	U-Boat
