= Empire Classic Handicap =

The Empire Classic Handicap is a Thoroughbred horse race restricted to New York breeds run at Belmont Park in Elmont, New York. Set at a distance of one and one eighth miles on the dirt, this ungraded stakes race is open to three-year-olds and up, and currently offers a purse of $300,000.

Inaugurated in 1976 as the Empire Stakes, the Empire Classic (renamed in 1994) ran as a six furlong event for two-year-olds from 1976 to 1988 and from 1990 to 1993. It was run at Belmont Park from 1989 to 1991, from 1993 to 1995, and from 1997 to the present. Saratoga Race Course hosted the event in 1992 and Aqueduct Racetrack in 1996. When it was renamed in 1994, it also changed its distance to nine furlongs.

The Empire Classic is named after New York state's nickname, "The Empire State".

== Past winners ==
- 2021 – Americanrevolution (3) (Luis Saez)
- 2020 – Mr.Buff (6) (Junior Alvarado)
- 2019 – Mr.Buff (5) (Junior Alvarado)
- 2018 – Pat On The Back (4) (Dylan Davis)
- 2017 – Twisted Tom (3) (Javier Castellano)
- 2016 – Royal Posse (5) (Irad Ortiz Jr.)
- 2015 – Empire Dreams (4) (Manuel Franco)
- 2014 – Effinex (3) (Angel S. Arroyo)
- 2013 – Saratoga Snacks (4) (Joel Rosario)
- 2012 – Lunar Victory (5) (Junior Alvarado)
- 2011 – Haynesfield (5) (Ramon Domínguez)
- 2010 – Friend Or Foe (3) (Alex Solis)
- 2009 – Haynesfield (3) (Ramon Domínguez)
- 2008 – Stud Muffin (Alan Garcia)
- 2007 – Dr. V's Magic (3) (Kent Desormeaux)
- 2006 – Organizer (4) (Eibar Coa)
- 2005 – Spite the Devil (5) (Javier Castellano)
- 2004 – Spite the Devil (4) (Javier Castellano)
- 2003 – Well Fancied (5) (Edgar Prado)
- 2002 – Gander (6) (Richard Migliore)
- 2001 – Scottish Halo (4) (Harry Vega)
- 2000 – Turnofthecentury (3) (Aaron Gryder)
- 1999 – Gander (3) (Robbie Davis)
- 1998 – Mellow Roll (3) (Jerry Bailey)
- 1997 – Instant Friendship (4) (John Velazquez)
- 1996 – Victory Speech (3) (Mike E. Smith)
- 1995 – Sky Carr (5) (Jorge Chavez)
- 1994 – Itaka (4) (Mike E. Smith)
- 1993 – Gulliviegold (José A. Santos)
- 1992 – Carr Heaven (Jerry Bailey)
- 1991 – T.V. Heart Throb (John Grabowski)
- 1990 – Ambassador In Love (Ángel Cordero Jr.)
- 1989 – Seaport Mac (Jerry Bailey)
- 1988 – Scarlet Ibis (Jacinto Vásquez)
- 1987 – Fourstardave (Randy Romero)
- 1986 – Jazzing Around (José A.Santos)
- 1985 – B.C. Sal (Richard Migliore)
- 1984 – Bazooka Babe (Eddie Maple)
- 1983 – Restless Feet (Jerry Bailey)
- 1982 – Stewpy (Jeffrey Fell)
- 1981 – Salute Me Sir (Ángel Cordero Jr.)
- 1980 – Adirondack Holme (Jorge Velásquez)
- 1979 – Restrainor (Ruben Hernandez)
- 1978 – Promenade All (Bernie Gonzalez)
- 1977 – Tequillo Boogie (Pat Day)
- 1976 – Fratello Ed (George Martens)
