= New York Stallion Series =

The New York Stallion Series was created by the New York Thoroughbred Breeders', Inc. The races (once a day-long event but now spread out over various dates) are run at Aqueduct Racetrack and/or Belmont Park and feature the progeny of stallions standing in the state of New York.

== First race Thunder Rumble ==
New York Stallion Thunder Rumble Stakes is for Thoroughbred horses three-years-old and up. The Thunder Rumble is restricted to geldings and colts at a distance of seven furlongs on the dirt and offers a purse of $75,000.

=== Past winners ===
- 2010 – Driven by Success
- 2009 – Uncle T Seven
- 2008 – Mor Chances (Jose Lezcano)
- 2007 – Stunt Man (Javier Castellano) (Gold and Roses, Eibar Coa up, placed)

== Second race Great White Way ==
New York Stallion Great White Way Division (named for the famous theater district running along New York City's Broadway) is for two-year-old geldings and colts at a distance of six furlongs and offers a purse of $100,000.

The race was run at Belmont Park in 1985, 1986, 1987, and 1990.

=== Past winners ===
- 2010 – Eminent Tale (Ramon A. Dominguez)
- 2009 -
- 2008 – Lookin At Her (Cornelio Velásquez)
- 2007 – Spanky Fischbein (John Velazquez)
- 2006 – Baxter (Kent Desormeaux)
- 2005 – Classic Pack (Pablo Fragoso)
- 2004 – Accurate (Norberto Arroyo Jr.)
- 2003 – West Virginia (Jerry D. Bailey)
- 2002 – Grey Comet (José A. Santos)
- 2001 – White Ibis (Robbie Davis)
- 2000 – Crispy Jet (Jerry D. Bailey)
- 1999 – Entrepreneur (John Velazquez)
- 1998 – Shut Out Time (Joe Bravo)
- 1997 – Mellow Roll (Frank Lovato Jr.)
- 1996 – Say Florida Sandy (Richard Migliore)
- 1995 – Romantic Rogue (Robbie Davis)
- 1994 – Ave's Flag (John Velazquez)
- 1993 – Spartan Victory (José A. Santos)
- 1992 – Rush Chairman Bill (Randy Romero)
- 1991 – Jay Gee (Ángel Cordero Jr.)
- 1990 – All Smarts (Craig Perret)
- 1989 – Sir Richard Lewis (Ángel Cordero Jr.)
- 1988 – Scarlet Ibis (Jose Romero)
- 1987 – Ballindaggin (Jorge Velásquez)
- 1986 – Royal Value (Randy Romero)
- 1985 – Bullet Blade (Richard Migliore)

== Third race Perfect Arc ==
The New York Stallion Perfect Arc Division is restricted to fillies and mares three-years-old and up and run at a distance of one and one sixteenth mile on the turf for a purse of $75,000.

=== Past winners ===
- 2008 – Follow My Dream (Jose Lezcano)
- 2007 – Factual Contender (Eibar Coa)
- 2006 – Artistic Express(3) (Cornelio Velásquez)
- 2005 – Champagne Ending (3) (Pablo Fragoso)
- 2004 – Kevin's Decision (4) (Edgar Prado)
- 2003 – Ma Femme (5) (Julio Pezua)
- 2002 – Lovely Amanda (5) (John Velazquez)
- 2001 – Waku Up Kiss (3) (Edgar Prado)
- 2000 – Ruby Friday (3) (Norberto Arroyo Jr.)

== Fourth race Fifth Avenue ==
The New York Stallion Fifth Avenue Division is restricted to two year old filles, the Fifth Avenue is run at a distance of six furlongs and offers a purse of $100,000.

Fifth Avenue is a noted street in the New York City borough of Manhattan, dividing the borough's East and West sides. It was run at Belmont Park in 1985, 1986, 1987, and 1990.

=== Past winners ===
- 2008 – Sarah Accomplished (Jose Lezcano)
- 2007 – Canadian Ballet (Alan Garcia)
- 2006 – Laurentide Ice (Cornelio Velásquez)
- 2005 – Princess Sweet (Cornelio Velásquez)
- 2004 – Karakorum Splendor (Pablo Fragoso)
- 2003 – So Sweet a Cat (John Velazquez)
- 2002 – Beautiful America (José A. Santos)
- 2001 – Princess Dixie (Edgar Prado)
- 2000 – Bon Fearless (Mike Luzzi)
- 1999 – Dat You Miz Blue (Jerry D. Bailey)
- 1998 – Long Distance (Richard Migliore)
- 1997 – Dancewiththebride (Cornelio Velásquez)
- 1996 – Iamacarr (Mike Smith)
- 1995 – Thunder Achiever (Jerry D. Bailey)
- 1994 – Rogues Walk (John Velazquez)
- 1993 – Princess JV (Richard Migliore)
- 1992 – Etta (Julie Krone)
- 1991 – Queen of Triumph (Jorge F. Chavez)
- 1990 – Talc's Coventry (Jerry D. Bailey)
- 1989 – Just Cuz (Jerry D. Bailey)
- 1988 – Addy's Appeal (William Fox Jr.)
- 1987 – Mithrandir (Julio Pezua)
- 1986 – Lady Cave (Robbie Davis)
- 1985 – Romantic Girl (Nick Santagata)

== Fifth race Long Island ==
The Long Island Handicap is a race for Thoroughbred horses held each November at Aqueduct Racetrack. The race is for fillies and mares, age three and up, willing to race the one and one-half miles on the turf.

This race was down-graded from a Grade II event to a Grade III beginning in 2007, and carries a purse of $150,000.

=== Past winners ===
- 2008 – Criticisms
- 2007 – Dalvina (Cornelio Velásquez)
- 2006 – Safari Queen
- 2005 – Olaya
- 2004 – Eleusis
- 2003 – Spice Island
- 2002 – Uriah
- 2001 – Queue

== Sixth race Staten Island ==
The New York Stallion Series Staten Island Stakes is for fillies and mares three-years-old and up. The Staten Island is run at a distance of seven furlongs on the dirt and offers a purse of $75,000.

The race is named for the island that sits just below the island of Manhattan.

=== Past winners ===
- 2010 – Big Brownie
- 2009 – Mother Russia
- 2008 – Under Serviced (John Velazquez)
- 2007 – Tamberino (Eibar Coa)

== Seventh race Cormorant ==
The New York Stallion Series Cormorant Division is for three-year-olds and up at a distance of one and one sixteenth miles on the turf and offers a purse of $75,000.

=== Past winners ===
- 2009 – Ruffino (6)
- 2008 – Classic Park (5) (Cornelio Velásquez)
- 2007 – Red Zipper (4) (Eibar Coa)
- 2006 – Red Zipper(3) (Eibar Coa)
- 2005 – Retribution (3) (Cornelio Velásquez)
- 2004 – Pa Pa Da (3) (Jose Espinoza)
- 2003 – Quantum Merit (4) (Richard Migliore)
- 2002 – Haggs Castle (4) (Mike Luzzi)
- 2001 – Union One (4) (Richard Migliore)
- 2000 – Chasin’ Wimmin (5) (Jean-Luc Samyn)

== Eighth race Park Avenue ==
The New York York Stallion Series Park Avenue division (in its 18th year as of 2011) is for three-year-old fillies at a distance of 6 1/2 furlongs and offers a purse of $100,000.

=== Past winners ===
- 2011 – Lady on the Run (Mike Luzzi)
- 2010 – Franny Freud (Garrett Gomez)
- 2009 – Mother Russia (Ramon Domínguez)
- 2008 – Like a Rose (Michael Luzzi)
- 2007 – Mighty Eros (Norberto Arroyo Jr.)
- 2006 – No Reason (Channing Hill)
- 2005 – Pretty Suzi (Pablo Fragoso)
- 2004 – Ihaveadate (Shaun Bridgmohan)
- 2003 – Hanselina (Edgar Prado)
- 2002 – Liveitupnow (Norberto Arroyo Jr.)
- 2001 – Lady Katie (Edgar Prado)
- 2000 – Laken (Mike Luzzi)
- 1999 – Winloc's Glorious (Shaun Bridgmohan)
- 1998 – Jersey Girl (Richard Migliore)
- 1997 – Dewars Rocks (Jorge Chavez)
- 1996 – Double Dee's (Frank Alvarado)
- 1995 – Dancin Renee (Jose Velez)
- 1994 – Minetonightsfirst (Robbie Davis)

== Ninth race Times Square Division ==
The Times Square is run at 6 1/2 furlongs and restricted to three-year-old colts and geldings.

=== Past winners ===
- 2010 – General Maximus
- 2009 – Uncle T Steven (Ramon Domínguez)
- 2008 – Fort Drum (Eibar Coa)
- 2007 – Bustin Stones (Ramon Domínguez)
- 2006 – Prince of Peace (Fernando Jara)
- 2005 – Gold and Roses (Shaun Bridgmohan)
- 2004 – West Virginia (John Velazquez)
- 2003 – Grey Comet (Jerry Bailey)
- 2002 – Trial Prep (John Velazquez)
- 2001 – Tom's Thunder (John Velazquez)
- 2000 – Be Mine Tonight (John Velazquez)
- 1999 – Shut Out Time (Joe Bravo)
- 1998 – Sandpile (Jorge Chavez)
- 1997 – Saratoga Sunrise (Robbie Davis)
- 1996 – Instant Friendship (John Velazquez)
- 1995 – Ave's Flag (John Velazquez)
- 1994 – Gash (Robbie Davis)
