= Noble Damsel Stakes =

- Class: Listed
- Location: Belmont Park; Elmont, New York
- Inaugurated: 1985 (as Lexiable Stakes)
- Race type: Thoroughbred – Flat racing
- Website: NYRA

Race information
- Distance: 1 mile (8 furlongs)
- Surface: Turf
- Track: left-handed
- Qualification: Fillies & Mares, three-years-old and older
- Weight: Base weights with allowances: 4-year-olds and up: 126 lbs. 3-year-olds: 122 lbs.
- Purse: $150,000 (2025)

The Noble Damsel Stakes is a Listed American Thoroughbred horse race for fillies and mares age three-years-old and older run over a distance of one mile on the turf held annually in October at Belmont Park in Elmont, New York. The event offers a purse of $200,000.

== History ==
The event was inaugurated on 28 September 1985 as The Lexiable Stakes at one mile in distance over the dirt and was won by the Irish bred filly Alabama Nana who was trained by the US Hall of Fame trainer D. Wayne Lukas in a time of 1:35 1/5.

The following year the event was run in split divisions on the turf over a distance of 1 1/16 miles.

In 1988 the event was classified as Grade III.

In 1989 the event was renamed to the Noble Damsel Stakes in honor of Noble Damsel, who won the 1982 New York Handicap at Belmont Park.

In 1997 the distance of the event was shortened to one mile In 2010 the conditions of the event were changed from a handicap to a stakes race with base weights with allowances.

In 2025 the event was downgraded by the Thoroughbred Owners and Breeders Association to Listed status.

== Records ==
Speed record:

- 1 mile: 1:32.06 – Viadera (GB) (2020)
- 1 1/16 miles: 1:39.59 – Irish Linnet (1994)

Margins:

- 25 lengths – Gerrymander (2023)

Most wins:

- 2 – Irish Linnet (1994, 1995)

Most wins by a jockey:

- 6 – John R. Velazquez (1994, 1995, 1996, 1998, 2004, 2019)

Most wins by a trainer:

- 6 – Chad C. Brown (2016, 2017, 2018, 2019, 2020, 2023)

Most wins by an owner:

- 2 – Austin Delaney (1994, 1995)

== Winners ==
Year	Winner	Age	Jockey	Trainer	Owner	Distance	Time	Purse	Grade	Ref
At Aqueduct – Noble Damsel Stakes
2025	Aussie Girl (IRE)	5	Dylan Davis	William Walden	Woodford Thoroughbreds	1 mile	1:36.73	$150,000	Listed	
2024	Ocean Club	4	Ricardo Santana Jr.	Jack Sisterson	Glen Hill Farm	1 mile	1:34.71	$175,000	III	
2023	Gerrymander	4	José Ortiz	Chad C. Brown	Klaravich Stables	1 mile	1:36.46	$112,500	Listed	Off turf
2022	Evvie Jets	4	Eric Cancel	Mertkan Kantarmaci	Robert J. Amendola	1 mile	1:35.65	$145,500	III	
At Belmont Park
2021	Shifty She	5	Edwin Gonzalez	Saffie A. Joseph Jr.	Chris Pallas & Harvey E. Rothenberg	1 mile	1:33.24	$200,000	III	
2020	Viadera (GB)	4	Joel Rosario	Chad C. Brown	Juddmonte Farms	1 mile	1:32.06	$100,000	III	
2019	Significant Form	4	John R. Velazquez	Chad C. Brown	Stephanie Seymour Brant	1 mile	1:33.48	$200,000	III	
2018	Uni (GB)	4	Joel Rosario	Chad C. Brown	Michael Dubb, Head of Plains Partners, Roberta LaPenta & Bethlehem Stables	1 mile	1:36.11	$186,000	III	
2017	Off Limits (IRE)	5	Joel Rosario	Chad C. Brown	Martin S. Schwartz	1 mile	1:32.51	$196,000	III	
2016	Mrs McDougal	4	Irad Ortiz Jr.	Chad C. Brown	Mr. & Mrs. William K. Warren Jr.	1 mile	1:34.99	$200,000	III	
2015	Recepta	4	Elvis Trujillo	James J. Toner	Phillips Racing Partnership & Pam Gartin	1 mile	1:33.32	$200,000	III	
2014	Annecdote (GB)	4	Irad Ortiz Jr.	Christophe Clement	George Bolton & Peter Leidel	1 mile	1:35.09	$200,000	III	
2013	Peace Preserver	4	Irad Ortiz Jr.	Todd A. Pletcher	Alto Racing	1 mile	1:33.93	$200,000	III	
2012	Naples Bay	4	Jose Lezcano	Christophe Clement	Edward A. Cox Jr.	1 mile	1:33.96	$150,000	III	
2011	Unbridled Humor	4	Ramon A. Dominguez	H. Graham Motion	Live Oak Plantation	1 mile	1:34.09	$100,000	III	
2010	Strike the Bell	4	Ramon A. Dominguez	David G. Donk	Rising Star Stables	1 mile	1:34.58	$100,000	III	
Noble Damsel Handicap
2009	Rutherienne	5	Alan Garcia	Christophe Clement	Virginia Kraft Payson	1 mile	1:34.34	$107,000	III	
2008	Criminologist	5	Edgar S. Prado	Claude R. McGaughey III	Stuart S. Janney III & Phipps Stable	1 mile	1:37.91	$111,700	III	
2007	Dance Away Capote	5	Alan Garcia	Barclay Tagg	Robert S. Evans	1 mile	1:34.82	$113,500	III	
2006	Karen's Caper	4	Edgar S. Prado	Robert J. Frankel	Stonerside Stable	1 mile	1:34.91	$155,366	III	
2005	Bright Abundance	4	Richard Migliore	Christophe Clement	Jon & Sarah Kelly, Don & Joan Cimpl, Jim & Joan Wiltz	1 mile	1:33.93	$150,000	III	
2004	Ocean Drive	4	John R. Velazquez	Todd A. Pletcher	Bonnie & Sy Baskin	1 mile	1:34.71	$150,000	III	
2003	Wonder Again	4	Edgar S. Prado	James J. Toner	Joan G. & John W. Phillips	1 mile	1:33.07	$150,000	III	
2002	Tates Creek	4	Jerry D. Bailey	Robert J. Frankel	Juddmonte Farms	1 mile	1:32.79	$114,400	III	
2001	Tugger	4	Jerry D. Bailey	Todd A. Pletcher	Anstu Stables	1 mile	1:35.18	$113,800	III	Off turf
2000	Gino's Spirits (GB)	4	Edgar S. Prado	W. Elliott Walden	Thomas F. Van Meter II & Peter Bradley	1 mile	1:36.61	$111,200	III	
1999	Khumba Mela (IRE)	4	José A. Santos	Christophe Clement	Haras du Mezeray	1 mile	1:34.50	$112,900	III	
1998	Oh Nellie	4	John R. Velazquez	Todd A. Pletcher	Michael B. Tabor	1 mile	1:32.80	$84,000	III	
1997	Colcon	4	Jerry D. Bailey	William I. Mott	Andreas Putsch	1 mile	1:32.80	$115,600	III	
1996	Perfect Arc	4	John R. Velazquez	Angel A. Penna Jr.	Brazil Stables	1 1/16 miles	1:42.41	$93,600	III	
1995	Irish Linnet	7	John R. Velazquez	Leo O'Brien	Austin Delaney	1 1/16 miles	1:40.67	$93,408	III	
1994	Irish Linnet	6	John R. Velazquez	Leo O'Brien	Austin Delaney	1 1/16 miles	1:39.59	$84,650	III	
Noble Damsel Stakes
1993	McKaymackenna	4	Chris Antley	Rene A. Araya	R. Kay Stable	1 1/16 miles	1:43.74	$92,700	III	
1992	Miss Otis	5	Art Madrid Jr.	Gordon F. Rathbun	Mrs. Henry T. Rathbun	1 1/16 miles	1:43.64	$89,100	III	Off turf
1991	Highland Penny	6	Ángel Cordero Jr.	Susan H. Duncan	Ravenbrook Farm	1 1/16 miles	1:40.21	$84,750	III	
1990	Christiecat	3	Eddie Maple	Patrick J. Kelly	Fox Ridge Farm	1 1/16 miles	1:43.40	$90,150	III	
1989	Miss Unnameable	5	Raul I. Rojas	Wayne Widmer	Tatt Stable	1 1/16 miles	1:40.74	$91,800	III	
Lexiable Stakes
1988	Glowing Honor	3	Pat Day	MacKenzie Miller	Rokeby Stables	1 1/16 miles	1:42.00	$92,250	III	
1987	§ Fieldy (IRE)	4	Ángel Cordero Jr.	Thomas J. Skiffington	Fernwood Stable	1 1/16 miles	1:43.40	$57,500		
1986	Slew's Exceller	4	Jean-Luc Samyn	Thomas J. Skiffington	K. Meyers	1 1/16 miles	1:42.20	$54,100		Division 1
1986	Fama	3	Randy Romero	Angel Penna Sr.	Santa Cruz Ranch	1 1/16 miles	1:41.00	$54,300		Division 2
1985	Alabama Nana (IRE)	4	Pat Valenzuela	D. Wayne Lukas	Leonard Mathis	1 mile	1:35.20	$58,000		

Legend:
Dirt Turf
Notes:
§ Ran as an entry

== See also ==
- List of American and Canadian Graded races
