= Ashley T. Cole Handicap =

- Class: Restricted
- Location: Belmont Park; Elmont, New York, United States
- Inaugurated: 1976
- Race type: Thoroughbred – Flat racing
- Website: www.nyra.com/belmont

Race information
- Distance: 6 furlongs
- Surface: Turf
- Track: Left-handed
- Qualification: Three-year-olds & up bred in New York State
- Weight: Assigned
- Purse: $125,000

Ashley T. Cole Handicap is an American thoroughbred horse race run annually at Belmont Park in Elmont, New York. Run in mid September, the race is open to horses age three and older bred in the State of New York. Currently offering a purse of US$125,000, it is contested on turf at a distance of 1 1/8 miles. Prior to 1989, it was run on dirt. Due to weather conditions, the 2001 edition was raced on dirt.

The race is named for the late Ashley T. Cole, a chairman of the New York State Racing Commission who played a crucial role in the creation of the New York Racing Association.

Inaugurated in 1976 at Aqueduct Racetrack in Queens, New York, until 1983 it was restricted to two-year-old horses. Since 1992 the race has been hosted by Belmont Park.

== Records ==
Speed record: (at current distance of 1 1/8 miles)

- 1:46.95 – City Man (2022)

Most wins:

- 3 – Kharafa (2012, 2015, 2016)

Most wins by an owner:

- 3 – Lawrence A. Durocher Jr. (2013, 2015, 2016)

Most wins by a jockey:

- 3 – Jerry Bailey (1992, 1998, 2002)
- 3 – Junior Alvarado (2012, 2014, 2015)

Most wins by a trainer:

- 2 – Sarah A. Lundy (1990, 1991)
- 2 – Gary Sciacca (1986, 2000)
- 2 – John O. Hertler (1999, 2006)
- 2 – Brad H. Cox (2019, 2021)

== Winners ==
Year	Winner	Age	Jockey	Trainer	Owner	Dist.	Time
2025	Senbei	6	Manuel Franco	Miguel Clement	Reeves Thoroughbred Racing & Darlene Bilinski	6 F	1:07.47
2024	Hush of a Storm	5	Flavien Prat	Brad H. Cox	Sanford J. Goldfarb	1 1/8 M	1:51:03
2023	Spirit of Saint Louis	3	Manuel Franco	Chad C. Brown	Madaket Stables, Micheal Dubb & Richard Schermerhorn	1 1/8 M	1:48.29
2022	City Man	5	Trevor McCarthy	Christophe Clement	Reeves Thoroughbred Racing, Peter Searles & Patty Searles	1 1/8 M	1:46.95
2021	Tiergan	5	Luis Saez	Rudy Rodriguez	Michael Imperio, Rudy Rodriguez & Andrew Gurdon	1 1/8 M	1:51.15
2020	No Race						
2019	Dot Matrix	5	Luis Saez	Brad H. Cox	Ten Strike Racing	1 1/8 M	1:46.57
2018	Black Tide	6	Jose Lezcano	David Cannizzo	Ivery Sisters Racing	1 1/8 M	1:48.09
2017	Get Jets	4	John R. Velazquez	Anthony Dutrow	Team D Racing	1 1/8 M	1:47.74
2016	Kharafa	7	Antonio A. Gallardo	Timothy A. Hills	Lawrence A. Durocher Jr.	1 1/8 M	1.50.61
2015	Kharafa	6	Junior Alvarado	Timothy A. Hills	Lawrence A. Durocher Jr.	1 1/8 M	1.49.13
2014	Lubash	7	Junior Alvarado	Christophe Clement	Aliyu Ben J Stables	1 1/8 M	1:47.83
2013	Kharafa	4	Javier Castellano	Timothy A. Hills	Lawrence A. Durocher Jr.	1 1/8 M	1:49.21
2012	Lubash	5	Junior Alvarado	Christophe Clement	Aliyu Ben J Stables	1 1/8 M	1:53.27
2011	Compliance Officer	5	Alex Solis	Bruce Brown	La Marca Stable	1 1/8 M	1:51.50
2010	Uncle T Seven	4	Julien Leparoux	John C. Kimmel	Thomas Mina, MFRG Racing	1 1/8 M	1:49.90
2009	Banrock	6	Kent Desormeaux	Thomas M. Bush	Nyala Farm	1 1/8 M	1:51.01
2008	Banrock	5	Kent Desormeaux	Thomas M. Bush	Nyala Farm	1 1/8 M	1:52.89
2007	Dave	6	Alan Garcia	Barclay Tagg	Three Colleens Stables, et al.	1 1/8 M	1:48.90
2006	Retribution	4	Chantal Sutherland	John O. Hertler	Our Canterbury Stables	1 1/8 M	1:49.38
2005	Certifiably Crazy	5	Cornelio Velásquez	Richard Schosberg	Wachtel Stable et al.	1 1/8 M	1:48.60
2004	Provincetown	4	Tony Farina	Philip Serpe	Flying Zee Stable	1 1/8 M	1:46.43
2003	Quantum Merit	4	Richard Migliore	Del W. Carroll II	Very Un Stable	1 1/8 M	1:47.48
2002	I'm All Yours	5	Jerry Bailey	Todd Pletcher	Anstu Stable	1 1/8 M	1:49.13
2001	Brave One	4	Norberto Arroyo Jr.	Gary C. Contessa	I.O.U. Atonn Stable	1 1/8 M	1:48:89
2000	Currency Arbitrage	7	John Velazquez	Gary Sciacca	Earle I. Mack/Anstu Stables	1 1/8 M	1:50.82
1999	Chasin Wimmin	4	Jean-Luc Samyn	John O. Hertler	Seymour Cohn	1 M	1:34:80
1998	Draw Shot	5	Jerry Bailey	Angel J. Penna Jr.	Francis R. Santangelo	1 M	1:33.51
1997	Amarettitorun	5	John Velazquez	Leo O'Brien	Teresa M. Maher	1 M	1:33:20
1996	Identity	4	José A. Santos	Thomas J. Skiffington	Kenneth C. Avanzino	1 M	1:37.40
1995	Bit Of Puddin	4	Mike E. Smith	Howard M. Tesher	Edwin Wachtel/Gregory Hawkins	1 M	1:36.40
1994	Terrorist	3	Julie Krone	David G. Donk	Relieb Stable	1 M	1:36.60
1993	Preporant	4	Mike E. Smith	Bruce Johnstone	Milton Ritzenberg	1 1/16 M	1:49.20
1992	Forlibend	4	Jerry D. Bailey	Michael W. Dickinson	Adele W. Paxson	1 1/16 M	1:49.20
1991	Kate's Valentine	6	Herb McCauley	Sarah A. Lundy	James F. Edwards	1 1/16 M	1:50.20
1990	Kate's Valentine	5	Ángel Cordero Jr.	Sarah A. Lundy	James F. Edwards	1 1/16 M	1:50.20
1989	Waterzip	4	Jean Cruguet	Dominick A. Imperio	Irving Paparo	1 1/16 M	1:55.00
1988	Tinchen's Prince	5	Anthony Vega	Richard A. DeStasio	Alfred Fried Jr.	1 M	1:35.80
1987	G'Day Mate	4	Frank Lovato Jr.	Thomas M. Miles	Carolyn Chernick	1 M	1:36.60
1986	Fast Step	3	Robbie Davis	Gary Sciacca	Jack Shaw	1 M	1:35.60
1985	Elegant Life	5	Jorge Velásquez	Michael Brice	Irma Brice	1 M	1:35.00
1984	Mc Michael	5	Robbie Davis	Kenneth A. Nesky	Bonnie Mike Stable	1 M, 70 Y	1:41.00
1983	At The Threshold	2	Pat Day	Lynn K. Whiting	W. Cal Partee	1 1/8 M	1:52.20
1982	Mugatea	2	Mike Venezia	Frank LaBoccetta	Paul Hoffman	1 M	1:37.40
1981	Ask Muhammad	2	Jorge Velásquez	Laurie Silvera	Gordon F. Hall	7 F	1:25.60
1980	Expro's Boy	2	Chris McCarron	John P. Campo	Frank Geraci	7 F	1:23.60
1979	Screenland	2	Ramon I. Encinas	H. Allen Jerkens	Earle I. Mack	7 F	1:25.00
1978	Sir Ivor Again	2	Jeffrey Fell	LeRoy Jolley	Mrs. Tilyou C. Christopher	7 F	1:24.60
1977	Kathy's Chief	2	Jacinto Vásquez	Warren J. Pascuma	Jane Levien	6 F	1:11.20
1976	Fratello Ed	2	Ruben Hernandez	Ramon M. Hernandez	Assunta Louis Farm	6 F	1:11.20
