= Yaddo Stakes =

- Class: Restricted Stakes
- Location: Saratoga Race Course; Saratoga Springs, New York; United States
- Inaugurated: 1980
- Race type: Thoroughbred – Flat racing
- Website: www.nyra.com/index saratoga

Race information
- Distance: 1 1/16 miles (8 1/2 furlongs)
- Surface: Turf
- Track: Left-handed
- Qualification: Fillies & Mares, three-years-old & up bred in New York State
- Weight: Assigned
- Purse: US$150,000

The Yaddo Stakes is an American Thoroughbred horse race held annually during the third week of August at Saratoga Race Course in Saratoga Springs, New York. The mile-and-an-eighth race on turf is open to fillies and mares, age three and older that were bred in the state of New York.

The race was run at a distance of seven furlongs from 1980 to 1982. It was run in two divisions in 1990, 1991, 1992, 2003, and 2005. Run on dirt prior to 1989, due to the turf course conditions in 1990 and 2002 it was switched to dirt.

The race is named for a community near Saratoga Springs for artists, writers, and composers.

== Records ==
Speed record:

- 1:46.45 – Irish Linnet (1994) (9 furlongs)
- 1:40.12 – Bar of Gold (2017) (8 1/2 furlongs)

Most wins:

- 5 – Irish Linnet (1991, 1992, 1993, 1994, 1995)

Most wins by a jockey:

- 4 – Pat Day (1985, 2000, 2003, 2004)

Most wins by a trainer:

- 7 – Leo O'Brien (1991 (2), 1992, 1993, 1994, 1995, 1997)

Most wins by an owner:

- 6 – Austin Delaney (1991 (2), 1992, 1993, 1994, 1995)

== Winners ==
Year	Winner	Age	Jockey	Trainer	Owner	Time
2025	Awesome Czech	4	Ricardo Santana Jr.	Horacio De Paz	Barry K. Schwartz	1:41.41
2024	Moonage Daydream	4	José Ortiz	Jorge R. Abreu	Chris Larsen	1:42.71
2023	New Ginya	4	Dylan Davis	Christophe Clement	Robert S. Evans	1:43.06
2022	Make Mischief	4	Dylan Davis	Mark E. Casse	Gary Barber	1:37.63
2021	Giacosa	4	Luis Saez	H. James Bond	Bond Racing Stable	1:42.54
2020	Myhartbelongstodady	5	Jose Lezcano	Jorge R. Abreu	Lawrence Goichman	1:44.16
2019	Belle Of The Spa	5	Dylan Davis	Bruce R. Brown	Anthony P. McCarthy	1:43.75
2018	La Moneda	5	Junior Alvarado	Thomas Morley	Patricia L. Moseley	1:40.49
2017	Bar of Gold	5	Irad Ortiz, Jr.	John C. Kimmel	Chester & Mary Broman	1:40.12
2016	Fourstar Crook	4	Javier Castellano	Chad Brown	Bethlehem Stables, Michael Dubb & Gary Aisquith	1:43.56
2015	The Tea Cups	5	Luis Saez	Jeremiah C. Englehart	Kendel D. Standlee	1:42.92
2014	Dayatthespa	5	Javier Castellano	Chad Brown	Frankels/Laymon/Bradley Thoroughbreds	1:41.93
2013	Dayatthespa	4	Javier Castellano	Chad Brown	Laymon/Bradley Thoroughbreds/Kruid/Eaton	1:42.57
2012	Hessonite	4	Ramon Domínguez	David Donk	Punk/DiLeo	1:43.44
2011	Gitchee Goomie	4	Alan Garcia	Richard A. Violette Jr.	Patsy C. Symons	1:44.38
2010	Meriwether Jessica	5	Alan Garcia	Richard A. Violette Jr.	Patsy C. Symons	1:46.98
2009	Nehantic Kat	6	Rajiv Maragh	Barclay Tagg	Statehouse Stable	1:53.03
2008	Latitude Forty	5	Javier Castellano	John O. Hertler	Dee Zee Stable	1:55.16
2007	Latitude Forty	4	Kent Desormeaux	John O. Hertler	Dee Zee Stable	1:47.84
2006	Finlandia	4	Kent Desormeaux	Thomas M. Bush	Nyala Farm	1:48.70
2005	On the Bus	5	Edgar Prado	Dale L. Romans	Kenneth & Sarah Ramsey	1:48.19
2005	Kate Winslet	4	Richard Migliore	Richard A. Violette Jr.	Team Valor Stables LLC	1:49.10
2004	Sabellina	3	Pat Day	Joseph Aquilino	Lieberman, Scharfman	1:53.06
2003	Dynamic Lisa	4	Pat Day	Scott Schwartz	Herbert & Carol Schwartz	1:50.60
2003	Wake Up Kiss	5	Edgar Prado	H. James Bond	Rudlein Stable/William Clifton, Jr.	1:50.77
2002	Textbook Method	4	José A. Santos	Rene Araya	Paul P. Pompa, Jr.	1:51.42
2001	Ransom's Pride	3	Jorge F. Chavez	Ramon M. Hernandez	Chester Broman	1:48.36
2000	Truebreadpudding	5	Pat Day	Gary Sciacca	Windbound Farms	1:51.65
1999	Truebreadpudding	4	John Velazquez	Gary Sciacca	Windbound Farms	1:46.91
1998	Try N Sue	3	Jerry D. Bailey	Anthony M. Ferraro	Mark D. Ferraro	1:49.22
1997	Junior Pitchunia	4	Joe Bravo	Leo O'Brien	Richard M. Bomze	1:49.25
1996	Dinner Diamond	6	Mike E. Smith	Robert DeBonis	Fred Corrado	1:48.81
1995	Irish Linnet	7	John Velazquez	Leo O'Brien	Austin Delaney	1:47.50
1994	Irish Linnet	6	John Velazquez	Leo O'Brien	Austin Delaney	1:46.45
1993	Irish Linnet	5	José A. Santos	Leo O'Brien	Austin Delaney	1:47.05
1992	Irish Linnet	4	Mike E. Smith	Leo O'Brien	Austin Delaney	1:47.13
1992	Her Favorite	4	Eddie Maple	Donna J. Frey	Tanrackin Farm	1:47.43
1991	Irish Actress	4	Ángel Cordero Jr.	Leo O'Brien	Austin Delaney	1:49.57
1991	Irish Linnet	3	Mike E. Smith	Leo O'Brien	Austin Delaney	1:49.85
1990	Lady D'Accord	3	Craig Perret	Nick Zito	E. Paul Robsham	1:51.60
1990	Big Brown Eyes	3	Robert Thibeau, Jr.	Robert G. Dunham	Robert M. Lippman	1:52.60
1989	Sweet Blow Pop	5	Julie Krone	Lawrence W. Jennings	Dee Pee Stables	1:47.60
1988	Anniron	5	Robbie Davis	Robert P. Lake	W. Alec Martusewicz	1:49.60
1987	Mighty Wonder	4	Jerry D. Bailey	Thomas M. Waller	Tanrackin Farm	1:51.80
1986	Sweet Velocity	3	Jean-luc Samyn	Philip G. Johnson	Amherst Stable	1:52.40
1985	Tall Glass O'Water	3	Pat Day	Richard Violette Jr.	Alfred G. Vanderbilt II	1:51.20
1984	Nany	4	Jorge Velásquez	Richard R. Root	Harry T. Mangurian Jr.	1:49.20
1983	Subversive Chick	3	Antonio Graell	Michael Sedlacek	Badlands Stable	1:50.00
1982	Cassie's Birthday	5	Ruben Hernandez	Ramon M. Hernandez	Frances Griffin	1:23.40
1981	Czajka	3	Ruben Hernandez	Ramon M. Hernandez	Bellerose Farm	1:24.00
1980	Fast Holly	5	Jacinto Vásquez	Alan B. Marcus	Ges Stable	1:24.20
