= NYB =

NYB may refer to:

- Evan Shipman Handicap, a race restricted to New York bred Thoroughbred horses
- nyb, the ISO 639 code for Nyangbo, a variant of Nyangbo-Tafi language
