= Sarah A. Lundy =

American Thoroughbred horse trainer (born 1954)

Personal information
- Born: August 26, 1954 (age 71)
- Occupation: Trainer

Horse racing career
- Sport: Horse racing
- Career wins: 85

Major racing wins
- Albany Handicap (1989); Ashley T. Cole Handicap (1990, 1991); Kingston Handicap (1991); Mount Vernon Stakes (1992); Sam F. Davis Stakes (1993); Tampa Bay Derby (1993); Budweiser Breeders' Cup (1996)

Significant horses
- Celtic Arms, Kate's Valentine, Marco Bay, Minstrel Star

Sarah A. Lundy (born August 26, 1954) is an American Thoroughbred horse trainer. In 1984 she became the first female trainer to ever saddle a horse in the Belmont Stakes, third leg of the U.S. Triple Crown series.

From 690 career starts, Sarah Lundy won 85 races. Among her successes, in 1990/91 she won back-to-back runnings of the Ashley T. Cole Handicap at Aqueduct Racetrack in the New York City area where she also won the 1991 Kingston Handicap at Belmont Park. Training during the winter in Florida, she won the Sam F. Davis Stakes and the Tampa Bay Derby at Tampa Bay Downs in 1993.
