= Eclipse Award for Outstanding Jockey =

American thoroughbred horse racing award

The Eclipse Award for Outstanding Jockey is an American thoroughbred horse racing honor for jockeys first awarded in 1971. Part of the Eclipse Awards program, it is awarded annually. Panamanian jockey Laffit Pincay Jr. won the inaugural award in 1971 and was the first jockey to win consecutively (1973 and 1974). His subsequent wins in 1979 and 1985 brought his total wins to five, a number only surpassed by American jockey Jerry Bailey, who holds the record with seven. Bailey won his first three consecutively from 1995 to 1997, before winning another four consecutively from 2000 to 2003. His latter four consecutive wins are a record, only matched by Venezuelan jockey Javier Castellano's four wins from 2013 to 2016. The most recent winner, Irad Ortiz Jr. also has five wins, tied with Pincay Jr. for second all-time behind Bailey.

== Winners ==
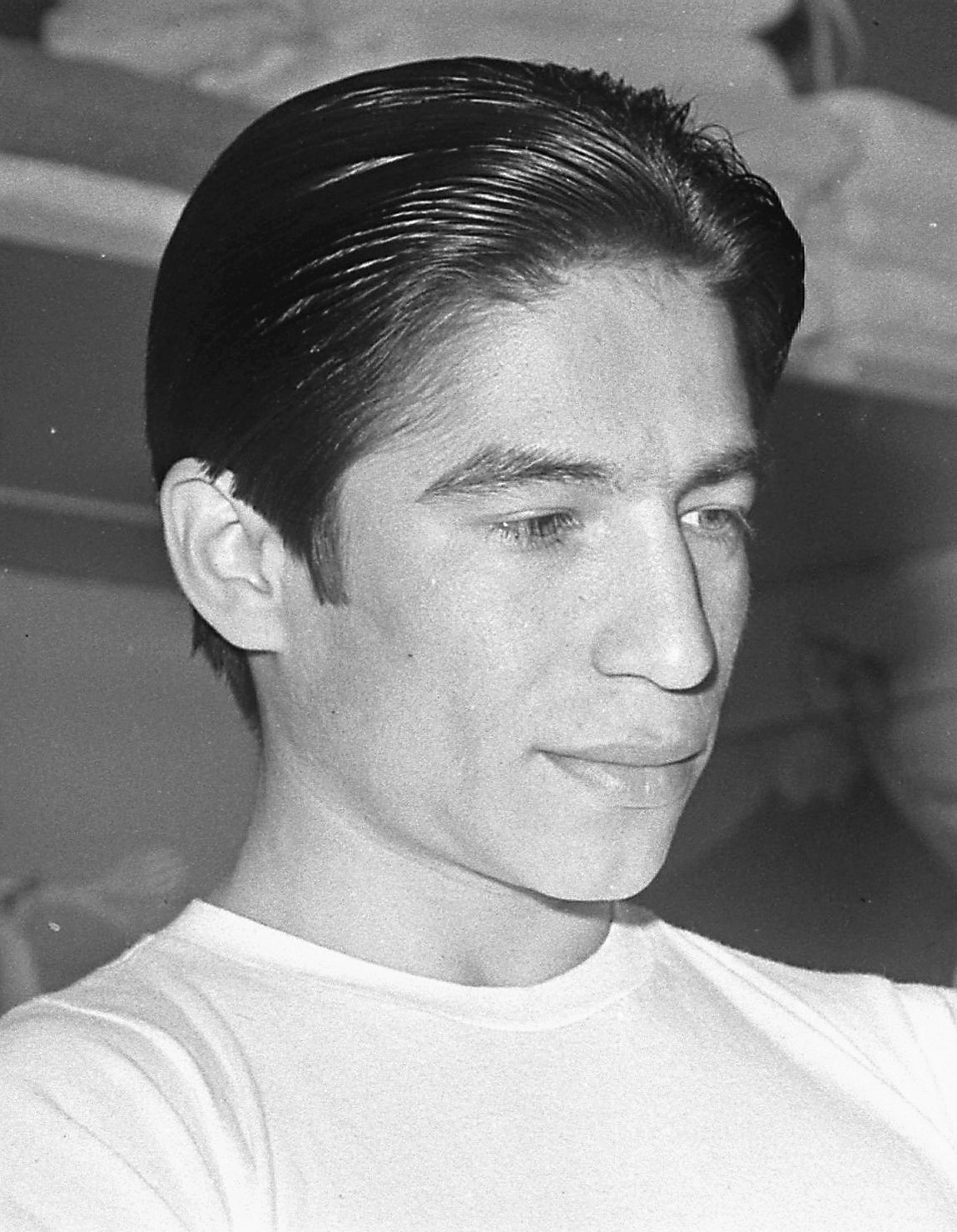
Laffit Pincay Jr., a 5× winner of the award, as well as the award's inaugural winner

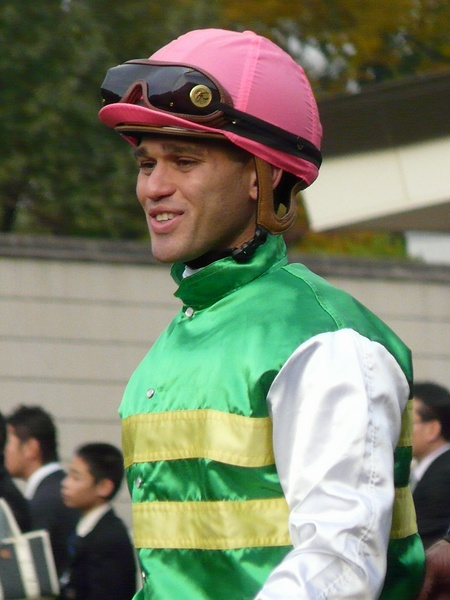
Javier Castellano won a record-four consecutive awards from 2013 to 2016

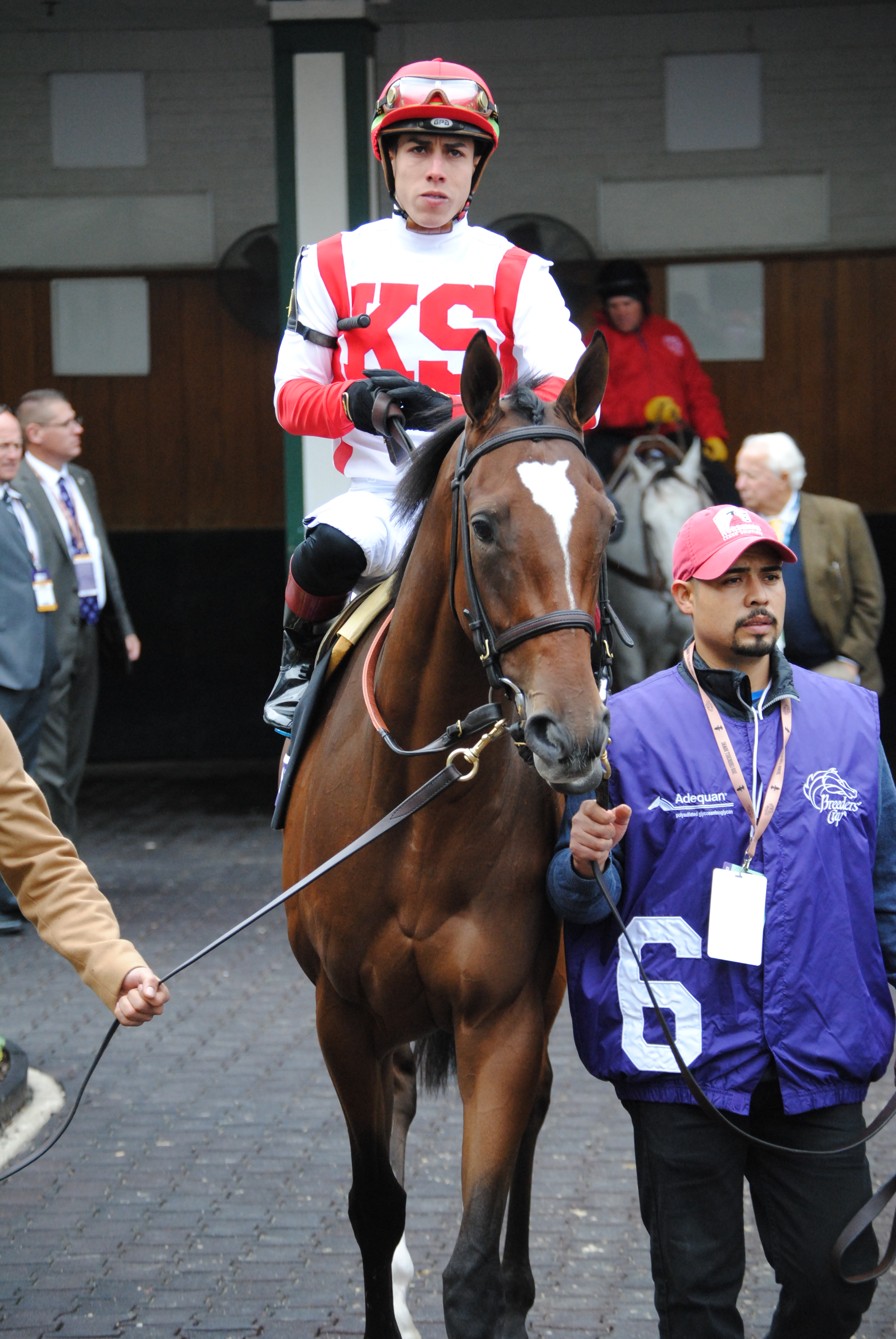
Irad Ortiz Jr., a 5× winner of the award and the most recent winner

*	Inducted into the National Museum of Racing and Hall of Fame

Year	Jockey	Nationality
1971	Laffit Pincay Jr.*	Panama
1972	Braulio Baeza*	Panama
1973	Laffit Pincay Jr.* (2)	Panama
1974	Laffit Pincay Jr.* (3)	Panama
1975	Braulio Baeza* (2)	Panama
1976	Sandy Hawley*	Canada
1977	Steve Cauthen*	United States
1978	Darrel McHargue*	United States
1979	Laffit Pincay Jr.* (4)	Panama
1980	Chris McCarron*	United States
1981	Bill Shoemaker*	United States
1982	Ángel Cordero Jr.*	Puerto Rico
1983	Ángel Cordero Jr.* (2)	Puerto Rico
1984	Pat Day*	United States
1985	Laffit Pincay Jr.* (5)	Panama
1986	Pat Day* (2)	United States
1987	Pat Day* (3)	United States
1988	José A. Santos*	Chile
1989	Kent Desormeaux*	United States
1990	Craig Perret*	United States
1991	Pat Day* (4)	United States
1992	Kent Desormeaux* (2)	United States
1993	Mike E. Smith*	United States
1994	Mike E. Smith* (2)	United States
1995	Jerry Bailey*	United States
1996	Jerry Bailey* (2)	United States
1997	Jerry Bailey* (3)	United States
1998	Gary Stevens*	United States
1999	Jorge F. Chavez	Peru
2000	Jerry Bailey* (4)	United States
2001	Jerry Bailey* (5)	United States
2002	Jerry Bailey* (6)	United States
2003	Jerry Bailey* (7)	United States
2004	John R. Velazquez*	Puerto Rico
2005	John R. Velazquez* (2)	Puerto Rico
2006	Edgar Prado*	Peru
2007	Garrett K. Gomez*	United States
2008	Garrett K. Gomez* (2)	United States
2009	Julien Leparoux^	France
2010	Ramon Domínguez*	Venezuela
2011	Ramon Domínguez* (2)	Venezuela
2012	Ramon Domínguez* (3)	Venezuela
2013	Javier Castellano*	Venezuela
2014	Javier Castellano* (2)	Venezuela
2015	Javier Castellano* (3)	Venezuela
2016	Javier Castellano* (4)	Venezuela
2017	José Ortiz*	Puerto Rico
2018	Irad Ortiz Jr.*	Puerto Rico
2019	Irad Ortiz Jr.* (2)	Puerto Rico
2020	Irad Ortiz Jr.* (3)	Puerto Rico
2021	Joel Rosario*	Dominican Republic
2022	Irad Ortiz Jr.* (4)	Puerto Rico
2023	Irad Ortiz Jr.* (5)	Puerto Rico
2024	Flavien Prat	France
2025	Flavien Prat (2)	France

== Records ==
Most wins:

- 7 - Jerry Bailey (1995, 1996, 1997, 2000, 2001, 2002, 2003)
- 5 - Laffit Pincay, Jr. (1971, 1973, 1974, 1979, 1985)
- 5 - Irad Ortiz Jr. (2018, 2019, 2020, 2022, 2023)
- 4 - Pat Day (1984, 1986, 1987, 1991)
- 4 - Javier Castellano (2013, 2014, 2015, 2016)

== See also ==
- Sovereign Award for Outstanding Jockey
- British flat racing Champion Jockey
