= Ballindaggin (horse) =

American-bred Thoroughbred racehorse

- Sire: Noble Nashua
- Grandsire: Nashua
- Dam: Can't Be Bothered
- Damsire: Stop The Music
- Sex: Stallion
- Foaled: 1985
- Country: United States
- Colour: Chestnut
- Breeder: Eaton & Thorne, Inc.
- Owner: George Layman, Jr.
- Trainer: John O. Hertler
- Record: 14: 4-2-3
- Earnings: $946,894

Major wins
- New York Stallion Series (1987); Molson Export Challenge (1988)

Ballindaggin (March 27, 1985 – July 22, 2008) was an American Thoroughbred racehorse best known for having defeated Fourstardave and Regal Classic.

== Background ==
Bred in New York, Ballindaggin was sired by Noble Nashua, a multiple stakes winner whose victories included the Grade I Marlboro Cup. Noble Nashua was a son of the 1955 United States Horse of the Year and National Museum of Racing and Hall of Fame inductee, Nashua. Out of the unraced mare Can't Be Bothered, his damsire was the good runner and successful stallion, Stop The Music.

He was named for the small village of Ballindaggin in County Wexford, Ireland.

== Racing career ==
Ballindaggin was raced by George Layman, Jr. of Naches, Washington. He was one of three partners who purchased half of the breeding rights to Seattle Slew. Trained by John Hertler, in 1987 the two-year-old colt swept all three races in the New York Stallion Series, defeating Fourstardave in each race.

Racing at age three, Ballindaggin was winless in his first seven starts but in September earned the most important win of his career at Woodbine Racetrack in Toronto, Ontario, Canada when he defeated Regal Classic and others to win the $1 million Molson Export Challenge.

Ballindaggin finished third in the 1988 Pennsylvania Derby, behind winner Cefis. He also finished third in the Gr.III Longacres Derby and Albany Stakes, and finished second in the Mike Lee Handicap and Damon Runyon Stakes.

== Retirement ==
Retired to stud duty due to injury, Ballindaggin stood at several breeding farms including at Jerre Paxton's Yakima Stallion Station in Yakima, Washington. He met with little success as a sire and in July 2006 was donated to Old Friends Equine, a retirement and rescue facility for pensioned Thoroughbreds in Georgetown, Kentucky. Ballindaggin was euthanized on July 22, 2008 at Hagyard Equine Medical Institute near Lexington as a result of severe back problems brought on by degenerative arthritis.

Ballindaggin's most notable runner is colt Birthday Pretense, who won multiple stakes races.

Ballindaggin was buried in Old Friends's Dream Chase Cemetery.

== Pedigree ==
Pedigree of Ballindaggin
Sire Noble Nashua	Nashua	Nasrullah	Nearco
Sire Noble Nashua	Nashua	Nasrullah	Mumtaz Begum
Sire Noble Nashua	Nashua	Segula	Johnstown
Sire Noble Nashua	Nashua	Segula	Sekhmet
Sire Noble Nashua	Noble Lady	Vaguely Noble	Vienna
Sire Noble Nashua	Noble Lady	Vaguely Noble	Noble Lassie
Sire Noble Nashua	Noble Lady	Good Folks	Citation
Sire Noble Nashua	Noble Lady	Good Folks	Mother In Law
Dam Can't Be Bothered	Stop The Music	Hail To Reason	Turn-To
Dam Can't Be Bothered	Stop The Music	Hail To Reason	Nothirdchance
Dam Can't Be Bothered	Stop The Music	Bebopper	Tom Fool
Dam Can't Be Bothered	Stop The Music	Bebopper	Bebop
Dam Can't Be Bothered	Evasive	Buckpasser	Tom Fool
Dam Can't Be Bothered	Evasive	Buckpasser	Busanda
Dam Can't Be Bothered	Evasive	Summer Scandal	Summer Tan
Dam Can't Be Bothered	Evasive	Summer Scandal	Go-Modern
