= Gander (horse) =

American-bred Thoroughbred racehorse

- Sire: Cormorant
- Grandsire: His Majesty
- Dam: Lovely Nurse
- Damsire: Sawbones
- Sex: Gelding
- Foaled: 1996
- Country: United States
- Colour: Gray
- Breeder: Angela Rugnetta
- Owner: Gatsas Thoroughbreds
- Trainer: Charlie Assimakopoulos; John Terranova
- Record: 60: 15-10-9
- Earnings: $1,824,011

Major wins
- Albany Stakes (1999); Empire Classic Handicap (1999, 2002); Evan Shipman Handicap (2000); Meadowlands Cup Handicap (2001); Kings Point Handicap (2004)

Awards
- Champion New York Three-Year-Old (1999); New York Horse of the Year (2000); Champion New York Older Horse (2000)

Honours
- The Gander Stakes at Aqueduct Racetrack run in his honor.
- Last updated on November 23, 2007

Gander (May 15, 1996 - December 7, 2022) was a thoroughbred race horse by Cormorant (who won eight of his twelve starts) out of Lovely Nurse (a hard-knocker who made one hundred and one starts) by Sawbones. His pedigree includes the top British horse Ribot, as well as Tom Fool, Count Fleet, Bimelech, Eight Thirty, Noor, and Hyperion.

Gander is New York-bred and spent almost his entire racing career of 60 starts in and around New York and New England. Bred by Angela Rugnetta, and owned by Gatsas Thoroughbreds, Gander was originally trained by Charlie Assimakopoulos, and then by John Terranova. In seven seasons, he made 60 starts and won fifteen times, placed ten times, and came in third nine times, earning $1,824,011.

As a two-year-old he placed in the Damon Runyon Stakes at Aqueduct Race Track.

At three, he won the Albany Stakes at the Saratoga Race Course and the Empire Classic Handicap at Belmont Park. He also placed in the Paterson Stakes and came third in the Sam F. Davis Stakes.

At four, he won the Evan Shipman Handicap at Belmont, and came home second in the Grade 1 Jockey Club Gold Cup to Albert the Great. He was third to Lemon Drop Kid in the Grade I Woodward Stakes. He was also third in the Grade II Saratoga Breeders' Cup Handicap. Gander, with John Velazquez aboard, also started in the 2000 $4 million Breeders' Cup Classic in a field that included Albert the Great, Captain Steve, Cat Thief, Fusaichi Pegasus, Giant's Causeway, Lemon Drop Kid, and Tiznow. He came in ninth.

Racing at the age of five, he won the Grade II Meadowlands Cup Handicap, placed in the Grade III New Hampshire Sweepstakes Handicap, and came third in the Grade I Donn Handicap to Captain Steve, and the Grade I Whitney Handicap to Lido Palace.

At the age of six, with Richard Migliore up, he won the Empire classic for the second time, placed in the Woodward Stakes to Lido Palace, and placed in the Kings Point Handicap to Toddler. In the 2002 Saratoga Breeders' Cup Handicap, Gander stumbled coming out of the gate and lost his jockey, Mike Smith. He ran around the track riderless and crossed the wire but was disqualified, with Evening Attire the official winner of the race.

Seven in 2003, Gander came home second in the Empire Classic and third in the Grade III Stuyvesant Handicap.

At eight, he took the Kings Point Handicap.

In 1999, Gander was the Champion New York Three-Year-old. In 2000, he was the New York Horse of the Year and the Champion New York Older Horse. As a four-year-old in 2000, he was 3-1-2 from 11 starts with earnings of $388,290.

Gander then lived at Stone Bridge Farm in Schuylerville, New York. He died peacefully in his sleep due to the infirmities of old age on December 7, 2022.
