= Mike Venezia Memorial Award =

Mike Venezia Memorial Award is an American Thoroughbred horse racing honor given annually by the New York Racing Association to honor a jockey who exemplifies extraordinary sportsmanship and citizenship. The award was created in 1989 to honor the memory of jockey Mike Venezia, who was killed in a racing accident in October, 1988 at Belmont Park.

The award is determined by voting from jockeys, turf writers and racing fans. The winner is announced in July of each year and at a ceremony held in the fall, each recipient receives a 13-inch bronze sculpture with a title that reads, "The Jockey, A Champion."

== Recipients ==
- 1989 : Mike Venezia (posthumously)
- 1990 : Bill Shoemaker
- 1991 : Chris McCarron
- 1992 : Ángel Cordero Jr.
- 1993 : Jerry Bailey
- 1994 : Mike E. Smith
- 1995 : Pat Day
- 1996 : Laffit Pincay Jr.
- 1997 : Robbie Davis
- 1998 : Eddie Maple
- 1999 : Gary Stevens
- 2000 : Jorge F. Chavez
- 2001 : Mike Luzzi
- 2002 : Dean Kutz
- 2003 : Richard Migliore
- 2004 : Patti Cooksey
- 2005 : No award given
- 2006 : Edgar Prado
- 2007–2012 : No award given
- 2013 : Ramon Domínguez
- 2014 : John Velazquez
- 2015 : Jon Court
- 2016 : Mario Pino
- 2017 : Kendrick Carmouche
- 2018 : Joe Bravo
- 2019 : Javier Castellano
- 2021: DeShawn Parker
- 2022: Julien Leparoux
- 2023: Junior Alvarado
- 2024: Brian Hernandez, Jr.
