= Hollie Hughes Stakes =

- Class: Restricted stakes
- Location: Aqueduct Racetrack; Queens, New York, United States
- Inaugurated: 1979
- Race type: Thoroughbred – Flat racing
- Website: www.nyra.com/index_aqueduct.html

Race information
- Distance: 6 furlongs
- Surface: Dirt
- Track: left-handed
- Qualification: New York State bred, age four & older
- Weight: Assigned
- Purse: $100,000

The Hollie Hughes Stakes is an American Thoroughbred horse race run annually since 1979 at Aqueduct Racetrack in Ozone Park, Queens, New York. A six furlong sprint raced on dirt, it is open to horses bred in the State of New York age four and older. Run in mid February, then in mid January, now returned to the month of February, the race currently offers a purse of $100,000.

The race is named in honor of New York native Hollie Hughes, a U.S. Racing Hall of Fame inductee who trained horses from a New York base for 70 years.

== Records ==
Speed record:

- 1:08.60 – Stalwart Member (1997)

Most wins:

- 3 – Papua (2003, 2004, 2005)

Most wins by a jockey:

- 3 – Junior Alvarado (2011, 2013, 2016)
- 3 – Ángel Cordero Jr. (1981, 1983, 1989)
- 3 – Richard Migliore (1994, 2003, 2005)

Most wins by a trainer:

- 6 – Michael E. Hushion (1998, 2003, 2004, 2005, 2010, 2015)

Most wins by an owner:

- 6 – Barry K. Schwartz (1998, 2003, 2004, 2005, 2015, 2020)

== Winners ==
Year	Winner	Age	Jockey	Trainer	Owner	Dist. (Miles)	Time	Win$
2022	Wudda U Think Now	5	Trevor McCarthy	Rudy R. Rodriguez	The Elkstone Group	6 F	1:11.17	$100,000
2021	My Boy Tate	7	Manuel Franco	Michelle Nevin	Little Red Feather Racing & Michelle Nevin	6 F	1:10.85	$100,000
2020	Amundson	4	Jorge A. Vargas Jr.	Horacio DePaz	Barry K. Schwartz	6 F	1:10.87	$57,750
2019	Bavaro	5	Dylan Davis	Linda L. Rice	All In The Family Racing	6 F	1:11.78	$55,000
2018	My Boy Tate	4	Dylan Davis	Michelle Nevin	Little Red Feather Racing/Michelle Nevin	6 F	1:10.23	$60,000
2017	Candid Desire	5	Antonio Gallardo	Gary J. Sciacca	Amanda Laderer/Gary Downey	6 F	1:10.19	$60,000
2016	Drama King	4	Junior Alvarado	Rudy R. Rodriguez	Bethlehem Stables et al.	6 F	1:10.89	$60,000
2015	Captain Serious	4	Jose L. Ortiz	Michael E. Hushion	Barry K. Schwartz	6 F	1:10.70	$60,000
2014	Be Bullish	9	Taylor B. Rice	Richard E. Dutrow Jr.	Repole Stable	6 F	1:12.05	$60,000
2013	Saginaw	7	Junior Alvarado	David Jacobson	Drawing Away Stable/Jacobson	6 F	1:10.51	$45,000
2012	Law Enforcement	7	Alan Garcia	Mark A. Hennig	Camelia J. Casby	6 F	1:10.95	$45,000
2011	Be Bullish	6	Junior Alvarado	Richard E. Dutrow Jr.	Sullivan Lane Stable/R. E. Dutrow Jr.	6 F	1:11.62	$39,000
2010	Rereadthefootnotes	4	Ramon A. Dominguez	Michael E. Hushion	West Point Thoroughbreds	6 F	1:09.93	$39,000
2009	Mor Chances	5	Richard Migliore	Richard E. Dutrow Jr.	Vincent Scuderi & Sullivan Lane Stable	6 F	1:09.72	$42,120
2008	Gold and Roses	6	Rajiv Maragh	Thomas M. Bush	Henry C. Gregory	6 F	1:10.82	$48,795
2007	Introspect	7	Eddie Martin Jr.	Billy Turner	Castle Village Farm	6 F	1:11.64	$43,555
2006	Big Apple Daddy	4	Orlando Mojica	Bruce N. Levine	Ervin Rodriguez	6 F	1:11.49	$42,510
2005	Papua	6	Richard Migliore	Michael E. Hushion	Barry K. Schwartz	6 F	1:09.60	$48,585
2004	Papua	5	Michael Luzzi	Michael E. Hushion	Barry K. Schwartz	6 F	1:10.40	$49,005
2003	Papua	4	Richard Migliore	Michael E. Hushion	Barry K. Schwartz	6 F	1:10.60	$48,435
2002	Vodka	5	Heberto Castillo Jr.	John O. Hertler	Joseph W. Gerrity Jr.	6 F	1:11.10	$48,075
2001	Say Florida Sandy	7	Joe Bravo	Juan Serey	John Rotella	6 F	1:09.40	$47,790
2000	Kashatreya	6	Octavio Vergara	John O. Hertler	Seymour Cohn	6 F	1:09.40	$49,845
1999	Kashatreya	5	Julio Pezua	John O. Hertler	Seymour Cohn	6 F	1:10.20	$32,040
1998	Thepromonroe	6	Chuck C. Lopez	Michael E. Hushion	Barry K. Schwartz	6 F	1:10.00	$33,240
1997	Stalwart Member	4	Herb McCauley	Howard Tesher	Edwin Watchel	6 F	1:08.60	$33,420
1996	Crafty Alfel	8	Frank Alvarado	Charles Carlesimo	James Fabricature	6 F	1:09.80	$33,000
1995	Crafty Alfel	7	Julio Pezua	Charles Carlesimo	James Fabricature	6 F	1:11.20	$31,890
1994	Fabersham	6	Richard Migliore	Gasper Moschera	Barbara J. Davis	6 F	1:12.00	$32,430
1993	Detox	4	Mike E. Smith	Michael W. Downing	Charles J. Murphy Jr.	6 F	1:10.40	$40,740
1992	Argyle Lake	6	Dennis Carr	Peter Ferriola	James Riccio	6 F	1:11.00	$54,180
1991	Argyle Lake	5	Herb McCauley	Peter Ferriola	James Riccio	6 F	1:10.60	$53,460
1990	Appealing Guy	4	Jacinto Vásquez	Gary Sciacca	Vincent McGuire	6 F	1:08.80	$52,380
1989	Notebook	4	Ángel Cordero Jr.	D. Wayne Lukas	Eugene V. Klein	6 F	1:10.80	$51,570
1988	Summer Tale	5	Nick Santagata	Peter Ferriola	Gold'N'Oats Stable	6 F	1:11.20	$50,400
1987	Landing Plot	4	José A. Santos	Arthur Wendel	Triad Stable	6 F	1:11.00	$41,820
1986	Hamlet	6	Robbie Davis	Peter Ferriola	Vee-Pee-Jay Stable	6 F	1:10.80	$42,420
1985	Elegant Life	5	Jorge Velásquez	Michael Brice	Irma Brice	6 F	1:10.80	$43,740
1984	Columbia Holme	4	Ruben Hernandez	Ramon M. Hernandez	Assunta Louis Farm	6 F	1:10.20	$43,320
1983	Master Digby	4	Ángel Cordero Jr.	Howard Tesher	Jerome Brody	6 F	1:10.40	$33,780
1982	Accipiter's Hope	4	Nick Santagata	Stephen L. DiMauro	Harold I. Snyder	6 F	1:12.20	$34,020
1981	Kim's Chance	5	Ángel Cordero Jr.	Steven T. Jerkens	Rodger E. Leslie	6 F	1:11.40	$32,700
1980	Kim's Chance	4	Ruben Hernandez	Steven T. Jerkens	Rodger E. Leslie	6 F	1:12.40	$31,920
1979	Billy Redcoat	5	Joseph Brocklebank	R. Von Skopczynski Jr.	Victoria Sloma	6 F	1:11.40	$33,090
