= Bill Shoemaker =

American Champion jockey (1931–2003)

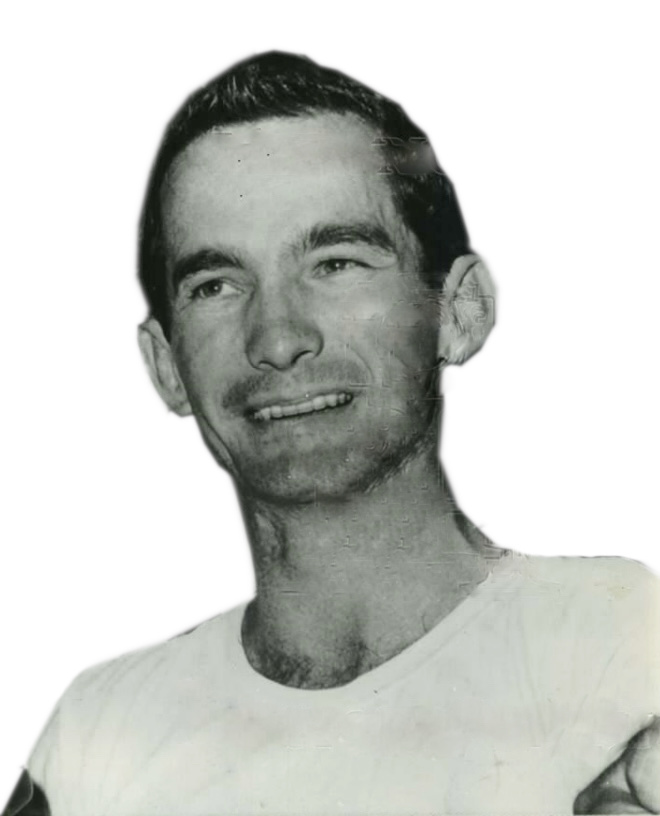
- Shoemaker in 1965

Personal information
- Born: August 19, 1931 Fabens, Texas, U.S.
- Died: October 12, 2003 (aged 72) San Marino, California, U.S.
- Occupation: Jockey

Horse racing career
- Sport: Horse racing
- Career wins: 8,833

Major racing wins
- Arlington Handicap (4); Bing Crosby Handicap (3); Blue Grass Stakes (6); Carleton F. Burke Handicap (7); Clement L. Hirsch Handicap (4); Del Mar Debutante Stakes (5); Del Mar Futurity (6); Del Mar Handicap (8); Del Mar Oaks (4); Hollywood Derby (8); Hollywood Gold Cup (8); Jockey Club Gold Cup (4); Oak Tree Invitational Stakes (8); Palomar Breeders' Cup Handicap (5); Ramona Handicap (5); San Diego Handicap (4); San Luis Obispo Handicap (8); Santa Anita Derby (8); Santa Anita Handicap (11); United Nations Handicap (3); American Classics / Breeders' Cup wins: Kentucky Derby (1955, 1959, 1965, 1986); Preakness Stakes (1963, 1967); Belmont Stakes (1957, 1959, 1962, 1967, 1975); Breeders' Cup Classic (1987)

Racing awards
- United States Champion Jockey by earnings (10 years); United States Champion Jockey by wins (1950, 1953, 1954, 1958, 1959); George Woolf Memorial Jockey Award (1951); Big Sport of Turfdom Award (1969); Eclipse Award for Outstanding Jockey (1981); Eclipse Award of Merit (1981); Mike Venezia Memorial Award (1990)

Honors
- National Museum of Racing and Hall of Fame (1958); Fair Grounds Racing Hall of Fame (1971); Shoemaker Mile Stakes at Hollywood Park; Lifesize bust at Santa Anita Park

Significant horses
- Swaps; Round Table; Northern Dancer; Buckpasser; Ack Ack; Ferdinand; Cicada; Damascus; Gallant Man; Sword Dancer; Forego; Jaipur; John Henry; Spectacular Bid; Gamely; Silky Sullivan; Candy Spots; Tom Rolfe
- Updated on March 6, 2007

William Lee Shoemaker (August 19, 1931 – October 12, 2003) was an American jockey, considered one of the greatest. For 29 years he held the world record for the most professional jockey victories.

== Early life ==
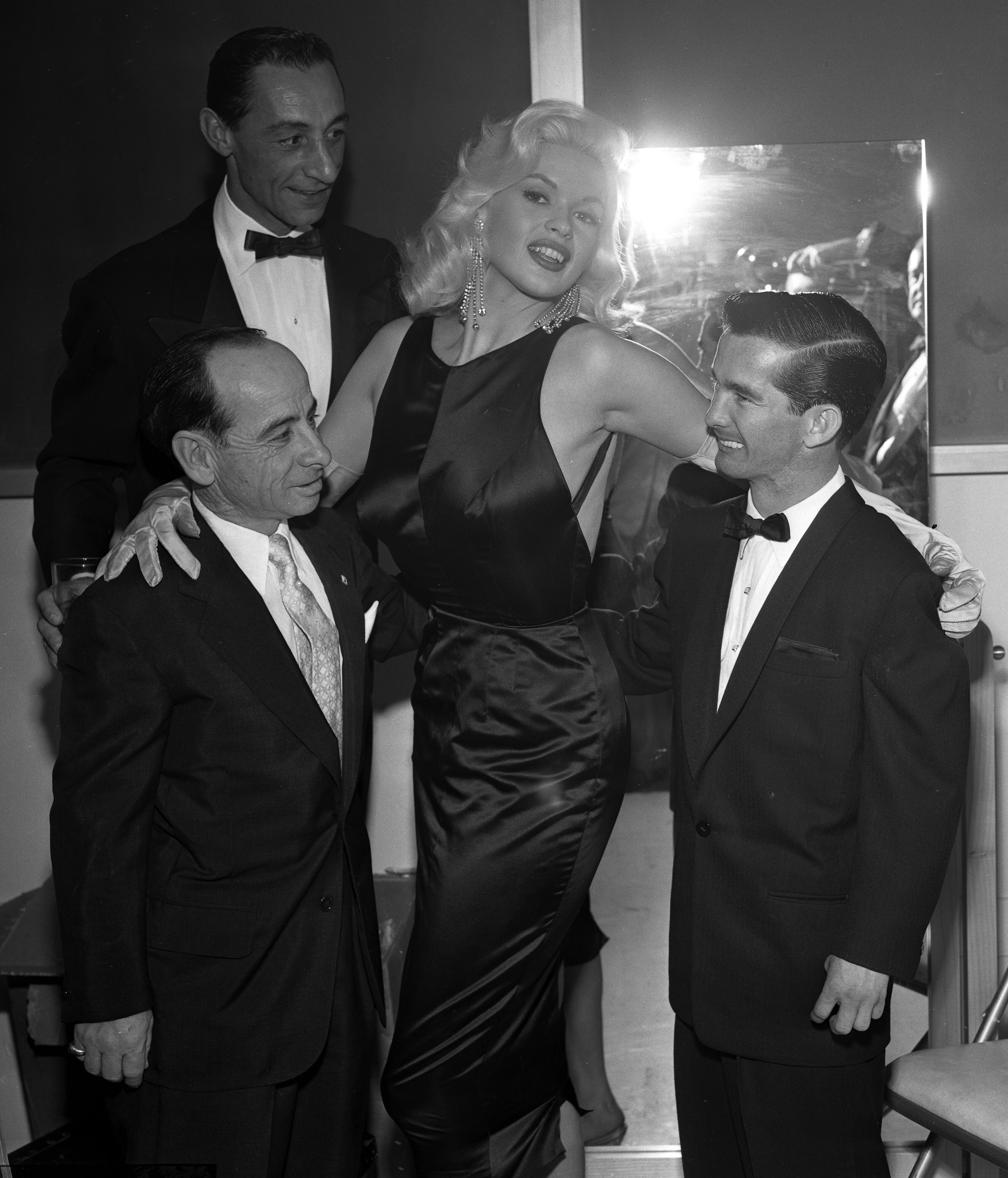
Jayne Mansfield with (left to right) jockeys Johnny Longden, Eddie Arcaro and Willie Shoemaker in 1957

Referred to as "Bill", "Willie," and "The Shoe", William Lee Shoemaker was born in Fabens, Texas. Born weighing 38 ounces (1.1 kg), Shoemaker was so small at birth he was not expected to survive the night. To keep him warm, his parent put him in a shoebox on the oven. Shoemaker remained small, growing to 4 feet 10 inches (1.47 m) and weighing 91 pounds (41 kg). His diminutive size proved an asset in thoroughbred horse racing, where he became a giant of the sport. Shoemaker never completed high school, dropping out of El Monte High School in El Monte, California.

== Jockey career ==
Shoemaker's career as a jockey began in his teenage years. He made his first professional ride on March 19, 1949. The first of his eventual 8,833 career victories came a month later, on April 20, aboard Shafter V, at Golden Gate Fields in Albany, California. In 1951, he won the George Woolf Memorial Jockey Award.

At the age of 19, he was making so much money (as much as $2,500 per week), Horace Hahn with the consent of Shoemaker's parents was appointed by the Los Angeles Superior Court as his guardian.

Thirty years later, he won the Eclipse Award for Outstanding Jockey in the United States.

Shoemaker won eleven Triple Crown races during his career, spanning four different decades, but the Crown itself eluded him. The breakdown of these wins is as follows:

- Kentucky Derby: Swaps (1955), Tomy Lee (1959), Lucky Debonair (1965) and Ferdinand (1986)
- Preakness Stakes: Candy Spots (1963) and Damascus (1967)
- Belmont Stakes: Gallant Man (1957), Sword Dancer (1959), Jaipur (1962), Damascus (1967) and Avatar (1975)

Two of Shoemaker's most noted rides were in the Kentucky Derby. He lost the 1957 Kentucky Derby aboard Gallant Man, when he stood up in the stirrups too soon, having misjudged the finish line. This caused Gallant Man to briefly lose his stride and slowed his rush for the wire, and he finished second to Iron Liege, ridden by Bill Hartack. At the 1986 Kentucky Derby, Shoemaker became the oldest jockey ever to win the race (at age 54) aboard the 18-1 outsider Ferdinand. The following year, he rode Ferdinand to a victory over Alysheba in the Breeders' Cup Classic; Ferdinand later captured Horse of the Year honors.

Shoemaker rode the popular California horse Silky Sullivan, about which he is quoted as saying: "You just had to let him run his race ... and if he decided to win it, you'd better hold on because you'd be moving faster than a train."

When Shoemaker earned his 6,033rd victory in September 1970, he broke jockey Johnny Longden's record. In 1999, Shoemaker's own record of 8,833 career victories was broken by Panamanian-born Laffit Pincay Jr.; in 2006 Russell Baze tied Pincay's record.

Win number 8,833, Shoemaker's last, came at Gulfstream Park in Hallandale, Florida, on January 20, 1990, aboard Beau Genius. Two weeks later, on February 3, Shoemaker rode his last race on Patchy Groundfog, at Santa Anita Park in Arcadia, California. He finished fourth, in front of a record crowd, to Eddie Delahoussaye, on Exemplary Leader. All told, Bill Shoemaker rode in a record 40,350 races. In 1990, he was voted the Mike Venezia Memorial Award for "extraordinary sportsmanship and citizenship".

The Marlboro Cup of 1976 at Belmont Park proved to be maybe his greatest racing achievement, and it was upon Forego. Forego's drive started from eighth position out of eleven horses on the backstretch. It culminated with a charge through the muddy middle-of-the-track stretch run, leading to a victory by a nose over Honest Pleasure. Shoemaker was quoted as saying that Forego was the best horse he had ever ridden.

Shoemaker rode three-time champion Spectacular Bid in the horse's final 13 races from 1979 to 1980 losing only once during that stretch. This included Spectacular Bid's nine-for-nine 1980 season, culminating in a walkover in the Woodward Stakes. In his autobiography Shoemaker (1988) he called Spectacular Bid the greatest horse he rode in his career.

== After 1990 jockey retirement ==
Soon after retiring as a jockey in 1990, Shoemaker returned to the track as a trainer, where he had modest success, training for such clients as Gulfstream magnate Allen Paulson and composer Burt Bacharach.

He continued to train racehorses until his retirement on November 2, 1997. His final stats as a trainer were 90 wins from 714 starters and earnings of $3.7 million.

Shoemaker was involved in a solo drunk-driving car crash on April 8, 1991, in San Dimas, California, when he rolled over the Ford Bronco II he was driving. The accident left him paralyzed from the neck down, and he thereafter used a wheelchair. Even though a blood sample drawn 98 minutes after he entered the hospital showed his blood-alcohol at .13, above California's legal limit of .08, Shoemaker did not accept blame for the crash. He sued the California Department of Transportation for not installing guard rails along the highway and Ford Motor Company for faulty vehicle design (as the Bronco II was infamous for it higher rollover risk). Ford settled with Shoemaker for $1,000,000.

Shoemaker authored three murder mysteries. They were often compared to the large stable of best-selling horse mysteries by fellow jockey/author Dick Francis. Shoemaker's Stalking Horse (1994), Fire Horse (1995), and Dark Horse (1996) all featured jockey-turned-sleuth Coley Killebrew using his racetrack experience in and about his restaurant and the horse world.

Shoemaker died on October 12, 2003, of natural causes at his home in San Marino, California. He was 72 years old. He was survived by his adopted son and biological daughter, Amanda.

== Honors ==
Shoemaker was inducted into the National Museum of Racing and Hall of Fame in 1958. He was immortalized as part of a series of portraits by Andy Warhol in the mid-1970s.

Preceded by Mike Venezia	Jockeys' Guild President; 1981-1989	Succeeded by Jerry Bailey
Preceded by Johnny Longden	Most victories in Horse-racing; 8,833	Succeeded by Laffit Pincay, Jr.
