= Ashley T. Cole =

American lawyer

Ashley Trimble Cole
- Born: July 11, 1876; New York City, New York
- Died: February 23, 1965 (aged 88); Doctors Hospital, Manhattan, New York
- Education: Columbia University, New York Law School
- Occupations: Lawyer, Chairman of the New York State Racing Commission
- Political party: Democratic
- Board member of: New York State World's Fair Commission
- Spouse: Alice Leavy
- Children: Ashley Jr. Hugh, Bettina Ashley Cole grandchildren Hugh A. Cole Jr,
- Parent(s): Ashley William Cole, Mary Louise Trimble

Ashley Trimble Cole (July 11, 1876 – November 23, 1965) was a lawyer in New York City who was active in both city and state politics as well as a noted equestrian.

== Biography ==
=== Early life ===
Ashley Trimble Cole was born on July 11, 1876, in New York City. He graduated from Columbia University and the New York Law School.

=== Career ===
He began practicing the Law in 1900 and was appointed legal counsel for the Union Carbide and Carbon Corporation in 1916. He was a member of the New York State World's Fair Commission from 1936 to 1941 and was Chairman of the New York State Racing Commission from 1945 to 1965.

=== Horse racing ===
A key figure in the creation of the New York Racing Association, the Ashley T. Cole Handicap for New York bred horses run annually at Belmont Park since 1976 is named in his honor.

=== Collector ===
He was a collector of military and other autographs who, according to the New York Public Library, assembled "one of the most impressive collections of material anywhere at the time."

=== Death ===
He died on November 23, 1965, in New York City.
