= Capades =

American-bred Thoroughbred racehorse

- Sire: Overskate
- Grandsire: Nodouble
- Dam: Medal of Valor
- Damsire: Damascus
- Sex: Filly
- Foaled: 1986
- Country: United States
- Colour: Chestnut
- Breeder: Gerald A. Nielsen
- Owner: Poma Stable
- Trainer: Richard O'Connell
- Record: 27: 11-9-3
- Earnings: US$1,051,006

Major wins
- Selima Stakes (1988); Athenia Handicap (1989); Broad Brush Stakes (1989); Canterbury Oaks (1989); Nijana Handicap (1989); Mount Vernon Stakes (1989); Matchmaker Stakes (1990); New York Handicap (1990)

Honours
- Capades Stakes at Saratoga Race Course (2006–2007) at Aqueduct (2011)
- Last updated on 7 July 2021

Capades (foaled 1986 in New York) is a retired American Thoroughbred racehorse whom the July 24, 1989 edition of The New York Times called "one of the country's most accomplished 3-year-old grass fillies."

Capades was sired by Overskate, a Canadian Horse Racing Hall of Fame inductee who won an unprecedented nine Sovereign Awards while racing in Canada and the United States. Capades dam was the racing mare, Medal of Valor, a daughter of U.S. Racing Hall of Fame inductee, Damascus.

Trained from a base in New York by Richard O'Connell, at age two Capades won the Selima Stakes at Maryland's Laurel Park Racecourse. At age three, Capades won important races for fillies but showed how good she really was in her first start against colts at Pimlico Race Course. The only filly in a field of eight three-year-olds, Capades won the 1989 Broad Brush Stakes by five and a half lengths.

Capades continued to race at age four, notably winning the Matchmaker Stakes at Atlantic City Race Course in New Jersey and the New York Handicap at Belmont Park. She was retired to broodmare duty having earned in excess of a million dollars.

Bred to stallions such as Dixieland Band, Gulch, and Lyphard, among others, Capades' offspring who raced met with limited success.
