= Irish Linnet =

American-bred Thoroughbred racehorse

- Sire: Seattle Song
- Grandsire: Seattle Slew
- Dam: Royal Slip
- Damsire: Royal Match
- Sex: Mare
- Foaled: 1988
- Country: United States
- Colour: Dark Bay/Brown
- Breeder: Austin Delaney
- Owner: Austin Delaney
- Trainer: Leo O'Brien
- Record: 61: 19-16-10
- Earnings: US$1,220,179

Major wins
- Yaddo Handicap (1991, 1992, 1993, 1994, 1995); Squander Stakes (1991); Lake Country Stakes (1991); Cathy Baby Stakes (1991); Noble Damsel Handicap (1994, 1995); Penn National Breeders' Cup Handicap (1994); Ticonderoga Handicap (1995); New York Handicap (1995)

Irish Linnet (foaled 1988 in New York) is an American Thoroughbred racehorse who accomplished the very rare feat in Thoroughbred racing of winning five consecutive editions of the same stakes race, doing it from 1991 through 1995. She was bred and raced by Austin Delaney, an Irish immigrant, who as a young man reportedly arrived in the United States with five shillings in his pocket and became a highly successful restaurateur. Irish Linnet was sired by Seattle Song, a son of 1977 U. S. Triple Crown champion, Seattle Slew, and out of the mare Royal Slip.

In her final year of racing in 1995, Irish Linnet won the biggest race of her career, taking the Grade II New York Handicap. She capped off her career with her fifth straight win in the Yaddo Handicap as well as her second straight victory in the Noble Damsel Handicap at Belmont Park.

Retired to broodmare duty after her 1995 racing season, Irish Linnet has produced eight foals. Among others, she was bred to top sires such as Giant's Causeway, Rahy, Red Ransom and Seeking The Gold.
