= Gary Sciacca =

American race horse trainer

Personal information
- Born: March 10, 1960 (age 66) Brooklyn, New York, United States
- Occupation: Trainer

Horse racing career
- Sport: Horse racing
- Career wins: 1,000+ (ongoing)

Major racing wins
- Ashley T. Cole Handicap (1986, 2000); Hollie Hughes Handicap (1990); Beldame Stakes (1992); Comely Stakes (1992); Gazelle Stakes (1992); Bowling Green Handicap (1993); Poker Stakes (1994); Saranac Stakes (1995); Hollywood Derby (1997); Jamaica Handicap (1997); Eddie Read Handicap (1998); Brooklyn Handicap (1998); Vagrancy Handicap (1999); Fort Marcy Handicap (1998); Yaddo Handicap (1999, 2000); Endeavour Breeders' Cup Stakes (2000); Kingston Handicap (2001)

Significant horses
- Saratoga Dew, Subordination

Gary Sciacca (born March 10, 1960, in Brooklyn, New York) is an American horse trainer in the sport of Thoroughbred horse racing. He has been involved in the racing industry for over forty years and has over 1,000 race wins.

== Biography ==
Sciacca earned his first win as a professional trainer on October 21, 1981 at New York's Aqueduct Racetrack. In 1992, he conditioned Saratoga Dew to American Champion Three-Year-Old Filly honors, the first New York-bred horse to win an Eclipse Award.

Sciacca was charged in 2003 for giving a horse an illegal substance.

On November 18, 2008, Sciacca began serving a 120-day suspension order issued by the New York State Racing and Wagering Board. for Under the Trainers Responsibility Rule, the Board found him accountable for a milkshaking incident at his stable which occurred while he was on vacation.

In 2013, he trained Saratoga Snacks to victory in the $250,000 Empire Classic Handicap for owner Bill Purcells. After being fired as the horse's trainer, Sciacca purchased the horse and managed his retirement.

He earned his 1000th win in November 2021, just over four decades on from his first win.
