= Evan Shipman Handicap =

- Class: Ungraded
- Location: Saratoga Race Course, Saratoga Springs, New York
- Inaugurated: 1981

Race information
- Distance: 1 mile
- Track: Left-handed
- Purse: $125,000

The Evan Shipman Handicap (NYB) is a race restricted to New York bred Thoroughbred horses, age three-years-old and up, run at Belmont Park in the state of New York. (In 2014 & 2015, it was run at Saratoga Race Course.)

== Origin ==
The race, which was run for the 36th time in 2015, is named for Evan Shipman, long a racing columnist for the New York Morning Telegraph and one of the world's authorities on Thoroughbred and harness racing and breeding. Shipman died in 1957, and is buried in the Gilkey Cemetery beside the family estate in Plainfield, New Hampshire. He was a friend of Ernest Hemingway and a chapter is devoted to Shipman in A Moveable Feast, Scribner's, 1964.

== History ==
Until 2013, the race was set at a distance of one and one/sixteenth miles on the dirt, the ungraded stakes event offers a purse of $100,000 added.

The Evan Shipman was run at one mile in the years 1981 and 1982. It was run at 1 1/8th miles in 2014 & 2015.

Due to the troubled economy in 2008, the Evan Shipman was canceled by the NYRA as they adjusted races to meet the new Grade I standard purse of $300,000.

The race began again in 2010 with a purse of $75,000 at the distance of 9 furlongs. By 2013 the purse was again up to $100,000.

== Records ==
Most wins:

- 2 – Richmond Runner (1994, 1997)
- 2 – Spite The Devil (2004, 2006)
- 2 – Royal Posse (2015, 2016)

Most wins by a jockey:

- 4 – Robbie Davis (1987, 1994, 1997, 1998)
- 4 – Edgar Prado (2003, 2004, 2005, 2010)

Most wins by a trainer:

- 3 – H. Allen Jerkens (1995, 2004, 2005)
- 3 – Rudy R. Rodriguez (2015, 2016, 2024)

Most wins by an owner:

- 3 – Chester Broman Sr. & Mary Broman (2013, 2018, 2019)

== Past winners ==
Year	Horse	Jockey	Trainer	Owner	Time
2024	Bank Frenzy	Flavien Prat	Rudy R. Rodriguez	LSU Stables	1:37.27
2023	Dr. Ardito	Manuel Franco	Chad C. Brown	Michael Dubb & Michael J. Caruso	1:37.77
2022	Bankit	Joel Rosario	Steven M. Asmussen	Winchell Thoroughbreds & Willis Horton Racing	1:39.24
2021	Sea Foam	Joel Rosario	Michelle Giangiulio	Ten Strike Racing & Four Corners Racing Stable	1:50.91
2019	Mr. Buff	Junior Alvarado	John C. Kimmel	Chester Broman Sr. & Mary Broman	1:51.65
2018	Can You Diggit	Junior Alvarado	James A. Jerkens	Chester Broman Sr. & Mary Broman	1:49.93
2017	Diversify	Irad Ortiz Jr.	Richard Violette Jr.	Lauren Evans & Ralph M. Evans	1:47.48
2016	Royal Posse	Irad Ortiz Jr.	Rudy R. Rodriguez	Michael Dubb, Bethleham Stables & Gary Aisquith	1:49.44
2015	Royal Posse	Javier Castellano	Rudy R. Rodriguez	Michael Dubb, Bethleham Stables & Gary Aisquith	1:49.91
2014	Sinistra	Rosie Napravnik	Karl M. Grusmark	Chevalier Stable	1:51.96
2013	Bigger is Bettor	Joseph Rocco Jr.	Rodrigo A. Ubillo	Chester Broman Sr. & Mary Broman	1:51.07
2012	Lunar Victory	Junior Alvarado	William I. Mott	Juddmonte Farm	1:49.30
2011	Icabad Crane	Rajiv Maragh	H. Graham Motion	Earle I. Mack	1:51.42
2010	Giant Moon	Edgar Prado	Richard E. Schosberg	Albert Fried Jr.	1:49.31
2007	Shuffling Maddnes	Cornelio Velásquez	Del Carroll	Trinacria USA Stable	1:41.54
2006	Spite The Devil	Javier Castellano	H. Allen Jerkens	Hardwicke Stable	1:43.79
2005	Yankee Mon	Edgar Prado	Juan Rodriguez	Windmill Manor Farm	1:43.52
2004	Spite The Devil	Edgar Prado	H. Allen Jerkens	Hardwicke Stable	1:41.89
2003	Well Fancied	Edgar Prado	Richard Dutrow, Jr.	Sanford Goldfarb	1:40.94
2002	Sherpa Guide	José A. Santos	Thomas M. Bush	Berkshire Stud	1:42.71
2001	Fourth and Six	Jorge Chavez	Gerald Brooks	Richard Englander	1:43.68
2000	Gander	Jerry Bailey	John Terranova II	Gatsas Stables	1:42.07
1999	Sophisticated Man	Aaron Gryder	William I. Mott	John Franks	1:43.68
1998	Saratoga Sunrise	Robbie Davis	Richard E. Schosberg	Kenneth & Sarah Ramsey	1:43.69
1997	Richmond Runner	Robbie Davis	Frank A. Alexander	Frank A. Alexander & David P. Reynolds	1:39.81
1996	Ormsby	Julie Krone	Sue Alpers	Woodside Stud	1:41.66
1995	Patsyprospect	Julie Krone	H. Allen Jerkens	Black Marlin Stable	1:42.69
1994	Richmond Runner	Robbie Davis	Frank A. Alexander	David P. Reynolds	1:42.67
1993	Liver Stand	Jorge Chavez	Stanley Shapoff	Mine Hill Stable	1:42.67
1992	Corax	Julie Krone	Thomas M. Bush	Joseph T. Sequra	1:42.74
1991	Packett's Landing	Mike E. Smith	Dennis J. Brida	Michael Watral	1:42.75
1990	Tinchen's Prince	Jacinto Vásquez	Richard A. DeStasio	Albert Fried Jr.	1:43.81
1989	Whodam	Ángel Cordero Jr.	Richard E. Dutrow Jr.	Robert J. Bauer	1:42.72
1988	Claramount	Chris Antley	Howard M. Tesher	Edwin Wachtel	1:41.73
1987	Easy n Dirty	Robbie Davis	Paulino Ortiz	Paulino Ortiz	1:43.78
1986	Romancer	Antonio Graell	Patrick J. Kelly	Live Oak Plantation	1:42.71
1985	Judge Costa	Jean Cruguet	Flint S. Schulhofer	Letsbelucky Stable	1:41.66
1984	Mugatea	Ángel Cordero Jr.	John O. Hertler	Paul Hoffman	1:42.68
1983	Shy Groom	Ángel Cordero Jr.	Stephen A. DiMauro	Dogwood Stable	1:44.76
1982	Prosper	Eddie Maple	Willard C. Freeman	Mrs. Charles H. Thieriot	1:37.72
1981	Fio Rito	Leslie Hulet	Michael Ferraro	Raymond LeCasse	1:35.69
