= Mike Venezia =

American horse racing jockey (1945–1988)

Personal information
- Born: May 5, 1945 Brooklyn, New York, United States
- Died: October 13, 1988 (aged 43) Elmont, New York
- Resting place: Cemetery of the Holy Rood, Westbury, New York
- Occupation: Jockey

Horse racing career
- Sport: Horse racing
- Career wins: 2,313

Major racing wins
- Bahamas Stakes (1965); Round Table Handicap (1970); Stars and Stripes Handicap (1971); Hempstead Handicap (1971); Carter Handicap (1972); Ladies Handicap (1972, 1977); Queens County Handicap (1972); Firenze Handicap (1973); Sanford Stakes (1973); Saratoga Special Stakes (1973, 1974, 1980); Remsen Stakes (1974); Diana Handicap (1975); Gotham Stakes (1975, 1982); Lexington Handicap (1975); Roamer Handicap (1975, 1977); Washington Park Handicap (1977); Alabama Stakes (1978); Sport Page Breeders' Cup Handicap (1978); Queen Charlotte Handicap (1978); Mount Vernon Stakes (1979); Violet Handicap (1979); Nassau County Handicap (1980); Secretariat Stakes (1981); Busher Stakes (1982); Excelsior Handicap (1982); Demoiselle Stakes (1983); East View Stakes (1983); Arlington Handicap (1984); Bertram F. Bongard Stakes (1985); Aqueduct Handicap (1986); Discovery Handicap (1986); Stuyvesant Handicap (1987) International race wins: Canadian International Stakes (1980)

Honors
- Mike Venezia Memorial Award

Significant horses
- Sensational, White Star Line, Majestic Light, Air Forbes Won, Who's For Dinner
- Updated on April 24, 2007

Michael Joseph Venezia (May 5, 1945 – October 13, 1988) was an American Thoroughbred horse racing jockey who was killed in a horse racing accident.

== Early life ==
Venezia was born on May 5, 1945, in Brooklyn, New York City.

== Career ==
Venezia had been a jockey for twenty-five years and rode his first winner in 1964. He had ridden 2,313 winners when he was thrown from his horse, Mr. Walter K. and trampled to death by a trailing horse during a race at Belmont Park. The New York Times reported he had recently said that the highlight of his career came on December 7, 1964, when he won six races in one day at Aqueduct Racetrack.

Venezia was actually named Frederick Venezia (by tradition, after his paternal grandfather) when he was born. But his uncle, Michael Venezia, a Sergeant in the United States Army was killed in action while fighting in Germany on April 18, 1945, so when the telegram announcing the tragic event arrived just after the birth, the name was changed to Michael in honor of the fallen uncle.

== Death ==
Venezia was killed in a horse racing accident on October 13, 1988. He was survived by his wife, Helene, son, Michael Edward, and daughter, Alison.

== Legacy ==
Annually since 1989, the New York Racing Association provides the Mike Venezia Memorial Award to a rider who exemplifies extraordinary sportsmanship and citizenship. Active in jockey affairs, Venezia served as president of the Jockeys' Guild from 1975 to 1981.

Preceded by Walter Blum	Jockeys' Guild President; 1975–1981	Succeeded by Bill Shoemaker
