= Edgar Prado =

American jockey

Edgar S. Prado
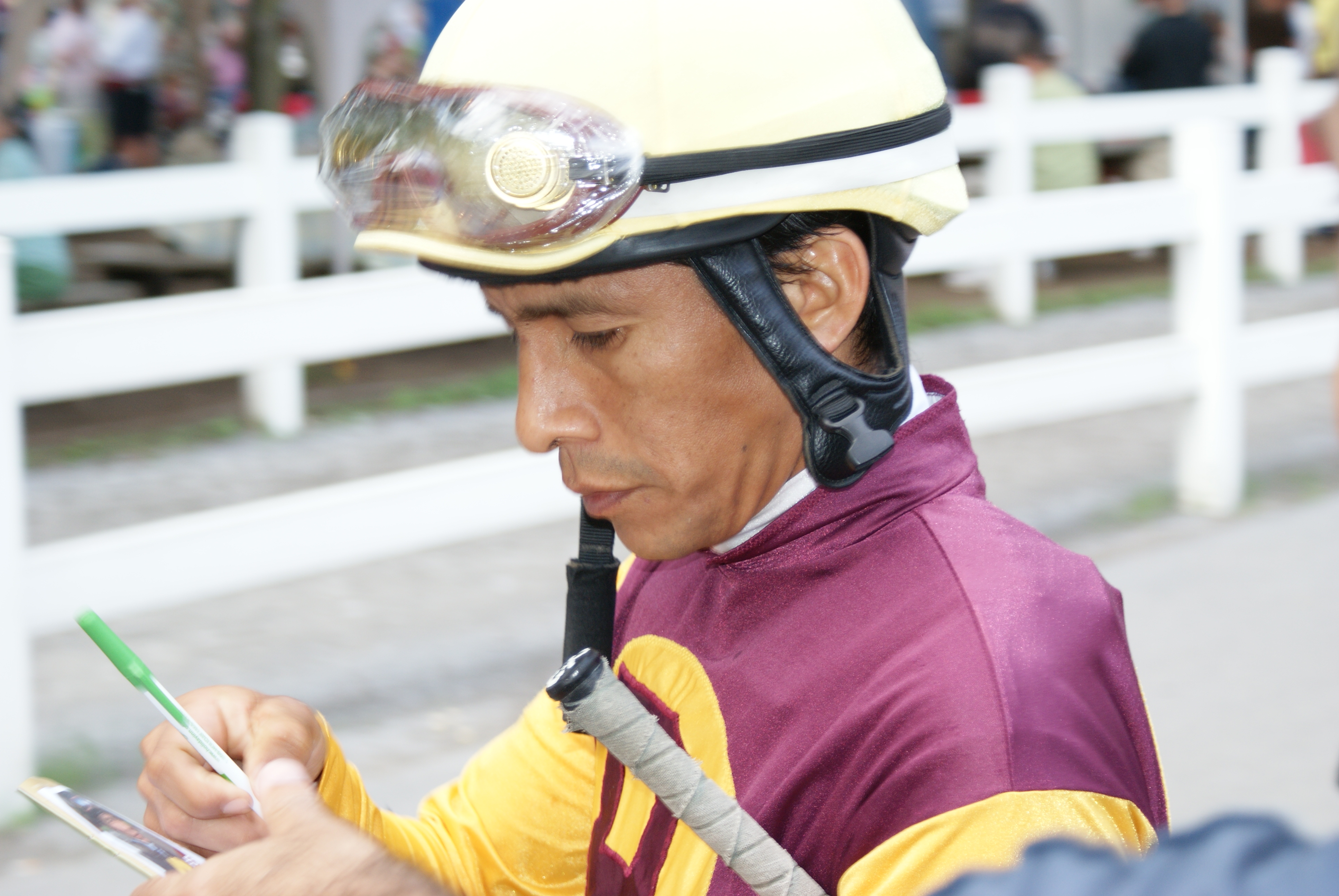
- Edgar Prado signs an autograph at Saratoga Race Course on August 22, 2009.

Personal information
- Born: June 12, 1967 (age 59) Lima, Lima Province, Peru
- Occupation: Jockey

Horse racing career
- Sport: Horse racing
- Career wins: 7,119 in North America

Major racing wins
- Grade 1 stakes wins: Budweiser International Stakes (1991); Philip Handicap Iselin Handicap (1992); Woodward Stakes (2000); Whitney Handicap (2000, 2004); Fountain of Youth Stakes (2001); Go for Wand Handicap (2001); Test Stakes (2001, 2004); Frizette Stakes (2001); Alabama Stakes (2001); Turf Classic Invitational Stakes (2001, 2002); Belmont Futurity Stakes (2002); Hopeful Stakes (2002); Garden City Breeders' Cup Handicap (2002); Donn Handicap (2002, 2005, 2013); Spinster Stakes (2002, 2003); Shadwell Turf Mile Stakes (2002, 2003, 2016); Toyota Blue Grass Stakes (2002, 2003, 2008); Florida Derby (2002, 2006, 2007); Matron Stakes (2003, 2004, 2005); Spinaway Stakes (2003); Acorn Stakes (2003); Queen Elizabeth II Challenge Cup Stakes (2003); Haskell Invitational Handicap (2003); Santa Anita Handicap (2003); Forego Handicap (2004); Gulfstream Park Breeders' Cup Handicap (2004); King's Bishop Stakes (2004, 2015); Diana Stakes (2004); Man O' War Stakes (2004, 2006); United Nations Handicap (2004); Travers Stakes (2004); Mother Goose Stakes (2005, 2006); Coaching Club American Oaks (2005, 2006); Suburban Handicap (2005); Ashland Stakes (2005); Stephen Foster Handicap (2005); Ballerina Breeders' Cup Stakes (2006); Malibu Stakes (2006); Manhattan Handicap (2006, 2018); Matriarch Stakes (2006, 2016); Metropolitan Handicap (2006); Frank J. De Francis Memorial Dash Stakes (2007); American Oaks (2007); Carter Handicap (2008); Ruffian Handicap (2008); Cigar Mile Handicap (2008); Champagne Stakes (2008, 2009); Hollywood Starlet Stakes (2008); Wood Memorial Stakes (2008); Jamaica Handicap (2009); Princess Rooney Handicap (2009); Humana Distaff Stakes (2013); Woodford Reserve Turf Classic Stakes (2016) American Classics wins: Kentucky Derby (2006); Belmont Stakes (2002, 2004); Kentucky Oaks (2003) Breeders' Cup wins: Breeders' Cup Juvenile Fillies (2005); Breeders' Cup Sprint (2005, 2015); Breeders' Cup Ladies' Classic (2006); Breeders' Cup Filly and Mare Turf (2010)

Racing awards
- United States Champion Jockey by wins (1997, 1998, 1999); George Woolf Memorial Jockey Award (2003); Mike Venezia Memorial Award (2006); Eclipse Award for Outstanding Jockey (2006)

Honours
- United States Racing Hall of Fame (2008)

Significant horses
- Lemon Drop Kid, Saint Liam, Funny Cide, Peace Rules, Birdstone, Silver Train, Lost in the Fog, Barbaro, Scat Daddy, Point of Entry, Runhappy
- Updated on April 1, 2007

Edgar S. Prado (born June 12, 1967) is a retired Peruvian jockey in thoroughbred horse racing.

Prado's big break came in 1997 when he won 536 races, making him the fourth rider in history to win 500 races in one year. Much of that success was gained in Maryland, where he ruled that circuit for several years.

A resident of Hollywood, Florida, in 2004 Prado became the 19th jockey in thoroughbred racing history to win 5,000 races. Edgar is married to Liliana and has three children named Edgar Jr, Louis and Patricia. Louis works as a scribe at Joe DiMaggio Children's Hospital in Hollywood, Florida.

== Career ==
On May 6, 2006, Prado rode Barbaro to victory in the 132nd Kentucky Derby, 6½ lengths ahead of the second finisher, Bluegrass Cat. The margin of victory was the largest since Triple Crown winner Assault won by eight lengths in 1946. Barbaro was pulled up following a horrific ankle injury during the Preakness Stakes two weeks later. Prado was visibly moved, declining comment, but by all accounts his fast action on the track contributed to saving the colt's life. (However, Barbaro was euthanized by veterinarians at the University of Pennsylvania's New Bolton Center on January 29, 2007.)

Other racing accomplishments include victories in the 2002 and 2004 Belmont Stakes, in each case aboard a longshot depriving a favorite of the United States Triple Crown. In 2002 Prado won the Belmont aboard Sarava, who is the longest shot to ever win the Belmont Stakes in its history at odds of 70¼/1. In 2004 Prado rode Birdstone to victory in the Belmont, denying heavy favorite Smarty Jones the Triple Crown. Prado and Birdstone then went on to win the prestigious Travers Stakes at the Saratoga Race Course in Saratoga Springs, New York in August 2004.

Prado won the 2003 NTRA All-Star Jockey Championship at Lone Star Park in Grand Prairie, Texas, finishing with 22 points after recording one win, one second-place finish, and a decisive third-place finish in the final race to edge Shane Sellers by a single point, 22 to 21. The victory marked Prado's second All-Star Jockey Championship title, following his 2000 win, making him the only jockey to win the event twice.

Prado had not won a Breeders' Cup race until 2005, when he won two, riding Folklore to victory in the Breeders' Cup Juvenile Fillies and Silver Train in the Breeders' Cup Sprint.

On September 24, 2006, Prado received the New York Racing Association's 2006 Mike Venezia Memorial Award in a paddock ceremony at Belmont Park. The winner of this award is decided by the votes of fellow jockeys, turf writers and an online vote by fans. It honors those "...who exemplify extraordinary sportsmanship and citizenship", and is given in memory of Mike Venezia, killed on October 13, 1988, in a spill at Belmont Park.

On February 10, 2008, at Gulfstream Park, Edgar Prado achieved his 6000th win. Only 16 jockeys in the United States have achieved this record.

Prado is involved with Belmont Park's "Anna House", a child day care centre providing care for the children of backstretch workers.

On August 4, 2008, he was formally inducted into the National Museum of Racing Hall of Fame.

On October 31, 2015, he rode Runhappy to Breeder's Cup Sprint victory setting a new track record.

On May 15, 2018, Prado became the eighth North American Rider to reach 7,000 wins.

On March 25, 2020, Prado tied for eighth on the all-time win list with Angel Cordero Jr., with a win aboard Cory Gal in that day's third race at Gulfstream Park.

Prado last rode on January 6, 2023, at Gulfstream. He announced his retirement on June 20, 2023, citing difficulties obtaining mounts and time missed with his family.

Chart (2000–present)	Rank by earnings
National Earnings List for Jockeys 2000	8
National Earnings List for Jockeys 2001	4
National Earnings List for Jockeys 2002	2
National Earnings List for Jockeys 2003	2
National Earnings List for Jockeys 2004	2
National Earnings List for Jockeys 2005	2
National Earnings List for Jockeys 2006	2
National Earnings List for Jockeys 2007	8
National Earnings List for Jockeys 2008	4
National Earnings List for Jockeys 2009	15
National Earnings List for Jockeys 2010	25
National Earnings List for Jockeys 2011	38
National Earnings List for Jockeys 2012	42
National Earnings List for Jockeys 2013	25
National Earnings List for Jockeys 2014	60
National Earnings List for Jockeys 2015	37
National Earnings List for Jockeys 2016	51
National Earnings List for Jockeys 2017	86
National Earnings List for Jockeys 2018	94
