= Jorge F. Chavez =

Peruvian jockey

Jorge Chavez
Personal information
- Born: November 25, 1961 (age 64) Callao, Peru
- Occupation: Jockey

Horse racing career
- Sport: Horse racing
- Career wins: 4,526 (through 2011)

Major racing wins
- Dwyer Stakes (1992, 2004); Ballerina Handicap (1993); Flower Bowl Invitational Stakes (1994, 2002); Hopeful Stakes (1994); Stymie Handicap (1994, 1996); Saratoga Special Stakes (1996, 1998); Travers Stakes (1996); Cigar Mile Handicap (1997, 1999); Damon Runyon Stakes (1997); Maid of the Mist Stakes (1997); Queens County Handicap (1999, 2003); Massachusetts Handicap (1999); Personal Ensign Handicap (1999, 2000); Suburban Handicap (1999, 2001); Astoria Stakes (2001, 2003); Florida Derby (2001); Sabin Stakes (2001); Woodward Stakes (2002); Super Derby (2002); Frank J. DeFrancis Memorial Dash Stakes (2002); Jerome Handicap (2002); Spectacular Bid Stakes (2003); West Virginia Governor's Stakes (2003); Lane's End Stakes(2005); Sword Dancer Invitational Handicap (2005) American Classics / Breeders' Cup wins: Kentucky Derby (2001); Breeders' Cup Distaff (1999); Breeders' Cup Sprint (1999)

Racing awards
- Eclipse Award for Outstanding Jockey (1999); National Turf Writers Association (NTWA) Award for Outstanding Jockey (1997); Mike Venezia Memorial Award (2000)

Significant horses
- Monarchos, Lido Palace, Behrens, Albert the Great, Artax, Beautiful Pleasure, Affirmed's Success

Jorge F. Chavez (born November 25, 1961) is a Peruvian jockey in American Thoroughbred horse racing.

Chavez began his career in horse racing in 1982 in his native Peru and by 1987 was his country's leading rider. In April 1988 he emigrated to the United States where he raced with a great deal of success at Florida race tracks. Moving to New York a few years later, Chavez was the leading rider on the NYRA circuit from 1994 to 1999. During this time he rose to national prominence. He won two of the 1999 Breeders' Cup races, taking both the Distaff and the Sprint. During the year Chavez also won the Cigar Mile Handicap [for the second time in his career]. As a result of his stellar year, Chavez won the 1999 Eclipse Award for Outstanding Jockey. A fan favorite on the New York circuit where he rode for many years, Chavez is affectionately referred to by the fans as "Chop Chop" due to his distinctive riding style. His riding style, specifically how he uses the "whip, appears to be somewhat aggressive. However, this is more a byproduct of Chavez having short arms, due to his height [reportedly 4' 10], as opposed to him being overly aggressive."

In 2000, he was voted the Mike Venezia Memorial Award winner for "extraordinary sportsmanship and citizenship".

In 2001, Chavez rode Monarchos to victory in the Florida Derby and then in America's most prestigious race, the Kentucky Derby. The following year he won the Woodward Stakes, however, his career started to slow after suffering a broken back in a spill in the 2003 running of the Florida Derby.

As of mid-summer 2006, Chavez had been riding on the competitive Southern California racing circuit which includes Hollywood Park, Santa Anita Park and Del Mar Racetrack. In 2007, Chavez returned to New York to compete at Saratoga Race Course for the summer meet. After the Saratoga meet, Chavez returned to Belmont to ride. He has since been riding in both New York and Florida.

On December 4, 2011, Chavez suffered a catastrophic injury while riding on the 9th race at Aqueduct. This accident unlike previous ones would become career ending. Chavez is now retired, living on Long Island with his family. He is an avid golfer and loving Grandpa.

In 2024, Chavez was officially nominated for induction into the National Museum of Racing and Hall of Fame.

== Rankings ==
All-Time Thoroughbred Leaders - Top 200 Jockeys (as of 3/1/2024)
Earnings	Wins
34	47
(Source: Equibase All Time)

Top 100 (Since 2000)
Year	Earnings	Wins
2000	6	12
2001	5	20
2022	5	29
2003	26	86
2004	36	-
2005	33	84
2008	86	-
(Source: Equibase Jockey Profile)
