= Dr. Fager Stakes =

(Florida Sire Stakes) Dr. Fager Stakes
- Class: Restricted
- Location: Gulfstream Park
- Inaugurated: 1982
- Race type: Thoroughbred – Flat racing

Race information
- Distance: 6 furlong sprint
- Surface: Dirt
- Track: left-handed
- Qualification: Two-years-olds sired by FTBOA registered stallions
- Weight: Allowance
- Purse: $100,000

The FTBOA Florida Sire Stakes Dr. Fager division is the first leg of the FTBOA Florida Sire Stakes series. Inaugurated in 1982, the race was named after the Florida-bred Horse of the Year and leading sire Dr. Fager. The race was originally run at a length of 5 1/2 furlongs, but it was moved to 6 furlongs after the inaugural running. The Dr. Fager Stakes has run in two divisions more times than either of the other two races in the Florida Stallion Stakes, with a grand total of eight races ran in two parts (1983–1987, 1990, 1991, 2001).

Since 2014, the race has been run at Gulfstream Park. Originally, it was run at Calder Race Course.

== Records ==
Speed record: (at current distance of 6 furlongs)

- 2005 In Summation (1:10.90 at Calder)
- 2016 Three Rules (1:09.49 at Gulfstream)

Most wins by a jockey:

- 3 – Gene St. Leon ((Div.2 1983, 1984) 1988)

Most wins by a trainer:

- 5 – Frank Gomez ((Div.2 – 1984, 1987, 1990, 1991) and 2005)
- 3 - Stanley Gold (2014, 2011, 2009

Most wins by an owner:

- 3 – Frances A. Genter (Div.2 – 1984, 1987, 1990)
- 3 - Jacks Or Better Farm (2014, 2011, 2009)

== Winners ==
Year	Winner	Jockey	Trainer	Owner	Distance	Time
2019	Chance It	Edgard Zayas	Saffie Joseph Jr.	Shooting Star Thoroughbreds	6F	1:11.22
2018	Cajun Firecracker	Miguel Vasquez	Michael Yates	Shadybrook Farm Inc.	6F	1:09.94
2017	Phantom Ro	Edgard Zayas	Ralph Nick	Raroma Stables	6F	1:10.60
2016	Three Rules	Cornelio Velazquez	Jose Pinchin	Shade Tree Thoroughbreds	6F	1:09.49
2015	Dream of Me	Eduard Nunez	Anna Varsi	Kathy Machesky	6F	1:12.11
2014	Sing Praises	Ramsey Zimmerman	Stanley I. Gold	Jacks or Better Farm	6F	1:11.38
2013	My Brown Eyed Guy	Eduard Nunez	Kathleen O'Connell	Gilbert G. Campbell	6F	1:12:87
2012	Two TS at Two B	Eduardo Nunez	Kathleen O'Connell	Gilbert G. Campbell	6F	1:11.68
2011	Fort Loudon	Luis Jurado	Stanley I. Gold	Jacks or Better Farm	6F	1:13.55
2010	Gourmet Dinner	Sebastian Madrid	Decisive Moment	Our Sugar Bear Stables	6F	1:12.97
2009	Jackson Bend	Jeffery Sanchez	Stanley I. Gold	Jacks or Better Farm, Inc.	6F	1:12.48
2008	Big Drama	Pascacio Lopez	David Fawkes	Harold L. Queen	6F	1:11.70
2007	Big City Man	Elvis Trujillo	Jose Pinchin	Mr. T Stables	6F	1:12.46
2006	Straight Faced	Manoel Cruz	Stephen L. Dimauro	Walter R. Donnelly LLC	6F	1:11.90
2005	In Summation	Manoel Cruz	Frank Gomez	Waterford Farm	6F	1:10.90
2004	B B Best	Eddie Castro	Edward Plesa Jr.	Beatrice Oxenberg & Laurie Ple	6F	1:11.93
2003	Sir Oscar	Julio A. Garcia	Manuel J. Azpurua	Oscar Novo	6F	1:13.31
2002	Lawbook	R. Velez	Thomas Heard Jr.	Thomas Heard Jr.	6F	1:11.28
2001	Careys Gold	R. Velez	H. Collazo	Thompson Stables	6F	1:13.56
2000	Express Tour	Julio A. Garcia	Martin Wolfson	Silva A. Clare	6F	1:11.83
1999	Snuck In	Robby Albarado	Steve Asmussen	Ackerley Brothers Farm	6F	1:11.19
1998	Ten Pound Test	Gary Boulanger	S. Standridge	Lazy S Stable & Gopher Broke	6F	1:12.00
1997	Governor Hicks	Javier Castellano	L. Olivares	Cobble View Stable	6F	1:13.40
1996	Blazing Sword	Abdiel Toribio	Kathleen O'Connell	Stonehedge Farm	6F	1:11.20
1995	Seacliff	René Douglas	William A. Kaplan	Ione & H. J. Elkins	6F	1:11.80
1994	Sea Emperor	Wigberto Ramos	E. Tortora	James Lewis Jr.	6F	1:12.80
1993	Bye Guys	Mary Russ	E. Tortora	Bee Bee Stables, Inc.	6F	1:12.20
1992	Not Surprising	W. White	W. G. De Oliveira	R. Van Worp, Jr	6F	1:11.80
1991	Majestic Sweep	P. Rodriguez	L. Olivares	Three G Stable	6F	1:12.40
1990	Mot Telbin	Stewart Elliott	J. Provost	Valiant Stable	6F	1:12.20
1989	American Dreamer	M. Gonzalez	O. Edwards	Crabapple Stable	6F	1:12.80
1988	Reappeal	Gene St. Leon	R. Root	Harry T. Mangurian Jr.	6F	1:12.80
1987	Miami Slick	Chuck Baltazar	Edward Plesa Jr.	Loretta Kessler	6F	1:11.60
1986	Quinkan Country	Manhattans Woody	Dominic Imprescia	Jane C. Scott	6F	1:13.00
1985	True Silver	O. Londono	J. Mendez	Maria Mendez, Stud Baby One Et	6F	1:13.40
1984	Emergency Call	Alex Solis	R. Felix	Devonshire Farms	6F	1:13.60
1983	No Room	S. Soto	Edward J. Yowell	October House Farm	6F	1:13.20
1982	El Kaiser	Chuck Baltazar	L. Lyons	Pony Horse Stable	5.5F	1:05.60

== Second Division Winners ==
Year	Winner	Jockey	Trainer	Owner	Distance	Time
2001	Orocky	Horacio Karamanos	Edward Plesa Jr.	Bea Oxenberg	6F	1:13.48
1991	Naked Greed	José Vélez Jr.	Frank Gomez	Jill E. Robinson	6F	1:12.00
1990	What A Cooker	M. Gonzalez	Frank Gomez	Frances A. Genter Stable, Inc.	6F	1:12.00
1987	Break Par	S. Soto	Frank Gomez	Frances A. Genter Stable, Inc.	6F	1:13.20
1986	Lord Pergrine	R. Lester	S. Ducoing	Petelain Stable	6F	1:12.80
1985	Sovereign Tom	Earlie Fires	Happy Alter	Polly Lux De Lux Farms	6F	1:13.40
1984	Smile	Gene St. Leon	Frank Gomez	Frances A. Genter	6F	1:13.60
1983	Reach For More	Gene St. Leon	W. C. Knuck	Blanche Knuck	6F	1:12.60
