= My Dear Girl Stakes =

(Florida Sires) My Dear Girl Stakes
- Class: Restricted Black Type
- Location: Gulfstream Park; Hallandale Beach, Florida
- Inaugurated: 1982
- Race type: Thoroughbred – Flat racing
- Website: www.gulfstreampark.com

Race information
- Distance: 1 1/16 miles 8.5 furlongs
- Surface: Dirt
- Track: left-handed
- Qualification: Two-year-old fillies
- Purse: US$400,000

The FTBOA Florida Sire Stakes My Dear Girl division is a Thoroughbred horse race run annually at Gulfstream Park, in Hallandale Beach, Florida for two-year-old fillies by FTBOA registered stallions at a distance of a mile and a sixteenth on dirt. It is part of the eleven-race Florida Thoroughbred Breeders' & Owners' Association (FTBOA) Florida Sire series of which seven races are hosted by Gulfstream Park and four by Tampa Bay Downs.

== History ==
Inaugurated at Calder Race Course in 1982, the race was part of Calder's Florida Stallion Stakes series through 2013 after which Calder's racing operations were leased to the Stronach Group, operators of Gulfstream Park.

Named in honor of My Dear Girl, the 1959 American Champion Two-Year-Old Filly filly, it is the final and longest of the three Gulfstream Park FBTOA races exclusively for this specific age and gender group of registered Florida-breds who are from a Florida Sire Stakes eligible stallion. Run between the beginning of August and the end of September, the My Dear Girl Stakes follows the Desert Vixen Stakes at 6 furlongs and the Susan's Girl Stakes at 7 furlongs.

== Records ==
Speed record at Gulfstream Park:

- At 1 1/16 miles : 1:44.41 by Two Sixty in 2019

Speed record at Calder:

- At 1 1/16 miles : 1:45.92 by Ivanavinalot in 2002

Most wins by a jockey:

- 3 – José A. Vélez Jr. (1985, 1989, 1991)
- 3 – Manoel Cruz (2002, 2006, 2007)

Most wins by a trainer:

- 3-Stanley Gold-(2017,2011, 2010)
- 3 – James E. Bracken (1983, 1985, 1993)
- 3 – Edward Plesa Jr. (1998, 1999, 2006)

Most wins by an owner:

- 2 – Ione & H. J. Elkins (1994, 2007)
- 2 – John A. Franks (2001, 2003)
- 2 – Gilbert G. Campbell (2002, 2013)

== Winners ==
Gulfstream Park 2018–2019 Media Guide and race history:

Year	Winner	Jockey	Trainer	Owner	Dist. (Miles)	Time	Win $
2019	Two Sixty	Edgard Zayas	Mark E. Casse	Gary Barber	1-1/16 m	1:44.41	$240,000
2017	Cookie Dough	Jeffrey Sanchez	Stanley I. Gold	Arindel	1-1/16 m	1:47.50	$240,000
2016	Dude Fantasy	Tyler Gaffalione	Ralph E. Nicks	Donald Dizney LLC	1-1/16 m	1:46.39	$300,000
2015	Flora Dora	Matthew Rispoli	Marialice Coffey	Coffeepot Stables	1-1/16 m	1:47.22	$300,000
2014	Holywell	Orlando Bocachica	Jose M. Pinchin	Tracy Pinchin	1-1/16 m	1:46.08	$215,301
2013	Scandalous Act	Eduardo O. Nunez	Kathleen O'Connnel	Gilbert G. Campbell	1-1/16 m	1:48.23	$180,420
2012	Verso A Verso	Angel Serpa	Luis Ramirez	Frank Calabrese	1-1/16 m	1:49.95	$178,560
2011	Awesome Belle	Luis Jurado	Stanley I. Gold	Jacks or Better Farm, Inc.	1-1/16 m	1:47.46	$300,000
2010	Awesome Feather	Jeffrey Sanchez	Stanley I. Gold	Jacks or Better Farm, Inc.	1-1/16 m	1:48.05	$210,490
2009	Sweetlalabye	Luis Saez	Emanuel Tortora	Jacqueline Torotora & Ancona	1-1/16 m	1:49.42	$240,000
2008	La Chica Sensual	Eddie Castro	Pablo Andrade	Jennifer Harris & Brenda Tabraue	1-1/16 m	1:48.41	$240,000
2007	Calico Bay	Manoel Cruz	William A. Kaplan	Ione & H. J. Elkins	1-1/16 m	1:48.49	$240,000
2006	Adhrhythm	Manoel Cruz	Edward Plesa Jr.	Centaur Farms	1-1/16 m	1:48.48	$240,000
2005	Consider Thesource	Sebastian Madrid	Steven W. Standridge	Rustlewood Farm, Inc.	1-1/16 m	1:47.76	$240,000
2004	Aclassysassylassy	Manuel Aguilar	David A. Vivian	Barbara Vivian & Dominic Vitesse	1-1/16 m	1:48.31	$240,000
2003	Chatter Chatter	Jerry D. Bailey	Martin D. Wolfson	John A. Franks	1-1/16 m	1:47.57	$240,000
2002	Ivanavinalot	Manoel Cruz	Kathleen O'Connnel	Gilbert G. Campbell	1-1/16 m	1:45.92	$240,000
2001	Blissful Kiss	Cornelio Velásquez	William P. White	John A. Franks	1-1/16 m	1:46.08	$240,000
2000	Valid Forbes	Julio Garcia	Ralph Ziadie	Centaur Farms, Inc.	1-1/16 m	1:47.46	$240,000
1999	Miz United States	Robby Albarado	Edward Plesa Jr.	Trilogy Stables & Laurie Plesa	1-1/16 m	1:45.99	$240,000
1998	Three Ring	Cornelio Velásquez	Edward Plesa Jr.	Barry K. Schwartz	1-1/16 m	1:47.39	$244,800
1997	Nancy's Glitter	Pedro A. Rodriguez	Fredeick O. Knibbs	Cecilia & Elbert R. Dixon	1-1/16 m	1:48.60	$240,000
1996	Dance for Thee	Eduardo O. Nunez	Leo Azpurua Jr.	Wilfredo J. Agusti	1-1/16 m	1:49.40	$216,000
1995	Effectiveness	Gary Boulanger	Thomas F. Proctor	Glen Hill Farm	1-1/16 m	1:48.00	$210,000
1994	Fortune Pending	Jorge Velásquez	William A. Kaplan	Ione & H. J. Elkins	1-1/16 m	1:48.80	$240,000
1993	Cut The Charm	Mike E. Smith	James E. Bracken	Kathy Jo Stable	1-1/16 m	1:47.20	$240,000
1992	Boots 'n Jackie	Michael Lee	Emanuel Tortora	Bee Bee Stables, Inc./Toni Tortora	1-1/16 m	1:46.80	$246,000
1991	Miss Jealski	José A. Vélez Jr.	Daniel C. Hurtak	William Wheeler	1-1/16 m	1:49.20	$240,000
1990	Doradoradora	Mike A. Gonzalez	Kent H. Stirling	Dan Dixon	1-1/16 m	1:48.60	$276,000
1989	Miss Running Vany	José A. Vélez Jr.	Richard R. Root	Harry T. Mangurian Jr.	1-1/16 m	1:48.40	$258,000
1988	Sez Forty	Jorge C. Duarte	Luis A. Olivares	Marissa Olivares & Three G Stable	1-1/16 m	1:50.20	$255,000
1987-	Laurel's Wiggle	Jorge C. Duarte	Luis A. Olivares	Laurel Farms	1-1/16 m	1:49.20	$135,000
1987-2	Balquiria	Raoul Rojas	Juan Ciuro	Quality Stable	1-1/16 m	1:50.20	$135,000
1986	Brave Raj	Pat Valenzuela	Melvin F. Stute	Dolly Green	1-1/16 m	1:49.20	$114,000
1985-1	Regal Princess	Odin J. Londono	Jose A. Mendez	Fred Berens & Sol Garazi	1-1/16 m	1:48.60	$114,000
1985-2	Final Reunion	José A. Vélez Jr.	James E. Bracken	Tartan Stable	1-1/16 m	1:49.20	$114,000
1984	Micki Bracken	Victor Molina	Estan Dominguez	Thoroughbred Breeders, Inc.	1-1/16 m	1:49.80	$210,000
1983	Early Lunch	Miguel A. Rivera	James E. Bracken	Roy Bowen & Thomas Macioce	1-1/16 m	1:48.40	$180,000
1982-1	My Sweet Baby	Frank A. Pennisi	Frank Gomez	Frances A. Genter Stable, Inc.	1-1/16 m	1:50.20	$84,000
1982-2	Flawless Diamond	Chuck Baltazar	Joseph G. Moos	Sucher Stable	1-1/16 m	1:48.20	$85,000
