= In Reality Stakes =

(Florida Sires) In Reality Stakes
- Class: Restricted Black Type
- Location: Gulfstream Park; Hallandale Beach, Florida
- Inaugurated: 1982
- Race type: Thoroughbred – Flat racing
- Website: www.calderracecourse.com

Race information
- Distance: 8.5 furlong
- Surface: Dirt
- Track: Left-handed
- Qualification: Two years old
- Weight: Assigned
- Purse: $400,000 (2018)

The FTBOA Florida Sire Stakes In Reality division is the fifth leg of the Florida Thoroughbred Breeders' & Owners' Association (FTBOA) Florida Sire series. It has been run on dirt over a distance of six furlongs since inception. The race was named in honor of the Florida-bred champion stakes winner and sire In Reality who was often referred to as a "sire of sires." The In Reality Stakes has been run in two divisions on two separate occasions in 1983 and 1986.

== History ==
Inaugurated at Calder Race Course in 1982, it was part of the Florida Stallion Stakes series through 2013 after which Calder's racing operations were leased to the Stronach Group, operators of Gulfstream Park.

== Records ==
Speed record: (at the distance of 7 furlongs)

- 1999 Kiss a Native (1:44.52)

Most wins by a jockey:

- 3 – Julio Garcia (2000, 2003, 2006)

Most wins by a trainer:

- 5 – Stanley I. Gold (2009, 2011, 2013, 2014, 2015)

Most wins by an owner:

- 5 – Jacks or Better Farm, Inc. (2009, 2011, 2013, 2014, 2015)

== Winners ==
Year	Winner	Jockey	Trainer	Owner	Dist.	Time
1982	Luv A Libra	Michael Lee	Emanuel Tortora	V. Decosta & S.Yagoda	8.5F	1:47.80
1983	My G P	Gary Bain	Harold J. Rose	Elsie Rose	8.5F	1:47.60
1984	Smile	Gene St. Leon	Frank Gomez	Genter Frances	8.5F	1:46.60
1985	Scat Dancer	Santiago Soto	Domingo Vasconcelos	Felix Castro	8.5F	1:48.80
1986	Never Waiver	Gene St. Leon	Carl J. Domino	George Steinbrenner	8.5F	1:50.00
1987	Medieval Victory	Steve Gaffalione	Richard R. Root	John C. Sessa	8.5F	1:48.60
1988	Silver Sunsets	Heberto Castillo Jr.	Luis Oliveres	Three G Stable	8.5F	1:48.20
1989	Shot Gun Scott	Walter Guerra	Ron Sarazin	Jean Friedberg & A. Scott Hamilton	8.5F	1:47.36
1990	Pro Flight	Walter Guerra	Greg Sanders	Ray and David Mueller	8.5F	1:48.20
1991	Naked Greed	José A. Vélez Jr.	Frank Gomez	Jill E. Robinson	8.5F	1:48.64
1992	Silver of Silver	Jacinto Vásquez	Stanley Shapoff	Chevalier Stable	8.5F	1:47.66
1993	Holy Bull	Mike E. Smith	Warren A. Croll Jr.	Warren A. Croll Jr.	8.5F	1:46.35
1994	Sea Emperor	Wigberto Ramos	Emanuel Tortora	James R. Lewis Jr.	8.5F	1:47.44
1995	Seacliff	René Douglas	William Kaplan	Ione & H. J. Elkins	8.5F	1:47.15
1996	His Honor	Ender Jimenez	David Vivian	Robert C. Roffey Jr.	8.5F	1:47.60
1997	Excellent Luck	Mark Guidry	Bobby Barnett	John Franks	8.5F	1:49.19
1998	Ten Pound Test	Javier Castellano	Steven Standridge	Heiligbrodt Racing Stable	8.5F	1:47.01
1999	Kiss A Native	Cornelio Velásquez	William P. White	John Franks	8.5F	1:44.52
2000	Express Tour	Julio Garcica	Martin Wolfson	A. Clare Silva Jr.	8.5F	1:45.12
2001	Booklet	Eibar Coa	Steve Klesaris	Philip Cohen, Marcia Cohen	8.5F	1:46.56
2002	Trust N' Luck	Cornelio Velásquez	Ralph Ziadie	E. Paul Robsham	8.5F	1:46.52
2003	Sir Oscar	Julio Garcia	Manuel Azpurua	International Fair Play, Inc.	8.5F	1:47.40
2004	B B Best	Eddie Castro	Edward Plesa Jr.	Bea Oxenberg & Laurie Plesa	8.5F	1:47.66
2005	Blazing Rate	Cecilio Penalba	Richard R. Root	Ralph Sessa	8.5F	1:47.45
2006	Green Vegas	Julio Garcia	Luis Olivares	Luis Olivares	8.5F	1:47.87
2007	Wise Answer	Eibar Coa	David Brownlee	J D Farms	8.5F	1:45.51
2008	Big Drama	Pascacio Lopez	David Fawkes	Harold L. Queen	8.5F	1:47.12
2009	Jackson Bend	Jeffery Sanchez	Stanley I. Gold	Jack or Better Farm, Inc.	8.5F	1:46.86
2010	Reprized Halo	Jose Alvarez	Manuel Azpurua	Roger Urbina	8.5F	1:50.50
2011	Fort Loudon	Luis Jurado	Stanley I. Gold	Jacks or Better Farm, Inc.	8.5F	1:48.29
2012	Speak Logistics	Angel Serpa	Edward Plesa Jr.	Ralph Nabavi	8.5F	1:47.79
2013	Best Plan Yet	Jeffrey Sanchez	Stanley I. Gold	Jacks or Better Farm, Inc.	8.5F	1:47.90
2014	Sing Praises	Ramsey Zimmerman	Stanley I. Gold	Jacks or Better Farm, Inc.	8.5F	1:45.79
2015	Fellowship	Jose C. Caraballo	Stanley I. Gold	Jacks or Better Farm, Inc.	8.5F	1:46.13
2016	Three Rules	Cornelio Velásquez	Jose M. Pinchin	Shade Tree Thoroughbreds	8.5F	1:44.63
2017	Soutache	Tyler Gaffalione	Ralph Nicks	GoldMark Farm	8.5F	1:45.10
2018	Well Defined	Carlos Montalvo	Kathleen O'Connell	Stonehedge, LLC	8.5F	1:44:97
2019	Chance It	Tyler Gaffalione	Saffie Joseph Jr.	Shooting Stars Thoroughbreds, LLC	8.5F	1:44:26
2020	Boca Boy	Edgard Zayas	Cheryl Winebaugh	Kenneth E. Fishbein	8.5F	1:46.34
2021	Octane	Emisael Jaramillo	Carlos A. David	Arindel Farm	8.5F	1:43.97

== Second Division winners ==
Year	Winner	Jockey	Trainer	Owner	Distance	Time
1983	Rexsons Hope	Robert Gaffglione	Harold Rose	Elsie Rose	8.5F	1:48.20
1986	Uncle Cam	Pat Day	Carl Domino	George Steinbrenner	8.5F	1:49.20
