= Stanley I. Gold =

American horse trainer (born 1947)

Stanley Gold
Personal information
- Born: August 8, 1947 (age 79) Passaic, New Jersey, USA
- Occupations: Accountant, horse trainer

Horse racing career
- Sport: Horse racing
- Career wins: 357 (as at June 30, 2018)

Major racing wins
- Calder Oaks (2006); Frances A. Genter Stakes (2006); Judy's Red Shoes Stakes (2006); Tampa Bay Downs Inaugural Stakes (2007); Pasco Stakes (2008); Affirmed Stakes (2009, 2011, 2014); Dr. Fager Stakes (2009, 2011, 2014); Frank Gomez Memorial Stakes (2009); In Reality Stakes (2009, 2011, 2013, 2014, 2015); J J's Dream Stakes (2010); Desert Vixen Stakes (2010, 2011, 2014); Susan's Girl Stakes (2010, 2015); My Dear Girl Stakes (2010, 2011); Carry Back Stakes (2012); Claiming Crown Rapid Transit Stakes (2014); Azalea Stakes (2015); Gulfstream Park Sprint Stakes (2015); Any Limit Stakes (2016); Hutcheson Stakes (2016); Swale Stakes (2016); Breeders' Cup wins: Breeders' Cup Juvenile Fillies (2010)

Significant horses
- Awesome Feather, Awesome Banner, Jackson Bend, Bayou's Lassie

Stanley I. Gold (born August 8, 1947, in Passaic, New Jersey) is a former Arthur Young & Co. accountant who left the professional services industry and became a champion trainer of Thoroughbred racehorses. In 2010 he won the Breeders' Cup Juvenile Fillies with Awesome Feather who would be voted that year's Eclipse Award for American Champion Two-Year-Old Filly.
