= Susan's Girl Stakes =

Thoroughbred horse race run in Florida

(Florida Sires) Susan's Girl Stakes
- Class: Restricted Black Type
- Location: Gulfstream Park; Hallandale Beach, Florida
- Inaugurated: 1982
- Race type: Thoroughbred – Flat racing
- Website: www.gulfstreampark.com

Race information
- Distance: 7 furlongs
- Surface: Dirt
- Track: left-handed
- Qualification: Two-year-old fillies
- Weight: Assigned
- Purse: US$200,000

The FTBOA Florida Sire Stakes Susan's Girl division is a thoroughbred horse race run annually at Gulfstream Park, in Hallandale Beach, Florida, for two-year-old fillies sired by FTBOA registered stallions at a distance of seven furlongs on dirt. It is part of the eleven-race Florida Thoroughbred Breeders' & Owners' Association (FTBOA) Florida Sire series of which seven races are hosted by Gulfstream Park and four by Tampa Bay Downs.

== History ==
Inaugurated at Calder Race Course in 1982, the race was part of Calder's Florida Stallion Stakes series through 2013 after which Calder's racing operations were leased to the Stronach Group, operators of Gulfstream Park.

Named in honor of U.S. Racing Hall of Fame inductee Susan's Girl, it is the second of the three Gulfstream Park FBTOA races exclusively for this specific age and gender group of registered Florida-breds who are from a Florida Sire Stakes eligible stallion. Run between the beginning of August and the end of September, the Susan's Girl Stakes follows the Desert Vixen Stakes at 6 furlongs and precedes the My Dear Girl Stakes at 1 1/16 miles (8.5 furlongs).

== Records ==
Speed record at Gulfstream Park:

- At 7 furlongs : 1:24.91 by Cajun Delta Dawn in 2016

Speed record at Calder:

- At 7 furlongs : 1:23.49 by Silk Concorde in 2000

Most wins by a jockey:

- 3 – Manoel Cruz (2002, 2005, 2006)
- 3 – Manuel Aguilar (2004, 2007, 2008)

Most wins by a trainer:

- 3- Stanley Gold (2018,2015,2010)
- 2 – Marvin Moncrief (1982, 1983)
- 2 – David A. Vivian (1995, 2004)
- 2 – Edward Plesa Jr. (1998, 2006)
- 2 – Kathleen O'Connell (2002, 2013)

Most wins by an owner:

- 2 – Dan R. Lasater (1982, 1983)
- 2 – Gilbert G. Campbell (2002, 2013)

== Winners ==
Gulfstream Park 2017–2018 Media Guide and race history:

Year	Winner	Jockey	Trainer	Owner	Dist. (F)	Time	Win$
2019	Ceci Valentina	Marcos Meneses	Ángel Rodríguez	Amalio Ruiz-Lozano	7 F	1:27.3	$120,000|-
2018	Cookie Dough	Jeffrey Sanchez	Stanley I. Gold	Arindel	7 F	1:24.46	$120,000|-
2017	Starship Bonita	Carlos Montalvo	Steven Dwoskin	Starship Stables	7 F	1:25.43	$120,000
2016	Cajun Delta Dawn	Juan Leyva	David J. Fawkes	Curtis G. Mikkelsen	7 F	1:24.91	$180,000
2015	Ballet Diva	Jose C. Caraballo	Stanley I. Gold	Jacks or Better Farm, Inc.	7 F	1:26.12	$180,000
2014	Holywell	Orlando Bocachica	Jose M. Pinchin	Tracy Pinchin	7 F	1:28.62	$150,000
2013	Scandalous Act	Antonio A. Gallardo	Kathleen O'Connell	Gilbert G. Campbell	7 F	1:25.06	$75,000
2012	Putyourdreamsaway	Juan Leyva	William A. Kaplan	Ione & Herb Elkins	7 F	1:26.52	$75,000
2010	Awesome Feather	Jeffrey Sanchez	Stanley I. Gold	Frank Stronach	7 F	1:24.57	$60,000
2009	Rosebud's Ridge	Cecilio Penalba	Herman Wilensky	Harold L. Queen	7 F	1:26.53	$90,000
2008	Aroma de Mujer	Manuel Aguilar	Walter Rosas-Canessa	Angel & Pedro Maestre	7 F	1:26.38	$90,000
2007	Silk Ridge	Manuel Aguilar	Gordon R. Potter	Karen D. Keen	7 F	1:24.61	$90,000
2006	AdhRhythm	Manoel Cruz	Edward Plesa Jr.	Centaur Farms	7 F	1:26.77	$90,000
2005	Running Lass	Manoel Cruz	Angel Salvias	Michael Sherman & William Condren	7 F	1:26.90	$75,000
2004	Aclassysassylassy	Manuel Aguilar	David A. Vivian	Barbara Vivian & Dominic Vitesse	7 F	1:27.74	$75,000
2003	French Village	Gary Boulanger	William P. White	Eugene & Laura Melnyk	7 F	1:25.91	$75,000
2002	Ivanavinalot	Manoel Cruz	Kathleen O'Connell	Gilbert G. Campbell	7 F	1:24.41	$75,000
2001	Bold World	Calvin Borel	Ronald J. Taylor	Hardacre Farm LLC	7 F	1:26.37	$75,000
2000	Silk Concorde	Eibar Coa	Ralph Ziadie	E. Paul Robsham	7 F	1:23.49	$75,000
1999	Sabre Dance	Eibar Coa	Dennis W. Ebert	Alan Drey	7 F	1:25.58	$75,000
1998	Three Ring	Cornelio Velásquez	Edward Plesa Jr.	Barry K. Schwartz	7 F	1:24.54	$75,000
1997	Nancy's Glitter	Pedro A. Rodriguez	Frederick O. Knibbs	Cecilia & Elbert R. Dixon	7 F	1:26.00	$75,000
1996	Dance For Thee	Eduardo O. Nunez	Leo A. Azpurua Jr.	Wilfredo J. Agusti	7 F	1:26.00	$75,000
1995	Plum Country	René Douglas	David A. Vivian	Dominic Vittese	7 F	1:25.20	$75,000
1994	Cottage Flower	Gary Boulanger	James E. Bracken	Kathy Jo Stable	7 F	1:26.44	$75,000
1993	Miss Gibson County	Abdiel Toribio	Martin D. Wolfson	Michael E. Pegram	7 F	1:24.40	$75,000
1992	Boots 'n Jackie	Michael Lee	Emanuel Tortora	Bee Bee Stables, Inc. &Toni Tortora	7 F	1:25.00	$75,000
1991	Subtle Dancer	Abdiel Toribio	Jose A. Mendez	Fred Berens & Sol Garazi	7 F	1:26.40	$90,000
1990	Z Flash Gun	Pedro A. Rodriguez	Duke Davis	Early Morning Farm/Robert Murphy Jr.	7 F	1:26.80	$90,000
1989	Stacie's Toy	Jorge F. Chavez	J. David Braddy	Joel W. Sainer	7 F	1:24.60	$90,000
1988	Sez Fourty	Jorge C. Duarte	Luis A. Olivares	Marissa Olivares & Three G Stable	7 F	1:25.80	$84,000
1987-1	Friendly Appeal	José A. Vélez Jr.	Thomas M. Cairns	Black Chip Stables	7 F	1:26.60	$45,000
1987-2	Crafty Wife	Mike Gonzalez	John J. Tammaro Jr.	Due Process Stable	7 F	1:26.60	$45,000
1986-1	Added Elegance	José A. Vélez Jr.	Frank Gomez	Wimborne Farm	7 F	1:25.00	$45,000
1986-2	Brave Raj	Pat Valenzuela	Melvin F. Stute	Dolly Green	7 F	1:25.00	$45,000
1985-1	Cascade	Julio Pezua	Manuel J. Azpurua	Fernando A. Isturiz	7 F	1:26.00	$48,000
1985-2	Opera Diva	Constantino Hernandez	Stanley M. Hough	Paul R. Denes	7 F	1:25.80	$48,000
1984-1	Stellana	Santiago Soto	George Gianos	Amelia & A. Talierco	7 F	1:26.00	$39,000
1984-2	Micki Bracken	Victor Molina	Estan Dominquez	Thoroughbred Breeders Corp.	7 F	1:26.80	$39,000
1983-1	Roughlon	Richard DePass	Marvin Moncrief	Dan R. Lasater	7 F	1:25.00	$36,000
1983-2	Scorched Panties	H. Dale Lynch	Nathan H. Kelly	Barbara & Nathan H. Kelly	7 F	1:25.60	$36,000
1982	Crystal Rail	Chuck Baltazar	Marvin Moncrief	Dan R. Lasater	6 F	1:12.80	$54,600
