= Affirmed Stakes (FS) =

Horse race held in Florida, U.S.

(Florida Sires) Affirmed Stakes
- Class: Restricted Black Type
- Location: Gulfstream Park; Hallandale Beach, Florida
- Inaugurated: 1982
- Race type: Thoroughbred – Flat racing

Race information
- Distance: 7-furlong sprint
- Surface: Dirt
- Track: left-handed
- Qualification: Two-years-old
- Weight: Assigned
- Purse: $200,000

The FTBOA Florida Sire Stakes Affirmed division is a thoroughbred horse race run annually as the third leg of the (FTBOA) Florida Sire stakes series. Inaugurated in 1983 at Calder Race Course as part of the Florida Stallion stakes series the race was named after the Florida-bred Triple Crown winner Affirmed, who was well known for his rivalry with the west coast-bred Alydar. The race was originally run at 6 furlongs but in its second year was increased to 7 furlongs in order to create a gradually increasing set of lengths throughout the series to allow the young horses to step up to each new length as they moved through their training. The Affirmed Stakes has run in two divisions on four separate occasions (1985–1987 and 2001). The race was discontinued at Calder Race Course in 2012 and taken over by Gulfstream Park in 2013.

== Records ==
Speed record: (at current distance of 7 furlongs)

- Soutache 2017 (1:22.46)

Most wins by a jockey:

- 3 – Gene St. Leon (1984, Div.2 – 1985, 1988)
- 3 – José A. Vélez Jr. (1983, 1990, 1991)

Most wins by a trainer:

- 4 – Frank Gomez (Div.2 – 1987, 1990, 1991, 2005)
- 3 - Stanley Gold (2014, 2011, 2009)

Most wins by an owner:

- 3 – Jacks or Better Farm, Inc. (2009, 2011, 2014)

== Winners ==
Gulfstream Park 2017–2018 Media Guide and race history:

Year	Winner	Jockey	Trainer	Owner	Dist. (F)	Time	Win$
2019	Liam's Lucky Charm	Reylu Gutierrez	Ralph Nicks	Stonehedge LLC	7 F	1:23.25	$120,000|-
2018	Garter and Tie	Emisael Jaramillo	Ralph Nicks	Jacks or Better Farm Inc.	7 F	1:23.06	$120,000|-
2017	Soutache	Eric Cancel	Ralph E. Nicks	GoldMark Farm	7 F	1:22.46	$120,000
2016	Three Rules	Cornelio Velásquez	Jose M. Pinchin	Shade Tree Thoroughbreds	7 F	1:23.89	$180,000
2015	Tribal Drama	Eddie Castro	David J. Fawkes	Hallmarc Racing	7 F	1:25.61	$180,000
2014	Twotwentyfive A	Abdiel Jaen	Stanley I. Gold	Jacks or Better Farm, Inc.	7 F	1:26.69	$75,000
2013	My Brown Eyed Guy	Antonio Gallardo	Kathleen O'Connell	Gilbert G. Campbell	7 F	1:24.87	$75,000
2012	D'nied Permission	Luis Saez	Joseph G. Calascibetta	Murro, Cheekes, Calascibetta	7 F	1:26.03	$75,000
2011	Fort Loudon	Luis Jurado	Stanley I. Gold	Jacks or Better Farm, Inc.	7 F	1:26.75	$75,000
2010	Gourmet Dinner	Sebastian Madrid	Peter Gulyas	Our Sugar Bear Stable	7 F	1:25.69	$60,000
2009	Jackson Bend	Jeffery Sanchez	Stanley I. Gold	Jacks or Better Farm, Inc.	7 F	1:25.19	$90,000
2008	Big Drama	Pascacio Lopez	David J. Fawkes	Harold L. Queen	7 F	1:24.71	$90,000
2007	Wise Answer	Ray Fuentes	David R. Brownlee	J. D. Farms	7 F	1:24.17	$90,000
2006	Straight Faced	Manoel Cruz	Stephen L. Dimauro	Walter R. Donnelly	7 F	1:26.03	$90,000
2005	In Summation	Manoel Cruz	Frank Gomez	Waterford Farm	7 F	1:24.87	$75,000
2004	Cin Cin	Abdiel Toribio	William P. White	The Posse	7 F	1:26.00	$75,000
2003	Sir Oscar	Julio A. Garcia	Manuel J. Azpurua	International Fair Play	7 F	1:25.69	$75,000
2002	Lawbook	Roger I. Velez	Thomas H. Heard Jr.	Thomas H. Heard Jr.	7 F	1:24.56	$75,000
2001-1	Bog Hunter	Eduardo O. Nunez	Debbie Thacker	Nelson Jones	7 F	1:26.52	$75,000
2001-2	Careys Gold	Roger Velez	Henry Collazo	Thompson Stables	7 F	1:26.16	$75,000
2000	Express Tour	Julio Garcia	Martin D. Wolfson	A. C. Silva	7 F	1:23.95	$75,000
1999	Snuck In	Robby Albarado	Steve Asmussen	Ackerly Brothers Farm	7 F	1:24.30	$75,000
1998	Sly Rajab	Jose A. Rivera II	J. David Braddy	Burton Butker	7 F	1:26.20	$75,000
1997	Halos And Horns	Gary Boulanger	Ralph Ziadie	Harold Kitchen	7 F	1:25.60	$75,000
1996	Blazing Sword	Abdiel Toribio	Kathleen O'Cconnell	Stonehedge Farm	7 F	1:24.60	$75,000
1995	Seacliff	René Douglas	William A. Kaplan	Ione & H. J. Elkins	7 F	1:24.60	$75,000
1994	Mecke	Gary Boulanger	Emanuel Tortora	James Lewis Jr.	7 F	1:25.86	$75,000
1993	Rustic Light	Michael Lee	Robert A. Hale	Silverbrook Farm, Inc	7 F	1:24.60	$75,000
1992	Fiery Special	Pedro A. Rodriguez	Jose A. Mendez	Fred Berens & Sol Garazi, Et.	7 F	1:24.60	$75,000
1991	Naked Greed	José Vélez Jr.	Frank Gomez	Jill E. Robinson	7 F	1:24.80	$90,000
1990	What A Cooker	José Vélez Jr.	Frank Gomez	Frances A. Genter Stable, Inc.	7 F	1:25.60	$90,000
1989	Shot Gun Scott	Walter Guerra	Ronald J. Sarazin	Jean Friedberg & A. Scott Hami	7 F	1:25.20	$90,000
1988	Valid Space	Gene St. Leon	Richard R. Root	Harry T. Mangurian Jr.	7 F	1:25.20	$84,000
1987-1	Medieval Victory	Steve Gaffglione	Antonio Arcodia	John C. Sessa	7 F	1:25.60	$45,000
1987-2	In The Slammer	Mike A. Gonzalez	Frank Gomez	Mary & W. Vaught	7 F	1:24.60	$45,000
1986-1	Baldskis Star	Jorge C. Duarte	Manuel A. Estevez	Five Star Stable	7 F	1:25.20	$45,000
1986-2	Northstar Prospect	Julio Espinoza	Manuel A. Estevez	Five Star Stable	7 F	1:24.80	$45,000
1985-1	Tough Talk	Juan Santiago	William J. Cesare	Walt Nazarenko	7 F	1:26.00	$48,000
1985-2	Princely Lad	Gene St. Leon	J. Fieselman	Ace of Hearts Stable	7 F	1:26.20	$48,000
1984	Smile	Gene St. Leon	Flint S. Schulhofer	Frances A. Genter	7 F	1:24.60	$72,000
1983	A London Fog	José Vélez Jr.	Curtis N. Spencer	Celestino Dilibero	7 F	1:26.20	$68,400
1983	El Kaiser	Chuck Baltazar	Larry Lyons	Pony Horse Stable	6 F	1:12.00	$54,600
