= Inside Information Stakes =

- Class: Grade II
- Location: Gulfstream Park; Hallandale Beach, Florida, United States
- Inaugurated: 1976 (as Shirley Jones Stakes)
- Race type: Thoroughbred – Flat racing
- Website: Gulfstream Park

Race information
- Distance: 7 furlongs
- Surface: Dirt
- Track: left-handed
- Qualification: Fillies and mares, four-years-old & older
- Weight: 123 lbs. with allowances
- Purse: US$200,000 (since 2014)

The Inside Information Stakes is a Grade II American Thoroughbred horse race for fillies and mares that are four years old or older, over a distance of seven furlongs on the dirt held annually in late January at Gulfstream Park in Hallandale Beach, Florida. The event currently carries a purse of $200,000.

== History ==
The inaugural running of the event was on 21 April 1976 as the Shirley Jones Stakes over a distance of 1 1/16 miles on the turf track for fillies and mares that were three-year-olds or older. It was won by Roger E. Leslie's Canadian-bred Regal Quillo who started as the 11/10 favorite winning by 1 3/4 lengths. The event was named after the fine mare Shirley Jones who defeated her male counterparts in the inaugural running of the Pan American Handicap at Gulfstream Park in 1962.

During the 1970s the legal inflighting between owner Donn family's Gulfstream Park and John W. Galbreath's Hialeah Park over racing date allotments impacted the scheduling of the event. The event was not held in 1977 or 1978. In 1979 the event was scheduled as a race for three-year-old fillies over a distance of six furlongs on the dirt track. The race was a spectacular clash between two brilliant fillies, Candy Eclair and Davona Dale which Candy Eclair won her seventh straight race to remain undefeated by a 1 3/4 lengths in a scintillating 1:08 3/5.

Again in 1980 the event was not scheduled but in 1981 the event resumed as a seven furlong sprint for fillies and mares that are four years old or older and has currently remains as such.

In 1983, the event was held in two split divisions with both favorites Meringue Pie and Secrettame winning their races.

The event was upgraded in 1998 by the American Graded Stakes Committee to Grade III race. The event was upgraded to Grade II classification in 2005.

In 2009 the event was renamed to the Inside Information Stakes in honor of the U.S. Racing Hall of Fame racing mare Inside Information, winner of the 1995 Breeders' Cup Distaff who was voted that year's American Champion Older Female Horse. Inside Information ran three times at Gulfstream Park winning twice including the Grade II Bonnie Miss Stakes.

In the 2011 running of the event 3/5 odds-on favorite Hilda's Passion set a new track record for the 7 furlongs distance in her 5 1/4 lengths defeat of five other runners.

== Records ==
Speed record:

- 7 furlongs: 1:20.45 – Hilda's Passion (2011)

Margins:

- 7 1/4 lengths – Randaroo (2004)

Most wins:

- 2 – Love's Exchange (1990, 1991)

Most wins by a jockey:

- 6 – John Velazquez (2000, 2003, 2004, 2009, 2017, 2021)

Most wins by a trainer:

- 5 – Todd A. Pletcher (2000, 2003, 2009, 2011, 2018)

Most wins by an owner:

- 2 – Frances A. Genter (1988, 1993)
- 2 – J. Mack Robinson (1990, 1991)
- 2 – Eugene Melnyk (2000, 2003)

== Winners ==
Year	Winner	Age	Jockey	Trainer	Owner	Distance	Time	Purse	Grade	Ref
Inside Information Stakes
2026	Grand Job	5	Junior Alvarado	William I. Mott	Bell Tower Thoroughbreds & Medallion Racing	7 furlongs	1:21.41	$200,000	II	
2025	Mystic Lake	4	Irad Ortiz Jr.	Saffie A. Joseph Jr.	C2 Racing Stable & Stefania Farms	7 furlongs	1:22.59	$208,000	II	
2024	Olivia Darling	4	Irad Ortiz Jr.	Jorge Delgado	Amo Racing USA	7 furlongs	1:23.04	$210,000	II	
2023	Maryquitecontrary	4	Luca Panici	Joseph Catanese III	Rodney G. Lundock	7 furlongs	1:23.64	$200,000	II	
2022	Just One Time	4	Joel Rosario	Brad H. Cox	Warriors Reward & Commonwealth New Era Racing	7 furlongs	1:23.81	$200,000	II	
2021	Pacific Gale	5	John R. Velazquez	John C. Kimmel	Tobey L. Morton	7 furlongs	1:22.60	$200,000	II	
2020	Pink Sands	5	Jose L. Ortiz	Claude R. McGaughey III	Gainesway Stable & Andrew Rosen	7 furlongs	1:23.42	$200,000	II	
2019	America's Tale	4	Paco Lopez	Bernard S. Flint	Naveed Chowhan	7 furlongs	1:24.08	$200,000	II	
2018	Ivy Bell	5	Javier Castellano	Todd A. Pletcher	Mathis Stable & Madaket Stables	7 furlongs	1:23.29	$200,000	II	
2017	Distanta	5	John R. Velazquez	Victor Barboza Jr.	Veb Racing Stable	7 furlongs	1:23.93	$200,000	II	
2016	Stonetastic	5	Paco Lopez	Kelly J. Breen	Stoneway Farm	7 furlongs	1:23.22	$200,000	II	
2015	Classic Point	6	Paco Lopez	James A. Jerkens	Joseph V. Shields Jr.	7 furlongs	1:24.47	$200,000	II	
2014	Heart Stealer	4	Joel Rosario	Martin D. Wolfson	Peachtree Stable	7 furlongs	1:22.57	$200,000	II	
2013	Aubby K	4	Edgar S. Prado	Ralph E. Nicks	James C. Spence	7 furlongs	1:23.85	$150,000	II	
2012	Musical Romance	5	Juan C. Leyva	William A. Kaplan	Pinnacle Racing Stable & William A. Kaplan	7 furlongs	1:21.88	$150,000	II	
2011	Hilda's Passion	4	Javier Castellano	Todd A. Pletcher	Starlight Partners	7 furlongs	1:20.45	$150,000	II	
2010	Warbling	4	Julien R. Leparoux	Eddie Kenneally	Joseph W. Sutton	7 furlongs	1:21.92	$200,000	II	
2009	Game Face	4	John R. Velazquez	Todd A. Pletcher	Zabeel Racing International	7 furlongs	1:22.09	$150,000	II	
Shirley Jones Handicap
2008	Sugar Swirl	5	Javier Castellano	Brian A. Lynch	Frank Stronach	7 furlongs	1:22.57	$170,000	II	
2007	Sweet Fervor	4	Fernando Jara	William I. Mott	Kinsman Stable	7 furlongs	1:22.67	$200,000	II	
2006	Splendid Blended	4	Manoel R. Cruz	William I. Mott	Peter Vegso	7 furlongs	1:21.62	$200,000	II	
2005	Madcap Escapade	4	Jerry D. Bailey	Frank L. Brothers	Bruce Lunsford	7 furlongs	1:22.06	$150,000	II	
2004	Randaroo	4	John R. Velazquez	Kiaran P. McLaughlin	H. Joseph Allen	7 furlongs	1:21.42	$100,000	III	
2003	Harmony Lodge	5	John R. Velazquez	Todd A. Pletcher	Eugene & Laura Melnyk	7 furlongs	1:22.35	$100,000	III	
2002	Cat Cay	5	Pat Day	Claude R. McGaughey III	Ogden Phipps	7 furlongs	1:22.31	$100,000	III	
2001	Hidden Assets	4	Jerry D. Bailey	Bernard S. Flint	Richard, Bertram & Elaine Klein	7 furlongs	1:22.40	$100,000	III	
2000	Marley Vale	4	John R. Velazquez	Todd A. Pletcher	Eugene Melnyk	7 furlongs	1:22.24	$100,000	III	
1999	Harpia	5	Richard Migliore	John C. Kimmel	Juddmonte Farms	7 furlongs	1:22.17	$100,000	III	
1998	U Can Do It	5	Shane Sellers	Larry Pilotti	Frank & Carina Marano	7 furlongs	1:23.33	$100,000	III	
1997	Chip	4	Joe Bravo	Sonny Hine	Carolyn Hine	7 furlongs	1:22.24	$100,000	III	
1996	Dust Bucket	5	Robbie Davis	William H. Turner Jr.	Milton Ritzenberg	7 furlongs	1:25.97	$100,000	III	
1995	Educated Risk	5	Mike E. Smith	Claude R. McGaughey III	Ogden Mills Phipps	7 furlongs	1:22.94	$100,000	III	
1994	Santa Catalina	6	Pat Day	Mark A. Hennig	Team Valor	7 furlongs	1:21.94	$100,000	III	
1993	Jeano	5	Shane Sellers	Carl A. Nafzger	Frances A. Genter	7 furlongs	1:23.56	$65,100	III	
1992	Nannerl	5	Julie Krone	Flint S. Schulhofer	Marablue Farm	7 furlongs	1:23.23	$61,000	III	
1991	Love's Exchange	5	Heberto Castillo Jr.	Frank Gomez	J. Mack Robinson	7 furlongs	1:23.20	$59,700	III	
1990	Love's Exchange	4	Earlie Fires	Frank Gomez	J. Mack Robinson	7 furlongs	1:23.60	$61,500	III	
1989	Social Pro	4	Jorge F. Chavez	Emanuel Tortora	Nick Kayal	7 furlongs	1:23.60	$59,400	III	
1988	Tappiano	4	Jean Cruguet	Flint S. Schulhofer	Frances A. Genter	7 furlongs	1:23.00	$89,750	III	
1987	Life At the Top	4	Randy Romero	D. Wayne Lukas	Eugene V. Klein & Lloyd R. French Jr.	7 furlongs	1:22.80	$59,400		
1986	Soli	4	Jerry D. Bailey	Woodford C. Stephens	Jayeff-B Stable	7 furlongs	1:23.80	$65,650		
1985	Mickey's Echo	6	Walter Guerra	Claude R. McGaughey III	Warner L. Jones Jr.	7 furlongs	1:23.60	$61,850		
1984	Chic Belle	4	Craig Perret	Jimmy Croll	Aisco Stable	7 furlongs	1:22.80	$42,630		
1983	Meringue Pie	5	Jorge Velasquez	Charles Peoples	Bayard Sharp	7 furlongs	1:23.60	$41,195		Division 1
1983	Secrettame	5	Jacinto Vasquez	Bruce Johnstone	Audrey Reed	7 furlongs	1:24.20	$41,930		Division 2
1982	Bushmaid	4	Jerry D. Bailey	Harvey L. Vanier	Susan B. Fisher	7 furlongs	1:23.20	$32,450		
1981	Sober Jig	4	J. Paul Souter	John Starr	Jean-Louis Levesque	7 furlongs	1:23.20	$45,255		
1980	Race not held									
Shirley Jones Stakes
1979	Candy Eclair	3	Anthony S. Black	S. Allen King	Adele W. Paxson	6 furlongs	1:08.60	$28,200		
1977–1978		Race not held								
1976	Regal Quillo	3	Chuck Baltazar	Andrew Smithers	Roger E. Leslie	1 1/16 miles	1:42.20	$17,000		

Legend:
Turf Dirt

== See also ==
- List of American and Canadian Graded races
