= Carry Back Stakes =

Horse race in Florida, US

- Class: Listed
- Location: Gulfstream Park; Hallandale, Florida, United States; Moved in 2015 from Calder Race Course to Gulfstream.
- Inaugurated: 1975
- Race type: Thoroughbred – Flat racing
- Website: www.gulfstreampark.com

Race information
- Distance: 7 furlong sprint
- Surface: Dirt
- Track: left-handed
- Qualification: Three-years-old
- Weight: Assigned
- Purse: $150,000 (since 2012)

The Carry Back Stakes is an American Thoroughbred horse race once run annually at Calder Race Course in Miami Gardens, Florida, but now run at Gulfstream Park after negotiations between the two tracks.

Contested during the first part of July, the race is open to three-year-old horses willing to race seven furlongs on the dirt. A Listed event, it currently offers a purse of $150,000.

This race is named in honor of the Florida-bred 1961 American Champion Three-Year-Old Male Horse, Carry Back whose wins included the 1961 Flamingo Stakes and Florida Derby, as well as that year's Kentucky Derby and Preakness Stakes. Carry Back was inducted in the United States Racing Hall of Fame in 1975.

Inaugurated in 1975 as a race for two-year-old horses, in 1979 it was changed to a race for horses aged three and older. Since 1980 it has been restricted to three-year-olds and from 1981 to 1993 was run as the Carry Back Handicap. Since inception it has been contested at a variety of distances:

- 5 1/2 furlongs : 1975–1978
- 6 furlongs : 1980–1982, 1997 to 2013
- 6 1/2 furlongs : 1991
- 7 furlongs : 1979, 1992–1996, 2015 to present

== Records ==
Speed record:

- at 6 furlongs – 1:09.30 – Lost in the Fog (2005)
- at 7 furlongs – 1:22.09 – Rated R. Superstar (2016)

Most wins by a jockey:

- 3 – Eibar Coa (1997, 1998, 1999)

Most wins by a trainer:

- 3 – Frank Gomez (1979, 1985, 1988)
- 3 – Manuel Azpurua (1983, 1996, 2004)

Most wins by an owner:

- 2 – Harry T. Mangurian Jr. (1981, 1982)

== Winners of the Carry Back Stakes since 1975 ==
Year	Winner	Jockey	Trainer	Owner	Distance	Time	Grade
2017	Three Rules	Cornelio H. Velasquez	Jose Pinchin	Shade Tree Thoroughbreds, Inc.	7 fur.	1:22.63	III
2016	Rated R. Superstar	Cornelio H. Velasquez	Kenneth G. McPeek	Radar Racing	7 fur.	1:22.09	III
2015	Grand Bili	Javier Castellano	Gustavo Delgado	Groupo 7C Racing Stable	7 fur.	1:22.11	III
2014	no race						
2013	Mico Margarita	Ricardo Santana Jr.	Steve Asmussen	J. Kirk & Judy Robison	6 fur.	1:10.97	III
2011	Indiano	Gabriel Saez	Martin D. Wolfson	Diamond A Racing	6 fur.	1:10.60	II
2010	Coffee Boy	Jermaine V. Bridgmohan	Martin D. Wolfson	Gary Barber	6 fur.	1:11.55	II
2009	Not for Silver	Jose Lezcano	Michael Trombetta	Ted Julio	6 fur.	1:11.91	II
2008	Golden Spikes	Elvis Trujillo	Martin D. Wolfson	M375 Thoroughbreds et al.	6 fur.	1:11.20	II
2007	Black Seventeen	Clinton Potts	Brian Koriner	Wind River Stables et al.	6 fur.	1:09.84	II
2006	Too Much Bling	Edgar Prado	Bob Baffert	Stonerside/Blazing Meadows	6 fur.	1:10.48	II
2005	Lost in the Fog	Russell Baze	Greg Gilchrist	Harry J. Aleo	6 fur.	1:09.30	II
2004	Weigelia	Aurelio Toribio Jr.	Manuel Azpurua	Joseph J. Balsamo	6 fur.	1:10.50	III
2003	Valid Video	Joe Bravo	Dennis Manning	Paul Tinkle	6 fur.	1:10.15	III
2002	Royal Lad	Jerry Bailey	Kirk Ziadie	Ron & Cindy Stengel	6 fur.	1:10.73	
2001	Illusioned	Jorge Chavez	William I. Mott	Kinsman Stable	6 fur.	1:11.08	
2000	Caller One	Corey Nakatani	James Chapman	Carolyn Chapman	6 fur.	1:10.35	
1999	Silver Season	Eibar Coa	Mohammed Moubarak	Buckram Oak Farm	6 fur.	1:11.32	
1998	Mint	Eibar Coa	Mohammed Moubarak	Diamond Studs	6 fur.	1:11.20	
1997	Renteria	Eibar Coa	Jerry Dutton	J. Dutton / L. Harrington	6 fur.	1:11.20	
1996	Fortunate Review	Aurelio Toribio Jr.	Manuel Azpurua	S G Stable	7 fur.	1:23.20	
1995	Sonic Signal	René Douglas	James E. Bracken	Kathy Jo Stable	7 fur.	1:24.60	
1994	Score A Birdie	Heberto Castillo Jr.	Edward Plesa Jr.	John C. Sessa	7 fur.	1:24.00	
1993	Humbugaboo	Mary Russ	George Gianos	Edie & George Gianos	7 fur.	1:22.60	
1992	Always Silver	Michael A. Lee	Emanuel Tortora	James Lewis Jr.	7 fur.	1:25.00	
1991	Ocala Flame	Robert Lester	Emanuel Tortora	Toni Tortora	6.5 fur.	1:19.00	
1990	Country Isle	Heberto Castillo Jr.	J. Provost	Valiant Stable	7 fur.	1:24.80	
1989	Big Stanley	Douglas Valiente	George Gianos	Lusararian, Inc.	7 fur.	1:23.60	
1988	In The Slammer	Mike Gonzalez	Frank Gomez	Mary & Wayne Vaught	7 fur.	1:23.80	
1987	You're No Bargain	Omar Londono	James E. Bracken	Roy Bowen/A. B. Hancock III	7 fur.	1:25.60	
1986	Kid Colin	Gene St. Leon	Frank A. Alexander	B. K. Schwartz	7 fur.	1:25.80	
1985	Smile	Jacinto Vásquez	Frank Gomez	Frances A. Genter	7 fur.	1:23.80	
1984	Bowmans Express	Omar Londono	R. Felix	Devonshire Farms	7 fur.	1:25.40	
1983	Opening Lead	B. Gonzalez	Manuel Azpurua	Brad D. Gay	7 fur.	1:25.80	
1982	Rex's Profile	Ernest Cardone	Richard Root	Harry T. Mangurian Jr.	6 fur.	1:11.40	
1981	Face the Moment	Ernest Cardone	Richard Root	Harry T. Mangurian Jr.	6 fur.	1:11.00	
1980	Diplomatic Note	Jerry Bailey	Ben Perkins Jr.	Daddario & King	6 fur.	1:12.00	
1979	Breezy Fire	Miguel A. Rivera	Frank Gomez	Ivanhoe Stable	7 fur.	1:24.60	
1978	Admiral Rix	Tommy Barrow	A. Perez	M. E. Decola	5.5 fur.	1:07.40	
1977	Chwesboken	D. Hidalgo	G. Julian	Quality Hill Stable	5.5 fur.	1:05.40	
1976	Winner's Hit	Ray Broussard	Merritt A. Buxton	L. D. Plate	5.5 fur.	1:07.00	
1975	Precipitory	Jorge Salinas	Ronald J. Sarazin	Ralph Sessa	5.5 fur.	1:06.80	
