= Gene St. Leon =

Personal information
- Born: c. 1955 Hutchinson, Kansas
- Occupation: Jockey

Horse racing career
- Sport: Horse racing
- Career wins: 2,499

Major racing wins
- Demoiselle Stakes (1971); New Orleans Handicap (1972); Memorial Day Handicap (1974, 1975, 1977, 1988); Azalea Stakes (1975, 1976); W. L. McKnight Handicap (1975, 1976); Calder Derby (1973); Juvenile Stakes (1981); Desert Vixen Stakes (1983); Melaleuca Stakes (1984) (2 divs); Miami Beach Handicap (1984); My Charmer Handicap (1984, 1986); Affirmed Stakes (1984, 1985, 1988); Black Helen Handicap (1986); Delaware Handicap (1986); John A. Morris Handicap (1986); Carry Back Stakes (1986); Tropical Turf Handicap (1986); Alabama Derby (1987); Arlington Classic (1987; Illinois Derby (1987); Ohio Derby (1987); Gulfstream Park Turf Handicap (1988); Royal Palm Handicap (1988); Miami Mile Handicap (1991)

Racing awards
- Eclipse Award for Outstanding Apprentice Jockey (1971); Leading jockey at Calder Race Course (1973, 1976)

Honours
- Calder Race Course Hall of Fame (1995)

Significant horses
- Lost Code, Smile, Shocker T., Salem Drive, Toonerville, Rilial, Draw In, Billie Osage, Lil E. Tee (Maiden Win)

Gene St. Leon (born c. 1955 in Hutchinson, Kansas) is a retired Champion jockey in American Thoroughbred horse racing.

In 1971 he was among the recipients of the newly created Eclipse Award program when he was voted that year's Outstanding Apprentice Jockey. He was inducted in Calder Race Course Hall of Fame in 1995. During his career he won a record 1,310 races at Calder, a record that stood until it was broken in June 2009 by Eduardo Nunez. St. Leon still holds the Calder record for stakes race wins at 73.

On February 7, 1976, St. Leon rode Toonerville to a world record time of 1:51 2/5 for one and three sixteenth miles on turf in winning the second division of the Bougainvillea Handicap at Hialeah Park Race Track.

Gene St. Leon retired from race riding in 1989. He made a comeback in 1991 through 1994 and in 1999.
