= Bougainvillea Handicap =

- Class: Discontinued Grade 3 stakes
- Location: Hialeah Park; Hialeah, Florida
- Inaugurated: 1940
- Race type: Thoroughbred – Flat racing

Race information
- Distance: 1⅛ miles (9 furlongs)
- Surface: Turf
- Track: Left-handed
- Qualification: Three years old & up
- Purse: US$100,000

The Bougainvillea Handicap was a Thoroughbred horse race run between 1940 and 2001 at Hialeah Park in Hialeah, Florida. A race for horses age three and older, it was run at a distance of 1 1/8 miles on turf. The race was named for the purple bougainvillea flower which is an integral part of the track's floral blueprint.

== History ==
The inaugural running in 1940 was won by William F. Mannagh's Liberty Flight. Sent off by the betting public at odds of more than 10:1, he was the longshot of the seven starters. In a rare occurrence, the second-place finisher High One had the second longest odds and third-place finisher Dunade had the third longest odds. Armor Bearer, the betting favorite, finished last.

In 1964, Parka set a new course record of 1:53 4/5 in winning the Bougainvillea Handicap. He returned to Hialeah the following year to win the race again in exactly the same time.

In 1970, Secretariat's Hall of Fame jockey Ron Turcotte aboard Vent du Nord became the only jockey to ever win the "Hialeah Turf Series", three races consisting of the Palm Beach, Bougainvillea and Hialeah Turf Cup Handicaps.

In 1973 the Graded stakes race system was recorded for the first time in the United States. The February 10, 1973 edition of the Bougainvillea Handicap was awarded Grade 2 status. This historical event was won by Gleaming, owned by the renowned Calumet Farm of Lexington, Kentucky.

The final running of the Bougainville Handicap took place on March 31, 2001 and was won by Make No Mistake, owned by Walter Haefner's Moyglare Stud Farm.

== Records ==
Speed record:

- 1:46.04 @ 1 1/8 miles : Signal Tap (1996)
- 1:51 4/5 @ 1 3/16 miles : Toonerville (1976)

Most wins:

- 2 – Frere Jacques (1947, 1949)
- 2 – Chicle (1950, 1951)
- 2 – Parka (1964, 1965)
- 2 – London Company (1974, 1975)
- 2 – Flying Pidgeon (1985, 1986)
- 2 – Sharp Appeal (1997, 1998)

Most wins by a jockey:

- 4 – Ángel Cordero Jr. (1971, 1973, 1974, 1978)
- 4 – José A. Santos ( 1985, 1986, 1997, 2001)

Most wins by a trainer:

- 3 – LeRoy Jolley (1974, 1975, 1983) (Note: subject to change due to 4 missing names)

Most wins by an owner:

- 2 – Jacob Sher (1947, 1949)
- 2 – Palatine Stable (Frank Rosen) (1950, 1951)
- 2 – Hasty House Farm (1956, 1958)
- 2 – Pelican Stable (Rachel Carpenter) (1964, 1965)
- 2 – Calumet Farm (1966, 1973)
- 2 – Chance Hill Farm (1974, 1975)
- 2 – Constance Daparma / Armand Marcanthony (1985, 1986)
- 2 – Martin L. Cherry (1997, 1998)

== Winners ==
Year	Winner	Age	Jockey	Trainer	Owner	Dist. (Miles)	Time	Gr
2001	Make No Mistake	6	José A. Santos	Christophe Clement	Moyglare Stud Farm, Ltd.	11/8 M	1:50.10	3
2000	Down The Aisle	7	Javier Castellano	William I. Mott	Albert Coppola Sr. / Charles H. Deters	11/8 M	1:49.46	3
1999	Parade Ground	4	Pat Day	Neil J. Howard	William S. Farish III / Stephen C. Hilbert	11/8 M	1:47.04	3
1998	Sharp Appeal	5	Herb McCauley	Martin D. Wolfson	Martin L. Cherry	11/8 M	1:46.40	3
1997	Sharp Appeal	4	José A. Santos	Martin D. Wolfson	Martin L. Cherry	11/8 M	1:47.95	3
1996	Signal Tap	5	John Velazquez	Scotty Schulhofer	Centennial Farms	11/8 M	1:46.04	3
1995	Lassigny	4	Jerry Bailey	William I. Mott	Prince Sultan al Kabeer	11/8 M	1:47.92	3
1994	Awad	4	Eddie Maple	David Donk	Ryehill Farm (James P. Ryan)	13/16 M	1:53.60	3
1993	Carterista	4	Carlos Lopez Sr.	Ronald B. Spatz	S. A. of South Florida, Inc.	13/16 M	1:54.81	
1992	Race not held							
1991	Buckhar	3	Jean Cruguet	Willard C. Freeman	John W. Meriwether	13/16 M	1:54.80	
1990	Race not held							
1989	Forlitano	8	Corey Black	Thomas J. Skiffington	Evergreen Farm	13/16 M	1:53.80	2
1988	Salem Drive	6	Gene St. Leon	Richard J. Lundy	Virginia Kraft Payson	13/16 M	1:56.40	2
1987	Akabir	5	Jerry Bailey	Thomas J. Skiffington	Minnesota Sunrise Stable	13/16 M	1:54.00	2
1986	Flying Pidgeon	5	José A. Santos	Luis Olivares	Constance Daparma / Armand Marcanthony	13/16 M	1:53.20	2
1985-1	Pass The Line	4	Alexis Solis	Carl Domino	Stanley Ersoff	13/16 M	1:53.20	2
1985-2	Flying Pidgeon	4	José A. Santos	Luis Olivares	Constance Daparma / Armand Marcanthony	13/16 M	1:53.60	2
1984	Four Bases	5	Alex Solis	Gilberto Puentes	Murray M. Garren	13/16 M	1:52.40	2
1983-1	Nijinsky's Secret	5	José A. Vélez Jr.	Kent H. Stirling	Mrs. Bud. McDougald	13/16 M	1:52.80	2
1983-2	Lamerok	4	Jacinto Vásquez	LeRoy Jolley	Peter M. Brant	13/16 M	1:53.00	2
1982	Gleaming Channel	4	Mike Lee	Reed Combest	Mitchell Wolfson	13/16 M	1:52.00	2
1981	Spence Bay	6	Octavio Vergara	Neal Winick	N. B. Hunt / Summa Stable	13/16 M	1:53.00	3
1980	Premier Ministre	4	Ramon Encinas	Angel Penna Sr.	Daniel Wildenstein	13/16 M	1:54.20	3
1979	Scythian Gold	4	Jean Cruguet	Victor Morgan	Mary Zimmerman	13/16 M	1:53.20	2
1978	Noble Dancer	6	Ángel Cordero Jr.	Tommy Kelly	Haakon Fretheim	13/16 M	1:52.60	2
1977	All Friends	5	Earlie Fires	Arthur Hoffman	Marvin L. Warner	13/16 M	1:52.80	2
1976-1	Sea Lawyer	6	Gerland Gallitano	Kenneth O. Kemp	Shore View Farm Stable	13/16 M	1:52.40	2
1976-2	Toonerville	5	Gene St. Leon	Norman St. Leon	Norman St. Leon, et al.	13/16 M	1:51.80	2
1975-1	Snurb	7	Gene St. Leon	Reed Combest	B.L.T. Stable	13/16 M	1:53.60	2
1975-2	London Company	5	Marco Castaneda	LeRoy Jolley	Chance Hill Farm	13/16 M	1:53.00	2
1974	London Company	4	Ángel Cordero Jr.	LeRoy Jolley	Chance Hill Farm	13/16 M	1:52.80	2
1973	Gleaming	5	Ángel Cordero Jr.	Reggie Cornell	Calumet Farm	13/16 M	1:54.40	2
1972	Star Envoy	4	Jacinto Vásquez	Everett W. King	Lloyd I. Miller	13/16 M	1:52.60	
1971-1	Shelter Bay	5	Robert Woodhouse	Scotty Schulhofer	Tartan Stable	13/16 M	1:54.00	
1971-2	More The Merrier	5	Ángel Cordero Jr.	John H. Rigione	Samuel H. Klein & Sarkis R. Davitian	13/16 M	1:54.00	
1970-1	Great Cohoes	5	Eddie Belmonte	Arnold N. Winick	Maribel G. Blum	13/16 M	1:54.40	
1970-2	Vent du Nord	5	Ron Turcotte	Alfred A. Scotti	Emanuel Mittman	13/16 M	1:53.80	
1969	Fort Marcy	5	Manuel Ycaza	J. Elliott Burch	Rokeby Stable	13/16 M	2:03.00	
1968	Flit-To	5	John L. Rotz	James P. Conway	Robert Lehman	13/16 M	1:55.20	
1967	Tequillo	4	Jorge Velásquez	Raymond F. Metcalf	Paul L. Benshoof	13/16 M	1:57.60	
1966	Kentucky Jug †	5	William Boland	Horace A. Jones	Calumet Farm	13/16 M	1:54.80	
1966	Lord Date †	5	Calvin Stone	Frank H. Merrill Jr.	North Star Ranch	13/16 M	1:54.80	
1965	Parka	7	John L. Rotz	Warren A. Croll Jr.	Pelican Stable (Rachel Carpenter)	13/16 M	1:53.80	
1964	Parka	6	Wayne Chambers	Warren A. Croll Jr.	Pelican Stable (Rachel Carpenter)	13/16 M	1:53.80	
1963	Bronze Babu	5	Herb Hinojosa	Frank Y. Whiteley Jr.	Mrs. Ephraim Winer	13/16 M	1:56.00	
1962	Eurasia	6	Bill Hartack	Frank J. McManus	Greentree Stable	13/16 M	1:56.80	
1961	Wolfram	5	John L. Rotz	Burley E. Parke	Harbor View Farm	13/16 M	1:56.20	
1960	Noble Sel	4	George Gibb	W. R. "Bob" White	Dr. Frank J. Recio	13/16 M	1:56.80	
1959	General Arthur	5	Jack Leonard	James W. Smith	Brae Burn Farm	13/16 M	1:59.80	
1958	Stephanotis	5	Bill Hartack	Harry Trotsek	Hasty House Farm	13/16 M	1:59.00	
1957	Espea	4	Robert Martin	Eugene Jacobs	Jaclyn Stable	13/16 M	1:57.60	
1956	Summer Solstice	4	John Adams	Harry Trotsek	Hasty House Farm	13/16 M	1:59.20	
1955	Cascanuez	7	Bobby Ussery	Robert B. Odom	Charfran Stable	13/16 M	1:56.00	
1954	Parnassus	4	Chris Rogers	Willard C. Freeman	John S. Phipps	13/16 M	1:55.40	
1953	Iceberg	5	Jorge Contreras	Horatio Luro	W. Arnold Hanger	13/16 M	1:57.60	
1952	Picador	5	Ronnie Nash	Preston M. Burch	Brookmeade Stable	13/16 M	1:56.80	
1951	Chicle II	6	Hedley Woodhouse	Joseph H. Pierce Sr.	Palatine Stable (Frank Rosen)	13/16 M	1:58.20	
1950	Chicle II	5	Hedley Woodhouse	Joseph H. Pierce Sr.	Palatine Stable (Frank Rosen)	13/16 M	1:56.00	
1949	Frere Jacques	7	Douglas Dodson	L. Harry Silver	Jacob Sher	13/16 M	1:57.20	
1948	Master Bid	5	Henri Mora	Marion Barton	Perne L. Grissom	13/16 M	2:01.00	
1947	Frere Jacques	5	Ted Atkinson	Marion McGonigle	Jacob Sher	13/16 M	1:57.40	
1946	Cat Bridge	4	Porter Roberts	Richard "Whitey" Nixon	George R. Watkins	13/16 M	1:56.60	
1943	– 1945	Race not held						
1942	Signator	4	William Strickler	Ross O. Higdon	Woolford Farm	3/4 M	1:12.20	
1941	Potranco	4	Irving Anderson	Alexis G. Wilson	Lexbrook Stable (M. A. & L. D. Kern)	3/4 M	1:11.60	
1940	Liberty Flight	5	Willie Lee Johnson	D. W. Carroll	W. F. Mannagh	3/4 M	1:10.60	

- † 1966 – Kentucky Jug and Lord Date ran a dead heat for first.
