= Smile Sprint Stakes =

- Class: Listed
- Location: Gulfstream Park; Hallandale, Florida, United States
- Inaugurated: 1984 (at Calder Race Course as Miami Beach Handicap)
- Race type: Thoroughbred – Flat racing
- Website: Gulfstream Park

Race information
- Distance: 6 furlongs
- Surface: Dirt
- Track: Left-handed
- Qualification: Three-years-old and older
- Weight: Base weights with allowances: Older: 126 lbs 3YOs: 123 lbs
- Purse: US$100,000 (since 2022)

The Smile Sprint Stakes is a Listed American Thoroughbred horse race for horses aged three and older over a distance of six furlongs on the dirt run annually in early July at Gulfstream Park in Hallandale Beach, Florida.

== History ==
The race has its origins in what is considered the inaugural running on 8 September 1984 as the Miami Beach Handicap. However, an event with that name was held in 1973 and 1974 but was a two year old race over a distance of a 1 1/16 mile.

The following year the event was run over a slightly longer distance of 7 furlongs. In 1989 the event was run over 6 furlongs and in 1992 the event was run over a distance of a 6 1/2 furlongs.

In 1993 the event was renamed to the Miami Beach Sprint Handicap.

In 1999 the event was renamed to the Smile Sprint Handicap to honor Frances A. Genter Stable's Florida-bred colt, Smile. As a two-year-old in 1984, Smile became the first horse to win all three races in the Florida Stallion Stakes series at Calder Race Course. He went on to win the 1986 Breeders' Cup Sprint and was voted that year's American Champion Sprint Horse.

In 2003, the event was upgraded to Grade III status by the Thoroughbred Owners and Breeders Association and carried a $500,000 purse. Two years later the event was upgraded again to Grade II.

At times the event was part of the Breeders' Cup Challenge series, with the winner automatically qualifying for the Breeders' Cup Sprint.

In 2014 the event was not held and after negotiations between Calder Race Track and Gulfstream Park the event was moved to Gulfstream Park.

The event was modified to the Smile Sprint Stakes for the 2015 running when the conditions of the event were changed from handicap to stakes allowance.

In 2017 the event was downgraded back to Grade III.

Since 2021 the event has been an invitational event.

In 2024 the event was downgraded by the Thoroughbred Owners and Breeders Association to Listed status.

== Records ==
Speed record:

- 6 furlongs: – 1:08.82 Cool Arrow (2020)
- 7 furlongs: – 1:21.82 Constant Escort (1996)

Margins:

- 8 1/4 lengths – Shake You Down (2003)

Most wins:

- No horse has won this race more than once.

Most wins by a jockey:

- 3 – Emisael Jaramillo (2016, 2018, 2023)

Most wins by a trainer:

- 3 – David Fawkes (2000, 2010, 2013)

Most wins by an owner:

- No owner has won this race more than once.

== Winners ==
Year	Winner	Age	Jockey	Trainer	Owner	Distance	Time	Purse	Grade	Ref
At Gulfstream Park – Smile Sprint Stakes
2024	Comedy Town	4	Drayden Van Dyke	Saffie A. Joseph, Jr.	Ten Twenty Racing & Saffie A. Joseph, Jr.	6 furlongs	1:10.03	$110,000	Listed	
2023	Dean Delivers	4	Emisael Jaramillo	Michael Yates	Stonehedge	6 furlongs	1:09.28	$125,000	III	
2022	Willie Boi	4	Chantal Sutherland	Jorge Delgado	Lea Farms	6 furlongs	1:09.71	$150,000	III	
2021	Miles Ahead	4	Victor Espinoza	Edward Pleza Jr.	David Melin, Leon Ellman, Laurie Pleza	6 furlongs	1:09.61	$200,000	III	
2020	Cool Arrow	6	Leonel Reyes	Teresa M. Pompay	My Purple Haze Stables	6 furlongs	1:08.82	$100,000	III	
2019	Diamond Oops	4	Julien R. Leparoux	Patrick L. Biancone	Diamond 100 Racing Club, Amy Dunne & Patrick L. Biancone	6 furlongs	1:09.92	$250,000	III	
2018	X Y Jet	6	Emisael Jaramillo	Jorge Navarro	Rockingham Ranch & Gelfenstein Farm	6 furlongs	1:09.61	$272,500	III	
2017	Imperial Hint	4	Javier Castellano	Luis Carvajal Jr.	Raymond Mamone	6 furlongs	1:09.23	$250,000	III	
2016	Delta Bluesman	6	Emisael Jaramillo	Jorge Navarro	Monster Racing Stables	6 furlongs	1:08.94	$250,000	II	
2015	Favorite Tale	4	Edgard J. Zayas	Guadalupe Preciado	PJG Stable	6 furlongs	1:08.85	$250,000	II	
2014	Race not held									
At Calder Racetrack – Smile Sprint Handicap
2013	Bahamian Squall	4	Luis Saez	David Fawkes	Donald R. Dizney	6 furlongs	1:10.21	$350,000	II	
2012	Gantry	5	Richard E. Eramia	Ron Faucheux	Brittlyn Stable	6 furlongs	1:10.52	$400,000	II	
2011	Giant Ryan	5	Cornelio Velasquez	Bisnath Parboo	Shivananda Parbhoo	6 furlongs	1:11.34	$350,000	II	
2010	Big Drama	4	Eibar Coa	David Fawkes	Harold L. Queen	6 furlongs	1:10.93	$350,000	II	
2009	Eaton's Gift	4	Jose Lezcano	Dale L. Romans	Zayat Stables	6 furlongs	1:11.25	$350,000	II	
2008	Benny the Bull	5	Edgar S. Prado	Richard E. Dutrow Jr.	IEAH Stables, Greg James & Andrew I. Cohen	6 furlongs	1:11.41	$400,000	II	
2007	Mach Ride	4	Elvis Trujillo	Steven W. Standridge	Rustlewood Farm	6 furlongs	1:09.89	$500,000	II	
2006	Nightmare Affair	5	Jeffrey Sanchez	Manuel J. Azpurua	Timber Side Stable	6 furlongs	1:10.56	$500,000	II	
2005	Woke Up Dreamin	5	Mike E. Smith	Bob Baffert	Michael E. Pegram	6 furlongs	1:09.80	$500,000	II	
2004	Champali	4	Jerry D. Bailey	Gregory D. Foley	Lloyd Madison Farms, IV	6 furlongs	1:10.14	$500,000	III	
2003	Shake You Down	5	Michael J. Luzzi	Scott A. Lake	Robert L. Cole Jr.	6 furlongs	1:10.03	$500,000	III	
2002	Orientate	4	Mike E. Smith	D. Wayne Lukas	Bob & Beverly Lewis	6 furlongs	1:09.98	$400,000	Listed	
2001	Fappie's Notebook	4	Jorge F. Chavez	Emanuel Tortora	Irving & Marjorie Cowan	6 furlongs	1:09.89	$200,000	Listed	
2000	Forty One Carats	4	Javier Castellano	David Fawkes	New New New Stable & Buckingham Stables	6 furlongs	1:08.95	$300,000	Listed	
1999	Silver Season	3	Eibar Coa	Mohammed Moubarak	Buckram Oak Farm (Mahmoud Fustok)	6 furlongs	1:10.03	$300,000	Listed	
Miami Beach Sprint Handicap
1998	Heckofaralph	5	Wigberto S. Ramos	William J. Cesare	Elizabeth A. & Ralph C. Sessa	6 furlongs	1:11.48	$300,000	Listed	
1997	ƒ Vivace	4	Randy Romero	Cam Gambolati	Post Oak Farm	6 furlongs	1:10.65	$250,000	Listed	
1996	Constant Escort	4	Eduardo O. Nunez	Ralph Ziadie	Maxwell Breeders	7 furlongs	1:21.82	$100,000	Listed	
1995	Request a Star	4	Abdiel Toribio	William P. White	Paul O'Toole	7 furlongs	1:23.69	$100,000	Listed	
1994	Exclusive Praline	3	Wigberto S. Ramos	Steve Towne	Frank Calabrese	7 furlongs	1:22.29	$100,000	Listed	
Miami Beach Handicap
1993	Song of Ambition	4	Ricardo D. Lopez	Ernest Mello	Harold Queen	7 furlongs	1:22.52	$75,000	Listed	
1992	My Luck Runs North	3	Ricardo D. Lopez	Angel M. Medina	Melvin A. Benitez	6 1/2 furlongs	1:17.57	$75,000	Listed	
1991	Greg At Bat	6	Jacinto Vasquez	Ralph Ziadie	Adlam Racing Stable	7 furlongs	1:24.26	$75,000	Listed	
1990	Groomstick	4	Pedro A. Rodriguez	Luis Olivares	Cobbleview Stable	7 furlongs	1:24.20	$81,950		
1989	Glitterman	4	Walter Guerra	Gregory E. Sanders	O.H. Frisbia & Greg Sanders	6 furlongs	1:10.40	$54,950		
1988	Position Leader	3	Douglas Valiente	Jose A. Mendez	Sol Garazi & Michel Besso	7 furlongs	1:24.80	$82,725		
1987	Princely Lad	4	Benjamin Green	Leon W. Patman	Ace of Hearts Stable	7 furlongs	1:23.80	$54,300		
1986	Jeblar	4	Jose A. Velez Jr.	Frank Gomez	Michael H. Sherman	7 furlongs	1:24.80	$54,650		
1985	Opening Lead	5	Julio Molina Pezua	Manuel J. Azpurua	Brad D. Gay	7 furlongs	1:24.00	$54,500		
1984	I Really Will	4	Gene St. Leon	Frank Gomez	Frances A. Genter	6 furlongs	1:12.00	$56,400		

Notes:
ƒ Filly or Mare

== See also ==
- List of American and Canadian Graded races
