= Gardenia Stakes (Garden State Park) =

- Class: Discontinued stakes
- Location: Garden State Park Racetrack, Cherry Hill, New Jersey, United States
- Inaugurated: 1955
- Race type: Thoroughbred - Flat racing
- Website: www.pegasusworldcup.com

Race information
- Distance: 1 1/16 miles
- Surface: Dirt
- Track: left-handed
- Qualification: Two-year-old fillies

The Gardenia Stakes was an American Thoroughbred horse race run at Garden State Park Racetrack near Cherry Hill, New Jersey. Created in 1955, the event was the world's richest race for two-year-old fillies with a total purse of US$130,300 in its inaugural year. It was the counterpart to the Garden State Futurity for two-year-old male horses.

The Gardenia Stakes was placed on hiatus after the 1972 edition. It would be revived in 1980 at the Meadowlands Racetrack where it would be run thru to the final running in 1991. In 1990 only, the race was run on Turf.

== Historical notes ==
The inaugural running of the Gardenia Stakes took on a muddy track place on October 15, 1955 and was won by Nasrina who would be recognized as that year's American Co-Champion Two-Year-Old Filly. The substantial purse, as well as the Gardenia's place on the American racing calendar late in the year, would see the event won by fillies that would be voted National Champion honors for thirteen of its first eighteen runnings from 1955 thru 1972. Until 1970 there were three different racing organizations picking an annual National Champion and only two Gardenia winners prior to 1971, Castle Forbes in 1963 and Gallant Bloom in 1968, were not unanimous choices.

Gardenia winner Numbered Account, owned by Ogden Phipps and trained by Roger Laurin was the first Eclipse Award recipient in the two-year-old filly category. The following year, the future Hall of Fame inductee La Prevoyante won the Gardenia. Owned by Canadian J. Louis Lévesque and trained by Yonnie Starr, it was her final start of 1972 and marked her twelfth straight win without a loss. La Prevoyante would prove to be the last Gardenia winner to earn American Champion Two Year-Old Filly honors. In that year's voting for American Horse of the Year, La Prevoyante was second to Secretariat.

Flawlessly, a daughter of 1978 U.S. Triple Crown winner Affirmed, won the 1990 Gardenia and went on to a stellar career that saw her inducted into the U. S. Racing Hall of Fame in 2004.

| No. | Winner | Gardenia winner & 2yo U.S. Champion filly |
|---|---|---|
| 1 | 1955 | Nasrina |
| 2 | 1957 | Idun |
| 3 | 1958 | Quill |
| 4 | 1959 | My Dear Girl |
| 5 | 1960 | Bowl of Flowers |
| 6 | 1961 | Cicada |
| 7 | 1963 | Castle Forbes |
| 8 | 1964 | Queen Empress |
| 9 | 1965 | Moccasin |
| 10 | 1968 | Gallant Bloom |
| 11 | 1969 | Fast Attack |
| 12 | 1971 | Numbered Account |
| 13 | 1972 | La Prevoyante |

== Records ==
Speed record:

- 1:43.00 @ 1-1/16 miles: Princess Rooney (1982)

Most wins by a jockey:

- 3 - Bill Shoemaker (1960, 1961, 1964)

Most wins by a trainer:

- 3 - Casey Hayes (1961, 1966, 1967)
- 3 - Woody Stephens (1985, 1988, 1989)

Most wins by an owner:

- 3 - Meadow Stable (1961, 1966, 1967)

== Winners ==
| Year | Winner | Age | Jockey | Trainer | Owner | Dist. (Miles) | Time | Win$ | Gr. |
|---|---|---|---|---|---|---|---|---|---|
| 1991 | Miss Legality | 2 | Joe Bravo | Hubert "Sonny" Hine | Norton D. Waltuch | 1-1/16 m | 1:45.55 | $45,000 | G3 |
| 1990 | Flawlessly | 2 | Jerry D. Bailey | Richard E. Dutrow Sr. | Harbor View Farm | 1-1/16 m | 1:43.60 | $75,000 | G3 |
| 1989 | Danzig's Beauty | 2 | Eddie Maple | Woody Stephens | Russell L. Reineman | 1-1/16 m | 1:46.40 | $120,000 | G2 |
| 1988 | Gild | 2 | Julie Krone | Woody Stephens | Claiborne Farm | 1-1/16 m | 1:44.00 | $120,000 | G2 |
| 1987 | Thirty Eight Go Go | 2 | Kent Desormeaux | King T. Leatherbury | Janet Wayson | 1-1/16 m | 1:46.80 | $120,000 | G2 |
| 1986 | Collins | 2 | George Martens | Flint S. Schulhofer | Frances A. Genter | 1-1/16 m | 1:45.20 | $120,000 | G2 |
| 1985 | I'm Sweets | 2 | Eddie Maple | Woody Stephens | Brushwood Stable (Elizabeth Ranney Moran) | 1-1/16 m | 1:44.20 | $120,000 | G2 |
| 1984 | Bessarabian | 2 | Gary Stahlbaum | Michael J. Doyle | Eaton Hall Farm (Thor Eaton) | 1-1/16 m | 1:45.80 | $120,000 | G2 |
| 1983 | Lucky Lucky Lucky | 2 | Angel Cordero Jr. | D. Wayne Lukas | Leslie Combs II | 1-1/16 m | 1:45.20 | $120,000 | G2 |
| 1982 | Princess Rooney | 2 | Jacinto Vasquez | Frank Gomez | Paula J. Tucker | 1-1/16 m | 1:43.00 | $120,000 | G2 |
| 1981 | Vain Gold | 2 | Gregg McCarron | Sally A. Bailie | Aisco Stable | 1-1/16 m | 1:43.80 | $90,000 | G3 |
| 1980 | Carolina Command | 2 | Jimmy J. Miranda | James J. Pascuma Jr. | Marian S. Feldman | 1-1/16 m | 1:44.60 | $90,000 | |
| 1973 | 1979 | Race not held | | | | | | | |
| 1972 | La Prevoyante | 2 | John LeBlanc | Yonnie Starr | Jean-Louis Lévesque | 1-1/16 m | 1:47.40 | $114,552 | |
| 1971 | Numbered Account | 2 | Braulio Baeza | Roger Laurin | Ogden Phipps | 1-1/16 m | 1:45.80 | $110,625 | |
| 1970 | Eggy | 2 | Frank Lovato Sr. | Oscar White | Walter M. Jeffords Jr. | 1-1/16 m | 1:45.00 | $113,016 | |
| 1969 | Fast Attack | 2 | Buck Thornburg | Harry M. Wells | Hal-Bar Ranch (Mr. Hickey, Paul Robinson, William M. Ayers) | 1-1/16 m | 1:46.20 | $120,265 | |
| 1968 | Gallant Bloom | 2 | John L. Rotz | Max Hirsch | Robert J. Kleberg Jr. | 1-1/16 m | 1:45.80 | $110,142 | |
| 1967 | Gay Matelda | 2 | Robert Ussery | Casey Hayes | Meadow Stable | 1-1/16 m | 1:45.80 | $112,722 | |
| 1966 | Pepperwood | 2 | Robert Ussery | Casey Hayes | Meadow Stable | 1-1/16 m | 1:44.60 | $117,612 | |
| 1965 | Moccasin | 2 | Larry Adams | Harry Trotsek | Claiborne Farm | 1-1/16 m | 1:44.40 | $110,214 | |
| 1964 | Queen Empress | 2 | Bill Shoemaker | Bill Winfrey | Wheatley Stable | 1-1/16 m | 1:44.00 | $112,854 | |
| 1963 | Castle Forbes | 2 | Ismael Valenzuela | Bill Winfrey | Wheatley Stable | 1-1/16 m | 1:45.40 | $101.076 | |
| 1962 | Main Swap | 2 | Braulio Baeza | Charles R. Parke | Fred W. Hooper | 1-1/16 m | 1:46.40 | $95,977 | |
| 1961 | Cicada | 2 | Bill Shoemaker | Casey Hayes | Meadow Stable | 1-1/16 m | 1:44.80 | $91,131 | |
| 1960 | Bowl of Flowers | 2 | Bill Shoemaker | J. Elliott Burch | Brookmeade Stable | 1-1/16 m | 1:46.00 | $90,623 | |
| 1959 | My Dear Girl | 2 | Manuel N. Gonzales | Melvin Calvert | Frances A. Genter | 1-1/16 m | 1:46.60 | $79,304 | |
| 1958 | Quill | 2 | Paul J. Bailey | Lucien Laurin | Reginald N. Webster | 1-1/16 m | 1:45.20 | $81,576 | |
| 1957 | Idun | 2 | Bill Hartack | Sherrill W. Ward | Josephine Bay Paul | 1-1/16 m | 1:45.40 | $101,750 | |
| 1956 | Magic Forest † | 2 | Hedley Woodhouse | Sylvester Veitch | Cornelius Vanderbilt Whitney | 1-1/16 m | 1:45.20 | $93,550 | |
| 1955 | Nasrina | 2 | William Boland | Edward A. Christmas | Howell E. Jackson III | 1-1/16 m | 1:45.40 | $87,575 | |

* † Romanita finished first, but was disqualified and set back to third.
