= Affirmed Stakes =

Affirmed Stakes may refer to:

- Affirmed Stakes (LATC), a Los Angeles Turf Club Grade III horse race run at Santa Anita Park, Arcadia, California in July, that was formerly held at Hollywood Park Racetrack
- Affirmed Stakes (FS), a horse race in the Florida Stallion Stakes series formerly run at Calder Race Course, now part of the FTBOA Florida Sire stakes series at Gulfstream Park.
