= Desert Vixen Stakes =

Horse race in Florida, U.S.

(Florida Sires) Desert Vixen Stakes
- Class: Restricted Black Type
- Location: Gulfstream Park; Hallandale Beach, Florida
- Inaugurated: 1982
- Race type: Thoroughbred – Flat racing
- Website: www.gulfstreampark.com

Race information
- Distance: 6 furlongs
- Surface: Dirt
- Track: left-handed
- Qualification: Two-year-old fillies
- Weight: Assigned
- Purse: US$100,000

The Florida Sire Stakes Desert Vixen division is a thoroughbred horse race run annually at Gulfstream Park, in Hallandale Beach, Florida, for two-year-old fillies by FTBOA registered stallions at a distance of six furlongs on dirt. It is part of the eleven-race Florida Thoroughbred Breeders' & Owners' Association (FTBOA) Florida Sire series of which seven races are hosted by Gulfstream Park and four by Tampa Bay Downs.

== History ==
Inaugurated at Calder Race Course in 1982, the race was part of Calder's Florida Stallion Stakes series through 2013 after which Calder's racing operations were leased to the Stronach Group, operators of Gulfstream Park.

Named in honor of U.S. Racing Hall of Fame inductee Desert Vixen, it is the first and shortest of the three Gulfstream Park FBTOA races exclusively for this specific age and gender group of registered Florida-breds who are from a Florida Sire Stakes eligible stallion. Run between the beginning of August and the end of September, the Desert Vixen Stakes precedes the Susan's Girl Stakes at 7 furlongs and the My Dear Girl Stakes at 1 1/16 miles (8.5 furlongs).

== Records ==
Speed record at Gulfstream Park:

- At 6 furlongs : 1:11.08 by Go Astray in 2017

Speed record at Calder:

- At 6 furlongs : 1:11.26 by Valid Forbes in 2000

Most wins by a jockey:

- 4 – José A. Vélez Jr. (1983, 1984, 1988, 1990)

Most wins by a trainer:

- 3 – Emanuel Tortora (1989, 1996, 2009)
- 3 – Stanley I. Gold (2010, 2011, 2014)

Most wins by an owner:

- 3 – Jacks or Better Farm, Inc. (2010, 2011, 2014)

== Winners ==
Gulfstream Park 2017–2018 Media Guide and race history:

Year	Winner	Jockey	Trainer	Owner	Dist. (Miles)	Time	Win $
2019	Lenzi's Lucky Lady	Jairo Rendon	Kathleen O'Connell	Stonehedge LLC	6 F	1:13.55	$60,000
2018	Capture Your Dream	Tyler Gaffalione	Ángel M. Rodríguez	Kathy Machesky & John C. Oxley	6 F	1:11.31	$60,000
2017	Go Astray	Jose A. Batista	Ángel M. Rodriguez	Ramiro R. Medina	6 F	1:11.08	$60,000
2016	Cajun Delta Dawn	Juan Leyva	David J. Fawkes	Curtis Mikkelsen	6 F	1:11.94	$120,000
2015	It's High Time	Harry Hernandez	Jose M. Pinchin	Tracy Pinchin	6 F	1:12.59	$120,000
2014	Leap Year Luck	Jesus Rios	Stanley I. Gold	Jacks or Better Farm, Inc.	6 F	1:11.74	$60,000
2013	Scandalous Act	Eduardo O. Nunez	Kathleen O'Connell	Gilbert G. Campbell	6 F	1:11.87	$45,000
2012	Candy Coded Kisses	Cecilio Penalba	Easton DeSouza	Easton & Elsaida DeSouza	6 F	1:12.27	$45,000
2011	Redbud Road	Luis Saez	Stanley I. Gold	Jacks or Better Farm, Inc.	6 F	1:14.46	$45,000
2010	Awesome Feather	Jeffrey Sanchez	Stanley I. Gold	Jacks or Better Farm, Inc.	6 F	1:14.06	$45,000
2009	Sweetlalabye	Manoel Cruz	Emanuel Tortora	Jacqueline Tortora & Arcona	6 F	1:13.72	$60,000
2008	La Chica Sensual	Ray Fuentes	Pablo Andrade	Jennifer Harris & Brenda Tabraue	6 F	1:11.61	$60,000
2007	Silk Ridge	Manuel Aguilar	Gordon R. Potter	Karen Keen	6 F	1:13.64	$60,000
2006	Snow Lady	Abel Castellano Jr.	Edward Plesa Jr.	Padua Stable	6 F	1:13.94	$60,000
2005	Running Lass	Manoel Cruz	Angel C. Salinas	Michael Sherman & William Condren	6 F	1:12.45	$45,000
2004	Aclassysassylassy	Manuel Aguilar	David A. Vivian	Barbara Vivian & Dominic Vitesse	6 F	1:12.37	$45,000
2003	French Village	Cecilio Penalba	William P. White	Eugene & Laura Melnyk	6 F	1:12.46	$45,000
2002	Fortunate Card	Sebastian Madrid	N. Henry Collazo	Richlyn Farms	6 F	1:11.72	$45,000
2001	Pharmstar	Cornelio Velásquez	Ralph Ziadie	Centaur Farms	6 F	1:12.79	$45,000
2000	Valid Forbes	Julio Garcia	Ralph Ziadie	Centaur Farms	6 F	1:11.26	$45,000
1999	Sweeping	Jhonny Rojas	Julian O. Canet	G&P Enterprises	6 F	1:12.13	$45,000
1998	A Penny Saved	Rosemary Homeister Jr.	Joe Waunsch	Jaime Carion	6 F	1:12.00	$45,000
1997	Nancy's Glitter	Pedro Rodriguez	Frederick O. Knibbs	Cecilia & Elbert Dixon	6 F	1:12.80	$45,000
1996	Devilish Brunette	Dale Beckner	Emanuel Tortora	James Lewis Jr.	6 F	1:12.40	$45,000
1995	U Can Do It	Eibar Coa	Duke Davis	Carina & Frank Marano	6 F	1:11.80	$45,000
1994	Cottage Flower	Gary Boulanger	James E. Bracken	Kathy Jo Stable	6 F	1:13.42	$45,000
1993	Miss Gibson County	Abdiel Toribio	Martin D. Wolfson	Michael E. Pegram	6 F	1:12.20	$45,000
1992	Sigrun	René Douglas	Jacqueline Brittain	Elaine Wold	6 F	1:12.40	$45,000
1991	Mystic Obsession	Eric Valles	J. David Braddy	Anita Hicken	6 F	1:12.80	$60,000
1990	Nany's Appeal	José A. Vélez Jr.	Richard R. Root	Harry T. Mangurian Jr.	6 F	1:12.40	$30,000
1989-1	Stacie's Toy	Jorge F. Chavez	J. David Braddy	Joel W. Sanier	6 F	1:13.00	$30,000
1989-2	Oh My Jessica Pie	Mike Gonzalez	Emanuel Tortora	Bee Bee Stables	6 F	1:11.80	$30,000
1988-1	Born Famous	José A. Vélez Jr.	Reed M. Combest	Ann & Clint Lagrosa	6 F	1:11.80	$30,000
1988-2	Seaquay	Robyn Ehrlinspeil	James R. Garrard	Barbara Handy & Gerry Swanson	6 F	1:11.80	$30,000
1987-1	Go Gaiter	Heberto Castillo Jr.	J. Carroll Barnhill	Julianne Barnhill	6 F	1:14.00	$30,000
1987-2	Crafty Wife	Constantino Hernandez	Philip A. Gleaves	Due Process Stable	6 F	1:13.40	$30,000
1986-1	My Nichole	Robyn Ehrlinspeil	Edward Plesa Jr.	Loretta Kessler & Dan Ebert	6 F	1:13.20	$30,000
1986-2	Blues Court	Robert Lester	David A. Vivian	M. Roy Cohen	6 F	1:11.80	$30,000
1985-1	Summer Flight	Odin J. Londono	Newcomb Green	Aronoe Stable	6 F	1:13.20	$30,000
1985-2	Regal Princess	Odin J. Londono	Jose A. Mendez	Fred Berens & Sol Garazi	6 F	1:12.60	$30,000
1984	French Gold	José A. Vélez Jr.	Carl J. Domino	P. Lyon & P. Haley	6 F	1:15.20	$51,000
1983-1	Early Lunch	José A. Vélez Jr.	James E. Bracken	Roy Bowen	6 F	1:12.60	$27,000
1983-2	Majestic Flag	Gene St. Leon	Curtis Spencer	Oak Manor Farm	6 F	1:13.20	$27,300
1982	Crystal Rail	Chuck Baltazar	Marvin Moncrief	Dan R. Lasater	6 F	1:12.80	$36,900
