= Walter Guerra =

American jockey

Personal information
- Born: June 7, 1962 (age 64) Panama City, Panama
- Occupation: Jockey

Horse racing career
- Sport: Horse racing
- Career wins: 1,691

Major racing wins
- Steeplechase wins: New York Turf Writers Cup (1985) Flat racing wins: A Gleam Handicap (1982); Goodwood Stakes (1982); New Orleans Handicap (1982); San Fernando Stakes (1982); San Juan Capistrano Handicap (1982); Strub Stakes (1982); Cliff Hanger Handicap (1984); Diana Stakes (1984); Jersey Derby (1984); Kelso Stakes (1984); Santa Monica Stakes (1984); San Bernardino Handicap (1984); Belmont Futurity Stakes (1985); Shirley Jones Handicap (1985); Tropical Park Handicap (1985, 1988); Suwannee River Stakes (1985); Distaff Handicap (1986); Dixie Stakes (1986); Dwyer Stakes (1986); Jerome Stakes (1986); Queen Elizabeth II Challenge Cup Stakes (1986); Red Smith Handicap (1986); Top Flight Handicap (1986); Riva Ridge Stakes (1986); Boiling Springs Stakes (1987); Bonnie Miss Stakes (1987); Affirmed Stakes (1989); In Reality Stakes (1989,1990); Miami Beach Handicap (1989) Breeders' Cup wins: Breeders' Cup Juvenile Fillies (1984); Breeders' Cup Mile (1985)

Significant horses
- Cozzene, Ogygian, It's the One, Creme Fraiche, Lemhi Gold, Outstandingly

Walter A. Guerra (born June 7, 1962, in Panama City, Panama) is a retired American Thoroughbred horse racing jockey who rode successfully in both Steeplechase and flat racing, in the latter winning two Breeders' Cup World Championship races.

Guerra began riding in the United States in 1979 at Calder Race Course where his success over the years would result in his 1998 induction into the Calder Race Course Hall of Fame. He was 22 years old when he won the 1984 Breeders' Cup Juvenile Fillies with Outstandingly. The following year he rode Cozzene to a win in the Breeders' Cup Mile.

In 1996, Walter Guerra retired from riding but made a brief comeback in 1999 before retiring permanently.
