= Awesome Feather =

American-bred Thoroughbred racehorse

- Sire: Awesome Of Course
- Grandsire: Awesome Again
- Dam: Precious Feather
- Damsire: Gone West
- Sex: Mare
- Foaled: March 15, 2008
- Died: March 2, 2023 (aged 14)
- Country: United States
- Colour: Bay
- Breeder: Jacks Or Better Farm Inc.
- Owner: Frank Stronach
- Trainer: Stanley I. Gold; Chad C. Brown (2011)
- Record: 11: 10-0-0
- Earnings: US$1,912,746

Major wins
- J J's Dream Stakes (2010); Desert Vixen Stakes (2010); Susan's Girl Stakes (2010); My Dear Girl Stakes (2010); Gazelle Handicap (2011); Sunshine Millions Distaff (2012); Nasty Storm Stakes (2012) Breeders' Cup wins: Breeders' Cup Juvenile Fillies (2010)

Awards
- American Champion 2-year-old filly (2010)
- Last updated on December 29, 2019

Awesome Feather (March 15, 2008 – 2 March 2023) was an American Champion Thoroughbred racehorse who won the Breeders' Cup Juvenile Fillies.

She was bred and raced by Fred and Jane Brei's Jacks Or Better Farm Inc. and trained by Stanley Gold. Her jockey was Jeffrey Sanchez for all her races. She was sold for $2.3 million to Frank Stronach at the November 7, 2010 Fasig-Tipton sale after which her training was taken over by Chad Brown. Awesome Feather was sired by Awesome Of Course, and her dam was Precious Feather.

== 2010 season ==
On May 1, 2010, Awesome Feather won a 4 1/2 furlong Maiden race.

On July 10, 2010, Awesome Feather got her first stakes race win in the J J's Dream Stakes at Calder Race Course.

Awesome Feather went on to win the Desert Vixen Stakes.

On August 28, 2010, Awesome Feather was undefeated when she won the Susan's Girl Stakes going 6 furlongs at Calder Race Course.

On October 16, 2010, Awesome Feather won the My Dear Girl Stakes at Calder Race Course as a favourite.

On November 5, 2010, Awesome Feather won the Breeders' Cup Juvenile Fillies. She was now undefeated in 6 starts.

== 2011/12 season ==
Awesome Feather won the 2011 Gazelle Handicap and on January 29, 2012, she ran away from the field in the Sunshine Millions Distaff and won by 5 3/4 lengths. Following an eight-month layoff due to tendon problems, Awesome Feather returned to racing on September 20, 2012, in the Nasty Storm Stakes at New York's Belmont Park. In a dominating performance, she won by 11¼ lengths in the very fast time of 1:33.47 for the mile.

== Career statistics ==
Finish	Jockey	Race	1st	2nd	3rd	Time
1st	Jeffrey Sanchez	Nasty Storm Stakes	Awesome Feather	All Due Respect	Daddy's Honor	1:33.47
1st	J. Sanchez	Sunshine Millions Distaff	Awesome Feather	Delightful Mary	Sweet Repent	1:49.17
1st	J. Sanchez	Gazelle Handicap	Awesome Feather	Draw It	Love and Pride	1:50.20
1st	J. Sanchez	Le Slew Stakes	Awesome Feather	Sentimental Lass	Flying Train	1:22.76
1st	J. Sanchez	Breeders' Cup Juvenile Fillies	Awesome Feather	R Heat Lightning	Delightful Mary	1:45.13
1st	J. Sanchez	FS My Dear Girl	Awesome Feather	Lilly's Hope	Beso Grande	1:48.05
1st	J. Sanchez	FS Susan's Girl	Awesome Feather	Cristal Jak	Silverest	1:24.57
1st	J. Sanchez	FS Desert Vixen	Awesome Feather	Blue Eyed Sweetie	My Sunshine Gal	1:14.06
1st	J. Sanchez	JJ's Dream	Awesome Feather	Because I Like It	Blue Eyed Sweetie	1:06.50
1st	J. Sanchez	MSW	Awesome Feather	Nicey Nice	Sansannah	0:53.53

Awesome Feather died on March 2, 2023, less than two weeks from her 15th birthday.

== Pedigree ==
Pedigree of Awesome Feather (USA), bay filly, 2008
Sire Awesome Of Course 2000	Awesome Again; 1994	Deputy Minister	Vice Regent
Sire Awesome Of Course 2000	Awesome Again; 1994	Deputy Minister	Mint Copy
Sire Awesome Of Course 2000	Awesome Again; 1994	Primale Force	Blushing Groom
Sire Awesome Of Course 2000	Awesome Again; 1994	Primale Force	Prime Prospect
Sire Awesome Of Course 2000	Mais Oui; 1987	Lyphard	Northern Dancer
Sire Awesome Of Course 2000	Mais Oui; 1987	Lyphard	Goofed
Sire Awesome Of Course 2000	Mais Oui; 1987	Affirmatively	Affirmed
Sire Awesome Of Course 2000	Mais Oui; 1987	Affirmatively	Straight Deal
Dam Precious Feather 1997	Gone West; 1984	Mr. Prospector	Raise a Native
Dam Precious Feather 1997	Gone West; 1984	Mr. Prospector	Gold Digger
Dam Precious Feather 1997	Gone West; 1984	Secrettame	Secretariat
Dam Precious Feather 1997	Gone West; 1984	Secrettame	Tamerett
Dam Precious Feather 1997	Last Feather; 1979	Vaguely Noble	Vienna
Dam Precious Feather 1997	Last Feather; 1979	Vaguely Noble	Noble Lassie
Dam Precious Feather 1997	Last Feather; 1979	Quill	Princequillo
Dam Precious Feather 1997	Last Feather; 1979	Quill	Quick Touch
