= Chuck Baltazar =

American horse jockey

Personal information
- Born: May 22, 1947 (age 79) Fort Morgan, Colorado, United States
- Occupation: Jockey

Horse racing career
- Sport: Horse racing
- Career wins: 2,912

Major racing wins
- Jennings Handicap (1965, 1966, 1968, 1975); Adirondack Stakes (1968); Arlington-Washington Lassie Stakes (1968); John B. Campbell Handicap (1968, 1970); Stuyvesant Handicap (1968); Gallorette Handicap (1969); Bay Shore Stakes (1970); Canadian International Stakes (1970); Distaff Handicap (1970, 1972); Excelsior Handicap (1970); Juvenile Stakes (1970, 1973); Long Island Handicap (1970); Paumonok Handicap (1970); Prioress Stakes (1970); Roamer Handicap (1970); Vagrancy Handicap (1970); Arlington Classic (1971); Bed O' Roses Handicap (1971); Bowling Green Handicap (1971); Edgemere Handicap (1971); Hialeah Turf Cup Handicap (1971); National Stallion Stakes (filly division) (1971); Palm Beach Handicap (1971); Spinaway Stakes (1971); Test Stakes (1971); Wood Memorial Stakes (1971); Youthful Stakes (1971, 1973); Gotham Stakes (1972); Knickerbocker Handicap (1973); Remsen Stakes (1973); Tremont Stakes (1973, 1974); Sanford Stakes (1974); James W. Murphy Stakes (1975); Shirley Jones Handicap (1976); Clement L. Hirsch Handicap (1977); Baldwin Stakes (1979); Desert Vixen Stakes (1982); Dr. Fager Stakes (1982, 1987); Criterium Stakes (1982); My Dear Girl Stakes (1982); Susan's Girl Stakes (1982); Affirmed Stakes (1983); Skip Away Handicap (1987)

Significant horses
- Drumtop, In Reality, Office Queen, Numbered Account, Process Shot, Riva Ridge, Foolish Pleasure

Charles S. Baltazar (born May 22, 1947, in Fort Morgan, Colorado) is a retired American Thoroughbred horse racing jockey who rode regularly from 1964 to 1990. After retiring he became a participant in Western disciplines as a non-professional in National Reined Cow Horse Association events.

== Riding career ==
Chuck Baltazar began riding in 1964 in Nebraska then in 1965 went east to Detroit and soon to tracks on the East Coast. In 1971, he rode the two-year-old Riva Ridge in his first four races before Ron Turcotte took over. On December 15, 1969, Chuck Baltazar broke all Maryland riding records when he rode home seven consecutive winners at Laurel Park racetrack. Baltazar had two starts in each of the U.S. Triple Crown series. His best result in the Kentucky Derby came in the 1972 running when he rode Freetex to a sixth-place finish. In the Preakness Stakes his best result a fourth aboard Sound Off in the 1971 edition. His seventh place in the 1972 Belmont Stakes, again aboard Freetex, was his best.
