= Jeffrey Sanchez (jockey) =

Personal information
- Born: October 18, 1985 (age 40) San Juan, Puerto Rico
- Occupation: Jockey

Horse racing career
- Sport: Horse racing

Major racing wins
- Smile Sprint Handicap (2006); Spend A Buck Handicap (2006); Iowa Derby (2007); Ohio Derby (2007); Criterium Stakes (2009); Affirmed Stakes (2009); Desert Vixen Stakes (2010); Susan's Girl Stakes (2010); My Dear Girl Stakes (2010); J J's Dream Stakes (2010); Kennedy Road Stakes (2010); Sapling Stakes (2010); Sunshine Millions Filly & Mare Sprint (2011); Gazelle Handicap (2011); Sunshine Millions Distaff (2012); Beaumont Stakes (2012); Stars and Stripes Stakes (2012) Breeders' Cup wins: Breeders' Cup Juvenile Fillies (2010)

Significant horses
- Awesome Feather, Judy the Beauty

Jeffrey Sanchez (born October 18, 1985, in San Juan, Puerto Rico) is a jockey in American Thoroughbred horse racing best known for winning the 2010 Breeders' Cup Juvenile Fillies aboard Awesome Feather with whom he also swept the Florida Stallion Stakes at Calder Race Course.

Sanchez raced in his native Puerto Rico before coming to the United States in 2005.

== Year-end charts ==
Chart (2009–present)	Peak position
National Earnings List for Jockeys 2009	87
National Earnings List for Jockeys 2010	74
