= Princess Rooney =

American-bred Thoroughbred racehorse

- Sire: Verbatim
- Grandsire: Speak John
- Dam: Parrish Princess
- Damsire: Drone
- Sex: Filly
- Foaled: 1980
- Country: United States
- Colour: Gray
- Breeder: Parrish Hill Farm
- Owner: Paula J. Tucker
- Trainer: Neil D. Drysdale
- Record: 21: 17-2-1
- Earnings: $1,343,339

Major wins
- Gardenia Stakes (1982); Frizette Stakes (1982); Melaleuca Stakes (1982); Kentucky Oaks (1983); Ashland Stakes (1983); Vanity Invitational Handicap (1984); Spinster Stakes(1984); Clement L. Hirsch Handicap (1984); Breeders' Cup Distaff (1984)

Awards
- U.S. Champion Older Mare (1984)

Honours
- United States Racing Hall of Fame (1991); Calder Race Course Hall of Fame (1995); Princess Rooney Stakes at Gulfstream Park
- Last updated on 30 June 2021

Princess Rooney (March 22, 1980 – October 7, 2008) was an American Champion Thoroughbred racehorse who was the first winner of a Breeders' Cup race to be inducted into the U.S. Racing Hall of Fame.

== Racing career ==
Racing at age two, Princess Rooney won all six of her starts that marked the beginnings of a three-year racing career in which she would finish out of the money only once. In 1983, at age three, she won five of her six races, including the Kentucky Oaks and finished second one time. At age four, Princess Rooney won five races then secured her first Eclipse Award as the United States' Champion Older Mare with a victory in the 1984 Breeders' Cup Distaff. Princess Rooney was owned throughout her racing career by Paula Tucker.

== Stud record ==
Retired after her Breeder's Cup win, in 1985 Princess Rooney was in foal to leading sire Danzig when Texan George Aubin purchased her at the Keeneland Sales November auction for $5.5 million, at the time the third-highest amount ever paid for a broodmare. Princess Rooney turned out to be less than a success in breeding and ten years later was sold for $130,000 to the Gentry Brothers Farm near Lexington, Kentucky, in 1995. In 2004 she produced her last foal, House of Words. House of Words is a 2008 winner.

Princess Rooney was euthanized at Gentry Brothers Farm near Lexington October 7, 2008, due to complications of equine protozoal myeloencephalitis (EPM). She had been diagnosed with EPM at Rood & Riddle Equine Hospital August 1, 2008.

Two of Princess Rooney's daughters, Rooneys Princess and Rose Tiara, are broodmares at Gentry Brothers. Rooneys Princess' yearling is a Tale of the Cat colt, Rosa Tiara's yearling is a Lion Heart filly.

== Honors ==
In 1991, Princess Rooney was inducted into the United States' National Museum of Racing and Hall of Fame.
