= Birmingham Race Course =

- Location: 1000 John Rogers Dr. Birmingham, AL 35235
- Owned by: PCI Gaming (since Apr. 2025)
- Date opened: March 3, 1987
- Date closed: July 1, 1995 (Thoroughbred); April 2020 (Greyhound)
- Notable races: Alabama Derby

The Birmingham Race Course Casino is a casino and defunct Thoroughbred/Greyhound racetrack located in Birmingham, Alabama. Opening as the Birmingham Turf Club in 1987, it was the most recent Thoroughbred race track that opened in the state of Alabama. Thoroughbred racing at the track ceased in 1995. In 1992, Greyhound racing was introduced and operated until 2020.

While the casino remains open, there have been multiple proposals to bring Thoroughbred racing back to the track. As of 2026, however, no plans have come to fruition.

== History ==
The track opened to the public with the Birmingham Inaugural Stakes on March 3, 1987. A month later, a record crowd of 17,562 for the inaugural Alabama Derby on April 11, which was won by Lost Code. The race was broadcast on ESPN, and was announced by Larry Collmus.

By the end of its inaugural 175-day season the track had lost $50,000,000 and the operators filed for bankruptcy reorganization in November 1988. Owners suggested adding dog-racing to the track, but a referendum to legalize it was defeated. The facility was sold out of bankruptcy to Delaware North, which re-instituted thoroughbred racing a year later.

The track re-opened on May 26, 1989, as the Birmingham Race Course and hosted a record crowd of over 15,000 on that Friday night. Crowds and wagers again dwindled, and the track would struggle financially.

On June 30, 1991, Guns N' Roses played a concert at the venue.

In 1992, the track was purchased by Milton McGregor of AmSouth Bank, and Thoroughbred racing returned after a 2-year hiatus. On October 28, the track would introduce Greyhound racing.

On July 1, 1995, Thoroughbred racing officially ceased at the racetrack, with the last race being won by Overtime Hank.

On March 18, 2020, Greyhound racing ceased at the track. While not banned statewide, it was the final Greyhound track to close in the state of Alabama.

On November 18, 2024, the casino was sold to PCI Gaming, a subsidiary of the Poarch Band of Creek Indians.
