= My Dear Girl =

American-bred Thoroughbred racehorse

- Sire: Rough'n Tumble
- Grandsire: Free For All
- Dam: Iltis
- Damsire: War Relic
- Sex: Filly
- Foaled: 1957
- Country: United States
- Colour: Bay
- Breeder: Ocala Stud
- Owner: Frances A. Genter
- Trainer: Melvin Calvert
- Record: 20: 8-4-1
- Earnings: US$209,739

Major wins
- Frizette Stakes (1959); Florida Breeders' Stakes (1959); Gardenia Stakes (1959); Miss Chicago Purse (1959)

Awards
- American Champion Two-Year-Old Filly (1959)

Honours
- My Dear Girl Stakes at Gulfstream Park

My Dear Girl (foaled February 17, 1957 in Florida) was an American Champion Thoroughbred racehorse.

== Background ==
My Dear Girl was bred by Ocala Stud Farm, owned by a nine-person syndicate headed by Bruce Campbell that was in just its second year of operation. She was purchased by Floridian Frances A. Genter, who would own and race a number of top horses including Unbridled, who won the 1990 Kentucky Derby.

== Racing career ==
My Dear Girl made her racing debut on February 19, 1959, at Florida's Hialeah Park Race Track. She was initially trained by Melvin "Sunshine" Calvert's assistant George Seabo but after the filly won the 1959 Florida Breeders' Stakes at Hialeah, Calvert decided to take charge. She went on to win the important Frizette Stakes at Belmont Park and at Garden State Park the Gardenia Stakes which she won by five lengths on a muddy track that would prove to be the clincher for national honors. After finishing 1959 with five wins from seven starts, all under jockey Manuel Gonzales, My Dear Girl was voted American Champion Two-Year-Old Filly.

== Breeding record ==
My Dear Girl was a successful broodmare for her owner Frances Genter, and her most notable offspring to race was In Reality.

== Honors ==
Inaugurated at Calder Race Course in 1982, the My Dear Girl Stakes was part of Calder's Florida Stallion Stakes series through 2013. After Calder's racing operations were leased to the Stronach Group it was moved to their Gulfstream Park operation when it became part of the Florida Thoroughbred Breeders' & Owners' Association (FTBOA) Florida Sire series .
