= Flint S. Schulhofer =

American racehorse trainer

Scotty Schulhofer
Personal information
- Born: May 30, 1926 Aiken, South Carolina, United States
- Died: December 14, 2006 (aged 80)
- Occupation: Trainer

Horse racing career
- Sport: Horse racing
- Career wins: 1,119

Major racing wins
- Fall Highweight Handicap (1969, 1970, 1989, 1993); Vosburgh Stakes (1969, 1989, 1990, 1992); Manhattan Handicap (1970); Hempstead Handicap (1970); Correction Handicap (1970, 1971); Sport Page Handicap (1971, 1974); Bougainvillea Handicap (1971,1996); Canadian International Stakes (1978); Lexington Handicap (1978); Secretariat Stakes (1978); Washington, D.C. International Stakes (1978); Black Helen Handicap (1982, 1994); Ramona Handicap (1982); Nassau Stakes (1982); Jersey Derby (1983); Affirmed Stakes (1984); Delaware Handicap (1985); Gulfstream Park Handicap (1985); Dahlia Stakes (USA) 1986); Demoiselle Stakes (1986, 1993); Gardenia Stakes (1986); Matron Stakes (1986, 1993, 1994); Spinaway Stakes (1986, 1993); Florida Derby (1987, 1991); Hawthorne Gold Cup (1988, 1989); Belmont Futurity Stakes (1989, 1994, 1998); Donn Handicap (1989); Tom Fool Handicap (1989, 1992); Champagne Stakes (1990); Damon Runyon Stakes (1991); NYRA Mile (1991); Wood Memorial Stakes (1991); Carter Handicap (1992); Saratoga Special Stakes (1992, 1994); Peter Pan Stakes (1994, 2000); Jockey Club Gold Cup (1994); Whitney Handicap (1994, 1995, 2000); Royal Palm Handicap (1995); Turf Classic (1995); Travers Stakes (1999); Brooklyn Handicap (2000); Suburban Handicap (2000); Woodward Stakes (2000); Beldame Stakes (2001) American Classics / Breeders' Cup wins: Breeders' Cup Sprint (1986); Breeders' Cup Juvenile (1990); Belmont Stakes (1993, 1999)

Honors
- United States' Racing Hall of Fame (1992)

Significant horses
- Ta Wee, Mac Diarmida, Montreal Marty, Smile, Cryptoclearance, Dr. Carter, Fly So Free, Rubiano, Colonial Affair, Lemon Drop Kid, Stormy Blues, Sewickley, Tappiano, Cahill Road

Flint S. "Scotty" Schulhofer (May 30, 1926 – December 14, 2006) was an American Hall of Fame Thoroughbred racehorse trainer.

== Early life ==
Schulhofer was born into a racing family in Aiken, South Carolina, where his father owned a racing stable as well as a riding academy. While in his teens, he worked for trainer Oleg Dubassoff before serving overseas with the United States Army infantry during World War II. At war's end, he studied for two years at The Citadel in Charleston, South Carolina. Enrolled in a premed program, he did not pursue his education further, preferring to return to the horse racing industry.

== Training career ==
In 1962, Schulhofer saddled his first winner at Aqueduct Racetrack. He went on to win 1,328 races, including two Breeders' Cup races, and the Belmont Stakes Classic, twice.

== Retirement ==
Schulhofer retired from training in 2002 but remained active within the industry as a breeder. He was living in Hollywood, Florida at the time of his death on December 14, 2006. He is buried in Aiken, South Carolina.

His son, Randy Schulhofer, is also a Thoroughbred trainer.

== Honors ==
Schulhofer was inducted into the National Museum of Racing and Hall of Fame in 1992.
