= Alabama Derby =

- Class: Grade III (1996–1997)
- Location: Birmingham Turf Club; Birmingham, AL (1987–1995); Louisiana Downs; Bossier City, LA (1996–1997)
- Inaugurated: 1987
- Final run: 1997
- Race type: Thoroughbred

Race information
- Distance: 1 1/8 Mile
- Surface: Dirt
- Track: Left-handed
- Qualification: Three-year-olds

The Alabama Derby was an American Thoroughbred horse race that was run from 1987 to 1997. The race was run at 1 1/8 mile for three-year-old thoroughbreds in early April.

== History ==
Inaugurated at the then newly opened (now defunct) Birmingham Turf Club, in Birmingham, Alabama, the race was won by Lost Code.

The race was not run in 1988.

In 1989, the race returned, but would not be run for the next two years.

In 1992, the race returned again with Always Silver setting the race record at 1:49.43.

In 1995, Thoroughbred racing at the Birmingham Turf Club ceased. The 1996–1997 races were held at Louisiana Downs in Bossier City, Louisiana, before the race was officially discontinued.

== Winners ==
Year	Winner	Jockey	Trainer	Owner	Purse	Track	Time	Grade
1997	Mr. Groush	Shane J. Sellers	H. James Bond	Rudlein Stable	$200,000	Louisiana Downs	1:49.20	III
1996	Vivace	Carlos Gonzalez	M. Brent Davidson	Post Oak Farm	$250,000	Louisiana Downs	1:50.88	III
1995	Dazzling Falls	Garrett K. Gomez	Chuck Turco	Chateau Ridge Farm, Inc.	$200,000	Birmingham Turf Club	1:50.80	
1994	Danville	Larry Melancon	William G. Huffman	Top of the Key Stable	$200,000	Birmingham Turf Club	1:49.66	
1993	Foxtrail	Bobby J. Walker Jr.	Larry Robideaux Jr.	Linda Bennett	$100,000	Birmingham Turf Club	1:52.51	
1992	Always Silver	Willie Martinez	Emanuel Tortora	James R. Lewis Jr.	$100,000	Birmingham Turf Club	1:49.43	Listed
1989	Dispersal	Jorge Velasquez	Grover G. Delp	Tom O. Meyerhoff	$150,000	Birmingham Turf Club	1:49.80	
1987	Lost Code	Gene St. Leon	William L. Donovan	Wendover Stable	$350,000	Birmingham Turf Club	1:51.60	

== Notes ==
- A similarly named quarter horse race named the Alabama Bred Futurity Stakes was run at Delta Downs from 2001 to 2008, although it had no relation to the Alabama Derby.
