= Smile (horse) =

American-bred Thoroughbred racehorse

- Sire: In Reality
- Grandsire: Intentionally
- Dam: Sunny Smile
- Damsire: Boldnesian
- Sex: Stallion
- Foaled: 1982
- Country: United States
- Colour: Bay
- Breeder: Frances A. Genter
- Owner: Frances A. Genter
- Trainer: Flint S. Schulhofer
- Record: 27: 14-4-3
- Earnings: $1,664,027

Major wins
- Criterium Stakes (1984); Dr. Fager Stakes (1984); Affirmed Stakes (1984); In Reality Stakes (1984); Carry Back Stakes (1985); Arlington Classic Stakes (1985); Fairmount Park Derby (1985); Canterbury Cup Handicap (1986); Equipoise Mile Handicap (1986); Breeders' Cup Sprint (1986)

Awards
- Eclipse Champion Sprinter (1986)

Honours
- Smile Sprint Stakes
- Last updated on 4/19/2018

Smile (March 26, 1982 – June 1997) was a Florida-bred racehorse born in 1982. He was sired by the stallion In Reality and was out of the Boldnesian mare Sunny Smile, who also produced the Gr. 2 winner Sunshine Today and the multiple stakes winner Charging Through.

== Race career ==
Smile started his race career at Calder Race Track in Florida, where he was bred. He was undefeated throughout his two-year-old campaign with wins in the Criterium, Dr. Fager, Affirmed and In Reality Stakes. In his three-year-old season, Smile won in the Carry Back Stakes before moving on to Arlington Park. He placed in the Gr. 2 Sheridan Stakes and came in second to Banner Bob, then won the then-Gr. 1 Arlington Classic. In the Gr. 1 American Derby, Smile came in third behind that year’s Belmont Stakes winner, Creme Fraiche. Smile then won the Grade III Fairmount Park Derby, setting a new track record for 9 furlongs with a time of 1:49.0. After two more races, he went to Aqueduct to take part in that year’s Breeders' Cup Sprint. Smile came in second to champion Precisionist. In his last start at age 3, he competed in the Gr. 1 Vosburgh Stakes and came in fourth behind Another Reef and Pancho Villa.

Smile’s four-year-old season got off to a rocky start with a seventh-place finish in the Metropolitan Handicap and a fourth in the True North Handicap. His season then improved with a win in the Canterbury Cup and a showing in the Gr. 3 Cornhusker Handicap. Smile got one more win in the Gr. 3 Equipoise Mile and a sixth place in the Philadelphia Park Breeders’ Cup before he took another try at the Breeders' Cup Sprint. Smile won the race, equaling the stakes record set the previous year by Precisionist. Smile was named that year’s Eclipse Champion Sprinter. In 1987, he started his five-year-old season with a second in the Tropical Park Breeders’ Cup. He finished in the money in one of his next two starts. Smile’s trainer decided "...his last few races were not up to his standard and he has earned his retirement." A week after his fourth-place finish in the Gulfstream Park Breeders’ Cup, he was shipped back to his place of birth, Tartan Farms, to take over at stud for his sire, In Reality, who was getting on in years.

== Breeding career ==
In Reality was known for being a sire of sires, so expectations were high for Smile. He first stood stud at Tartan Farms for a fee of US$15,000. While he produced stakes winners in the colt Smiling Time and the filly Lavender, he was not a major success and was eventually relocated to a more modest farm in Texas. In 2004, Smarty Jones (son of Smile's daughter I'll Get Along) won the Kentucky Derby and Preakness Stakes. Smile died in Texas at the age of 15 from complications of the neurological disease EPM.
