= Gary Boulanger =

Canadian jockey

Personal information
- Born: November 19, 1967 (age 58) Drayton Valley, Alberta, Canada
- Occupation: Jockey

Horse racing career
- Sport: Horse racing
- Career winnings: US$83,543,795
- Career wins: 3,698

Major racing wins
- Gottstein Futurity (1990, 1991); All-American Handicap (1992); California Derby (1992); Affirmed Stakes (1994, 1997); Calder Derby (1994, 1997); Desert Vixen Stakes (1994); Foolish Pleasure Stakes (1994, 2003); Fred W. Hooper Handicap (1994); Susan's Girl Stakes (1994, 2003); My Dear Girl Stakes (1995); Princess Rooney Handicap (1995); Tampa Bay Derby (1995); Black Helen Handicap (1996); Cicada Stakes (1996); Columbiana Handicap (1996, 1997); Fountain of Youth Stakes (1996); Eatontown Handicap (1996); What A Pleasure Stakes (1996); Bahamas Stakes (1997); Chaposa Springs Handicap (1997); Needles Stakes (1997); Dr. Fager Stakes (1998); Flamingo Stakes (1998); Hollywood Wildcat Handicap (1998); Spend A Buck Handicap (1998); Cup and Saucer Stakes (2000); Niagara Handicap (2000); Maple Leaf Stakes (2000); Princess Elizabeth Stakes (2000); Seagram Cup Stakes (2000); Bessarabian Stakes (2001, 2017); Coronation Futurity Stakes (2001); Fury Stakes (2001); Glorious Song Stakes (2001); Ontario Colleen Stakes (2001); Victoriana Stakes (2001); Canadian Oaks (2001); Hallandale Handicap (2003); OBS Championship Stakes (2003); Unbridled Stakes (2004); Thoroughbred Club of America Stakes (2014); Autumn Stakes (2017); Bull Page Stakes (2017); Display Stakes (2017); Eclipse Stakes (2017); Nijinsky Stakes (2017); Nassau Stakes (2018) Canadian Classic Race wins: Queen's Plate (2001)

Racing awards
- Leading jockey at Longacres Racetrack (1989, 1990, 1991); Leading jockey at Calder Race Course (1994, 1995); Avelino Gomez Memorial Award (2017)

Honours
- Washington Thoroughbred Hall of Fame (2015); Canadian Horse Racing Hall of Fame (2020)

Significant horses
- Cajun Beat, Dancethruthedawn, Mecke

Gary Dale Boulanger (born November 19, 1967) is a retired Canadian Hall of Fame jockey and trainer who competed in his native Canada and the United States.

Born in Drayton Valley, Alberta, Canada, Boulanger began his career in 1987 at Tampa Bay Downs then went to the Pacific Northwest where he was the leading jockey for three straight years from 1989 through 1991 at Longacres Racetrack in Washington state. In 1991 he won 247 races, breaking Hall of Fame jockey Gary Stevens record for most wins.

In 1992 Boulanger moved to race at tracks in California and in 1994 to southern Florida where he enjoyed considerable success. In 1998 he rode Chilito in the Kentucky Derby. From June 2000 and much of 2001, Boulanger worked primarily in Canada where he rode the most successful mount of his career. Aboard Sam Son Farm's filly Dancethruthedawn he won several top races in Canada including the 2001 Canadian Oaks and that country's most important race, the Queen's Plate.

While competing in Florida in the winter of 2005, Gary Boulanger suffered a life-threatening and career-ending injury in a racing accident at Gulfstream Park in the January 30 running of the Mac Diarmida Handicap. Called "one of South Florida's best riders the past several years" by The New York Times, Boulanger underwent surgery for a ruptured spleen, broken ribs, as well as a detached tendon in his left elbow. The accident caused a blood clot, that surgeons had to extract, which necessitated the removal of a section of his skullcap to avoid damage to the brain from pressure caused by swelling. Following a very lengthy recovery process, in April 2009 Boulanger embarked on a new career race conditioning Thoroughbreds. In September he earned his first win as a trainer at Calder Race Course. On February 17, 2013, Boulanger returned to the saddle at Tampa Bay Downs, finishing 9th aboard Spring a Latch, a horse in which he is also trainer.

In 2017 he became the 33rd recipient of the Avelino Gomez Memorial Award given to jockeys who have made significant contributions to Canadian Thoroughbred racing.

In 2020, Gary Boulanger was inducted into the Canadian Horse Racing Hall of Fame.

On September 17, 2023, Boulanger–then 55 years old–announced his retirement as a jockey, saying that it was the right time to retire and that he had nothing left to prove. He added that he would like to stay connected to the sport of horse racing in some way. He retired with 3,698 winners from 25,385 starts and career winnings of over US$83 million.

Chart (2000–present)	Peak position
National Earnings List for Jockeys 2000	48
National Earnings List for Jockeys 2001	42
National Earnings List for Jockeys 2003	48
National Earnings List for Jockeys 2013	60
National Earnings List for Jockeys 2014	70
