= Jackson Bend =

American-bred Thoroughbred racehorse

- Sire: Hear No Evil
- Grandsire: Carson City
- Dam: Sexy Stockings
- Damsire: Tabasco Cat
- Sex: Stallion
- Foaled: 2007
- Country: United States
- Colour: Chestnut
- Breeder: Jacks or Better Farm Inc.
- Owner: Robert LaPenta
- Trainer: Nick Zito
- Record: 27: 10-6-4
- Earnings: US$1,603,450

Major wins
- In Reality Stakes (2009); Frank Gomez Memorial Stakes (2009); Affirmed Handicap (2009); Dr. Fager Stakes (2009); James Marvin Stakes (2011); Forego Stakes (2011); Hal's Hope Stakes (2012); Carter Handicap (2012)
- Last updated on April 10, 2012

Jackson Bend (foaled February 11, 2007, in Florida) is an American Thoroughbred racehorse who finished third to Lookin At Lucky in the Grade I $1,100,000 Preakness Stakes a Classic U.S. Triple Crown race held at Pimlico Race Course in Baltimore, Maryland. Bred by Jacks or Better Farm Inc. in Ocala, Florida, he was out of the mare Sexy Stockings, whose sire was Tabasco Cat, a dual-classic winner in 1994.

== Two-year-old season ==
Jackson Bend started his career with five wins in his first six races, including four stakes races all carded at Calder Race Course: the In Reality Stakes at 8½ furlongs, the Frank Gomez Memorial Stakes (a 6-furlong sprint), the Affirmed Stakes at seven furlongs, and another six-furlong sprint in the Dr. Fager Stakes.

== Three-year-old season ==
In January 2010, Jackson Bend finished second in the grade three Holy Bull Stakes at Gulfstream Park at a mile on the dirt. In February, he was second in the Grade II Fountain of Youth Stakes at a mile and one eighth at Gulfstream behind Eskendereya. In April, he stepped up in class and ran second again to Eskendereya in the Grade I $750,000 Wood Memorial Stakes at Aqueduct Racetrack in New York at a mile and an eighth.

After five wins and three graded-stakes placings, owner Robert LaPenta and trainer Nick Zito ran him in the second jewel of the Triple Crown, the $1,000,000 Preakness Stakes a Grade I at Pimlico Race Course at a mile and three sixteenths on dirt. Jackson Bend broke well and stalked the leaders in third behind First Dude and Kentucky Derby winner Super Saver passing the grandstand for the first time. He continued in third along the rail down the backstretch. Around the final turn, Eclipse Champion Lookin At Lucky and Caracortado passed him on the outside. Coming down the lane, Jackson Bend swept across five paths to the outside, passing Super Saver and Caracortado. In the final 1/16 of a mile, he continued to close on the leaders and finished third by less than a length to winner Lookin At Lucky, finishing a nose behind second-place First Dude.

== Four-year-old season ==
In 2011, Jackson Bend ran second in the Grade III Skip Away Stakes at Gulfstream Park at a mile and three sixteenths on dirt. In his next race, he finished third in the Memorial Day Handicap, a $75,000 stakes race run at one and one sixteenth miles on the dirt at Calder Race Course on May 30, 2011. On July 22, 2011, Jackson Bend won the $75,000 James Marvin Stakes at seven furlongs at Saratoga Race Course in 1:20.91. On September 3, 2011, he won the grade one Forego Handicap.

== Five-year-old season ==
On January 14, 2012, Jackson Bend won the one-mile Hal's Hope Stakes at Gulfstream Park. Under jockey John Velazquez, he was angled out in the stretch drive and scored by one length over Sangaree. In April 2012, Jackson Bend won the $400,000 Grade 1 Carter Handicap at seven furlongs at Aqueduct Racetrack. As the longest shot on the board, he held off odds-on favorite Caleb's Posse to win by a nose. Preakness Stakes winner Shackleford finished another length back in third. On May 28, 2012, Jackson Bend competed in what many analysts called the strongest field assembled all year in the $750,000 Grade 1 Metropolitan Handicap (also known as the Met Mile). He finished fifth of six to Preakness Stakes winner Shackleford and Breeders' Cup Dirt Mile winner Caleb's Posse.
