= J J's Dream Stakes =

- Class: Ungraded stakes
- Location: Calder Race Course; Miami Gardens, Florida, United States
- Inaugurated: 1976
- Race type: Thoroughbred - Flat racing
- Website: www.calderracecourse.com

Race information
- Distance: 6 furlongs
- Surface: Dirt
- Track: left-handed
- Qualification: Two-year-old fillies
- Weight: Assigned
- Purse: $100,000

The J J's Dream Stakes is an American Thoroughbred horse race held annually during the first part of July at Calder Race Course in Miami Gardens, Florida. Open to two-year-old fillies, it is contested on dirt over a distance of six furlongs.

Inaugurated in 1976 as the Melaleuca Stakes, it was open to three years old fillies for its first three runnings. From 1997 through 1999, the race was run as the Masao Moriya Stakes. In 2000, the race was renamed to honor the John A. Franks multiple stakes-winning filly, J J's Dream.

Among the notable winners of this race are Princess Rooney (1982), Hollywood Wildcat (1992) and Awesome Feather (2010).
