= Edward Plesa Jr. =

American horse trainer

Eddie Plesa Jr.
Personal information
- Born: April 25, 1949 (age 77) Seattle, Washington; United States
- Occupation: Trainer

Horse racing career
- Sport: Horse racing
- Career wins: 2,480+ (ongoing)

Major racing wins
- Tropical Turf Handicap (1989); Carry Back Stakes (1994); Cicada Stakes (1996); Foolish Pleasure Stakes (1998); Acorn Stakes (1999); Davona Dale Stakes (1999); Spend A Buck Handicap (1999, 2001); Memorial Day Handicap (2002); My Charmer Handicap (2002); Endeavour Breeders' Cup Stakes (2003); Desert Vixen Stakes (1986, 2006); Holy Bull Stakes (2008), (2013); Woodward Stakes (2014); Pegasus Stakes (2015); Smile Sprint Stakes (2021)

Honours
- Calder Race Course Hall of Fame (2007)

Edward "Eddie" Plesa Jr. (born April 25, 1949, in Seattle, Washington) is a Thoroughbred racehorse trainer and owner. The son of jockey and trainer Edward Plesa Sr., he is married to Laurie and has three children including Luke, Kyle, and Kelsey. The couple currently reside in South Florida. Eddie Plesa is the brother-in-law to Smarty Jones trainer, John Servis.

Eddie Plesa is the son of Italian immigrants and was raised in Miami, Florida. His Plesa Racing Stables, is based at Palm Meadows, Gulfstream Park Racetrack's satellite training facility during the winter months and Monmouth Park in New Jersey during the summer months. He also has horses in Ocala, Florida, New York, and Maryland. Plesa's most successful horses include Three Ring, Best of the Rest, BB Best, Hey Byrn, Gottcha Gold, and Itsmyluckyday among others.

Among Plesa's diverse clientele, one includes Barry K. Schwartz, former CEO of Calvin Klein and Chairman of the NYRA. Plesa is the brother-in-law to trainer John Servis.

Eddie Plesa served a two-year term as vice president of the Florida Horsemen's' Benevolent and Protective Association, and has been elected to the board once again in 2014. In 2007 he was inducted into the Calder Race Course Hall of Fame.

As of July 2025, Plesa ranks 64th overall in all-time career earnings for trainers at $64,579,375.
