= Cornelio Velásquez =

Panamanian horse racing jockey (born 1968)

Cornelio Velasquez
Personal information
- Born: September 28, 1968 (age 58) Panama City, Panama
- Occupation: Jockey

Horse racing career
- Sport: Horse racing
- Career wins: 2,755 (through 6/13/10)

Major racing wins
- Clasico del Caribe (1992); Whirlaway Stakes (1999); Aqueduct Handicap (2000); Desert Vixen Stakes (2001); Gulfstream Park Breeders' Cup Handicap (2002); Memorial Day Handicap (2002); Oklahoma Derby (2002); Alcibiades Stakes (2003); Clasico del Caribe (2003); Alabama Stakes (2004); Clasico del Caribe (2004); Holy Bull Stakes (2004, 2005, 2007); Saratoga Breeders' Cup Handicap (2004); Adirondack Breeders' Cup Stakes (2005); Arlington Handicap (2005); Demoiselle Stakes (2005); Secretariat Stakes (2005, 2006); Sunshine Millions Fillies & Mares Sprint (2005); Bed O' Roses Breeders' Cup Handicap (2005); Ashland Stakes (2006); Hollywood Derby (2006); Jamaica Handicap (2006); Belmont Lexington Stakes (2006); Lexington Stakes (2006); Ogden Phipps Handicap (2006); Beaugay Handicap (2006); Remsen Stakes (2006); Shuvee Handicap (2006D); Stonerside Beaumont Stakes (2006); Swale Stakes (2007); Bonnie Miss Stakes (2007); Honorable Miss Handicap (2008); New York Breeders' Futurity (2009); Brooklyn Derby (2010); Manhattan Handicap (2010); Ballerina Stakes (2010); Affectionately Stakes (2012, 2013); Affirmed Stakes (2016); Damon Runyon Stakes (2016) American Classics / Breeders' Cup wins: Breeders' Cup Sprint (2003); Breeders' Cup Distaff (2005)

Significant horses
- Closing Argument, Showing Up, Nobiz Like Shobiz
- Updated on March 26, 2020

Cornelio H. Velásquez (born September 28, 1968) is a Panamanian jockey in American Thoroughbred horse racing. He was introduced to horse racing at age fifteen by trainer Carlos Salazar Guardia in his native Panama and enrolled in the national jockey school. In his first year of racing he was his country's top apprentice jockey and was the leading rider again in 1994 and 1995.

In 1996 Cornelio Velasquez immigrated to the United States to race at Elmont, New York's Belmont Park. During the ensuing ten years he competed at meets at tracks in Kentucky and Florida, winning several riding titles. His big break came in 2003 when he won his first Breeders' Cup on Cajun Beat in the Breeders' Cup Sprint. A two-time winner of Breeders' Cup races, in 2005 Velasquez rode Closing Argument to a second-place finish in the Kentucky Derby and in 2007 is scheduled to compete on the well-regarded colt, Nobiz Like Shobiz.

== Year-end charts ==
Chart (2000–present)	Peak position
National Earnings List for Jockeys 2000	62
National Earnings List for Jockeys 2001	33
National Earnings List for Jockeys 2002	17
National Earnings List for Jockeys 2003	13
National Earnings List for Jockeys 2004	11
National Earnings List for Jockeys 2005	9
National Earnings List for Jockeys 2006	9
National Earnings List for Jockeys 2007	4
National Earnings List for Jockeys 2008	12
National Earnings List for Jockeys 2009	26
National Earnings List for Jockeys 2010	25
National Earnings List for Jockeys 2011	15
National Earnings List for Jockeys 2012	16
National Earnings List for Jockeys 2013	13
National Earnings List for Jockeys 2014	13
National Earnings List for Jockeys 2015	21
