= Harry T. Mangurian Jr. =

American businessman (1926–2008)

- Born: October 26, 1926; Rochester, New York, United States
- Died: October 19, 2008 (aged 81); Fort Lauderdale, Florida
- Occupations: Businessman, philanthropist
- Spouse: Dorothy
- Parent(s): Harry T. Mangurian & Ethel Roberts
- Honors: 1995 - Calder Race Course Hall of Fame; 2002 - Eclipse Award of Merit

Harry T. Mangurian Jr. (October 1, 1926 – October 19, 2008) was an American businessman and philanthropist.

== Early life ==
Mangurian was born to an Armenian immigrant Harry Sr. and his wife Ethel Roberts of Rochester, New York. Following the outbreak of World War II, as soon as he reached the legal age Mangurian enlisted in the United States Navy. He served in the Pacific Theater of Operations 1943–1946. Following his discharge, Mangurian returned home to work in the family's retail furniture business which he would build into a national chain. Following an IPO he eventually merged the business with General Portland cement company. He also acquired First National Bank of Rochester, serving as chairman of the board of directors.

Taking up residence in Florida, in 1969 he purchased the jet charter company, Southeastern Jet Corporation, a business he operated for more than thirty years. His Drexel Investments, a real estate construction and leasing firm, is based in Fort Lauderdale.

== Sports teams ownership ==
In 1977, Mangurian became a partner in the Buffalo Braves of the National Basketball Association (NBA), buying out the share of Paul Snyder, who had owned the team for five years but was facing public feuds with the other sports teams using Buffalo Memorial Auditorium. At the end of the 1978 season, by which point he had effectively dismantled the team in a successful effort to break the Braves' lease on the Aud, he and his partner John Y. Brown Jr. negotiated a franchise swap of the Braves team for the Boston Celtics. After one season, Mangurian bought out Brown and as the franchise's owner saw the Celtics sign stars Larry Bird, Kevin McHale and Robert Parish. In the 1980–81 Boston Celtics season, his team won the NBA Championship. In 1983, he sold the club due to poor relations with Delaware North, owner of the Boston Garden.

Mangurian also became involved with the North American Soccer League (NASL) as part of the ownership of the Memphis Rogues.

== Thoroughbred horse racing ==
After becoming involved in horse racing in 1966, in 1970 he acquired the former Tartan Farms in Ocala. Renamed Mockingbird Farm, he oversaw its development into a major Thoroughbred breeding and racing operation. He notably raced two-time Eclipse Award winner, Desert Vixen. In 1979, the filly was inducted in the National Museum of Racing and Hall of Fame. Mangurian also notably owned Valid Appeal, who went on from a career in racing to become a successful sire at stud in Florida.

Mangurian was a member of The Jockey Club, the Thoroughbred Club of America, Inc., and served on the board of directors of the Breeders' Cup. He also served on the board of the Florida Thoroughbred Breeders' and Owners' Association (F.T.B.O.A.) for thirty years and founded the Ocala Breeders' Sales Company. Mangurian bred 1992 Breeders' Cup Juvenile winner, Gilded Time and was named 1988 and 2000 Breeder of the Year by the Thoroughbred Owners' and Breeders' Association

In 1995, Mangurian was inducted in the Calder Race Course Hall of Fame. In 2002, he received the national Eclipse Award of Merit, the American Thoroughbred horse racing industry's highest honor. In his mid-seventies, Mangurian cut back on his racing activities. In 2000, he sold Mockingbird Farm (now Winding Oaks Farm) and dispersed virtually all of his breeding stock.

In 1999, Mangurian established a private foundation for philanthropic purposes. After the September 11 attacks on the United States, his initial million dollar donation to the "New York Heroes Fund" helped inspire fellow horsemen such as Sheikh Mohammed bin Rashid Al Maktoum to contribute millions to that cause.
