= José A. Vélez Jr. =

Puerto Rican jockey

Jose Velez Jr.
Personal information
- Born: March 23, 1963 (age 63) Santurce, Puerto Rico
- Occupation: Jockey

Horse racing career
- Sport: Horse racing
- Career wins: 3,000+ (ongoing)

Major racing wins
- Affirmed Stakes (1983, 1990, 1991); Desert Vixen Stakes (1983, 1984, 1988, 1990); Memorial Day Handicap (1989); Endine Stakes (1996, 1997, 2009); Cliff Hanger Handicap (2000); Maryland Million Classic (2000); Monmouth Breeders' Cup Oaks (2000); Meadowlands Cup (2000); Morven Stakes (2001); Canadian Turf Handicap (2002); Philip H. Iselin Breeders' Cup Handicap (2002, 2005); Salvator Mile Handicap (2003); United Nations Handicap (2003); Arlington Classic (2008)

Honours
- Calder Race Course Hall of Fame (1997)

Significant horses
- Spain
- Updated on July 14, 2007

José Antonio Vélez Jr. (born March 23, 1963, in Santurce, Puerto Rico) is a jockey who competes in American Thoroughbred horse races.

The son of jockey José Vélez Sr., he began his riding career at Atlantic City Race Course in 1980 and won his first race later that year at the Meadowlands. He was the leading apprentice at Hialeah Park in 1982, leading rider at Gulfstream Park that year and top jockey at Calder Race Course in 1983 and 1985. Velez was inducted into the Calder Race Course Hall of Fame in 1997.

In 1998, Velez won the Meadowlands riding title. In 2000, he captured the Maryland Million Classic, the Monmouth Breeders' Cup Oaks, and the Meadowlands Cup. He rode Sei Me to a runner-up performance in the $6 million Dubai World Cup in 2002. That year he won 10 stakes races at Monmouth Park, including the Philip H. Iselin Breeders' Cup Handicap, a race he won again in 2005.

In 2003, Velez won the Grade 1 United Nations Handicap aboard Balto Star and the Grade 3 Salvator Mile Handicap atop Vinemeister.

== Year-end charts ==
Chart (2000–present)	Peak position
National Earnings List for Jockeys 2000	59
National Earnings List for Jockeys 2001	83
National Earnings List for Jockeys 2002	44
National Earnings List for Jockeys 2003	82
