= Frances A. Genter =

American racehorse owner (1898–1992)

- Born: February 17, 1898; Wyalusing, Pennsylvania, U.S.
- Died: November 24, 1992 (aged 94); Bloomington, Minnesota, U.S.
- Resting place: Lakewood Cemetery, Minneapolis, Minnesota
- Education: University of Minnesota
- Occupation: Racehorse owner/breeder
- Known for: 1990 Kentucky Derby stretch call by her trainer, Carl Nafzger; Mrs. Genter was unable to see her horse, Unbridled, winning the race due to her failing eyesight
- Spouse(s): 1) Harold Genter; 2) Earl Knudtson
- Children: Jean, Frances, Harold Jr.
- Honors: Eclipse Award for Outstanding Owner (1990); NTWA Mr. Fitz Award (1991); Canterbury Park Hall of Fame (1996); Calder Race Course Hall of Fame (1998); Frances A. Genter Stakes at Calder Race Course; Florida Thoroughbred Breeders' and Owners' Assoc. Hall of Fame

Frances A. Genter (February 17, 1898 – November 24, 1992) was a major figure in American Thoroughbred horse racing. She is best known as the owner of Unbridled, the 1990 American Champion Three-Year-Old Male Horse and winner of the 1990 Kentucky Derby and Breeders' Cup Classic. Part of horse racing lore took place at the 1990 Kentucky Derby when trainer Carl Nafzger called the race aloud to the petite 92-year-old Mrs. Genter because her eyesight was failing and she could not see her horse headed down the stretch en route to winning the race. The staff of Blood-Horse Publications selected the scene for its book Horse Racing's Top 100 Moments.

Born on a farm near Wyalusing, Pennsylvania, while in her teens the family moved to Minneapolis, Minnesota. She and her husband, Harold, became involved in the sport of horse racing in 1940. After her husband's death in 1981 she continued buying, breeding and racing Thoroughbreds with her son-in-law, Bentley Smith, managing the operation for her.

Beyond her racing success with Unbridled, over the years she won numerous top races in the United States including the 1986 Breeder's Cup Sprint with the colt Smile. Among her other top runners was My Dear Girl, voted the 1959 American Champion Two-Year-Old Filly.

She was voted the Eclipse Award for Outstanding Owner in 1990 and the following year received the Mr. Fitz Award from the National Turf Writers Association that is awarded to an individual who most exemplifies the spirit of horse racing.

She died on November 24, 1992, at her home in Bloomington, Minnesota.
