= Mind Your Biscuits =

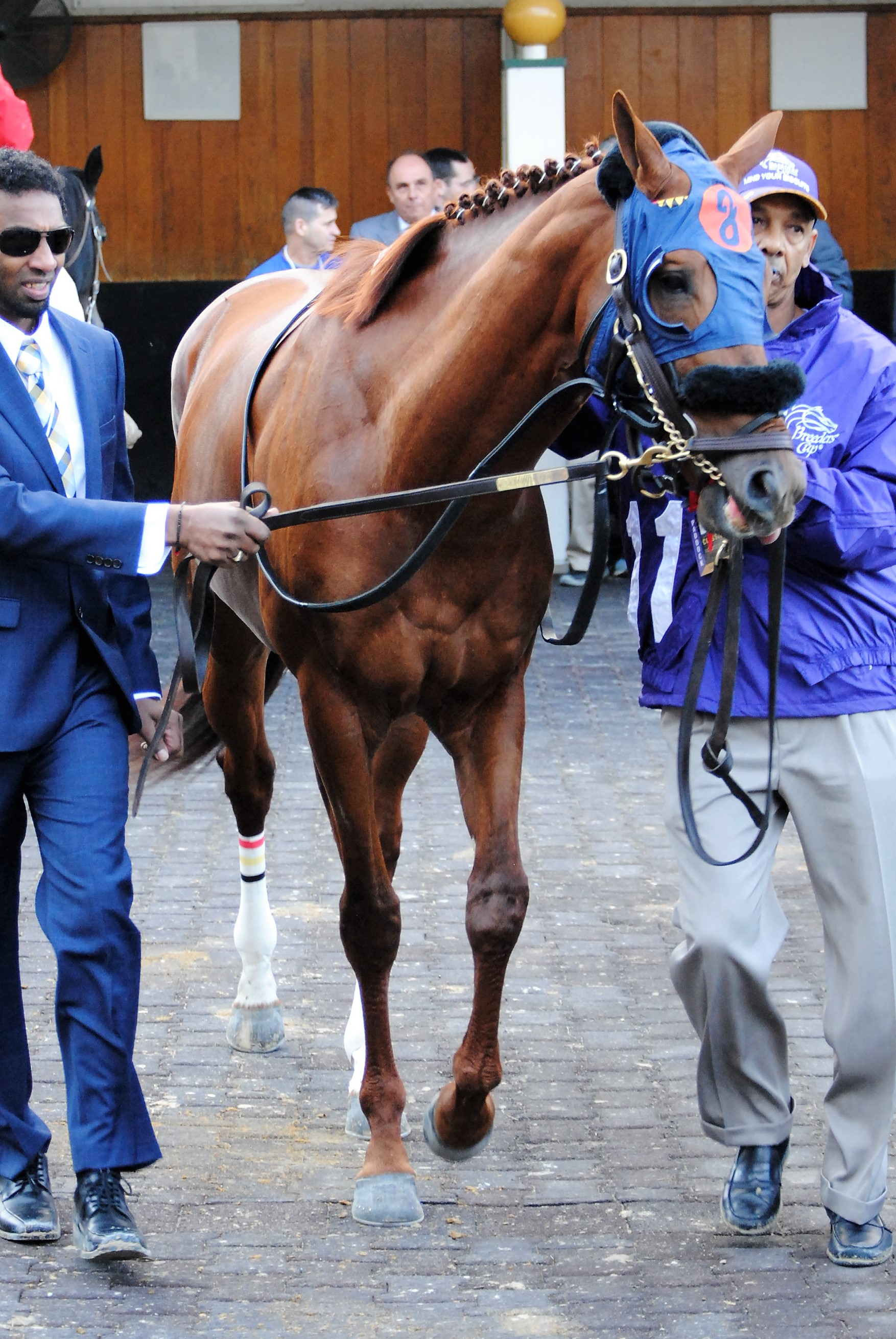
- Mind Your Biscuits at the 2018 Breeders' Cup
- Sire: Posse
- Grandsire: Silver Deputy
- Dam: Jazzmane
- Damsire: Toccet
- Sex: Stallion
- Foaled: March 15, 2013; New York, USA
- Died: June 9, 2026 (aged 13); Shadai Stallion Station, Abira, Hokkaido, Japan
- Breeder: Jumping Jack Racing, LLC.
- Owner: Shadai Farm, J Stables LLC, Head of Plains Partners LLC, Scott M. Summers, Daniel Summers, Chad Summers, Chad and Kisber, Michael E.
- Trainer: Chad Summers
- Record: 25: 8-10-3
- Earnings: $4,279,566

Major wins
- Amsterdam Stakes (2016); Malibu Stakes (2016); Dubai Golden Shaheen (2017, 2018); Belmont Sprint Championship Stakes (2017); Lukas Classic Stakes (2018)

Honors
- Mind Your Biscuits Stakes (since 2026)

Mind Your Biscuits (March 15, 2013 – June 9, 2026) was an American Thoroughbred racehorse. He was notable for winning several Graded stakes races, most notably the 2017 and 2018 Dubai Golden Shaheen.

== Background ==
Mind Your Biscuits was foaled on March 15, 2013 by Jazzmane, a mare by Toccet, and sired by Posse.

In January 2014, he was sold at the Keeneland Sale for $47,000 to Machmer Hall. He was sold later that August at the Saratoga sale, and again in April 2015 at the Ocala Sale.

== Career ==
=== 2015 ===
On August 10, Mind Your Biscuits made his career debut at Saratoga, finishing 2nd. He made three more starts in New York as a juvenile, winning none of them.

=== 2016 ===
On April 9, he broke his maiden at Aqueduct.

On July 30, he won his first graded stakes race, being the Amsterdam Stakes at Saratoga.

In November, he competed in the Breeders’ Cup Sprint, finishing 2nd. He finished his 3-year-old season with a victory in the Malibu Stakes at Santa Anita on December 26.

=== 2017 ===
On February 25, Mind Your Biscuits started his 4-year-old season with a runner-up finish in the Gulfstream Park Sprint Stakes.

On March 25, he won the first of two victories in the Dubai Golden Shaheen at Meydan. He would not make his next start until July 8, when he won the Belmont Sprint Championship Stakes.

In November, he again competed in the Breeders’ Cup Sprint, finishing 3rd. He finished the year with a 2nd place in the Cigar Mile on December 2.

=== 2018 ===
On March 31, Mind Your Biscuits would win his second Dubai Golden Shaheen after a remarkable late surge.

After two runner-up finishes in the Metropolitan Handicap and Whitney Stakes, he picked up his final win in the Lukas Classic Stakes on September 29.

On November 3, he made his final career start in the Breeders’ Cup Classic, finishing a disappointing 11th, before retirement.

== Career record ==
Date	Race	Track	Finish
2-year old
8/10/2015	Maiden Special Weight	Saratoga	2nd
9/4/2015	Maiden Special Weight	Saratoga	2nd
10/17/2015	New York Breeders' Futurity	Finger Lakes	3rd
11/14/2015	Maiden Special Weight	Aqueduct	4th
3-year-old
4/9/2016	Maiden Special Weight	Aqueduct	1st
5/7/2016	Allowance	Belmont Park	3rd
5/30/2016	Mike Lee Stakes	Belmont Park	2nd
7/4/2016	Allowance	Belmont Park	1st
7/30/2016	Amsterdam Stakes	Saratoga	1st
8/27/2016	King's Bishop Stakes	Saratoga	5th
9/24/2016	Gallant Bob Stakes	Parx Racing	2nd
11/5/2016	Breeders' Cup Sprint	Santa Anita	2nd
12/26/2016	Malibu Stakes	Santa Anita	1st
4-year-old
2/25/2017	Gulfstream Park Sprint Stakes	Gulfstream Park	2nd
3/25/2017	Dubai Golden Shaheen	Meydan	1st
7/8/2017	Belmont Sprint Championship Stakes	Belmont Park	1st
8/26/2017	Forego Stakes	Saratoga	6th
11/4/2017	Breeders' Cup Sprint	Del Mar	3rd
12/2/2017	Cigar Mile Handicap	Aqueduct	2nd
5-year-old
2/9/2018	Allowance Optional Claiming	Gulfstream Park	2nd
3/31/2018	Dubai Golden Shaheen	Meydan	1st
6/9/2018	Metropolitan Handicap	Belmont Park	2nd
8/4/2018	Whitney Stakes	Saratoga	2nd
9/29/2018	Lukas Classic Stakes	Churchill Downs	1st
11/3/2018	Breeders' Cup Classic	Churchill Downs	11th

== Stud Record ==
Mind Your Biscuits' first foal, Derma Sotogake, was considered his most successful, winning the 2023 UAE Derby and finishing 6th in the 2023 Kentucky Derby.

Foaled	Name	Dam	Sex	Notable Wins
2020	Derma Sotogake	Amour Poesie	Colt	2023 UAE Derby, 2022 Zen-Nippon Nisai Yushun
2020	Nobuno Biscuits	Meine Queen	Colt	2023 Kitanippon Shimbun Hai, 2023 Mro Kin Sho
2020	Ho O Biscuits	Ho O Sabrina	Colt	2024 Mro Kin Sho, 2024 Hakodate Kinen
2020	King Of The Nile	Veneno	Colt	
2022	Ma Puce	Films Francais	Mare	2025 Chukyo Kinen
2022	Dragon	Noble Coronet	Colt	
2023	Life Is Gravy	Red Suspender	Colt	
2023	Maruka Rapid	Vermentino	Mare	2025 Kotoji Sho
2023	Tosano Shujinko	Himuka	Colt	2025 Kin No Kura Sho

== Death ==
On June 9, 2026, Mind Your Biscuits died suddenly following breeding that afternoon at Shadai Stallion Station in Hokkaido, Japan.

== Pedigree ==
Pedigree of Mind Your Biscuits (2013-2026)
Sire Posse (2000)	Silver Deputy (1985)	Deputy Minister*	Vice Regent
Sire Posse (2000)	Silver Deputy (1985)	Deputy Minister*	Mint Copy
Sire Posse (2000)	Silver Deputy (1985)	Silver Valley	Mr. Prospector
Sire Posse (2000)	Silver Deputy (1985)	Silver Valley	Seven Valleys
Sire Posse (2000)	Raska (1992)	Rahy	Blushing Groom
Sire Posse (2000)	Raska (1992)	Rahy	Glorious Song
Sire Posse (2000)	Raska (1992)	Borishka	Roberto
Sire Posse (2000)	Raska (1992)	Borishka	Queen Maud
Dam Jazzmane (2006)	Toccet (2000)	Awesome Again	Deputy Minister*
Dam Jazzmane (2006)	Toccet (2000)	Awesome Again	Primal Force
Dam Jazzmane (2006)	Toccet (2000)	Cozzene's Angel	Cozzene
Dam Jazzmane (2006)	Toccet (2000)	Cozzene's Angel	Charming Pan
Dam Jazzmane (2006)	Alljazz (1992)	Stop The Music	Hail To Reason
Dam Jazzmane (2006)	Alljazz (1992)	Stop The Music	Bebopper
Dam Jazzmane (2006)	Alljazz (1992)	Bounteous	Master Derby
Dam Jazzmane (2006)	Alljazz (1992)	Bounteous	Mlle. Quille

Mind Your Biscuits was inbred 3s x 4d to the stallion Deputy Minister, meaning that he appears in the third generation on the sire side, and fourth generation on the dam side.
