= Sally A. Bailie =

American race-horse trainer and owner (1937–1995)

Sally Bailie
Personal information
- Born: January 8, 1937 Enfield, Middlesex, England
- Died: August 21, 1995 (aged 58) Mineola, New York United States
- Occupation: Trainer / Owner

Horse racing career
- Sport: Horse racing
- Career wins: Not found

Major racing wins
- New York Breeders' Futurity (1977); Gardenia Stakes (1981); Pegasus Handicap (1982); Count Fleet Stakes (1983); Bernard Baruch Handicap (1984, 1985); Manhattan Handicap (1984); Man o' War Handicap (1985); Kingston Handicap (1991)

Significant horses
- Tequillo Boogie, Win

Sally Anne Bailie (January 8, 1937 – August 21, 1995) was an English-born American-based trainer and owner of Thoroughbred racehorses who was one of the first female trainers to win a major American Graded stakes races.

Born in Enfield, Middlesex in South East England, Bailie grew up on a farm where she learned to ride horses. After working with racehorses in England, in 1965 she moved to the United States and settled in the New York City area where she worked as an assistant trainer. In 1970, she went out on her own and in 1977 became the first woman trainer in American racing history to win a $100,000 when her horse Tequillo Boogie captured the New York Breeders' Futurity at Finger Lakes Race Track in Farmington, New York. In 1982, she became the first woman trainer to win a $200,000 race when she conditioned the winner of the Pegasus Handicap at Meadowlands Racetrack in East Rutherford, New Jersey.

At a 1982 Fasig-Tipton dispersal auction in Saratoga, Sally Bailie paid $8,000 for a two-year-old grandson of Northern Dancer named Win. The gelding went on to provide Bailie with some of the most important wins of her career and retired with two Grade 1 wins and earnings in excess of $1.4 million. Bailie was voted Trainer of the Year for New York-bred horses in 1983 and 1984 and in 1985 became the first woman trainer to have a horse compete in the Japan Cup.

== Death ==
Sally Bailie died of cancer, aged 58, at Winthrop-University Hospital in Mineola, New York, on Long Island.
