= Mike Lee Stakes =

- Class: Restricted
- Location: Saratoga Race Course; Saratoga Springs, New York, USA
- Inaugurated: 1980
- Race type: Thoroughbred – Flat racing
- Website: www.nyra.com/saratoga/

Race information
- Distance: 7/8 miles (7 furlongs)
- Surface: Dirt
- Track: left-handed
- Qualification: Three-year-olds, New York-bred
- Weight: 124 pounds (56 kg) with allowances
- Purse: US$125,000 (2023)

The Mike Lee Stakes was the first leg of the "Big Apple Triple", a grouping of three races in New York state for New York breds. A horse who won all three of the Big Apple Triple won the purse total of $400,000 plus a $250,000 bonus. The second leg was the New York Derby held at Finger Lakes Racetrack and the third leg was the Albany Stakes at the Saratoga Race Course. The series began in 1999 and was discontinued after the 2015 running.

The Mike Lee is held at Belmont Park in the spring and is open to three-year-olds of either gender running at 7 furlongs. It currently offers a purse of $125,000. Although it is not restricted to registered New York breds, due to the racing conditions, it's still not an open race.

This race was run as the New York City OTB Big Apple Handicap prior to 1988, but in 1989 was named for Mike Lee, the former sports editor with the Long Island Press for over 40 years. The race was run as the Mike Lee Handicap through 1995.

In 2008, Tin Cup Chalice won the first Big Apple Triple by taking the Albany Stakes, the New York Derby, and the Mike Lee Handicap.

== Records ==
Time record:

- 7 furlongs – : Captain Serious, 1:20.99 (2014) (Mike Lee Stakes)
- 7 furlongs – : Clearly Now, 1:19.96 (2014) (Belmont Park track record at this distance)

Most wins by a jockey:

- 4 – Edgar S. Prado (2001, 2003, 2004, 2006)
- 4 – José Ortiz (2014, 2019, 2021, 2023)

Most wins by a trainer:

- 3 – Michael E. Hushion (2013, 2014, 2017)
- 3 – H. James Bond (2000, 2001, 2003)

Most wins by an owner:

- 3 – James F. Edwards (1984, 2000, 2001)

== Past winners ==
Year	Winner	Jockey	Trainer	Owner	Dist.	Time	Win$
2026	Sculcos Folly	Jaime Rodriguez	Richard E. Dutrow Jr.	Michael Dubb	7 F	1:21.60	$200,000
2025	Train the Trainer	Irad Ortiz Jr.	Rob Atras	Alipony Racing & Saints or Sinners LLC	7 F	1:23.92	$110,000
2024	Doc Sullivan	Javier Castellano	Michael Miceli	Tristar Farm	7 F	1:22.61	$68,750
2023	Maker's Candy	José Ortiz	Michael J. Maker	Paradise Farms Corp, David Staudacher, Maxis Stable and John Huber	7 F	1:23.35	$68,750
2022	Rotknee	Luis Saez	Michael J. Maker	William J. Butler	7 F	1:23.90	$68,750
2021	River Dog	José Ortiz	Jeremiah Englehart	Robert Reidy	7 F	1:23.88	$68,750
2020	Captain Bombastic	Luis Saez	Jeremiah Englehart	Team Hanley	7 F	1:21.94	$55,000
2019	Blindwillie McTell	José Ortiz	Linda Rice	Jerold Zaro	7 F	1:21.53	$68,750
2018	Analyze the Odds	Junior Alvarado	Jason Servis	Michael Dubb	7 F	1:22.58	$75,000
2017	T Loves a Fight	Kendrick Carmouche	Michael E. Hushion	Hoffman Thoroughbreds	7 F	1:25.06	$75,000
2016	Bust Another	Eric Cancel	Michael V. Pino	Bing Cherry Racing	7 F	1:23.94	$75,000
2015	Ostrolenka	John R. Velazquez	Todd A. Pletcher	Eric Fein and Christopher McKenna	7 F	1:23.65	$75,000
2014	Captain Serious	José Ortiz	Michael E. Hushion	Barry K. Schwartz	7 F	1:20.99	$75,000
2013	Amberjack	Junior Alvarado	Michael E. Hushion	Peachtree Stable	7 F	1:21.64	$75,000
2012	Willy Beamin	Michael J. Luzzi	Richard E. Dutrow Jr.	James A. Riccio	7 F	1:22.44	$75,000
2011	Preachintothedevil	Jose Lezcano	Gary C. Contessa	Crossed Sabres Farm	7 F	1:22.44	$60,000
2010	Friend Or Foe	Rajiv Maragh	John C. Kimmel	Chester & Mary Broman	7 F	1:21.68	$60,000
2009	Legal Consent	Ramon A. Dominguez	Carlos F. Martin	Lansdon B. Robbins, III	7 F	1:24.72	$63,300
2008	Tin Cup Chalice	Pedro A. Rodriguez	Michael A. LeCesse	Michael A. Lecesse	7 F	1:24.12	$65,820
2007	Chief's Lake	Garrett K. Gomez	Steven M. Asmussen	Vinery Stable	7 F	1:23.14	$64,620
2006	Ferocious Won	Edgar S. Prado	Richard E. Dutrow Jr.	Sanford Goldfarb, Ira Davis, et al.	7 F	1:24.84	$66,180
2005	Naughty New Yorker	Jean-Luc Samyn	Patrick J. Kelly	Fox Ridge Farm, Inc.	7 F	1:23.05	$64,800
2004	Multiplication	Edgar S. Prado	Robert A. Baffert	James McIngvale	7 F	1:22.56	$68,340
2003	Bossanova	Edgar S. Prado	H. James Bond	Lorraine & Rod Rodriguez	7 F	1:22.93	$70,200
2002	No Parole	Shaun Bridgmohan	Joseph A. Aquilino	Thomas N. Mina	7 F	1:22.60	$73,220
2001	Solar Deputy	Edgar S. Prado	H. James Bond	James F. Edwards	7 F	1:23.79	$84,100
2000	Image Maker	Jorge F. Chavez	H. James Bond	James F. Edwards	7 F	1:23.77	$74,520
1999	Hearts At Risk	Robbie Davis	Richard E. Schosberg	Albert Fried Jr.	7 F	1:23.55	$51,390
1998	Chasin' Wimmin	Jerry D. Bailey	John O. Hertler	Seymour Cohn	7 F	1:24.47	$32,850
1997	Say Florida Sandy	Richard Migliore	Robert M. Triola	Sanford Bacon	7 F	1:22.33	$32,910
1996	Carrbine Special	Robbie Davis	Angel A. Penna Jr.	Tri County Stable	7 F	1:24.24	$33,210
1995	Endsaseeket	Richard Migliore	Robert J. Reinacher Jr.	A Y Line Stable/Vogel	7 F	1:24.74	$33,300
1994	Scarlet Rage	Robbie Davis	Richard O'Connell	Very Un Stable	7 F	1:23.06	$33,870
1993	Classi Envoy	Chris Antley	Robert A. Barbara	Sabine Stable	8 F	1:37.20	$43,200
1992	Montreal Marty	Julie Krone	Flint S. Schulhofer	Vendome Stable	8 F	1:35.54	$74,400
1991	Ambassador in Love	Jorge F. Chavez	Gary J. Sciacca	Constantine P. Beler	8 F	1:38.08	$74,640
1990	The Professor	Chris Antley	D. Wayne Lukas	Team Clover Stable	8 F	1:36.80	$71,400
1989	J.R.'s Gift	Jerry D. Bailey	Herold O. Whylie	Regis Hunter	8 F	1:35.60	$72,960
1988	Notebook	José A. Santos	D. Wayne Lukas	Eugene V. Klein	8 F	1:34.00	$68,640
1987	Peggy's Dream	Richard Migliore	Stephen W. Schaeffer Jr.	Margaret Smythe	8 F	1:36.40	$42,900
1986	Landing Plot	Juan C. Estrada	Arthur Wendell	Triad Stables	8 F	1:36.20	$44,340
1985	Gallop Rhythm	Nick Santagata	William Ryan	Henry C. Miederich	8 F	1:38.20	$43,020
1984	Talc Duster	Kenny Skinner	William E. Burch	James F. Edwards	8 F	1:36.60	$43,320
1983	Father Don Juan	Frank Lovato Jr.	Stephen A. DiMauro	Mrs. Stephen A. DiMauro	8 F	1:36.40	$33,660
1982	Majestic Kat	Mary L. Russ	Roger Laurin	Lions Head Farm	8 F	1:37.00	$33,300
1981	Adirondack Holme	Ruben Hernandez	Ramon M. Hernandez	Assunta Louis Farm	8 F	1:37.80	$34,200
1980	Screenland	Jean-Luc Samyn	H. Allen Jerkens	Earle I. Mack	8 F	1:37.80	$32,280
