= Count Fleet Stakes =

American Thoroughbred horse race

Coordinates: 40°40′20″N 73°49′51″W

- Class: Ungraded Stakes
- Location: Aqueduct Racetrack; Queens, New York; United States
- Inaugurated: 1975
- Race type: Thoroughbred – Flat racing
- Website: www.nyra.com/index_aqueduct.html

Race information
- Distance: 1 mile, 70 yards
- Surface: Dirt
- Track: left-handed
- Qualification: Three-year-olds
- Weight: Assigned
- Purse: US$65,000+

The Count Fleet Stakes is an American Thoroughbred horse race run at Aqueduct Racetrack, located in Jamaica, New York, at the beginning of January each year. It is the first stakes race of the year run in New York City for three-year-olds.

Named after Count Fleet, the 1943 Triple Crown winner, the race is open to three-year-olds willing to race one mile and seventy yards on the inner dirt track.

Offering a purse of $65,000 added, the race is a prep to the Whirlaway Stakes, the Gotham Stakes, the Bay Shore Stakes and the Wood Memorial Stakes.

Inaugurated in 1975 as the Count Fleet Handicap at Belmont Park, it was run that year at a distance of one mile. In 1976 it was raced at seven furlongs then from 1977 through 1983 at a mile and a sixteenth. It has been contested at a mile and seventy yards since 1984.

There was no race run in 1982.

== Records ==
Speed record: (at current distance of 1 mile, 70 yards)

- 1:39.61 – Achilles of Troy (2006)

Most wins by a jockey:

- 3 – Jorge Velásquez (1975, 1984, 1990)
- 3 – Richard Migliore (1985, 1988, 2002)

Most wins by a trainer:

- 2 – John P. Campo (1977, 1991)

Most wins by an owner:

- 2 – Paraneck Stable (2006, 2007)

== Winners ==
| Year | Winner | Age | Jockey | Trainer | Owner | Dist. (Miles) | Time |
|---|---|---|---|---|---|---|---|
| 2012 | Alpha | 3 | Ramon Domínguez | Kiaran McLaughlin | Godolphin Racing | 1 mi, 70 yds | 1:42.83 |
| 2011 | Monzon | 3 | Edgar Prado | Ignacio Correas IV | Sagamore Farm | 1 mi, 70 yds | 1:42.42 |
| 2010 | Laus Deo | 3 | David Cohen | Anthony W. Dutrow | Fox Hill Farms, Inc. | 1 mi, 70 yds | 1:44.91 |
| 2009 | Haynesfield | 3 | Ramon Domínguez | Steve Asmussen | Turtle Bird Stable | 1 mi, 70 yds | 1:44.65 |
| 2008 | Giant Moon | 3 | Ramon Domínguez | Richard Schosberg | Albert Fried Jr. | 1 mi, 70 yds | 1:41.14 |
| 2007 | Pink Viper | 3 | Norberto Arroyo Jr. | Alan Klanfer | Paraneck Stable | 1 mi, 70 yds | 1:42.94 |
| 2006 | Achilles of Troy | 3 | Alan Garcia | Jennifer Pedersen | Paraneck Stable | 1 mi, 70 yds | 1:39.61 |
| 2005 | Scrappy T | 3 | Alan Garcia | W. Robert Bailes | Marshall E. Dowell | 1 mi, 70 yds | 1:42.41 |
| 2004 | Smarty Jones | 3 | Stewart Elliott | John Servis | Someday Farm | 1 mi, 70 yds | 1:41.42 |
| 2003 | Grey Comet | 3 | Aaron Gryder | Gary C. Contessa | Star Track Farms | 1 mi, 70 yds | 1:42.17 |
| 2002 | Iron Deputy | 3 | Richard Migliore | James A. Jerkens | Susan & John Moore | 1 mi, 70 yds | 1:41.67 |
| 2001 | Just Allen | 3 | Steve Capanas | Robert J. Seeger | Raymond Ivory | 1 mi, 70 yds | 1:43.30 |
| 2000 | Country Only | 3 | Heberto Castillo Jr. | John C. Kimmel | Morton Binn | 1 mi, 70 yds | 1:41.77 |
| 1999 | Prime Directive | 3 | Dale Beckner | Walter C. Reese | Noreen Carpenito | 1 mi, 70 yds | 1:42.41 |
| 1998 | Classic Time | 3 | Aaron Gryder | Joe Orseno | Deborah Schier | 1 mi, 70 yds | 1:40.89 |
| 1997 | Real Star | 3 | Chuck C. Lopez | Joe Orseno | Leonard Green | 1 mi, 70 yds | 1:43.15 |
| 1996 | Criminal Suit | 3 | John Velazquez | Robert Barbara | Greeley & Sabine Stable | 1 mi, 70 yds | 1:43.81 |
| 1995 | Micheal's Star | 3 | Mike McCarthy | Guadalupe Preciado | Hidden Lane Farm | 1 mi, 70 yds | 1:45.66 |
| 1994 | Sonny's Bruno | 3 | Mike Luzzi | Howard M. Tesher | Edwin H. Wachtel | 1 mi, 70 yds | 1:44.22 |
| 1993 | Prairie Bayou | 3 | Mike E. Smith | Thomas Bohannan | Loblolly Stable | 1 mi, 70 yds | 1:42.94 |
| 1992 | Thunder Rumble | 3 | Herb McCauley | Richard O'Connell | Konrad O. Widmer | 1 mi, 70 yds | 1:43.10 |
| 1991 | Three Coins Up † | 3 | Herb McCauley | John P. Campo | Pinebourne Farm | 1 mi, 70 yds | 1:44.86 |
| 1990 | Dotsero | 3 | Jorge Velásquez | James E. Baker | Burton E. Glazov | 1 mi, 70 yds | 1:42.00 |
| 1989 | A.M. Swinger | 3 | Chris Antley | P. Brian Enright | John H. Peace | 1 mi, 70 yds | 1:42.20 |
| 1988 | Delightful Doctor | 3 | Richard Migliore | William B. Cocks | Evergreen Farm | 1 mi, 70 yds | 1:42.20 |
| 1987 | Sting'em | 3 | José A. Santos | Richard Dutrow Sr. | Stephen Dennehy | 1 mi, 70 yds | 1:43.60 |
| 1986 | Bordeaux Bob | 3 | Robbie Davis | Roy Sedlacek | Marc Barge | 1 mi, 70 yds | 1:43.00 |
| 1985 | First One Up | 3 | Richard Migliore | Luis Barrera | Randoph Weinsier | 1 mi, 70 yds | 1:44.00 |
| 1984 | Lt. Flag | 3 | Jorge Velásquez | L. Douglas Amos | Cedar Copse Stable | 1 mi, 70 yds | 1:42.60 |
| 1983 | Jeff's Companion | 3 | Antonio Graell | Sally A. Bailie | Aisco Stable | 1 1/16 mile | 1:49.20 |
| 1982 | Race not held | | | | | | |
| 1981 | Triocala | 3 | Ruben Hernandez | Pancho Martin | Viola Sommer | 1 1/16 mile | 1:45.20 |
| 1980 | Degenerate Jon | 3 | Jose Amy | Joseph A. Trovato | Barry K. Schwartz | 1 1/16 mile | 1:44.00 |
| 1979 | Picturesque | 3 | Ruben Hernandez | Jose A. Martin | Harbor View Farm | 1 1/16 mile | 1:49.80 |
| 1978 | Prince Of Gold | 3 | Dave Borden | Alex A. Fiore | Kamal S. Sheena | 1 1/16 mile | 1:47.00 |
| 1977 | Make Amends | 3 | Steve Cauthen | John P. Campo | Elmendorf | 1 1/16 mile | 1:46.00 |
| 1976 | Wardlaw | 3 | Jorge Tejeira | David R. Vance | Dan Lasater | 7/8 mile | 1:22.60 |
| 1975 | American History | 3 | Jorge Velásquez | Thomas F. Root Sr. | Harry T. Mangurian Jr. | 1 mile | 1:35.00 |

- † In 1991, Stately Wager finished first but was disqualified to second.
