= New York Derby =

- Class: Restricted
- Location: Finger Lakes Race Track; Farmington, New York, USA
- Inaugurated: 1969
- Race type: Thoroughbred - Flat racing
- Website: www.fingerlakesracetrack.com

Race information
- Distance: 1 1/16 miles (8.5 furlongs)
- Surface: Dirt
- Track: left-handed
- Qualification: Three-year-olds, New York-bred
- Weight: 124 pounds (56 kg) with allowances
- Purse: US$150,000 added

The New York Derby was the second leg of the "Big Apple Triple," a grouping created in 1999 and discontinued after the 2015 running consisting of three races at three different racetracks in New York state and restricted to three-year-olds bred in New York state. A horse who wons all three of the Big Apple Triple would win the purse total of $400,000 plus a $250,000 bonus. The first leg was the Mike Lee Stakes run at Belmont Park, and the third leg was the Albany Stakes at Saratoga Race Course.

The New York Derby is held at the Finger Lakes Racetrack in Farmington, New York and is restricted to three-year-olds of either gender bred in New York state. It is run at a mile and one/sixteenth on the dirt (8.5 furlongs) and currently offers a purse of $150,000.

This race was called the New York Breeders' Derby from 1969 to 1971, the New York Derby Handicap in 1974, and the New York Derby from 1977 to date.

== Records ==
Time record:

- 1 mile - 1:41.60 : Happy Turning (1969)
- 1 1/16 miles - 1:43.02 : Hit It Once More (2016)
- 1 1/8 miles - 1:48.80 : Copper Mount (1994)

Most wins by a jockey:

- 3 - Kevin Whitley (1982, 1983, 1989)
- 3 - John R. Davila Jr. (1996, 2003, 2015)
- 3 - John A. Grabowski (2002, 2006, 2011)

Most wins by a trainer:

- 4 - Ramon M. Hernandez (1977, 1979, 1981, 1998)

Most wins by an owner:

- 2 - Assunta Louis Farm (1979, 1981)
- 2 - James F. Edwards (1984, 2000)
- 2 - Sam F. Morrell (1989, 1996)
- 2 - Barry K. Schwartz (1999, 2003)

Owner Sol Kumin has won the New York Derby twice as part of two different partnerships, in 2017 (Head of Plains Partners) and 2024 (Madaket Stables).

== Past winners ==
Year	Winner	Jockey	Trainer	Owner	Distance	Time	Win$
2026	Talk to Me Jimmy	Manuel Franco	Rudy R. Rodriguez	SEI Thoroughbreds, Rudy R. Rodriguez & Michael Imperio	1 1/16m	1:46:67	$94,400
2025	Train The Trainer	Irad Ortiz Jr.	Rob Atras	Alipony Racing & Saints or Sinners LLC	1 1/16 m	1:44.66	$93,600
2024	Pandagate	Dylan Davis	Christophe Clement	Adelphi Racing Club, Madaket Stables LLC, Corms Racing Stable & On The Rise Again Stable	1 1/16 m	1:45.63	$95,400
2023	Allure Of Money	Luis E. Perez	Michael Ferraro	Happy Face Racing Stable	1 1/16 m	1:46.82	$90,000
2022	Barese	Ricardo Santana Jr.	Michael J. Maker	Paradise Farms Corp. & David Staudacher	1 1/16 m	1:45.70	$90,000
2021	Americanrevoultion	Luis Saez	Todd A. Pletcher	WinStar Farm LLC	1 1/16 m	1:45.19	$90,000
2019	Bankit	Eric Cancel	Steven M. Asmussen	Winchell Thoroughbreds & Willis Horton Racing LLC	1 1/16 m	1:45.97	$96,091
2018	Sea Foam	Jaime Rodriguez	Christophe Clement	Waterville Lake Stable	1 1/16 m	1:46.19	$95,220
2017	Twisted Tom	Feargal Lynch	Chad C. Brown	Cobra Farms, R R Partners, Head of Plains Partners	1 1/16 m	1:44.52	$96,091
2016	Hit It Once More	Kendrick Carmouche	Gary J. Sciacca	August Dawn Farm	1 1/16 m	1:43.02	$98,490
2015	Force	John R. Davlia Jr.	Mark E. Casse	John C. Oxley	1 1/16 m	1:45.49	$96,450
2014	Empire Dreams	Manuel Franco	Thomas Albertrani	West Point Thoroughbreds	1 1/16 m	1:45.55	$96,600
2013	Amberjack	Jose L. Espinoza	Michael E. Hushion	Peachtree Stable	1 1/16 m	1:44.42	$96,480
2012	Fox Rules	Pedro Rodriguez	Michael A. Ferraro	Langpap Stables	1 1/16 m	1:45.95	$96,480
2011	Socialsaul	John A. Grabowski	Gary C. Contessa	Samotowka Stables	1 1/16 m	1:44.09	$95,640
2010	Ibboyee	Mike Luzzi	Todd A. Pletcher	Anstu Stables, Inc.	1 1/16 m	1:45.02	$96,960
2009	Pocket Cowboys	Paul A. Nicol Jr.	Scott M. Schwartz	Scott M. Schwartz	1 1/16 m	1:45.12	$95,640
2008	Tin Cup Chalice	Pedro A. Rodriguez	Michael A. LeCesse	M. A. LeCesse & Scott Vanlaer	1 1/16 m	1:45.97	$95,760
2007	Chief's Lake*	Channing Hill	Steven M. Asmussen	Vinery Stables	1 1/16 m	1:44.54	$97,800
2006	Ferocious Won	John A. Grabowski	Richard E. Dutrow Jr.	Michael Glassberg & William Vidro	1 1/16 m	1:44.92	$106,560
2005	Accountforthegold	Ray Sabourin	Mark E. Casse	Richard Simon	1 1/16 m	1:43.78	$101,040
2004	Don Corleone	Dean J. Frates	Salvatore Iorio Jr.	Carmine Iorio	1 1/16 m	1:44.76	$98,400
2003	Traffic Chief	John R. Davila Jr.	Michael E. Hushion	Barry K. Schwartz	1 1/16 m	1:44.74	$85,320
2002	Trial Prep	John A. Grabowski	Richard E. Dutrow Jr.	Hemlock Hills Farm et al.	1 1/16 m	1:45.18	$86,240
2001	Sweet Ricky	Camilo D. Pitty	Alfredo L. Callejas	Robert Perez	1 1/16 m	1:46.16	$89,320
2000	Image Maker	Filibero Leon	H. James Bond	James F. Edwards	1 1/16 m	1:44.91	$75,000
1999	David	Aaron Gryder	Michael E. Hushion	Barry K. Schwartz	1 1/16 m	1:45.40	$60,000
1998	Iron Cop	Oliver O. Castillo	Ramon M. Hernandez	Chester Broman	1 1/8 m	1:52.40	$60,000
1997	Mr. Groush	Jorge F. Chavez	H. James Bond	Rudlein Stable	1 1/8 m	1:50.40	$60,000
1996	Carr Tech	John R. Davila Jr.	Gary J. Sciacca	Sam F. Morrell	1 1/8 m	1:53.00	$75,000
1995	Demon Damon	Ramon Perez	Willard C. Freeman	Gregory D. Hawkins	1 1/8 m	1:53.20	$75,000
1994	Copper Mount	Julie Krone	Anthony R. Margotta Jr.	Saul Kupferberg	1 1/8 m	1:48.80	$75,000
1993	Sky Carr	Paul A. Nicol Jr.	H. James Bond	Virginia Kraft Payson	1 1/8 m	1:54.00	$75,000
1992	Montreal Marty	Herb McCauley	Flint S. Schulhofer	Vendome Stable	1 1/8 m	1:53.40	$90,000
1991	Excellent Tipper	Craig Perret	Howard M. Tesher	Earle I. Mack	1 1/8 m	1:50.80	$103,440
1990	Candid Cameron	Dave Penna	Trevor Swan	J. Douglas Cameron	1 1/8 m	1:49.60	$105,900
1989	Packett's Landing	Kevin Whitley	Reginald S. Vardon	Sam F. Morrell	1 1/8 m	1:51.00	$133,500
1988	Cavanagh Special	Nick Santagata	James J. Pascuma	Fran-Jay Stable	1 1/8 m	1:51.80	$128,220
1987	Embrace's Sybling**	Leslie Hulet	John Progno	Triad Stable	1 1/8 m	1:51.00	$68,460
1986	I'm Your Boy	Frank Lovato Jr.	Larry A. Kelly	Betty M. Peters	1 1/8 m	1:51.40	$69,060
1985	Another Summer	Nick Santagata	Vincent J. Cincotta	Charles R. Tringale	1 1/8 m	1:53.40	$70,740
1984	Talc Duster	Kenny Skinner	William E. Burch	James F. Edwards	1 1/8 m	1:53.60	$68,820
1983	Dr. Billy B	Kevin Whitley	Michael S. Ferraro	Lago Vista Farms	1 1/16 m	1:45.20	$50,340
1982	Shy Groom	Kevin Whitley	Stephen A. DiMauro	Dogwood Stable	1 1/16 m	1:46.60	$33,360
1981	Adirondack Home	Ruben Hernandez	Ramon M. Hernandez	Assunta Louis Farm	1 1/16 m	1:45.00	$25,200
1980	Quintessential	Frank Lovato Jr.	John P. Campo	Charles Petigrow	1 1/16 m	1:45.20	$25,815
1979	Dedicated Rullah	Jose Amy	Ramon M. Hernandez	Assunta Louis Farm	1 1/16 m	1:44.80	$23,839
1978	Fio Rito	Henry Villar Jr.	Michael S. Ferraro	Raymond LeCesse	1 1/16 m	1:46.20	$10,790
1977	Sir Prove It	Oswaldo Rosado	Ramon M. Hernandez	Bow Hill Stable	1 1/16 m	1:51.60	$10,953
1975	1976	Race not held					
1974	Rubles Brothers	Ron Fletcher	Michael J. Magde	Michael J. Magde	1 1/16 m	1:49.40	$10,500
1972	1973	Race not held					
1971	Swift Wings	Roger Cox	Daniel H. Conway Sr.	Wilhelmine Waller	1 mile	1:41.80	$3,582
1970	Lord Tibetot	Gerald Kent	Mario J. Ribarich	Mario J. Ribarich	1 mile	1:43.00	$3,788
1969	Happy Turning	Concepcion Ledezma	Daniel H. Conway Sr.	Cockfield Stable	1 mile	1:41.60	$3,782

*2007- Berry Bound finished first by a head but was disqualified and placed second.

**1987 - Jazzing Around finished first by a head but was disqualification
