= Win (horse) =

American thoroughbred racehorse, active 1982–1985

- Sire: Barachois
- Grandsire: Northern Dancer
- Dam: Par Ci Par La
- Damsire: Buckpasser
- Sex: Gelding
- Foaled: 1980
- Country: United States
- Color: Bay
- Breeder: Robert G. Wehle
- Owner: Sally A. Bailie, Frederick Ephraim, Paul Cornman
- Trainer: Sally A. Bailie
- Record: 44: 14-10-3
- Earnings: US$1,408,980

Major wins
- Rutgers Handicap (1983); Bernard Baruch Handicap (1984, 1985); Manhattan Handicap (1984); Tidal Handicap (1984); Man o' War Stakes (1985); Shergar Stakes (1985)

Awards
- New York State Horse of the Year (1984, 1985)

Win (1980-2002) was an American Thoroughbred racehorse purchased for $8,000 as a two-year-old that would retire from racing having earned more than $1.4 million.

== Background ==
Win was sired by Barachois who had modest success in racing for his prominent Canadian owner and breeder Jean-Louis Levesque. Barachois was a full brother to Fanfreluche, a 1970 American Champion Three-Year-Old Filly and Canadian Horse of the Year as well as a Canadian Horse Racing Hall of Fame inductee. Their dam was the Canadian stakes winner Ciboulette and their sire was the legendary sire of sires, Northern Dancer.

Win's dam was Par Ci Par La, an unraced daughter of U.S. Racing Hall of Famer, Buckpasser. Her dam was Marry the Prince, a multiple American stakes race winner.

Sally Bailie, who purchased Win as a two-year-old gelding in 1982, would be the trainer throughout his racing career. In 1983 she sold a one-third interest to each of Frederick Ephraim and Paul Cornman. Under New York Racing Association (NYRA) regulations, when a horse has multiple owners they must designate a "managing partner" under whose name the horse would race and has been given sole authority for all decisions that would be legally binding regarding the horse and the only person with which the NYRA would deal.

== Racing career ==
A winner of two Grade 1 and four Grade 2 stakes, Win made his racing debut as a two-year-old on November 27, 1982 at Aqueduct Racetrack, finishing seventh in a race for maidens. He returned to racing in April of 1983 and in June got his first win in another race for maidens at Belmont Park. After winning an allowance race at the same track, he ran sixth in the New York Derby at Finger Lakes Race Track followed by a fifth place finish in the De Witt Clinton Stakes at Saratoga. Dropped in class to run in allowance races, Win had two straight victories before a breakthrough runner-up result in the Grade 2 Lawrence Realization Stakes which was followed by a win in the Grade 2 Rutgers Handicap at Meadowlands Racetrack in New Jersey.

The July 1984 Tidal Handicap, a Grade 2 race on turf at Belmont Park, was run on the dirt track after rainy weather resulted in track officials determining the turf course to be unsafe. Win had previously lost several turf races when the turf was soft, not responding in such running conditions. His preference for a harder surface showed in the Tidal Handicap on Belmont's dirt track when he beat his closest rival by 11 lengths. In August Win earned the first of two straight editions of the Grade 2 Bernard Baruch Handicap. In the September 1984 Turf Classic Stakes at Belmont Park, Win lost by a neck to the great Hall of Famer, John Henry.

Both of Win's career Grade 1 victories were also at Belmont Park and both were on turf. The first came in the 1984 Manhattan Handicap then his second in the 1985 Man o' War Stakes. Retired after the 1985 season, Win would be voted New York State Horse of the Year for the second straight time.

The first ever New York-bred horse to win a million dollars was sent to a life of leisure on a New York farm. However, in 1989 Sally Bailie brought the now nine-year-old Win back to racing. From five starts he won one Belmont Park handicap race, an impressive feat given the very long layoff and his age.

Win died in March of 2002 at Tanrackin Farm near Bedford Hills, New York.

== Pedigree ==
Pedigree of Win, bay gelding, 1980
Sire Barachois	Northern Dancer	Nearctic	Nearco
Sire Barachois	Northern Dancer	Nearctic	Lady Angela
Sire Barachois	Northern Dancer	Natalma	Native Dancer
Sire Barachois	Northern Dancer	Natalma	Almahmoud
Sire Barachois	Ciboulette	Chop Chop	Flares
Sire Barachois	Ciboulette	Chop Chop	Sceptical
Sire Barachois	Ciboulette	Windy Answer	Windfields
Sire Barachois	Ciboulette	Windy Answer	Reply
Dam Par Ci Par La	Buckpasser	Tom Fool	Menow
Dam Par Ci Par La	Buckpasser	Tom Fool	Gaga
Dam Par Ci Par La	Buckpasser	Busanda	War Admiral
Dam Par Ci Par La	Buckpasser	Busanda	Businesslike
Dam Par Ci Par La	Marry The Prince	Prince John	Princequillo
Dam Par Ci Par La	Marry The Prince	Prince John	Not Afraid
Dam Par Ci Par La	Marry The Prince	Rambling Mary	Fighting Fox
Dam Par Ci Par La	Marry The Prince	Rambling Mary	Almerry (family: 4-r)
