= Big Truck (horse) =

American-bred Thoroughbred racehorse

- Sire: Hook and Ladder
- Grandsire: Dixieland Band
- Dam: Just A Ginny
- Damsire: Go for Gin
- Sex: Colt
- Foaled: 2005
- Country: United States
- Colour: Dark Bay
- Breeder: A. Lakin & Sons
- Owner: Eric Fein
- Trainer: Barclay Tagg, Derek Ryan
- Record: 10: 3-1-2
- Earnings: $336,880; $194,500 Graded Earnings

Major wins
- Bertram F. Bongard Stakes (2007); Tampa Bay Derby (2008)
- Last updated on March 15, 2008

Big Truck (February 12, 2005 – March 4, 2010) was an American Thoroughbred Racehorse. Sired by Hook and Ladder, he was a great-grandson of Northern Dancer, out of the mare Just A Ginny, a daughter of the 1994 Kentucky Derby winner, Go for Gin.

Trained until the fall of 2009 by Barclay Tagg, owned by Eric Fein and ridden by Ramon Dominguez, Big Truck broke his maiden on August 23, 2007, at Saratoga Race Course, winning by about 6 and half lengths over runner-up Post Exchange.

Prior to his next start in the Bertram F. Bongard Stakes at Belmont Park on September 23, 2007, trainer Tagg noted that Big Truck might be his best two-year-old in a barn that had many promising colts for the Triple Crown. Tagg said that Big Truck might "end up being the best out of them all," adding, "This guy's as smooth as glass."

Following Tagg's remarks, Big Truck was sent to the gate as a heavy 1/5 favorite in the Bongard Stakes on September 23, 2007. He defeated a field of 5 after dueling with the Todd Pletcher-trained colt Spanky Fischbein in the final 1/8 of the stretch, winning by about two and a half lengths.

Big Truck next raced on October 20, 2007, in the Sleepy Hollow Stakes, stretching out to one mile. Though sent off as a heavily favored 1/4, he was upset by Giant's Moon and edged out for second by a nose by Costal Drive.

Big Truck's next race was on November 24, 2007m in the $200,000 Grade II Remsen Stakes. Ridden by Alan Garcia, he was cut off by the first- and third-place finishers, Court Vision and Trust N Dustan, in the stretch. Garcia claimed foul after the race, and following a lengthy inquiry, no changes were made. Big Truck finished fourth.

== 2007 season ==
Tagg brought the Horse down to Florida in preparation for the major Kentucky Derby preps at Gulfstream Park, Tampa Bay Downs and Fairgrounds. Big Truck was put into the 7-furlong Hutchenson Stakes, which was shorter than the horse's preferred distance. Over a sloppy track, Big Truck was no factor and finished fifth.

Despite the need for graded money in order to qualify for the Kentucky Derby, Big Truck was put in the Sam F Davis Stakes at Tampa Bay Downs to regain some form and confidence. He avenged his Hutchenson loss to Smooth Air by finishing 2nd to Smooth Air's 3rd and lost by 3/4 of a length to Fierce Wind.

Big Truck stunned the racing world by upsetting 1-9 favorite War Pass in the Tampa Bay Derby. Big Truck, who sat off the pace for most of the race, turned for home outside a troubled War Pass and dueled with Atoned before winning by a neck. That win put him on the Kentucky Derby Trail, and Tagg said he would most likely ship right to Churchill in preparation for the Kentucky Derby on May 3, 2008.

In the Grade 1 Blue Grass Stakes at Keeneland Race Course, Big Truck competed early and flattened out in the stretch in his first career start on the Polytrack. Tagg was shocked by the results and didn't know the reason for his performance, although all of the main contenders including Pyro and Cool Coal Man didn't produce. With his 11th-place finish, Big Truck didn't earn any graded money.

With the defections of War Pass and Salute the Sarge from the Kentucky Derby trail, Big Truck finished the graded stakes race in 18th place, good enough to earn a start in Kentucky Derby 134 on May 3, 2008. He was ridden by Javier Castellano, who rode him in the Hutchenson Stakes, because Eibar Coa picked up the mount on Tagg's other Derby entrant, Tale of Ekati, due to Edgar Prado committing Adriano for the Derby.

In the Kentucky Derby, Big Truck broke well from the 7 post but steadied after about 6 furlongs because of hard contact with Remsen foe Court Vision. He finished 18th in the Run for the Roses.

Big Truck was rested until the August 20, 2008, running of the Albany Stakes at Saratoga, where he was in contention and fell out to finish third behind OTB Big Apple Triple Winner Tin Cup Chalice and Thatsrightofficer.

== 2009 season ==
Unraced in 2009, Big Truck was transferred from the training barn of Barclay Tagg to trainer Derek Ryan in the fall of that year.

== 2010 season ==
Under Ryan, Big Truck started in a $20,500 allowance race at Tampa Bay on January 29, 2010, where he finished last. During training, he was injured and euthanized on March 4, 2010, at Tampa Bay Downs.

== Races ==
Finish	Race	Distance	Track	Date	Jockey
1st	Maiden Special Weight	6.5 Furlongs	Saratoga Race Course	August 23, 2007	Ramon A. Dominguez
1st	Bertram F. Bongard Stakes	7 Furlongs	Belmont Park	September 23, 2007	Ramon A. Dominguez
3rd	Sleepy Hollow Stakes	One Mile	Belmont Park	October 20, 2007	Ramon A. Dominguez
4th	Remsen Stakes	One Mile and an Eighth	Aqueduct Racetrack	November 24, 2007	Alan Garcia
5th	Hutchenson Stakes	7 Furlongs	Gulfstream Park	January 6, 2008	Javier Castellano
2nd	Sam F. Davis Stakes	One Mile and a Sixteenth	Tampa Bay Downs	February 16, 2008	Eibar Coa
1st	Tampa Bay Derby	One Mile and a Sixteenth	Tampa Bay Downs	March 15, 2008	Eibar Coa
11th	Blue Grass Stakes	One Mile and an Eighth	Keeneland Race Course	April 12, 2008	Eibar Coa
18th	Kentucky Derby	One Mile and a Quarter	Churchill Downs	May 3, 2008	Javier Castellano
3rd	Albany Stakes	One Mile and an Eighth	Saratoga Race Course	August 20, 2008	Eibar Coa
