= New York Breeders' Futurity =

- Class: Restricted stakes
- Location: Finger Lakes Race Track, Farmington, New York
- Inaugurated: 1963
- Race type: Thoroughbred – Flat racing

Race information
- Distance: 6 furlongs (3/4 mile)
- Surface: Dirt
- Track: left-handed
- Qualification: Two-year-olds, bred in New York State
- Purse: $200,000

The New York Breeders' Futurity is an American Thoroughbred horse race run annually since 1963 at Finger Lakes Race Track in Farmington, New York. A premier event for two-year-old horses bred in New York State, the race is a six furlong sprint contested on dirt. It currently offers a purse of $200,000 added.

== Historical notes ==
The 1963 inaugural running was won by Prophet Wise under jockey José Olivares who would win the race again in 1967 and 1969. A 2005 inductee into the Finger Lakes Racing Hall of Fame, through 2019 his three wins is a record that has been tied but not broken.

For 1966 only, the race was split into two classes, one for colts and geldings and the other for fillies.

In 1990 a large field resulted in the race being run in two divisions.

Rudy Rodriguez rode By the Light to victory in the 2007 Futurity. Seven years later he won again, this time as the trainer of Good Luck Gus. Rodriguez earned his third win overall when he trained Dream Bigger to win the 2019 running.

== Records ==
Speed record:

- 1:09.85 @ 6 furlongs: Classic Pack (2005)

Most wins by a jockey:

- 3 – José Olivares (1963, 1967, 1969)
- 3 – Frank Lovato Jr. (1980, 1981, 1997)
- 3 – Kevin Whitley (1983, 1985, 1990)
- 3 – John Davila Jr. (1998, 2010, 2011)

Most wins by a trainer:

- 6 – Daniel H. Conway Sr. (1964, 1966, 1967, 1969, 1970, 1973)

Most wins by an owner:

- 4 – Mrs. Thomas M. Waller (1965, 1969, 1970, 1973)
- 4 – Assunta Louis Farms (1974, 1976, 1978, 1979)

== Winners ==
Year	Winner	Jockey	Trainer	Owner	Distance	Time	Win$
2025	Arctic Beast	Ricardo Santana Jr.	Michael J. Maker	Paradise Farms Corp., JP Racing Stable, David Staudacher, Zilla Racing Stable & Jennifer Rice	6 F	1:11.47	$155,667
2024	Bold Fortune	Dylan Davis	George Weaver	Fortune Farm	6 F	1:10.72	$99,220
2023	Whatchatalkinabout	Joel Rosario	Wesley A. Ward	Ice Wine Stable	6 F	1:11.92	$161,547
2022	Acoustic Ave	Manuel Franco	Christophe Clement	Reeves Thoroughbred Racing	6 F	1:11.78	$158,579
2021	Senbei	Manuel Franco	Christophe Clement	Reeves Thoroughbred Racing & Darlene Bilinski	6 F	1:10.96	$90,702
2020	Blue Gator	Reylu Gutierrez	Michael J. Maker	Three Diamonds Farm	6 F	1:12.62	$52,836
2019	Dream Bigger	José Ortiz	Rudy Rodriguez	Repole Stable	6 F	1:11.01	$122,828
2018	Dugout	Jose Valdivia Jr.	Larry Rivelli	Richard Ravin, Patricia's Hope & Larry Rivelli	6 F	1:10.66	$120,173
2017	Analyze the Odds	Chris DeCarlo	Todd A. Pletcher	Repole Stable	6 F	1:12.73	$130,125
2016	Gold For The King	Eric Cancel	Charlton A. Baker	Francis Paolangeli	6 F	1:10.95	$131,768
2015	Dr. Shane	Jamie Rodriguez	Nicholas Esler	Dutchess Views Farm (Michael Lischin & Anya Sheckley)	6 F	1:12.85	$124,178
2014	Good Luck Gus	Wilfredo Rohena	Rudy Rodriguez	Michael Dubb	6 F	1:11.87	$151,259
2013	Wired Bryan	Jamie Rodriguez	Michael Dilger	Anstu Stables, Inc.	6 F	1:10.50	$142,474
2012	West Hills Giant	Jose Espinoza	John P. Terranova lll	Robert Castelli, Andrew Cohen, Gina Bentivegna	6 F	1:12.81	$148,403
2011	Wildcats Smile	John Davila Jr.	Dominic G. Galluscio	Francis Paolangeli	6 F	1:12.65	$156,526
2010	Bug Juice	John Davila Jr.	Bruce N. Levine	Our Blue Streaks Stable (Neal Galvin)	6 F	1:10.24	$169,755
2009	Ibboyee	Cornelio Velásquez	Todd A. Pletcher	Anstu Stables, Inc.	6 F	1:12.23	$188,558
2008	Legal Consent	Dennis Carr	Carlos F. Martin	Lansdon B. Robbins	6 F	1:11.59	$191,115
2007	By the Light	Rudy Rodriguez	Richard E. Dutrow Jr.	Jay Em Ess Stable (Mace Segal family)	6 F	1:10.35	$161,520
2006	Chief Officer	Fernando Jara	William I. Mott	Zayat Stables	6 F	1:11.16	$150,311
2005	Classic Pack	Pablo Frogoso	Ramon M. Hernandez	John Becker	6 F	1:09.85	$149,040
2004	Caribbean Cruiser	Chin C. Yang	Donna M. Bireta	Star Track Farms (Peter Winston)	6 F	1:10.77	$130,415
2003	Mother's Sacrifice	Chin C. Yang	Donna M. Bireta	Star Track Farms (Peter Winston)	6 F	1:13.06	$93,518
2002	Infinite Justice	Aaron Gryder	Thomas M. Bush	Edward C. Behringer & Thomas P. Murray	6 F	1:10.86	$89,535
2001	Shesastonecoldfox	Michael Davila Jr.	Anthony Ferraro	Langpap Stable (Dennis & Deborah Petrisak)	6 F	1:11.51	$82,740
2000	Pepper Blues	Adrian Barron	L. Craig Cox	Paula Tompkins & Myreen Loveless	6 F	1:13.82	$80,077
1999	Image Maker	Chris DeCarlo	H. James Bond	James F. Edwards	6 F	1:11.40	$86,835
1998	Hearts at Risk	John Davila Jr.	Richard E. Schosberg	Albert Fried Jr.	6 F	1:11.80	$80,153
1997	Mellow Roll	Frank Lovato Jr.	Todd A. Pletcher	Anstu Stables, Inc.	6 F	1:10.40	$88,298
1996	Say Florida Sandy	Dale Cordova	Robert M. Triola	Sanford Bacon	6 F	1:12.00	$78,976
1995	Carrbine Special	Robbie Davis	Angel A. Penna Jr.	Moira Stable (Richard Rosee, et al.)	6 F	1:11.80	$93,600
1994	Key Pro	Frank Alvarado	H. James Bond	Rudlein Stable (Donald & Anne Rudder)	6 F	1:12.40	$90,000
1993	Background Artist	Paul A. Nicol Jr.	Edward C. Perdue	Stepwise Farm (Dr. Joan Taylor & Dr. Bill Wilmot)	6 F	1:12.80	$90,000
1992	Our Matthew	Michael J. McCarthy	Stephen L. DiMauro	Stephen L. DiMauro	6 F	1:11.40	$101,858
1991	T.V. Heart Throb	John Grabowski	Edward C. Perdue	Edward C. Perdue	6 F	1:11.80	$89,940
1990-1	Regalade	Michele Harris	Robert Fieldhouse	Betty Jean Murphy	6 F	1:14.60	$58,114
1990-2	Clean and Bold	Kevin Whitley	William D. Anderson	Chuckolow Stable (Philip C. Chuck & Harry Sockolow)	6 F	1:15.40	$58,714
1989	Jack Betta Be Rite	Michele Harris	John J. Lambert	Star Track Farms (Winston family)	6 F	1:11.20	$90,705
1988	Proud Puppy	John Grabowski	William R. Strange	Paul E. Labe	6 F	1:12.60	$85,287
1987	Northern Crush	Jorge Hiraldo	William J. Lisi	Betty Stiewe	6 F	1:10.60	$96,564
1986	Royal Value	Eugene J. O'Brien	Paul Magnier	Kevmar Stable (Kevin G. & Mary H. Langan)	6 F	1:13.00	$76,395
1985	B.C. Sal	Kevin Whitley	Stephen A. DiMauro	Sal L. Tufano & Stephen A. DiMauro	6 F	1:13.40	$78,502
1984	Rollick n' Roll	Leslie Hulet	Reginald S. Vardon	Sam F. Morrell	6 F	1:13.00	$80,988
1983	Impressive Gift	Kevin Whitley	William R. Strange	William F. Wilmot	6 F	1:12.00	$72,432
1982	Bix	Kenny Skinner	Sidney Watters, Jr.	William C. MacMillen Jr.	6 F	1:11.60	$67,032
1981	Salute Me Sir	Frank Lovato Jr.	John P. Campo	Arlene Schwartz	6 F	1:12.20	$64,742
1980	Always Run Lucky	Frank Lovato Jr.	John P. Campo	Rockwood Stable (Herbert Schwartz & Robert Boggiano)	6 F	1:11.60	$63,399
1979	Restrainor	Ruben Hernandez	Ramon M. Hernandez	Assunta Louis Farm	6 F	1:14.20	$61,776
1978	Dedicated Rullah	Steve Cauthen	Ramon M. Hernandez	Assunta Louis Farm	6 F	1:13.80	$60,000
1977	Tequillo Boogie	Pat Day	Sally A. Bailie	Milfer Farm (Dr. Jonathan Davis)	6 F	1:14.00	$54,285
1976	Vandy Sue	Miguel Rujano	Ramon M. Hernandez	Assunta Louis Farm	6 F	1:12.40	$26,619
1975	Krafty Doug	Joan Phipps	A. Gauthier	Leon D. Star	6 F	1:14.80	$25,386
1974	Divine Royalty	William Nemeti	Stephen A. DiMauro	Assunta Louis Farms	6 F	1:13.20	$22,050
1973	Top of the Ladder	Robert McKeever Jr.	Daniel H. Conway Sr.	Mrs. Thomas M. Waller	6 F	1:14.20	$18,279
1972	Only Jet	Terry Hickmott	Michael J. Magde	Michael J. Magde	6 F	1:13.80	$10,431
1971	Lord Ellsworth	Anthony Russo	Jerry C. Meyer	Herbert E. Wilson	6 F	1:12.80	$11,603
1970	Swift and Free	John Tartaglia	Daniel H. Conway Sr.	Mrs. Thomas M. Waller	6 F	1:14.00	$10,404
1969	Egobreeze	José Olivares	Daniel H. Conway Sr.	Mrs. Thomas M. Waller	6 F	1:13.20	$11,005
1968	Flower Bill	Ben Feliciano	Lonard H. Hunt	Seymour Cohn	6 F	1:12.80	$10,980
1967	Happy Gold	José Olivares	Daniel H. Conway Sr.	William Ewing	6 F	1:14.00	$8,795
1966-C	Jaldi Jaldi	Warren Vedilago	William H. McMath	Charles R. Leonard Jr.	6 F	1:14.00	$6,230
1966-F	Nice Princess	Oswaldo Rosado	Daniel H. Conway Sr.	Cockfield Stable (Constance Winant)	6 F	1:15.00	$6,038
1965	Without Warning	Frank Verardi	Thomas M. Waller	Mrs. Thomas M. Waller	6 F	1:14.60	$4,865
1964	Her Favourite	George Gibb	Daniel H. Conway Sr.	William Ewing	6 F	1:16.00	$3,721
1963	Prophet Wise	José Olivares	Anthony Caruso Jr.	Mrs. D. M. Signore	6 F	1:16.40	$1,856
