= Albany Stakes =

Albany Stakes may refer to:

- Albany Stakes (Great Britain), a horse race held at Ascot Racecourse in Great Britain
- Albany Stakes (United States), a horse race held at Saratoga Race Course in the United States
