= Affectionately Handicap =

Horse race held in New York, United States

Affectionately Stakes
- Class: Discontinued stakes
- Location: Aqueduct Racetrack; Queens, New York, United States
- Inaugurated: 1976
- Race type: Thoroughbred - Flat racing

Race information
- Distance: 1-1/16 miles (8.5 furlongs)
- Track: Dirt, left-handed
- Qualification: Racemares, four-years-old & up
- Weight: Assigned
- Purse: $100,000

The Affectionately Stakes was an American Thoroughbred horse race run between 1976 and 2015 at New York's Aqueduct Race Track.

The one and one-sixteenth mile listed stakes event was for fillies and mares, three-years-old and up, offering a purse of $100,000 added. Through 2004 it was a Grade III Stakes.

The race was named for the great racing filly Affectionately. She was ranked Number 81 in the Blood-Horse magazine List of the Top 100 U.S. Racehorses of the 20th Century. Affectionately was called the "Queen of Aqueduct" during her racing days.

In 1976 the race was run at one mile. In 1977, 1983, and 1985, it was run in two divisions.

== Records ==
Speed record:

- 1:41.87 @ 1-1/16 miles: Sweetzie (1998)

Most wins:

- Plankton (1980, 1981)
- Zonk (2002, 2003)

Most wins by a jockey:

- 3 - José A. Santos (1987, 1988, 2006)

Most wins by a trainer:

- 3 - Todd Pletcher (2006, 2012, 2014)

Most wins by an owner:

- 2 - Barry K. Schwartz (1982, 2007)
- 2 - Fox Hill Farms, Inc. (2002, 2003)

== Winners ==
Year	Winner	Age	Jockey	Trainer	Owner	Dist. (Miles)	Time	Win$	Gr.
2015	America	4	Junior Alvarado	William I. Mott	Bobby Flay	1-1/16 m	1:44.68	$60,000	L/R
2014	Teen Pauline	4	Irad Ortiz Jr.	Todd Pletcher	Stonestreet Stable	1-1/16 m	1:45.64	$60,000	B/T
2013	Twice The Lady	5	Cornelio Velásquez	Tony Dutrow	Michael Dubb & Scott K. Akman	1-1/16 m	1:44.05	$45,000	B/T
2012	Love and Pride	4	Cornelio Velásquez	Todd Pletcher	Green Hills Farm Inc. (Dimitrios Katsaros)	1-1/16 m	1:43.90	$45,000	B/T
2011	no race								
2010	Tidal Dance	5	Ramon Dominguez	Michael Hushion	Marc C. Ferrell	1-1/16 m	1:46.64	$39,000	B/T
2009	Yet Again	4	Orlando Bocachica	Karl M. Grusmark	Seahorse Stable (Dr. Cary Shapoff)	1-1/16 m	1:45.28	$41,622	B/T
2008	Stage Luck	4	Stewart Elliott	Thomas Albertrani	Aaron & Marie Jones	1-1/16 m	1:44.73	$49,320	B/T
2007	Great Intentions	5	Norberto Arroyo Jr.	Michael Hushion	Barry K. Schwartz	1-1/16 m	1:44.35	$42,354	B/T
2006	Bohemian Lady	5	José A. Santos	Todd Pletcher	Padua Stables (Satish Sanan)	1-1/16 m	1:46.41	$41,544	B/T
2005	Saintliness	5	Richard Migliore	Kiaran McLaughlin	Stronach Stables	1-1/16 m	1:44.89	$48,765	G3
2004	Austin's Mom	4	Pablo Fragoso	Allen Iwinski	Leonard M. Friedman, Jan Nilsen, Brom Keifetz	1-1/16 m	1:44.02	$65,760	G3
2003	Zonk	5	Charles C. Lopez	John Servis	Fox Hill Farms, Inc. Rick Porter)	1-1/16 m	1:44.58	$65,760	G3
2002	Zonk	4	Charles C. Lopez	John Servis	Fox Hill Farms, Inc. (Rick Porter)	1-1/16 m	1:42.58	$68,040	G3
2001	Pentatonic	6	Aaron Gryder	Richard E. Schosberg	Sheila Sherry	1-1/16 m	1:43.17	$66,300	G3
2000	Theresa the Teacha	5	Heberto Castillo Jr.	Deborah Bodner	John D. Stuart	1-1/16 m	1:46.42	$51,855	G3
1999	Biding Time	5	Aaron Gryder	Mark A. Hennig	Edward P. Evans	1-1/16 m	1:44.62	$50,220	G3
1998	Sweetzie	6	Julio Pezua	Rita Nash	Rita Nash	1-1/16 m	1:41.87	$50,700	G3
1997	Mil Kilates	4	Jorge Chavez	Alfredo Callejas	Robert Perez	1-1/16 m	1:44.63	$39,996	G3
1996	Lotta Dancing	5	Heberto Castillo Jr.	Claude McGaughey III	Heidi Doubleday	1-1/16 m	1:42.43	$39,024	G3
1995	Sea Ditty	4	Art Madrid Jr.	Charles Carlesimo Jr.	Arthur F. Parent	1-1/16 m	1:46.93	$50,190	G3
1994	Poolesta	5	Frank Lovato Jr.	Angel A. Penna Jr.	Malcolm E. Parrish	1-1/16 m	1:44.80	$49,425	G3
1993	Hilbys Brite Flite	4	John R. Velazquez	Robert Klesaris	Louie J. Roussel III	1-1/16 m	1:44.64	$52,470	G3
1992	Get Lucky	4	Mike E. Smith	Claude McGaughey III	Ogden Mills Phipps	1-1/16 m	1:46.00	$52,650	G3
1991	My Treasure	4	Carlos Lopez	Raul Neira	Eugene Abbruzzese	1-1/16 m	1:44.20	$54,360	G3
1990	Naskra's Return	4	Mike E. Smith	George R. Arnold II	John H. Peace	1-1/16 m	1:43.80	$51,480	G3
1989	Rose's Cantina	5	Eddie Maple	Leroy Jolley	Carl Icahn	1-1/16 m	1:42.80	$54,720	G3
1988	Tricky Squaw	5	José A. Santos	D. Wayne Lukas	Eugene V. Klein	1-1/16 m	1:45.20	$52,740	G3
1987	Squan Song	6	José A. Santos	Carlos A. Garcia	Robert Brennan	1-1/16 m	1:46.20	$56,340	??
1986	Lady On The Run	4	Angel Cordero Jr.	Bruce N. Levine	Peter Montemarano	1-1/16 m	1:46.20	$52,110	G3
1985-1	Sintrillium	7	Robbie Davis	Michael Sedlacek	Frank Stronach	1-1/16 m	1:45.60	$52,830	G3
1985-2	Descent	5	Robert Thibeau Jr.	Evan Jackson	Thielene P. Shuemann	1-1/16 m	1:45.60	$52,110	G3
1984	Am Capable	4	Angel Cordero Jr.	John Parisella	Theodore M. Sabarese	1-1/16 m	1:46.20	$59,760	G3
1983-1	Polite Rebuff	4	Frank Lovato Jr.	Michael Kay	El Rancho Murietta	1-1/16 m	1:43.80	$32,880	G3
1983-2	Adept	4	Karen Rogers	Frank I. Wright	Nelson Bunker Hunt	1-1/16 m	1:43.40	$32,880	G3
1982	Perfect Poppy	5	Victor Molina	Joseph Trovato	Barry K. Schwartz	1-1/16 m	1:48.60	$33,960	G3
1981	Plankton	5	Ruben Hernandez	Howard M. Tesher	H. Joseph Allen	1-1/16 m	1:45.40	$34,380	G3
1980	Plankton	4	Ruben Hernandez	Howard M. Tesher	Frederick K. Tesher	1-1/16 m	1:45.00	$35,100	G3
1979	Kit's Double	6	Antonio Graell	Jose A. Martin	Moreton Binn	1-1/16 m	1:48.60	$33,150	G3
1978	One Sum	4	Ruben Hernandez	Luis Barrera	Charles T. Wilson Jr.	1-1/16 m	1:44.80	$32,910	G3
1977-1	Shy Dawn	6	Daryl Montoya	Woodrow Sedlacek	Jacques D. Wimpfheimer	1-1/16 m	1:45.20	$31,620	G3
1977-2	Illiterate	5	Steve Cauthen	Jan H. Nerud	Tartan Stable	1-1/16 m	1:45.20	$31,770	G3
1976	Proud Delta	4	Jorge Velásquez	Peter M. Howe	Montpelier	1 m	1:37.40	$34,650	Ungraded
