= Tin Cup Chalice =

Thoroughbred racehorse

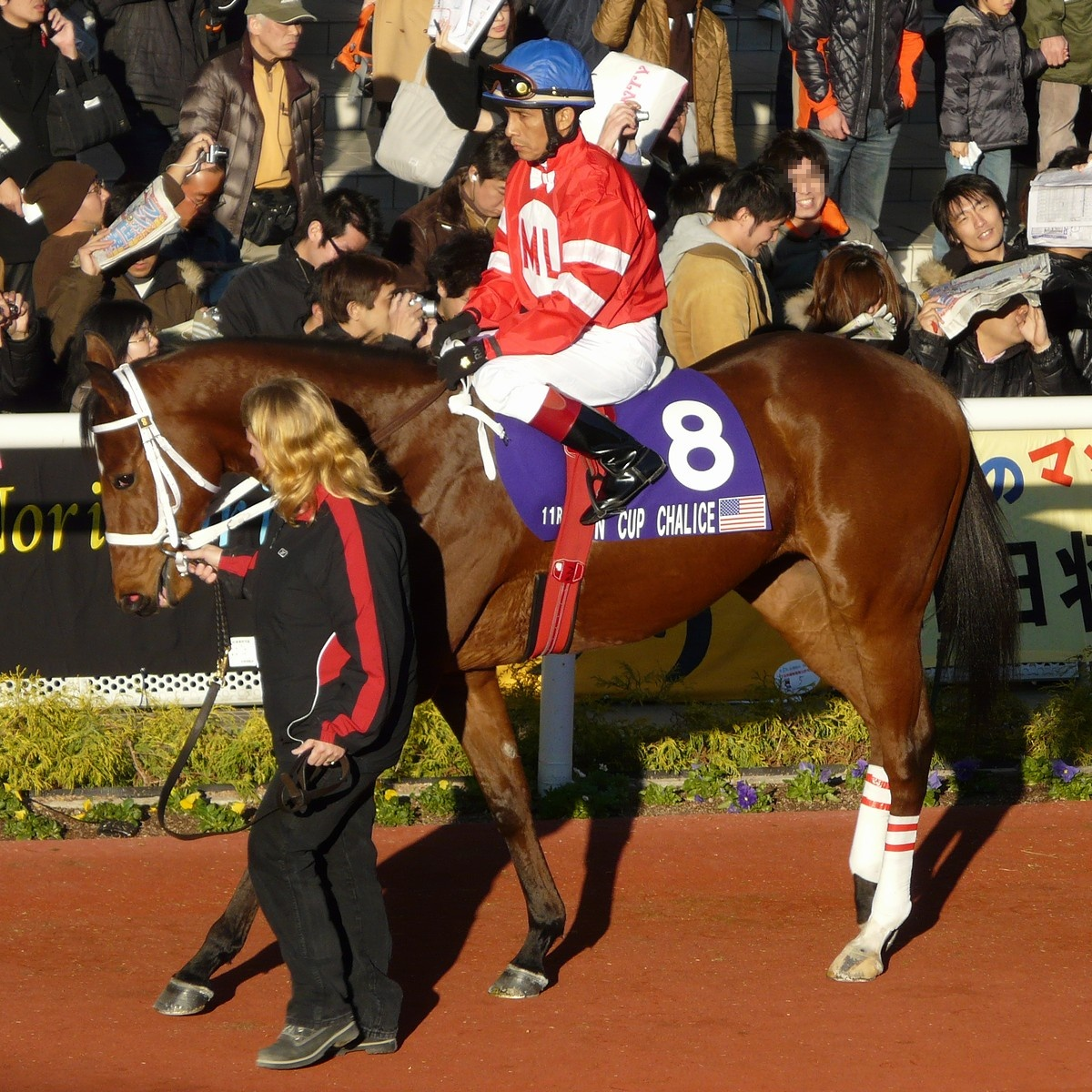
- Sire: Crusader Sword
- Grandsire: Damascus
- Dam: Twice Forbidden
- Damsire: Spectacular Bid
- Sex: Gelding
- Foaled: 2005
- Country: United States
- Colour: Bay
- Breeder: Mike Lecesse
- Owner: Scott van Laer & Mike Lecesse
- Trainer: Mike Lecesse
- Record: 10 Starts: 8 – 1 - 0
- Earnings: $868,680

Major wins
- Finger Lakes Juvenile (2007); Mike Lee Stakes (2008); New York Derby (2008); Albany Stakes (2008); Indiana Derby (2008)

Awards
- First winner of the OTB Big Apple Triple; Finger Lakes Horse of the Year for 2008; New York State Champion 3-Year-Old Male (2008)

Tin Cup Chalice (April 3, 2005 – April 17, 2009), was an American Thoroughbred racehorse who, in 2008, became the first New York-bred to win New York's “OTB Big Apple Triple" of Racing: the Mike Lee Stakes, the New York Derby, and the Albany Stakes.

== Pedigree ==
Tin Cup Chalice was a black-pointed bay sired by the Grade I winner Crusader Sword, a son of Damascus by Sword Dancer. Tin Cup Chalice's name comes from a Jimmy Buffett song. Crusader Sword was the only son of Damascus to stand in the northeastern United States. Tin Cup Chalice's dam was Twice Forbidden, from the first New York crop of Spectacular Bid after his relocation from Claiborne Farm to Milfer Farm in Unadilla, New York, in 1992. Twice Forbidden also produced the stakes winners Mr. Fantasy and Don Corleone. Damascus and Spectacular Bid were both named Horse of the Year.

Tin Cup Chalice was offered for $2,000 at the New York Breeders’ Sales Company October 2005 mixed sale.

As a colt, Tin Cup Chalice nearly died twice before the age of one, on separate occasions contracting botulism and horse colic. He can trace his lineage to the same female family as Silky Sullivan. Despite his pedigree, he failed to attract a bid at the 2006 New York Breeders Sale at Saratoga.

Tin Cup Chalice would eventually make his home base at Finger Lakes race track.

== Racing accomplishments ==
Tin Cup Chalice began his career at Finger Lakes where he won his first four starts, including the Finger Lakes Juvenile Stakes as a two-year-old. He made his first start away from his home track in the Mike Lee Stakes at Belmont Park, capturing the first leg of the Big Apple Triple. Following that victory, he returned to Finger Lakes for the New York Derby, remaining undefeated in winning the second leg of the series. He would next travel to famed Saratoga Race Course and compete in the toughest race of his career in an attempt to complete the series. His co-owner, breeder and trainer, Lecesse of Farmington, New York, said, "I know one thing. I wouldn't bet against a horse that's undefeated." In the Albany Stakes, ridden by regular jockey Pedro Rodriguez, he defeated Icabad Crane and Big Truck, both recently off the United States Triple Crown of Thoroughbred Racing trail, becoming the first (and only) winner of the Big Apple Triple.

Following his sweep of the Big Apple Triple, his undefeated streak was ended with a defeat in the Step Nicely Stakes at Belmont Park. Undeterred by defeat, he made his next start his first outside of New York and in graded stakes company, winning the Indiana Derby against the likes of the deep closer Pyro (who came up fast to place), clicking off splits of :23.20, :48.20 and 1:13.40.

== Japan Cup Dirt ==
In October 2008, the trainer and co-owner Mike LeCesse was contacted by Japanese racing officials about an all expenses paid trip for Tin Cup Chalice to compete in the Japan Cup Dirt (JPN-G1). The race, worth US$2.4 million, was scheduled for December 7 at Hanshin Racecourse. The Japan Cup Dirt is run clockwise around the oval (as many English races are run, and as American races once were run before the American Revolutionary War) so Tin Cup Chalice was tested, as required by the Japan Racing Club, to determine his ability to adapt to running in the opposite direction. That workout, held November 5, was successful and he was shipped to Japan, arriving after a 24-hour flight from Rochester, New York on November 20, 2008.

At the Hanshin Racecourse on December 1, 2008, Tin Cup Chalice worked 5 furlongs in 59.10 seconds. While Pedro Rodriguez has been the regular rider for Tin Cup Chalice and was to travel to Japan, he encountered Visa/Passport issues and was not successful in obtaining a permit. Accordingly Edgar Prado, already in Japan for the World Super Jockey Series, picked up the mount and worked with the New York-bred in the days prior to the Japan Cup Dirt. Tin Cup Chalice took the lead for the first half of the Japan Cup Dirt, but gave way shortly after that. He came in 13th out of 16 horses in the Japan Cup Dirt race. He went off at odds of 9-to-1 making him the fourth-favored of the 16 entrants.

== Death ==
On April 17, 2009, while in training at Finger Lakes Gaming and Race Track, Tin Cup Chalice suffered a spinal injury in a head-on collision with a runaway colt named Zany, a 4-year-old son of War Chant at about 6:20 am EST. Despite more than 90 minutes of care and treatment on the track, the decision was made to euthanize Tin Cup Chalice when it became apparent to veterinarian Brendan Warrell that the injuries were catastrophic. Zany suffered crippling injuries and was euthanized not long after Warrell arrived at the scene.

Tin Cup Chalice's jockey, Pedro Rodriguez was treated and released from the hospital. Zany's exercise rider, Jeannie Cook, was not injured.

Tin Cup Chalice had been entered to race that opening day for Finger Lakes but because of the small field—just five—it did not fill and the race did not go off. The plan then was to run him in a stakes race at Mountaineer Park May 10. Co-owner Mike Lecesse was quoted as saying: "If he would have been in [the race] today, he wouldn't have been on the track this morning. It's nobody's fault."

Tin Cup Chalice was transported to Cornell University's equine hospital for a necropsy, part of insurance requirements. His ashes will be buried in the track's infield, not far from the finish line near the grave of the track's first big star, Fio Rito. Fio Rito was owned by LeCesse's father, Raymond.
