= Bertram F. Bongard Stakes =

The Bertram F. Bongard Stakes is a listed stakes race for Thoroughbred two-year-olds run in the fall at Belmont Park, New York.

At a distance of 7 furlongs, it will be in its 39th running in 2016. The Bongard is a major prep race for up-and-coming young horses and offers a purse of $150,000. Though not restricted to New York-bred horses, this is not an open race: it is considered an event on the New York-bred schedule.

This race was run at a mile and an eighth before 1983 and also from 1984 to 1988. It was run at seven furlongs in 1983, and from 1996 to the present. It was set at a mile and a sixteenth from 1989 to 1993 and at six furlongs in 1994 and 1995. Run for three-year-olds and older before 1984, it is now run for two-year-olds only.

Named for Bertram F. Bongard, who was a founding director of the Eastern New York Thoroughbred Breeders' Association, initially run for three-year-olds and older until 1984, but it is now strictly for two-year-olds. Before 1984, it was called the Bertram F. Bongard Handicap.

Winner of the Kentucky Derby and the Preakness Stakes, Funny Cide, won this race in 2003.

== Past winners ==
- 2025 – Spirit Of New York (Manuel Franco)
- 2024 – Sacrosanct (Manuel Franco)
- 2023 – El Grande O (José Ortiz)
- 2022 – Jackson Heights (Javier Castellano)
- 2021 – Shipsational (Luis Saez)
- 2020 – Hold the Salsa (Junior Alvarado)
- 2019 – Cleon Jones (Irad Ortiz Jr.)
- 2018 – Frosted Ice (Joel Rosario)
- 2017 – Battle Station (Kendrick Carmouche)
- 2016 – Mirai (José Ortiz)
- 2015 – Sudden Surprise (John R. Velazquez)
- 2014 – Saratoga Heater (Joel Rosario)
- 2013 – Wired Bryan (John Velazquez)
- 2012 – Weekend Hideaway
- 2011 – RACE NOT RUN?
- 2010 – RACE NOT RUN
- 2009 – Make Note
- 2008 – Trinity Magic (Shaun Bridgmohan)
- 2007 – Big Truck (Ramon Domínguez)
- 2006 – I'm A Numbers Guy (Stewart Elliott)
- 2005 – Sharp Humor (Edgar Prado)
- 2004 – Up Like Thunder (Javier Castellano)
- 2003 – Flagshipenterprise (Mark Guidry)
- 2002 – Funny Cide (José A. Santos)
- 2001 – White Ibis (Robbie Davis)
- 2000 – Le Grande Danseur (Jorge Chavez)
- 1999 – Image Maker (Jorge Chavez)
- 1998 – David (Aaron Gryder)
- 1997 – Ruby Hill (José A. Santos)
- 1996 – Patent Pending (Robbie Davis)
- 1995 – Out To Win (Julie Krone)
- 1994 – Cyrano (Mike E. Smith)
- 1993 – Bit of Puddin (Mike E. Smith)
- 1992 – Over the Brink (Aaron Gryder)
- 1991 – Phantom Finn (Eddie Maple)
- 1990 – Well Well Well (Diane Nelson)
- 1989 – Applebred (Jean-Luc Samyn)
- 1988 – Gold Oak (Eddie Maple)
- 1987 – Notebook (José A. Santos)
- 1986 – Sweet Envoy (Jacinto Vásquez)
- 1985 – Wild Wood (Michael Venezia)
- 1984 – Hot Debate (Don MacBeth)
- 1983 – Master Digby (Ángel Cordero Jr.)
- 1982 – Fearless Leader (Don MacBeth)
- 1981 – Accipiter's Hope (Cash Asmussen)
- 1980 – Fio Rito (Leslie Hulet)
- 1979 – International (Jorge Velásquez)
- 1978 – Judging Man (Ángel Cordero Jr.)
