= Mary Russ =

Horse racing firsts

Personal information
- Born: c. 1953 Tampa, Florida
- Occupation: Jockey

Horse racing career
- Sport: Horse racing
- Career wins: 520

Major racing wins
- Sunny Isle Handicap (1982); New York City Big Apple OTB Handicap (1982); Albany Stakes (1982); Gulfstream Park Handicap (1982); Widener Handicap (1982); Criterium Stakes (1983); Appleton Handicap (1985); Phoenix Stakes (1985); Brave Raj Stakes (1993); Calder Derby (1993); Carry Back Stakes (1993); Dr. Fager Stakes (1993); Fast Hilarious Handicap (1993); Memorial Day Handicap (1993)

Racing awards
- Tropical Park Champion Jockey (1982, 1992)

Honors
- Calder Race Course Hall of Fame (2003)

Significant horses
- Lord Darnley, Majestic Kat, Smart and Sharp

Mary L. Russ (born c. 1953 in Tampa, Florida) is a retired jockey in Thoroughbred horse racing who was the first female rider in North America to win a Grade 1 race, the first to earn more than $1 million in purses in a season, and the first to win a major race meet. She was inducted into the Calder Race Course Hall of Fame in 2003. While still an apprentice, on February 28, 1982, Mary Russ became the first female jockey to win a Grade 1 race when she captured the 1982 edition of the Widener Handicap aboard Lord Darnley, trained by Roger Laurin, at Hialeah Park in Florida. That same year, aboard Majestic Cat, she won the 1982 New York City Big Apple OTB Handicap and the Albany Stakes, two of the three races that would comprise the Big Apple Triple.

She is married to Rick Tortora, son of trainer Manny Tortora.
