= Farmington Quaker Crossroads Historic District =

Historic district in New York, United States

- U.S. National Register of Historic Places
- U.S. Historic district
- Location within New York Location within the United States
- Location: Cty Rd. 8 at Sheldon Rd., Farmington, New York
- Coordinates: 43.02863°N 77.32077°W
- Area: 30 acres (12 ha)
- Built: 1796
- Architect: Brundage, D.C.
- Architectural style: Early Republic, Late Victorian
- MPS: Freedom Trail, Abolitionism, and African American Life in Central New York MPS
- NRHP reference No.: 07000384
- Added to NRHP: April 25, 2007

Farmington Quaker Crossroads Historic District is a national historic district located at Farmington in Ontario County, New York, United States. The district encompasses 11 contributing components and three non-contributing components. The centerpiece of the district is the Farmington Friends Meetinghouse, an Orthodox Quaker meetinghouse built in 1876, with a commemorative tablet marking the sites of meetinghouses built in 1796 and 1804, but later demolished. Also in the district is an 1816 Quaker Meetinghouse constructed by the Hicksite Quakers and currently under restoration.

It was listed on the National Register of Historic Places in 2007.
