= Thunder Rumble =

American-bred Thoroughbred racehorse

- Sire: Thunder Puddles
- Grandsire: Speak John
- Dam: Lyphette
- Damsire: Lyphard
- Sex: Stallion
- Foaled: 1989
- Country: United States
- Colour: Bay
- Breeder: Braeburn Farm
- Owner: Braeburn Farm
- Trainer: 1) Richard O'Connell; 2) Chris Speckert
- Record: 19: 8-0-1
- Earnings: US$1,047,552

Major wins
- Count Fleet Stakes (1992); Jim Dandy Stakes (1992); Montauk Handicap (1992); Travers Stakes (1992); Saratoga Cup (1994)

Honours
- Thunder Rumble Stakes at Aqueduct Racetrack

Thunder Rumble (1989 – January 6, 2015) was an American Thoroughbred racehorse that The Blood-Horse called a "sensation at Saratoga" race course for his performances there in 1992.

Bred and raced by Konrad Widmer and his daughter Ursula under their Braeburn Farm banner, Thunder Rumble was trained by Richard O'Connell. As a three-year-old in 1992, Thunder Rumble missed the U.S. Triple Crown series due to a virus. However, the colt had an outstanding year. He won the Count Fleet Stakes at Aqueduct Racetrack and at Saratoga captured the Montauk Handicap, the Grade II Jim Dandy Stakes and then became the first New York-bred horse in 125 years to win the Grade I Travers Stakes. Laid up for almost six months from an injury following a seventh-place finish in the 1992 Breeders' Cup Classic, Thunder Rumble ran without success in four races in California under trainer Chris Speckert. Returned to New York and trainer Richard O'Connell, on July 20, 1994, he won a seven-furlong allowance race by three and a half lengths, then won the August 6 Saratoga Cup by four lengths, beating the likes of Belmont Stakes winner Colonial Affair and Pistols and Roses.

Retired to stud duty for the 1995 season, Thunder Rumble sired a few good runners, including stakes winner, Frisky Thunder. Pensioned at Keane Stud, in Armenia, New York in 2006, in 2009 he was sent to Joann and Mark Pepper's farm in Greenfield Center, New York, who operate Old Friends at Cabin Creek: The Bobby Frankel Division. The Thoroughbred retirement facility is a satellite operation of Old Friends Equine in Georgetown, Kentucky.

Part of the New York Stallion Series, the Thunder Rumble Stakes at Aqueduct Racetrack is named in his honor.

On January 6, 2015, Thunder Rumble died of complications from colic, at Old Friends in Saratoga. He was 26.
