= Achilles of Troy =

- Sire: Notebook
- Grandsire: Well Decorated
- Dam: Steamy Recipe
- Damsire: Relaunch
- Sex: Stallion
- Foaled: 2003
- Country: United States
- Colour: Grey
- Breeder: Glen Hill Farm
- Owner: Paraneck Stable
- Trainer: Jennifer Pedersen; Frank Amonte, Jr.
- Earnings: $134,577

Major wins
- Whirlaway Stakes (2006); Count Fleet Stakes (2006)
- Last updated on February 4, 2016

Achilles of Troy is a thoroughbred horse. As a foal in 2003, he was a possible contender for the U.S. Triple Crown in 2006 but on April 5, 2006, it was announced that soreness had sidelined the colt from the Kentucky Derby and the Triple Crown.

== Connections ==
Achilles of Troy is owned by Paraneck Stable. He was originally trained by Jennifer Pedersen but three days prior to the Gotham Stakes, former Paraneck Stables owner and presently authorized agent Ernie Paragallo switched trainers to Frank Amonte Jr. After the Gotham, Amonte lost his trainers license after he tested positive for an opiate. The horse has been ridden in all of his starts by Ramon A. Dominguez.

== Breeding ==
He was bred in Kentucky by Leonard H. Lavin, who owned Glen Hill Farm, a breeding ground for thoroughbreds. His sire is Notebook and his dam is Steamy Recipe.

== Races ==
=== 2006 ===
- 5th, Gotham Stakes, Grade III, Aqueduct Racetrack, One and One-Sixteenth Miles, Fast Dirt Track, March 18, 2006.
- 1st, Whirlaway Stakes, Aqueduct Racetrack, One and One-Sixteenth Miles, Fast Dirt Track, February 11, 2006.
- 1st, Count Fleet Stakes, Aqueduct Racetrack, One Mile and Seventy Yards, Fast Dirt Track, January 7, 2006.

=== 2005 ===
- 1st, Maiden, Aqueduct Racetrack, Six Furlongs, Sloppy Dirt Track, December 29, 2005.
- 4th, Maiden, Aqueduct Racetrack, One and One-Sixteenth Miles, Good Dirt Track, December 10, 2005.
- 2nd, Maiden, Aqueduct Racetrack, One and One-Eighth Miles, Fast Dirt Track, November 4, 2005.
- 3rd, Maiden, Belmont Park, Six Furlongs, Fast Dirt Track, October 20, 2005.
