= Albany Stakes (United States) =

- Class: Restricted
- Location: Saratoga Race Course; Saratoga Springs, New York, USA
- Inaugurated: 1969
- Race type: Thoroughbred – Flat racing
- Website: www.nyra.com/saratoga/

Race information
- Distance: 1 1/8 miles (9 furlongs)
- Surface: Dirt
- Track: left-handed
- Qualification: Three-year-olds, New York-bred
- Weight: 124 pounds (56 kg) with allowances
- Purse: US$250,000 added

The Albany Stakes is an American Thoroughbred horse race that is held at the Saratoga Race Course and is open to Thoroughbred three-year-old horses of either gender bred in New York state. It is run at a mile and one eighth on the dirt and currently offers a purse of $250,000.

The Albany was the third and final leg of the "Big Apple Triple", a grouping of three races in New York for horses bred in that state. A horse who won all three of the Big Apple Triple wins the purse total of each race plus a $250,000 bonus. The first leg was the Mike Lee Stakes run at Belmont Park, and the second leg was the New York Derby at Finger Lakes Race Track. The series began in 1999 and was discontinued after the 2015 running.

Run since 1978, the Albany was held at Belmont Park in 1981, at Aqueduct Race Track in 1980 and from 1982 to 1985.

In 2008, Tin Cup Chalice won the first Big Apple Triple. Tin Cup Chalice came into the Albany Stakes unbeaten in her first six starts. She came out the first-ever winner of the Big Apple Triple, an accomplishment still unmatched through 2017.

== Records ==
Time record:

- 1 1/8 miles – Prospector's Flag, 1:48.73 (1993) (Albany Stakes)
- 1 1/8 miles – Lawyer Ron, 1:46.64 (2007) (Saratoga track record at this distance)

Most wins by a jockey

- 3 – Jerry D. Bailey (1989, 1993, 2002)
- 3 – Jorge F. Chavez (1990, 1996, 1997)
- 3 – Edgar Prado (2000, 2001, 2010)

Most wins by a trainer:

- 3 – Gary J. Sciacca (1990, 1996, 2016)
- 3 – Christophe Clement (2018, 2023, 2024)
- 3 – Steven M. Assumssen (2002, 2020, 2025)

Most wins by an owner:

- 2 – Assunta Louis Farm (1979, 1985)
- 2 – James F. Edwards (1989, 2001)

== Past winners ==
Year	Winner	Jockey	Trainer	Owner	Dist.	Time	Win$
2025	Iron Dome	José Ortiz	Steven M. Asumssen	L and N Racing LLC & Chester Broman, Sr.	1 1/8m	1:51.78	$137,500
2024	Pandagate	Dylan Davis	Christophe Clement	Adelphi Racing Club, Madaket Stables, Corms Racing Stable & On The Rise Again Stable	1 1/8m	1:51.11	$137,500
2023	Drake's Passage	Manuel Franco	Christophe Clement	Robert S. Evans	1 1/8 m	1:50.95	$137,500
2022	Bossmakinbossmoves	Irad Ortiz Jr.	Richard E. Schosburg	Clear Star Stable, Mitre Box Stable, & Richard E. Schosburg	1 1/8 m	1:51.29	$90,000
2021	Americanrevolution	Luis Saez	Todd A. Pletcher	WinStar Farm & China Horse Club	1 1/8 m	1:49.94	$137,500
2020	Chestertown	José Ortiz	Steven M. Asmussen	West Point Thoroughbreds, Woodford Racing, Chester Broman Sr. & Mary Broman	1 1/8 m	1:49.37	$82,000
2019	Funny Guy	Rajiv Maragh	John P. Terranova, II	Gatsas Stables, R. A. Hill Stable, & Swick Stable	1 1/8 m	1:49.35	$137,500
2018	Sea Foam	Joel Rosario	Christophe Clement	Waterville Lake Stable	1 1/8 m	1:50.24	$137,500
2017	Twisted Tom	Javier Castellano	Chad C. Brown	Cobra Farms, R R Partners, & Head of Plains Partners	1 1/8 m	1:50.25	$150,000
2016	Hit It Once More	Kendrick Carmouche	Gary J. Sciacca	August Dawn Farm	1 1/8 m	1:50.38	$150,000
2015	Good Luck Gus	Luis Saez	Rudy R. Rodriguez	Michael Dubb, Bethlehem Stables LLC, The Elkstone Group LLC	1 1/8 m	1:50.81	$150,000
2014	So Lonesome	Jose Lezcano	Thomas M. Bush	Patricia Schuler	1 1/8 m	1:50.17	$150,000
2013	Escapefromreality	Javier Castellano	Dominick A. Schettino	MeB Racing Stables LLC & Brooklyn Boyz Stables	1 1/8 m	1:51.61	$90,000
2012	Willy Beamin	Alan Garcia	Richard E. Dutrow Jr.	James A. Riccio	1 1/8 m	1:50.34	$90,000
2011	Bigger Is Bettor	Abel Lezcano	Rodrigo A. Ubillo	Chester & Mary Broman	1 1/8 m	1:51.12	$60,000
2010	Stormy's Majesty	Edgar Prado	Dominic G. Galluscio	Majesty Stud	1 1/8 m	1:50.55	$60,000
2009	Fiddlers Afleet	Ramon A. Dominguez	Michael E. Hushion	Marc C. Ferrell	1 1/8 m	1:49.78	$90,000
2008	Tin Cup Chalice	Pedro A. Rodriguez	Michael A. LeCesse	M. A. LeCesse & Scott Vanlaer	1 1/8 m	1:51.33	$340,000
2007	Stunt Man	Ramon A. Dominguez	Gary C. Contessa	Winning Move Stable	1 1/8 m	1:51.23	$90,000
2006	Indian Hawke	José A. Santos	George R. Weaver	Donald Flanagan	1 1/8 m	1:51.44	$90,000
2005	Naughty New Yorker	Jean-Luc Samyn	Patrick J. Kelly	Fox Ridge Farm, Inc.	1 1/8 m	1:50.88	$90,000
2004	West Virginia	John R. Velazquez	Todd A. Pletcher	Donald & Roberta Mary Zuckerman	1 1/8 m	1:50.42	$102,150
2003	Traffic Chief	José A. Santos	Michael E. Hushion	Barry K. Schwartz	1 1/8 m	1:49.66	$100,950
2002	Private Emblem	Jerry D. Bailey	Steven M. Asmussen	James Cassels & Bob Zollars	1 1/8 m	1:52.45	$108,770
2001	Personal Pro	Edgar Prado	H. James Bond	James F. Edwards	1 1/8 m	1:50.49	$119,200
2000	Gratiaen	Edgar Prado	Richard E. Schosberg	Gallagher's Stud	1 1/8 m	1:50.08	$106,020
1999	Gander	Pat Day	Charles Assimakopoulos	Gatsas Stables	1 1/8 m	1:48.98	$75,000
1998	Go Mikey Go	Richard Migliore	Gary C. Contessa	John Cholakis	1 1/8 m	1:50.60	$39,708
1997	Mr. Grousch	Jorge F. Chavez	H. James Bond	Rudlein Stable	1 1/8 m	1:49.80	$31,890
1996	Carr Tech	Jorge F. Chavez	Gary J. Sciacca	Sam F. Morrell	1 1/8 m	1:51.60	$33,240
1995	Ave's Flag	John R. Velazquez	Leo O'Brien	Jose F. Omland	1 1/8 m	1:52.10	$33,090
1994	Copper Mount	Julie Krone	Anthony R. Margotta Jr.	Saul Kupferberg	1 1/8 m	1:50.80	$33,330
1993	Prospector's Flag	Jerry D. Bailey	Nicholas P. Zito	Akindale Farm	1 1/8 m	1:48.73	$52,380
1992	Out Of The Realm	Chris Antley	Stephen W. Schaeffer	Vista View Stable	1 1/8 m	1:49.80	$71,400
1991	Excellent Tipper	Craig Perret	Howard M. Tesher	Earle I. Mack	1 1/8 m	1:50.19	$69,720
1990	Majesty's Time	Jorge F. Chavez	Gary J. Sciacca	Howard T. Whitbred	1 1/8 m	1:49.40	$51,120
1989	Audio Cassette	Jerry D. Bailey	Sarah A. Lundy	James F. Edwards	1 1/8 m	1:52.20	$53,730
1988	Fourstardave	Ángel Cordero Jr.	Leo O'Brien	Richard M. Bomze	1 1/8 m	1:50.40	$72,000
1987	Core A Apple	Julio A. Garcia	William M. Badgett Jr.	Harvey Friedman	1 1/8 m	1:51.40	$71,160
1986	Cheapskate	Marco Castenada	Darrel J. Vienna	Triple Dot Sash Stable	1 1/8 m	1:51.60	$69,360
1985	Poniard	Walter Guerra	Ramon M. Hernandez	Assunta Louis Farm	7 F	1:23.60	$41,460
1984	Flying Skipper	Don MacBeth	Chester Ross	Seymour Cohn	6 F	1:11.40	$43,480
1983	Jacque's Tip	Angel Santiago	Braulio Baeza	Entremont	7 F	1:24.20	$33,480
1982	Majestic Kat	Mary L. Russ	Roger Laurin	Lions Head Farm	7 F	1:23.20	$34,200
1981	Wimborne Castle	Ángel Cordero Jr.	Albert S. Barrera	Gedney Farm	7 F	1:24.60	$33,060
1980	Move It Now	Ruben Hernandez	James W. Maloney	Snowberry Farm	7 F	1:23.00	$32,520
1979	Dedicated Rullah	Ruben Hernandez	Ramon M. Hernandez	Assunta Louis Farm	7 F	1:23.00	$22,215
1978	Fio Rito	Jacinto Vásquez	Michael S. Ferraro	Raymond J. Lecesse	7 F	1:24.20	$22,530
