= Frank Lovato Jr. =

Jockey

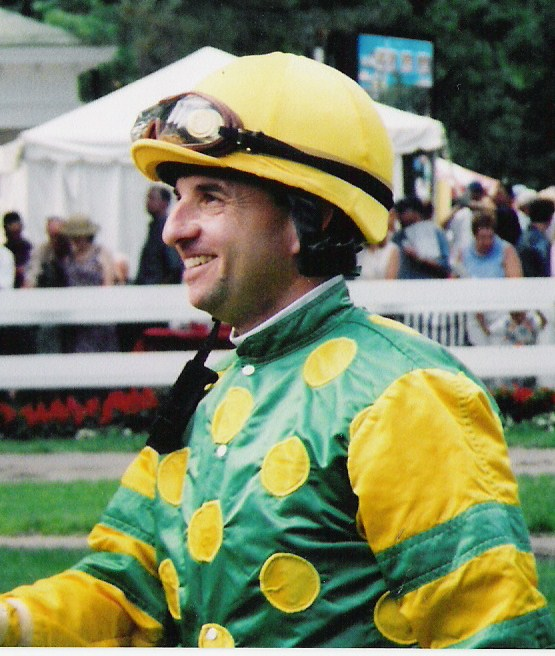
- Frankie Lovato, 2004

Personal information
- Born: January 30, 1963 (age 63) Cheverly, Maryland, U.S.
- Occupation: Jockey

Horse racing career
- Sport: Horse racing
- Career wins: 1,686

Major racing wins
- Kelso Handicap (1980, 1981); Display Handicap (1980, 1983); Massachusetts Handicap (1980); New York Derby (1980, 1986); New York Breeders' Futurity (1980, 1981, 1997); West Point (1980, 1987); West Virginia Derby (1981); Bed o' Roses (1981); Selima Stakes (1982); Yankee Handicap (1981); Natalma Stakes (1982); Miss Grillo Stakes (1982); Affectionately Handicap (1983,1994); First Flight Handicap (1983); King's Bishop Stakes (1983); Modesty Handicap (1983); Interborough Handicap (1984,1987); Bay Shore Stakes (1985); Sport Page Handicap (1986, 1993); Bourbonette Oaks (1986); Elkhorn Stakes (1986); Garden State Stakes (1987); Ashley T. Cole Handicap (1987); General Douglas MacArthur Handicap (1987); Martha Washington Breeders' Cup Stakes (1989); Cherry Hill Mile (1991); Boojum Handicap (1993); Toboggan Handicap (1995); Pan Zareta Stakes (1997, 2002); Azalea Breeders' Cup Stakes (1997); Great White Way Stakes (1997); Sleepy Hollow Stakes (1997); Queens County Handicap (1998); Deputed Testamony Stakes (1998); East View Stakes (1999); Bashford Manor Stakes (2001)

Racing awards
- Eclipse Award for Outstanding Apprentice Jockey (1980); Dogwood Dominion Award (Nominee - 2008, 2009)

Significant horses
- Slew o' Gold, Vanlandingham, Pancho Villa, Little Sister, Boom Towner, Peat Moss

Frank "Frankie" Lovato Jr. (born January 30, 1963, in Cheverly, Maryland) is a retired American Thoroughbred jockey, inventor, and educator of horse racing. His racing career spanned from 1979 until 2004. Including one additional race in 2012, Lovato rode a total of 15,604 mounts, with 1,686 wins and finishing in the money on another 3,506. This total included wins in 111 stakes races at 25 different tracks. The horses he rode earned a total of $41,795,367. In 1980 he won the Eclipse Award for Apprentice Jockey. He later went on to invent a horse riding simulator called the Equicizer and founded an educational and training program called Jockey World.

Lovato is very likely the only rider to ever win the same stakes race twice in one meet. He was still an apprentice on August 6, 1980, when he rode Quintessential in the $100,000 DeWitt Clinton Stakes for trainer Johnny Campo at Saratoga Race Course. As the last horse, Move It Now, was preparing to load in a field of 11, the starter accidentally pressed the start button opening the gates and starting the race. With the favorite Move It Now still behind the gates, and other jockeys, assistant starters and horses completely surprised and unprepared, Lovato managed to break cleanly, made the lead and won aboard Quintessential. The race was declared official though a re-run of the race was created two weeks later to make up for the false start mishap. On August 25, the new race was run but under a different name, the West Point Stakes, in which Lovato and Quintessential went on to win for the second time.

== Riding career ==
Frank Lovato Jr., was born Shawn Francis Lovato, the youngest son of four children. His father is the multiple stakes-winning East Coast jockey Frank Lovato Sr., who raced from 1957 until 1995. Lovato Jr. expressed determination to become a jockey from age four when he would join his father every chance he could during morning workouts and at the races. Inheriting the name "Little Frankie" despite repeated efforts to correct people to his real first name, he ultimately decided to use the name Frank Lovato Jr. once the time came to race professionally.

Lovato spent most of this childhood growing up and going to school in the suburb of Cherry Hill, New Jersey. At age 14 he left home to go work on a Thoroughbred farm in Ocala, Florida, where he worked as a farm hand and rider. At 16, he went to work for trainer Robert "Bobby" Murty, who put Lovato under contract and helped him get his first exercise riders' license in February 1979 at Hialeah Park Race Track.

After obtaining his GED high school diploma in early 1979, as a graduation present, Murty named Frankie on his first horse in May of that same year at Hialeah. Lovato then went to Belmont Park in New York, where he continued to be the head exercise rider for Murty Stable and rode a few more races over the course of the summer. He won his first race on October 9, 1979, aboard "Star T Lee" at the Meadowlands Racetrack in New Jersey for trainer Doug Peterson and Tayhill Stable.

Murty then sent Lovato to trainer Jerry Noss in Ohio and he went on to become the second leading rider of the meet and leading apprentice of the year at Thistledown. Over the course of his apprentice year, Lovato claimed leading apprentice titles not only in Ohio, but also in Louisiana, New York and New Jersey. Lovato was voted the Eclipse Award for Outstanding Apprentice Jockey in 1980.

At age 18, Lovato had mounts in the Preakness, Belmont and Travers Stakes. In the 1981 Jockey Club Gold Cup, he rode 50–1 longshot Peatmoss, almost beating the great John Henry and Bill Shoemaker, which could have been one of the biggest upsets of the decade. A week later, Frankie and Peatmoss teamed up again to win the Kelso Handicap for the second year in a row.

A few days later, Lovato was badly injured at the Meadowlands when his mount flipped over on top of him during the post parade. Frankie suffered a badly fractured femur requiring multiple surgeries and as a result, it cost him nearly 10 months of rehabilitation and recovery. It was during this time, Lovato developed a wooden horse to train on that later became the inspiration for the Equicizer.

Based mainly on the East Coast, Lovato rode at tracks all around the country throughout a career that spanned 25 years. He rode his last race on September 19, 2004, and thereafter retired from racing. In 2012, Lovato participated in a Legends Race at Arlington Park, during a week of racing events to benefit the Permanently Disabled Jockeys Fund (PDJF).

He and his wife Sandy, a certified Professional Association of Therapeutic Horsemanship (PATH International) instructor, also co-founded a therapeutic riding organization, Stampede of Dreams.

His wife Sandy, age 54, tragically died in a car accident September 3, 2014 https://www.drf.com/news/sandy-lovato-wife-eclipse-winning-jockey-dies

== Equicizer ==
Lovato built his first non-motorized mechanical horse in 1982 when he had to recover from a seriously broken leg that occurred as a result of a riding accident. There were no horse riding simulators on the market at the time, and so he designed one for his own rehabilitation. As word got out about his invention, Lovato began receiving requests from other jockeys to build more, and the design evolved into the Equicizer. Lovato originally manufactured Equicizers in his garage and could produce five a month, which were purchased by many top jockeys. In 2011 he sold the Equicizer brand to Equisense Inc., with the idea they would manufacture and marketed it more widely, but in March 2014 Lovato repurchased the business and took back full control.

Today, the Equicizer is used to train jockeys and rehabilitate riders in other disciplines. It is used by some therapeutic riding organizations for children and adults with disabilities. Equicizers were also used in the movie Seabiscuit for all of the closeup racing scenes and in other parts of the film.

== Jockey World ==
On top of making Equicizers full-time at his home in Norwalk, Ohio, Lovato also wanted to educate people about horse racing. In 2011 Lovato founded Jockey World, a 501(c)(3) non-profit dedicated to "providing reliable information, tools, training, guidance and resources that include knowledge in health & safety to anyone who wishes to pursue a career or develop a better understanding of the horse racing industry." Jockey World is not gambling-related, but is an educational organization. Lovato works to create "educational tools and media that are fun and engaging that will help people have a better understanding of the horse racing industry."

In 2009, Lovato held his first Jockey Camp to teach students about the physical and mental aspects of what it takes to become a jockey or exercise rider. Real horses are not used in this camp. Lovato conducts lessons with simulation training aboard Equicizers, video evaluations and analysis, indoor classroom, as well as outdoor activities. Lovato's goal with this camp is to "provide a comprehensive learning experience for prospective jockeys and exercise riders in a way that provides a safe and enlightening opportunity for those wishing to begin their journey as a jockey, exercise rider or another career in the Thoroughbred horse racing industry."

Jockey World Radio, co-hosted by Lovato and horsewoman Torrie Needham, is an educational internet radio broadcast about the world of thoroughbred horse racing with an inside look at racing's past, present and future and in the past, Lovato has invited many top industry leaders and professionals on-air to share their stories, knowledge and advice with his listeners. The program was on hiatus in 2013 so that Lovato could create the "365 Days of Racing Terminology" video series, which among other places, was presented on YouTube and America's Best Racing. Lovato's goal for this series was to create one racing terminology video for every day of 2013 to better educate racing fans and bring awareness to Jockey World's mission. With the help of an assistant, Lovato wrote and created a video for every day of the year, each one explaining and illustrating a term or phrase used in the racing industry. The videos were created using photos, video footage, and drawings along with Lovato's own narration or that of his guests to define each term.
