= Ruben Hernandez (jockey) =

Panamanian jockey

Personal information
- Born: November 21, 1950 (age 76) Panama City, Panama
- Occupation: Jockey

Horse racing career
- Sport: Horse racing
- Career wins: 3,636 (1,412, Panama & 2,224 United States)

Major racing wins
- Grade 1 stakes wins: Frizette Stakes (1977); Hollywood Derby (1977); Matron Stakes (1977); Selima Stakes (1977); Coaching Club American Oaks (1978); Maskette Stakes (1978, 1982); Champagne Stakes (1979); Hudson Stakes (NYB) (1979); Monmouth Invitational Handicap (1979); Alabama Stakes (1980); Beldame Stakes (1980); Belmont Futurity Stakes (1980); Hopeful Stakes (1980); Brooklyn Handicap (1981); Flamingo Stakes (1981); Marlboro Cup Handicap (1981); Top Flight Handicap (1981); American Derby (1982); Flower Bowl Invitational Handicap (1982); Vosburgh Stakes (1982) Other graded/stakes race wins: Palm Beach Handicap (1974, 1975) Jamaica Handicap (1976) Black Helen Handicap (1976) Fall Highweight Handicap (1976) Jerome Handicap (1976) Next Move Handicap (1976, 1978, 1979, 1981) Astarita Stakes (1977) Dwyer Stakes (1977, 1979) Long Island Handicap (1977) New York Handicap (1977, 1978) Affectionately Handicap (1978, 1980, 1981) Bay Shore Stakes (1978) Comely Stakes (1978) Demoiselle Stakes (1978, 1984) Shuvee Handicap (1978, 1981) Swift Stakes (1978, 1979) Test Stakes (1978, 1979) Albany Handicap (1979, 1980) Correction Handicap (1979) Damon Runyon Stakes (1979, 1980) Geisha Handicap (1979) John B. Campbell Handicap (1979) Juvenile Stakes (1979) New York Breeders' Futurity (1979) Paumonok Handicap (1979, 1981) Peter Pan Stakes (1979, 1981) Rare Perfume Handicap (1979) Westchester Handicap (1979) Athenia Handicap (1980) Gazelle Stakes (1980, 1981) Hollie Hughes Stakes (1980, 1984) Morven Stakes (1980) Sanford Stakes (1980) Sword Dancer Invitational Handicap (1980) Tidal Handicap (1980) Whitney Stakes (1980) Ballerina Stakes (1981) Molly Pitcher Handicap (1981) New York Derby (1981) Sheepshead Bay Handicap (1981) Yaddo Handicap (1981, 1982) Bernard Baruch Handicap (1982) Forego Handicap (1982) Hempstead Handicap (1982) Hill Prince Stakes (1982) Nashua Stakes (1982) Stuyvesant Handicap(1982) Tempted Stakes (1983) Cotillion Handicap (1984) Display Handicap (1984) Sam F. Davis Stakes (1985) San Vicente Stakes (1986) Miss Grillo Stakes (1987) Stymie Handicap (1987) Toboggan Handicap (1987) Salvator Mile Handicap (1989) Princess Rooney Handicap (1991, 1992) Virginia Handicap (1992) First Lady Handicap (1993) Palm Beach Stakes (1997); International wins: Clásico Internacional del Caribe (1978) U.S. Triple Crown wins: Belmont Stakes (1979)

Significant horses
- Coastal, Dance Spell, Lakeville Miss, Love Sign, Majesty's Prince, Noble Nashua, Pearl Necklace, Tap Shoes, Tiller
- Updated on June 30, 2021

Ruben Hernandez (born November 21, 1950) is a retired Panamanian thoroughbred racing jockey best known for winning the 1979 Belmont Stakes aboard Coastal in which he defeated that year's Kentucky Derby and Preakness Stakes winner Spectacular Bid thereby denying him the coveted U.S. Triple Crown.

== Racing career ==
=== The start ===
Ruben Hernandez began riding Thoroughbreds in his native Panama at the Hipódromo Presidente Remón in Panama City where he would win 1,412 races before emigrating to the United States. There, he would initially race at tracks in Florida, getting his first significant win at Hialeah Park in the April 3, 1974 Palm Beach Handicap, a race he would win again in 1975.

=== George Steinbrenner and a jockey's initiative ===
Overall, Ruben Hernandez enjoyed some success during his first four years racing in the United States. However, a game-changing win came in 1977 through a belief in himself that he could compete with the very best and he paid out of his own pocket the costs to travel from Florida to California with a purpose. There, he approached John Fulton, trainer for the Kinsman Stable owned by the notoriously hard-hearted owner of the New York Yankees baseball team, George Steinbrenner, and asked to ride their colt in the prestigious Grade 1 Santa Anita Derby to be run March 27. The admiration the action of Fernandez engendered from Steinbrenner was reported by The Washington Post, quoting him as saying "how many kids would do that, pay their own money to go from Florida to the Coast on a chance he could get work?" and adding, "I've got to stick with that kind of boy." Fernandez finished a very credible third on Steinbrenner's longshot colt Steve's Friend which paid bettors $16 to show.

On April 17, Ruben Hernandez and Steve's Friend gave Steinbrenner his biggest victory in racing when they won the Grade 1 Hollywood Derby. Sent off as a 34-1 longshot, Hernandez guided Steve's Friend to a 3/4 length come-from-behind victory over Affiliate and 3 1/2 lengths ahead of third-place finisher Habitony who had won the Santa Anita Derby. Steve's Friend won in a stakes record time of 1:47 4-5 for the 1-1/8 miles on dirt.

Returning East, Steve's Friend with Hernandez in the saddle again, ran fifth in the 1977 Kentucky Derby in what would be Seattle Slew's 1977 U.S. Triple Crown year.

The following year Ruben Hernandez rode from a base in New York state where he won numerous top level stakes. He ended 1978 with 172 wins from 992 starts for a 17% winning rate. He also traveled to Puerto Rico to ride and win with the Mexican horse Ezgarta in the Clásico Internacional del Caribe. A prestigious annual race for three-year-old horses hosted by one of the various Caribbean racetracks, the December 10, 1978, Clásico was run at Hippodromo El Nuevo Comandante.

== Winning the Belmont ==
In 1979, three-year-old Coastal did not run in the Kentucky Derby and Preakness Stakes having only made his first start in late April as a result of a serious eye injury which had cut short his racing at age two. Prior to entering the 1 1/2-mile Belmont Stakes, Coastal had raced only three times that year. He won all three under Ruben Hernandez but at short distances of six then seven furlongs followed by the Peter Pan Stakes at a 1-1/8 miles. At the 1 1/4-mile point in the Belmont, Spectacular Bid was leading the eight-horse field by three lengths over Kentucky Derby runner-up General Assembly who was followed by the Louisiana and Arkansas Derby winner and Preakness runner-up, Golden Act. Coastal was sitting in fourth place and made his move, passing those three horses to take the lead at the top of the stretch. At the end, Coastal won by 3-1/4 lengths over Golden Act with Spectacular Bid third.

For 1979, Hernandez would earn what would be a career-high 209 wins from 1,129 starts for a winning rate of 19%.

== A very capable rider ==
In a 1981 Washington Post story by Andrew Beyer about Noble Nashua winning the prestigious Marlboro Cup, the widely respected writer and developer of the Beyer Speed Figure wrote that winning jockey Ruben Hernandez had "made some of the best riders in America look like woeful incompetents."

During his career Hernandez won riding titles on racetracks in New York state and Florida.

Ruben Hernandez rode for the last time on November 22, 1997, at Calder Race Course in Miami Gardens, Florida.
