= Stuart Subotnick =

American businessman and media magnate (born 1942)

- Born: February 10, 1942 (age 84)
- Education: Baruch College (BBA); Brooklyn Law School (JD); New York University Law School (LLM)
- Occupations: businessman and media magnate
- Employer(s): Metromedia Company, Inc.
- Known for: In 1999, was the 398th-wealthiest person in the U.S.; was the longtime right-hand-man and chief financial officer of billionaire John Kluge, who at one time was the richest man in America.
- Title: Chief Executive Officer and President

Stuart Subotnick (born February 10, 1942) is an American businessman and media magnate. He is chief executive officer and president of Metromedia Company, Inc.

In 1999, he was the 398th-wealthiest person in the U.S., with a net worth of $650 million, and in 2002, was one of America's 500 wealthiest people. He was the longtime right-hand-man and chief financial officer of billionaire John Kluge, at one time the richest man in the US.

== Biography ==
Subotnick was born into a Jewish family, and grew up in a housing project in Williamsburg, Brooklyn. He has a brother and a sister. He earned a Bachelor of Business Administration degree in accounting from Baruch College in 1962, a JD degree from Brooklyn Law School in 1968, and an LLM degree from New York University Law School in 1974.

He is CEO and president of Metromedia Company, Inc., a privately held diversified Delaware general partnership owned by billionaire John Kluge. Subotnick was general partner and Executive Vice President of Metromedia starting in 1986. He has been President and Chief Executive Officer of the company since 2010.

He became a director of Carnival Corporation in 1987, and a director of Carnival plc in 2003. He is as Presiding Director at Carnival plc. He has been Senior Independent Director at Carnival PLC since April 2003. He is a Director of Carnival Cruise Lines Inc.

He was Vice Chairman of Orion Pictures from 1992 to July 1997. He co-founded Big City Radio Inc. in 1994. He has been Chairman of the company since that year.

He was a member of the board of directors of AboveNet, Inc. from July 1997 to July 2012. He is a Trustee of Central Park Conservancy.

From 1995 to 2001, he co-owned the New York/New Jersey MetroStars of Major League Soccer. In 2002, he owned a 330-acre thoroughbred racing farm – Anstu Stables, Inc. He is on the board of trustees for the Park East Synagogue in Manhattan. In 2022, Subotnick was inducted into the Wireless Hall of Fame for his position in the cellular community.
