= Finger Lakes Gaming and Race Track =

Thoroughbred race-track in New York State

Coordinates: 42.971183°N 77.343514°W

Finger Lakes Gaming & Racetrack
- Interactive map of Finger Lakes Gaming & Racetrack
- Location: Route 96 Farmington, New York, United States
- Owned by: Delaware North
- Date opened: May 23, 1962; 63 years ago
- Course type: Flat
- Notable races: New York Derby; Wadsworth Memorial Handicap; New York Breeders' Futurity

Finger Lakes Gaming & Racetrack is a thoroughbred horse-racing track and casino located in Farmington in western New York State, approximately 25 miles (40 km) southeast of Rochester. The facility is about one mile south of New York State Thruway exit 44.

== History ==
Finger Lakes Racetrack opened on May 23, 1962, as a thoroughbred horse race track. The race track has gone through several ownership changes and a cycle of successful and near-bankrupt seasons. Famous jockeys that have ridden at Finger Lakes include Angel Cordero, Pat Day, Julie Krone, and Bill Shoemaker. Ross Morton, a well-known race caller, was Finger Lakes' announcer from opening day until his death in February 2008. And Tin Cup Chalice, the first winner of the Big Apple Triple Crown of Racing, made his home at Finger Lakes. Unfortunately, Tin Cup Chalice died on April 17, 2009, in a freak accident while training at the track. A colt named Zany bolted and collided with him and both horses died.

As a seasonal business, holding races from spring to fall, the track was financially hurt with the advent of Off Track Betting in the 1980s. Finger Lakes rebounded in the 1990s when simulcast racing began. Under this system, patrons were able to attend the clubhouse year-round and wager on races at other tracks around the country. In 2004, Finger Lakes Race Track became Finger Lakes Gaming and Race Track after a $10.5 million renovation. The largest part of the renovation was the addition of a racino, which is a casino-style video gaming floor. Attendance rose at the facility after the introduction of the racino.

== Feature Races ==
Finger Lakes is home to the New York Derby, a 1 1/16 mile restricted race for 3 year old horses who have been bred in the state of New York. Carrying a purse of $150,000, the race is a part of the Big Apple Triple, consisting of the Mike Lee Stakes at Belmont Park, the New York Derby, and the Albany Stakes at Saratoga Race Course. The New York Derby race is typically run in July.

Finger Lakes Race Track does not offer any graded stakes. They do offer ungraded and restricted stakes throughout the meet.

=== List of stakes races at Finger Lakes ===
- Arctic Queen Handicap
- Aspirant Stakes
- Finger Lakes Juvenile
- Finger Lakes Juvenile Fillies
- Genesee Valley Breeders Handicap
- George W. Barker Handicap
- Jack Betta Be Rite Handicap
- Lady Fingers Stakes
- Leon Reed Memorial Handicap
- New York Breeders' Futurity
- New York Derby
- New York Oaks
- Niagara Stakes
- Ontario County Stakes
- Proud Puppy Handicap
- Susan B. Anthony Handicap
- Wadsworth Memorial Handicap
