= Farmington, New York =

Farmington
- Town
- Location within the state of New York
- Coordinates: 42°58′51″N 77°19′19″W
- Country: United States
- State: New York
- County: Ontario

Government
  - Type: Town Council
  - Town Supervisor: Peter Ingalsbe (R)
  - Town Council: Members' List: • Nathan Bowerman (R); • Matthew Guilfoil (D); • Ronald Herendeen (R); • Aubrae Lamparella (I)

Area
  - Total: 39.43 sq mi (102.12 km^{2})
  - Land: 39.43 sq mi (102.12 km^{2})
  - Water: 0 sq mi (0.00 km^{2})
- Elevation: 577 ft (176 m)

Population (2020)
  - Total: 14,275 ▲
  - Estimate (2021): 12,528
  - Density: 328.3/sq mi (126.76/km^{2})
- Time zone: UTC−5 (Eastern (EST))
  - Summer (DST): UTC−4 (EDT)
- ZIP Codes: 14425 and 14564
- Area codes: 585 and 315/680
- FIPS code: 36-25406
- GNIS feature ID: 0978953

Farmington is a town located in the northern part of Ontario County, New York, United States. The population was 14,275 at the 2020 census.

== History ==
Farmington was part of the Phelps and Gorham Purchase. The town was formed along with its county in 1789, and settlement of the region began the same year. Many of the early settlers were Quakers from Berkshire County, Massachusetts. In 1824, Arthur Power left Farmington with two of his sons and other Quakers to found Farmington, Michigan.

The Farmington Quaker Crossroads Historic District was listed on the National Register of Historic Places in 2007.

== Geography ==
The land, at an average elevation of 600 feet above sea level, is compressed by the Wisconsin glaciation and slopes from an elevation of 700 feet at the southern border with the town of Canandaigua, to 500 feet at the north boundary with the town of Macedon. The land comprises drumlins and eskers. Other than streams and ponds, there are no major water landmarks. Public drinking water is provided by treated water piped from Canandaigua Lake.

According to the United States Census Bureau, the town has a total area of 39.5 square miles (102 km^{2}), all land.

The New York State Thruway (Interstate 90) passes across the town. New York State Route 332 is a north–south highway, and New York State Route 96 is an east–west highway.

The northern town line is shared by the town of Macedon in Wayne County.

== Demographics ==
Historical population
Census	Pop.	Note	%±
1820	4,214		—
1830	1,773		−57.9%
1840	2,122		19.7%
1850	1,876		−11.6%
1860	1,858		−1.0%
1870	1,896		2.0%
1880	1,978		4.3%
1890	1,703		−13.9%
1900	1,607		−5.6%
1910	1,568		−2.4%
1920	1,465		−6.6%
1930	1,477		0.8%
1940	1,453		−1.6%
1950	1,399		−3.7%
1960	2,114		51.1%
1970	3,565		68.6%
1980	8,933		150.6%
1990	10,381		16.2%
2000	10,585		2.0%
2010	11,825		11.7%
2020	14,275		20.7%
2021 (est.)	14,528		1.8%
U.S. Decennial Census

As of the census Farmington is approximately 25 miles southeast of Rochester. The town was named after Farmington, Connecticut. of 2000, there were 10,585 people, 3,870 households, and 2,894 families residing in the town. The population density was 268.3 inhabitants per square mile (103.6/km^{2}). There were 4,046 housing units at an average density of 102.6 per square mile (39.6/km^{2}). The racial makeup of the town was 96.53% White, 1.02% African American, 0.26% Native American, 0.94% Asian, 0.01% Pacific Islander, 0.26% from other races, and 0.97% from two or more races. Hispanic or Latino of any race were 1.21% of the population.

There were 3,870 households, out of which 40.4% had children under the age of 18 living with them, 60.2% were married couples living together, 10.7% had a female householder with no husband present, and 25.2% were non-families. 18.6% of all households were made up of individuals, and 4.7% had someone living alone who was 65 years of age or older. The average household size was 2.73 and the average family size was 3.14.

In the town, the population was spread out, with 28.7% under the age of 18, 7.6% from 18 to 24, 32.0% from 25 to 44, 25.0% from 45 to 64, and 6.6% who were 65 years of age or older. The median age was 35 years. For every 100 females, there were 95.8 males. For every 100 females age 18 and over, there were 93.4 males.

The median income for a household in the town was $49,863, and the median income for a family was $54,769. Males had a median income of $39,645 versus $26,097 for females. The per capita income for the town was $20,756. About 3.7% of families and 5.6% of the population were below the poverty line, including 6.8% of those under age 18 and 5.0% of those age 65 or over.

== Notable people ==
- Elbridge G. Lapham, former US Senator
- Harold F. Loomis, biologist

== Communities and other locations in the town ==
- Auburn Meadows – A community in the southwest part of the town.
- Blacksmith Corners – A location in the southeast part of the town on NY-96.
- Brownsville – A hamlet near the west town line in the northern part of the town.
- Farmbrook – A location in central Farmington.
- Farmington – A hamlet south of the Thruway on County Road 8.
- The Grove—A neighborhood that encompasses the Farmington Grove Park.
- Hathaway Corners – A hamlet in the southwest part of the town at the junction of NY-332 and County Road 41.
- Ingleside Corner – A location by the west town line on NY-332.
- Mertensia (Previously called "West Farmington") – A hamlet in the southwest part of the town on County Road 41.
- New Salem – An historic location near the north town line.
- Pumpkin Hook – A community in the northwestern part of the town near Allen-Padgham Rd and Hook Rd.
- Saratoga Crossing – A community near the west townline, just south of State Route 332.
- Doe Haven – A community in the southwest part of the town.

== Business ==
- Finger Lakes Gaming and Race Track – The only privately owned Thoroughbred horse-racing track in New York state.
- Ultrafab – Manufacturer of weatherstripping and related products
- Unisource – Supply company

== Public safety ==
Fire protection is provided by the Farmington Volunteer Fire Assoc., which has two fire stations within the town: Station #1, located in "Pumpkin Hook" in the north section and Station #2, located at State Route 96 and Hook Rd near the business district.

The Ontario County Sheriff's department provides law enforcement in the town as well as the New York State Police. The New York State Police Troop E headquarters is located in Farmington and serves a 10-county region.

Victor-Farmington Volunteer Ambulance provides EMS service to the town.
