= Barry K. Schwartz =

American businessman

- Born: May 25, 1942 (age 83); New York City, U.S.
- Occupations: Businessman; Racehorse owner
- Known for: Co-founder & chairman, Calvin Klein Inc.
- Board member of: New York Racing Association; Philatelic Foundation
- Spouse: Sheryl Schwartz
- Children: 2
- Awards: Alfred G. Vanderbilt Award (2001)

Barry K. Schwartz (born May 25, 1942) is an American businessman, co-founder of Calvin Klein Inc., thoroughbred racehorse owner, and a former horse racing industry executive.

== Biography ==
Schwartz's father, a grocer, was murdered when Barry was twenty-one years old. Schwartz grew up in a one-bedroom apartment in The Bronx. He is Jewish. In 1968 he borrowed $10,000 to partner with childhood friend and fashion designer Calvin Klein to establish the clothing manufacturer, Calvin Klein Inc.

== Thoroughbred racing ==
A member of The Jockey Club, Barry Schwartz has been an active owner in Thoroughbred horse racing since 1978 and has raced a number of horses. In 2001, the New York Turf Writers' Association voted him that year's Alfred G. Vanderbilt Award as The Person Who Did the Most For Racing. He served as Chairman of the New York Racing Association from 2000 to 2004. Since 1979 he has owned Stonewall Farm, a 750-acre (3.0 km^{2}) horse farm in Granite Springs, a hamlet in the Town of Somers, New York. One source says it is “roughly 740 acres” and is one of the largest privately owned properties in Westchester, second in size in to the Rockefellers. The estate was put on the market in March 2020 with an asking price of $100 million. In 1979, for $3.25 million, they “bought the largest swath of Stonewall, a 673-acre parcel.”

Among Schwartz's hobbies, he is a stamp collector and is a member of the Board of Trustees of the Philatelic Foundation in New York City.

== Personal life ==
Besides Stonewall Farm, Schwartz and his wife, Sheryl, own a home in Santa Barbara, California. The couple met in 1967 on a blind date at Roosevelt Raceway. They have two children.
