= Breeders' Cup Juvenile Fillies Turf top three finishers =

This is a listing of the horses that finished in either first, second, or third place and the number of starters in the Breeders' Cup Juvenile Fillies Turf, a grade two race run on grass on Friday of the Breeders' Cup World Thoroughbred Championships.

Year	Winner	Second	Third	Starters
2026	Sun Goddess (IRE)	Green Empress (IRE)	Curracloe	14
2025	Balantina (IRE)	Pacific Mission	Ground Support	12
2024	Lake Victoria (IRE)	May Day Ready	Nitrogen	14
2023	Hard To Justify	Porta Fortuna	She Feels Pretty	14
2022	Meditate (IRE)	Pleasant Passage	Cario Consort	14
2021	Pizza Bianca	Malavath	Haughty	14
2020	Aunt Pearl (IRE)	Mother Earth	Miss Amulet	14
2019	Sharing	Daahyeh	Sweet Melania	14
2018	Newspaperofrecord	East	Stellar Agent	14
2017	Rushing Fall	Best Performance	September (IRE)	14
2016	New Money Honey	Coasted	Cavale Doree	14
2015	Catch A Glimpse	Alice Springs	Nemoralia	14
2014	Lady Eli	Sunset Glow	Oasila	13
2013	Chriselliam (IRE)	Testa Rosi	Colonel Joan	14
2012	Flotilla (FR)	Watsdachances	Summer of Fun	13
2011	Stephanie's Kitten	Stopshoppingmaria	Sweet Cat	14
2010	More Than Real	Winter Memories	Kathmanblu	14
2009	Tapitsfly	Rose Catherine	House of Grace	12
2008	Maram	Heart Shaped	Laragh	12

== See also ==
- Breeders' Cup World Thoroughbred Championships
