= Sands Point Stakes =

- Class: Grade III
- Location: Belmont Park; Elmont, New York, United States
- Inaugurated: 1995
- Race type: Thoroughbred – Flat racing
- Website: NYRA

Race information
- Distance: 1 1/8 miles
- Surface: Turf
- Track: Left-handed
- Qualification: Three-year-old fillies
- Weight: 124 lbs. with allowances
- Purse: US$200,000 (2021)

The Sands Point Stakes is a Grade III American Thoroughbred horse race for three-year-old fillies over a distance of 1 1/8 miles on the turf track scheduled annually in October at Belmont Park in Elmont, New York. The event currently offers a purse of $200,000.

== History ==
The event is named after Sands Point, New York, a village located at the northernmost tip of the Cow Neck Peninsula on the North Shore of Long Island.

The event was inaugurated on 23 June 1995 as the Sands Point Handicap and was run over the 1 1/16 mile distance with Perfect Arc ridden by US Hall of Fame jockey John R. Velazquez winning the event by five lengths over the odds-on favorite Miss Union Avenue in a time of 1:43.14. Perfect Arc in 1995 was crowned New York State Horse of the Year.

In 1997 the distance of the event was increased to 1 1/8 mile.

In 1998 the conditions of the event were changed from a handicap to stakes allowance race. That same year the event was classified as Grade III.

In 2001 and 2003 the event was downgraded to a Listed event when it was raced on the main track due to inclement weather.

In 2008 the event was upgraded to Grade II.

In 2020 the distance of the event was decreased to one mile and the following year the distance was reverted to 1 1/8 miles.

In 2026 the Thoroughbred Owners and Breeders Association downgraded the event to Grade III.

== Records ==
Speed record:

- 1 1/8 miles: 1:46.65 – Auntie Mame (1997)
- 1 1/16 miles: 1:42.50 – Discreet Marq (2013)

Margins:

- 6 lengths – Tweedside (2001)

Most wins by an owner:

- 2 – Darley Stable (2008, 2012)
- 2 – Head Of Plains Partners (2017, 2021)
- 2 – Godolphin (2015, 2023)

Most wins by a trainer:

- 6 – Chad C. Brown (2014, 2017, 2019, 2020, 2021, 2024)

Most wins by a jockey:

- 3 – Joel Rosario (2015, 2019, 2021)
- 3 – John R. Velazquez (1995, 2005, 2022)

== Winners ==
Year	Winner	Jockey	Trainer	Owner	Distance	Time	Purse	Grade	Ref
At Belmont - Sands Point Stakes
2026	Americathegreat	Javier Castellano	Mark E. Casse	Gary Barber and D J Stable	1 1/8 miles	1:48.18	$200,000	III	
At Aqueduct
2025	Ready for Candy	Ricardo Santana Jr.	Phillip Antonacci	Lindy Farms	1 1/8 miles	1:49.44	$200,000	II	
2024	Spaliday	Manuel Franco	Chad C. Brown	Peter M. Brant	1 1/8 miles	1:47.47	$200,000	II	
2023	Eternal Hope (IRE)	Jamie Spencer	Charlie Appleby	Godolphin	1 1/8 miles	1:53.56	$200,000	II	
2022	Skims (GB)	John R. Velazquez	Claude R. McGaughey III	Andrew Rosen	1 1/8 miles	1:51.14	$200,000	II	
At Belmont Park
2021	Fluffy Socks	Joel Rosario	Chad C. Brown	Head of Plains Partners	1 1/8 miles	1:48.48	$200,000	II	
2020	Tamahere (FR)	Irad Ortiz Jr.	Chad C. Brown	Swift Thoroughbreds, Madaket Stables & Wonder Stables	1 mile	1:35.21	$150,000	II	
2019	New and Improved	Joel Rosario	Chad C. Brown	Klaravich Stables	1 1/8 miles	1:48.44	$203,200	II	
2018	Californiagoldrush	Flavien Prat	Neil D. Drysdale	Alice Bamford	1 1/8 miles	1:54.06	$400,000	II	
2017	Uni (GB)	Irad Ortiz Jr.	Chad C. Brown	Michael Dubb, Head Of Plains Partners, Robert LaPenta & Bethlehem Stable	1 1/8 miles	1:48.97	$400,000	II	
2016	On Leave	Jose L. Ortiz	Claude R. McGaughey III	Stuart Janney III	1 1/8 miles	1:47.82	$500,000	II	
2015	Sentiero Italia	Joel Rosario	Kiaran P. McLaughlin	Godolphin	1 1/8 miles	1:48.83	$500,000	II	
2014	Ball Dancing	Joe Bravo	Chad C. Brown	William S. Farish III & Steve F. Mooney	1 1/8 miles	1:50.18	$500,000	II	
2013	Discreet Marq	Jose Lezcano	Christophe Clement	Patricia A. Generazio	1 1/16 miles	1:42.50	$200,000	II	
2012	Better Lucky	Eddie Castro	Thomas Albertrani	Darley Stable	1 1/16 miles	1:42.75	$200,000	II	
2011	Winter Memories	Jose Lezcano	James J. Toner	Phillips Racing Partnership	1 1/16 miles	1:42.61	$150,000	II	
2010	Check the Label	Ramon A. Dominguez	H. Graham Motion	Brereton C. Jones	1 1/8 miles	1:47.16	$150,000	II	
2009	Gozzip Girl	Kent J. Desormeaux	Thomas Albertrani	Farnsworth Stables	1 1/8 miles	1:51.24	$150,000	II	
2008	Raw Silk	Alan Garcia	Thomas Albertrani	Darley Stable	1 1/8 miles	1:48.46	$150,000	II	
2007	Bit of Whimsy	Edgar S. Prado	Barclay Tagg	Virginia Kraft Payson	1 1/8 miles	1:48.53	$109,000	III	Dead heat
2007	Rutherienne	Garrett K. Gomez	Christophe Clement	Joyce Young	1 1/8 miles	1:48.53	$109,000	III	Dead heat
2006	Wait A While	Garrett K. Gomez	Todd A. Pletcher	Arindel Farm	1 1/8 miles	1:49.25	$104,200	III	Off turf
2005	Melhor Ainda	John R. Velazquez	Robert J. Frankel	T N T Stud	1 1/8 miles	1:47.50	$111,200	III	
2004	Mambo Slew	Edgar S. Prado	Patrick L. Biancone	Frank Manganaro	1 1/8 miles	1:47.24	$114,800	III	
2003	Savedbythelight	Richard Migliore	Richard A. Violette Jr.	Earle I. Mack	1 1/8 miles	1:49.18	$114,600	Listed	Off turf
2002	Riskaverse	Robbie Davis	Patrick J. Kelly	Fox Ridge Farm Inc.	1 1/8 miles	1:51.63	$116,100	III	
2001	Tweedside	Richard Migliore	Todd A. Pletcher	Eugene & Laura Melnyk	1 1/8 miles	1:50.43	$107,800	Listed	Off turf
2000	Gaviola	Jerry D. Bailey	William H. Turner Jr.	Twilite Farms	1 1/8 miles	1:47.77	$111,300	III	
1999	Perfect Sting	Pat Day	Joe Orseno	Stronach Stable	1 1/8 miles	1:46.99	$108,600	III	
1998	Recording	Jorge F. Chavez	Jonathan E. Sheppard	Augustin Stable	1 1/8 miles	1:48.93	$116,000	III	
Sands Point Handicap
1997	Auntie Mame	Jerry D. Bailey	Angel A. Penna Jr.	Lazy F Ranch	1 1/8 miles	1:46.65	$111,200	Listed	
1996	Merit Wings	Robbie Davis	Thomas J. Skiffington	James W. Phillips	1 1/16 miles	1:45.83	$87,613	Listed	
1995	Perfect Arc	John R. Velazquez	Angel A. Penna Jr.	Brazil Stables	1 1/16 miles	1:43.14	$82,326	Listed	

Legend:
Dirt Turf

== See also ==
List of American and Canadian Graded races
