= Miss Grillo Stakes =

- Class: Grade II
- Location: Belmont Park; Elmont, New York, United States
- Inaugurated: 1980 (at Aqueduct Racetrack)
- Race type: Thoroughbred – Flat racing
- Website: NYRA

Race information
- Distance: 1 1/16 miles
- Surface: Turf
- Track: Left-handed
- Qualification: Two-year-old fillies
- Weight: 122 lbs with allowances
- Purse: US$200,000 (2021)

The Miss Grillo Stakes is a Grade II American Thoroughbred horse race for two-year-olds filles over a distance of 1 1/16 miles on the turf track scheduled annually in late September at Belmont Park in Elmont, New York. The event currently offers a purse of $200,000.

== History ==
The event was named for the Argentine bred filly Miss Grillo, a record breaking stakes winner in the 1940s who won the Diana Handicap twice.

The event was inaugurated on 29 October 1980 at Aqueduct Racetrack and was run over the 1 1/8 mile distance with Robert Kluener's Smilin' Sera winning the event by one length over De La Rose in a time of 1:51 2/5. De La Rose the following year would be crowned the US Champion Female Turf Horse.

In 1982 the event was classified as Grade III, upgraded to Grade II in 1988 and was downgraded to Grade III the following year. From 2001–2007 the race was not graded as in 2009 when the event was moved off the turf track due to the inclement weather and held over a shorter one mile distance. In 2018 the event was upgraded back to Grade II.

The event was run in two divisions in 1988.

The distance of the event has been changed several times but since 2010 the event has been run over the current distance of 1 1/16 miles.

The race was part of the Breeders' Cup Challenge series from 2008 to 2010, with the winner automatically qualifying for the Breeders' Cup Juvenile Fillies Turf.

In 2022 the event was moved to Aqueduct Racetrack due to infield tunnel and redevelopment work at Belmont Park.

== Records ==
Speed record:

- 1 1/16 miles: 1:40.49 – Namaste's Wish (2007)
- 1 1/8 miles: 1:49.53 – Belle Cherie (1998)

Margins:

- 8 lengths – Melhor Ainda (2004)

Most wins by an owner:

- 3 – Klaravich Stables (2018, 2019, 2026)

Most wins by a jockey:

- 3 – Jose Lezcano (2008, 2010, 2013)
- 3 – Javier Castellano (2012, 2016, 2019)

Most wins by a trainer:

- 10 – Chad C. Brown (2008, 2012, 2013, 2014, 2016, 2017, 2018, 2019, 2023, 2026)

== Winners ==
Year	Winner	Jockey	Trainer	Owner	Distance	Time	Purse	Grade	Ref
At Belmont - Miss Grillo Stakes
2026	Domestic Agenda	Flavien Prat	Chad C. Brown	Klaravich Stables	1 1/16 miles	1:41.34	$250,000	II	
At Aqueduct
2025	Ground Support	Adam Beschizza	Kelsey Danner	NBS Stable	1 1/16 miles	1:43.32	$200,000	II	
2024	Scythian	Junior Alvarado	William I. Mott	Lawrence Goichman	1 1/16 miles	1:42.68	$200,000	II	
2023	Hard to Justify	Flavien Prat	Chad C. Brown	Wise Racing	1 1/16 miles	1:43.92	$200,000	II	
2022	Pleasant Passage	Irad Ortiz Jr.	Claude R. McGaughey	Emory Hamilton	1 1/16 miles	1:45.25	$200,000	II	
At Belmont Park
2021	Sail By	Junior Alvarado	Leah Gyarmati	Treadway Racing Stable	1 1/16 miles	1:43.21	$200,000	II	
2020	Plum Ali	Jose L. Ortiz	Christophe Clement	Michael Dubb, Madaket Stables, Bethlehem Stable	1 1/16 miles	1:42.03	$145,500	II	
2019	Selflessly	Javier Castellano	Chad C. Brown	Klaravich Stables	1 1/16 miles	1:42.11	$200,000	II	
2018	Newspaperofrecord (IRE)	Irad Ortiz Jr.	Chad C. Brown	Klaravich Stables	1 1/16 miles	1:42.29	$200,000	II	
2017	Significant Form	Irad Ortiz Jr.	Chad C. Brown	Stephanie Seymour Brant	1 1/16 miles	1:44.58	$200,000	III	
2016	New Money Honey	Javier Castellano	Chad C. Brown	e Five Racing Thoroughbreds	1 1/16 miles	1:41.41	$200,000	III	
2015	Tin Type Gal	Luis Saez	H. Graham Motion	My Meadowview Farm	1 1/16 miles	1:43.50	$200,000	III	
2014	Lady Eli	Irad Ortiz Jr.	Chad C. Brown	Sheep Pond Partners	1 1/16 miles	1:43.50	$200,000	III	
2013	Testa Rossi (FR)	Jose Lezcano	Chad C. Brown	James Covello, Thomas Coleman & DMZ Racing Stable	1 1/16 miles	1:41.73	$200,000	III	
2012	Watsdachances (IRE)	Javier Castellano	Chad C. Brown	Michael E. Kisber & Bradley Thoroughbreds	1 1/16 miles	1:47.90	$150,000	III	
2011	Pure Gossip	Ryan Curatolo	Philip M. Serpe	Flying Zee Stable	1 1/16 miles	1:47.71	$100,000	III	
2010	Winter Memories	Jose Lezcano	James J. Toner	Phillips Racing Partnership	1 1/16 miles	1:45.69	$150,000	III	
2009	Dad's Crazy	Julien R. Leparoux	Todd A. Pletcher	Smarch Racing	1 mile	1:40.04	$141,000	Listed	Off turf
2008	Maram	Jose Lezcano	Chad C. Brown	Karen N. Woods	1 1/16 miles	1:46.12	$164,200	III	
2007	§ Namaste's Wish	Kent J. Desormeaux	William I. Mott	Live Oak Plantation	1 1/16 miles	1:40.49	$81,900	Listed	
2006	Chestoria	Eibar Coa	Bruce N. Levine	E L R Corp	1 1/8 miles	1:50.82	$84,375	Listed	
2005	Wait A While	Jerry D. Bailey	Todd A. Pletcher	Arindel Farm	1 1/8 miles	1:52.87	$82,550	Listed	Off turf
2004	Melhor Ainda	Jose A. Santos	Robert J. Frankel	Stud TNT	1 1/8 miles	1:51.28	$82,200	Listed	
2003	Please Take Me Out	Aaron Gryder	Alfredo Callejas	Robert Perez	1 1/8 miles	1:50.75	$84,400	Listed	
At Aqueduct
2002	Fircroft	Jean-Luc Samyn	George R. Arnold II	G. Watts Humphrey Jr.	1 1/8 miles	1:49.79	$84,000	Listed	Off turf
2001	Riskaverse	Robbie Davis	Patrick J. Kelly	Fox Ridge Farm	1 1/8 miles	1:51.61	$86,700	Listed	
At Belmont Park
2000	Ruff	John R. Velazquez	David G. Donk	Robert Spiegel	1 1/8 miles	1:49.79	$111,300	III	
1999	Wolf Alert	Jerry D. Bailey	Gary C. Contessa	Nedlaw Stable & William F. Coyro Jr.	1 1/8 miles	1:54.01	$111,000	III	
1998	Belle Cherie	John R. Velazquez	Philip G. Johnson	Jeffrey Foong & Roy Jackson	1 1/8 miles	1:49.53	$112,500	III	
At Aqueduct
1997	Compassionate	Robbie Davis	Mark A. Hennig	Ethel D. Jacobs	1 1/8 miles	1:53.13	$114,500	III	
At Belmont Park
1996	Miss Huff n' Puff	Richard Migliore	Richard A. Violette Jr.	Ralph M. Evans	1 1/16 miles	1:41.47	$113,400	III	Off turf
At Aqueduct
1995	Mountain Affair	Todd Kabel	Kathy Patton	Harry T. Mangurian Jr.	1 1/16 miles	1:53.91	$115,600	III	
At Belmont Park
1994	Upper Noosh	Eddie Maple	Patrick J. Kelly	Fox Ridge Farm	1 1/16 miles	1:47.10	$81,626	III	
1993	Chelsey Flower	Jorge Velasquez	Jose A. Martin	Clanni Gael Stable	1 1/16 miles	1:45.21	$124,200	III	
1992	Missymooiloveyou	Herb McCauley	Thomas M. Walsh	Dan-dev Stable	1 1/16 miles	1:42.57	$100,000	III	
1991	Good Mood	Mike E. Smith	Richard A. DeStasio	Peter E. Blum	1 1/16 miles	1:42.60	$131,200	III	
At Aqueduct
1990	† Purana	Herb McCauley	Philip A. Gleaves	Strauss Medina Farm	1 1/8 miles	1:51.40	$93,300	III	
1989	Savina	Jerry F. Belmonte	Woodford C. Stephens	Henryk de Kwiatkowski	1 1/8 miles	1:56.20	$132,200	III	
1988	Memories	Jean Cruguet	John M. Veitch	Darby Dan Farm	1 1/8 miles	1:58.80	$136,700	II	Division 1
1988	Darby's Daughter	Calvin H. Borel	Clarence E. Picou	James E. Cottrell	1 1/8 miles	1:59.20	$123,000	II	Division 2
1987	Betty Lobelia	Ruben Hernandez	H. Allen Jerkens	Bohemia Stable	1 1/8 miles	1:55.00	$94,050	III	
1986	Lovelier	Angel Cordero Jr.	D. Wayne Lukas	Harbor View Farm	1 1/8 miles	1:52.20	$91,650	III	Off turf
1985	Cadabra Abra	Jorge Velasquez	Daniel Perlsweig	Jerry R. Pinkley	1 1/8 miles	1:55.40	$87,750	III	
1984	Endear	Gregg McCarron	Woodford C. Stephens	Claiborne Farm	1 1/8 miles	1:55.00	$86,550	III	
1983	Heartlight	Angel Cordero Jr.	Howard M. Tesher	Rhonda Allen	1 1/8 miles	2:04.80	$56,500	III	
1982	§ Bemissed	Frank Lovato Jr.	Woodford C. Stephens	Ryehill Farm (Jim & Eleanor Ryan)	1 1/8 miles	1:51.80	$84,150	III	
1981	Baby Duck	Gregg McCarron	Braulio Baeza	Regal Oak Farm	1 1/8 miles	1:51.40	$84,450		
1980	Smilin' Sera	Jean-Luc Samyn	Philip G. Johnson	Robert Kluener	1 1/8 miles	1:51.40	$55,000		

Legend:
Dirt Turf
Notes:
§ Ran as an entry
† In the 1990 running, Seewillo was first past the post but was disqualified for interference in the straight and Purana was declared the winner.

== See also ==
List of American and Canadian Graded races
