= Lake George Stakes =

- Class: Grade III
- Location: Saratoga Race Course; Saratoga Springs, New York, United States
- Inaugurated: 1996
- Race type: Thoroughbred - Flat racing
- Website: NYRA

Race information
- Distance: 1 1/16 miles
- Surface: Turf
- Track: Left-handed
- Qualification: Three-year-old fillies
- Weight: 124 lbs with allowances
- Purse: $175,000 (2022)

The Lake George Stakes is a Grade III American Thoroughbred horse race for three-year-old fillies over a distance of one and one-sixteenth miles on the turf course scheduled annually in August at Saratoga Race Course in Saratoga Springs, New York. The event currently carries a purse of $175,000.

== History ==
The event was inaugurated on 2 August 1996 with the event being split into two divisions. Both winners of the split divisions were ridden by United States' Racing Hall of Fame jockey Jerry D. Bailey. The first division was won by Memories of Silver and the second division was won by Dynasty.

The event is named for the large lake Lake George, which is located about 26 miles north of Saratoga Springs, New York.

The event was run in two divisions three times, inaugural running in 1996, 1998 and the last time in 2001. For the 1998 running the event was classified as Grade III.

On November 28, 2007, this Grade III stakes race was upgraded to a Grade II by the American Graded Stakes Committee.

Due to unseasonal rain, the event in 2009 was moved off the turf and run on a sloppy dirt track with only four runners and was reclassified as a Grade III after examination by the Graded Stakes Committee.

The 2010 winner Perfect Shirl continued her bright career and in 2011 the mare won the Breeders' Cup Filly & Mare Turf. The 2011 winner Winter Memories, who recorded the longest winning margin in the event, was runner-up in the 2010 Breeders' Cup Juvenile Fillies Turf.

In 2025 the distance of the event was increased to 1 1/16 miles.

== Records ==
Speed record:

- 1 mile: 1:35.64 - Dolce Zel (FR) (2022)
- 1 1/16 miles: 1:40.11 - Nani Rose (1999)

Margins:

- 4 1/2 lengths - Winter Memories (2011)

Most wins by a jockey:

- 5 - Jerry D. Bailey (1996 (2), 1997, 2001, 2004)

Most wins by a trainer:

- 7 - Chad C. Brown (2015, 2016, 2019, 2020, 2021, 2022, 2023)

Most wins by an owner:

- 3 - Klaravich Stables (2020, 2021, 2023)

== Winners ==
Year	Winner	Jockey	Trainer	Owner	Distance	Time	Purse	Grade	Ref
2026	Amberglen (IRE)	Irad Ortiz Jr.	Brad H. Cox	Stonestreet Stables	1 1/16 miles	1:42.33	$225,000	III	
2025	Daisy Flyer	Jose Lezcano	George R. Arnold II	Calumet Farm	1 1/16 miles	1:40.19	$175,000	III	
2024	Pounce	Dylan Davis	Mark E. Casse	Resolute Racing	1 mile	1:35.84	$175,000	III	
2023	Surge Capacity	Joel Rosario	Chad C. Brown	Klaravich Stables	1 mile	1:38.00	$175,000	III	
2022	Dolce Zel (FR)	Irad Ortiz Jr.	Chad C. Brown	Madaket Stables, Michael Dubb, & Robert V. LaPenta	1 mile	1:35.64	$175,000	III	
2021	Technical Analysis	Jose Ortiz	Chad C. Brown	Klaravich Stables	1 mile	1:36.61	$150,000	III	
2020	Selflessly	David Cohen	Chad C. Brown	Klaravich Stables	1 mile	1:36.06	$100,000	III	
2019	Regal Glory	Luis Saez	Chad C. Brown	Paul P. Pompa Jr.	1 mile	1:36.23	$130,500	III	
2018	Daddy Is a Legend	Manuel Franco	George Weaver	Jim & Susan Hill	1 1/16 miles	1:40.42	$150,000	III	
2017	Proctor's Ledge	Javier Castellano	Brendan P. Walsh	Patricia L. Moseley	1 1/16 miles	1:41.47	$150,000	III	
2016	Ancient Secret	Irad Ortiz Jr.	Chad C. Brown	Alpha Delta Stables	1 1/16 miles	1:40.35	$200,000	II	
2015	Mrs McDougal	Irad Ortiz Jr.	Chad C. Brown	Mr. & Mrs. William K. Warren Jr.	1 1/16 miles	1:41.52	$200,000	II	
2014	Daring Dancer	Alan Garcia	H. Graham Motion	Sagamore Farm	1 1/16 miles	1:40.92	$200,000	II	
2013	Kitten's Dumplings	Joel Rosario	Michael J. Maker	Kenneth & Sarah Ramsey	1 1/16 miles	1:42.21	$200,000	II	
2012	Centre Court	Julien R. Leparoux	George R. Arnold II	G. Watts Humphrey Jr.	1 1/16 miles	1:41.71	$200,000	II	
2011	Winter Memories	Jose Lezcano	James J. Toner	Phillips Racing Partnership	1 1/16 miles	1:41.57	$150,000	II	
2010	Perfect Shirl	John R. Velazquez	Roger L. Attfield	Charles Fipke	1 1/16 miles	1:41.28	$150,000	II	
2009	Be Fair	Rajiv Maragh	D. Wayne Lukas	Westrock Stables	1 1/8 miles	1:50.61	$142,500	III	Off turf
2008	My Princess Jess	Eibar Coa	Barclay Tagg	Lael Stables	1 1/16 miles	1:44.00	$150,000	II	
2007	Rutherienne	Garrett K. Gomez	Christophe Clement	Virginia Kraft Payson	1 1/16 miles	1:40.34	$115,100	III	
2006	Magnificent Song	Garrett K. Gomez	Todd A. Pletcher	L and D Farm	1 1/16 miles	1:45.88	$112,900	III	
2005	Ready's Gal	John R. Velazquez	Todd A. Pletcher	James T. Scatuorchio	1 1/16 miles	1:41.90	$111,000	III	
2004	Seducer's Song	Jerry D. Bailey	Christophe Clement	Peter F. Karches	1 1/16 miles	1:42.01	$113,900	III	
2003	Film Maker	Edgar S. Prado	H. Graham Motion	Donald A. Adam	1 1/16 miles	1:41.80	$114,500	III	
2002	Nunatall (GB)	Jorge F. Chavez	Robert J. Frankel	Edmund A. Gann	1 1/16 miles	1:40.71	$115,000	III	
2001	Light Dancer	Mark Guidry	Manuel Criollo	Harvey J. Loewenstein, Barbara Criollo & Bluestar Stable	1 1/16 miles	1:41.06	$111,750	III	Division 1
2001	Voodoo Dancer	Jerry D. Bailey	Christophe Clement	Green Hills Farm	1 1/16 miles	1:41.45	$112,250	III	Division 2
2000	Millie's Quest	John R. Velazquez	Robert J. Frankel	3 Plus U Stable	1 1/16 miles	1:44.52	$116,800	III	
1999	Nani Rose	Shane Sellers	Patrick B. Byrne	Stonerside Stable	1 1/16 miles	1:40.11	$112,800	III	
1998	Tenski	Richard Migliore	Linda L. Rice	Richard L. Golden	1 1/16 miles	1:40.86	$83,450	III	Division 1
1998	Caveat Competor	John R. Velazquez	H. Graham Motion	Eugene F. Ford	1 1/16 miles	1:40.86	$84,600	III	Division 2
1997	Auntie Mame	Jerry D. Bailey	Angel A. Penna Jr.	Lazy F Ranch (Corbett)	1 1/16 miles	1:42.80	$85,200	Listed	
1996	Memories of Silver	Jerry D. Bailey	James J. Toner	James W. Phillips	1 1/16 miles	1:42.98	$56,300	Listed	Division 1
1996	Dynasty	Jerry D. Bailey	Gary Sciacca	Lee Pokoik	1 1/16 miles	1:42.26	$56,050	Listed	Division 2

Legend:
Dirt Turf

== See also ==
- List of American and Canadian Graded races
