= Beaugay Stakes =

- Class: Grade III
- Location: Belmont Park; Elmont, New York, United States
- Inaugurated: 1978
- Race type: Thoroughbred – Flat racing
- Website: NYRA

Race information
- Distance: 1 1/16 miles (8.5 furlongs)
- Surface: Turf
- Track: Left-handed
- Qualification: Fillies & Mares, three-year-olds & older
- Weight: 124 lbs. with allowances
- Purse: US$175,000 (2023)

The Beaugay Stakes is a Grade III American Thoroughbred horse race for fillies and mares three-years-old and older over a distance of one and one-sixteenth of a mile at Belmont Park in Elmont, Long Island, New York.

== History ==
The event was inaugurated on 30 December 1978 at Aqueduct Racetrack and run on the dirt track.

The race is named in honor of Elizabeth Arden's Beaugay, the American Champion Two-Year-old of 1945.

In 1979, the Beaugay Handicap was raced in two divisions.

In 1983 NYRA moved the race to Belmont Park and was run on the turf course in early June.

Due to bad weather in 1998 that severely affected the turf course, the race was run on the dirt track at a distance of one mile.

In 2024 the event was moved to Aqueduct Racetrack due to infield tunnel and redevelopment work at Belmont Park.

== Records ==
Speed record: (at 1 1/16 Miles on turf)

- 1:39.22 – Strike Charmer (2016)

Margins:

- 6 lengths – Key To The Bridge (1988)

Most wins:

- 2 – Summer Secretary (1989, 1991)

Most wins by an owner:

- 2 – Bohemia Stable (1984, 1987)
- 2 – Edward P. Evans (1985, 1996)
- 2 – Fox Ridge Farm (1988, 1992)
- 2 – Peter M. Brant (2019, 2022)
- 2 – Madaket Stables, Michael Dubb (2018, 2026)

Most wins by a jockey:

- 5 – Jerry D. Bailey (1994, 1996, 2000, 2001, 2002)
- 5 - Irad Ortiz Jr. (2016, 2018, 2019, 2023, 2025)

Most wins by a trainer:

- 8 – Chad C. Brown (2014, 2018, 2019, 2020, 2022, 2023, 2025, 2026)

== Winners ==
| Year | Winner | Age | Jockey | Trainer | Owner | Distance | Time | Purse | Grade | Ref |
|---|---|---|---|---|---|---|---|---|---|---|
At Aqueduct - Beaugay Stakes
| 2026 | City Girl (FR) | 4 | Flavien Prat | Chad C. Brown | Madaket Stables, Michael Dubb & Michael E. Kisber | 1 1/16 miles | 1:42.61 | $169,750 | III | |
| 2025 | Dynamic Pricing (IRE) | 4 | Irad Ortiz Jr. | Chad C. Brown | Klaravich Stables | 1 1/16 miles | 1:42.12 | $175,000 | III | |
| 2024 | Neecie Marie | 4 | Joel Rosario | Robert Reid Jr. | Michael Milam | 1 1/16 miles | 1:42.80 | $169,750 | III | |
At Belmont Park
| 2023 | Marketsegmentation | 4 | Irad Ortiz Jr. | Chad C. Brown | Klaravich Stables | 1 1/16 miles | 1:41.25 | $175,000 | III | |
| 2022 | Rougir (FR) | 4 | Flavien Prat | Chad C. Brown | Michael Tabor & Peter M. Brant | 1 1/16 miles | 1:45.27 | $150,000 | III | |
| 2021 | Harvey's Lil Goil | 4 | Junior Alvarado | William I. Mott | Estate of Harvey A. Clarke & Paul Braverman | 1 1/16 miles | 1:43.44 | $150,000 | III | |
| 2020 | Rushing Fall | 4 | Javier Castellano | Chad C. Brown | e Five Racing Thoroughbreds | 1 1/16 miles | 1:40.71 | $97,000 | III | |
| 2019 | Homerique | 4 | Irad Ortiz Jr. | Chad C. Brown | Peter M. Brant | 1 1/16 miles | 1:44.76 | $200,000 | III | |
| 2018 | A Raving Beauty (GER) | 5 | Irad Ortiz Jr. | Chad C. Brown | Michael Dubb, Madaket Stables & Bethlehem Stables | 1 1/16 miles | 1:41.64 | $200,000 | III | |
| 2017 | Hawksmoor (IRE) | 4 | Julien R. Leparoux | Arnaud Delacour | Lael Stables | 1 1/16 miles | 1:48.91 | $150,000 | III | |
| 2016 | Strike Charmer | 6 | Irad Ortiz Jr. | Mark A. Hennig | Courtlandt Farms | 1 1/16 miles | 1:39.22 | $150,000 | III | |
| 2015 | Discreet Marq | 5 | John R. Velazquez | Christophe Clement | Moyglare Stud Farm | 1 1/16 miles | 1:42.15 | $150,000 | III | |
| 2014 | Waterway Run | 4 | Jose Lezcano | Chad C. Brown | Martin S. Schwartz | 1 1/16 miles | 1:42.75 | $150,000 | III | |
| 2013 | Hessonite | 5 | Junior Alvarado | David G. Donk | William J. Punk Jr. & Philip DiLeo | 1 1/16 miles | 1:40.82 | $150,000 | III | |
| 2012 | Winter Memories | 4 | Eddie Castro | James J. Toner | Phillips Racing Partnership | 1 1/16 miles | 1:43.87 | $150,000 | III | |
| 2011 | Daveron (GER) | 6 | Eddie Castro | H. Graham Motion | Team Valor International | 1 1/16 miles | 1:42.99 | $98,000 | III | |
| 2010 | Dynaslew | 4 | Eibar Coa | Seth Benzel | Live Oak Plantation Racing | 1 1/16 miles | 1:42.39 | $100,000 | III | |
| 2009 | My Princess Jess | 4 | Cornelio Velásquez | Barclay Tagg | Lael Stables | 1 1/16 miles | 1:44.83 | $109,000 | III | |
At Aqueduct – Beaugay Handicap
| 2008 | Criminologist | 5 | John R. Velazquez | Claude R. McGaughey III | Stuart S. Janney III | 1 1/16 miles | 1:41.44 | $106,200 | III | |
| 2007 | Masseuse | 5 | Edgar S. Prado | James J. Toner | Patricia, Ronald & Justin Nicholson & Henry Elser | 1 1/16 miles | 1:47.43 | $113,600 | III | |
| 2006 | Pommes Frites | 4 | Cornelio Velásquez | William I. Mott | Haras Santa Maria de Araras | 1 1/16 miles | 1:43.15 | $112,300 | III | |
| 2005 | Finery | 5 | Pablo Fragoso | William H. Turner Jr. | Althea D. Richards | 1 1/16 miles | 1:44.40 | $112,800 | III | |
| 2004 | Dedication (FR) | 5 | Javier Castellano | Christophe Clement | Ghislaine Head | 1 1/16 miles | 1:46.20 | $110,000 | III | |
| 2003 | Delta Princess | 4 | Michael J. Luzzi | William I. Mott | Saud bin Khaled | 1 1/16 miles | 1:42.20 | $112,400 | III | |
| 2002 | Voodoo Dancer | 4 | Jerry D. Bailey | Christophe Clement | Green Hills Farm | 1 1/16 miles | 1:43.00 | $113,200 | III | |
| 2001 | Gaviola | 4 | Jerry D. Bailey | William H. Turner Jr. | Twilite Farm | 1 1/16 miles | 1:41.60 | $109,900 | III | |
| 2000 | Perfect Sting | 4 | Jerry D. Bailey | Joe Orseno | Stronach Stable | 1 1/16 miles | 1:42.20 | $109,700 | III | |
| 1999 | Tampico | 6 | John R. Velazquez | Barclay Tagg | Ronald G. Cullis | 1 1/16 miles | 1:44.20 | $111,700 | III | |
| 1998 | National Treasure | 5 | Richard Migliore | Mitchell E. Friedman | Sunny Meadow Farm | 1 mile | 1:37.80 | $112,900 | III | |
| 1997 | Careless Heiress | 4 | Joe Bravo | Jimmy Croll | Robert Levy | 1 1/16 miles | 1:46.20 | $109,600 | III | |
| 1996 | Christmas Gift | 4 | Jerry D. Bailey | Mark A. Hennig | Edward P. Evans | 1 1/16 miles | 1:42.80 | $84,675 | III | |
| 1995 | Caress | 4 | Robbie Davis | H. Allen Jerkens | Harbor View Farm | 1 1/16 miles | 1:42.00 | $83,175 | III | |
| 1994 | Cox Orange | 4 | Jerry D. Bailey | Christophe Clement | Mohammed Al Maktoum | 1 1/16 miles | 1:43.20 | $82,326 | III | |
| 1993 | McKaymackenna | 4 | Jorge Velásquez | Rene A. Araya | R Kay Stable | 1 1/16 miles | 1:44.80 | $95,400 | III | |
At Belmont Park
| 1992 | Christiecat | 5 | Jean-Luc Samyn | Patrick J. Kelly | Fox Ridge Farm | 1 1/16 miles | 1:46.80 | $94,200 | III | |
| 1991 | Summer Secretary | 6 | Jorge Velásquez | H. Allen Jerkens | Middletown Stables | 1 1/16 miles | 1:40.16 | $90,450 | III | |
| 1990 | Fieldy (IRE) | 7 | Craig Perret | Thomas J. Skiffington | Fernwood Stables | 1 1/16 miles | 1:45.80 | $87,900 | III | |
| 1989 | Summer Secretary | 4 | Jean-Luc Samyn | Thomas J. Skiffington | Evergreen Farms | 1 1/16 miles | 1:43.40 | $94,800 | III | |
| 1988 | Key To The Bridge | 4 | Eddie Maple | Patrick J. Kelly | Fox Ridge Farm | 1 1/16 miles | 1:51.80 | $86,100 | III | |
| 1987 | †Give A Toast | 4 | Robbie Davis | H. Allen Jerkens | Bohemia Stable | 1 1/16 miles | 1:44.20 | $92,400 | III | |
| 1986 | Duty Dance | 4 | Jean Cruguet | Claude R. McGaughey III | Ogden Mills Phipps | 1 1/16 miles | 1:40.20 | $93,000 | III | |
| 1985 | †Possible Mate | 4 | Jacinto Vásquez | Philip G. Johnson | Edward P. Evans | 1 1/16 miles | 1:40.60 | $71,000 | Listed | |
| 1984 | †Thirty Flags | 4 | Ángel Cordero Jr. | H. Allen Jerkens | Bohemia Stable | 1 1/16 miles | 1:42.00 | $76,400 | Listed | |
| 1983 | Trevita (IRE) | 6 | Jorge Velásquez | Jonathan E. Sheppard | Augustin Stable | 1 1/16 miles | 1:47.80 | $61,700 | | |
At Aqueduct
| 1982 | Cheap Seats | 3 | Ángel Cordero Jr. | John Parisella | Theodore Sabarese | 1 1/16 miles | 1:45.20 | $56,300 | | |
| 1981 | Andover Way | 3 | Ángel Cordero Jr. | Howard M. Tesher | H. Joseph Allen | 1 1/16 miles | 1:44.00 | $57,400 | | |
| 1980 | Samarta Dancer | 4 | Larry Saumell | Flint S. Schulhofer | Stephen Peskoff | 1 1/16 miles | 1:43.60 | $55,900 | | |
| 1979 | Plankton | 3 | Ruben Hernandez | Howard M. Tesher | Frederick K. Tesher | 1 1/16 miles | 1:46.00 | $42,687 | | Division 1 |
| 1979 | Heavenly Ade | 3 | Mickey Solomone | Mary L. Edens | Adele W. Paxson | 1 1/16 miles | 1:45.60 | $42,688 | | Division 2 |
| 1978 | Shukey | 3 | Jorge Velásquez | Willard C. Freeman | Anne Minor Stone | 1 1/16 miles | 1:45.20 | $42,925 | | |

Legend:
Turf Dirt
Notes:
† Ran as part of an entry

== See also ==
List of American and Canadian Graded races
