= Pegasus Stakes =

- Class: Listed
- Location: Monmouth Park Racetrack; Oceanport, New Jersey, United States
- Inaugurated: 1980
- Race type: Thoroughbred – Flat racing
- Website: www.monmouthpark.com

Race information
- Distance: One and one-sixteenth miles (8.5 furlongs)
- Surface: Dirt
- Track: left-handed
- Qualification: Three-year-olds
- Weight: Assigned
- Purse: $150,000 (2021)

The Pegasus Stakes is a Listed American Thoroughbred horse race run annually in June at Monmouth Park Racetrack in Oceanport, New Jersey. An event for three-year-olds of either gender, it is contested at a mile and a sixteenth (eight and a half furlongs) on the dirt, and currently offers a purse of $150,000.

Inaugurated as a minor event on November 11, 1980 at Meadowlands Racetrack in East Rutherford, New Jersey, the following year it became the Pegasus Handicap and would be run as such thru 2002. There was no race in 2003 and it returned in 2004 as the Pegasus Stakes. The race was hosted by Meadowlands 1980–2006 and 2008–2009. Its 1996 edition was raced on the turf course.

A former Grade 1 race, the 1997 Pegasus offered a purse of $1,000,000.

== Historical race notes ==
In 1999, Forty One Carats, ridden by jockey Jorge Chavez, won the Pegasus Handicap by a nose over Unbridled Jet. The winner's time of 1:45 2/5 broke the Meadowlands track record for a mile and one-eighth on dirt.

Sally Bailie became the first woman trainer in the history of American Thoroughbred racing to win a $200,000 race when she captured the 1982 edition of the Pegasus Handicap with Fast Gold.

== Records ==
Speed record:

- 1:45.40 @ 1 1/8 miles: Forty One Carats (1999) (NTR)
- 1:40.80 @ 1 1/16 miles Flying Chevron (1995)

Most wins by a jockey:

- 5 – Joe Bravo (1998, 2016, 2018, 2019, 2020)

Most wins by a trainer:

- 6 – Todd Pletcher (2005, 2008, 2013, 2016, 2019, 2024)

Most wins by an owner:

- 2 - Gary and Mary West (2022, 2023)
- 2 – William H. Perry (1991, 1992)

== Winners ==
Year	Winner	Age	Jockey	Trainer	Owner	Dist. (Miles)	Time	Purse $	Gr.
2025	Bracket Buster	3	Axel Concepcion	Victoria H. Oliver	BBN Racing	1 1/16 mi	1:44.64	$150,000	L/R
2024	Tuscan Sky	3	Javier Castellano	Todd Pletcher	Spendthrift Farm LLC	1 1/16 mi	1:43.31	$150,000	L/R
2023	Salute the Stars	3	Joel Rosario	Brad H. Cox	Gary and Mary West	1 1/16 mi	1:43.87	$150,000	L/R
2022	Home Brew	3	Paco Lopez	Brad H. Cox	Gary and Mary West	1 1/16 mi	1:43.20	$150,000	L/R
2021	Mandaloun	3	Florent Geroux	Brad H. Cox	Juddmonte Farms	1 1/16 mi	1:44.63	$150,000	L/R
2020	Pneumatic	3	Joe Bravo	Steve Asmussen	Winchell Thoroughbreds LLC	1 1/16 mi	1:44.76	$155,000	L/R
2019	King For A Day	3	Joe Bravo	Todd Pletcher	Red Oak Stable (John J. Brunetti Sr.)	1 1/16 mi	1:42.59	$150,000	L/R
2018	Supreme Aura	3	Joe Bravo	Michael Stidham	Stallionaire Enterprises LLC (Rick Kanter)	1 1/16 mi	1:46.84	$102,000	L/R
2017	Timeline	3	Javier Castellano	Chad Brown	Woodford Racing LLC (William S. Farish IV, mn.ptr.)	1 1/16 mi	1:41.32	$100,000	G3
2016	Donegal Moon	3	Joe Bravo	Todd Pletcher	Donegal Racing (Jerry Crawford, mn.ptr.)	1 1/16 mi	1:44.15	$150,000	G3
2015	Mr. Jordan	3	Paco Lopez	Edward Plesa Jr.	David Melin, Leon Ellman, Laurie Plesa	1 1/16 mi	1:42.71	$150,000	G3
2014	Albano	3	Kerwin D. Clark	J. Larry Jones	Brereton C. Jones	1 1/16 mi	1:44.17	$150,000	G3
2013	Verrazano	3	John Velazquez	Todd Pletcher	Let's Go Stable (Michael Tabor, Susan Magnier, Derrick Smith)	1 1/16 mi	1:41.72	$150,000	G3
2012	Le Bernardin	3	Mike Luzzi	Kiaran McLaughlin	Darley Stable	1 1/16 mi	1:44.51	$100,000	G3
2011	Pants On Fire	3	Rosie Napravnik	Kelly Breen	George & Lori Hall	1 1/16 mi	1:42.89	$200,000	G3
2010	Afleet Express	3	Javier Castellano	Jimmy Jerkens	Gainesway Farm, Martin L. Cherry	1 1/16 mi	1:45.44	$200,000	G3
2009	Bad Action	3	David Cohen	Gary Contessa	Winning Move Stable (Steve Sigler, mn.ptr.), Sanford H. Robbins LLC, P. & D. Kaplan Racing LLC	1 1/8 mi	1:49.16	$150,000	G3
2008	Atoned	3	Chris DeCarlo	Todd Pletcher	Dogwood Stable	1 1/8 mi	1:49.40	$200,000	G3
2007	Actin Good	3	Cornelio Velásquez	Robert Dibona	Leo-Sag Stables, Gus Goldsmith, Greg and Jerrich Stable	1 1/8 mi	1:51.54	$250,000	G3
2006	Diamond Stripes	3	Edgar Prado	Rick Dutrow	Four Roses Thoroughbreds (Kassem Masri)	1 1/8 mi	1:47.30	$250,000	G3
2005	Magna Graduate	3	John Velazquez	Todd Pletcher	Elizabeth H. Alexander	1 1/8 mi	1:47.40	$250,000	G3
2004	Pies Prospect	3	Edgar Prado	Nick Zito	Robert V. LaPenta	1 1/8 mi	1:48.40	$300,000	G3
2003	Race not held								
2002	Regal Sanction	3	José A. Santos	James A. Jerkens	Susan & John Moore	1 1/8 mi	1:49.80	$350,000	G2
2001	Volponi	3	Shaun Bridgmohan	Philip G. Johnson	Amherst Stable (Kathy Johnson), Spruce Pond Stable (Edward Baier)	1 1/8 mi	1:46.80	$250,000	G2
2000	Kiss A Native	3	Mickey Walls	David R. Bell	John A. Franks	1 1/8 mi	1:48.20	$250,000	G2
1999	Forty One Carats	3	Jorge Chavez	David Fawkes	Jack T. Hammer & Walter L. New	1 1/8 mi	1:45.40	$400,000	G2
1998	Tomorrows Cat	3	Joe Bravo	Mark A. Hennig	Donald S. & Roberta Mary Zuckerman & Camelia J. Casby	1 1/8 mi	1:46.80	$500,000	G2
1997	Behrens	3	Jerry Bailey	H. James Bond	William Clifton Jr.	1 1/8 mi	1:46.60	$1,000,000	G2
1996	Allied Forces	3	Richard Migliore	Kiaran McLaughlin	Ahmed Al Tayer	1 1/16 mi	1:47.00	$200,000	G2
1995	Flying Chevron	3	Robbie Davis	James J. Toner	Kimran Stable (Ronald Nicholson)	1 1/16 mi	1:40.80	$200,000	G2
1994	Brass Scale	3	Edgar Prado	Charles Peoples	Bayard Sharp	1 1/8 mi	1:49.20	$200,000	G2
1993	Diazo	3	Laffit Pincay Jr.	Bill Shoemaker	Allen E. Paulson	1 1/8 mi	1:47.00	$250,000	G1
1992	Scuffleburg	3	Julie Krone	Scotty Schulhofer	William H. Perry	1 1/8 mi	1:49.00	$500,000	G1
1991	Scan	3	José A. Santos	Scotty Schulhofer	William H. Perry	1 1/8 mi	1:46.40	$300,000	G1
1990	Silver Ending	3	Ed Delahoussaye	Ron McAnally	Angelo Costanza & Ron McAnally	1 1/8 mi	1:47.20	$300,000	G1
1989	Norquestor	3	Julie Krone	Hubert Hine	Scott C. Savin	1 1/8 mi	1:49.60	$300,000	G1
1988	Brian's Time	3	Ángel Cordero Jr.	John M. Veitch	Joan W. Phillips	1 1/8 mi	1:47.00	$300,000	G1
1987	Cryptoclearance	3	José A. Santos	Scotty Schulhofer	Philip Teinowitz	1 1/8 mi	1:48.60	$300,000	G1
1986	Danzig Connection	3	Pat Day	Woody Stephens	Henryk de Kwiatkowski	1 1/8 mi	1:49.00	$300,000	G2
1985	Skip Trial	3	Jean-Luc Samyn	Hubert Hine	Zelda Cohen	1 1/8 mi	1:51.00	$300,000	G2
1984	Hail Bold King	3	Jorge Velásquez	William E. Burch	Cornelius Vanderbilt Whitney	1 1/8 mi	1:49.20	$200,000	G2
1983	World Appeal	3	Antonio Graell	Scotty Schulhofer	Elton D. Kohr Sr.	1 1/8 mi	1:46.60	$200,000	G2
1982	Fast Gold	3	Jean-Luc Samyn	Sally A. Bailie	Aisco Stable	1 1/8 mi	1:49.00	$200,000	
1981	Summing	3	George Martens	Luis S. Barrera	Charles T. Wilson Jr.	1 1/8 mi	1:51.00	$200,000	
1980	Dr. Blum	3	Ruben Hernandez	Howard M. Tesher	H. Joseph Allen	6 f	1:11.00	$25,000	
