= Winter Memories =

American-bred Thoroughbred racehorse

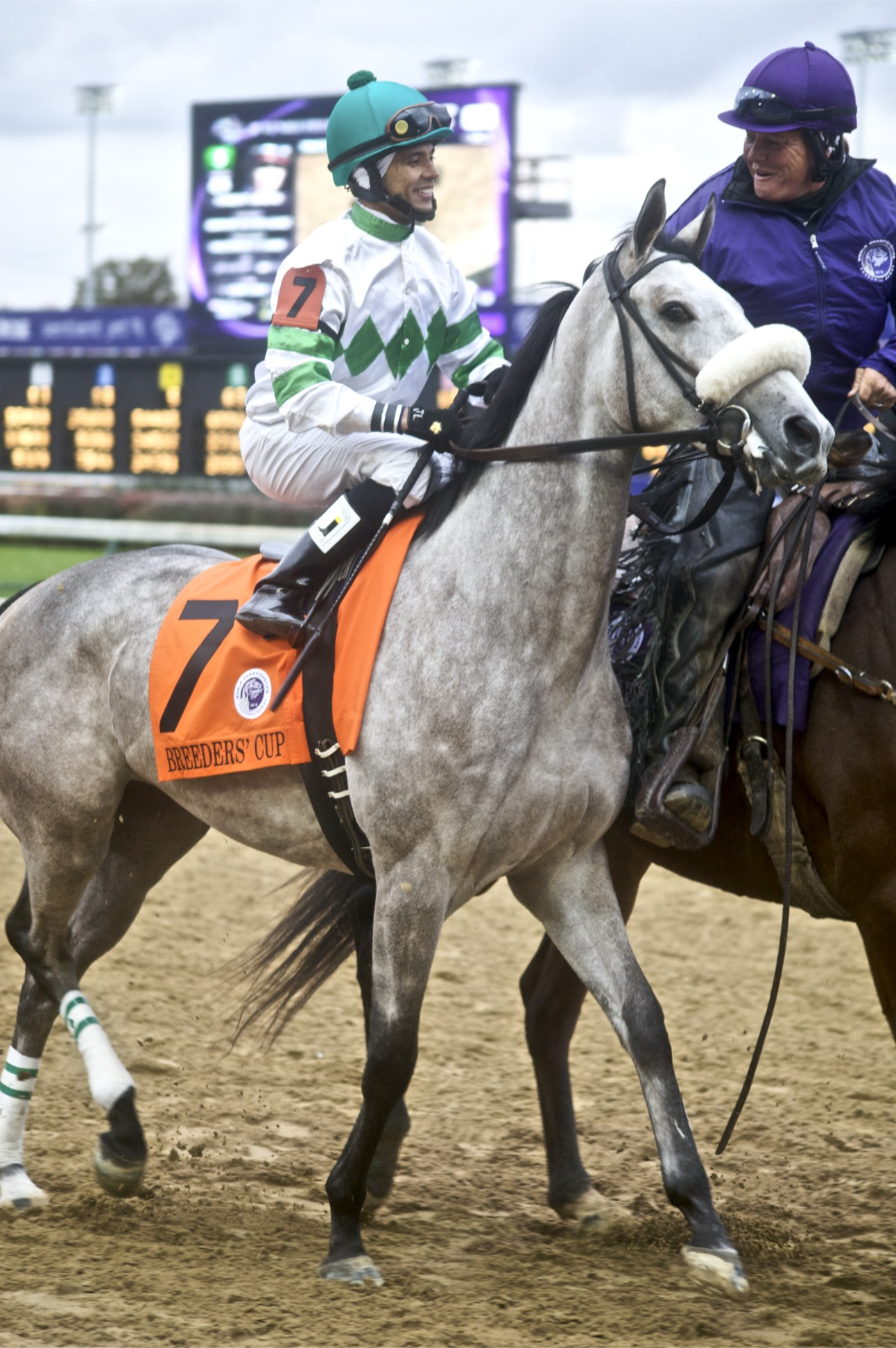
- Winter Memories (2010 Breeders' Cup Juvenile Fillies)
- Sire: El Prado
- Dam: Memories Of Silver
- Damsire: Silver Hawk
- Sex: Filly
- Foaled: April 24, 2008
- Died: May 16, 2023
- Country: United States
- Colour: Gray or Roan
- Breeder: Phillips Racing Partnership
- Owner: Phillips Racing Partnership
- Trainer: James J. Toner
- Record: 12: 8-1-0
- Earnings: US$ 1,268,100

Major wins
- Miss Grillo Stakes (2010); Appalachian Stakes (2011); Sands Point Stakes (2011); Lake George Stakes (2011); Garden City Handicap (2011); Beaugay Stakes (2012); Diana Handicap (2012)

Honours
- Grade III Winter Memories Stakes at Aqueduct Racetrack (2016– )
- Last updated on July 24, 2025

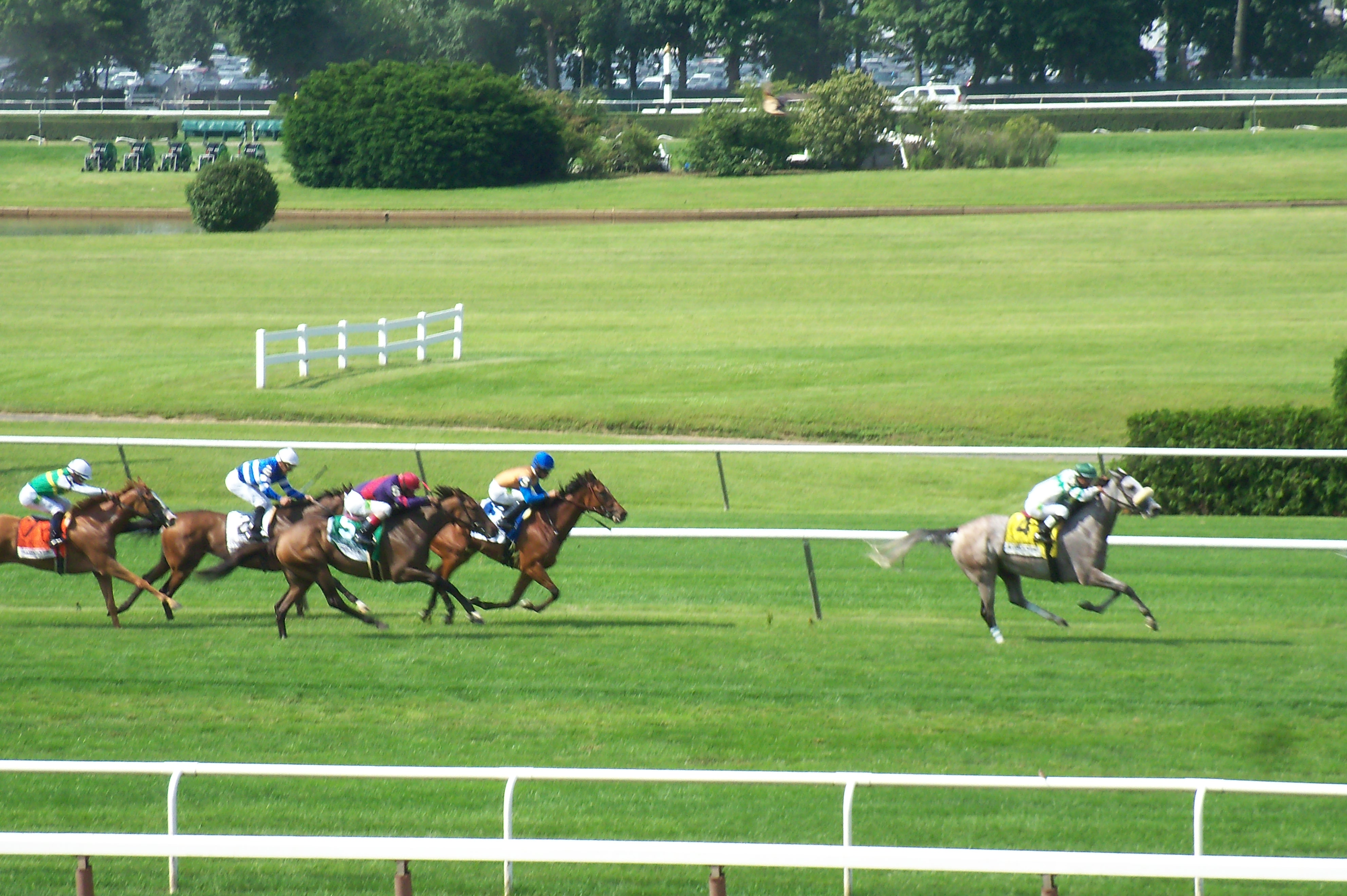
Winter Memories racing in the 2012 Just A Game Stakes at Belmont Park.

Winter Memories (April 24, 2008 – May 16, 2023) was an American Thoroughbred racehorse. As a two-year-old, she won the Miss Grillo Stakes and finished second in the Breeders' Cup Juvenile Fillies Turf. Next year, she returned with the win in the Appalachian Stakes, the Sands Point Stakes, the Lake George Stakes, and the Garden City Stakes. As a four-year-old, she won the Beaugay Stakes and the Diana Stakes.

Owned and breed by Phillips Racing Partnership, she was trained by James J. Toner. Winter Memories has been ridden by Jose Lezcano until she lost in the Lake Placid Stakes when he was replaced with Javier Castellano.

Winter Memories was sired by El Prado, who also sired Paddy O'Prado. She is out of Silver Hawk mare Memories Of Silver.

== Racing career ==
=== 2010 season ===
On September 3, 2010, Winter Memories won her first start and defeated nine other opponents. She broke her maiden in a Maiden Special Weight going 1 1/16 miles at Saratoga. She was ridden by Jose Lezcano, carried 119 lbs and won by 1 1/2 lengths.

On October 3, 2010, Winter Memories won the 1 1/16 miles Miss Grillo Stakes by 5 lengths at Belmont Park.

On November 5, 2010, Winter Memories finished 2nd in Breeders' Cup Juvenile Fillies Turf as a favorite to More Than Real.

=== 2011 season ===
On April 21, 2011, Winter Memories won the 1 1/16 miles Grade 3 Appalachian Stakes at Keeneland. She was ridden by Jose Lezcano and won by a neck carrying 123 lbs.

On May 30, 2011, Winter Memories traveled back to Belmont Park where she won the Sands Point Stakes.

Winter Memories went on to win the Grade 2 Lake George Stakes on the July 27, 2011. She broke slow and was last in the six horse field. She had been stopped, but than she went to the outside and won by 4 1/2 lengths.

Winter Memories won her first grade 1 in the Garden City Stakes at Belmont Park. Like her other races, she made a late charge, but she had to overcome major traffic issues to win in a time of 1:51.06. Her late charge was so strong that racetrack announcer Tom Durkin called her a "grey bullet".

=== 2012 season ===
Winter Memories began her four-year-old campaign with a win in the Beaugay Stakes at Belmont Park in May but then disappointed in the Just A Game Stakes behind Tapitsfly. On July 28, 2012, Winter Memories took her second grade I in the Diana Stakes accelerating at the final bend for a length and half victory. The win saw her emulate her dam Memories of Silver, who won the race in 1998. After the race, her owner John Phillips described her as "a very, very good horse". During the home stretch of the Diana Stakes, however, Winter Memories jolted to the right and appeared to be injured. This spurred on extensive veterinary examinations in the days after the race. It was discovered that Winter Memories had been suffering form a degenerative bone disease for quite some time. On August 9, 2012, owner Phillips Racing Partnership and trainer James J. Toner announced her retirement from racing.

== Broodmare career ==
As a dam Winter Memories produced Winter Sunset, a filly who won black-type and listed stakes races at Fair Grounds Race Track and Horseshoe Indianapolis and placed in three Grade III races as a three-year-old, and Seasons, who placed in four stakes races in his career. Both horses were sired by three-time leading sire Tapit. Her last foal is a filly by Mendelssohn born in 2022.

== Death ==
In October 2023, Darby Dan Farm owner John Phillips confirmed that Winter Memories was euthanized earlier that year–on May 16–due to issues with her hind suspensory ligaments that made it difficult for her to stand.

== Career statistics ==
Finish	Jockey	Race	1st	2nd	3rd	Time
1st	Javier Castellano	Diana Handicap - GI	Winter Memories	Dream Peace	Zagora	1:48.50
1st	Eddie Castro	Beaugay Stakes - GIII	Winter Memories	Gitchee Goomie	Principal Role	1:43.87
2nd	Javier Castellano	Just A Game Stakes - G1	Tapitsfly	Winter Memories	Hungry Island	1:32.34
4th	Javier Castellano	Queen Elizabeth II Challenge Cup Stakes - G1	Together	Marketing Mix	Nereid	1:48.83
1st	Javier Castellano	Garden City Handicap - G1	Winter Memories	Theyskens’ Theory	More Than Real	1:51.06
4th	Jose Lezcano	Lake Placid Stakes - G2	Hungry Island	Kathmanblu	Dynamic Holiday	1:53.77
1st	Jose Lezcano	Lake George Stakes - G2	Winter Memories	Bellamy Star	More Than Real	1:41:57
1st	Jose Lezcano	Sands Point Stakes - G2	Winter Memories	Celestial Kitten	Parting Words	1:42:61
1st	Jose Lezcano	Appalachian Stakes - G3	Winter Memories	Dos Lunas	Parting Words	1:37:27
2nd	Jose Lezcano	Breeders' Cup Juvenile Fillies Turf - G1	More Than Real	Winter Memories	Kathmanblu	1:36:61
1st	Jose Lezcano	Miss Grillo Stakes - G3	Winter Memories	Arch Support	Fancy Point	1:45:69
1st	Jose Lezcano	Maiden Special Weight	Winter Memories	Town Flirt	Hungry Island	1:42:58

== Pedigree ==
Pedigree of Winter Memories (USA), Grey/roan filly, 2008
Sire El Prado 1989	Sadlers Wells; 1981	Northern Dancer	Nearctic
Sire El Prado 1989	Sadlers Wells; 1981	Northern Dancer	Natalma
Sire El Prado 1989	Sadlers Wells; 1981	Fairy Bridge	Bold Reason
Sire El Prado 1989	Sadlers Wells; 1981	Fairy Bridge	Special
Sire El Prado 1989	Lady Capulet; 1974	Sir Ivor	Sir Gaylord
Sire El Prado 1989	Lady Capulet; 1974	Sir Ivor	Attica
Sire El Prado 1989	Lady Capulet; 1974	Cap And Bells	Tom Fool
Sire El Prado 1989	Lady Capulet; 1974	Cap And Bells	Ghazni
Dam Memories Of Silver 1993	Silver Hawk; 1979	Roberto	Hail To Reason
Dam Memories Of Silver 1993	Silver Hawk; 1979	Roberto	Bramalea
Dam Memories Of Silver 1993	Silver Hawk; 1979	Gris Vitesse	Amerigo
Dam Memories Of Silver 1993	Silver Hawk; 1979	Gris Vitesse	Matchiche
Dam Memories Of Silver 1993	All My Memories; 1987	Little Current	Sea Bird
Dam Memories Of Silver 1993	All My Memories; 1987	Little Current	Luiana
Dam Memories Of Silver 1993	All My Memories; 1987	Java Man	Graustark
Dam Memories Of Silver 1993	All My Memories; 1987	Java Man	Golden Trail
