= More Than Real =

American-bred Thoroughbred racehorse

- Sire: More Than Ready
- Grandsire: Dehere
- Dam: Miss Seffens
- Sex: Filly
- Foaled: April 15th 2008
- Country: United States
- Colour: Chestnut
- Breeder: Santucket Stables
- Owner: Bobby Flay
- Trainer: Todd Pletcher
- Record: 5: 2-1-1
- Earnings: US$ 610,600

Major wins
- Breeders' Cup Juvenile Fillies Turf (2010)
- Last updated on June 26, 2010

More Than Real (foaled on April 15, 2008) is an American Thoroughbred racehorse. Out of the mare Miss Seffens, More Than Real was sired by More Than Ready. She is owned by Bobby Flay and trained by Todd Pletcher. More Than Real won the Breeders' Cup Juvenile Fillies Turf, where she beat the favourite Winter Memories who finished 2nd and it was a head back to the third finisher Kathmanblu. At two she also won her maiden race and she finished 2nd in the Natalma Stakes-Gr.3. In all three of her two-year-old races she was ridden by Garret Gomez. She made her first start as a three-year-old running in the Coronation Stakes at Royal Ascot, where she finished eleventh in the field of 12 fillies. She was ridden there by Olivier Peslier for the first time.

== Career statistics ==
Finish	Jockey	Race	Year	1st	2nd	3rd	Time
7th	C.Nakatani	QE II Challenge Cup-G1	2011	Together	Marketing Mix	Nereid	1:48:83
3rd	C.Nakatani	Garden City Stakes-G1	2011	Winter Memories	Theysken's Theory	More Than Real	1:51:06
3rd	J.Velazquez	Lake George Stakes-G2	2011	Winter Memories	Bellamy Star	More Than Real	1:41:57
11th	O.Peslier	Coronation Stakes-G1	2011	Immortal Verse	Nova Hawk	Barefoot Lady	1:42:75
1st	G.Gomez	BC Juvenile Fillies Turf-G1	2010	More Than Real	Winter Memories	Kathmanblu	1:36:61
2nd	G.Gomez	Natalma-G3	2010	New Normal	More Than Real	Street Chimes	1:36:51
1st	G.Gomez	Msw	2010	More Than Real	Dynamic Holiday	War Clan	1:42:33
