= Lake Placid Stakes =

- Class: Grade II
- Location: Saratoga Race Course; Saratoga Springs, New York, United States
- Inaugurated: 1984 (as Nijana Stakes)
- Race type: Thoroughbred – Flat racing
- Website: NYRA

Race information
- Distance: 1 mile
- Surface: Turf
- Track: Left-handed
- Qualification: Three-year-old fillies
- Weight: 124 lbs with allowances
- Purse: US$400,000 (2025)

The Lake Placid Stakes is a Grade II American Thoroughbred horse race for three-year-old fillies over a distance of one and one-sixteenths miles on the turf course scheduled annually in late July or early August at Saratoga Race Course in Saratoga Springs, New York. The event currently carries a purse of $400,000.

== History ==
The event was inaugurated on 20 August 1984 as the Nijana Stakes and was won by the Edward P. Evans owned Possible Mate as part of an entry with Miss Audimar leading throughout the race to win by 2 3/4 lengths in a time of 1:50 flat.

The event was named after the broodmare Nijana, who as a two-year-old won the Grade III Schuylerville Stakes in 1975 at Saratoga.

In 1986 the event was upgraded to the Grade III and in 1999 to Grade II.

In 1998 the event was renamed the Lake Placid Stakes after the village of Lake Placid, which is approximately 100 miles north from Saratoga in the Adirondack Mountains. In 1990 the event was taken off the turf due to the state of the turf track after prolonged inclement weather and was run on dirt. The 2010 event was also moved off the turf, which led to three horses scratched, leaving a field of three.

The Lake Placid was run in two divisions in 1988, 1991, and from 1992 through 1995.

In 2025 the distance of the event was decreased from 1 1/16 to 1 mile.

== Records ==
Speed record:

- 1 mile: 1:35.70 – May Day Ready (2025)
- 1 1/16 miles: 1:40.20 – Jinski's World (1991)
- 1 1/8 miles: 1:46.33 – Tenski (1998)

Margins:

- 7 1/4 lengths – It's Tea Time (2010)

Most wins by an owner:

- 2 – Joan & John Phillips (1996, 2002)
- 2 – Ken and Sarah Ramsey (1995, 2012)
- 2 – Paul P. Pompa Jr. (2008, 2019)

Most wins by a jockey:

- 6 – Jerry D. Bailey (1987, 1993, 1994, 1996, 2000, 2004)

Most wins by a trainer:

- 7 – Chad C. Brown (2018, 2019, 2021, 2022, 2023, 2024, 2026)

== Winners ==
Year	Winner	Jockey	Trainer	Owner	Distance	Time	Purse	Grade	Ref
Lake Placid Stakes
2026	Naomis (FR)	Flavien Prat	Chad C. Brown	Madaket Stables, LLC, Michael Dubb, Thirty Year Racing, and Michael J. Caruso	1 mile	1:35.72	$400,000	II	
2025	May Day Ready	Jose L. Ortiz	Joseph R. Lee	KatieRich Stables	1 mile	1:35.70	$400,000	II	
2024	Grayosh	Flavien Prat	Chad C. Brown	Flanagan Racing	1 1/16 miles	1:43.74	$200,000	II	
2023	Aspray	Flavien Prat	Chad C. Brown	Ran Jan Racing, Inc.	1 1/16 miles	1:42.85	$200,000	II	
2022	Haughty	Jose L. Ortiz	Chad C. Brown	Bradley Thoroughbreds, Belmar Racing & Breeding, Cambron Equine, & Team Hanley	1 1/16 miles	1:41.16	$200,000	II	
2021	Technical Analysis (IRE)	Jose L. Ortiz	Chad C. Brown	Klaravich Stables	1 1/16 miles	1:46.49	$200,000	II	
2020	Speaktomeofsummer	Joel Rosario	Christophe Clement	Waterford Stable	1 1/8 miles	1:49.44	$150,000	II	
2019	Varenka	Javier Castellano	H. Graham Motion	Augustin Stable	1 1/16 miles	1:43.68	$200,000	II	Dead heat
2019	Regal Glory	Luis Saez	Chad C. Brown	Paul P. Pompa Jr.	1 1/16 miles	1:43.68	$200,000	II	Dead heat
2018	Rushing Fall	Javier Castellano	Chad C. Brown	e Five Racing Thoroughbreds	1 1/8 miles	1:51.86	$300,000	II	
2017	Proctor's Ledge	Javier Castellano	Brendan P. Walsh	Patricia L. Moseley	1 1/8 miles	1:47.74	$294,000	II	
2016	Time and Motion	John R. Velazquez	James J. Toner	Philips Racing	1 1/8 miles	1:48.39	$300,000	II	
2015	Sentiero Italia	Joel Rosario	Kiaran P. McLaughlin	Godolphin Racing	1 1/8 miles	1:49.25	$294,000	II	
2014	Crown Queen	John R. Velazquez	William I. Mott	Besilu Stables	1 1/8 miles	1:47.91	$285,000	II	
2013	† Caroline Thomas	Rosie Napravnik	Barclay Tagg	Joyce B. Young	1 1/8 miles	1:47.36	$200,000	II	
2012	Stephanie's Kitten	John R. Velazquez	Wayne M. Catalano	Kenneth and Sarah Ramsey	1 1/8 miles	1:48.51	$200,000	II	
2011	Hungry Island	Alex O. Solis	Claude R. McGaughey III	Emory Hamilton	1 1/8 miles	1:53.77	$150,000	II	
2010	It's Tea Time	Julien R. Leparoux	George R. Arnold II	Alex G. Campbell Jr.	1 1/8 miles	1:54.52	$135,000	III	Off turf
2009	Shared Account	Edgar S. Prado	H. Graham Motion	Sagamore Farm	1 1/8 miles	1:54.62	$150,000	II	
2008	Backseat Rhythm	Javier Castellano	Patrick L. Reynolds	Paul P. Pompa Jr.	1 1/8 miles	1:50.69	$150,000	II	
2007	Sharp Susan	Kent J. Desormeaux	William I. Mott	IEAH Stables & WinStar Farm	1 1/8 miles	1:46.69	$150,000	II	
2006	Wait A While	Garrett K. Gomez	Todd A. Pletcher	Arindel Farm	1 1/8 miles	1:46.59	$147,000	II	
2005	Naissance Royale (IRE)	Edgar S. Prado	Christophe Clement	Monceaux Stable	1 1/8 miles	1:47.14	$150,000	II	
Lake Placid Handicap
2004	Spotlight (GB)	Jerry D. Bailey	Christophe Clement	Green Hills Farm	1 1/8 miles	1:50.54	$150,000	II	
2003	Sand Springs	Mark Guidry	Anthony L. Reinstedler	Willmott Stables	1 1/8 miles	1:49.03	$150,000	II	
2002	Wonder Again	Edgar S. Prado	James J. Toner	Joan & John Phillips	1 1/8 miles	1:49.24	$150,000	II	
2001	Snow Dance	Richard Migliore	John T. Ward Jr.	John C. Oxley	1 1/8 miles	1:47.42	$150,000	II	
2000	Gaviola	Jerry D. Bailey	William H. Turner Jr.	Twilite Farms	1 1/8 miles	1:48.02	$150,000	II	
1999	Badouizm	Robbie Davis	Brian P. Ange	Michael Fowler	1 1/8 miles	1:46.44	$150,000	II	
1998	Tenski	Richard Migliore	Linda L. Rice	Richard L. Golden	1 1/8 miles	1:46.33	$150,000	III	
Nijana Stakes
1997	Witchful Thinking	Shane Sellers	Niall M. O'Callaghan	Leslie Grimm	1 1/8 miles	1:47.65	$150,000	III	
1996	Memories of Silver	Jerry D. Bailey	James J. Toner	Joan Phillips	1 1/8 miles	1:47.80	$114,400	III	
1995	Class Kris	Pat Day	James E. Picou	Fred W. Hooper	1 1/16 miles	1:40.90	$112,300	III	Division 1
1995	Bail Out Becky	Shane Sellers	William I. Mott	Kenneth and Sarah Ramsey	1 1/16 miles	1:41.87	$112,800	III	Division 2
1994	Coronation Cup	Jerry D. Bailey	MacKenzie Miller	Kinghaven Farms	1 1/16 miles	1:43.81	$109,600	III	Division 1
1994	Alywow	Mike E. Smith	Roger L. Attfield	Rokeby Stables	1 1/16 miles	1:43.88	$111,100	III	Division 2
1993	Amal Hayati	Jerry D. Bailey	D. Wayne Lukas	Peter E. Blum	1 1/16 miles	1:41.58	$94,900	III	Division 1
1993	Statuette	Mike E. Smith	Richard A. DeStasio	Rashid Al Khalifa	1 1/16 miles	1:40.97	$93,300	III	Division 2
1992	Shannkara (IRE)	Mike E. Smith	Nicolas Clement	August Belmont IV	1 1/16 miles	1:40.80	$120,700	III	Division 1
1992	Heed	Mike E. Smith	William Badgett Jr.	Craig B. Singer	1 1/16 miles	1:41.84	$122,300	III	Division 2
1991	Jinski's World	José A. Santos	Leo O'Brien	Samuel H. Rogers Jr.	1 1/16 miles	1:40.20	$99,600	III	Division 1
1991	Grab the Green	Ángel Cordero Jr.	Barclay Tagg	Teresa M. Maher	1 1/16 miles	1:41.01	$98,800	III	Division 2
1990	Jefforee	José A. Santos	D. Wayne Lukas	Calumet Farm	1 1/8 miles	1:49.00	$100,500	III	Off turf
1989	Capades	Ángel Cordero Jr.	Richard O'Connell	Poma Stable	1 1/16 miles	1:41.00	$92,700	III	
1988	Betty Lobelia	José A. Santos	H. Allen Jerkens	Darby Dan Farm	1 1/16 miles	1:40.80	$88,800	III	Division 1
1988	Love You by Heart	Randy Romero	John M. Veitch	Bohemia Stable	1 1/16 miles	1:41.60	$88,800	III	Division 2
1987	Graceful Darby	Jerry D. Bailey	John M. Veitch	James W. Phillips	1 1/16 miles	1:41.40	$84,600	III	
1986	An Empress	José A. Santos	Laz Barrera	Harbor View Farm	1 1/16 miles	1:42.00	$87,000	III	
1985	Videogenic	Robbie Davis	Gasper S. Moschera	Albert Davis	1 1/16 miles	1:41.20	$54,200		
1984	§ Possible Mate	Donald MacBeth	Philip G. Johnson	Edward P. Evans	1 1/8 miles	1:50.00	$43,450		

Legend:
Turf Dirt
Notes:
§ Ran as an entry
† In the 2013 event Nellie Cashman finished first but was disqualified for drifting in the straight and placed third. Caroline Thomas was declared the winner.

== See also ==
- List of American and Canadian Graded races
