= Belmont Oaks =

Belmont Oaks Stakes
- Class: Grade I
- Location: Belmont Park; Elmont, New York, United States
- Inaugurated: 1979 (as Rare Perfume Stakes at Aqueduct Racetrack)
- Race type: Thoroughbred – Flat racing
- Website: www.nyra.com

Race information
- Distance: 1 3/16 miles (9.5 furlongs)
- Surface: Turf
- Track: Left-handed
- Qualification: Three-year-old fillies
- Weight: Northern hemisphere:125 lbs Southern hemisphere:121 lbs
- Purse: US$600,000 (2026)

The Belmont Oaks Stakes is an American Thoroughbred horse race held annually in early July at Belmont Park in Elmont, New York. A Grade I event open to three-year-old fillies and raced over a distance of a mile and one quarter. The current purse is $600,000.

In 2024 Belmont Park was shut down due to a major two-year refurbishing program. Races, including the Belmont Oaks, were transferred temporarily to Aqueduct Race Track, another NYRA facility. There, the Oaks was run at a mile and three sixteenths.

The Belmont Oaks is a Breeders' Cup Challenge "Win and You're In" event for the Breeders' Cup Filly and Mare Turf.

In 199, the Belmont Oaks became a Grade I race. It was previously known as the Garden City Stakes then it was modified to the Garden City Breeders' Cup, and the Rare Perfume before that. The latter name was in honor of George Widener's racing mare, Rare Perfume. The Garden City name referred to Garden City, New York, a village in the Town of Hempstead in central Nassau County located near the racetrack.

== Records ==
Speed record: (at current distance of 1 3/16 miles)

- 1:53.42 - Cinderella's Dream (2024) (Aqueduct NCR)
- At distance of 1 1/4 miles) : 1:58.71 – Athena (2018)

Most wins by an owner:

- 3 – Tabor, Magnier & Derrick Smith (2014, 2018, 2021)
- 2 – Ogden Phipps (1981, 1987)
- 2 – John W. Phillips (2002, 2011)

Most wins by a jockey:

- 4 – José A. Santos (1989, 1990, 1991, 2004)

Most wins by a trainer:

- 6 – Chad C. Brown (2012, 2013, 2014, 2015, 2017, 2022)

== Winners ==
Year	Winner	Jockey	Trainer	Owner	Distance (Miles)	Time	Win $
Belmont Oaks Stakes
2026	Kensington Lane (IRE)	Joel Rosario	Donnacha O'Brien	Agave Racing Stable, Medallion Racing & Evan Trommer	1-1/8	1:47.77	$275,000
Belmont Oaks Invitational Stakes
2025	Fionn	Flavien Prat	Brad H. Cox	George Messina and Michael Lee	1-1/8	1:44.84	$275,000
2024	Cinderella's Dream (GB)	William Buick	Charles Appleby	Godolphin	1-3/16	1:53.42	$275,000
2023	Aspen Grove (IRE)	Oisin Murphy	James Stack	Glen Hill Farm and Mrs. John Magnier	1-1/4	2:04.09	$275,000
2022	McKulick (GB)	Irad Ortiz Jr.	Chad Brown	Klaravich Stables	1-1/4	1:59.62	$375,000
2021	Santa Barbara (IRE)	Ryan Moore	Aidan O'Brien	Derrick Smith, Mrs. John Magnier, Michael Tabor, & Westerberg	1-1/4	2:03.76	$375,000
2020	Magic Attitude	Javier Castellano	Arnaud Delacour	Lael Stables	1-1/4	2:01.14	$137,500
2019	Concrete Rose	Julien Leparoux	George R. Arnold II	Ashbrook Farm	1-1/4	1:59.97	$400,000
2018	Athena	Ryan Moore	Aidan O'Brien	Tabor, Magnier & Smith	1-1/4	1:58.71	$600,000
2017	New Money Honey	Javier Castellano	Chad C. Brown	E Five Racing	1-1/4	1:59.89	$600,000
2016	Catch A Glimpse	Florent Geroux	Mark E. Casse	Barber, Ambler and Windways Farm	1-1/4	1:59.87	$600,000
2015	Lady Eli	Irad Ortiz Jr.	Chad C. Brown	Sheep Pond Partners	1-1/4	1:59.27	$600,000
2014	Minorette	Joel Rosario	Chad C. Brown	Tabor, Magnier and Smith	1-1/4	2:01.64	$600,000
Garden City Stakes
2013	Alterite (FR)	John R. Velazquez	Chad C. Brown	Martin S. Schwartz	1-1/8	1:50.55	$300,000
2012	Samitar	Ramon Domínguez	Chad C. Brown	Martin S. Schwartz	1-1/8	1:48.74	$180,000
2011	Winter Memories	Javier Castellano	James J. Toner	Phillips Racing Partnership	1-1/8	1:51.06	$150,000
2010	Check the Label	Ramon Domínguez	H. Graham Motion	Lael Stables	1-1/8	1:51.41	$150,000
2009	Miss World	Cornelio Velásquez	Christophe Clement	Waratah Thoroughbreds	1-1/8	1:53.55	$180,000
2008	Backseat Rhythm	Javier Castellano	Patrick L. Reynolds	Paul P. Pompa Jr.	1-1/8	1:51.82	$150,000
2007	Alexander Tango	Shaun Bridgmohan	Tommy Stack	Noel O' Callaghan	1-1/8	1:48.97	$120,000
Garden City Breeders' Cup Stakes
2006	Magnificent Song	Garrett Gomez	Todd A. Pletcher	Parrish, Malcolm, Edward	1-1/8	1:48.48	$150,000
2005	Luas Line	John Velazquez	David Wachman	Evelyn M. Stockwell	1-1/8	1:45.62	$180,000
2004	Lucifer's Stone	José A. Santos	Linda L. Rice	Team Solaris Stable	1-1/8	1:48.88	$180,000
Garden City Breeders' Cup Handicap
2003	Indy Five Hundred	Pat Day	Robert Barbara	Georgica Stable	1-1/8	1:48.44	$150,000
2002	Wonder Again	Edgar Prado	James J. Toner	Joan G. & John W. Phillips	1-1/8	1:47.33	$150,000
2001	Voodoo Dancer	Corey Nakatani	Christophe Clement	Green Hills Farms	1-1/8	1:47.69	$150,000
2000	Gaviola	Jerry D. Bailey	William H. Turner Jr.	Twilite Farms	1-1/8	1:48.89	$150,000
1999	Perfect Sting	Pat Day	Joseph Orseno	Stronach Stable	1-1/8	1:49.41	$129,900
1998	Pharatta-IR	Corey Nakatani	Carlos Laffon-Parias	Hinojosa Dario	1-1/8	1:47.10	$129,720
Rare Perfume Breeders' Cup Handicap
1997	Auntie Mame	Jerry D. Bailey	Angel Penna Jr.	Lazy F Ranch	1-1/8	1:48.49	$128,040
1996	True Flare	Gary Stevens	Robert J. Frankel	Juddmonte Farms	1-1/16	1:42.58	$128,460
Rare Perfume Handicap
1995	Perfect Arc	John Velazquez	Angel Penna Jr.	Brazil Stables	1-1/16	1:42.35	$101,070
1994	Jade Flush	Robbie Davis	Nicholas P. Zito	Condren, et al.	1-1/16	1:46.79	$67,140
Rare Perfume Stakes
1993	Sky Beauty	Mike E. Smith	H. Allen Jerkens	Georgia E. Hofmann	1	1:35.76	$68,400
1992	November Snow	Chris Antley	H. Allen Jerkens	Earle I. Mack	1	1:35.91	$66,480
1991	Dazzle Me Jolie	José A. Santos	Willard J. Thompson	Jolie Stanzione	1	1:35.61	$72,000
1990	Aishah	José A. Santos	Flint S. Schulhofer	Helen K. Groves	1	1:35.40	$57,690
1989	Highest Glory	José A. Santos	D. Wayne Lukas	H. Joseph Allen	1	1:37.20	$70,440
1988	Topicount	Ángel Cordero Jr.	H. Allen Jerkens	Centennial Farms	1	1:38.00	$82,260
1987	Personal Ensign	Randy Romero	Claude R. McGaughey III	Ogden Phipps	1	1:36.60	$82,140
1986	Life At The Top	Chris McCarron	D. Wayne Lukas	Lloyd R. French	1	1:34.40	$51,210
1985	Kamikaze Rick	Ángel Cordero Jr.	John Parisella	Theodore M. Sabarese	1	1:36.00	$50,490
1984	Given	Matthew Vigliotti	Alfino Pepino	Ronald S. Green	1-1/16	1:43.40	$42,960
1983	Pretty Sensible	Alfredo Smith Jr.	George Travers	John Zervas	1	1:37.80	$33,600
1982	Nafees	Jorge Velásquez	Richard T. DeStasio	Albert Fried Jr.	1	1:38.40	$33,120
1981	Banner Gala	Ángel Cordero Jr.	Angel Penna Sr.	Ogden Phipps	1	1:35.60	$33,900
1980	Mitey Lively	Jorge Velásquez	Douglas R. Peterson	Tayhill Stable	1	1:36.40	$33,480
1979	Danielle B.	Ruben Hernandez	John O. Hertler	Our Precious Stable	1-1/16	1:45.40	$33,000
