= Listen (horse) =

Irish-bred Thoroughbred racehorse

- Sire: Sadler's Wells
- Grandsire: Northern Dancer
- Dam: Brigid
- Damsire: Irish River
- Sex: Mare
- Foaled: 3 February 2005
- Country: Ireland
- Colour: Bay
- Breeder: Brittas House Stud
- Owner: Derrick Smith, Sue Magnier and Michael Tabor
- Trainer: Aidan O'Brien
- Record: 6: 2-2-0
- Earnings: £203,101

Major wins
- Saoire Stakes (2007); Fillies' Mile (2007)

Listen (foaled 3 February 2005) is an Irish Thoroughbred racehorse and broodmare. She showed her best form as a two-year-old in 2007 she won the Listed Saoire Stakes on her debut, finished second in both the Debutante Stakes and the Moyglare Stud Stakes and then recorded her biggest success in the Group One Fillies' Mile. Her subsequent racing career was compromised by injury and she made little impact in two races as a three-year-old. She has had some success as a broodmare in Japan.

== Background ==
Listen is a bay mare bred in Ireland by the Brittas House Stud. She was from the twentieth crop of foals sired by Sadler's Wells, who won the Irish 2000 Guineas, Eclipse Stakes and Irish Champion Stakes in 1984 went on to be the Champion sire on fourteen occasions. Listen's dam Brigid won one minor race in France as a three-year-old in 1994 before being retired to broodmare duty where she also produced Sequoyah, the dam of Henrythenavigator.

Listen entered the ownership of the Coolmore Stud organisation and was sent into training with Aidan O'Brien at Ballydoyle. Like many of the Coolmore racehorses the details of her ownership changed from race to race: she was sometimes listed as being owned by Derrick Smith whilst on other occasions she was described as the property of a partnership involving Smith, Susan Magnier and Michael Tabor.

== Racing career ==
=== 2007: two-year-old season ===
On her racecourse debut, Listen was one of seven fillies to contest the Listed Saoire Stakes over six furlongs at the Curragh on 29 June. Ridden by Kieren Fallon she started 7/2 second favourite behind the Jim Bolger-trained Saoirse Abu. After being restrained towards the rear of the field she took the lead a furlong and a half from the finish, went clear of her opponents and won by one and a quarter lengths from Tuscan Evening with Saoirse Abu in fifth. On 12 August at the same track, the filly was moved up in class and distance and started 9/10 favourite for the Group Two Debutante Stakes over seven furlongs. After racing last of the nine runners for most of the way she finished strongly but failed by a neck to overhaul the Dermot Weld-trained Campfire Glow. Despite her defeat in the Debutante, Listen was made odds-on favourite for the Group One Moyglare Stud Stakes over the same course and distance on 2 September. She was held up by Fallon before making steady progress in the last quarter mile and finishing second, a length and a half behind the winner Saoirse Abu.

On her final appearance of the season, Listen and Saoirse Abu met for the third time when the two fillies were sent to England to contest the Group One Fillies' Mile at Ascot Racecourse on 29 September. The French challenger Proviso (winner of the Prix du Calvados) started favourite ahead of Listen and Saoirse Abu, whilst the best-fancied of the four British-trained fillies was the May Hill Stakes runner-up Kotsi. Ridden by Johnny Murtagh, Listen tracked the leaders before taking the lead a furlong out and won by a length from Proviso with Saoirse Abu two and a half lengths back in third place. The racecourse stewards held an inquiry into what was described as "a prolonged and unattractive wrestle" between Murtagh and Proviso's jockey Stéphane Pasquier as the riders battled for position in the early stages of the race, but allowed the result to stand. After the race Listen was made favourite for the following year's Epsom Oaks and was described by Murtagh as being potentially "the next Peeping Fawn". O'Brien commented "She's a brave filly, and when the gap appeared she put her head down and battled for it. That's the hallmark of a good filly. I think she's exciting".

=== 2008: three-year-old season ===
Listen missed most of her second season after sustaining a training injury in April. She reappeared after an absence of over eleven months in the Group One Matron Stakes over one mile at Leopardstown Racecourse on 7 September. Ridden by Colm O'Donoghue she was restrained at the rear of the ten runner field before making some progress in the straight and finishing fifth, two and a quarter lengths behind the winner Lush Lashes. On 4 October she was sent to England for the Sun Chariot Stakes and started 5/1 second favourite behind the French-trained Darjina. She was never in contention at any stage and finished last of the ten runners behind Halfway to Heaven.

== Breeding record ==
Listen was retired from racing to become a broodmare for Coolmore before being exported to Northern Farm in Japan. She has produced eight named foals and six winners:

- Though, a bay filly, foaled in 2010, sired by Dansili. Failed to win in four races.
- Ascolti, dark bay or brown filly, 2011, by Danehill Dancer. Won two races.
- Touching Speech, bay filly, 2012, by Deep Impact. Won three races including the Grade 2 Rose Stakes.
- New World Power, bay colt, 2013, by Deep Impact. Sold for ¥260,000,000 at the Japan Racing Horse Association select sale on 14 July 2014. Won one race.
- Move The World, bay colt, 2014, by Deep Impact, won three races
- Rinforzando, bay filly, 2015, by Deep Impact, won one race
- Satono Lux, bay colt, 2016, by Deep Impact, won three races
- Timing Heart, bay colt, 2017, by Deep Impact

== Pedigree ==
Pedigree of Listen (IRE), bay mare, 2005
Sire Sadler's Wells (USA) 1981	Northern Dancer (CAN); 1961	Nearctic	Nearco
Sire Sadler's Wells (USA) 1981	Northern Dancer (CAN); 1961	Nearctic	Lady Angela
Sire Sadler's Wells (USA) 1981	Northern Dancer (CAN); 1961	Natalma	Native Dancer
Sire Sadler's Wells (USA) 1981	Northern Dancer (CAN); 1961	Natalma	Almahmoud
Sire Sadler's Wells (USA) 1981	Fairy Bridge (USA); 1975	Bold Reason	Hail To Reason
Sire Sadler's Wells (USA) 1981	Fairy Bridge (USA); 1975	Bold Reason	Lalun
Sire Sadler's Wells (USA) 1981	Fairy Bridge (USA); 1975	Special	Forli
Sire Sadler's Wells (USA) 1981	Fairy Bridge (USA); 1975	Special	Thong
Dam Brigid (USA) 1991	Irish River (FR); 1976	Riverman	Never Bend
Dam Brigid (USA) 1991	Irish River (FR); 1976	Riverman	River Lady
Dam Brigid (USA) 1991	Irish River (FR); 1976	Irish Star	Klairon
Dam Brigid (USA) 1991	Irish River (FR); 1976	Irish Star	Botany Bay
Dam Brigid (USA) 1991	Luv Luvin (USA); 1977	Raise A Native	Native Dancer
Dam Brigid (USA) 1991	Luv Luvin (USA); 1977	Raise A Native	Raise You
Dam Brigid (USA) 1991	Luv Luvin (USA); 1977	Ringing Bells	Bold Lad
Dam Brigid (USA) 1991	Luv Luvin (USA); 1977	Ringing Bells	Prayer Bell (Family: 9-b)
