= Tapitsfly =

American-bred Thoroughbred racehorse

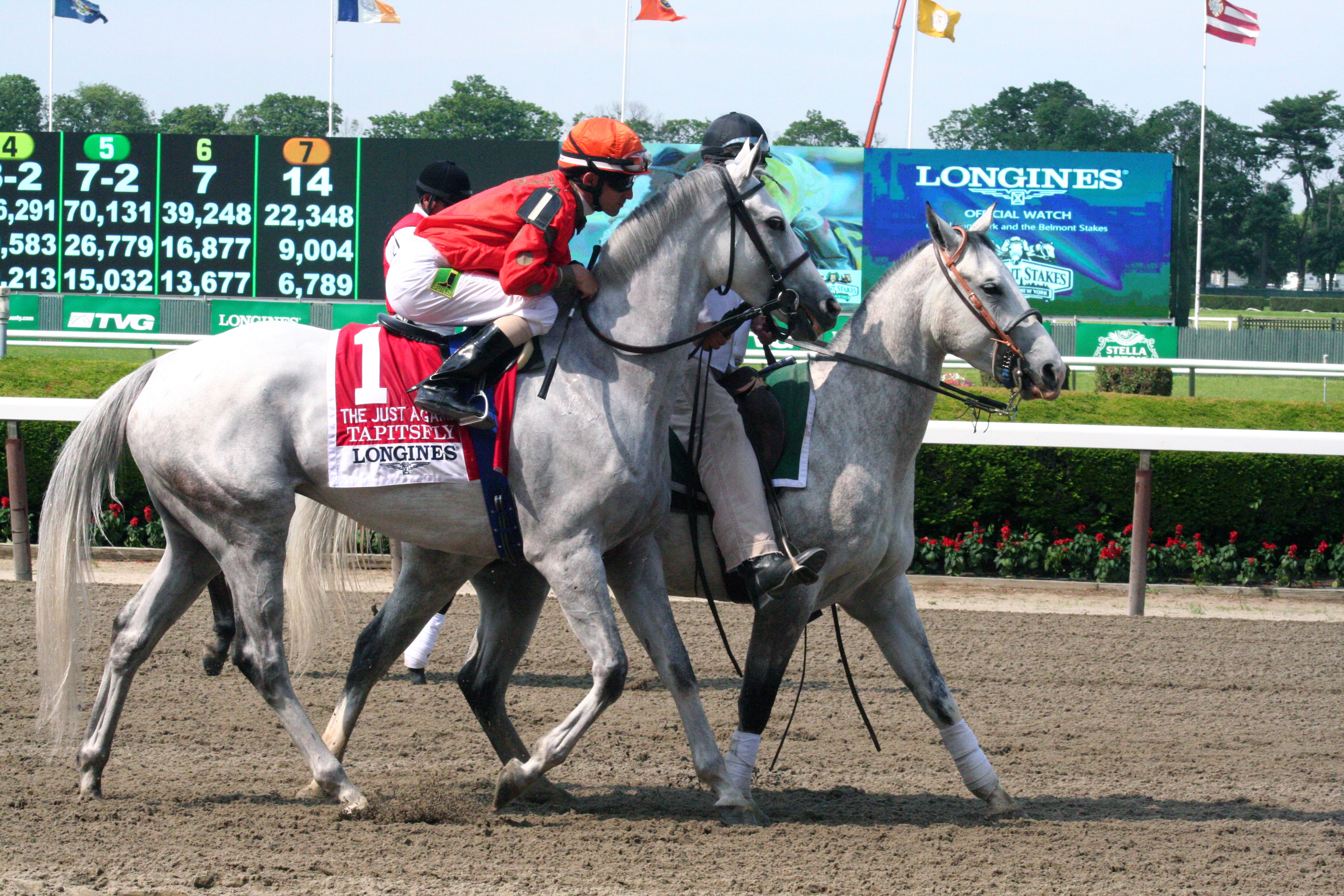
- Sire: Tapit
- Grandsire: Pulpit
- Dam: Flying Marlin
- Damsire: Marlin
- Sex: Mare
- Foaled: February 25, 2007
- Died: March 2, 2018 (aged 11)
- Country: United States
- Colour: Grey
- Breeder: Frank L. Jones, Jr.
- Owner: 1) Frank L. Jones Jr. 2) Katsumi Yoshida (Nov. 2012)
- Trainer: Dale Romans
- Record: 24 Starts: 7 - 6 - 4
- Earnings: US$$1,495,503

Major wins
- P. G. Johnson Stakes (2009); Breeders' Cup Juvenile Fillies Turf (2009); Honey Fox Stakes (2012); Just A Game Stakes (2012); First Lady Stakes (2012)

Tapitsfly (February 25, 2007 - March 2, 2018) was an American Thoroughbred racehorse.

== Background ==
Tapitsfly is a gray mare from the second crop of three-time leading sire Tapit. Tapit won the 2004 Wood Memorial Stakes as a three-year-old and went on to finish ninth in both the Kentucky Derby and Pennsylvania Derby that year before retiring to stud, where he has also sired 2008 champion 2-year-old filly Stardom Bound, 2011 champion 2-year-old colt Hansen, 2014 champion 3-year-old filly Untapable, Belmont Stakes winners Tonalist, Creator and Tapwrit, and many other stakes winners.

Tapitsfly is the third foal of her dam Flying Marlin, who raced primarily in allowance and allowance optional claiming company and won four of her 18 races. Her only stakes appearance was during her four-year-old season, where she finished fifth in Gulfstream Park's Orchid Handicap.

== Racing career ==
During her racing career, Tapitsfly raced as a homebred for Frank L. Jones Jr. and was trained by Dale Romans.

=== 2009: two-year-old season ===
Tapitsfly's first race was on May 21, 2009, in a maiden special weight on dirt at Churchill Downs, where she finished fifth after being shuffled back early. She made two more attempts to break her maiden at Churchill Downs before winning a Saratoga Race Course maiden special weight on August 3, 2009. The race had been scheduled for the turf but was moved to the dirt track. Going off as the post-time favorite, Tapitsfly won by 2 3/4 lengths under jockey Robby Albarado.

Tapitsfly's next race was the P. G. Johnson Stakes, also at Saratoga. The race was a 1 1/16 mile race on the turf for two-year-old fillies. Entering the stretch, she was challenged by the post-time favorite, Smart Seattle, but dug in and went on to win by 1 1/4 lengths.

Tapitsfly prepared for a start in the Breeders' Cup Juvenile Fillies Turf by entering the Miss Grillo Stakes at Belmont Park. The race was scheduled to be on the turf course but had to be taken off the turf and run on the dirt course due to heavy rain. Because of the move, six fillies scratched out of the Miss Grillo, leaving Tapitsfly with only two rivals. She ended up finishing second to the maiden Dad's Crazy, who finished 3 1/4 lengths ahead.

Tapitsfly's final race of 2009 was the Breeders' Cup Juvenile Fillies Turf, held at Santa Anita Park. Going off at odds of 9–1, she pressed the pace set by Rose Catherine from second for most of the race. Tapitsfly got her head in front at the eighth pole and hung on to win the race in a final time of 1:34.25.

=== 2011: four-year-old season ===
Tapitsfly missed the entirety of her three-year-old season. She had an ankle chip removed early in 2010, and trainer Dale Romans said that she had suffered "additional setbacks" that prevented her from racing at three.

Tapitsfly's only win as a four-year-old came in an allowance optional claiming race at Gulfstream Park on April 2, 2011. Other than that win, she made eight other starts in 2011, hitting the board in four of them. Most notably, she finished second in the Grade II Ballston Spa Stakes at Saratoga to the German mare Daveron.

=== 2012: five-year-old season ===
Tapitsfly returned to her Grade I-winning form at five. On June 9, 2012, she took the Grade I Just A Game Stakes on the Belmont Stakes undercard from the favorite, Winter Memories, wiring the field and coming very close to equaling the course record. She also won the Grade I First Lady Stakes at Keeneland on October 6, 2012. Going off as the second choice, she went out six wide going into the stretch and overtook her rivals to win by half a length. Her other stakes win that year was a victory in Gulfstream Park's Honey Fox Stakes.

== Retirement ==
A month after her victory in the First Lady Stakes, Tapitsfly went through the sales ring at the Fasig-Tipton November sale. While Frank Jones Jr. does breed horses, he did not want to keep Tapitsfly for her broodmare career. Before the sale, Jones told the Daily Racing Form "I’m not set up to be having breeding stock worth that much money. I’m not a big-time breeder, and she’s a big-time horse. I’m 99 percent sure I’m going to sell her."

At the Fasig-Tipton sale, she sold for $1,850,000 to Katsumi Yoshida of Shadai Stallion Station and was sent to Japan. Her first foal was Gran Alegria who won the 2019 Oka Sho and has become the dominant force in Sprinter and Mile races in Japan between 2019 and 2021. Her second foal, a colt named Blutgang, was humanely put down not long after he won his maiden race due to lower back atrophy caused by cervical spinal stenosis in July 2019.

Tapitsfly is listed as deceased on March 2, 2018, by the Japanese Stud Book Database Service.

== Pedigree ==
Pedigree of Tapitsfly, gray or roan filly, February 25, 2007
Sire Tapit 2001	Pulpit	A. P. Indy	Seattle Slew
Sire Tapit 2001	Pulpit	A. P. Indy	Weekend Surprise
Sire Tapit 2001	Pulpit	Preach	Mr. Prospector
Sire Tapit 2001	Pulpit	Preach	Narrate
Sire Tapit 2001	Tap Your Heels	Unbridled	Fappiano
Sire Tapit 2001	Tap Your Heels	Unbridled	Gana Facil
Sire Tapit 2001	Tap Your Heels	Ruby Slippers	Nijinsky
Sire Tapit 2001	Tap Your Heels	Ruby Slippers	Moon Glitter
Dam Flying Marlin 1999	Marlin	Sword Dance (IRE)	Nijinsky
Dam Flying Marlin 1999	Marlin	Sword Dance (IRE)	Rosa Mundi
Dam Flying Marlin 1999	Marlin	Syrian Summer	Damascus
Dam Flying Marlin 1999	Marlin	Syrian Summer	Special Warmth
Dam Flying Marlin 1999	Morning Dove	Fortunate Prospect	Northern Prospect
Dam Flying Marlin 1999	Morning Dove	Fortunate Prospect	Fortunate Bid
Dam Flying Marlin 1999	Morning Dove	Pink Dove	Argument (FR)
Dam Flying Marlin 1999	Morning Dove	Pink Dove	Perfect Pigeon

Tapitsfly is inbred 4 × 4 to Nijinsky, which means that this stallion appears twice in the fourth generation of her pedigree. Tapitsfly is also inbred 4 × 5 × 5 to Mr. Prospector (as the sire of Fappiano and Northern Prospect) and 5x5 to Secretariat (as the sire of Weekend Surprise and Rosa Mundi).
