= Balanchine Stakes =

Flat horse race in Ireland

Balanchine Stakes (Airlie Stud Stakes)
- Class: Group 2
- Location: Curragh Racecourse; County Kildare, Ireland
- Inaugurated: 2005
- Race type: Flat / Thoroughbred
- Sponsor: Airlie Stud
- Website: Curragh

Race information
- Distance: 6f (1,207 metres)
- Surface: Turf
- Track: Straight
- Qualification: Two-year-old fillies
- Weight: 9 st 0 lb Penalties; 3 lb for Group winners
- Purse: €112,800 (2022); 1st: €70,800

Balanchine Stakes
2026
Sun Goddess	Green Empress	Beibhinn

Previous years
2025
Beautify	Lady Iman	Skydance
2024
Truly Enchanting	California Dreamer	January
2023
Matrika	Gunzburg	Ashwiyaa
2022
Statuette	Badb	Matilda Picotte
2021
Velocidad	Yet	Cheerupsleepyjean

2020-2011
2020
Aloha Star	Frenetic	Mother Earth
2019
Albigna	Precious Moments	Peace Charter
2018
So Perfect	Skitter Scatter	Cava
2017
Clemmie	Butterscotch	Mamba Noire
2016
Roly Poly	Seafront	Elusive Beauty
2015
Most Beautiful	Only Mine	Miss Elizabeth
2014
I Am Beautiful	Jeanne Girl	Quinta Verde
2013
Bye Bye Birdie	Heart Focus	Clenor
2012
Sendmylovetorose	True Verdict	Slope
2011
Experience	Somasach	Naseem Sea

2010-2005
2010
Seeharn	Gatamalata	Moonlit Garden
2009
Long Lashes	Elusive Galaxy	Gold Bubbles
2008
Shimah	Chintz	What's Up Pussycat
2007
Listen	Tuscan Evening	Charlotte Bronte
2006
Gaudeamus	The Real Thing	Simonetta
2005
Sahara Princess	Sandie	Ugo Fire

The Balanchine Stakes, also known as the Airlie Stud Stakes, is a Group 2 flat horse race in Ireland open to two-year-old thoroughbred fillies. It is run at the Curragh over a distance of 6 furlongs (1,207 metres), and it is scheduled to take place each year in late June or early July.

The event's registered title honours Balanchine, a successful filly whose victories included the Irish Derby in 1994. The race was established in 2005, and it was originally classed at Listed level. The first two runnings were contested over 7 furlongs.

The race's distance was cut to 6 furlongs in 2007, and for a period it was known as the Saoire Stakes. It reverted to its former name in 2009, and from this point its sponsored title was the Ballygallon Stud Stakes.

The Balanchine Stakes was promoted to Group 3 status in 2011. In 2019 the race received a further boost when it was one of 3 Group 3 race's across Europe promoted to Group 2 status following the European Pattern Committee's review for 2019. It is now sponsored by Airlie Stud, and it is held on the second day of the Curragh's three-day Irish Derby Festival meeting, as part of the supporting card to the Group 1 Pretty Polly Stakes.

== Records ==
Leading jockey (9 wins):

- Ryan Moore - Most Beautiful (2015), Roly Poly (2016), Clemmie (2017), So Perfect (2018), Statuette (2022), Matrika (2023), Truly Enchanting (2024), Beautify (2025), Sun Goddess (2026)

Leading trainer (11 wins):

- Aidan O'Brien - Listen (2007), Bye Bye Birdie (2013), I Am Beautiful (2014), Roly Poly (2016), Clemmie (2017), So Perfect (2018), Statuette (2022), Matrika (2023), Truly Enchanting (2024), Beautify (2025), Sun Goddess (2026)

== Winners ==
Year	Winner	Jockey	Trainer	Time
2005	Sahara Princess	Johnny Murtagh	Jessica Harrington	1:25.60
2006	Gaudeamus	Kevin Manning	Jim Bolger	1:27.70
2007	Listen	Kieren Fallon	Aidan O'Brien	1:15.40
2008	Shimah	Declan McDonogh	Kevin Prendergast	1:12.97
2009	Long Lashes	Fran Berry	Jessica Harrington	1:15.24
2010	Seeharn	Declan McDonogh	Kevin Prendergast	1:12.66
2011	Experience	Wayne Lordan	David Wachman	1:12.36
2012	Sendmylovetorose	Colm O'Donoghue	Andrew Oliver	1:16.92
2013	Bye Bye Birdie	Joseph O'Brien	Aidan O'Brien	1:10.94
2014	I Am Beautiful	Seamie Heffernan	Aidan O'Brien	1:12.56
2015	Most Beautiful	Ryan Moore	David Wachman	1:11.91
2016	Roly Poly	Ryan Moore	Aidan O'Brien	1:15.32
2017	Clemmie	Ryan Moore	Aidan O'Brien	1:11.87
2018	So Perfect	Ryan Moore	Aidan O'Brien	1:12.34
2019	Albigna	Shane Foley	Jessica Harrington	1:12.90
2020	Aloha Star	Chris Hayes	Fozzy Stack	1:13.59
2021	Velocidad	Declan McDonogh	Joseph O'Brien	1:15.29
2022	Statuette	Ryan Moore	Aidan O'Brien	1:13.64
2023	Matrika	Ryan Moore	Aidan O'Brien	1:10.43
2024	Truly Enchanting	Ryan Moore	Aidan O'Brien	1:14.40
2025	Beautify	Ryan Moore	Aidan O'Brien	1:10.59
2026	Sun Goddess	Ryan Moore	Aidan O'Brien	1:12.52

== See also ==
- Horse racing in Ireland
- List of Irish flat horse races
