= Perfect Sting =

American-bred Thoroughbred racehorse

- Sire: Red Ransom
- Grandsire: Roberto
- Dam: Valid Victress
- Damsire: Valid Appeal
- Sex: Mare
- Foaled: 1996
- Country: United States
- Colour: Bay
- Breeder: Adena Springs Farm
- Owner: Stronach Stables
- Trainer: Joe Orseno
- Record: 21: 14-3-0
- Earnings: US$2,202,042

Major wins
- Green River Stakes (1998); Garden City Handicap (1999); Queen Elizabeth II Challenge Cup Stakes (1999); Sands Point Stakes (1999); Captive Miss Stakes (1999); Diana Handicap (2000); New York Handicap (2000); Beaugay Handicap (2000); Just a Game Handicap (2000); Black Helen Handicap (2001) Breeders' Cup wins: Breeders' Cup Filly & Mare Turf (2000)

Awards
- American Champion Female Turf Horse (2000)
- Last updated on 15 September 2020

Perfect Sting (foaled 1996 in Kentucky) is an American Thoroughbred Championracehorse and broodmare. Bred by Frank Stronach's Adena Springs Farm and raced by his Stronach Stables, she was sired by Red Ransom and out of the mare Valid Victress.

Perfect Sting raced from age two through five during which time she won the 2000 Breeders' Cup Filly & Mare Turf for trainer Joe Orseno and was voted that year's American Champion Female Turf Horse. She was retired to broodmare duty after her 2001 campaign having won fourteen of twenty-one starts with career earnings of US$2,202,042.

== Pedigree ==
Pedigree of Perfect Sting, bay mare, April 27, 1996
Sire Red Ransom	Roberto	Hail To Reason	Turn-To
Sire Red Ransom	Roberto	Hail To Reason	Nothirdchance
Sire Red Ransom	Roberto	Bramalea	Nashua
Sire Red Ransom	Roberto	Bramalea	Rarelea
Sire Red Ransom	Arabia	Damascus	Sword Dancer
Sire Red Ransom	Arabia	Damascus	Kerala
Sire Red Ransom	Arabia	Christmas Wind	Nearctic
Sire Red Ransom	Arabia	Christmas Wind	Bally Free
Dam Valid Victress	Valid Appeal	In Reality	Intentionally
Dam Valid Victress	Valid Appeal	In Reality	My Dear Girl
Dam Valid Victress	Valid Appeal	Desert Trial	Moslem Chief
Dam Valid Victress	Valid Appeal	Desert Trial	Scotch Verdict
Dam Valid Victress	Grecian Victory	Dr. Fager	Rough'n Tumble
Dam Valid Victress	Grecian Victory	Dr. Fager	Aspidistra
Dam Valid Victress	Grecian Victory	Greek Victress	Victoria Park
Dam Valid Victress	Grecian Victory	Greek Victress	Heliostrings (family: 20-a)
