= Maram (horse) =

American-bred Thoroughbred racehorse

- Sire: Sahm
- Grandsire: Mr. Prospector
- Dam: American Dreamer
- Damsire: Quest For Fame
- Sex: Filly
- Foaled: 2006
- Country: United States
- Colour: Dark Bay/Brown
- Breeder: Palides Investments N. V., Inc. & Hair 'Em Corporation
- Owner: Karen N. Woods & Saud bin Khaled
- Trainer: Chad C. Brown
- Record: 7: 4-1-1
- Earnings: US$818,720

Major wins
- Miss Grillo Stakes (2008); John Hettinger Stakes (2009) Breeders' Cup wins: Breeders' Cup Juvenile Fillies Turf (2008)

Maram (February 10, 2006 – September 6, 2012 in Kentucky) is an American Thoroughbred racehorse best known for winning the 2008 Breeders' Cup Juvenile Fillies Turf.

In 2009, Maram won the John Hettinger Stakes at Saratoga Race Course.

Maram was euthanized on September 6, 2012, after an acute illness. She left behind her first foal, a 2012 colt by Giant's Causeway. She was in foal to Elusive Quality at the time of her death.
