= Sun Goddess (horse) =

Irish racehorse

- Breed: Thoroughbred
- Sire: Sioux Nation
- Grandsire: Scat Daddy
- Dam: Etoile Bleu
- Damsire: Starspangledbanner
- Sex: Filly
- Foaled: March 31, 2024
- Country: Ireland
- Colour: Bay
- Breeder: Owenstown Bloodstock Ltd
- Owner: Westerberg, Michael Tabor, Derrick Smith, Susan O'Brien
- Trainer: Aidan O'Brien
- Jockey: Ryan Moore
- Record: 9: 7-2-0
- Earnings: $1,814,415

Major wins
- Balanchine Stakes (2026); Phoenix Stakes (2026); Moyglare Stud Stakes (2026); Cheveley Park Stakes (2026); Breeders' Cup Juvenile Fillies Turf (2026)

Sun Goddess (foaled March 31, 2024) is an active Irish-bred thoroughbred racehorse. She is known for winning four Group and Grade I races in 2026 as a two-year-old, including the Breeders' Cup Juvenile Fillies Turf. As of October 2026, she has still never finished below second.

== Racing career ==
=== 2026: two-year-old season ===
Sun Goddess raced nine times as a two-year-old. She made her debut at Naas racecourse on May 9, finishing second. She broke her maiden on May 24 at Curragh Racecourse. After breaking her maiden, she made her first start in group race company. On June 19, she competed in the Group III Albany Stakes at Ascot Racecourse, placing second to Libertango, the 2026 Breeders' Cup Juvenile Turf Sprint winner.

Sun Goddess entered the Group II Balanchine Stakes on June 27. At the Curragh, she came in first, rebounding from her previous loss. After that, she entered her first Group 1 races, the Phoenix Stakes on August 9, winning by 1 1/4 lengths and becoming the first filly to win the race for Aidan O’Brien. After her victory in the Phoenix Stakes, she entered a Weight for Age on August 20 at York Racecourse, where she placed first.

On September 13, she competed in the Moyglare Stud Stakes at the Curragh. She comfortably dominated the race, winning by 6 1/2 lengths, with Green Empress placing second. She entered her second Group I race of September, the Cheveley Park Stakes, on the 23rd at Newmarket Racecourse. She defeated Libertango by a length.

She travelled to the United States to compete in the Breeders' Cup Juvenile Fillies Turf at Keeneland on October 30. She dominated the race and won by three lengths, with Green Empress finishing runner-up to her for the fourth time. Her victory at Keeneland marked her fourth Group or Grade I win.

== Racing statistics ==
Times in the below data refer to the time of the winner, not Sun Goddess' time. This data is sourced from Timeform and Racing Post.

Date	Race name	D(f)	Course	Class	Prize	Odds	Runners	Place	Margin	Winner (Runner-up)	Time	Jockey	Trainer
2026 – two-year-old season
9 May 2026	Maiden	5	Naas	Maiden	€3,058	6/1	7	2nd	nose	Carry the Flag	0:58.45	Jack Cleary	Aiden O'Brien
24 May 2026	Fillies Maiden	6	Curragh	Maiden	€14,725	4/11f	9	1st	5 L	(Green Empress)	1:11.64	Ryan Moore	Aiden O'Brien
19 June 2026	Albany Stakes	6	Ascot	1 (G3)	£26,875	10/11f	25	2nd	1 L	Libertango	1:13.12	Ryan Moore	Aiden O'Brien
27 June 2026	Balanchine Stakes	6	Curragh	1 (G2)	€76,570	2/7f	6	1st	3/4 L	(Green Empress)	1:12.52	Ryan Moore	Aiden O'Brien
9 August 2026	Phoenix Stakes	6	Curragh	1 (G1)	€235,600	5/4f	8	1st	1 1/4 L	(Folsom Blues)	1:09.67	Ryan Moore	Aiden O'Brien
20 August 2026	Harry's Half Million	6	York	2	£293,184	1/1f	20	1st	6 L	(Battle Fever)	1:13.47	Ryan Moore	Aiden O'Brien
13 September 2026	Moyglare Stud Stakes	7	Curragh	1 (G1)	€235,600	4/7f	6	1st	6 1/2 L	(Green Empress)	1:27.68	Ryan Moore	Aiden O'Brien
26 September 2026	Cheveley Park Stakes	6	Newmarket	1 (G1)	£155,953	5/6f	6	1st	1 L	(Libertango)	1:09.08	Ryan Moore	Aiden O'Brien
30 October 2026	Breeders' Cup Juvenile Fillies Turf	8	Keeneland	1 (G1)	$516,033	17/20f	14	1st	3 L	(Green Empress)	1:36.10	Ryan Moore	Aiden O'Brien
