= New Money Honey =

American thoroughbred racehorse

- Breed: Thoroughbred
- Sire: Medaglia D'Oro
- Grandsire: El Prado
- Dam: Weekend Whim
- Damsire: Distorted Humor
- Sex: Mare
- Foaled: May 1, 2014
- Country: USA
- Breeder: WinStar Farm, LLC
- Owner: Five Racing Thoroughbreds Owner
- Trainer: Chad C. Brown
- Jockey: Javier Castellano
- Record: 13:5-3-0
- Earnings: $1,516,857

Major wins
- Breeders' Cup Juvenile Fillies Turf (2016); Wonder Again Stakes (2017)

New Money Honey (foaled May 1, 2014) is a retired American Thoroughbred racehorse and broodmare who was the winner of the 2016 Breeders' Cup Juvenile Fillies Turf.

== Career ==
New Money Honey's first race was on September 5, 2016, at Saratoga, where she came in 2nd. She won her next race, which was her first graded race - the Miss Grillo Stakes on October 2, 2016.

New Money Honey got the biggest win of her career by winning the 2016 Breeders' Cup Juvenile Fillies Turf. New Money Honey then picked up another win on July 8, 2017, at the Belmont Oaks Invitational Stakes.

New Money Honey competed in the Alabama Stakes, the Queen Elizabeth II Challenge Cup Stakes and the American Oaks in 2017, but could not place in the top three in either race.

New Money Honey won the last race of her career on July 21, 2017, at Belmont Park. New Money Honey retired in October 2018, due to her owners not wanting to risk injury. New Money Honey was put in foal to War Front in 2019.

== Pedigree ==
Pedigree of New Money Honey (USA), 2014
Sire Medaglia d'Oro (USA) 1999	El Prado (IRE); 1989	Sadler's Wells	Northern Dancer
Sire Medaglia d'Oro (USA) 1999	El Prado (IRE); 1989	Sadler's Wells	Fairy Bridge
Sire Medaglia d'Oro (USA) 1999	El Prado (IRE); 1989	Lady Capulet	Sir Ivor
Sire Medaglia d'Oro (USA) 1999	El Prado (IRE); 1989	Lady Capulet	Cap and Bells
Sire Medaglia d'Oro (USA) 1999	Cappucino Bay (USA); 1989	Bailjumper	Damascus
Sire Medaglia d'Oro (USA) 1999	Cappucino Bay (USA); 1989	Bailjumper	Court Circuit
Sire Medaglia d'Oro (USA) 1999	Cappucino Bay (USA); 1989	Dubbed In	Silent Screen
Sire Medaglia d'Oro (USA) 1999	Cappucino Bay (USA); 1989	Dubbed In	Society Singer
Dam Weekend Whim (USA) 2006	Distorted Humor (USA); 1993	Forty Niner	Mr. Prospector
Dam Weekend Whim (USA) 2006	Distorted Humor (USA); 1993	Forty Niner	File
Dam Weekend Whim (USA) 2006	Distorted Humor (USA); 1993	Danzigs Beauty	Danzig
Dam Weekend Whim (USA) 2006	Distorted Humor (USA); 1993	Danzigs Beauty	Sweetest Chant
Dam Weekend Whim (USA) 2006	Weekend in Indy (USA); 1995	A.P. Indy	Seattle Slew
Dam Weekend Whim (USA) 2006	Weekend in Indy (USA); 1995	A.P. Indy	Weekend Surprise
Dam Weekend Whim (USA) 2006	Weekend in Indy (USA); 1995	Whow	Spectacular Bid
Dam Weekend Whim (USA) 2006	Weekend in Indy (USA); 1995	Whow	Hooplah
