= Philip G. Johnson (horseman) =

Personal information
- Born: October 9, 1925 Chicago, Illinois, U.S.
- Died: August 6, 2004 (aged 78)
- Occupation: Trainer

Horse racing career
- Sport: Horse racing
- Career wins: 2,315

Major racing wins
- Bernard Baruch Handicap (1968); Fall Highweight Handicap (1968); Everglades Stakes (1970); Lexington Handicap (1970); Hollywood Derby (1973); Lawrence Realization Stakes (1973); Dwyer Stakes (1976); Bold Ruler Handicap (1977); Personal Ensign Handicap (1977); Carter Handicap (1977, 1978); Suburban Handicap (1977); American Derby (1978); Brooklyn Handicap (1978); Queens County Handicap (1979); Saranac Stakes (1979); Pennsylvania Governor's Cup Stakes (1980); Gallant Fox Handicap (1981); Manhattan Handicap (1981); Red Smith Handicap (1981, 1994); Discovery Handicap (1982); Kingston Stakes (1982, 1992); Man o' War Stakes (1982); United Nations Handicap (1982); Coaching Club American Oaks (1983); Diana Handicap (1983); Gazelle Stakes (1983, 1990); Lamplighter Stakes (1983); Violet Handicap (1983, 1985, 1987); Boiling Springs Stakes (1984, 2000); East View Stakes (1984); Lake Placid Stakes (1984); Mount Vernon Stakes (1984); Prioress Stakes (1984); Red Bank Stakes (1984); Beaugay Stakes (1985); Flower Bowl Invitational Stakes (1986, 1993); Long Island Handicap (1986, 1987); Maryland Million Ladies (1986); New York Stakes (1986); Pilgrim Stakes (1986, 2000); Sheepshead Bay Stakes (1986); Bed O' Roses Stakes (1987); Correction Stakes (1987); Shuvee Handicap (1987); Top Flight Handicap (1987, 1999); Alabama Stakes (1988); Monmouth Oaks (1988); Gallorette Handicap (1989); Ladies Handicap (1989); Comely Stakes (1990); Barbara Fritchie Handicap (1991); Jaipur Stakes (1994); Knickerbocker Handicap (1994); Sword Dancer Invitational Handicap (1995); Nassau County Stakes (2000); Pegasus Handicap (2001); Poker Handicap (2002) Breeders' Cup wins: Breeders' Cup Classic (2002)

Honors
- U. S. Racing Hall of Fame (1997)

Significant horses
- Geraldine's Store, Kiri's Clown, Maplejinsky, Quiet Little Table, Volponi

Philip G. Johnson, a native of Chicago, IL, was an American Hall of Fame trainer of Thoroughbred race horses. Johnson bought his first Thoroughbred in 1942 for $75. He trained until close to the time of his death on August 6, 2004.

== History ==
Johnson's first racehorse, Song Master, was purchased at auction for $75. Two years later the horse finally proved himself by winning at Hawthorne Race Course. This win was Johnson's first in a long career that lasted 60 years.

During the early years of his career as a trainer Johnson worked in Arlington Park near Chicago, and the Detroit Fair Grounds in Michigan. He also trained in Florida and Maryland, but eventually made his way to what became his permanent home in New York. He won four training titles at Belmont, three titles at Aqueduct, and one at Saratoga.

For 36 straight years, from 1962 until 2003, Johnson won at least one race at Saratoga. Among his many winning horses were several stakes winners, including Geraldine's Store, who won the Diana Handicap in 1983; Kiri's Clown, winner of the Sword Dancer Invitational in 1995; and Maplejinsky, who came in first in the 1998 Alabama Stakes. Johnson was also the trainer of Quiet Little Table who beat Forego in a surprise win in the Suburban Handicap of 1977.

== Volponi ==
In the summer of 2000 Johnson began to train Volponi, a horse that he had bred himself and owned a 50 percent stake in with partner Edward Baier. Volponi won his first stakes race, the Grade 3 Pilgrim Stakes, in 2000. In 2001 he was the winner in the Pegasus Handicap, a Grade 2 stakes race. He also won one more Grade 3 stakes race in 2002, the Poker Handicap. Volponi eventually won the prestigious $4 million Breeders' Cup Classic back on Johnson's native turf of Arlington Park, on October 26, 2002. The win was a shocking upset, memorable not only due to the long odds of 43–1, but also due to the record 6 ½ lengths Voloponi won by. Volponi continued to do well for Johnson throughout 2003, coming in second in five of the seven races he ran that year.

== Career statistics ==
Starts	Wins	Seconds	Thirds	Earnings	Average Earnings/Start
14,066	2,315	1,784	1,829	$47,519,937	$3,378

== Stable ==
In 2002 Johnson was training 38 horses in his stable, which was based throughout the winter in New York.

== Career honors ==
In 1997 Philip Johnson was inducted into the Horse Racing Hall of Fame.

== Last race ==
On July 9, 2004, Johnson entered Angela's Angel in a Maiden Special Weight turf race at Belmont Park in New York. The horse came in tenth place. One month later, on August 6, 2004, Johnson died.
