= Howard M. Tesher =

American horse trainer

Personal information
- Born: 1932 Miami, Florida, U.S.
- Died: January 20, 2023 (aged 90) Miami, Florida, U.S.
- Occupation: Trainer

Horse racing career
- Sport: Horse racing
- Career wins: 1,292

Major racing wins
- Arlington-Washington Futurity Stakes (1971); Round Table Handicap (1974); Lexington Handicap (1974); Eatontown Handicap (1975); Henry P. Russell Handicap (1975); Carter Handicap (1978); Hill Prince Stakes (1978, 1996); Westchester Handicap (1978); Beaugay Handicap (1979, 1981); Sword Dancer Invitational Handicap (1979); Stymie Handicap (1979); Affectionately Handicap (1980, 1981); Belmont Futurity Stakes (1980); Hopeful Stakes (1980); Ladies Handicap (1980); Molly Pitcher Stakes (1980, 1981); Sanford Stakes (1980); Chula Vista Handicap (1981); Hawthorne Handicap (1981, 1982); Milady Handicap (1981); Next Move Handicap (1981, 1982); Paumonok Handicap (1981); Senator Ken Maddy Handicap (1981); Toboggan Handicap (1981); American Derby (1982); Arlington Classic (1982); Beldame Stakes (1982); Comely Stakes (1982); Peter Pan Stakes (1982); Top Flight Handicap (1982); Vagrancy Handicap (1982); Hollie Hughes Handicap (1983, 1997); Miss Grillo Stakes (1983); Astoria Stakes (1984); Pilgrim Stakes (1984); Senorita Stakes (1984); Niagara Handicap (1985); Elkhorn Stakes (1986); Gulfstream Park Turf Handicap (1986, 1987); Hialeah Turf Cup Handicap (1986); Washington, D.C. International Stakes (1986); Damon Runyon Stakes (1989); Nashua Stakes (1989); Tampa Bay Derby (1990); Cliff Hanger Stakes (1993); Florida Derby (1993); Count Fleet Stakes (1994); Gallant Bloom Handicap (1994); Ashley T. Cole Handicap (1995); Dearly Precious Stakes (1995); Ruthless Stakes (1995); Bunty Lawless Stakes (1996); Bowling Green Handicap (1997); Fort Marcy Handicap (1997); Gravesend Handicap (1997); Maker's Mark Mile Stakes (1997); Man o' War Stakes (1997); Sport Page Handicap (1997); United Nations Stakes (1997); Interborough Handicap (1998); Turnback The Alarm Handicap (2001); Kings Point Handicap (2002)

Significant horses
- Bull in the Heather, Gato Del Sol, Influent, Lieutenant's Lark, Plankton, Tap Shoes, Wolfie's Rascal

Howard M. Tesher (1932 – January 20, 2023) was an American Thoroughbred horse racing trainer. A journalism graduate from the University of Florida, he began his career training Thoroughbreds in 1961. Among his numerous important wins, Tesher won the 1986 Washington, D.C. International Stakes at Laurel Park Racecourse with a 37:1 long shot, Lieutenant's Lark.
