= Breeders' Cup Juvenile Fillies Turf =

American Thoroughbred horse race

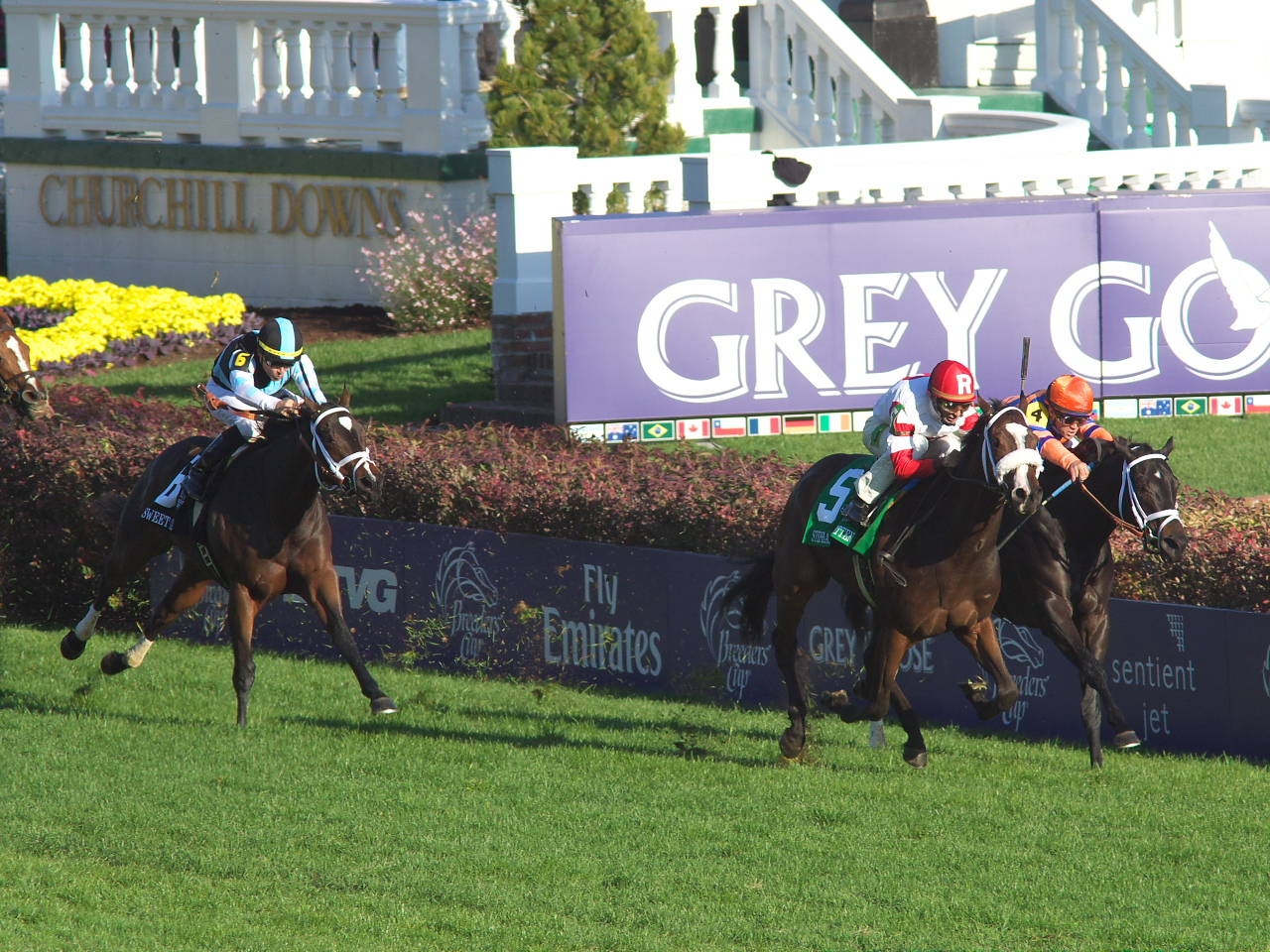
- The 2011 Breeders' Cup Juvenile Fillies Turf
- Class: Grade I
- Location: United States
- Inaugurated: 2008
- Race type: Thoroughbred – Flat racing

Race information
- Distance: 1 mile (8.0 furlongs)
- Surface: Turf
- Track: Left-handed
- Qualification: Two-Year-Old Fillies
- Weight: Assigned
- Purse: $1,000,000

The Breeders' Cup Juvenile Fillies Turf is a one-mile turf stakes race for thoroughbred fillies two years old. As its name implies, it is part of the Breeders' Cup World Championships, the de facto year-end championship for North American thoroughbred racing.

The race was run for the first time in 2008 during the first day of Breeders' Cup racing at that year's host track, Santa Anita Park. Because of technical requirements, it was not eligible for classification as a graded stakes race in its first two runnings. The American Graded Stakes Committee made it a Grade II race in 2010. Effective with the 2012 edition, it became a Grade I race.

== Automatic berths ==
Beginning in 2007, the Breeders' Cup developed the Breeders' Cup Challenge, a series of races in each division that allotted automatic qualifying bids to winners of defined races. Each of the fourteen divisions has multiple qualifying races. Note though that one horse may win multiple challenge races, while other challenge winners will not be entered in the Breeders' Cup for a variety of reasons such as injury or travel considerations.

In the Juvenile Fillies Turf division, runners are limited to 14 and there are up to six automatic berths. The 2022 "Win and You're In" races were:

1. Moyglare Stud Stakes, a Group 1 race run in September at Curragh Racecourse in County Kildare, Ireland
2. Natalma Stakes, a Grade 1 race run in September at Woodbine Racetrack in Toronto, Ontario, Canada
3. Rockfel Stakes, a Group 2 race run in September at Newmarket Racecourse in Suffolk, England
4. Miss Grillo Stakes, a Grade 2 race run in October at Aqueduct Racetrack in New York
5. Prix Marcel Boussac, a Group 1 race run in October at Longchamp Racecourse in Paris, France
6. Jessamine Stakes, a Grade 2 race run in October at Keeneland Racecourse in Kentucky

== Records ==
Most wins by a jockey:

- 3 - Ryan Moore (2022, 2024, 2026)

Most wins by a trainer:

- 6 – Chad C. Brown (2008, 2014, 2016, 2017, 2018, 2023)

Most wins by an owner:

- 2 – e Five Racing Thoroughbreds (2016, 2017)
- 2 – Bobby Flay (2010, 2021)
- 2 - Michael Tabor, Mrs. John Magnier & Derrick Smith (2022, 2024)

== Winners ==
Year	Winner	Jockey	Trainer	Owner	Time	Purse	Grade
2026	Sun Goddess (IRE)	Ryan Moore	Aidan O'Brien	Westerberg, Mrs. John Magnier, Michael Tabor, Derrick Smith	1:36.10	$1,000,000	I
2025	Balantina (IRE)	Oisin Murphy	Donnacha O'Brien	Medallion Racing, Parkland Thoroughbreds, Reeves Thoroughbred Racing, Lissa Ann McNulty	1:35.07	$1,000,000	I
2024	Lake Victoria (IRE)	Ryan Moore	Aidan O'Brien	Michael Tabor, Mrs. John Magnier & Derrick Smith	1:34.28	$1,000,000	I
2023	Hard To Justify	Flavien Prat	Chad C. Brown	Wise Racing	1:34.42	$1,000,000	I
2022	Meditate (IRE)	Ryan Moore	Aidan O'Brien	Mrs. John Magnier, Michael Tabor, Derrick Smith & Westerburg	1:35.38	$1,000,000	I
2021	Pizza Bianca	José L. Ortiz	Christophe Clement	Bobby Flay	1:35.36	$1,000,000	I
2020	Aunt Pearl (IRE)	Florent Geroux	Brad H. Cox	Michael Dubb, Madaket Stables, Peter Deutsch, Michael E. Kisber, The Elkstone Group & Bethlehem Stables	1:35.71	$1,000,000	I
2019	Sharing	Manuel Franco	H. Graham Motion	Eclipse Thoroughbred Partners & Gainesway Stable	1:34.59	$1,000,000	I
2018	Newspaperofrecord (IRE)	Irad Ortiz Jr.	Chad C. Brown	Klaravich Stables	1:39.00	$1,000,000	I
2017	Rushing Fall	Javier Castellano	Chad C. Brown	e Five Racing Thoroughbreds	1:36.09	$1,000,000	I
2016	New Money Honey	Javier Castellano	Chad C. Brown	e Five Racing Thoroughbreds	1:34.01	$1,000,000	I
2015	Catch A Glimpse	Florent Geroux	Mark Casse	Gary Barber, Michael James Ambler & Windways Farm	1:39.08	$1,000,000	I
2014	Lady Eli	Irad Ortiz Jr.	Chad C. Brown	Sheep Pond Partners	1:33.41	$1,000,000	I
2013	Chriselliam (IRE)	Richard Hughes	Charles Hills	Willie Carson, Emily Asprey, Chris Wright	1:33.72	$1,000,000	I
2012	Flotilla (FRA)	Christophe Lemaire	Mikel Delzangles	Sheikh Mohammed Al Thani	1:34.64	$1,000,000	I
2011	Stephanie's Kitten	John Velazquez	Wayne Catalano	Kenneth Ramsey & Sarah Ramsey	1:38.90	$1,000,000	II
2010	More Than Real	Garrett K. Gomez	Todd A. Pletcher	Bobby Flay	1:36.61	$1,000,000	II
2009	Tapitsfly	Robby Albarado	Dale L. Romans	Frank L. Jones Jr.	1:34.25	$1,000,000	
2008	Maram	Jose Lezcano	Chad C. Brown	Karen N. Woods & Saud bin Khaled	1:35.15	$1,000,000	

== See also ==
- Breeders' Cup Juvenile Fillies Turf "top three finishers" and starters
- Breeders' Cup World Thoroughbred Championships
- American thoroughbred racing top attended events
