= James J. Toner =

American racehorse trainer

Jimmy Toner
Personal information
- Born: July 7, 1940 (age 86) Philadelphia, Pennsylvania, U.S.
- Occupation: Trainer

Horse racing career
- Sport: Horse racing
- Career wins: 801+ (ongoing)

Major racing wins
- Great American Stakes (1974); Spinaway Stakes (1983); Schuylerville Stakes (1985); Queen Elizabeth II Challenge Cup Stakes (1993, 1996, 2016); NYRA Mile (1995); Pegasus Handicap (1995); Lake Placid Handicap (1996, 2002, 2016); Ballston Spa Handicap (1998); Diana Handicap (1998, 2004); Great American Stakes (1999); Sheepshead Bay Stakes (2001); Garden City Stakes (2002, 2011); Hillsborough Stakes (2004); Dance Smartly Stakes (2007); Hawthorne Derby ( 2007); Colonial Turf Cup (2008); Gulfstream Park Handicap (2008); Washington, D.C. International Stakes (2008); Poker Stakes (2009); Hollywood Turf Cup Stakes (2017); Breeders' Cup wins: Breeders' Cup Filly & Mare Turf (1999)

Significant horses
- Soaring Softly, Memories of Silver, Winter Memories

James J. "Jimmy" Toner (born July 7, 1940, in Philadelphia, Pennsylvania) is an American Thoroughbred racehorse trainer.

At age nineteen in April 1960 he got his first win as a trainer, making him the youngest to ever win a Thoroughbred horse race in State of New York. He won the 1999 Breeders' Cup Filly & Mare Turf with Soaring Softly and would be named that year's American Champion Female Turf Horse.
