= Christophe Clement =

French-born American Thoroughbred horse trainer (1965–2025)

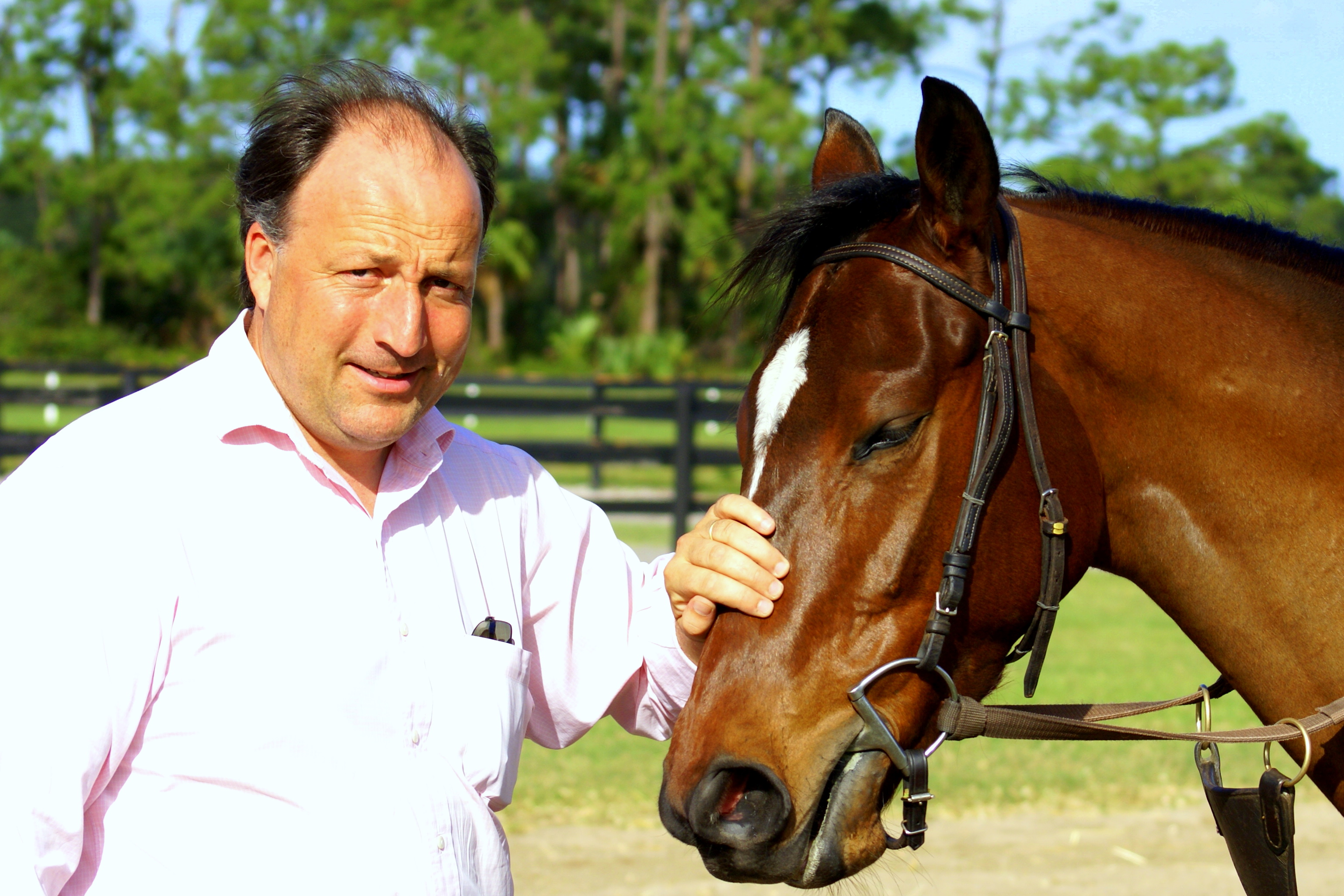
- Clement in 2007

Personal information
- Born: November 1, 1965 Paris, France
- Died: May 25, 2025 (aged 59)
- Occupation: Thoroughbred Horse Trainer

Horse racing career
- Sport: Horse racing
- Career wins: 2,576

Major racing wins
- Breeders' Cup Juvenile Fillies Turf (2021); Sword Dancer Stakes (1999, 2011, 2021, 2022, 2024); Belmont Derby (2020); Saratoga Derby (2024); Frizette Stakes (2016); Jockey Club Gold Cup (2014, 2015); Gamely (2015); Cigar Mile Handicap (2015); Belmont Stakes (2014); Del Mar Oaks (2007, 2013); Shadwell Turf Mile (2010, 2011); Manhattan (2001, 2009, 2010); Man o' War Stakes (2009, 2010); Turf Classic (2010, 2024); Frank E. Kilroe Mile Handicap (2009); Belmont Oaks (2001, 2009); Coaching Club American Oaks (2009); Arlington Million (2009); Beverly D. Stakes (2001, 2007, 2008); Bing Crosby Handicap (2007); Diana Handicap (1997, 2003, 2015); Queen Elizabeth II Challenge Cup Stakes (1994); E.P. Taylor Stakes (2021); Summer Stakes (2019, 2023); Canadian International Stakes (2005)

Honours
- Christophe Clement Stakes; Christophe Clement Turf Stakes; U.S. Racing Hall of Fame (2026)
- Updated on 24 April 2026

Christophe Clement (November 1, 1965 – May 24, 2025) was an American Thoroughbred horse trainer, who won the 2014 Belmont Stakes with Tonalist.

== Racing background ==
Clement initially acquired his training skills from his father, Miguel, a leading trainer in France. Clement later worked for the prominent French racing family of trainer Alec Head. In the United States, Clement studied under Hall of Fame conditioner Shug McGaughey before returning to Europe to work as assistant to trainer Luca Cumani in Newmarket, England.

== Racing career ==
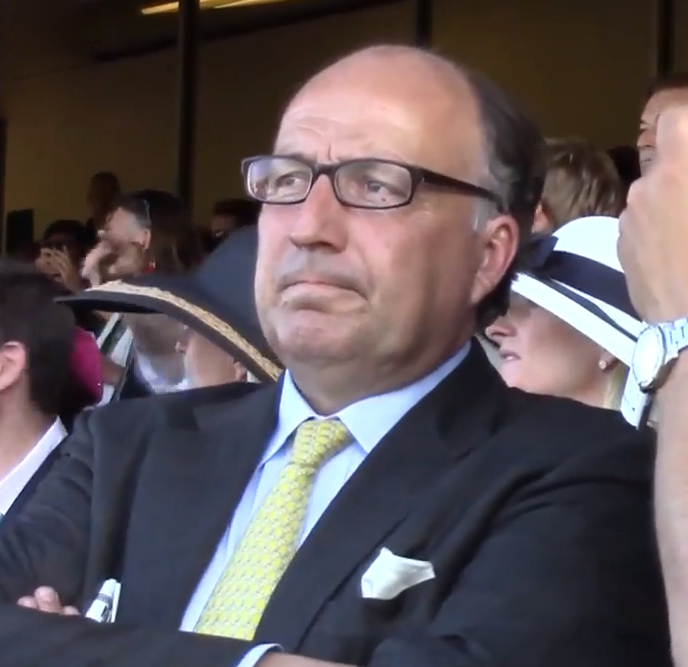
Christophe Clement in the stands watching Tonalist in the 2014 Belmont Stakes

Clement's first winner was the first horse he saddled, Spectaculaire, at Belmont Park in 1991. He succeeded in graded stakes around the U.S., including wins with Trampoli, Voodoo Dancer, Blu Tusmani, Relaxed Gesture, Flag Down, Statesmanship, Coretta, Honor Glide, Dedication, Dynever, Forbidden Apple, and England's Legend who won the Beverly D. Stakes in 2001. In 2007 he had a repeat win in the Beverly D. with Royal Highness, as well as winning stakes with Meribel, Gio Ponti, Revved Up, Naissance Royale, Vacare, In Summation, and Rutherienne. Rutherienne won six stakes, among them five graded victories. Gio Ponti won Eclipse Awards in 2010 and 2011. In 2014, Clement won the Belmont Stakes and twice the Jockey Club Gold Cup with Tonalist. In 2021, he won the Breeders' Cup at Del Mar with Pizza Bianca.

Christophe Clement Racing Stable has yielded more than $180 million in purses in 2025, over 250 graded stakes wins, over 530 all black type races, and over 2,500 wins. Clement celebrated his 1,000th win in December 2008 and his 2,000th in 2020.

In 2026, Clement was posthumously elected into the National Museum of Racing and Hall of Fame.

== Personal life and death ==
Clement was married to Valerie, with whom he had a son, Miguel (married to Acacia Clement), and a daughter, Charlotte (married to Shaun Collins) and a grandson named Hugo. He died of uveal melanoma on May 24, 2025, at the age of 59. Miguel Clement continues to run Clement Stable.
