= Robbie Davis =

American jockey (born 1961)

Personal information
- Born: July 18, 1961 (age 65) Pocatello, Idaho, U.S.
- Occupation: Jockey

Horse racing career
- Sport: Horse racing
- Career wins: 3,382

Major racing wins
- Mount Vernon Stakes (1983, 1992); Bed O' Roses Handicap (1984, 1987, 1994); Remsen Stakes (1984, 2000); Meadowlands Cup (1985); Saranac Stakes (1985); Affectionately Handicap (1985); Ladies Handicap (1985, 1987); Santa Ana Handicap (1986); Orchid Handicap (1986); Washington, D.C. International Stakes (1986); Fall Highweight Handicap (1986); Beaugay Handicap (1987, 1995); Revidere Handicap (1987); Honorable Miss Stakes (1987); Tremont Stakes (1987); Acorn Stakes (1988); Hopeful Stakes (1988, 1998); Beverly D. Stakes (1990); Los Angeles Handicap (1990); Round Table Stakes (1991); Oceanport Handicap (1992, 1994); Brooklyn Handicap (1993); Ruffian Handicap (1993); Pimlico Special (1994); Bed O' Roses Breeders' Cup Handicap (1994); Canadian International Stakes (1994); Belmont Futurity Stakes (1995); Cigar Mile Handicap (1995); Champagne Stakes (1995); New York Breeders' Futurity (1995); Sanford Stakes (1995); Vosburgh Stakes (1995); Arlington Million (1996); Queen Elizabeth II Challenge Cup Stakes (1996); True North Handicap (1996, 1997, 2000); Manhattan Handicap (1997); Jockey Club Gold Cup (1998); Wood Memorial Stakes (1998); United Nations Stakes (2000, 2001); Northern Dancer Breeders' Cup Turf (2001)

Racing awards
- Mike Venezia Memorial Award (1997)

Significant horses
- Videogenic, Lieutenant's Lark, Raintrap, Mecke, Coronado's Quest

Robbie Glen Davis (born July 18, 1961, in Pocatello, Idaho) is a retired American Thoroughbred horse racing jockey.

== Early life ==
Davis grew up in a single parent household forced onto welfare, something that would impact him for the rest of his life. At age 14 Robbie got his first job at Buddy's Pizza in Pocatello, Idaho, working as a dish washer and busboy.

Robbie Davis began his involvement with horse racing as a stable boy, cleaning horse stalls at a racetrack in his native Idaho and by age 17 was riding in quarter horse races at county fairs.

In 1997, he was honored by Big Brothers/Big Sisters of Long Island for his support of that organization.

== Career ==
In 1981 he switched to Thoroughbred flat racing and in 1982 moved to compete at New York area tracks. He earned his first Grade I victory in the 1985 Meadowlands Cup on board Bounding Basque.

During his career, Davis won a number of premier races including the 1986 Washington, D.C. International Stakes, the 1994 Pimlico Special and Canadian International Stakes, as well as the 1998 Wood Memorial Stakes. His best result in two Kentucky Derby starts was a fifth with Mecke in 1995 with whom he also finished fifth in the Preakness Stakes. Of his five mounts in the Belmont Stakes, Davis's best finish came aboard Kingpost in the 1988 running won by Risen Star.

On October 13, 1988, Robbie Davis was involved in a racing accident at Belmont Park in Elmont, New York that claimed the life of friend and fellow jockey, Mike Venezia. Venezia's horse, Mr. Walter K., broke his right front leg on the backstretch; as the horse fell, Venezia jumped and rolled under the hooves of Davis' mount Drums in the Night. Venezia died instantly. The trauma resulted in Davis leaving racing for several years. After returning briefly on a few occasions, he came back full-time in 1992. Five years later, he was voted the Mike Venezia Memorial Award which honor a jockey who exemplifies extraordinary sportsmanship and citizenship.

== Retirement ==
Retired in 2002, Davis served as a Director at large for the Jockeys' Guild. In 2006, he was nominated for induction in the U.S. Racing Hall of Fame.

A classic car collector, he and his wife own an 80-acre (32 ha) farm in upstate New York, not far from the Saratoga Race Course. Parents of six children, their daughter Jacqueline was one of eleven students in the inaugural class at the North American Racing Academy in Versailles, Kentucky, founded as a jockey training program through the auspices of the Kentucky Community Technical College System. Jackie Davis won her first career race on November 5, 2008, aboard 64-1 shot Blue Hill Bay at Aqueduct; she has won six races as of March 2009. Her father serves as her agent. His son, Dylan, and daughters, Katie and Jacqueline, have followed in their father and sister's footsteps.

== Return to the saddle ==
On October 1, 2011, Davis returned to the saddle, riding Sandyinthesun, a horse he also trains, to a sixth-place finish in the 11th race at Belmont Park.

=== Year-end charts ===
Chart (2000–2002)	Peak position
National Earnings List for Jockeys 2000	39
National Earnings List for Jockeys 2001	48
National Earnings List for Jockeys 2002	94
