= Mrs. Revere Stakes =

- Class: Grade II
- Location: Churchill Downs; Louisville, Kentucky, United States
- Inaugurated: 1991
- Race type: Thoroughbred – Flat racing
- Website: Churchill Downs

Race information
- Distance: 1 1/16 miles
- Surface: Turf
- Track: Left-handed
- Qualification: Three-year-old fillies
- Weight: 122 lbs. with allowances
- Purse: $300,000 (2024)

The Mrs. Revere Stakes is a Grade II American Thoroughbred horse race for three-year-old fillies run over a distance of 1 1/16 miles on turf held annually in November at Churchill Downs in Louisville, Kentucky during the fall meeting. Currently offers a purse of $300,000.

== History ==
The Mrs. Revere Stakes is named in honor of the filly, Mrs. Revere born in 1981. Mrs. Revere won four Churchill Downs stakes during 1984-85 including the Regret Stakes, Edgewood Stakes and Dogwood Stakes as a three-year-old and the Kentucky Cardinal Handicap as a four-year-old.

The event was inaugurated on 16 November 1991 at was won by the 4/5 odds-on William S. Farish III & Edward J. Hudson Jr. owned filly Spanish Parade who was ridden by US Hall of Fame jockey Pat Day with a last to first sweep in a time of 1:46.19.

The American Graded Stakes Committee classified the event as Grade III in 1995 and three years later, in 1998 was upgraded to Grade II.

In 2023 the event was moved off the turf and subsequently was downgraded to Grade III.

== Records ==
Speed record:

- 1 1/16 miles: 1:41.73 – Mary's Follies (2009)

Margins:

- 7 lengths – Weekend Madness (IRE) (1993)

Most wins by a jockey:

- 4 – Julien R. Leparoux (2008, 2011, 2012, 2014)

Most wins by a trainer:

- 2 – Neil J. Howard (1991, 1997)
- 2 – Thomas J. Skiffington (1994, 1996)
- 2 – Todd A. Pletcher (2004, 2015)
- 2 – Brad H. Cox (2022, 2023)
- 2 – Wesley A. Ward (2013, 2024)

Most wins by an owner:

- 2 – William S. Farish III & Edward J. Hudson Jr. (1991, 1997)
- 2 – Kenneth and Sarah Ramsey (2006, 2013)

== Winners ==
Year	Winner	Jockey	Trainer	Owner	Distance	Time	Purse	Grade	Ref
2025	Lush Lips (GB)	Tyler Gaffalione	Brendan P. Walsh	Dixiana Farms	1 1/16 miles	1:41.75	$269,800	II	
2024	Kehoe Beach	Frankie Dettori	Wesley A. Ward	Thomas W. Bachman	1 1/16 miles	1:42.45	$292,335	II	
2023	Heavenly Sunday	Florent Geroux	Brad H. Cox	Miacomet Farm	1 1/16 miles	1:44.69	$298,250	III	Off turf
2022	Bubble Rock	Joel Rosario	Brad H. Cox	Shortleaf Stable Inc.	1 1/16 miles	1:45.05	$300,000	II	
2021	Race Not Run								
2020	Princess Grace	Florent Geroux	Michael Stidham	Susan & John Moore	1 1/16 miles	1:44.00	$200,000	II	Off turf
2019	Nay Lady Nay (IRE)	Junior Alvarado	Chad C. Brown	First Row Partners & Hidden Brook Farm	1 1/16 miles	1:48.52	$300,000	II	
2018	Princess Warrior	Brian Hernandez Jr.	Kenneth G. McPeek	Evan Trommer, Matthew Trommer & Andrew Trommer	1 1/16 miles	1:47.61	$200,000	II	
2017	Lovely Bernadette	Florent Geroux	James P. DiVito	James M. Miller	1 1/16 miles	1:47.02	$200,000	II	
2016	Linda	Brian Hernandez Jr.	Ian R. Wilkes	Whitham Thoroughbreds	1 1/16 miles	1:44.63	$200,000	II	
2015	Isabella Sings	Paco Lopez	Todd A. Pletcher	Siena Farm	1 1/16 miles	1:44.74	$200,000	II	
2014	Sparkling Review	Julien R. Leparoux	Ben Colebrook	Edward A. Seltzer & Beverly S. Anderson	1 1/16 miles	1:42.33	$237,800	II	
2013	Emotional Kitten	Victor Espinoza	Wesley A. Ward	Kenneth and Sarah Ramsey	1 1/16 miles	1:44.53	$205,100	II	
2012	Centre Court	Julien R. Leparoux	George R. Arnold II	G. Watts Humphrey Jr.	1 1/16 miles	1:42.54	$202,125	II	
2011	Marketing Mix	Julien R. Leparoux	Thomas F. Proctor	Glen Hill Farm	1 1/16 miles	1:42.59	$200,550	II	
2010	Aruna	Ramon A. Dominguez	H. Graham Motion	Flaxman Holdings	1 1/16 miles	1:46.02	$199,675	II	
2009	Mary's Follies	Kent J. Desormeaux	Richard E. Dutrow Jr.	Paul P. Pompa Jr.	1 1/16 miles	1:41.73	$206,500	II	
2008	Acoma	Julien R. Leparoux	David M. Carroll	Helen C. Alexander & Helen K. Groves	1 1/16 miles	1:43.52	$201,950	II	
2007	Bit of Whimsy	Javier Castellano	Barclay Tagg	Joyce B. Young & Gerald McManis	1 1/16 miles	1:43.16	$174,900	II	
2006	Precious Kitten	Rafael Bejarano	Robert J. Frankel	Kenneth and Sarah Ramsey	1 1/16 miles	1:45.65	$170,550	II	
2005	My Typhoon (IRE)	Robby Albarado	William I. Mott	Live Oak Plantation	1 1/16 miles	1:43.36	$166,950	II	
2004	River Belle (GB)	Kieren Fallon	Todd A. Pletcher	Team Valor International, Heiligbrodt Racing Stable & Green Lantern Stables	1 1/16 miles	1:44.59	$171,150	II	
2003	Hoh Buzzard (IRE)	Ryan Fogelsonger	Ben D. A. Cecil	Gary A. Tanaka	1 1/16 miles	1:45.01	$175,650	II	
2002	Caught in the Rain	Edwin L. King Jr.	Guadalupe Preciado	Ronald Perozzi	1 1/16 miles	1:46.25	$173,700	II	
2001	Snow Dance	Craig Perret	John T. Ward Jr.	John C. Oxley	1 1/16 miles	1:42.86	$172,500	II	
2000	Megans Bluff	Mark Guidry	John K. Hennig	James C. Routsong	1 1/16 miles	1:43.37	$174,150	II	
1999	Silver Comic	Larry Melancon	W. Elliott Walden	Brereton C. Jones	1 1/16 miles	1:45.13	$174,750	II	
1998	Anguilla	Pat Day	Thomas J. Skiffington	John G. & Glenn Sikura	1 1/16 miles	1:45.67	$173,550	II	
1997	Parade Queen	Pat Day	Neil J. Howard	William S. Farish III & Edward J. Hudson Jr.	1 1/16 miles	1:45.46	$175,200	III	
1996	Maxzene	Julie Krone	Thomas J. Skiffington	Ken Mort Stables	1 1/16 miles	1:43.78	$116,700	III	
1995	Petrouchka	Dave Penna	Phillip England	Knob Hill Stables	1 1/16 miles	1:44.20	$116,500	III	
1994	Mariah's Storm	Robert Neal Lester	Don Von Hemel	Thunderhead Farms	1 1/16 miles	1:43.99	$116,000	Listed	
1993	Weekend Madness (IRE)	Charles R. Woods Jr.	Burk Kessinger Jr.	New Phoenix Stable	1 1/16 miles	1:46.32	$114,900	Listed	
1992	McKaymackenna	Jorge Velasquez	Rene A. Araya	R Kay Stables	1 1/16 miles	1:45.04	$86,475	Listed	
1991	Spanish Parade	Pat Day	Neil J. Howard	William S. Farish III & Edward J. Hudson Jr.	1 1/16 miles	1:46.19	$57,550	Listed	

Legend:
Turf Dirt

== See also ==
- List of American and Canadian Graded races
