= Wait A While =

American-bred Thoroughbred racehorse

- Sire: Maria's Mon
- Grandsire: Wavering Monarch
- Dam: Flirtatious
- Damsire: A.P. Indy
- Sex: Mare
- Foaled: March 4, 2003
- Country: United States
- Colour: Gray
- Breeder: William S. Farish III & W. Temple Webber Jr.
- Owner: Arindel Farm (Alan & Karen Cohen)
- Trainer: Todd Pletcher
- Record: 24: 12-3-4
- Earnings: $2,181,917

Major wins
- Miss Grillo Stakes (2005); Davona Dale Stakes (2006); Sands Point Stakes (2006); American Oaks (2006); Lake Placid Stakes (2006); Yellow Ribbon Stakes (2006, 2008); Honey Fox Stakes (2007); Ballston Spa Handicap (2007, 2008); San Gorgonio Handicap (2008)

Awards
- American Champion Three-Year-Old Filly (2006)

Wait A While (foaled March 4, 2003) is an American Thoroughbred racehorse and broodmare. Although she showed some good form on dirt she had her greatest success on turf and won twelve of her twenty-four races in a track career which lasted from August 2005 until October 2008. As a two-year-old she won two of her four races including the Miss Grillo Stakes. In the following year she won the Davona Dale Stakes, Sands Point Stakes, American Oaks, Lake Placid Stakes and Yellow Ribbon Stakes in a campaign which saw her being voted that season's American Champion Three-Year-Old Filly. Her third season was disrupted by illness and injury but she did win the Honey Fox Stakes and the Ballston Spa Handicap. In her final season Wait A While won the San Gorgonio Handicap and recorded repeat victories in the Ballston Spa Handicap and the Yellow Ribbon Stakes. Her racing career ended controversially when she was disqualified for failing a drug test after finishing third in the Breeders' Cup Filly & Mare Turf.

== Background ==
Wait A While is a gray mare bred in Kentucky by William Stamps Farish III & W. Temple Webber Jr. She was sired by the 1995 American Champion Two-Year-Old Colt Maria's Mon, whose other progeny included the Kentucky Derby winners Monarchos and Super Saver. Wait A While was the first of four recorded foals produced by her dam Flirtatious, who won four minor races from twelve stats. Flirtatious's dam Grand Charmer was a half-sister of the dam of the Preakness Stakes winner Lookin At Lucky, and a more distant relative of the Irish Derby winner Sir Harry Lewis.

In September 2004 the yearling filly was consigned by Lane's End to the Keeneland sale and was bought for $50,000 by Tim Hamm. In February 2005, she returned to the sales ring at Ocala, Florida and was sold for $260,000 to Ocala Horses. She raced in the ownership of Alan & Karen Cohen's Arindel Farm and was sent into training with Todd Pletcher.

== Racing career ==
=== 2005: two-year-old season ===
On her track debut, Wait A While finished fifth in a maiden race over six furlongs on dirt at Saratoga Race Course on August 29, 2005. A month later she was switched to the turf surface at Belmont Park and won a one-mile maiden, taking the lead on the final turn and drawing away in the closing stages to win by five lengths under a ride from John Velazquez. On the dirt at Belmont on October 23 she started the 1.6/1 favorite for the nine furlong Miss Grillo Stakes in which she was ridden as on her debut by Jerry Bailey. She took the lead from the start and was never challenged, winning by six and a half lengths from Swap Fliparoo. The filly was then moved up in class for the Grade II Demoiselle Stakes over nine furlongs at Aqueduct Racetrack in November. After showing some reluctance to enter the starting gate she set a "dawdling" for three-quarters of a mile before tiring to finish third behind Wonder Lady Anne L and Cinderella's Dream.

=== 2006: three-year-old season ===
Wait A While began her championship season with two races at Gulfstream Park, in both of which she was ridden by Velazquez. On February 4, racing on a sloppy track she won the Grade II Davona Dale Stakes by fourteen lengths from Teammate with Wonder Lady Anne L in third. She had delayed the start of the race for several minutes as she refused to enter the gate. After the race Pletcher admitted that while he believed the filly was better suited by grass, he felt obliged to follow the Kentucky Oaks trail. In March she started favorite for the Bonnie Miss Stakes but after racing in second for most of the nine furlong distance she faded in the closing stages to finish third behind Teammate and Wonder Lady Anne L. She was then moved up to Grade I class for the Ashland Stakes (a major trial for the Kentucky Oaks) at Keeneland on April 8. She was once again reluctant to enter the starting gate even after Velazquez dismounted, before finishing second, six and a half lengths behind the winner Bushfire. Garrett Gomez, who became the filly's regular jockey, took over the ride when Wait A While (after completing a series of starting gate tests) contested the 132nd running of the Kentucky Oaks at Churchill Downs on May 5 and started the 8.3/1 fourth choice in the betting behind Balance, Bushfire and Wonder Lady Anne L. She finished fourth of the fourteen runners behind the 47/1 outsider Lemons Forever, Ermine and Bushfire, but was promoted to third after Bushfire was disqualified for causing interference in the closing stages.

Wait A While was dropped in class for the Grade III Sands Point Stakes over nine furlongs at Belmont on June 3 and started the 0.5/1 favorite against three opponents. The race was run on a sloppy dirt track having been transferred from the waterlogged turf course. She led from the start before going clear approaching the straight and won by four and a half lengths from Diamond Spirit. Wait A While returned to Grade I class for the American Oaks on turf at Hollywood Park Racetrack on July 2 and started 2.9/1 third favorite behind the Japanese filly Asahi Rising (third in the Yushun Himba) and the Honeymoon Handicap winner Attima. After racing in fourth place she survived a bump a quarter of a mile from the finish before taking the lead and drawing clear to win by four and a half lengths from Asahi Rising with the Canadian filly Arravale in third. After the race her owner's racing manager Cody Richardson said that the filly would probably stick to turf racing in the immediate future observing "she's obviously a very competitive filly on the dirt as well, but after a performance like this against this caliber of fillies, you'd have to think she'd be here for a while". In the Grade II Lake Placid Stakes on turf at Saratoga on August 18 she started 1.05/1 favorite against four opponents and won for the third time in a row, beating the French-bred Regret Stakes winner Lady of Venice by four and three quarter lengths. Pletcher described her win as "a dominant performance", and added "She is one of those special fillies that can do a little bit of everything. She's actually competitive on dirt, but this is her true calling: on the turf." Gomez commented; "this is a beautiful filly. When I asked her, she just exploded for me".

On September 30, Wait A While was matched against older fillies and mares for the first time in the Grade I Yellow Ribbon Stakes over ten furlongs at Santa Anita Park and started the 0.7/1 favorite against seven opponents including Three Degrees (Honeymoon Handicap), Moscow Burning (Sheepshead Bay Stakes) and Dancing Edie (John C. Mabee Handicap). She tracked the leader Dancing Edie, before taking the lead approaching the stretch and going clear to win by four and a half lengths. Dancing Edie took second place by a neck from Three Degrees. Gomez commented "all I can say is that everything she's done has been impressive...I'm really glad Todd decided to put her on the grass." Wait A While ended her second season by contesting the eighth running of the Breeders' Cup Filly & Mare Turf run that year at Churchill Downs. She started 2.3/1 second favorite behind the British mare Ouija Board who had won the race in 2004. Wait A While raced in fifth place before moving up to third on the final turn but could make no further progress and finished fourth behind Ouija Board, Film Maker and Honey Ryder, being the first three-year-old to finish.

=== 2007: four-year-old season ===
As in the previous year, Wait A While began her third season at Gulfstream. John Velazquez took the ride in the Grade III Honey Fox Stakes in which the filly started 0.4/1 favorite and won by one and a quarter lengths from Precious Kitten after leading from the start. Velazquez said "she was awesome. I gave her one spank and she took off." She was reunited with Gomez and started favorite for the Grade III Jenny Wiley Stakes at Keeneland in April but finished fifth of the six runners behind My Typhoon (to whom she was conceding four pounds), almost seven lengths behind the winner. Wait A While started favorite again for the Just A Game Handicap at Belmont on June 9, but again proved no match for My Typhoon (at level weights), beaten three and three quarter lengths into second place. The filly was sent to contest the CashCall Mile Invitational Stakes but was scratched from the race after developing a fever. Wait A While met My Typhoon for the third time in the Grade II Ballston Spa Handicap at Saratoga on August 23 and started 3/1 second favorite behind her rival, from whom she was receiving one pound. The filly recovered from a bump at the start to settle in fifth place before taking the lead on the outside entering the stretch and winning by two and a quarter lengths from Vacare, with My Typhoon in sixth. After the race Pletcher said "people may have lost some respect for her... things haven’t gone exactly right with her... she showed today that she is as good as she has ever been."

Wait A While started odds-on favorite for the Grade I Flower Bowl Invitational Stakes at Belmont on September 29, but, after racing in second place on the outside for most of the way she faded in the stretch and finished third, beaten three quarters of a length and half a length by Lahudood and Rosinka. Plans to race the filly in the Breeders' Cup Filly & Mare Turf were abandoned after she sustained a knee injury. On her final appearance of the season, Wait A While started 6/5 favorite for the Matriarch Stakes at Hollywood Park on November 25 and finished second to Precious Kitten, with Lady of Venice and Live Life in third and fourth.

=== 2008: five-year-old season ===
On January 14, 2008, at Santa Anita, Wait A While contested the Grade II San Gorgonio Handicap a race which had been postponed for a week as the racecourse struggled with drainage problems caused by the newly installed Cushion Track. Starting the odds-on favorite against four opponents, she raced in third place before taking the lead a quarter of a mile from the finish and winning by one and a half lengths from Lavender Sky. Commenting on the mare's relatively unimpressive performance, Gomez said "She was looking around, and I couldn’t get her focused on her task [but] when I found a spot, she did what she was supposed to do". Wait A While then sustained a stress fracture to her left tibia and was off the course for more than six months.

Wait A While returned for the Grade I Diana Stakes at Saratoga on July 26. Ridden for the first and only time by Rafael Bejarano she was made the 3.05/1 favorite but finished seventh of the ten runners almost six lengths behind the winner Forever Together. On August 21, the mare attempted to repeat her 2007 success in the Ballston Spa Handicap and started the 0.85/1 favorite against four opponents. With John Velazquez reclaiming the ride, Wait A While tracked the leader Sharp Susan before taking the lead entering the stretch and held off the challenge of Carriage Trail to win by a length. Pletcher expressed the view that the firmer ground had been the key to the mare's improved performance and added "She's a special filly... she's won some tremendous races. This is her fourth year at Saratoga, so when you have one that long, it gets a little extra special".

On September 27, Wait A While attempted to become the first horse to win the Yellow Ribbon Stakes for a second time. Ridden by Velaquez she started favorite ahead of the New Zealand-bred Black Mamba (winner of the John C. Mabee Handicap) and Vacare. After racing in third place on the outside, the mare took the lead entering the stretch, accelerated into a clear lead, and held off a challenge from Vacare to win by three-quarters of a length, with Black Mamba a length away in third. Velazquez reported that the mare "got a little bit aggressive with me when we started down the backside, but she does everything easy and I was able to bide my time. When we made the lead turning for home I thought she was going to just open up, but instead she waited on those horses. When Vacare came to her outside, though, she dug in and got it done."

Wait A While ended her career by contesting the tenth running of the Breeders' Cup Filly & Mare Turf run at Santa Anita on October 24 and started 4/1 second favorite behind the three-year-old Irish filly Halfway to Heaven. After racing in third place she moved forward on the outside on the final turn and briefly took the lead inside the final furlong but was overtaken in the final strides and finished third behind Forever Together and the Canadian outsider Sealy Hill. Following the race, Wait A While was disqualified from third place after testing positive for procaine, a local anaesthetic component of "procaine penicillin G" an antibiotic preparation which was administered to the mare to treat a fever she contracted after winning the Yellow Ribbon. Pletcher insisted that the drug had last been administered to the mare eighteen days before the Filly & Mare Turf after he had been assured that it would be clear of her system in fourteen days.

== Assessment and awards ==
In the Eclipse Awards for 2006, Wait A While was named American Champion Three-Year-Old Filly. She received 138 votes with 108 going to the Alabama Stakes winner Pine Island and 21 to other contenders. She finished third to Ouija Board in the voting for American Champion Female Turf Horse

== Breeding record ==
- Zaikov, grey colt, foaled in 2010, sired by Distorted Humor, unbeaten in two races
- Wait No More, grey filly, 2011, by Medaglia d'Oro, won two races (active in 2014)
- Partiro, colt, 2013, by Smart Strike

== Pedigree ==
Pedigree of Wait A While (USA), gray mare, 2003
Sire Maria's Mon (USA) 1993	Wavering Monarch (USA); 1979	Majestic Light	Majestic Prince
Sire Maria's Mon (USA) 1993	Wavering Monarch (USA); 1979	Majestic Light	Irradiate
Sire Maria's Mon (USA) 1993	Wavering Monarch (USA); 1979	Uncommitted	Buckpasser
Sire Maria's Mon (USA) 1993	Wavering Monarch (USA); 1979	Uncommitted	Lady Be Good
Sire Maria's Mon (USA) 1993	Carlotta Maria (USA); 1984	Caro	Fortino
Sire Maria's Mon (USA) 1993	Carlotta Maria (USA); 1984	Caro	Chambord
Sire Maria's Mon (USA) 1993	Carlotta Maria (USA); 1984	Water Malone	Naskra
Sire Maria's Mon (USA) 1993	Carlotta Maria (USA); 1984	Water Malone	Gray Matter
Dam Flirtatious (USA) 1997	A.P. Indy (USA); 1989	Seattle Slew	Bold Reasoning
Dam Flirtatious (USA) 1997	A.P. Indy (USA); 1989	Seattle Slew	My Charmer
Dam Flirtatious (USA) 1997	A.P. Indy (USA); 1989	Weekend Surprise	Secretariat
Dam Flirtatious (USA) 1997	A.P. Indy (USA); 1989	Weekend Surprise	Lassie Dear
Dam Flirtatious (USA) 1997	Grand Charmer (USA); 1992	Lord Avie	Lord Gaylord
Dam Flirtatious (USA) 1997	Grand Charmer (USA); 1992	Lord Avie	Avie
Dam Flirtatious (USA) 1997	Grand Charmer (USA); 1992	Regal Feeling	Clever Trick
Dam Flirtatious (USA) 1997	Grand Charmer (USA); 1992	Regal Feeling	Sharp Belle (Family 9-f)
