= Jessamine Stakes =

- Class: Grade II
- Location: Keeneland Race Course; Lexington, Kentucky, United States
- Inaugurated: 1991 (as Green River Stakes)
- Race type: Thoroughbred - Flat racing
- Sponsor: Keeneland Sales (since 2023)
- Website: Keeneland

Race information
- Distance: 1 1/16 miles
- Surface: Turf
- Track: Left-handed
- Qualification: Two-year-old fillies
- Weight: 122 lbs with allowances
- Purse: $400,000 (2025)
- Bonuses: Win and You're In Breeders' Cup Juvenile Fillies Turf

The Jessamine Stakes is a Grade II American thoroughbred horse race for two-year-old filles over a distance of 1 1/16 miles on the turf held annually in early October at Keeneland Race Course in Lexington, Kentucky during the fall meeting.

== History ==
The event was inaugurated on 22 October 1991 as the Green River Stakes and was won by the second favorite Shes Just Super who was ridden by US Hall of Fame jockey Pat Day in a time of 1:44.91. The name of the event was named after the Green River a tributary of the Ohio River that rises in Lincoln County in south-central Kentucky. The event was created in parallel with the Hopemont Stakes which was run one day later for two-year-olds regardless of sex.

The event was run in two divisions in 1994.

In 2003 the event was renamed to the Jessamine County Stakes – Jessamine County is near Lexington and is considered part of the Lexington-Fayette metropolitan area. In 2005 the event was renamed to the Jessamine Stakes.

In 2009, the race was moved from the turf to the main all weather track due to weather conditions.

The American Graded Stakes Committee made it a Graded stakes race for the first time in 2011 and was upgraded to Grade II status in 2018.

The race is currently part of the Breeders' Cup Challenge series and was sponsored by JP Morgan Chase. The winner automatically qualify for the Breeders' Cup Juvenile Fillies Turf.

== Records ==
Speed record:

- 1:40.86 – Aunt Pearl (IRE) (2020)

Margins

- 5 1/2 lengths – Sweet Melania (2019)

Most wins by an owner

- 3 – William A. Carl (1991, 1997, 2003)
- 3 – Kenneth L. Ramsey (1994, 2000, 2014)

Most wins by a jockey

- 5 – Pat Day (1991, 1996, 1998, 1999, 2001)

Most wins by a trainer

- 4 – Kenneth G. McPeek (1993, 2003, 2009, 2010)
- 4 – Todd A. Pletcher (2002, 2004, 2005, 2019)

== Winners ==
Year	Winner	Jockey	Trainer	Owner	Distance	Time	Purse	Grade	Ref
Jessamine Stakes
2026	Serenas Ghost	Luis Saez	Joe Sharp	Moving Forward Racing	1 1/16 miles	1:45.57	$400,000	II	
2025	Imaginationthelady	Frankie Dettori	Brendan P. Walsh	Mark Dobbin	1 1/16 miles	1:42.61	$398,750	II	
2024	May Day Ready	Frankie Dettori	Joseph Lee	KatieRich Stables	1 1/16 miles	1:44.10	$350,000	II	
2023	Buchu	Martin Garcia	Philip Bauer	Rigney Racing	1 1/16 miles	1:42.48	$350,000	II	
2022	Delight	Luis Saez	Jonathan Thomas	Augustin Stable	1 1/16 miles	1:44.14	$320,463	II	
2021	California Angel	Rafael Bejarano	George Leonard III	Chris Walsh	1 1/16 miles	1:44.30	$200,000	II	
2020	Aunt Pearl (IRE)	Florent Geroux	Brad H. Cox	Michael Dubb, Madaket Stables, Peter Deutsch, Michael E. Kisber, The Elkstone Group	1 1/16 miles	1:40.86	$150,000	II	
2019	Sweet Melania	Jose L. Ortiz	Todd A. Pletcher	Lawana L. & Robert E. Low	1 1/16 miles	1:43.13	$200,000	II	
2018	Concrete Rose	Jose Lezcano	George R. Arnold II	Ashbrook Farm & BBN Racing	1 1/16 miles	1:44.09	$200,000	II	
2017	Rushing Fall	Javier Castellano	Chad C. Brown	e Five Racing Thoroughbreds	1 1/16 miles	1:46.20	$150,000	III	
2016	La Coronel	Florent Geroux	Mark E. Casse	John C. Oxley	1 1/16 miles	1:43.37	$150,000	III	
2015	Harmonize	Junior Alvarado	William I. Mott	Larkin Armstrong	1 1/16 miles	1:44.19	$150,000	III	
2014	Rainha Da Bateria	Joel Rosario	H. Graham Motion	Three Chimneys Farm	1 1/16 miles	1:43.85	$150,000	III	
2013	Kitten Kaboodle	Alan Garcia	Chad C. Brown	Kenneth and Sarah Ramsey	1 1/16 miles	1:44.01	$150,000	III	
2012	Moonwalk	Corey J. Lanerie	Dale L. Romans	Spendthrift Farm	1 1/16 miles	1:45.17	$150,000	III	
2011	Somali Lemonade	Alex O. Solis	Michael R. Matz	Caroline A. Forgason	1 1/16 miles	1:45.39	$150,000	III	
2010	Kathmanblu	Julien R. Leparoux	Kenneth G. McPeek	Five D Thoroughbreds & Wind River Stables	1 1/16 miles	1:44.01	$150,000	Listed	
2009	House of Grace	Michael J. Luzzi	Kenneth G. McPeek	Magdalena Racing	1 1/16 miles	1:44.32	$150,000	Listed	Off turf
2008	Laragh	Edgar S. Prado	John P. Terranova II	Golden Goose Enterprise & IEAH Stables	1 1/16 miles	1:43.54	$150,000	Listed	
2007	Wind in My Wings	Jamie Theriot	Reade Baker	Craig B. Singer	1 1/16 miles	1:45.34	$150,000	Listed	
2006	Swingit	Brian Hernandez Jr.	Hal R. Wiggins	Robert V. Hovelson	1 1/16 miles	1:43.37	$125,000	Listed	
2005	J'ray	Brice Blanc	Todd A. Pletcher	Lawrence Goichman	1 1/16 miles	1:45.57	$112,000	Listed	
Jessamine County Stakes
2004	Paddy's Daisy	John R. Velazquez	Todd A. Pletcher	Stonehaven Farm	1 1/16 miles	1:44.33	$112,600	Listed	
2003	Galloping Gal	Brice Blanc	Kenneth G. McPeek	William A. Carl	1 1/16 miles	1:44.56	$113,200	Listed	
Green River Stakes
2002	Ocean Drive	John R. Velazquez	Todd A. Pletcher	Bonnie & Sy Baskin	1 1/16 miles	1:44.30	$111,500	Listed	
2001	Stylelistick	Pat Day	William I. Mott	Dream With Me Stable & Team Valor	1 1/16 miles	1:45.88	$113,900	Listed	
2000	Word Puzzle	Marlon St. Julien	Charles Simon	Kenneth and Sarah Ramsey	1 1/16 miles	1:43.81	$84,075	Listed	
1999	Solvig	Pat Day	Carl A. Nafzger	Bentley L. Smith	1 1/16 miles	1:42.21	$67,025	Listed	
1998	Perfect Sting	Pat Day	Patrick B. Byrne	Stronach Stables	1 1/16 miles	1:43.77	$71,500	Listed	
1997	Runnaway Dream	Shane Sellers	W. Elliott Walden	William A. Carl	1 1/16 miles	1:43.60	$68,500	Listed	
1996	Parade Queen	Pat Day	Neil J. Howard	William S. Farish III & Edward J. Hudson	1 1/16 miles	1:45.21	$68,500	Listed	
1995	Antespend	Shane Sellers	D. Michael Smithwick Jr.	Jack Kent Cooke	1 1/16 miles	1:45.30	$63,000	Listed	
1994	Christmas Gift	Charles R. Woods Jr.	Mark A. Hennig	Edward P. Evans	1 1/16 miles	1:43.96	$46,100		Division 1
1994	Bail Out Becky	Shane Sellers	William I. Mott	Kenneth L. Ramsey	1 1/16 miles	1:44.16	$50,600		Division 2
1993	Fred's Affair	Joseph J. Steiner	Terry J. Brennan	Jeff Rand	1 1/16 miles	1:45.59	$49,000		
1992	Warside	Shane Sellers	Kenneth G. McPeek	Roy K. Monroe	1 1/16 miles	1:45.36	$45,500		
1991	Shes Just Super	Pat Day	W. Elliott Walden	William A. Carl	1 1/16 miles	1:44.91	$43,700		

Legend:
Turf All Weather Track

== See also ==
- List of American and Canadian Graded races
