= Gallorette Handicap top three finishers =

This is a listing of the horses that finished in either first, second, or third place and the number of starters in the Gallorette Handicap, an American Grade 3 race for fillies and mares age three and up at 1-1/16 miles on the turf held at Pimlico Race Course in Baltimore, Maryland. (1960–present)

| Year | Winner | Second | Third | Starters |
|---|---|---|---|---|
| 2026 | Warming | Child of the Moon (FR) | Cheetah Lady | 8 |
| 2025 | Charlene’s Dream | Austere | Ocean Club | 7 |
| 2024 | Fluffy Socks | Five Towns (GB) | Tequilera | 5 |
| 2023 | Whitebeam (GB) | Sopran Basilea | Bipartisanship | 7 |
| 2022 | Technical Analysis | Crystal Cliffs | In A Hurry | 6 |
| 2021 | Mean Mary | Vigilante's Way | Great Island | 6 |
| 2020 | Juliet Foxtrot | Varenka | No Mo Lady | 8 |
| 2019 | Mitchell Road | Thewayiam | Viva Vegas | 9 |
| 2018 | Ultra Brat | Blessed Silence | Brooks House | 8 |
| 2017 | Cambodia | On Leave | Elysea's World | 10 |
| 2016 | Miz Money | Vielsalm | Heath | 12 |
| 2015 | Watsdachances | Emotional Kitten | Sistas Stoll | 13 |
| 2014 | Somali Lemonade | Watsdachances | Triple Arch | 7 |
| 2013 | Pianist | Hard Not to Like | Appealing Cat | 10 |
| 2012 | Zagora | Speak Easy Gal | Laughing | 7 |
| 2011 | No Explaining | Desert Sage | Dyna Waltz | 8 |
| 2010 | Rainbow View | Quiet Meadow | Ave | 8 |
| 2009 | Social Queen | All Is Vanity | Tejida | 13 |
| 2008 | Roshani | Lady Digby | Valbenny | 5 |
| 2007 | Precious Kitten | A True Pussycat | Trick's Pic | 8 |
| 2006 | Ozone Bere | Humoristic | Art Fan | 13 |
| 2005 | Film Maker | Briviesca | Humoristic | 9 |
| 2004 | Ocean Drive | Film Maker | With Patience | 8 |
| 2003 | Carib Lady | Affirmed Dancer | Lady of the Future | 7 |
| 2002 | Quidnaskra | De Aar | Step With Style | 7 |
| 2001 | License Fee | Starine | Crystal Sea | 8 |
| 2000 | Colstar | Melody Queen | Terreavigne | 10 |
| 1999 | Winfama | Pleasant Temper | Earth to Jackie | 8 |
| 1998 | Tresoriere | Bursting Forth | Starry Dreamer | 7 |
| 1997 | Palliser Bay | Elusive | Sangria | 8 |
| 1996 | Aucilla | Julie's Brilliance | Brushing Gloom | 4 |
| 1995 | It's Personal | Churchbell Chimes | Open Toe | 6 |
| 1994 | Tribulation | McKaymackenna | Fleet Broad | 6 |
| 1993 | You'd Be Surprised | Captive Miss | Dior's Angel | 12 |
| 1992 | Brilliant Brass | Spanish Dior | Stem the Tide | 6 |
| 1991 | Miss Josh | Splendid Try | Highland Penny | 6 |
| 1990 | Highland Perry | Saphaedra | Channel Three | 8 |
| 1989 | Dance Teacher | Arcroyal | Fortunate Facts | 9 |
| 1988 | Just Class | Landaura | Hangin On a Star | 8 |
| 1987 | Scotch Heather | Catatonic | Foot Stone | 6 |
| 1986 | Natania | Scotch Heather | Valid Dodge | 12 |
| 1985 | La Reine Elaine | Stufida | Lady Emerald | 12 |
| 1984 | Kattegat's Pride | Amanti | Bright Choice | 7 |
| 1983 | Wedding Party | Sunny Sparkler | Bemissed | 8 |
| 1982 | Island Charm | Lovely Lei | Vibro Vibes | 10 |
| 1981 | Exactly So | Crimson April | Ernestine | 8 |
| 1980 | Jamila Kadir | The Very One | Wild Bidder | 10 |
| 1979 | Calderina | Dottie O. | Warfever | 10 |
| 1978 | Huggle Duggle | Council House | Nanticious | 10 |
| 1977 | Summertime Promise | Summer Session | Siz Ziz Zit | 9 |
| 1976 | Redundancy | Dos a Dos | Margravine | 8 |
| 1975 | Gulls Cry | Sarah Percy | Twixt | 10 |
| 1974 | Sara Green | Unknown Heiress | Out Cold | 14 |
| 1973 | Deb Marion | Aglimmer | Groton Miss | 11 |
| 1972 | Sun Colony | Tico's Donna | Alma North | n/a |
| 1971 | Cold Comfort | Daring Step | Luminous Lagoon | n/a |
| 1970 | Singing Rain | Shuvee | Miss Fall River | n/a |
| 1969 | Back in Paris | Singing Rain | Persian Intrigue | n/a |
| 1968 | Serene Queen | Straight Deal II | Politely | n/a |
| 1967 | Lady Diplomat | Straight Deal II | Indian Sunlight | n/a |
| 1966 | Gold Digger | Alondra II | Petticoat | n/a |
| 1965 | Gold Digger | Gallarush | Lovejoy | n/a |
| 1964 | Gay Serenade | Open Fire | My Card | n/a |
| 1963 | Double Heritage | Abby's Crown | Doll Ina | n/a |
| 1962 | Waltz Song | Cyclopavia | Royal Patrice | n/a |
| 1961 | Barnesville Miss | Colony Flyer | Miss Melisande | n/a |
| 1960 | Sister Antoine | Loyal Lady II | My Dear Girl | n/a |
| 1959 | High Bid | Polamby | A Glitter | n/a |
| 1958 | Hooiser Honey | Alanesian | Cousin Con | n/a |
| 1957 | Searching | Mlle. Dianne | Snow White | n/a |
| 1956 | Little Pache | Blue Banner | Searching | n/a |
| 1955 | Searching | Brightest Star | June Fete | n/a |
| 1954 | Mlle. Lorette | Dispute | Another World | n/a |
| 1953 | Sabette | Sunny Dale | Canadiana | n/a |
| 1952 | La Corredora | Kiss Me Kate | Marta | n/a |

== See also ==
- List of graded stakes at Pimlico Race Course
