= Commonwealth Oaks =

Virginia Oaks
- Class: Listed Stakes
- Location: Colonial Downs; New Kent County, Virginia
- Inaugurated: 2004
- Race type: Thoroughbred - Flat racing
- Website: www.colonialdowns.com

Race information
- Distance: 1 1/8 miles (9 furlongs)
- Surface: Turf
- Track: Left-handed
- Qualification: Three-year-old fillies
- Weight: Assigned
- Purse: $200,000 (2022)

The Virginia Oaks is an American Thoroughbred horse race that since 2019 has been run at Colonial Downs in New Kent County, Virginia. It was previously known as the Commonwealth Oaks when it was held at Laurel Park in Maryland. It is open to three-year-old fillies who are willing to run 1 1/8 miles on the turf.

The race was not run in 2014. It is a Listed Stakes event as of 2019. On April 19, 2018, The Virginia Racing Commission announced that the race would not be held that year.

The race was officially announced as a prep race for the Road to the Kentucky Oaks in 2025.

== Records ==
Speed record:

- 1:46.57 - My Impression (2016)

Most wins by an owner:

- 2 - William M. Backer (2004, 2009)
- 2 - Stuart S. Janney III (2015, 2016)

Most wins by a jockey:

- 3 - Forest Boyce (2013, 2015, 2019)

Most wins by a trainer:

- 2 - Hamilton A. Smith (2004, 2009)
- 2 - Claude R. McGaughey III (2015, 2016)

== Winners of the Virginia Oaks ==
Year	Winner	Jockey	Trainer	Owner	Distance (Miles)	Time	Grade
2025	Fondly	Irad Ortiz Jr.	H. Graham Motion	Eclipse Thoroughbred Partners	1 1/8	1:42.51	Listed
2024	Styles Points (DH)	Manuel Franco	Christophe Clement	Cheyenne Stable LLC	1 1/8	1:47.15	Listed
2024	Deep Satin (DH)	Mychel Sanchez	Cherie DeVaux	John D. Gunther & Eurowest Bloodstock Services	1 1/8	1:47.15	Listed
2023	Thirty Thou Kelvin	Trevor McCarthy	John P. Terranova II	SJB Stable	1 1/8	1:48.04	Listed
2022	Spirit and Glory	Irad Ortiz Jr.	Robert Falcone Jr.	Michael Nentwig, Michael Dubb, Beast Mode Racing, John Rochfort and Robert Falcone, Jr.	1 1/8	1:48.25	Listed
2021	Flippant	Rafael Bejarano	Victoria Oliver	G. Watts Humphrey, Jr.	1 1/8	1:46.47	Listed
2020	No Race	No Race	No Race	No Race	1 1/8	No Race	Listed
2019	Carnival Colors	Forest Boyce	Michael Stidham	Godolphin Stables	1 1/8	1:48.83	Listed
2018	No Race	No Race	No Race	No Race	1 1/8	No Race	III
2017	Rymska	Feargal Lynch	Chad Brown	Sheep Pond Partners, et al.	1 1/8	1:46.94	III
2016	My Impression	Jose Ortiz	Claude R. McGaughey	Stuart S. Janney III	1 1/8	1:46.57	III
2015	Onus	Forest Boyce	Claude R. McGaughey	Stuart S. Janney III	1 1/8	1:47.12	III
2014	No Race	No Race	No Race	No Race	1 1/8	No Race	III
2013	Nellie Cashman	Forest Boyce	Francis Abbott III	Sycamore Racing	1 1/8	1:52.86	III
2012	Volcat	Robby Albarado	Kenneth G. McPeek	Landaluce Educe Stables	1 1/8	1:52.18	III
2011	Excited	John Velazquez	Todd Pletcher	Michael B. Tabor	1 1/8	1:49.70	III
2010	Check the Label	Ramon A. Dominguez	H. Graham Motion	Brereton C. Jones	1 1/8	1:51.85	III
2009	Blind Date	Kent Desormeaux	Hamilton A. Smith	William M. Backer	1 1/8	1:49.59	III
2008	I Lost My Choo	Edgar Prado	Phillip Serpe	Flying Zee Stable	1 1/8	1:50.12	III
2007	Dreaming of Anna	E. T. Baird	Wayne Catalano	Frank C. Calabrese	1 1/8	1:47.38	
2006	Aunt Henny	Rafael Bejarano	Michael R. Matz	Erdenheim Farm	1 1/8	1:47.11	
2005	My Typhoon	Jerry Bailey	William I. Mott	Live Oak Racing	1 1/8	1:49.63	
2004	Art Fan	Ryan Fogelsonger	Hamilton A. Smith	William M. Backer	1 1/8	1:50.41	
