= Mint Julep Stakes =

Grade III Thoroughbred horse race

- Class: Grade III
- Location: Churchill Downs; Louisville, Kentucky, United States
- Inaugurated: 1977 (as Mint Julep Handicap)
- Race type: Thoroughbred - Flat racing
- Sponsor: Old Forester (since 2015)
- Website: Churchill Downs

Race information
- Distance: 1 1/16 miles (8 1/2 furlongs)
- Surface: Turf
- Track: Left-handed
- Qualification: Fillies and Mares, four-year-olds and older
- Weight: 124lbs with allowances
- Purse: $250,000 (2025)

The Mint Julep Stakes is a Grade III American Thoroughbred horse race for fillies and mares, four years old and older over a distance of one and one sixteenth miles on the turf scheduled annually in late May or early June at Churchill Downs in Louisville, Kentucky. It currently offers a purse of $250,000.

== History ==
From its inaugural running in 1977 to 1986, the event was run on the dirt course, but was moved to the turf course beginning in 1987.

The race is named for the Mint Julep, a popular drink with racing fans at Churchill Downs, particularly seen on Kentucky Derby day.

The event was split into divisions in 1987 and 1990.

Between 1983 and 2004 the conditions of the event were for fillies and mares that were four year olds and older.

In 2001 the event was upgraded to a Grade III.

From 2001 to 2014 the event was known as the Early Time Mint Julep Handicap. Beginning in 2015, the Mint Julep Handicap became the Old Forester Mint Julep Handicap for sponsorship reasons.

=== Distances ===
It has been run at the following distances:

- 1 1/16 miles (1.71 km) : 1990–present
- 1 1/8 miles (1.81 km) : 1988–1989
- 1 mile (1.61 km) : 1983–1987
- 7 furlongs (1.41 km) : 1977–1982

== Records ==
Speed record

- 1 1/16 miles – 1:40.55 Pin Up Betty (2025)

Margins

- 5 lengths – Lillian Russell (1981)

Most wins

- 2 – Megans Bluff (2001, 2002)

Most wins by an owner

- 2 – Carl F. Pollard (2003, 2015)
- 2 – James C. Routsong (2001, 2002)
- 2 – Richard and Bertram Klein (2013, 2016)
- 2 – Madaket Stables (2020, 2021)

Most wins by a jockey

- 4 – Robby Albarado (1997, 2005, 2006, 2007)

Most wins by a trainer

- 5 – William I. Mott (1987, 1996, 2005, 2006, 2007)

== Winners ==
Year	Winner	Age	Jockey	Trainer	Owner	Distance	Time	Purse	Grade	Ref
2026	Sweet Treasure	4	Irad Ortiz Jr.	Brad H. Cox	Full of Run Racing II & Frank Silva	1 1/16 miles	1:40.29	$269,500	III	
2025	Pin Up Betty	4	Luis Saez	Michael J. Maker	Three Diamonds Farm	1 1/16 miles	1:40.55	$237,000	III	
2024	Delahaye	5	Tyler Gaffalione	Chad C. Brown	William H. Lawrence & Three Chimneys Farm	1 1/16 miles	1:45.46	$249,668	III	
2023	Henrietta Topham	5	James Graham	Geoff Mulcahy	Cambus-Kenneth Farm	1 1/16 miles	1:42.46	$222,000	III	
2022	Gam's Mission	4	Adam Beschizza	Cherie DeVaux	Lazy F Ranch	1 1/16 miles	1:43.53	$193,350	III	
2021	Mintd (IRE)	5	Ricardo Santana Jr.	Brendan P. Walsh	Bradley Thoroughbreds, Madaket Stables, Team Hanley, Tim & Anna Cambron	1 1/16 miles	1:43.92	$150,000	III	
2020	Secret Message	5	John Velazquez	H. Graham Motion	Madaket Stables, Heider Family Stables, ERJ Racing, Elayne Stables & S. Bouchey	1 1/16 miles	1:43.13	$100,000	III	
2019	Mom's On Strike	5	Adam Beschizza	Joe Sharp	Carl R. Moore Management & Brad Grady	1 1/16 miles	1:47.63	$125,000	III	
2018	Lovely Bernadette	5	Corey J. Lanerie	Bernard S. Flint	James M. Miller	1 1/16 miles	1:42.36	$100,000	III	
2017	Dona Bruja (ARG)	5	Declan Cannon	Ignacio Correas IV	Ivan Gasparotto	1 1/16 miles	1:41.46	$100,000	III	
2016	Cash Control	4	Shaun Bridgmohan	Brad H. Cox	Richard & Bertram Klein	1 1/16 miles	1:41.12	$100,000	III	
2015	Kiss Moon	4	Corey J. Lanerie	David R. Vance	Carl F. Pollard	1 1/16 miles	1:40.94	$100,000	III	
2014	Honey Hues	5	Jesus Lopez Castanon	Bernard S. Flint	L.T B. Inc/Childers	1 1/16 miles	1:41.75	$110,400	III	
2013	Miz Ida	4	Shaun Bridgmohan	Steve Margolis	Richard, Bertram & Elaine Klein	1 1/16 miles	1:42.37	$109,100	III	
2012	Bizzy Caroline	4	Manoel Cruz	Kenneth G. McPeek	Catesby W. Clay	1 1/16 miles	1:43.29	$111,000	III	
2011	My Baby Baby	6	Manoel Cruz	Kenneth G. McPeek	Magdalena Racing	1 1/16 miles	1:42.40	$113,900	III	
2010	Hot Cha Cha	4	James Graham	Philip A. Sims	Nelson McMakin	1 1/16 miles	1:43.27	$110,800	III	
2009	Acoma	4	Corey J. Lanerie	David M. Carroll	Helen Groves & Helen Alexander	1 1/16 miles	1:43.10	$109,000	III	
2008	Dreaming of Anna	4	Garrett K. Gomez	Wayne M. Catalano	Frank C. Calabrese	1 1/16 miles	1:42.77	$169,950	III	
2007	Quite a Bride	4	Robby Albarado	William I. Mott	Haras Santa Maria de Araras	1 1/16 miles	1:40.70	$164,100	III	
2006	My Typhoon (IRE)	4	Robby Albarado	William I. Mott	Live Oak Racing	1 1/16 miles	1:41.55	$115,000	III	
2005	Delta Princess	6	Robby Albarado	William I. Mott	Saud bin Khaled	1 1/16 miles	1:42.43	$110,100	III	
2004	Stay Forever	7	Eddie Castro	Martin D. Wolfson	Santa Cruz Ranch/Juan Rizo	1 1/16 miles	1:42.66	$168,300	III	
2003	Kiss the Devil	5	Lonnie Meche	David R. Vance	Carl F. Pollard	1 1/16 miles	1:41.73	$168,300	III	
2002	Megans Bluff	5	Craig Perret	John K. Hennig	James C. Routsong	1 1/16 miles	1:42.87	$112,900	III	
2001	Megans Bluff	4	Craig Perret	John K. Hennig	James C. Routsong	1 1/16 miles	1:42.88	$113,600	III	
2000	Pratella	5	Larry Melancon	Burk Kessinger Jr.	Bruce Barton/Alvin Haynes	1 1/16 miles	1:43.08	$111,900	Listed	
1999	Mingling Glances	5	Larry Melancon	Burk Kessinger Jr.	Morven Stud Farm	1 1/16 miles	1:42.59	$114,400	Listed	
1998	B. A. Valentine	5	Francisco C. Torres	Dale L. Romans	Alberta Butner	1 1/16 miles	1:41.42	$114,200	Listed	
1997	†Valor Lady	5	Robby Albarado	Mark A. Hennig	Amerman Racing Stable	1 1/16 miles	1:41.20	$114,900	Listed	
1996	Bail Out Becky	4	Craig Perret	William I. Mott	Kenneth and Sarah Ramsey	1 1/16 miles	1:41.86	$84,150	Listed	
1995	Romy	4	Juvenal Lopez Diaz	Moises R. Yanez	William L. Pacella et al.	1 1/16 miles	1:42.69	$84,525	Listed	
1994	Words of War	5	Carlos H. Marquez Jr.	Joseph E. Kasperski Jr.	Lawrence Karp	1 1/16 miles	1:40.98	$85,650	Listed	
1993	Classic Reign	4	Fabio A. Arguello Jr.	James E. Day	Sam-Son Farm	1 1/16 miles	1:42.84	$57,500	Listed	
1992	Lady Shirl	5	Patrick A. Johnson	P. Noel Hickey	Irish Acres Farm (P. Noel Hickey)	1 1/16 miles	1:41.41	$57,050	Listed	
1991	Dance for Lucy	5	Larry Melancon	Sheldon Wolfe	Alexander Schmidt	1 1/16 miles	1:43.07	$57,150	Listed	
1990	Tunita	5	Robert J. Thibeau Jr.	George R. Arnold II	John Peace	1 1/16 miles	1:43.80	$48,425	Listed	Division 1
1990	Phoenix Sunshine	5	Joseph Deegan	Del Loveland	Judy Hicks	1 1/16 miles	1:43.20	$48,425	Listed	Division 2
1989	Here's Your Silver	4	Michael McDowell	Steven C. Penrod	Hermitage Farm	1 1/8 miles	1:50.40	$57,100	Listed	
1988	How I Wish	4	Earlie Fires	Joseph E. Broussard	Estate of Joe Siggio	1 1/8 miles	1:51.00	$56,400	Listed	
1987	Thunderdome	4	Steve H. Bass	Harry E. Trotsek	Edward A. Seltzer	1 mile	1:37.80	$40,005	Listed	Division 1
1987	Innsbruck (GB)	4	Sandy Hawley	William I. Mott	Diana Firestone	1 mile	1:38.00	$35,280	Listed	Division 2
1986	Zenobia Empress	5	Earlie Fires	Joseph M. Bollero	Russell Fortune Jr.	1 mile	1:35.80	$44,695	Listed	
1985	Stave	4	Charles R. Woods Jr.	Ted McClain	Hidaway Farm	1 mile	1:35.00	$32,375	Listed	
1984	Lass Trump	4	Garth Patterson	C. R. McGaughey III	Al Samford	1 mile	1:37.00	$40,410	Listed	
1983	Naskra Magic	4	Phil Rubbicco	James O. Keefer	Jim Thomas	1 mile	1:36.60	$35,750	Listed	
1982	Kate's Cabin	4	Eddie Snell	Lee Snell	Ruth Cummings	7 furlongs	1:25.20	$36,100	Listed	
1981	Lillian Russell	4	Ronald J. Hirdes Jr.	Raymond S. Lawrence Jr.	Leslie Combs II	7 furlongs	1:23.20	$29,950	Listed	
1980	Likely Exchange	6	David E. Whited	Thomas H. Stevens Sr.	G. Watts Humphrey Jr. & Pamela Firman	7 furlongs	1:24.20	$30,225	Listed	
1979	Bold Rendezvous	4	Alexander L. Fernandez	James E. Morgan	John Bolan, T. Wood Jr. & C. Labanz	7 furlongs	1:25.00	$28,175	Listed	
1978	Time for Pleasure	4	Thomas Barrow	Phil A. Grosser	William Q. Muir	7 furlongs	1:23.40	$22,475		
1977	Satan's Cheer	5	Mike Manganello	Peter W. Salmen Jr.	Crimson King Farm	7 furlongs	1:24.00	$22,000		

Legend:
Turf Dirt
Notes:
† In 1997, Romy won but was disqualified for interference in the stretch and set back to fourth.
