= License fee =

License fee may mean:

- a fee paid for a license in general
- a fee paid for a television licence (most common usage of this phrase in the United Kingdom)
- License Fee (horse), a racehorse
