= Gold Digger (horse) =

American thoroughbred racehorse

- Sire: Nashua
- Grandsire: Nasrullah
- Dam: Sequence
- Damsire: Count Fleet
- Sex: Mare
- Foaled: 1962
- Country: USA
- Breeder: Leslie Combs II & Brownell Combs
- Owner: Dorothy L. Combs
- Trainer: E. Jouett Reed
- Record: 35: 10-2-4
- Earnings: $127,255

Major wins
- Columbiana Handicap (1965); Marigold Stakes (1965); Yo Tambien Handicap (1965); Gallorette Handicap (1965, 1966)

Gold Digger (May 28, 1962 - February 21, 1990) was an American Thoroughbred racemare who won back-to-back runnings of the Gallorette Handicap but is most famous for being the Dam of Mr. Prospector.

== Background ==
Gold Digger's name came from the highly publicized 1955 murder of William Woodward Jr. who owned Gold Digger's sire, Nashua. The word "gold digger" refers to a person who engages in a relationship for money instead of love.

== Career ==
Owned by Leslie Combs II's wife Dorothy (née Enslow), Gold Digger was trained by Jouett Reed. Gold Digger's first race was on January 1, 1964, in which she finished 3rd in the Matron Stakes. 1964 proved to be a winless year for Gold Digger. She won the 1965 Columbiana Handicap in February 1965.

Gold Digger captured the September 1965 Marigold Stakes at Latonia Race Track in Kentucky, then in October won the Yo Tambien Handicap at Chicago's Hawthorne Race Course. She then won the November 1965 Gallorette Handicap at Pimlico Race Course in Baltimore. She got her last victory on May 7, 1966, capturing the Gallorette Handicap for the second time.

Gold Digger was retired from breeding in 1984 and was euthanized on February 21, 1990.

== Stud career ==
Gold Digger's descendants include: c = colt, f = filly

Foaled	Name	Sex	Major Wins
1970	Mr. Prospector	c	Gravesend Handicap (1974); Whirlaway Handicap (1974)
1971	Gold Standard	c	Los Feliz Stakes (1974); Cortez Handicap (1976)
1977	Lillian Russell	f	Mint Julep Handicap (1981); Cleopatra Handicap (1981)

== Pedigree ==
Pedigree of Gold Digger (USA), bay mare, 1962
Sire Nashua (USA) b. 1952	Nasrullah (GB) b. 1940	Nearco	Pharos
Sire Nashua (USA) b. 1952	Nasrullah (GB) b. 1940	Nearco	Nogara
Sire Nashua (USA) b. 1952	Nasrullah (GB) b. 1940	Mumtaz Begum	Blenheim
Sire Nashua (USA) b. 1952	Nasrullah (GB) b. 1940	Mumtaz Begum	Mumtaz Mahal
Sire Nashua (USA) b. 1952	Segula (USA) b. 1942	Johnstown	Jamestown
Sire Nashua (USA) b. 1952	Segula (USA) b. 1942	Johnstown	La France
Sire Nashua (USA) b. 1952	Segula (USA) b. 1942	Sekhmet	Sardanapale
Sire Nashua (USA) b. 1952	Segula (USA) b. 1942	Sekhmet	Prosopopee
Dam Sequence (USA) b. 1946	Count Fleet (USA) b. 1940	Reigh Count	Sunreigh
Dam Sequence (USA) b. 1946	Count Fleet (USA) b. 1940	Reigh Count	Contessina
Dam Sequence (USA) b. 1946	Count Fleet (USA) b. 1940	Quickly	Haster
Dam Sequence (USA) b. 1946	Count Fleet (USA) b. 1940	Quickly	Stephanie
Dam Sequence (USA) b. 1946	Miss Dogwood (USA) b. 1939	Bull Dog	Teddy
Dam Sequence (USA) b. 1946	Miss Dogwood (USA) b. 1939	Bull Dog	Plucky Liege
Dam Sequence (USA) b. 1946	Miss Dogwood (USA) b. 1939	Myrtlewood	Blue Larkspur
Dam Sequence (USA) b. 1946	Miss Dogwood (USA) b. 1939	Myrtlewood	Frizeur
