= My Typhoon =

Irish-bred Thoroughbred racehorse

- Sire: Giant's Causeway
- Grandsire: Storm Cat
- Dam: Urban Sea
- Damsire: Miswaki
- Sex: Mare
- Foaled: 2002
- Country: Ireland
- Colour: Chestnut
- Breeder: Sunderland Holdings
- Owner: Live Oak Plantation
- Trainer: William I. Mott
- Record: 22: 9-3-3
- Earnings: $1,308,361

Major wins
- Hilltop Stakes (2005); Mrs. Revere Stakes (2005); Virginia Oaks (2005); Mint Julep Handicap (2006); Ballston Spa Breeders' Cup Handicap (2006); Jenny Wiley Stakes (2007); Just A Game Breeders' Cup Handicap (2007); Diana Handicap (2007)
- Last updated on May 16, 2010

My Typhoon (foaled 2002 in Ireland) is an American Thoroughbred racehorse whom the NTRA calls "one of the world's best-bred horses."

== Background ==
Bred in Ireland by David Tsui's Sunderland Holdings, she was sired by Giant's Causeway, a son of Storm Cat whose stud fee in 2006 became the highest in the world at $500,000. Her dam is Urban Sea, winner of the 1993 Prix de l'Arc de Triomphe, and her damsire was Miswaki, a two-time Leading broodmare sire in Great Britain & Ireland and a son of Mr. Prospector. My Typhoon is a half-sister to Galileo, a colt who won the 2001 Epsom Derby, Irish Derby, and King George VI and Queen Elizabeth Stakes and was voted the 2001 European Champion Three-Year-Old. She is also a half sister to Sea the Stars.

At the December 2002 Tattersalls Sale, My Typhoon was sold as a weanling to Live Oak Stud of Ocala, Florida, for a then-record price of US$2.95 million. Her new owners entrusted her race conditioning to U.S. Racing Hall of Fame trainer William I. Mott.

== Racing career ==
At Churchill Downs in 2005, My Typhoon won her first significant race, capturing the Grade II Mrs. Revere Stakes. She won again that year at Colonial Downs, taking the Virginia Oaks. At age four, she returned to racing and in May 2006 won the Grade III Gallorette Handicap at Pimlico Race Course and June's Grade II Mint Julep Handicap back at Churchill Downs. In August, she won the GII Ballston Spa Breeders' Cup Handicap and after a third place in the First Lady Stakes at Keeneland Race Course returned to Churchill Downs, where she finished sixth in November's Breeders' Cup Filly & Mare Turf won by Ouija Board.

Despite being extremely valuable for her breeding potential, My Typhoon returned to the track at age five. She began 2007 in March with a second-place finish in the Hillsborough Stakes at Tampa Bay Downs, then won April's Grade III Jenny Wiley Stakes at Keeneland Race Course. Shipped north, in June she won the Grade II Just A Game Stakes at Belmont Park and at Saratoga Race Course on July 28 won her third straight stakes under jockey Eddie Castro. Her victory in the 1 1/8 miles (1.8 km) Diana Handicap turf race marked her first Grade 1 win and was also significant because throughout her racing career, she struggled at distances beyond 1 1/16 mi (1.7 km). As well, under the new Breeders' Cup "Win and You're In" provision for designated races, her victory in the Diana Handicap guaranteed her a berth in the 2007 Breeders' Cup Filly & Mare Turf. In her next outing on August 23, My Typhoon finished sixth in the Ballston Spa Handicap.
