= Ballston Spa Stakes =

- Class: Grade II
- Location: Saratoga Race Course; Saratoga Springs, New York, United States
- Inaugurated: 1984
- Race type: Thoroughbred – Flat racing
- Sponsor: Mohegan Sun (2023)
- Website: NYRA

Race information
- Distance: 1 1/16 miles
- Surface: Turf
- Track: Left-handed
- Qualification: Fillies & Mares, four-years-old and older
- Weight: 124 lbs with allowances
- Purse: $300,000 (2023)

The Ballston Spa Stakes is a Grade II American Thoroughbred horse race for fillies and mares that are four years old or older over a distance of one and one-sixteenth miles on the turf course scheduled annually in late July or early August at Saratoga Race Course in Saratoga Springs, New York. The event currently carries a purse of $300,000.

== History ==
The inaugural running of the Ballston Spa Stakes was 4 August 1983 and was restricted to New York State bred fillies and mares that were three years old or older and run at a distance of 7 furlongs on the dirt. The name of the event honors Ballston Spa, New York, a small town just south of Saratoga Springs. The Ballston Spa name was not used again until 1997.

NYRA created a race in 1989 with Breeders' Cup incentives that was the forerunner of today's event. The event with additional sponsorship from Budweiser was known as the Aqueduct Budweiser Breeders' Cup Handicap and it was run in late October over a distance of one mile. In 1994 the event was moved to Saratoga and was renamed as the Saratoga Breeders' Cup Handicap with an increase of distance to 1 1/16 miles.

In 1995 the event was classified as Grade III and upgraded to Grade II in 2006.

In 1997 the event was renamed once more to the Ballston Spa Handicap.

The 2002 event was taken off the turf track due to consistent rain during the days before the event which resulted in seven scratchings leaving a small field of three to run. Surya won by the stakes largest distance of 9 1/4 lengths with over 50 lengths separating second and third on the muddy track.

Several champions have won this event including the 2004–05 Australian Champion Three Year Old Filly Alinghi, the 2006 US Champion Three-Year-Old Filly Wait A While, who was a dual winner of the event, the 2012 US Champion Female Turf Horse French bred Zagora who later that year would also win the Breeders' Cup Filly & Mare Turf and Lady Eli, US Champion Female Turf Horse in 2017.

== Records ==
Speed record:

- 1 1/16 miles: 1:38.77 – Strike Charmer (2016)
- 1 mile: 1:33.80 – Wakonda (1989)

Margins:

- 9 1/4 lengths – Surya (2002)

Most wins:

- 2 – Weekend Madness (1994, 1995)
- 2 – Wait A While (2007, 2008)

Most wins by an owner:

- 2 – New Phoenix Stable (1994, 1995)
- 2 – Arindel Farm (2007, 2008)

Most wins by a jockey:

- 5 – John Velazquez (1997, 2003, 2004, 2007, 2008)

Most wins by a trainer:

- 8 – Chad C. Brown (2012, 2015, 2017, 2018, 2019, 2021, 2022, 2024)

== Winners ==
Year	Winner	Age	Jockey	Trainer	Owner	Distance	Time	Purse	Grade	Ref
At Saratoga – Ballston Spa Stakes
2026	And One More Time	4	Javier Castellano	Mark E. Casse	Live Oak Plantation	1 1/16 miles	1:40.80	$300,000	II	
2025	Ozara (IRE)	4	Dylan Davis	Miguel Clement	Cheyenne Stable	1 1/16 miles	1:39.65	$300,000	II	
2024	Beaute Cachee (FR)	5	Frankie Dettori	Chad C. Brown	Louis Lazzinnaro, Madaket Stables, Michael J. Caruso & Michael Dubb	1 1/16 miles	1:44.41	$279,000	II	
2023	Evvie Jets	5	Manuel Franco	Mertkan Kantarmaci	Estate of Robert J. Amendola	abt. 1 1/16 miles	1:43.06	$300,000	II	
2022	Technical Analysis (IRE)	4	José L. Ortiz	Chad C. Brown	Klaravich Stables	1 1/16 miles	1:42.90	$388,000	II	
2021	Viadera	5	Joel Rosario	Chad C. Brown	Juddmonte	1 1/16 miles	1:41.82	$400,000	II	
2020	Starship Jubilee	7	Javier Castellano	Kevin Attard	Blue Heaven Farm	1 1/16 miles	1:41.76	$194,000	II	
2019	Significant Form	4	John R. Velazquez	Chad C. Brown	Stephanie Seymour Brant	1 1/16 miles	1:41.39	$400,000	II	
2018	Quidura (GB)	5	José L. Ortiz	Chad C. Brown	Peter M. Brant	1 1/16 miles	1:39.67	$392,000	II	
2017	Lady Eli	5	Irad Ortiz Jr.	Chad C. Brown	Sheep Pond Partners	1 1/16 miles	1:39.70	$384,000	II	
2016	Strike Charmer	6	Junior Alvarado	Mark A. Hennig	Courtland Farms	1 1/16 miles	1:38.77	$400,000	II	
2015	Dacita (CHI)	4	Javier Castellano	Chad C. Brown	Sheep Pond Partners & Bradley Thoroughbreds	1 1/16 miles	1:39.67	$400,000	II	
2014	Abaco	6	José L. Ortiz	Claude R. McGaughey III	Phipps Stable	1 1/16 miles	1:42.64	$250,000	II	
2013	Laughing (IRE)	5	Jose Lezcano	Alan E. Goldberg	Richard Santulli	1 1/16 miles	1:40.37	$250,000	II	
2012	Zagora (FR)	5	Ramon A. Dominguez	Chad C. Brown	Martin S. Schwartz	1 1/16 miles	1:39.07	$250,000	II	
2011	Daveron (GER)	6	Eddie Castro	H. Graham Motion	Team Valor International	1 1/16 miles	1:40.09	$200,000	II	
2010	Dynaslew	4	Eibar Coa	Seth Benzel	Live Oak Plantation	1 1/16 miles	1:40.58	$200,000	II	
Ballston Spa Handicap
2009	Salve Germania (IRE)	4	Javier Castellano	Waldemar Hickst	Hellwig Manfred	1 1/16 miles	1:47.25	$200,000	II	
2008	Wait A While	5	John R. Velazquez	Todd A. Pletcher	Arindel Farm	1 1/16 miles	1:39.70	$196,000	II	
2007	Wait A While	4	Garrett K. Gomez	Todd A. Pletcher	Arindel Farm	1 1/16 miles	1:40.00	$200,000	II	
2006	My Typhoon (IRE)	4	Garrett K. Gomez	William I. Mott	Live Oak Plantation	1 1/16 miles	1:41.72	$200,000	II	
2005	Alinghi (AUS)	4	Edgar S. Prado	Robert J. Frankel	John Messara, John Leaver & Alan Jones	1 1/16 miles	1:40.30	$135,966	III	
2004	Ocean Drive	4	John R. Velazquez	Todd A. Pletcher	Bonnie & Sy Baskin	1 1/16 miles	1:43.92	$201,000	III	
2003	Stylish	5	John R. Velazquez	William I. Mott	Estate of Ahmed bin Salman	1 1/16 miles	1:41.03	$213,400	III	
2002	Surya	4	Jerry D. Bailey	Robert J. Frankel	Flaxman Stable	1 1/8 miles	1:52.29	$191,800	Listed	
2001	Penny's Gold	4	Jerry D. Bailey	Christophe Clement	Overbrook Farm	1 1/16 miles	1:40.69	$190,200	III	
2000	License Fee	5	Pat Day	W. Elliott Walden	Winstar Farm	1 1/16 miles	1:43.53	$206,500	III	
1999	Pleasant Temper	5	Jerry D. Bailey	W. Elliott Walden	Mark H. Stanley	1 1/16 miles	1:41.84	$207,800	III	
1998	Memories of Silver	5	Jerry D. Bailey	James J. Toner	Joan G. Phillips	1 1/16 miles	1:40.93	$211,000	III	
1997	Valor Lady	5	John R. Velazquez	Mark A. Hennig	Jerome & John Amerman	1 1/16 miles	1:39.47	$217,000	III	
Saratoga Breeders' Cup Handicap
1996	Danish (IRE)	5	José A. Santos	Christophe Clement	Jayeff B Stables	1 1/16 miles	1:41.50	$210,600	III	
1995	Weekend Madness (IRE)	5	Shane Sellers	Burk Kessinger Jr.	New Phoenix Stable	1 1/16 miles	1:40.34	$155,500	III	
1994	Weekend Madness (IRE)	4	Shane Sellers	Burk Kessinger Jr.	New Phoenix Stable	1 1/16 miles	1:43.77	$155,850	Listed	
At Aqueduct – Aqueduct Breeders' Cup Handicap
1993	One Dreamer	5	Earlie Fires	Thomas F. Proctor	Glen Hill Farm	1 mile	1:39.38	$157,400	Listed	
1992	Aurora	4	Craig Perret	Flint S. Schulhofer	Helen K. Groves	1 mile	1:36.94	$156,450	Listed	
1991	Paris Opera	5	Gary L. Stevens	Lawrence W. Jennings Jr.	Earle I. Mack	1 mile	1:37.41	$157,450	Listed	
1990	Fire the Groom	3	Lanfranco Dettori	Luca M. Cumani	Randall Dee Hubbard	1 mile	1:35.20	$159,700		
1989	Wakonda	5	Ángel Cordero Jr.	Spasoje Dimitrijevic	John A. Nerud	1 mile	1:33.80	$156,500		
1984–1988		Race not held								
At Saratoga – Ballston Spa Stakes
1983	§ Subversive Chick	3	Declan J. Murphy	Michael C. Sedlacek	Badlands Stable	7 furlongs	1:24.20	$37,500	‡Restricted	

Legend:
Turf Dirt
Notes:
§ Ran as an entry
‡ The inaugural event was restricted to New York State bred fillies and mares that are three years old or older.

== See also ==
List of American and Canadian Graded races
