= Robert E. Holthus =

American horse trainer

Bob Holthus
Personal information
- Born: June 24, 1934 Table Rock, Nebraska, U.S.
- Died: November 22, 2011 (aged 77)
- Occupation: Trainer

Horse racing career
- Sport: Horse racing
- Career wins: 2,824

Major racing wins
- Massachusetts Handicap (1962); Rebel Stakes (1964, 1972, 1977, 2005, 2006); Churchill Downs Handicap (1966, 1967); Phoenix Stakes (1966); Lafayette Stakes (1976); Arkansas Derby (1988, 2006); Metropolitan Handicap (1989); Philip H. Iselin Handicap (1989); Martha Washington Stakes (1993, 1996, 1999); Indian Summer Stakes (1998); Southwest Stakes (2000, 2001, 2006); Kentucky Jockey Club Stakes (2004); Arlington-Washington Breeders' Cup Futurity (2006); Pocahontas Stakes (2007); Golden Rod Stakes (2007); Regret Stakes (2008); American Oaks (2008); Black Gold Stakes (2009); Modesty Handicap (2009); Flower Bowl Invitational Stakes (2009)

Racing awards
- Leading trainer at Oaklawn Park (1969, 1971, 1977–1978, 1982, 1985, 1989–1990–1991)

Honours
- Arkansas Walk of Fame (2000)

Significant horses
- Proper Reality, Bay Phantom; Lawyer Ron, Officer Rocket, Pure Clan

Robert E. "Bob" Holthus (June 24, 1934 – November 22, 2011) was an American Thoroughbred racehorse trainer. As a second generation trainer, Holthus learned the profession from his father, Paul Holthus.

Holthus is the all-time winningest trainer at Oaklawn Park and as of 2005 had won nine trainer's titles there. He also won training titles at Chicago's Arlington Park and Hawthorne Race Course, the Detroit Race Course, Ellis Park Racecourse in Henderson, Kentucky, Louisiana Downs in Bossier City, Louisiana plus a fall meeting at Turfway Park in the suburbs of Cincinnati, Ohio.

Bob Holthus was the trainer for the Kentucky Derby entrants Proper Reality, Greater Good and Pro Prado but is best known nationally as the trainer of Pure Clan and Lawyer Ron from the start of his career in 2005 until October 2006.

Bob Holthus and his widow Bonnie owned the Kilkerry Farm at Royal, Arkansas near Hot Springs at the time of his death.
