= Pocahontas Stakes =

- Class: Grade III
- Location: Churchill Downs; Louisville, Kentucky, United States
- Inaugurated: 1969
- Race type: Thoroughbred – Flat racing
- Website: Churchill Downs

Race information
- Distance: 1 mile
- Surface: Dirt
- Track: left-handed
- Qualification: Two-years-old fillies
- Weight: 122lbs with allowances
- Purse: US$300,000 (since 2021)
- Bonuses: Win and You're In Breeders' Cup Juvenile Fillies

The Pocahontas Stakes is a Grade III American Thoroughbred horse race for two-year-old fillies over a distance of 1 1/16 one mile on the dirt scheduled annually in September at Churchill Downs in Louisville, Kentucky.

== History ==
The race was first held on Thanksgiving Day, 27 November 1969, and was fittingly named for Pocahontas, the daughter of Native-American chief Powhatan, who aided the early American settlers, and the same-named Pocahontas, the 19th-century British-bred thoroughbred mare, who had a great influence on the breed.

The stakes race remained a Thanksgiving Day event until 1982, when it was moved to the early weeks of the Fall Meet.

The event was first classified as a Grade III race in 2005 and a Grade II race in 2010. In 2020, the event was downgraded back to Grade III.

The distance of the race originated at 7 furlongs and was run at that distance for the first 13 years, from 1969 to 1981. The distance was changed to one mile beginning in 1982 and continued at that distance through 2012. In 2013, the distance was increased to 1 1/16 miles. In 2020 and 2023, the event was reduced back to 1 mile.

The event was split into divisions eight times, with the last occurrence in 1983.

The new scheduling allowed the Pocahontas to become a major prep for the Breeders' Cup Juvenile Fillies. It is a "Win and You're In" race in the Breeders' Cup Challenge series.

The Pocahontas is the first step on the annual Road to the Kentucky Oaks, a points system to qualify for the Kentucky Oaks at Churchill Downs in the spring of the following year.

== Records ==
Speed record

- 1 1/16 miles: 1:43.78 – Hidden Connection (2021)
- 1 mile: 1:34.57 – Sara Louise (2008)
- 7 furlongs: 1:22.40 – Fair Ye Well (1970)

Margins

- 19 1/2 lengths – Serengeti Empress (2018)

Most wins by a jockey

- 7 – Pat Day (1983 div.1, 1983 div.2, 1984, 1987, 1994, 1995, 2004)

Most wins by a trainer

- 5 – Kenneth G. McPeek (2015, 2016, 2022, 2023, 2025)

Most wins by an owner

- 3 – Wilmott Stables (1991, 1996, 1997)

== Winners ==
| Year | Winner | Jockey | Trainer | Owner | Distance | Time | Purse | Grade | Ref |
|---|---|---|---|---|---|---|---|---|---|
| 2026 | Manuka Honey | Luis Saez | Brian A. Lynch | Lisa Lee, Jason Sciortino, William Lynch, Brian Howe and Terry Hamilton | 1 mile | 1:36.90 | $300,000 | III | |
| 2025 | Taken by the Wind | Irad Ortiz Jr. | Kenneth G. McPeek | Magdalena Racing, Terry Bradshaw & Graham Leveston | 1 mile | 1:36.50 | $251,250 | III | |
| 2024 | La Cara | Ricardo Santana Jr. | Mark E. Casse | Tracy Farmer | 1 mile | 1:37.82 | $292,335 | III | |
| 2023 | V V's Dream | Brian Hernandez Jr. | Kenneth G. McPeek | MJM Racing | 1 mile | 1:36.45 | $300,000 | III | |
| 2022 | Fun and Feisty | Julien Leparoux | Kenneth G. McPeek | Lucky Seven Stable | 1 1/16 miles | 1:45.86 | $297,536 | III | |
| 2021 | Hidden Connection | Reylu Gutierrez | W. Bret Calhoun | Hidden Brook Farm and Black Type Thoroughbreds | 1 1/16 miles | 1:43.78 | $299,700 | III | |
| 2020 | Girl Daddy | Joseph Talamo | Dale Romans | Albaugh Family Stables LLC | 1 mile | 1:34.94 | $200,000 | III | |
| 2019 | Lazy Daisy | Abel Cedillo | Doug F. O'Neill | ERJ Racing, Great Friends Stable & Tom Mansor | 1 1/16 miles | 1:44.89 | $200,000 | II | |
| 2018 | Serengeti Empress | Corey J. Lanerie | Thomas M. Amoss | Joel Politi | 1 1/16 miles | 1:45.47 | $200,000 | II | |
| 2017 | Patrona Margarita | Brian Hernandez Jr. | W. Bret Calhoun | Craig D. Upham | 1 1/16 miles | 1:46.35 | $200,000 | II | |
| 2016 | Daddys Lil Darling | Corey J. Lanerie | Kenneth G. McPeek | Normandy Farm | 1 1/16 miles | 1:47.19 | $200,000 | II | |
| 2015 | Dothraki Queen | Corey J. Lanerie | Kenneth G. McPeek | Magdalena Racing | 1 1/16 miles | 1:45.80 | $200,000 | II | |
| 2014 | Cristina's Journey | Miguel Mena | Dale L. Romans | GSN Racing | 1 1/16 miles | 1:46.37 | $231,000 | II | |
| 2013 | Untapable | Rosie Napravnik | Steven M. Asmussen | Winchell Thoroughbreds | 1 1/16 miles | 1:44.38 | $168,150 | II | |
| 2012 | Sign | Rosie Napravnik | Albert Stall Jr. | Claiborne Farm & Adele B. Dilschneider | 1 mile | 1:38.63 | $168,150 | II | |
| 2011 | On Fire Baby | Joe M. Johnson | Gary G. Hartlage | Anita Cauley | 1 mile | 1:37.17 | $173,400 | II | |
| 2010 | Dancinginherdreams | Julien R. Leparoux | John T. Ward Jr. | John C. Oxley | 1 mile | 1:38.59 | $165,450 | II | |
| 2009 | Sassy Image | Robby Albarado | Dale L. Romans | Jerry Romans Jr. | 1 mile | 1:38.62 | $115,900 | III | |
| 2008 | Sara Louise | Robby Albarado | Dale L. Romans | Eldon Farm | 1 mile | 1:34.57 | $110,400 | III | |
| 2007 | Pure Clan | Julien R. Leparoux | Robert E. Holthus | Lewis G. Lakin | 1 mile | 1:38.30 | $185,700 | III | |
| 2006 | Change Up | Garrett K. Gomez | Steven B. Flint | Richard, Bertram & Elaine Klein | 1 mile | 1:35.97 | $114,300 | III | |
| 2005 | French Park | Mark Guidry | Helen Pitts-Blasi | Steve Stan Stables | 1 mile | 1:37.19 | $120,600 | III | |
| 2004 | Punch Appeal | Pat Day | Steven M. Asmussen | Heiligbrodt Racing & Burning Day Farm | 1 mile | 1:37.77 | $109,500 | Listed | |
| 2003 | Stellar Jayne | Cornelio Velásquez | D. Wayne Lukas | Spendthrift Farm, Chuck Kidder, Nancy Cole & Nick Strong | 1 mile | 1:38.97 | $112,300 | Listed | |
| 2002 | Belle of Perintown | Mark Guidry | Eddie Kenneally | Ken Mahler & Jamie Schloss | 1 mile | 1:36.52 | $111,100 | Listed | |
| 2001 | Lotta Rhythm | Marlon St. Julien | Hal R. Wiggins | Dolphus Morrison | 1 mile | 1:37.96 | $111,500 | Listed | |
| 2000 | Unbridled Elaine | Shane Sellers | Dallas Stewart | Roger J. Devenport | 1 mile | 1:34.82 | $113,000 | Listed | |
| 1999 | Crown of Crimson | Robby Albarado | Bob Baffert | Golden Eagle Farm | 1 mile | 1:37.81 | $112,600 | Listed | |
| 1998 | The Happy Hopper | Willie Martinez | Robert E. Holthus | Kerry & Linda Ozment | 1 mile | 1:37.73 | $113,300 | Listed | |
| 1997 | Mission Park | Calvin H. Borel | Peter M. Vestal | Willmott Stables | 1 mile | 1:38.55 | $113,600 | Listed | |
| 1996 | Water Street | Craig Perret | Peter M. Vestal | Willmott Stables | 1 mile | 1:36.90 | $112,800 | Listed | |
| 1995 | Birr | Pat Day | W. Elliott Walden | Prestonwood Farm | 1 mile | 1:36.84 | $113,200 | Listed | |
| 1994 | Minister Wife | Pat Day | D. Wayne Lukas | Fares Farm | 1 mile | 1:38.64 | $112,900 | Listed | |
| 1993 | At the Half | Shane Sellers | Carl Bowman | Wayne G. Lyster, III | 1 mile | 1:38.13 | $116,400 | Listed | |
| 1992 | Coni Bug | Shane Sellers | Anthony J. Granitz | Wheeler Farm | 1 mile | 1:37.85 | $84,150 | Listed | |
| 1991 | Fretina | James Edward Bruin | Peter M. Vestal | Peter S. Willmott | 1 mile | 1:40.25 | $85,350 | Listed | |
| 1990 | Middlefork Rapids | Roberto M. Gonzalez | Terry Knight | Dame Construction Company | 1 mile | 1:38.00 | $58,000 | | |
| 1989 | Crowned | Mike E. Smith | William I. Mott | Bohemia Stable | 1 mile | 1:39.80 | $55,400 | | |
| 1988 | § Solid Eight | Randy Romero | D. Wayne Lukas | D. Wayne Lukas & Paternostro | 1 mile | 1:40.60 | $55,800 | | |
| 1987 | Epitome | Pat Day | Philip M. Hauswald | John A. Bell III | 1 mile | 1:38.20 | $53,775 | | |
| 1986 | Bestofbothworlds | Patricia Cooksey | Irvin Jack | Judy Owens | 1 mile | 1:42.60 | $54,345 | | |
| 1985 | Prime Union | Darrell Ellis Foster | Thomas M. Upton | John McGarrah | 1 mile | 1:38.40 | $43,050 | | |
| 1984 | Gallant Libby | Pat Day | Mickey A. Goldfine | Arthur I. Appleton | 1 mile | 1:41.80 | $30,650 | | |
| 1983 | Geevilla | Pat Day | William I. Mott | J. C. Clements | 1 mile | 1:40.20 | $28,687 | | Division 1 |
| 1983 | Flippers | Pat Day | Steven C. Penrod | Claiborne Farm | 1 mile | 1:39.80 | $30,187 | | Division 2 |
| 1982 | Brindy Brindy | Julio C. Espinoza | Jack Van Berg | Wajima Farm | 1 mile | 1:38.20 | $29,375 | | Division 1 |
| 1982 | Weekend Surprise | Don Brumfield | Del W. Carroll II | William S. Farish III & William S. Kilroy | 1 mile | 1:37.80 | $29,750 | | Division 2 |
| 1981 | Majestic Gold | Julio C. Espinoza | William E. Adams | Frederick Lehmann | 7 furlongs | 1:26.80 | $31,075 | | Division 1 |
| 1981 | Taylor Park | James McKnight | Stanley M. Rieser | Indian Creek Farm | 7 furlongs | 1:26.40 | $31,700 | | Division 2 |
| 1980 | Kathy T. | Larry Melancon | Doug Udouj | Mrs. Carl Udouj | 7 furlongs | 1:27.60 | $28,800 | | Division 1 |
| 1980 | Masters Dream | Gerland Gallitano | William E. Adams | Golden Chance Farm (Robert & Verna Lehmann) | 7 furlongs | 1:27.40 | $30,925 | | Division 2 |
| 1979 | Dancing Blade | Anthony Black | Hoss Inman | Sunrise Farm & Hoss Inman | 7 furlongs | 1:26.80 | $26,150 | | |
| 1978 | Starclock | Richard Depass | Charles R. Werstler | Mary V. Fisher | 7 furlongs | 1:25.40 | $22,800 | | Division 1 |
| 1978 | Safe | Earlie Fires | Joseph M. Bollero | Elizabeth Brisbine | 7 furlongs | 1:25.60 | $23,050 | | Division 2 |
| 1977 | Plains and Simple | Alexander L. Fernandez | John T. Ward Jr. | Cornelius Vanderbilt Whitney | 7 furlongs | 1:25.20 | $22,938 | | † Division 1 |
| 1977 | Rainy Princess | Larry Snyder | Frank L. Brothers | W. H. Snyder | 7 furlongs | 1:25.20 | $22,938 | | † Division 2 |
| 1976 | Sweet Alliance | Chris McCarron | Bud Delp | Windfields Farm | 7 furlongs | 1:25.60 | $22,538 | | † Division 1 |
| 1976 | Ciao | William Gavidia | Alice Chandler | Mill Ridge Farm | 7 furlongs | 1:27.00 | $22,788 | | † Division 2 |
| 1975 | Alvarada | Don Brumfield | Don Combs | Thomas McKinley & Alex Parker | 7 furlongs | 1:27.60 | $24,525 | | |
| 1974 | My Juliet | Alan Hill | Steve A. Long | George Weasel | 7 furlongs | 1:23.60 | $24,525 | | |
| 1973 | Fairway Fable | David Whited | John J. Greely III | William Floyd | 7 furlongs | 1:26.00 | $23,550 | | † Division 1 |
| 1973 | § Shoo Dear | Donald Brumfield | George T. Poole | Cornelius Vanderbilt Whitney | 7 furlongs | 1:27.80 | $23,550 | | † Division 2 |
| 1972 | Vaguely Familiar | German Vasquez | Mickey Goldfine | Arthur I. Appleton | 7 furlongs | 1:25.80 | $25,100 | | |
| 1971 | Candid Catherine | Earl J. Knapp | Everett W. King | Mrs. Lloyd I. Miller | 7 furlongs | 1:25.80 | $24,125 | | |
| 1970 | Fair Ye Well | David Niblick | Harvey L. Vanier | Dr. Louis F. Aitken | 7 furlongs | 1:22.40 | $22,550 | | |
| 1969 | Artists Proof | Doug Richard | Del W. Carroll | Michael G. Phipps | 7 furlongs | 1:24.20 | $23,825 | | |

Notes:
† Divisions of the event in 1973, 1976 and 1977 were run on different days
§ Ran as part of an entry

== See also ==
- Road to the Kentucky Oaks
- List of American and Canadian Graded races
