= Carl Hanford =

American racehorse trainer

Personal information
- Born: March 12, 1916 Fairbury, Nebraska, USA
- Died: August 14, 2011 (aged 95) Wilmington, Delaware, USA
- Resting place: All Saints Cemetery; Wilmington, Delaware
- Occupation: Jockey / Trainer

Horse racing career
- Sport: Horse racing

Major racing wins
- Pimlico Breeders' Stakes (1951); Gallorette Handicap (1952); Monmouth Oaks (1952); Comely Stakes (1953); Ladies Handicap (1953); Discovery Handicap (1960); Jerome Handicap (1960); Lawrence Realization Stakes (1960); Hawthorne Gold Cup Handicap (1960); Jockey Club Gold Cup (1960, 1961, 1962, 1963, 1964); Brooklyn Handicap (1961); Metropolitan Handicap (1961); Suburban Handicap (1961, 1963); Woodward Stakes (1961, 1962, 1963); Whitney Stakes (1961, 1963, 1965); Aqueduct Handicap (1963, 1964); Gulfstream Park Handicap (1963); John B. Campbell Handicap (1963); Nassau County Handicap (1963); Washington, D.C. International Stakes (1964); Test Stakes (1965); Schuylerville Stakes (1967)

Honours
- National Museum of Racing and Hall of Fame (2006)

Significant horses
- Kelso, La Corredora

Carl Henry Hanford (March 12, 1916 - August 14, 2011) was a United States Hall of Fame trainer of Thoroughbred racehorses best known for guiding Kelso to five straight American Horse of the Year titles; no other horse has won more than three times.

Hanford's training career was interrupted when he served five years in the United States Army Remount Service during World War II.

Carl Hanford also notably trained La Corredora, a racemare voted the Champion Handicap Mare of 1953 by the New York Turf Writers Association.

In 1999 Carl Hanford was inducted into the Delaware Sports Hall of Fame.

Ira Hanford was a brother of Carl who in 1936 became the first apprentice jockey to ever win the Kentucky Derby.
