= Gallorette Stakes =

- Class: Grade III
- Location: Pimlico Race Course, Baltimore, Maryland, United States
- Inaugurated: 1952
- Race type: Thoroughbred – Flat racing
- Website: www.preakness.com

Race information
- Distance: 1 1/16 miles (8.5 furlongs)
- Surface: Turf
- Track: Left-handed
- Qualification: Three-year-old and up fillies and Mares
- Weight: assigned
- Purse: $150,000

The Gallorette Stakes is a Grade III American Thoroughbred horse race for fillies and mares age three and older over a distance of 1 1/16 miles (8.5 furlongs) on the turf, run annually on Preakness Day at Pimlico Race Course in Baltimore, Maryland. The event offers a purse of $150,000 added.

== History ==
The race was first carded in its inaugural running in 1952. It became graded for the first time in 1973.

The race is part of a series of stakes races named for famous Marylanders, in this case: Gallorette, one of the great racing fillies in American history. Named for Mrs. M. A. Moore's 1946 and 1947 Champion Handicap Female. Gallorete was famous for beating the males of her day in a number of races. Gallorette also won the 1945 Pimlico Oaks (the sister race to the Preakness Stakes) which was renamed later to the Black-Eyed Susan Stakes. Gallorette's own daughter, Mlle. Lorette, won this race in 1954.

The Gallorette Handicap's stakes record is 1:39.73 held by Miz Money who won the race in 2016.

The Gallorette was run on dirt between 1952-through-1972, in 1979 and 1980, 1984, 1986 and 1987 as well as 1995 and 1996.

== Records ==
Speed record:

- 1 1/16 miles – 1:40.32 – Precious Kitten (2007)
- 1 1/8 miles – 1:50.20 – Mlle. Lorette (1954)

Most wins by a horse:

- 2 – Searching (1955 & 1956)
- 2 – Gold Digger (1965 & 1966)

Most wins by a jockey:

- 3 – Craig Perret (1979, 1983 & 1988)
- 3 – Jerry Bailey (1993, 2004 & 2005)
- 3 – Edgar Prado (1991, 1992 & 1999)
- 4 – Javier Castellano (2006, 2012, 2015, 2016)

Most wins by a trainer:

- 6 – Chad Brown (2012, 2013 & 2015, 2022, 2023, 2024)

Most wins by an owner:

- 3 – Ethel D. Jacobs (1955, 1956 & 1960)

== Winners of the Gallorette Stakes since 1952 ==
Year	Winner	Age	Jockey	Trainer	Owner	Distance	Time	Purse	Grade
2026	Warming	4	John R. Velazquez	H. Graham Motion	Eclipse Thoroughbred Partners	1-1/16	1:41.10	$150,000	III
2025	Charlene’s Dream	4	Umberto Rispoli	Ed Moger Jr.	Domeyko Taylor LP	1-1/16	1:46.92	$150,000	III
2024	Fluffy Socks	6	Irad Ortiz Jr.	Chad C. Brown	Head Of Plains Partners	1-1/16	1:49.79	$150,000	III
2023	Whitebeam (GB)	4	Irad Ortiz Jr.	Chad C. Brown	Juddmonte Farm	1-1/16	1:41.67	$150,000	III
2022	Technical Analysis	4	José Ortiz	Chad C. Brown	Klaravich Stables	1-1/16	1:41.40	$150,000	III
2021	Mean Mary	5	Luis Saez	H. Graham motion	Alex G. Campbell, Jr.	1-1/16	1:43.10	$150,000	III
2020	Juliet Foxtrot	5	Florent Geroux	Brad H. Cox	Juddmonte Farms, Inc	1-1/16	1:49.24	$150,000	III
2019	Mitchell Road	4	Joel Rosario	William Mott	Mrs. J. Shields & E. McFadden	1-1/16	1:41.21	$150,000	III
2018	Ultra Brat	5	José Ortiz	H. Graham Motion	Alex Campbell Jr.	1-1/16	1:53.72	$150,000	III
2017	Cambodia	5	Florent Geroux	Thomas F. Proctor	Winter Quarter Farm	1-1/16	1:44.35	$150,000	III
2016	Mizz Money	4	Javier Castellano	Bernard S. Flint	L. T. B./Hillerich Racing	1-1/16	1:45.93	$150,000	III
2015	Watsdachances	5	Javier Castellano	Chad Brown	Bradley Thoroughbreds/M.Kisber	1-1/16	1:40.79	$150,000	III
2014	Somali Lemonade	5	Luis Saez	Michael R. Matz	Caroline A. Forgason	1-1/16	1:44.16	$150,000	III
2013	Pianist	4	Mike Smith	Chad Brown	Hidden Brook Farm	1-1/16	1:40.60	$150,000	III
2012	Zagora	5	Javier Castellano	Chad Brown	Martin Schwartz	1-1/16	1:41.73	$150,000	III
2011	No Explaining	4	John Velazquez	Roger Attfield	Harlequin Ranches	1-1/16	1:46.65	$100,000	III
2010	Rainbow View	4	Julien Leparoux	Jonathan Sheppard	Augustin Stable	1-1/16	1:41.04	$100,000	III
2009	Social Queen	5	Rafael Bejarano	Alan E. Goldberg	Jayeff B Stables	1-1/16	1:41.84	$100,000	III
2008	Roshani	5	John Velazquez	Todd A. Pletcher	Ben McElroy	1-1/16	1:49.08	$100,000	III
2007	Precious Kitten	4	Rafael Bejarano	Robert J. Frankel	Ken & Sarah Ramsey	1-1/16	1:40.32	$100,000	III
2006	Ozone Bere	4	Javier Castellano	Christophe Clement	Jean-Claude Seroul	1-1/16	1:42.08	$100,000	III
2005	Film Maker	5	Jerry Bailey	H. Graham Motion	Courtlandt Farms	1-1/16	1:44.29	$100,000	III
2004	Ocean Drive	5	Jerry Bailey	Todd A. Pletcher	Bonnie & Sy Baskin	1-1/16	1:40.85	$100,000	III
2003	Carib Lady	5	Patrick Valenzuela	Todd A. Pletcher	Gaillardia Stables	1-1/16	1:50.69	$100,000	III
2002	Quidnaskra	7	Chris McCarron	Mary E. Eppler	K.A.T. Bloodstock	1-1/16	1:46.73	$100,000	III
2001	License Fee	6	Pat Day	W. Elliott Walden	Winstar Farm	1-1/16	1:42.81	$100,000	III
2000	Colstar	4	Alberto Delgado	Paul R. Fout	Beverly Steinman	1-1/16	1:43.60	$100,000	III
1999	Winfama	6	Edgar Prado	Martin D. Wolfson	Santa Cruz Ranch	1-1/16	1:43.31	$100,000	III
1998	Tresoriere	4	José A. Santos	Pascal Bary	Stephan Friborg	1-1/16	1:45.35	$100,000	III
1997	Palliser Bay	5	Carlos H. Marquez Jr.	Ronald C. Cartwright	Arthur I. Appleton	1-1/16	1:43.81	$100,000	III
1996	Aucilla	5	Mike E. Smith	Allen Jerkens	Overbrook Farm	1-1/16	1:44.96	$100,000	III
1995	It's Personal	5	Julie Krone	Michael Dickinson	Prestonwood Farm	1-1/16	1:43.72	$100,000	III
1994	Tribulation	4	Jean-Luc Samyn	James J. Toner	Joan & John Phillips	1-1/16	1:41.66	$100,000	III
1993	You'd Be Surprised	4	Jerry Bailey	MacKenzie Miller	Rokeby Stables	1-1/16	1:43.54	$100,000	III
1992	Brilliant Brass	5	Edgar Prado	Carlos A. Garcia	Elaine L. Bassford	1-1/16	1:44.81	$100,000	III
1991	Miss Josh	5	Edgar Prado	Barclay Tagg	Bonner Farm	1-1/16	1:41.91	$100,000	III
1990	Highland Penny	5	Raul I. Rojas	Susan H. Duncan	Ravenbrook Farm	1-1/16	1:42.40	$100,000	III
1989	Dance Teacher	4	Jean-Luc Samyn	Philip G. Johnson	Edward P. Evans	1-1/16	1:44.00	$100,000	III
1988	Just Class	5	Craig Perret	Alan E. Goldberg	Robert Masterson	1-1/16	1:42.80	$91,000	III
1987	Scotch Heather	5	Mario Pino	Jack Mobberley	William M. Backer	1-1/16	1:44.40	$91,000	III
1986	Natania	5	James W. Edwards	Bill Curtis Jr.	Spendthrift Farm	1-1/16	1:45.60	$119,200	III
1985	La Reine Elaine	4	Greg Hutton	James J. Toner	Windfields Farm	1-1/16	1:41.60	$119,200	III
1984	Kattegat's Pride	5	Donnie A. Miller Jr.	Cam Gambolati	Stephen Quick	1-1/16	1:42.80	$96,700	III
1983	Wedding Party	4	Craig Perret	Charles Hadry	Stuart S. Janney Jr.	1-1/16	1:50.00	$95,250	III
1982	Island Charm	5	Nick Santagata	Stephen A. DiMauro	David A. McKibbin	1-1/16	1:46.40	$95,250	III
1981	Exactly So	4	Greg McCarron	Stanley M. Hough	Robert G. Kluener	1-1/16	1:47.20	$93,325	III
1980	Jamila Kadir	5	Mario Pino	Thomas E. Field	Mrs. Samuel E. Bogley	1-1/16	1:44.40	$95,725	III
1979	Calderina	4	Craig Perret	P. Noel Hickey	John Jones	1-1/16	1:44.80	$94,790	III
1978	Huggle Duggle	4	Bernie Gonzalez	Dick Fischer	Spendthrift Farm	1-1/16	1:44.20	$63,000	III
1977	Summertime Promise	5	Leroy Moyers	Charles E. Whittingham	Mary Jones Bradley	1-1/16	1:43.60	$63,000	III
†1976	Redundancy	5	Ray Broussard	Richard Root	Hobson Stable	1-1/16	1:42.20	$50,000	III
†1976	Deesse du Val	5	Carlos H. Marquez Sr.	H. Allen Jerkens	Mrs. Joan Johnson	1-1/16	1:42.20	$50,000	III
1975	Gulls Cry	4	Eddie Maple	John M. Gaver Sr.	Mrs. Taylor Hardin	1-1/16	1:46.20	$63,250	III
1974	Sarre Green	4	Tommy Lee	Jack Mobberley	Gretchen C. Mobberley	1-1/16	1:44.60	$37,000	III
1973	Deb Marion	3	Anthony Agnello	Johnny Rigione	George H. Schmidt	1-1/16	1:44.00	$36,600	III
1972	Sun Colony	4	Carlos Jimenez	John P. Campo	Buckland Farm	1-1/16	1:45.00	$36,600	
1971	Cold Comfort	4	Mike Venezia	William J. Hirsch	King Ranch	1-1/16	1:43.40	$36,000	
1970	Singing Rain	5	Frank Lovato Sr.	Don Combs	Walter M. Jeffords Jr.	1-1/16	1:43.60	$36,000	
1969	Back in Paris	5	Chuck Baltazar	J. Bowes Bond	Elberon Farm	1-1/16	1:42.80	$36,600	
1968	Serene Queen	4	Frank Lovato Sr.	John A. Nerud	Thomas J. Diphilla	1-1/16	1:44.80	$36,600	
1967	Lady Diplomat	4	Fernando Toro	J. H. Hares	Leonard P. Sasso	1-1/16	1:42.60	$36,600	
1966	Gold Digger	4	Billy Phelps	E. Jouett Reed	Mrs. Leslie Combs II	1-1/8	1:51.20	$36,600	
1965	Gold Digger	3	Larry Adams	E. Jouett Reed	Mrs. Leslie Combs II	1-1/8	1:53.20	$35,000	
1964	Gay Serenade	4	Fernando Alvarez	Edward A. Christmas	Mrs. Taylor Hardin	1-1/8	1:51.20	$32,500	
1963	Double Heritage	4	Tommy Lee	Tonio Simon	Charles E. Reithmeyer	1-1/8	1:52.60	$33,600	
1962	Waltz Song	4	Sheridan Mellon	Thomas F. White	Thomas F. White	1-1/8	1:52.00	$32,500	
1961	Barnesville Miss	3	Pete Anderson	Albert Zittle	Mrs. Henry H. Hecht	1-1/8	1:53.80	$20,000	
1960	Sister Antoine	3	Raymond York	Hirsch Jacobs	Ethel D. Jacobs	1-1/8	1:52.80	$20,000	
1959	High Bid	3	Henry Moreno	James Fitzsimmons	Wheatley Stable	1-1/8	1:51.00	$20,000	
1958	Hoosier Honey	4	John Ruane	Ray E. Vogelman Jr.	Roy R. Hunt	1-1/8	1:52.40	$23,000	
1957	Searching	5	David Erb	Hirsch Jacobs	Ethel D. Jacobs	1-1/8	1:51.20	$16,250	
1956	Little Pache	3	Arnold Kirkland	Frank E. Cundall	Ellis Farm	1-1/8	1:52.40	$16,250	
1955	Searching	3	David Erb	Hirsch Jacobs	Ethel D. Jacobs	1-1/8	1:53.60	$18,250	
1954	Mlle. Lorette	4	Augustine Catalano	Sid Culver	Marie A. Moore	1-1/8	1:50.20	$19,800	
1953	Sabette	3	Jesse Higley	James Fitzsimmons	Belair Stud	1-1/8	1:51.60	$18,250	
1952	La Corredora	3	Ira Hanford	Carl Hanford	Marian W. O'Connor	1-1/8	1:52.40	$33,700	

Notes:

- † Run in divisions in 1976

== See also ==
- Gallorette Handicap top three finishers
- Preakness Stakes
- Black-Eyed Susan Stakes
- Pimlico Race Course
- List of graded stakes at Pimlico Race Course
