= Pure Clan =

American-bred Thoroughbred racehorse

- Sire: Pure Prize
- Grandsire: Storm Cat
- Dam: Gather The Clan
- Damsire: General Assembly
- Sex: Filly
- Foaled: March 9, 2005
- Country: United States
- Colour: Chestnut
- Breeder: A. Lakin & Sons, Inc.
- Owner: Lewis G. Lakin
- Trainer: Robert E. Holthus
- Record: 16: 8-4-3
- Earnings: US$1,987,498

Major wins
- Flower Bowl Invitational Stakes (2009); Modesty Handicap (2009); Regret Stakes (2008)); American Oaks Invitational Stakes (2008); Golden Rod Stakes (2007)); Pocahontas Stakes (2007)

Pure Clan (foaled March 9, 2005 in Kentucky) is a retired American Thoroughbred racehorse. She won eight races and nearly $2 million in her two-year racing career, participating in races on dirt and turf tracks in the United States and the United Arab Emirates. She was retired in 2010 to be a broodmare and has produced two foals to date. Pure Clan was sold in late 2012 for $4.5 million and currently resides at Three Chimneys Farm in Kentucky.

== Background ==
Pure Clan is a daughter of the British-bred Pure Prize, winner of the Kentucky Cup Classic Handicap and sire of over 40 graded stakes winners. Her dam, Gather The Clan, was sired by General Assembly and won the 1989 Violet Handicap. She also produced the stakes winner Greater Good (Kentucky Jockey Club Stakes, Rebel Stakes) and is the grandam of Sky Diva (Frizette Stakes) and Quick Little Miss (Debutante Stakes).

== Racing career ==
Pure Clan won 8 out of 16 starts, including the Flower Bowl Invitational Stakes and the American Oaks Invitational Stakes. She ran second to Midday in the Breeders' Cup Filly & Mare Turf.

Pure Clan sustained a bruise to her left front foot in May 2010 as she was preparing for her first race at Churchill Downs and was sent to Rood & Riddle Equine Hospital for further testing. She returned to training in July 2010, but was ultimately retired from racing in August 2010 due to "economic reasons" and sold to an anonymous buyer.

== Breeding career ==
In her first season as a broodmare, she was bred to Smart Strike and produced the filly Native Strike in 2012. She was bred to Bernardini in February 2012 and was later sold for $4.5 million at the 2012 Keeneland November bloodstock sale in Lexington. Purchased by Goncalo Torrealba of Stud TNT, she was stabled at Three Chimneys Farm in Midway. She foaled a filly by Bernardini there in January 2013 and produced a colt sired by Tapit in 2015. Her 2015 filly was sired by Tiznow.
