= One Dreamer (horse) =

American-bred Thoroughbred racehorse

- Sire: Relaunch
- Grandsire: In Reality
- Dam: Creatively
- Damsire: Pretense
- Sex: Filly
- Foaled: May 4, 1988; Florida
- Died: 2005 (exact date unknown)
- Country: United States
- Colour: Gray
- Breeder: Glen Hill Farm
- Owner: Glen Hill Farm
- Trainer: Thomas F. Proctor
- Record: 25: 12-6-2
- Earnings: US$1,266,067

Major wins
- Aqueduct Breeders' Cup Handicap (1993); Louisville Breeders' Cup Handicap (1994); Breeders' Cup Distaff (1994)

Honours
- One Dreamer Stakes (Gulfstream Park, 2001–2002) (Kentucky Downs, since 2015)

One Dreamer (May 4, 1988 – 2005) was an American Thoroughbred racehorse, best known for winning the 1994 Breeders' Cup Distaff.

== Background ==
One Dreamer was bred and raced by the Glen Hill Farm of Ocala, Florida, owned by Leonard H. Lavin, the founding owner of Alberto-Culver beauty-care products company. The filly was trained by Tom Proctor.

== Racing career ==
One Dreamer did not race at age two and finished off the board in her one start at age three. During the next three years of racing, though, she made eight starts annually and won four each time.

Her six-year-old campaign in 1994 culminated with the most important win of her career when she won the Breeders' Cup Distaff at odds of 47–1, defeating a strong field that included Heavenly Prize, Hollywood Wildcat, and Sky Beauty.

=== Record ===
Date	Race Type	Track	Finish
3-year old
6/8/1991	Maiden Special Weight	Hollywood Park	4th
4-year old
1/25/1992	Maiden Special Weight	Santa Anita	2nd
3/13/1992	Maiden Special Weight	Santa Anita	1st
4/4/1992	Allowance	Santa Anita	2nd
4/24/1992	Allowance	Santa Anita	3rd
5/20/1992	Allowance	Arlington	1st
6/20/1992	Allowance	Arlington	1st
7/29/1992	Allowance	Arlington	1st
8/23/1992	Cleopatra Stakes	Arlington	5th
5-year old
6/12/1993	Allowance	Arlington	2nd
6/28/1993	Allowance	Arlington	1st
7/21/1993	Allowance	Arlington	2nd
8/7/1993	Arlington Budweiser Breeders' Cup Handicap	Arlington	1st
8/29/1993	Hanshin Handicap	Arlington	4th
9/26/1993	Rachel Jackson Stakes	Dueling Grounds	1st
10/23/1993	Aqueduct Budweiser Breeders' Cup Handicap	Aqueduct	1st
11/13/1993	Churchill Downs Budweiser Breeders' Cup Handicap	Churchill Downs	2nd
6-year old
4/2/1994	Miami Beach Stakes	Hialeah Park	7th
5/6/1994	Louisville Budweiser Breeders' Cup Handicap	Churchill Downs	1st
6/5/1994	Modesty Handicap	Arlington	2nd
7/10/1994	Office Wife Stakes	Arlington	1st
8/6/1994	Arlington Budweiser Breeders' Cup Handicap	Arlington	1st
8/27/1994	Beverly D. Stakes	Arlington	4th
9/24/1994	Rachel Jackson Stakes	Dueling Grounds	3rd
11/5/1994	Breeders' Cup Distaff	Churchill Downs	1st

== Breeding record ==
Retired to broodmare duty at her owner's Glen Hill farm, One Dreamer produced seven foals from notable sires, such as Storm Cat and Unbridled, but had limited success in racing. She died around 2005.
