= Bourbon Stakes =

- Class: Grade II
- Location: Keeneland Race Course; Lexington, Kentucky, United States
- Inaugurated: 1991 (as Hopemont Stakes)
- Race type: Thoroughbred – Flat racing
- Sponsor: Castle & Key (since 2022)
- Website: Keeneland

Race information
- Distance: 1 1/16 miles
- Surface: Turf
- Track: Left-handed
- Qualification: Two-year-olds
- Weight: 122 lbs with allowances
- Purse: $400,000 (2025)
- Bonuses: Win and You're In Breeders' Cup Juvenile Turf

The Bourbon Stakes is a Grade II American thoroughbred horse race for two-year-olds over a distance of 1 1/16 miles on the turf held annually in early October at Keeneland Race Course in Lexington, Kentucky during the fall meeting.

== History ==
The event was inaugurated on 23 October 1991 as the Hopemont Stakes and was won by the short priced 1-2 favorite Stress Buster who was ridden by US Hall of Fame jockey Pat Day in a time of 1:44.84. The name of the event was in honor of the Hunt–Morgan House, historically known as Hopemont located in Lexington.

The event was run in two divisions in 1998.

In 2003 the event was renamed to the Bourbon County Stakes – Bourbon County is near Lexington and is home to many famous Throroughbred farms.

From 2005 to 2008, the event was run as the Bourbon Stakes, with sponsorship from Woodford Reserve which reflected in the name of the race. From 2014 until 2019 the race was sponsored by Dixiana Farm.

In 2006, 2013 and 2017, the race was switched from turf to the main track due to weather conditions.

In 2008 the event was classified as Grade III and in 2020 was upgraded to Grade II. The race is part of the Breeders' Cup Challenge series. The winner of the Bourbon Stakes receives a "Win and You're In" berth in the Breeders' Cup Juvenile Turf.

== Records ==
Speed record:

- 1:41.27 – Andthewinneris (2022)

Margins

- 11 1/4 lengths – Stage Call (IRE) (2001)

Most wins by an owner

- 3 – John C. Oxley (2000, 2015, 2017)

Most wins by a jockey

- 4 – Julien Leparoux (2010, 2012, 2015, 2017)

Most wins by a trainer

- 6 – Todd A. Pletcher (2006, 2008, 2009, 2018, 2020, 2025)

== Winners ==
Year	Winner	Jockey	Trainer	Owner	Distance	Time	Purse	Grade	Ref
Bourbon Stakes
2026	Agate	Tyler Gaffalione	Kelsey Danner	Dede McGehee	1 1/16 miles	1:42.64	$400,000	II	
2025	Final Score	Irad Ortiz Jr.	Todd A. Pletcher	Repole Stable	1 1/16 miles	1:42.51	$400,000	II	
2024	Minaret Station	Cristian Torres	William Walden	OXO Equine	1 1/16 miles	1:42.28	$347,719	II	
2023	Can Group	Francisco Arrieta	Mark E. Casse	D. J. Stable & Cash is King	1 1/16 miles	1:43.73	$350,000	II	
2022	Andthewinneris	Flavien Prat	Wayne M. Catalano	Susan Moulton	1 1/16 miles	1:41.27	$348,125	II	
2021	Tiz the Bomb	Brian Hernandez Jr.	Kenneth G. McPeek	Phoenix Thoroughbred III	1 1/16 miles	1:43.69	$200,000	II	
2020	Mutasaabeq	Luis Saez	Todd A. Pletcher	Shadwell Stable	1 1/16 miles	1:43.13	$200,000	II	
2019	Peace Achieved	Miguel Mena	Mark E. Casse	JSM Equine	1 1/16 miles	1:43.06	$250,000	III	
2018	Current	Jose L. Ortiz	Todd A. Pletcher	Eclipse Thoroughbred Partners & Robert V. LaPenta	1 1/16 miles	1:45.10	$250,000	III	
2017	Flameaway	Julien R. Leparoux	Mark E. Casse	John C. Oxley	1 1/16 miles	1:45.77	$250,000	III	
2016	Keep Quiet (FR)	Florent Geroux	Mark E. Casse	Gary Barber	1 1/16 miles	1:44.92	$250,000	III	
2015	Airoforce	Julien R. Leparoux	Mark E. Casse	John C. Oxley	1 1/16 miles	1:44.12	$250,000	III	
2014	Lawn Ranger	Chris Landeros	Kenneth G. McPeek	Turf Stable Racing	1 1/16 miles	1:44.41	$250,000	III	
2013	Poker Player	Channing Hill	Wayne M. Catalano	Gary and Mary West	1 1/16 miles	1:43.46	$150,000	III	
2012	Balance the Books	Julien R. Leparoux	Chad C. Brown	Klaravich Stables & William H. Lawrence	1 1/16 miles	1:45.15	$150,000	III	
2011	Animal Spirits	Robby Albarado	Albert Stall Jr.	Klaravich Stables & William H. Lawrence	1 1/16 miles	1:44.24	$150,000	III	
2010	Rogue Romance	Julien R. Leparoux	Kenneth G. McPeek	Catesby W. Clay	1 1/16 miles	1:43.76	$100,000	III	
2009	Interactif	Kent J. Desormeaux	Todd A. Pletcher	Wertheimer et Frère	1 1/16 miles	1:45.24	$125,000	III	
2008	Bittel Road	Rajiv Maragh	Todd A. Pletcher	James T. Scatuorchio & John Iracane	1 1/16 miles	1:44.29	$200,000	III	
2007	Gio Ponti	Ramon A. Dominguez	Christophe Clement	Castleton Lyons	1 1/16 miles	1:45.92	$150,000	Listed	
2006	Twilight Meteor	John R. Velazquez	Todd A. Pletcher	Peachtree Stable	1 1/16 miles	1:43.25	$125,000	Listed	
2005	Yankee Master	Rafael Bejarano	Linda L. Rice	Team Power Play Racing	1 1/16 miles	1:43.85	$125,000	Listed	
Bourbon County Stakes
2004	Rey de Cafe	Craig Perret	George R. Arnold II	G. Watts Humphrey Jr.	1 1/16 miles	1:42.90	$112,200	Listed	
2003	Commendation	Cornelio Velasquez	H. Graham Motion	Courtlandt Farm	1 1/16 miles	1:43.99	$112,800	Listed	
Hopemont Stakes
2002	Rapid Proof	Calvin H. Borel	Hal R. Wiggins	Dolphus C. Morrison	1 1/16 miles	1:46.45	$115,000	Listed	
2001	Stage Call (IRE)	Mark Guidry	W. Elliott Walden	WinStar Farm, Richard Nip & Gloria Gaines Callum	1 1/16 miles	1:45.85	$111,800	Listed	
2000	Overview	Mike E. Smith	John T. Ward Jr.	John C. Oxley	1 1/16 miles	1:43.02	$81,775	Listed	
1999	Gateman (GB)	Pat Day	W. Elliott Walden	Kennet Valley Thoroughbreds	1 1/16 miles	1:42.42	$70,175	Listed	
1998	Pineaff	Pat Day	Kenneth G. McPeek	Joyce & Roy K. Monroe	1 1/16 miles	1:44.63	$70,100	Listed	Division 1
1998	Bold Caleb	Robby Albarado	Hal R. Wiggins	Ann & Charles Patterson	1 1/16 miles	1:44.73	$70,850	Listed	Division 2
1997	Reformer Rally	Craig Perret	Peter M. Vestal	Thomas M. Carey	1 1/16 miles	1:46.91	$67,750	Listed	
1996	Thesaurus	Craig Perret	Peter M. Vestal	Charles J. Cella	1 1/16 miles	1:44.49	$55,000	Listed	
1995	Red Shadow	Willie Martinez	Patrick B. Byrne	Prestonwood Farm	1 1/16 miles	1:46.71	$54,960	Listed	
1994	Claudius	John R. Velazquez	William I. Mott	Darley Racing	1 1/16 miles	1:45.50	$53,000		
1993	Star of Manila	Shane Sellers	Burk Kessinger Jr.	New Phoenix Stable	1 1/16 miles	1:43.34	$49,000		
1992	The Real Vaslav	Shane Sellers	D. Wayne Lukas	Gonzalo B. Torrealba	1 1/16 miles	1:46.01	$45,500		
1991	Stress Buster	Pat Day	Joseph H. Pierce Jr.	G. Watts Humphrey Jr. & Sheila Pierce	1 1/16 miles	1:44.84	$44,100		

Legend:
Turf All Weather Track Dirt

== See also ==
- List of American and Canadian Graded races
