= Regret Stakes =

- Class: Grade III
- Location: Churchill Downs; Louisville, Kentucky, United States
- Inaugurated: 1970
- Race type: Thoroughbred - Flat racing
- Website: Churchill Downs

Race information
- Distance: 1 1/8 miles (9 furlongs)
- Surface: Turf
- Track: Left-handed
- Qualification: Three-year-old fillies
- Weight: 123lbs with allowances
- Purse: $275,000 (since 2024)

The Regret Stakes is a Grade III American Thoroughbred horse race for three-year-old fillies over a distance of one and one-eighth miles (9 furlongs) on the Turf scheduled annually in mid-June near the end of the Spring Meet at Churchill Downs in Louisville, Kentucky. The event offers a purse of $275,000.

== History ==
The race is named for Harry Payne Whitney's champion filly Regret, the first filly to win the 1915 Kentucky Derby. In the Blood-Horse magazine ranking of the top 100 U.S. thoroughbred champions of the 20th century, she is #71 and in a poll among members of the American Trainers Association, she was voted the third greatest filly in American racing history. Regret was undefeated as a two-year-old, she made her three-year-old debut in the Derby, winning in wire-to-wire fashion.

The race was inaugural running on 16 May 1970 and was run over a distance of 6 furlongs and won by Tree Pigeons ridden by veteran jockey Tommy Barrows in a fast time of 1:10 4/5. The Regret Stakes was run at six furlongs for its first twelve runnings (1970–1981). From 1982 to 1987 the race was run at a distance of one mile and from 1988 to 2002 it was run at 1 1/16 miles. From 2003 to present it has been run at its current distance of 1 1/8 miles.

The event was classified a Grade III event for the first time in 1999.

The event has been run in division four times - in 1974, 1976, 1980 and 1982.

== Records ==
Speed record:

- 1 1/8 miles – 1:46.23 - Faithful Departed (2026)
- 1 1/16 miles – 1:42.14 - Packet (1994)

Margins:

- 7 lengths – Amazing Love (1982)
- 7 lengths – Red Cross (1975)

Most wins by a jockey

- 4 - Julien Leparoux (2006, 2008, 2015, 2022)

Most wins by a trainer

- 4 - William I. Mott (1984, 1986, 1991, 2020)

Most wins by an owner

- 2 - Leslie Combs II (1971, 1977)
- 2 - Golden Chance Farm (1974, 1976)
- 2 - Hiram Polk, Jr. (1984, 1991)

== Winners ==
Year	Winner	Jockey	Trainer	Owner	Distance	Time	Purse	Grade	Ref
2026	Faithful Departed	Jose Ortiz	Grant Forster	Frank Ferrogine, Richard Rendina, Nick Coniglio & Greywood Farms	1 1/8 miles	1:46.23	$272,500	III	
2025	Fionn	Florent Geroux	Brad Cox	Michael Lee, George Messina	1 1/8 miles	1:47.29	$272,500	III	
2024	Pin Up Betty	Luis Saez	Michael J. Maker	Three Diamonds Farm	1 1/8 miles	1:50.70	$272,500	III	
2023	Mission of Joy	Tyler Gaffalione	H. Graham Motion	RyZan Sun Racing & Madaket Stables	1 1/8 miles	1:49.05	$205,000	III	
2022	Walkathon	Julien R. Leparoux	Ian R. Wilkes	Whitham Thoroughbreds	1 1/8 miles	1:49.26	$195,000	III	
2021	Gam's Mission	Adam Beschizza	Cherie DeVaux	Lazy F Ranch	1 1/8 miles	1:51.02	$150,000	III	
2020	Harvey's Lil Goil	Martin Garcia	William I. Mott	Estate of Harvey A. Clarke & Paul Braverman	1 1/8 miles	1:47.70	$100,000	III	
2019	Hard Legacy	Julien R. Leparoux	Norm W. Casse	Marylou Whitney Stables	1 1/8 miles	1:48.22	$150,000	III	
2018	Beyond Blame	Florent Geroux	Brad H. Cox	Pop-A-Top	1 1/8 miles	1:48.94	$100,000	III	
2017	Sweeping Paddy	Luis Saez	Dale L. Romans	William Pacella, Frank L. Jones, Jr., Frank Shoop	1 1/8 miles	1:47.62	$100,000	III	
2016	Auntie Joy	Brian Hernandez Jr.	Brendan P. Walsh	Sanford Robertson	1 1/8 miles	1:49.24	$100,000	III	
2015	Prado's Sweet Ride	Julien R. Leparoux	Chris M. Block	Darrell & Sadie Brommer	1 1/8 miles	1:51.88	$100,000	III	
2014	‡ Aurelia's Belle	John R. Velazquez	Wayne M. Catalano	James F. Miller	1 1/8 miles	1:48.02	$100,000	III	
2013	Kitten's Dumplings	Joel Rosario	Michael J. Maker	Ken and Sarah Ramsey	1 1/8 miles	1:48.41	$100,000	III	
2012	Centre Court	Javier Castellano	George R. Arnold II	G. Watts Humphrey Jr. & Louise Ireland Humphrey (Trust)	1 1/8 miles	1:48.25	$114,200	III	
2011	Bizzy Caroline	Manoel R. Cruz	Kenneth G. McPeek	Runnymeade Farm	1 1/8 miles	1:49.73	$138,125	III	
2010	Caminadora	Corey Nakatani	Todd A. Pletcher	Starlight Partners	1 1/8 miles	1:52.04	$145,250	III	
2009	Keertana	Robby Albarado	Thomas F. Proctor	Barbara Hunter	1 1/8 miles	1:52.02	$200,000	III	
2008	Pure Clan	Julien R. Leparoux	Robert E. Holthus	Lewis Lakin, IEAH Stable & Pegasus Holding Group Stables	1 1/8 miles	1:49.86	$217,000	III	
2007	Good Mood (IRE)	Edgar S. Prado	Patrick L. Biancone	Flying Zee Stable	1 1/8 miles	1:47.57	$228,600	III	
2006	Lady of Venice (FR)	Julien R. Leparoux	Patrick L. Biancone	Martin S. Schwartz	1 1/8 miles	1:47.31	$229,000	III	
2005	Rich in Spirit	Gary L. Stevens	Thomas F. Proctor	Glen Hill Farm	1 1/8 miles	1:49.76	$225,000	III	
2004	Sister Star	Brice Blanc	Kenneth G. McPeek	John & Julie Marker	1 1/8 miles	1:51.40	$221,800	III	
2003	Sand Springs	Mark Guidry	Anthony L. Reinstedler	Willmott Stables	1 1/8 miles	1:48.78	$231,000	III	
2002	Distant Valley (GB)	Jerry D. Bailey	Niall M. O'Callaghan	Gary A. Tanaka	1 1/16 miles	1:42.71	$169,050	III	
2001	Casual Feat	Larry Melancon	Steven C. Penrod	Hidaway Farm	1 1/16 miles	1:42.75	$167,250	III	
2000	Solvig	Pat Day	Carl A. Nafzger	Bentley Smith Revocable Trust	1 1/16 miles	1:42.95	$168,450	III	
1999	Nani Rose	Shane Sellers	Patrick B. Byrne	Stonerside Stable	1 1/16 miles	1:42.40	$168,450	III	
1998	Formal Tango	Charles R. Woods Jr.	Albert Stall Jr.	David J. Hulkewicz	1 1/16 miles	1:48.73	$170,850	Listed	
1997	Starry Dreamer	Willie Martinez	Claude R. McGaughey III	H. Joseph Allen	1 1/16 miles	1:42.77	$111,900	Listed	
1996	Daylight Come	Curt C. Bourque	Daniel J. Vella	Frank Stronach	1 1/16 miles	1:45.72	$85,425	Listed	
1995	Christmas Gift	Charles R. Woods Jr.	Mark A. Hennig	Edward P. Evans	1 1/16 miles	1:45.00	$83,400	Listed	
1994	Packet	Joe M. Johnson	Gary G. Hartlage	Upson Downs Farm & Patricia Lenihan	1 1/16 miles	1:42.14	$83,925	Listed	
1993	Lovat's Lady	Brian Dale Peck	A. Peter Perkins	Wimborne Farm & Abigail Kawananakoa	1 1/16 miles	1:42.95	$56,300	Listed	
1992	Tiney Toast	Shawn Phillip Payton	D. Wayne Lukas	Delwin Locke	1 1/16 miles	1:44.40	$57,600	Listed	
1991	Maria Balastiere	Aaron Gryder	William I. Mott	David Richardson & Hiram Polk, Jr.	1 1/16 miles	1:44.40	$54,950	Listed	
1990	Secret Advice	Brent E. Bartram	W. Elliott Walden	Golden Oak Farm	1 1/16 miles	1:44.40	$55,100		
1989	Justice Will Come	Steve H. Bass	Herbert K. Stevens	Mrs. James H. Gallagher	1 1/16 miles	1:46.20	$56,450		
1988	Lets Do Lunch	K. Keith Allen	Louis M. Goldfine	Richard Duchossois	1 1/16 miles	1:45.60	$70,550		
1987	Jonowo	Michael McDowell	Burk Kessinger Jr.	Richard Leniham	1 mile	1:39.20	$57,100		
1986	Rosemont Risk	Pat Day	William I. Mott	Rosemont Farm	1 mile	1:36.80	$38,600		
1985	Weekend Delight	James McKnight	Neil J. Howard	William S. Farish	1 mile	1:35.60	$32,350		
1984	Mrs. Revere	Larry Melancon	William I. Mott	Hiram Polk, Jr.	1 mile	1:36.60	$33,025		
1983	Rosy Spectre	James McKnight	Eduardo Inda	Tom E. Gentry	1 mile	1:37.80	$30,675		
1982	Amazing Love	Larry Melancon	A. J. Foyt III	A. J. Foyt, Jr.	1 mile	1:37.00	$29,675		Division 1
1982	Sefa's Beauty	Mark S. Sellers	Larry D. Edwards	Farid Sefa	1 mile	1:37.60	$29,450		Division 2
1981	Contrefaire	Thomas Barrow	Robert S. DuBois	Herbert H. Hill	6 furlongs	1:11.60	$25,700		
1980	No No Nona	Melvin Arthur Holland	Timothy J. Walker	John Oxley	6 furlongs	1:12.00	$24,563		Division 1
1980	Forever Cordial	Richard DePass	John T. Ward Jr.	Carl Swan	6 furlongs	1:12.00	$23,692		Division 2
1979	Fearless Dame	Richard DePass	Stanley M. Rieser	Robert Courtney	6 furlongs	1:10.80	$24,300		
1978	Unconscious Doll	Eddie Delahoussaye	Raymond S. Lawrence Jr.	C. C. Green	6 furlongs	1:10.60	$22,850		
1977	†§ Shady Lou	Eddie Delahoussaye	Richard J. Fischer	Leslie Combs II	6 furlongs	1:10.60	$22,350		
1976	Carmelita Gibbs	Robert Breen	Doug M. Davis Jr.	Don Sucher	6 furlongs	1:12.80	$22,313		Division 1
1976	Confort Zone	Julio C. Espinoza	William E. Adams	Golden Chance Farm	6 furlongs	1:12.80	$21,713		Division 2
1975	Red Cross	Don Brumfield	Charles R. Werstler	Dixiana Stable	6 furlongs	1:09.60	$23,450		
1974	Clemanna	Julio C. Espinoza	William E. Adams	Golden Chance Farm	6 furlongs	1:11.20	$22,713		Division 1
1974	Mary Dugan	James McKnight	Johnnie Johnson, Jr.	Jackson, Trick, Bayne	6 furlongs	1:10.40	$23,313		Division 2
1973	Juke Joint	Weston Soirez	Anthony L. Basile	Bwamazon Farm	6 furlongs	1:11.80	$23,900		
1972	Nalees Folly	Robert Breen	Stanley M. Rieser	Mr. S. Fairman, Jr.	6 furlongs	1:11.80	$23,175		
1971	Peninsula Princess	Mike Mangello	Richard J. Fischer	Leslie Combs II	6 furlongs	1:11.20	$24,275		
1970	Three Pigeons	Thomas Barrow	Patrick B. Devereux, Sr.	John W. Greathouse	6 furlongs	1:10.80	$23,675		

Legend:
Turf Dirt
Notes:
† In 1977, Time for Pleasure won but was disqualified after laying in the stretch and was placed second.
‡ In 2014, A Little Bit Sassy won but was disqualified for interfering with Kiss Moon and was placed fourth. Aurelia's Belle who finished second was declared the winner.

§ Ran as part of an entry

== See also ==
- List of American and Canadian Graded races
