= Just a Game Stakes =

Just A Game Stakes
- Class: Grade I
- Location: Belmont Park; Elmont, New York, United States
- Inaugurated: 1992
- Race type: Thoroughbred – Flat racing
- Website: NYRA

Race information
- Distance: 1 mile (8 furlongs)
- Surface: Turf
- Track: Left-handed
- Qualification: Fillies & Mares, four-years-old and older
- Weight: 124lbs with allowances
- Purse: US$500,000 (2021)

The Just A Game Stakes is a Grade I American Thoroughbred horse race for fillies and mares age four and up run over a distance of one mile (8 furlongs) on the turf held annually in June at Belmont Park in Elmont, New York. The event offers a purse of $500,000.

== History ==
The race is named in honor of Peter Brant's filly, Just A Game, who was voted 1980 American Champion Female Turf Horse honors.

The event was inaugurated on Independence Day in 1992 and run over a distance of 1 3/8 miles on a muddy dirt track, won by Lady Lear who defeated the Irish Bred favorite by a length in a time of 2:15 9/10.

The event was not held in 1993 but the next year the event was moved to the turf and run over a mile.

The event was classified as a Grade III in 1997, upgraded to Grade II in 2004 and a Grade I in 2008.

The event carried Breeders' Cup incentives between 1996 and 2005 which were reflected in the name of the event.

Several mares have won this event who later became champions. The 2000 winner Perfect Sting later that year won the Breeders' Cup Filly & Mare Turf and was crowned US Champion Female Turf Horse. The 2004 British bred winner Intercontinental returned the following year only to get defeated into second place by Sand Springs but by the end of the season she made amends by winning Breeders' Cup Filly & Mare Turf and also becoming the 2005 US Champion Female Turf Horse. The 2015 winner Tepin continued en route to a Breeders' Cup Mile win and honored as 2015 US Champion Female Turf Horse.

In 2024 the event was moved to Saratoga Racetrack due to infield tunnel and redevelopment work at Belmont Park.

== Records ==
Speed record:

- 1:31.64 – Celestine (2016)

Margins:

- 6 lengths – Elizabeth Bay (1994)

Most wins:

- 2 – Caress (1995, 1996)

Most wins by an owner:

- 4 – Juddmonte Farms (2004, 2008, 2010, 2017)

Most wins by a jockey:

- 4 – Javier Castellano (2011, 2014, 2017, 2019)
- 4 – Irad Ortiz Jr. (2018, 2020, 2023, 2024)

Most wins by a trainer:

- 8 – Chad C. Brown (2017, 2018, 2019, 2020, 2022, 2023, 2024, 2025)

== Winners ==
Year	Winner	Age	Jockey	Trainer	Owner	Distance	Time	Purse	Grade	Ref
At Saratoga – Just a Game Stakes
2026	Classic Q	4	John R. Velazquez	Mark E. Casse	Gary Barber, Blue Crevalle Racing and Eclipse Thoroughbred Partners	1 mile	1:32.84	$500,000	I	
2025	Dynamic Pricing (IRE)	4	Dylan Davis	Chad C. Brown	Klaravich Stables	1 mile	1:38.77	$500,000	I	
2024	Chili Flag (FR)	5	Irad Ortiz Jr.	Chad C. Brown	Madaket Stables, Michael Dubb & Michael E. Kisber	1 mile	1:35.01	$500,000	I	
At Belmont Park
2023	In Italian (GB)	5	Irad Ortiz Jr.	Chad C. Brown	Peter M. Brant	1 mile	1:34.00	$485,000	I	
2022	Regal Glory	6	José Ortiz	Chad C. Brown	Peter M. Brant	1 mile	1:32.00	$480,000	I	
2021	Althiqa (GB)	4	Mike E. Smith	Charlie Appleby	Godolphin	1 mile	1:33.90	$500,000	I	
2020	Newspaperofrecord (IRE)	4	Irad Ortiz Jr.	Chad C. Brown	Klaravich Stables	1 mile	1:35.62	$250,000	I	
2019	Rushing Fall	4	Javier Castellano	Chad C. Brown	e Five Racing Thoroughbreds	1 mile	1:31.67	$671,000	I	
2018	A Raving Beauty (GER)	5	Irad Ortiz Jr.	Chad C. Brown	Michael Dubb, Madaket Stables, Bethlehem Stables	1 mile	1:32.14	$700,000	I	
2017	Antonoe	4	Javier Castellano	Chad C. Brown	Juddmonte Farms	1 mile	1:32.12	$687,000	I	
2016	Celestine	4	Junior Alvarado	William I. Mott	James Bryan, Jr	1 mile	1:31.64	$700,000	I	
2015	Tepin	4	Julien R. Leparoux	Mark E. Casse	Robert E. Masterson	1 mile	1:35.65	$700,000	I	
2014	Coffee Clique	4	Javier Castellano	Brian A. Lynch	Amerman Racing (Jerry & Joan Amerman)	1 mile	1:32.52	$750,000	I	
2013	Stephanie's Kitten	4	John R. Velazquez	Wayne M. Catalano	Kenneth and Sarah Ramsey	1 mile	1:36.27	$500,000	I	
2012	Tapitsfly	5	Ramon A. Dominguez	Dale L. Romans	Frank Jones Jr.	1 mile	1:32.34	$500,000	I	
2011	C. S. Silk	5	Javier Castellano	Dale L. Romans	William Pacella, Fred Barbara & George Bonomo	1 mile	1:40.53	$400,000	I	
2010	Proviso (GB)	5	Mike E. Smith	William I. Mott	Juddmonte Farms	1 mile	1:34.09	$400,000	I	
2009	Diamondrella (GB)	5	Rajiv Maragh	Angel A. Penna Jr.	Castletop Stable	1 mile	1:36.49	$400,000	I	
2008	Ventura	4	Garrett K. Gomez	Robert J. Frankel	Juddmonte Farms	1 mile	1:32.75	$400,000	I	
2007	My Typhoon (IRE)	5	Eddie Castro	William I. Mott	Live Oak Plantation	1 mile	1:34.92	$294,000	II	
Just a Game Handicap
2006	Gorella (FR)	4	Julien R. Leparoux	Patrick L. Biancone	Martin S. Schwartz	1 mile	1:37.14	$285,000	II	
2005	Sand Springs	5	John R. Velazquez	William I. Mott	Sangster Family Stable	1 mile	1:33.05	$300,000	II	
2004	§ Intercontinental (GB)	4	Jerry D. Bailey	Robert J. Frankel	Juddmonte Farms	1 mile	1:33.33	$226,333	II	
2003	§ Mariensky	4	José A. Santos	Christophe Clement	Waterville Lake Stable	1 mile	1:43.28	$214,500	III	
2002	Babae (CHI)	6	Jorge F. Chavez	Frank A. Alexander	Joseph P. Platt Jr.	1 mile	1:34.57	$147,200	III	
2001	License Fee	6	Pat Day	W. Elliott Walden	Winstar Farm	1 mile	1:32.62	$189,050	III	
2000	Perfect Sting	4	Jerry D. Bailey	Joe Orseno	Stronach Stables	1 mile	1:34.48	$165,800	III	
1999	Cozy Blues	5	Jorge F. Chavez	H. James Bond	Sandy & Joanne Dew	1 mile	1:33.33	$157,700	III	
1998	Witchful Thinking	4	Chris McCarron	Niall M. O'Callaghan	Leslie R. Grimm	1 mile	1:33.45	$157,325	III	
1997	Memories of Silver	4	Jerry D. Bailey	James J. Toner	Joan & John Phillips	1 mile	1:32.90	$158,950	III	
1996	† Caress	5	Robbie Davis	H. Allen Jerkens	Harbor View Farm	1 mile	1:33.30	$158,150	Listed	
Just a Game Stakes
1995	Caress	4	Robbie Davis	H. Allen Jerkens	Harbor View Farm	1 mile	1:32.53	$82,000	Listed	
1994	Elizabeth Bay	4	Mike E. Smith	William I. Mott	Mohammed Al Maktoum	1 mile	1:32.85	$55,550	Listed	
1993	Race not held									
1992	Lady Lear	5	Gerry Brocklebank	Linda L. Rice	Mark Weiss	1 3/8 miles	2:15.90	$78,900	Listed	

Legend:
Turf Dirt
Notes:
† In 1996, Class Kris finished first but was disqualified and set back to second
§ Ran as part of an entry

== See also ==
List of American and Canadian Graded races
