= La Corredora =

American-bred Thoroughbred racehorse

- Sire: Little Beans
- Grandsire: Mirafel
- Dam: Nellie Mowlee
- Damsire: Mowlee
- Sex: Mare
- Foaled: 1949
- Country: United States
- Colour: Bay
- Breeder: Marian W. O'Connor
- Owner: Marian W. O'Connor
- Trainer: 1) Alan T. Clarke; 2) Carl Hanford
- Record: 56: 15-4-8
- Earnings: US$178,067

Major wins
- Pimlico Breeders' Stakes (1951); Assembly Purse (1952); Vineland Trial (1952); Gallorette Handicap (1952); Monmouth Oaks (1952); Ladies Handicap (1953); Comely Handicap (1953); Water Blossom Classified Handicap (1954)

Awards
- NYTWA American Champion Handicap Mare (1953)

La Corredora (foaled 1949) was an American Thoroughbred racemare voted the American Champion Handicap Mare of 1953 by the New York Turf Writers Association.

La Corredora, which in the Spanish language means "The Runner", was sired by multiple stakes winner Little Beans and out of the mare Nellie Mowlee. She was bred by Marian W. O'Connor at Alan Clarke's Huntington Farm near Clarksville, Maryland.

== Racing career ==
Trained by future U.S. Racing Hall of Fame inductee Carl Hanford, his brother Ira Hanford would be La Corredora's regular jockey.

As a two-year-old, La Corredora's most important win came in the 1951 Pimlico Breeders' Stakes for trainer Alan Clark. 1952 saw Carl Hanford responsible for the three-year-old's race conditioning and she won the July 30 Monmouth Oaks by a nose in a highly competitive field that produced a blanket finish. On November 11, 1952, La Corredora won the inaugural running of the Gallorette Handicap at Pimlico Race Course.

=== New York Championship Year ===
Through September 1953, the four-year-old La Corredora had won only two non-stakes races. However, in the September 19 Beldame Handicap at Aqueduct Racetrack she showed signs she might be getting back to top form. In spite of traffic problems on the first turn and then being forced wide as she turned for home, La Corredora finished a strong third in the Beldame to the Darby Dan Farm winner Atalanta. On October 7 she won America's oldest stakes race for fillies and mares, the Ladies Handicap at Belmont Park. She then followed up with another win on November 3 in the first division of the Comely Handicap, run that year at the Jamaica Race Course. In a field of eleven, La Corredora beat Canadiana who finished in front of third-place finisher Arab Actress.

At age four, La Corredora had limited racing success.

== As a broodmare ==
La Corredora had very little success at stud even though she was bred to some of the most distinguished names in Thoroughbred racing including Hall of Fame inductees Count Fleet, the 1943 U.S. Triple Crown winner, and Native Dancer.

== Pedigree ==
Pedigree of La Corredora, bay mare, 1949
| Sire Little Beans | Mirafel | High Time | Ultimus |
| Sire Little Beans | Mirafel | High Time | Noonday |
| Sire Little Beans | Mirafel | Rush Box | Box |
| Sire Little Beans | Mirafel | Rush Box | Sallie Ward |
| Sire Little Beans | Florhi | Playfellow | Fair Play |
| Sire Little Beans | Florhi | Playfellow | Mahubah |
| Sire Little Beans | Florhi | Starlight Dance | Star Shoot |
| Sire Little Beans | Florhi | Starlight Dance | Lady Tarantella |
| Dam Nellie Mowlee | Mowlee | Lucullite | Trap Rock |
| Dam Nellie Mowlee | Mowlee | Lucullite | Lucky Lass |
| Dam Nellie Mowlee | Mowlee | Epinglette | Sardanapale |
| Dam Nellie Mowlee | Mowlee | Epinglette | Safety Pin |
| Dam Nellie Mowlee | Linton Nell | Pennant | Peter Pan |
| Dam Nellie Mowlee | Linton Nell | Pennant | Royal Rose |
| Dam Nellie Mowlee | Linton Nell | Olive Wood | The Manager |
| Dam Nellie Mowlee | Linton Nell | Olive Wood | Fancywood (family: 12-b) |
