= License Fee (horse) =

Canadian Thoroughbred racehorse

- Breed: Thoroughbred
- Sire: Black Tie Affair
- Grandsire: Miswaki
- Dam: Star Deputy
- Damsire: Deputy Minister (horse)
- Sex: female
- Foaled: 1995
- Died: 2001
- Country: Canada
- Colour: Chestnut
- Breeder: Pedigree Farms
- Owner: WinStar Farm
- Earnings: US$1,200,416

License Fee (1995–2001) was a chestnut Thoroughbred racehorse mare, by Black Tie Affair and out of the Deputy Minister mare Star Deputy. She was bred by Pedigree Farms in Ontario, Canada, and went on to win four graded stakes races. License Fee was initially trained by Stanley Hough. After being sold for US$330,000 to WinStar Farm in November 1999, she was trained by W. Elliott Walden.

License Fee had 16 wins out of 43 starts, with total earnings of US$1,200,416. Her wins include:

- 2000 Ballston Spa Handicap (US$125,700), won by one and a half lengths, ridden by Pat Day.
- 2001 Gallorette Handicap (US$60,000), won by half a length, ridden by Pat Day.
- 2001 Just a Game Stakes (US$175,000), won by a short head, ridden by Pat Day.
- 2001 Sixty Sails Handicap (US$300,000), won by five lengths, ridden by Larry Melancon.

In June 2001, License Fee broke her right front leg during the Molly Pitcher Stakes, and was euthanized at the Monmouth Park Racetrack.
