= Somali Lemonade =

American-bred Thoroughbred racehorse

Somali Lemonade was an American Thoroughbred racehorse.

The bay mare won the Grade I 2014 Diana Stakes.

Somali Lemonade had multiple Grade III stakes wins including the Jessamine Stakes and the Gallorette Handicap.

For a career total, the horse won 25% of its races (6 wins in 24 starts) and had nearly $1,000,000 in earnings. She died on January 23, 2016, of foaling complications.
