= Thomas F. Proctor =

American horse trainer

Personal information
- Born: April 21, 1956 (age 70) Gilmer, Texas
- Occupation: Trainer

Horse racing career
- Sport: Horse racing
- Career wins: 1,157+ (ongoing)

Major racing wins
- Palos Verdes Handicap (1981); Phoenix Stakes (1988); Sorority Stakes (1990); Aqueduct Breeders' Cup Handicap (1993); Louisville Breeders' Cup Handicap (1994); Dominion Day Stakes (2002); Arlington Classic (2005); Commonwealth Turf Stakes (2005); Regret Stakes (2005, 2009); Locust Grove Handicap (2006, 2009); Arlington Oaks (2006); Sea o'Erin Stakes (2006); Opening Verse Handicap (2007); Shadwell Turf Mile Stakes (2007); Pucker Up Stakes (2008); Kent Stakes (2009); Glens Falls Handicap (2010); Hollywood Derby (2015); Hollywood Turf Cup Stakes (2018) Breeders' Cup wins: Breeders' Cup Distaff (1994)

Significant horses
- I'm Smokin, One Dreamer, Purim

Thomas F. Proctor (born April 21, 1956, in Gilmer, Texas) is an American trainer of Thoroughbred racehorses who won the 1994 edition of the Breeders' Cup Distaff with One Dreamer. The son of trainer Willard Proctor, Thomas began his training career in 1978 at Hollywood Park Racetrack.
