= W. Elliott Walden =

American horse trainer

Personal information
- Born: February 10, 1963 (age 63) Lexington, Kentucky
- Occupation: Trainer / Executive

Horse racing career
- Sport: Horse racing
- Career wins: 1,017

Major racing wins
- Regret Stakes (1990); Red Smith Handicap (1992); Kentucky Cup Turf Stakes (1994); Arlington Classic (1995, 2002); Niagara Handicap (1995); Pocahontas Stakes (1995); Round Table Stakes (1995); Secretariat Stakes (1995); Amsterdam Stakes (1996); Bourbonette Oaks (1996); Busher Stakes (1996); Louisville Handicap (1996); Selene Stakes (1996); American Turf Stakes (1997); Boiling Springs Stakes (1997); Florida Oaks (1997); Lone Star Park Handicap (1997); Salvator Mile Handicap (1997, 1999); Ack Ack Handicap (1998); Arkansas Derby (1998); Rebel Stakes (1998); Ballston Spa Handicap (1999, 2000); Blue Grass Stakes (1999); Bourbon Stakes (1999, 2001); Hillsborough Stakes (1999, 2000); Haskell Invitational Handicap (1999); Hutcheson Stakes (1999); Jenny Wiley Stakes (1999); Jim Dandy Stakes (1999); Risen Star Stakes (1999); Stephen Foster Handicap (1999); Super Derby (1999); Whitney Handicap (1999); Hollywood Derby (2000); Iroquois Stakes (2000); Kent Stakes (2000); Spinster Stakes (2000); Derby Trial Stakes (2001); Gallorette Handicap (2001); Just A Game Stakes (2001); Adirondack Stakes (2002); Churchill Downs Debutante Stakes (2002); Cornhusker Handicap (2002); Spinaway Stakes (2002); Wishing Well Stakes (2003); Pan American Stakes (2003, 2004) American Classic Race wins: Belmont Stakes (1998)

Significant horses
- Distorted Humor, Ipi Tombe, License Fee, Menifee, Victory Gallop

W. Elliott Walden (born February 10, 1963, in Lexington, Kentucky) is the president and CEO of racing operations for WinStar Farm near Versailles, Kentucky and a former Thoroughbred racehorse trainer.

== Early life ==
From a racing family, Walden grew up in the industry. As a kid, Walden cleaned stalls, washed horses and rode horses. Walden's father attached a basketball hoop on top of one of the stalls which racehorse No Robbery was in, and Elliott would play basketball there with his brother Ben Jr.

== Career ==
He worked as an assistant for high-profile trainers such as LeRoy Jolley and John Gosden before taking out his trainers' license in 1985 and trained four horses for his father, Ben P. Walden Sr.

In 1998, Elliott Walden conditioned Victory Gallop to a win in the Belmont Stakes, the third leg of the U.S. Triple Crown series. The following year Victory Gallop gave Walden his first Champion when he was voted the 1999 American Champion Older Male Horse. In 2001, Walden trained License Fee to victory in the Just a Game Stakes.

In 2002, Walden took over training of the Winstar Farm racing stable and in 2003 was appointed vice president of racing and bloodstock services. Since 2010, Walden has been the CEO of Winstar Farms.

== Personal life ==
Walden's wife Rebecca is a native of England. Walden and his wife Rebecca have four children together. Walden is a born again Christian.
