= G. Watts Humphrey Jr. =

- Born: Cleveland, Ohio, U.S.
- Occupation: Horse breeder

G. Watts Humphrey Jr. (born June 12, 1944, in Cleveland, Ohio) is a Pittsburgh businessman and thoroughbred owner and breeder.

== Background ==
Humphrey's paternal grandfather was George M. Humphrey, who served as Secretary of the Treasury for President Dwight D. Eisenhower. After graduating from Yale University with a Bachelor of Arts, Humphrey obtained a Master of Business Administration from Harvard Business School.

In business, Humphrey is the president of GWH Holdings, Inc., a private investment company, and the chairman and CEO of International Plastics Equipment Group, Inc. and Centria, an innovator in metal buildings exteriors. Humphrey is also a director of Churchill Downs. An active owner and breeder, Humphrey is also owner of Shawnee Farms in Harrodsburg, Kentucky and has a long list of stakes winners to his credit.

In 1999 the Keeneland Association honored Humphrey with their Mark of Distinction.
