= Juan González =

Juan González may refer to:

== Sports ==
=== Association football ===
- Juan Carlos González (1924–2010), Uruguayan football defender
- Juan González (footballer, born 1945), Mexican footballer
- Juan González (footballer, born 1972), Uruguayan football striker
- Juan Luis González (born 1974), Chilean football manager and former defender
- Juan González (footballer, born 1975), Chilean football centre-back
- Juan Diego González (born 1980), Colombian football defender
- Juan González-Vigil (born 1985), Peruvian football striker

=== Other sports ===
- Juan González de Vega (1917–1990), Cuban chess player
- El Hijo del Diablo (Juan Carlos Gonzales, born 1962), Mexican professional wrestler
- Juan González (baseball) (born 1969), Puerto Rican Major League Baseball player
- Juan González (handballer) (born 1974), Cuban handball player
- Juan González (judoka) (born 1967), Guatemalan judoka
- Juan González (volleyball) (born 1994), Spanish volleyball player
- Juan Gonzalez (rugby union) (born 2003), Uruguayan rugby player
- Juan González Cornet (1917-1973), Colombian baseball manager and executive
- Juan Gonzalez (jockey), Mexican-born jockey in American Thoroughbred horse racing

== Other people ==
- Juan González Arintero(1860–1928), Spanish priest
- Juan Gonzalez (artist) (1942–1993), U.S.-based Cuban artist
- Juan González-Barba Pera (born 1966), Spanish diplomat and writer
- Juan González-Castelao, Spanish musicologist
- Juan González (journalist) (born 1947), Puerto Rican journalist, a frequent co-host on Democracy Now!
- Juan González Gómez (born 1973), Spanish computer scientist
- Juan González de Mendoza (1545–1618), Spanish sinologist
- Juan González Meneses (died 1521), Spanish prelate of the Roman Catholic Church
- Juan E. González, American geneticist and educator
- Juan Gualberto González (1851–1912), president of Paraguay, 1890–1894
- Juan Ignacio González del Castillo (1763–1800), Spanish playwright
- Juan de Marcos González (born 1954), Cuban bandleader
- Juan Natalicio González (1897–1966), president of Paraguay, 1948
- Juan Pablo Gonzalez (born 1987), Botswanan gymnast; see 2013 European Wrestling Championships – Men's freestyle 55 kg
- Juan Pablo González (born 1984), Mexican film director
- Juan Picasso González (1857–1935), Spanish army officer

== Other uses ==
- Juan González, Adjuntas, Puerto Rico, a barrio of Adjuntas, Puerto Rico

== See also ==
- Joan Gonzàlez (born 2002), Spanish footballer
- Juan Antonio González (disambiguation)
- Juan Manuel González (disambiguation)
