= Mairzy Doates =

American Thoroughbred racehorse (1976–1998)

- Mairzy Doates, ridden by Cash Asmussen, mid-race at the 1981 Japan Cup
- Breed: Thoroughbred
- Sire: Nodouble
- Grandsire: Noholme
- Dam: Avalanche Lily
- Damsire: T. V. Lark
- Sex: Mare
- Foaled: April 1, 1976; Hamburg Place, Lexington, Kentucky, U.S.
- Died: May 25, 1998 (aged 22); France
- Country: United States
- Colour: Bay
- Breeder: Preston and Patrick Madden
- Owner: Arno D. Schefler
- Trainer: Horatio Luro, John W. Fulton amongst others
- Record: 33: 12-5-4
- Earnings: US$740,573 (equivalent to $2,623,000 in 2025)

Major wins
- Yerba Buena Handicap (G3: 1980, 1981); La Prevoyante Handicap (Ungraded, (Note: Later promoted to G3 in 1982, renamed to the Christophe Clement Stakes in 2025.) 1981); New York Handicap (G3, 1981); Matchmaker Stakes (G2, 1981); International race wins: Japan Cup (Ungraded, (Note: While the Japan Cup was not formally graded until 1984, Mairzy Doates is frequently reported as a Grade 1 winner through her 1981 victory in race reports, news articles, and pedigree records.) 1981)

Honors
- Mairzy Doates Purse; Atlantic City Race Course, 1982; Turf Paradise, 1986; Mairzy Doates Handicap; Saratoga Race Course, 1992; Aqueduct Racetrack, 1996; Golden Gate Fields, 1997; Belmont Park, 1998; Calder Race Course, 2008; Mairzy Doates Stakes; Calder Race Course, 2013

Mairzy Doates (April 1, 1976 – May 25, 1998) was an American Thoroughbred racehorse and multiple graded stakes winner, most remembered for her victory at the inaugural Japan Cup in 1981. Owned by New York City art dealer Arno D. Schefler and trained primarily by future U.S. Racing Hall of Fame inductee Horatio Luro, she competed successfully across the United States from 1978 to 1981, including winning the Yerba Buena Handicap twice.

In her final race, she traveled to Tokyo to contest the first Japan Cup, an international invitational established by the Japan Racing Association (JRA) to assess Japanese horses' performance against the rest of the world. She defeated the field in a course-record time, which alongside the strength of the other foreign horses, was widely considered as evidence of the disparity between Japanese and international horse-racing standards. Her performance is frequently credited as the catalyst for the JRA's long-term initiative to improve the caliber of Japanese breeding and racing. Following her victory, which made her 1981's highest-earning mare globally, Mairzy Doates retired from racing to become a broodmare in Midway, Kentucky. She gave birth to nine foals before dying at the age of 22.

== Early life ==
Mairzy Doates was born April 1, 1976, bred by Preston and Patrick Madden, a pair of horse-training brothers who operated out of Hamburg Place in Kentucky. Her sire was Nodouble, a multiple graded stakes winner who had retired to stud in 1970, and later became the leading sire in North America in 1981. In contrast, her dam, Avalanche Lily, had only raced lightly and never won, but she was a foal of leading sire and 1960 Grass Horse of the Year T. V. Lark, and a descendant of Man o' War. Mairzy Doates's mare line traces directly to Cinq a Sept, winner of the 1927 Irish Oaks, making Mairzy Doates a distant relative of Secretariat.

Two years later in 1978, Arno D. Schefler, a New York art dealer and investment banker who had dealt in Thoroughbred horses since 1967, purchased Mairzy Doates as a filly from the Maddens. Schefler was the one to name her, referencing the novelty song "Mairzy Doats" made popular in a 1943 recording by bandleader Al Trace. She was briefly trained by Angel Penna and then Mickey Preger, but by winter, Schefler had handed Mairzy Doates over to Horatio Luro, a veteran horse-trainer with whom Schefler had become acquainted in the early 1970s. Mairzy Doates was brought to Luro's stable in Miami, where she had to be closely monitored while training due to the weakness of her ankles.

== Racing history ==
Mairzy Doates raced once as a two-year-old, finishing sixth out of ten at the Aqueduct Racetrack on December 22, 1978. Over two months, Mairzy Doates vied several times for a maiden race victory, eventually winning on her fourth attempt on February 4, 1979. (Note: While chronologically, Mairzy Doates was still two years old during her races in January and February, since 1834, all Thoroughbred horses in North America are officially given a January 1 birthday to simplify registration and age-based races.) Her first graded race, the Grade 3 Ruthless Stakes on February 18, went poorly; Mairzy Doates remained thoroughly distanced from the other horses for the entirety of the race until her jockey eased her before the finish line. Nevertheless, Mairzy Doates continued to race throughout the rest of the year, winning several allowance races and placing third in the Grade 1 Alabama Stakes. By December, and at her final race of the year at the Busher Handicap, commentators had noted Mairzy Doates's improved performance.

The next year, Schefler wished to race Mairzy Doates on the West Coast due to more racing opportunities being available in the area. Luro suggested that Mike Whittingham, the son of the U.S. Racing Hall of Fame trainer Charlie Whittingham, take over as trainer during their Western campaign. Mairzy Doates did not manage to place higher than fifth in both of her next two graded races: the Grade 1 Santa Barbara Handicap on March 23 and the Grade 2 Gamely Handicap on May 4. However, on May 26, 1980, she achieved her first graded victory at the Golden Gate's Grade 3 Yerba Buena Handicap in dominant fashion, beating her opponents "about as easily as a horse can" in the 1 3/8 mi race by six lengths and with a winning time of 2:15.

In July, Mairzy Doates was announced as an entrant in the Grade 2 Matchmaker Stakes, a race so-called as the top three placers' owners were given the choice of several high-end stallions for stud services, but had to withdraw after suffering a high fever. Around this time, Mairzy Doates was injured and returned to train under Luro; she was not able to race again until December 22, where she won an allowance race by three lengths over Quick As Lightning.

In her final year of racing in 1981, Mairzy Doates again failed to win a Grade 1 race in her three attempts, her best performance being a narrow defeat by a nose in the Santa Barbara Handicap. In her following races, she subsequently achieved a triple run of graded victories. She repeated her previous win in the Yerba Buena Handicap with a similar large margin of victory, then edged out Love Sign in the Grade 3 New York Handicap. Finally, at the Matchmaker Stakes, she made up for her withdrawal from the previous year's race with a 1 1/4 length victory over Honey Fox. Schefler considered using his awarded choice of stallion to pair leading stallion Raja Baba with Mairzy Doates, although this plan ultimately fell through and Raja Baba was instead paired with another of Schefler's mares. By July, Mairzy Doates was considered a leading contender for turf-racing fillies in North America, and placed in her final two Grade 2 races in the year.

=== Japan Cup ===
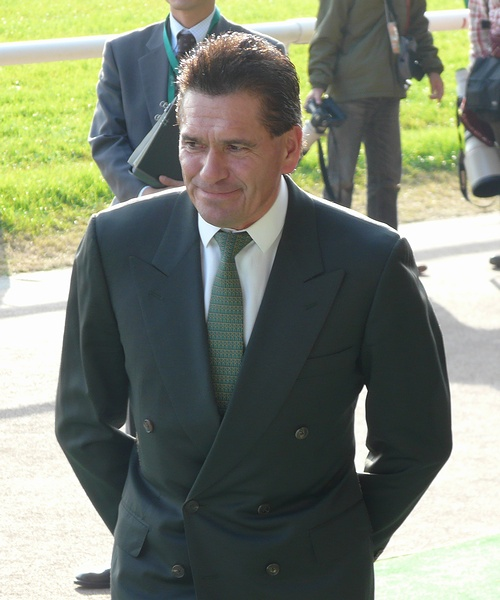
Cash Asmussen (pictured in 2010), Mairzy Doates's jockey in the Japan Cup, who was 19 at the time of the race

In November 1981, Mairzy Doates was one of several American horses invited to Tokyo to take part in the first running of the Japan Cup, an international race over 2,400m designed by the Japan Racing Association (JRA) to assess the performance of their horses against the rest of the world on home turf. While the JRA had attempted to invite several prominent horses such as John Henry, the final line-up of international horses was ultimately deemed unremarkable, while Japan fielded an "all star cast", including the year's autumn Tennō Shō's top three finishers. The most favored entrant of the international group was The Very One, the same horse to whom Mairzy Doates had lost that year's Santa Barbara Handicap by a nose. The Very One had previously run against Mairzy Doates on three other occasions, each time either winning or placing higher than her. While Mairzy Doates's team accepted the invitation, Luro, now 80 years old and recovering from pneumonia, sent John Fulton to cover as trainer.

On the morning of the race, November 22, Schefler and Fulton nearly pulled Mairzy Doates, stating to the race's officials that the ground was too firm for her to run on safely and demanding the entire track be watered. Since this was not possible at such short notice and may have provoked objections from the Japanese jockeys, the race's organizers pretended to agree, placating Schefler and Fulton by saying that the track would be watered throughout the day. In reality, the active sprinklers they pointed out as proof were only for the track's flowerbeds, and the track itself was never touched.

In the race, Mairzy Doates stayed in the mid-pack until the final turn before surging forward in the home straight, overtaking her rivals to win by one length over the Canadian horse Frost King. The Very One finished third, while the leading Japanese runner, Gold Spencer, placed fifth. Her time was 2:25.3, taking a full second off the previous course record set by Green Grass, and came with a purse prize of $295,455 (equivalent to $1,046,000 in 2025).

== Retirement ==
Following her victory in Japan, Mairzy Doates's team decided against running her in the 1982 Santa Barbara Handicap, and her retirement was announced by the end of January 1982. At the time of her career's end, she was the sixteenth-highest money earner in the world for female horses, as well as the highest-earning mare globally for 1981. When discussing his horse's achievements to The Press of Atlantic City, Schefler praised her tenacity and determination:

Mairzy Doates was an all-time wonderful mare. There may have been better fillies in history, but the great thing about her was her enormous courage. She would give you everything she ever had. It is one thing to get a filly, any horse, to give you that courage every once in a while. But Mairzy Doates gave it all of the time.

— Schefler, reflecting on his horse's racing career

After her retirement, Mairzy Doates was transferred to Hurstland Farm in Midway, Kentucky, to stand as a breeding mare, and was quickly paired with the popular French sire Lyphard. Schefler had hoped for a filly to name her 'Dozy Doates'. Instead, Mairzy Doates's first foal was a colt called Mairzy Dancer, born May 5, 1983. She gave birth to seven more foals in America, before transferring to stand in France in 1994. There she had two more foals, Foam and Nachtigall. Two days after giving birth to Nachtigall, Mairzy Doates died on May 25, 1998, at the age of 22.

Mairzy Doates was not considered a successful broodmare. Many of her offspring did not race, and those who did rarely won. However, her final foal, Nachtigall, sired Etoile Nocturne in 2004, a graded winner through the 2009 Grade 3 Hamburg Trophy ran in Hamburg. Divina Preciosa, one of Mairzy Doates' great-granddaughters through Hanging Valley, won several Grade 1 races in Chile in 2013, and retired as a broodmare in Japan.

== Legacy ==
There are no excuses left. Japan's top-class horses were easily defeated by second-rate American horses in a race where all the conditions were advantageous to Japanese horses. The idea of "raising strong horses" will have to be started all over again.

— Sankei Sports' coverage of the first Japan Cup.

While described by Japanese racing journalists in retrospective accounts as a "second-rate mare", Mairzy Doates won at the Japan Cup in a course-record time. Her victory, alongside the performance of the other foreign horses, greatly shocked the Japanese horse racing industry. Expectations in Japan before the race had been mixed; some in the JRA had anticipated that their horses would not be on par with the rest of the world, while others had felt the Japanese horses would hold the advantage. Regardless, the lopsided end-result was still viewed as a complete defeat. The realization that the nation's best horses had been defeated by a mare considered an unexceptional stakes winner in North America was seen as a profound humiliation. As such, the event has frequently been credited as a turning point in the JRA's efforts to improve the quality of their racing stock, both in breeding and racing ability.

=== Honors ===
Since Mairzy Doates's retirement, several one-off races at different racecourses in the United States have been named after her.

Mairzy Doates races
Name	Date	Racecourse	Distance (Track)	Purse	Winner (Jockey)	Margin	Ref
Mairzy Doates Purse	July 17, 1982	Atlantic City Race Course	1 mi (Turf)	$10,000	Majestic North (Pedro Lizarzaburu)	5 lengths	
Mairzy Doates Purse	February 1, 1986	Turf Paradise	1 1/16 mi (Turf)	$7,000	My Julie (Hugo Dittfach)	2 lengths	
Mairzy Doates Handicap	August 1, 1992	Saratoga Race Course	1 mi (Dirt)	$47,000	Lady D'accord (Mike E. Smith)	3 lengths	
Mairzy Doates Handicap	October 30, 1996	Aqueduct Racetrack	1 3/8 mi (Turf)	$50,000	Majestic Dy (Cornelio Velasquez)	4 1/2 lengths	
Mairzy Doates Handicap	May 18, 1997	Golden Gate Fields	1 1/8 mi (Turf)	$35,000	Taxable Deduction (Russell Baze)	Neck	
Mairzy Doates Handicap	June 17, 1998	Belmont Park	1 1/4 mi (Turf)	$54,000	Jus Agendi (Jose Santos)	1/2 length	
Mairzy Doates Handicap	April 26, 2008	Calder Race Course	1 3/8 mi (Turf)	$300,000	Mauralakana (Rene Douglas)	3/4 length	
Mairzy Doates Stakes	May 4, 2013	Calder Race Course	1 1/16 mi (Dirt)	$55,000	Awesome Belle (Fernando Jara)	Nose	

== Race record ==
Mairzy Doates race record
Date	Age	Race	Distance*	Track	Odds	Field	Finish	Win Time	Margin	Jockey	Ref
Dec 22, 1978	2	Maiden Special Weight	6 furlongs	Aqueduct	28.70	10	6	1:11.8 4/5	9 1/4 lengths	Jose Amy	
Jan 7, 1979	3	Maiden Special Weight	6 furlongs	Aqueduct	3.20	8	2	1:11.8 4/5	1 3/4 lengths	Jose Amy	
Jan 14, 1979	3	Maiden Special Weight	6 furlongs	Aqueduct	1.30	10	2	1:13	5 1/2 lengths	Jose Amy	
Feb 4, 1979	3	Maiden Special Weight	8.32 furlongs	Aqueduct	3.40	8	1	1:44 3/5	(3/4 length)	Jose Amy	
Feb 18, 1979	3	Ruthless Stakes (G3)	1 1/8 mi	Aqueduct	12.50	5	DNF	1:51 2/5	N/A	George Martens	
Apr 21, 1979	3	Allowance race	7 furlongs	Aqueduct	22.10	9	5	1:22 4/5	9 3/4 lengths	Jacinto Vásquez	
May 6, 1979	3	Allowance race	1 1/8 mi	Aqueduct	3.50	6	1	1:51 3/5	(8 lengths)	Jacinto Vásquez	
June 9, 1979	3	Allowance race	1 1/16 mi	Belmont Park	4.90	8	1	1:43 1/5	(3 1/4 lengths)	Jacinto Vásquez	
June 21, 1979	3	Wistful Stakes	1 1/8 mi	Belmont Park	4.30	8	3	1:50 1/5	4 lengths	Jacinto Vásquez	
Jul 15, 1979	3	Garden City Handicap	1 1/4 mi	Belmont Park	3.00	11	6	2:01	6 1/2 lengths	Jacinto Vásquez	
Aug 11, 1979	3	Alabama Stakes (G1)	1 1/4 mi	Saratoga	13.40	5	3	2:01 2/5	5 1/4 lengths	Jean Cruguet	
Nov 14, 1979	3	Allowance race	1 1/8 mi	Aqueduct	3.80	5	2	1:52 3/5	Head	Jean Cruguet	
Nov 22, 1979	3	Allowance race	1 1/16 mi	Aqueduct	1.10	7	1	1:48	(2 lengths)	Jean Cruguet	
Dec 2, 1979	3	Busher Handicap	1 mi	Aqueduct	5.00	11	7	1:38 3/5	9 lengths	Jean Cruguet	
Feb 21, 1980	4	Allowance race	1 1/16 mi	Santa Anita	2.00	6	1	1:45 2/5	(5 1/2 lengths)	Eddie Delahoussaye	
Mar 12, 1980	4	Santa Anita Handicap	1 1/8 mi	Santa Anita	7.80	8	3	1:48 2/5	3 1/2 lengths	Eddie Delahoussaye	
Mar 23, 1980	4	Santa Barbara Handicap (G1)	1 1/4 mi	Santa Anita	3.40	10	5	2:00 2/5	2 3/4 lengths	Eddie Delahoussaye	
Apr 5, 1980	4	Santa Lucia Handicap	1 1/16 mi	Santa Anita	5.80	8	4	1:40 3/5	8 lengths	Bill Shoemaker	
May 4, 1980	4	Gamely Handicap (G2)	1 1/8 mi	Hollywood Park	26.10	12	5	1:47 4/5	3 1/2 lengths	Octavio Ramirez	
May 26, 1980	4	Yerba Buena Handicap (G3)	1 3/8 mi	Golden Gate	3.80	10	1	2:15	(6 lengths)	Francisco Mena	
Dec 22, 1980	4	Allowance race	1 1/16 mi	Calder	5.40	6	1	1:44 1/5	(3 lengths)	Octavio Aviles	
Jan 1, 1981	5	La Prevoyante Handicap	1 1/8 mi	Calder	0.90	11	1	1:47 1/5	(Head)	Octavio Aviles	
Feb 7, 1981	5	Orchid Handicap (G2)	1 1/16 mi	Gulfstream Park	6.90	16	11	1:41 1/5	8 3/4 lengths	Octavio Aviles	
Feb 28, 1981	5	Gulfstream Park Handicap (G1)	1 1/4 mi	Gulfstream Park	12.70	9	7	2:03 1/5	5 3/4 lengths	Jean-Luc Samyn	
Mar 22, 1981	5	Santa Barbara Handicap (G1)	1 1/4 mi	Santa Anita	18.70	9	2	2:01 1/5	Nose	Eddie Delahoussaye	
Apr 19, 1981	5	San Juan Capistrano Invitational Handicap (G1)	1 3/4 mi	Santa Anita	6.60	9	5	2:50 2/5	4 lengths	Eddie Delahoussaye	
May 25, 1981	5	Yerba Buena Handicap (G3)	1 3/8 mi	Golden Gate	1.70	10	1	2:15 4/5	(5 lengths)	Francisco Mena	
Jun 20, 1981	5	New York Handicap (G3)	1 1/4 mi	Belmont Park	3.30	6	1	2:04	(1/2 length)	Angel Cordero Jr.	
Jul 3, 1981	5	Matchmaker Stakes (G2)	1 3/16 mi	Atlantic City	1.80	7	1	1:56	(1 1/4 lengths)	Cash Asmussen	
Jul 25, 1981	5	Sheepshead Bay Handicap (G2)	1 3/8 mi	Belmont Park	1.30	8	3	2:13	4 lengths	Cash Asmussen	
Oct 15, 1981	5	Handicap race	1 1/16 mi	Aqueduct	2.10	8	7	1:41 3/5	11 3/4 lengths	Cash Asmussen	
Oct 25, 1981	5	Long Island Handicap (G2)	1 1/2 mi	Aqueduct	3.70	12	2	2:33	Neck	Angel Cordero Jr.	
Nov 22, 1981	5 (Note: In Japanese reports of the race, Mairzy Doates is occasionally referred to as six years old; until 2001, Japanese horseracing used the kazoedoshi counting system where horses are considered one at birth and become one year older each New Year.)	Japan Cup	2,400 m	Tokyo	15.1	15	1	2:25 3/10	(1 length)	Cash Asmussen	

* Conversion of race distances
Miles	Furlongs	Meters
0.75	6	1,207
0.875	7	1,408
1	8	1,609
1 mi, 70 yd	8.32	1,673
1 1/16	8 1/2	1,710
1 1/8	9	1,811
1 3/16	9 1/2	1,911
1 1/4	10	2,011
1 3/8	11	2,213
1.49	11.93	2,400
1 1/2	12	2,414
1 3/4	14	2,816

== Pedigree ==
Pedigree of Mairzy Doates, bay filly, family: 2-s
Sire Nodouble	Noholme	Star Kingdom	Stardust
Sire Nodouble	Noholme	Star Kingdom	Impromptu
Sire Nodouble	Noholme	Oceana	Colombo
Sire Nodouble	Noholme	Oceana	Orama
Sire Nodouble	Abla-Jay	Double Jay	Balladier
Sire Nodouble	Abla-Jay	Double Jay	Broomshot
Sire Nodouble	Abla-Jay	Ablamucha	Don Bingo
Sire Nodouble	Abla-Jay	Ablamucha	Sweet Betty
Dam Avalanche Lily	T. V. Lark	Indian Hemp	Nasrullah
Dam Avalanche Lily	T. V. Lark	Indian Hemp	Sabzy
Dam Avalanche Lily	T. V. Lark	Miss Larksfly	Heelfly
Dam Avalanche Lily	T. V. Lark	Miss Larksfly	Larksnest
Dam Avalanche Lily	Tumbling	War Admiral	Man o' War
Dam Avalanche Lily	Tumbling	War Admiral	Brushup
Dam Avalanche Lily	Tumbling	Up The Hill	Jacopo
Dam Avalanche Lily	Tumbling	Up The Hill	Gentle Tryst
