= Coretta =

Irish-bred Thoroughbred racehorse

- Sire: Caerleon
- Grandsire: Nijinsky
- Dam: Free At Last
- Damsire: Shirley Heights
- Sex: Mare
- Foaled: 1994
- Country: Ireland
- Colour: Bay
- Breeder: Gerald W. Leigh
- Owner: Gerald W. Leigh
- Trainer: Christophe Clement
- Record: 18: 7-4-4
- Earnings: $748,420

Major wins
- La Prevoyante Handicap (1998, 1999); Long Island Handicap (1998); Orchid Handicap (1999)

Coretta (foaled February 11, 1994 in Ireland) is a Thoroughbred racemare who competed in the United States. She was bred and raced by Gerald W. Leigh, proprietor of England's Eydon Hall Stud. Leigh owned and bred her dam, Free At Last, who was a daughter of the 1978 Epsom and Irish Derby winner, Shirley Heights. A philanthropist with a strong social conscience who was a member of the Council of Management for the Animal Health Trust, Leigh named Free At Last for those words contained in Martin Luther King Jr.'s 1963 speech, "I Have a Dream". Leigh named Free At Last's first foal, Coretta, for King's widow, Coretta Scott King. Leigh later gave another of Free At Last's foals the name of the African American civil rights activist, Rosa Parks.

Coretta's sire was Caerleon, the 1983 Champion Three-Year-Old Colt in France who was a son of the English Triple Crown champion, Nijinsky.

Leigh maintained racing stables in the United Kingdom, France, and the United States. Coretta raced once at age two in England and in 1997 at age three made five starts with her best performance a win in the Breitling Handicap at Newmarket Racecourse under jockey Frankie Dettori.

In 1998 Coretta was sent to the United States where she was conditioned by French trainer Christophe Clement, who is established in the United States. At age four she won Graded stakes races on turf, including the then Grade II Long Island Handicap at Aqueduct Racetrack in New York City and the La Prevoyante Handicap at Florida's Gulfstream Park. In 1999 Coretta won her second consecutive La Prevoyante Handicap as well as the Orchid Handicap. At New York's Belmont Park, she finished second to Soaring Softly in the Grade I Flower Bowl Invitational Handicap. Entered in the inaugural running of the Breeders' Cup Filly & Mare Turf, the parimutuel betting public made Coretta the seventh choice at 16:1 odds. In the 1 3/8 miles (2.2 km) race, she ran near the leaders until the top of the homestretch when she moved into the lead only to be caught near the finish line to finish second again to Soaring Softly.

Retired to broodmare duty, among her matings Leigh bred Coretta two times to Ogden Phipps' stallion Seeking The Gold, naming the foals "Civil Rights" and "Shared Dreams".
