= Bewitch Stakes =

- Class: Grade III
- Location: Keeneland Race Course; Lexington, Kentucky, United States
- Inaugurated: 1962
- Race type: Thoroughbred - Flat racing
- Website: Keeneland

Race information
- Distance: 1 1/2 miles (12 furlongs)
- Surface: Turf
- Track: Left-handed
- Qualification: Fillies & Mares, four-years-old and older
- Weight: 123 lbs with allowances
- Purse: $300,000 (since 2022)

The Bewitch Stakes is a Grade III American Thoroughbred horse race for fillies and mares four-year-olds and older over a distance of 1 1/2 miles on the turf held annually in April at Keeneland Race Course, Lexington, Kentucky during the spring meeting. The event currently offers a purse of $300,000.

== History ==
The race is named for Calumet Farm's great Hall of Fame filly, Bewitch. Bewitch won her first two races as a two-year-old at Keeneland. The first event was on 10 April 1947, a maiden, The Dixiana Purse a four furlong race in which Bewitch won easily. The following week Bewitch won the Thoroughbred Club Dinner Purse equaling the track record in 46 seconds flat for the four furlong distance that was held by Odessa Beulah since 27 April 1937. Bewitch would win her first eight races and later would be voted U.S. Champion Two-Year-Old Filly for 1947. Keeneland honored this fine champion with the running of the inaugural Bewitch Stakes, a two-year-old filly event on closing day of the spring meeting on 24 April 1962 with Bonnie's Girl winning by 3 1/2 lengths in a time of 48 1/5 seconds for the about four furlong distance. Bonnie's Girl would finish second the following year in the Kentucky Oaks which was won by Sally Ship.

In 1965 the distance of the event was set at 4 1/2 furlongs with the extension of the chute which is now known as the Headley Course. The number of two-year-old fillies that would enter the event was high which would enable Keeneland to split the event into divisions. This occurred in 1965, 1966, 1971, 1972 and 1976. The last time the event was held as a two-year-old stakes race was in 1978.

In 1979 the event was held with conditions for fillies and mares that are four years old or older and the distance was set at 1 1/16 miles.

In 1982 the American Graded Stakes Committee upgraded the race to its current Grade III status.

Between 1979 and 1985 when the event was held on the dirt track three winners of the race had earlier had won the Apple Blossom Handicap at Oaklawn Park – Miss Baja scored a major upset at Oaklawn in 1979, confirmed her victory by winning by the Bewitch Stakes by 8 1/2 lengths, Bold 'n Determined in 1981 and Heatherten in 1984.

Keeneland installed a new turf track in the fall of 1985 and in the following spring meeting (1986) the event was moved as was the Elkhorn Stakes (for all horses) and scheduled as a 1 1/8 miles event.

In 1995 the distance of the event was increased to 1 1/2 miles.

The event was not held 2020 during Keeneland's spring meeting which was moved to July and shortened due to the COVID-19 pandemic in the United States.

== Records ==
Speed record

- 1 1/2 miles turf: 2:27.54 – Bursting Forth (1999)
- 1 1/8 miles turf: 1:48.37 – La Gueriere (1992)
- 1 1/8 miles dirt: 1:43.00 – Miss Baja (1979), Jolie Dutch (1980)
- 4 1/2 furlongs dirt: 0:51.00 – Royalty Note (1968)

Margins

- 9 lengths – Shore (1966), Forever After All (2025)

Most wins:

- 3 – War Like Goddess (2021, 2022, 2023)

Most wins by a jockey

- 6 – Pat Day (1983, 1988, 1991, 1994, 1995, 1997)

Most wins by an owner

- 3 – George Krikorian (2021, 2022, 2023)

Most wins by a trainer

- 6 – William I. Mott (1984, 1989, 1993, 2021, 2022, 2023)

== Winners ==
Year	Winner	Age	Jockey	Trainer	Owner	Distance	Time	Purse	Grade	Ref
2026	Speed Shopper	5	John R. Velazquez	William Walden	Gary Barber, Bridlewood Farm & Eclipse Thoroughbred Partners	1 1/2 miles	2:29.00	$348,750	III	
2025	Forever After All	6	Irad Ortiz Jr.	Brendan P. Walsh	Dixiana Farms	1 1/2 miles	2:35.56	$319,500	III	
2024	Chop Chop	4	Axel Concepcion	Brad H. Cox	Selective, LLC	1 1/2 miles	2:27.80	$290,125	III	
2023	War Like Goddess	6	Joel Rosario	William I. Mott	George Krikorian	1 1/2 miles	2:32.11	$297,500	III	
2022	War Like Goddess	5	Joel Rosario	William I. Mott	George Krikorian	1 1/2 miles	2:31.26	$298,500	III	
2021	War Like Goddess	4	Julien R. Leparoux	William I. Mott	George Krikorian	1 1/2 miles	2:29.21	$150,000	III	
2020	Race not held									
2019	Ickymasho (GB)	7	Jose L. Ortiz	Roger L. Attfield	Triton Stable	1 1/2 miles	2:30.02	$150,000	III	
2018	Mom's On Strike	5	Adam Beschizza	Joe Sharp	Carl R. Moore Management & Brad Grady	1 1/2 miles	2:30.02	$150,000	III	
2017	Quiet Business	4	Brian Hernandez Jr.	George R. Arnold II	Calumet Farm	1 1/2 miles	2:31.50	$150,000	III	
2016	Olorda (GER)	4	Julien R. Leparoux	Chad C. Brown	Martin S. Schwartz	1 1/2 miles	2:30.09	$150,000	III	
2015	† Cay Dancer (GB)	4	Joel Rosario	Chad C. Brown	Highclere America, Barnett	1 1/2 miles	2:30.28	$149,667	III	
2014	Inimitable Romanee	6	Alan Garcia	H. Graham Motion	Gallagher's Stud	1 1/2 miles	2:32.29	$150,000	III	
2013	Strathnaver (GB)	4	Joel Rosario	H. Graham Motion	Andrew Stone	1 1/2 miles	2:30.65	$150,000	III	
2012	Upperline	5	James Graham	Michael Stidham	Michael Stidham, John H. Adger, Stone Farm & Oakcrest Farm	1 1/2 miles	2:33.28	$150,000	III	
2011	Keertana	5	Jose Lezcano	Thomas F. Proctor	Barbara Hunter	1 1/2 miles	2:33.08	$150,000	III	
2010	Lady Shakespeare	4	John R. Velazquez	Roger L. Attfield	Charles E. Fipke	1 1/2 miles	2:31.42	$150,000	III	
2009	Winter View	5	Julien R. Leparoux	Jonathan E. Sheppard	Augustin Stable	1 1/2 miles	2:34.11	$150,000	III	
2008	Communique	4	Garrett K. Gomez	George R. Arnold II	G. Watts Humphrey Jr.	1 1/2 miles	2:28.91	$150,000	III	
2007	Safari Queen (ARG)	5	John R. Velazquez	Todd A. Pletcher	Arindel Farm	1 1/2 miles	2:28.75	$150,000	III	
2006	Noble Stella (GER)	5	Edgar S. Prado	Roger L. Attfield	Gary A. Tanaka	1 1/2 miles	2:33.15	$107,400	III	
2005	Angara (GB)	4	Gary L. Stevens	Patrick L. Biancone	Martin S. Schwartz	1 1/2 miles	2:36.24	$109,300	III	
2004	Meridiana (GER)	4	Edgar S. Prado	Christophe Clement	Sarah & Jon Kelly	1 1/2 miles	2:31.05	$113,400	III	
2003	Lilac Queen (GER)	5	Jerry D. Bailey	Robert J. Frankel	Gary A. Tanaka	1 1/2 miles	2:29.70	$112,100	III	
2002	Sweetest Thing	4	Mark Guidry	Roger L. Attfield	Roger L. Attfield, Michael Canino & William Werner	1 1/2 miles	2:31.97	$110,700	III	
2001	Keemoon (FR)	5	Jerry D. Bailey	Neil D. Drysdale	Henry E. Pabst	1 1/2 miles	2:30.28	$200,000	III	
2000	The Seven Seas	4	Alex O. Solis	Robert J. Frankel	Charles Kenis	1 1/2 miles	2:29.20	$113,100	III	
1999	Bursting Forth	5	Jorge F. Chavez	H. Graham Motion	Sam Huff	1 1/2 miles	2:27.54	$110,900	III	
1998	Maxzene	5	Jose A. Santos	Thomas J. Skiffington	Sekiguchi Fusao	1 1/2 miles	2:30.50	$112,300	III	
1997	Cymbala (FR)	4	Pat Day	Neil J. Howard	William S. Farish III, George Bolton & J. S. Reynolds	1 1/2 miles	2:28.87	$111,500	III	
1996	Memories (IRE)	5	Shane Sellers	Burk Kessinger Jr.	New Phoenix Stable & Alvin Haynes	1 1/2 miles	2:30.14	$106,500	III	
1995	Market Booster	6	Pat Day	D. Wayne Lukas	Moyglare Stud	1 1/2 miles	2:29.33	$81,825	III	
1994	Freewheel	5	Pat Day	Neil J. Howard	William S. Farish III & E. J. Hudson	1 1/8 miles	1:50.24	$82,050	III	
1993	Miss Lenora	4	Julie Krone	William I. Mott	Allen E. Paulson	1 1/8 miles	1:50.60	$82,850	III	
1992	La Gueriere	4	Brian Dale Peck	A. Peter Perkins	Wimborne Farm	1 1/8 miles	1:48.37	$83,750	III	
1991	Miss Unnameable	7	Pat Day	D. Wayne Lukas	Leonard D. Mathis	1 1/8 miles	1:50.02	$86,500	III	
1990	Coolawin	4	Jerry D. Bailey	Carl A. Nafzger	Jim Tafel	1 1/8 miles	1:49.20	$83,150	III	
1989	Gaily Gaily (IRE)	6	Julie Krone	William I. Mott	Diana M. Firestone	1 1/8 miles	1:50.00	$82,850	III	
1988	Beauty Cream	5	Pat Day	Patrick C. Clark	Warren N. Moore	1 1/8 miles	1:51.60	$86,550	III	
1987	Gerrie Singer	6	Ricky Frazier	Jeff Trosclair	John J. Petrie	1 1/8 miles	1.52.60	$61,125	III	
1986	Devalois (FR)	4	Eddie Maple	Woodford C. Stephens	Mrs. Alec Head	1 1/8 miles	1:54.00	$69,900	III	
1985	Sintra	4	K. Keith Allen	Steven C. Penrod	Cherry Valley Farm	1 1/16 miles	1:43.40	$63,275	III	
1984	Heatherten	5	Sam Maple	William I. Mott	John A. Franks	1 1/16 miles	1:45.80	$58,350	III	
1983	Try Something New	4	Pat Day	Claude R. McGaughey III	John A. Bell III	1 1/16 miles	1:44.40	$56,925	III	
1982	Expressive Dance	4	Don Brumfield	Bertram R. Firestone	Diana M. Firestone	1 1/16 miles	1:43.40	$56,025	III	
1981	Bold 'n Determined	4	Eddie Delahoussaye	Neil D. Drysdale	Saron Stable	1 1/16 miles	1:43.80	$58,825		
1980	Jolie Dutch	4	Randy Romero	Anthony J. Lombardi	Susan B. Fisher	1 1/16 miles	1:43.00	$45,875		
1979	Miss Baja	4	Eddie Maple	Joseph B. Cantey	Lockhart Spears	1 1/16 miles	1:43.00	$35,825		
1978	Twenty One Inch	2	Eddie Delahoussaye	Anthony Basile	Bwamazon Farm (Millard Waldheim)	4 1/2 furlongs	0:52.60	$18,225		
1977	Crystalan	2	Garth Patterson	Glenn L. Hild	Raymond Parker	4 1/2 furlongs	0:53.00	$18,380		
1976	Olden	2	Robert Breen	Lloyd P. Tate	James H. Stone	4 1/2 furlongs	0:51.40	$16,970		Division 1
1976	Fun and Tears	2	Larry Melancon	Douglas M. Davis Jr.	Patricia Blass	4 1/2 furlongs	0:51.40	$17,370		Division 2
1975	Pink Jade	2	Eddie Delahoussaye	John Ngai Jr.	Hoi Toi Stable	4 1/2 furlongs	0:51.60	$18,675		
1974	Dancing Home	2	Alan Patterson	Don Breashear	J. F. Smith	4 1/2 furlongs	0:53.60	$18,143		Division 1
1974	Secret's Out	2	Don Brumfield	James E. Picou	Marcia Lou Schott	4 1/2 furlongs	0:51.40	$18,042		Division 2
1973	Me and Connie	2	Jimmy Nichols	Douglas M. Davis Jr.	Patricia Blass	4 1/2 furlongs	0:52.40	$19,390		
1972	Gallant Davelle	2	Jimmy Nichols	Douglas M. Davis Jr.	George M. Holtsinger	4 1/2 furlongs	0:52.40	$20,825		Division 1
1972	Bosuns Strike	2	Anthony DeSpirito	Douglas M. Davis Jr.	Joan Turner	4 1/2 furlongs	0:53.20	$21,125		Division 2
1971	Sidle	2	David Kassen	Stanley M. Rieser	Barbara Hunter	4 1/2 furlongs	0:52.20	$19,950		Division 1
1971	Cautious Bidder	2	Jimmy Nichols	Larry Robideaux Jr.	Larry Robideaux Jr.	4 1/2 furlongs	0:52:00	$20,500		Division 2
1970	Fancy Road	2	Nelson Menard	Roy J. Gillem	Dreabon Copelan	4 1/2 furlongs	0:52.20	$21,700		
1969	Little Tudor	2	David E. Whited	Carter Thornton	Carter Thornton	4 1/2 furlongs	0:52.80	$23,350		
1968	Royalty Note	2	Michael Manganello	Thomas H. Stevens Sr.	James O. Alston	4 1/2 furlongs	0:51.00	$23,250		
1967	Jet To Market	2	Grady Overton	David F. Erb	Roger W. Wilson & Mrs. Thomas Phillip Hull Jr.	4 1/2 furlongs	0:51.60	$13,925		
1966	Shore	2	Jimmy Nichols	Harry Trotsek	Claiborne Farm	4 1/2 furlongs	0:52:00	$11,850		Division 1
1966	Furl Sail	2	Earlie Fires	John L. Winans	Mrs. Edwin K. Thomas	4 1/2 furlongs	0:52.60	$11,950		Division 2
1965	Justakiss	2	Kenny Knapp	Stanley M. Rieser	Clifford Lussky	4 1/2 furlongs	0:53.00	$12,587		Division 1
1965	Ole Liz	2	Bill Shoemaker	Henry Forrest	Henry Forrest & Elton Gordon	4 1/2 furlongs	0:52:40	$12,388		Division 2
1964	Mississippi Mama	2	Ronnie Baldwin	Douglas M. Davis Jr.	Michael & Douglas M. Davis Jr.	abt. 4 furlongs	0:48.20	$13,650		
1963	Royal Bund	2	Avelino Gomez	Frank E. Cundall	Bwamazon Farm (Millard Waldheim)	abt. 4 furlongs	0:49.40	$13,150		
1962	Bonnies Girl	2	Clarence Meaux	E. Thurston Colglazier	J. H. Riedinger	abt. 4 furlongs	0:48.20	$15,025		

Legend:
Dirt Turf
Notes:
§ Ran as an entry
† In the 2015 running of the event Kitten's Point was first past the post and wagering was paid out as the winner, however the horse returned a positive swab for methocarbamol (Robaxin) and consequently was disqualified from the prizemoney and was placed 14th (last). Cay Dancer (GB) was declared the official winner of the event.

== See also ==
- List of American and Canadian Graded races
