= War Like Goddess =

American racehorse

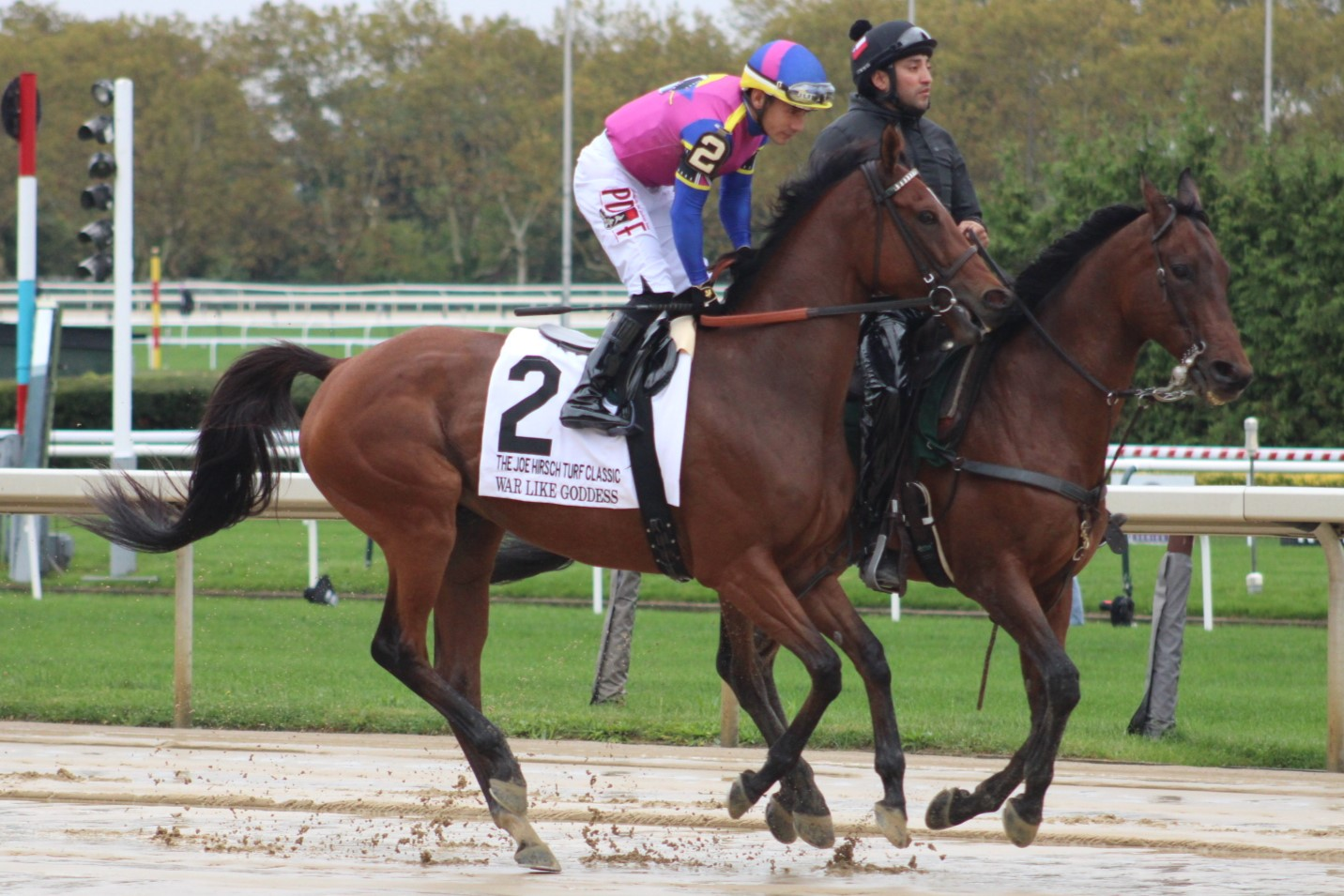
- War Like Goddess warming up before winning her second consecutive Joe Hirsch Turf Classic
- Sire: English Channel
- Grandsire: Smart Strike (Canada)
- Dam: Misty North
- Damsire: North Light (IRE)
- Sex: Mare
- Foaled: April 14, 2017
- Country: United States
- Color: Bay
- Breeder: Calumet Farm
- Owner: George Krikorian
- Trainer: William I. Mott
- Record: 23 : 12 - 4 - 3
- Earnings: US$3,035,184

Major wins
- Orchid Stakes (2021); Bewitch Stakes (2021, 2022, 2023); Glens Falls Stakes (2021, 2022); Flower Bowl Stakes (2021); Joe Hirsch Turf Classic (2022, 2023); Robert G. Dick Memorial Stakes (2024)
- Last updated on November 3, 2024

War Like Goddess (foaled April 14, 2017) is an American multiple Graded Stakes winning Thoroughbred racehorse. Her graded wins include the Grade I Flower Bowl Stakes in 2021 the Grade II Glens Falls Stakes twice (2021 and 2022) at Saratoga Race Course all of which are long-distance turf events.

== Background ==
War Like Goddess is a bay filly who was bred in Kentucky by Calumet Farm and is owned by cinema mogul George Krikorian. She was sired by English Channel, who was the US Champion Male Turf Horse in 2007 and leading sire of turf horses in North America. War Like Goddess is out of the 2004 English Derby winner North Light mare Misty North who has two winners out of three foals to race. Her unraced foals include three-year-old filly Thecradlewillrock (Red Rocks) and two-year-old colt North of Bali (Bal a Bali).

War Like Goddess has changed hands multiple times. First selling as a weanling to Falcon L & L Stables/Lawrence Hobson from the Bluegrass Thoroughbred Services consignment at the 2017 Keeneland November Breeding Stock Sale for $1,200, she was sold again in 2019 at the Ocala Breeders' Sales Company's June Two-Year-Olds & Horses of Racing Age Sale for $30,000 to H N D Bloodstock from the Hemingway Racing & Training Stables consignment.

War Like Goddess is trained by U.S. Racing Hall of Fame trainer William I. Mott.

== Racing career ==
=== 2020: three-year-old season ===
War Like Goddess made her debut on September 26 in a maiden special weight event for fillies and mares ages three and older at Churchill Downs. She was the only first-time starter in the field of nine. She rated far off of the pace before swinging five wide turning for home, then shifted a bit inwards with a furlong to run and drove past the leader Leah Chase within the last 100 yards to win by 3/4 length in a time 1:51.21.

On October 28, War Like Goddess made her last start of the season in an allowance race for fillies and mares three and older over a distance of 11 furlongs at Churchill Downs. Again she was slow to begin from the wide post 10, trailing the field while shifting down to the two path around the first turn. War Like Goddess saved ground around the second and third turns, skimming the rail to advance inside turning for home. She then produced a blitz along the rail in upper stretch, drew clear approaching the furlong pole, and was ridden out to the wire to win by 3 1/4 lengths in a time of 1:43.52.

=== 2021: four-year-old season ===
After a four-month break, War Like Goddess made her first appearance of the season in the Grade III The Very One Stakes at Gulfstream Park. She broke unhurried, trailing the field along the inside around both turns, swung six wide entering the lane, and rallied but failed to reach contention, finishing fifth to Antoinette, who led all the way.

Staying in Florida, War Like Goddess competed on March 27 in the GIII Orchid Stakes, winning by a nose over 11/10 favorite Always Shopping. She saved ground unhurried for a mile, moving out five wide approaching the stretch, and with a drive was up outside Always Shopping in the final strides.

On April 23 at Keeneland in the Grade III Bewitch Stakes, War Like Goddess started as the 13/10 favorite in a field of eleven. She saved ground while rating far off of the pace in ninth early as Three Flamingos led. At the quarter pole, she was sixth, then she tipped off of the rail turning for home before swinging five wide in the stretch, passing the leaders at the furlong pole and drawing clear approaching the final 100 yards. Jockey Julien Leparoux commented after the race, "I wanted to make sure I kept my position (early in the race). She was traveling very good for me. I felt like I was a winner the whole way around. When I asked her, she kicked on very nicely."

Trainer Mott indicated, "We freshened her up a bit (3 months) after her last race (Bewitch) and brought her back today (for the Grade II Glens Falls Stakes) and she moved forward for us and beat a nice bunch of fillies." In the Glens Falls, War Like Goddess and jockey Julien Leparoux were last in the field of seven after Dalika stole away to a four-length lead through a mile in 1:38.84. On the turn for home, however, they moved widest and fastest, taking a short lead at the eighth pole and drawing clear in completing the 12 furlongs in 2:27.55 on firm turf.

On September 4, War Like Goddess took her fourth consecutive graded stakes victory and first Grade 1 in the $600,000 Flower Bowl Stakes at Saratoga Race Course. Jockey Julien Leparoux settled her along the inside about five to six lengths off the pace early. They tracked fractions set by La Signare, who opened up with splits of :24.71, :48.83, 1:13.66, and 1:37.40 on the firm course. Great Island followed in second. War Like Goddess was switched to the outside by Leparoux in the upper stretch. She then passed her rivals and drew clear to complete the 1 3/8-mile contest in 2:13.07. She was the 2–5 favorite.

In her last start of the year, she started as the 23/10 favorite in the Breeders' Cup Filly & Mare Turf at Del Mar but fell short of victory after taking the lead about 300 yards from home when passed by the Japanese-owned Champion Mare Loves Only You and French-bred My Sister Nat. The third-place finish for War Like Goddess ended a four-race win streak and marked her second career loss in eight starts. Mott said, "She moved a little quick around that final turn. (Leparoux) said that when he tipped her out, she got pretty aggressive. She took off with him, but no big excuse. She maybe got to the lead a little soon."

=== 2022: five-year-old season ===
After nearly a six-month break, War Like Goddess launched her season on April 29 at Keeneland in the GIII Bewitch Stakes, an event she won in 2021. She was sent off at 1–5 odds as the lone grade 1 winner in the field of five. Eclipse Award-winning jockey Joel Rosario opted to keep late-running War Like Goddess closer than usual as she tracked from third, occasionally fighting restraint. Turning for home, she was hemmed in for several strides by 2022 Orchid Stakes winner Family Way. War Like Goddess squeezed past Breeze Rider and Family Way, quickly opening up a clear advantage on her way to a 1 3/4-length victory, completing the 1 1/2 miles in 2:31.26 on firm turf.

On August 6, War Like Goddess returned to Saratoga Race Course to run in the GII Glens Falls Stakes over her prime distance of 1 1/2 miles. Sent off as the 2/5 odds-on favorite under jockey Joel Rosario, she stayed in striking position from fourth for the first half of the race. As the seven-horse field went in fractions of :25.26, :51.53, 1:17.51, 1:42.33, and 2:06.65, War Like Goddess rounded the final turn and began her charge, taking command in the stretch to move into first, winning the race on a firm turf course by 1 1/4 lengths in 2:29.33. Mott said that she could next start at Saratoga either in the Flower Bowl Stakes or could challenge males in the Resorts World Casino Sword Dancer Stakes.

On September 3, War Like Goddess returned to Saratoga to face five other competitors in the downgraded GII Flower Bowl Stakes, an event she had won the previous season. Starting as the 1/5 favorite, she saved ground near the rear of the field under a firm hold through dawdling splits, was four wide at the quarter pole, and was roused when straightened away into upper stretch, coming through a seam at the three-sixteenths and closing to finish second by a neck to German-bred Virginia Joy. Jockey Joel Rosario commented after the event, "She came flying. I don't know how fast she came home, but she was rolling. She got right to (Virginia Joy's) hip, and the other one had something left."

Connections of War Like Goddess were contemplating entering her in the E.P. Taylor Stakes at Woodbine Racecourse against females, but the distance of 1 1/4 miles was considered to be short, and trainer Bill Mott opted to enter her in the Grade I Joe Hirsch Turf Classic at Aqueduct, which was longer by a quarter of a mile and had male competition. The last female to win the Joe Hirsch was All Along in 1983 when the stakes was last contested at Aqueduct. Starting as the 4/5 favorite, War Like Goddess was given a patient, stalking ride by Jose Lezcano. They tracked behind pacesetter Bye Bye Melvin and longshot Astronaut until the top of the stretch, where she rolled to the lead to win by 2 3/4 lengths in a time of 2:27.29. .

In her next start in the Breeders' Cup Turf at Keeneland, War Like Goddess finished third to the Irish-bred Rebel's Romance, who set a track record in his victory.

== Statistics ==
Date	Distance	Race	Grade	Track	Odds	Field	Finish	Winning Time	Winning (Losing) Margin	Jockey	Ref
2020 – three-year-old season
Sep 26, 2020	1 1/8 miles	Maiden Special Weight		Churchill Downs	4.50	9	1	1:51.21	3/4 length	Julien Leparoux	
Oct 28, 2020	1 3/8 miles	Allowance		Churchill Downs	6.40	10	1	1:43.52	3 1/4 lengths	James Graham	
2021 – four-year-old season
Feb 27, 2021	1 3/16 miles	The Very One Stakes	III	Gulfstream Park	5.80	9	5	1:53.70	(3 1/4 lengths)	Jose L. Ortiz	
Mar 27, 2021	1 3/8 miles	Orchid Stakes	III	Gulfstream Park	5.60	9	1	2:12.34	nose	Julien Leparoux	
Apr 23, 2021	1 1/2 miles	Bewitch Stakes	III	Keeneland	1.30*	11	1	2:29.21	3 3/4 lengths	Julien Leparoux	
Aug 7, 2021	1 1/2 miles	Glens Falls Stakes	II	Saratoga	0.85*	7	1	2:27.55	3 1/4 lengths	Julien Leparoux	
Sep 4, 2021	1 3/8 miles	Flower Bowl Stakes	I	Saratoga	0.40*	6	1	2:13.07	2 1/4 lengths	Julien Leparoux	
Nov 6, 2021	1 3/8 miles	Breeders' Cup Filly and Mare Turf	I	Del Mar	2.30*	12	3	2:13.87	(1/2 length)	Julien Leparoux	
2022 – five-year-old season
Apr 29, 2022	1 1/2 miles	Bewitch Stakes	III	Keeneland	0.20*	5	1	2:31.26	1 3/4 lengths	Joel Rosario	
Aug 6, 2022	1 1/2 miles	Glens Falls Stakes	II	Saratoga	0.40*	7	1	2:29.33	1 1/4 lengths	Joel Rosario	
Sep 3, 2022	1 3/8 miles	Flower Bowl Stakes	II	Saratoga	0.20*	6	2	2:19.51	(neck)	Joel Rosario	
Oct 8, 2022	1 1/2 miles	Joe Hirsch Turf Classic (Note: The Joe Hirsch Turf Classic is an event without sex restriction. War Like Goddess faced male horses)	I	Aqueduct	0.95*	7	1	2:27.29	2 3/4 lengths	Jose Lezcano	
Nov 6, 2022	1 1/2 miles	Breeders' Cup Turf (Note: The Breeders' Cup Turf is an event without sex restriction. War Like Goddess faced male horses)	I	Keeneland	3.47	13	3	2:26.35 (Note: The winner of the Breeders' Cup Turf, Rebel's Romance set a new track record for the distance)	(3 lengths)	Joel Rosario	
2023 – six-year-old season
Apr 28, 2023	1 1/2 miles	Bewitch Stakes	III	Keeneland	0.50*	5	1	2:32.11	1 1/2 lengths	Joel Rosario	
Jun 9, 2023	1 1/4 miles	New York Stakes	I	Belmont Park	0.75*	7	6	2:02.12	(2 3/4 lengths)	Joel Rosario	
Aug 3, 2023	1 1/2 miles	Glens Falls Stakes	II	Saratoga	0.50*	7	2	2:27.05	(neck)	Joel Rosario	
Oct 7, 2023	1 1/2 miles	Joe Hirsch Turf Classic	I	Aqueduct	3.80	8	1	2:32.86 (Note: War Like Goddess set a new track record for the distance on the outer turf track at Aqueduct)	4 1/2 lengths	Junior Alvarado	
Nov 4, 2023	1 1/2 miles	Breeders' Cup Turf	I	Santa Anita	3.40	11	7	2:24.30	(4 1/4 lengths)	Junior Alvarado	
2024 – seven-year-old season
Jun 7, 2024	1 3/16 miles	New York Stakes	I	Saratoga	4.60	13	3	1:52.29	(3 1/4 lengths)	Junior Alvarado	
Jul 7, 2024	1 3/8 miles	Robert G. Dick Memorial Stakes	III	Delaware Park	1.00*	6	1	2:16.60	1 length	Junior Alvarado	
Aug 31, 2024	1 3/8 miles	Flower Bowl Stakes	II	Saratoga	1.30*	7	2	2:18.97	(1 1/2 lengths)	Junior Alvarado	
Oct 7, 2024	1 1/2 miles	Joe Hirsch Turf Classic	I	Aqueduct	1.70	5	2	2:32.22	(1/2 length)	Junior Alvarado	
Nov 2, 2024	1 3/8 miles	Breeders' Cup Filly & Mare Turf	I	Del Mar	4.90	12	5	2:14.95	(2 1/4 lengths}	Junior Alvarado	

Legend:
Turf Dirt
Notes:
An (*) asterisk after the odds means War Like Goddess was the post-time favorite.

== Pedigree ==
Pedigree of War Like Goddess, bay mare, 2017
Sire English Channel (2002)	Smart Strike (CAN) (1992)	Mr. Prospector (1970)	Raise a Native (1961)
Sire English Channel (2002)	Smart Strike (CAN) (1992)	Mr. Prospector (1970)	Gold Digger (1962)
Sire English Channel (2002)	Smart Strike (CAN) (1992)	Classy 'n Smart (CAN) (1981)	Smarten (CAN) (1976)
Sire English Channel (2002)	Smart Strike (CAN) (1992)	Classy 'n Smart (CAN) (1981)	No Class (CAN) (1974)
Sire English Channel (2002)	Belva (1998)	Theatrical (IRE) (1982)	Nureyev (1977)
Sire English Channel (2002)	Belva (1998)	Theatrical (IRE) (1982)	Tree of Knowledge (IRE) (1977)
Sire English Channel (2002)	Belva (1998)	Committed (1980)	Hagley (1967)
Sire English Channel (2002)	Belva (1998)	Committed (1980)	Mistinguette (1975)
Dam Misty North (2010)	North Light (IRE) (2001)	Danehill (1986)	Danzig (1977)
Dam Misty North (2010)	North Light (IRE) (2001)	Danehill (1986)	Rayzana (1981)
Dam Misty North (2010)	North Light (IRE) (2001)	Sought Out (IRE) (1988)	Rainbow Quest (1981)
Dam Misty North (2010)	North Light (IRE) (2001)	Sought Out (IRE) (1988)	Edinburgh (GB) (1974)
Dam Misty North (2010)	Misty Gallop (2001)	Victory Gallop (CAN) (1995)	Cryptoclearance (1984)
Dam Misty North (2010)	Misty Gallop (2001)	Victory Gallop (CAN) (1995)	Victorious Lil (1989)
Dam Misty North (2010)	Misty Gallop (2001)	Romanette (1982)	Alleged (1974)
Dam Misty North (2010)	Misty Gallop (2001)	Romanette (1982)	Laughing Bridge (1972) (family 22-c)
