= Yerba Buena Stakes =

- Class: Discontinued stakes
- Location: Golden Gate Fields, Albany, California, USA
- Inaugurated: 1973–2009
- Race type: Thoroughbred – Flat racing

Race information
- Distance: 1 3/8 miles (11 furlongs)
- Surface: Turf
- Track: Grass, left-handed
- Qualification: Three-years-old & up

The Yerba Buena Stakes is a discontinued race for Thoroughbred fillies and mares age three and older. It was run on turf at Golden Gate Fields race track in Albany, California from 1973 through 2000 and again from 2005 through 2009. Between 2001 through 2004 the race was hosted by Bay Meadows Racetrack in San Mateo, California.

It was raced as the Yerba Buena Handicap from inception in 1973 through 2006.

== Records ==
Speed record: (at 1 3/8 miles)

- 2:14.40 – Magdelaine (1988)

Most wins:

- 2 – Star Ball (1977, 1978)
- 2 – Mairzy Doates (1980, 1981)

Most wins by a jockey:

- 4 – Russell Baze (1992, 1995, 2002, 2005)

Most wins by a trainer:

- 4 – Ben Cecil (1996, 1998, 2006, 2009)

Most wins by an owner:

- 4 – Gary A. Tanaka (1993, 1995, 2002, 2006)

== Winners ==
Equibase Yerba Buena Stakes history:

Year	Winner	Age	Jockey	Trainer	Owner	Dist. (Miles)	Time	Purse$	Gr.
2009	Restless Soul	5	Chad Schvaneveldt	Ben Cecil	Ben Cecil, James McCalmont, et al.	13/8 M	2:20.49	$75,000	L
2008	Wild Promises	4	David G. Lopez	Gregory G. Gilchrist	Harry J. Aleo	13/8 M	2:17.28	$75,000	L
2007	Mabadi	4	Joel Rosario	Sanford H. Shulman	Ronald L. Charles/Clear Valley Stable	13/8 M	2:17.87	$75,000	L
2006	Hallowed Dream	4	Dennis Carr	Ben Cecil	Gary A. Tanaka	11/8 M	1:47.76	$125,000	G3
2005	Pickle	4	Russell Baze	Sanford H. Shulman	Ronald L. Charles/Clear Valley Stable	11/16 M	1:41.72	$100,000	G3
2004	A B Noodle	5	Joe M. Castro	Charles J. Jenda	Amity & Bench	11/8 M (±)	1:46.66	$125,000	G3
2003	Chiming	5	Corey Nakatani	Robert J. Frankel	Castleton Lyons	11/8 M (±)	1:45.41	$150,000	G3
2002	Peu a Peu	4	Russell Baze	Robert J. Frankel	Gary A. Tanaka	13/8 M	2:16.39	$150,000	G3
2001	Janet	4	David Flores	Darrell Vienna	Red Baron's Farm	13/8 M	2:17.09	$200,000	G3
2000	Gleefully	4	Rafael Meza	J. Eric Kruljac	Carl I. Brown	13/8 M	2:15.99	$200,000	G3
1999	Blending Element	6	Garrett Gomez	Carla A. Gaines	Warren B. Williamson	13/8 M	2:17.26	$200,000	G3
1998	Miss Universa	5	Pedro Mercado	Ben Cecil	Norman Cheng	13/8 M	2:15.72	$125,000	G3
1997	De Puntillas	5	Victor Espinoza	Robert B. Hess, Jr.	A. Jansen, J. Scibelli, M. Sigband	11/16 M	1:46.71	$100,000	G3
1996	Fanjica	4	Dennis Carr	Ben Cecil	Gary A. Tanaka	13/8 M	2:17.42	$100,000	G3
1995	Work the Crowd	4	Russell Baze	Gregory G. Gilchrist	Harris Farms, Inc. & Norma Foster Maddy	11/8 M	1:49.27	$125,000	G3
1994	Ask Anita	4	Vann Belvoir	Rodney Rash	Robert Spiegel	13/8 M	2:15.55	$100,000	G3
1993	Party Cited	4	Ronald J. Warren, Jr.	Rodney Rash	Gary A. Tanaka	13/8 M	2:15.11	$100,000	G3
1992	Flaming Torch	5	Russell Baze	Robert J. Frankel	Juddmonte Farms	13/8 M	2:16.26	$150,000	L
1991	Free At Last	4	Ron Hansen	Neil D. Drysdale	Gerald W. Leigh	13/8 M	2:15.10	$150,000	L
1990	Petite Ile	4	Corey Black	Edwin J. Gregson	Jean-Francois Malle	13/8 M	2:15.60	$150,000	L
1989	Brown Bess	7	Jack Kaenel	Charles J. Jenda	Calbourne Farm	13/8 M	2:15.60	$150,000	G3
1988	Magdelaine	5	Timothy Doocy	Terry R. Knight	Carmen Coosa	13/8 M	2:14.40	$150,000	G3
1987	Ivor's Image	4	Chris McCarron	John Gosden	Simon Fraser	11/2 M	2:29.60	$150,000	G3
1986	Scythe	5	Thomas Chapman	George D. Hartstone	Robert S. Folsom	11/2 M	2:32.20	$150,000	G3
1985	Salt Spring	6	Thomas Chapman	Henry M. Moreno	Gayno Stables	11/2 M	2:30.20	$150,000	G3
1984	Fact Finder	5	Marco Castaneda	Vincent Clyne	Nelson Bunker Hunt	11/2 M	2:30.20	$150,000	G3
1983	Dilmoun	4	Joseph J. Steiner	Thomas Ray Bell II	Bell Bloodstock Co.	11/2 M	2:31.60	$75,000	G2
1982	Sangue	4	Thomas Chapman	Henry M. Moreno	R. Charlene Parks	13/8 M	2:16.40	$75,000	G2
1981	Mairzy Doates	5	Francisco Mena	John W. Fulton	Arno D. Schefler	13/8 M	2:15.80	$75,000	G3
1980	Mairzy Doates	4	Francisco Mena	Michael Whittingham	Arno D. Schefler	13/8 M	2:15.00	$60,000	G3
1979	Race not held								
1978	Star Ball	6	Darrel McHargue	Jaime Villagomez	John & Donald Valpredo	13/8 M	2:13.60	$60,000	G3
1977	Star Ball	5	J. Buenaventura Vargas	Jaime Villagomez	John & Donald Valpredo	13/8 M	2:14.80	$45,000	L
1976	Our First Delight	4	Enrique Munoz	Jerry M. Fanning	Meryl Ann Tanz	13/8 M	2:16.40	$30,000	L
1975	Joli Vert	4	Frank Olivares	Thomas A. Pratt	Howard C. Wright & THomas A. Pratt	13/8 M	2:16.80	$30,000	L
1974	Merry Madeleine	4	Francisco Mena	Kathy Nikkei	John G. Canty & Alexis Lapeyre	11/4 M	2:31.40	$30,000	NGS
1973	Live Forever	4	Juan Gonzalez	not yet found	Gen. Winston W. Kratz	13/8 M	2:19.60	$20,000	NGS
