= Robert G. Dick Memorial Stakes =

American thoroughbred race

- Class: Grade III
- Location: Delaware Park
- Inaugurated: 1997
- Race type: Thoroughbred – Flat racing
- Website: Delaware Park

Race information
- Distance: 1 3/8 miles
- Surface: Turf
- Track: Right-handed (inner course)
- Qualification: Fillies & Mares, three-years-old & older
- Weight: Base weights with allowances: 4-year-olds and up: 124 lbs. 3-year-olds: 119 lbs.
- Purse: $250,000 (2023)

The Robert G. Dick Memorial Stakes is a Grade III American Thoroughbred horse race for fillies and mares age three and older run over a distance of 1 3/8 miles on the turf held annually in July at Delaware Park in Stanton, Delaware.

== History ==
The event was inaugurated on 9 November 1997 as the Robert G. Dick Memorial Handicap and was won by Double Stake who led all the way in a time of 1:52 3/5 on a muddy dirt track for the 1 1/8 mile distance. The event is named after the former chairman of the Delaware Thoroughbred Racing Commission and who served in the capacity of commissioner for 18 years and chairman of that body from 1990 until his retirement in 1993.

Since 1998 the event has been held on the turf track except in 2013 when inclement weather moved the event to the dirt track.

The event was classified as Grade III in 2008 and has held this class since except in 2013 when the event was held on the dirt track.

Between 1999 and 2007 the event include Breeders' Cup incentives which were reflected in the name of the event.

== Records ==
Speed record:

- 1 3/8 miles: 2:12.82 - Tricky Escape (2018)

Margins:

- 5 1/4 lengths – Honey Ryder (2005)

Most wins:

- 2 - Gentle Ruler (2019, 2020)
- 2 - Honey Ryder (2005, 2006)
- 2 - Alternate (2003, 2004)

Most wins by an owner:

- 2 - Pin Oak Stable (2003, 2004)
- 2 - Glencrest Farm (2005, 2006)
- 2 - Morsches Stable (2019, 2020)

Most wins by a jockey:

- 4 - Edgar S. Prado (1999, 2005, 2012, 2016)

Most wins by a trainer:

- 10 - H. Graham Motion (1999, 2002, 2003, 2004, 2007, 2009, 2016, 2017, 2023, 2025)

== Winners ==
Year	Winner	Age	Jockey	Trainer	Owner	Distance	Time	Purse	Grade	Ref
Robert G. Dick Memorial Stakes
2026	Dona Clota (CHI)	5	Irad Ortiz Jr.	Saffie A. Joseph Jr.	Resolute Racing	1 3/8 miles	2:16.77	$250,000	III	
2025	Markmans Queen (GB)	5	Jorge Ruiz	H. Graham Motion	Cayton Park Stud	abt. 1 3/8 miles	2:15.85	$250,000	III	
2024	War Like Goddess	7	Junior Alvarado	William I. Mott	George Krikorian	1 3/8 miles	2:16.60	$250,000	III	
2023	Sopran Basilea (IRE)	5	Jorge Ruiz	H. Graham Motion	Madaket Stables & Bill Strauss	1 3/8 miles	2:20.27	$250,300	III	
2022	Key Biscayne	5	Daniel Centeno	Juan Alvarado	Arindel	1 3/8 miles	2:24.41	$200,500	III	
2021	Dalika (GER)	5	Miguel Miguel	Albert Stall Jr.	Bal Mar Equine	1 3/8 miles	2:16.35	$200,375	III	
2020	Gentle Ruler	5	Chris Landeros	Ian R. Wilkes	Morsches Stable	1 1/4 miles	2:06.51	$125,000	Listed	Off turf
2019	Gentle Ruler	4	Chris Landeros	Ian R. Wilkes	Morsches Stable	1 3/8 miles	2:13.70	$200,375	III	
2018	Tricky Escape	4	Christopher P. DeCarlo	Lynn A. Ashby	Jon A. Marshall	1 3/8 miles	2:12.82	$208,100	III	
2017	Guilty Twelve	5	Christopher P. DeCarlo	H. Graham Motion	Merry Fox Stables	1 3/8 miles	2:17.23	$200,500	III	
2016	Real Smart	4	Edgar S. Prado	H. Graham Motion	Bjorn E. Nielsen	1 3/8 miles	2:16.10	$200,250	III	
2015	Ceisteach (IRE)	4	Channing Hill	Thomas F. Proctor	Glen Hill Farm & Hill 'n' Dale Equine Holdings	1 3/8 miles	2:16.97	$200,500	III	
2014	Aigue Marine (GB)	5	Kendrick Carmouche	Christophe Clement	Haras du Mezeray & Skymarc Farm	abt. 1 3/8 miles	2:14.71	$200,875	III	
2013	Treasured Up	4	Shaun Bridgmohan	Albert Stall Jr.	Spendthrift Farm	1 1/4 miles	2:05.92	$200,000	Listed	Off turf
2012	Starformer	4	Edgar S. Prado	William I. Mott	Juddmonte Farms	1 3/8 miles	2:15.19	$200,375	III	
2011	Cheetah (GB)	4	Jose Lezcano	Christophe Clement	Robert Scarborough	1 3/8 miles	2:13.13	$202,450	III	
Robert G. Dick Memorial Handicap
2010	Treat Gently (GB)	5	John R. Velazquez	William I. Mott	Juddmonte Farms	1 3/8 miles	2:19.02	$201,750	III	
2009	Caprice (GER)	6	Jeremy Rose	H. Graham Motion	NP Bloodstock, Inc.	1 3/8 miles	2:16.56	$171,050	III	
2008	Palmilla	5	Rosemary Homeister Jr.	Jonathan E. Sheppard	Augustin Stable	1 3/8 miles	2:17.28	$284,800	III	
2007	Rosinka (IRE)	4	Jeremy Rose	H. Graham Motion	The Lavington Stud	1 3/8 miles	2:16.56	$257,300	Listed	
2006	Honey Ryder	5	John R. Velazquez	Todd A. Pletcher	Glencrest Farm	1 3/8 miles	2:20.81	$295,100	Listed	
2005	Honey Ryder	4	Edgar S. Prado	Todd A. Pletcher	Glencrest Farm	1 3/8 miles	2:20.58	$296,000	Listed	
2004	Alternate	5	Ramon A. Dominguez	H. Graham Motion	Pin Oak Stable	1 3/8 miles	2:20.07	$151,000	Listed	
2003	Alternate	4	Oliver Castillo	H. Graham Motion	Pin Oak Stable	1 3/8 miles	2:15.04	$148,500	Listed	
Robert G. Dick Memorial Stakes
2002	New Economy	4	Ramon A. Dominguez	H. Graham Motion	Robert S. Evans	1 3/8 miles	2:17.78	$146,000	Listed	
2001	Amourette	5	Travis L. Dunkelberger	Gregg McCarron	Richard F. Otto	1 3/8 miles	2:17.20	$154,500	Listed	
2000	Camella	5	Aaron Gryder	Michael R. Matz	Dorothy Alexander Matz	1 3/8 miles	2:17.75	$151,500	Listed	
1999	Bursting Forth	5	Edgar S. Prado	H. Graham Motion	Sam Huff	1 3/8 miles	2:19.50	$151,200	Listed	
1998	Memories of Silver	5	Pat Day	James J. Toner	Joan G. & John W. Phillips	1 1/16 miles	1:43.66	$100,000	Listed	
Robert G. Dick Memorial Handicap
1997	Double Stake	4	Joseph Rocco	Hamilton A. Smith	Othneil H. Wienges	1 1/8 miles	1:52.60	$100,800	Listed	

Legend:
Turf Dirt

== See also ==
- List of American and Canadian Graded races
