= Just a Game (horse) =

Irish-bred Thoroughbred racehorse

Just A Game
- Sire: Tarboosh
- Grandsire: Bagdad
- Dam: Hobby
- Damsire: Falcon
- Sex: Mare
- Foaled: 1976
- Country: Ireland
- Colour: Dark Bay
- Breeder: Rathvale Stud
- Owner: Peter M. Brant & H. Joseph Allen
- Trainer: David A. Whiteley; LeRoy Jolley
- Record: 28: 14-4-3
- Earnings: US$416,069

Major wins
- Beresford Stakes (1978); Diana Handicap (1980); Flower Bowl Handicap (1980); Matchmaker Stakes (1980); Orchid Handicap (1980); New York Handicap (1980); Suwannee River Handicap (1980); La Prevoyante Handicap (1982)

Awards
- American Champion Female Turf Horse (1980)

Honours
- Just A Game Stakes at Belmont Park

Just a Game (foaled 1976 in Ireland) was a Champion Thoroughbred racehorse who competed in Ireland and in the United States where she was recorded as Just A Game II. In 1980, she won the Eclipse Award as the American Champion Female Turf Horse.

The Grade 1 Just A Game Stakes at Belmont Park is raced in her honor.
