= Christophe Clement Stakes =

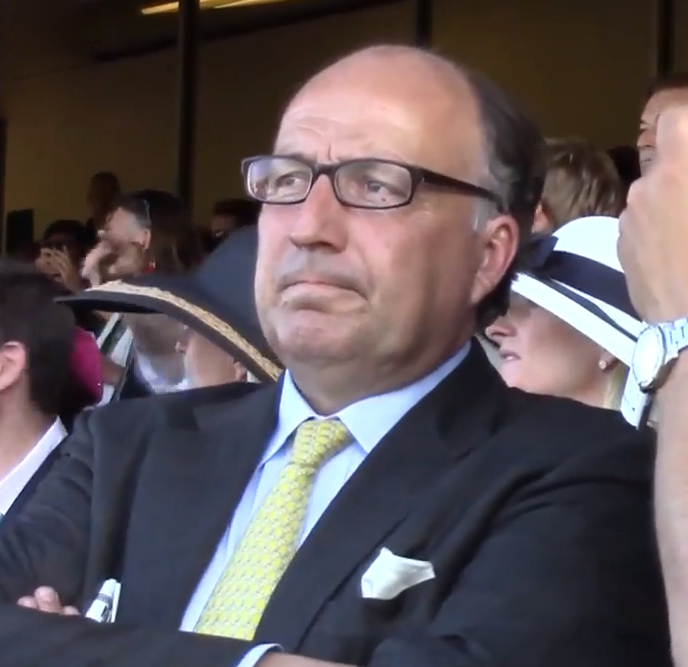
- Christophe Clement, for whom the race is named
- Class: Grade III
- Location: Gulfstream Park; Hallandale, Florida
- Inaugurated: 1976 (as La Prevoyante Handicap}
- Race type: Thoroughbred – Flat racing
- Website: www.gulfstreampark.com

Race information
- Distance: 1 1/2 miles (12 furlongs)
- Surface: Turf
- Track: Left-handed
- Qualification: Four-year-olds & up, fillies and mares
- Purse: $150,000 (since 2026)

The Christophe Clement Stakes is an American Thoroughbred horse race run annually at Gulfstream Park in Hallandale Beach, Florida. The race is open to fillies and mares, age four and up, willing to race one and one-half miles on turf. The Grade III race currently carries a purse of $200,000.

The race was first run at Calder Race Course in 1976 as the La Prevoyante Handicap, named for the Hall of Fame filly La Prevoyante, who collapsed and died in the unsaddling area at Calder Race Course after a December 28, 1974 race.

The race was moved to Gulfstream Park beginning in 2014. The purse doubled to $200,000 in 2017. In 2020 the race was no longer run under handicap conditions and was known as the La Prevoyante Stakes.

In July 2025 Gulfstream Park's owners, 1/ST Racing and Gaming, announced that the La Prevoyante would be renamed for the late trainer Christophe Clement. Clement was a six-time winner of the La Prevoyante, starting in 1992 when the win was his second career victory in a graded stakes race.

Due to track scheduling changes, the race was run twice in 2011; once in January and again in December.

First run in 1976, there was no race the following year but it returned permanently in 1978. It has been competed at various distances:

- 8.5 furlongs (1 1/16 miles) : 1976
- 9 furlongs (1 1/8 miles) : 1978–1983
- 12 furlongs (1 1/2 miles) : 1984 to present

== Records ==
Speed record: (at current distance of 1 1/2 miles)

- 2:24.25 – Alpha Bella (2024)

Most wins:

- 2 – Coretta (1998, 1999)

== Winners since 1998 ==
Year	Winner	Age	Jockey	Trainer	Owner	Time
2026	Speed Shopper	5	John R. Velazquez	William Walden	Gary Barber, Bridlewood Farm and Eclipse Thoroughbred Partners	2:26.76
2025	Forever After All	6	Tyler Gaffalione	Brendan Walsh	Dixiana Farms LLC	2:26.06
2024	Alpha Bella	4	Luis Saez	Todd Pletcher	Don Alberto Stables	2:24.25
2023	Personal Best	4	Irad Ortiz Jr.	Shug McGaughey	Joseph Allen LLC	2:26.04
2022	Beautiful Lover	6	Joel Rosario	Christophe Clement	Moyglare Stud Farm	2:30.49
2021	Always Shopping	5	Irad Ortiz Jr.	Todd Pletcher	Repole Stable	2:25.38
2020	Mean Mary	4	Luis Saez	Graham Motion	Alex G. Campbell Jr.	2:28.36
2019	Si Que Es Buena (ARG)	6	Chris Landeros	Graham Motion	Takaya Shimakawa	2:34.04
2018	Texting	5	Javier Castellano	Chad C. Brown	Sarah Sharp Farish	2:27.88
2017	Suffused	5	José Ortiz	William I. Mott	Juddmonte Farms	2:26.04
2016	no race					
2015	Goldy Espony (FR)	4	Javier Castellano	Chad C. Brown	Swift TBs / Bradley TBs	2:29.51
2014	Irish Mission	5	John R. Velazquez	Christophe Clement	Robert S. Evans	2:35.85
2013	no race					
2012	Closing Range	3	Elvis Trujillo	Philip J. Oliver	St. George Farm Racing	2:27.54
2011	Casablanca Smile	5	Javier Castellano	Shug McGaughey	Green Hills Farm	2:31.51
2011	Changing Skies	6	Kent J. Desormeaux	William I. Mott	Swettenham Stud	2:27.04
2010	no race					
2009	Criticism	5	Javier Castellano	Thomas Albertrani	Darley Racing	2:29.33
2008	Herboriste	5	Julien Leparoux	Michael Matz	Ehrnooth Amelie	2:25.47
2007	Redaspen	5	Eddie Castro	Rebecca Maker	Equivine Farm	2:26.63
2006	Safari Queen *	4	John Velazquez	Todd Pletcher	Arindel Farm	2:38.57
2005	Film Maker	5	Edgar Prado	H. Graham Motion	Courtlandt Farms	2:27.75
2004	Arvada	4	Edgar Prado	Robert J. Frankel	Giles W. Pritchard-Gordon	2:27.19
2003	Volga	5	Richard Migliore	Kiaran McLaughlin	H. Joseph Allen	2:26.13
2002	New Economy	4	Rosemary Homeister Jr.	H. Graham Motion	Robert S. Evans	2:28.55
2001	Krisada	5	Pat Day	C. R. McGaughey III	Stonerside Stable	2:26.63
2000	Prospectress	5	Jerry D. Bailey	Tom Skiffington Jr.	Susan Thomas	2:26.97
1999	Coretta	5	José A. Santos	Christophe Clement	Gerald W. Leigh	2:27.27
1998	Coretta	4	José A. Santos	Christophe Clement	Gerald W. Leigh	2:26.60

*Weather conditions resulted in the 2006 race being switched from the turf to what was a sloppy dirt track.

== Earlier winners ==
- 1997 – Last Approach
- 1996 – Ampulla
- 1995 – Interim
- 1994 – Abigailthewife, Trampoli
- 1993 – Lemhi Go
- 1992 – Sardaniya
- 1991 – Rigamajig
- 1990 – Yesterday's Kisses
- 1989 – Judy's Red Shoes
- 1988 – Singular Bequest
- 1987 – Lotka
- 1986 – Powder Break
- 1985 – Persian Tiara, Sabin
- 1984 – Bolt From The Blue, Sabin
- 1983 – London Lil, Fact Finder
- 1982 – Judgable Gypsy, Just A Game
- 1981 – Mairzy Doates, Deuces Over Seven
- 1980 – Impetuous Gal, Jolie Dutch
- 1979 – Unreality
- 1978 – Lens Determined
- 1976 – Forty Nine Sunsets, Redundancy
