= Glens Falls Stakes =

- Class: Grade II
- Location: Saratoga Race Course; Saratoga Springs, New York, United States
- Inaugurated: 1996
- Race type: Thoroughbred – Flat racing
- Website: NYRA

Race information
- Distance: 1 1/2 miles
- Surface: Turf
- Track: Left-handed
- Qualification: Fillies and Mares, four-year-olds and older
- Weight: 124 lbs with allowances
- Purse: US$250,000 (2021)

The Glens Falls Stakes is a Grade II American Thoroughbred horse race for fillies and mares aged four years old and older held over a distance of one and a half miles on the turf held annually in August at Saratoga Race Course in Saratoga Springs, New York. The event currently carries a purse of $250,000.

== History ==
The event at Saratoga Race Course is named after the nearby city of Glens Falls, New York.

The inaugural running of the event was on 9 August 1996 over a distance of 1 3/8 miles for fillies and mares three-years-old and older and was won by the 17-1 longshot Ampulla who was ridden by Shane Sellers in a time of 2:16.49 by a two lengths margin.

From 1998 to 2010 the event was run under handicap conditions.

In 1999 the event was upgraded in classification by the Thoroughbred Owners and Breeders Association's American Graded Stakes Committee to Grade III.

The Glens Falls Handicap was run in two divisions in 2004.

The event has been taken off the turf due the state of the turf track three times and run at a shorter distance: 2000, 2001, 2013.

In 2018 the event was upgrade to Grade II.

In 2020 the conditions of the event were modified for entrance to fillies and mares aged four years old and older.

In 2021 the distance of the event was increased from 1 3/8 miles to 1 1/2 miles.

== Records ==
Speed record:

- 1 1/2 miles: 2:27.05 – McKulick (2023)
- 1 3/8 miles: 2:11.46 – White Rose (2015)

Margins:

- 7 lengths – Auntie Mame (1998)

Most wins:

- 2 – War Like Goddess (2021, 2022)
- 2 – McKulick (GB) (2023, 2024)

Most wins by an owner:

- 2 – George Krikorian (2021, 2022)
- 2 – Klaravich Stables (2023, 2024)

Most wins by a jockey:

- 5 – John R. Velazquez (1998, 2004, 2005, 2014, 2015)

Most wins by a trainer:

- 7 – William I. Mott (1999, 2009, 2015, 2016, 2017, 2021, 2022)

== Winners ==
Year	Winner	Age	Jockey	Trainer	Owner	Distance	Time	Purse	Grade	Ref
Glens Falls Stakes
2026	Survie (IRE)	5	Flavien Prat	George Boughey	Michael Tabor	1 1/2 miles	2:31.21	$250,000	II	
2025	La Mehana (FR)	6	Flavien Prat	Miguel Clement	LSU Stables	1 1/2 miles	2:30.54	$250,000	II	
2024	McKulick (GB)	5	Irad Ortiz Jr.	Chad Brown	Klaravich Stables	1 1/2 miles	2:27.89	$250,000	II	
2023	McKulick (GB)	4	Irad Ortiz Jr.	Chad Brown	Klaravich Stables	1 1/2 miles	2:27.05	$250,000	II	
2022	War Like Goddess	5	Joel Rosario	William I. Mott	George Krikorian	1 1/2 miles	2:29.33	$250,000	II	
2021	War Like Goddess	4	Julien Leparoux	William I. Mott	George Krikorian	1 1/2 miles	2:27.55	$250,000	II	
2020	Civil Union	5	Joel Rosario	Claude R. McGaughey III	Allen Stable	1 3/8 miles	2:19.80	$200,000	II	
2019	Mrs. Sippy	4	Joel Rosario	H. Graham Motion	Andrew Stone	1 3/8 miles	2:13.62	$250,000	II	
2018	Lady Montdore	4	Manuel Franco	Thomas Albertrani	Godolphin	1 3/8 miles	2:20.78	$250,000	II	
2017	Harmonize	4	John R. Velazquez	William I. Mott	Larkin Armstrong	1 3/8 miles	2:15.59	$200,000	III	
2016	Suffused (GB)	4	Jose L. Ortiz	William I. Mott	Juddmonte	1 3/8 miles	2:13.55	$200,000	III	
2015	White Rose	5	Shaun Bridgmohan	William I. Mott	Jake Ballis & Rashard Lewis	1 3/8 miles	2:11.46	$200,000	III	
2014	Irish Mission (CAN)	5	John R. Velazquez	Christophe Clement	Robert S. Evans	1 3/8 miles	2:15.01	$150,000	III	
2013	Lady Cohiba	4	Junior Alvarado	Christophe Clement	Live Oak Plantation	1 1/8 miles	1:50.86	$150,000	Listed	Off turf
2012	Hit It Rich	5	Javier Castellano	Claude R. McGaughey III	Stuart S. Janney III	1 3/8 miles	2:12.34	$150,000	III	
2011	Emerald Beech	5	Alex O. Solis	Jonathan E. Sheppard	Augustin Stable	1 3/8 miles	2:21.71	$102,000	III	
Glens Falls Handicap
2010	Keertana	4	Jose Lezcano	Thomas F. Proctor	Barbara Hunter	1 3/8 miles	2:12.73	$100,000	III	
2009	Mushka	4	Kent J. Desormeaux	William I. Mott	Brushwood Stable	1 3/8 miles	2:13.50	$110,500	III	
2008	Hostess	5	Rajiv Maragh	H. James Bond	William L. Clifton Jr.	1 3/8 miles	2:11.66	$108,900	III	
2007	Rosinka (IRE)	4	Jeremy Rose	H. Graham Motion	Alistair McDonald Buchanan	1 3/8 miles	2:13.00	$111,200	III	
2006	Noble Stella (GER)	5	Mike E. Smith	Roger L. Attfield	Gary A. Tanaka	1 3/8 miles	2:16.02	$112,100	III	
2005	Honey Ryder	4	John R. Velazquez	Todd A. Pletcher	Glencrest Farm (Lessee)	1 3/8 miles	2:14.40	$109,200	III	
2004	Humaita (GER)	4	Cornelio Velasquez	H. Graham Motion	Andreas Jacobs	1 3/8 miles	2:14.25	$110,400	III	Division 1
2004	Arvada (GB)	4	John R. Velazquez	Robert J. Frankel	Giles Pritchard Gordon	1 3/8 miles	2:15.12	$109,300	III	Division 2
2003	Sixty Seconds (NZ)	5	Jose A. Santos	Christophe Clement	Leigh Family Stable	1 3/8 miles	2:13.96	$113,100	III	
2002	Owsley	4	Edgar S. Prado	Randy Schulhofer	Arthur B. Hancock III	1 3/8 miles	2:15.99	$113,500	III	
2001	Irving's Baby	4	Jerry D. Bailey	Todd A. Pletcher	Anstu Stable	1 1/4 miles	2:07.56	$106,700	Listed	Off turf
2000	I'm Indy Mood	5	Heberto Castillo Jr.	James J. Toner	Arthur G. Seelbinder, Ronald & Patricia Nicholson	1 1/4 miles	2:07.41	$110,200	III	Off turf
1999	Idle Rich	4	Jerry D. Bailey	William I. Mott	Stonerside Stable	1 3/8 miles	2:12.81	$109,600	III	
1998	Auntie Mame	4	John R. Velazquez	Angel A. Penna Jr.	Lazy F Ranch	1 3/8 miles	2:13.15	$110,000	Listed	
Glens Falls Stakes
1997	Shemozzle (IRE)	4	Jerry D. Bailey	Christophe Clement	Lord Hartington	1 3/8 miles	2:12.89	$107,900	Listed	
1996	Ampulla	5	Shane Sellers	Patrick B. Byrne	North Cliff Farms	1 3/8 miles	2:16.49	$112,500	Listed	

Legend:
Dirt Turf

== See also ==
- List of American and Canadian Graded races
