= Juan Gonzalez (jockey) =

Personal information
- Born: February 22, 1948 Jerez, Zacatecas, Mexico
- Died: July 5, 1975 (aged 27) Pleasanton, California, United States
- Occupation: Jockey

Horse racing career
- Sport: Horse racing

Major racing wins
- Hillsborough Handicap (1969); Yerba Buena Handicap (1973)

Racing awards
- Bay Meadows Champion Jockey (1973)

Honours
- Juan Gonzalez Memorial Stakes at Pleasanton Fairgrounds Racetrack

Juan T. Gonzalez (February 22, 1948 - July 5, 1975) was a Mexican-born jockey in American Thoroughbred horse racing who died in a racing accident at the Pleasanton Fairgrounds Racetrack at the Alameda County Fairgrounds in Pleasanton, California. Gonzalez dominated thoroughbred racing in Northern California and rode more winners at Northern California tracks than any other jockey during his career.

== Career highlights ==
In 1969, Gonzalez became the first jockey to ride more than 100 winners during a single race meet in Northern California. On December 17, of that same year he rode five winners at Bay Meadows Racetrack and in 1973 set a Bay Meadows Racetrack record that stood for thirteen years when he won 118 races at a single meet.

== Death and memorial ==
A native of Ermita de Guadalupe, a community near Jerez, Zacatecas, Mexico, Gonzalez died instantly from a broken neck when his horse fell on another horse that had stumbled and fallen in front of him. He died on the track where his career began in front of his wife Maria and their two young daughters.

A funeral service was held for Gonzalez on July 7 in San Mateo, California after which his remains were returned to his native Jerez for burial.

In his memory, the Pleasanton Racetrack annually runs the Juan Gonzalez Memorial Stakes.
