= Bold 'n Determined =

American-bred Thoroughbred racehorse

- Sire: Bold And Brave
- Grandsire: Bold Ruler
- Dam: Pidi
- Damsire: Determine
- Sex: Filly
- Foaled: 1977
- Country: United States
- Colour: Bay
- Breeder: Dr. Gordon E. Layton
- Owner: Saron Stable
- Trainer: Neil D. Drysdale
- Record: 20: 16–2-0
- Earnings: $949,599

Major wins
- Oak Leaf Stakes (1979); Fantasy Stakes (1980); Spinster Stakes (1980); Coaching Club American Oaks (1980); Santa Susana Stakes (1980); Kentucky Oaks (1980); Acorn Stakes (1980); Maskette Stakes (1980); Pasadena Stakes (1980); Apple Blossom Handicap (1981); Bewitch Stakes (1981)

Honours
- U.S. Racing Hall of Fame (1997)
- Last updated on February 7, 2008

Bold 'n Determined (1977–1997), was an American Thoroughbred race horse.

== Background ==
Bold 'n Determined was a bay mare bred in Kentucky by Dr. Gordon E. Layton. Her dam was the unraced mare Pidi, by Determine. Determine won the 1954 Kentucky Derby. Her sire was Bold And Brave by the great Bold Ruler. She is inbred 4x4 to the great English stallion Pharos.

She was owned by Corbin Robertson's Saron Stable and trained by Neil Drysdale.

== Racing career ==
Bold 'n Determined won her first four races at two, including the Oak Leaf Stakes. Out of her twenty starts, she won 16 and placed in two, with six of her wins coming in Grade I stakes events. Ridden most by Hall of Fame jockey Eddie Delahoussaye, Bold 'n Determined competed on both coasts, winning virtually all of her races. In 1980, at the age of three, she took the Acorn Stakes and the Coaching Club American Oaks, which are two of the three races comprising the New York Filly Triple Crown. She also won the equivalent of the Kentucky Derby for females: the Kentucky Oaks.

That year, a filly won the Kentucky Derby, Genuine Risk, the first member of her gender to do so since Regret had won it in 1915. Genuine Risk also placed in the Preakness Stakes and the Belmont Stakes. But in the Maskette Stakes (now called the Go For Wand Handicap), Bold 'n Determined beat Genuine Risk by a nose. In that race, she also beat the Hall of Fame filly Davona Dale, American Champion Three-Year-Old Filly of 1979.

At four, Bold 'n Determined took the Bewitch Stakes and the Apple Blossom Handicap, spotting her rivals 4 to 13 pounds, but began to experience problems with her ankles. The decision was made to retire her from racing.

In 1980, she was runner-up to Genuine Risk in the Eclipse Awards for American Champion Three-Year-Old Filly. In 1997, the year of her death, she was inducted into the National Museum of Racing and Hall of Fame.

== Breeding record ==
Bold 'n Determined spent her broodmare career at Waterford Farm and Gainsborough Farm in Kentucky. On July 1, 1997, she was euthanized due to the complications of "founder" or laminitis.
