= Juan González-Castelao =

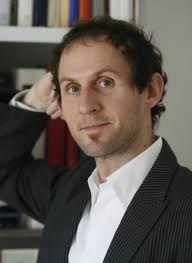

Juan González-Castelao is a Spanish musicologist, translator, arts manager and conductor.

== Musician [1999–2006] ==
Spanish musicologist, arts manager and musician, also known as Juan Castelao (artistic name), active as a conductor between 1999 and 2006. He made his conducting debut as principal conductor of the Oviedo Youth Symphony Orchestra (JOSVE) for its inaugural season (1999-2000). Since then he has served as music director of the Georgetown Bach Chorale and Orchestra (Toronto) between 2000 and 2003, and music director of the Vancouver Philharmonic Orchestra (Vancouver) between 2003 and 2006. His activity has included guest appearances with the Navarra Symphony Orchestra (Pamplona), the Asturias Symphony Orchestra (Oviedo), the León Symphony Orchestra (León), and the Asturias Philharmonic Orchestra (Gijón).

== Musicologist and arts manager ==
Parallel to his task as a conductor, González-Castelao has pursued his career as a musicologist, devoting his academic and linguistic vocation both to research and to the translation into Spanish of key music history and theory books for Akal Ediciones. His most recent works include the Spanish versions of Fred Lerdahl and Ray Jackendoff's A Generative Theory of Tonal Music, Alan W. Atlas's Renaissance Music and Joost Langeveld's Horen en zien. His PhD Thesis in Musicology, completed in December 2007, analyses in detail the life and career of Spanish conductor Ataúlfo Argenta (1913-1958). This thesis was awarded Summa cum laude, as well as the VIII Orfeón Donostiarra-Universidad del País Vasco Award for Music Research in 2007-2008. The book version of this research is available in Spanish under the title Ataúlfo Argenta: Claves de un mito de la dirección de orquesta, published by the Instituto Complutense de Ciencias Musicales (ICCMU) in collaboration with Caja Cantabria and the Castro Urdiales Town Council.

González-Castelao has been awarded the Edison Fellowship by the British Library Sound Archive, where he has focused his research on computer-based performance analysis, being one of the first scholars in Spain interested in this field. The results of this research have been presented in the National Conference of the Spanish Musicological Society (Cáceres, 2008). He has presented his research in different conferences in Dublin, Barcelona, Madrid, Cáceres, Valladolid and Oviedo, and his articles have appeared in Debats, Cuadernos de Música Iberoamericana, Melómano. He has also given master classes and lectures at the Universidad Internacional Menéndez Pelayo (UIMP), the Conservatorio Superior de Música de Oviedo, the Fundación Asturiana de Estudios Hispánicos (Cursos de la Granda) and the Universidad del País Vasco (Cursos de Verano, Quincena Musical Donostiarra).

His interest in music education and management has led him to serve as coordinator (head of studies) of the Academy of Orchestral Studies of the Barenboim-Said Foundation in Seville (Spain), during the school year 2010-2011, as well as to teach foreign languages, phonetics and speech between 2010 and 1013. In 2014 he has been a member of the Production team of Arts at Dartington and the Dartington International Summer School (Dartington Hall Trust, Totnes, Devon, UK). In the fall of 2019 he was a member of the European Union Youth Orchestra office team as projects and orchestra assistant. Since 2015, he has continued his interest in the translation of books (related to the humanities) for Elefthería Ediciones (Barcelona), and in 2016 he has retaken his collaboration with Akal Ediciones with the translation of Laura Tunbridge's The Song Cycle (Cambridge University Press), and Norton & Norton's six-volume "Western Music in Context" series, starting with Walter Frisch's Music in the Nineteenth Century, Wendy Heller's Music in the Baroque, Joseph Auner's Music in the 20th and 21st Centuries, and Richard Freedman's Music in the Renaissance.

== Education ==
González-Castelao studied both Orchestral and Choral Conducting at Indiana University School of Music and the Sweelinck Conservatorium (Amsterdam), under Daniel Reuss, David Porcelijn, Péter Eötvös and Roland Kieft, Thomas Baldner, Betsy Burleigh and Thomas Dunn. He was awarded scholarships by the Institución Príncipe de Viana (Navarra) and the Principado de Asturias (Oviedo) in order to carry out these studies abroad, after finishing his Honours bachelor's degree in Violin Performance at the Conservatorio Superior de Música de Oviedo (Spain) and his Bachelor's plus master's degree in Geography, History, Art and Musicology at the University of Oviedo. He continued his education attending numerous workshops and courses such as the Tanglewood Music Center (2000) and the Kurt Thomas Cursus (Utrecht), which brought him in contact with teachers such as Paul Van Nevel, Robert Spano, Seiji Ozawa, Julian Reynolds, Ford Lallerstedt and Jos van Veldhoven.
