= Pleasanton Fairgrounds Racetrack =

Horse racing venue in Pleasanton, California

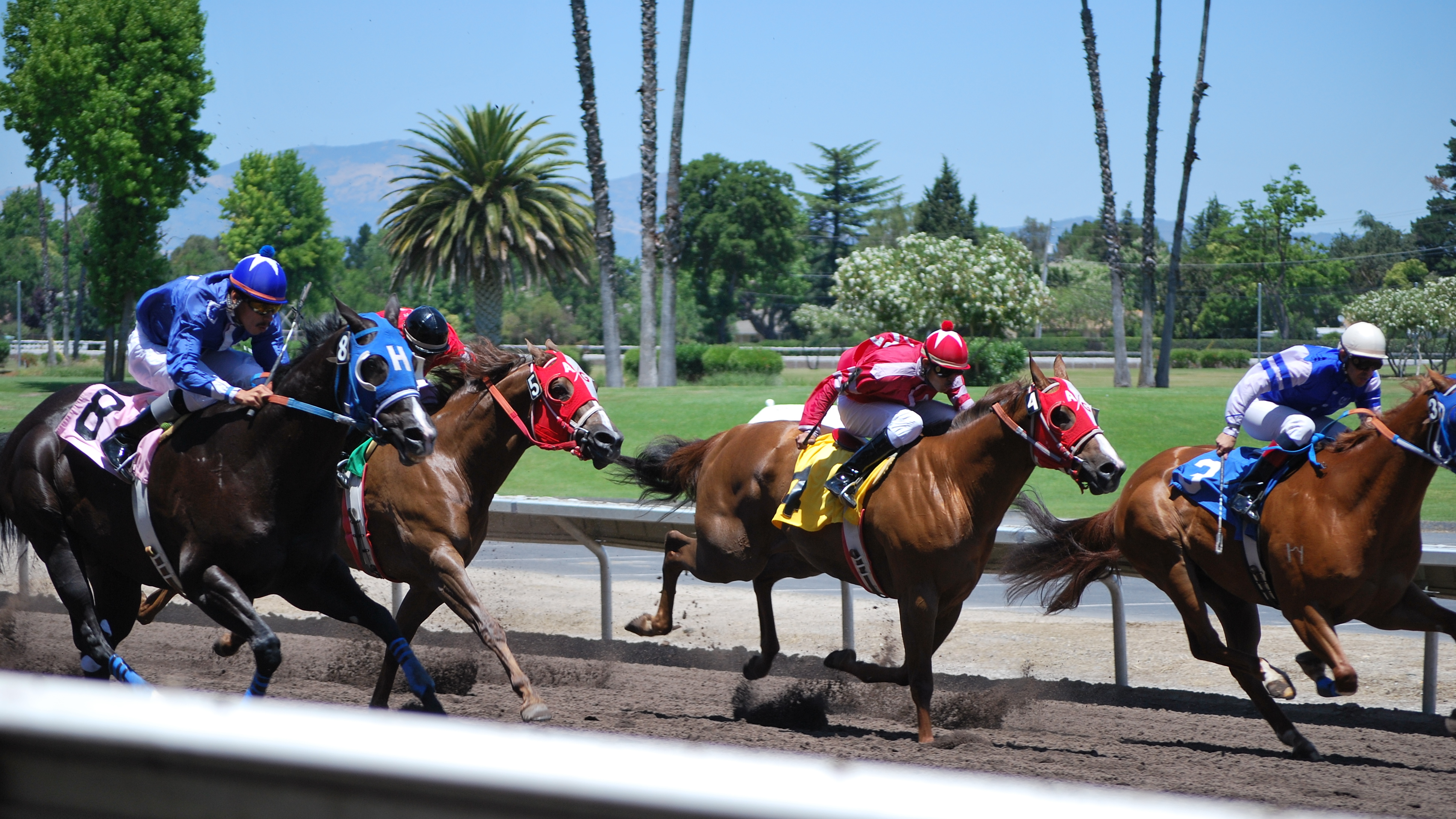
- Quarter Horse racing at Fairgrounds
- Interactive map of Pleasanton Fairgrounds Racetrack
- Location: Pleasanton, California
- Coordinates: 37°39′47″N 121°53′01″W
- Owned by: Alameda County
- Date opened: 1858
- Course type: Flat/Thoroughbred

The Pleasanton Fairgrounds Racetrack at the Alameda County Fairgrounds in Pleasanton, California is a one-mile (1.6 km / 8-f) race track for Thoroughbred, Quarter horse and Arabian racing. Constructed in 1858 by the sons of Spaniard Don Agustín Bernal, it is the third-oldest horse racing track of its kind in the United States. Only the Freehold Raceway in New Jersey (oldest, which closed in 2024) and Fair Grounds Race Course in Louisiana are older.

Known as the Pleasanton Trotting Park in 1876, Joseph Nevis inherited the track and took over the racetrack and built its first grandstand. In 1883, Australian millionaire Monroe Salisbury bought it for $25,000 (about 666,325 when adjusted for inflation), and renamed it the Pleasanton Stock Farm. His signature red hay gained fame for the racetrack, and Eastern United States owners began shipping their horses to Pleasanton.

In 1900, H.F Anderson bought the racetrack, renaming it the Pleasanton Training Track, and improved it with the extension of the racetrack, and the addition of 200 stalls.

The racetrack eventually became associated with the Alameda County Fair with the first fair being held on the grounds of the racetrack in 1912.

The racetrack would again change hands in 1911, when the Canadian Roger J. MacKenzie bought it and renovated it by adding living quarters and an additional barn to accommodate extra horses. Due to the racetrack's reliance on betting to stay afloat and the brief outlawing of it for 20 years, the racetrack would be closed for 16 years from 1916 to 1932.

In 1940, the facility was sold to Alameda County.

In years past, during the winter months wealthy owners in the Eastern United States often shipped their horses to Pleasanton for training.

Notable races run annually at Pleasanton include:

- California Wine Stakes
- Livermore Valley Wine Stakes
- Alameda County Fillies & Mares
- Alamedan Handicap
- Sam J. Whiting Memorial Handicap
- Juan Gonzalez Memorial Stakes
- Everett Nevin Alameda County Overnight Stakes
