= Orchid Stakes =

- Class: Grade III
- Location: Gulfstream Park; Hallandale Beach, Florida
- Inaugurated: 1954
- Race type: Thoroughbred – Flat racing
- Website: Gulfstream Park

Race information
- Distance: 1 1/2 miles
- Surface: Turf
- Track: Left-handed
- Qualification: fillies and mares, four years old and older
- Weight: 123 lbs with allowances
- Purse: $150,000 (since 2022)

The Orchid Stakes is a Grade III American Thoroughbred horse race for fillies and mares that are four years or older held over a distance of one and one-half miles on the turf usually scheduled annually in late March as an under card event on Florida Derby day at Gulfstream Park, Hallandale Beach, Florida. The event currently carries a purse of $150,000.

== History ==
The inaugural running of the event was on 11 March 1954 as a six furlong dirt sprint for three year old fillies that was easily won by Queen Hopeful who was ridden by US Hall of Fame jockey John H. Adams and trained by US Hall of Fame trainer Harry E. Trotsek by a 3 lengths margin.

Gulfstream Park did not schedule the event again until 1965 after an absence of 10 years. In 1965 and 1966 the event was still held for three year old fillies but the distance was increased to 1 1/16 miles. In 1967 the event was held on the turf for the first time over a distance of one mile. The conditions of the event were changes to allow older mares compete under handicap conditions. In the first division Indian Sunlite set a track record for the mile in a time of 1:34 3/5.

In 1969 the distance of the event was increased to 1 1/16 miles.

In 1973 the first year the classification system was enacted, the event was set with Grade III status and in 1981 the event was upgraded to Grade II.

In 1986 the distance of the event was increased to 1 1/2 miles.

In 2006 the event was downgraded to a Grade III event. In 2008 the event's conditions were changed from handicap to stakes allowance with name of race changed back to the original name.

In 2016 the distance of the event of was decreased to 1 3/8 miles and in 2022 was increased back to 1 1/2 miles.

The event has been run in split division four times: 1967, 1972, 1983, 1985

== Records ==
Speed record:

- 1 3/8 miles – 2:11.73 Mean Mary (2020)
- 1 1/2 miles – 2:23.07 Honey Ryder (2005)
- 1 1/16 miles – 1:40.40 Just A Game (IRE) (1980)
- 1 mile – 1:34.60 Indian Sunlite (1967)

Margins:

- 5 1/2 lengths – Tweedside (2003)

Most wins:

- 2 – Honey Ryder (2005, 2006)

Most wins by a jockey:

- 5 – John R. Velazquez (2005, 2006, 2008, 2011, 2015)

Most wins by a trainer:

- 8 – Christophe Clement (1994, 1999, 2000, 2001, 2002, 2004, 2015, 2023)

Most wins by an owner:

- 3 – Barbara Hunter (1970, 1974, 1979)
- 3 – Glencrest Farm (1987, 2005, 2006)

== Winners ==
Year	Winner	Age	Jockey	Trainer	Owner	Distance	Time	Purse	Grade	Ref
Orchid Stakes
2026	Sultana	5	Junior Alvarado	Kevin Attard	Lou Donato, Theodore Manziaris, Paul Borrelli & Lanni Bloodstock	1 1/2 miles	2:24.47	$150,000	III	
2025	Beach Bomb (SAF)	5	Luis Saez	H. Graham Motion	Cayton Park Stud	1 1/2 miles	2:24.29	$150,000	III	
2024	McKulick (GB)	5	Irad Ortiz Jr.	Chad C. Brown	Klaravich Stables	1 1/2 miles	2:25.20	$150,000	III	
2023	Amazing Grace (GER)	5	Joel Rosario	Christophe Clement	Moyglare Stud Farm	1 1/2 miles	2:28.82	$150,000	III	
2022	Family Way	5	Tyler Gaffalione	Brendan Walsh	Hunter Valley Farm, Debra L. O'Connor & Marc Detampel	abt. 1 1/2 miles	2:29.08	$150,000	III	
2021	War Like Goddess	4	Julien R. Leparoux	William I. Mott	George Krikorian	1 3/8 miles	2:12.34	$100,000	III	
2020	Mean Mary	4	Luis Saez	H. Graham Motion	Alex G. Campbell Jr.	1 3/8 miles	2:11.73	$100,000	III	
2019	Santa Monica (GB)	6	Irad Ortiz Jr.	Chad C. Brown	R Unicorn Stable	1 3/8 miles	2:16.07	$100,000	III	
2018	Race not held									
2017	Summersault	5	Paco Lopez	Mark A. Hennig	William Parsons Jr & David S. Howe	1 3/8 miles	2:12.24	$200,000	III	
2016	Photo Call (IRE)	5	Javier Castellano	Todd A. Pletcher	Teresa Viola Racing Stables	1 3/8 miles	2:16.38	$200,000	III	
2015	Beauty Parlor	4	John R. Velazquez	Christophe Clement	Joseph Allen	1 1/2 miles	2:26.89	$150,000	III	
2014	Anjaz	5	Rajiv Maragh	Thomas Albertrani	Godolphin Racing	1 1/2 miles	2:24.70	$150,000	III	
2013	Regalo Mia	4	Luis Contreras	Michelle Nihei	Steven W. Ciccarone	1 1/2 miles	2:23.48	$150,000	III	
2012	Hit It Rich	5	Javier Castellano	Claude R. McGaughey III	Stuart S. Janney III	1 1/2 miles	2:28.06	$150,000	III	
2011	La Luna de Miel (GER)	4	John R. Velazquez	H. Graham Motion	Rashit Shaykhutdinov	1 1/2 miles	2:25.76	$150,000	III	
2010	Speak Easy Gal	4	Elvis Trujillo	Martin D. Wolfson	Farnsworth Stables	1 1/2 miles	2:28.46	$150,000	III	
2009	Dress Rehearsal (IRE)	4	Kent J. Desormeaux	William I. Mott	Swettenham Stud	1 1/2 miles	2:29.77	$150,000	III	
Orchid Handicap
2008	Hostess	5	John R. Velazquez	H. James Bond	William L. Clifton Jr.	1 1/2 miles	2:25.83	$150,000	III	
2007	Safari Queen (ARG)	5	Christopher P. DeCarlo	Todd A. Pletcher	Arindel Farm	1 1/2 miles	2:25.17	$150,000	III	
2006	Honey Ryder	5	John R. Velazquez	Todd A. Pletcher	Glencrest Farm	1 1/2 miles	2:23.07	$150,000	III	
2005	Honey Ryder	4	John R. Velazquez	Todd A. Pletcher	Glencrest Farm	1 1/2 miles	2:27.15	$150,000	II	
2004	Meridiana (GER)	4	Edgar S. Prado	Christophe Clement	Jon & Sarah Kelly	1 1/2 miles	2:26.99	$200,000	II	
2003	Tweedside	5	Rene R. Douglas	Todd A. Pletcher	Eugene & Laura Melnyk	1 1/2 miles	2:32.36	$200,000	II	Off turf
2002	Julie Jalouse	4	Jose A. Santos	Christophe Clement	Skymarc Farm	1 1/2 miles	2:25.89	$200,000	II	
2001	Innuendo (IRE)	6	Jerry D. Bailey	Christophe Clement	Gerald W. Leigh	1 1/2 miles	2:25.24	$194,000	II	
2000	Lisieux Rose (IRE)	6	Jose A. Santos	Christophe Clement	Moyglare Stud Farm	1 1/2 miles	2:25.64	$200,000	II	
1999	Coretta (IRE)	5	Jose A. Santos	Christophe Clement	Gerald W. Leigh	1 1/2 miles	2:23.85	$200,000	II	
1998	Colonial Play	5	Robbie Davis	Flint S. Schulhofer	Robert S. Evans	1 1/2 miles	2:24.75	$200,000	II	
1997	Golden Pond (IRE)	4	Herb McCauley	Martin D. Wolfson	Silverleaf Farms	1 1/2 miles	2:26.84	$200,000	II	
1996	Memories (IRE)	5	Jose A. Santos	Burk Kessinger Jr.	New Phoenix Stable	1 1/2 miles	2:31.51	$200,000	II	
1995	Exchange (CAN)	7	Laffit Pincay Jr.	William Spawr	Sidney H. Craig	1 1/2 miles	2:29.02	$200,000	II	
1994	Trampoli	5	Mike E. Smith	Christophe Clement	Paul de Moussac	1 1/2 miles	2:25.42	$200,000	II	
1993	Fairy Garden	5	Wigberto S. Ramos	Roger L. Attfield	Virginia Kraft Payson	1 1/2 miles	2:25.79	$200,000	II	
1992	Crockadore	5	Mike E. Smith	William I. Mott	Timothy Mahony	abt. 1 1/2 miles	2:28.32	$200,000	II	
1991	Star Standing (CAN)	4	Chris Antley	William J. Hirsch Jr.	Keswick Stables	1 1/2 miles	2:25.02	$200,000	II	
1990	Coolawin	4	Jerry D. Bailey	Carl A. Nafzger	James B. Tafel	1 1/2 miles	2:24.20	$200,000	II	
1989	Gaily Gaily (IRE)	6	Julie Krone	William I. Mott	Bertram R. Firestone	1 1/2 miles	2:26.80	$200,000	II	
1988	Beauty Cream	5	Pat Day	Patrick C. Clark	Warren N. Moore	1 1/2 miles	2:28.40	$200,000	II	
1987	Anka Germania (IRE)	5	Craig Perret	Thomas J. Skiffington	Glencrest Farm & Fernwood Stables	1 1/2 miles	2:31.40	$150,000	II	
1986	Videogenic	4	Robbie Davis	Gasper S. Moschera	Albert & Barbara Davis	1 1/2 miles	2:27.20	$197,400	II	
1985	Pretty Perfect	5	Gerland Gallitano	Harvey L. Vanier	Louis F. Aitken	1 1/16 miles	1:41.60	$103,300	II	Division 1
1985	Aspen Rose	5	Jorge Velasquez	John M. Veitch	Daniel M. Galbreath	1 1/16 miles	1:42.00	$108,675	II	Division 2
1984	Sabin	4	Eddie Maple	Woodford C. Stephens	Henryk de Kwiatkowski	1 1/16 miles	1:41.40	$117,800	II	Off turf
1983	Sweetest Chant	5	Earlie Fires	Joseph M. Bollero	Russell L. Reineman Stable	1 1/16 miles	1:45.60	$88,400	II	Division 1
1983	Larida	4	Eddie Maple	Woodford C. Stephens	Newstead Farm	1 1/16 miles	1:44.80	$89,400	II	Division 2
1982	Blush	4	Jacinto Vasquez	David A. Whiteley	Lazy F Ranch	1 1/16 miles	1:41.00	$127,500	II	
1981	Honey Fox	4	Jacinto Vasquez	Flint S. Schulhofer	Dr. Jerome M. Torsney	1 1/16 miles	1:41.20	$136,200	II	
1980	Just A Game (IRE)	4	Don Brumfield	David A. Whiteley	Peter M. Brant & H. Joseph Allen	1 1/16 miles	1:40.40	$123,600	III	
1979	Sans Arc	5	Earlie Fires	Stanley M. Rieser	Barbara Hunter	1 1/16 miles	1:41.40	$132,450	III	
1978	Time for Pleasure	4	Thomas Barrow	Phil A. Grosser	William Q. Muir	1 1/16 miles	1:41.00	$63,000	III	
1977	Copano	5	Mickey Solomone	Oral C. Pickard	John D. King	1 1/16 miles	1:41.40	$72,500	III	
1976	Deesse Du Val	5	Carlos H. Marquez Sr.	Stephen A. DiMauro	Mrs. Joan C. Johnson & Mrs. Suzanne Carl	1 1/16 miles	1:41.80	$47,975	III	
1975	Protectora (CHI)	6	Heliodoro Gustines	Warren J. Pascuma	Edward Seltzer	1 1/16 miles	1:41.20	$43,500	III	
1974	Dogtooth Violet	4	Don Brumfield	Stanley M. Rieser	Barbara Hunter	1 1/16 miles	1:41.00	$65,700	III	
1973	Deb Marion	3	Frank Ianelli	John H. Rigione	George H. Schmidt	1 1/16 miles	1:42.60	$45,400	III	
1972	Evening Bag	7	William Gavidia	Charles C. Sanborn	George A. Sacks	1 1/16 miles	1:41.60	$49,600		Division 1
1972	Toter Back	5	Jorge Tejeira	Raymond G. Alaimo	Steve L. Alaimo	1 1/16 miles	1:41.60	$49,600		Division 2
1971	Swoon's Flower	4	Carlos H. Marquez Sr.	George Towne	Waldemar Farm	1 1/16 miles	1:43.60	$46,525		
1970	Pattee Canyon	5	Earlie Fires	Stanley M. Rieser	Barbara Hunter	1 1/16 miles	1:43.00	$50,950		
1969	Spire	5	Ray Broussard	Michael F. Fogarty	George R. Wallace	1 1/16 miles	1:43.00	$33,950		
1968	Chriscinca	4	Earlie Fires	Budd Lepman	Alfred A. Muller	1 mile	1:35.80	$23,725		
1967	Indian Sunlite	4	Howard Grant	Sherrill W. Ward	George M. Humphrey	1 mile	1:34.60	$22,187		Division 1
1967	Straight Deal	5	Jorge Velasquez	Hirsch Jacobs	Mrs. Ethel D. Jacobs	1 mile	1:35.20	$22,387		Division 2
Orchid Stakes
1966	Chalina	3	Ken Knapp	Leroy Jolley	Mrs. Moody Jolley	1 1/16 miles	1:43.40	$16,700		3YO fillies
1965	Vassar Grad	3	Ken Knapp	Charles C. Sanborn	Bwamazon Farm	1 1/16 miles	1:46.20	$17,050		3YO fillies
1955–1964		Race not held								
1954	Queen Hopeful	3	John H. Adams	Harry E. Trotsek	Hasty House Farm (Allie E. Reuben)	6 furlongs	1:12.00	$11,150		3YO fillies

Legend:
Turf Dirt

== See also ==
List of American and Canadian Graded races
