= Juan Manuel González =

Juan Manuel González may refer to:

- Juan Manuel González Corominas (born 1968), Spanish racing driver
- Juan Manuel González Torres, Colombian politician
- Juan Manuel González (racing driver) (born 1999), Mexican racing driver
- Juan Fierro (born 1974), Chilean cyclist
