= Corbin Robertson =

American businessman (born 1947)

Corbin "Corby" J. Robertson Jr.
- Born: October 28, 1947 (age 78); Houston, Texas
- Education: University of Texas
- Occupation: Businessman
- Employer(s): Quintana Petroleum; Natural Resource Partners

Corbin J. Robertson Jr. is an American businessman.

== Personal life and education ==
Robertson is the grandson of Texas oil magnate Hugh Roy Cullen, the founder of Quintana Petroleum. Robertson's father also worked for Quintana. Robertson was an All-American linebacker at the University of Texas, captaining the team to a victory at the 1969 Cotton Bowl Classic.

== Career ==
Robertson's involvement with the family business began when he was 15 years old. Robertson inherited Quintana's large holdings in oil but, in the 1980s, decided to invest his fortune in coal. Robertson built up a large coal empire, usually by buying the land and collecting royalties from the coal mined from the land. Some of Robertson's operations involved mountaintop removal. By some estimates, as of 2010 Quintana had the second largest amount of coal reserves in the United States, with only the federal government having bigger reserves.

Robertson is currently the Chairman and CEO of Natural Resource Partners. Robertson sits on numerous other boards.

== Thoroughbred racing ==
Corbin Robertson bred and raced Thoroughbred horses. He competed under the nom de course Saron Stable. His greatest success came with the filly Bold 'n Determined who was inducted into the United States Racing Hall of Fame in 1997. Among the best of Robertson's other runners was the homebred Turkoman, a son of Hall of Fame inductee Alydar. In 1986 Turkoman was voted the Eclipse Award as that year's U.S. Champion Older Male Horse.

== Political activity ==
Robertson had close ties with administration of George W. Bush. Robertson is a major Republican donor, and has been involved with the Koch Brothers. He has also given money to Texas Republicans Rick Perry, Greg Abbott, and Joe Barton. Quintana is closely affiliated with the Coalition for Responsible Regulation, which seeks to challenge EPA greenhouse gas regulations. Robertson has also given to Save Whatcom, a conservative group in Whatcom County, Washington.
