= Ruthless Stakes =

- Class: Open
- Location: Aqueduct Racetrack; Queens, New York, United States
- Race type: Thoroughbred

Race information
- Distance: 6 furlongs
- Surface: Dirt
- Track: Left-handed
- Qualification: 3-year-old
- Weight: Filly: 121 lb (55 kg)
- Purse: US$100,000 Added

The Ruthless Stakes is an American open or non-Graded stakes race held yearly since 1974 at Aqueduct Racetrack in Queens, New York City. Run in January, it is a six furlong thoroughbred horse race for three-year-old fillies carrying a weight of 121 pounds (54.9 kg). The Ruthless currently offers a purse of $100,000.

The Ruthless began as a 9 furlong race, with the exception of 1978 and 1979. From 1993 to present it remains at 6 furlongs.

In its 41st running in 2018, the race is named for the Hall of Fame filly, Ruthless, winner of the inaugural Belmont Stakes in 1867.

== Winners of the Ruthless Stakes ==
- 2018 – Strategic Dreams (Manuel Franco) (1:27.02)
- 2017 – Yorkiepoo Princess (Irad Ortiz Jr.) (1:12.42)
- 2016 – Constellation (Irad Ortiz Jr.) (1:10.89)
- 2015 – Paulassilverlining (Irad Ortiz Jr.) (1:12.84)
- 2014 – Mamdooha (1:12.01)
- 2013 – Lady Banks (1:12.14)
- 2012 – Agave Kiss (Ryan Curatolo) (1:10.28)
- 2011 – Breathoffreshheir (Carlos Marquez Jr.)
- 2010 – Indian Burn (Richard Migliore) (1:14.05)
- 2009 – Justwhistledixie (Rajiv Maragh) (1:10.81)
- 2008 – Dill Or No Dill (Ramon Domínguez) (1:10.91)
- 2007 – Golden Dreamer (Norberto Arroyo Jr.) (1:10.26)
- 2006 – Silvestris (Eibar Coa) (1:11.20)
- 2005 – Megascape (Stewart Elliott) (1:11.45)
- 2004 – Baldomera (Anthony Black) (1:13.93)
- 2003 – Lizzy Cool (Chuck C. Lopez) (1:10.92)
- 2002 – Nice Boots Baby (Mario Pino) (1:10.82)
- 2001 – Xtra Heat (Rick Wilson) (1:11.32) (Multiple Graded Stakes winner, Eclipse Champion Three Year Old Filly, 2001.)
- 2000 – Lorie Darlin (Joe Bravo) (1:11.35)
- 1999 – Seeking the Sky (Aaron Gryder) (1:10.20)
- 1998 – Cheers and Tears (Oliver Castillo) (1:12.00)
- 1997 – Valid Affect (Mike Luzzi) (1:11.00)
- 1996 – Winter Melody (Mike McCarthy) (1:11.68)
- 1995 – Evil's Pic (Mike Luzzi) (1:13.68)
- 1994 – Dixie Luck (Filiberto Leon) (1:11.86)
- 1993 – Roamin Rachel (Chris Antley) (1:10.91) (Multiple stakes winner)
- 1992 – No Race
- 1991 – No Race
- 1990 – No Race
- 1989 – No Race
- 1988 – Aptostar (Robbie Davis) (1:50.40) (Grade I winner)
- 1987 – Super Cook (Ángel Cordero Jr.) (1:51.60)
- 1986 – Stated (Eddie Maple) (1:52.60) (Dynamic Star placed but was disqualified to 3rd for interference)
- 1985 – Koluctco's Jill (Robbie Davis) (1:53.60)
- 1984 – Given (Mathew J. Vigliotti) (1:53.40)
- 1983 – Captivating Grace (Jean-Luc Samyn) (1:52.60)
- 1982 – Polite Rebuff (Ángel Cordero Jr.) (1:51.00)
- 1981 – Wayward Lass (Cash Asmussen) (1:50.00) (Grade I winner, Eclipse Champion Three Year Old Filly, 1981)
- 1980 – Darlin Momma (Jeffrey Fell) (1:54.00)
- 1979 – Advance Reason (Vincent Bracciale Jr.) (1:51.40)
- 1978 – Bemis Heights (Ron Turcotte) (1:48.00)
- 1977 – Road Princess (Jorge Velásquez) (1:45.40) (Grade I winner)
- 1976 – Secret Lanvin (Angel Santiago) (1:38.60)
- 1975 – Nicosia (Eddie Maple) (1:49.60)
- 1974 – Shy Dawn (Michael Hole) (1:51.20)
