= Flower Bowl Stakes =

- Class: Grade II
- Location: Saratoga Race Course; Saratoga Springs, New York, United States
- Inaugurated: 1978 (as Flower Bowl Handicap at Belmont Park)
- Race type: Thoroughbred – Flat racing
- Website: NYRA

Race information
- Distance: 1 3/8 miles
- Surface: Turf
- Track: Left-handed
- Qualification: Fillies and mares four-year-olds and older
- Weight: 124 lbs with allowances
- Purse: $500,000 (2023)
- Bonuses: Winner automatic entry into Breeders' Cup Filly & Mare Turf

The Flower Bowl Stakes is a Grade II American thoroughbred horse race for fillies and mares aged four years old and older over a distance of 1 3/8 miles on the turf held annually in early September at Saratoga Race Course in Saratoga Springs, New York.

== History ==
It had originally been run at Belmont Park from its inception in 1978 until 2020.

The race is part of the Breeders Cup Challenge series. The winner of the Flower Bowl automatically qualifies for the Breeders' Cup Filly & Mare Turf.

In 1987, the race was switched from turf to dirt due to heavy rain.

The race was named for Flower Bowl, a winner of the Ladies Handicap at Belmont Park and an outstanding broodmare.

In 2022 the event was downgraded by the American Graded Stakes Committee to Grade II status.

== Records ==
Speed record:

- 1 3/8 miles: 2:13.07 War Like Goddess (2021)
- 1 1/4 miles: 1:59.05 Lahudood (GB) (2007)

Margins:

- 13 lengths – Dahlia's Dreamer (1994)

Most wins:

- 2 – Riskaverse (2004, 2005)
- 2 – Stephanie's Kitten (2014, 2015)

Most wins by a jockey:

- 5 – John Velazquez (1998, 2006, 2012, 2014, 2019)

Most wins by a trainer:

- 9 – Chad C. Brown (2011, 2014, 2015, 2016, 2018, 2019, 2022, 2024, 2026)

Most wins by an owner:

- 5 – Peter M. Brant (1980, 1986, 1989, 2019, 2022)

== Winners ==
Year	Winner	Age	Jockey	Trainer	Owner	Distance	Time	Purse	Grade	Ref
At Belmont- Flower Bowl Stakes
2026	Kathynmarissa	5	Jose L. Ortiz	Chad C. Brown	Michael J. Caruso and Michael Dubb	1 1/4 miles	2:00.58	$500,000	II	
At Saratoga
2025	Bellezza (IRE)	4	Jamie Rodriguez	Miguel Clement	Moyglare Stud Farm	1 3/8 miles	2:14.80	$500,000	II	
2024	Idea Generation (IRE)	4	Florant Geroux	Chad C. Brown	Klaravich Stables	1 3/8 miles	2:18.97	$500,000	II	
2023	Parnac (FR)	4	Dylan Davis	Christophe Clement	West Point Thoroughbreds & Dream With Me Stable	1 3/8 miles	2:18.60	$465,000	II	
2022	Virginia Joy (GER)	5	Irad Ortiz Jr.	Chad C. Brown	Peter M. Brant	1 3/8 miles	2:19.51	$600,000	II	
2021	War Like Goddess	4	Julien Leparoux	William I. Mott	George Krikorian	1 3/8 miles	2:13.07	$600,000	I	
At Belmont Park
2020	Civil Union	5	Joel Rosario	Claude R. McGaughey III	Allen Stables	1 1/4 miles	2:01.28	$250,000	I	
2019	Sistercharlie (IRE)	5	John R. Velazquez	Chad C. Brown	Peter M. Brant	1 1/4 miles	2:02.21	$501,000	I	
2018	Fourstar Crook	6	Irad Ortiz Jr.	Chad C. Brown	Michael Dubb, Bethlehem Stables & Gary Aisquith	1 1/4 miles	2:03.28	$501,000	I	
2017	War Flag	4	Jose L. Ortiz	Claude R. McGaughey III	Allen Stables	1 1/4 miles	2:00.26	$500,000	I	
2016	Lady Eli	4	Irad Ortiz Jr.	Chad C. Brown	Sheep Pond Partners	1 1/4 miles	1:59.85	$500,000	I	
2015	Stephanie's Kitten	6	Irad Ortiz Jr.	Chad C. Brown	Kenneth & Sarah Ramsey	1 1/4 miles	2:06.23	$500,000	I	
2014	Stephanie's Kitten	5	John R. Velazquez	Chad C. Brown	Kenneth & Sarah Ramsey	1 1/4 miles	2:01.15	$600,000	I	
Flower Bowl Invitational Stakes
2013	§ Laughing (IRE)	5	Jose Lezcano	Alan E. Goldberg	Richard Santulli	1 1/4 miles	2:02.34	$600,000	I	
2012	Nahrain (GB)	4	John R. Velazquez	Roger Varian	Darley Stable	1 1/4 miles	2:05.56	$600,000	I	
2011	Stacelita (FR)	5	Ramon A. Dominguez	Chad C. Brown	Martin S. Schwartz	1 1/4 miles	2:10.39	$500,000	I	
2010	Ave (GB)	4	Javier Castellano	Roger L. Attfield	Three Chimneys Racing/Harris	1 1/4 miles	2:08.54	$500,000	I	
2009	Pure Clan	4	Julien R. Leparoux	Robert E. Holthus	Lakland Farm	1 1/4 miles	2:12.43	$600,000	I	
2008	Dynaforce	5	Alan Garcia	William I. Mott	Dr. John A. Chandler	1 1/4 miles	2:07.59	$588,000	I	
2007	Lahudood (GB)	4	Alan Garcia	Kiaran P. McLaughlin	Shadwell Racing	1 1/4 miles	1:59.05	$600,000	I	
2006	Honey Ryder	5	John R. Velazquez	Todd A. Pletcher	Glencrest Farm	1 1/4 miles	2:02.47	$588,000	I	
2005	Riskaverse	6	Jose A. Santos	Patrick J. Kelly	Fox Ridge Farm	1 1/4 miles	2:00.27	$750,000	I	
2004	Riskaverse	5	Cornelio Velasquez	Patrick J. Kelly	Fox Ridge Farm	1 1/4 miles	2:04.65	$750,000	I	
2003	Dimitrova	3	Jerry D. Bailey	Dermot K. Weld	Joseph Higgins	1 1/4 miles	2:02.74	$750,000	I	
2002	Kazzia (GER)	3	Jorge F. Chavez	Saeed bin Suroor	Godolphin Racing	1 1/4 miles	2:05.22	$750,000	I	
2001	Lailani (GB)	3	Jerry D. Bailey	Edward A.L. Dunlop	Maktoum bin Rashid Al Maktoum	1 1/4 miles	2:01.88	$750,000	I	
Flower Bowl Invitational Handicap
2000	Colstar	4	Jean-Luc Samyn	Paul R. Fout	Beverly R. Steinman	1 1/4 miles	2:01.78	$750,000	I	
1999	Soaring Softly	4	Jerry D. Bailey	James J. Toner	Joan G. & John W. Phillips	1 1/4 miles	2:01.41	$500,000	I	
1998	Auntie Mame	4	John R. Velazquez	Angel A. Penna Jr.	Lazy F Ranch	1 1/4 miles	1:59.33	$400,000	I	
1997	Yashmak	3	Corey Nakatani	Henry Cecil	Juddmonte Farms	1 1/4 miles	1:59.73	$400,000	I	
1996	Chelsey Flower	5	Robbie Davis	Nicholas P. Zito	Farfellow Farm	1 1/4 miles	2:05.96	$350,000	I	
1995	Northern Emerald	6	Ramon B. Perez	William I. Mott	Hiram Polk Jr. & J. David Richardson	1 1/4 miles	2:06.68	$200,000	I	
1994	Dahlia's Dreamer	5	Jorge F. Chavez	William I. Mott	Madeleine Paulson	1 1/4 miles	2:05.52	$200,000	I	
Flower Bowl Handicap
1993	Far Out Beast	6	Jean-Luc Samyn	Philip G. Johnson	Sullimar Stable	1 1/4 miles	2:03.88	$150,000	I	
1992	Christiecat	5	Jean-Luc Samyn	Patrick J. Kelly	Fox Ridge Farm	1 1/4 miles	2:01.06	$200,000	I	
1991	Lady Shirl	4	Richard Migliore	P. Noel Hickey	P. Noel Hickey	1 1/4 miles	2:02.43	$200,000	I	
1990	Laugh and Be Merry	5	Herb McCauley	Angel A. Penna Jr.	Pin Oak Stable	1 1/4 miles	2:00.20	$131,400	I	
1989	River Memories	5	Pat Day	D. Wayne Lukas	Peter M. Brant	1 1/4 miles	2:06.80	$124,800	I	
1988	Gaily Gaily (IRE)	5	Julie Krone	William I. Mott	Diana M. Firestone	1 1/4 miles	2:02.80	$128,000	I	
1987	Slew's Exceller	5	Jose A. Santos	Thomas J. Skiffington	Keith Myers	1 1/4 miles	2:02.20	$129,200	I	
1986	§ Dismasted	3	Jean-Luc Samyn	Philip G. Johnson	Peter M. Brant	1 1/4 miles	2:00.40	$127,200	I	Dead heat
1986	Scoot	4	Bill Shoemaker	LeRoy Jolley	Edward P. Evans	1 1/4 miles	2:00.40	$127,200	I	Dead heat
1985	Dawn's Curtsey	3	Eddie Maple	John M. Veitch	Darby Dan Farm	1 1/4 miles	2:02.20	$123,400	I	
1984	Rossard (DEN)	4	Laffit Pincay Jr.	Evan S. Jackson	Catherine T. Koffend	1 1/4 miles	2:03.40	$121,400	I	
1983	First Approach	5	Jorge Velasquez	Jonathan E. Sheppard	Augustin Stable	1 1/4 miles	2:00.20	$113,600	I	
1982	Trevita (IRE)	5	Ruben Hernandez	Jonathan E. Sheppard	Augustin Stable	1 1/4 miles	2:01.40	$119,800	I	
1981	Rokeby Rose	4	Jeffrey Fell	MacKenzie Miller	Rokeby Stables	1 1/4 miles	2:01.60	$112,000	II	
1980	Just A Game II (IRE)	4	Don Brumfield	David A. Whiteley	Peter M. Brant	1 1/4 miles	2:00.80	$114,400	II	
1979	Pearl Necklace	5	Bill Shoemaker	Roger Laurin	Reginald N. Webster	1 1/4 miles	2:02.20	$113,600		
1978	Waya (FR)	4	Angel Cordero Jr.	Angel Penna Sr.	Daniel Wildenstein	1 1/4 miles	2:00.60	$54,150		

Legend:
Dirt Turf
Notes:
§ Ran as an entry

== See also ==
List of American and Canadian Graded races
