= Juan González Arintero =

Spanish religious priest (1860–1928)

Servant of God Juan González Arintero OP
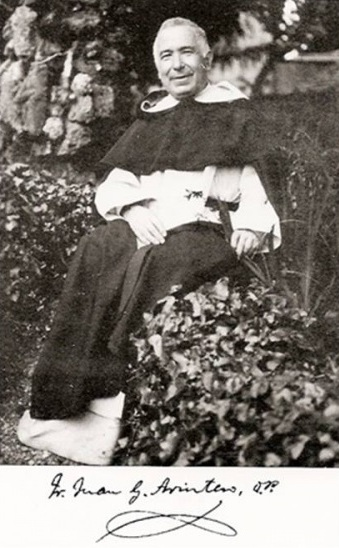
- Born: Juan Tomás González y González-Arintero; 24 June 1860; Valdelugueros, León, Spain
- Died: 20 February 1928 (aged 67); Salamanca, Spain

Juan González Arintero, OP (24 June 1860 – 20 February 1928) was a Spanish Catholic priest of the Order of Preachers.

== Biography ==
=== Early life ===
Arintero was born in Lugueros, León, and entered the convent of the Dominican Order at Corias (Asturias) in 1875. He took the religious habit in 1879. In 1881, he entered the University of Navarra and was ordained a priest in 1883. In 1886, he completed his studies in physical-chemical sciences and in 1908, he obtained the degree of Doctor of Theology.

As a specialist in the natural sciences, he taught at colleges in Vergara, Corias, Valladolid and later at the Pontifical University of Saint Thomas Aquinas, Angelicum in Rome. In Salamanca, he became friends with Marie-Joseph Lagrange.

=== Career ===
In Salamanca, Arintero founded the "Scientific-Apologetic Academy of Saint Thomas". In 1921, he founded in Bilbao the magazine La Vida Sobrenatural. He contributed to the restoration of mystical studies in Spain at the beginning of the 20th century and spread many ideas about mysticism, holiness and perfection that later influenced the Second Vatican Council.

Arintero excelled in reconciling faith and scientific postulates. He defined his theses on the evolution of species in his eight-volume work entitled La Evolución y la Filosofía Cristiana ("Evolution and Christian Philosophy"), in which he argues that there are two types of species, "an immutable species whose creation corresponded only to God, and another species, the organic species, which was derived from the first and which, thanks to the accidents explained by scientific evolution, was creating varieties such as genders or races. For Arintero, there was a divine order that always prevailed, and then a game of minor changes."

Arintero died in Salamanca on 20 February 1928 at the age of 67.

== Beatification ==
His cause for beatification has been initiated by the Roman Catholic Diocese of Salamanca since 5 August 1976.

== Works ==
=== In Spanish ===
- 1892: El Diluvio Universal Demostrado por la Geologia
- 1898: La Evolución y la Filosofía Cristiana
- 1901: El Hexámeron y la Ciencia Moderna
- 1904: Teología y Teofobia
- 1908: Evolución Mística
- 1911: Evolución Doctrinal
- 1916: Cuestiones Místicas
- 1919: Exposición Mística del Cantar de los Cantares
- 1920: La Sulamitis: María Inmaculada, ideal del alma religiosa
- 1923: Las Escalas del Amor; reedición 2020 - Introducción

=== In English translation ===
- 1949: The Mystical Evolution in the Development and Vitality of the Church
- 1957: Stages in Prayer

== See also ==
- Marie-Joseph Lagrange
- Neo-Scholasticism
- Ramiro de Maeztu
