= Juan González Gómez =

Telecommunications Engineer, Ph.D. in Robotics

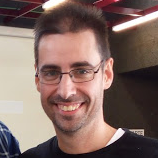
- Juan González "Obijuan" en Ourense Makers Lab en noviembre de 2016
- Website: http://www.iearobotics.com/

Juan González Gómez "Obijuan" (née Juan González Gómez, born January 18, 1973, in Madrid, Spain) is a doctor in computer science and telecommunications publicly recognized for having become the first Spanish winner of the O'Reilly Open Source Award.

Juan is one of the pioneers of open source educational robotics in Spain. Inspired in the RepRap community created by Adrian Bowyer in 2004, Juan pioneered the diffusion of free 3D printing and is credited with being the founder of the CloneWars community, which brought together up to 4,000 Spanish-speaking members. Juan acquired the eighth RepRap 3D printer of the world (manufactured by Makerbot) and he edited a series of 63 video-tutorials for the Spanish community which comprised the step by step instructions to assembly from scratch a Prusa 2 model and became very popular. He also continued its production of open online courses (MOOC), grouped under the brand Obijuan Academy, among which stand out as a reference for the entire maker community the series of 74 video tutorials using the opensource tool FreeCAD with more than 13,000 followers on YouTube.

In 2013, Juan joined BQ as the R&D and Robotics Director. After 3D printing, Juan focused on the promotion of FPGAs by offering designs, tutorials and workshops with the aim of forming a community of users and also spread it to the world of robotics and educational electronics. In 2016, he left BQ and created FPGAWars.

In addition to his teaching and research experience in several universities (Technical University of Madrid, Autonomous University of Madrid, Charles III University of Madrid, Pontifical University of Salamanca), Juan also collaborates with NGOs as fablab manager at the La Rueca Association's TecnoLab, which is aimed at people at risk of social exclusion.
