= Karakontie =

Japanese-bred Thoroughbred racehorse

- Racing silks of Niarchos Family
- Sire: Bernstein
- Grandsire: Storm Cat
- Dam: Sun Is Up
- Damsire: Sunday Silence
- Sex: Stallion
- Foaled: 30 January 2011
- Country: Japan
- Colour: Bay
- Breeder: Flaxman Holdings or Shiraoi Farm, Shadai Corporation Ltd
- Owner: Niarchos Family
- Trainer: Jonathan Pease
- Record: 12: 5-2-1
- Earnings: £1,151,689

Major wins
- Prix La Rochette (2013); Prix Jean-Luc Lagardère (2013); Poule d'Essai des Poulains (2014); Breeders' Cup Mile (2014)

Karakontie (foaled 30 January 2011) is a Japanese-bred, French-trained Thoroughbred racehorse. He was one of the best French-trained two-year-olds of 2013 when he won three of his four races including the Prix La Rochette and Prix Jean-Luc Lagardère. He returned to win the Poule d'Essai des Poulains on his second start as a three-year-old but was given a long break after running poorly in the Prix du Jockey Club. On his return to the track in autumn he recorded his biggest win when taking the Breeders' Cup Mile.

== Background ==
Karakontie is a bay horse with a narrow white blaze bred in Japan by Flaxman Holdings a bloodstock company owned by the Niarchos Family. He was sired by the sprinter Bernstein, who won the Railway Stakes and the Concorde Stakes when trained in Ireland by Aidan O'Brien. Karakontie's dam, Sun Is Up, was unsuccessful racehorse, but was a daughter of Kentucky Derby and Breeders' Cup Classic winner Sunday Silence, and granddaughter of Stavros Niarchos' Miesque, a multiple Group One winner in Europe and twice successful in the Breeders' Cup Mile. Miesque became an influential broodmare, producing Kingmambo and East of the Moon as well as Karakontie's grand-dam Moon Is Up.

"Karakontie" means "flying sun" in the Mohawk language, which references his dam's name.

The Niarchos family sent Karakontie into training with Jonathan Pease at Chantilly in France. He has been ridden in all but one of his races by Stéphane Pasquier.

== Racing career ==
=== 2013: two-year-old season ===
Karakontie began his racing career at Compiègne on 1 July when he won the Prix du Mont Saint-Jean over 1400 metres, beating the favourite Ectot by one and a half lengths. In August he contested the Listed Prix François Boutin over the same distance at Deauville Racecourse and finished second, beaten a short-head by the British-trained colt Bunker. Four weeks later the colt was moved up in class for the Group Three Prix La Rochette at Longchamp Racecourse and started the 4/1 third favourite behind the André Fabre-trained Decathlete and the Aga Khan's colt Daraybi. Ridden for the first and only time by Olivier Peslier, he was towards the rear of the seven runner field, but finished strongly to take the lead in the final strides and won by three quarters of a length from Decathlete. Peslier said "He was a little caught out when they first quickened up but he really picked up when it mattered". On 6 October, Karakontie was reunited with Pasquier and started 11/4 favourite for the Group One Prix Jean-Luc Lagardère at Longchamp. Pasquier positioned the colt behind the Spanish colt Noozhoh Canarias before taking the lead 200 metres from the finish and winning by three quarters of a length. Charm Spirit was a length and a quarter away in third ahead of the Anglesey Stakes winner Wilshire Boulevard and the British-trained Barley Mow. Pease commented "He had to grind it out and I thought he had a bit more brilliance but he got the job done."

=== 2014: three-year-old season ===
Karakontie began his second season in the Prix de Fontainebleau over 1600 metres at Longchamp on 13 April in which he finished second, beaten a neck by Ectot. The winner sustained an injury in the race and missed the Poule d'Essai des Poulains on 11 May for which Karakontie was made 6/4 favourite on rain-softened ground. Pasquier positioned the colt just behind the leaders before moving up on the inside in the straight. Karakontie took the lead 200 metres from the finish and held off the persistent challenge of Prestige Vendome to win by a neck. The Niarchos family's racing manager Alan Cooper said "bravo to the horse because the rain didn't help his cause but he is tough. It was a good performance and he has strengthened up over the winter". Karakontie was moved up in distance for the Prix du Jockey Club over 2000 metres at Chantilly on 1 June. He started the 6/1 second favourite but never looked likely to win and finished eighth behind The Grey Gatsby.

After a break of four months, Karakontie returned in the Prix de la Forêt over 1400 metres at Longchamp on 5 October. After being repeatedly blocked and denied a clear run he finished eleventh of the fourteen runners behind Olympic Glory. Karakontie was then sent to California and started a 30/1 outsider for the thirty-first running of the Breeders' Cup Mile at Santa Anita Park on 1 November. The British four-year-old Toronado was made favourite ahead of the dual Shoemaker Mile winner Obviously, the Irish-trained Jersey Stakes winner Mustajeeb and the Eddie Read Stakes winner Tom's Tribute. In the early stages, Pasquier settled his mount in midfield as Obviously and Toronado set a very fast pace. Karakontie began to make progress three furlongs out, turned into the straight in fifth and accelerated through the field to overtake Obviously inside the final furlong. He held off a late challenge from another French-trained challenger Anodin to win by a length with the British-trained Woodbine Mile winner Trade Storm a length away in third. After the race, Pasquier said Emotionally this is the biggest win of my career; to win a Breeders' Cup race in America. I just rode him like the quality horse he is. A mile is his distance", whilst Pease commented "He was a brilliant 2-year-old and was very good this spring. We gave him a break (after the spring races) and he showed us a great turn of foot today".

== Stud career ==
Karakontie stands at Gainesway Farm for a service fee of $10,000.

=== Notable progeny ===
c = colt, f = filly, g = gelding

Foaled	Name	Sex	Major Wins
2019	Spendarella	f	Del Mar Oaks
2021	She Feels Pretty	f	Natalma Stakes, Queen Elizabeth II Challenge Cup, American Oaks, New York Stakes, E P Taylor Stakes

== Pedigree ==
Pedigree of Karakontie (JPN), bay colt, 2011
Sire Bernstein (USA) 1997	Storm Cat (USA); 1983	Storm Bird	Northern Dancer
Sire Bernstein (USA) 1997	Storm Cat (USA); 1983	Storm Bird	South Ocean
Sire Bernstein (USA) 1997	Storm Cat (USA); 1983	Terlingua	Secretariat
Sire Bernstein (USA) 1997	Storm Cat (USA); 1983	Terlingua	Crimson Saint
Sire Bernstein (USA) 1997	La Affirmed (USA); 1983	Affirmed	Exclusive Native
Sire Bernstein (USA) 1997	La Affirmed (USA); 1983	Affirmed	Won't Tell You
Sire Bernstein (USA) 1997	La Affirmed (USA); 1983	La Mesa	Round Table
Sire Bernstein (USA) 1997	La Affirmed (USA); 1983	La Mesa	Finance
Dam Sun Is Up (JPN) 1998	Sunday Silence (USA); 1986	Halo	Hail To Reason
Dam Sun Is Up (JPN) 1998	Sunday Silence (USA); 1986	Halo	Cosmah
Dam Sun Is Up (JPN) 1998	Sunday Silence (USA); 1986	Wishing Well	Understanding
Dam Sun Is Up (JPN) 1998	Sunday Silence (USA); 1986	Wishing Well	Mountain Flower
Dam Sun Is Up (JPN) 1998	Moon Is Up (USA); 1993	Woodman	Mr. Prospector
Dam Sun Is Up (JPN) 1998	Moon Is Up (USA); 1993	Woodman	Playmate
Dam Sun Is Up (JPN) 1998	Moon Is Up (USA); 1993	Miesque	Nureyev
Dam Sun Is Up (JPN) 1998	Moon Is Up (USA); 1993	Miesque	Pasadoble (Family: 20)
