= Shine Again Stakes =

- Class: Ungraded Stakes
- Location: Pimlico Race Course, Baltimore, Maryland, United States
- Inaugurated: 2006
- Race type: Thoroughbred - Flat racing
- Website: www.pimlico.com

Race information
- Distance: 1 1/16 miles (8.5 furlongs)
- Surface: Dirt
- Track: Left-handed
- Qualification: Three-year-olds & up; fillies & mares
- Weight: Assigned
- Purse: $50,000

The Shine Again Stakes is an American Thoroughbred horse race held annually at Pimlico Race Course in Baltimore, Maryland. Contested over a distance of one mile and one sixteenth (eight and a half furlongs) on the dirt, it is open to fillies and mares three-years-old and up that are Registered Maryland-breds.

== History ==
Run during the latter part of May as part of Preakness week, the race was named in honor of Shine Again, a fourth generation homebred in the Allaire du Pont stable. Shine Again was brilliant over three seasons of competition in which she was named Maryland-bred horse of the Year in 2003, Maryland-bred champion older mare in three consecutive years while earning state-bred champion sprinter title in two of those years. She retired after the 2003 season as the ninth leading Maryland-bred money earner of all time, with $1,271,840. From 34 career starts, she won 14 races (eight stakes), was second 10 times (eight stakes) and third in seven others (five stakes).

Shine Again was a daughter of Wild Again out of the Two Punch mare Shiner. Shine Again was under the guidance of Hall of Fame trainer H. Allen Jerkens, she won four stakes races that season including the Grade 1 Ballerina Handicap at Saratoga Race Course plus the Grade 2 First Flight Handicap and placed in four other Graded stakes races. The very next year she returned to defend her titles in the Ballerina and the First Flight and won both, she also had five graded stakes placings including the grade one Ruffian Handicap. She just missed the three-peat in the Ballerina at age six, finishing second by a neck. In that year she won the grade two Genuine Risk Handicap while placing in five other additional graded stakes races.

The race has also been won by trainers who later achieved success at the highest levels of American Thoroughbred racing, including Cherie DeVaux, who went on to become the first female trainer to win the Kentucky Derby in 2026.

== Records ==
Speed record:

- 1 1/16 miles - 1:45.40 - Katie's Love (2006)

Most wins by a jockey:

- 3 - Luis Garcia (2006, 2008 & 2009)

Most wins by a trainer:

- No trainer has won the Shine Again Stakes more than once

== Winners of the Shine Again Stakes ==
Year	Winner	Age	Jockey	Trainer	Owner	Distance	Time	Purse
2021	Chub Wagon	4	Jomar Torres	Guadalupe Preciado	Daniel Lopez & George Chestnut	6 fur.	1:10.21	$100,000
2020	No Race	-	No Race	No Race	No Race	no race	0:00.00	no race
2019	Our Super Freak	3	Jose Ortiz	Cherie DeVaux	LBD Stable LLC & David Ingordo	7 fur.	1:22.98	$100,000
2018	Cairenn	4	John R. Velazquez	H. Graham Motion	WSS Racing, LLC	7 fur.	1:22.11	$100,000
2017	Line of Best Fit	7	Kevin Gomez	Claudio A. Gonzalez	Sheffield Stable LLC	1 mile	1:23.90	$50,000
2016	Sothern Girl	3	Abel Castellano	J. Larry Jones	Fox Hill Farms Inc.	1 mile	1:24.11	$50,000
2015	No Race	-	No Race	No Race	No Race	no race	0:00.00	no race
2014	No Race	-	No Race	No Race	No Race	no race	0:00.00	no race
2013	Daydreamin Gracie	5	Garry Cruise	Dane Kobiskie	PTK LLC	1-1/16	1:46.30	$50,000
2012	Sneaky Lil	6	Abel Castellano	Jamie Ness	Richard Blue Jr.	1-1/16	1:47.00	$50,000
2011	D Day	6	Jeremy Rose	Samuel F. Cronk	Samuel F. Cronk’s	1-1/16	1:47.08	$50,000
2010	American Victory	4	Travis Dunkelberger	Rodney Jenkins	Richard Golden	1-1/16	1:47.51	$50,000
2009	Amie’s Legend	4	Luis Garcia	H. Graham Motion	Two Legends Farm	1-1/16	1:45.20	$50,000
2008	Come Fly Away	4	Luis Garcia	Michael Hushion	Bill & Vicki Poston	1-1/16	1:44.75	$50,000
2007	Katie's Love	5	Horacio Karamanos	Nancy H. Alberts	Lewis Racing Stable	1-1/16	1:45.51	$50,000
2006	Dynamic Deputy	4	Luis Garcia	Richard W. Small	Fitzhugh, LLC	1-1/16	1:45.74	$50,000

== See also ==
- Shine Again Stakes top three finishers and starters
- Pimlico Race Course
- List of graded stakes at Pimlico Race Course
