= Skipat Stakes top three finishers and starters =

This is a listing of the horses that finished in either first, second, or third place and the number of starters in the Skipat Stakes, an American stakes race for fillies and mares three years old and older at 6 furlongs on the dirt held at Pimlico Race Course in Baltimore, Maryland. (List 1993-present)

Year	Winner	Second	Third	Starters
2026	Striker Has Dial	Benedetta	Passage East	5
2025	Zeitlos	Striker Has Dial	One Magic Philly	6
2024	Apple Picker	Swall	Late Frost	7
2023	Cheetara (CHI)	Olivia Darling	I’m the Boss of me	8
2022	Joy's Rocket	Fille d'Esprit	Time Limint	8
2021	Chub Wagon	Casual	Club Car	8
2020	Never Enough Time	Bronx Beauty	Bye Bye J	7
2019	Chalon	Everlasting Secret	Hailey's Flip	10
2018	Vertical Oak	Startwithsilver	Ms Locust Point	5
2017	Clipthecouponannie	Summer Reading	Sweet On Smokey	9
2016	Disco Chick	Dallas Cowgirl	Fantastic Style	9
2015	Galiana	Lady Sabelia	She's Ordained	9
2014	Lion D N A	Flattering Bea	Winning Image	9
2013	Dance to Bristol	Orange's Lil Sis	Kalambaka Queen	7
2012	Bold Affair	Valiant Passion	Afleet Lass	7
2011	No Race	No Race	No Race	n/a
2010	Lights Off Annie	Streetscape	Beware of the Bop	6
2009	All Giving	Fancy Diamond	Mikeslittlegirl	6
2008	Akronism	My Sister Sue	Acinonyx	6
2007	Silmaril	My Sister Sue	Homesteader	n/a
2006	Trickle of Gold	Spirited Game	Chrusciki	n/a
2005	Spring Rush	Princess Pelona	Forestier	n/a
2004	Love You Madly	Wallop	Leavn Ona Jetplane	n/a
2003	Bronze Abe	Skip the Print	Shiny Sheet	n/a
2002	Madame Roar	Prized Stamp	Karaoke Dancer	n/a
2001	Big Bambu	Superduper Miss	Ivy's Jewel	n/a
2000	Lilly's Affair	Elektraline	Angelina Capote	n/a
1999	Crab Grass	Passeggiata	Tookin Down	n/a
1998	Weather Vane	Little Sister	Creamy Dreamy	n/a
1997	Conradley	Heavenly Punch	Creamy Dreamy	n/a
1996	Cherokee Wonder	Wild Lady A.	Broad Smile	n/a
1995	Smart 'n Noble	Oh Summer	Wild Lady A.	n/a
1994	Wild Lady A.	Flash Number Two	Morning Bagel	n/a
1993	Tripp Trial	Lip Sing	Jazzy One	n/a

== See also ==
- List of graded stakes at Pimlico Race Course
