= Shine Again Stakes top three finishers and starters =

This is a listing of the horses that finished in either first, second, or third place and the number of starters in the Shine Again Stakes, an American stakes race for fillies and mares three years old and older at one mile and one sixteenth (8.5 furlongs) on the dirt held for Registered Maryland-breds at Pimlico Race Course in Baltimore, Maryland. (List 2006–present)

| Year | Winner | Second | Third | Starters |
|---|---|---|---|---|
| 2021 | Chub Wagon | Hello Beautiful | Paisley Singing | 8 |
| 2020 | No Race | No Race | No Race | - |
| 2019 | Our Super Freak | Steamy Hot | Saguaro Row | 9 |
| 2018 | Caireen | Tweeting | Angel at War | 8 |
| 2017 | Line of Best Fit | Summer House | Lake Ponchatrain | 9 |
| 2016 | Southern Girl | Boheme de Lavi | La Madrina | 8 |
| 2015 | No Race | No Race | No Race | - |
| 2014 | No Race | No Race | No Race | - |
| 2013 | Daydreamin Gracie | Touch the Birds | Franstein | 8 |
| 2012 | Sneaky Lil | All About Her | Touch the Birds | 8 |
| 2011 | D Day | Grandiloquent | Amelia's Brio | 7 |
| 2010 | American Victory | Hannah’s Dowery | Heaven’s Voice | 9 |
| 2009 | Amie’s Legend | Five Diamonds | Eye | 7 |
| 2008 | Come Fly Away | Take a Check | Hanalei Bay | 7 |
| 2007 | Katie's Love | Unbridled Grace | Take a Check | 9 |
| 2006 | Dynamic Deputy | Hanalei Bay | Take a Check | 7 |

== See also ==
- List of graded stakes at Pimlico Race Course
