= The Very One Stakes top three finishers =

List of horses that have finished in the top three in The Very One Stakes races

This is a listing of the horses that finished in either first, second, or third place and the number of starters in The Very One Stakes, an American stakes race for fillies and mares three years old and older at 5 furlongs on the turf held at Pimlico Race Course in Baltimore, Maryland. (List 1973–present)

Year	Winner	Second	Third	Starters
2026	Sunna	Saturday Flirt	Lost and Found	8
2025	Bosserati	Accomplished Girl	Gift Of Gab	12
2024	Future Is Now	Shoshanah	Hollywood Walk	10
2023	Train To Artemus	Spicy Marg	Spun Glass	9
2022	Can The Queen	Honey Pants	Whispurring Kitten	9
2021	Caravel	Gotta Go Mo	Victory Kingdom	12
2020	A Great Time	Mr. Al's Gal	Ode to Joy	14
2019	Wild about Star	Jo Jo Air	Misericordia	9
2018	Girl Knows Best	Pretty Perfection	Anna’s Bandit	8
2017	Suffused	Quiet kitten	Paige	8
2016	Lady Shipman	Joya Real	Exaggerated	12
2015	Ageless	Joya Real	Aquinnah DH; Shrinking Violet DH	11
2014	Ageless	Perfect Measure	Quality Lass	14
2013	Sensible Lady	Nechez Dawn	Donna Getyourgun	14
2012	Sensible Lady	Jazzy Idea	Inspired	11
2011	Suzzona	Supreme	Rose Catherine	10
2010	Starfish Bay	Suzzona	Kosmo's Buddy	10
2009	Criticism	Dress Rehearsal	Backseat Rhythm	n/a
2008	All Giving	Cat On A Cloud	Smart and Fancy	n/a
2007	Unbridled Sidney	Wild Berry	Keep On Talking	n/a
2006	Gilded Gold	Bright Gold	Kiss Me Katie	n/a
2005	Gabianna	Feisty Bull	Nicole's Dream	n/a
2004	Go Go Baby Go	Oh Say Vicki	Boozin' Susan	n/a
2003	Forest Heiress	Maria's Mirage	New Year's Eve Gala	n/a
2002	Merry Princess	Maypole Dance	Scootin' Girl	n/a
2001	Confessional	Merry Princess	Dressy Dress	8
1994	2000	No Races	No Races	n/a
1993	Logan's Mist	Hopeful Angel	Amber Princess	n/a

== See also ==
- List of graded stakes at Pimlico Race Course
