= Jim McKay Turf Sprint top three finishers =

This is a listing of the horses that finished in either first, second, or third place and the number of starters in the Jim McKay Turf Sprint, an American stakes race for three-year-olds and older at 5 furlongs on the turf held at Pimlico Race Course in Baltimore, Maryland.

Year	Winner	Second	Third	Starters
2026	Chasing Liberty	Outlaw Kid	Card Trick	10
2025	Witty	No Nay Hudson (IRE)	Determined Kingdom	7
2024	Grooms All Bizness	Witty	Smooth B	10
2023	Beer Can Man	Nothing Better	Coppola	8
2022	Carotari	Smokin' Jay	Seven Scents	9
2021	Firecrow	The Critical Way	Completed Pass	13
2020	Hollis	Completed Pass	Love You Much	10
2019	Completed Pass	Tempt Me Twice	Tricks to Do	9
2018	Imprimis	Rocket Heat	Oak Bluffs	10
2017	Richard's Boy	Pay Any Price	Amelia's Wild Ride	14
2016	Ben's Cat	Spring to the Sky	Rocket Heat	8
2015	Ben's Cat	Bold Thunder	Amelia's Wild Ride	10
2014	Ben's Cat	Great Attack	Smash and Grab	9
2013	Ben's Cat	Spring to the Sky	Bridgetown	8
2012	Fiddles Patriot	Super Chunky	Ju Jitsu Jax	12
2011	Ben's Cat	Local Celebrity	Super Chunky	11
2010	Central City	Sacred Journey	Heros Reward	9
2009	Mr. Nightlinger	Blue Sailor	Rouse the Cat	11
2008	Hero's Reward	True to Tradition	Blue Sailor	11
2007	Hero's Reward	Bingobear	Mr. Mutter	10
2006	My Lord	Southern Missile	Spring Kitten	8

== See also ==
- Jim McKay Turf Sprint
- Pimlico Race Course
- List of graded stakes at Pimlico Race Course
