= Hilltop Stakes top three finishers =

This is a listing of the horses that finished in either first, second, or third place and the number of starters in the Hilltop Stakes, an American stakes race for three-year-old fillies at 1-1/16 miles on the turf held at Pimlico Race Course in Baltimore, Maryland. (List 1973-present)

Year	Winner	Second	Third	Starters
2026	Coach Mazzula	Ultimate Love	Brat Pack	6
2025	Play With Fire	Pretty Lavish (IRE)	Princess Attitude	8
2024	She Feels Pretty	Just Better	Waves of Mischief	7
2023	Aspray	Breath Away	Hang The Moon	11
2022	Pizza Bianca	Diamond Hands	Vergara	8
2021	Alda	Seasons	Arm Candy	13
2020	Evil Lyn	Vigilantes Way	Caravel	13
2019	Dogtag	Nova Sol	Fashion Faux Pas	14
2018	Souper Striking	Secret Message	Peach of a Gal	10
2017	Happy Mesa	Compelled	Dynatail	10
2016	Gone Away	Family Meeting	Wessex	14
2015	Miss Temple City	All in Fun	Lady Zuzu	10
2014	Our Epiphany	Tupancy Links	Southern Equity	8
2013	Emotional Kitten	Summer of Fun	Zenzara	11
2012	Coup	Seanchai	Ainsley	8
2011	Excited	Pink Pallet	Blushandbashful	13
2010	Joharmony	Kit Kats Luck	Potosina	6
2009	Blind Date	Listentothewindblo	Glamorous Gal	n/a
2008	Hartigan	No Use Denying	Inventive	n/a
2007	Street Sounds	Ethan's Car	Cabbage Key	n/a
2006	Ebony Rose	Its Just a Dream	Art Show	n/a
2005	My Typhoon	Flashy Three	Rutledge Ballado	n/a
2004	Western Ransom	Art Fan	Star of Anziyan	n/a
2003	City Fire	Impolite	Apple Juice	n/a
2002	Ntombi	Smart Grace	Restraining Order	n/a
2001	Guillotine	Tweedside	Dear Pickles	n/a
2000	Azireprice	Good Game	Kobold	n/a
1999	Polish Miss	Valarone	Mi Mi Mine	n/a
1998	Proud Owner	Tappin' Ginger	Caveat Competor	n/a
1997	Earth to Jackie	Cozy Blues	Hoochie Coochie	n/a
1996	Silent Greeting	Polish Lass	Pookshawk	n/a
1995	Jhenais Jewel	Blue Sky Princess	Transient Trend	n/a
1994	Irish Forever	Promiseville	Lady Ellen	n/a
1993	Open Toe	Exotic Sea	Perkins Star	n/a
1992	Captive Miss	Logan's Mist	Red Ice	n/a
1991	Grab the Green	Stem the Tide	Madam Sandie	n/a
1990	Valay Maid	Mymet	Tammany Doll	n/a
1989	Seraglio	Pleasantly Free	Lady Bemissed	n/a
1988	Another Paddock	Empress Tigere	Wishful Nickle	n/a
1987	Arctic Cloud	Notastar	Too Smart Too Late	n/a
1986	Country Recital	Lost Reason	Green Boundary	n/a
1985	A Joyful Spray	Apalgaffey	Aube d'Or	n/a
1984	Squan Song	Miss Knowitall	Grim Exchange	n/a
1983	Final Chapter	Owned by All	Go Rachel	n/a
1982	Martie's Double	Wise Colleen	Swift Attraction	n/a
1981	Anti Phil	Escapement	Play It Now	n/a
1980	Weber City Miss	Denim Gal	Foolish Spoon	n/a
1979	Heavy Sugar	Phoebe's Donkey	A Realgirl	n/a
1978	Caesar's Wish	Silver Ice	Bonaventure Girl	n/a
1977	Enthused	Debby's Turn	Silklady	n/a
1976	Dance My Love	Siz Ziz Zit	Gala Occasion	n/a
1975	Quick Selection	Footsie	Chief's Call	n/a
1974	Four Bells	Dream On Cindy	Pago Dancer	n/a
1973	Maybe Crafty	Rambelle	Softly	n/a

== See also ==
- Hilltop Stakes
- Pimlico Race Course
- List of graded stakes at Pimlico Race Course
