= She Feels Pretty =

American thoroughbred racehorse (foaled 2021)

- Sire: Karakontie
- Grandsire: Bernstein
- Dam: Summer Sweet
- Damsire: More Than Ready
- Sex: Mare
- Foaled: March 12, 2021
- Country: United States
- Color: Chestnut
- Breeder: Payson Stud
- Owner: Lael Stables
- Trainer: Cherie DeVaux
- Record: 13: 8-3-2
- Earnings: $2,550,592

Major wins
- Natalma Stakes (2023); Queen Elizabeth II Challenge Cup Stakes (2024); American Oaks (2024); New York Stakes (2025); E.P. Taylor Stakes (2025)

Awards
- American Champion Female Turf Horse (2025)

She Feels Pretty is an American thoroughbred racehorse who won multiple Grade 1 races in 2023, 2024, and 2025, including the Natalma Stakes, Queen Elizabeth II Challenge Cup Stakes and E.P. Taylor Stakes. She was also the winner of the Eclipse Award for American Champion Female Turf Horse in 2025.

== Background ==
She Feels Pretty is a chestnut mare, bred in Kentucky by Payson Stud. She was foaled on March 12, 2021, and is out of Summer Sweet, a race winning mare out of More Than Ready, the 2000 winner of the Kings Bishop Stakes. She is a daughter of Karakontie, a classic winner over a mile in France in the Poule d'Essai Des Poulains and eventually in the United States in the Breeders' Cup Mile. As a yearling, she sold for $240,000 to Lael Stable from Stone Farm.

== Racing career ==
She Feels Pretty began her racing career as a two year old filly in July 2023, breaking her maiden at Ellis Park in Kentucky. Presaging later races she would run, She Feels Pretty started near the back of the pack before finishing strong, charging down the straight to defeat her closest rival by a neck. Stepped up sharply in class next time out, She Feels Pretty was next sent north of the border to Canada to Woodbine to contest the Natalma Stakes, traditionally run as an automatic qualifier for the Breeders' Cup Juvenile Fillies Turf. Running once again with her late closing style, She Feels Pretty opened up 4 1/4 lengths over her competition in taking this premier race for juvenile turf fillies. Taking up the opportunity won by claiming the Natalma Stakes, She Feels Pretty was sent on to the Breeders' Cup Juvenile Fillies Turf at Santa Anita to finish her two year old campaign, where she finished a close third.

For her first assignment at age 3 in 2024, She Feels Pretty took on the Hilltop Stakes. Run at Pimlico Race Course on the undercard of Black-Eyed Susan day, it is the companion to the James W. Murphy Stakes run on the undercard of Preakness day. Closing this time from midpack, She Feels Pretty made her bid from just after the quarter pole, eventually pulling away to win by 5 3/4 lengths. Following this tuneup, She Feels Pretty competed at the top level for 3 year old turf fillies in the United States, running in the Belmont Oaks, part of the Belmont at the Big A meet in 2024, and the Lake Placid Stakes at Saratoga, winning neither but showing well in both races with in-the-money, losing by less than a length finishes. After these narrow defeats, She Feels Pretty's connections targeted her at the Grade I Queen Elizabeth II Challenge Cup Stakes at Keeneland. Settling well in a stalking position, She Feels Pretty replicated a winning formula, kicking away around the top of the stretch and pulling away to win by 6 lengths. She Feels Pretty would finish her three-year-old campaign not at the Breeders' Cup, as she had at two, but instead on Boxing Day at Santa Anita in the American Oaks. Her usual formula in hand, John Velazquez brought her home 2 1/2 lengths in front of her closest challenger. Her strong campaign at 5:3-0-2 in 2024 would result in her finishing second in the 2024 Eclipse Award voting for American Champion Female Turf Horse.

After her win in the American Oaks, She Feels Pretty was given time off before starting her four year old and 2025 campaign, with her connections foregoing an invitation to compete in the Pegasus World Cup Filly and Mare Turf Invitational in January at Gulfstream Park. Her seasonal debut at 4 would come on Kentucky Oaks day in the Modesty Stakes. Running her usual race, she was clear by 2 1/4 lengths on the wire. For her next two races, She Feels Pretty pointed to Saratoga Race Course in New York, where she ran the New York Stakes on a rainy Acorn Stakes day and the Diana Stakes four weeks later in mid-July, going 1-for-2, with a win in the former and defeat narrowly in the latter. After her narrow defeat in the Diana Stakes at Saratoga, She Feels Pretty returned to Woodbine for another Breeders' Cup Win And You're In Series race, this time for the Breeders' Cup Filly and Mare Turf. Overcoming trouble midway through the race, She Feels Pretty held off a Great Britain-bred filly to win the E.P. Taylor Stakes, her second Grade 1 race win of the season and her fifth overall.

Following the E.P. Taylor Stakes, her connections gave her a break between races, with the next target set for her being the Breeders' Cup Filly and Mare Turf at Del Mar. During that time, she participated in an interview with her trainer, Cherie DeVaux, and Bloodhorse's Anna Curlin, in which it was revealed that she had a traveling companion miniature goat named Mickey, who had been with her through her sophomore and four year old campaigns. Said campaign ended days after the interview in the Breeders' Cup Filly and Mare Turf, where She Feels Pretty was not favored at post time for the first time since her second start in the Natalma Stakes, this time to Cinderella's Dream who had beaten her at age 3 in the Belmont Oaks Invitational Stakes. Losing steam in the straight after her signature top of the stretch move for the lead, She Feels Pretty gave way to the French-bred Gezora, losing the Breeders' Cup Filly and Mare Turf race by 1/2 length.

After her runner-up effort in the Breeders' Cup Filly and Mare Turf, there was initially speculation about whether She Feels Pretty would return at age 5. In the interim, She Feels Pretty's four year old campaign was honored at the Eclipse Awards, as her campaign netted her the 2025 Eclipse Award for American Champion Female Turf Horse. At the ceremony, her connections indicated that she was expected back in 2026 with an eye towards another tilt at a Breeders' Cup Filly and Mare Turf. However, on March 30, 2026, her trainer, Cherie DeVaux announced that she would not return to the races in 2026 following an undisclosed condition that took longer to heal than expected. In a tribute post to She Feels Pretty on X on the occasion of her retirement, Cherie DeVaux said, "She Feels Pretty has left an undeniable mark on my career. She elevated our entire program, brought unforgettable moments, and reminded me why we do this every day. I will always be proud to have been a part of her story." As of March 30, 2026, plans for breeding for She Feels Pretty had not been arranged.

== Statistics ==
Date	Age	Distance	Race	Grade	Track	Odds	Field	Finish	Time	Margin	Jockey	Ref
Jul 16, 2023	2	5 1/2 furlongs	Maiden Special Weight		Ellis Park	6.06	11	1	1:02.81	Neck	Corey Lanerie	
Sep 16, 2023	2	1 mile	Natalma Stakes	1	Woodbine	8.00	13	1	1:35.34	4 1/4 lengths	John Velazquez	
Nov 3, 2023	2	1 mile	Breeders' Cup Juvenile Fillies Turf	1	Santa Anita	3.50*	14	3	1:34.52	(1/2 length)	John Velazquez	
May 16, 2024	3	1 mile	Hilltop Stakes		Pimlico	0.60*	7	1	1:38.59	5 3/4 lengths	John Velazquez	
Jul 6, 2024	3	1 3/16 miles	Belmont Oaks	1	Aqueduct	0.95*	9	3	1:53.57	(3/4 length)	John Velazquez	
Aug 17, 2024	3	1 1/16 miles	Lake Placid Stakes	2	Saratoga	0.95*	9	3	1:43.79	(neck)	John Velazquez	
Oct 12, 2024	3	1 1/16 miles	Queen Elizabeth II Challenge Cup Stakes	1	Keeneland	1.54*	10	1	1:46.50	6 lengths	John Velazquez	
Dec 26, 2024	3	1 1/4 miles	American Oaks	1	Santa Anita	0.60*	11	1	1:58.69	2 1/2 lengths	John Velazquez	
May 2, 2025	4	1 1/8 miles	Modesty Stakes	3	Churchill Downs	0.79*	6	1	1:45.51†	2 1/4 lengths	John Velazquez	
Jun 6, 2025	4	1 3/16 miles	New York Stakes	1	Saratoga	0.50*	7	1	2:00.76	1/2 lengths	John Velazquez	
Jul 12, 2025	4	1 1/8 miles	Diana Stakes	1	Saratoga	0.70*	5	2	1:47.39	(head)	John Velazquez	
Aug 16, 2025	4	1 1/4 miles	E.P. Taylor Stakes	1	Woodbine	0.45*	7	1	2:00.80	head	John Velazquez	
Nov 1, 2025	4	1 3/8 miles	Breeders' Cup Filly and Mare Turf	1	Del Mar	3.10	13	2	2:12.62	(1/2 length)	John Velazquez	

Notes:

- An (*) asterisk after the odds means She Feels Pretty was the post-time favorite.
- A (†) bolded cross after the time means She Feels Pretty set a new stakes record or track time record for the distance.

== Pedigree ==
Pedigree of She Feels Pretty (USA) chestnut 2021
Sire Karakontie (JPN) 2011	Bernstein (USA); 1997	Storm Cat	Storm Bird (CAN)
Sire Karakontie (JPN) 2011	Bernstein (USA); 1997	Storm Cat	Terlingua
Sire Karakontie (JPN) 2011	Bernstein (USA); 1997	La Affirmed	Affirmed
Sire Karakontie (JPN) 2011	Bernstein (USA); 1997	La Affirmed	La Mesa
Sire Karakontie (JPN) 2011	Sun Is Up (JPN); 1998	Sunday Silence	Halo*
Sire Karakontie (JPN) 2011	Sun Is Up (JPN); 1998	Sunday Silence	Wishing Well
Sire Karakontie (JPN) 2011	Sun Is Up (JPN); 1998	Moon Is Up	Woodman*
Sire Karakontie (JPN) 2011	Sun Is Up (JPN); 1998	Moon Is Up	Mesque
Dam Summer Sweet (USA) 2014	More Than Ready (USA); 1997	Southern Halo	Halo*
Dam Summer Sweet (USA) 2014	More Than Ready (USA); 1997	Southern Halo	Northern Sea
Dam Summer Sweet (USA) 2014	More Than Ready (USA); 1997	Woodman's Girl	Woodman*
Dam Summer Sweet (USA) 2014	More Than Ready (USA); 1997	Woodman's Girl	Becky Be Good
Dam Summer Sweet (USA) 2014	Summer Solstice (IRE); 1997	Caerleon	Nijinsky (CAN)
Dam Summer Sweet (USA) 2014	Summer Solstice (IRE); 1997	Caerleon	Foreseer
Dam Summer Sweet (USA) 2014	Summer Solstice (IRE); 1997	Summer Sonnet (GB)	Bailamont
Dam Summer Sweet (USA) 2014	Summer Solstice (IRE); 1997	Summer Sonnet (GB)	Noises (IRE)

She Feels Pretty is inbred 4S x 4D to both Halo and Woodman, meaning that both appear once in the fourth generation on the sire side (via Sun Is Up) and once in the fourth generation on the dam's side (via More Than Ready).
