= Maryland Million Lassie =

- Class: Restricted State-bred Stakes
- Location: Laurel Park Racecourse, Laurel, Maryland, United States
- Inaugurated: 1986
- Race type: Thoroughbred - Flat racing
- Website: www.marylandthoroughbred.com/newsindex.php?articleid=953

Race information
- Distance: (7 furlongs)
- Surface: Dirt
- Track: left-handed
- Qualification: Two-year-old fillies
- Purse: $101,000 (2009)

Maryland Million Lassie is an American Thoroughbred horse race held annually in October since 1986 primarily at Laurel Park Racecourse in Laurel, Maryland or at Pimlico Race Course in Baltimore. To be eligible for the Maryland Million Nursery, a horse must be sired by a stallion who stands in Maryland. Due to that restriction the race is classified as a non-graded or "listed" stakes race and is not eligible for grading by the American Graded Stakes Committee.

The race is part of Maryland Million Day, a 12-race program held in mid October that was the creation of renowned television sports journalist Jim McKay. The "Maryland Million" is the first State-Bred showcase event ever created. Since 1986, 27 other events in 20 states have imitated the showcase and its structure.

At its inception in 1986 the race was run at one mile. In 1987 and 1989 through 1992, 2001, 2002, and 2004 the race was run at 6 furlongs. In addition to the prize money, the winning owner receives a Maryland Million Waterford Crystal bowl.

In its 30th running in 2015, the race was restricted to those horses who were sired by a stallion who stands in the state of Maryland. Both the entrant horse and their stallion had to be nominated to the Maryland Million program.

== Records ==
Speed record:

- 6 furlongs : 1:11.04 - Jonesin for Jerry (2013)
- 7 furlongs : 1:23.80 - Prospector's Fuel (1994)

Most wins by an owner:

- 2 - Hal C. B. Clagett (1990, 1992)
- 2 - R. Larry Johnson (2010, 2014)

Most wins by a jockey:

- 3 - Ramon Dominguez (2000, 2001, 2003, 2005)
- 3 - Julian Pimentel (2006, 2010, 2014)

Most wins by a trainer:

- 3 - Michael J. Trombetta (2006, 2010, 2014)
- 3 - Jerry Robb (1990, 1992, 2013)

== Winners ==
Yr	Winner	Age	Jockey	Trainer	Owner	Dist.	Time	Purse
2020		2				6 fur.	0:00.00	$100,000
2019	Hello Beautiful	2	Sheldon Russell	Brittany Russell	Madaket Stables	6 fur.	1:10.33	$100,000
2018	My Star Potential	2	Jomar Torres	Claudio A. Gonzalez	Euro Stable	6 fur.	1:11.73	$100,000
2017	Limited View	2	Edgar Prado	John Salzman, Jr.	John Salzman, Jr.	6 fur.	1:12.15	$100,000
2016	Item	2	Tyler Conner	Rodrigo Madrigal, Sr.	Tom Coulter	6 fur.	1:12.45	$100,000
2015	Lexington Street	2	Jevian Toledo	Gary Capuano	Marathon Farms	6 fur.	1:11.13	$100,000
2014	My Magician	2	Julian Pimentel	Michael J. Trombetta	R. Larry Johnson	6 fur.	1:12.11	$100,000
2013	Jonesin for Jerry	2	Abel Castellano, Jr.	Jerry Robb	Hidden Hill Farm	6 fur.	1:11.04	$100,000
2012	Classy Coco	2	Matthew Rispoli	T. Bernard Houghton	Michael R. Cox	6 fur.	1:13.34	$100,000
2011	Bluegrass Atatude	2	Jorge F. Chavez	John E. Salzman Jr.	All the Above Racing	6 fur.	1:12.45	$100,000
2010	Doing Great	2	Julian Pimentel	Michael J. Trombetta	R. Larry Johnson	7 fur.	1:12.06	$100,000
2009	Lil Liara	2	Carlos Marquez Jr.	Cathal Lynch	Smith & Kokomo Stable	7 fur.	1:11.82	$100,000
2008	Miss Charm City	2	H. A. Karamanos	Carlos A. Garcia	James Glenn	7 fur.	1:26.11	$150,000
2007	Love for Not	2	Stewart Elliott	Kevin G. Sleeter	Golden Dome Stables	7 fur.	1:26.11	$125,000
2006	Spectacular Malibu	2	Julian Pimentel	Michael J. Trombetta	Country Life Farm	7 fur.	1:25.30	$125,000
2005	Smart and Fancy	2	Ramon A. Dominguez	Anthony W. Dutrow	Win and Place Stable	7 fur.	1:25.98	$100,000
2004	Hear Us Roar	2	L. Garcia	Francis P. Campitelli	Rosalee C. Davidson	6 fur.	1:11.61	$100,000
2003	Richetta	2	Ramon A. Dominguez	Robin L. Graham	Elk Manor Farm	7 fur.	1:24.33	$100,000
2002	Object of Virtue	2	Craig Perret	Gregory D. Foley	Leslie D. Linkenhoker	6 fur.	1:13.72	$100,000
2001	Night Breeze	2	Ramon A. Dominguez	H. Graham Motion	Lazy Lane Farms, Inc.	6 fur.	1:11.85	$100,000
2000	Your Out	2	Ramon A. Dominguez	H. Graham Motion	Eugene F. Ford	7 fur.	1:24.11	$100,000
1999	Gin Talking	2	Mark T. Johnston	Hamilton A. Smiyh	Skeedattle Associates	7 fur.	1:24.80	$100,000
1998	Perfect Challenge	2	C. Omar Clinger	Linda Albert	3-B Stables	7 fur.	1:26.20	$100,000
1997	Maragold Princess	2	Edgar S. Prado	Todd A. Pletcher	Michael Cascio	7 fur.	1:26.80	$100,000
1996	Lovely Tasha	2	Rick Wilson	Benjamin W. Perkins Jr.	New Farm & M.Boskin	7 fur.	1:24.80	$100,000
1995	Mystic Rhythms	2	Joe Bravo	John F. Dowd	Just for Fun Stable	7 fur.	1:24.40	$100,000
1994	Prospector's Fuel	2	Mario Pino	William Donovan	Colossal Stable	7 fur.	1:23.80	$100,000
1993	Lady Beaumont	2	F. Castillo	Ronald Alfano	Mrs. J. W. Y. Martin, Jr.	7 fur.	1:25.20	$100,000
1992	Carnirainbow	2	Greg W. Hutton	Jerry Robb	Hal C. B. Clagett	6 fur.	1:12.60	$100,000
1991	Missy White Oak	2	Julie Krone	Charles J. Hadry	Meeting House Farm	6 fur.	1:12.60	$100,000
1990	Ameri Allen	2	A. Delgado	Jerry Robb	Hal C. B. Clagett	6 fur.	1:13.40	$100,000
1989	She's a Champ	2	Mike Luzzi	Harold A. Allen	Search's Haven	6 fur.	1:11.80	$100,000
1988	Ms. Gold Pole	2	Julie Krone	John H. Forbes	R. J. Trancone	7 fur.	1:24.00	$100,000
1987	Thirty Eight Go Go	2	Chris McCarron	King T. Leatherbury	K. T. Leatherbury, Inc.	6 fur.	1:12.60	$100,000
1986	Smart Halo	2	Don Seymour	James E. Day	Sam-Son Farm	1 mile	1:39.60	$100,000

== See also ==
- Maryland Million Lassie top three finishers
- Maryland Million Day
- Laurel Park Racecourse
