= L'Attrayante =

French-bred Thoroughbred racehorse

- Sire: Tyrant
- Grandsire: Bold Ruler
- Dam: Camerata
- Damsire: Klairon
- Sex: Mare
- Foaled: 8 March 1980
- Country: France
- Colour: Brown
- Breeder: BBA (Ireland)
- Owner: Mrs Charles Thériot; Allen Paulson
- Trainer: Olivier Douieb; Ron McAnally
- Record: 36: 8-12-7
- Earnings: $935,969

Major wins
- Prix des Yearlings (1982); Poule d'Essai des Pouliches (1983); Irish 1000 Guineas (1983); E. P. Taylor Stakes (1983); Countess Fager Handicap (1985)

Awards
- Timeform rating 112 (1982), 123 (1983)

L'Attrayante (8 March 1980 – after 1994) was a French Thoroughbred racehorse and broodmare. She was the first, and remains (as of 2018), the only horse to win both the Poule d'Essai des Pouliches and the Irish 1000 Guineas. As a two-year-old she showed very promising form, winning her first two races and later being placed in both the Prix du Calvados and the Prix Marcel Boussac. In the following spring she reached her peak, taking the Poule d'Essai des Pouliches on 1 May and the Irish 1000 Guineas three weeks later.

She was moved to North America later in 1983 and won the E. P. Taylor Stakes in Canada. She continued to compete in the United States for three more seasons and won three more races including the Grade III Countess Fager Handicap as well as being placed in several major events.

After the end of her track career she became a broodmare and had considerable success as a dam of winners.

== Background ==
L'Attrayante was a brown mare with no white markings bred in France by the bloodstock agency BBA (Ireland). As a yearling she was put up for auction and sold for 130,000 francs (approximately £12,000). She entered the ownership of Mrs Charles Thériot and was sent into training with Olivier Douieb.

She was sired by the Kentucky-bred Tyrant who won the Carter Handicap in 1970 and later stood as a breeding stallion in the United States, Ireland and France. His other foals included Bold Run (Premio Emilio Turati), Sutton Place (Child Stakes) and Trevita (Flower Bowl Invitational Handicap). Her dam Camerata, who was 21 years old when L'Attrayante was foaled, produced several other winners including Campo Moro the winner of the Prix Gladiateur. She was a great-granddaughter of the French mare Armoise (foaled 1930) whose other descendants included Cobalt (Poule d'Essai des Poulains), Le Haar (sire of Exbury and Five Hope (Yushun Himba).

== Racing career ==
=== 1982: two-year-old season ===
L'Attrayante began her racing career in July when she won over 1100 metres at Évry Racecourse. In her next three races she ran at Deauville Racecourse, starting with a half length success in the Prix des Yearlings over 1500 metres in August. She then finished second to Tarte Chaude in the Prix de l'Agence Français and third behind Maximova and Soigneuse in the Prix du Calvados. On her final appearance of the season L'Attrayante was stepped up to Group One level for the Prix Marcel Boussac over 1600 metres at Longchamp Racecourse on 3 October. Starting a 31/1 outsider she recovered from being hampered in the straight to finished fourth behind the British challenger Goodbye Shelley, Mysterieuse Etoile and Maximova. Her jockey Alain Lequeux lodged and objection to Maximova for causing interference and after a stewards' inquiry she was promoted to third.

=== 1983: three-year-old season ===
On her three-year-old debut L'Attrayante contested the Prix de la Grotte over 1600 metres on very soft ground) at Longchamp in April and finished third of the eleven runners behind Mysterieuse Etoile and Take A Step. Over the same course and distance on 1 May she was one of nine runners for the Poule d'Essai des Poulains in which she was ridden by Alain Badel. Mysterieuse Etoile and Goodbye Shelley were made joint favourites ahead of Maximova and Take A Step with L'Attrayante next in the betting on 12/1. After being restrained by Badel in the early stages she move up to challenge the leaders in the straight, went to the front 100 metres from the finish and prevailed by half a length from Mysterieuse Etoile with Maximova finishing strongly to take third ahead of Chamisene and Little Meadow.

Three weeks later, with Badel again in the saddle, started 4/1 favourite in an 18-runner field for the Irish 1000 Guineas on heavy ground at the Curragh. The other fancied runners included Flame of Tara (Athasi Stakes), Goodbye Shelley, Habibti and Maximova. L'Attrayannte looked to be traveling well throughout the race, went to the front approaching the final quarter mile and never looked in danger of defeat, winning by one and a half lengths from Maximova. The British challenger Annie Edge took third ahead of the first of the Irish fillies Flame of Tara.

L'Attrayante was off the track for over three months before returning in September when she was matched against male opposition and older horses in the Prix du Moulin at Longchamp. She finished fourth of the eight runners, beaten eleven lengths by the winner Luth Enchantee. Following her run in the Moulin it was announced that she had been bought by the American owner and breeder Allen Paulson for $2,000,000. Although Douieb remained her trainer of record, she spent the rest of the season racing in the United States. On her North American debut she was sent to Canada for the E. P. Taylor Stakes at Woodbine Racetrack and won by one and a half lengths from If Winter Comes. In the Yellow Ribbon Invitational Stakes at Santa Anita Park on 6 November she finished second to the five-year-old mare Sangue, with Royal Heroine, Luth Enchantee and Flame of Tara among the unplaced runners. On her final appearance of the season she finished fifth to Sangue in the Matriarch Stakes at Hollywood Park Racetrack.

=== North American racing career ===
From 1984 onwards L'Attrayante was relocated to the United States where she was trained by Ron McAnally. In 1984 she failed to win in eight races but ran consistently in several major distaff contests and earned $128,025. She finished second in the Santa Barbara Handicap and Palomar Handicap and third in the San Gorgonio Handicap and Santa Ana Handicap.

In 1985 L'Attrayante finished second in ah allowance race at Santa Anita Park and fifth in the Santa Ana Handicap before moving to Golden Gate Fields for four races. She finished second in the Merry Madeline Handicap and then recorded her first win in over 18 months when she took the Golden Poppy Handicap on 27 April. She ran third to Salt Spring in the Grade III Yerba Buena Handicap three weeks later and then won the Countess Fager Handicap on 16 June. She failed to win in seven subsequent starts that season but finished second in the Palomar Handicap, Hillsborough Stakes and Las Palmas Handicap and third in the Beverly Hills Handicap.

L'Attrayante began her final season by running second in the Cecelia de Mille Harper Handicap at Bay Meadows in January and then finished second in an allowance at Santa Anita in the following month. She ended her racing career with a victory as she returned to Golden Gate Fields on 5 April and took the Merry Madeleine Handicap.

== Assessment ==
In the classification of French two-year-olds for 1982, L'Attrayante was assigned a weight of 126 pounds, seven pounds behind the top-rated filly Ma Biche. The independent Timeform organisation gave her a rating of 112, making her 11 pounds inferior to Ma Biche who was rated their best two-year-old filly. In the official International Classification for 1983, she was rated the seventh-best three-year-old filly in Europe, nine pounds behind the sprinter Habibti. Timeform rated her on 123, thirteen pounds behind Habibti, who was their Horse of the Year. In their annual annual Racehorse of 1983 Timeform described her as "thoroughly genuine and consistent".

== Breeding record ==
At the end of her racing career L'Attrayante was retired to become a broodmare for her owner's stud. She produced seven foals and five winners between 1987 and 1994:

- Ozal, a chestnut colt, foaled in 1987, sired by Lyphard. Won two races; placed at Group Two level.
- Yendaka, bay colt, 1988, by Seattle Slew. Won two races.
- Miss Lenora, bay filly, 1989, by Theatrical. Won five races including Bewitch Stakes.
- Madeleine's Dream, dark bay or brown filly, 1990, by Theatrical. Won two races including Poule d'Essai des Pouliches.
- Bovari, bay colt (later gelded), 1992, by Nijinsky. Won three races.
- Virgo, colt (gelded), 1993, by Blushing John. Failed to win in three races.
- Kyka, chestnut filly, 1994, by Blushing John. Unraced.

== Pedigree ==
Pedigree of L'Attrayante, brown mare, 1980
Sire Tyrant (USA) 1966	Bold Ruler (USA); 1954	Nasrullah	Nearco
Sire Tyrant (USA) 1966	Bold Ruler (USA); 1954	Nasrullah	Mumtaz Begum
Sire Tyrant (USA) 1966	Bold Ruler (USA); 1954	Miss Disco	Discovery
Sire Tyrant (USA) 1966	Bold Ruler (USA); 1954	Miss Disco	Outdone
Sire Tyrant (USA) 1966	Anadem (IRE); 1954	My Babu	Djebel
Sire Tyrant (USA) 1966	Anadem (IRE); 1954	My Babu	Perfume
Sire Tyrant (USA) 1966	Anadem (IRE); 1954	Anne of Essex	Panorama
Sire Tyrant (USA) 1966	Anadem (IRE); 1954	Anne of Essex	Queen of Essex
Dam Camerata (FR) 1959	Klairon (FR); 1952	Clarion	Djebel
Dam Camerata (FR) 1959	Klairon (FR); 1952	Clarion	Columba
Dam Camerata (FR) 1959	Klairon (FR); 1952	Kalmia	Kantar
Dam Camerata (FR) 1959	Klairon (FR); 1952	Kalmia	Sweet Lavender
Dam Camerata (FR) 1959	Java Sea (FR); 1949	Winterhalter	Gainsborough
Dam Camerata (FR) 1959	Java Sea (FR); 1949	Winterhalter	Perce-Neige
Dam Camerata (FR) 1959	Java Sea (FR); 1949	Argovie	Crapom
Dam Camerata (FR) 1959	Java Sea (FR); 1949	Argovie	Armoise (Family: 20-a)

- L'Attrayante was inbred 4 × 4 to Djebel, meaning that this stallion appears twice in the fourth generation of her pedigree.
