= Maryland Million Lassie top three finishers =

This is a listing of the horses that finished in either first, second, or third place and the number of starters in the Maryland Million Lassie, an American state-bred stakes race for two-year-old fillies at seven furlong on the dirt held at Laurel Park Racecourse in Laurel, Maryland. (List 1986-present)

Year	Winner	Second	Third	Starters
2020				-
2019	Hello Beautiful	Stickingtogether	Worstbestideaever	13
2018	My Star Potential	Belial	Miss Philly Dilly	13
2017	Limited View	Pikachu Princess	Buff's in Love	11
2016	Item	She’s Achance Too	Small Batch	14
2015	Lexington Street	Fly Girl	Table Jumper	9
2014	My Magician	Rocky Policy	Rockin Jojo	13
2013	Jonesin for Jerry	Steady N Love	Pocket Gift	8
2012	Classy Coco	Stormy Adventure	Steely	7
2011	Bluegrass Atatude	Taxi Dancer	Nastar Medallist	14
2010	Doing Great	Twelve Pack Shelly	Love’s Reason	7
2009	Lil Kiara	Ben’s Boots	Jim's Prospect	n/a
2008	Miss Charm City	Fools In Love	Blind Date	n/a
2007	Love for Not	All Attitude	Kosmo's Buddy	n/a
2006	Spectacular Malibu	Expected Pleasures	Paying Off	n/a
2005	Smart and Fancy	Who Was	Swear to It	n/a
2004	Hear Us Roar	Partners Due	Golden Malibu	n/a
2003	Richetta	Grant's Moon	He Loves Me	n/a
2002	Object of Virtue	Rachelle's Numbers	Butitwillflysomeday	n/a
2001	Night Breeze	Bronze Babe	Madame X Ski	n/a
2000	Your Out	Trueytoo	Gigi's Magic	n/a
1999	Gin Talking	Case of the Blues	Shamrock Love	n/a
1998	Perfect Challenge	Timely Irony	Christy's Hero	n/a
1997	Maragold Princess	Expensive Issue	Rammer	n/a
1996	Lovely Tasha	Buckles and Kinks	Big Ego	n/a
1995	Mystic Rhythms	Secret Prospect	Im Out First	n/a
1994	Prospector's Fuel	Fighting Countess	Citirainbow	n/a
1993	Lady Beaumont	Waqueen	Frigid Coed	n/a
1992	Carnirainbow	Buck Roll	Devilish Play	n/a
1991	Missy White Oak	Come On Spring	Glori Halo	n/a
1990	Ameri Allen	Ritchie Trail	Lady Ardis	n/a
1989	She's a Champ	Run Smartly	Am Possible	n/a
1988	Ms. Gold Pole	Safely Kept	Open Mind	n/a
1987	Thirty Eight Go Go	Lady Danger	Say Beautiful	n/a
1986	Smart Halo	In the Curl	Short Fuse Susie	8

== See also ==
- Maryland Million Lassie
- Maryland Million Day
- Laurel Park Racecourse
