= Cherie DeVaux =

American racehorse trainer (born 1981)

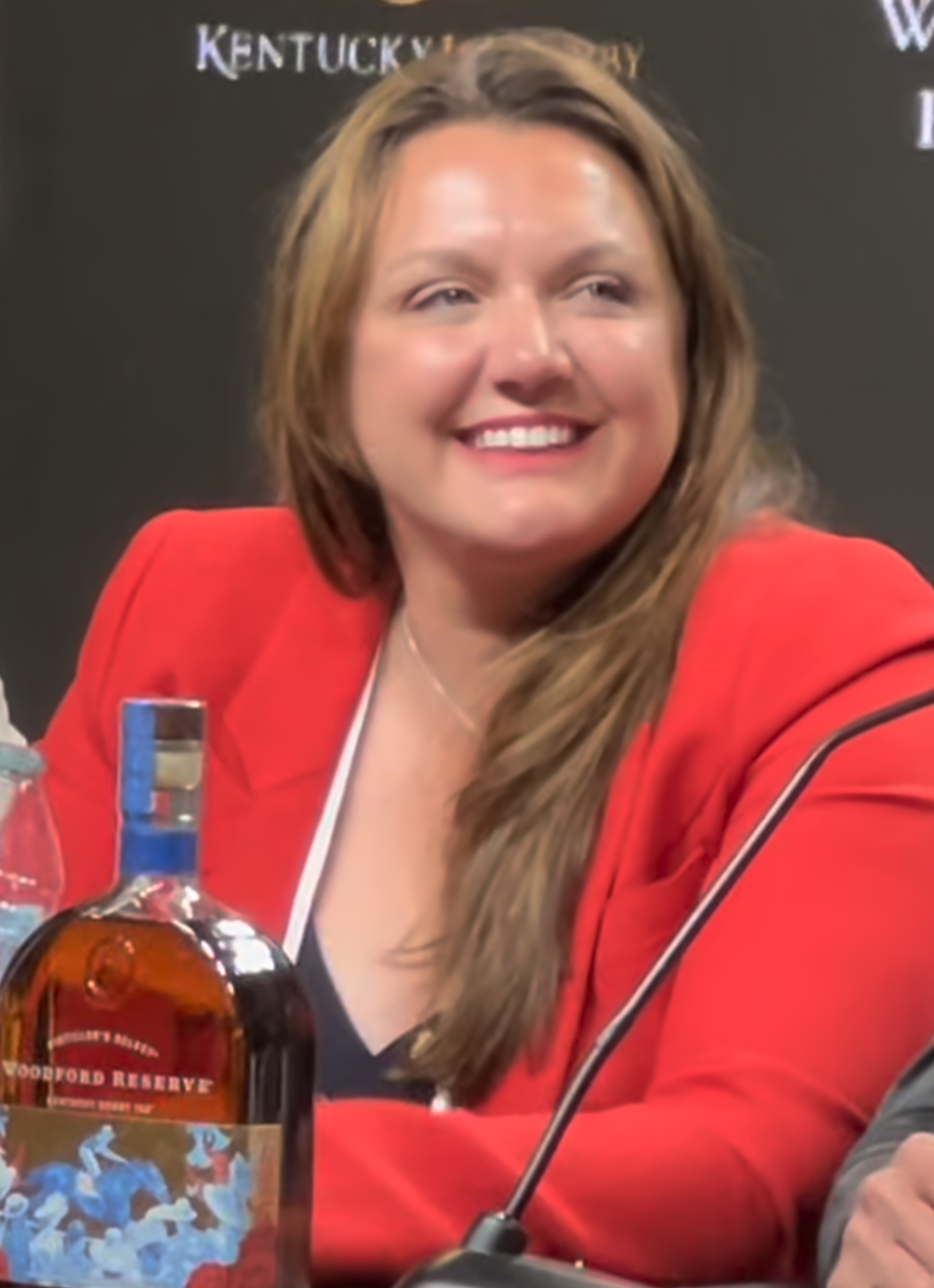
- DeVaux in 2026

Personal information
- Born: December 2, 1981 (age 44) Saratoga Springs, New York, United States
- Occupation: Racehorse trainer
- Spouse: David Ingordo

Horse racing career
- Sport: Horse racing
- Career wins: 297+ (ongoing)

Major racing wins
- Shine Again Stakes (2019); Regret Stakes (2021); Mint Julep Stakes (2022); Charles Town Oaks (2023); Natalma Stakes (2023); Manila Stakes (2023); Molly Pitcher Stakes (2023); Raven Run Stakes (2023); American Oaks (2024); Bryan Station Stakes (2024); Queen Elizabeth II Challenge Cup Stakes (2024); Allaire duPont Stakes (2024); American Derby (2024); Chicago Stakes (2024, 2025); Derby City Distaff Stakes (2024); Fair Grounds Stakes (2024, 2025); Hilltop Stakes (2024); Pimlico Special (2024); Chick Lang Stakes (2025); De La Rose Stakes (2025); E. P. Taylor Stakes (2025); James W. Murphy Stakes (2025); Modesty Stakes (2025); New York Stakes (2025); Wise Dan Stakes (2025); Lecomte Stakes (2026); Transylvania Stakes (2026); Woody Stephens Stakes (2026); H. Allen Jerkens Memorial Stakes (2026) American Classics wins: Kentucky Derby (2026); Belmont Stakes (2026) Breeders' Cup wins: Breeders' Cup Mile (2024)

Significant horses
- More Than Looks, Vahva, She Feels Pretty, Golden Tempo, Englishman

Cherie DeVaux (born December 2, 1981) is an American thoroughbred racehorse trainer. In 2026, she won the Kentucky Derby and the Belmont Stakes as the trainer of Golden Tempo, becoming the first woman to train a Derby winner and the second to train a Belmont winner, after Jena Antonucci.

== Early life ==
DeVaux was born to Janet and Adrian DeVaux in Saratoga Springs, New York. The family moved when she was young to Englewood, Florida. She has nine siblings (seven brothers and two sisters). Her father and several siblings are also involved in the horse world, training horses for flat and harness racing. She attended Lemon Bay High School and Florida Gulf Coast University. She also rode horses and competed in barrel racing.

== Career ==
DeVaux in her early years worked as an assistant trainer for Chuck Simon and Chad Brown.

DeVaux started her horse training business in 2018 with eight horses. She won her first race on her 29th start. She trained several horses for Breeders' Cup races in 2021, 2023, and 2024, winning the 2024 Breeders' Cup Mile as the trainer of More Than Looks.

She also trained She Feels Pretty to 2025 American National Champion Female Turf Horse honors, the first for herself and for owners Roy and Gretchen Jackson. During her racing career, She Feels Pretty has won multiple Grade 1 races including the Natalma Stakes at 2, Queen Elizabeth II Challenge Cup at 3 and the E.P. Taylor Stakes at 4.

On May 2, 2026, DeVaux became the first woman trainer to win the Kentucky Derby when her horse, Golden Tempo, closed from last to win. She later won the 2026 Belmont Stakes, again as the trainer of Golden Tempo, who came from behind to earn a second Triple Crown win in 2026. She is the second woman trainer to win the Belmont.
