= Skipat Stakes =

- Class: Listed
- Location: Pimlico Race Course, Baltimore, Maryland, United States
- Inaugurated: 1993
- Race type: Thoroughbred - Flat racing
- Website: www.pimlico.com

Race information
- Distance: 6 furlongs
- Surface: Dirt
- Track: Left-handed
- Qualification: Three-year-olds & up; fillies & mares
- Weight: Assigned
- Purse: $75,000

The Skipat Stakes is an American Thoroughbred horse race held annually at Pimlico Race Course in Baltimore, Maryland. Contested over a distance of six furlongs on the dirt, it is open to fillies and mares three-years-old and up.

The race is during the latter part of April/early May and was named in honor of Skipat, a rangy, 17.1-hand chestnut daughter of Jungle Cove. She won 27 races from 45 starts over six years, earning $614,215 in her career. In 1979 and 1981, she won the grade two Barbara Fritchie Handicap. Her second victory in the Fritchie came after she had been retired, bred and foaled. In August 1989, she was struck by lightning and killed in her stall. Her foal (Skilaunch) was standing next to her, survived, and went on to produce five stakes winners from five foals.

The Skipat Stakes is the lead off leg of the Mid Atlantic Thoroughbred Championships Fillies and Mare Sprint Dirt Division or MATCh Races. MATCh is a series of five races in five separate thoroughbred divisions run throughout four Mid-Atlantic States including; Pimlico Race Course and Laurel Park Racecourse in Maryland; Delaware Park Racetrack in Delaware; Parx, Philadelphia Park and Presque Isle Downs in Pennsylvania and Monmouth Park in New Jersey.

== Records ==
Speed record:

- 6 furlongs - 1:09.80 - Weather Vane (1998) & Big Bambu (2001)
- 6.5 furlongs - 1:16.40 - Cherokee Wonder (1996) & Smart 'n Noble (1995)

Most wins by a jockey:

- 3 - Mario Pino (1995, 1998 & 2001)

Most wins by a trainer:

- 2 - Richard W. Delp (1995 & 1998)
- 2 - Michael E. Gorham (2000 & 2006)
- 2 - Timothy F. Ritchey (2002 & 2008)

== Winners of the Skipat Stakes ==
Year	Winner	Age	Jockey	Trainer	Owner	Dist. (furlongs)	Time	Purse
2026	Striker Has Dial	5	Ricardo Santana Jr.	Horacio De Paz	Chief Horse Futures, LLC	6 fur.	1:10.44	$100,000
2025	Zeitlos	5	José Ortiz	Steven M. Asmussen	Stonestreet Stables & Peter Leidel	6 fur.	1:11.20	$100,000
2024	Apple Picker	4	Sheldon Russell	Brittany T. Russell	Michael Dubb	6 fur.	1:12.34	$100,000
2023	Cheetara (CHI)	6	Vincent Cheminaud	Ignacio Correas IV	Stud Los Leones	6 fur.	1:09.95	$100,000
2022	Joy's Rocket	4	Joel Rosario	Steve Asmussen	Team Hanley & Parkland Thoroughbreds	6 fur.	1:09.76	$100,000
2021	Chub Wagon	4	Irad Ortiz, Jr.	Guadalupe Preciado	Daniel J. Lopez	6 fur.	1:09.71	$100,000
2020	Never Enough Time	4	Julian Pimentel	Michael J. Trombetta	Larry Johnson	6 fur.	1:10.42	$100,000
2019	Chalon	5	Javier Castellano	Arnaud Delacour	Lael Stables	6 fur.	1:09.46	$100,000
2018	Vertical Oak	5	Ricardo Santana Jr.	Steve Asmussen	J. Kirk Robison	6 fur.	1:10.35	$100,000
2017	Clipthecouponannie	4	John R. Velazquez	Todd Pletcher	Repole Stable	6 fur.	1:10.93	$100,000
2016	Disco Chick	5	Trevor McCarthy	Mario Serey	Freedom Acres	6 fur.	1:10.33	$100,000
2015	Galiana	5	Abel Lezcano	Rodolfo Romero	Triple R Stable	6 fur.	0:00.00	$100,000
2014	Lion D N A	5	Joel Rosario	Rudy Rodriguez	Bethlehem Stables	6 fur.	1:11.09	$100,000
2013	Dance to Bristol	4	Ollie Figgins, III	Xavier Perez	Copperville Farm	6 fur.	1:11.86	$100,000
2012	Bold Affair	4	Abel Castellano	Howard Wolfendale	Mike Zanella & Charles Reed	6 fur.	1:11.71	$100,000
2011	Race not held							
2010	Lights Off Annie	5	Rajiv Maragh	Michael E. Hushion	Repole Stable	6 fur.	1:10.33	$70,000
2009	All Giving	5	Jonathan Joyce	Flint Stites	Concepts Unlimited Stables	6 fur.	1:10.70	$56,560
2008	Akronism	4	Pablo Morales	Timothy F. Ritchey	Robert S. Evans	6 fur.	1:09.76	$75,000
2007	Silmaril	6	Ryan Fogelsonger	Christopher W. Grove	Stephen E. Quick	6 fur.	1:10.80	$100,000
2006	Trickle of Gold	4	Alex O. Beitia	Michael E. Gorham	John D. Murphy	6 fur.	1:11.20	$75,000
2005	Spring Rush	5	Steve Hamilton	Mark Shuman	Michael J. Gill	6 fur.	1:10.20	$75,000
2004	Love You Madly	4	Jozbin Santana	Michael J. Trombetta	Dixiana Farms	6 fur.	1:11.40	$50,000
2003	Bronze Abe	4	Erick Rodriguez	Grover G. Delp	Samuel Bayard	6 fur.	1:10.80	$75,000
2002	Madame Roar	4	Jeremy Rose	Timothy F. Ritchey	Hidden Point Farm, Inc.	6 fur.	1:11.20	$50,000
2001	Big Bambu	4	Mario Pino	Alan Sobol	Edward E. Marshal & John Schoonover	6 fur.	1:09.80	$75,000
2000	Lily's Affair	4	Harry Vega	Michael E. Gorham	Stronach Stable	6 fur.	1:11.00	$75,000
1999	Crab Grass	5	Rick Wilson	Barclay Tagg	William M. Backer	6 fur.	1:12.20	$75,000
1998	Weather Vane	4	Mario Pino	Richard W. Delp	Par Four Racing Stable	6 fur.	1:09.80	$80,000
1997	Conradley	5	Edgar Prado	Ronald Cartwright	Mea Culpa Stables	6 fur.	1:10.20	$80,000
1996	Cherokee Wonder	5	Mark T. Johnston	Gary Capuano	ZWP Stables	6.5 fur.	1:16.40	$55,000
1995	Smart 'n Noble	4	Mario Pino	Richard W. Delp	Robert L. Scruggs Jr.	6.5 fur.	1:16.40	$200,000
1994	Wild Lady A.	4	Jeff Lloyd	Floyd W. Snyder	Katherine Koontz	6.5 fur.	1:18.60	$35,000
1993	Tripp Trial	4	William Moorefield	Francis P. Campitelli	Chris Huber & Ron Slyder	7 fur.	1:26.00	$35,000

== See also ==
- Skipat Stakes top three finishers and starters
- Pimlico Race Course
- List of graded stakes at Pimlico Race Course
