= The Very One Stakes (Pimlico) =

- Class: Ungraded
- Location: Pimlico Race Course, Baltimore, Maryland, United States
- Inaugurated: 1993
- Race type: Thoroughbred - Flat racing
- Website: www.pimlico.com

Race information
- Distance: 5 furlongs
- Surface: Turf
- Track: Left-handed
- Qualification: Three-year-olds & up; fillies & mares
- Weight: Base weights with allowances: 4-year-olds and up: 124 lbs. 3-year-olds: 118 lbs.
- Purse: $100,000

The Very One Stakes is an American Thoroughbred horse race run annually at Pimlico Race Course in Baltimore, Maryland. Open to fillies and mares three years old and up, it is contested over a distance of five furlongs on turf.

The Very One Stakes is run on the third Friday of May each year on the Black-Eyed Susan Stakes under card. The race is run on the "Filly Friday" of Preakness Stakes weekend. The race was not run between 1994 and 2000. The first year the race was run in 1993, it was contested at 1 1/16 miles on the main track at "Old Hilltop" on a dirt surface; since that time it has been run at a distance of five furlongs and on the turf.

The Very One Stakes attracts female turf sprinters. It was named in honor of The Very One, one of the best race mares in training during the late 1970s and early 1980s. Purchased out of the 1977 two-year-old in training sale at Timonium for $22,000, she became a millionaire, racing in 71 times with a record of 22 wins, 12 second-place finishes and 18 third-place finishes and earnings of $1,030,120. Her most famous wins came in the grade one Santa Barbara Handicap in California and the grade two Dixie Stakes at Pimlico Race Course in Baltimore, Maryland, over the best turf males in the country in 1979.

The Very One Stakes is the lead off leg of the Mid Atlantic Thoroughbred Championships Fillies and Mares Sprint Turf Division or MATCh Races. MATCh is a series of five races in five separate thoroughbred divisions run throughout four Mid-Atlantic States including; Pimlico Race Course and Laurel Park Racecourse in Maryland; Delaware Park Racetrack in Delaware; Parx, Philadelphia Park and Presque Isle Downs in Pennsylvania and Monmouth Park in New Jersey.

== Records ==
Speed record:

- 5 furlongs - 55.60 - Unbridled Sidney (2007)

Most wins by a jockey:

- 2 - Ramon Dominguez (2001 & 2002)
- 2 - Edgar Prado (1993 & 2005)
- 2 - Javier Castellano (2006, 2017)

Most wins by a trainer:

- 3 - Kathleen DeMasi (2002, 2004, 2017)

Most wins by an owner:

- 2 - Darley Stables (2003 & 2009)

== Winners of The Very One Stakes since 1993 ==
Year	Winner	Age	Jockey	Trainer	Owner	Dist.	Time	Purse
2026	Sunna	4	Luis Saez	J. Kent Sweezey	Leverett S. Miller	5 fur.	1:01.04	$100,000
2025	Bosserati	5	Irad Ortiz Jr.	Brittany T. Russell	Joel Politi	5 fur.	59.44	$100,000
2024	Future Is Now	4	Paco Lopez	Michael J. Trombetta	R. Larry Johnson	5 fur.	58.29	$100,000
2023	Train To Artemus	5	Paco Lopez	Kelly Breen	M and W Stables	5 fur.	55.81	$100,000
2022	Can The Queen	6	Victor R. Carrasco	Rodolfo Sanchez-Salomon	Joanne Shankle	5 fur.	59.09	$100,000
2021	Caravel	4	Florent Geroux	Elizabeth M. Merryman	Elizabeth M. Merryman	5 fur.	56.21	$100,000
2020	A Great Time	4	Julian Pimentel	Michael J. Trombetta	Larry Johnson	5 fur.	1:00.14	$100,000
2019	Wild About Star	5	Daniel Centeno	Jose M. Camejo	Brittlyn Stable, Inc.	5 fur.	56.93	$100,000
2018	Girl Knows Best	4	Javier Castellano	Eddie Kenneally	Brian Chenvert	5 fur.	55.66	$100,000
2017	Everything Lovely	4	Javier Castellano	Kathleen DeMasi	Pewter Stable	5 fur.	57.93	$100,000
2016	Lady Shipman	4	Joel Rosario	Kiaran P. McLaughlin	Ranlo Investments	5 fur.	57.85	$100,000
2015	Ageless	6	Julien Leparoux	Arnaud Delacour	Lael Stables	5 fur.	55.66	$100,000
2014	Ageless	5	Luis Garcia	Arnaud Delacour	Lael Stables	5 fur.	58.91	$100,000
2013	Sensible Lady	3	Angel Serpa	Timothy Salzman	Three Lyons Racing	5 fur.	56.57	$100,000
2012	Sensible Lady	3	Xavier Perez	Timothy Salzman	Three Lyons Racing	5 fur.	56.13	$100,000
2011	Suzzona	7	Julian Pimentel	Benjamin Feliciano	Sandy Valley Farms	5 fur.	1:00.41	$75,000
2010	Starfish Bay	4	John Velazquez	Todd Pletcher	Gainesway Stable	5 fur.	56.56	$70,000
2009	Criticism	5	Edgar Prado	Thomas Albertrani	Darley Stables	5 fur.	56.00	$75,000
2008	All Giving	4	Erick Rodriguez	Flint Stites	Catherine J. Smith	5 fur.	57.46	$75,000
2007	Unbridled Sidney	6	Calvin Borel	Ronny Werner	Norrine & Doug Devenport	5 fur.	55.60	$75,000
2006	Gilded Gold	5	Javier Castellano	Alan E. Goldberg	Bobby Flay & Rob. Masterson	5 fur.	57.20	$75,000
2005	Gabianna	5	Horacio Karamanos	Jorge Prado	Andre and Lenard Vaughn	5 fur.	59.60	$75,000
2004	Go Go Baby Go	5	Ryan Fogelsonger	Kathleen DeMasi	Joseph Boff & C. Burke	5 fur.	56.00	$75,000
2003	Forest Heiress	4	Pat Day	William I. Mott	Darley Stables	5 fur.	57.60	$75,000
2002	Merry Princess	6	Ramon Dominguez	Kathleen DeMasi	Pewter Stable	5 fur.	56.60	$50,000
2001	Confessional	5	Ramon Dominguez	H. Graham Motion	Pin Oak Stable	5 fur.	56.40	$75,000
1994	2000	Race not held						
1993	Logan's Mist	5	Edgar Prado	Francis Campitelli	Fran & Jessie Campitelli	1-1/16	1:42.80	$29,000

== See also ==
- The Very One Stakes top three finishers
- Pimlico Race Course
- List of graded stakes at Pimlico Race Course
