= New York Stakes =

- Class: Grade I
- Location: Belmont Park; Elmont, New York, United States
- Inaugurated: 1940
- Race type: Thoroughbred – Flat racing
- Website: www.nyra.com Belmont

Race information
- Distance: 1 1/4 miles (10 furlongs)
- Surface: Turf
- Track: Left-handed
- Qualification: Fillies & Mares, Four-years-old & up
- Weight: 124 lbs with allowances
- Purse: US$750,000 (2024)

The New York Stakes is a Grade I American thoroughbred horse race for fillies and mares aged four-years-old and older run over a distance of one and one-quarter miles on the turf scheduled annually in early June at Belmont Park in Elmont, New York. The current purse is $750,000.

== History ==
Prior to 1962 the race was open to horses of either sex. For 1972 only, it was restricted to three-year-old fillies.

Inaugurated in 1940 as the New York Handicap at Aqueduct Racetrack, it was moved to Belmont Park in 1961 but returned to Aqueduct in 1963 where it remained until 1975 when it was shifted permanently to Belmont Park. Since its inception, it has been contested at various distances on both dirt and turf:

- 2 1/4 miles : 1940–1950 on dirt
- 1 1/8 miles : 1951–1954 on dirt
- 1 1/8 miles : 1959–1960 on turf
- 1 3/8 miles : 1955–1956, 1958, 1961, on turf
- 1 3/16 miles : 1963–1964, 1968–1971, on turf
- 1 1/16 miles : 1965–1967, 1977–1979, on turf
- 7 furlongs : 1972, on dirt
- 1 1/4 miles : 1980 to present, on turf
- 1 3/16 miles : 2024 on turf - ran at Saratoga Race Course

There was no race run in 1957 and 1973–1975.

The race was run in two divisions in 1960, 1965, 1966, 1969, 1970, 1971, and 1978.

In 2009, due to heavy rains, the race was taken off the turf and shortened from 1 and 1/4 miles to 1 and 1/8 miles.

In 2015, the date for the race was moved to the Friday before the Belmont Stakes as part of the Belmont Racing Festival. For 2016, the purse was increased to $500,000.

In 2022 the event was upgraded to Grade I.

In 2024 and 2025 the race was held at Saratoga Race Course at a distance of 1 3/16 miles.

== Records ==
Speed record: (At current distance of 1 1/4 miles on turf)

- 1:58.40 – Capades (1990)

Most wins:

- 2 – Blue Thor (1963, 1965)
- 2 – Batteur (1964, 1965)
- 2 – Mean Mary (2020, 2021)

Most wins by an owner:

- 3 – Joan & John Phillips and/or Darby Dan Farm (1992, 1999, 2004)
- 3 - Peter M. Brant (1980, 2019, 2022)

Most wins by a jockey:

- 4 – Eddie Arcaro (1947, 1951, 1952, 1953)
- 4 – Ángel Cordero Jr. (1976, 1981, 1990, 1991)
- 4 – Jerry Bailey (1985, 1994, 2000, 2005)

Most wins by a trainer:

- 6 – Chad C. Brown (2016, 2018, 2019, 2022, 2023, 2026)

== Winners ==
Year	Winner	Age	Jockey	Trainer	Owner	Time
2026	Portfolio Duration (GB)	4	Flavien Prat	Chad C. Brown	Klaravich Stables	1:52.50
2025	She Feels Pretty	4	John R. Velazquez	Cherie DeVaux	Lael Stables	2:00.76
2024	Didia (ARG)	6	Jose Ortiz	Ignacio Correas IV	Merriebelle Stables and Resolute Racing	1:52.29
2023	Marketsegmentation	4	Jose Ortiz	Chad C. Brown	Klaravich Stables	2:02.12
2022	Bleecker Street	4	Irad Ortiz Jr.	Chad C. Brown	Peter M. Brant	2:02.58
2021	Mean Mary	5	Luis Saez	H. Graham Motion	Alex G. Campbell Jr.	2:04.68
2020	Mean Mary	4	Luis Saez	H. Graham Motion	Alex G. Campbell Jr.	2:01.85
2019	Homerique	4	Irad Ortiz Jr	Chad C. Brown	Peter M. Brant	2:00.60
2018	Fourstar Crook	6	Irad Ortiz Jr	Chad C. Brown	Michael Dubb, Bethlehem Stables LLC, Gary Aisquith	1:59.21
2017	Hawksmoor	4	Julien Leparoux	Arnaud Delacour	Lael Stables	2:01.18
2016	Dacita (CHI)	5	Irad Ortiz Jr	Chad C. Brown	Sheep Pond Partners & Bradley Thoroughbreds	2:01.46
2015	Waltzing Matilda (IRE)	4	Junior Alvarado	Tommy Stack	Mrs. Paul Shanahan	2:01.30
2014	Riposte (GB)	4	Joel Rosario	William I. Mott	Juddmonte Farms	1:59.71
2013	Starformer	5	Edgar Prado	William I. Mott	Juddmonte Farms	2:00.33
2012	Mystical Star	4	Jose Lezcano	Christophe Clement	Cheyenne Stables	2:00.07
2011	Giants Play	4	Rajiv Maragh	Christophe Clement	Newells Park Stud	2:04.76
2010	Lady Shakespeare	4	John Velazquez	Roger Attfield	Charles Fipke	2:00.34
2009	Icon Project	4	Jose Valdivia Jr.	Martin D. Wolfson	Star Crown Stable	1:49.38
2008	Mauralakana	5	Kent Desormeaux	Christophe Clement	Robert Scarborough	2:01.31
2007	Makderah	4	Alan Garcia	Kiaran McLaughlin	Shadwell Racing	2:00.07
2006	Noble Stella	5	Mike E. Smith	Roger Attfield	Gary A. Tanaka	2:08.26
2005	Wend	4	Jerry Bailey	William I. Mott	Claiborne Farm	2:02.23
2004	Wonder Again	5	Edgar Prado	James J. Toner	Joan & John Phillips	2:05.60
2003	Snow Dance	5	Richard Migliore	John T. Ward Jr.	John C. Oxley	1:59.63
2002	Owsley	4	Edgar Prado	Randy Schulhofer	Arthur B. Hancock III	1:59.81
2001	England's Legend	4	Corey Nakatani	Christophe Clement	Edouard de Rothschild	1:59.63
2000	Perfect Sting	4	Jerry Bailey	Joseph Orseno	Stronach Stable	2:05.36
1999	Soaring Softly	4	Mike E. Smith	James J. Toner	Joan & John Phillips	2:02.20
1998	Auntie Mame	4	John Velazquez	Angel Penna Jr.	Lazy F Ranch	1:59.50
1997	Maxzene	4	Mike E. Smith	Thomas J. Skiffington Jr.	Ken-Mort Stable	1:59.91
1996	Electric Society	5	Jorge F. Chavez	John C. Kimmel	Gary A. Tanaka	2:03.79
1995	Irish Linnet	7	John Velazquez	Leo O'Brien	Austin Delaney	1:59.92
1994	You'd Be Surprised	5	Jerry Bailey	MacKenzie Miller	Rokeby Stables	1:59.69
1993	Aquilegia	4	Julie Krone	Flint S. Schulhofer	Helen K. Groves	1:59.05
1992	Plenty of Grace	5	Julie Krone	John M. Veitch	Darby Dan Farm	2:00.74
1991	Foresta	5	Ángel Cordero Jr.	Thomas Bohannan	Loblolly Stable	1:59.20
1990	Capades	4	Ángel Cordero Jr.	Richard O'Connell	Poma Stable	1:58.40
1989	Miss Unnameable	5	Raul Rojas	Wayne Widmer	Tatt Stable	2:05.80
1988	Beauty Cream	5	Pat Day	Patrick Clark	Warren N. Moore	2:03.00
1987	Anka Germania	5	Craig Perret	Thomas J. Skiffington Jr.	Glencrest Farm	2:01.00
1986	Possible Mate	5	Jean-Luc Samyn	Philip G. Johnson	Edward P. Evans	2:02.40
1985	Powder Break	5	Jerry Bailey	Luis Olivares	Robert Green	2:03.60
1984	Annie Edge	5	Jorge Velásquez	Jonathan Sheppard	Augustin Stable	2:02.20
1983	Sabin	4	Eddie Maple	Woody Stephens	Henryk de Kwiatkowski	2:01.00
1982	Noble Damsel	5	Jorge Velásquez	Michael Kay	G. Watts Humphrey Jr.	2:07.00
1981	Mairzy Doates	5	Ángel Cordero Jr.	Horatio Luro	Arno Schefler	2:04.00
1980	Just A Game	4	Don Brumfield	David A. Whiteley	Peter M. Brant	2:00.40
1979	La Soufriere	4	Jean Cruguet	Eugene Jacobs	Herbert A. Allen Sr.	1:41.20
1978	Late Bloomer	4	Jorge Velásquez	John M. Gaver Jr.	Greentree Stable	1:41.20
1978	Pearl Necklace	4	Ruben Hernandez	Roger Laurin	Reginald N. Webster	1:40.00
1977	Fleet Victress	5	Ruben Hernandez	James W. Maloney	Ralph Kercheval	1:39.20
1976	Sugar Plum Time	4	Ángel Cordero Jr.	John W. Russell	Cynthia Phipps	2:03.20
1972	Barely Even	3	Ray Broussard	Louis M. Goldfine	Mrs. Leonard Gilmartin	1:23.40
1971	Princess Pout	5	Jean Cruguet	Michael Smithwick	June McKnight	1:56.00
1971	Telly	3	Jamie Arellano	William O. Hicks	Cambridge Stable	1:55.20
1970	Last Of The Line	3	Laffit Pincay Jr.	William J. Hirsch	William R. Hawn	1:57.40
1970	Marchandeuse	4	Heliodoro Gustines	Sherrill W. Ward	Lazy F Ranch	1:58.00
1969	Klassy Poppy	4	Michael Hole	Edward Anspach	Harold Minassian	1:55.40
1969	Drumtop	3	Larry Adams	Roger Laurin	James B. Moseley	1:54.40
1968	Ludham	4	Jacinto Vásquez	Frank I. Wright	Happy Hill Farm	1:57.20
1967	Politely	4	Ray Broussard	George M. Baker	Bohemia Stable	1:43.20
1966	Swinging Mood	3	Earlie Fires	Ivan H. Parke	Harbor View Farm	1:44.00
1966	Indian Sunlite	3	Larry Adams	Sherrill W. Ward	George M. Humphrey	1:43.40
1965	Batteur	5	Manuel Ycaza	James W. Maloney	William Haggin Perry	1:42.60
1965	Blue Thor	5	Walter Blum	Thomas Heard Jr.	Charles E. Wilson	1:42.40
1964	Batteur	4	Larry Adams	James W. Maloney	William Haggin Perry	1:55.60
1963	Blue Thor	3	Eugene Monacelli	Oleg Dubassoff	Charles E. Wilson	1:57.00
1962	Honey Dear	4	Johnny Sellers	Ivor G. Balding	C. V. Whitney	2:03.80
1961	Wise Ship	4	Heliodoro Gustines	Jake Byer	Milton J. Ritzenberg	2:14.00
1960	Wolfram	4	Eldon Nelson	Burley Parke	Harbor View Farm	1:50.00
1960	Nickle Boy	5	Ismael Valenzuela	Walter A. Kelley	Elmendorf Farm	1:51.00
1959	Amerigo	4	Bill Hartack	Harris Brown	Mrs. Tilyou Christopher	1:47.00
1958	Anxious Moment	4	Bill Shoemaker	James E. Ryan	Jacnot Farm	2:17.20
1956	Nearque II	7	Ismael Valenzuela	Carl A. Roles	Herman Helbush	2:18.80
1955	Chevation	4	Eric Guerin	Richard E. Handlen	Foxcatcher Farm	2:25.80
1954	Bicarb	4	Ted Atkinson	Philip Bieber	Mrs. Philip Bieber	1:48.60
1953	Crafty Admiral	5	Eddie Arcaro	Robert B. Odom	Charfran Stable	1:48.80
1952	Battlefield	4	Eddie Arcaro	Bert Mulholland	George D. Widener Jr.	1:48.40
1951	Hill Prince	5	Eddie Arcaro	Casey Hayes	Christopher Chenery	1:49.00
1950	Pilaster	6	Robert Martin	Frank A. Bonsal	Frank A. Bonsal (Lessee)	3:52.60
1949	Donor	5	Warren Mehrtens	George P. "Maj" Odom	Mrs. W. Deering Howe	3:51.20
1948	Miss Grillo	6	Conn McCreary	Horatio Luro	Mill River Stable	3:53.60
1947	Rico Monte	5	Eddie Arcaro	Horatio Luro	W. Arnold Hanger	3:48.40
1946	Stymie	5	Basil James	Hirsch Jacobs	Ethel D. Jacobs	3:51.20
1945	Reply Paid	3	Warren Mehrtens	George W. Carroll	Mrs. L. Rabinowitz	3:53.80
1944	Caribou	5	Ted Atkinson	Preston M. Burch	Brookmeade Stable	3:53.00
1943	Bolingbroke	6	Steve Brooks	Walter Burrows	Townsend B. Martin	3:52.20
1942	Alsab	3	Carroll Bierman	Sarge Swenke	Mrs. Albert Sabath	3:47.20
1941	Fenelon	4	James Stout	James Fitzsimmons	Belair Stud	3:47.00
1940	Shot Put	4	Willie Garner	Donald McEachern	Mrs. Marie Evans	3:48.80

== See also ==
- New York Handicap Triple
