= Jim McKay Turf Sprint =

- Class: Listed Stakes
- Location: Pimlico Race Course, Baltimore, Maryland, United States
- Inaugurated: 2006
- Race type: Thoroughbred - Flat racing
- Website: www.pimlico.com

Race information
- Distance: 5 furlongs
- Surface: Turf
- Track: Left-handed
- Qualification: Three-years-old & up
- Weight: Assigned
- Purse: $125,000

The Jim McKay Turf Sprint is a Listed American Thoroughbred horse race for three-year-olds and up over a distance of five furlongs on the turf held as part of the undercard for the Black-Eyed Susan Stakes annually during the third week of May at Pimlico Race Course in Baltimore, Maryland. The race offers a purse of $125,000.

The Jim McKay Turf Sprint is the lead off leg of the Mid Atlantic Thoroughbred Championships Sprint Turf Division or MATCh Races. MATCh is a series of five races in five separate thoroughbred divisions run throughout four Mid-Atlantic States including; Pimlico Race Course and Laurel Park Racecourse in Maryland; Delaware Park Racetrack in Delaware; Parx, Philadelphia Park and Presque Isle Downs in Pennsylvania and Monmouth Park in New Jersey.

== Race name ==
The race was named in honor of James Kenneth McManus (1921–2008), better known by his professional name of Jim McKay, was an American television sports journalist. McKay is best known for hosting ABC's Wide World of Sports (1961–1998). McKay covered a wide variety of special events, including horse races such as the Kentucky Derby, the Preakness Stakes, golf events such as the British Open, and the Indianapolis 500.

== History ==
The Jim McKay Turf Sprint was first run in 2006 as the Baltimore Breeders' Cup Turf Sprint. In 2007, it ran as the Baltimore City Turf Sprint and in 2008 the race was known as the Old Mutual Turf Sprint. The stakes record is held by Heros Reward, who won the race in 2007 in a time of :55.90 over five furlongs.

== Records ==
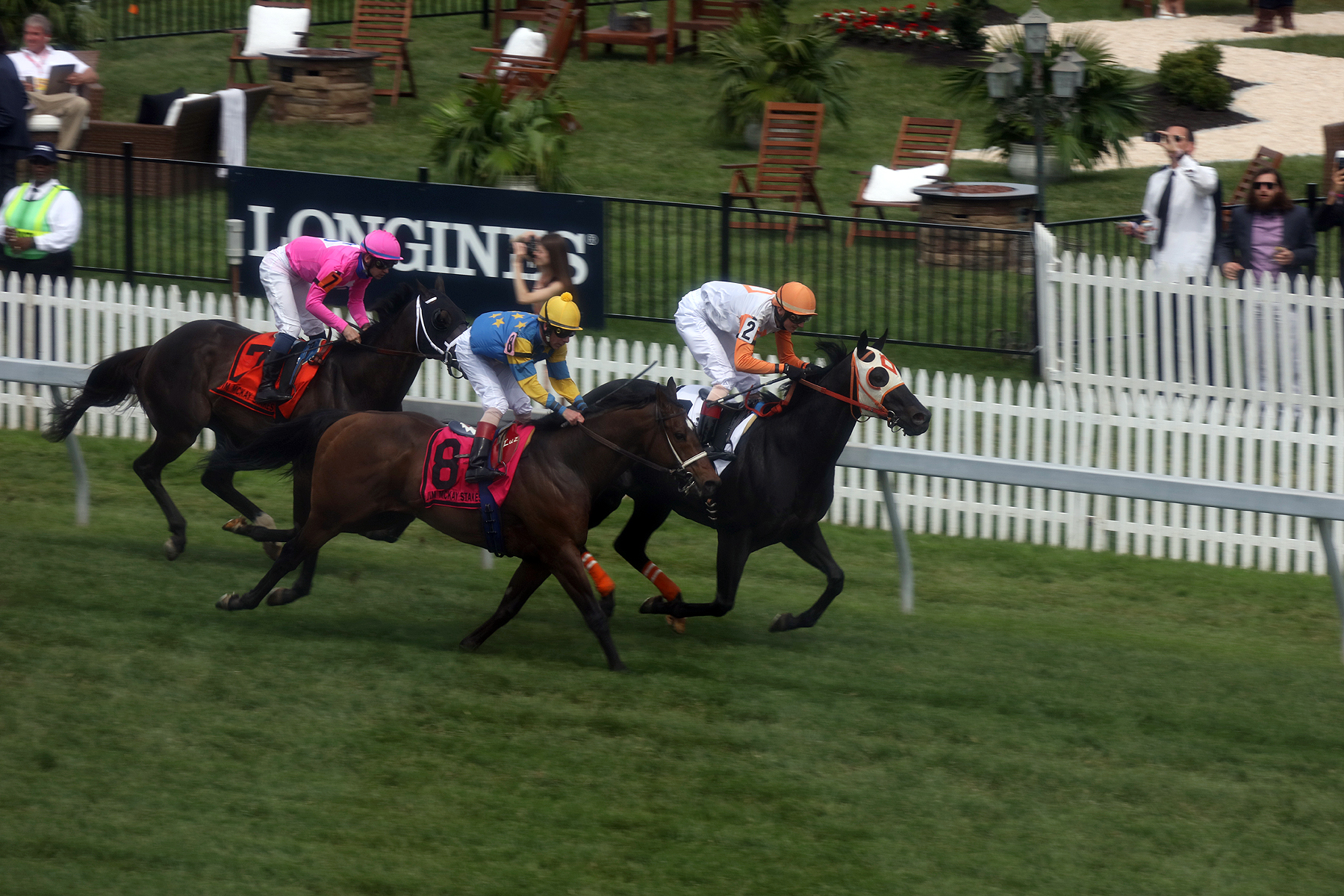
Ben's Cat wins the 2016 Jim McKay Turf Sprint

Speed record:

- 5 furlongs - 55 4/5 - Hero's Reward (2007)

Most wins by a horse:

- 5 - Ben's Cat (2011, 2013, 2014, 2015 & 2016)

Most wins by a jockey:

- 3 - Julian Pimentel (2013, 2014 & 2015)

Most wins by a trainer:

- 5 - King T. Leatherbury (2011, 2013, 2014, 2015 & 2016)

Most wins by an owner:

- 5 - The Jim Stable (2011, 2013, 2014, 2015 & 2016)

== Winners of the Jim McKay Turf Sprint since 2006 ==
Year	Winner	Age	Jockey	Trainer	Owner	Distance	Time	Purse
2026	Chasing Liberty	4	Irad Ortiz Jr.	Rob Atras	Twin Creeks Racing & CMNWLTH	5 1/2 fur.	1:01.37	$125,000
2025	Witty	6	Flavien Prat	Elizabeth M. Merryman	Qatar Racing, Marc Detampel & Elizabeth M. Merryman	5 fur.	59.61	$100,000
2024	Grooms All Bizness	5	Jorge Ruiz	Jorge Duarte Jr.	Colts Neck Stables	5 fur.	1:01.08	$100,000
2023	Beer Can Man	5	Flavien Prat	Philip D’Amato	Little Red Feather Racing, Madaket Stables & Sterling Stables	5 fur.	55.56	$100,000
2022	Carotari	6	Luis Saez	Brian A. Lynch	William A. Branch	5 fur.	56.52	$100,000
2021	Firecrow	5	Joel Rosario	Ron Moquett	Robert LaPuenta	5 fur.	55.30	$100,000
2020	Hollis	5	Gabriel Saez	John Alexander Ortiz	WSS Racing, LLC	5 fur.	59.61	$100,000
2019	Completed Pass	5	Victor Carrasco	Claudio Gonzalez	Robert D. Bone	5 fur.	57.35	$100,000
2018	Imprimis	4	Irad Ortiz	Joseph Orseno	Breeze Easy, LLC	5 fur.	1:03.81	$100,000
2017	Richard's Boy	5	Paco Lopez	Peter Miller	Rockingham Ranch	5 fur.	56.20	$100,000
2016	Ben's Cat	10	Trevor McCarthy	King T. Leatherbury	The Jim Stable	5 fur.	56.10	$100,000
2015	Ben's Cat	9	Julian Pimentel	King T. Leatherbury	The Jim Stable	5 fur.	56.04	$100,000
2014	Ben's Cat	8	Julian Pimentel	King T. Leatherbury	The Jim Stable	5 fur.	57.75	$100,000
2013	Ben's Cat	7	Julian Pimentel	King T. Leatherbury	The Jim Stable	5 fur.	56.18	$100,000
2012	Fidlers Patriot	6	John Velazquez	George Weaver	J. Olson & Hill Stable	5 fur.	56.12	$100,000
2011	Ben's Cat	5	Jeremy Rose	King T. Leatherbury	The Jim Stable	5 fur.	59.71	$75,000
2010	Central City	4	Julien Leparoux	Ronnie W. Werner	Preston Stable LLC	5 fur.	56.18	$70,000
2009	Mr. Nightlinger	5	Jamie Theriot	William B. Calhoun	Martin Racing Stable	5 fur.	56.29	$100,000
2008	Heros Reward	6	Javier Castellano	Dale Capuano	Rob Ry Farm	5 fur.	59.19	$100,000
2007	Heros Reward	5	Edgar Prado	Dale Capuano	Rob Ry Farm	5 fur.	55.90	$100,000
2006	My Lord	7	Rosie Napravnik	Ann W. Merryman	David A. Ross	5 fur.	57.40	$100,000

== See also ==
- Jim McKay Turf Sprint top three finishers
- Pimlico Race Course
- List of graded stakes at Pimlico Race Course
