= Hilltop Stakes =

- Class: Listed
- Location: Pimlico Race Course, Baltimore, Maryland, United States
- Inaugurated: 1973
- Race type: Thoroughbred - Flat racing
- Website: www.pimlico.com

Race information
- Distance: 1 mile
- Surface: Turf
- Track: Left-handed
- Qualification: Three-year-old fillies
- Weight: 124 lbs with allowances
- Purse: $125,000

The Hilltop Stakes is an American ungraded Thoroughbred horse race for three-year-old fillies over a distance of one mile on turf held annually at Pimlico Race Course in Baltimore, Maryland.

== History ==
The Hilltop Stakes was run on the second Saturday of May each year exactly one week prior to the Preakness Stakes. In 2015 the race was scheduled on the Friday, the day before the Preakness. when the Black-Eyed Susan Stakes is held. The race is named in honor of the nickname for Pimlico Race Course. The nickname "Old Hilltop" was given to the venerable track in Baltimore, Maryland because of a large hill in the infield that was very prominent and gave race goers a 360" bird's-eye view of the entire track. In 1938 the hill top was leveled so that movie cameras and patrons in the grandstand could see the race on the backside of the track while the horses were racing.

The race was run on the main track on a dirt surface prior to 1988. It was also run on the main track in 1995 and 2003 due to a yielding turf and poor weather. In 1997, Francine Villeneuve became the first female jockey to win the race.

== Records ==
Speed record:

- 1 1/16 miles - 1:41.40 - Captive Miss (1992)
- 1 mile - 1:36.20 - Another Paddock (1988)

Most wins by a jockey:

- 3 - Gregg McCarron (1974, 1978, 1989)
- 3 - Mario Pino (1987, 1999, 2002)
- 3 - John R. Velazquez (2011, 2012, 2015)

== Winners of the Hilltop Stakes ==
Year	Winner	Jockey	Trainer	Owner	Dist. (Miles)	Time	Purse
2026	Coach Mazzula	Jevian Toledo	Brittany T. Russell	Madaket Stables	1 mile	1:35.52	$125,000
2025	Play With Fire	Flavien Prat	Brendan P. Walsh	Fergus Galvin	1 mile	1:39.11	$125,000
2024	She Feels Pretty	John R. Velazquez	Cherie DeVaux	Lael Stables	1 mile	1:38.59	$100,000
2023	Aspray	Flavien Prat	Chad C. Brown	Ran Jan Racing	1 mile	1:34.10	$100,000
2022	Pizza Bianca	José Ortiz	Christophe Clement	Bobby Flay	1 mile	1:36.54	$100,000
2021	Alda	John R. Velazquez	H. Graham Motion	Wertheimer and Frere	1 mile	1:35.06	$100,000
2020	Evil Lyn	Horacio Karamanos	Michael Maker	Paradise Farms Corp.	1 mile	1:42.25	$100,000
2019	Dogtag	Javier Castellano	Chad Brown	LNJ Foxwoods	1 mile	1:36.71	$100,000
2018	Souper Striking	Julian Pimetel	Michael Trombetta	Live Oak Plantation	1-1/8	1:51.72	$100,000
2017	Happy Mesa	Javier Castellano	H. Graham Motion	Great Point Stables	1 mile	1:33.61	$100,000
2016	Gone Away	Florent Geroux	Michael Matz	Augustin Stable	1-1/16	1:41.68	$100,000
2015	Miss Temple City	John R. Velazquez	H. Graham Motion	Sagamore Farm	1-1/16	1:41.94	$100,000
2014	Our Epiphany	Grant Whitacre	Dane Kobiskie	PTK LLC	1-1/16	1:48.07	$100,000
2013	Emotional Kitten	Joel Rosario	Wesley Ward	Ken & Sarah Ramsey	1-1/16	1:41.98	$100,000
2012	Coup	John Velazquez	H. Graham Motion	Augustin Stable	1-1/16	1:42.71	$100,000
2011	Excited	John Velazquez	Todd A. Pletcher	Michael B. Tabor	1-1/16	1:49.48	$75,000
2010	Joharmony	Javier Castellano	Leigh Delacour	Gary L. Chervenell	1-1/16	1:44.17	$70,000
2009	Blind Date	Jeremy Rose	Hamilton A. Smith	William M. Backer	1-1/16	1:42.89	$60,000
2008	Hartigan	Luis Garcia	Richard W. Small	Robert Meyerhoff	1-1/16	1:46.24	$60,000
2007	Street Sounds	Ramon Dominguez	Michael R. Matz	Hidden Creek Farm	1 mile	1:36.60	$80,000
2006	Ebony Rose	Chris Decarlo	Todd A. Pletcher	Gene Mello	1-1/16	1:49.60	$85,000
2005	My Typhoon	Jerry Bailey	William I. Mott	Peter Vegso	1-1/16	1:44.20	$75,000
2004	Western Ransom	Ryan Fogelsonger	Michael Dickinson	Dr. John A. Chandler	1-1/16	1:43.20	$50,000
2003	City Fire	Jeremy Rose	Mark Shuman	Michael Gill	1-1/16	1:44.20	$50,000
2002	Ntombi	Mario Pino	Michael Dickinson	Dr. John A. Chandler	1-1/16	1:42.20	$50,000
2001	Guillotine	Mark T. Johnston	Hamilton A. Smith	Janis Gerace	1-1/16	1:45.00	$75,000
2000	Azireprice	Sidney Lejeune, Jr.	Thomas Amoss	On Target Racing Stable	1-1/16	1:43.20	$50,000
1999	Polish Miss	Mario Pino	Bruce C. Jackson	Mary Kernan	1-1/16	1:44.80	$50,000
1998	Proud Owner	Darci Rice	Richard W. Small	Thomas Bowman& Small	1-1/16	1:43.00	$57,000
1997	Cozy Blues	Fran Villeneuve	James E. Baker	Adam Wachtel	1-1/16	1:44.00	$75,000
1997	Earth to Jackie	Robert Colton	J. William Boniface	Jacquelyn Schipke	1-1/16	1:44.00	$75,000
1996	Silent Greeting	Larry Reynolds	H. Graham Motion	Joe L. Allbritton	1-1/16	1:46.40	$58,000
1995	Jhenais Jewel	Raphael Verderosa	Josephine Owens	Mrs. Jack Jeweler	1-1/16	1:45.60	$58,000
1994	Irish Forever	Jorge Chavez	J. William Boniface	Roger Schipke	1-1/16	1:43.60	$57,000
1993	Open Toe	Mike Luzzi	James W. Murphy	Pomerosa Farms	1-1/16	1:42.40	$57,000
1992	Captive Miss	Joe Bravo	Philip M. Serpe	Live Oak Stud	1-1/16	1:41.40	$60,000
1991	Grab the Green	Edgar Prado	Barclay Tagg	Samuel H. Rogers Jr.	1-1/16	1:44.60	$58,000
1990	Valay Maid	Marco Castaneda	Carlos A. Garcia	C. Oliver Goldsmith	1-1/16	1:42.60	$58,000
1989	Seraglio	Gregg McCarron	Richard W. Small	Robert E. Meyerhoff	1-1/16	1:48.80	$68,500
1988	Another Paddock	Nick Santagata	George Pagano	George Steinbrenner	1 mile	1:36.20	$60,000
1987	Artic Cloud	Mario Pino		William T. Fitzgibbons	1-1/16	1:44.40	$50,000
1986	Country Recital	Vincent Bracciale			1-1/16	1:46.00	$36,500
1985	A Joyful Spray	Philip Grove		John A. Manfuso	1-1/16	1:43.60	$36,500
1984	Squan Song	Fernando Hernandez	Carlos A. Garcia	Mrs. Peter F. Green	1-1/16	1:44.60	$36,500
1983	Final Chapter	Danny Wright	Richard W. Small		1-1/16	1:45.40	$36,500
1982	Martie's Double	Rudy Turcotte			1-1/16	1:43.60	$36,500
1981	Anti Phil	Danny Wright		Anthony E. Verdi	1-1/16	1:46.40	$36,500
1980	Weber City Miss	Vincent Bracciale			1-1/16	1:45.00	$36,500
1979	Heavy Sugar	Mark Drury			1-1/16	1:45.20	$36,500
1978	Caesar's Wish	Gregg McCarron	Richard W. Small	Sally M. Gibson	1-1/16	1:45.00	$35,000
1977	Enthused	Chris McCarron			1-1/16	1:45.40	$28,000
1976	Dance My Love	George Cusimano			1-1/16	1:46.40	$30,700
1975	Quick Selection	George Cusimano			1-1/16	1:45.00	$36,000
1974	Four Bells	Gregg McCarron			1-1/16	1:43.20	$30,500
1973	Maybe Crafty	Eldon Nelson			1-1/16	1:46.60	$30,000

== See also ==
- Hilltop Stakes top three finishers
- Pimlico Race Course
- List of graded stakes at Pimlico Race Course
