= American Oaks =

- Class: Grade 1
- Location: Santa Anita Park; Arcadia, California, US
- Inaugurated: 2002 (at Hollywood Park Racetrack as American Oaks Invitational)
- Race type: Thoroughbred - Flat racing
- Website: Santa Anita Park

Race information
- Distance: 1 1/4 miles
- Surface: Turf
- Track: Left-handed
- Qualification: Three-year-old Fillies
- Weight: 124 lbs.
- Purse: $300,000 (2019)

The American Oaks is a Grade I American thoroughbred horse race for three-year-old fillies over a distance of one and one-quarter miles on the turf held annually in late December Santa Anita Park in Arcadia, California, United States. The event currently offers a purse of US$300,000.

== History ==
The inaugural running of the event was on 6 July 2002 as the American Oaks Invitational at Hollywood Park Racetrack in Inglewood, California with a purse of $500,000. The event was won by the British-bred filly Megahertz who was ridden by US Hall of Fame jockey Alex Solis and trained by US Hall of Fame trainer Bobby Frankel on a disqualification of Dublino who had crossed the finishing line first. Dublino had bumped Megahertz in the stretch drive, and then the whip of jockey Kent Desormeaux hit Megahertz twice in the face, making Megahertz end the race a half-length behind.

The following year, 2003, with a purse increase to $750,000 the winner was the Irish-trained filly Dimitrova who had previously run third in the Irish 1,000 Guineas.

In 2004 for the third running of the event, American Graded Stakes Committee classified the event with the highest status possible as Grade I. As an invitational event Hollywood Park attempted to attract fillies from around the world. Entrants in the first time the event held Grade I status included fillies from Great Britain, Ireland, France, New Zealand and Japan. The Japanese filly Dance in the Mood finished second as the 7/5 favorite to the English-bred Ticker Tape.

Horse racing history was made on July 3, 2005, when Japanese-bred Cesario, a granddaughter of Sunday Silence, trounced the 6/5 favored and previously undefeated Melhor Ainda, racing away with a sizable four-length margin of victory. Cesario became the first Japanese-bred and Japan-based racehorse in nearly a half-century to win a US stakes race (Hakuchikara won the Washington's Birthday Handicap at Santa Anita in 1959 upsetting US champion Round Table). Cesario's 2005 victory win was big news in Japan, as Japanese media swarmed Cesario and her rider, Yuichi Fukunaga in the winner's circle as the Japanese flag waved over an American holiday weekend. Before the race, Japan TV broadcast a one-hour-long TV show live from Hollywood Park about Cesario and her run at the American Oaks. Cesario's running time of 1:59.03 stood as a stakes record until 2024.

In the 2006 running of the event Arindel Farms's Wait A While sent off as the 3/1 third choice in a field of eight, drew off to an impressive 4 1/2-length victory over 8-5 favorite Asahi Rising (JPN) and Arravale (CAN) in the invitational's fifth running. Trained by Eclipse Award winner Todd Pletcher, Wait A While was making just her second career start on the turf. Jockey Garrett Gomez stalked the early pace set by Attima (GB) and made a sweeping three-wide move around the second turn, clearing the field under mild left-handed urging. The connections had to wait several minutes for the race to be declared official after Alex Bisono, rider of Foxysox, alleged interference against Wait a While. Bisono claimed that Wait a While forced him to take up near the quarter-pole as the winner was making her sweeping move to the front of the pack. However, stewards disallowed it, saying Attima caused the traffic problem.

By 2009 was the last running of the event as an Invitational. In 2010 purse money of the event was slashed to $250,000.

The 2011 running of the event produced a dead-heat between Nereid and Cambina which was the first in a Grade I at Hollywood Park since the Richard Mandella-trained pair of Beautiful Melody and Reluctant Guest finished on even terms in the Beverly Hills Handicap on June 30, 1990. It was also the first Grade I victory for both fillies.

With the closure of Hollywood Park Racetrack in 2013 the event was moved to Santa Anita Racetrack.

In 2014 and 2015 the event was scheduled in May and since 2016 in December usually on opening day of the Santa Anita Park Winter Meeting.

The race was originally run at 1 1/4 miles but in 2016 was cut back to 1 1/8 miles to prevent runners from having to race down the Santa Anita hillside turf course and cross the dirt main track. It returned to 1 1/4 miles in 2017.

In 2021 the race was transferred from the turf surface to dirt for first time in the history of its runnings, which automatically downgraded the status of the race from a Grade I event to a Grade II. However, after review the Grade I status was reinstated.

Cygames, the Japanese company behind the Umamusume: Pretty Derby franchise, was the presenting sponsor of the American Oaks in 2025.

== Records ==
Speed record:

- 1 1/4 miles: 1:58.69 – She Feels Pretty (2024)

Margins:

- 4 1/2 lengths – Wait A While (2006)

Most wins by a jockey:

- 3 – Kent Desormeaux (2004, 2009, 2016)
- 3 – Mike E. Smith (2012, 2013, 2017)

Most wins by a trainer:

- 2 – Todd Pletcher (2006, 2007)
- 2 – John Shirreffs (2010, 2011)
- 2 – Richard Baltas (2015, 2019)
- 2 – Chad C. Brown (2018, 2020)

Most wins by an owner :

- 2 - Klaravich Stables (2018, 2020)
- 2 - Eclipse Thoroughbred Partners (2021, 2023)

== Winners ==
Year	Winner	Jockey	Trainer	Owner	Distance	Time	Purse	Grade	Ref
At Santa Anita Park
2025	Ambaya	Kazushi Kimura	Jonathan Thomas	Augustin Stables	1 1/4 miles	2:01.02	$303,000	I	
2024	She Feels Pretty	John R. Velazquez	Cherie DeVaux	Lael Stables (Roy & Gretchen Jackson)	1 1/4 miles	1:58.69	$303,000	I	
2023	Anisette (GB)	Umberto Rispoli	Leonard Powell	Eclipse Thoroughbred Partners	1 1/4 miles	2:00.22	$300,000	I	
2022	Rhea Moon (IRE)	Juan J. Hernandez	Philip D'Amato	Rockingham Ranch & Talla Racing	1 1/4 miles	2:00.75	$301,000	I	
2021	Queen Goddess	Juan Hernandez	Michael McCarthy	Eclipse Thoroughbred Partners & TOLO Thoroughreds	1 1/4 miles	2:04.72	$302,500	I	Off turf
2020	Duopoly	Flavien Prat	Chad C. Brown	Klaravich Stables	1 1/4 miles	2:01.70	$302,500	I	
2019	Lady Prancealot (IRE)	Joe Bravo	Richard Baltas	Craig & Josie Arntz, Donald Durando, Jerry McClanahan, Jules & Michael Iavarone, Jerry McClanahan	1 1/4 miles	2:01.70	$301,053	I	
2018	Competitionofideas	Joel Rosario	Chad C. Brown	Klaravich Stables	1 1/4 miles	1:59.77	$301,035	I	
2017	Daddys Lil Darling	Mike E. Smith	Kenneth G. McPeek	Normandy Farm	1 1/4 miles	2:00.11	$301,380	I	
2016	Decked Out	Kent J. Desormeaux	J. Keith Desormeaux	Head of Plains Partners, Big Chief Racing & Gene A. Voss	1 1/8 miles	1:47.86	$302,415	I	
2015	Spanish Queen	Brice Blanc	Richard Baltas	Harry Bederian, Harout Kamberian & Hagop Nakkashian	1 1/4 miles	2:01.93	$400,250	I	
2014	Room Service	Shaun Bridgmohan	Wayne M. Catalano	Gary & Mary West	1 1/4 miles	2:01.28	$350,750	I	
At Hollywood Park
2013	Emollient	Mike E. Smith	William I. Mott	Juddmonte Farms	1 1/4 miles	2:02.38	$350,750	I	
2012	Lady of Shamrock	Mike E. Smith	John W. Sadler	Hronis Racing	1 1/4 miles	2:03.19	$350,000	I	
2011	Cambina (IRE)	Martin Garcia	Jeffrey L. Bonde	Anthony Bilich, Charles Cline, George Schmitt, Dennis Raihill et al	1 1/4 miles	2:01.46	$250,000	I	Dead heat
2011	Nereid	Joseph Talamo	John Shirreffs	Eric N. Kronfeld	1 1/4 miles	2:01.46	$250,000	I	Dead heat
2010	Harmonious	Martin Garcia	John Shirreffs	Pam and Marty Wygod	1 1/4 miles	2:01.77	$250,000	I	
2009	Gozzip Girl	Kent J. Desormeaux	Thomas Albertrani	Farnsworth Stables	1 1/4 miles	2:00.22	$700,000	I	
2008	Pure Clan	Julien R. Leparoux	Robert E. Holthus	Lewis G. Lakin, IEAH Stables & Pegasus Holding Group Stable	1 1/4 miles	2:00.50	$750,000	I	
2007	Panty Raid	Edgar S. Prado	Todd A. Pletcher	Glencrest Farm LLC	1 1/4 miles	2:01.53	$750,000	I	
2006	Wait A While	Garrett K. Gomez	Todd A. Pletcher	Arindel Farms	1 1/4 miles	1:59.38	$750,000	I	
2005	Cesario (JPN)	Yuichi Fukunaga	Katsuhiko Sumii	U Carrot Farm	1 1/4 miles	1:59.03	$750,000	I	
2004	Ticker Tape (GB)	Kent J. Desormeaux	James M. Cassidy	Jim Ford, Deron Pearson & Jack Sweesy	1 1/4 miles	2:01.54	$750,000	I	
2003	Dimitrova	David R. Flores	Dermot K. Weld	Joseph Higgins	1 1/4 miles	1:59.98	$750,000	Listed	
2002	†Megahertz (GB)	Alex O. Solis	Robert J. Frankel	Michael Bello	1 1/4 miles	2:00:46	$500,000	Listed	

Legend:
Dirt Turf
Notes:
† In the 2002 inaugural running, Dublino was first past the post but was disqualified for interference in the straight and Megahertz (GB) was declared the winner.

== See also ==
- List of American and Canadian Graded races
