= E. P. Taylor Stakes =

Turf horse race in Canada

- Class: Grade I
- Location: Woodbine Racetrack, Toronto, Canada
- Inaugurated: 1956
- Race type: Thoroughbred – Flat racing
- Website: Woodbine Racetrack

Race information
- Distance: 1 1/4 miles (10 furlongs)
- Surface: Turf
- Track: Left-handed
- Qualification: Three-year-olds and up fillies and mares
- Weight: Scale weight
- Purse: CAN$750,000

The E. P. Taylor Stakes is a Thoroughbred horse race for fillies and mares held annually since 1956 in October at Woodbine Racetrack in Toronto, Ontario, Canada. It is run on the E. P. Taylor turf course at a distance of 1 1/4 miles.

Originally run as the Nettie Handicap, the race was renamed in 1981 to honor the late Edward Plunket Taylor, President of the Ontario Jockey Club from 1953 to 1973 and a founder of the Jockey Club of Canada. An inductee of the Canadian Horse Racing Hall of Fame, E. P. Taylor owned Windfields Farm, Canada's most successful horse breeding operation.

The E. P. Taylor Stakes is a Grade I event with a purse of CAN$750,000 and draws horses from across North America as well as Europe. It is raced as a companion event to the Canadian International Stakes and can be a final stepping stone for the Breeders' Cup Filly & Mare Turf, depending on the time frame between the running of the two races.

On March 27, 2025 it was announced that the E. P. Taylor Stakes is now part of the Breeders' Cup Challenge series.

== Distances ==
Over the years, the race has been contested at various distances:

- 1956–1961 – 1 1/16 miles on dirt at Greenwood Raceway
- 1962–1963 – 1 1/16 miles on dirt at Woodbine Racetrack
- 1964–1967 – 1 1/8 miles on dirt at Woodbine Racetrack
- 1968 to date – 1 1/4 miles on turf at Woodbine Racetrack

== Records ==
Time record: (at current 1 1/4 miles distance on turf)

- 2:00.68 – Mrs. Lindsay (2007)

Most wins:

- 2 – Kitty Girl (1957, 1958)

Most wins by an owner:

- 3 – Gardiner Farm (1968, 1969, 1970)

Most wins by a jockey:

- 3 – Sandy Hawley (1976, 1978, 1982)
- 3 – John R. Velazquez (2004, 2005, 2011)

Most wins by a trainer:

- 3 – Lou Cavalaris Jr. (1968, 1969, 1970)
- 3 – Frank H. Merrill Jr. (1960, 1964, 1973)
- 3 – Maurice Zilber (1975, 1978, 1982)

== Winners ==
Year	Winner	Age	Jockey	Trainer	Owner	Time	Ref
2026	Gimme A Nother (SAF)	6	John R. Velazquez	H. Graham Motion	Newstead Stables LLC	2:02.71	
2025	She Feels Pretty	4	John R. Velazquez	Cherie DeVaux	Lael Stables	2:00.80	
2024	Full Count Felicia	5	Kazushi Kimura	Kevin Attard	Gold Square LLC	1:59.29	
2023	Fev Rover (IRE)	5	Javier Castellano	Mark E. Casse	Tracy Farmer	2:04.20	
2022	Rougir (FR)	4	Kazushi Kimura	Chad C. Brown	Peter M. Brant & Michael Tabor	2:02.62	
2021	Mutamakina	5	Dylan Davis	Christophe Clement	Al Shira'aa Farms	2:09.14	
2020	Etoile	4	Rafael Manuel Hernandez	Chad C. Brown	Peter Brant, Mrs M V Magnier, Mrs Paul Shanahan	2:03.12	
2019	Starship Jubilee	6	Luis Contreras	Kevin Attard	Blue Heaven Farm	2:03.29	
2018	Sheikha Reika	3	Andrea Atzeni	Roger Varian	Mohammed Obaid Al Maktoum	2:05.10	
2017	Blond Me (IRE)	5	Oisin Murphy	Andrew Balding	Mrs. Barbara M. Keller	2:08.08	
2016	Al's Gal	5	Florent Geroux	Michael J. Maker	Kenneth and Sarah Ramsey	2:01.60	
2015	Curvy	3	Ryan Moore	David Wachman	John Magnier, Michael Tabor & Derrick Smith	2:02.88	
2014	Just The Judge (IRE)	4	Jamie Spencer	Charles Hills	Qatar Racing & Sangster family	2:03.47	
2013	Tannery (IRE)	4	Joel Rosario	Alan E. Goldberg	Richard Santulli	2:07.13	
2012	Siyouma	4	Gérald Mossé	François Doumen	Robert Jeffcock	2:03.04	
2011	Miss Keller	5	John Velazquez	Roger Attfield	Three Chimneys, Lordship Stud & McStay	2:06.98	
2010	Reggane	4	Christophe Soumillon	Alain de Royer-Dupré	Haras De La Perelle	2:03.88	
2009	Lahaleeb	3	William Buick	Mick Channon	M. Al-Qatami & K. Al-Mudhaf	2:02.89	
2008	Folk Opera	4	Frankie Dettori	Saeed bin Suroor	Godolphin	2:03.70	
2007	Mrs. Lindsay	3	Johnny Murtagh	François Rohaut	Bettina Jenney	2:00.68	
2006	Arravale	3	Jose Valdivia Jr.	Macdonald Benson	Robert J. Costigan	2:10.34	
2005	Honey Ryder	4	John Velazquez	Todd A. Pletcher	Glencrest Farm LLC	2:06.70	
2004	Commercante	4	John Velazquez	Robert J. Frankel	A. Falourd/H. Guy/R. Trussell	2:04.02	
2003	Volga	5	Richard Migliore	Kiaran McLaughlin	H. Joseph Allen	2:05.68	
2002	Fraulein	3	Kevin Darley	Ed Dunlop	Philip Freedman	2:10.03	
2001	Choc Ice	3	Johnny Murtagh	Robert Collet	Micheline Vidal	2:03.01	
2000	Fly For Avie	5	Todd Kabel	David R. Bell	Ivan Dalos	2:03.78	
1999	Insight	4	Mike E. Smith	John Hammond	Flaxman Holdings	2:05.34	
1998	Zomaradah	3	Gary Stevens	Luca Cumani	Darley Racing	2:02.40	
1997	Kool Kat Katie	3	Olivier Peslier	David Loder	Augustin Stable	2:02.00	
1996	Wandering Star	3	Herb McCauley	James Fanshawe	H. Joseph Allen	2:04.60	
1995	Timarida	3	Frankie Dettori	John Oxx	H H Aga Khan IV	2:03.60	
1994	Truly A Dream	3	Chris McCarron	Robert Collet	Richard C. Strauss	2:01.60	
1993	Hero's Love	5	Earlie Fires	Daniel J. Vella	Frank Stronach	2:14.40	
1992	Hatoof	3	Walter Swinburn	Criquette Head	Sheikh Maktoum	2:07.80	
1991	Lady Shirl	4	Garrett Gomez	P. Noel Hickey	Irish Acres Farm	2:02.40	
1990	Ruby Tiger	3	Richard Quinn	Paul F. I. Cole	Susan Blacker	2:09.60	
1989	Braiswick	3	Gary Carter	Geoff Wragg	Sheikh Mohammed	2:08.40	
1988	Sudden Love	3	Ray Cochrane	Luca Cumani	Lucy Ruspoli	2:02.80	
1987	Khariyda	3	Yves Saint-Martin	Alain de Royer-Dupré	H H Aga Khan IV	2:05.40	
1986	Ivor's Image	3	Walter Swinburn	Michael Stoute	Simon Fraser	2:14.40	
1985	Devalois	3	Freddy Head	Alec Head	Ghislaine Head	2:05.80	
1984	Reine Mathilde	3	Gary W. Moore	Alec Head	Ecurie Aland	2:04.20	
1983	L'Attrayante	3	Alain Lequeux	Olivier Douïeb	Allen E. Paulson	2:07.40	
1982	Vidor	3	Sandy Hawley	Maurice Zilber	Nelson Bunker Hunt	2:09.80	
1981	De La Rose	3	Eddie Maple	Woody Stephens	Henryk de Kwiatkowski	2:05.40	
1980	Liveinthesunshine	5	Robin Platts	P. Noel Hickey	Irish Acres Farm	2:08.00	
1979	Senorita Poquito	3	Brian Swatuk	Emile Allain	Harlequin Ranches	2:10.20	
1978	Neatrice	3	Sandy Hawley	Maurice Zilber	B. K. Y. Stable	2:04.40	
1977	Majestic Kahala	3	Gary Stahlbaum	J. Mort Hardy	Windhaven	2:12.80	
1976	Momigi	4	Sandy Hawley	John Morahan	Koichiro Hayata	2:10.60	
1975	Adieu II	3	Lloyd Duffy	Maurice Zilber	Nelson Bunker Hunt	2:06.40	
1974	Protectora	5	Heliodoro Gustines	Warren Pascuma	Seltzer & Fairhurst	2:02.60	
1973	Square Angel	3	Avelino Gomez	Frank H. Merrill Jr.	W. Preston Gilbride	2:02.80	
1972	Belle Geste	4	Noel Turcotte	Carl F. Chapman	Beatrice Latimer	2:04.80	
1971	Tudor Queen	4	Don Hale	Gil Rowntree	Stafford Farms	2:02.00	
1970	Mary of Scotland	3	Richard Grubb	Lou Cavalaris Jr.	Gardiner Farm	2:07.80	
1969	Plegada	5	R. Stewart	Lou Cavalaris Jr.	Gardiner Farm	2:03.60	
1968	Ice Water	5	Robin Platts	Lou Cavalaris Jr.	Gardiner Farm	2:04.00	
1967	Hinemoa	4	Avelino Gomez	Paul Cooper	Doug Banks	1:50.80	
1966	Speedy Lament	5	Frank Barroby	Arthur H. Warner	Armstrong Bros. Stable	1:52.40	
1965	Northern Queen	3	Wayne Harris	Horatio Luro	Windfields Farm	1:49.60	
1964	Etimota	4	Paul J. Bailey	Frank H. Merrill Jr.	Mrs. H. A. Luro	1:50.60	
1963	Court Royal	4	Jim Fitzsimmons	N. Julius	J. E. Frowde Seagram	1:44.00	
1962	Royal Spirit	3	Harlon Dalton	John Passero	Stafford Farms	1:43.60	
1961	Victoria Regina	3	Jim Fitzsimmons	Gordon J. McCann	Windfields Farm	1:43.40	
1960	Chic Miss	3	John R. Adams	Frank H. Merrill Jr.	Roxie Gian & Tosch	1:46.00	
1959	Sword Woman	3	Don Hale	A. H. Routcliffe	Pine Tree Stable	1:47.20	
1958	Kitty Girl	4	Roberto Gonzalez	Yonnie Starr	L. Maloney & C. Smythe	1:47.40	
1957	Kitty Girl	3	Herb Lindberg	Yonnie Starr	L. Maloney / C. Smythe	1:47.60	
1956	Flying Trapeze	3	Vic Bovine	Arthur H. Warner	Lanson Farm	1:45.60	

== See also ==
- List of Canadian flat horse races
