= H. Graham Motion =

American horse trainer

Personal information
- Born: May 22, 1964 (age 62) Cambridge, England
- Occupation: Trainer

Horse racing career
- Sport: Horse racing
- Career wins: 2,885+ (ongoing)

Major racing wins
- Dixie Stakes (2003, 2006); Manhattan Handicap (2007, 2017, 2018); Sword Dancer Handicap (2004, 2005); United Nations Handicap (2005); Man o' War Stakes (2005, 2022); Queen Elizabeth II Challenge Cup Stakes (2003); Gallorette Stakes (2005); Federico Tesio Stakes (2008); Private Terms Stakes (2001); Knickerbocker Handicap (2003); Barbaro Stakes (1995, 1997, 2000); Hilltop Stakes (1996); The Very One Stakes (2001); William Donald Schaefer Handicap (1996); Woodlawn Stakes (1997, 2000); Maryland Million Ladies (1998, 2008); Lexington Stakes (1999); Maryland Million Lassie (2000, 2001); Maryland Million Nursery (1996, 2005); Maryland Million Day (1998); Sky Classic Stakes (2005, 2016); Remington Springboard Mile Stakes (2009); Whitney Handicap (2009); Garden City Stakes (2010); Matriarch Stakes (2010); Hollywood Turf Cup Stakes (2011); Spinster Stakes (2011); Wood Memorial (2011); Del Mar Oaks (2011, 2022); Dubai World Cup (2013); Rodeo Drive Stakes (2015); Frank E. Kilroe Mile Stakes (2015); Alcibiades Stakes (2016); Shadwell Turf Mile Stakes (2016); Beverly D. Stakes (2026); E. P. Taylor Stakes (2026); Willa On the Move Stakes (2019) Breeders' Cup wins: Breeders' Cup Turf (2004); Breeders' Cup Filly and Mare Turf (2010); Breeders' Cup Turf (2014); Breeders' Cup Juvenile Fillies Turf (2019) American Classics wins: Kentucky Derby (2011)

Racing awards
- Big Sport of Turfdom Award (2011)

Significant horses
- Adriano, Animal Kingdom, Bay Eagle, Better Talk Now, Chilito, Dr. Brendler, Equality, Film Maker, Icabad Crane, Irish War Cry, Main Sequence, Pluck, Shared Account, Went The Day Well, Your Out
- Updated on 22 August 2022

H. Graham Motion (born May 22, 1964) is an American horse trainer notable for his work with 2011 Kentucky Derby–winner Animal Kingdom and Better Talk Now. Motion started out training and winning with his own Thoroughbred horses at age 29, and his first win was with Bounding Daisy in March 1993 at Laurel Park Racecourse. Graham's father worked as a bloodstock agent. He worked for Johnathan Sheppard as an assistant trainer from 1985 through 1990. He then worked as an assistant under trainer Bernie Bond in 1991, then assumed Bond's stable when the trainer retired after 1992. Motion now lives in Fair Hill, Maryland.

== Trainer standings ==
Motion finished in the top ten of all Maryland conditioners nine times, including seven straight years from 1995 through 2001. He led all trainers with five stakes wins in the 2008 Pimlico spring meet. He won his 1,000th race at Laurel Park Racecourse on November 6, 2006. In 1997 he finished with a career-best 150 races won. In 2008, Motion finished in the top twelve trainers in earnings nationally with over $6,900,000.
