= Queen Elizabeth II Challenge Cup Stakes =

Queen Elizabeth II Challenge Cup
- Class: Grade I
- Location: Keeneland Race Course; Lexington, Kentucky, United States
- Inaugurated: 1984
- Race type: Thoroughbred – Flat racing
- Sponsor: Dixiana Farm (2020)
- Website: Keeneland

Race information
- Distance: 1 1/8 miles
- Surface: Turf
- Track: Left-handed
- Qualification: Three-year-old fillies
- Weight: 121 lbs.
- Purse: $800,000 (since 2025)

The Queen Elizabeth II Challenge Cup Stakes is a Grade I American thoroughbred horse race for three-year-old fillies over a distance of one and one-eighth miles on the turf held annually in October at Keeneland Race Course in Lexington, Kentucky during the fall meeting.

== History ==
The race was inaugurated on October 11, 1984, in honour of the British monarch, Queen Elizabeth II, who attended the Keeneland races, during her private visit to Central Kentucky, and who presented a trophy on that date. The event was held on the dirt track over a distance of 1 1/16 miles with Sintra winning in a time of 1:43 2/5.

The following year the event was moved to the turf track.

The Queen Elizabeth II Challenge Cup was a Listed race in 1984 and 1985, and was upgraded to Grade III status in 1986. The event held this status for two runnings and was upgraded to Grade II. In 1991 was upgraded once more to Grade I.

It is an important prep race to the Breeders' Cup Filly & Mare Turf.

== Records ==
Time record:

- 1 1/8 miles: 1:45.81 – Memories of Silver (1996)
- 1 1/16 miles: 1:43.20 - Graceful Darby (1987)

Margins:

- 6 lengths – She Feels Pretty (2024)

Most wins by an owner

- 2 – Henryk de Kwiatkowski (1985, 1986)
- 2 – Darby Dan Farm (1988, 1990)
- 2 – Stronach Stables (1999, 2000)

Most wins by a jockey

- 4 – John R. Velazquez (1995, 2008, 2014, 2016, 2019, 2024)

Most wins by a trainer

- 5 – Chad C. Brown (2012, 2018, 2019, 2021, 2022)

== Winners ==
Year	Winner	Jockey	Trainer	Owner	Distance	Time	Purse	Grade	Ref
2026	Tam Tam	Junior Alvarado	Philip A. Bauer	Rigney Racing	1 1/8 miles	1:49.91	$750,000	I	
2025	Lush Lips (GB)	Tyler Gaffalione	Brendan P. Walsh	Medallion Racing, Parkland Thoroughbreds, Hoffman Thoroughbreds, Mrs. Paul Shanahan & Mrs. M.V. Magnier	1 1/8 miles	1:48.01	$665,300	I	
2024	She Feels Pretty	John R. Velazquez	Cherie DeVaux	Lael Stables (Roy & Gretchen Jackson)	1 1/8 miles	1:46.50	$719,375	I	
2023	Mawj (IRE)	Oisin Murphy	Saeed bin Suroor	Godolphin	1 1/8 miles	1:48.06	$501,000	I	
2022	Gina Romantica	Flavien Prat	Chad C. Brown	Peter M. Brant	1 1/8 miles	1:48.20	$569,125	I	
2021	Shantisara (IRE)	Flavien Prat	Chad C. Brown	Michael Dubb, Madaket Stables & Robert V. LaPenta	1 1/8 miles	1:48.86	$500,000	I	
2020	Harvey's Lil Goil	Martin Garcia	William I. Mott	Harvey A. Clarke (Estate) & Paul Braverman	1 1/8 miles	1:48.72	$500,000	I	
2019	Cambier Parc	John R. Velazquez	Chad C. Brown	OXO Equine	1 1/8 miles	1:49.54	$500,000	I	
2018	Rushing Fall	Javier Castellano	Chad C. Brown	e Five Racing Thoroughbreds	1 1/8 miles	1:50.42	$500,000	I	
2017	La Coronel	Jose Lezcano	Mark E. Casse	John C. Oxley	1 1/8 miles	1:48.99	$500,000	I	
2016	Time and Motion	John R. Velazquez	James J. Toner	Phillips Racing Partnership	1 1/8 miles	1:50.24	$500,000	I	
2015	Her Emmynency	Florent Geroux	Michael Stidham	Dawn & Ike Thrash	1 1/8 miles	1:48.84	$500,000	I	
2014	Crown Queen	John R. Velazquez	William I. Mott	Besilu Stables	1 1/8 miles	1:49.98	$500,000	I	
2013	Kitten's Dumplings	Julien R. Leparoux	Michael J. Maker	Kenneth and Sarah Ramsey	1 1/8 miles	1:48.43	$400,000	I	
2012	Dayatthespa	Javier Castellano	Chad C. Brown	Jerry & Ronald Frankel, Steve Laymon & Bradley Thoroughbreds	1 1/8 miles	1:48.99	$400,000	I	
2011	Together (IRE)	Colm O'Donoghue	Aidan P. O'Brien	Derrick Smith, Mrs. John Magnier & Michael Tabor	1 1/8 miles	1:48.83	$400,000	I	
2010	Harmonious	Joel Rosario	John Shirreffs	Martin, Pam, & Emily Wygods	1 1/8 miles	1:49.14	$400,000	I	
2009	Hot Cha Cha	James Graham	Philip A. Sims	Nelson McMakin	1 1/8 miles	1:53.09	$500,000	I	
2008	Alwajeeha	John R. Velazquez	Kiaran P. McLaughlin	Shadwell Stable	1 1/8 miles	1:48.09	$500,000	I	
2007	Bit of Whimsy	Javier Castellano	Barclay Tagg	Joyce B. Young & Gerald McManis	1 1/8 miles	1:48.73	$500,000	I	
2006	Vacare	Carlos H. Marquez Jr.	Chris M. Block	Lothenbach Stables	1 1/8 miles	1:48.42	$500,000	I	
2005	Sweet Talker	Rafael Bejarano	Helen Pitts-Blasi	Eliah & Lisa Kahn	1 1/8 miles	1:51.20	$500,000	I	
2004	Ticker Tape (GB)	Kent J. Desormeaux	James M. Cassidy	Jim Ford, Deron Pearson & Jack Sweesy	1 1/8 miles	1:51.35	$500,000	I	
2003	Film Maker	Edgar S. Prado	H. Graham Motion	Courtlandt Farm	1 1/8 miles	1:47.82	$500,000	I	
2002	Riskaverse	Mark Guidry	Patrick J. Kelly	Fox Ridge Farm (Peter G. Schiff)	1 1/8 miles	1:49.84	$500,000	I	
2001	Affluent	Eddie Delahoussaye	Ron McAnally	Janis R. Whitham	1 1/8 miles	1:50.03	$500,000	I	
2000	Collect the Cash	Shane Sellers	Joe Orseno	Stronach Stables	1 1/8 miles	1:47.94	$500,000	I	
1999	Perfect Sting	Pat Day	Joe Orseno	Stronach Stables	1 1/8 miles	1:50.66	$500,000	I	
1998	Tenski	Richard Migliore	Linda L. Rice	Richard L. Golden	1 1/8 miles	1:48.54	$400,000	I	
1997	Ryafan	Alex O. Solis	John Gosden	Juddmonte Farms	1 1/8 miles	1:46.64	$400,000	I	
1996	Memories of Silver	Robbie Davis	James J. Toner	Joan G. & John W. Phillips	1 1/8 miles	1:45.81	$400,000	I	
1995	Perfect Arc	John R. Velazquez	Angel A. Penna Jr.	Brazil Stables	1 1/8 miles	1:48.84	$250,000	I	
1994	Danish (IRE)	Julie Krone	Christophe Clement	Harry McCalmont	1 1/8 miles	1:49.89	$200,000	I	
1993	Tribulation	Jean-Luc Samyn	James J. Toner	James W. Phillips & G. Arthur Seelbinder	1 1/8 miles	1:53.62	$200,000	I	
1992	Captive Miss	Julie Krone	Philip M. Serpe	Zeke Minassian	1 1/8 miles	1:48.66	$200,000	I	
1991	La Gueriere	Brian Dale Peck	A. Peter Perkins	Wimborne Farm	1 1/8 miles	1:49.86	$200,000	I	
1990	Plenty of Grace	Jerry D. Bailey	John M. Veitch	Darby Dan Farm	1 1/8 miles	1:51.40	$100,000	II	
1989	Coolawin	Jose A. Velez Jr.	Carl A. Nafzger	James B. Tafel	1 1/16 miles	1:43.20	$100,000	II	
1988	Love You by Heart	Randy Romero	John M. Veitch	Darby Dan Farm	1 1/16 miles	1:44.80	$100,000	II	
1987	Graceful Darby	Jerry D. Bailey	John M. Veitch	James W. Phillips	1 1/16 miles	1:47.20	$100,000	III	
1986	Lotka	Walter Guerra	Woodford C. Stephens	Henryk de Kwiatkowski	1 1/16 miles	1:50.00	$100,000	III	
1985	Contredance	Eddie Maple	Woodford C. Stephens	Henryk de Kwiatkowski	1 1/16 miles	1:47.00	$85,550		
1984	Sintra	Keith Allen	Steven Penrod	Cherry Valley Farm	1 1/16 miles	1:43.40	$106,625		

Legend:
Dirt Turf

== See also ==
- List of American and Canadian Graded races
