= List of graded stakes at Pimlico Race Course =

Stakes Races held at Pimlico Race Course, each year in Baltimore, Maryland.

Grade I Stakes:	Year Inaugurated
Preakness Stakes	1873
Grade II Stakes:	
Black-Eyed Susan Stakes	1919
Dinner Party Stakes	1870
Grade III Stakes:	
Pimlico Special Handicap	1937
Allaire duPont Stakes	1992
Chick Lang Stakes	1975
Gallorette Handicap	1952
Miss Preakness Stakes	1986
Maryland Sprint Stakes	1987
William Donald Schaefer Handicap	1994
Listed Stakes:
James W. Murphy Stakes	1966
Hilltop Stakes	1973
The Very One Stakes	1993
Skipat Stakes	1993
Henry S. Clark Stakes	2001
Jim McKay Turf Sprint	2006
