= Barbara Fritchie Handicap top three finishers =

This is a listing of the horses that finished in either first, second, or third place and the number of starters in the Barbara Fritchie Handicap (1952-present), a grade 2 American Thoroughbred Sprint race at seven furlongs run on dirt at Laurel Park Racecourse in Laurel, Maryland.

In 1982, 1984 and 1985 the race was run in two separate divisions; # signifies two divisions.

Year	Winner	Second	Third	Starters
2021	Hibiscus Punch	Estilo Talentoso	Club Car	8
2020	Majestic Reason	Victim of Love	Anna's Bandit	6
2019	Late Night Pow Wow	Spiced Perfection	Dawn the Destroyer	11
2018	Ms Locust Point	Moiety	Berned	11
2017	High Ridge Road	By the Moon	Clothes Fall Off	8
2016	Dance House	Clothes Fall Off	Lady Sabelia	7
2015	Lady Sabelia	Princess Violet	Expression	10
2014	My Wandy's Girl	La Verdad	Centrique	7
2013	Funnys Approval	My Wandy's Girl	Withgreatpleasure	10
2012	Magical Feeling	Nicole H.	C C's Pal	8
2011	Harissa	Aspenglow	Fascinatin' Rhythm	7
2010	Sweet Goodbye	Panoma Ball	Cuvee Uncorked	14
2009	Royale Michele	Seventh Street	Fascinatin' Rhythm	9
2008	Golden Dawn	Control System	For Kisses	9
2007	Oprah Winney	Silmaril	Smart and Fancy	10
2006	No Race	No Race	No Race	0
2005	Cativa	Sensibly Chic	Silmaril	10
2004	Bear Fan	Gazillion	Bronze Abe	9
2003	Xtra Heat †	Carson Hollow	Spelling	7
2002	Xtra Heat †	Prized Stamp	Kimbralata	8
2001	Prized Stamp	Superduper Miss	Tax Affair	6
2000	Tap to Music	Her She Kisses	Di's Time	13
1999	Passeggiata	Catinca	Nothing Special	8
1998	J J'sdream	Palette Knife	Stylish Encore	10
1997	Miss Golden Circle	Lottsa Talc	Whaleneck	12
1996	Lottsa Talc	Up an Eighth	Evil's Pic	14
1995	Smart 'N Noble	Dust Bucket	Gooni Goo Hoo	10
1994	Mixed Appeal	Known as Nancy	Winka	12
1993	Moon Mist	Ritchie Trail	Femma	9
1992	Wood So	Wide Country	Wait for the Lady	7
1991	Fappaburst	Devil's Orchid	Diva's Debut	10
1990	Amy Be Good	Channel Three	Banbury Fair	10
1989	Tappiano	Very Subtle	Tops in Taps	12
1988	Psyched	Spring Beauty	Kerygma	10
1987	Spring Beauty	Notches Trace	Pine Tree Lane	12
1986	Willowy Mood	Aerturas	Alabama Nana	10
1985 #	Dumdedumdedum	Kattegat's Pride	Sharp Little Girl	8
1985 #	Flip's Pleasure	Applause	Gene's Lady	8
1984 #	Pleasure Cay	Kattegat's Pride	Amanti	9
1984 #	Bara Lass	Owned by All	Willamae	8
1983	Stellarette	Hoist Emy's Flag	Cheap Seats	10
1982 #	Lady Dean	Sweet Revenge	Sinister Queen	10
1982 #	The Wheel Turns	Island Charm	Up the Flagpole	9
1981	Skipat	Whispy's Lass	Secret Emotion	8
1980	Misty Gallore	Gladiolus	Silver Ice	10
1979	Skipat	Pearl Necklace	The Very One	8
1978	Bold Brat	Spot Two	Satin Dancer	7
1977	Mt. Airy Queen	Avun	Forty Nine Sunsets	6
1976	Donetta	Pinch Pie	Heydairya	11
1975	Twixt	Crackerfax	Donetta	11
1974	Twixt	Groton Miss	In the Mattress	10
1973	First Bloom	Pas de Nom	Winged Affair	12
1972	no race	no race	no race	0
1971	Cold Comfort	Take Warning	Double Delta	n/a
1970	Process Shot	Serica	Kushka	n/a
1969	Too Bald	Miss Spin	Double Ripple	n/a
1968	Too Bald	Straight Deal II	Treacherous	n/a
1967	Holly-O.	Moccasin	Lady Diplomat	n/a
1966	Tosmah	Queen Empress	Privileged	n/a
1965	Basking	Redpoll	County Maid	n/a
1964	Pam's Ego	Vitamin Shot	Srta. Monica	n/a
1963	All Brandy	Coppahaunk	Think Piece	n/a
1962	Call Card	Sun Glint	Basking	n/a
1961	Sun Glint	Cherry Flip	Miss Orestes	n/a
1960	no race	no race	no race	0
1959	Tinkalero	Mlle. Dianne	Hoosier Honey	n/a
1958	Motivate	Gay Warbler	Derry	n/a
1957	Solar System	Scansion	Cool Stream	n/a
1956	Sometime Thing	Searching	Myrtle's Jet	n/a
1955	Guayana	Another World	Cerise Reine	n/a
1954	Sotto Voce	Mlle. Loretta	Canadiana	n/a
1953	Sunshine Nell	La Corredora	Sunny Dale	n/a
1952	Singing Beauty	My Nell	Chalalette	n/a

† designates an American Champion or Eclipse Award winner.
