= All Brandy Stakes =

- Class: Ungraded stakes
- Location: Laurel Park Racecourse, Laurel, Maryland, United States
- Inaugurated: 1970
- Race type: Thoroughbred - Flat racing
- Website: www.laurelpark.com

Race information
- Distance: 1 1/8 miles (9 furlongs)
- Surface: Turf
- Track: Left-handed
- Qualification: Three-year-olds & Up; Fillies and Mares
- Weight: Assigned
- Purse: $100,000

The All Brandy Stakes is an American Thoroughbred horse race held annually in autumn, usually in November, at Laurel Park Racecourse in Laurel, Maryland. It is open to fillies and mares three years old and up and is raced on turf at a distance of 1-1/8 miles (9 furlongs).

The race was named in honor of the Maryland-Bred Champion All Brandy, who was named Champion three-year-old filly in 1962. She was bred by John A. Manfuso Sr. the former owner of the Maryland Jockey Club. Manfuso rated her as the best racehorse he had bred in over 50 years in the business. Born in 1959, All Brandy was sired by Double Brandy and out of Alluring. She had career earnings of $85,943, winning the Barbara Fritchie Handicap, Mermaid Stakes, Monumental Stakes and Eastern Shore Stakes and placed in three other stakes races. Although none off her offspring performed well at the track, All Brandy was the granddam of 1981 Maryland champion two-year-old colt A Magic Spray, who earned over $470,000. All Brandy was euthanized due to infirmities of old age at her breeder's Osufnam Farm in 1987 at the age of 28.

The race was taken off the Turf and run on the dirt track due to weather conditions on three occasions; 1970, 1993 and 2004.

== Records ==
Speed record:

- 1 mile - 1:46.40 - Proud Run (1999)
- 1-1/8 miles - 1:35.20 - Phoebe's Fancy (1980)

Most wins by a jockey:

- 3 - Leroy Moyers (1975, 1977, 1981)

Most wins by a trainer:

- 3 - Richard W. Small (1994, 1996, 2006)
- 3 - Ronald Cartwright (1993, 1995, 2005)

== Winners of the All Brandy Stakes since 1970 ==
Year	Winner	Age	Jockey	Trainer	Owner	Dist. (Miles)	Time	Purse
2018	Race not held							
2017	Race not held							
2016	Race not held							
2015	Joy	3	Julien Pimentel	H. Graham Motion	Dark Hollow Farm	1-1/8	1:49.39	$60,000
2014	Vielsalm	5	Julien Pimentel	Dylan Smith	Brooke Bowman	1-1/8	1:49.88	$125,000
2013	Race not held							
2012	Charged Cotton	3	Horatio Karamanos	Ignacio Correas	Sagamore Farm	1-1/8	1:47.05	$100,000
2011	Race not held							
2010	Blind Date	4	Eric D. Rodriguez	Hamilton A. Smith	William M. Backer	1-1/16	1:38.02	$50,000
2009	Love's Blush	3	Travis Dunkelberger	Rodney Jenkins	Richard Golden	1-1/8	1:52.65	$50,000
2008	Sales Tax	3	Travis Dunkelberger	Hamilton A. Smith	William M. Backer	1-1/8	1:51.08	$50,000
2007	Datts Awesome	3	Abel Castellano	Mark Hennig	Datt Stable/T. Ryan	1-1/8	1:53.60	$50,000
2006	Sticky	4	Jozbin Z. Santana	Richard W. Small	Fitzhugh, LLC	1-1/8	1:50.60	$75,000
2005	Larrupin Gal	4	Ryan Fogelsonger	Ronald Cartwright		1-1/8	1:49.40	$50,000
2004	True Sensation	5	Eric D. Rodriguez	Hamilton A. Smith	Hickory Plains Farm	1-1/8	1:53.00	$75,000
2003	Cruise Along	-	Horatio Karamanos	Lawrence E. Murray		1-1/8	1:51.20	$75,000
2002	Sneaks	5	Horatio Karamanos	Ann W. Merryman	Richard Blue Jr.	1-1/8	1:50.20	$75,000
2001	Jazz	5	Ramon Dominguez	Barclay Tagg		1-1/8	1:52.00	$75,000
2000	Crafty Toast	3	Ramon Dominguez	Bruce C. Jackson		1-1/8	1:50.60	$75,000
1999	Proud Run	3	Mark Johnston	Richard J. Hendricks		1-1/8	1:46.40	$75,000
1998	Absolutely Queenie	5	Robby Albarado	Bessie Gruwell	Sondra D. Bender	1-1/8	1:49.00	$75,000
1997	Absolutely Queenie	4	Robby Albarado	Bessie Gruwell	Sondra D. Bender	1-1/8	1:49.60	$75,000
1996	Brushing Gloom	4	Juan L. Umana	Richard W. Small		1-1/8	1:56.20	$75,000
1995	Mz. Zill Bear	6	Steve D. Hamilton	Ronald Cartwright	Mea Culpa Stable	1-1/8	1:48.00	$75,000
1994	Tennis Lady	4	Andrea Seefeldt	Richard W. Small	Chapel Royal	1-1/8	1:52.00	$75,000
1993	Mz. Zill Bear	4	Steve D. Hamilton	Ronald Cartwright	Mea Culpa Stable	1-1/8	1:51.60	$75,000
1992	Brilliant Brass	5	Edgar Prado	Carlos A. Garcia	Marshele Bassford Heffron	1-1/8	1:49.80	$75,000
1991	Wide Country	3	Santos Chavez	Robert W. Camac	Tommy Tanner	1-1/8	1:49.40	$75,000
1990	Double Bunctious	-	Mario Pino			1-1/8	1:52.80	$75,000
1989	Smart 'n Quick	-	Kent Desormeaux			1-1/8	1:52.40	$75,000
1988	Thirty Eight Go Go	-	Kent Desormeaux			1-1/8	1:50.20	$80,000
1987	Angelina Country	-	Donald A. Miller Jr.			1-1/8	1:49.80	$60,000
1986	A Joyful Spray	-	Larry Saumell			1-1/8	1:50.60	$60,000
1985	Squan Song	-	Larry Saumell			1-1/8	1:51.60	$60,000
1984	Kattegat's Pride	-	Vincent Bracciale Jr.			1 mile	1:37.80	$30,000
1983	Sea Siren	-	Vincent Bracciale Jr.			1 mile	1:36.60	$30,000
1982	Jangleno	-	J. D. Prough			1 mile	1:38.00	$35,000
1981	Contrary Rose	-	Leroy Moyers			1 mile	1:39.60	$30,000
1980	Phoebe's Fancy	-	Joe Imparato			1 mile	1:35.20	$30,000
1979	Debby's Turn	-	Mario Pino			1 mile	1:37.60	$30,000
1978	Debby's Turn	-	Greg McCarron			1 mile	1:38.60	$30,000
1977	Moonlight Jig	-	Leroy Moyers			1 mile	1:39.60	$25,000
1976	Gala Lil	-	George Cusimano			1 mile	1:36.40	$25,000
1975	Gala Lil	-	Leroy Moyers			1 mile	1:38.20	$25,000
1974	Sailingon	-	Anthony Agnello			1 mile	1:37.80	$20,000
1973	Twixt	-	William J. Passmore			1 mile	1:36.80	$20,000
1972	Wakefield Miss	-	John Ruane			1 mile	1:40.20	$25,000
1971	Alma North	-	Frank Lovato			1 mile	1:37.20	$25,000
1970	Tsip	-	Arnulfo Haldar			1 mile	1:37.40	$20,000

== See also ==
- All Brandy Stakes top three finishers
