= Wide Country =

Wide Country may refer to:

- Wide Country (horse), an American Thoroughbred racehorse
- Wide Country (TV series), an American Western television series
- Wide Country Stakes, an American Thoroughbred horse race, named for the horse
