= Wide Country Stakes =

- Class: Ungraded Stakes
- Location: Laurel Park Racecourse, Laurel, Maryland, United States
- Inaugurated: 1994
- Race type: Thoroughbred - Flat racing
- Website: www.laurelpark.com

Race information
- Distance: 7 furlongs
- Surface: Dirt
- Track: left-handed
- Qualification: Fillies; Three-years-old
- Weight: Assigned
- Purse: $100,000

The Wide Country Stakes is an American Thoroughbred horse race held annually in March at Laurel Park Racecourse in Laurel, Maryland. The race is open to fillies age three and up over seven furlongs on the dirt. It was run for the 23rd time in 2015.

An ungraded stakes race, it currently offers a purse of $100,000. The race was named in honor of the 1991 Maryland-bred "Horse of the Year, Wide Country. Tom Tanner's home bred, Wide Country compiled a nine-race win streak (all stakes races at either Pimlico Race Course or Laurel Park Racecourse). The streak began in the final months of 1990 when the chestnut filly won the Grade 2 Black-Eyed Susan Stakes over a muddy race track after losing a shoe. She also won the Grade 3 Pimlico Oaks by eight and a half lengths. Wide Country shipped to Belmont Park and Meadowlands during that campaign and placed second in graded stakes company in both cases. Trained by Robert W. Camac, she captured three straight Maryland stakes races on her way to state-bred championship honors. She retired with a record of 20 wins or placings in 26 starts for career earnings of $881,221.

== Records ==
Speed record:

- 7 furlongs - 1:22.78 - Saarlight (2008)
- 7.5 furlongs - 1:30.80 - Norstep (1995)
- 1 mile - 1:40.00 - Bare Dancer (2007)

Most wins by a jockey:

- 3 - Mark T. Johnston (1995, 1996, & 2000)

Most wins by a trainer:

- 2 - Kiaran McLaughlin (2008 & 2009)

== Winners of the Wide Country Stakes since 1994 ==
Year	Winner	Age	Jockey	Trainer	Owner	Distance	Time	Purse
2018		3				7 fur.	0:00.00	$100,000
2017	Enchanted Ghost	3	Angel Cruz	Hamilton Smith	Mens Grille Racing	7 fur.	1:25.49	$100,000
2017	China Grove	3	Kendrick Karamanos	Ben Colebrook	Katherine G. Ball	7 fur.	1:23.86	$100,000
2016	Great Soul	3	Trevor McCarthy	Timothy L. Keefe	Steve Long	7 fur.	1:27.73	$75,000
2015	Gypsy Judy	3	Horacio Karamanos	Robin L. Graham	James Hibbert	7 fur.	1:25.75	$100,000
2014	Taris	3	Clinton L. Potts	Todd M. Beattie	Commonwealth New Era R.	7 fur.	1:24.71	$100,000
2013	Walkwithapurpose	3	Jeremy Rose	Ignacio Correas	Sagamore Farm	7 fur.	1:27.04	$125,000
2012	Millionreasonswhy	3	Horacio Karamanos	Ignacio Correas	Sagamore Farm	7 fur.	1:24.08	$100,000
2011	Red's Round Table	3	Sheldon Russell	Tim Keefe	Arnold Heft	7 fur.	1:25.99	$55,000
2010	Jim's Prospect	3	Vladimir Diaz	John B. Secor	Estate of James Glenn	7 fur.	1:24.67	$70,000
2009	Saarlight	3	Ray Fuentes	Kiaran McLaughlin	Cam Allard	7 fur.	1:22.78	$60,000
2008	Armonk	3	Julian Pimentel	Kiaran McLaughlin	Jeff Singer	7 fur.	1:26.63	$50,000
2007	Bare Dancer	3	Dyn Panell	Gary Contessa	Darlene Bilinski	1 mile	1:40.00	$90,000
2006	Celestial Legend	3	Erick D. Rodriguez	Dale Capuano	R. Shultz & D. Menard	1 mile	1:41.40	$75,000
2005	Amazing Buy	3	Norberto Arroyo	Jennifer Pederson	Paraneck Stable	1 mile	1:40.60	$50,000
2004	He Loves Me	3	Jozbin Santana	Richard W. Small	Buckingham Farm	1-1/16	1:47.20	$35,000
2003	Powers Prospect	3	Roberto Alvarado	Cathal A. Lynch	D'Arrigo Racing Stable	1-1/16	1:44.80	$50,000
2002	Shop Till You Drop	3	Harry Vega	John Fee	Dewey White	1-1/16	1:46.80	$36,000
2001	Strike It Up	3	Mario Pino	Anthony W. Dutrow		1-1/8	1:50.80	$55,000
2000	Case of the Blues	3	Mark T. Johnston	Hamilton A. Smith		1-1/8	1:52.40	$80,000
1999	Synchronized	3	Jose Espinoza	Martin Wansborough	John A. Franks	1-1/8	1:52.20	$55,000
1998	Cigar Charlie	3	Edgar Prado	Michael Dickinson		1-1/8	1:53.60	$55,000
1997	Salt It	3	Carlos Marquez	Deborah S. Bonder	Deborah S. Bonder	1-1/8	1:51.20	$30,000
1996	Hey Let's Dance	3	Mark T. Johnston	Jessica J. Campitelli		7.5 fur.	1:31.00	$30,000
1995 #	Quite Proper	3	Mario Verge	Leslie G. Glazier		7.5 fur.	1:32.20	$30,000
1995 #	Norstep	3	Mark T. Johnston	W. Robert Bailes		7.5 fur.	1:30.80	$30,000
1994	Brilliant Prospect	3	Allen Stacy	Carlos A. Garcia	Helmore Racing Partners	7.5 fur.	1:32.40	$30,000

== See also ==
- Wide Country Stakes top three finishers and starters
