= All Brandy Stakes top three finishers =

This is a listing of the horses that finished in either first, second, or third place and the number of starters in the All Brandy Stakes, an American Thoroughbred Stakes race for fillies and mares three years old and up at one and one eighth miles (9 furlongs) run on turf at Laurel Park Racecourse in Laurel, Maryland.

Year	Winner	Second	Third	Starters
2015	Joy	Vielsalm	Green Wave	10
2014	Vielsalm	Nashly's Vow	Joy	8
2013	No Race	No Race	No Race	0
2012	Charged Cotton	Grant Park	Daydreamin Gracie	10
2011	No Race	No Race	No Race	0
2010	Blind Date	Ask the Moon	Love’s Blush	7
2009	Love's Blush	Sweet Goodbye	Amie’s Legend	7
2008	Sales Tax	Ten Bolts	Miss Lombardi	12
2007	Datts Awesome	Dutch Girl	Ten Bolts	n/a
2006	Sticky	Rowdy	Frost Princess	n/a
2005	Larrupin Gal	Lucrezia	Rowdy	n/a
2004	True Sensation	River Cruise	Grace Bay	n/a
2003	Cruise Along	Coquettish	Leebearski	n/a
2002	Sneaks	Take It Off	Cruise Along	n/a
2001	Jazz	Maria's Tiara	Ginger's Proud	n/a
2000	Crafty Toast	Proud Run	Maria's Tiara	n/a
1999	Proud Run	Earth to Jackie	Maria's Tiara	n/a
1998	Absolutely Queenie	Proud Run	Earth to Jackie	n/a
1997	Absolutely Queenie	Tough Broad	Reeve's Lib	n/a
1996	Brushing Gloom	Tough Broad	Space Warning	n/a
1995	Mz. Zill Bear	Suspect Terrain	Churchbell Chimes	n/a
1994	Tennis Lady	Vaulted	Fly So High	n/a
1993	Mz. Zill Bear	Gammy's Alden	Tennis Lady	n/a
1992	Brilliant Brass	Gammy's Alden	Buffels	n/a
1991	Wide Country	Lucky Lady Lauren	Long Walk	n/a
1990	Double Bunctious	Mymet	Ismelda	n/a
1989	Smart 'n Quick	Under Oath	Misty Ivor	n/a
1988	Thirty Eight Go Go	Bristlin' Belle	Ice Tech	n/a
1987	Angelina Country	Smart 'n Quick	Bug Eyed Betty	n/a
1986	A Joyful Spray	Lady Loose	Alden's Ambition	n/a
1985	Squan Song	Final Chapter	Queen's Statue	n/a
1984	Kattegat's Pride	La Reine Elaine	Final Chapter	n/a
1983	Sea Siren	Enchanting Star	Final Chapter	n/a
1982	Jangleno	Tequilla Sheila	Have You	n/a
1981	Contrary Rose	Bishop's Ring	Phoebe's Fancy	n/a
1980	Phoebe's Fancy	Jameela	Caught in Amber	n/a
1979	Debby's Turn	Silver Ice	Nobulee	n/a
1978	Debby's Turn	Cycylya Zee	Gay Candy	n/a
1977	Moonlight Jig	Gay Candy	Vodka Talking	n/a
1976	Gala Lil	Avum	Shark's Jaws	n/a
1975	Gala Lil	Crackerfax	Chesapeake Bugeye	n/a
1974	Sailingon	Sarah Percy	Crooked Answer	n/a
1973	Twixt	Alma North	Naleesa	n/a
1972	Wakefield Miss	Naleesa	Gingermint	n/a
1971	Alma North	Tsip	Cherrybird	n/a
1970	Tsip	Paisley Square	Princess Poppy	n/a
