= Seattle Smooth =

American-bred Thoroughbred racehorse

- Sire: Quiet American
- Dam: Our Seattle Star
- Damsire: Seattle Song
- Sex: Mare
- Foaled: 2005
- Country: United States
- Colour: Dark Bay/Brown
- Breeder: Dr. Oscar Benavides and Darley Stud
- Owner: Calumet Farm
- Trainer: Anthony W. Dutrow
- Record: 13: 7-1-1
- Earnings: $971,160

Major wins
- Cotillion Handicap (2008); Bed O' Roses Handicap (2009); Shuvee Handicap (2009); Ogden Phipps Handicap (2009)

Seattle Smooth is a thoroughbred mare bred in Kentucky by Dr. Oscar Benavides in collaboration with Darley Stud. Seattle Smooth's dam is the unraced mare, Our Seattle Star, by Seattle Song who was bred to Quiet American; a Grade 1 winner by Fappiano who was in turn sired by the great Mr. Prospector. Being sired by Quiet American makes her-half sister to Kentucky Derby and Preakness Stakes winner Real Quiet, who lost the 1998 Triple Crown by a nose.

== Race career ==
Racing Manager, Dennis Yokum (buying on behalf of Mercedes Stables), purchased Seattle Smooth in the 2006 Fasig-Tipton July yearling sale for $340,000. As a three-year-old, Seattle Smooth defeated eventual Eclipse Award winner Proud Spell in the Grade II Cotillion Handicap. In 2009, the four-year-old Seattle Smooth came into her own, after Yokum switched her from the artificial surfaces of the West Coast to the dirt tracks of the East Coast. Major wins include G2 Bed O' Roses Handicap, G2 Shuvee Handicap, and she turned the tables on Seventh Street in the G1 Ogden Phipps Handicap.

She was retired in May 2010 after a second-place finish in the Grade 2 Shuvee Handicap due to "ankle problems."

== Broodmare career ==
Seattle Smooth has made a promising start as a producer with her 2013 stakes winner, Gunfire (by Tapit). For the first few years she lived at her owner's farm, Mercedes Stables LLC, producing a 2012 colt by Giant's Causeway, a 2014 colt again by Tapit and a 2015 unnamed filly by Giant's Causeway. She currently resides at Calumet Farm after being bought at auction in 2015 for $300,000; in foal to Malibu Moon.
