= Maryland Million Distaff Handicap top three finishers =

This is a listing of the horses that finished in either first, second, or third place and the number of starters in the Maryland Million Distaff Handicap, an American state-bred stakes race for fillies and mares three years old and older at seven furlongs on the dirt held at Laurel Park Racecourse in Laurel, Maryland. (List 1973-present)

Year	Winner	Second	Third	Starters
2020				-
2019	Anna's Bandit	Conjecture	Cee Bee Gee Bee	11
2018	Crabcakes	My Magician	Anna's Bandit	7
2017	Crabcakes	My Magician	She Rolls	9
2016	Rockin JoJo	Cee Bee Gee Bee	Lovable Lady	10
2015	Lionhearted Lady	Aix En Provence	My Magician	10
2014	Classy Coco	Steady N Love	Jonesin for Jerry	8
2013	Maddy's Dance	Anne's Smart Dancer	Ju Ju Eyeballs	7
2012	Bold Affair	Silver Heart	Brushed by Love	6
2011	Love That Dance	Silver Heart	Fools in Love	8
2010	Blind Date	Love That Dance	All Giving	8
2009	All Giving	Saxet Heights	Broad Bess	n/a
2008	Spectacular Malibu	All Giving	Jet Away Jane	n/a
2007	Akronism	Silmaril	For Kisses	n/a
2006	Silmaril	Yolanda B. Too	Immune to Gloom	n/a
2005	Valley of the Gods	Blind Canyon	Spirited Game	n/a
2004	Merryland Missy	Spirited Game	A Vision in Gray	n/a
2003	Willa On the Move	Finally Here	Bronze Abe	n/a
2002	Blinded by Love	Case of the Blues	Gracefulciti	n/a
2001	Case of the Blues	Summer Shenanigans	Trueytoo	n/a
2000	Tropical Punch	Silent Valay	Shortpoint	n/a
1999	Flippy Diane	Fine Wood	Truth and Nobility	n/a
1998	Weather Vane	Hip Wolf	Nice of You	n/a
1997	Secret Prospect	True Mystery	Conradley	n/a
1996	Heavenly Punch	I Am Me R. G.	Norstep	n/a
1995	Churchbell Chimes	Smart 'n Noble	Alcovy	n/a
1994	Alcovy	Ritchie Tail	Deputy Miss	n/a
1993	Star Minister	Wood So	Jazzy One	n/a
1992	Brilliant Brass	Hail Jody	Silver Tango	n/a
1991	Safely Kept	In the Curl	Wood So	n/a
1990	Safely Kept	Amy Be Good	Run Spot	n/a
1989	Safely Kept	In the Curl	Run Spot	n/a
1988	Dark Tzarina	Thirty Eight Go Go	In the Curl	n/a
1987	Ms. Rutledge	Edgar's Girl	In the Curl	n/a
1986	Capp It Off	Tulindas	Stay Home	n/a

== See also ==
- Maryland Million Distaff Handicap
- Maryland Million Day
- Laurel Park Racecourse
