= Miracle Wood Stakes top three finishers =

This is a listing of the horses that finished in either first, second, or third place and the number of starters in the Miracle Wood Stakes, an American stakes race for three-year-olds at one mile on dirt held at Laurel Park Racecourse in Laurel, Maryland. (List 1995–present)

Year	Winner	Second	Third	Starters
2020	Lebda	Mine Not Mine	Romanoff	9
2019	Alwaysmining	Gray Magician	Tybalt	6
2018	Still Having Fun	Old Time Revival	Wentz	7
2017	O Dionysus	Everybodyluvsrudy	No More Talk	8
2016	Marengo Road	Charmed Victory	Never Gone South	8
2015	Savvy Street	Combat Diver	Golden Years	6
2014	Extrasexyhippzster	Joint Custody	Mr. Rover	8
2013	Dynamic Strike	Where's Dominic	Lunar Rock	8
2012	The Lumber Guy	Brimstone Island	Rocky Gap	9
2011	J J's Lucky Train	Bandbox	Wicked Thunder	5
2010	Don't Blame the Cat	Regal Warrior	Cole T	11
2009	Rock On Justin	Shipwreckstreasure	Adduce	7
2008	Gattopardo	Apple Special	Cave's Valley	8
2007	Crafty Bear	Saratoga Lulaby	Place Your Bets	5
2006	Sweetnorthernsaint	Vegas Play	Sierra Quarum	10
2005	Malibu Moonshine	Legal Control	Seize	8
2004	Water Cannon	Eastern Bay	Wanaka	8
2003	Gimmeawink	Penobscot Bay	Gators N Bears	8
2002	No Race	No Race	No Race	0
2001	Talk Is Money	Marciano	Bay Eagle	n/a
2000	Connect	Tux	Colonial Delegate	n/a
1999	Ewer All Wet	Lead Em Home	Red Star Rose	n/a
1998	Mister Business	Spartan Cat	What a Dilemma	n/a
1997	South West Hostage	Cold Salute	Popcorn Pocket	n/a
1996	Game Quoit	Creative Tension	Rollicking Trick	n/a
1995	South Bend	Jane Knows Asecret	Game Quoit	n/a

== See also ==
- Miracle Wood Stakes
- Pimlico Race Course
