= Busher Stakes =

- Class: Listed
- Location: Aqueduct Racetrack; Jamaica, New York, USA
- Inaugurated: 1978
- Race type: Thoroughbred - Flat racing
- Website: New York Racing Association

Race information
- Distance: 1 mile (8 furlongs)
- Surface: Turf
- Track: Left-handed
- Qualification: Three-year-old fillies
- Purse: $125,000

The Busher Stakes is an American Thoroughbred stakes horse race for three-year-old fillies run each February at Aqueduct Race Track in Jamaica, New York and as of 2016 carries a purse of $125,000.

The Busher Handicap is named in honor of champion racing mare Busher, Champion Two Year Old Filly of 1944.

The race was run at 1 mile (8 furlongs in 1978 and 1979 and at a mile and an eighth (9 furlongs) from 1985 to 1992. It was not run in 1986 and 1987.

== Records ==
Speed Record:

At one mile (2018 to present):

1:37.69 - Espresso Shot (2019)

At one mile and one-sixteenth (1993 to 2017):

- 1:43.21 - It's Tricky (2011)

At one mile and an eighth (1985 to 1992):

- 1:50 - Kamikaze Rick (1985)
- 1:52 2/5 - I'm A Thriller (1991)
- 1:52 3/5 - Queen Of Triumph (1992)

Most wins by an owner:

- 2 - Christiana Stables (1978, 1979)

Most wins by a jockey:

- 2 - Aaron Gryder (1998, 2004)
- 2 - Angel Cordero Jr. (1981, 1985)
- 2 - Joe Bravo (1993, 2001)
- 2 - Jorge F. Chavez (1992, 1997)
- 2 - Norberto Arroyo Jr. (2000, 2005)
- 2 - Ruben Hernandez (1978, 1979)

Most wins by a trainer:

- 3 - John C. Kimmel (1995, 1997, 2001)
- 3 - Jorge R. Abreu (2019, 2022, 2024)

== Past Winners ==
Year	Winner	Jockey	Trainer	Owner	Time
2025	Drexel Hill	Ben Curtis	D.Whitworth Beckman	Legion Racing	1:41.46
2024	Jody’s Pride	Jose Lezcano	Jorge R. Abreu	Parkland Thoroughbreds and Sportsmen Stable	1:38.49
2023	Shidabhuti	Dylan Davis	Chad C. Brown	Peter M. Brant	1:39.03
2022	Venti Valentine	Manny Franco	Jorge R. Abreu	NY Final Furlong Racing Stable and Parkland Thoroughbreds	1:39.65
2021	Search Results	Javier Castellano	Chad C. Brown	Klaravich Stables	1:39.75
2019	Espresso Shot	Eric Canel	Jorge R. Abreu	NY Final Furlong Racing Stable, Maspeth Stables & Parkland Thoroughbreds	1:37.69
2018	Midnight Disguise	Trevor McCarthy	Linda L. Rice	Stepwise Farm	1:39.15
2017	Yorkiepoo Princess	Irad Ortiz Jr.	Edward Baker	Danny J. Chen	1:47.69
2016	Mo d'Amour	Christopher P. DeCarlo	Todd A. Pletcher	King of Prussia Stable	1:47.37
2015	Condo Commando	Junior Alvarado	Rudy R. Rodriguez	Michael Dubb, Bethlehem Stables & The Elkstone Group	1:46.52
2014	Joint Return	Kendrick Carmouche	John Servis	Main Line Racing Stable	1:48.49
2013	Princess of Sylmar	Javier Castellano	Todd A. Pletcher	King of Prussia Stable	1:45.52
2012	Sweet Seventeen	Alan Garcia	H. Graham Motion	Debby M. Oxley	1:46.05
2011	It's Tricky	Eddie Castro	Kiaran McLaughlin	Darley Stable	1:43.21
2010	Roman Chestnut	Angel Serpa	Leah Gyarmati	Ellen O'Connell	1:45.93
2009	What a Pear	Channing Hill	Joseph Parker	Tri-Bone Stables	1:45.17
2008	Little Belle	Rajiv Maragh	Kiaran McLaughlin	Durley Stable	1:44.32
2007	Olivine	Chuck C. Lopez	David Donk	Dileo Punk	1:44.76
2006	Regal Engagement	Ramon Dominguez	Tom Bush	Mark Spitzer	1:47.15
2005	Amazing Buy	Norberto Arroyo Jr.	Jennifer Pedersen	Paraneck Stable	1:44.60
2004	Fond	Aaron Gryder	George Weaver	Dogwood Stable	1:44.80
2003	Elegant Designer	Mario Pino	Anthony W. Dutrow	Michael H. Sherman	1:45.20
2002	Bema	Javier Castellano	Claude R. McGaughey III	Claiborne Farm	1:45.80
2001	Diversa	Joe Bravo	John C. Kimmel	December Hill Farm	1:45.60
2000	Shopping for Love	Norberto Arroyo Jr.	Kenneth A. Nesky	Donald J. George & Dennis J. d'Arcangelo	1:43.80
1999	Synchronized	Jose Espinoza	Martin Warnsborough	George Yemec	1:44.80
1998	Best Friend Stro	Aaron Gryder	Michael E. Hushion	Eugene E. Hauman	1:46.00
1997	Glory in Motion	Jorge F. Chavez	John C. Kimmel	Kentucky Blue Stables	1:46.00
1996	Mackie	Joe Bravo	W. Elliott Walden	Walden Vanmeter	1:45.80
1995	Ammy Hils	Mike Luzzi	John C. Kimmel	Be Stables	1:46.20
1994	Forcing Bid	Filberto Leon	Del W. Carroll II	Hassan Shoaib	1:45.80
1993	True Affair	Joe Bravo	Gary C. Contessa	Winbound Farms	1:44.20
1992	Queen Of Triumph	Jorge Chavez	Alfredo Callejas	Robert Perez	1:52.60
1991	I'm A Thriller	Art Madrid, Jr.	Michael J. Kelly	Adele L. Rand	1:52.40
1990	My Girl Jeannie	James Bruin	William V. Terrill	Hugh Keith	1:55.20
1989	Dreamy Mimi	Richard Migliore	George R. Arnold II	A. G. Campbell, Jr.	1:53.60
1988	Fulbright Scholar	José A. Santos	D. Wayne Lukas	J. Anthony Forstmann	1:53.40
1985	Kamikaze Rick	Angel Cordero Jr.	John Parisella	Theodore Sabarese	1:50.00
1984	Squan Song	Herb McCauley	Carlos A. Garica	Robert E. Brennan	1:43.40
1983	Far Flying	Jean-Luc Samyn	Michael Kay	G. Watts Humphrey, Jr.	1:44.60
1982	Mochila	Michael Venezia	Jan H. Nerud	John A. Nerud	1:43.40
1981	Andover Way	Angel Cordero Jr.	Howard M. Tesher	H. Joseph Allen	1:41.80
1980	Wistful	Don Brumfield	Anthony Bardaro	Bright View Farm	1:41.80
1979	Croquis	Ruben Hernandez	James W. Maloney	Christiana Stables	1:38.60
1978	Tingle Stone	Ruben Hernandez	James W. Maloney	Christiana Stables	1:34.60
