= Twixt Stakes top three finishers and starters =

This is a listing of the horses that finished in either first, second, or third place and the number of starters in the Twixt Stakes, an American stakes race for fillies three years-old at 1 mile (8 furlongs) on the turf held at Laurel Park Racecourse in Laurel, Maryland. (List 1974-present)

Year	Winner	Second	Third	Starters
2011	Access to Charlie	Art of the Hunt	Brushed by Love	7
2010	Catch a Thief	Baltimore Belle	Brave as a Lion	6
2009	Five Diamonds	Love's Blush	Southern Charmer	11
2008	Hartigan	Pissarro	Inventive	8
2007	Paying Off	Welcome Inn	Ethan's Car	n/a
2006	Les Ry Leigh	Smart and Fancy	My Misty's Echo	n/a
2005	Promenade Girl	Magical Broad	Sticky	n/a
2004	He Loves Me	Richetta	Pour It On	n/a
2003	River Cruise	Coquettish	Grace Bay	n/a
2002	True Sensation	Tamayo	Ribbon Cane	n/a
2001	Your Out	Polish Hostess	Winter Leaf	n/a
2000	Steppedoutofadream	Blushing Broad	December Thunder	n/a
1999	Carnival Court	Perfect Challenge	La Reinette	n/a
1998	Merengue	Maragold Princess	Hair Spray	n/a
1997	Snit	G. O'Keefe	Truth and Nobility	n/a
1996	Proper Angel	Clamorosa	The Ruler's Sister	n/a
1995	Blue Sky Princess	Oh Summer	Fighting Countess	n/a
1994	Churchbell Chimes	Chestnut Angel	Love to Be Loved	n/a
1993	Broad Gains	Tennis Lady	Carnirainbow	n/a
1992	Star Minister	Gammy's Alden	Mz. Zill Bear	n/a
1991	Wide Country	Gala Goldilocks	John's Decision	n/a
1990	Valay Maid	Baltic Chill	Crowned	n/a
1989	Under Oath	Misty Ivor	Darlin Lindy	n/a
1988	Ice Tech	Fat and Foxy	Positively So	n/a
1987	Angelina County	Key Bid	Yampacala	n/a
1986	Smart 'n Quick	Afflatus	Azarbaijani	n/a
1985	No Race	No Race	No Race	0
1984	Slip of the Tongue	Eta Carinae	Alden's Ambition	n/a
1983	First Quad	Cojill	Her Donna	n/a
1982	Gallant Risk	Jove's Lady	Nordic Joy	n/a
1981	Dance Forth	Lying Lady	Hooverclubber	n/a
1980	Caught in Amber	Bishop's Ring	Andrea F.	n/a
1979	Lady Lyndy	Tote Em Up	Curlew's Cry	n/a
1978	Red Lamp	Danger Bearing	Run Em Up	n/a
