= Go For Wand Stakes =

- Class: Grade III
- Location: Aqueduct Racetrack; Ozone Park, New York, United States
- Inaugurated: 1954
- Race type: Thoroughbred – Flat racing

Race information
- Distance: 1 mile
- Surface: Dirt
- Track: left-handed
- Qualification: Fillies & Mares, three-years-old & up
- Weight: Base weights with allowances: 4-year-olds and up: 125 lbs. 3-year-olds: 122 lbs.
- Purse: US$200,000 (2024)

The Go For Wand Stakes is an American Thoroughbred horse race established in 1954 for fillies and mares age three and up. Raced in the fall, it is a Grade III race (Grade I before 2010) on dirt at a distance of one mile.

== History ==
Inaugurated in 1954 at Belmont Park as the Maskette Stakes in honor of the Hall of Fame filly, Maskette, it was renamed in 1992 for its ill-fated 1990 winner and Hall of Fame inductee, Go For Wand who is buried in the infield at Saratoga Race Course.

The Maskette took place at Aqueduct Racetrack in 1959, 1960, and from 1962 to 1968. From 1994–2009, the Go For Wand was hosted at the Saratoga Race Course. After not being raced in 2010, the Go For Wand Handicap returned to Aqueduct on November 25, 2011. The distance reverted to the mile distance the race was contested at prior to its move to Saratoga Race Course.

Since inception, the race has been contested at various distances:

- 1 mile (8 furlongs) : 1954–1981, 1983–1993, 2011-
- 7 furlongs : 1982
- 1 1/8 miles (9 furlongs) : 1994–2009

The race was run in two divisions in 1976.

This race was downgraded to a Grade III for its 2014 running.

== Records ==
Speed record:

- Lady's Secret – 1:33.60 (1986) (at current 8 furlong distance)

Most wins:

- 2 – Tempted (1958, 1960)
- 2 – Tosmah (1964, 1965)
- 2 – Lady's Secret (1985, 1986)
- 2 – Ginger Punch (2007, 2008)

Most wins by a jockey:

- 6 – Ángel Cordero Jr. (1967, 1970, 1972, 1979, 1987, 1991)

Most wins by a trainer:

- 6 – C. R. McGaughey III (1988, 1991, 1992, 1995, 1998, 2001)

Most wins by an owner:

- 5 – Ogden Phipps (1972, 1979, 1988, 1992, 1995)

== Winners ==
Year	Winner	Age	Jockey	Trainer	Owner	Time
2022	Dr B	4	Irad Ortiz Jr.	Robert E. Reid Jr.	Cash Is King LLC & LC Racing	1:35.18
2021	Lady Rocket	4	Irad Ortiz Jr.	Brad H. Cox	Frank Fletcher Racing Operations, Inc.	1:36.52
2020	Sharp Starr	3	José Ortiz	Horacio DePaz	Barry K. Schwartz	1:36.75
2019	Spiced Perfection	4	Javier Castellano	Peter Miller	Pantofel Stable, Wachtel Stable & Peter Deutsch	1:39.11
2018	Marley's Freedom	4	Mike E. Smith	Bob Baffert	Cicero Farms, LLC	1:37.50
2017	Indulgent	4	Luis Saez	Kiaran McLaughlin	Godolphin Racing LLC	1:37.75
2016	Highway Star	3	Angel S. Arroyo	Rodrigo A. Ubillo	Chester & Mary Broman	1:38.07
2015	Taris	4	Joel Rosario	Simon Callaghan	M. Tabor/S. Magnier/D. Smith	1:36.10
2014	Classic Point	5	Ángel Arroyo	James A. Jerkens	Joseph V. Shields Jr.	1:37.78
2013	Royal Lahaina	5	José Ortiz	Todd Pletcher	James A. Riccio	1:36.56
2012	Nefertini	4	Alan Garcia	Alan E. Goldberg	Robert E. Masterson	1:35.80
2011	Lovely Lil	4	Cornelio Velásquez	Michael Hushion	Barry K. Schwartz	1:36.90
2010	Not held					
2009	Seventh Street	4	Rajiv Maragh	Saeed bin Suroor	Godolphin Stables	1:51.01
2008	Ginger Punch	5	Rafael Bejarano	Robert J. Frankel	Stronach Stables	1:53.43
2007	Ginger Punch	4	Rafael Bejarano	Robert J. Frankel	Stronach Stables	1:49.19
2006	Spun Sugar	4	Mike Luzzi	Todd A. Pletcher	Stronach Stables	1:49.93
2005	Ashado	4	John Velazquez	Todd A. Pletcher	Starlight Stables LLC	1:50.30
2004	Azeri	6	Pat Day	D. Wayne Lukas	Allen E. Paulson Trust	1:47.86
2003	Sightseek	4	Jerry Bailey	Robert J. Frankel	Juddmonte Farms	1:50.92
2002	Dancethruthedawn	4	Jerry Bailey	Mark Frostad	Sam-Son Farms	1:50.21
2001	Serra Lake	4	Edgar Prado	Claude R. McGaughey III	Emory A. Hamilton	1:49.62
2000	Heritage Of Gold	5	Shane Sellers	Thomas M. Amoss	Jack Garey	1:49.84
1999	Banshee Breeze	4	Jerry Bailey	Carl Nafzger	Tafel/Jayeff B Stables	1:49.95
1998	Aldiza	4	Mike E. Smith	Claude R. McGaughey III	Alexander/Groves et al.	1:49.88
1997	Hidden Lake	4	Richard Migliore	John C. Kimmel	R. N. Clay/T. Farmer	1:49.60
1996	Exotic Wood	4	Chris McCarron	Ronald W. Ellis	Martin J. Wygod	1:49.44
1995	Heavenly Prize	4	Pat Day	Claude R. McGaughey III	Ogden Phipps	1:49.90
1994	Sky Beauty	4	Mike E. Smith	H. Allen Jerkens	Georgia Hofmann	1:49.47
1993	Turnback The Alarm	4	Chris Antley	William V. Terrill	Valley View Farm	1:36.13
1992	Easy Now	3	Jerry Bailey	Claude R. McGaughey III	Ogden Phipps	1:36.89
1991	Queena	5	Ángel Cordero Jr.	Claude R. McGaughey III	Emory A. Hamilton	1:34.80
1990	Go For Wand	3	Randy Romero	William Badgett Jr.	Christiana Stable	1:35.60
1989	Miss Brio	5	Jerry Bailey	Neil D. Drysdale	William S. Farish	1:35.60
1988	Personal Ensign	4	Randy Romero	Claude R. McGaughey III	Ogden Phipps	1:34.20
1987	North Sider	5	Ángel Cordero Jr.	D. Wayne Lukas	Paul Paternostro	1:35.00
1986	Lady's Secret	4	Jorge Velásquez	D. Wayne Lukas	Eugene V. Klein	1:33.60
1985	Lady's Secret	3	Jorge Velásquez	D. Wayne Lukas	Eugene V. Klein	1:34.00
1984	Miss Oceana	3	Eddie Maple	Woody Stephens	Newstead Farm	1:35.20
1983	Ambassador of Luck	4	Antonio Graell	Mitchell C. Preger	Envoy Stable	1:36.40
1982	Too Chic	3	Ruben Hernandez	James W. Maloney	E. G. Alexander	1:34.80
1981	Jameela	5	Jacinto Vásquez	Hyman Ravich	Mrs. Richard Worthington	1:35.00
1980	Bold 'n Determined	3	Eddie Delahoussaye	Neil D. Drysdale	Saron Stable	1:35.40
1979	Blitey	3	Ángel Cordero Jr.	Angel Penna Sr.	Ogden Phipps	1:34.80
1978	Pearl Necklace	4	Ruben Hernandez	Roger Laurin	Reginald N. Webster	1:33.80
1977	What A Summer	4	Jacinto Vásquez	LeRoy Jolley	Diana M. Firestone	1:37.40
1976	Artfully	3	Pat Day	Lucien Laurin	Reginald N. Webster	1:34.00
1976	Sugar Plum Time	4	Joseph Imparato	John W. Russell	Cynthia Phipps	1:34.00
1975	Let Me Linger	3	Laffit Pincay Jr.	Eddie Yowell	Oak Crest Stable	1:35.20
1974	Ponte Vecchio	4	Jacinto Vásquez	David A. Whiteley	William Haggin Perry	1:34.60
1973	Light Hearted	4	Eldon Nelson	Henry S. Clark	Christiana Stable	1:34.80
1972	Numbered Account	3	Ángel Cordero Jr.	Roger Laurin	Ogden Phipps	1:35.60
1971	Double Delta	4	Kenneth Knapp	Stanley M. Reiser	James Drymon	1:36.20
1970	Native Partner	4	Ángel Cordero Jr.	Frank I. Wright	Oxford Stable	1:36.20
1969	Singing Rain	4	Braulio Baeza	Oscar White	Walter M. Jeffords Jr.	1:38.00
1968	Amerigo Lady	4	Jorge Velásquez	J. Elliott Burch	Rokeby Stable	1:36.40
1967	Politely	4	Ángel Cordero Jr.	George M. Baker	Bohemia Stable	1:35.60
1966	Summer Scandal	4	Walter Blum	Woods Garth	Harborvale Stable	1:37.80
1965	Tosmah	4	Sam Boulmetis Sr.	Joseph Mergler	Briardale Farms	1:35.20
1964	Tosmah	3	Sam Boulmetis Sr.	Joseph Mergler	Briardale Farms	1:36.60
1963	Waltz Song	5	Sheridan Mellon	Thomas F. White	Thomas F. White	1:37.20
1962	Shirley Jones	6	Don Pierce	James W. Smith	Mrs. John O. Burgwin	1:36.00
1961	Teacation	4	Ray Broussard	Charles R. Parke	Fred W. Hooper	1:36.20
1960	Tempted	5	Eldon Nelson	Henry S. Clark	Mooring Stable	1:35.60
1959	Idun	4	Eric Guerin	Sherrill W. Ward	Josephine Bay Paul	1:36.00
1958	Tempted	3	Bobby Ussery	Henry S. Clark	Mooring Stable	1:36.40
1957	Bayou	3	Bobby Ussery	Moody Jolley	Claiborne Farm	1:37.00
1956	Searching	4	Conn McCreary	Hirsch Jacobs	Ethel D. Jacobs	1:37.00
1955	Oil Painting	4	Hedley Woodhouse	Anthony W. Rupelt	Mrs. J. A. Goodwin	1:36.60
1954	Ballerina	4	S. Small	Not found	Howell E. Jackson III	1:37.60

† In 1974, Desert Vixen finished first, but was later disqualified.
