= Wide Country Stakes top three finishers and starters =

This is a listing of the horses that finished in either first, second, or third place and the number of starters in the Wide Country Stakes (1994-present), an American Thoroughbred Stakes race for fillies age three years-old at seven furlongs run on dirt at Laurel Park Racecourse in Laurel, Maryland.

Year	Winner	Second	Third	Starters
2018	Enchanted Ghost	Dep Red	Aggregator	7
2017	China Grove	Crabcakes	Forever Liesl	8
2016	Great Soul	Prognosis	Clare's Dowrey	8
2015	Gypsy Judy	Hot City Girl	Diannestillworks	8
2014	Taris	Steady N Love	New Zone	7
2013	Walkwithapurpose	Power Lady	Dear to All	7
2012	Millionreasonswhy	Dance to Bristol	Officer's Holiday	7
2011	Red's Round Table	Sweet Susan	Heather	7
2010	Jim's Prospect	That’s How I Roll	Gator Prowl	8
2009	Saarlight	Strut the Canary	Haley’s Lollipop	8
2008	Armonk	Hartigan	Kosmo's Buddy	n/a
2007	Bare Dancer	Laila's Punch	Wow Me Free	n/a
2006	Celestial Legend	Cantora	Sea Pines	n/a
2005	Amazing Buy	Take a Check	Rutledge Ballado	n/a
2004	He Loves Me	Via Sacra	Pawyne Princess	n/a
2003	Powers Prospect	Blushing Valleys	Grace Bay	n/a
2002	Shop Till You Drop	Spelling	True Sensation	n/a
2001	Strike It Up	Sunshine In Paris	Sweep Dreams	n/a
2000	Case of the Blues	Zenith	Stateliness	n/a
1999	Synchronized	Mysterious Jak	Willow Place	n/a
1998	Cigar Charlie	Leave No Prints	Prima Neenya	n/a
1997	Salt It	Smart Erin	Suspicious Lady	n/a
1996	Hay Let's Dance	Dance for Jan	Colonial Review	n/a
1995 #	Norstep	Special Broad	Cal At Short	n/a
1995 #	Quite Proper	Crescent Park	Minnie's Brat	n/a
1994	Brilliant Prospect	Cherokee Wonder	Platinum Punch	n/a

A # designates that the race was run in two divisions in 1995.
