= Maryland Million Distaff Handicap =

- Class: Restricted State-bred Stakes
- Location: Laurel Park Racecourse; Laurel, Maryland, United States
- Inaugurated: 1986
- Race type: Thoroughbred - Flat racing
- Website: www.marylandthoroughbred.com/newsindex.php?articleid=953

Race information
- Distance: (7 furlongs)
- Surface: Dirt
- Track: left-handed
- Qualification: Three-year-olds and up
- Purse: $102,000

Maryland Million Distaff Handicap is an American Thoroughbred horse race held annually in October since 1986 primarily at Laurel Park Racecourse in Laurel, Maryland or at Pimlico Race Course in Baltimore. To be eligible for the Maryland Million Distaff Handicap, a filly or mare must be sired by a stallion who stands in Maryland. Due to that restriction the race is classified as a non-graded or "listed" stakes race and is not eligible for grading by the American Graded Stakes Committee.

The race is part of Maryland Million Day, a 12-race program held in mid October that was the creation of renowned television sports journalist Jim McKay. The "Maryland Million" is the first State-Bred showcase event ever created. Since 1986, 27 other events in 20 states have imitated the showcase and its structure.

From its inception in 1986 through 1992, 2001, 2002 and 2004 the race was run on dirt at a distance of six furlongs. Since 2004 it has been a 7 furlongs competition and currently offers a purse of $150,000.

In its 30th running in 2015, the race was restricted to those horses who were sired by a stallion who stands in the state of Maryland. Both the entrant horse and their stallion must be nominated to the Maryland Million program.

The race itself has had many titles since 1986 due in large part to the aggressive marketing efforts of Maryland Million Limited, the series' corporate founder. The race has been called many things starting from 1986 through 1988 and 1990 through 1992 it was known as the "State of Maryland Distaff Handicap." From 1993 through 1995 the race was called the "Port of Baltimore Distaff Handicap," from 1996 through 2001 the race was known as the "Maryland Department of Transportation Distaff Handicap." In 2002 the race was called the "Susquehanna Bank Disstaff Handicap," in 2006 it was known as the "Baltimore Examiner Distaff Handicap" and in 2007 the race was called the "Toyota Tundra Distaff Handicap."

== Records ==
Most wins horse:

- 3 - Safely Kept (1989, 1990, 1991)

Speed record:

- 7 furlongs: 1:21.84 - Hello Beautiful (2020)
- 6 furlongs: 1:10.00 - Safely Kept (1989)

Most wins by an owner:

- 2 - Jayeff B Stable
- 2 - Madaket Stables (2020, 2021)

Most wins by a jockey:

- 3 - Mario Pino

Most wins by a trainer:

- 3 - Alan E. Goldberg

== Winners of the Maryland Million Distaff Handicap since 1986 ==
Yr	Winner	Age	Jockey	Trainer	Owner	Dist.	Time	Purse
2025	Onyx Ten	3	Yedsit Hazlewood	Gary Capuano	Frank Sample	7 fur.	1:24.34	$102,030
2024	Foxy Junior	4	Jomar Torres	T. Bernard Houghton	Dianne Stern	7 fur.	1:23.86	$101,000
2023	Intrepid Daydream	4	Jevian Toledo	Gary Capuano	Paul L. Fowler, Jr.	7 fur.	1:24.62	$100,000
2022	Fille d'Esprit	4	Xavier Perez	John J. Robb	C J I Phoenix Group	7 fur.	1:25.05	$101,000
2021	Hello Beautiful	4	Jevian Toledo	Brittany Russell	Madaket Stables	7 fur.	1:22.22	$100,000
2020	Hello Beautiful	3	Sheldon Russell	Brittany Russell	Madaket Stables	7 fur.	1:21.84	$101,000
2019	Anna's Bandit	5	Xavier Perez	John J. Robb	No Guts No Glory Farm	7 fur.	1:23.03	$100,000
2018	Crabcakes	4	Forest Boyce	T. Bernard Houghton	Morgan's Ford Farm	7 fur.	1:22.85	$100,000
2017	Crabcakes	3	Forest Boyce	T. Bernard Houghton	Morgan's Ford Farm	7 fur.	1:23.03	$100,000
2016	Rockin JoJo	4	Angel Cruz	Guadalupe Preciado	Michael R. Cox	7 fur.	1:25.06	$100,000
2015	Lionhearted Lady	4	Xavier Perez	Hamilton A. Smith	JoAnn Smith	7 fur.	1:24.31	$100,000
2014	Classy Coco	4	Trevor McCarthy	T. Bernard Houghton	Michael R. Cox	7 fur.	1:23.93	$100,000
2013	Maddy's Dance	3	Daniel Centeno	John Rigattieri	Dennis J. Federico	7 fur.	1:23.65	$100,000
2012	Bold Affair	4	Abel Castellano	Harry Wolfendale	Mike Zanella	7 fur.	1:24.52	$100,000
2011	Love That Dance	5	Pablo Fragoso	Benjamin Perkins	John Petrini	7 fur.	1:24.51	$100,000
2010	Blind Date	4	Sheldon Russell	Hamilton A. Smith	William Backer	7 fur.	1:28.82	$100,000
2009	All Giving	5	Jonathan Joyce	Flint W. Stites	Concepts Unlim.Stable	7 fur.	1:23.34	$100,000
2008	Spectacular Malibu	4	Julian Pimentel	Michael J. Trombetta	Country Life Farm	7 fur.	1:23.56	$150,000
2007	Akronism	3	Anthony Black	Timothy F. Ritchey	Robert S. Evans	7 fur.	1:24.00	$150,000
2006	Silmaril	5	Ryan Fogelsonger	Christopher Grove	Stephen E. Quick	7 fur.	1:23.00	$150,000
2005	Valley of the Gods	5	Harry Vega	Keith W. LeBarron	David O'Neill	7 fur.	1:25.34	$150,000
2004	Merryland Missy	4	Stewart Elliott	Timothy F. Ritchey	Country Life Farm	6 fur.	1:10.60	$100,000
2003	Willa On the Move	4	Mario Pino	Anthony W. Dutrow	Marathon Farms, Inc.	7 fur.	1:22.73	$100,000
2002	Blinded by Love	4	Richard Migliore	Benjamin W. Perkins Jr.	New Farm	6 fur.	1:11.28	$100,000
2001	Case of the Blues	4	Mario Pino	Anthony W. Dutrow	Skeedattle II	6 fur.	1:11.54	$100,000
2000	Tropical Punch	4	Heberto Castillo Jr.	James A. Jerkens	Susan & John Moore	7 fur.	1:23.46	$100,000
1999	Flippy Diane	5	Diane J. Nelson	Leah Gyarmati	Castle Village Farm	7 fur.	1:23.80	$100,000
1998	Weather Vane	4	Mario Pino	Richard W. Delp	Par Four Rac.Stables	7 fur.	1:23.20	$100,000
1997	Secret Prospect	4	Mark Johnston	John J. Tammaro III	Conover Stable	7 fur.	1:24.60	$100,000
1996	Heavenly Punch	4	Edgar S. Prado	Sid C. Attard	C. Stable & R. Harvey	7 fur.	1:23.00	$100,000
1995	Churchbell Chimes	4	Alberto Delgado	J. William Boniface	Susan Granville	7 fur.	1:24.00	$100,000
1994	Alcovy	4	Scott Edward Miller	William G. Huffman	L. Riley Magnum	7 fur.	1:23.60	$100,000
1993	Star Minister	4	Andrea Seefeldt	Richard W. Small	Robert Meyerhoff	7 fur.	1:24.20	$100,000
1992	Brilliant Brass	5	Edgar S. Prado	Carlos A. Garcia	Elaine L. Bassford	6 fur.	1:11.60	$100,000
1991	Safely Kept	5	Gary Stevens	Alan E. Goldberg	Jayeff B Stable	6 fur.	1:11.00	$100,000
1990	Safely Kept	4	Julie Krone	Alan E. Goldberg	Jayeff B Stable	6 fur.	1:11.00	$100,000
1989	Safely Kept	3	Craig Perret	Alan E. Goldberg	Barry Weisbord	6 fur.	1:10.00	$100,000
1988	Dark Tzarina	5	M. J. Conner	H. Kirk Steen Jr.	Cerulean Farm	6 fur.	1:10.80	$100,000
1987	Ms. Rutledge	3	Kent Desormeaux	King T. Leatherbury	Herman Greenberg	6 fur.	1:11.20	$100,000
1986	Capp It Off	4	Jerry D. Bailey	Gregory L. Wilson	Oliver Goldsmith	6 fur.	1:11.80	$100,000

== See also ==
- Maryland Million Distaff Handicap top three finishers
- Maryland Million Day
- Laurel Park Racecourse
