= Dearly Precious Stakes =

- Class: Ungraded stakes
- Location: Aqueduct Racetrack; Queens, New York, United States
- Inaugurated: 1995
- Race type: Thoroughbred - Flat racing
- Website: www.nyra.com/Aqueduct/Stakes/DearlyPrecious.shtml

Race information
- Distance: 6 furlong sprint
- Surface: Dirt
- Track: left-handed
- Qualification: Three-year-old fillies
- Weight: Assigned
- Purse: $65,000

The Dearly Precious Stakes is an American Thoroughbred horse race held annually in mid February at Aqueduct Racetrack in Queens, New York. Open to three-year-old fillies, the non-graded stakes is contested on dirt over a distance of six furlongs.

The race is named in honor of Dearly Precious, the 1975 American Champion Two-Year-Old Filly who was in the hunt for another Championship at age three when she suffered a career-ending injury on July 11, 1976 while winning the Dark Mirage Stakes at Aqueduct Racetrack.

== Records ==
Speed record:

- 1:10.20 - T Storm (1999)

Most wins by a jockey:

- 2 - Richard Migliore (1997, 2002)
- 2 - Aaron Gryder (1998, 2000)
- 2 - Mario Pino (2004, 2008)

Most wins by a trainer:

- No trainer has won this race more than once.

Most wins by an owner:

- No owner has won this race more than once.

== Winners ==
| Year | Winner | Jockey | Trainer | Owner | Time |
|---|---|---|---|---|---|
| 2011 | Coax Liberty | David Cohen | James L. Lawrence, II | Copper Penny Stables | 1:11.24 |
| 2010 | Fuzzy Britches | Ramon Dominguez | Rick Dutrow, Jr. | | 1:11.88 |
| 2009 | Dream Play | Eddie Castro | Kiaran McLaughlin | Stewart L. Armstrong | 1:10.86 |
| 2008 | Ready for Fortune | Mario Pino | Gary C. Contessa | Dennis Narlinger | 1:11.31 |
| 2007 | Special Dream | Alan Garcia | Guadolupe Preciado | Hidden Lanes Farm | 1:11.36 |
| 2006 | Ring True | Norberto Arroyo | James A. Jerkens | Joseph Iracane | 1:12.01 |
| 2005 | Acey Deucey | Diane Nelson | John Morrison | Jeffrey Tucker | 1:10.68 |
| 2004 | Among My Souvenirs | Mario Pino | Anthony W. Dutrow | Peter G. Angelos | 1:11.60 |
| 2003 | Ladyecho | Oliver Castillo | John Servis | Charlotte C. Polin | 1:12.68 |
| 2002 | Proper Gamble | Richard Migliore | Todd A. Pletcher | Stoneway Farm | 1:11.01 |
| 2001 | Xtra Heat | Rick Wilson | John Salzman | Kenneth Taylor | 1:11.88 |
| 2000 | Southern Sandra | Aaron Gryder | Robert Barbara | Sabine Stable | 1:11.80 |
| 1999 | T Storm | Jose Espinoza | Rene Araya | R. Kay Stable | 1:10.20 |
| 1998 | Diablo's Notably | Aaron Gryder | Richard Schosberg | Dale H. Austin | 1:12.40 |
| 1997 | Parlay | Richard Migliore | John C. Kimmel | Ackerly Bros. & R. Levy | 1:11.20 |
| 1996 | Infomint | Carlos Marquez, Jr. | Ben Perkins, Jr. | New Farm | 1:11.20 |
| 1995 | Evil's Pic | Mike Luzzi | Howard M. Tesher | Theodore Shapiro | 1:13.60 |
