= Jose Espinoza (jockey) =

Mexican jockey (born 1969)

José Espinoza
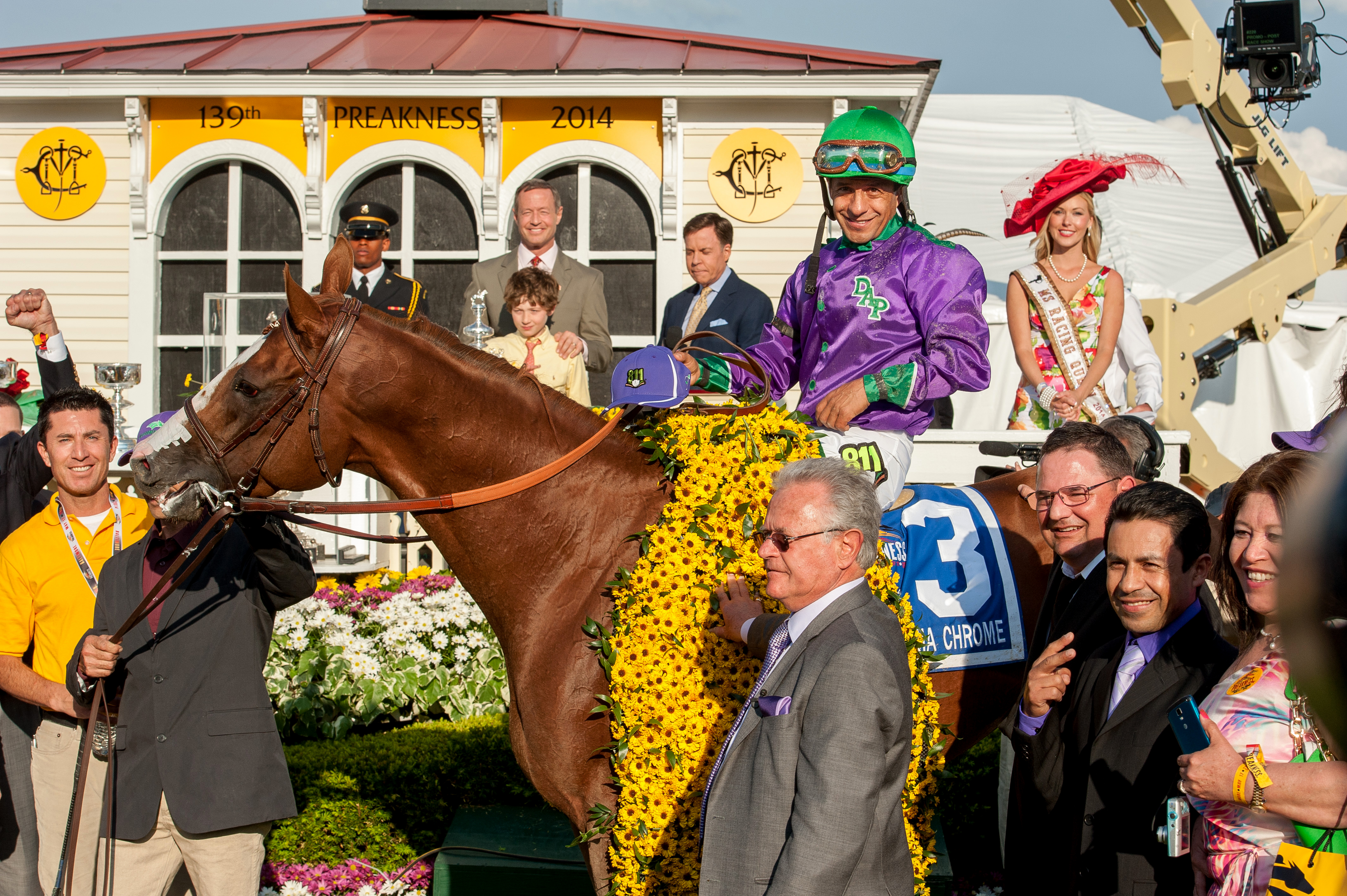
- California Chrome in the winners circle of the 139th Preakness Stakes. Jockey Victor Espinoza up, trainer Art Sherman at horse's shoulder, behind him is son and assistant Alan Sherman (wearing glasses) and José Luis Espinoza

Personal information
- Born: December 17, 1969 (age 56) Mexico City, Mexico
- Occupation: Jockey

Horse racing career
- Sport: Horse racing

Major racing wins
- Busher Stakes (1999); Dearly Precious Stakes (1999); Jaipur Stakes (1999); Mount Vernon Stakes (1999, 2008); Next Move Handicap (1999); Wide Country Stakes (1999); Withers Stakes (1999); First Flight Handicap (2000); Long Island Handicap (2001); Fort Marcy Handicap (2003); Gallant Fox Handicap (2003); Kelso Stakes (2003); Pilgrim Stakes (2004); Aqueduct Handicap (2005); Damon Runyon Stakes (2005); East View Stakes (2005); Ladies Handicap (2005); Stymie Handicap (2007); Greenwood Cup Stakes (2008); Manhattan Handicap (2011); Eatontown Handicap (2012); New York Breeders' Futurity (2012); John B. Connally Turf Cup (2013); Sam F. Davis Stakes (2013); Tampa Bay Stakes (2013); New York Derby (2013)

Significant horses
- Evening Attire, Interpatation, Swift Warrior, Freefourinternet, Falling Sky

José Luis Espinoza (born December 17, 1969, in Mexico City, Mexico) is a Mexican retired jockey in American Thoroughbred horse racing. He is the older brother of U.S. Triple Crown-winning jockey Victor Espinoza.

== Career ==
Espinoza rode in his first Kentucky Derby in 2013, guiding Giant Finish to a 10th-place finish for Sunrise Stables and trainer Anthony Dutrow.

In August 2013, Espinoza suffered a traumatic brain injury when he was thrown from a mount after crossing the finish line. This head injury effectively ended his career as a jockey. After 8 months of treatment, he retired at the age of 44 with a total of 856 wins.

== Year-end charts ==
Chart (2001–present)	Peak position
National Earnings List for Jockeys 2001	65
