= First Flight Handicap =

- Class: Grade II
- Location: Belmont Racetrack; Elmont, New York, United States
- Inaugurated: 1978
- Race type: Thoroughbred – Flat racing
- Website: www.nyra.com/Belmont/Stakes/FirstFlight.shtml

Race information
- Distance: 7 furlongs
- Surface: Dirt
- Track: left-handed
- Qualification: Fillies & Mares, three-years-old & up
- Weight: Assigned
- Purse: US$150,000

The First Flight Handicap is an American Thoroughbred horse race held annually in late June/early July at Belmont Park in Elmont, New York. A Grade II event open to fillies and Mares, ages three and older, it is contested on dirt over a distance of seven furlongs.

The race is named in honor of Cornelius Vanderbilt Whitney's American Champion Two-Year-Old Filly of 1946. First Flight won the Matron Stakes, and beat male opponents in winning the Belmont Futurity Stakes.

Inaugurated in 1978, the race has been hosted by Aqueduct Racetrack and Belmont Park:

- Aqueduct – 1978–1989, 1991–2002, 2004–2006
- Belmont – 1990, 2001, 2003, 2007–present

== Records ==
Speed record:

- 1:20.60 – Shared Interest (1992)

Most wins:

- 2 – Twist Afleet (1994, 1995)
- 2 – Country Hideaway (1999, 2000)
- 2 – Shine Again (2001, 2002)

Most wins by a jockey:

- 4 – Jerry Bailey (1987, 1990, 1992, 1994)

Most wins by a trainer:

- 6 – H. Allen Jerkens (1991, 1993, 1997, 2001, 2002, 2008)

Most wins by an owner:

- 3 – Bohemia Stable (1997, 2001, 2002)

== Winners ==
Year	Winner	Age	Jockey	Trainer	Owner	Time
2009	Porte Bonheur	4	Ramon Domínguez	David Duggan	Johanna Murphy-Leopoldsberger	1:22.45
2008	Any Limit	5	Cornelio Velásquez	H. Allen Jerkens	Joseph V. Shields Jr.	1:23.86
2007	Ginger Punch	4	Rafael Bejarano	Robert J. Frankel	Stronach Stable	1:22.64
2006	Carmandia	4	Chris DeCarlo	Richard E. Dutrow Jr.	Four Roses Thoroughbreds	1:22.91
2005	Great Intentions	4	Edgar Prado	Michael E. Hushion	Barry K. Schwartz	1:23.98
2004	Bending Strings	3	Shaun Bridgmohan	Kiaran McLaughlin	John D. Gunther	1:22.13
2003	Randaroo	3	Heberto Castillo Jr.	Kiaran McLaughlin	H. Joseph Allen	1:23.65
2002	Shine Again	5	Jean-Luc Samyn	H. Allen Jerkens	Bohemia Stable	1:23.75
2001	Shine Again	4	Jean-Luc Samyn	H. Allen Jerkens	Bohemia Stable	1:23.21
2000	Country Hideaway	4	Jose Espinoza	C. R. McGaughey III	Ogden Phipps	1:22.60
1999	Country Hideaway	3	Heberto Castillo Jr.	C. R. McGaughey III	Ogden Phipps	1:23.00
1998	Catinca	3	Richard Migliore	John C. Kimmel	Robert K. Waxman	1:22.14
1997	Dixie Flag	3	Mike Luzzi	H. Allen Jerkens	Bohemia Stable	1:22.84
1996	Thunder Achiever	3	Robbie Davis	Carlos F. Martin	Flying Zee Stables	1:21.59
1995	Twist Afleet	4	Gary Stevens	John C. Kimmel	Lucille Conover	1:22.95
1994	Twist Afleet	3	Jerry Bailey	John C. Kimmel	Lucille Conover	1:23.02
1993	Raise Heck	5	Roger I. Velez	H. Allen Jerkens	Hobeau Farm	1:23.51
1992	Shared Interest	4	Jerry Bailey	Flint S. Schulhofer	Robert S. Evans	1:20.65
1991	Missy's Mirage	3	Eddie Maple	H. Allen Jerkens	Middletown Stables	1:21.98
1990	Queena	4	Jerry Bailey	C. R. McGaughey III	Emory G. Alexander	1:22.40
1989	Grecian Flight	5	Craig Perret	Joseph H. Pierce Jr.	Henry C. B. Lindh	1:22.00
1988	Cagey Exuberance	4	Joseph Imparato	Robert W. Camac	Lindsey D. Burbank	1:24.40
1987	Al's Helen	4	Jerry Bailey	Jack Van Berg	Kinsman Stable	1:21.80
1986	Chaldea	6	Jean-Luc Samyn	Thomas J. Skiffington	R. Lewis Mangum	1:22.40
1985	Alabama Nana	4	Jorge Velásquez	D. Wayne Lukas	Leonard D. Mathis	1:22.20
1984	Shortly	4	Mario G. Pino	James W. Murphy	Sam O. Graham	1:22.60
1983	Pert	4	Frank Lovato Jr.	Stephen A. DiMauro	Harold I. Snyder	1:25.20
1982	Number	3	Eddie Maple	Woody Stephens	Claiborne Farm	1:22.20
1981	Island Charm	4	Richard Migliore	Stephen A. DiMauro	David A. McKibbin	1:23.60
1980	Samarta Dancer	4	Cash Asmussen	Carlos A. Garcia	Gustave Ring	1:25.60
1979	Gladiolus	5	Laffit Pincay Jr.	Freeman E. McMillan	Sea Spray Farms	1:22.40
1978	What A Summer	5	Jeffrey Fell	LeRoy Jolley	Diana M. Firestone	1:22.20
