= Tosmah =

American Thoroughbred racehorse

- Sire: Tim Tam
- Grandsire: Tom Fool
- Dam: Cosmah
- Damsire: Cosmic Bomb
- Sex: Filly
- Foaled: 1961
- Country: United States
- Color: Bay
- Breeder: Eugene Mori
- Owner: Briardale Farm (Anthony Imbesi)
- Trainer: Joseph W. Mergler
- Record: 39: 23-6-2
- Earnings: $612,588

Major wins
- Frizette Stakes (1963); Astarita Stakes (1963); Mermaid Stakes (1963); Arlington Classic (1964); Arlington Matron Handicap (1964); Beldame Stakes (1964); Liberty Bell Handicap (1964); Maskette Handicap (1964, 1965); Jersey Belle Tercentenary Stakes (1964); Quaker City Handicap (1964); Miss Woodford Stakes (1964); Colonial Handicap (1966); Barbara Fritchie Handicap (1966); John B. Campbell Handicap (1966)

Awards
- DRF & TSD American Champion Two-Year-Old Filly (1963); American Champion Three-Year-Old Filly (1964); DRF American Champion Female Handicap Horse (1964)

Honors
- U.S. Racing Hall of Fame (1984); Tosmah Handicap at Arlington Park
- Last updated on December 22, 2007

Tosmah (1961–1992) was a champion Thoroughbred race horse. She was the leading American filly of her generation at both two and three years of age.

== Background ==
Tosmah was bred in Kentucky by Eugene Mori. Her sire was the great Tim Tam, by Tom Fool out of Two Lea. Many consider Tim Tam's loss of Thoroughbred racing's American Triple Crown only a matter of fate. After winning the first two legs (Kentucky Derby and Preakness Stakes), he was leading in the Belmont Stakes when he broke down, coming in second. Retired early, he went on as a sire, producing a number of stakes winners. Tosmah is considered his very best. Her dam, Cosmah, was the 1974 Kentucky Broodmare of the Year, who also produced Halo, who sired Sunny's Halo and Sunday Silence.

== Racing career ==
At the age of two, she started eight times and lost once. For this, she was named the American Champion Two-Year-Old Filly of 1963. This was before the Eclipse Awards when championships were determined by the Daily Racing Form, Turf and Sports Digest magazine, and the Thoroughbred Racing Association. Tosmah was named champion by Daily Racing Form and Turf and Sports Digest, while Castle Forbes took the rival Thoroughbred Racing Association award.

When Tosmah was three, she started in fourteen races, winning ten, vying all year with a splendid filly called Old Hat. 1964 saw her highest earnings, $305,283, and the title of American Champion Three-Year-Old Filly. She was named American Champion Female Handicap Horse by Daily Racing Form.

In 1965, at the age of four she won her second Maskette Handicap (now known as the Go For Wand Handicap) under 128 pounds, in the process beating the great filly Affectionately, no. 81 in the Blood-Horse magazine List of the Top 100 U.S. Racehorses of the 20th Century, in a driving finish.

In her final season, Tosmah defeated Lucky Debonair, the winner of the 1965 Kentucky Derby, in the John B. Campbell Handicap.

== Broodmare ==
Of four foals, Tosmah gave birth to only one stakes winner, La Guidecca.

Her short producing career was reportedly "essentially wasted due to repeated matings with her owner's indifferent stallions".

She died in 1992 at the advanced age of thirty-one and is buried at Briardale Farm, Estell Manor, New Jersey.

Tosmah was inducted into the Hall of Fame in 1984.

== Pedigree ==
Pedigree of Tosmah, bay mare, 2016
Sire Tim Tam	Tom Fool	Menow	Pharamond
Sire Tim Tam	Tom Fool	Menow	Alcibiades
Sire Tim Tam	Tom Fool	Gaga	Bull Dog
Sire Tim Tam	Tom Fool	Gaga	Alpoise
Sire Tim Tam	Two Lea	Bull Lea	Bull Dog
Sire Tim Tam	Two Lea	Bull Lea	Rose leaves
Sire Tim Tam	Two Lea	Two Bob	The Porter
Sire Tim Tam	Two Lea	Two Bob	Blessings
Dam Cosmah	Cosmic Bomb	Pharamond	Phalaris
Dam Cosmah	Cosmic Bomb	Pharamond	Selene
Dam Cosmah	Cosmic Bomb	Banish Fear	Blue Larkspur
Dam Cosmah	Cosmic Bomb	Banish Fear	Herodiade
Dam Cosmah	Almahmoud	Mahmoud	Blenheim
Dam Cosmah	Almahmoud	Mahmoud	Mah Mahal
Dam Cosmah	Almahmoud	Arbitrator	Peace Chance
Dam Cosmah	Almahmoud	Arbitrator	Mother Goose (family: 2-d)
