= Tempted (horse) =

American-bred Thoroughbred racehorse

- Sire: Half Crown
- Grandsire: Hyperion
- Dam: Enchanted Eve
- Damsire: Lovely Night
- Sex: Filly
- Foaled: 1955
- Country: United States
- Colour: Chestnut
- Breeder: Christiana Stables
- Owner: Mooring Stable
- Trainer: Henry S. Clark
- Record: 45: 18-4-9
- Earnings: US$330,760

Major wins
- Jeanne d 'Arc Stakes (1957); Alabama Stakes (1958); Maskette Handicap (1958, 1960); Beldame Handicap (1959); Diana Handicap (1959, 1960); Ladies Handicap (1959)

Awards
- American Champion Older Female Horse (1959)

Honours
- Tempted Stakes at Aqueduct Racetrack

Tempted (foaled 1955 in Kentucky) was an American Champion Thoroughbred racehorse.

Trained by future U.S, Racing Hall of Fame inductee Henry Clark and usually ridden by Eldon Nelson, Tempted was a multiple stakes winner of important races for fillies. In 1959 she was voted American Champion Older Female Horse honors.
