= Hidden Lake (horse) =

American-bred Thoroughbred racehorse

- Sire: Quiet American
- Grandsire: Fappiano
- Dam: Friendly Circle
- Damsire: Round Table
- Sex: Mare
- Foaled: 1993
- Died: 2016
- Country: United States
- Color: Bay
- Breeder: Charles Nuckols Jr. & Sons
- Owner: Robert N. Clay & Tracy Farmer
- Trainer: John C. Kimmel
- Record: 22: 7-4-6
- Earnings: $947,489

Major wins
- La Brea Stakes (1996); Beldame Stakes (1997); Go For Wand Handicap (1997); Hempstead Handicap (1997); Shuvee Handicap (1997)

Awards
- U.S. Champion Older Dirt Female Horse (1997)
- Last updated on September 2, 2020

Hidden Lake (April 2, 1993 – September 29, 2016) was a Kentucky-bred daughter of stallion Quiet American out of the Round Table mare, Friendly Circle. Slow to mature, she went on to earn 1997 U.S. Champion Older Mare honors.

== Career ==
As a two-year-old, Hidden Lake won only once, in her second start on August 5, 1995, at Del Mar racetrack. She showed some promise by finishing second in the Maker's Mark Stakes and Anoakia Stakes. She started her three-year-old season with an allowance race win on January 6, 1996, at Santa Anita but then went on a six race losing streak that included third-place finishes in the Santa Anita Oaks and Las Virgenes Stakes, both Grade I stakes. She finally earned her first graded stakes win in the grade II La Brea Stakes on December 29.

At age four, she lost her first four starts of the year while traveling from Santa Anita Park to Oaklawn Park to Churchill Downs. On May 24, she was shipped to Belmont Park for the Grade II Shuvee Handicap, which she won as an 8.8–1 long-shot by 4 lengths. She followed this up with a win in the Grade I Hempstead Handicap (now known as the Ogden Phipps), then shipped to Saratoga for the Go For Wand Handicap on July 27. Hidden Lake went to the early lead but was challenged by Flat Fleet Feet, who moved alongside when they entered the stretch. Flat Fleet Feet looked to have the advantage but Hidden Lake fought back and prevailed by a head. Her jockey, Richard Migliore, called the Go For Wand "one of his most memorable victories", saying, "From the recesses of her heart, Hidden Lake found a way to fight back and win. After the finish line, she actually collapsed from exhaustion. That was how much effort she put into winning that race. She was running on empty and found more to give".

It was nearly three months before Hidden Lake was ready to race again, but she returned with a victory in the Beldame Stakes at Belmont Park on October 17. Shipped back to California for the Breeders' Cup Distaff at Hollywood Park, she finished seventh in the last start of her career. She received the Eclipse Award as the American Champion Older Dirt Female Horse of 1997.

== Retirement ==
None of Hidden Lake's seven foals reached her level of success in racing but all made it to the racetrack and four were winners of minor races. With declining fertility, in January 2009 she was pensioned by owner Robert Evans to Old Friends Equine in Georgetown, Kentucky. On September 29, 2016, she was euthanized due to the infirmities of old age.
