= Alan E. Goldberg =

Alan Goldberg
Personal information
- Born: July 16, 1949 (age 77) Philadelphia, Pennsylvania
- Occupation: Trainer

Horse racing career
- Sport: Horse racing
- Career wins: 1,125+ (ongoing)

Major racing wins
- Red Bank Stakes (1986); Gallorette Handicap (1988, 2009); Violet Handicap (1988); Garden State Handicap (1989, 1990, 1991); Genuine Risk Handicap (1989, 1990, 1991); Columbia Stakes (1989); Maryland Million Distaff Handicap (1989, 1990, 1991); Prioress Stakes (1989); Test Stakes (1989); Thoroughbred Club of America Stakes (1990); Chicago Handicap (1991); Nashua Stakes (1996); Federico Tesio Stakes (2000); Jamaica Handicap (2001); Nassau County Stakes (2001); Oceanport Stakes (2003); Giant's Causeway Stakes (2006); Laurel Futurity Stakes (2006); Leonard Richards Stakes (2006); Eatontown Handicap (2008); Red Smith Handicap (2008); Pennsylvania Governor's Cup Stakes (2016) Breeders' Cup wins: Breeders' Cup Sprint (1990)

Significant horses
- Safely Kept, Strike A Deal

Alan E. Goldberg (born July 16, 1949) is an American Thoroughbred horse racing trainer. He began his career as a professional trainer in the early 1970s, serving as an apprentice to Walter Kelley from a base at New York's Aqueduct Racetrack. In 1974 he went out on his own and in 1989 trained Safely Kept to American Champion Sprint Horse honors. The following year, Goldberg won the most important race of his career to date when Safely Kept won the Breeders' Cup Sprint.
