= Behaving Badly (horse) =

American-bred Thoroughbred racehorse

- Sire: Pioneering
- Grandsire: Mr. Prospector
- Dam: Timeleighness
- Damsire: Sir Raleigh
- Sex: Mare
- Foaled: 2001
- Country: United States
- Colour: Bay
- Breeder: Thomas/Lakin
- Owner: Patti & Hal J. Earnhardt III
- Trainer: Bob Baffert
- Record: 13: 9-2-0
- Earnings: $ 749,224

Major wins
- Rancho Bernardo Handicap (2005, 2006); Santa Monica Handicap (2006); Genuine Risk Handicap (2006); Las Flores Handicap (2006); Big Brush Stakes (2006)
- Last updated on September 2, 2007

Behaving Badly is a Thoroughbred racing mare foaled on April 5, 2001, in New York and a top sprinting distaffer. Sired by Pioneering, a Mr. Prospector son (going back to Secretariat), out of Timeleighness (by Sir Raleigh), she was bred by Thomas and Lakin, and owned by Patti and Hal J. Earnhardt III.

Behaving Badly is a half-sister to stakes-winning filly Lavish Numbers. Her dam, Timeleighness, is a full sister to stakes winner Timelessleigh.

Trained by Bob Baffert, she had been pointed to the $2 million TVG Breeders' Cup Sprint for 2006, but instead, Baffert decided to retire her after a disappointing effort in the Thoroughbred Club of America Stakes at Keeneland Race Course. He said, "There have always been little things that bothered her, so I just didn't want to press her anymore. She'd done so much, what was there left for her to do?"

Of her thirteen starts, Behaving Badly won nine, and placed in 2. This means she was out of the money only twice. Racing under jockey Victor Espinoza through her fifth year, she earned $749,224.

At four she won the Grade III Rancho Bernardo Handicap. At five, she took five of seven starts, beginning with three straight wins at Santa Anita Park in California. She won the Grade I Santa Monica Handicap in January 2006 and the Grade III Las Flores Handicap in February. She followed that by placing to Pussycat Doll in the Grade I Humana Distaff Handicap, and then went on to win the Grade II Genuine Risk Breeders' Cup Handicap on July 3, the Grade III Rancho Bernardo for the second straight time on August 18, and then the Big Brush Stakes. After that came her fourth-place finish as the 9-to-10 favorite in Thoroughbred Club.

Behaving Badly is now a broodmare at John Sikura's Hill 'n' Dale Farms near Lexington, Kentucky.
