= Eldon Nelson =

American jockey

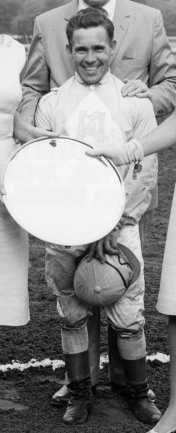
- Eldon Nelson after winning the 1959 Diana Stakes

Personal information
- Born: January 28, 1927 Glenrose Township, Noble County, Oklahoma
- Died: March 16, 2012 (aged 85) Sedan, Kansas
- Occupation: Jockey

Horse racing career
- Sport: Horse racing

Major racing wins
- Arlington Handicap (1954); Laurel Turf Cup Handicap (1954); Alabama Stakes (1957); American Legion Handicap (1957); Grand Union Hotel Stakes (1957); Brooklyn Handicap (1957); Delaware Handicap (1958); Ladies Handicap (1958, 1959); Vagrancy Handicap (1958); Bed O' Roses Handicap (1959); Beldame Stakes (1959); Diana Handicap (1959, 1960); Nassau County Handicap (1959); Roamer Handicap (1959); Maskette Stakes (1960, 1973); New York Breeders' Cup Handicap (1960); Vosburgh Stakes (1960); Dwyer Stakes (1962); Manhattan Handicap (1963); Gallant Fox Handicap (1964); Maryland Futurity (1964); Massachusetts Handicap (1964, 1965); Valley Forge Handicap (1964); Cowdin Stakes (1965); Jerome Handicap (1965); Whimsical Stakes (1969); Molly Pitcher Handicap (1970, 1973); Toboggan Handicap (1972); Hempstead Handicap (1973) American Classic Race wins: Preakness Stakes (1972)

Honours
- Oklahoma Horse Racing Hall of Fame (2009)

Significant horses
- Coaltown, Silver Spoon, Tempted; Bold Bidder, Bee Bee Bee

Glen Eldon Nelson (January 28, 1927 - March 16, 2012) was an American jockey in the sport of Thoroughbred horse racing who competed primarily at tracks on the East Coast of the United States and who is best known for winning the 1972 Preakness Stakes.

In 1948, Eldon Nelson married Betty Rose Coffman (1930–2005) with whom he had two children.

During a career that spanned four decades, Nelson rode for some of the leading stables in the country including Henry and Jane Lunger's Christiana Stables, Isabel Dodge Sloane's Brookmeade Stable, as well as the renowned Calumet Farm. On February 28, 1949, at Hialeah Park Race Track in Hialeah, Florida, he rode Calumet's future U.S. Racing Hall of Fame colt Coaltown to a win that equalled the world record of 1:47 3/5 for a mile-and-an-eighth on dirt.

== American Classic Races ==
Eldon Nelson had two mounts in the Belmont Stakes with his best result in 1957 when he rode Inside Tract to a second-place finish behind Gallant Man. On May 29, 1972, the forty-four-year-old Nelson earned the most important win of his career. In his fourth mount in the Preakness Stakes, the second leg of the U.S. Triple Crown series, on a sloppy Pimlico Race Course he rode the William S. Farish III colt Bee Bee Bee to victory.

Eldon Nelson retired in 1973. He and his wife returned to live on their farm near Cedar Vale, Kansas.

In 2009, Nelson was inducted into the Oklahoma Horse Racing Hall of Fame.
