= Miracle Wood Stakes =

- Class: Ungraded Stakes
- Location: Laurel Park Racecourse, Laurel, Maryland, United States
- Inaugurated: 1995
- Race type: Thoroughbred – Flat racing
- Website: www.laurelpark.com

Race information
- Distance: 7 furlongs
- Surface: Dirt
- Track: left-handed
- Qualification: Three-years-old, open
- Weight: Assigned
- Purse: US$100,000

The Miracle Wood Stakes is an American Thoroughbred horse race held in February at Laurel Park Racecourse in Laurel, Maryland. The Miracle Wood is open to three-year-olds and is run at seven furlongs on the dirt.

An ungraded stakes, it currently offers a purse of $100,000. The Miracle Wood is also one of Maryland's triple crown prep races. The winner of the race typically moves on to compete in the Private Terms Stakes held in March at Laurel Park Racecourse as well, but winners have also ventured to New York and Kentucky for their next races.

The race was named in honor of Miracle Wood, a champion Maryland bred colt that won many races and accolades. In 2008, the race was shortened from one mile to the current distance of seven furlongs. During the first eleven years of the race (1993–2003), it was run at a distance of 1 1/16 miles (8.5 furlongs).

In 2006, Sweetnorthernsaint set a record winning margin of ten lengths. He went on to win the Illinois Derby that year and was the post time favorite in the 132nd Kentucky Derby. A local horse based at Laurel Park Racecourse, Sweetnorthernsaint became a millionaire and placed second in the state's biggest race, the Preakness Stakes.

== Records ==
Speed record:

- 7 furlongs – 1:23.22 – The Lumber Guy (2012)
- 1 mile – 1:36.75 – Extrasexyhippzster (2014)
- 1 1/16 miles – 1:43.00 – Gimmeawink (2003)

Most wins by an owner:

- no owner has the Miracle Wood Stakes more than once

Most wins by a jockey:

- 4 – Mario Pino (1997, 2002, 2006 & 2007)
- 3 – Julian Pimentel (2008, 2012 & 2014)

Most wins by a trainer:

- 3 – Michael Trombetta (2006, 2007 & 2014)

== Winners of the Miracle Wood Stakes since 1995 ==
Year	Winner	Age	Jockey	Trainer	Owner	Distance	Time	Purse
2021	Maythehorsebwithu	3	Sheldon Russell	Brittany Russell	Michael Dubb and Bethlehem Stables LLC	1 mile	1:37.02	$100,000
2020	Lebda	3	Alex Cintron	Claudio Gonzalez	Euro Stable	1 mile	1:38.38	$100,000
2019	Alwaysmining	3	Daniel Centeno	Kelly Rubley	Runnymede Racing LLC	1 mile	1:35.27	$100,000
2018	Still Having Fun	3	Feargal Lynch	Timothy Keefe	Gary Barber	1 mile	1:37.51	$100,000
2017	O Dionysus	3	Jevion Toledo	Gary Capuano	Marathon Farms, Inc.	1 mile	1:37.06	$100,000
2016	Marengo Road	3	Julian Pimentel	Michael Trombetta	Harry Meyerhoff	1 mile	1:40.00	$75,000
2015	Savvy Street	3	Forest Boyce	Donald H. Barr	Barbara J. Houck	1 mile	1:40.36	$100,000
2014	Extrasexyhippzster	3	Julian Pimentel	Michael Trombetta	Kirwan Equine Group	1 mile	1:36.75	$100,000
2013	Dynamic Strike	3	Forrest Boyce	Richard Small	Fitzhugh LLC	7 fur.	1:40.58	$125,000
2012	The Lumber Guy	3	Julian Pimentel	Michael Hushion	Barry K. Schwartz	7 fur.	1:23.22	$100,000
2011	J J's Lucky Train	3	José C. Ferrer	William D. Anderson	Fresh Start Stable	7 fur.	1:23.60	$75,000
2010	Don't Blame the Cat	3	Erick Rodriguez	Richard Dutrow Jr.	Mary Raymond	7 fur.	1:23.62	$70,000
2009	Rock On Justin	3	Tony Maragh	Gary Capuano	Non Stop Stable's	7 fur.	1:24.58	$75,000
2008	Gattopardo	3	Julian Pimentel	Timothy Tullock Jr.	Germania Farm	7 fur.	1:24.16	$90,000
2007	Crafty Bear	3	Mario Pino	Michael Trombetta	Harry Meyerhoff	1 mile	1:38.55	$75,000
2006	Sweetnorthernsaint	3	Mario Pino	Michael Trombetta	Joe Balsamo/Ted Theos	1 mile	1:38.69	$75,000
2005	Malibu Moonshine	3	Steve Hamilton	King T. Leatherbury	Woodrow Marriott	1 mile	1:40.25	$75,000
2004	Water Cannon	3	Ramon Domínguez	Linda Albert	Nonsequitur Stable	1-1/16	1:38.99	$65,000
2003	Gimmeawink	3	Jeremy Rose	Timothy F. Ritchey	Walter Weinkowitz	1-1/16	1:43.07	$60,000
2002	Saratoga Blues	3	Mario Pino	Anthony W. Dutrow	Alvin Akman	1-1/16	1:45.80	$60,000
2001	Talk is Money	3	Edgar Prado	John Scanlon	Daniel Borislow	1-1/16	1:45.96	$67,000
2000	Connect	3	Ryan Fogelsonger	Leslie Saunders	John R. Rastetter	1-1/16	1:51.40	$45,000
1999	Ewer All Wet	3	Edgar Prado	Rodney Jenkins	Kathryn Clark	1-1/16	1:44.80	$45,000
1998	Mister Business	3	Joe Rocco	Richard E. Dutrow	Swan and Cygnet Farm	1-1/16	1:45.20	$45,000
1997	South West Hostage	3	Mario Pino	Ferris Allen	Wombat Racing Stable	5.5 fur.	1:05.60	$30,000
1996	Game Quoit	3	Mark Johnston	Donald H. Barr	Donald H. Barr	5.5 fur.	1:03.20	$30,000
1995	South Bend	3	Alberto Delgado	Barbara M. Kees	Barbara M. Kees	7 fur	1:25.20	$30,000

== See also ==
- Miracle Wood Stakes "top three finishers"
- Pimlico Race Course
