= Quiet American (horse) =

American-bred Thoroughbred racehorse

- Sire: Fappiano
- Grandsire: Mr. Prospector
- Dam: Demure
- Damsire: Dr. Fager
- Sex: Stallion
- Foaled: 1986
- Country: United States
- Colour: Bay
- Breeder: Tartan Stable
- Owner: Sheikh Mohammed
- Trainer: Gary F. Jones
- Record: 12: 4-3-1
- Earnings: $754,419

Major wins
- NYRA Mile (1990); San Diego Handicap (1990)

Quiet American (April 29, 1986 – October 14, 2016) was an American thoroughbred racehorse foaled in Florida. He was out of the Dr. Fager mare Demure, by the Grade I winner Fappiano, son of Mr. Prospector.

Purchased for $300,000 as a yearling at the 1987 Fall Fasig-Tipton Tartan Stable Dispersal Sale by Sheikh Mohammed bin Rashid Al Maktoum, Quiet American was very lightly raced at 2 and 3 and didn't come into his own until age 4, where he won both the NYRA Mile and the San Diego Handicap.

== Stud career ==
Retired to stud at Darley Stud in 1992, Quiet American produced multiple stakes winners, with the most famous being Kentucky Derby winner Real Quiet. In total, he sired over 50 stakes winners with a cumulative earnings of $57 million.

Quiet American is also the sire of:

- 1997 Eclipse Champion Older Dirt Mare Hidden Lake
- Grade 1 winner and Eclipse Champion producer Cara Rafaela
- Grade 1 winner Switch
- Grade 1 winner Seattle Smooth
- Horse of the Year Saint Liam's dam Quiet Dance
- The sturdy millionaire Star Guitar

Quite American was pensioned from stud duty in 2013 and was in full retirement with the likes of Holy Bull and Cherokee Run. He was euthanized on October 14, 2016, at the age of 30. Godolphin's American representative Dan Pride said "To achieve what he did as a racehorse and as a stallion, and then be able to live a long and happy life, is really what one hopes for any horse. His legacy will certainly live on through his sons and daughters. He was such a favorite of ours as well as fans in general. We're all going to miss him".
