= Seventh Street (horse) =

American-bred Thoroughbred racehorse

- Sire: Street Cry
- Grandsire: Machiavellian
- Dam: Holiday Runner
- Damsire: Meadowlake
- Sex: Mare
- Foaled: 2005
- Country: United States
- Colour: Chestnut
- Breeder: Godolphin
- Owner: Godolphin
- Trainer: Saeed bin Suroor
- Record: 9: 5-2-0
- Earnings: $763,020

Major wins
- Go For Wand Handicap (2009); Apple Blossom Handicap (2009)

Seventh Street is a chestnut mare foaled in 2005 out of the sire Street Cry from the Meadowlake dam Holiday Runner, she was bred by Godolphin Stable and is owned by same. Racing for her stables in 2009 the filly burst onto the racing scene winning the grade I Go For Wand Handicap (2009) and Apple Blossom Handicap (2009). She is trained by Saeed bin Suroor
