= Barbara Fritchie Stakes =

- Class: Listed
- Location: Laurel Park Racecourse, Laurel, Maryland, United States
- Inaugurated: 1952
- Race type: Thoroughbred - Flat racing
- Website: www.laurelpark.com

Race information
- Distance: 7 furlongs
- Surface: Dirt
- Track: left-handed
- Qualification: Four-years-old & up, fillies and mares
- Weight: 124 lbs. with allowances
- Purse: $250,000 (since 2019)

The Barbara Fritchie Stakes is an American race for Thoroughbred horses run at Laurel Park Racecourse in February. A Listed event, this race is open to fillies and mares age four and up. It is run at seven furlongs on the dirt and offers a purse of $250,000. Originally a handicap, the race is currently run under allowance weight conditions.

The race is run in honor of Barbara Fritchie, who was an American patriot during the American Civil War. According to legend, Fritchie, a 95-year-old woman at the time, stood in the street and attempted to block or at least antagonize Confederate General Thomas "Stonewall" Jackson and his troops by waving the Union flag as they marched through Frederick, Maryland, on their campaign to the Battle of Gettysburg.

The Barbara Fritchie Handicap was run at Bowie Race Course in Bowie, Maryland, from 1952 to 1984 before being moved to its present location at Laurel Park. The race was a grade 3 race from 1973 to 1991 before being upgraded to grade 2 status for the 1992 running. The race was not held in 1960, 1972 and 2006. Its distance was six furlongs from 1957 to 1959 and 1963, and it was run at one mile in 1961. Tosmah won this race in 1966. The race was downgraded to Grade III status in 2019.

The race was run in two divisions in 1982, 1984 and 1985.

In 2025 the event was downgraded by the Thoroughbred Owners and Breeders Association to Listed status.

== Records ==
Speed record:

- 7 furlongs - 1:21.40 - Tappiano (1989)
- 6 furlongs - 1:10.80 - All Brandy (1963) and Tinkalero (1958)
- 1 1/16 miles - 1:44.80 - Sotto Voce (1954)

Most wins by an horse:

- 2 - Xtra Heat (2002 & 2003);
- 2 - Twixt (1974 & 1975);
- 2 - Skipat (1979 & 1981)

Most wins by a jockey:

- 4 - Donnie Miller Jr. (1982, 1984, 1984, 1985)

Most wins by a trainer:

- 3 - J. Bowes Bond (1952, 1958, 1970)
- 3 - Katharine Voss (1974, 1975, 1992)

Most wins by an owner:

- 2 - nine different owners are tied with two wins each

== Winners ==
Year	Winner	Age	Jockey	Trainer	Owner	Dist. (Furlongs)	Time	Purse	Gr.<be>
2023	Swayin to and Fro	4	Richard Monterrey	Mario Serey Jr.	Baxter Racing Stable	7 F	1:23.75	250,000	III
2022	Glass Ceiling	5	Dylan Davis	Charlton Baker	Charlton Baker and Michael S Foster	7 F	1:23.82	250,000	III
2021	Hibiscus Punch	6	Horacio Karamanos	Justin J. Nixon	Ed Seltzer & Bev Anderson	7 F	1:23.16	$250,000	III
2020	Majestic Reason	5	Trevor McCarthy	H. Graham Motion	Hillwood Stable & R. Golden	7 F	1:23.35	$250,000	III
2019	Late Night Pow Wow	4	Fredy Peltroche	Javier Contreras	Breeze Easy, LLC	7 F	1:21.61	$250,000	III
2018	Ms Locust Point	4	Jorge Vargas Jr.	John Servis	Cash is King	7 F	1:24.13	$300,000	II
2017	High Ridge Road	5	Horacio Karamanos	Linda L. Rice	Martin S. Schwartz	7 F	1:22.50	$300,000	II
2016	Dancing House	5	Kendrick Carmouche	Kiaran McLaughlin	Godolphin Racing	7 F	1:25.23	$300,000	II
2015	Lady Sabelia	5	Horacio Karamanos	Robin Graham	Mrs. Frank Wright	7 F	1:23.14	$300,000	II
2014	My Wandy's Girl	5	Rajiv Maragh	Michael Hushion	Guillermo Berrios	7 F	1:23.79	$300,000	II
2013	Funnys Approval	4	Juan P. Vargas	Jose L. Lopez	Bobby R. Rankin	7 F	1:25.29	$250,000	II
2012	Magical Feeling	6	Robby Albarado	Allen Iwinski	Peter E. Blum	7 F	1:22.36	$200,000	II
2011	Harissa	4	Ramon Dominguez	Michael Hushion	GEM, Inc.	7 F	1:23.65	$150,000	II
2010	Sweet Goodbye	5	J. D. Acosta	Christopher Grove	William R. Harris	7 F	1:21.81	$150,000	II
2009	Royale Michele	4	Geovany Garcia	Matthew Kintz	Sam Pollock	7 F	1:23.64	$200,000	II
2008	Golden Dawn	4	Channing Hill	Michael Hushion	Marty Cunningham	7 F	1:23.64	$200,000	II
2007	Oprah Winney	4	Mike E. Smith	Anthony Dutrow	Sanford Goldfarb	7 F	1:23.64	$200,000	II
2006	no race								
2005	Cativa	5	Edgar Prado	Richard Dutrow	Manorwood Stables	7 F	1:23.64	$200,000	II
2004	Bear Fan	5	Ryan Fogelsonger	Wesley A. Ward	P. Fan & W. Ward	7 F	1:23.55	$200,000	II
2003	Xtra Heat	5	Rick Wilson	John E. Salzman Sr.	John E. Salzman Sr.	7 F	1:24.76	$200,000	II
2002	Xtra Heat	5	Harry Vega	John E. Salzman Sr.	John E. Salzman Sr.	7 F	1:22.70	$200,000	II
2001	Prized Stamp	4	Travis Dunkelberger	Dale Capuano	William A. Sorokolit	7 F	1:23.74	$200,000	II
2000	Tap To Music	5	Joe Bravo	Joe Orseno	Frank Stronach	7 F	1:24.75	$200,000	II
1999	Passeggiata	6	Mario Pino	A. Ferris Allen III	Burning Day Farms	7 F	1:23.55	$250,000	II
1998	J J's Dream	5	Larry C. Reynolds	Edward Plesa, Jr.	John A. Franks	7 F	1:24.21	$250,000	II
1997	Miss Golden Circle	5	Richard Migliore	John C. Kimmel	Kimmel & Solondz	7 F	1:23.05	$250,000	II
1996	Lottsa Talc	6	Frank T. Alvarado	Thomas D. Kelly	Vincent McGuire	7 F	1:22.61	$200,000	II
1995	Smart 'n Noble	4	Mario Pino	Richard Delp	Nickel's Stable	7 F	1:24.13	$200,000	II
1994	Mixed Appeal	6	Austreberto Salazar	Dean Gaudet	Israel Cohen	7 F	1:23.31	$200,000	II
1993	Moon Mist	4	Thomas G. Turner	Wray Lawrence	Barlee Farms	7 F	1:23.50	$200,000	II
1992	Wood So	5	Mario Pino	Katharine Voss	John A. Franks	7 F	1:24.56	$200,000	II
1991	Fappaburst	4	Angel Cordero Jr.	Philip Johnson	Susan Kaskel	7 F	1:23.30	$200,000	II
1990	Amy Be Good	4	Mike E. Smith	Thomas D. Kelly	David P. Reynolds	7 F	1:23.40	$200,000	II
1989	Tappiano	5	Kent Desormeaux	Flint Schulhofer	Frances A. Genter	7 F	1:21.40	$200,000	II
1988	Psyched	5	Kent Desormeaux	Barclay Tagg	Russell B. Jones	7 F	1:22.60	$200,000	II
1987	Spring Beauty	4	José A. Santos	Bruce N. Levine	Glencrest Farm	7 F	1:25.40	$135,420	II
1986	Willowy Mood	4	Buck Thornburg	Ron McAnally	Verne Winchell	7 F	1:25.40	$123,660	II
1985	Dumdedumdedum	4	Donnie Miller Jr.	Mel W. Gross	Allen E. Paulson	7 F	1:25.00	$146,655	II
1985	Flip's Pleasure	5	Jean-Luc Samyn	H. Allen Jerkens	Hobeau Farm	7 F	1:24.00	$146,655	II
1984	Pleasure Cay	4	Donnie Miller Jr.	Neil D. Drysdale	William S. Kilroy	7 F	1:22.80	$93,875	II
1984	Bara Lass	5	Donnie Miller Jr.	D. Wayne Lukas	Sam Ed Stevens	7 F	1:24.00	$93,875	II
1983	Stellarette	5	Alberto Delgado	Mel W. Gross	Frank Stronach	7 F	1:24.40	$123,850	II
1982	Lady Dean	4	Donnie Miller Jr.	Ronald Alfano	David Reynolds	7 F	1:24.20	$77,950	II
1982	The Wheel Turns	5	Greg McCarron	Rusty Arnold	David Greathouse	7 F	1:23.60	$77,950	II
1981	Skipat	7	James W. Edwards	Leon Blusiewicz	Constance P. Beler	7 F	1:23.00	$121,440	II
1980	Misty Gallore	4	Don MacBeth	Thomas J. Kelly	Spring Hill Stable	7 F	1:23.60	$92,950	II
1979	Skipat	6	James W. Edwards	Leon Blusiewicz	Constance P. Beler	7 F	1:22.40	$89,590	II
1978	Bold Brat	5	James W. Mosely	Carlos A. Garcia	Boginod Farm	7 F	1:23.40	$62,290	II
1977	Mt. Airy Queen	4	Danny Ray Wright	Leslie G. Glazier	Leslie G. Glazier	7 F	1:23.80	$60,450	II
1976	Donetta	5	James W. Mosely	Carlos A. Garcia	Herman Kossow	7 F	1:24.60	$62,940	II
1975	Twixt	6	William Passmore	Katharine Voss	Mrs. John Franklin	7 F	1:25.40	$63,915	II
1974	Twixt	5	William Passmore	Katharine Voss	Mrs. John Franklin	7 F	1:24.40	$63,915	II
1973	First Bloom	5	Avelino Gomez	Gerald Sweeney	Lucien Chen	7 F	1:23.40	$63,375	II
1972	no race								
1971	Cold Comfort	4	Mike Venezia	Willard Freeman	Alfred G. Vanderbilt	7 F	1:23.60	$64,500	
1970	Process Shot	4	Larry Adams	J. Bowes Bond	Elberon Farm	7 F	1:23.60	$64,500	
1969	Too Bald	5	Manuel Ycaza	William Stephens	Cain Hoy Stable	7 F	1:23.80	$63,150	
1968	Too Bald	4	Manuel Ycaza	William Stephens	Cain Hoy Stable	7 F	1:21.80	$63,150	
1967	Holly-O.	4	Frank Lovato	Robert Camac	Guy H. Burt	7 F	1:21.80	$63,150	
1966	Tosmah	5	Sam Boulmetis Sr.	Joseph W. Mergler	Briardale Farm (Anthony Imbesi)	7 F	1:23.40	$63,150	
1965	Basking	7	Oliver Cutshaw	Hirsch Jacobs	Dennis Noviello	7 F	1:25.00	$37,250	
1964	Pams Ego	4	Ronnie Ferraro	J. P. Sammy Smith	Clear Springs Stab.	7 F	1:24.40	$37,250	
1963	All Brandy	4	Sam Boulmetis Sr.	E. B. Ryan	John A. Manfuso	6 F	1:10.80	$29,000	
1962	Call Card	5	Joe Culmone	Horace A. Jones	Calumet Farm	7 F	1:25.60	$29,000	
1961	Sun Glint	4	Johnny Sellers	Horace A. Jones	Calumet Farm	8 F	1:40.20	$29,000	
1960	no race								
1959	Tinkalero	6	Art Sherman	Jake B. Dodson	John J. Monaco	6 F	1:10.80	$29,000	
1958	Movitave	3	Nick Shuk	J. Bowes Bond	Knollwood Stable	6 F	1:13.60	$30,000	
1957	Solar System	6	Jim Lynch	Tom Taaffe	Louis L. Voigt Jr.	6 F	1:12.00	$31,000	
1956	Sometime Thing	4	Eric Guerin	Jim Fitzsimmons	Alfred G. Vanderbilt	7 F	1:22.80	$31,000	
1955	Guayana	4	Walter Blum	Harry Trotsek	Lily-Ann Stable	7 F	1:24.40	$31,000	
1954	Sotto Voce	3	Walter Blum	Jim Fitzsimmons	Mrs. Louis Lazare	8.5 F	1:44.80	$18,000	
1953	Sunshine Nell	5	Hedley Woodhouse	William Winfrey	Meyer J. Kaplan	8.5 F	1:46.20	$25,000	
1952	Singing Beauty	3	Nick Shuk	J. Bowes Bond	Mrs. Samuel M. Pistorio	8.5 F	1:51.60	$25,000	

== See also ==
- Barbara Fritchie Handicap "top three finishers" and starters
