= Safely Kept =

American-bred Thoroughbred racehorse

- Sire: Horatius
- Grandsire: Proudest Roman
- Dam: Safely Home
- Damsire: Winning Hit
- Sex: Mare
- Foaled: 1986
- Country: United States
- Colour: Bay
- Breeder: Mr. & Mrs. David Hayden
- Owner: Barry Weisbord
- Trainer: Alan E. Goldberg
- Record: 31: 24-3-3
- Earnings: $2,194,206

Major wins
- Playpen Stakes (1988); Smart Angle Stakes (1988); Test Stakes (1989); Maryland Million Distaff Handicap (1989, 1990, 1991); Columbia Stakes (1989); Genuine Risk Handicap (1989, 1990, 1991); Prioress Stakes (1989); Politely Stakes (1989); Garden State Handicap (1989, 1990, 1991); Regret Stakes (1989); Thoroughbred Club of America Stakes (1990); Meadowlands Handicap (1990, 1991); Garden State Stakes (1989); Finger Lakes Stakes (1990); Chicago Handicap (1991) Breeders' Cup wins: Breeders' Cup Sprint (1990)

Awards
- U.S. Champion Sprinter (1989)

Honours
- Safely Kept Stakes at Laurel Park; US Racing Hall of Fame (2011)

Safely Kept (April 7, 1986 – April 22, 2014) was a Maryland-bred Bay thoroughbred filly sired by Horatius. Safely Kept began her career in 1988 and won 24 of her 31 starts over the next three years. Most of her runs were against colts and geldings as at the time there were few sprint races restricted to females. She finished "in-the-money" in 30 of 31 starts. Safely Kept was euthanized the morning of April 22, 2014 for due to the infirmities of old age. She was 28 years old.

== Two and Three year-old seasons ==
As a two-year-old, she won four of five races including two stakes races in the Playpen Stakes and the Smart Angle Stakes. At age three, she separated herself from every other sprinter in North America by recording eight wins in nine races. That year (1989), she entered the Breeders' Cup Sprint as the second choice in the morning line and finished second to Ogden Phipps' Dancing Spree. Among her eight stakes wins in 1989 were the grade one Test Stakes at Saratoga Race Course and two wins in grade two races, the Genuine Risk Handicap and the Prioress Stakes. Those performances as well as her 9-8-1-0 record that year earned her the Eclipse Award for the American Champion Sprint Horse.

== Four-year-old season ==
At age four, she won all seven of her starts, which all came in stakes races. The final race of her four-year-old season was a victory over a star-studded international field of 14 sprinters in the grade one Breeders' Cup Sprint. That win over super stars Dayjur from England and Black Tie Affair from Ireland as well as reversing the previous year's form as she defeated Dancing Spree by nine and a half lengths.

== Five-year-old season ==
At age, five Safely Kept won five of seven races and finished third in the other two. She ran in the same stakes races at the same tracks that she had in the two previous years. She three-peated in the grade two Genuine Risk Handicap, three-peated in the Maryland Million Distaff Handicap, three-peated in the grade three Garden Stakes Handicap (no longer run), and repeated in the grade three Meadowlands Handicap. Safely Kept also won the Chicago Handicap at Arlington Park and contested in the grade one Frank J. De Francis Memorial Dash Stakes, where she finished third to Housebuster.

== Career Earnings ==
Safely Kept's career bankroll of $2,194,206 ranks her as the greatest earner among any filly or mare bred in the state of Maryland. She is one of only five multi-millionaire Thoroughbred foaled in the state after Cigar, Awad, Concern, and Broad Brush. At the time of her retirement, Safely Kept had earned more than any other female horse in the world bred outside the state of Kentucky except for Lady's Secret and still ranks fourth on that list.

== Honors ==
Laurel Park Racecourse renamed a Graded stakes race in her honor. Safely Kept won the 1989 running of the Columbia Stakes, and in 1990 the race was renamed and given graded stakes status for the first time. The stakes upgrade has been credited to the level of competition that has run in the race, but in large part the upgrade is due to the fact that Safely Kept went on to win the Breeders' Cup Sprint. The Safely Kept Stakes is run annually on the same card as the Frank J. De Francis Memorial Dash Stakes. A second stakes race, the Safely Kept Stakes at Arlington Park, was named after her in honor of her 7 3/4 length victory in the Chicago Handicap in 1991.

In May 2011, she was elected to the US Racing Hall of Fame.
