= Genuine Risk Handicap =

The Genuine Risk Handicap is a race for thoroughbred race horses, open to fillies and mares age three and up. The race is run each spring at six furlongs on the dirt at Belmont Park in New York and offers a purse of $150,000.

The Grade II Genuine Risk is named after the second filly of only three to win the Kentucky Derby in 1980. Genuine Risk was inducted into the National Museum of Racing and Hall of Fame in 1986. In the Blood-Horse magazine List of the Top 100 Racehorses of the 20th Century, she was ranked #91.

In December 2006, the New York Racing Association {NYRA} announced the elimination of this race beginning in 2007 due to its poor placement on the Breeder's Cup Sprint run-up schedule.

== Past winners ==
Some past winners of the Genuine Risk Handicap are:

- 2006 - Behaving Badly (Victor Espinoza)
- 2005 - Bank Audit
- 2002 - Bear Fan
- 2003 - Shine Again
- 2002 - Xtra Heat (Harry Vega)
- 2001 - Katz Me If You Can
- 1992 - Wide Country
- 1991 - Safely Kept
- 1990 - Safely Kept
- 1989 - Safely Kept
