= Twixt Stakes =

- Class: Ungraded Stakes
- Location: Laurel Park Racecourse, Laurel, Maryland, United States
- Inaugurated: 1978
- Race type: Thoroughbred - Flat racing
- Website: www.laurelpark.com

Race information
- Distance: 7 furlongs
- Surface: Dirt
- Track: left-handed
- Qualification: Fillies; Three-years-old
- Weight: Assigned
- Purse: $75,000

The Twixt Stakes is an American Thoroughbred horse race held annually in November at Laurel Park Racecourse in Laurel, Maryland. It is a restricted stakes race open to Maryland-bred fillies three years old and up and is run at seven furlongs on the dirt.

An ungraded stakes race, it offers a purse of $75,000 as of 2017. The race was named in honor of the filly Twixt, a Maryland-bred Champion each year that she raced, from 1972 through 1975. Mrs. John M. Franklin, Mr. and Mrs. John Merryman, and themselves owned her. She had the highest career earnings of any mare bred in Maryland when she retired, totaling $699,143. She was Maryland-bred "Horse-of-the-Year" in 1973 and 1974. Twixt started in 71 races, and her 18 stakes wins (including the Barbara Fritchie Handicap twice) were also a Maryland-bred record when she retired. Twixt was born in 1969 out of the Restless Native mare Quarter Deck, who was bred by the Merrymans. She was trained by the Merrymans' daughter, Katherine (Katy) Merryman Voss.

== Records ==
Speed record:

- 1 mile - 1:37.00 - Les Ry Leigh (2006)
- 1 1/16 miles - 1:43.40 - Blue Sky Princess (1995)
- 1 1/8 miles - 1:48.40 - Valay Maid (1990), River Cruise (2003)

Most wins by a jockey:

- 4 - Mario Pino (1987, 1995, 1996, 1999)

Most wins by a trainer:

- 4 - Richard W. Small (1992, 1993, 2004, 2008)

== Winners ==
Year	Winner	Age	Jockey	Trainer	Owner	Dist. (miles) (furlongs)	Time	Purse	Gr.
2017	Shimmering Aspen	3	Steve Hamilton	Rodney Jenkins	Hillwood Stable LLC	7 f	1:22.72	$75,000	
2016	no race								
2015	no race								
2014	Aunt Ellen	3	Horacio Kanamanos	A. Ferris Allen III	Hickory Ridge Farm LLC	1 1/16 m	1:49.39	$75,000	
2013	no race								
2012	no race								
2011	Access to Charlie	3	Jeremy Rose	Lawrence E. Murray	Sondra D. Bender	1 m	1:39.44	$60,000	
2010	Catch a Thief	3	Harry Vega	Tim Hills	Charles Dimino’s	1 m	1:38.35	$50,000	
2009	Five Diamonds	3	Harry Vega	John Salzman Jr.	William Inman & Ralph Patten	1 m	1:37.89	$50,000	
2008	Hartigan	3	Jozbin Santana	Richard W. Small	Rob Meyerhoff & Fitzhugh	1 m	1:38.09	$70,000	
2007	Paying Off	3	Oliver Castillo	John J. Robb	Morgan W. Wayson Jr.	1 m	1:41.00	$50,000	
2006	Les Ry Leigh	3	Anna R. Napravnik	J. Larry Jones	Michael Pressley	1 m	1:37.00	$75,000	
2005	Promenade Girl	3	Jeremy Rose	Lawrence E. Murray	Sondra & Howard Bender	1 m	1:38.40	$70,000	
2004	He Loves Me	3	Jozbin Santana	Richard W. Small	Buckingham Farm	1 1/8 m	1:51.00	$75,000	
2003	River Cruise	3	Jeremy Rose	Lawrence E. Murray	Sondra & Howard Bender	1 1/8 m	1:48.40	$75,000	
2002	True Sensation	3	Jeremy Rose	Hamilton A. Smith	Hickory Plains Farm	1 1/8 m	1:54.00	$75,000	
2001	Your Out	3	Ramon Dominguez	H. Graham Motion	Eugene F. Ford	1 1/8 m	1:52.40	$75,000	
2000	Steppedoutofadream	3	Rick Wilson	Edward T. Allard	Dr. Philip J. Torsney Jr	1 1/8 m	1:53.40	$100,000	III
1999	Carnival Court	3	Mario Pino	Katherine M. Voss	not yet found	1 1/8 m	1:51.20	$100,000	III
1998	Merengue	3	Mark T. Johnston	Donald H. Barr	Gerald C. Dickens	1 1/16 m	1:45.00	$100,000	III
1997	Snit	3	Edgar Prado	Barclay Tagg	William M. Backer	1 1/16 m	1:44.60	$100,000	III
1996	Proper Angel	3	Mario Pino	John W. Hicks III	not yet found	1 1/16 m	1:44.20	$100,000	III
1995	Blue Sky Princess	3	Mario Pino	Robin L. Graham	Frank P. Wright	1 1/16 m	1:43.40	$100,000	III
1994	Churchbell Chimes	3	Alberto Delgado	J. William Boniface	Susan Y. Granville	1 1/16 m	1:43.60	$100,000	III
1993	Broad Gains	3	Edgar Prado	Richard W. Small	Robert E. Meyerhoff	1 1/8 m	1:49.80	$100,000	III
1992	Star Minister	3	Andrea Seefeldt	Richard W. Small	Robert E. Meyerhoff	1 1/8 m	1:51.20	$100,000	III
1991	Wide Country	3	Santos Chavez	Robert W. Camac	Thomas Tanner	1 1/8 m	1:50.20	$100,000	III
1990	Valay Maid	3	Edgar Prado	Carlos A Garcia	Mr. & Mrs. A. J. Hamilton	1 1/8 m	1:48.40	$100,000	III
1989	Under Oath	3	Joe Rocco		Y. J. Stoner	1 1/8 m	1:49.80	$75,000	
1988	Ice Tech	3	Kent Desormeaux			1 1/8 m	1:50.60	$80,000	
1987	Angelina County	3	Mario Pino			1 1/8 m	1:49.80	$90,000	
1986	Smart n' Quick	3	Alberto Delgado			1 1/8 m	1:52.00	$90,000	
1985	no race								
1984	Slip of the Tongue	3	Jack Kaenel		Mrs. Geri Forrester	1 1/16 m	1:45.40	$25,000	
1983	First Quad	3	William Passmore			1 1/16 m	1:46.00	$25,000	
1982	Gallant Risk	3	Jack Kaenel			1 1/16 m	1:47.20	$25,000	
1981	Dance Forth	3	Phil Grove		Dr. Thomas Bowman	1 1/16 m	1:46.40	$30,000	
1980	Caught in Amber	3	Danny Ray Wright		O'Brien Brothers	1 1/16 m	1:46.60	$35,000	
1979	Lady Lyndy	3	Vincent Bracciale Jr.		John B. Merryman	1 1/16 m	1:47.80	$20,000	
1978	Red Lamp	3	Phil Grove		Mr. & Mrs. C. Oliver Goldsmith	1 1/16 m	1:45.80	$20,000	

== See also ==
- Twixt Stakes top three finishers and starters
- Laurel Park Racecourse
