= Pimlico Oaks =

Former horse race held at Pimlico Race Course in Maryland, US

The Pimlico Oaks was a listed Thoroughbred horse race at Pimlico Race Course in Baltimore, Maryland. Run at the beginning of April at a distance of 1 1/16 miles on dirt, its purse was $200,000.

Another Pimlico Oaks was raced in 1919 but was changed in 1952 to become the Black-Eyed Susan Stakes.

== Winners ==
- 1991 - Wide Country
- 1990 - Stacies Toy
- 1989 - Open Mind
