= Eugene Mori =

American racetrack owner (1898–1975)

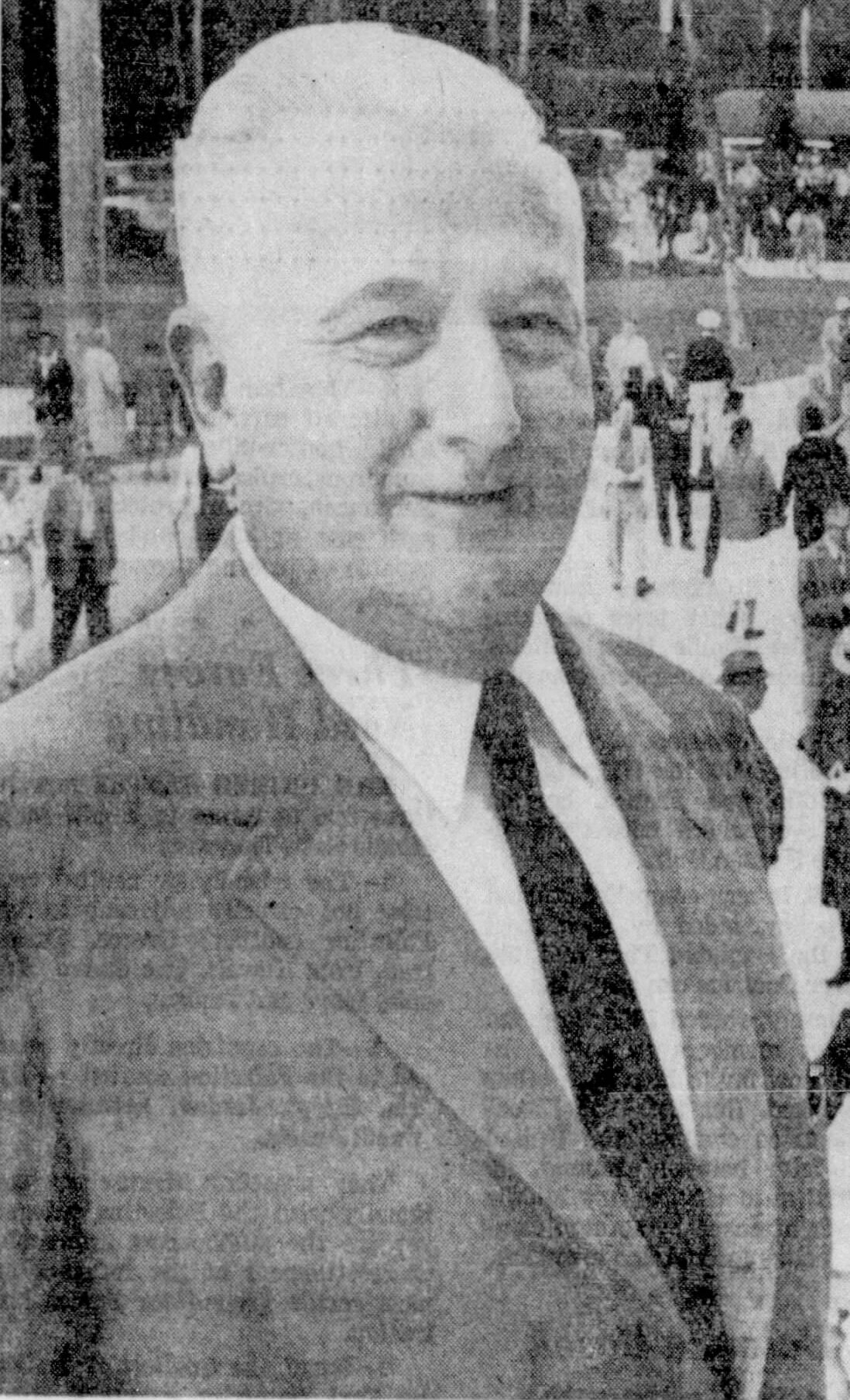
Mori in 1958

Eugene V. Mori (March 4, 1898 – October 8, 1975) was an American racetrack owner and real estate developer, known for his ownership of Garden State Racetrack, Hialeah Park Race Track and the Tanforan Racetrack, as well as a number of businesses that led to the growth and eventually the name of Cherry Hill, New Jersey.

== Early life ==
Mori, the son of Italian immigrants from Poviglio, was born on March 4, 1898 and raised in Vineland, New Jersey, as part of a poor family that had to make do with purchasing broken spaghetti in order to save money.

== Business career ==
Mori sought a state license for a race track and raised the million dollars in 1939 by soliciting stock sales to individuals in person, one at a time. He was granted the approval and built Garden State Racetrack on a 268-acre (108 ha) site in what was then known as Delaware Township, New Jersey.

Mori bought additional tracts of land near the track and branded several properties in Delaware Township using the Cherry Hill name, starting with the Cherry Hill Inn and Cherry Hill Lodge hotels. Cherry Hill Shopping Center (since renamed as Cherry Hill Mall) opened in 1961 opposite the old Cherry Hill Farm site, featuring 75 stores in a single enclosed space. It was these businesses that helped lead the suburban growth in the area and ultimately became the community's namesake when it was renamed as Cherry Hill Township.

When the community tried to get a post office of its own starting in 1959, the existence of another municipality that shared the same name—Delaware Township, Hunterdon County, New Jersey—meant that a new name had to be chosen. Among other proposed names, Deltown was the most likely choice and was almost officially chosen, until Mori had his public relations person push for the name Cherry Hill, as part of an effort to promote Mori's businesses. It worked, and voters approved the name change in November 1961.

== Death ==
A longtime resident of Moorestown, New Jersey, Mori died at a nursing facility in Medford, New Jersey, on October 8, 1975.
