= Harry Vega =

American jockey (born 1965)

Personal information
- Born: September 21, 1965 (age 60) New Brunswick, New Jersey, United States
- Occupation: Jockey

Horse racing career
- Sport: Horse racing
- Career wins: 4,000+ (ongoing)

Major racing wins
- Empire Classic Handicap (2001); Pennsylvania Governor's Cup Stakes (2001); Barbara Fritchie Handicap (2002); Endine Stakes (2002); Genuine Risk Handicap (2002); Interborough Handicap (2002); Phoenix Breeders' Cup Stakes (2002); Red Bank Stakes (2002); Vagrancy Handicap (2002); Overskate Stakes (2004); Maryland Million Distaff Handicap (2005); Pennsylvania Oaks (2005); Violet Stakes (2005); Gallant Bob Handicap (2007); Conniver Stakes (2009); Henry S. Clark Stakes (2009); Marshua Stakes (2010)

Significant horses
- Xtra Heat

Harry Vega (born September 21, 1965 in New Brunswick, New Jersey) is an American jockey in Thoroughbred horse racing.

Vega began his riding career in Michigan in 1983 then in the late 1980s moved to compete at tracks on the Northeast coast of the United States. A winner of more than 3,500 races in his career to date, in 2006 his 22.7 winning percentage was ninth best among all jockeys in the United States.

Harry Vega is best known as the jockey of Xtra Heat. Aboard the filly, he in 2002 he won the Barbara Fritchie Handicap, the Genuine Risk Handicap and Vagrancy Handicap and the Endine Stakes at Delaware Park Racetrack.

After Vega married fellow jockey Amy Duross they were banned by Suffolk Downs officials from riding in the same race until the Massachusetts State Racing Commission ruled they could. Vega now has 2 children with Duross, 15 year old Devin Vega and 13 Year old Tyler Vega.

Chart (2000–present)	Peak position
National Earnings List for Jockeys 2000	75
National Earnings List for Jockeys 2001	40
National Earnings List for Jockeys 2002	71
National Earnings List for Jockeys 2004	99
National Earnings List for Jockeys 2005	65
National Earnings List for Jockeys 2006	91
National Earnings List for Jockeys 2007	49
National Earnings List for Jockeys 2008	100
National Earnings List for Jockeys 2009	78
National Earnings List for Jockeys 2010	87
