= Salt It =

American-bred Thoroughbred racehorse

- Sire: Salt Lake
- Grandsire: Deputy Minister
- Dam: Let It Fly
- Damsire: Hatchet Man
- Sex: Mare
- Foaled: 1994
- Country: United States
- Colour: Gray
- Breeder: Jones John T. L. Jr.
- Owner: Deborah Bodner
- Trainer: Deborah Bodner
- Record: 20: 4-1-1
- Earnings: $265,380

Major wins
- Black-Eyed Susan Stakes (1997); Wide Country Stakes (1998)
- Last updated on June 25, 2011

Salt It (foaled in 1994 in Kentucky) is an American Thoroughbred racehorse. The daughter of Salt Lake and Let It Fly is probably remembered for winning the mile and an eighth Grade II $200,000 Black-Eyed Susan Stakes at Pimlico Race Course on May 16, 1997.

== Racing career ==
Salt It was purchased for $14,000 at the 1996 Timonium Sale. After breaking her maiden in her second start in November 1996, she won an allowance race in late January 1997 at Laurel Park Racecourse. In March, she was entered in her first stakes race in the Wide Country Stakes at Laurel Park at a mile and an eighth on the dirt. In the Wide Country, she won going away by six lengths over Smart Erin and Suspicious Lady. Her final time in her third straight win was 1:51.20 under jockey Carlos Marquez Jr. She was trained by her owner, Deborah Bodner, who then entered her in the second jewel of the de facto filly Triple Crown, the Grade II $200,000 Black-Eyed Susan Stakes on May 16, 1997. In that mile and an eighth race on the dirt, Salt It beat a field of seven, including stakes winners Buckeye Search and Holiday Ball.

The final time for the nine furlong Black-Eyed Susan was 1:50.52 under her regular rider Marquez. Later that year, Salt It finished third in two other stakes races, including the grade two Cotillion Handicap at Philadelphia Park behind Snit and Proud Run. She also finished third in the Stormy Blues Breeders' Cup Stakes at Pimlico Race Course, which Holiday Ball won. Salt It suffered a minor injury in the winter of 1998 and was freshened for several months. After her rehabilitation, she came back to the track but was not the same. After half a dozen attempts, Bodner retired her. Salt It finished her racing career with four wins and a record of 4-1-1 out of 11 starts with earnings of $265,380.
