= Sweetnorthernsaint =

American-bred Thoroughbred racehorse

- Sire: Sweetsouthernsaint
- Grandsire: Saint Ballado
- Dam: Ice Beauty
- Damsire: Waquoit
- Sex: Gelding
- Foaled: 2003
- Country: United States
- Color: Bay
- Breeder: Eduardo Azpurura
- Owner: Glencrest Farm
- Trainer: Michael Trombetta
- Record: 25: 8-5-3
- Earnings: $947,632

Major wins
- Miracle Wood Stakes (2006); Illinois Derby (2006); Odessa Stakes (2006); Harrison Johnson Memorial Handicap (2007); Primal Stakes (2008); Wadsworth Memorial Handicap (2009)
- Last updated on February 28, 2016

Sweetnorthernsaint is a Thoroughbred race horse. A Florida foal of March 2003, he was a top contender for the Triple Crown in 2006. Late in his two-year-old season, he was very hard to handle, so his owners had him gelded. He lost his only start as a two-year-old, finishing 12th in a maiden race on the turf at Colonial Downs.

== Three-year-old season ==
In his three-year-old season, Sweetnorthernsaint trained at Laurel Park Racecourse in Maryland for trainer Michael Trombetta. He broke his maiden at Laurel in his first race of the year but was disqualified and placed fourth. He then shipped to Aqueduct Racecourse and won a second higher purse maiden race and then went straight into stakes races. Sweetnorthernsaint broke the stakes record in the Miracle Wood Stakes at Laurel Park Racecourse, winning by ten lengths over his eight rivals. In the Gotham Stakes, he was too keen early and finished third. At Chicago's speed-favoring Hawthorne Race Course, Sweetnorthernsaint won the $500,000 grade two Illinois Derby by 9 ½ lengths as he passed pacesetting Mister Triester at the top of the stretch, stamping his ticket for the Kentucky Derby. He completed the 1-1/8-mile assignment in 1 minute and 49 4/5 seconds to earn the winner's share of $300,000 for owners Joseph J. Balsamo and Ted Theos. The race earned him a 107 Beyer Speed Figure, which was the highest recorded that year by a three-year-old.

As the gates opened, Sweetnorthernsaint assumed the role as post-time favorite in the Kentucky Derby. He was close to the lead on a very fast pace. Barbaro, winner of the Florida Derby, won by six lengths as Sweetnorthernsaint faded to sixth in the full field of twenty colts.

Two weeks later in the second jewel of the Triple Crown, the Preakness Stakes, Barbaro went off as an odds-on favorite. He broke through the gate prior to the bell and was re-loaded. Less than an eighth mile out of the gate, Barbaro pulled up. Sweetnorthernsaint led for most of the race, but eventual Eclipse champion Bernardini passed him around the far turn and won. Sweetnorthernsaint placed second in front of his home town crowd.

After the Preakness, Sweetnorthernsaint won an allowance race at Laurel and the Odessa Stakes at Delaware Park Racetrack.

== Older seasons ==
As a four-year-old (2007), Sweetnorthernsaint won the H. E. Johnson Memorial Handicap at 9 furlongs at his home track, Laurel Park. He also finished second in the grade three National Jockey Club Handicap at 9 furlongs at Hawthorne, the grade three Lone Star Park Handicap in Grande Prairie, Texas, at 8.5 furlongs, and the grade three Hal's Hope Handicap at 8 furlongs at Gulfstream Park.

In 2008, as a five-year-old, Sweetnorthernsaint won the Primal Stakes at Calder Race Course at 8.5 furlongs. As a six-year-old, the gelding won the 2009 edition of the Wadsworth Memorial Handicap at 9 furlongs at Finger Lakes Race Track.

== Connections ==
Sweetnorthernsaint is owned by Joseph Balsamo and Ted Theos and trained by Michael Trombetta. He is ridden by Kent Desormeaux and was bred in Florida by Eduardo Azpurura.

== Breeding ==
Sweetnorthernsaint is s son of Sweetsouthernsaint, out of the mare Ice Beauty. To date, he has started thirteen times and won six of his races.

== Race Record ==
Track	Race	Distance	Finish
Finger Lakes Race Track	Wadsworth Memorial Handicap	1 1/8 miles	1st
Calder Race Course	Primal Stakes	1 1/16	1st
Laurel Park	Harrison E. Johnson Memorial Handicap	1 1/8	1st
Hawthorne Race Course	National Jockey Club Handicap (Grade 3)	1 1/8	2nd
Lone Star Park	Lone Star Park Handicap (Grade 3)	1 1/16	2nd
Gulfstream Park	Hal's Hope Handicap (Grade 3)	1 mile	2nd
Gulfstream Park	Sunshine Millions Classic	1 1/8	5th
Delaware Park Racetrack	Odessa Stakes	1 1/16	1st
Laurel Park (race track)	Allowance Race	1 1/8	1st
Pimlico Race Course	Preakness Stakes (Grade 1)	1 3/16	2nd
Churchill Downs	Kentucky Derby (Grade 1)	1 1/4	7th
Hawthorne Race Course	Illinois Derby (Grade 2)	1 1/8	1st
Aqueduct Racetrack	Gotham Stakes (Grade 3)	1 1/16	3rd
Laurel Park	Miracle Wood Stakes	1 mile	1st
Aqueduct Racetrack	Maiden	6 furlongs	1st
Laurel Park (race track)	Maiden Claiming	6 furlongs	4th (DQ from 1st)
Colonial Downs	Maiden (turf)	1 mile	12th
