= Wide Country (horse) =

American-bred Thoroughbred racehorse

- Sire: Magesterial
- Grandsire: Northern Dancer
- Dam: Bazooka Babe
- Damsire: Mullineaux
- Sex: Filly
- Foaled: 1988
- Country: United States
- Colour: Chestnut
- Breeder: Diana W. Carlson
- Owner: Tommy Tanner
- Trainer: Robert W. Camac
- Record: 26: 12-5-3
- Earnings: US$881,221

Major wins
- Black-Eyed Susan Stakes (1991); Pimlico Oaks (1991); Caesar's Wish Stakes (1991); Jameela Stakes (1991); Genuine Risk Handicap (1992)

Honours
- Wide Country Stakes at Laurel Park Racecourse
- Last updated on June 17, 2011

Wide Country (foal in 1988) was an American Thoroughbred racehorse who defeated both male and female competitors. She was bred in Maryland by Diana W. Carlson and was a chestnut filly out of the mare Bazooka Babe. Her sire was Magesterial, a multiple stakes winning son of U.S. Racing Hall of Fame inductee Northern Dancer. Wide Country is best remembered for her win in the slop in the Grade II $250,000 Black-Eyed Susan Stakes over stakes winners John's Decision and Nalees Pin on May 17, 1991.

== Early racing career ==
During Wide Country's two-year-old season, she broke her maiden in her second attempt and followed that up with a win in an allowance race at Laurel Park. Late in her freshman year, she won the Smart Angle Stakes, the Maryland Juvenile Filly Championship Stakes and the Heavenly Cause Stakes. In 1991, Tom Tanner's home bred Wide Country proved to be an indomitable force, running a streak to eight straight wins in stakes races mostly at either Pimlico Race Course or Laurel Park Racecourse. The streak began in the final months of 1990 and continued well into 1991. Included in those stakes victories were the Caesar's Wish Stakes, the Genuine Risk Handicap at Belmont Park, the Jameela Stakes, the Flirtation Stakes, the All Brandy Stakes and the Twixt Stakes.

== Black-Eyed Susan Stakes ==
The chestnut filly overcame adversity to win the 67th running of the Grade II $250,000 Black-Eyed Susan Stakes over a muddy race track after losing a shoe. The Black-Eyed Susan, run on the third Friday of May each year, is also called the de facto second jewel of the national "Filly Triple Crown" and is run at a mile and one eighth. Wide Country was listed as the slight morning line favorite at 5-2 just ahead of Do It With Style, who was listed at 3–1. That day, the skies opened with rain, and lightning threatened to push back or cancel the race. In a sea of mud, Wide Country broke midpack in the field of nine fillies. Down the backstretch, she moved three wide and broke open a huge lead. Down the stretch, she struggled with the mud and held on to beat John's Decision by a neck. It was another neck back to Nalee's Pin, who finished third. Wide Country won the race in 1:51.26 and the 60% winner's share of the purse equaling $150,000. At the conclusion of the race, Wide Country's career record stood at ten wins and two seconds in 13 starts.

== Later racing career ==
Later that season, she won the Grade 3 Pimlico Oaks by eight and a half lengths. Wide Country shipped to Belmont Park and Meadowlands for a summer and fall campaign where she turned in victories in the Caesar's Wish Stakes, Genuine Risk Handicap and Jameela Stakes and finished second in the Garden City Breeders' Cup Handicap. Trained by Robert W. Camac, Wide Country captured three more Maryland stakes races at the end of her sophomore season on her way to state-bred championship honors. At year end, she was named Maryland-bred "Horse of the Year" for 1991. At age four, Wide Country had a near miss in the stakes feature on Presidents' Day in 1992, finishing a neck behind the winner in the Barbara Fritchie Handicap at Laurel Park Racecourse. That day, she was closing fast and fell just short at the wire to Wood So in the seven-furlong grade two stakes race. In late April, Wide Country posted her only major victory of the year when she won the Grade II $125,000 Genuine Risk Handicap at Belmont Park in New York over six furlongs on the dirt. In August, she finished third in the Grade I Maskette Stakes (now called the Go For Wand Handicap) to Easy Now over one mile and an eighth race at Aqueduct Racetrack.

== Honors ==
After her retirement, Laurel Park Racecourse named a race in honor, the Wide Country Stakes, which is open to fillies age three years old and up over seven furlongs on the dirt every March.
