= Xtra Heat =

American-bred Thoroughbred racehorse

- Sire: Dixieland Heat
- Grandsire: Dixieland Band
- Dam: Begin
- Damsire: Hatchet Man
- Sex: Mare
- Foaled: 1998
- Died: December 2022 (aged 24)
- Country: United States
- Colour: Bay
- Breeder: Pope McLean, Pope McLean Jr., et al.
- Owner: Kenneth Taylor, Harry Deitchman, John Salzman, Sr.
- Trainer: John E. Salzman, Sr.
- Record: 35: 26-5-2
- Earnings: $2,389,635

Major wins
- Astarita Stakes (2000); Blue Hen Stakes (2000); Beaumont Stakes (2001); Dearly Precious Stakes (2001); Endine Stakes (2001, 2002); Prioress Stakes (2001); Cicada Stakes (2001); Ruthless Stakes(2001); Barbara Fritchie Handicap (2002, 2003); Vagrancy Handicap (2002); Genuine Risk Handicap (2002); Phoenix Stakes (2002); Interborough Handicap (2003)

Awards
- American Champion Three-Year-Old Filly (2001)

Honours
- United States Racing Hall of Fame inductee (2015)

Xtra Heat (March 3, 1998—December 2022) was an American Thoroughbred Champion racehorse and broodmare. Despite competing almost exclusively at sprint distances, she was named American Champion Three-Year-Old Filly at the Eclipse Awards for 2001. She was inducted into the National Museum of Racing & Hall of Fame in 2015.

== Background ==
Xtra Heat was a bay mare bred in Kentucky by Pope McLean. She was by far the most successful horse sired by the Louisiana Derby winner Dixieland Heat. During her racing career she was owned by Kenneth Taylor, Harry Deitchman, and her trainer, John Salzman, Sr.

== Racing career ==
In 2001, Xtra Heat set a new track record for six furlongs at Pimlico Race Course. Although she ran second by a neck in the 2001 Breeders' Cup Sprint to winner Squirtle Squirt, her performances that year earned Xtra Heat the Eclipse Award as American Champion Three-Year-Old Filly.

Xtra Heat was retired after campaigning in 2003, having won 26 of her 35 lifetime starts and with earnings in excess of $2.3 million.

On November 3, 2002, following the Breeders' Cup, Xtra Heat was auctioned at the Fasig-Tipton November Select Sale. She failed to sell when bidding "stalled" at $1.7 million and was returned to her owners. But on November 5, 2002, it was announced that the ClassicStar partnership (consisting of S. David Plummer, Tony Ferguson, Thom Robinson, and John Parrot) purchased Xtra Heat privately. The price was not disclosed.

== Breeding career ==
Xtra Heat produced 14 foals, 12 of which have raced. Among her successful foals are the Gone West-sired Southwestern Heat, winner of the Sonny Hine Stakes at Laurel, and the Elusive Quality-sired Elusive Heat, who won a restricted stakes race at Saratoga.

== Death ==
In March 2023 Woodford Thoroughbreds announced that Xtra Heat died the previous December at the age of 24.

== Pedigree ==
Pedigree of Xtra Heat
Sire Dixieland Heat	Dixieland Band	Northern Dancer	Nearctic
Sire Dixieland Heat	Dixieland Band	Northern Dancer	Natalma
Sire Dixieland Heat	Dixieland Band	Mississippi Mud	Delta Judge
Sire Dixieland Heat	Dixieland Band	Mississippi Mud	Sand Buggy
Sire Dixieland Heat	Evening Silk	Damascus	Sword Dancer
Sire Dixieland Heat	Evening Silk	Damascus	Kerala
Sire Dixieland Heat	Evening Silk	Fight On	Dark Star
Sire Dixieland Heat	Evening Silk	Fight On	Forward March
Dam Begin	Hatchet Man	The Axe	Mahmoud
Dam Begin	Hatchet Man	The Axe	Blackball
Dam Begin	Hatchet Man	Bebopper	Tom Fool
Dam Begin	Hatchet Man	Bebopper	Bebop
Dam Begin	Crimson Charla	Crimson Satan	Spy Song
Dam Begin	Crimson Charla	Crimson Satan	Papila
Dam Begin	Crimson Charla	Wood Nymph	Deerlands
Dam Begin	Crimson Charla	Wood Nymph	Hukilau

== See also ==
- List of racehorses
