= Mario G. Pino =

American jockey

Personal information
- Born: September 8, 1961 (age 64) Wilmington, Delaware
- Occupation: Jockey

Horse racing career
- Sport: Horse racing
- Career wins: 7,001

Major racing wins
- First Flight Handicap (1984); Violet Handicap (1990); Barbara Fritchie Handicap (1992, 1995, 1999); Maryland Million Classic (1995); Whirlaway Stakes (2002); Busher Stakes (2003); Dearly Precious Stakes (2004, 2008); Obeah Stakes (2004); Victory Ride Stakes (2006); Prioress Breeders' Cup Stakes (2006); Miracle Wood Stakes (2006, 2007); Lane's End Stakes (2007); Lecomte Stakes (2007); Alfred G. Vanderbilt Handicap (2007); King's Bishop Stakes (2007); Kentucky Cup Classic Stakes (2007)

Significant horses
- Sweetnorthernsaint, Hard Spun
- Updated on October 21, 2021

Mario G. Pino (born September 8, 1961) is a retired American jockey who competed in thoroughbred horse racing. Raised on a farm, he began his riding career in 1978 at Delaware Park in Wilmington. Over the years, he has chosen to be based at race tracks close to home and family and has won a number of riding titles at venues in the Delaware, Maryland, and Virginia areas. He rode his first winner aboard Ed's Desire on January 16, 1979, at the now-defunct Bowie Race Track in Bowie, Maryland.

On July 7, 2002, Pino won seven races on a single day at Colonial Downs in New Kent, Virginia, and on October 25, 2003, had a six-win day at Laurel Park Racecourse in Laurel, Maryland. He has twice ridden in the Preakness Stakes, finishing third in 2007 aboard Hard Spun. In his debut in the Kentucky Derby on May 5, 2007, Pino rode the colt to a second-place finish and then was third in the Preakness Stakes. After winning the King's Bishop Stakes and the Kentucky Cup Classic Stakes Pino rode Hard Spun to a second-place finish in that year's Breeders' Cup Classic.

On November 7, 2007, Pino reached 6,000 career wins when he rode Pass Play to victory at Laurel Park Racecourse. On October 20, 2021, he became the tenth jockey in North America to win 7,000 races when his mount Enjoy the Music won a claiming race at Presque Isle Downs & Casino in Pennsylvania. The following day — the closing day of the season at Presque Isle — he told The Blood-Horse that he would retire following that day's races. With one more win at Presque Isle, Pino retired with 7,001 wins and career earnings in excess of $131 million.

== Year-end charts ==
Chart (2000–present)	Peak position
National Earnings List for Jockeys 2000	35
National Earnings List for Jockeys 2001	32
National Earnings List for Jockeys 2002	29
National Earnings List for Jockeys 2003	40
National Earnings List for Jockeys 2004	48
National Earnings List for Jockeys 2005	48
National Earnings List for Jockeys 2006	37
National Earnings List for Jockeys 2007	24
National Earnings List for Jockeys 2008	75
National Earnings List for Jockeys 2009	94
