= John C. Kimmel =

American racehorse trainer (born 1954)

John Kimmel
Personal information
- Born: June 25, 1954 (age 72) East Orange, New Jersey; United States
- Occupation: Trainer

Horse racing career
- Sport: Horse racing
- Career wins: 1,254+ (ongoing)

Major racing wins
- Test Stakes (1994, 1997); First Flight Handicap (1994, 1995); Coaching Club American Oaks (1995); Diana Handicap (1996); Beldame Stakes (1997); Hempstead Handicap (1997); Forego Handicap (1999); Ruffian Handicap (1999); Spinster Stakes (2001); Florida Derby (2004); Mac Diarmida Handicap (2005); Woodward Stakes (2006); Pennsylvania Derby (2007)

Significant horses
- Better Than Honour, Elusive Lady; Hidden Lake, Premium Tap
- Updated on September 30, 2008

John C. Kimmel (born June 25, 1954, in East Orange, New Jersey) is an American thoroughbred racehorse trainer. He holds a pre-med undergraduate degree from the University of Colorado at Boulder and he graduated from the University of Pennsylvania Veterinary School in 1980.
