= Harrison E. Johnson Memorial Handicap =

Harrison E. Johnson Memorial Stakes
- Class: Ungraded Stakes
- Location: Laurel Park Racecourse, Laurel, Maryland, United States
- Inaugurated: 1986
- Race type: Thoroughbred - Flat racing
- Website: www.laurelpark.com

Race information
- Distance: 1 1/8 miles (9 furlongs)
- Surface: Dirt
- Track: left-handed
- Qualification: Three-year-olds & up
- Weight: Assigned
- Purse: $100,000

The Harrison E. Johnson Memorial Stakes is an American Thoroughbred horse race held annually in March at Laurel Park Racecourse in Laurel, Maryland. It is open to three-year-olds and up and is run at 1 1/8 miles (nine furlongs) on the dirt. An ungraded stakes race, it offers a purse of $100,000. The stake will run this year on Saturday, March 17, 2018.

The race was named in honor of African-American trainer Harrison E. Johnson, a Maryland-based trainer who died in 1985 at age 45 in a plane crash along with George F. Griffith while flying from Saratoga Race Course in upstate New York to Virginia. Johnson was piloting the plane. The native of Adelphi, Maryland, had been a trainer since the spring of 1969. His best race horse was Gutsy O'Shay, winner of the 1973 Hopeful Stakes at Saratoga. That gelding was named Maryland-bred two-year-old champion in 1973.

== Records ==
Speed record:

- 1 1/8 miles - 1:48.60 - Ibex (1993)
- 1 3/16 miles - 1:55.80 - Big Rut (1998) & Super Memory (1995)

Most wins by an horse:

- 2 - Due North (1990 & 1991)

Most wins by a jockey:

- 4 - Edgar Prado (1990, 1993, 1996 & 1997)

Most wins by a trainer:

- 2 - H. Graham Motion (2008 & 2009)
- 2 - Mary E. Eppler (1994, 2015)
- 2 - Katherine M. Voss (1990 & 1991)

== Winners of the Harrison E. Johnson Memorial Stakes ==
Year	Winner	Age	Jockey	Trainer	Owner	Dist. (Miles)	Time	Purse$
2022		-				1 1/8	0:00.00	$100,000
2021	Cordmaker	6	Victor R. Carrasco	Rodney Jenkins	Hillwood Stable LLC	1 1/8	1:49.37	$100,000
2020	Senior Investment	6	Emmanuel Esquivel	Scott A. Lake	Richard Malouf	1 1/8	1:50.96	$100,000
2019	Cordmaker	4	Victor R. Carrasco	Rodney Jenkins	Hillwood Stables	1 1/8	1:50.29	$100,000
2018	Something Awesome	7	Edgar Prado	Jose Corrales	Stronach Stables	1 1/8	1:50.86	$100,000
2017	Matt King Coal	4	Victor Carrasco	Linda L. Rice	Lady Shelia Stable	1 1/8	1:51.07	$100,000
2016	Race not held							
2015	Page McKenney	5	Horacio Karamanos	Mary E. Eppler	Staple/Jalin Stable	1 1/8	1:50.88	$100,000
2014	Ground Transport	4	Trevor McCarthy	Michael H. Stidham	West Point Thoroughbreds	1 1/8	1:52.17	$100,000
2013	Norman Asbjornson	5	Jeremy Rose	Christopher Grove	Tom McClay & Harry Nye	1 1/8	1:51.77	$125,000
2012	Eighttofasttocatch	6	Sheldon Russell	Timothy Keefe	Sylvia Heft	1 1/8	1:53.43	$100,000
2011	Eighttofasttocatch	5	Sheldon Russell	Timothy Keefe	Sylvia Heft	1 1/8	1:50.30	$75,000
2010	Indian Dance	4	Luis Garcia	Lawrence Murray	Sondra Bender	1 1/8	1:51.04	$70,000
2009	Bullsbay	5	Jeremy Rose	H. Graham Motion	Mitchell Ranch	1 1/8	1:50.33	$75,000
2008	Arcata	4	Jeremy Rose	H. Graham Motion	Mark Westenhoefer	1 1/8	1:53.00	$60,000
2007	Sweetnorthernsaint	4	Mario Pino	Michael Trombetta	Joe Balsamo & Ted Theos	1 1/8	1:51.20	$75,000
2006	Reckless Ways	5	Anna Napravnik	Edmond Gaudet	Lacey Gaudet	1 1/8	1:50.60	$75,000
2005	Lusty Latin	6	Erick Rodriguez	Mark Shuman	Al Bingel	1 1/8	1:52.00	$50,000
2004	Jorgie Stover	6	Kaymarie Kreidel	John Alecci	Michael Gill	1 1/8	1:49.40	$75,000
2003	P Day	8	Ryan Fogelsonger	Charles Hadry	Cheryl Resch	1 1/8	1:49.40	$75,000
2002	First Amendment	5	Ramon Dominguez	Mark Shuman	Bonita Farm	1 1/8	1:49.20	$50,000
2001	Duckhorn	4	Travis Dunkelberger	Patrick B. Byrne	Windmill Manor Farms	1 1/4	2:00.60	$85,000
2000	S W Clarence	6	Rick Wilson	Thomas Lingenfelter	Springwater Farms	1 3/16	1:56.20	$75,000
1999	Fred Bear Claw	5	Larry Reynolds	Archie Smith, Jr.	J R Stable	1 3/16	1:56.60	$55,000
1998	Big Rut	5	Larry Reynolds	Hamilton Smith	James W. Peters, Jr.	1 3/16	1:55.80	$55,000
1997	Western Echo	5	Edgar Prado	Grover Delp	Xanthus Farm	1 3/16	1:57.20	$75,000
1996	Michael's Star	4	Edgar Prado	Guadalipe Preciado	Hidden Lane Farm	1 3/16	1:56.80	$75,000
1995	Super Memory	5	Omar Klinger	King T. Leatherbury	King T. Leatherbury	1 3/16	1:55.80	$75,000
1994	Local Problem	5	Allen Stacy	Mary E. Eppler	Alfred Gwynne Vanderbilt Jr.	1 1/8	1:49.60	$75,000
1993	Ibex	6	Edgar Prado	Gary Capuano	Dylan Williams	1 1/8	1:48.60	$75,000
1992	Gala Spinaway	4	Greg McCarron	Bernard P. Bond	Gertrude & Skip Leviton	1 1/8	1:51.00	$75,000
1991	Due North	9	Rick Wilson	Katherine M. Voss	Susan McGill	1 1/8	1:51.00	$75,000
1990	Due North	8	Edgar Prado	Katherine M. Voss	Susan McGill	1 1/8	1:51.60	$75,000
1989	Baldski's Choice	5	Greg McCarron	Bernard P. Bond	Arnold & Sylvia E. Heft	1 1/8	1:51.00	$57,500
1988	Entertain	5	Vincent Bracciale		Kumpe & Pullen	1 1/8	1:51.60	$60,000
1987	Midnight Call	4	Mario Pino		William M. Backer	1-mile	1:37.20	$60,000
1986	Sparrowvon	4	Alberto Delgado	Hank Allen	Jacque-Scott Stable	1-mile	1:37.00	$60,000

== See also ==
- Harrison E. Johnson Memorial Handicap top three finishers
- Laurel Park Racecourse
