= Maryland Million Turf Sprint Handicap top three finishers =

This is a listing of the horses that finished in either first, second, or third place and the number of starters in the Maryland Million Turf Sprint Handicap, an American state-bred stakes race for horses three years old and older at 5 1/2 furlongs on the turf held at Laurel Park Racecourse in Laurel, Maryland. (List 2004-present)

Year	Winner	Second	Third	Starters
2020	No Race	No Race	No Race	0
2019	No Race	No Race	No Race	0
2018	No Race	No Race	No Race	0
2017	No Race	No Race	No Race	0
2016	No Race	No Race	No Race	0
2015	No Race	No Race	No Race	0
2014	No Race	No Race	No Race	0
2013	No Race	No Race	No Race	0
2012	Ben's Cat	Heros Reward	Colony Club	9
2011	Ben's Cat	Steady Warrior	Heaven's Voice	7
2010	Ben's Cat	If Not For Lust	Sandbaggin’ Lover	11
2009	Natural Seven	Citifest	Hero's Reward	n/a
2008	Kosmo’s Buddy	Natural Seven	Lycurgus	n/a
2007	Happy Sunrise	What a Monster	Mr. Mutter	n/a
2006	Deliver the Roses	Tommie's Star	Satan's Code	n/a
2005	Sarah's Prospect	Love Antics	Mr. Mutter	n/a
2004	Namequest	Shades of Sunny	Quest of Fate	n/a

== See also ==
- Maryland Million Turf Sprint Handicap
- Maryland Million Day
- Laurel Park Racecourse
