= Maryland Racing Media Stakes =

- Class: Listed Stakes
- Location: Laurel Park Racecourse, Laurel, Maryland, United States
- Inaugurated: 1992
- Race type: Thoroughbred – Flat racing

Race information
- Distance: 1 1/16 miles (9 furlongs)
- Surface: Dirt
- Track: left-handed
- Qualification: Three-year-old and up; fillies and mares
- Weight: Assigned
- Purse: $100,000

The Maryland Racing Media Stakes is an American Thoroughbred horse race run in February of each year at Laurel Park Racecourse in Baltimore, Maryland.

It is set at a distance of one and one sixteenth miles (eight and one half furlongs) on the dirt for fillies and mares and three years old and up. It is run for a purse of $100,000.

The race was named in honor of the Maryland Racing Media Association which was organized under the name of the Maryland Racing Writers' Association in 1937. It held its first meeting at Havre de Grave race track in that year. Originally the association was restricted to members of the print media; the membership now includes members from television, radio, publicity and photojournalism as well. The stakes record is held by Irving's Baby who won the race at 1 1/8 miles in 2002 in 1:50.20.

== Records ==
Most wins:

- 2 – Irving's Baby (2000, 2002)

Speed record:

- 1 1/8 miles – 1:50.20 – Irving's Baby

Most wins by a jockey:

- 3 – Mario Pino (1993, 1996, 2004)

Most wins by a trainer:

- 2 – Todd Pletcher (2001, 2002)
- 2 – Richard W. Small (2000, 2006)
- 2 – Donald H. Barr (1998, 1999)
- 2 – Ronald Cartwright (1995, 1997)

Most wins by an owner:

- 2 – Anstu Stables, Inc. (2001, 2002)

== Winners ==
Year	Winner	Age	Jockey	Trainer	Owner	Dist. (Miles)	Time	Purse$	Gr.
2019	Enchanted Ghost	4	Jevian Toledo	Hamilton A. Smith	Mens Grille Racing	1 1/16	1:44.84	$100,000	L/R
2018	Miss Inclusive	5	Jorge Vargas Jr.	John Servis	Main Line Racing Stable	1 1/16	1:44.89	$100,000	
2017	Winter	4	Trevor McCarthy	Cathal Lynch	Matthew Schera	1 1/16	1:44.95	$100,000	
2016	Pangburn	4	Jevion Toledo	Anthony Dutrow	Shortleaf Stable	1 1/16	1:47.40	$75,000	
2015	Lunar Surge	4	José Ortiz	George Weaver	Jim & Susan Hill	1 1/8	1:52.41	$100,000	
2014	Ilikecandy	4	Alex Cintron	H. Graham Motion	Robert LaPenta	1 1/8	1:53.91	$100,000	
2013	Moon Philly	-	Jeremy Rose	Michael J. Trombetta	Country Life Farm	1-1/8	1:54.57	$125,000	
2012	Lacie Slew	6	Joseph Rocco Jr.	Peter Walder	John Buckley Jr	1-1/8	1:50.98	$100,000	
2011	Potosina	4	Sheldon Russell	Mark Shuman	Pozo de Luna, Inc.	1-1/8	1:53.85	$70,000	
2010	Miss Singhsix	5	Luis Garcia	Marty Wolfson	Team Valor International	1-1/8	1:51.67	$70,000	
2009	Hello Poochi Pooh	4	Erick Rodriguez	John Alecci	John Alecci	1-1/8	1:51.78	$60,000	
2008	Cryptoquip *	5	Jeremy Rose	H. Graham Motion	Elisabeth H. Alexander	1-1/8	1:54.20	$60,000	
2007	Lexi Star	5	Ryan Fogelsonger	Christopher Grove	Stephen E. Quick	1-1/8	1:51.10	$100,000	
2006	Sticky	4	J. Z. Santana	Richard W. Small	Robert E. Meyerhoff	1-1/8	1:54.00	$80,000	
2005	Friel's for Real	5	Abe Castellano Jr.	Edward T. Allard	Gilbert G. Campbell	1-1/8	1:52.80	$50,000	
2004	Undercover	5	Mario Pino	Anthony W. Dutrow	Gasparilla Stable	1-1/8	1:52.80	$75,000	
2003	Pupil	4	Stewart Elliott	John Servis	Dr. William B. Wilmot	1-1/8	1:52.00	$75,000	
2002	Irving's Baby	5	Ramon Domínguez	Todd Pletcher	Anstu Stables, Inc.	1-1/8	1:50.20	$50,000	
2001	Irving's Baby	4	Ramon Domínguez	Todd Pletcher	Anstu Stables, Inc.	1-3/16	1:59.00	$75,000	
2000	Tookin Down **	5	Nick Goodwin	Richard W. Small	Richard W. Small	1-1/8	1:50.40	$75,000	
1999	Merengue	4	Rick Wilson	Donald H. Barr	Gerald C. Dickens	1-1/8	1:50.40	$75,000	
1998	G. O'Keefe	4	Mark T. Johnston	Donald H. Barr	Dr. Thomas Bowman	1-1/8	1:50.80	$50,000	
1997	Miss Slewpy	6	Larry Reynolds	Ronald Cartwright		1-1/8	1:50.60	$75,000	
1996	Cormorant's Flight	6	Mario Pino	David Holstein		1-1/8	1:51.60	$75,000	
1995	Miss Slewpy	4	Larry Reynolds	Ronald Cartwright		1-1/8	1:52.00	$75,000	
1994	Buffels	5	Mark T. Johnston	King T. Leatherbury	Dr. V. Stevens	1-1/8	1:52.00	$50,000	
1993	Ritchie Trail	5	Mario Pino	Charles H. Hadry		1-1/16	1:43.20	$75,000	
1992	Risen Colony	4	Mike Luzzi	Ross R. Pearce		1-1/16	1:45.20	$50,000	

A * indicates that All Smiles was disqualified from first and placed second in 2008. A ** indicates that Proud Owner was disqualified from first and placed fourth in 2000.

== See also ==
- Maryland Racing Media Stakes top three finishers and starters
- Black-Eyed Susan Stakes
- Laurel Park Racecourse
