= Mister Diz Stakes top three finishers =

Ben's Cat Stakes - Laurel Park Racecourse - Maryland - Year: (1983-2017)

This is a listing of the horses that finished in either first, second, or third place and the number of starters in the Ben's Cat Stakes (1983-2017), an American Thoroughbred Stakes race for fillies and mares three years-old and up at one mile (5 1/2 furlongs) run on turf at Laurel Park Racecourse in Laurel, Maryland.

Year	Winner	Second	Third	Starters
2018	Sonny Inspired	Grandiflora	English Minister	8
2017	Phlash Phelps	English Minister	Talk Show Man	12
2016	John Jones	Just Jack	Ben's Cat	13
2015	Ben's Cat	Night Officer	Sonny Inspired	7
2014	Ben's Cat	Sonny Inspired	Relentless Move	n/a
2013	Ben's Cat	Night Officer	Disco Elvis	n/a
2012	Ben's Cat	Steady Warrior	Delaunay	n/a
2011	Ben's Cat	Sandbagin' Lover	Digger	n/a
2010	Ben's Cat	Sandbagin' Lover	Centic Innis	n/a
2009	Heros Reward	Natural Seven	Sandbagin' Lover	n/a
2008	Lycurgus	Saay Mi Name	Norjac	n/a
2007	Tommie's Star	Hands On	Whata Monster	n/a
2006	Procreate	Hands On	Rainbow Inthestorm	n/a
2005	Yankee Wildcat	Procreate	Spring Kitten	n/a
2004	Yankee Wildcat	Nortouch	Quest of Fate	n/a
2003	Ghostly Numbers	Buenos Dias	Elberton	n/a
2002	Ghostly Numbers	Access Agenda	Elberton	n/a
2001	Elberton	Tyaskin	Maypole Dance	n/a
2000	My Problem	Greenspring Willy	Light Up the Town	n/a
1999	Smart Sonny	Private Slip	Tyaskin	n/a
1998	Tyaskin	Saycaseyribs	Goldminer's Dream	n/a
1997	One More Power	Gilded Youth	D. Guilford	n/a
1996	Goldminer's Dream	Wise Dusty	Scrub Brush	n/a
1995	Wise Dusty	Ace's Orphan	High Justice	n/a
1994	Higher Strata	Older But Smarter	Maryland Moon	n/a
1993	No Race	No Race	No Race	0
1992	North Carroll	Rainbow Prospect	Cruel Cavalier	n/a
1991	Risk It	Smart Alec	Tank	n/a
1990	Fighting Notion	Wooden Injun	Philosophical	n/a
1989	Northern Wolf	Gronwohld	Midas	n/a
1988	Lord Maniac	Lord March	Bullhorn	n/a
1987	Prince Judex	Sudden Flare	Silano	n/a
1986	Polar Escape	Ascool	Hatta Pro	n/a
1985	Prince Valid	Whoop Up	Ryburn	n/a
1984	Knight of Armor	Big Dreams	Hear Hear	n/a
1983	Prince Valid	Jova	Swelegant	n/a
