= Fire Plug Stakes =

- Class: Ungraded Stakes
- Location: Laurel Park Racecourse, Laurel, Maryland, United States
- Inaugurated: 1993
- Race type: Thoroughbred - Flat racing
- Website: www.laurelpark.com

Race information
- Distance: 6 furlongs
- Surface: Dirt
- Track: left-handed
- Qualification: Four-years-old & up, open
- Weight: Assigned
- Purse: $125,000

The Fire Plug Stakes is an American Thoroughbred horse race held in January at Laurel Park Racecourse in Laurel, Maryland. It is open to horses four-year-olds and up and is run at six furlongs on the dirt.

An ungraded stakes, it offers a purse of $125,000. The race was named in honor of Fire Plug, a quick and durable horse that ran throughout the east coast from age three to age seven. He was campaigned by his breeder and owner, Arthur Appleton, and trained by Bob Camac. The gelding won or placed in 50 of his 54 lifetime starts, most of those races being sprints. Half of his 29 victories came in graded stakes races, including the J. Edgar Hoover Stakes, the Maryland Breeders' Cup Handicap and the Roman Handicap. The son of King of the North, Fire Plug retired in 1991 at the age of 8 after placing in three stakes that season and winning the final start of his career.

== Records ==
Speed record:

- 6 furlongs - 1:09.13 - Digger (2010)

Most wins by an owner:

- 2 - Ah Day (2007 & 2008)

Most wins by a jockey:

- 2 - Jeremy Rose (2008 & 2009)
- 2 - Rick Wilson (1995 & 1998)

Most wins by a trainer:

- 2 - King T. Leatherbury (2007 & 2008)

== Winners of the Fire Plug Stakes ==
Year	Winner	Age	Jockey	Trainer	Owner	Dist. (Miles)	Time	Purse$
2018	Awesome Banner	4	J. D. Acosta	Ken Decker	Jacks Or Better Farm, Inc.	6 fur.	1:08.94	$100,000
2017	Imperial Hint	4	Trevor McCarthy	Luis Carvajal Jr.	Raymond Mamone	6 fur.	1:10.52	$100,000
2016	Sonny Inspired	6	Jevian Toledo	Phil Schoenthal	D Hatman Thoroughbreds	6 fur.	1:10.95	$100,000
2015	Never Stop Looking	6	Roimes Chirinos	Claudio Gonzalez	Somraj Singh	6 fur.	1:11.81	$100,000
2014	Broad Rule	6	Forest Boyce	Richard Small	Fitzhugh LLC	6 fur.	1:11.49	$100,000
2013	Broad Rule	5	Forest Boyce	Richard Small	Fitzhugh LLC	6 fur.	1:11.60	$125,000
2011	2012	Race not held						
2010	Digger	6	Mike Luzzi	Scott A. Lake	Repole Stable	6 fur.	1:09.13	$75,000
2009	Suave Jazz	6	Jeremy Rose	Anthony Dutrow	Michael Dubb	6 fur.	1:10.96	$50,000
2008	Ah Day	5	Jeremy Rose	King T. Leatherbury	Jim Stable	6 fur.	1:09.80	$80,000
2007	Ah Day	4	Mario Pino	King T. Leatherbury	Jim Stable	6 fur.	1:10.20	$80,000
2006	Abbondanza	5	Enrique Jurado	Timothy Tullock Jr.	Germania Farms, Inc.	6 fur.	1:11.40	$60,000
2005	Race not held							
2004	Sassy Hound	7	Abe Castellano Jr.	Ben Feliciano Jr.	Toby Roth	6 fur.	1:10.00	$50,000
2003	Love Happy	5	Ramon Dominguez	Howard Wolfendale	Not Found	6 fur.	1:09.80	$75,000
2002	Deer Run	5	Alcibiades Cortez	Christopher W. Grove	William Harris	6 fur.	1:10.80	$50,000
2001	Disco Rico	4	Harry Vega	Valora A. Testerman	C. Oliver Goldsmith	6 fur.	1:09.60	$75,000
2000	Memory Tap	4	Mark T. Johnston	Hamilton A. Smith	Not Found	6 fur.	1:10.60	$75,000
1999	Wire Me Collect	6	Robby Alvarado Jr.	Robert W. Camac	A Syndicate, Inc.	6 fur.	1:10.00	$40,000
1998	Jove Stone	4	Rick Wilson	Richard E. Dutrow	Rivard Stables	6 fur.	1:10.60	$40,000
1997	Mary's Buckaroo	6	Mario Verge	Mary Joanne Hughes	George Swope	6 fur.	1:09.80	$32,000
1996	Race not held							
1995	Tidal Surge	5	Rick Wilson	Timothy F. Ritchey	Paul D. Wilson	6 fur.	1:10.80	$32,000
1994	Secret Odds	4	Edgar Prado	Lawrence E. Murray	Howard & Sondra Bender	6 fur.	1:09.80	$35,000
1993	Fighting Notion	6	Alberto Delgado	Nancy B. Heil	Jeanne Beg	6 fur.	1:11.60	$35,000

== See also ==
- Fire Plug Stakes top three finishers
- Laurel Park Racecourse
