= Maryland Million Classic top three finishers =

This is a listing of the horses that finished in either first, second, or third place and the number of starters in the Maryland Million Classic, an American state-bred stakes race for three-year-olds and up at 1-1/8 miles on dirt held at Laurel Park Racecourse in Laurel, Maryland. (List 1986-present)

Year	Winner	Second	Third	Starters
2021	Prendemi	Tappin Cat	The Poser	8
2020	Monday Morning Qb	Harpers First Ride	Tattooed	-
2018	Forest Fire	Prendimi	Tappin Cat	13
2018	Saratoga Bob	Dothat Dance	Clubman	10
2017	Bonus Points	Southside Warrior	Ghost Bay	12
2016	Admirals War Chest	Bullheaded Boy	Just Jack	10
2015	Admirals War Chest	Bullheaded Boy	I'm Mr. Blue	9
2014	Eighttofasttocatch	Concealed Identity	Turbin	9
2013	Eighttofasttocatch	Romancing the Gold	Wild Louis	7
2012	Not Abroad	Regal Warrior	Tujoes	7
2011	Eighttofasttocatch	Cactus Charlie	Not Abroad	7
2010	Regal Solo	Not Abroad	Regal Warrior	6
2009	Sumacha’hot	Cuba	Regal Solo	n/a
2008	Cuba	Diamond David	Evil Storm	n/a
2007	Evil Storm	Five Steps	Diamond David	n/a
2006	Due	Diamond David	Evil Storm	n/a
2005	Play Bingo	Aggadan	Five Steps	n/a
2004	Presidentialaffair	Aggadan	Irish Colony	n/a
2003	Docent	Presidentialaffair	Jorgie Stover	n/a
2002	Docent	Hay Getoutofmyway	Concerned Minister	n/a
2001	Sumerset	Lightning Paces	P Day	n/a
2000	Testing	Watchman's Warning	P Day	n/a
1999	Perfect to a Tee	Steak Scam	Testafly	n/a
1998	Algar	Warrenpeace	Testing	n/a
1997	Algar	Mary's Buckaroo	Testing	n/a
1996	Frugal Doc	Oliver's Twist	Algar	n/a
1995	Brilliant Patriot	Mary's Buckaroo	Oliver's Twist	n/a
1994	Taking Risks	Frugal Doc	Super Memory	n/a
1993	Forry Cow How	Frugal Doc	Ameri Valay	n/a
1992	Reputed Testamony	Timely Warning	Frugal Doc	n/a
1991	Timely Warning	Midas	Baron de Vaux	n/a
1990	Timely Warning	Master Speaker	Cefis	n/a
1989	Master Speaker	Little Bold John	Due North	n/a
1988	Mister S. M.	Due North	Little Bold John	n/a
1987	Little Bold John	Bagatelle	Castelets	n/a
1986	Herat	Castelets	Due North	n/a

== See also ==
- Maryland Million Classic
- Maryland Million Day
- Laurel Park Racecourse
