= Ben's Cat Stakes =

- Class: Restricted State-bred Stakes
- Location: Laurel Park Racecourse, Laurel, Maryland, United States
- Inaugurated: 1983
- Race type: Thoroughbred - Flat racing
- Website: www.laurelpark.com

Race information
- Distance: 6 furlongs
- Surface: Turf
- Track: Left-handed
- Qualification: Three-year-olds & Up
- Weight: Assigned
- Purse: $60,000

The Ben's Cat Stakes is an American Thoroughbred horse race held annually in August at Laurel Park Racecourse in Laurel, Maryland. It is open to horses three years old and up and is raced on turf. For 2016, the distance is 6 furlongs. This race was formerly called the Mister Diz Stakes.

The race honors Ben's Cat, Maryland's four-time Horse of the Year that won 32 races, 26 stakes and more than $2.6 million in purse earnings from 63 starts in an eight-year career from 2010 to 2017. Ben's Cat was bred, owned and trained by Hall of Fame inductee King Leatherbury. Ben's Cat died at the age of 11 in July 2017, less than a month following his retirement. Ben's Cat actually won the race that would be renamed in his honor an unheard of six times.

The race was formerly named in honor of Mister Diz, who was bred and owned by former Pimlico Race Course Vice-president Nathan Cohen. Mister Diz was named Maryland-bred champion for four consecutive years from 1968 to 1971. He was the Champion two-year-old, three-year-old and champion older horse twice. He was also named Champion turf horse twice. Mister Diz, a foal of 1966, came from modest origins. He was a gelding out of Panacean and earned $387,015 over eight seasons. Mister Diz was named for track employee Frank Rosenfeld, who was nicknamed Mister Diz. The flashy chestnut gelding with four high white stockings and a blaze won nine stakes races and placed in 16 others. He set track records at Laurel Park for 7 furlongs and Monmouth Park at 1 1/8 miles.

== Records ==
Speed record:

- 5.5 furlongs - 1:01.00 - Tommie's Star (2007)
- 6 furlongs - 1:08.60 - My Problem (2000)
- 5 furlongs - 0:56.00 - Elberton (2001)

Most wins by a horse

- 6 - Ben's Cat (2010, 2011, 2012, 2013, 2014, 2015)

Most wins by a jockey:

- 3 - Julian Pimentel (2013, 2014, 2015)

Most wins by a trainer:

- 6 - King T. Leatherbury (2010, 2011, 2012, 2013, 2014, 2015)
- 3 - Michael Trombetta (2002, 2003, 2006)

== Winners ==
Year	Winner	Age	Jockey	Trainer	Owner	Distance	Time	Purse
2019	Oldies But Goodies	4	Alex Cintron	Michael J. Trombetta	R. Larry Johnson	5.5 fur.	1:01.84	$75,000
2018	Sonny Inspired	7	Daniel Centeno	Phil Schoenthal	D Hatman Thoroughbreds	6 fur.	1:08.95	$75,000
2017	Phlash Phelps	6	Victor Carrasco	Rodney Jenkins	Hillwood Stable LLC (Ellen Charles)	6 fur.	1:08.40	$100,000
2016	John Jones	4	Luis Garcia	Lacey Gaudet	Matthew Schera	6 fur.	1:10.58	$100,000
2015	Ben's Cat	9	Julian Pimentel	King T. Leatherbury	The Jim Stable	5.5 fur.	1:02.97	$100,000
2014	Ben's Cat	8	Julian Pimentel	King T. Leatherbury	The Jim Stable	5.5 fur.	1:01.75	$125,000
2013	Ben's Cat	7	Julian Pimentel	King T. Leatherbury	The Jim Stable	5 fur.	0:57.74	$125,000
2012	Ben's Cat	6	Horacio Karamanos	King T. Leatherbury	The Jim Stable	5 fur.	0:57.26	$75,000
2011	Ben's Cat	5	Jeremy Rose	King T. Leatherbury	The Jim Stable	5 fur.	0:57.82	$75,000
2010	Ben's Cat	4	Rosemary Homeister	King T. Leatherbury	The Jim Stable	6 fur.	1:09.08	$70,000
2009	Heros Reward	7	Anna Napravnik	Dale Capuano	Rob Ry Farm (Bob Haynes)	5.5 fur.	1:02.62	$50,000
2008	Lycurgus	4	Josue Arce	Scott A. Lake	Toby Roth	5.5 fur.	1:03.98	$50,000
2007	Tommie's Star	4	Travis Dunkelberger	Ben M. Feliciano Jr.	Elaine C. Bassford	5.5 fur.	1:01.00	$50,000
2006	Procreate	8	Rosie Napravnik	Michael J. Trombetta	Thomas McClay	5 fur.	0:57.20	$75,000
2005	Yankee Wildcat	7	Enrique M. Jurado	Timothy Tullock Jr.	Virginia Wright	5 fur.	0:56.80	$50,000
2004	Yankee Wildcat	6	Enrique M. Jurado	Timothy Tullock Jr.	Virginia Wright	5 fur.	0:58.60	$75,000
2003	Ghostly Numbers	5	Rick Wilson	Michael J. Trombetta	Ghost Breeding	5.5 fur.	1:05.40	$50,000
2002	Ghostly Numbers	4	Mario Pino	Michael J. Trombetta	Ghost Breeding	5.5 fur.	1:03.00	$50,000
2001	Elberton	4	Alberto Delgado	Luigi Gino	C. Frank Hopkins	5 fur.	0:56.00	$75,000
2000	My Problem	4	Travis Dunkelberger	Dale Capuano	Russell E. Train	6 fur.	1:08.60	$60,000
1999	Smart Sunny	6	Shane Sellers	Howard E. Wolfendale	David H. Wade	5 fur.	0:58.60	$75,000
1998	Tyaskin	5	Omar Clinger	Donald H. Barr	Marshall E. Dowell	6 fur.	1:10.40	$60,000
1997	One More Power	4	Frank G. Douglas	Lawrence E. Murray	Sondra D. Bender	6 fur.	1:09.40	$60,000
1996	Goldminer's Dream	7	Edgar Prado	Ann W. Merryman	Dark Hollow Racing Partnership	6 fur.	1:10.00	$60,000
1995	Wise Dusty	4	Allen T. Stacy	Wayne M. Bailey	Adrian L. Merton	6 fur.	1:10.20	$60,000
1994	Higher Strata	4	Andrea Seefeldt	Richard W. Small	Donald E. Souder	6 fur.	1:10.60	$50,000
1993	No Race	-	No Race	No Race	No Race	no race	0:00.00	no race
1992	North Carroll	3	Mike Luzzi	Benjamin W. Perkins Jr.	Richard D. Morris	6 fur.	1:11.00	$50,000
1991	Risk It	3	Joe Tocco	Ronald A. Alfano	Kenneth L. Brown	6 fur.	1:13.20	$60,000
1990	Fighting Notion	3	Alberto Delgado	Nancy B. Heil	Arlene E. Kushner	6 fur.	1:11.00	$60,000
1989	Northern Wolf	3	Clarence J. Ladner III	Hank Allen	Deep Silver Stable (John Meeks, Howard Hoffman, Alan Cahill)	6 fur.	1:11.40	$60,000
1988	Lord Maniac	3	Vincent Bracciale Jr.	Mario Beneito	Nadine A Becker	6 fur.	1:13.00	$55,000
1987	Prince Judex	3	Julie Krone	n/a	D. Raymond Wright	6 fur.	1:11.20	$50,000
1986	Polar Escapade	3	Mario Pino	John H. Forbes	Tom Giardalas	6 fur.	1:12.00	$45,000
1985	Prince Valid	6	Paul A. Nichol Jr.	Dean Gaudet	Israel Cohen	5 fur.	0:57.40	$30,000
1984	Knight of Armor	4	Paul A. Nichol Jr.	n/a	J. F. Edwards	5 fur.	0:58.20	$30,000
1983	Prince Valid	4	David Brynes	Dean Gaudet	Israel Cohen	5 fur.	0:57.80	$30,000

== See also ==
- Ben's Cat Stakes top three finishers
