= Squan Song Stakes =

- Class: Discontinued Stakes
- Location: Laurel Park Racecourse, Laurel, Maryland, United States
- Inaugurated: 1988
- Final run: 2011
- Race type: Thoroughbred – Flat racing
- Website: www.laurelpark.com

Race information
- Distance: 7 furlongs
- Surface: Dirt
- Track: left-handed
- Qualification: Fillies & Mares; Three years-old & up
- Weight: Assigned
- Purse: $75,000

The Squan Song Stakes was a race for Thoroughbred horses held in early November at Laurel Park in Maryland. The ungraded stakes race was open to three-year-olds, ran at one mile on the dirt, and offered a purse of $75,000.

This race was named for Squan Song (born 1981), who was a four-time Maryland Bred champion, from 1984 to 1987 and earned "Horse-of-the-Year" honors in 1985. A winner of 18 of her 36 career starts, with 12 placements (ten in stakes races), the mare earned $898,444, placing her fourth on the all-time list of top Maryland-bred money winners at the time of her retirement. She was sold by her breeder Linda Green, for $125,000 as a weanling at Keeneland.

Squan Song campaigned under the colors of owners Bob Brennan's Due ProcessStable, winning a total of 14 stakes races, including the Grade 2 Cotillion Handicap at Philadelphia Park, the Rare Treat Stakes and the Affectionately Handicap at Aqueduct Racetrack. She set track records for a mile and one sixteenth in the Meadowlands Racetrack's Honey Bee Handicap and in Garden State Park Racetrack's Haddonfield Handicap.

== Records ==
Speed record:

- 7 furlong - 1:23.00 - Gazillion (2002)
- 1 1/8 miles - 1:50.00 - Wait for the Lady (1990)

Most wins by a jockey:

- 4 - Alberto Delgado (1988, 1991, 1992, 2009)
- 3 - Jeremy Rose (2002, 2003, 2006)

Most wins by a trainer:

- 3 - Richard W. Small (2004, 2005, 2007)

== Winners of the Squan Song Stakes since 1988 ==
Year	Winner	Age	Jockey	Trainer	Owner	Distance	Time	Purse
2011	Art of the Hunt	3	Luis Garcia	Frannie Campitelli	Rosalee C. Davison	7-fur.	1:25.33	$75,000
2010	Music Please	3	Eric Camacho	Rodney Jenkins	Mrs. J.W.Y. Martin	7-fur.	1:26.97	$50,000
2009	Sterling Vow	4	Alberto Delgado	Ronald Sweeney	Marilyn Ketts	7-fur.	1:25.54	$50,000
2008	Now It Begins	4	Charles Forrest	Michael Trombetta	R. Larry Johnson	7-fur.	1:25.12	$50,000
2007	For Kisses	4	Rosie Napravnik	Richard W. Small	Buckingham Farm	7-fur.	1:26.60	$45,000
2006	Yolanda B. Too	4	Jeremy Rose	Richard A. Violette	Dixiana Farm	7-fur.	1:25.20	$50,000
2005	Magical Broad	3	H. A. Karamanos	Richard W. Small	Fitzhugh, LLC	7-fur.	1:26.40	$50,000
2004	Perilous Night	3	Jozbin Santana	Richard W. Small	Fitzhugh, LLC	6-fur.	1:13.00	$50,000
2003	Search for a Cure	3	Jeremy Rose	Dale Capuano	Louis Ulman	7-fur.	1:25.00	$50,000
2002	Gazillion	3	Jeremy Rose	Hamilton A. Smith	Lucy C. Kessler	7-fur.	1:23.00	$50,000
2001	Winter Leaf	3	Larry Reynolds	Ronald Cartrwright	Michael T. Sutherland	7-fur.	1:24.80	$50,000
2000	Miss Cheers	4	Mark T. Johnston	William M. Howard	Candy Stable	7-fur.	1:25.60	$50,000
1999	Northern Mist	4	Mario Verge	Ronald A. Alfano	David P. Reynolds	7-fur.	1:24.40	$50,000
1988	2005	-	No Races	No Races	No Races	no races	0:00.00	no races
1993	Gammy's Alden	4	Mike Luzzi		Vincent Bracciale, Jr.	1 1/8	1:50.80	$55,000
1992	Wait for the Lady	5	Alberto Delgado		Hickory House Farm	1 1/8	1:51.00	$60,000
1991	Wait for the Lady	4	Alberto Delgado		Hickory House Farm	1 1/8	1:50.00	$60,000
1990	Diane's Girl	4	Edgar Prado		J.K. Thomas, H. Boone	1 1/8	1:52.40	$75,000
1989	Lady Annabelle	5	Vincent Bracciale Jr.		Cecil Seaman, Charles Cole	1 1/16	1:44.00	$55,000
1988	Smart 'n Quick	5	Alberto Delgado			1 1/8	1:52.40	$60,000

== See also ==
- Squan Song Stakes "top three finishers" and starters
- Laurel Park Racecourse
