= Maryland Million Turf Sprint Handicap =

- Class: Restricted State-bred Stakes
- Location: Laurel Park Racecourse, Laurel, Maryland, United States
- Inaugurated: 2004
- Race type: Thoroughbred - Flat racing
- Website: Marylandthoroughbred.com

Race information
- Distance: 5.5 furlongs
- Surface: Turf
- Track: Left-handed
- Qualification: Three-year-olds and up
- Purse: $100,000

Maryland Million Turf Sprint Handicap is an American Thoroughbred horse race held annually in October since 2004 primarily at Laurel Park Racecourse in Laurel, Maryland or at Pimlico Race Course in Baltimore. To be eligible for the Maryland Million Turf Sprint Handicap, a horse must be sired by a stallion who stands in Maryland. Due to that restriction the race is classified as a non-graded or "listed" stakes race and is not eligible for grading by the American Graded Stakes Committee.

The race is part of Maryland Million Day, a twelve-race program held in mid October that was the creation of renowned television sports journalist Jim McKay. The "Maryland Million" is the first State-Bred showcase event ever created. Since 1986, 27 other events in twenty states have imitated the showcase and its structure.

In its sixth running in 2009, the race was restricted to those horses who were sired by a stallion who stands in the State of Maryland. Both the entrant horse and their stallion must be nominated to the Maryland Million program.

== Records ==
Most wins:

- 3 - Ben's Cat (2010, 2011, 2012)

Speed record:

- 0:55.80 - Deliver the Roses (2006)

Most wins by an owner:

- 3 - The Jim Stable (2010, 2011, 2012)

Most wins by a jockey:

- 2 - Ramon Dominguez - (2005 & 2009)
- 2 - Julien Pimental (2010 & 2012)

Most wins by a trainer:

- 3 - King T. Leatherbury - (2010, 2011, 2012)
- 2 - Ben M. Feliciano Jr. - (2004 & 2009)

== Winners of the Maryland Million Turf Sprint Handicap since 2004 ==
Yr	Winner	Age	Jockey	Trainer	Owner	Dist.	Time	Purse
2020	No Race	-	No Race	No Race	No Race	no race	0:00.00	no race
2019	No Race	-	No Race	No Race	No Race	no race	0:00.00	no race
2018	No Race	-	No Race	No Race	No Race	no race	0:00.00	no race
2017	No Race	-	No Race	No Race	No Race	no race	0:00.00	no race
2016	No Race	-	No Race	No Race	No Race	no race	0:00.00	no race
2015	No Race	-	No Race	No Race	No Race	no race	0:00.00	no race
2014	No Race	-	No Race	No Race	No Race	no race	0:00.00	no race
2013	No Race	-	No Race	No Race	No Race	no race	0:00.00	no race
2012	Ben's Cat	6	Julien Pimentel	King T. Leatherbury	The Jim Stable	5.5 fur.	1:01.64	$100,000
2011	Ben's Cat	5	Jeremy Rose	King T. Leatherbury	The Jim Stable	5.5 fur.	1:06.07	$100,000
2010	Ben's Cat	4	Julian Pimentel	King T. Leatherbury	The Jim Stable	5.5 fur.	1:05.54	$100,000
2009	Natural Seven	5	Ramon Dominguez	Ben M. Feliciano Jr.	Taking Risks Stable	5.5 fur.	1:01.59	$100,000
2008	Kosmo’s Buddy	6	Eric Camacho	Timothy E. Salzman	Arnold K. Smolen	5.5 fur.	1:02.84	$100,000
2007	Happy Sunrise	4	Horatio A. Karamanos	Howard E. Wolfendale	Robert L. Cole, Jr.	5.5 fur.	1:01.62	$150,000
2006	Deliver the Roses	6	E. D. Rodriguez	Robert Leaf, Jr.	Paul G. Hartman	5.5 fur.	0:55.91	$100,000
2005	Sarah's Prospect	3	Ramon A. Dominguez	Martin Zaretsky	Michael J. Gill	5.5 fur.	0:56.63	$100,000
2004	Namequest	8	T. G. Turner	Ben M. Feliciano, Jr.	Taking Risks Stable	5.5 fur.	0:57.22	$100,000

== See also ==
- Maryland Million Turf Sprint Handicap top three finishers
- Maryland Million Day
- Laurel Park Racecourse
