= Turf Monster Stakes =

- Class: Grade III
- Location: Parx Casino and Racing; Bensalem, Pennsylvania, United States
- Inaugurated: 2002 (as Turf Monster Handicap)
- Race type: Thoroughbred - Flat racing
- Website: Parx

Race information
- Distance: 5 furlongs
- Surface: Turf
- Track: left-handed
- Qualification: Three years old and older
- Weight: Base weights with allowances: Older: 126 lbs 3YOs: 122 lbs
- Purse: $300,000 (2019)

The Turf Monster Stakes is a Grade III American Thoroughbred horse race for three years old or older, over a distance of five furlongs on the turf held annually in September at Parx Casino and Racing racetrack in Bensalem, Pennsylvania. As of 2019, the event currently carried a purse of $300,000.

== History ==
The race was inaugurated on May 27, 2002 with an attractive purse offered of $100,000 as the Turf Monster Handicap.

In 2011 the event was upgraded to a Grade III.

The event has attracted fast sprinters from the East Coast of the US, including Pure Sensation, who won this event four times and Ben's Cat who won this event twice.

The race was not held in 2020 due to the COVID-19 pandemic. In 2021 the ten-year-old Hollywood Talent finished with a late surge and won by 1 1/4 lengths at odds of 108-1, but the horse was later disqualified after drug testing found the prohibited substance levamisole.

The 2024 running was moved off the turf to the dirt track due to the poor state of the turf track.

== Records ==
Speed record:

- 5 furlongs – 55.53 - Smart Enough (2007)

Margins:

- 5 1/4 lengths – Worldwind Romance (2005)

Most wins by a jockey

- 4 – Kendrick Carmouche (2008, 2015, 2017, 2018)

Most wins by a trainer

- 4 – Christophe Clement (2015, 2017, 2018, 2019)

Most wins by an owner

- 4 – Patricia A. Generazio (2015, 2017, 2018, 2019)

Winners of Parx Dash Stakes – Turf Monster Stakes double

- Ben's Cat (2012), Pure Sensation (2017, 2019)

== Winners ==
Year	Winner	Age	Jockey	Trainer	Owner	Distance	Time	Purse	Grade	Ref
Turf Monster Stakes
2025	Race not held									
2024	Smooth B	5	Mychel Sanchez	Robert Reid Jr.	LC Racing	5 furlongs	58.31	$250,000	Listed	Off turf
2023	Nobody Listens	5	Tyler Gaffalione	Tim Eggleston	Matt Kwiatkowski, Jason Kaylor & Roger D. Browning	5 furlongs	1:01.40	$250,000	III	
2022	That's Right	3	Andy Hernandez	Michael M. Moore	James A. Shannon Jr.	5 furlongs	57.66	$300,000	III	
2021	† Beer Can Man	3	Flavien Prat	Mark Glatt	Little Red Feather Racing & Sterling Stables	5 furlongs	59.51	$300,000	III	
2020	Race not held									
2019	Pure Sensation	8	Paco Lopez	Christophe Clement	Patricia A. Generazio	5 furlongs	57.80	$300,000	III	
2018	Pure Sensation	7	Kendrick Carmouche	Christophe Clement	Patricia A. Generazio	5 furlongs	56.42	$300,000	III	
2017	Pure Sensation	6	Kendrick Carmouche	Christophe Clement	Patricia A. Generazio	5 furlongs	57.13	$300,000	III	
2016	Doctor J Dub	6	Sheldon Russell	Jena Antonucci	Drawing Away Stable	5 furlongs	58.73	$300,000	III	
Turf Monster Handicap
2015	Pure Sensation	4	Kendrick Carmouche	Christophe Clement	Patricia A. Generazio	5 furlongs	55.81	$300,000	III	
2014	Sharp Sensation	4	David Moran	Reade Baker	Jim & Susan Hill	5 furlongs	57.39	$300,000	III	
2013	Stormofthecentury	5	Stewart Elliott	Louis V. Ruberto Jr.	Beechwood Racing Stable	5 furlongs	57.44	$350,000	III	
2012	Ben's Cat	6	Julian Pimentel	King T. Leatherbury	The Jim Stable	5 furlongs	1:00.62	$350,000	III	
2011	Ben's Cat	7	Jeremy Rose	King T. Leatherbury	The Jim Stable	5 furlongs	57.30	$356,000	III	
2010	Chamberlain Bridge	6	Jamie Theriot	W. Bret Calhoun	Carl R. Moore Management	5 furlongs	56.63	$251,000	Listed	
2009	Chamberlain Bridge	5	John R. Velazquez	W. Bret Calhoun	Carl R. Moore Management	5 furlongs	57.14	$250,000	Listed	
2008	True to Tradition	6	Kendrick Carmouche	Scott A. Lake	Ben Mondello & Adam Russo	5 furlongs	56.17	$250,000	Listed	
2007	Smart Enough	4	Joe Bravo	John R. S. Fisher	Edith R. Dixon	5 furlongs	55.53	$200,000	Listed	
2006	Max West	6	Jose Luis Flores	Juan Carlos Guerrero	Juan Carlos Guerrero	5 furlongs	56.63	$100,000	Listed	
2005	Worldwind Romance	7	Ryan Barber	Mark Shuman	Michael J. Gill	5 furlongs	57.07	$100,000	Listed	
2004	Abderian (IRE)	7	Victor H. Molina	Benjamin M. Feliciano Jr.	Richard A. Englander	5 furlongs	57.53	$100,000	Listed	
2003	Testify	6	Greta Kuntzweiler	Randy L. Morse	Robert S. Mitchell Trust	5 furlongs	1:00.15	$100,000	Listed	
2002	Joe's Son Joey	4	Nick Santagata	Timothy A. Hills	Joseph R. Lunetta	5 furlongs	57.73	$100,000	Listed	

Legend:
Dirt Turf
Notes:
† In 2021, Hollywood Talent finished first but was later disqualified due to a medication violation.

== See also ==
- List of American and Canadian Graded races
