= Dahlia Stakes (United States) =

- Class: Ungraded stakes
- Location: Laurel Park Racecourse, Laurel, Maryland, United States
- Inaugurated: 1985
- Race type: Thoroughbred - Flat racing
- Website: www.laurelpark.com

Race information
- Distance: 1 mile (8 furlongs)
- Surface: Turf
- Track: Left-handed
- Qualification: Three-year-olds & Up; fillies and Mares
- Weight: Assigned
- Purse: $70,000

The Dahlia Stakes is an American Thoroughbred horse race held annually in April at Laurel Park Racecourse in Laurel, Maryland. It is open to fillies and mares three-year-olds and up and is raced on turf. It is contested over a distance of 1 mile (8 furlongs).

The race was named in honor of international race queen Dahlia. She was one of the preeminent turf runners in the world during the mid-1970s and retired in 1976 after her six-year-old season as the world's leading money winning distaffer (female). In 48 starts made in France, Ireland, England, Canada, Italy and the U.S., Dahlia won 15 times, was second three times and third seven more times. That elevated her career earnings up to $1,543,139. She was voted England's racehorse of the year twice and was named champion grass horse in the U.S. (a category that included the males at that time) in 1974.

During her three-year-old campaign, Dahlia was shipped from her base in France to race in the world's most prestigious turf race at that time, the Washington, D.C. International Stakes a grade one at Laurel Park Racecourse. In that race, she galloped away to a three and a quarter length victory over Big Spruce.

== Records ==
Speed record:

- 1 mile - 1:34.00 - Sweet Talker (2006)

Most wins by a jockey:

- 2 - Jeremy Rose (2008 & 2009)

Most wins by a trainer:

- 2 - H. Graham Motion (2006 & 2008)
- 2 - Barclay Tagg (1985 & 1987)

== Winners ==
Year	Winner	Age	Jockey	Trainer	Owner	Distance (Miles)	Time	Purse	Grade
2018		-				1 mile	0:00.00	$100,000	
2017	Danilovna	4	Trevor McCarthy	H. Graham Motion	Bjorn Nielson	1 mile	1:36.80	$75,000	
2016	Seeking Treasure	6	Alex Cintron	Doug Matthews	Steven E. Frum	1 mile	1:33.99	$75,000	
2015	Nellie Cashman	4	Forest Boyce	Francis Abbott	Sycamore Racing	1 mile	1:35.95	$100,000	
2014	Embarr	5	Forest Boyce	Susan Cooney	Susan Cooney	1-1/16	1:45.45	$100,000	
2013	Embarr	4	Forest Boyce	Susan Cooney	Susan Cooney	1-1/16	1:37.35	$100,000	
2012	Idle Talk	6	Horacio Karamanos	Mary Epler	Patrick Kelley	1-1/16	1:37.25	$75,000	
2011	Baltimore Belle	4	Julian Pimentel	Michael J. Trombetta	R. Larry Johnson	1-1/16	1:46.69	$75,000	
2010	My Main Starr	5	Horacio Karamanos	Gary Capuano	Gary Capuano & Paul L. Fowler Jr.	1 mile	1:42.12	$70,000	
2009	All Smiles	6	Jeremy Rose	Frannie Campitelli	Cynthia McGinnes	1 mile	1:39.12	$50,000	
2008	Lady Digby	4	Jeremy Rose	H. Graham Motion	Earle I. Mack	1 mile	1:38.92	$80,000	
2007	High Moment	4	Erick D. Rodriguez	Rodney Jenkins	Mr. & Mrs. D. R. Brown	1 mile	1:36.00	$60,000	
2006	Sweet Talker	4	Ramon Dominguez	H. Graham Motion	Courtlandt Farm	1 mile	1:34.00	$60,000	
1988	2005	-	No Races	No Races	No Races	no races	0:00.00	no races	
1987	Kerygma	3	Allen Stacy	Barclay Tagg	D. Earl Pardue	1 mile	1:37.60	$30,000	
1986	I Mean It	4	George Martens	Flint S. Schulhofer	Ichikawa Bokujo	1 mile	1:35.80	$30,000	
1985	Nothing Sweeter	4	Chris McCarron	Barclay Tagg	Walter D. Pinkard	1 mile	1:36.40	$30,000	

== See also ==
- Dahlia Stakes top three finishers
- Laurel Park Racecourse
