= Squan Song Stakes top three finishers =

This is a listing of the horses that finished in either first, second, or third place and the number of starters in the Squan Song Stakes, an American stakes race for three-year-olds at 7 furlongs/8 miles on dirt. It is held at Laurel Park Racecourse in Laurel, Maryland. (List 1988–present)

Year	Winner	Second	Third	Starters
2011				0
2010	Music Please	Heaven's Voice	My Misty's Echo	6
2009	Sterling Vow	Fascinatin’ Rhythm	Heaven's Voice	8
2008	Now It Begins	Vicar's Vixen	Fascinatin Rhythm	n/a
2007	For Kisses	Now It Begins	Take a Check	n/a
2006	Yolanda B. Too	La Chica Rica	Mint Landing	n/a
2005	Magical Broad	Starleena	Experts Only	n/a
2004	Perilous Night	Sea of Promises	Free Dip	n/a
2003	Search for a Cure	Darnestown	Bamba	n/a
2002	Gazillion	Darnestown	Tamayo	n/a
2001	Winter Leaf	Timely Irony	Anything for You	n/a
2000	Miss Cheers	Vanna Go	Thomasina	n/a
1999	Northern Mint	Rhonda Elaine	Unbridled Lady	n/a
1998	No Race	No Race	No Race	n/a
1997	No Race	No Race	No Race	n/a
1996	No Race	No Race	No Race	n/a
1995	No Race	No Race	No Race	n/a
1994	No Race	No Race	No Race	n/a
1993	Gammy's Alden	Groovy Feeling	Dress Optional	n/a
1992	Wait for the Lady	Etiquette	Little Bold Lookin	n/a
1991	Wait for the Lady	Crowned	First Down	n/a
1990	Diane's Girl	Double Bunctious	Salisbury Sal	n/a
1989	Lady Annabelle	Bourbon and Soda	Empress Tigere	n/a
1988	Smart 'n Quick	Landaura	Natania	n/a
