= Parx Dash Stakes =

- Class: Listed
- Location: Parx Casino and Racing; Bensalem, Pennsylvania, United States
- Inaugurated: 2011 (as Parx Dash Handicap)
- Race type: Thoroughbred - Flat racing
- Website: Parx

Race information
- Distance: 5 furlongs
- Surface: Turf
- Track: left-handed
- Qualification: Three years old and older
- Weight: Base weights with allowances: 4-year-olds and up: 126 lbs. 3-year-olds: 122 lbs.
- Purse: $100,000 (2022)
- Bonuses: Winner received automatic entry to Grade III Turf Monster Stakes

The Parx Dash Stakes is a Listed American Thoroughbred horse race for three years old or older, over a distance of five furlongs on the turf held annually in July at Parx Casino and Racing racetrack in Bensalem, Pennsylvania. The event currently carries a purse of $100,000.

== History ==
The race was inaugurated in 2011 with an attractive purse offered of $200,000 as the Parx Dash Handicap.

In 2013 the event was upgraded to a Grade III.

The event has attracted fast sprinters from the East Coast of the US, including Ben's Cat and Pure Sensation who both won this event three times.

In 2022 the event was downgraded to Listed. However the event was moved off the turf and status was lowered to a Black Type event.

== Records ==
Speed record:

- 5 furlongs – 54.96 - Ben's Cat (2012)

Margins:

- 5 3/4 lengths – Pure Sensation (2017)

Most wins by a jockey

- 3 – Julian Pimentel (2012, 2013, 2014)

Most wins by a trainer

- 3 – Christophe Clement (2016, 2017, 2019)
- 3 – King T. Leatherbury (2012, 2013, 2014)

Most wins by an owner

- 3 – The Jim Stable (2012, 2013, 2014)
- 3 – Patricia A. Generazio (2016, 2017, 2019)

Winners of Parx Dash Stakes – Turf Monster Stakes double

- Ben's Cat (2012)
- Pure Sensation (2017, 2019)

== Winners ==
Year	Winner	Age	Jockey	Trainer	Owner	Distance	Time	Purse	Grade	Ref
Parx Dash Stakes
2025	Race not held									
2024	Alogon	5	Jaime Rodriguez	Edward Allard	Charles T. Matses	5 furlongs	0:57.03	$100,000	Listed	
2023	Nobody Listens	5	Luis Saez	Tim Eggleston	Matt Kwiatkowski, Jason Keylor & Roger D. Browing	5 furlongs	0:58.83	$100,000	Listed	
2022	Violent Turbulence	5	Silvestre Gonzalez	Kathleen A. Demasi	Pewter Stable and Spedale Family Racing	5 furlongs	0:57.95	$200,000		Off turf
2021	The Critical Way	7	Paco Lopez	Jose Delgado	Monster Racing Stables	5 furlongs	0:58.55	$200,000	III	
2020	Race not held									
2019	Pure Sensation	8	Paco Lopez	Christophe Clement	Patricia A. Generazio	abt. 5 furlongs	1:00.42	$210,000	III	
2018	Vision Perfect	6	Frankie Pennington	Jason Servis	Mr. Amore Stable	5 furlongs	0:57.18	$200,000	III	
2017	Pure Sensation	6	Kendrick Carmouche	Christophe Clement	Patricia A. Generazio	5 furlongs	0:57.24	$200,000	III	
2016	Pure Sensation	5	Kendrick Carmouche	Christophe Clement	Patricia A. Generazio	5 furlongs	0:57.35	$200,000	III	
Parx Dash Handicap
2015	Tightend Touchdown	6	Frankie Pennington	Jason Servis	Mr. Amore Stable	5 furlongs	0:57.19	$200,000	III	
2014	Ben's Cat	8	Julian Pimentel	King T. Leatherbury	The Jim Stable	5 furlongs	0:56.62	$200,000	III	
2013	Ben's Cat	7	Julian Pimentel	King T. Leatherbury	The Jim Stable	5 furlongs	0:59.43	$200,000	III	
2012	Ben's Cat	6	Julian Pimentel	King T. Leatherbury	The Jim Stable	5 furlongs	0:54.96	$150,000	Listed	
2011	El Churruca	6	Angel S. Arroyo	Ramon Preciado	Victory Thoroughbred	5 furlongs	0:57.30	$200,000	Listed	

Legend:
Dirt Turf
