= Dahlia Stakes top three finishers =

This is a listing of the horses that finished in either first, second, or third place and the number of starters in the Dahlia Stakes (1985-2009), an American Thoroughbred Stakes race for fillies and mares three years-old and up at one mile (8 furlongs) run on turf at Laurel Park Racecourse in Laurel, Maryland.

| Year | Winner | Second | Third | Starters |
|---|---|---|---|---|
| 2018 | | | | - |
| 2017 | Danilovna | Northern Smile | Cambodia | 12 |
| 2016 | Seeking Treasure | Ginger N Rye | Nisharora | 13 |
| 2015 | Nellie Cashman | Run of the River | Fasnacloich | 13 |
| 2014 | Embarr | C C Gold | Zucchini Flower | 12 |
| 2013 | Embarr | Ask Me Anything | Charged Cotton | 12 |
| 2012 | Idle Talk | In the Rough | Master Shade | 12 |
| 2011 | Baltimore Belle | Weeper | Volare Cantare | 11 |
| 2010 | My Main Starr | Fareena | Sales Tax | 7 |
| 2009 | All Smiles | First Ascent | British Event | 13 |
| 2008 | No Race | No Race | No Race | 0 |
| 2007 | High Moment | Grigorieva | Redaspen | n/a |
| 2006 | Sweet Talker | Smart N Classy | Humoristic | n/a |
| 1988 | 2005 No Races | No Races | No Races | 0 |
| 1987 | Kerygma | Now Your Teapottin | Parade of Roses | n/a |
| 1986 | I Mean It | Pot of Antics | Subjective | n/a |
| 1985 | Nothing Sweeter | Appalachian Spring | Final Chapter | n/a |
