= Harrison E. Johnson Memorial Handicap top three finishers =

This is a listing of the horses that finished in either first, second, or third place and the number of starters in the Harrison E. Johnson Memorial Handicap (1986-present), an American Thoroughbred Stakes race for horses three years-old and up at 1 1/8 miles (9.0 furlongs; 1.8 km) on the dirt at Laurel Park Racecourse in Laurel, Maryland.

| Year | Winner | Second | Third | Starters |
|---|---|---|---|---|
| 2021 | Cordmaker | Galerio | Dixie Drawl | 9 |
| 2020 | Senior Investment | Name Changer | Alwaysmining | 7 |
| 2019 | Cordmaker | Unbridled Juan | Bonus Points | 7 |
| 2018 | Something Awesome | Zanotti | Discreet Lover | 8 |
| 2017 | Matt King Coal | Afleet Willy | Kaitain | 9 |
| 2016 | No Race | No Race | No Race | n/a |
| 2015 | Page McKenney | Adirondack King | Souper Lucky | 5 |
| 2014 | Ground Transport | Swift Warrior | Behemoth | 8 |
| 2013 | Norman Asbjornson | Eighttofasttocatch | Javerre | 6 |
| 2012 | Eighttofasttocatch | Cherokee Artist | Indian Jones | 6 |
| 2011 | Eighttofasttocatch | Marilyn's Guy | No Advantage | 7 |
| 2010 | Indian Dance | Lord Justice | Eddie C | 6 |
| 2009 | Bullsbay | Senor | Admiral’s Cruise | n/a |
| 2008 | Arcata | Eddie C. | Forty Crowns | n/a |
| 2007 | Sweetnorthernsaint | Capac | Future Fantasy | n/a |
| 2006 | Reckless Ways | Your Bluffing | Speed Whiz | n/a |
| 2005 | Lusty Latin | Ouagadougou | Jim Thirds Bolero | n/a |
| 2004 | Jorgie Stover | Your Bluffing | Last Intention | n/a |
| 2003 | P Day | Lyracist | My Request | n/a |
| 2002 | First Amendment | P Day | Lyracist | n/a |
| 2001 | Duckhorn | Do I Ever | Mercaldo | n/a |
| 2000 | S W Clarence | Thunder Flash | Sly Joe | n/a |
| 1999 | Fred Bear Claw | Eastern Daydream | Red Classic | n/a |
| 1998 | Big Rut | Testafly | Fireside Brass | n/a |
| 1997 | Western Echo | Meadow Lad | Colonial Secretary | n/a |
| 1996 | Michael's Star | Sunny Sunrise | Fireside Brass | n/a |
| 1995 | Super Memory | Excellent Tipper | Owned by Us | n/a |
| 1994 | Local Problem | Gala Spinaway | Slick Horn | n/a |
| 1993 | Ibex | Ameri Valay | Forry Cow How | n/a |
| 1992 | Gala Spinaway | Flaming Emperor | Valley Crossing | n/a |
| 1991 | Due North | Baldski's Choice | Lance | n/a |
| 1990 | Due North | Jet Stream | Learned Jake | n/a |
| 1989 | Baldski's Choice | Due North | Little Bold John | n/a |
| 1988 | Entertain | Due North | American Dream | n/a |
| 1987 | Midnight Call | Sparrowvon | Rocket Guitar | n/a |
| 1986 | Sparrowvon | Cywan | Brilliant Stepper | n/a |

== See also ==
- Harrison E. Johnson Memorial Handicap
- Laurel Park Racecourse
