= Fire Plug Stakes top three finishers =

This is a listing of the horses that finished in either first, second, or third place and the number of starters in the Fire Plug Stakes, an American open stakes race for horses four years old and older at six furlongs on dirt held at Laurel Park Racecourse in Baltimore, Maryland. (List 1993–present)

Year	Winner	Second	Third	Starters
2018	Awesome Banner	It's the Journey	Something Awesome	12
2017	Imperial Hunt	Chublicious	Sonny Inspired	8
2016	Sonny Inspired	Majestic Hussar	Beach Hut	10
2015	Never Stop Looking	Smash and Grab	Cutty Shark	7
2014	Broad Rule	Service for Ten	Warrioroftheroses	9
2013	Broad Rule	Harbor Kid	Flattering Andy	9
2012	No Race	No Race	No Race	0
2011	No Race	No Race	No Race	0
2010	Digger	Celtic Innis	Malibu Kid	n/a
2009	Suave Jazz	Yes It's the Truth	Springs Road	n/a
2008	Ah Day	Cognac Kisses	Lemons of Love	n/a
2007	Ah Day	Crafty Schemer	Gold Cluster	n/a
2006	Abbondanza	Crafty Schemer	Dale's Prospect	n/a
2005	No Race	No Race	No Race	0
2004	Sassy Hound	Out of Fashion	Cherokee's Boy	n/a
2003	Love Happy	Pioneer Boy	Sassy Hound	n/a
2002	Deer Run	Stormin Oedy	Wild Current	n/a
2001	Disco Rico	In C C's Honor	Dr. Max	n/a
2000	Memory Tap	Dr. Max	Changing Otheguard	n/a
1999	Wire Me Collect	Greenspring Willy	Baccarat	n/a
1998	Jove Stone	Star Trace	Achieve	n/a
1997	Mary's Buckaroo	Aberfoyle	Romano Gucci	n/a
1996	No Race	No Race	No Race	0
1995	Tidal Surge	Alleged Impression	Goldminer's Dream	n/a
1994	Secret Odds	Smart Alec	Majesty's Turn	n/a
1993	Fighting Notion	One Tuff Oop	Charlie You Know	n/a
