= Maryland Racing Media Stakes top three finishers and starters =

This is a listing of the horses that finished in either first, second, or third place and the number of starters in the Maryland Racing Media Stakes, an American stakes race for fillies and mares three years-old and up at one and one eighth miles on dirt held at Laurel Park Racecourse in Laurel, Maryland. (List 1992-present)

Year	Winner	Second	Third	Starters
2018	Miss Inclusive	Line of Best Fit	In the Navy Now	10
2017	Winter	Bawlmer Hon	Love Came to Town	7
2016	Pangburn	Joint Return	Mei Ling	10
2015	Lunar Surge	Flores Island	Luna Time	11
2014	Ilikecandy	Malibu Red	Lunar Surge	6
2013	Moon Philly	Access to Charlie	Touch the Birds	8
2012	Lacie Slew	Baltimore Belle	Pilot Point Lady	5
2011	Potosina	Blessed Soul	Princess Nyla	7
2010	Miss Singhsix	Love's Blush	My Main Starr	6
2009	Hello Poochi Pooh	Peachy Kiss	Clara’s Song	5
2008	Cryptoquip	All Smiles	Hanalei Bay	n/a
2007	Lexi Star	It's True Love	Raging Rapids	n/a
2006	Sticky	Dynamic Deputy	Sassy Love	n/a
2005	Friel's for Real	Pour It On	Summer Rainbow	n/a
2004	Undercover	Friel's for Real	Database	n/a
2003	Pupil	Special County	True Sensation	n/a
2002	Irving's Baby	Maria	Double Trick	n/a
2001	Irving's Baby	Back In Shape	Unbridled Lady	n/a
2000	Tookin Down	Inn Between	Saratoga Friends	n/a
1999	Merengue	Proud Run	Hot Salsa	n/a
1998	G. O'Keefe	See Your Point	Double Stake	n/a
1997	Miss Slewpy	Aileen's Countess	North Hall Betty	n/a
1996	Cormorant's Flight	Dancing Lassy	Night Fax	n/a
1995	Miss Slewpy	Part With Pride	Buffels	n/a
1994	Buffels	Stem the Tide	Broad Gains	n/a
1993	Ritchie Trail	Buffels	Richard's Lass	n/a
1992	Risen Colony	Wait for the Lady	Gala Goldilocks	n/a

== See also ==
- Maryland Racing Media Stakes
- Laurel Park Racecourse
