= J. Willard Thompson =

American racehorse trainer (1935–2018)

Personal information
- Born: March 30, 1935 Atlanta, Georgia, U.S.
- Died: November 3, 2018 (aged 83) Colts Neck Township, New Jersey, U.S.
- Occupation: Trainer

Horse racing career
- Sport: Horse racing

Major racing wins
- Miss Woodford Stakes (1976); Monmouth Oaks (1985); Young America Stakes (1989); Blue Sparkler Stakes (1991); Cicada Stakes (1994); Fair Haven Handicap (1997); Spruce Fir Handicap (2007); Jersey Girl Handicap (2007); Laurel Dash Stakes (2017)

Racing awards
- Monmouth Park Champion trainer (1975, 1976, 1977, 2001); Meadowlands Racetrack Champion trainer (1980, 1981)

Honors
- Raines Distinguished Achievement Award (1996)

Significant horses
- Roanoake

J. Willard Thompson (March 30, 1935 – November 3, 2018) was an American Thoroughbred racehorse trainer. A former steeplechase jockey, he won three straight training titles at Monmouth Park Racetrack between 1975 and 1977 and again won in 2001. He also earned back-to-back titles at the Meadowlands Racetrack in 1980 and 1981.

Willard Thompson is the co-holder of two major training records at Monmouth Park. He is tied with John Tammaro III for most races won during a race meeting with fifty-five, and tied with John H. Forbes for most wins on a single racecard with four.

In 1996, Thompson was the first recipient of Monmouth Park Racetrack's Virgil W. Raines Distinguished Achievement Award for his dedication to the sport of Thoroughbred racing through exemplary conduct demonstrating professionalism and integrity.

Thompson died in 2018 at the age of 83.
