= Jessica Pyfer =

Female Jockey

Personal information
- Born: 1998 (age 27–28) Denver, Colorado, US
- Education: Azusa Pacific College
- Occupation(s): Jockey, trick rider
- Years active: 2020–2023
- Height: 5 ft 2 in (157 cm)
- Weight: 110 lb (50 kg)

Sport
- Country: United States
- Sport: Horse racing
- Turned pro: 2020
- Retired: 2023

Jessica Pyfer (1998—) is a retired American jockey and the 2021 Eclipse Award winner as outstanding apprentice jockey. Pyfer was the third woman to win the award.

== Riding career ==
Pyfer competed in her first riding event at age 4. At 16, she got her racetrack license and began galloping horses for Phil D'Amato and other trainers. After being asked by Hall-of-Fame trainer Richard Mandella to gallop some of his horses, she began her riding career. She began riding races at Santa Anita in September 2020 and won her first race on October 9, 2020. She set a likely-record in Southern California as the first female apprentice rider to win four races in an afternoon on May 16, 2021, at Santa Anita.

Pyfer won the 2021 Eclipse Award at age 23, leading all North American apprentices by mount earnings and finishing second in wins. She was the third woman to win the award and one of six Santa Anita-based riders to be named Champion Apprentice. She rode 56 winners out of 535 mounts through the end of her apprentice allowance and earned $2,738,863.

Pyfer retired from race riding in 2023 to take on a position as a full-time racing analyst with Santa Anita/XBTV. Her career record was 88-89-106 from 819 mounts and $4,210,897 in purse earnings.

== Personal life ==
Pyfer's father Roger was a jockey. Her mother Sherri Alexander is an exercise rider who gallops horses for her husband, trainer Phil D'Amato. She graduated from Azusa-Pacific College with a degree in political science.
