= Cicada Stakes =

Horse race in New York, U.S.

- Class: Ungraded
- Location: Aqueduct Racetrack; Queens, New York USA
- Inaugurated: 1993
- Race type: Thoroughbred – Flat racing
- Website: www.nyra.com/aqueduct/racing/stakes-schedule/cicada/

Race information
- Distance: 6 furlongs (3/4 mile)
- Surface: Dirt
- Track: left-handed
- Qualification: Three-year-old fillies
- Weight: Assigned
- Purse: $100,000

The Cicada Stakes is an American Thoroughbred horse race run annually at Aqueduct Racetrack in Queens, New York. Inaugurated in 1993, the Cicada Stakes was run at a distance of seven furlongs until 2006 when it was modified to six furlongs. It is a black type stakes race with a purse of $100,000 and has been a prep race to the Triple Tiara of Thoroughbred Racing, including the Kentucky Oaks, the Black-Eyed Susan Stakes and Mother Goose Stakes.

The race is named for the U.S. Racing Hall of Fame filly, Cicada. Owned by the renowned Meadow Stable of Christopher Chenery, she was voted champion two-year-old filly in 1961, champion three-year-old filly in 1962, and champion handicap filly or mare in 1963. There was no running in 2020.

== Records ==
Speed record:

- 1:09.66 @ 6 furlongs (3/4 mile): Wild Gams (2006)
- 1:22.38 @ 7 furlongs (7/8 mile): Our Royal Blue (1994)

Most wins by a jockey:

- 2 – Eddie Castro (2013, 2014)
- 2 – Alan Garcia (2005, 2008)
- 2 – Rick Wilson (1994, 2001)
- 2 – Kendrick Carmouche (2017, 2022)
- 2 – Manuel Franco (2016, 2024)

Most wins by a trainer:

- 4 – Todd A. Pletcher (1998, 2002, 2004, 2016)

Most wins by an owner:

- 2 – Shadwell Stable (2013, 2014)
- 2 – William K. Warren Jr. (2008, 2010)
- 2 – Zayat Stables (2009, 2018)

== Winners ==
Year	Winner	Jockey	Trainer	Owner	Dist. (Furlongs)	Time	Win$
2024	Ghalia Princess	Manuel Franco	Brad H. Cox	Sumaya U.S. Stable	6 F	1:09.85	$55,000
2023	Downtown Mischief	Jose Lezcano	Linda L. Rice	Lady Shelia Stables	6 F	1:13.72	$55,000
2022	Lady Scarlet	Kendrick Carmouche	Michael J. Maker	Paradise Farms Crop. & David Staudacher	6 F	1:11.17	$55,000
2021	Just Read It	Dylan Davis	Raymond Handal	Ken Russell, Brown Road Racing, & Raymond Handal	6 F	1:12.81	$55,000
2020	Race not held						
2019	Workaholic	Cory Orm	Laura Wohlers	James McIngvale	6 F	1:13.19	$60,000
2018	Lezendary	Trevor McCarthy	Rudy R. Rodriguez	Zayat Stables	6 F	1:11.16	$60,000
2017	Bluegrass Flag	Kendrick Carmouche	Thomas Morley	Thomas C. Albrecht, Vincent J. Fusaro	6 F	1:11.99	$60,000
2016	Lost Raven	Manuel Franco	Todd A. Pletcher	Repole Stable	6 F	1:12.08	$75,000
2015	Noble and a Beauty	José Ortiz	Richard A. Violette Jr.	My Meadowview Farm	6 F	1:13.74	$60,000
2014	Mamdooha	Eddie Castro	Kiaran McLaughlin	Shadwell Stable	6 F	1:12:13	$60,000
2013	Elghayoor	Eddie Castro	Kiaran McLaughlin	Shadwell Stable	6 F	1:09.82	$60,000
2012	Agave Kiss	Ryan Curatolo	Rudy R. Rodriguez	Flying Zee Stable	6 F	1:11.76	$90,000
2011	Quantum Miss	Cornelio Velásquez	Tony Dutrow	Daniel M. Ryan	6 F	1:11.99	$60,000
2010	Liam's Dream	Rosie Napravnik	Anthony W. Dutrow	Suzanne Warren & William K. Warren Jr.	6 F	1:10.10	$60,000
2009	Heart Ashley	Chuck C. Lopez	Steven M. Asmussen	Zayat Stables	6 F	1:09.68	$64,380
2008	Carolyn's Cat	Alan Garcia	Kiaran McLaughlin	William K. Warren Jr.	6 F	1:10.16	$64,800
2007	Control System	Julian Pimentel	Michael J. Trombetta	Thomas McClay & Harry Nye	6 F	1:10.43	$65,760
2006	Wild Gams	Eibar Coa	Benjamin W. Perkins Jr.	New Farm	6 F	1:09.66	$66,360
2005	Dixie Talking	Alan Garcia	Robin L. Graham	Skeedattle Stable	7 F	1:23.04	$65,880
2004	Bohemian Lady	Edgar Prado	Todd A. Pletcher	Padua Stables	7 F	1:23.22	$65,460
2003	Cyber Secret	Shaun Bridgmohan	Richard E. Dutrow Jr.	Sanford Goldfarb, Irwin Goldfarb & Team Julep Stable	7 F	1:22.55	$64,980
2002	Proper Gamble	Javier Castellano	Todd A. Pletcher	Stoneway Farm	7 F	1:23.32	$65,160
2001	Xtra Heat	Rick Wilson	John Salzman	Kenneth Taylor	7 F	1:23.29	$63,770
2000	Finder's Fee	Jerry D. Bailey	Claude R. McGaughey III	Ogden Phipps	7 F	1:23.07	$65,100
1999	Potomac Bend	Mark T. Johnston	Vincent L. Blengs	Wayne Harrison	7 F	1:23.18	$48,915
1998	Jersey Girl	Richard Migliore	Todd A. Pletcher	Ackerley Bros. Farm	7 F	1:22.95	$50,175
1997	Vegas Prospector	Michael McCarthy	Daniel Lopez	Raymond Dweck	7 F	1:26.23	$48,375
1996	J J'sdream	Gary Boulanger	Edward Plesa Jr.	John A. Franks	7 F	1:23.44	$50,310
1995	Lucky Lavender Gal	Robbie Davis	William White	Dolores Worswick	7 F	1:23.80	$48,870
1994	Our Royal Blue	Rick Wilson	J. Willard Thompson	Cort N Trak Stable	7 F	1:22.38	$48,375
1993	Personal Bid	José A. Santos	Richard Schosberg	Dale H. Austin	7 F	1:23.52	$31,900

== See also ==
- Road to the Kentucky Oaks
