= Pennsylvania Governor's Cup Stakes =

Pennsylvania Governor's Cup
- Class: Ungraded stakes
- Location: Penn National Race Course; Grantville, Pennsylvania, United States
- Inaugurated: 1973
- Race type: Thoroughbred - Flat racing
- Website: www.hollywoodpnrc.com/racing

Race information
- Distance: 1 1/16 miles
- Surface: Turf
- Track: Left-handed
- Qualification: Three years old & up
- Purse: US$150,000

The Pennsylvania Governor's Cup Stakes is an American Thoroughbred horse race held annually at Penn National Race Course since 1973. The race was run in two divisions in 1973. It was a Grade III event from 1982 through 1989.

Race distances & surface:

- 1973–1979 : 1-1/16 miles on dirt
- 1979–2001 : 1-1/16 miles on turf
- 2002–2006 : 5 furlongs on turf
- 2007 : 5 furlongs on dirt
- 2008–2019 : 5 furlongs on turf
- 2025-present: 1-1/16 miles on turf

== Records ==
Speed record:

- 5 furlongs on turf : 2002, Bop, 0:54.61
- 1-1/16 miles on turf : 1980, Told, 1:38 flat
- 1-1/16 miles on dirt : 1978, A Letter To Harry, 1:41.20

Most wins:

- 2 – Tightend Touchdown (2013, 2014)

Most wins by a jockey:

- 3 – Javier Castellano (2008, 2013, 2014)

Most wins by a trainer:

- 2 – Daniel Perlsweig (1973, 1974)
- 2 – H. Allen Jerkens (1979, 1983)
- 2 – Jason Servis (2013, 2014)
- 2 – King T. Leatherbury (2007, 2011)
- 2 – Michael J. Trombetta (2002, 2006)
- 2 – Michael W. Dickinson (1990, 1996)

Most wins by an owner:

- 2 – Thomas G. McClay (2006, 2012)
- 2 – Mr. Amore Stables (2013, 2014)

== Winners ==
Year	Winner	Age	Jockey	Trainer	Owner	Dist. (F/M)	Time	Purse$	Gr.
2026	Bartlett	5	Frankie Pennington	John C. Servis	Newell Thoroughbred	1-1/16 m	1:39.47	$150,000	L/R|-
2025	Emmanuel	6	Jomar Torres	Michael J. Maker	Chambers, Case, Staudacher, David, Hui, Michael M. and Fugget About It Racing Stables	1-1/16 m	1:40.46	$150,000	L/R
2020-2024	Race Not Held								
2019	Pure Sensation	8	Kendrick Carmouche	Christophe Clement	Patricia Generazio	5 f	0:58.03	$100,000	L/R
2018	Oak Bluffs	8	Paco Lopez	Mary E. Eppler	Mary E. Eppler Racing Stable Inc.	5 f	0:56.10	$200,000	
2017	Bold Thunder	7	Irad Ortiz Jr.	Patricia Farro	Andrew Sulley	5 f	0:55.75	$200,000	
2016	Take Cover	4	Joe Bravo	Alan E. Goldberg	Colts Neck Stables LLC (Richard Santulli)	5 f	0:56.00	$150,000	
2015	Amelia's Wild Ride	4	Jose Lezcano	Ramon Preciado	Silver Trail Stables LLC	5 f	0:55.20	$150,000	
2014	Tightend Touchdown	5	Javier Castellano	Jason Servis	Mr. Amore Stables (Ron Lombardi)	5 f	0:56.77	$150,000	
2013	Tightend Touchdown	4	Javier Castellano	Jason Servis	Mr. Amore Stables (Ron Lombardi)	5 f	0:54.62	$150,000	
2012	Kyma	4	Dana G. Whitney	Brandon L. Kulp	Thomas G. McClay	5 f	0:56.58	$200,000	
2011	Ben's Cat	5	Jeremy Rose	King T. Leatherbury	The Jim Stable	5 f	0:56.48	$200,000	
2010	Chamberlain Bridge	6	Jamie Theriot	W. Bret Calhoun	Carl R. Moore Management, LLC	5 f	0:55.06	$200,000	
2009	Cardashi	7	David Cora	Timothy C. Kreiser	Mason Dixon Stable	5 f	0:56.23	$200,000	
2008	Hero's Reward	6	Javier Castellano	Dale Capuano	Rob Ry Farm & Jayne Marie Slysz	5 f	0:55.14	$100,000	
2007	Mr Mutter	6	Jonathan Joyce	King T. Leatherbury	Stanley Stables	5 f	0:57.46	$50,000	
2006	Procreate	8	Rosie Napravnik	Michael J. Trombetta	Thomas G. McClay & Harry Nye	5 f	0:55.46	$50,000	
2005	Tacirring	6	Roberto Alvarado Jr.	Scott A. Lake	Joseph Besecker, Gary Gasper, Charles Mady	5 f	0:54.80	$50,000	
2004	Rudirudy	9	Roberto J. Rosado	Gaston D. Sandoval	Gaston D. Sandoval	5 f	0:57.82	$50,000	
2003	Namequest	7	C. Omar Klinger	Benjamin M. Feliciano Jr.	Taking Risks Stables	5 f	0:56.71	$50,000	
2002	Bop	5	Phil Teator	Michael J. Trombetta	Folly Quarter Stable (Jonas Cash)	5 f	0:54.6	$50,000	
2001	Buenos Dias	7	Harry Vega	Lawrence E. Murray	Sondra Bender	1-1/16 m	1:40.10	$100,000	
2000	Tappat	5	Ricky Frazier	Thomas M. Greene	Tega Farm	1-1/16 m	1:39.85	$100,000	
1999	Majestic Jove	5	Michael J. McCarthy	Randy V. Nunley	Michael W. Jester	1-1/16 m	1:42.21	$100,000	
1998	Rob 'n Gin	4	Joe Bravo	Robert A. Barbara	Sabine Stable (Joseph & Winnie Greeley)	1-1/16 m	1:40.39	$100,000	
1997	Joker	5	Herb McCauley	Guadalupe Preciado	Briardale Stable	1-1/16 m	1:39.26	$100,000	
1996	Da Hoss	4	Frank T. Alvarado	Michael W. Dickinson	Prestonwood Farm & Wallstreet Racing Stables	1-1/16 m	1:41.20	$100,000	
1995	Rare Reason	4	Tracy Hebert	Walter M. Bindner Jr.	Mason C. Rudd	1-1/16 m	1:39.20	$65,000	
1994	Beau Fasa	8	Paul Patrick Ravera	Gordon C. Colbourne	Box Arrow Farm (Shirley Thomas)	1-1/16 m	1:41.40	$65,000	
1993	Explosive Jeff	5	Heberto Castillo Jr.	Frank J. Lange	Elaine J. Meltzer	1-1/16 m	1:38.40	$65,000	
1992	Social Retiree	5	Walter Guerra	Barclay Tagg	Barclay Tagg	1-1/16 m	1:39.60	$65,000	
1991	Finder's Choice	6	Rudy B. Aviles	Charles H. Hadry	Locust Hill Farm	1-1/16 m	1:39.40	$60,000	
1990	Ligature	4	Robert E. Colton	Michael W. Dickinson	Mark I. Marcus	1-1/16 m	1:40.60	$65,000	
1989	Mister Modesty	4	Marco Castaneda	Stephen Bailey	Richard E. Bailey	1-1/16 m	1:43.80	$65,000	G3
1988	Icy Groom	5	John David Melendez	James M. Casey	Cinemod Stable	1-1/16 m	1:45.20	$65,000	G3
1987	Land of Believe	6	Buddy G. Winnett Jr.	Billy J. Henry	Robert W. Dommel	1-1/16 m	1:42.00	$50,000	G3
1986	Ronbra	6	Stephen R. Pagano	Joe Orseno	Four Peers Stable	1-1/16 m	1:40.40	$50,000	G3
1985	Danger's Hour	3	Jerry D. Bailey	MacKenzie Miller	Rokeby Stable	1-1/16 m	1:39.60	$50,000	G3
1984	Castelets	5	Jack Kaenel	Ronald C. Cartwright	Buckingham Farm (E. Edward Houghton)	1-1/16 m	1:39.60	$50,000	G3
1983	John's Gold	4	Jacinto Vásquez	H. Allen Jerkens	Hobeau Farm	1-1/16 m	1:41.00	$50,000	G3
1982	Explosive Bid	4	Vincent Bracciale Jr.	Richard W. Delp	Hawksworth Farm (Harry Meyerhoff)	1-1/16 m	1:43.80	$50,000	G3
1981	Colonel Moran	4	Craig Perret	Thomas J. Kelly	Townsend B. Martin	1-1/16 m	1:39.00	$50,000	
1980	Told	4	Jean-Luc Samyn	Philip G. Johnson	Meadowhill Farm (Morton Rosenthal & Alfred Green)	1-1/16 m	1:38.00	$50,000	
1979	Sensitive Prince	4	Jacinto Vásquez	H. Allen Jerkens	Top the Marc Stable (Joseph Taub)	1-1/16 m	1:42.20	$50,000	
1978	A Letter to Harry	4	Eddie Delahoussaye	John Oxley	Estate of Raymond F. Salmen	1-1/16 m	1:41.20	$50,000	
1977	Swinging Hal	4	Stephen R. Pagano	James W. Woods	John Martin	1-1/16 m	1:41.40	$50,000	
1976	Visier *	4	Rene Riera Jr.	Richard J. Fischer	Juliette Combs Trapp	1-1/16 m	1:42.80	$25,000	
1975	Festive Mood	6	Herberto Hinojosa	Richard W. Small	Sally M. Gibson	1-1/16 m	1:43.00	$25,000	
1974	Mongongo	5	Buck Thornburg	Daniel Perlsweig	Marion duPont Scott	1-1/16 m	1:42.00	$25,000	
1973-2	Mr. Correlation	4	Buck Thornburg	Daniel Perlsweig	Mrs. Robert S. Lytle	1-1/16 m	1:42.20	$15,000	
1973-1	Kiss and Run	5	Don Meade Jr.	Marion F. Holman	Olin H. Wienges & Son	1-1/16 m	1:42.40	$15,000	

- *1976: Visier won race but was disqualified to third.
