= Virgil W. Raines Distinguished Achievement Award =

US thoroughbred racing award

The Virgil "Buddy" Raines Distinguished Achievement Award was established in 1996 by Monmouth Park Racetrack in Oceanport, New Jersey in honor of the trainer, Virgil W. Raines. The annual award honors an owner or trainer competing at the track who has shown a dedication to the sport of Thoroughbred racing through exemplary conduct demonstrating professionalism and integrity.

== Recipients ==
- 1996 - J. Willard Thompson
- 1997 - Daniel Perlsweig
- 1998 - Warren A. Croll Jr.
- 1999 - Joseph H. Pierce Jr.
- 2000 - Peter Shannon
- 2001 - Dennis Drazin
- 2002 - Sam Fieramosca
- 2003 - Charles & Marianne Hesse
- 2004 - Janet Laszlo
- 2005 - Richard Malouf
- 2006 - John H. Forbes
- 2007 - Ben W. Perkins Sr.
- 2008 - Gerald & Carolyn Sleeter
- 2012 - John Mazza
- 2013 - Everett "Ebby" Novak
- 2014 - Chuck Spina
- 2015 - Bob Baffert
- 2016 - Ed Barney
- 2017 - Bob Kulina
- 2018 - Mike Musto
- 2019 - Tim Hills
- 2020 - Leonard Green
- 2021 - Bill Anderson
- 2022 - Millie Fleming
