= Mark T. Johnston =

Retired American jockey

Mark Johnston
Personal information
- Born: November 15, 1970 (age 55) Lebanon, Kentucky
- Occupation: Jockey

Horse racing career
- Sport: Horse racing
- Career wins: 3085

Major racing wins
- Conniver Stakes (1990, 1996); Margate Handicap (1990); Caesar's Wish Stakes (1992, 2000); Bourbonette Oaks (1993); Maryland Million Classic (1994); Maryland Racing Media Stakes (1994, 1998); Philip H. Iselin Stakes (1994); William Donald Schaefer Handicap (1994); John B. Campbell Handicap (1995); Wide Country Stakes (1995, 1996, 2000); Chick Lang Stakes (1996); Maryland Million Ladies (1996, 2000); Miracle Wood Stakes (1996 ) Skipat Stakes (1996); Anne Arundel Stakes (1997, 1998); Maryland Million Sprint Handicap (1997, 2000); Twixt Stakes (1998); All Brandy Stakes (1999); Cicada Stakes (1999); Horatius Stakes (1999, 2002); Jameela Stakes (1999, 2000); Laurel Dash Stakes (1999); Marshua Stakes (1999); Maryland Million Lassie (1999); Astarita Stakes (2000); Blue Hen Stakes (2000); Fire Plug Stakes (2000); Laurel Turf Cup Stakes (2000); Squan Song Stakes (2000); Federico Tesio Stakes (2001); Hilltop Stakes (2001); Selima Stakes (2002)

Racing awards
- U.S. Champion Apprentice Jockey (1990)

Significant horses
- Xtra Heat, Taking Risks, Victory Gallop

Mark T. Johnston (born November 15, 1970, in Lebanon, Kentucky) is a retired American jockey in thoroughbred horse racing who was voted the 1990 Eclipse Award for Outstanding Apprentice Jockey in the United States.

Riding from 1989 through 2004, Mark Johnston won 3085 races.
