= Eclipse Award for Outstanding Apprentice Jockey =

The Eclipse Award for Outstanding Apprentice Jockey is an American thoroughbred horse racing honor. Created in 1971, it is part of the Eclipse Awards program honoring Champions in numerous horse racing categories. This article lists the annual winners of the Eclipse Award for a jockey undergoing their apprenticeship.

The 1977 winner, Steve Cauthen, also won the overall Eclipse Award for Outstanding Jockey that same year. Three women have won this Eclipse Award: Rosemary Homeister in 1992, Emma-Jayne Wilson in 2005, and Jessica Pyfer for 2021.

Past winners:

- 1971 : Gene St. Leon
- 1972 : Thomas Wallis
- 1973 : Steve Valdez
- 1974 : Chris McCarron
- 1975 : Jimmy Edwards
- 1976 : George Martens
- 1977 : Steve Cauthen
- 1978 : Ron Franklin
- 1979 : Cash Asmussen
- 1980 : Frank Lovato Jr.
- 1981 : Richard Migliore
- 1982 : Alberto Delgado
- 1983 : Declan Murphy
- 1984 : Wesley Ward
- 1985 : Art Madrid Jr.
- 1986 : Allen Stacy
- 1987 : Kent Desormeaux
- 1988 : Steve Capanas
- 1989 : Michael J. Luzzi
- 1990 : Mark T. Johnston
- 1991 : Mickey Walls
- 1992 : Rosemary Homeister
- 1993 : Juan Umana
- 1994 : Dale Beckner
- 1995 : Ramon B. Perez
- 1996 : Neil Poznansky
- 1997 : Roberto Rosado & Philip Teator (tie)
- 1998 : Shaun Bridgmohan
- 1999 : Ariel Smith
- 2000 : Tyler Baze
- 2001 : Jeremy Rose
- 2002 : Ryan Fogelsonger
- 2003 : Eddie Castro
- 2004 : Brian Hernandez Jr.
- 2005 : Emma-Jayne Wilson
- 2006 : Julien Leparoux
- 2007 : Joe Talamo
- 2008 : Pascacio "Paco" Lopez
- 2009 : Christian Santiago Reyes
- 2010 : Omar Moreno
- 2011 : Kyle Frey
- 2012 : Jose Montano
- 2013 : Victor Carrasco
- 2014 : Drayden Van Dyke
- 2015 : Tyler Gaffalione
- 2016 : Luis Ocasio
- 2017 : Evin A. Roman
- 2018 : Weston Hamilton
- 2019 : Kazushi Kimura
- 2020 : Alexander Crispin
- 2021 : Jessica Pyfer
- 2022 : Jose Antonio Gomez
- 2023 : Axel Concepcion
- 2024 : Erik Asmussen
- 2025 : Pietro Moran
