= Maryland Million Classic =

- Class: Restricted State-bred Stakes
- Location: Laurel Park Racecourse, Laurel, Maryland, United States
- Inaugurated: 1986
- Race type: Thoroughbred - Flat racing
- Website: www.marylandthoroughbred.com/newsindex.php?articleid=953

Race information
- Distance: 1 1/8 miles (9 furlongs)
- Surface: Dirt
- Track: left-handed
- Qualification: Three-year-olds and up
- Purse: $150,000

Maryland Million Classic is an American Thoroughbred horse race held annually in October since 1986 primarily at Laurel Park Racecourse in Laurel, Maryland or at Pimlico Race Course in Baltimore. To be eligible for the Maryland Million Classic, a horse must be sired by a stallion who stands in Maryland. Due to that restriction the race is classified as a non-graded or "listed" stakes race and is not eligible for grading by the American Graded Stakes Committee.

The race is part of Maryland Million Day, an 11-race program held in mid October that was the creation of renowned television sports journalist Jim McKay. The "Maryland Million" is the first State-Bred showcase event ever created. Since 1986, 27 other events in 20 states have imitated the showcase and its structure.

From its inception in 1986 through 1992, the race was run on dirt at a distance of one mile. From 1993 though 2008, it has been a 1 3/16 mile competition. Since 2009, it has been a 1 1/8 mile event and currently offers a purse of $150,000. In addition to the prize money, the winning owner receives a Maryland Million Waterford Crystal bowl.

In its 30th running in 2015, the race was restricted to those horses who were sired by a stallion who stands in the state of Maryland. Both the entrant horse and their stallion had to be nominated to the Maryland Million program.

The race itself has had many titles since 1986 due in large part to the aggressive marketing efforts of Maryland Million Limited, the series corporate founder. In its first seven years, from 1986 through 1992, the race was called the "Budweiser Maryland Million Classic." From 1993 through 1996 the race was known as the "First National Bank of Maryland Classic." From 1997 through 2004 the race was known as the "Cosamin DS Maryland Classic."

== Records ==
Speed record:

- 1 1/8 mile - 1:50.19 - Brilliant Ice (2024)
- 1 3/16 miles - 1:54.00 - Taking Risks (1994) & Frugal Doc (1996)
- 1 1/4 mile - 2:01.00 - Mister S. M. (1988)

Most wins by a horse: - Five horses have won the Maryland Million Classic twice:

- 3 - Eighttofasttocatch (2011, 2013, 2014)
- 2 - Admirals War Chest (2015, 2016)
- 2 - Docent (2002 & 2003)
- 2 - Algar (horse)|Algar (1997 & 1998)
- 2 - Timely Warning (1990 & 1991)

Most wins by an owner:

- 3 - Anderson Fowler

Most wins by a jockey:

- 3 - Edgar Prado
- 3 - Jeremy Rose
- 3 - Sheldon Russell

Most wins by a trainer:

- 3 - Timothy F. Ritchey
- 3 - Virgil W. Raines

== Winners of the Maryland Million Classic since 1986 ==
Year	Winner	Age	Jockey	Trainer	Owner	Dist. (Miles)	Time	Purse
2024	Brilliant Ice	5	Jeiron Barbosa	Annette M. Eubanks	Crystal Park Stables	1-1/8	1:50.19	$153,000
2023	Ain't Da Beer Cold	5	Jevian Toledo	Kenneth M. Cox	Spencer, Matt, Cox, Kelly Jo and Bonuccelli Racing	1-1/8	1:52.39	$150,000
2022	Ournationonparade	5	Jaime Rodriguez	Jamie Ness	Kernan Jr., Morris E., Yo Berbs and Jagger, Inc.	1-1/8	1:51.78	$150,000
2021	Prendemi	6	Mychel Sanchez	Luis Carvajal, Jr.	G. J. Stable	1-1/8	1:50.46	$150,000
2020	Monday Morning Qb	3	Sheldon Russell	Robert E. Reid Jr.	Cash is King LLC	1-1/8	1:48.13	$150,000
2019	Forest Fire	4	Paco Lopez	John C. Servis	Shirley A. Lojeski	1-1/8	1:50.42	$150,000
2018	Saratoga Bob	4	Edgar Prado	Katharine Voss	Robert Manfuso & Katharine Voss	1-1/8	1:51.28	$150,000
2017	Bonus Points	5	Nik Juarez	Todd Pletcher	Three Diamonds Farm	1-1/8	1:50.50	$150,000
2016	Admirals War Chest	5	Taylor M. Hole	Corby Caiazzo	Sinatra Thoroughbreds Racing	1-1/8	1:51.28	$150,000
2015	Admirals War Chest	4	Taylor M. Hole	Corby Caiazzo	Sinatra Thoroughbreds Racing	1-1/8	1:51.49	$150,000
2014	Eighttofasttocatch	8	Forest Boyce	Tim Keefe	Sylvia E. Heft	1-1/8	1:50.54	$150,000
2013	Eighttofasttocatch	7	Forest Boyce	Tim Keefe	Sylvia E. Heft	1-1/8	1:50.42	$150,000
2012	Not Abroad	5	Nick Petro	Michael Petro	Tim Cunningham	1-1/8	1:51.06	$150,000
2011	Eighttofasttocatch	5	Sheldon Russell	Tim Keefe	Dark Hollow Farm/ Herringswell Stable	1-1/8	1:50.65	$150,000
2010	Regal Solo	5	Sheldon Russell	Damon Dilodovico	Alvin M. Lapidus	1-1/8	1:51.43	$150,000
2009	Sumacha’hot	4	Grant Whitacre	Butch Cave	Butch Cave	1-1/8	1:50.26	$250,000
2008	Cuba	7	Pedro Cotto, Jr.	Bobby Dibona	Leo-Sag Stable	1-3/16	1:57.78	$300,000
2007	Evil Storm	6	Jeremy Rose	Michael Gorham	Old Coach Farm	1-3/16	1:58.19	$300,000
2006	Due	5	Rosie Napravnik	Dale Capuano	RobRy Farm/J. Slysz	1-3/16	1:58.38	$250,000
2005	Play Bingo	4	Ryan Fogelsonger	John R. S. Fisher	Erdenheim Farm	1-3/16	1:59.08	$250,000
2004	Presidentialaffair	5	Stewart Elliott	Martin E. Ciresa	Cirsea/Papapandrea	1-3/16	1:55.58	$200,000
2003	Docent	5	Clinton Potts	Timothy F. Ritchey	Mrs. Bernard J. Daney	1-3/16	1:54.94	$200,000
2002	Docent	4	Jeremy Rose	Timothy F. Ritchey	Mrs. Bernard J. Daney	1-3/16	1:56.85	$200,000
2001	Sumerset	4	Jeremy Rose	Timothy F. Ritchey	E & G Stables	1-3/16	1:57.20	$200,000
2000	Testing	7	Jose A. Velez, Jr.	Peter Fortay	Dennis A. Drazin	1-3/16	1:54.51	$200,000
1999	Perfect to a Tee	7	Alcibiades C. Cortez	Linda L. Albert	The Nonsequitur Stable	1-3/16	1:56.00	$200,000
1998	Algar	6	Edgar S. Prado	Barbara C. Graham	Barbara C. Graham	1-3/16	1:56.00	$200,000
1997	Algar	5	Edgar S. Prado	Barbara C. Graham	Barbara C. Graham	1-3/16	1:58.00	$200,000
1996	Frugal Doc	9	C. Omar Klinger	D. Scott Posey	L.W.B.R. Stable	1-3/16	1:54.00	$200,000
1995	Brilliant Patriot	4	Mario G. Pino	Vincent L. Blengs	W. Harrison/L. Pomerantz	1-3/16	1:58.00	$200,000
1994	Taking Risks	4	Mark T. Johnston	King T. Leatherbury	Lakeville Stables	1-3/16	1:54.00	$200,000
1993	Forry Cow How	5	Larry C. Reynolds	Ronald Cartwright	Buckingham Farm	1-3/16	1:55.00	$150,000
1992	Reputed Testamony	5	Kent Desormeaux	Richard Hemmings	Matt P. Kane et al.	1-1/4	2:03.00	$150,000
1991	Timely Warning	6	Mike Luzzi	Virgil W. Raines	Anderson Fowler	1-1/4	2:02.00	$200,000
1990	Timely Warning	5	Craig Perret	Virgil W. Raines	Anderson Fowler	1-1/4	2:02.00	$200,000
1989	Master Speaker	4	Julie Krone	Virgil W. Raines	Anderson Fowler	1-1/4	2:02.00	$200,000
1988	Mister S. M.	4	José A. Santos	Stephen L. DiMauro	S. F. Morrell	1-1/4	2:01.00	$200,000
1987	Little Bold John	5	Donnie Miller Jr.	Jerry Robb	John E. "Jack" Owens III	1-1/4	2:03.00	$200,000
1986	Herat	4	Jerry D. Bailey	Jack Van Berg	John A. Franks	1-1/4	2:03.00	$200,000

== See also ==
- Maryland Million Classic top three finishers
- Maryland Million Day
- Laurel Park Racecourse
