= Laurel Dash Stakes =

- Class: Ungraded stakes
- Location: Laurel Park, Laurel, Maryland, United States
- Inaugurated: 1988
- Race type: Thoroughbred - Flat racing

Race information
- Distance: 5 1/2 furlongs
- Surface: Turf
- Track: Left-handed
- Qualification: Three years old & up
- Purse: US$100,000

The Laurel Dash Stakes is a Thoroughbred horse race run annually at Laurel Park Racecourse at Laurel, Maryland. An ungraded stakes open to horses age three and older, it is raced on turf over a distance of five and one-half furlongs.

== Historical notes ==
The inaugural running took place on October 23, 1988 and was won by Daniel Wildenstein's outstanding runner, Steinlen. Once described as "probably the richest and most powerful art dealer on earth", Wildenstein named the horse for the French Art Nouveau painter Théophile Steinlen.

Inclement weather caused track officials to be concerned about the safety of the turf course in 1997 and 2011 resulting in those races being switched to the dirt track. Ben's Cat won that 2011 event and did it again in 2013. He is the only horse to have won the Laurel Dash twice and it is a noteworthy success in that one was on dirt and the other on grass.

== Records ==
Speed record:

- 1:01.71 @ current distance of 5 1/2 furlongs: Dubini (2019)
- 1:07.29 @ 6 furlongs: Jazzy Idea (2012)

Most wins:

- 2 - Ben's Cat (2011, 2013)

Most wins by a jockey:

- 2 - Laffit Pincay Jr. (1988, 1992)
- 2 - Edgar Prado (1996, 2016)
- 2 - Daniel Centeno (2017, 2019)

Most wins by a trainer:

- 2 - King T. Leatherbury (2011, 2013)

Most wins by an owner:

- 2 - The Jim Stable (2011, 2013)

== Winners ==
Year	Winner	Age	Jockey	Trainer	Owner	Dist. (Furlongs)	Time	Win $	Gr.
2020	Completed Pass	6	Angel Cruz	Claudio A. Gonzalez	Robert D. Bone	5.5 f	1:04.41	$60,000	
2019	Dubini	6	Daniel Centeno	Kathleen A. Demasi	Pewter Stable (Greg Demasi, partnership manager)	5.5 f	1:01.71	$60,000	
2018	Class and Cash	6	Feargal Lynch	Jane Cibelli	Edward J. Short	6 f	1:14.04	$60,000	
2017	Snowday	7	Daniel Centeno	J. Willard Thompson	Quiet Winter Farm	6 f	1:09.02	$60,000	
2016	Mosler	5	Edgar Prado	William I. Mott	Adele Dilschneider	6 f	1:08.26	$60,000	
2015	Spring to the Sky	6	Mike Luzzi	Bruce R. Brown	Anthony P. McCarthy	6 f	1:13.57	$60,000	
2014	Dreamsgonewild	5	Trevor McCarthy	Bruce F. Alexander	Paul M. Steckel	6 f	1:07.99	$60,000	
2013	Ben's Cat	7	Julian Pimentel	King T. Leatherbury	The Jim Stable	6 f	1:07.40	$60,000	
2012	Jazzy Idea	3	Elvis Trujillo	Edwin W. Merryman	Edwin W. Merryman	6 f	1:07.29	$90,000	
2011	Ben's Cat	5	Jeremy Rose	King T. Leatherbury	The Jim Stable	6 f (d)	1:11.11	$45,000	
2001	2010	Race not held							
2000	Texas Glitter	4	Aaron Gryder	Todd Pletcher	Dennis B. Swartz & Michael J. Ryan	6 f	1:08.00	$60,000	G3
1999	Grapeshot	5	Mark T. Johnston	Ann W. Merryman	Silhoutte Stable	6 f	1:12.80	$60,000	G3
1998	Howbaddouwantit	3	Dale Beckner	Benjamin W. Perkins Jr.	Larry F. Hall	6 f	1:08.63	$60,000	G3
1997	Wise Dusty	6	Oscar G. Mancilla	Wayne M. Bailey	Adrian L. "Les" Merton	6 f (d)	1:11.40	$60,000	G3
1996	Mayoumbe	3	Edgar Prado	John R. S. Fisher	Erdenheim Farm	6 f	1:16.00	$60,000	G3
1995	Race not held								
1994	Soviet Problem	4	Chris McCarron	Gregory G. Gilchrist	John Harris & Don Valpredo	6 f	1:09.00	$120,000	G3
1993	Home of the Free	5	Jean Cruguet	MacKenzie Miller	Rokeby Stables	6 f	1:11.20	$120,000	G3
1992	Glen Kate	4	Laffit Pincay Jr.	Bill Shoemaker	Bruce McNall & Wayne Gretsky	6 f	1:10.40	$150,000	G3
1991	Forest Glow	4	Angel Cordero Jr.	Brad MacDonald	John A. Bell III	6 f	1:11.40	$150,000	G3
1990	Roman Prose	5	Lanfranco Dettori	Jonathan Pease	Henry C. Seymour	6 f	1:09.80	$150,000	G3
1989	Cricket Ball	6	Gérald Mossé	John Fellows	Robin Scully	6 f	1:14.00	$150,000	
1988	Steinlen	5	Laffit Pincay Jr.	D. Wayne Lukas	Wildenstein Stable	6 f	1:10.40	$120,000	
