= Ben's Cat =

American-bred Thoroughbred racehorse

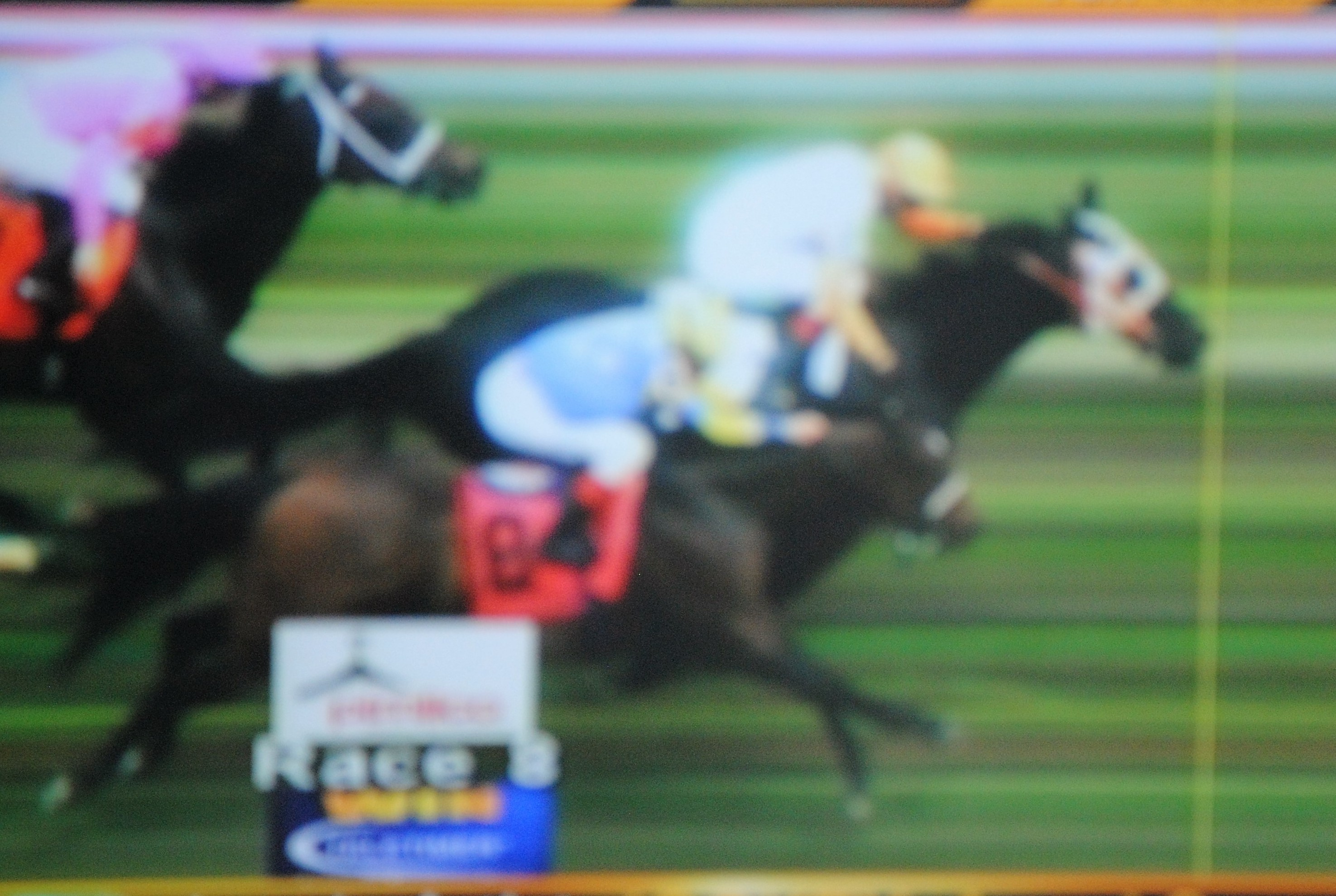
- Ben's Cat winning the 2016 Jim McKay Turf Sprint in a photo finish
- Sire: Parker's Storm Cat
- Grandsire: Storm Cat
- Dam: Twofox
- Damsire: Thirty Eight Paces
- Sex: Gelding
- Foaled: April 17, 2006 in Maryland
- Died: July 18, 2017 (aged 11)
- Country: United States
- Colour: Dark bay
- Breeder: K. T. Leatherbury Associates Inc.
- Owner: The Jim Stable
- Trainer: King T. Leatherbury
- Record: 63: 32-9-7
- Earnings: $2,643,782

Major wins
- Find Handicap (2010); Pennsylvania Governor's Cup Handicap (2011); Laurel Dash Stakes (2011,2013); Mister Diz Stakes (2010, 2011, 2012, 2013, 2014, 2015); Maryland Million Turf Sprint Handicap (2010, 2011, 2012); Jim McKay Turf Sprint (2011, 2013, 2014, 2015, 2016); Turf Monster Handicap (2011, 2012); Fabulous Strike Handicap (2012, 2013, 2014); Parx Dash Handicap (2012, 2013, 2014)

Honors
- Secretariat Vox Populi Award (2017); Ben's Cat Stakes at Laurel Park; Maryland-bred Horse of the Year (2011, 2012, 2013, 2014)
- Last updated on 1 May 2020

Ben's Cat (April 17, 2006 – July 18, 2017) was an American Thoroughbred racehorse who won 26 stakes races, including six victories in the Mister Diz Stakes and five in the Jim McKay Turf Sprint. He was a four-time Maryland-bred horse of the year and received the 2017 Secretariat Vox Populi Award. He was retired in June 2017 with a record of 32 wins from 63 starts and earnings of over $2.6 million. He died on July 18, 2017, due to complications related to colic surgery and was later buried at Laurel Park.

== Background ==
Ben's Cat was bred by King T. Leatherbury, who was also the nearly black gelding's owner and trainer. Ben's Cat was sired by Parker's Storm Cat, whose only win was a five-furlong sprint on the turf. Parker's Storm Cat was well bred, however, being by leading sire Storm Cat. Ben's Cat's dam, Twofox, was a stakes-placed mare by Thirty Eight Paces, a stakes-winning stallion also trained by Leatherbury.

Although Leatherbury is one of the winningest trainers in American racing history, his stable had shrunk to fourteen horses by the time Ben's Cat came along. In part because of the success of Ben's Cat, Leatherbury was inducted into the Hall of Fame in 2015 at age 82.

== Racing career ==
Ben's Cat suffered a broken pelvis at age two and spent nearly a year recovering, not making his first start until age four. On May 8, 2010, he won in his first start at Pimlico racetrack in a maiden claiming race, where he could have been purchased for $20,000. He won his second start on June 14 at Delaware Park, where he could have been claimed for $25,000. "Each time he ran, he got better," said Leatherbury. "I'm lucky I didn't lose him in that second claimer. Looking back now, I'd be sick if I had lost him."

Ben's Cat then went on a win streak, including his first stakes win on August 21 in the Mister Diz Stakes at Laurel Park. He gained a reputation as a talented "freak" who specialized in photo finish victories. On October 2, he won the Maryland Million Turf Sprint Handicap for the first time, followed by a win in the Find Handicap at a distance of 1 1/8 miles. His only loss in his four-year-old campaign came in the Forty Niner Stakes at Aqueduct on December 19. He was named the Maryland-bred champion sprinter and turf runner.

Although he had shown the ability to win on both dirt and turf, and had won at distances of up to nine furlongs, Leatherbury decided to focus the gelding on turf sprints in the mid-Atlantic racing circuit. Accordingly, Ben's Cat raced in many of the same races each year and established several notable win records:

- He won the Mister Diz Stakes six years in a row, from 2010 to 2015, plus a third in 2016.
- The horse was a three-time winner, all consecutive from 2010 to 2012, of the Maryland Million Turf Sprint Handicap. He also finished second in 2013 through 2015.
- He won the Jim McKay Turf Sprint at Pimlico Race Course five times, including four in a row from 2013 to 2016.
- He won the Grade III Turf Monster Handicap at Parx Racing in both 2011 and 2012. He also finished third in 2013 and second in 2014.
- He won the Grade III Parx Dash Handicap from 2012 to 2014, also finishing second in 2011 and third in 2016.

Ben's Cat also won the $250,000 Fabulous Strike Handicap on Parx Racing's main (dirt) track from 2012 to 2014.

Ben's Cat earned a dedicated following in the mid-Atlantic region. "One reason is he’s been around so long," said Leatherbury in 2015. "Most horses are a flash in the pan, and just when people start to like them, they disappear from the scene. But he comes back year after year, so his fans are able to share in his success."

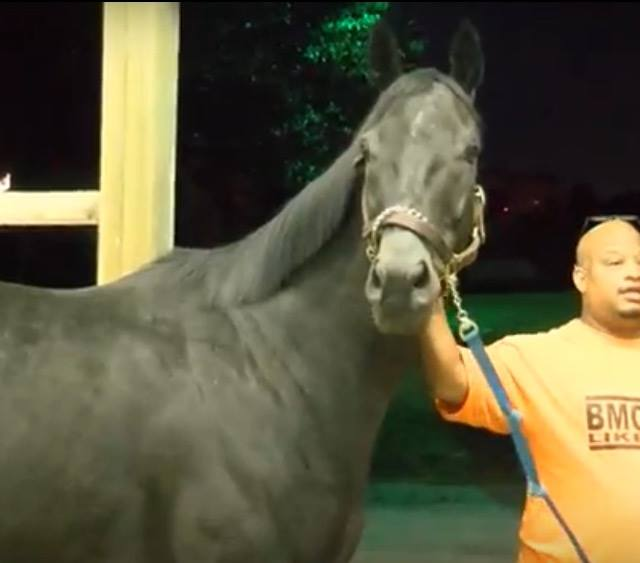
Ben's Cat leaving Laurel Park after he retired.

Ben's Cat's last win came on May 20, 2016, in the Jim McKay Turf Sprint, a race in which he was well behind and in heavy traffic with a quarter-mile remaining. "At no time in the race did he look like he was going to win," said Leatherbury. "He hits the top of the stretch and I'm just hoping for third money. And the next thing you know, he splits horses and sticks his nose out right at the wire. I get chills when I hear the replay of it."

Ben's Cat raced eight more times in the following months but finished no better than third. After he finished ninth in the Mister Diz Stakes on June 24, 2017, Leatherbury decided to retire the horse. "He just hadn't come back to last year's form," said Leatherbury. "He wasn't getting anything, and I just hated to see him keep going like that. It was time to draw a line."

Ben's Cat finished his career a record of 32 wins from 63 starts, including 26 stakes race victories. His earnings totalled over $2.6 million. He was retired at the Kentucky farm of Chris Welker, a long-time fan of the horse .

== Death ==
Shortly after his arrival at the farm, Ben's Cat suffered a serious bout of colic. On July 6, 2017, he underwent surgery at the Haygard Equine Medical Institute for an epiploic foramen entrapment, a condition that unlike typical cases of colic is unrelated to changes in diet or routine. He experienced severe post-operative complications and was humanely euthanized on July 18.

"I thought he had it licked," said Leatherbury. "I was bragging on him so. I said, 'Here's a winner. He beat the odds.' I've had it happen to a couple other horses and never had one survive ... It was devastating for me. It was a tragic end for a magnificent horse."

On November 11, Ben's Cat was buried on the northeast side of the paddock at Laurel Park.

== Honors ==
Ben's Cat was named the Maryland-bred Horse of the Year four times, from 2011 to 2014. He has also earned 17 divisional championships in the state-bred older horse, sprinter and turf horse categories.

In 2016, the Ben's Cat Stakes at Laurel Park for Maryland-bred horses was named in his honor. In 2017, Ben's Cat was named the winner of Secretariat Vox Populi Award, an award created by Penny Chenery to "honor the horses whose stories draw people to Thoroughbred racing and convert them to fans."

== Pedigree ==
Pedigree of Ben's Cat, gelding, 2006
| Sire Parker's Storm Cat 2000 | Storm Cat; 1983 | Storm Bird | Northern Dancer |
| Sire Parker's Storm Cat 2000 | Storm Cat; 1983 | Storm Bird | South Ocean |
| Sire Parker's Storm Cat 2000 | Storm Cat; 1983 | Terlingua | Secretariat |
| Sire Parker's Storm Cat 2000 | Storm Cat; 1983 | Terlingua | Crimson Saint |
| Sire Parker's Storm Cat 2000 | Macoumba; 1992 | Mr. Prospector | Raise a Native |
| Sire Parker's Storm Cat 2000 | Macoumba; 1992 | Mr. Prospector | Gold Digger |
| Sire Parker's Storm Cat 2000 | Macoumba; 1992 | Maximova (FR) | Green Dancer |
| Sire Parker's Storm Cat 2000 | Macoumba; 1992 | Maximova (FR) | Baracala |
| Dam Twofox 1993 | Thirty Eight Paces; 1978 | Nodouble | Noholme |
| Dam Twofox 1993 | Thirty Eight Paces; 1978 | Nodouble | Abla-Jay |
| Dam Twofox 1993 | Thirty Eight Paces; 1978 | Thirty Paces | Dancing Count |
| Dam Twofox 1993 | Thirty Eight Paces; 1978 | Thirty Paces | Band Book Sadye |
| Dam Twofox 1993 | Dronette; 1978 | Drone | Sir Gaylord |
| Dam Twofox 1993 | Dronette; 1978 | Drone | Cap and Bells |
| Dam Twofox 1993 | Dronette; 1978 | Stacey d'Ette | Pago Pago |
| Dam Twofox 1993 | Dronette; 1978 | Stacey d'Ette | Roger Ann (family: 9-f) |

Ben's Cat was inbred to Northern Dancer 4S × 5D, meaning Northern Dancer appears in the fourth generation of the sire's side of the pedigree and in the fifth generation of the dam's side of the pedigree. He was also inbred 5S x 5D to Somethingroyal, the dam of both Secretariat and Sir Gaylord.

== See also ==
- Repeat winners of horse races
