= Maryland Million Day =

Program of thoroughbred horse races

Jim McKay Maryland Million Day
- Class: State Championship Event Series
- Location: Laurel Park Racecourse; Laurel, Maryland, United States
- Inaugurated: 1986
- Race type: Thoroughbred
- Website: www.marylandmillion.com/million/

Race information
- Distance: See individual races
- Surface: Dirt and Turf
- Qualification: See individual races
- Weight: See individual races
- Purse: Varies by Race; Between $25,000 - $100,000

Jim McKay Maryland Million Day is an annual day of stakes races thoroughbred horse races operated by Maryland Million Limited, a company formed in 1985.

The Maryland Million is a one-day stakes program offering purses totaling $1 million, restricted to the nominated progeny of nominated stallions standing in the state. Jim McKay Maryland Million Day ranks as the highest single day in attendance, on-track wagering and simulcast handle for Laurel Park Racecourse in Laurel, Maryland annually. It ranks second in the state to only the Preakness Stakes Day card in all of those same categories and in purse money distributed. It ranks even higher than the Black-Eyed Susan Stakes Day card and the Frank J. De Francis Memorial Dash Stakes Day card (Laurel's signature race). It features 11 stakes races.

Jim McKay first conceived the idea of a day of races for Maryland-sired runners after attending the first Breeders' Cup in 1984. In September 1985, a nationally attended press conference at Pimlico outlined the details for a 9-race, $1 million program and introduced the 18-member Maryland Million committee. Richard W. Wilcke was named executive director of the Maryland Million. In December 1985, a total of 175 stallions were nominated to the Maryland Million by the first deadline, thus making their foals eligible for the program. Windfields Farm topped all nominators with 16 stallions, led by Northern Dancer, The Minstrel and the deceased Tentam. Nearly 900 horses of racing age were nominated by the May 15, 1986 deadline, at least 88 of them stakes winners or stakes placed. Another 700 yearlings were also nominated.

20,103 turn out at Laurel Park for the first Maryland Million Day on October 20, 1986. Northern Dancer sired two winners - Classic winner Herat and Turf Winner Glow. The first winner of a Maryland Million race was Sam-Son Farm's Canadian-bred Smart Halo. Sired by Windfields Farm's stallion Smarten, she captured the Lassie for 2-year-old fillies.

Governor William Donald Schaefer proclaimed the week leading up to the Maryland Million "Thoroughbred Week in Maryland", September 11-18, 1988.

On April 13, 2009, the Maryland legislature passed a joint resolution to officially rename the event "Jim McKay Maryland Million Day".

== Maryland Million races ==
- Maryland Million Classic
- Maryland Million Distaff Handicap
- Maryland Million Ladies
- Maryland Million Lassie
- Maryland Million Nursery
- Maryland Million Oaks
- Maryland Million Sprint Handicap
- Maryland Million Turf
- Maryland Million Turf Sprint Handicap

The Waterford Crystal factory in Ireland produced the unique trophies for Maryland Million Day. The permanent Maryland Million Trophy - a special 14" bowl that includes logos of all the first-year sponsors - is the largest single piece of hand-blown glass made in the company's history.
