= Michael J. Trombetta =

American Thoroughbred horse trainer (born 1966)

Mike Trombetta
Personal information
- Born: October 26, 1966 (age 59) Baltimore, Maryland, United States
- Occupation: Racehorse trainer

Horse racing career
- Sport: Horse racing
- Career wins: 2,154 (as at July 15, 2023)

Major racing wins
- Mister Diz Stakes (2002, 2003, 2006); Pennsylvania Governor's Cup Stakes (2002, 2006); Skipat Stakes (2004); Maryland Million Lassie (2006, 2010, 2014); Cicada Stakes (2007); Maryland Million Distaff (2008); Commonwealth Stakes (2009); Dahlia Stakes (2011); Maryland Million Oaks (2011); Fred W. Hooper Handicap (2011); Nearctic Stakes (2012); Conniver Stakes (2016); James W. Murphy Stakes (2016); Highlander Stakes (2019)

Racing awards
- Maryland Trainer of the Year (2005)

Significant horses
- Sweetnorthernsaint, Win Win Win
- Updated on May 12, 2019

Michael J. Trombetta (born October 26, 1966, in Baltimore, Maryland) is an American Thoroughbred horse trainer who began his training career in 1989 and who was the Maryland Trainer of the Year in 2005. Trombetta gained a national profile when Sweetnorthernsaint was the favorite for the 2006 Kentucky Derby. After coming in seventh in the Kentucky Derby, Sweetnorthernsaint later finished second in the 2006 Preakness. Trombetta returned to Churchill Downs to compete in the 2019 Kentucky Derby with Live Oak Plantation's colt, Win Win Win.
