= King T. Leatherbury =

American racehorse trainer (1933–2026)

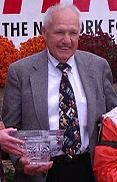

Personal information
- Born: March 26, 1933 Shady Side, Maryland, U.S.
- Died: February 10, 2026 (aged 92) Mitchellville, Maryland, U.S.
- Occupation: Trainer

Horse racing career
- Sport: Horse racing
- Career wins: 6,508

Major racing wins
- Roamer Handicap (1981); Gardenia Stakes (1987); Maryland Million Classic (1994); Philip H. Iselin Handicap (1994); Federico Tesio Stakes (2005, 2006); Pennsylvania Governor's Cup Handicap (2007, 2011); Toboggan Handicap (2009); Laurel Dash Stakes (2011, 2013)

Racing awards
- U.S. Champion Thoroughbred Trainer by wins (1977–1978); Leading Maryland trainer in wins (1993–1996)

Honours
- United States' Racing Hall of Fame (2015)

Significant horses
- Ah Day, Ben's Cat, I Am The Game, Thirty Eight Paces, Catatonic, Taking Risks, Malibu Moonshine
- Updated on February 12, 2007

King Taylor Leatherbury (March 26, 1933 – February 10, 2026) was an American Thoroughbred racehorse trainer who ranks fifth all-time in wins among U.S. trainers.

Called a Maryland racing legend by Churchill Downs, Leatherbury, along with John J. Tammaro, Jr., Richard E. Dutrow, Sr. and Hall of Fame inductee Bud Delp, were known as Maryland racing's "Big Four". They dominated racing in Maryland during the 1960s and 1970s and helped modernize flat racing training.

Born on a farm there, where his father raised horses, Leatherbury graduated from the University of Maryland with a degree in business administration then chose a career in thoroughbred racing. As a trainer, he won his first race in 1959 at Florida's Sunshine Park but made his reputation at racetracks in his native Maryland. He was the leading trainer at Delaware Park Racetrack on four occasions, won twenty titles at Laurel Park Racecourse and another twenty-five at Pimlico Race Course. He led all Maryland trainers in wins for four straight years between 1993 through 1996 and won five races in one day four times and on another occasion won six races on one card.

On April 20, 2015, Leatherbury's induction into the National Museum of Racing and Hall of Fame was announced. His formal induction took place in ceremonies on August 7, 2015, in Saratoga Springs, NY.

Leatherbury died at home in Mitchellville, Maryland, on February 10, 2026, at the age of 92.

== Sources ==
- 2005 Washington Post article on King T. Leatherbury
- 2003 Baltimore Sun newspaper article profile and interview with King T. Leatherbury titled Leatherbury: A breed apart
