= Jeremy Rose (jockey) =

American Thoroughbred racehorse jockey (born 1979)

Personal information
- Born: April 1, 1979 (age 47) Bellefonte, Pennsylvania, U.S.
- Occupation: Jockey

Horse racing career
- Sport: Horse racing
- Career wins: 1700+ (ongoing)

Major racing wins
- Maryland Million Classic (2001, 2002); West Virginia Governor's Stakes (2002); Miracle Wood Stakes (2003); Arkansas Derby (2005); Forward Gal Stakes (2006); Endine Stakes (2007); Grey Stakes (2007); Modesty Handicap (2007); Kennedy Road Stakes (2007); All Along Stakes (2008); Arlington Matron Handicap (2008); Highlander Stakes (2009); Remington Springboard Mile Stakes (2009); Laurel Dash Stakes (2011); Pennsylvania Governor's Cup Stakes (2011) American Classic Race wins: Preakness Stakes (2005); Belmont Stakes (2005)

Racing awards
- U.S. Champion Apprentice Jockey (2001); Best Jockey ESPY Award (2005)

Significant horses
- Afleet Alex, Big Brown, Icabad Crane

Jeremy Rose (born April 1, 1979 in Bellefonte, Pennsylvania) is an American Thoroughbred racehorse jockey. He began his career as a professional rider at Delaware Park in Wilmington, Delaware and in 2001 was his breakout year and he was voted the United States' Eclipse Award for Outstanding Apprentice Jockey.

In 2005, Rose guided Afleet Alex, to victory in two American Classic Races, the Preakness and Belmont Stakes. His performances that year earned him the ESPY Award as the top American jockey of 2005. He earned his 1000th career victory at Delaware Park on July 3, 2005.

In 2008, Rose was suspended for six months by the Delaware Thoroughbred Racing Commission for whipping Appeal to the City in the head during a June 23 race at Delaware Park. Rose, the horse's trainer and its owner, have asserted it was an accident and the suspension is under appeal.

Jeremy Rose currently resides in Elkton, Maryland.

== Early life ==
Rose was a top wrestler at Bellefonte Area High School.

== Year-end charts ==
Chart (2001–present)	Peak position
National Earnings List for Jockeys 2001	30
National Earnings List for Jockeys 2002	24
National Earnings List for Jockeys 2003	50
National Earnings List for Jockeys 2004	43
National Earnings List for Jockeys 2005	23
National Earnings List for Jockeys 2006	28
National Earnings List for Jockeys 2007	19
National Earnings List for Jockeys 2008	39
National Earnings List for Jockeys 2009	28
National Earnings List for Jockeys 2010	37
National Earnings List for Jockeys 2011	64
