= Laurel Park (race track) =

American thoroughbred racetrack near Laurel, Maryland

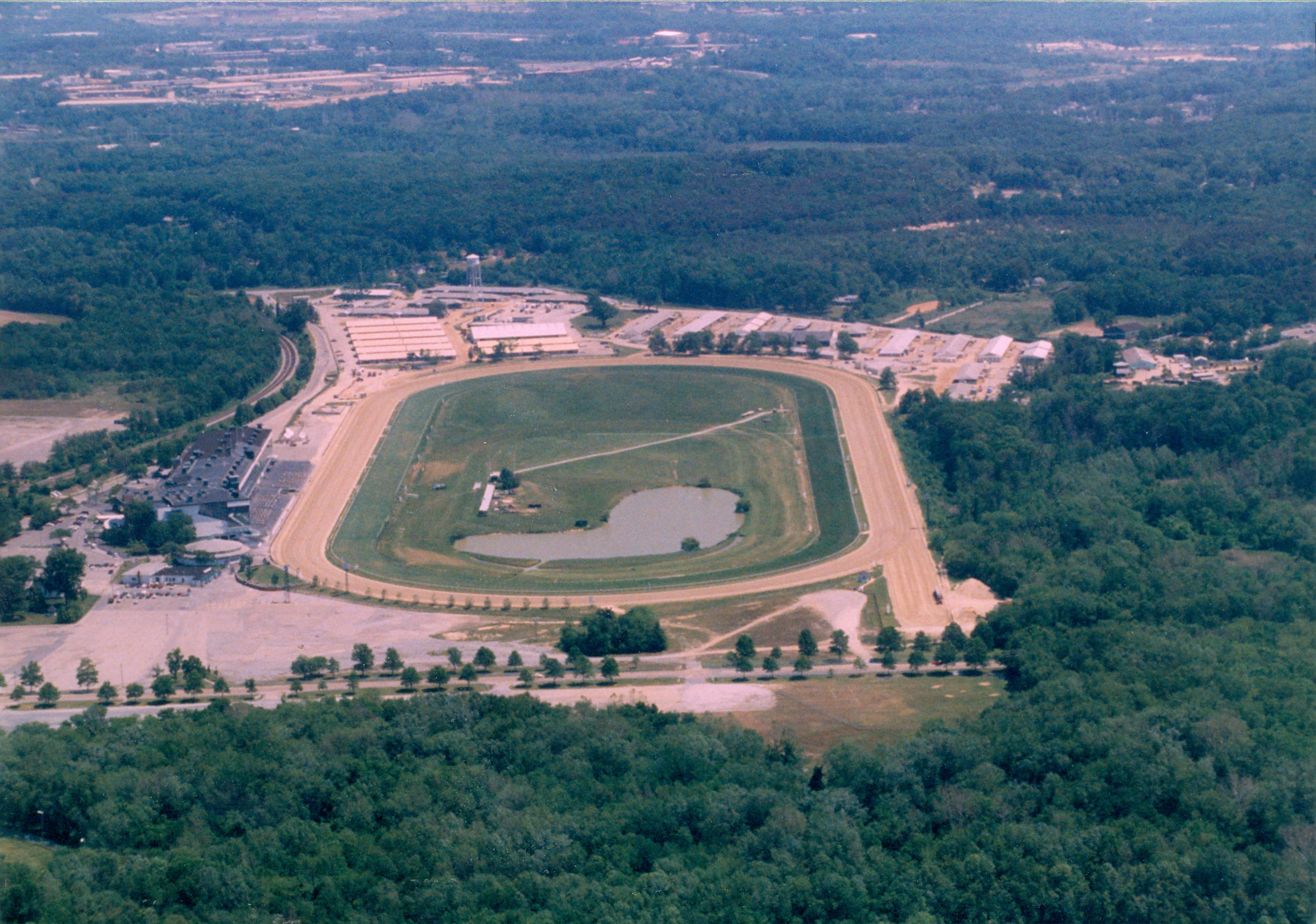
- Aerial view from southwest in 1998
- Interactive map of Laurel Park
- Location: Maryland City Community, at Route 198 & Racetrack Road, Laurel, Maryland, U.S.
- Coordinates: 39°06′14″N 76°49′51″W
- Operated by: The Maryland Jockey Club, Inc.
- Date opened: October 2, 1911; 114 years ago
- Course type: Flat; 1.125 miles (1.81 km)
- Notable races: Frank J. De Francis Memorial Dash Stakes; Barbara Fritchie Stakes (gr.3); Baltimore Washington International Turf Cup (gr.3); General George Stakes (gr.3); Maryland Million Classic
- Live racing handle: ▲$627.3 million (2017)
- Attendance: ▲671,852 (2014)

Laurel Park, formerly Laurel Race Course, is a thoroughbred racetrack in the eastern United States, located just outside Laurel, Maryland. Opened in 1911 and midway between Baltimore and Washington, D.C., the track is nine furlongs (1.125 miles (1.81 km)) in circumference; its name was "Laurel Race Course" for several decades until returning to the "Laurel Park" designation in 1994.

In April 2024, the Maryland General Assembly approved a bill to consolidate thoroughbred racing in Maryland to Pimlico Race Course in Baltimore. Laurel Park hosted the 2026 Preakness Stakes; it is to close for live racing once renovations at Pimlico are finished and be converted into a year-round training facility.

== History ==
Laurel Park Racecourse opened October 2, 1911, under the direction of the Laurel Four County Fair. In 1914, two New York businessmen and prominent horsemen, Philip J. Dwyer and James Butler, purchased the track and appointed Matt Winn as the general manager. In 1918 the field was used by Army Engineers as a training camp before deployment to France.

In 1946, a stable fire broke out; 60 horses were saved. In 1947, the Maryland Jockey Club, which owned Timonium and Pimlico, purchased Laurel Park from the Butler estate. The club aimed to shift the Pimlico meeting to Laurel, but this was rejected by the Maryland General Assembly.

In 1950, the club sold the track to Morris Schapiro, who appointed his youngest son, John D. Schapiro, as track president. Schapiro renamed the track Laurel Race Course and introduced the Washington, D.C., International: 1 1/2 miles on the turf. In 1953, Laurel opened a new clubhouse and turf club. In 1954, 14 horses were saved from another stable fire. In 1957, the grandstand was remodeled. In an effort to improve conditions for the International, Laurel lengthened its turf course from seven furlongs to one mile in 1959; simultaneously, the main track was extended from one mile to one mile and one-eighth.

In 1964, arson at the stable killed 34 horses. In 1965, the trotting track was covered with an artificial 3M "Tartan Turf". Laurel remodeled its clubhouse and grandstand to accommodate winter racing in 1966, enclosing the track's seating area with 30,000 square feet of half-inch-thick glass. In 1967, a fire in two stables was mitigated by new sprinklers. When Laurel was awarded the summer racing dates in 1982, the track installed an air-conditioning system in the grandstand and clubhouse.

In 1984, the 34-year Schapiro era ended with the sale of the track. In December 1984, Frank J. De Francis, governor Harry Hughes's selection for Economic Development secretary, and his partners, Robert and John "Tommy" Manfuso, purchased the racetrack from Schapiro before racetrack legislation would pose a conflict of interest. In 1985, a "Sports Palace" was added. In August 1989, Frank De Francis died and his son, Joe De Francis, then served as president of Laurel and Pimlico. In 1994 the track's name returned to "Laurel Park". Improvement were made to the main entrance, grandstand interior, and backstretch barns.

In 1994, a proposal was floated to redevelop land occupied by Laurel Park and its adjacent properties in order to move the Washington Redskins Stadium at the crossroads of Whiskey Bottom Road and Brock Bridge Road. Citizens and clergy launched an opposition campaign that killed the proposal, in part for lack of parking.

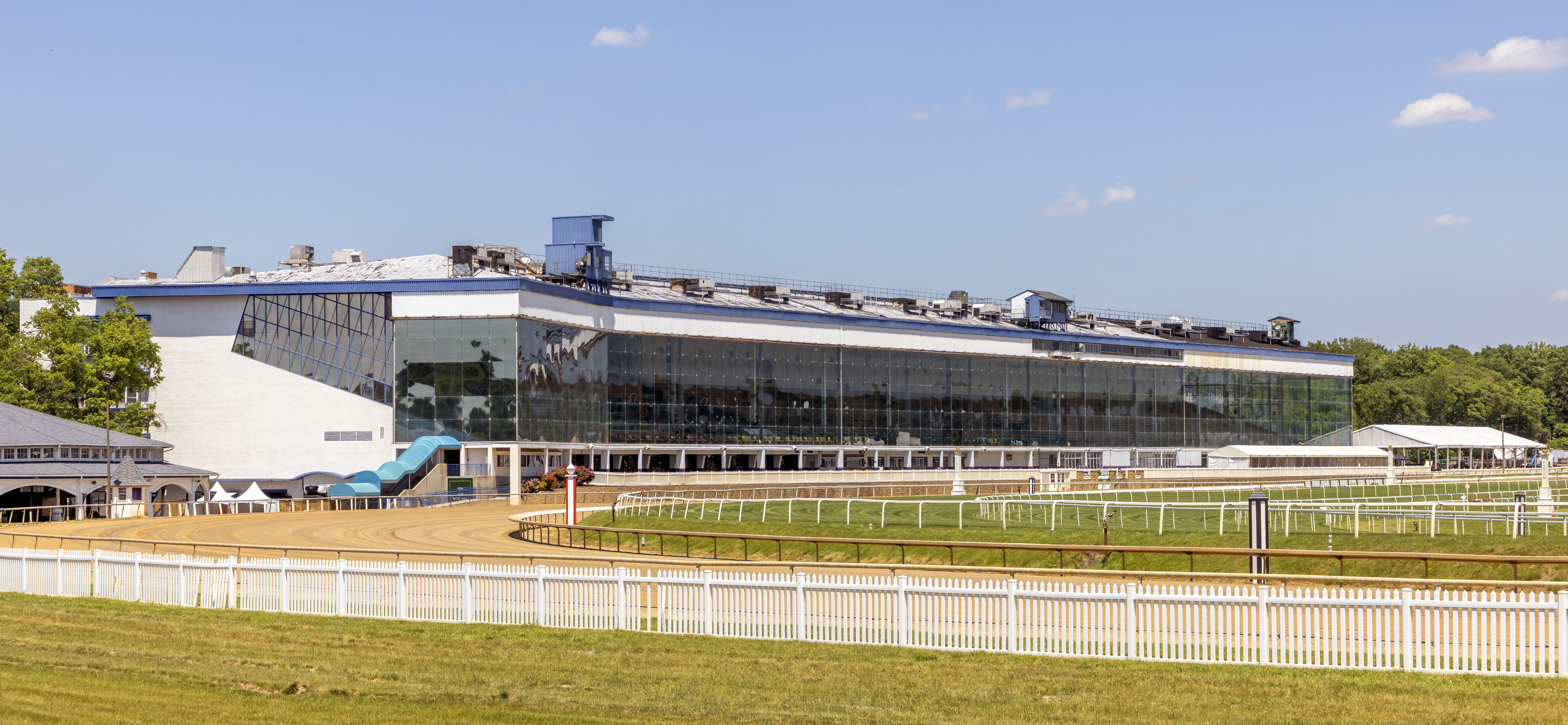
Laurel Park track and grandstands in 2026, just after the Preakness race

In 1999 the MJC broke ground on a new $1.85 million backstretch housing project, Laurel Commons, in cooperation with Laurel Quality of Life, Inc., the Enterprise Foundation, Inc. and the Ryan Family Foundation, Inc. In addition, Laurel Park, as part of a $16 million multi-year renovation plan, opened four premier Clubhouse areas: "Tycoons," an upscale cigar and brandy bar with an excellent television presentation of racing and other sporting events; "Sunny Jim's," a simulcast theater with individual carrels, and food & beverage service; "Clocker's Corner," a casual simulcast theater and cafe in a convenient track-side location and the "Kelso Club," a premier accommodation for VIP customers with concierge service. Magna Entertainment Corp. purchased the track on July 15, 2002, and announced an alliance with The Maryland Jockey Club designed to raise the level of Maryland thoroughbred racing to new heights. Another renovation of Laurel Park's track and facility in 2004 to early January 2005 widened both racing surfaces.

After Magna's bankruptcy in 2009, Penn National Gaming and MI Developments acquired joint ownership of the Maryland Jockey Club in 2010 for operation of Laurel Park. The Stronach Group bought out Penn National's minority ownership interest in the Maryland Jockey Club in June 2011. In May 2011, Frank Stronach gave up leadership of MI Development in exchange for Magna's former gaming assets, giving him control over Laurel Park.

In 2013, after a failed attempt to introduce slot machine gambling, Laurel Park owners Stronach Group announced plans to use the Maryland Racetrack Facility Redevelopment Account to fund year-round racing, facility improvements and a tunnel under the adjacent B&O railroad tracks, connecting to a 1,000-unit transit-oriented development called Laurel Park Station on the Howard County portion of the Racetrack property. In 2018, the track began using a GPS-based timing system.

In October 2019, as part of an agreement between The Stronach Group and the city of Baltimore to keep the Preakness Stakes at Pimlico Race Course, plans were announced for upgrades to Laurel Park. Under the proposal, The Stronach Group would donate Pimilco and Laurel Park to new government entities that would oversee the properties, with Stronach licensed to conduct the race meets. Laurel's grandstand would be demolished and replaced, and new dirt, synthetic, and grass surfaces for racing would be installed. New housing for backstretch workers and new barns would also be constructed. The plans would have to be approved by the Maryland state legislature when it convened in 2020, as existing state laws would have to be modified in order for the proposal to be realized.

In April 2021, problems with Laurel's main track surface forced spring racing dates to be moved to Pimlico.

=== 2026 Preakness and training center conversion ===
In January 2024, it was announced that major renovations would take place at Pimlico Race Course, resulting in one or two runnings of the Preakness Stakes moving to Laurel. A bill introduced in the Maryland General Assembly in March 2024 provided for the consolidation of thoroughbred racing in the state to Pimlico, with the 2026 Preakness run at Laurel during the Pimlico redevelopment. The bill passed in April 2024 after amendment, and was expected to be signed into law by Governor Wes Moore. Laurel was expected to close permanently for racing, and the land possibly used for redevelopment, once renovations at Pimlico were completed.

On January 1, 2025, management of Laurel Park changed from the former Maryland Jockey Club (part of the for-profit Stronach Group) to the new Maryland Jockey Club, which operates as a non-profit entity of the state-run Maryland Thoroughbred Racetrack Operating Authority. The Stronach Group continues to own the Laurel Park property. The operating authority was dissolved on June 30, 2025, per a budget provision, and its duties passed to the Maryland Stadium Authority. In January 2026, Maryland officials announced that they had reached an agreement to purchase Laurel Park from the Stronach Group for $50 million, with plans to convert it into a horse training center to complement the Pimlico facility. The purchase cleared a regulatory hurdle in April 2026 when the board of the Maryland Stadium Authority approved the purchase, with the cost revised to $48.5 million.

=== Highlights of the first 100 years ===
- Triple Crown winners Sir Barton, War Admiral, Whirlaway, Secretariat and Affirmed won races at Laurel Park during their Hall of Fame careers.
- Classic winners Omar Khayyam (1917 Kentucky Derby), Hourless (1917 Belmont Stakes), Exterminator (1918 Kentucky Derby), High Echelon (1970 Belmont), Riva Ridge (1972 Derby & Belmont), Spectacular Bid (1979 Derby & Preakness Stakes), Bet Twice (1987 Belmont), Go and Go (1990 Belmont) and Barbaro (2006 Derby) also competed at the central Maryland track.
- Seabiscuit prepped at Laurel Park for his famous match race with War Admiral. On October 15, 1938, two weeks before the Pimlico Special, Seabiscuit finished second in the Laurel Stakes, a race he had won the previous year.
- Kelso, the only five-time Horse of the Year, won the 1964 Washington D.C. International in his fourth attempt, beating rival Gun Bow. Kelso finished second in his three previous tries in the International, all by less than a length.
- Sandy Hawley became the first rider in history with 500 victories in a single-season when he guided Charlie Jr. to victory at Laurel Park on December 15, 1973. Hawley finished the year with 515 victories.
- Chris McCarron surpassed Hawley with his 516th winner on December 17, 1974, aboard Oh My Love at Laurel Park. He completed the year with 546 victories.
- Kent Desormeaux broke McCarron's mark when he rode his 547th winner for the year, aboard Gilten, at Laurel Park on November 30, 1989. Desormeaux finished the year with 598 victories, a record that still stands.
- The Maryland Million, an innovative program devised by broadcaster Jim McKay to promote the Maryland breeding industry, debuted at Laurel Park in 1986. The 26th running of the event took place at Laurel on October 1, 2011.
- Edgar Prado became the fourth jockey to win 500 races in a single-season when he reached the wire first aboard Hardball on November 30, 1997, at Laurel Park. Prado ended the year with 536 victories.
- Mario Pino became the 15th rider in North America to reach 6,000 career wins when he guided Pass Play to victory at Laurel Park on November 7, 2007.
- Rapid Redux joined Zenyatta and Peppers Pride as the only horses in North American thoroughbred history to win 19 consecutive races in a row after he out stepped four starter allowance runners at Laurel Park on October 27, 2011.

== Racing ==
=== Stakes events ===
Races at Laurel Park, listed by grade and sorted by inaugural year. The following Graded events were held at Laurel Park in 2019.

Grade 3 Stakes Races:

- Barbara Fritchie Stakes (1952) Winter
- Baltimore Washington International Turf Cup (1952) Autumn
- General George Stakes (1973) Winter

State-bred Showcase Stakes Races:

- Maryland Million Classic (1986) Autumn
- Maryland Million Ladies (1986) Autumn
- Maryland Million Turf (1986) Autumn
- Maryland Million Sprint Handicap (1986) Autumn
- Maryland Million Distaff Handicap (1986) Autumn
- Maryland Million Nursery (1986) Autumn
- Maryland Million Lassie (1986) Autumn
- Maryland Million Oaks (1986) Autumn
- Maryland Million Turf Sprint Handicap (2004) Autumn

Listed Stakes Races:
Ungraded stakes races run at Laurel Park, listed by inaugural year:

- Laurel Futurity (1921) Autumn
- Jennings Handicap (1923) Winter
- Selima Stakes (1926) Autumn
- Nellie Morse Stakes (1941) Winter
- Japan Turf Cup Stakes (1952) Autumn
- Laurel Dash Stakes (1988) Autumn
- John B. Campbell Handicap (1954) Winter
- Native Dancer Stakes (1966) Winter
- Conniver Stakes (1969) Spring
- All Brandy Stakes (1970) Autumn
- Geisha Stakes (1973) Winter
- Anne Arundel County Stakes (1974) Autumn
- What A Summer Stakes (1978) Winter
- Twixt Stakes (1978) Autumn
- Caesar's Wish Stakes (1978) Spring
- Find Stakes (1978) Autumn
- Federico Tesio Stakes (1981) Spring
- Pearl Necklace Stakes (1981) Summer
- All Along Stakes (1981) Autumn
- Maryland Juvenile Championship (1982) Autumn
- Maryland Racing Media Stakes (1982) Winter
- Mister Diz Stakes (1983) Summer
- Jameela Stakes (1983) Summer
- Dahlia Stakes at Laurel Park (1985) Spring
- Deputed Testamony Stakes (1986) Spring
- Safely Kept Stakes (1986) Autumn
- Maryland Juvenile Filly Championship (1986) Autumn
- Harrison E. Johnson Memorial Stakes (1986) Winter
- Marshua Stakes (1987) Winter
- Primonetta Stakes (1988) Spring
- Private Terms Stakes (1990) Spring
- Frank J. DeFrancis Memorial Dash Stakes (1990) Summer
- Fire Plug Stakes (1993) Winter
- Wide Country Stakes (1994) Winter
- Miracle Wood Stakes (1995) Winter
- Commonwealth Oaks (2004) Summer
- Willa On the Move Stakes (2012) Winter

Discontinued Stakes Races:

- Annapolis Stakes (1972–2000)
- Belair Stakes (19??–2001)
- Bowie Stakes (1962–2000)
- Chesapeake Stakes (1912–2000)
- Dancing Count Stakes (1985–2012) Winter
- Horatius Stakes (1994–2008) Winter
- Humphrey S. Finney Stakes (1986–2009)
- Squan Song Stakes (1988–2011) Autumn

== Music festivals ==
During the late 1960s Laurel Race Course hosted a number of jazz festivals, as well as a pop festival on the eve of Woodstock. The 1967 festival, titled "Jazz Runs at Laurel," also known as the First Annual Washington/Baltimore Jazz Festival, featured Miles Davis, the Jimmy Smith Trio, Dizzy Gillespie, and Woody Herman and his Big Band on the first night, followed by Art Blakey, Nina Simone, Horace Silver, Dave Brubeck, and the Thad Jones/Mel Lewis Orchestra. The final night featured Thelonious Monk, Herbie Mann, the Modern Jazz Quartet, and Clark Terry.

The following year "Operation Jazz 1968" presented return performances by Miles Davis, Dizzy Gillespie, Horace Silver, Herbie Mann, Thelonious Monk, Woody Herman, Jimmy Smith, and Mel Lewis-Thad Jones, as well as Sonny Rollins, the Count Basie Big Band, Joe Williams, Coleman Hawkins, Roy Eldridge, Freddie Hubbard, Wes Montgomery, Cannonball Adderley, Gary Burton, Miriam Makeba, Art Farmer-Jimmy Heath Quintet, Arthur Prysock, the 5th Dimension, and Rufus Harley.

The 1969 Laurel Jazz Fest starred Count Basie and His Orchestra, Eddie Harris, Herbie Mann, Mongo Santamaría, Nancy Wilson, the Thad Jones/Mel Lewis Orchestra, Buddy Rich, Cannonball Adderley, Dizzy Gillespie, Horace Silver, Roberta Flack, Sam & Dave, and James Brown.

The 1969 Laurel Pop Festival featured some of the biggest names in rock and roll of the time: Led Zeppelin, Sly & the Family Stone, Frank Zappa, Jeff Beck, Rod Stewart, and others. The second night of the pop festival was delayed because of rain, which led some fans to build a bonfire out of wooden folding chairs to keep warm. As the festival dragged on behind schedule the police finally shut down the festival around 2:00 a.m. during Sly & the Family Stone's set. Those problems, which some media reported as a "riot," meant the end of the jazz and pop festivals, even though the pop festival had turned a profit for the promoters.

== Public transit ==
The racecourse can be accessed via MARC Train at the Laurel Racetrack station, and RTA Buses 409 and 502.
