= Pleasantly Perfect =

American-bred Thoroughbred racehorse

- Sire: Pleasant Colony
- Grandsire: His Majesty
- Dam: Regal State
- Damsire: Affirmed
- Sex: Stallion
- Foaled: April 2, 1998
- Died: June 3, 2020 (in Turkey)
- Country: United States
- Colour: Bay
- Breeder: Clovelly Farms
- Owner: Diamond A Racing Corps
- Trainer: Richard Mandella
- Record: 18: 9-3-2
- Earnings: $7,789,880

Major wins
- Goodwood Breeders' Cup Handicap (2002 & 2003); Breeders' Cup Classic (2003); San Antonio Handicap (2004); Pacific Classic Stakes (2004); Dubai World Cup (2004)
- Last updated on February 17, 2007

Pleasantly Perfect (April 2, 1998 – June 3, 2020) was an American Thoroughbred racehorse who won the 2003 Breeder's Cup Classic, and 2004 Dubai World Cup. At the time of his retirement, he was the fourth-richest American horse in career earnings.

== Background ==
Pleasantly Perfect was sired by Pleasant Colony, winner of the 1981 Kentucky Derby and Preakness Stakes. His dam Regal State, who was sired by the 1978 Triple Crown winner Affirmed, won the 1985 Group One Prix Morny in France.

In September 1999, Pleasantly Perfect was purchased by Diamond A Racing at the Keeneland Yearling Sale for $725,000 from Clovelly Farms.

== Racing career ==
=== 2001 ===
Pleasantly Perfect made his debut on May 31, at Hollywood Park, but he would not finish the race. It would be his only start as a 3 year old.

=== 2002 ===
Pleasantly Perfect returned to make a few starts. On August 25, he made his stakes debut with a fourth-place finish in the Pacific Classic Stakes. On October 6, he won the Goodwood Breeders' Cup Handicap at Santa Anita.

=== 2003 ===
Pleasantly Perfect started the year by coming third in the San Antonio Stakes on February 2 and fourth in the Santa Anita Handicap on March 1.

At the end of the year, Pleasantly Perfect won the 6 million dollar Breeders' Cup Classic on October 25.

=== 2004 ===
Pleasantly Perfect then won another big race, the $12,000,000 Dubai World Cup on March 27. He became the second horse to win both the Breeder's Cup Classic and Dubai World Cup, behind Cigar.

He then came second in the San Diego Handicap on August 1, before winning the Pacific Classic Stakes on August 22.

In his last race he finished third behind Ghostzapper and Roses in May in the 2004 Breeders' Cup Classic on October 30.

=== Results ===
Date	Race	Track	Finish
3 year old
5/31/2001	Maiden Special Weight	Hollywood Park	DNF
4 year old
1/27/2002	Maiden Special Weight	Santa Anita	2nd
2/13/2002	Maiden Special Weight	Santa Anita	4th
2/27/2002	Maiden Special Weight	Santa Anita	1st
4/6/2002	Allowance Optional Claiming	Santa Anita	2nd
6/20/2002	Allowance	Hollywood Park	1st
8/4/2002	Allowance Optional Claiming	Del Mar	1st
8/25/2002	Pacific Classic Stakes	Del Mar	4th
10/6/2002	Goodwood Breeders' Cup Handicap	Santa Anita	1st
5 year old
2/2/2003	San Antonio Handicap	Santa Anita	3rd
3/1/2003	Santa Anita Handicap	Santa Anita	4th
10/4/2003	Goodwood Breeders' Cup Handicap	Santa Anita	1st
10/25/2003	Breeders' Cup Classic	Santa Anita	1st
6 year old
1/31/2004	San Antonio Handicap	Santa Anita	1st
3/27/2004	Emirates Airline Dubai World Cup	Nad Al Sheba	1st
8/1/2004	San Diego Handicap	Del Mar	2nd
8/22/2004	Pacific Classic Stakes	Del Mar	1st
10/30/2004	Breeders' Cup Classic	Lone Star Park	3rd

== Stud record ==
Pleasantly Perfect entered stud in 2005 at Lane's End Farm in Versailles, Kentucky with a stud fee of $70,000. His first offspring to race was Rapid Redux, who won a record 22 straight races and was the winner of the Eclipse Special Award for 2011.

By 2011, his stud fee dropped down to $7,500. That year he was sold to Fleetwood Bloodstock at the Keeneland November Breeding Stock Sale for $32,000. In 2014, Pleasantly Perfect was exported to Turkey.

On June 3, 2020, Pleasantly Perfect died at the age of 22 from a brief illness. His most successful son, Whitmore, won the Breeders' Cup Sprint, later that November.

== Pedigree ==
Pedigree of Pleasantly Perfect (1998-2020)
Sire Pleasant Colony 1978	His Majesty 1968	Ribot	Tenerani
Sire Pleasant Colony 1978	His Majesty 1968	Ribot	Romanella
Sire Pleasant Colony 1978	His Majesty 1968	Flower Bowl	Alibhai
Sire Pleasant Colony 1978	His Majesty 1968	Flower Bowl	Flower Bed
Sire Pleasant Colony 1978	Sun Colony 1968	Sunrise Flight	Double Jay
Sire Pleasant Colony 1978	Sun Colony 1968	Sunrise Flight	Misty Morn
Sire Pleasant Colony 1978	Sun Colony 1968	Colonia	Cockrullah
Sire Pleasant Colony 1978	Sun Colony 1968	Colonia	Nalga
Dam Regal State 1983	Affirmed 1975	Exclusive Native	Raise a Native
Dam Regal State 1983	Affirmed 1975	Exclusive Native	Exclusive
Dam Regal State 1983	Affirmed 1975	Won't Tell You	Crafty Admiral
Dam Regal State 1983	Affirmed 1975	Won't Tell You	Scarlet Ribbon
Dam Regal State 1983	La Trinite 1976	Lyphard	Northern Dancer
Dam Regal State 1983	La Trinite 1976	Lyphard	Goofed
Dam Regal State 1983	La Trinite 1976	Promessa	Darius
Dam Regal State 1983	La Trinite 1976	Promessa	Peseta
