= Suwannee River Stakes top three finishers =

This is a listing of the horses that finished in either first, second, or third place and the number of starters in the Suwannee River Stakes, an American Grade 3 race for Open to fillies and mares four-year-olds and up, at 1-1/8 miles (9 furlongs)on synthetic surface held at Gulfstream Park in Hallandale Beach, Florida. (List 1973–present)

Year	Winner	Second	Third	Starters
2013	Channel Lady	Abaco	Inglorious	7
2012	Snow Top Mountain	Hit It Rich	Gold d'Oro	8
2011	Cherokee Queen	Never Retreat	Persuading	10
2010	Tottie	Cable	In My Glory	9
2009	Lady Carlock	Mushka	Drop a line	8
2008	La Dolce Vita	J'ray	Waquoit's Love	11
2007	Naissance Royal	J'ray	Porta classica	10
2006	Eyes on Eddy	Tattinger Rose	Marchonin	5
2005	Snowdrops	Angela's Love	High Court	10
2004	Wishful Splendor	May Gator	Mymich	5
2003	Amonita	What a Price	Calista	9
2002	Snow Dance	Step With Style	Windsong	6
2001	Snook Express	Gaviola	Windsong	8
2000	Pico Teneriffe	Dominique's Joy	Crystal Symphony	8
1999	Winfama	Circus Charmer	Colcon	10
1998	Seebe	Colcon	Parade Queen	10
1997	Golden Pond	Rumpipumpy	Elusive	11
1996	Class Kris	Apolda	Majestic Dy	5
1995	Cox Orange	Irving's Girl	Alice Springs	7
1994	Marshuas River	Sheila's Revenge	Icy Warning	12
1993	Via Borghese	Marshuas River	Blue Daisy	14
1992	Julie La Rousse	Christiecat	Grab the Green	11
1991	Vigorous Lady	Yen for Gold	Premier Question	5
1990	Princess Mora	Fieldy	Northling	12
1989 #	Love You by Heart	Native Mommy	Aquaba	10
1989 #	Fieldy	Summer Secretary	Chapel of Dreams	9
1988 #	Go Honey Go	Princely Proof	Fieldy	11
1988 #	Anka Germania	Sum	Fama	12
1987 #	Fieldy dh	Fama dh	Navarchus	8
1987 #	Singular Bequest	Cadabra Abra	Duckweed	7
1986 #	Chesire Kitten	Chaldea	Four Flings	10
1986 #	Videogenic	Contredance	Vebality	9
1985 #	Early Lunch	Eva G.	Maidenhead	12
1985 #	Sherizar	Madam Flutterby	Melanie Frances	12
1985 #	Burst of Colors	Queen of Song	Silver In Flight	12
1984	Sulemeif	Jubilous	Melanie Frances	13
1983 #	Norsan	Dana Calqui	Colatine	12
1983 #	Syrianna	Meringue Pie	Plenty O'Toole	8
1983 #	Promising Native	Avowal	Our Darling	7
1982 #	Pine Flower	Sweetest Chant	Fair Davina	9
1982 #	Teacher's Pet	Shark Song	Blush	9
1981 #	Honey Fox	Racquette	Pompoes	9
1981 #	Exactly So	Draw In	Champagne Ginny	9
1980 #	Ouro Verde	No Disgrace	Anna Yrrah D.	10
1980 #	Just A Game	La Soufriere	La Voyageuse	10
1979 #	Navajo Princess	La Soufriere	Unreality	13
1979 #	Calderina	Terpsichorist	She Can Dance	11
1978	Len's Determined	What A Summer	Late Bloomer	9
1977	Bronze Point	Funny Peculiar	Collegiate	7
1976	Jabot	Redundancy	Deesse Du Val	14
1975	Deesse Du Val	North of Venus	Lorraine Edna	11
1974	Dove Creek Lady	North Broadway	North of Venus	13
1973	Ziba Blue	Cathy Baby	Barely Even	13

A # designates that the race was run in more than one division that year.
