= What A Summer Stakes top three finishers =

This is a listing of the horses that finished in either first, second, or third place and the number of starters in the What A Summer Stakes (1978–2010), an American Thoroughbred Stakes race for fillies and mares four years-old and up at six furlongs run on dirt at Laurel Park Racecourse in Laurel, Maryland.

Year	Winner	Second	Third	Starters
2018	Ms Locust Point	Tazkeya	My Magician	7
2017	Sweet On Smokey	Disco Chick	Lovable Lady	5
2016	Sweet On Smokey	Raging Smoke	E. Dubai's Humor	9
2015	Lady Sabelia	She's Ordained	Sounds of the City	8
2014	Winning Image	She's Ordained	Vicki's Dancer	8
2013	Bold Affair	Dance to Bristol	Enchante	8
2012	No races	No races	No races	0
2011	Aspenglow	Five Diamonds	Sweet Goodbye	7
2010	Sweet Goodbye	Royale Michele	Cuvee Uncorked	10
2009	Access Fee	All Giving	Now It Begins	11
2008	Silmaril	All Giving	La Chica Rica	8
2007	Silmaril	Scheing E Jet	La Chica Rica	7
2006	Flame of Love	Spirited Game	See Alice	10
2005	Sensibly Chic	Wallop	Bronze Abe	9
2004	Bronze Abe	Bamba	Gazillion	7
2003	Xtra Heat	Gazillion	Bernie's Gold	6
2002	Outstanding Info	Bedside Manner	Prized Stamp	n/a
2001	Doc Calls Her Kate	Ivy's Jewel	It's a True Ring	n/a
1993–2000	No races	No races	No races	0
1992	Carnirainbow	Bocamis	Nostarch	n/a
1991	Set to Fly	Gala Gold Digger	Good Looking Terri	n/a
1990	Gala Goldilocks	Nicki	Indian Anthem	n/a
1989	Valay Maid	Lucky Lady Lauren	She's a Champ	n/a
1988	Hard Headed Woman	Bearing Testamony	Don't Be Foolish	n/a
1987	Sham Say	Gina's Double	Gilded Production	n/a
1986	Wainee Church	Safe At the Plate	Precious Tiffini	n/a
1985	Gala de Oro	Timelessleigh	Quadorian	n/a
1984	Artful Girl	Via Venito	Well Founded	n/a
1983	Sea Siren	Dancing Dot	Scherzo's Last	n/a
1982	Kattegat's Pride	Lady of Cornwall	Jove's Lady	n/a
1981	Privacy	Lava Bobbin	Contrary Rose	n/a
1980	Denim Gal	Rolling Mill	Jameela	n/a
1979	Silver Ice	Bare Facts	Paddock Calls	n/a
1978	Debby's Turn	Moonlight Jig	Silver Ice	n/a
