= Maryland Million Oaks top three finishers =

This is a listing of the horses that finished in either first, second, or third place and the number of starters in the Maryland Million Oaks, an American state-bred stakes race for three-year-old fillies at one mile (8 furlongs) on the dirt held at Laurel Park Racecourse in Laurel, Maryland. (List 1986-present)

Year	Winner	Second	Third	Starters
2020	No Race	No Race	No race	0
2019	No Race	No Race	No race	0
2018	No Race	No Race	No race	0
2017	No Race	No Race	No race	0
2016	No Race	No Race	No race	0
2015	No Race	No Race	No race	0
2014	No Race	No Race	No race	0
2013	No Race	No Race	No race	0
2012	Jazzy Idea	Spring Dance	Ok Listen Up	8
2011	Brushed by Love	Blushing B J	Love's Reason	6
2010	Baltimore Belle	Lil Kiara	Kincoralyn	n/a
2009	Love that Dance	Blind Date	Love's Blush	n/a
2008	Sweet Goodbye	Saxet Heights	Love for Not	n/a
2007	Moon Catcher	Paying Off	Loveyasister	n/a
2006	Smart and Fancy	For Kisses	Crown You	n/a
2005	Sticky	Lexi Star	Unbridled Grace	n/a
2004	Silmaril	Blind Canyon	Richetta	n/a
2003	River Cruise	Valley of the Gods	Coquettish	n/a
2002	Undercover	Tamayo	Carnie's Dancer	n/a
2001	Along Came Mary	Magic Stream	Guillotine	n/a
2000	Gin Talking	Brig	Steppedoutofadream	n/a
1999	Saratoga Friends	Perfect Challenge	Silent Valay	n/a
1998	Marigold Princess	Primercy	Ragtime Doll	n/a
1997	Proud Run	Buckles and kinks	G. O'Keefe	n/a
1996	The Ruler's Sister	Hey Let's Dance	True Mystery	n/a
1995	Urbane	Quite Proper	Fighting Countess	n/a
1994	Churchbell Chimes	Woo and Me	Waqueen	n/a
1993	Champion Jay	Key to the Hill	Vallation	n/a
1992	Deputation	Singing Ring	Lady Sage	n/a
1991	Richard's Lass	Long Walk	Ritchie Tail	n/a
1990	McKilts	Lucky Lady Lauren	Valay Maid	n/a
1989	Beware of the Cat	Under Oath	Bullet Assault	n/a
1988	Oh My Pride	Eesee's Taw	Lanzada	n/a
1987	Angelina County	Too Smart Too Late	Praise Her	n/a
1986	Smart 'n Quick	Miss Rudy T.	My Mafalda	n/a

== See also ==
- Maryland Million Oaks
- Maryland Million Day
- Laurel Park Racecourse
