= Conniver Stakes top three finishers =

This is a listing of the horses that finished in either first, second, or third place and the number of starters in the Conniver Stakes (1969-present), an American Thoroughbred Stakes race for fillies and mares three years-old and up at 7 furlongs run on dirt at Laurel Park Racecourse in Laurel, Maryland.

Year	Winner	Second	Third	Starters
2022				
2021	Kiss the Girl	Lookin Dynamic	Whispering Pines	8
2020	No Race	No Race	No Race	-
2019	Anna's Bandit	S W Briar Rose	Enchanted Ghost	10
2018	Anna's Bandit	My Magician	She Rolls	8
2017	Next Best Thing	If I Was a Boy	Bawlmer Hon	7
2016	Candida H.	Brenda's Way	Miss Bullistic	9
2015	Eddy Gourmet	Printasticat	If Not For Her	7
2014	More Than a Cruise	Celtic Katie	Brenda's Way	9
2013	Bold Affair	More Than a Cruise	Access to Charlie	8
2012	Bold Affair	Baltimore Belle	Music Please	10
2011	Fascinatin' Rhythm	Sweet Goodbye	Miss Charm City	6
2010	Sweet Goodbye	Call of a Lion	All Giving	7
2009	Fancy Diamond	All Giving	Puskita	9
2008	All Giving	La Chica Rica	For Kisses	n/a
2007	Silmaril	La Chica Rica	Scheing E Jet	n/a
2006	Spirited Game	Plata	Romenade Girl	n/a
2005	Chrusciki	Glory of Love	Richetta	n/a
2004	Bronze Abe	Search for a Cure	In Love	n/a
2003	Gazillion	Broad Picture	Darnestown	n/a
2002	Winter Leaf	Your Out	Case of the Blues	n/a
2001	A Lot of Mary	Case of the Blues	Silent Valay	n/a
2000	Shashobegon	Vanna Go	Northern Mist	n/a
1999	Halo's Security	Maragold Princess	Proud Run	n/a
1998	Brush Over	Weather Vane	Truth and Nobility	n/a
1997	Secret Prospect	Hay Let's Dance	Faster and Farter	n/a
1996	Julie's Brilliance	Miss Slewpy	Dancing Lass	n/a
1995	Queen Letizia	Ask Me Out	Smart 'n Noble	n/a
1994	Fleet Broad	Buffels	Known as Nancy	n/a
1993	Silver Tango	Ritchie Trail	Singing Rain	n/a
1992	Brilliant Brass	Wood So	Wide Country	n/a
1991	Run Spot	McKilts	Double Artemis	n/a
1990	Double Artemis	Fat and Foxy	Bearing Testamony	n/a
1989	Eesee's Taw	In the Curl	Likely Passage	n/a
1988	Parade of Roses	Angelina County	Smart 'n Quick	n/a
1987	Tulindas	Stay Home	A Joyful Spray	n/a
1986	La Caleche	Country Recital	Marion's Madel	n/a
1985	La Reine Elaine	Owned by All	Kattegat's Pride	n/a
1984	Final Chapter	Sweet Slew	Sail On Indian	n/a
1983	Kattegat's Pride	Golden Wage	Jollibe	n/a
1982	Lady Dean	Contrary Rose	Zvetlana	n/a
1981	Contrary Rose	Jamila Kadir	Tote Em Up	n/a
1980	Sentencia	Silver Ice	Nobulee	n/a
1979	Silver Ice	Dancing Cobra	Jamila Kadir	n/a
1978	Luck Penny	Glad Appeal	One Night Affair	n/a
1977	Shark's Jaw	Maui Princess	Avum	n/a
1976	War Exchange	Gala Lil	Outa de Question	n/a
1975	Sarah Percy	Advising Jean	Noble Daughter	n/a
1974	Euonymous	Sarah Percy	Naleesa	n/a
1973	Alma North	Euonymous	Lady Galaxy	n/a
1972	Lead Me On	Sun Colony	Lady Galaxy	n/a
1971	Daring Step	Miss Fall River	Pete's Chick	n/a
1970	Dear to All	Cherrybird	Cottle	n/a
1969	Miss Spin	Good Game	Forest Path	n/a
