= Silmaril (disambiguation) =

The Silmarils are three brilliant jewels in J. R. R. Tolkien's fantasy fiction.

Silmaril may also refer to:

- Silmarils (company), a French computer game software company
- Silmaril (horse), an American thoroughbred mare racehorse
- The Silmarillion, a collection of J. R. R. Tolkien's mythopoeic works
