= Anne Arundel Stakes top three finishers and starters =

This is a listing of the horses that finished in either first, second, or third place and the number of starters in the Anne Arundel Stakes, an American stakes race for fillies three years-old at 1 mile (8 furlongs) on the turf held at Laurel Park Racecourse in Laurel, Maryland. (List 1974-present)

| Year | Winner | Second | Third | Starters |
|---|---|---|---|---|
| 2014 | No Race | No Race | No Race | 0 |
| 2013 | No Race | No Race | No Race | 0 |
| 2012 | No Race | No Race | No Race | 0 |
| 2011 | No Race | No Race | No Race | 0 |
| 2010 | No Race | No Race | No Race | 0 |
| 2009 | No Race | No Race | No Race | 0 |
| 2008 | Sweet Vendetta | She's All Eltish | Seattle Smooth | n/a |
| 2007 | No Race | No Race | No Race | 0 |
| 2006 | Leah's secret | Baby Bird | Les Ry Leigh | n/a |
| 2005 | Trickle of Gold | Lexi Star | Sticky | n/a |
| 2004 | Essence | Rare Gift | Family Business | n/a |
| 2003 | Smooth Maneuvers | Devotion Unbridled | Alchemist | n/a |
| 2002 | Martha's Music | Pass the Virtue | Shop Till You Drop | n/a |
| 2001 | No Race | No Race | No Race | 0 |
| 2000 | Gin Talking | Tax Affair | A. O. L. Hayes | n/a |
| 1999 | Undermine | Gold From the West | Batique | n/a |
| 1998 | Merengue | Queen of Oz | Manoa | n/a |
| 1997 | G. O'Keefe | Snit | Cotton Carnival | n/a |
| 1996 | Hay Let's Dance | Double Stake | Mesabi Maiden | n/a |
| 1995 | Blue Sky Princess | Substantial | Blonde Actress | n/a |
| 1994 | Miss Slewpy | Cherokee Wonder | Churchbell Chimes | n/a |
| 1993 | By Your Leave | Tennis Lady | Double Sixes | n/a |
| 1992 | Avian Assembly | Gammy's Alden | Singing Ring | n/a |
| 1991 | Devilish Touch | Get Lucky | Far Out Nurse | n/a |
| 1990 | McKilts | Trumpet's Blare | Secreto Glory | n/a |
| 1989 | Misty Ivor | Under Oath | Slew a Native | n/a |
| 1988 | Empress Tigere | Lost Kitty | North Watch | n/a |
| 1987 | Doubles Partner | Ruling Angel | Actic Cloud | n/a |
| 1986 # | Burt's Dream | Now Your Teapottin | Vacherie | n/a |
| 1986 # | Toes Knows | Foot Stone | Notches Trace | n/a |
| 1985 | Classy Cut | A Joyful Spray | Little Brooks Mesa | n/a |
| 1984 | Dowery | Basie | Dumdedumdedum | n/a |
| 1983 | Quixotic Lady | Bemissed | Batna | n/a |
| 1982 | Kattegat's Pride | Wedding Party | Delicate Ice | n/a |
| 1981 | Up the Flagpole | Privacy | Zvetlana | n/a |
| 1980 | Caught in Amber | Fair Hit | Running Around | n/a |
| 1979 | Jameela | Sentencia | Contrary Rose | n/a |
| 1978 | The Very One | Silver Ice | Dr. Penny Binn | n/a |
| 1977 | Worrisome Thing | Northern Sea | Lucky Penny | n/a |
| 1976 | What a Summer | Turn the Guns | Avum | n/a |
| 1975 | My Juliet | Funny Cat | Gala Lil | n/a |
| 1974 | Pinch Pie | Sailingon | Enchanted Native | n/a |

A # designates that the race was run in two divisions in 1986.
