= Violet Stakes =

- Class: Listed stakes
- Location: Monmouth Park Racetrack; Oceanport, New Jersey, United States
- Inaugurated: 1977
- Race type: Thoroughbred – Flat racing

Race information
- Distance: 1 1/16 miles (8.5 furlongs)
- Surface: Turf
- Track: Left-handed
- Qualification: Fillies & Mares, three-years-old & up
- Weight: Assigned
- Purse: US$100,000

The Violet Stakes is an American Thoroughbred horse race held annually at Monmouth Park Racetrack in Oceanport, New Jersey. Inaugurated in 1977, the current Listed race is open to fillies and mares age three and older and is raced on turf over a distance of 1 1/16 miles (8.5 furlongs). First run at Meadowlands Racetrack in East Rutherford, New Jersey, it had its final running there in 2009. Not run in 2010, it was picked up by the Monmouth Park track in 2011 and as such was able to maintain its Grade 3 status.

== Historical notes ==
The event was run as the Violet Handicap until 2004. The inaugural running took place on September 4, 1977 at Meadowlands Racetrack on a rainy day that resulted in a sloppy track. The race was won by Lady Singer who was ridden by future U.S. Racing Hall of Fame jockey Angel Cordero Jr. for owner Walter Haefner and trainer Victor Nickerson. Haefner and Nickerson would get their second Violet Handicap win in 1985 with Vers La Caisse.

The Violet Stakes was raced on dirt in 1977, 1993, 1999, 2006 and was run in two divisions in 1980, 1982 through 1985, 1987 and 1988. It was due to safety concerns as a result of wet weather conditions that the 2006 race was switched from the turf course to the dirt track. On this occasion, the Violet Stakes was not given a grade.

The Very One, winner of the 1980 Violet Handicap, had The Very One Stakes at Pimlico and The Very One Stakes at Gulfstream Park named in her honor.

Gather The Clan's winning time in the 1989 race was just one-fifth of a second off the Meadowlands course record set on September 30, 1988 by Wanderkin.

== Records ==
Speed record:

- 1:39.60 – Gather The Clan (1989)

Most wins:

- 2 – Humoristic (2005, 2007)

Most wins by a jockey:

- 5 – Jean-Luc Samyn (1981, 1982, 1983, 1985, 1987)

Most wins by a trainer:

- 6 – Chad Brown (2016, 2018, 2020, 2021, 2023, 2024)

Most wins by an owner:

- 2 – Walter Haefner (1977, 1985)
- 2 – Edward P. Evans (1985, 1987)
- 2 – Bonner Farm (1990, 1992)
- 2 – Erdenheim Farm (1996, 1997)
- 2 – Mrs. Arturo Peralta-Ramos (2005, 2007)

== Winners ==
Year	Winner	Age	Jockey	Trainer	Owner	Dist. (Miles)	Time	Gr.
2025	Breath Away (GB)	5	Samy Camacho	Miguel Clement	Reeves Thoroughbred Racing, Tango Uniform Racing LLC and Rocco, Steven	1 1/6 m	1:44.00	BT
2024	Maman Joon (IRE)	4	Vincent Cheminaud	Chad C. Brown	AMO Racing	1 1/6 m	1:45.34	BT
2023	Beaute Cachee (FR)	4	Nik Juarez	Chad C. Brown	Madaket Stables	1 1/6 m	1:42.92	BT
2022	Vigilantes Way	5	Paco Lopez	Claude McGaughey III	Phipps Stable	1 1/6 m	1:41.78	L
2021	Tamahere	4	Jose Ferrer	Chad Brown	Swift Thoroughbreds Inc, Madaket Stables, Wonder Stables	1 1/6 m	1:45.74	L
2020	She's Got You	4	Joe Bravo	Chad Brown	John Gunther & Tanya Gunther	1 1/6 m	1:42.50	L
2019	Andina Del Sur	4	Hector Diaz Jr.	Thomas Albertrani	Don Alberto Stable	1 1/6 m	1:44.91	L
2018	Elysea's World	5	Joe Bravo	Chad Brown	Sheep Pond Partners & All Pro Racing	1 1/8 m	1:48.06	G3
2017	Tricky Escape	4	Chris DeCarlo	Lynn A. Ashby	Jon Marshall	1 1/8 m	1:49.91	G3
2016	Tammy the Torpedo	4	Antonio Gallardo	Chad Brown	Long Lake Stable & Beacon Hill Thoroughbreds	1 1/8 m	1:49.60	G3
2015	Photo Call	4	Trevor McCarthy	H. Graham Motion	Juliet Cooper	1 1/8 m	1:47.94	G3
2014	Rusty Slipper	4	Alex Cintron	H. Graham Motion	Zanim R. Meahjohn	1 1/8 m	1:49.07	G3
2013	Race not held							
2012	Ruthenia	4	Kendrick Carmouche	Christophe Clement	Virginia Kraft Payson LLC	1 1/6 m	1:40.68	G3
2011	Denomination	5	Joe Bravo	Christophe Clement	Ghislaine Head	1 1/6 m	1:41.92	G3
2010	Race not held							
2009	Quiet Harbor	4	Eddie Castro	C. R. McGaughey III	McGaughey Stable	1 1/6 m	1:41.30	G3
2008	American Border	4	Jose Lezcano	Jason Servis	Mr. Amore Stables (Ron Lombardi)	1 1/6 m	1:41.74	G3
2007	Humoristic	6	Rajiv Maragh	Hamilton A. Smith	Jacqueline Blanchard Peralta-Ramos	1 1/6 m	1:41.23	G3
2006	No Sleep	4	Mike Luzzi	Bruce N. Levine	Glencrest Farm LLC (Greathouse family)	1 1/6 m	1:42.48	†
2005	Humoristic	4	Harry Vega	Hamilton A. Smith	Jacqueline Blanchard Peralta-Ramos	1 1/6 m	1:42.23	G3
2004	Changing World	4	Pablo Fragoso	Barclay Tagg	Carolyn Horton Rogers	1 1/6 m	1:41.53	G3
2003	Dancal	5	Javier Castellano	Todd A. Pletcher	Marlon Aronstam	1 1/6 m	1:43.69	G3
2002	Babae	6	Richard Migliore	Frank A. Alexander	Joseph Platt Jr.	1 1/6 m	1:41.17	G3
2001	Clearly A Queen	4	Jorge Chavez	Bobby C. Barnett	John A. Franks	1 1/6 m	1:43.56	G3
2000	Follow The Money	4	Chris McCarron	David Hofmans	Christopher & Patricia Elia	1 1/6 m	1:42.65	G3
1999	Tookin Down	4	Edgar Prado	Richard W. Small	Richard W. Small	1 1/6 m	1:42.39	G3
1998	Heaven's Command	4	Richard Migliore	Christophe Clement	Skymarc Farm, Inc.	1 1/6 m	1:40.71	G3
1997	Sangria	4	Rick Wilson	John R. S. Fisher	Erdenheim Farm	1 1/6 m	1:42.02	G3
1996	Plenty Of Sugar	5	Robert Colton	John R. S. Fisher	Erdenheim Farm	1 1/6 m	1:48.62	G3
1995	Symphony Lady	5	Joe Bravo	Flint S. Schulhofer	Julian Cohen	1 1/6 m	1:45.48	G3
1994	It's Personal	4	John Velazquez	Michael W. Dickinson	Prestonwood Farm	1 1/6 m	1:42.61	G3
1993	Mz. Zill Bear	4	Edgar Prado	Ronald Cartwright	Mea Culpa Stable (Bill & Phyllis Dixon)	1 1/6 m	1:44.55	G3
1992	Highland Crystal	4	Edgar Prado	Barclay Tagg	Bonner Farm (George Rowand)	1 1/6 m	1:41.26	G3
1991	Southern Tradition	4	José Santos	Henry L. Carroll	Delehanty Farm (Frank Stella)	1 1/6 m	1:43.60	G3
1990	Miss Josh	4	Mario Pino	Barclay Tagg	Bonner Farm (George Rowand)	1 1/6 m	1:40.00	G3
1989	Gather The Clan	4	Craig Perret	William I. Mott	Bertram R. Firestone	1 1/6 m	1:39.60	G3
1988-1	Just Class	4	Chris Antley	Alan E. Goldberg	Robert Masterson	1 1/6 m	1:40.20	G3
1988-2	Graceful Darby	4	Randy Romero	John M. Veitch	James W. Phillips	1 1/6 m	1:41.00	G3
1987-1	Videogenic	5	Jean Cruguet	Gasper Moschera	Albert & Barbara Davis	1 1/6 m	1:42.00	G3
1987-2	Dismasted	5	Jean-Luc Samyn	Philip G. Johnson	Edward P. Evans	1 1/6 m	1:41.60	G3
1986	Lake Country	5	Vince Bracciale Jr.	Donnie Walker	Don Prowse & Donald McIntosh	1 1/6 m	1:41.20	G3
1985-1	Possible Mate	4	Jean-Luc Samyn	Philip G. Johnson	Edward P. Evans	1 1/6 m	1:42.20	G3
1985-2	Vers La Caisse	4	Richard Migliore	Victor J. Nickerson	Walter Haefner	1 1/6 m	1:43.00	G3
1984-1	Rash But Royal	4	Jack Kaenel	Richard A. DeStasio	Michael Berry	1 1/6 m	1:42.20	G3
1984-2	Aspen Rose	4	Jorge Velásquez	John M. Veitch	Daniel M. Galbreath	1 1/6 m	1:42.00	G3
1983-1	Twosome	4	Jerry Bailey	Laz Barrera	Charles T. Wilson Jr.	1 1/6 m	1:41.20	G3
1983-2	Geraldine's Store	4	Jean-Luc Samyn	Philip G. Johnson	Thomas P. Whitney	1 1/6 m	1:40.60	G3
1982-1	Pat's Joy	4	Jerry Bailey	Mitch Griffin	Fred W. Hooper	1 1/6 m	1:42.20	
1982-2	Dearly Too	3	Jean-Luc Samyn	Stephen A. DiMauro	Richard E. Bailey	1 1/6 m	1:42.20	
1981	Honey Fox	4	Jean-Luc Samyn	Flint S. Schulhofer	Jerome M. Torsney	1 1/6 m	1:41.40	
1980-1	Producer	4	Jeffrey Fell	Claude Beniada	Roy Gottlieb	1 1/6 m	1:41.60	
1980-2	The Very One	5	Jorge Velásquez	Stephen A. DiMauro	Helen Pollinger	1 1/6 m	1:42.40	
1979	Terpsichorist	4	Mike Venezia	Woody Stephens	Hickory Tree Stable	1 1/6 m	1:43.20	
1978	Navajo Princess	4	Craig Perret	Douglas Dodson	Victor N. Green	1 1/6 m	1:44.00	
1977	Lady Singer	4	Ángel Cordero Jr.	Victor J. Nickerson	Walter Haefner	1 1/6 m	1:48.40	

- † switched from turf to dirt, no grade allocated.
