= Dale Baird =

American racehorse trainer

Personal information
- Born: April 17, 1935 Martinsville, Illinois
- Died: December 23, 2007 (aged 72) Hancock County, Indiana
- Occupation: Trainer/Owner

Horse racing career
- Sport: Horse racing
- Career wins: 9,445

Racing awards
- Leading trainer at Mountaineer Racetrack (1981–2000); U.S. Champion Thoroughbred Trainer by wins (1971,1973,1979-82, 1985, 1991-93, 1995-99); Eclipse Special Award (2004)

Dale Baird (April 17, 1935 – December 23, 2007) was an American thoroughbred horse racing trainer who also held the record for the most races won in that sport, 9445, until that number was passed by Steve Asmussen.

== Career ==
Born in Martinsville, Illinois, Baird was brought up in the horse racing industry by his father, John I. Baird, who was also a successful horseman. He began his career as a jockey riding on local fair circuits, and turned to training after he grew too big to continue as a jockey. He made his training debut in 1961 at Ellis Park Racecourse in Henderson, Kentucky, and won his first race with a horse named New York. He soon established himself at Waterford Park (now Mountaineer Racetrack) in Chester, West Virginia, where he won every meet training title for 20 consecutive years between 1981 and 2000. Baird-trained horses amassed 9,445 victories over his 46-year career. The majority of his wins came at Mountaineer, and he owned nearly all of the horses that he trained. He was the nation's leading trainer, by wins 15 times between 1971 and 1999, and the leading owner 17 times. Baird was the first trainer to win 300 races in three consecutive years. In 2004, he recorded his 9,000th career training victory and was the first trainer in racing history to reach that plateau. He was honoured with a Special Eclipse Award by the National Thoroughbred Racing Association (NTRA) in 2005, highlighting the milestone and his whole career.

== Family Involvement ==
Dale's son, Bart, and brother John, also train horses at Mountaineer. John's son, Mike Baird, is also a Mountaineer conditioner.

== Death ==
On December 23, 2007, Baird died in a car crash that killed two other people. It was believed that high winds caused the empty horse trailer that he was hauling to tip over, causing Baird to lose control of his pick-up truck. He was in the midst of another successful year, having saddled 132 winners and collecting purses totalling $2,030,982 in 2007.
