= Rapid Redux =

American-bred Thoroughbred racehorse

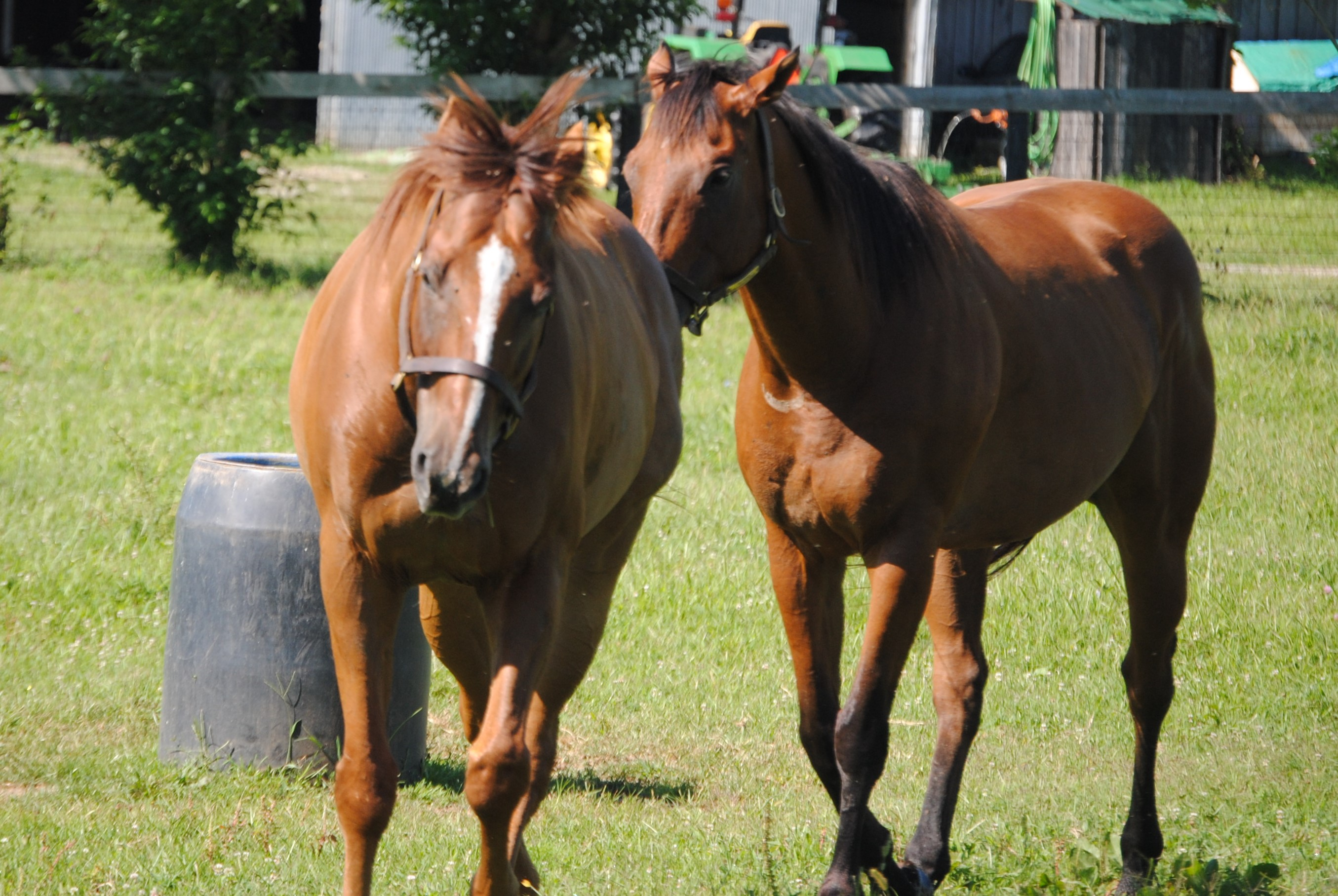
- Rapid Redux (left) at Old Friends Equine
- Sire: Pleasantly Perfect
- Grandsire: Pleasant Colony
- Dam: Thiscatsforcaryl
- Damsire: Storm Cat
- Sex: Gelding
- Foaled: 2006
- Country: United States
- Colour: Chestnut
- Breeder: Fortress Pacific Equine, LLC
- Owner: Robert Cole, Jr.
- Trainer: David J. Wells
- Record: 42: 28-1-1
- Earnings: $361,609

Awards
- Secretariat Vox Populi Award 2011; The Maryland Horse Industry Board Touch of Class Award (2012)

Honours
- The Eclipse Special Award 2011
- Last updated on Jan, 2012

Rapid Redux (foaled in Kentucky on February 24, 2006) is an American Thoroughbred racehorse who set an American record with 22 consecutive wins in 2012. The winter-born gelding was his sire Pleasantly Perfect's first runner.

As a two-year-old at Keeneland Sales's September 2007 auctions, Rapid Redux was sold for $85,000. His best finish at two was a distant third in the three-horse Tyro Stakes at Monmouth Park. By three, he was running in Claiming races.

Robert Cole, a Baltimore County native, claimed Rapid Redux at Penn National Race Course for $6,250 on October 13, 2010. The horse's win streak began on December 2, 2010, at the same track.

Trained by David J. Wells (based at Penn National), Rapid Redux has now won races at seven different tracks at distances from five furlongs to 1 1/8 miles, using seven riders during the streak.

== 2011 ==
Rapid Redux won 19 straight races in 2011, continuing his streak that began in 2010 and reached 22 races in a row in January 2012. The gelding's running style is to get quickly in front and stay there.

The chestnut gelding has equaled Citation's modern-day United States record by winning 19 races in a single season. He has also equaled the record of Pepper's Pride and Zenyatta. But while Citation was an American Triple Crown winner and is now in the Hall of Fame, Zenyatta ran in graded stakes races for all but her first two starts, and Pepper's Pride won in stakes races (though only in her birth state of New Mexico), Rapid Redux's accomplishments came in starter allowance races.

A day after it was announced that the now 6-year-old chestnut would receive the Eclipse Special Award for his accomplishments in 2011, he was named winner of the Secretariat Vox Populi Award ("Voice of the People"). The award, established by Penny Chenery in 2010 and first given to Zenyatta, recognizes a horse who has added in great measure to the sport of horse racing, distinguishing himself or herself by reaching out to the public in a positive and popular way. Four horses were considered for this honor: Havre de Grace, Uncle Mo, Goldikova and Rapid Redux. The winner was determined by the public's online poll results, opinions offered by the Vox Populi Committee, and input from Chenery. Rapid Redux received 39% of the votes.

In awarding Rapid Redux, Mrs. Chenery said: "Thousands of races are staged in America every year for every level of competition and thousands of horses win them, but rarely the same horse. So for one horse to beat his field 19 times in one year is flat out phenomenal..."

On November 21, 2011, at Mountaineer Park, Rapid Redux established the North American record of 20 wins in a row.

== 2012 ==
Rapid Redux began the year at Laurel Park by winning his 22nd straight race. After winning that race, he was retired. In March 2012, the Maryland Horse Industry Board honored Rapid Redux with its “Touch of Class” Award. In May 2012, he arrived at Old Friends Equine in Georgetown, Kentucky.

== See also ==
- List of leading Thoroughbred racehorses
