= Maryland Million Oaks =

- Class: Discontinued State-bred Stakes
- Location: Laurel Park Racecourse, Laurel, Maryland, United States
- Inaugurated: 1986
- Race type: Thoroughbred - Flat racing
- Website: www.marylandthoroughbred.com/newsindex.php?articleid=953

Race information
- Distance: 1 mile (8 furlongs)
- Surface: Dirt
- Track: left-handed
- Qualification: Three-year-old fillies
- Purse: $150,000

Maryland Million Oaks was an American Thoroughbred horse race held annually from 1986 thru 2012 primarily at Laurel Park Racecourse in Laurel, Maryland or at Pimlico Race Course in Baltimore. To be eligible for the Maryland Million Oaks, a horse had to be sired by a stallion who stands in Maryland. Due to that restriction the race is classified as a non-graded or "listed" stakes race and is not eligible for grading by the American Graded Stakes Committee.

The race was part of Maryland Million Day, a 12-race program held in mid October that was the creation of renowned television sports journalist Jim McKay. The "Maryland Million" is the first State-Bred showcase for Thoroughbreds. Since 1986, 27 other events in 20 states have imitated the showcase and its structure.

The race was run at 1 1/16 miles in 1991, 1992, 2001, 2002 and 2004. It was run as the Omni International Maryland Oaks in 1986 and 1987. From 1990 through 1993 the race was called the Challedon Society Maryland Oaks. It was called the Baltimore Magazine Maryland Oaks between 1995 and 1998. The metropolitan newspaper sponsored the race from 1999 through 2002 and it was called the Baltimore Sun Maryland Oaks. In 2004 the race was called the Cosequin Maryland Oaks and in 2007 the race was called the Maryland Lottery Oaks.

In its 24th running in 2009, the race was restricted to those horses who were sired by a stallion who stands in the state of Maryland. Both the entrant horse and their stallion had to be nominated to the Maryland Million program.

== Records ==
Speed record:

- 1 mile (8 furlongs) : 1:36.40 - Love That Dance (2009)
- 1 1/16 miles (9 furlongs) : 1:43.80 - Silmaril (2004)

Most wins by a jockey:

- 3 - Edgar S. Prado (1993, 1996, 1998)

Most wins by a trainer:

- 3 - Anthony W. Dutrow (1999, 2002, 2006)

Most wins by an owner:

- 1 - 25 different owners tied with one

== Winners ==
Year	Winner	Age	Jockey	Trainer	Owner	Dist. (Miles)	Time	Purse$
2012	Jazzy Idea	3	Elvis Trujillo	Edwin Merryman	Edwin Merryman	1 mile	1:38.64	$100,000
2011	Brushed by Love	3	Julian Pimentel	Michael J. Trombetta	Nona Lisa Stables LLC	1 mile	1:38.68	$100,000
2010	Baltimore Belle	3	Vladimir Diaz	J. B. Secor	Rob Gerczak/Kaygar Stable	1 mile	1:38.35	$100,000
2009	Love That Dance	3	Carlos H. Marquez Jr.	Benjamin Perkins	John Petrini	1 mile	1:36.40	$100,000
2008	Sweet Goodbye	3	J. D. Acosta	Christopher W. Grove	William R. Harris	1 mile	1:38.47	$150,000
2007	Moon Catcher	3	Tony Black	Timothy F. Ritchie	CJZ Racing Stable	1 mile	1:37.47	$150,000
2006	Smart and Fancy	3	Jeremy Rose	Anthony W. Dutrow	Win and Place Stable	1 mile	1:37.34	$150,000
2005	Sticky Fitzhugh LLC	3	Jozbin Z. Santana	Richard W. Small	Fitzhugh LLC	1-1/8	1:54.20	$150,000
2004	Silmaril	3	Abel Castellano Jr.	Christopher W. Grove	Stephen E. Quick	1-1/16	1:43.80	$100,000
2003	River Cruise	3	Jeremy Rose	Lawrence E. Murray	Sondra D. Bender	1-1/8	1:50.65	$100,000
2002	Undercover	3	Mario Pino	Anthony W. Dutrow	Anthony W. Dutrow	1-1/16	1:43.90	$100,000
2001	Along Came Mary	3	Travis Dunkelberger	H. James Bond	Gerald A. Nielsen	1-1/16	1:45.71	$100,000
2000	Gin Talking	3	Ramon Dominguez	Robin L. Graham	Skeedattle Associates	1-1/8	1:48.71	$100,000
1999	Saratoga Friends	3	Rick Wilson	Anthony W. Dutrow	Saratoga Friends Stable	1-1/8	1:51.00	$100,000
1998	Maragold Princess	3	Edgar S. Prado	Todd A. Pletcher	Michael Cascio	1-1/8	1:51.00	$100,000
1997	Proud Run	3	Nick Santagata	Richard J. Hendriks	Katharine W. Merryman	1-1/8	1:51.00	$100,000
1996	The Rulers Sister	3	Edgar S. Prado	Donald H. Barr	Childs & Childs Stable	1-1/8	1:49.00	$100,000
1995	Urbane	3	Corey Nakatani	Randy Bradshaw	Siegel Family	1-1/8	1:50.00	$100,000
1994	Churchbell Chimes	3	Alberto Delgado	J. William Boniface	Susan Granville	1-1/8	1:50.00	$100,000
1993	Champion Jay	3	Edgar S. Prado	Carlos A. Garcia	Herman J. Kossow	1-1/8	1:50.00	$100,000
1992	Deputation	3	Julie Krone	Claude McGaughey III	Stuart S. Janney III	1-1/16	1:44.00	$100,000
1991	Richards Lass	3	Jorge F. Chavez	Alfredo Callejas	Robert M. Perez	1-1/16	1:42.00	$100,000
1990	McKilts	3	Joe Rocco	W. Meredith Bailes	DanDar Farm	1-1/8	1:50.00	$100,000
1989	Beware of the Cat	3	Eddie Maple	Lazaro S. Barrera	Ryehill Farm	1-1/8	1:50.00	$100,000
1988	Oh My Pride	3	José A. Santos	Michael J. Moran	Ivy Dell Stud	1-1/8	1:51.00	$100,000
1987	Angelina County	3	Mario G. Pino	J. William Boniface	Carey K. Miller	1-1/8	1:50.00	$100,000
1986	Smart n Quick	3	Alberto Delgado	Katharine M. Voss	J. B. Merryman	1-1/8	1:51.00	$100,000

== See also ==
- Maryland Million Oaks top three finishers
- Maryland Million Day
- Laurel Park Racecourse
