= Maryland Million Sprint Handicap top three finishers =

This is a listing of the horses that finished in either first, second, or third place and the number of starters in the Maryland Million Sprint Handicap, an American state-bred stakes race for horses three-year-olds and up at six furlongs on the dirt held at Laurel Park Racecourse in Laurel, Maryland. (List 1986-present)

Year	Winner	Second	Third	Starters
2024	Celtic Contender	Band Camp	Freeze the Fire	9
2023	Seven's Eleven	Twisted Ride	Holy Synchronicity	9
2022	Fortheluvofbourbon	Karan's Notion	Alwaysinahurry	10
2021	Air Token	Double Crown	Valued Notion	8
2020	Karan's Notion	Baptize the Boy	Lewisfield	10
2019	Taco Supream	Call Paul	Lewisfield	9
2018	Lewisfield	Greatbullsoffire	Stolen Love	7
2017	Blu Moon Ace	Rockinn On Bye	Struth	7
2016	Nicaradalic Rocks	Morning Fire	Easy River	6
2015	Jack's in the Deck	Ben's Cat	D C Dancer	8
2014	D C Dancer	Always Smiling	Avarice	8
2013	Ribo Bobo	Action Andy	Fersmiley	4
2012	Action Andy	Javerre	Sloane Ranger	6
2011	Sloane Ranger	Regal Solo	Sandbagin' Lover	10
2010	Jack On the Rocks	Celtic Innis	Roaring Lion	n/a
2009	Roaring Lion	Celtic Innis	Saay Mi Name	n/a
2008	Celtic Innis	Lemons of Love	Grand Champion	n/a
2007	Grand Champion	Lemons of Love	Cayman Condo	n/a
2006	Ironton	Celtic Innis	Love's Strong Heart	n/a
2005	Saay Mi Name	Cherokee's Boy	American Proud	n/a
2004	My Poker Player	Crossing Point	Ameri Brilliance	n/a
2003	Michael's Pride	Crossing Point	Deer Run	n/a
2002	Deer Run	Smile My Lord	Summer Swing	n/a
2001	Jorgie Stover	In C C's Honor	Forty Eight Hours	n/a
2000	McKendree	Dr. Max	Tim's Crossing	n/a
1999	Aristotle	Romano Gucci	Storm Punch	n/a
1998	Greenspring Willy	Stormy Cloud	Sylvester Questor	n/a
1997	Aberfoyle	City Shelter	Tyaskin	n/a
1996	Punch Line	Military Look	Jolly Punch	n/a
1995	Foxie G.	Crumpton	Golden Tent	n/a
1994	Prenup	Who Wouldn't	Golden Tent	n/a
1993	Military Look	Jest Punching	Who Wouldn't	n/a
1992	Charlie You Know	Kelly's Class	Snow's Swell Gent	n/a
1991	Smart Alec	Allthathecouldsee	Hooliganism	n/a
1990	Jeweler's Choice	Born to Shop	Rockabye Joshua	n/a
1989	Deputy Shaw	Turn to Dancin	Born to Shop	n/a
1988	King's Nest	Hibernation	Silano	n/a
1987	Cool Joe	Mister S. M.	Rollodka	n/a
1986	King's Swan	Cool Joe	Color Me Smart	n/a

== See also ==
- Maryland Million Sprint Handicap
- Maryland Million Day
- Laurel Park Racecourse
