= Black Helen Handicap =

- Class: Discontinued stakes
- Location: Hialeah Park Race Track; Hialeah, Florida, United States
- Inaugurated: 1941
- Race type: Thoroughbred – Flat racing

Race information
- Distance: 1⅛ miles (9 furlongs)
- Surface: Turf
- Track: Left-handed
- Qualification: Fillies & Mares, three-years-old & up

The Black Helen Handicap was an American Thoroughbred horse race run annually at Hialeah Park Race Track in Hialeah, Florida, from 1941 through 2001. Open to fillies and mares age three and older, the Grade II event was raced on turf at a distance of a mile and an eighth (9 furlongs).

The race was named for Edward R. Bradley's U.S. Racing Hall of Fame mare Black Helen. The inaugural running took place on February 8, 1941, and was won by Sweet Willow at a distance of seven furlongs. The following year the race was run at a mile and an eighth and would remain at that distance for all subsequent editions.

== Historical notes ==
In 1948 the Black Helen Handicap had a Dead heat for win between Shotsilk and Rampart. It marked a rarity for a dead heat in that Rampart carried the highweight, in the field of ten, and Shotsilk the low weight. Fitz Eugene Dixon Jr.'s Shotsilk would turn out to be the only three-year-old to ever win the race.

Bewitch won the 1950 Black Helen Handicap by seven lengths in a time of 1:48 flat for a mile and one-eighth that was just 2/5 of a second off the World Record.

In 1968, Treacherous won the Black Helen Handicap but her win was overshadowed by jockey Ángel Cordero Jr. who set a Hialeah track record by riding six winners that day. One horse Cordero Jr. did not ride was Treacherous.

The 2000 running of the Black Helen Handicap was run at Gulfstream Park. It returned to Hialeah Park in 2001 for what would prove to be the final edition.

== Records ==
Speed record:

- 1:46.71 @ 11/8 miles – Class Kris (1996)

Most wins:

- In its 58 runnings, no horse ever won this race more than once.

Most wins by a jockey:

- 3 – Eddie Maple (1984, 1985, 1987)

Most wins by a trainer:

- 4 – H. Allen Jerkens (1963, 1967, 1970, 1975)

Most wins by an owner:

- 4 – Calumet Farm (1950, 1957, 1959, 1954)

== Winners ==
Year	Winner	Age	Jockey	Trainer	Owner	Dist. (Miles)	Time	Win$	Gr.
2001	Perfect Sting	5	Eibar Coa	Joe Orseno	Stronach Stables	11/8 M	1:47.17	$120,000	G2
2000	Snow Polina	5	Javier Castellano	William I. Mott	Gary A. Tanaka	11/8 M	1:49.91	$120,000	G2
1999	Anguilla	4	Julie Krone	Thomas J. Skiffington	John & Glenn Sikura	11/8 M	1:47.43	$120,000	G2
1998	Sopran Mariduff	4	Heberto Castillo Jr.	William I. Mott	Leonardo Ciampoli	11/8 M	1:47.30	$120,000	G2
1997	Powder Bowl	5	Herb McCauley	Jonathan E. Sheppard	Augustin Stable	11/8 M	1:48.80	$120,000	G2
1996	Class Kris	4	Gary Boulanger	James E. Picou	Fred W. Hooper	11/8 M	1:46.71	$120,000	G2
1995	Alice Springs	5	René R. Douglas	Jonathan E. Sheppard	Augustin Stable	11/8 M	1:48.74	$120,000	G2
1994	Aquilegia	5	Herb McCauley	Flint S. Schulhofer	Helen K. Groves	11/8 M	1:48.20	$120,000	G3
1993	Klassy Individual	7	René R. Douglas	Lawrence W. Jennings Jr.	Ballet Stable	11/8 M	1:48.50	$90,000	
1992	Grab the Green	4	José A. Santos	Barclay Tagg	Samuel Rogers	11/8 M (±)	1:48.00	$90,000	
1990	– 1991	Race not held							
1989	Love You by Heart	4	Jean Cruguet	John M. Veitch	Darby Dan Farm	11/8 M	1:50.40	$105,000	G2
1988	Anka Germania	5	José A. Santos	Thomas J. Skiffington	Glencrest Farm (David Greathouse)	11/8 M	1:49.80	$75,000	G2
1987	Lotka	4	Eddie Maple	Woody Stephens	Henryk de Kwiatkowski	11/8 M	1:46.80	$105,000	G2
1986	Shocker T.	4	Gene St. Leon	George Gianos	Thomasina Caporella	11/8 M	1:47.00	$60,000	G2
1985	Isayso	6	Eddie Maple	Michael O. Chamblee	Judie Nichols Chamblee	11/8 M	1:47.20	$60,000	G2
1984	Sabin	4	Eddie Maple	Woody Stephens	Henryk de Kwiatkowski	11/8 M	1:47.00	$75,000	G2
1983	Mistretta	4	Jerry D. Bailey	Woody Stephens	Ghislaine Head	11/8 M	1:46.80	$45,000	G2
1982	Honey Fox	5	Jean-Luc Samyn	Flint S. Schulhofer	Jerome Torsney	11/8 M	1:47.00	$60,000	G2
1981	The Very One	6	Jorge Velásquez	Stephen A. DiMauro	Helen M. Polinger	11/8 M	1:48.20	$45,000	G2
1980	Spring in Deepsea	5	Jean-Luc Samyn	Horatio Luro	Serge Fradkoff	11/8 M	1:51.00	$45,000	G2
1979	Late Bloomer	5	Jorge Velásquez	John M. Gaver Jr.	Greentree Stable	11/8 M	1:50.40	$30,000	G2
1978	Len's Determined	4	Jean Cruguet	Duke Davis	Leonard Smith	11/8 M	1:49.00	$30,000	G2
1977	Copano	5	Larry Saumell	Oral C. Pickard	J. D. King	11/8 M	1:49.80	$30,000	G2
1976	Yes Dear Maggy	4	Ruben Hernandez	Robert S. DuBois	John C. Oxley	11/8 M	1:48.40	$30,000	G2
1975	Garland of Roses	6	Ángel Cordero Jr.	H. Allen Jerkens	Hobeau Farm	11/8 M	1:49.00	$42,510	
1974	Dogtooth Violet	4	Don MacBeth	Stanley M. Rieser	Barbra Hunter	11/8 M	1:47.00	$42,770	
1973	Graffiti	5	Marco Castaneda	Horatio Luro	Louisa d'A Carpenter	11/8 M	1:49.80	$	
1972	Alma North	4	Frank Lovato	Frank J. Zitto	Eugene V. Mori	11/8 M	1:49.00	$41,990	
1971	Swoons Flower	4	Carlos H. Marquez	George Towne	Howard Sams	11/8 M	1:49.00	$41,080	
1970	Taken Aback	4	Braulio Baeza	H. Allen Jerkens	Hobeau Farm	11/8 M	1:49.20	$41,275	
1969	Amerigo Lady	5	Manuel Ycaza	J. Elliott Burch	Rokeby Stable	11/8 M	1:49.60	$43,225	
1968	Treacherous	4	Heliodoro Gustines	Sherrill W. Ward	Lazy F Ranch	11/8 M	1:49.00	$40,235	
1967	Mac's Sparkler	5	William Boland	H. Allen Jerkens	Hobeau Farm	11/8 M	1:48.60	$42,250	
1966	What A Treat	4	John L. Rotz	Sylvester Veitch	George D. Widener Jr.	11/8 M	1:50.40	$40,690	
1965	Old Hat	6	Donald Brumfield	Charles C. Norman	Stanley Conrad	11/8 M	1:49.80	$39,390	
1964	Princess Arle	4	John L. Rotz	Horace A. Jones	Calumet Farm	11/8 M	1:50.60	$39,455	
1963	Pocosaba	6	William Boland	H. Allen Jerkens	Pete Bostwick	11/8 M	1:49.40	$41,005	
1962	Seven Thirty	4	Larry Adams	Winbert F. Mulholland	George D. Widener Jr.	11/8 M	1:49.00	$33,215	
1961	Be Cautious	4	Bobby Ussery	John A. Nerud	Joseph M. Roebling	11/8 M	1:50.80	$30,095	
1960	Royal Native	4	Bill Hartack	Kenneth D. Noe Sr.	Perne L. Grissom	11/8 M	1:49.00	$30,160	
1959	Rosewood	5	Charlie Burr	Horace A. Jones	Calumet Farm	11/8 M	1:50.20	$25,350	
1958	Pardala	5	Dave Erb	Hugh L. Fontaine	D & H Stable (Jack Dudley/Bonnie Heath)	11/8 M	1:50.00	$28,400	
1957	Amoret	5	Bill Hartack	Horace A. Jones	Calumet Farm	11/8 M	1:54.60	$25,450	
1956	Clear Dawn	5	Logan Batcheller	Jack Long	Darby Dan Farm	11/8 M	1:49.40	$28,959	
1955	Rosemary B.	4	William M. Cook	Mose F. Shapoff	William L. Huntley	11/8 M	1:49.40	$24,500	
1954	Gainsboro Girl	4	Augustine Catalano	Walter D. Carroll	Shawmut Stable (Richard A. Jenks)	11/8 M	1:57.80	$23,600	
1953	Atalanta	5	Harrison B. Wilson	Jack Long	Darby Dan Farm	11/8 M	1:49.40	$23,600	
1952	Roman Miss	4	Kenneth Church	John Hanover	Harry F. Krimendahl	11/8 M	1:55.80	$18,175	
1951	Antagonism	4	Robert Bernhardt	James E. Fitzsimmons	Wheatley Stable	11/8 M	1:51.60	$15,050	
1950	Bewitch	5	Ovie Scurlock	Ben A. Jones	Calumet Farm	11/8 M	1:48.00	$13,825	
1949	Roman Candle	5	Logan Batcheller	Jack Webber	Gardenia Stable (Paul Newsom)	11/8 M	1:49.00	$16,850	
1948	Shotsilk (DH)	3	William M. Cook	Winbert F. Mulholland	Fitz Eugene Dixon Jr.	11/8 M	1:50.00	$10,950	
1948	Rampart (DH)	6	Mike Basile	Richard "Whitey" Nixon	Helene K. Haggerty	11/8 M	1:50.00	$10,950	
1947	Miss Grillo	5	Conn McCreary	Horatio Luro	Mill River Stable (Josephine Douglas)	11/8 M	1:49.80	$19,400	
1946	Adroit	6	Kenneth Scawthorn	Joseph W. Mergler	Mrs. Robert H. Heighe	11/8 M	1:51.80	$22,700	
1945	No race held due to WW II restrictions.								
1944	Silvestra	6	Ted Atkinson	Ross O. Higdon	Woolford Farm	11/8 M	1:52.20	$4,130	
1943	No race held due to WW II restrictions.								
1942	Pomayya	4	Basil James	J. J. McCabe	Brookmeade Stable	11/8 M	1:50.80	$9,075	
1941	Sweet Willow	4	Robert Howell	Robert W. Collins	Robert W. Collins	7 F	1:23.40	$4,810	
