= United States Champion Thoroughbred Trainer by wins =

There is recognition for the United States Champion Thoroughbred Trainer by wins but no formal award is given to the trainer in Thoroughbred flat racing whose horses won the most races in North American Thoroughbred racing.

Dale Baird holds the record for the most national titles with fifteen. Second is Hirsch Jacobs who won more races during a year than any other American trainer on eleven occasions. Tied for third all-time are Jack Van Berg and Steve Asmussen with nine. H. Guy Bedwell, trainer of Triple Crown winner Sir Barton, was a seven-time champion.

Champions since 1907:

Year	Trainer	Wins
2024	Steven M. Asmussen	408
2023	Steven M. Asmussen	379
2022	Steven M. Asmussen	382
2021	Steven M. Asmussen	455
2020	Steven M. Asmussen	420
2019	Karl Broberg	548
2018	Karl Broberg	509
2017	Karl Broberg	412
2016	Karl Broberg	367
2015	Karl Broberg	420
2014	Karl Broberg	325
2013	Steven Asmussen	307
2012	Jamie J. Ness	395
2011	Steven Asmussen	348
2010	Steven Asmussen	506
2009	Steven Asmussen	650
2008	Steven Asmussen	621
2007	Steven Asmussen	488
2006	Scott A. Lake	528
2005	Steven Asmussen	473
2004	Steven Asmussen	555
2003	Scott A. Lake	455
2002	Steven Asmussen	407
2001	Scott A. Lake	407
2000	Scott A. Lake	337
1999	Dale Baird	304
1998	Dale Baird	290
1997	Dale Baird	300
1996	Dale Baird	330
1995	Dale Baird	286
1994	Mario Beneito	247
1993	Dale Baird	269
1992	Dale Baird	256
1991	Dale Baird	296
1990	D. Wayne Lukas	267
1989	D. Wayne Lukas	305
1988	D. Wayne Lukas	318
1987	D. Wayne Lukas	343
1986	Jack Van Berg	266
1985	Dale Baird	249
1984	Jack Van Berg	250
1983	Jack Van Berg	258
1982	Dale Baird	276
1981	Dale Baird	349
1980	Dale Baird	306
1979	Dale Baird	316
1978	King T. Leatherbury	304
1977	King T. Leatherbury	322
1976	Jack Van Berg	496
1975	Richard E. Dutrow Sr.	352
1974	Jack Van Berg	329
1973	Dale Baird	305
1972	Jack Van Berg	286
1971	Dale Baird	245
1970	Jack Van Berg	282
1969	Jack Van Berg	239
1968	Jack Van Berg	256
1967	Everett Hammond	200
1966	Lou Cavalaris Jr.	175
1965	Howard Jacobson	200
1964	Howard Jacobson	169
1963	Howard Jacobson	140
1962	W. Hal Bishop	162
1961	Vester R. Wright	178
1960	Frank H. Merrill Jr.	143
1959	Vester R. Wright	172
1958	Frank H. Merrill Jr.	171
1957	Vester R. Wright	192
1956	Vester R. Wright	177
1955	Frank H. Merrill Jr.	154
1954	Robert H. McDaniel	206
1953	Robert H. McDaniel	211
1952	Robert H. McDaniel	168
1951	Robert H. McDaniel	164
1950	Robert H. McDaniel	156
1949	William Molter & W. Hal Bishop (Tie)	129
1948	William Molter	184
1947	William Molter	155
1946	William Molter	122
1945	Stanley Lipiec	127
1944	Hirsch Jacobs	117
1943	Hirsch Jacobs	128
1942	Hirsch Jacobs	133
1941	Hirsch Jacobs	123
1940	David Womeldorff	108
1939	Hirsch Jacobs	106
1938	Hirsch Jacobs	109
1937	Hirsch Jacobs	134
1936	Hirsch Jacobs	177
1935	Hirsch Jacobs	114
1934	Hirsch Jacobs	127
1933	Hirsch Jacobs	116
1932	George Alexandra	76
1931	John D. Mikel	72
1930	Charles Burton Irwin	92
1929	Loyd Gentry Sr.	74
1928	John F. Schorr & John Reed (Tie)	65
1927	Sam Hildreth	72
1926	William Perkins	82
1925	John J. Duggan	70
1924	James A. Parsons	93
1923	Charles Burton Irwin	147
1922	Henry E. McDaniel & James A. Parsons (tie)	78
1921	Sam Hildreth	85
1920	Kay Spence & S. Abner Clopton (tie)	74
1919	Kay Spence	96
1918	Kay Spence	58
1917	H. Guy Bedwell	66
1916	H. Guy Bedwell	123
1915	H. Guy Bedwell	97
1914	H. Guy Bedwell	84
1913	H. Guy Bedwell	87
1912	H. Guy Bedwell	84
1911	W. B. Carson	72
1910	Frank Ernest	105
1909	H. Guy Bedwell	122
1908	A. Jack Joyner	71
1907	James G. Rowe Sr., James Blute, Frank Hanlon (tie)	70

== See also ==
- United States Champion Thoroughbred Trainer by earnings
