= Marco Castaneda =

Personal information
- Born: June 15, 1950 (age 76) Bogotá, Colombia
- Occupation: Jockey

Horse racing career
- Sport: Horse racing
- Career wins: 3,163

Major racing wins
- Black Helen Handicap (1973); Royal Palm Handicap (1973); Vagrancy Handicap (1973); Belmont Futurity Stakes (1974); Excelsior Stakes (1974); Louisiana Derby (1974, 1976); Bonnie Miss Stakes 1st. div. (1975); Bonnie Miss Stakes 2nd. div. (1975); Bowling Green Handicap (1975); Hutcheson Stakes (1975); Niagara Handicap (1975); Eldorado Handicap (1976); Hollywood Gold Cup (1976); Del Mar Debutante Stakes (1977); Golden Gate Handicap (1977, 1981, 1986); La Jolla Mile Stakes (1977); Santa Ysabel Stakes (1977); Secretariat Stakes (1977); Thanksgiving Day Handicap (1977); California Derby (1978); Honeymoon Handicap (1978); Linda Vista Handicap (1978); Next Move Handicap (1980); Palos Verdes Handicap (1980); San Diego Handicap (1980); Gamely Handicap (1981); John C. Mabee Handicap (1981, 1982); La Cañada Stakes (1981); Monrovia Handicap (1981); Morvich Handicap (1981); Palomar Handicap (1981); Primonetta Stakes (1981); Ramona Handicap (1981, 1982); Rolling Green Handicap (1981); San Rafael Stakes (1981, 1982); Senator Ken Maddy Handicap (1981); Volante Handicap (1981); Yellow Ribbon Stakes (1981); Alibhai Handicap (1982); Las Palmas Handicap (1982); Hollywood Turf Cup Stakes (1982); San Gorgonio Handicap (1984); Yerba Buena Handicap (1984); Countess Fager Handicap (1985); Bay Meadows Handicap (1987); Tanforan Handicap (1987); Eatontown Handicap (1988); Salvator Mile Handicap (1988); Stuyvesant Handicap (1988); Pennsylvania Governor's Cup Handicap (1989); Dancing Count Stakes (1990); Hilltop Stakes (1990); Anne Arundel Stakes (1991); Federico Tesio Stakes (1991); Molly Pitcher Handicap (1991); Bay Meadows Derby (1991, 1994); Private Terms Stakes (1991); Golden Harvest Handicap (1992); Golden Poppy Handicap (1992); What a Pleasure Stakes (1993); Forward Gal Stakes (1994)

Racing awards
- George Woolf Memorial Jockey Award (1983); Jack Robinson Memorial Award (1987)

Significant horses
- Kilijaro, Queen To Conquer, Slew City Slew, Valay Maid

Marco Castaneda (born June 15, 1950) is a Colombian former jockey who competed in Thoroughbred racing. He emigrated to the United States in 1971 where he became one of the top riders of his era and winner of the 1983 George Woolf Memorial Jockey Award.

From a family of five jockeys, his younger brother Kelly r also met with success riding in the United States.

In 1987, Marco Castaneda was voted the Jack Robinson Memorial Award given annually by the Northern California Turf Writers Association at Bay Meadows Racetrack in San Mateo, California in honor of the widely respected Bay Area jockey who died in a racing accident on June 20, 1973, while trying to save a fellow jockey.

He retired permanently in 1997, having won 3,163 races in the United States and Canada.
