= Conniver Stakes =

American Thoroughbred horse race

- Class: Ungraded Stakes
- Location: Laurel Park Racecourse, Laurel, Maryland, United States
- Inaugurated: 1969
- Race type: Thoroughbred - Flat racing
- Website: www.laurelpark.com

Race information
- Distance: 7 furlongs
- Surface: Dirt
- Track: left-handed
- Qualification: Fillies & Mares; Three-year-olds & up
- Weight: Assigned
- Purse: $100,000

The Conniver Stakes is an American Thoroughbred horse race held annually in March at Laurel Park Racecourse in Laurel, Maryland. It is open to fillies and mares three years old and up and is run at seven furlongs on the dirt. An ungraded stakes race, it offers a purse of $100,000.

The race was named in honor of Conniver, the Maryland-bred that was named the nation's top handicap mare in 1948 during a season that included wins in the Brooklyn Handicap and Vagrancy Handicap (defeating Gallorette as well as Stymie). She also won the Beldame Stakes, the Comely Stakes and the Vagrancy Handicap. She was the brown daughter of Discovery out of The Schemer out of Challenger II and was bred by Alfred G. Vanderbilt II. She was owned by Harry LaMontagne, who purchased Conniver as a yearling for $1,500. The gawky, 17-hand mare was undistinguished at ages 2 and 3 and was nearly sold as a polo pony prior to the 1948 season. When Conniver retired at age 5, she had earned $227,825 from 56 starts with 15 wins, 6 seconds and 6 thirds.

== Records ==
Speed record:

- 7 furlongs - 1:23.00 - Winter Leaf (2002)
- 1 1/16 miles - 1:45.00 - Dear to All (1970)
- 1 1/8 miles - 1:49.00 - Stem the Tide (1992)

Most wins by an horse:

- 2 - Bold Affair (2012, 2013)

Most wins by an owner:

- 2 - Stephen E. Quick (2007, 2010)
- 2 - Mike Zanella/Charles Reed (2012, 2013)

Most wins by a jockey:

- 3 - Edgar Prado (1999, 2002, 2008)
- 3 - Vincent Bracciale, Jr. (1999, 2002, 2008)

Most wins by a trainer:

- 3 - Richard W. Small (1994, 2000, 2011)

== Winners of the Conniver Stakes since 1969 ==
Year	Winner	Age	Jockey	Trainer	Owner	Distance	Time	Purse
2022		-				7 fur.	1:23.21	$100,000
2021	Kiss the Girl	-	V. R. Carrasco	Michael J. Trombetta	Three Diamonds Farm	7 fur.	1:23.21	$100,000
2020	No Race	-	No Race	No Race	No Race	7 fur.	0.00.00	$100,000
2019	Anna's Bandit	5	Xavier Perez	Jerry Robb	No Guts No Glory Farm	7 fur.	1:23.50	$100,000
2018	Anna's Bandit	4	Xavier Perez	Jerry Robb	No Guts No Glory Farm	7 fur.	1:24.77	$100,000
2017	Next Best Thing	7	Julian Pimentel	Claudio Gonzalez	MCA Racing Stable	7 fur.	0:00.00	$100,000
2016	Candida H.	5	Julian Pimentel	Michael J. Trombetta	Fitzhugh LLC	7 fur.	1:24.05	$75,000
2015	Eddy Gourmet	5	Sheldon Russell	Hugh I. McMahon	Toby Roth	7 fur.	1:23.50	$100,000
2014	More Than a Cruise	5	Julian Pimentel	Lawrence E. Murray	Howard M. Bender	7 fur.	1:25.55	$100,000
2013	Bold Affair	5	Abel Castellano	Howard Wolfendale	Mike Zanella & Ch. Reed	7 fur.	1:25.14	$125,000
2012	Bold Affair	4	Abel Castellano	Howard Wolfendale	Mike Zanella & Ch. Reed	7 fur.	1:23.74	$100,000
2011	Fascinatin' Rhythm	6	Forest Boyce	Richard W. Small	Buckingham Farm	7 fur.	1:24.90	$75,000
2010	Sweet Goodbye	5	J. D. Acosta	Christopher Grove	William Harris	7 fur.	1:23.85	$70,000
2009	Fancy Diamond	5	Harry Vega	Cathal Lynch	Kildare Stable	7 fur.	1:23.72	$60,000
2008	All Giving	4	Erick D. Rodriguez	Flint W. Stites	Concepts Unlim.Stable	7 fur.	1:24.40	$60,000
2007	Silmaril	6	Ryan Fogelsonger	Christopher Grove	Stephen E. Quick	7 fur.	1:25.00	$75,000
2006	Spirited Game	5	Jose Caraballo	Dove Houghton	Wirth Brothers	7 fur.	1:23.60	$75,000
2005	Chrusciki	5	Ryan Fogelsonger	A. Ferris Allen, III	Nancy Lee Farms	7 fur.	1:26.00	$60,000
2004	Bronze Abe	5	Erick D. Rodriguez	Grover G. Delp	Samuel Bayard	7 fur.	1:23.60	$75,000
2003	Gazillion	4	Ramon Dominguez	Hamilton A. Smith	Lucy C. Kessler	7 fur.	1:24.40	$60,000
2002	Winter Leaf	4	Larry Reynolds	Ronald Cartwright		7 fur.	1:23.00	$60,000
2001	A Lot of Mary	6	Bruce Kravets	Scott A. Lake	WinStar Farm	7 fur.	1:24.40	$60,000
2000	Shashobegon	5	Jozbin Santana	Richard W. Small		7 fur.	1:24.40	$60,000
1999	Halo's Security	5	Nick Goodwin	Robert L. Beall	Robert L. Beall	7 fur.	1:24.40	$60,000
1998	Brush Over	4	Edgar Prado	Dale Capuano	Donald H. Mensh	7 fur.	1:23.60	$60,000
1997	Secret Prospect	4	Carlos H. Marquez	John J. Tammaoro	Alan S. Kline	7 fur.	1:23.80	$60,000
1996	Julie's Brilliance	4	Mark T. Johnston	King T. Leatherbury		7 fur.	1:23.60	$60,000
1995	Queen Letizia	4	Nick Goodwin	King T. Leatherbury		7 fur.	1:23.80	$60,000
1994	Fleet Broad	4	Steve Hamilton	Richard W. Small		7 fur.	1:24.20	$60,000
1993	Silver Tango	5	Mike Luzzi	Gary Capuano	Jeanne F. Begg	7 fur.	1:24.40	$60,000
1992	Brilliant Brass	5	Edgar Prado	Carlos A. Garcia		7 fur.	1:23.60	$60,000
1991	Run Spot	6	Edgar Prado	Katherine M. Voss	Mrs. John B. Merryman	7 fur.	1:25.00	$60,000
1990	Double Artemis	4	Mark T. Johnston			7 fur.	1:24.20	$60,000
1989	Eesee's Taw	4	Kent Desormeaux			6.5 fur.	1:16.60	$65,000
1988	Parade of Roses	5	Vincent Bracciale Jr.			7 fur.	1:23.20	$60,000
1987	Tulindas	4	Mike Sellers			6.5 fur.	1:17.60	$48,500
1986	La Caleche	3	Allen Stacy			1 mile	1:39.40	$58,000
1985	La Reine Elaine	4	Greg Hutton			1 mile	1:35.40	$42,000
1984	Final Chapter	4	Vincent Bracciale Jr.			1 1/16 mi	1:47.40	$43,000
1983	Kattegat's Pride	4	Donnie Miller Jr.		Stephen E. Quick	1 1/16 mi	1:47.10	$42,000
1982	Lady Dean	4	Donnie Miller Jr.		David P. Reynolds	1 1/16 mi	1:45.60	$40,000
1981	Contrary Rose	5	Vincent Bracciale Jr.		A. S. Kline	1 1/16 mi	1:47.00	$40,000
1980	Sentencia	4	Arnold Iliescu		Charles A. Cuprill	1 1/16 mi	1:49.00	$30,000
1979	Silver Ice	4	Greg McCarron		C. Oliver Goldsmith	1 1/16 mi	1:46.80	$30,000
1978	Lucky Penny	5	Leroy Moyers			1 1/16 mi	1:48.00	$30,000
1977	Shark's Jaw	4	Leroy Moyers			1 1/16 mi	1:48.00	$30,000
1976	War Exchange	4	James Mosely		Dr. A. E. Verdi	1 1/16 mi	1:45.80	$30,000
1975	Sarah Percy	7	Chris McCarron		Mrs. Richard Worthington	1 1/16 mi	1:46.80	$35,000
1974	Euonymous	5	Herbert Hinojosa			1 1/16 mi	1:47.00	$23,500
1973	Alma North	5	Ron Turcotte			1 1/16 mi	1:46.40	$23,500
1972	Lead Me On	5	Eldon Nelson		Mooring Stable	1 1/16 mi	1:45.60	$23,500
1971	Daring Step	4	Anthony Agnello	Eddie McMullen	Greystone Manor Stable	1 1/16 mi	1:46.60	$23,500
1970	Dear to All	4	John Baboolal			1 1/16 mi	1:45.00	$23,500
1969	Miss Spin	6	Garth Patterson		Flamingo Farm	1 1/16 mi	1:47.00	$23,500

== See also ==
- Conniver Stakes top three finishers
