= What A Summer Stakes =

- Class: Ungraded Stakes
- Location: Laurel Park Racecourse, Laurel, Maryland, United States
- Inaugurated: 1978
- Race type: Thoroughbred – Flat racing
- Website: www.Laurelpark.com

Race information
- Distance: 6 furlongs
- Surface: Dirt
- Track: Left-handed
- Qualification: Fillies & Mares; Four-year-olds & up
- Weight: Assigned
- Purse: US$100,000

The What A Summer Stakes is an American Thoroughbred horse race held annually in January at Laurel Park Racecourse in Laurel, Maryland. The race is open to fillies and mares four years old and up and is run at six furlongs on the dirt.

An ungraded stakes race, it offers a purse of $100,000. The race was restricted to Maryland-breds between 1978 and 1992. It was run for fillies and mares from age three and up from 1978 through 1985 and was run under handicap conditions during that same time. The race was restricted to two-year-olds from 1985 to 1992.

The race was named in honor of What A Summer, a gray mare by What Luck. She was an Eclipse Award winner and was named American Champion Sprint Horse in 1977. She was bred in Maryland by Milton Polinger. What A Summer was a foal in 1973 and won 18 of 31 starts in her career. She won the de facto second leg of the filly Triple Crown, the Black-Eyed Susan Stakes, won the Fall Highweight Handicap twice (carrying 134 pounds each time), the Silver Spoon Handicap twice, the Maskette Handicap and four other stakes. In addition to her 18 wins, she placed nine times with earnings of $479,161. That record of 27 first or second finishes in 31 starts at 87% is among the best in history.

What A Summer was trained by Bud Delp while racing for Polinger. She was bought by Diana Firestone following Polinger's death in 1976. Mrs. Firestone turned the mare over to trainer LeRoy Jolley. She was named Maryland-bred horse of the year in 1977 and twice was named champion older mare. What A Summer was retired in 1878 and as a broodmare produced several graded stakes winners.

The venue for the 1994 race was Gulfstream Park.

== Records ==
Speed record:

- 6 furlongs – 1:09.20 – Xtra Heat (2003)
- 7 furlongs – 1:23.60 – Sea Siren (1983)

Most wins by an horse:

- 2 – Silmaril (2006 & 2007)
- 2 – Sweet on Smokey (2016 & 2017)

Most wins by an owner:

- 3 – Stephen E. Quick (1982, 2007 & 2008)

Most wins by a jockey:

- 2 – six different jockeys share this record with 2 wins each

Most wins by a trainer:

- 3 – Christopher W. Grove (2007, 2008 & 2010)

== Winners of the What A Summer Stakes since 1978 ==
Year	Winner	Age	Jockey	Trainer	Owner	Distance	Time	Purse
2026	Passage East	5	Sheldon Russell	Brittany T. Russell	Hugh McMahon	6 fur.	1:10.37	$100,000
2025	Ms. Bucchero	5	Xavier Perez	Diane D. Morici	Morici Racing Stable LLC (Diane D. Morici)	6 fur.	1:12.25	$100,000
2024	Anonymously	8	Andres Chavez	Jose Corrales	Diane Balsamo	6 fur.	1:12.98	$100,000
2023	Fille D’Esprit	7	Xavier Perez	John J. Robb	C J I Phoenix Group & No Guts No Glory Farm	6 fur.	1:11.70	$100,000
2022	Time Limit	5	Victor Carrasco	Michael J. Maker	Three Diamonds Farm (Kirk, Debra, & son Jordan Wycoff (Manager)	6 fur.	1:11.39	$100,000
2021	Hello Beautiful	4	Sheldon Russell	Brittany T. Russell	Madaket Stables (Sol Kumin, Managing Partner)	6 fur.	1:10.67	$100,000
2018	Ms Locust Point	4	Jorge Vargas Jr.	John Servis	Cash is King LLC	6 fur.	1:09.78	$100,000
2017	Sweet on Smokey	5	Victor Carrasco	Claudio Gonzalez	BB Horses’	6 fur.	1:11.89	$100,000
2016	Sweet on Smokey	4	Victor Carrasco	Claudio Gonzalez	Bruno La Banca	6 fur.	1:11.00	$75,000
2015	Lady Sabelia	5	Horacio Karamanos	Robin Graham	Mrs. Frank Wright	6 fur.	1:12.01	$100,000
2014	Winning Image	7	Anthony Black	Micahel C. Aro	Martin Scafidi	6 fur.	1:10.37	$100,000
2013	Bold Affair	5	Abel Castellano	Howard Wolfendale	Charles J. Reed & Michael Zanella	6 fur.	1:10.61	$125,000
2012	No race	–	No race	No race	No race	No race	No race	No race
2011	Aspenglow	5	Travis Dunkelberger	Gary Capuano	Nancy L. Terhune	6 fur.	1:10.21	$75,000
2010	Sweet Goodbye	5	J. D. Acosta	Christopher W. Grove	William R. Harris	6 fur.	1:11.02	$70,000
2009	Access Fee	5	Jose Caraballo	Larry Murray	Sondra Bender	6 fur.	1:10.31	$60,000
2008	Silmaril	7	Jeremy Rose	Christopher W. Grove	Stephen E. Quick	6 fur.	1:10.20	$90,000
2007	Silmaril	6	Ryan Fogelsonger	Christopher W. Grove	Stephen E. Quick	6 fur.	1:11.00	$100,000
2006	Flame of Love	6	Jozbin Santana	Scott A. Lake	McCarty Racing	6 fur.	1:10.36	$60,000
2005	Sensibly Chic	5	Steve Hamilton	Timothy Tullock Jr.	Lois S. Nervitt	6 fur.	1:09.80	$50,000
2004	Bronze Abe	5	Erick Rodriguez	Grover G. Delp	Samuel Bayard	6 fur.	1:10.40	$75,000
2003	Xtra Heat	5	Rick Wilson	John Salzman	Kenneth Taylor	6 fur.	1:09.20	$60,000
2002	Outstanding Info	4	Jose Caraballo	Frank Generazio Jr.	Patricia Generazio	6 fur.	1:10.20	$50,000
2001	Doc Calls Her Kate	4	Roberto Alvarado Jr.	Anthony Correnti	Rhodyo Stable, Inc.	6 fur.	1:11.40	$60,000
1993-2000	No race	–	No race	No race	No race	No race	No race	No race
1992	Carnirainbow	2	Greg Hutton	John J. Robb	Hal C. B. Clagett	7 fur.	1:26.80	$60,000
1991	Set to Fly	2	Rick Wilson	Ben W. Perkins Jr.	Richard L. Golden	7 fur.	1:25.40	$75,000
1990	Gala Goldilocks	2	Greg McCarron	Bernard P. Bond	Leonard "Skip" Leviton	7 fur.	1:23.80	$75,000
1989	Valay Maid	2	Jorge Duarte	Carlos A. Garcia	Ginny Wright	7 fur.	1:25.80	$75,000
1988	Hard Headed Woman	2	Mario Pino	Hamilton G. Smith	Robert Summers	7 fur.	1:25.00	$75,000
1987	Sham Say	2	Ben Feliciano	William B. Cox	Eugene Ford Sr.	7 fur.	1:24.60	$65,000
1986	Wainee Church	2	Donnie A. Miller Jr.	Charles Peoples	Bayard Sharp	7 fur.	1:26.20	$36,500
1985	Gala de Oro	2	Ben Feliciano	Bernard P. Bond	Gertrude Leviton	7 fur.	1:24.40	$40,500
1984	Artful Girl	5	Paul Nicol Jr.	John W. Hicks III	Cyrus D. Beddard	6 fur.	1:11.80	$16,500
1983	Sea Siren	5	Vincent Bracciale Jr.	Filemon Veriay	Hilltop Stable (Clarence Nagro)	7 fur.	1:23.60	$30,000
1982	Kattegat's Pride	3	Donnie A. Miller Jr.	Joseph A. Devereux	Stephen E. Quick	7 fur.	1:24.20	$30,000
1981	Privacy	3	Carlos Barrera	Stanley M. Hough	Bertram and Diana Firestone	6 fur.	1:12.00	$30,000
1980	Denim Gal	3	Joe Imparato	Pedro Briones	Chiquita Farm (Beatriz Gonzalez)	6 fur.	1:12.00	$30,000
1979	Silver Ice	3	Vincent Bracciale Jr.	Joseph P. Considine	C. Oliver Goldsmith	6 fur.	1:11.00	$30,000
1978	Debby's Turn	4	Greg McCarron	Thomas E. Field	Red Hill Farm (John & Helen Wallace)	6 fur.	1:10.80	$28,100

== See also ==
- What A Summer Stakes top three finishers
