= Maryland Million Sprint Handicap =

- Class: Restricted State-bred Stakes
- Location: Laurel Park Racecourse, Laurel, Maryland, United States
- Inaugurated: 1986
- Race type: Thoroughbred – Flat racing
- Website: www.marylandthoroughbred.com/newsindex.php?articleid=953

Race information
- Distance: 3/4 miles (6 furlongs)
- Surface: Dirt
- Track: left-handed
- Qualification: Three-year-olds and up
- Purse: $100,000

Maryland Million Sprint Handicap is an American Thoroughbred horse race held annually in October since 1986 primarily at Laurel Park Racecourse in Laurel, Maryland or at Pimlico Race Course in Baltimore. To be eligible for the Maryland Million Sprint Handicap, a horse must be sired by a stallion who stands in Maryland. Due to that restriction the race is classified as a non-graded or "listed" stakes race and is not eligible for grading by the American Graded Stakes Committee.

The race is part of Maryland Million Day, a 12-race program held in mid-October that was the creation of renowned television sports journalist Jim McKay. The "Maryland Million" is the first State-Bred showcase event ever created. Since 1986, 27 other events in 20 states have imitated the showcase and its structure.

In 1986 the race was called the First National Bank of Maryland Sprint Handicap. In 1987 and 1988 the race was called the Jiffy Lube Sprint Handicap. In 1989 the race was sponsored by the state Department of Tourism and was called the State of Maryland Sprint Handicap. From 1990 to 1993 the race was called the U.S. Air Maryland Sprint Handicap. In 1994–1995 the race was called the B.W.I. Airport Maryland Sprint Handicap. In 2003 the race was called the Susquehanna Bank Maryland Sprint Handicap and in 2007 the race was called the Fasi-Tipton Sprint Handicap. The race currently offers a purse of $100,000.

In its 30th running in 2015, the race was restricted to those horses who were sired by a stallion who stands in the state of Maryland. Both the entrant horse and their stallion must be nominated to the Maryland Million program.

== Records ==
Most wins:

- no multiple winners of the Maryland Million Sprint Handicap

Speed record:

- 1:08.56 – McKendree (2000)

Most wins by an owner:

- no multiple winners of the Maryland Million Sprint Handicap

Most wins by a jockey:

- 3 – Mario Pino (2002, 1996 and 1991)
- 3 – Ramon Domínguez (2009, 2007 and 2003)

Most wins by a trainer:

- 3 – Richard Dutrow (1998, 1988 and 1986)

== Winners of the Maryland Million Sprint Handicap since 1986 ==
Year	Winner	Age	Jockey	Trainer	Owner	Distance	Time	Purse
2024	Celtic Contender	3	Victor R. Carrasco	Hamilton A. Smith	Lewis Family Racing Stable	6 fur.	1:09.87	$101,000
2023	Seven's Eleven	3	Angel Cruz	Carlos A. Mancilla	The Cottonwood Stable	6 fur.	1:10.49	$101,000
2022	Fortheluvofbourbon	4	Paco Lopez	Michael V. Pino	Smart Angle	6 fur.	1:10.96	$102,000
2021	Air Token	4	J. D. Acosta	Jose Corrales	Corrales Racing	6 fur.	1:09.63	$100,000
2020	Karan's Notion	3	Yomar Ortiz	Nancy Heil	Nancy Heil	6 fur.	1:09.15	$102,000
2019	Taco Supream	4	Sheldon Russell	Damon R. Dilodovico	Big Bertha Stable	6 fur.	1:08.80	$100,000
2018	Lewisfield	5	Jevian Toledo	Jeff C. Runco	Linda Zang	6 fur.	1:09.08	$100,000
2017	Blu Moon Ace	4	Julian Pimentel	Kevin Patterson	Robert L. Cole Jr.	6 fur.	1:09.06	$100,000
2016	Nicaradalic Rocks	3	Angel Serpa	Kieron Magee	T D C B E Stable	6 fur.	1:09.89	$100,000
2015	Jack's in the Deck	6	Forest Boyce	Robin L. Graham	Jones/Graham	6 fur.	1:10.74	$100,000
2014	D C Dancer	4	Angel Serpa	Michael Trombetta	TomRus LLC	6 fur.	1:09.93	$100,000
2013	Ribo Bobo	5	Julian Pimentel	John Servis	Mr. Amore Stable	6 fur.	1:08.64	$100,000
2012	Action Andy	5	Horacio Karamanos	C. Garcia	Robert Gerczak	6 fur.	1:10.39	$100,000
2011	Sloane Ranger	5	Horacio Karamanos	Martin E. Ciresa	Vicki Schowe	6 fur.	1:10.15	$100,000
2010	Jack On The Rocks	5	Sheldon Russell	Gary Gullo	Funky Munky Stable	6 fur.	1:09.85	$100,000
2009	Roaring Lion	5	Ramon Domínguez	Bruce N. Levine	Repole Stable	6 fur.	1:08.68	$100,000
2008	Celtic Innis	6	Craig Gibbs	Timothy L. Keefe	E. Allen Murray Jr.	6 fur.	1:10.81	$150,000
2007	Grand Champion	4	Ramon Domínguez	James A. Jerkens	Susan & John Moore	6 fur.	1:10.27	$150,000
2006	Irontron	6	Jeremy Rose	Scott A. Lake	Trade Winds Stable	6 fur.	1:09.54	$150,000
2005	Saay Mi Name	5	Chris VanHassel	Wayne M. Bailey	Wayne M. Bailey	6 fur.	1:10.68	$150,000
2004	My Poker Player	4	Ryan Fogelsonger	Bruce N. Levine	Roddy Valente	6 fur.	1:10.13	$100,000
2003	Michael's Pride	6	Ramon Domínguez	Howard Wolfendale	Edward E. Turner	6 fur.	1:24.11	$100,000
2002	Deer Run	3	Mario Pino	Christopher Grove	William R. Harris	6 fur.	1:10.47	$100,000
2001	Jorgie Stover	3	Michael J. McCarthy	John V. Alecci	P & J Stable	6 fur.	1:10.47	$100,000
2000	McKendree	4	Mark Johnston	Scott A. Lake	E & G Stables	6 fur.	1:08.56	$100,000
1999	Aristotle	3	Michael J. McCarthy	Louis Albertrani	Paraneck Stable	6 fur.	1:09.40	$100,000
1998	Greenspring Willy	3	Larry C. Reynolds	Richard E. Dutrow	Post Time 96	6 fur.	1:10.20	$100,000
1997	Aberfoyle	5	Mark Johnston	John J. Lenzini Jr.	C. Frank Hopkins	6 fur.	1:10.60	$100,000
1996	Punch Line	6	Mario Pino	William H. Turner Jr.	Althea Richards	6 fur.	1:09.80	$100,000
1995	Foxie G	4	Edgar Prado	Dale Capuano	Phillip Capuano	6 fur.	1:09.40	$100,000
1994	Prenup	3	José A. Santos	Mark A. Hennig	Edward P. Evans	6 fur.	1:09.00	$100,000
1993	Military Look	3	Kent Desormeaux	Charles Hadry	Stuart S. Janney, III	6 fur.	1:09.40	$100,000
1992	Charlie You Know	4	Steve D. Hamilton	Wallace Neilson	Joseph C. Perry	6 fur.	1:10.60	$100,000
1991	Smart Alec	3	Mario Pino	Richard W. Delp	Mrs. W. F. L. Tutle	6 fur.	1:10.80	$100,000
1990	Jeweler's Choice	5	Craig Perret	John W. Hicks, III	G. A. Huguely	6 fur.	1:09.80	$100,000
1989	Deputy Shaw	4	José C. Ferrer	David Monaci	Ron Davis	6 fur.	1:09.20	$100,000
1988	King's Nest	3	Chris McCarron	Richard E. Dutrow Sr.	Sondra Bender	6 fur.	1:10.20	$100,000
1987	Cool Joe	5	Vincent Bracciale Jr.	H. Allen Jerkens	Country Roads	6 fur.	1:11.40	$100,000
1986	King's Swan	6	Vincent Bracciale Jr.	Richard E. Dutrow Sr.	Moshe Asher Stable	6 fur.	1:11.00	$100,000

== See also ==
- Maryland Million Sprint Handicap top three finishers
- Maryland Million Day
- Laurel Park Racecourse
