= Eatontown Stakes =

- Class: Grade III
- Location: Monmouth Park Racetrack; Oceanport, New Jersey, United States
- Inaugurated: 1971 (as Eatontown Handicap)
- Race type: Thoroughbred – Flat racing
- Website: Monmouth Park Racetrack

Race information
- Distance: 1 1/16 miles
- Surface: Turf
- Track: Left-handed
- Qualification: Fillies and Mares, three-years-old and older
- Weight: Base weights with allowances: Older: 124 lbs 3YOs: 121 lbs
- Purse: $150,000 (2020)

The Eatontown Stakes is a Grade III American Thoroughbred horse race for fillies and mares, three years old and older over a distance of 1 1/16 miles on the turf course scheduled annually in June at Monmouth Park Racetrack in Oceanport, New Jersey and currently offers a purse of $150,000 plus a trophy.

== History ==
The event is named after Eatontown, New Jersey, a Borough near the Monmouth Park track.

The inaugural running of the event was on 9 August 1971, on the closing day of the 1971 Monmouth Park summer meeting as the Eatontown Handicap and was won by the 35-1 longshot in the field, a six-year-old Chilean mare Flor De Sombra in a time of 1:46 4/5. Flor De Sombra was claimed earlier that year by Joseph W. Mergler at Gulfstream Park for $14,500.

The following year the event was run in split divisions. The event has been held in split divisions seven times with the last occurrence in 1987.

The event was taken of the turf in 1977 due to state of the track after inclement weather and held on the main dirt track. The event was held on the main track in 2006 and 2020.

For three runnings of the event, from 1988 and 1990 the race was run over the slightly longer distance of 1 1/8 miles.

In 1996 the event was upgraded by the American Graded Stakes Committee of the Thoroughbred Owners and Breeders Association to Grade III status. The event has held with this status until 2020 when the event was automatically downgraded to Listed class due to the race been run off the turf.

Since 2013 the event has been held as the Eatontown Stakes with stakes allowance conditions.

== Records ==
Speed record:

- 1 1/16 miles – 1:39.26 Laughing (IRE) (2013)

Margins:

- 6 1/4 lengths – Jacuzzi Boogie (CAN) (1990)

Most wins:

- 2 – Telly (1972, 1973)

Most wins by a jockey:

- 3 – Vincent Bracciale Jr. – (1972 - both divisions, 1973)
- 3 – Nick Santagata – (1987, 1991, 1992)
- 3 – Joe Bravo – (1995, 2009, 2017)
- 3 – Paco Lopez – (2015, 2016, 2019)

Most wins by a trainer:

- 5 – Chad C. Brown (2017, 2018, 2023, 2024, 2025)

Most wins by an owner:

- 2 – Cambridge Stables (1972, 1973)
- 2 – Klaravich Stables (2023, 2024)

== Winners ==
Year	Winner	Age	Jockey	Trainer	Owner	Distance	Time	Purse	Grade	Ref
Eatontown Stakes
2026	Gimme a Nother (SAF)	6	Jorge Ruiz	H. Graham Motion	Newstead Stables	1 1/16 miles	1:42.90	$150,000	III	
2025	Whiskey Decision	4	Samy Camacho	Chad C. Brown	Fred W. Hertrich lll & John D. Fielding	1 1/16 miles	1:44.81	$147,500	III	
2024	Tax Implications (GB)	4	Flavien Prat	Chad C. Brown	Klaravich Stables	1 1/16 miles	1:43.98	$152,500	III	
2023	Consumer Spending	4	Samy Camacho	Chad C. Brown	Klaravich Stables	1 1/16 miles	1:42.00	$150,000	III	
2022	Stolen Holiday	5	Jose Lezcano	Claude R. McGaughey III	Annette Allen	1 1/16 miles	1:42.30	$152,500	III	
2021	Vigilantes Way	5	Paco Lopez	Claude R. McGaughey III	Phipps Stable	1 1/16 miles	1:41.90	$165,000	III	
2020	Valiance	4	Nik Juarez	Todd A. Pletcher	Eclipse Thoroughbreds, Martin S. Schwartz & China Horse Club	1 1/16 miles	1:44.25	$153,500	Listed	Off turf
2019	Valedictorian	5	Paco Lopez	Kelly J. Breen	Epic Racing	1 1/16 miles	1:43.70	$165,000	III	
2018	Dream Awhile	4	Irad Ortiz Jr.	Chad C. Brown	Joseph Allen	1 1/16 miles	1:41.59	$98,000	III	
2017	Grand Jete (GB)	4	Joe Bravo	Chad C. Brown	Juddmonte Farms	1 1/16 miles	1:41.30	$111,000	III	
2016	Isabella Sings	4	Paco Lopez	Todd A. Pletcher	Siena Farms	1 1/16 miles	1:40.57	$103,000	III	
2015	I'm Already Sexy	5	Paco Lopez	Wayne M. Catalano	Hit The Board Stables	1 1/16 miles	1:41.29	$107,000	III	
2014	Medea (IRE)	5	Forest Boyce	Francis Abbott III	Cornerstone Thoroughbreds	1 1/16 miles	1:41.89	$103,000	III	
2013	Laughing (IRE)	5	Angel Serpa	Alan E. Goldberg	Richard Santulli	1 1/16 miles	1:39.26	$99,000	III	
Eatontown Handicap
2012	Silver Screamer	4	Jose L. Espinoza	Rudy R. Rodriguez	Michael Imperio & Bill Elias Stables	1 1/16 miles	1:40.41	$105,000	III	
2010	Gypsy's Warning (SAF)	5	Jose Valdivia Jr.	H. Graham Motion	Team Valor International & Green Lantern Stables	1 1/16 miles	1:41.79	$147,000	III	
2009	All Is Vanity (FR)	5	Joe Bravo	Christophe Clement	Jedburgh Stud	1 1/16 miles	1:41.67	$150,000	III	
2008	Social Queen	5	Jose Lezcano	Alan E. Goldberg	Jayeff B Stables	1 1/16 miles	1:40.40	$150,000	III	
2007	Karen's Caper	5	Brice Blanc	Robert J. Frankel	Stonerside Stable	1 1/16 miles	1:39.48	$150,000	III	
2006	Brunilda (ARG)	6	Eddie Castro	Stanley M. Hough	Cobra Farm	1 1/16 miles	1:44.00	$150,000	III	Off turf
2005	Smart N Classy	5	Jose A. Velez Jr.	John J. Tammaro III	Roseland Farm Stable	1 1/16 miles	1:46.22	$165,000	III	
2004	Ocean Drive	4	Eibar Coa	Todd A. Pletcher	Bonnie & Sy Baskin	1 1/16 miles	1:41.79	$100,000	III	
2003	Stylish	5	Heberto Castillo Jr.	William I. Mott	The Thoroughbred Corporation	1 1/16 miles	1:41.69	$100,000	III	
2002	Clearly a Queen	5	Eibar Coa	Teresa M. Pompay	John A. Franks	1 1/16 miles	1:44.02	$100,000	III	
2001	Cousin Gigi	4	Rick Wilson	Timothy A. Hills	Harry Minassian Sr.	1 1/8 miles	1:47.50	$100,000	III	
Eatontown Stakes
2000	Recyclada (CHI)	5	Alex O. Solis	Richard E. Mandella	Diamond A Racing	1 1/16 miles	1:44.34	$100,000	III	
1999	Formal Tango	4	Jerry D. Bailey	Albert Stall Jr.	David Hulkewicz & Michael Rainier	1 1/16 miles	1:42.62	$100,000	III	
1998	Gastronomical	5	Gary L. Stevens	James J. Toner	Prestonwood Farm & G. Arthur Seelbinder	1 1/16 miles	1:43.39	$69,000	III	
1997	B. A. Valentine	4	Chris McCarron	Dale L. Romans	Alberta Butner	1 1/16 miles	1:41.32	$69,100	III	
Eatontown Handicap
1996	Gail's Brush	5	Gary Boulanger	Edwin T. Broome	Edwin T. Broome	1 1/16 miles	1:40.40	$75,000	III	
Eatontown Stakes
1995	Symphony Lady	5	Joe Bravo	Flint S. Schulhofer	Julian Cohen	1 1/16 miles	1:43.64	$50,000	Listed	
1994	Verbal Volley	5	Robert E. Colton	John H. Forbes	Bethlehem Stables	1 1/16 miles	1:44.71	$40,000	Listed	
1993	Topsa	6	Luis Romero Rivera Jr.	Thomas Victor Smith	Robert E. Masterson	1 1/16 miles	1:46.39	$35,000	Listed	
1992	Red Journey	4	Nick Santagata	Mark E. Casse	Harry T. Mangurian Jr.	1 1/16 miles	1:45.06	$35,000	Listed	
1991	Jacuzzi Boogie (CAN)	4	Nick Santagata	Edward T. Allard	Estate of John H. Costello	1 1/16 miles	1:41.67	$35,000		
Eatontown Handicap
1990	Miss Unnameable	6	Larry Saumell	D. Wayne Lukas	Leonard D. Mathis	1 1/8 miles	1:48.00	$56,850		
1989	Highland Penny	4	Dennis Carr	Susan H. Duncan	Raven Brook Farm	1 1/8 miles	1:50.00	$57,950		
1988	Hear Music (CAN)	5	Marco Castaneda	John Charalambous	John Charalambous	1 1/8 miles	1:49.80	$57,400		
1987	Bailrullah	5	Nick Santagata	William W. Wright	Laura Leigh Stable	1 1/16 miles	1:44.00	$46,850		Division 1
1987	Cadabra Abra	4	Herb McCauley	Daniel Perlsweig	Jerry R. Pinkley	1 1/16 miles	1:43.80	$47,650		Division 2
1986	Mazatleca (MEX)	6	Craig Perret	Alan E. Goldberg	Betty G. Marcus	1 1/16 miles	1:43.20	$46,600		Division 1
1986	Bharal	5	Jorge Velasquez	Thomas M. Bush	P. J. Andrews	1 1/16 miles	1:43.80	$47,000		Division 2
1985	Agacerie	4	Angel Cordero Jr.	Jan H. Nerud	Tartan Stables	1 1/16 miles	1:44.20	$58,050		
1984	Jubilous	4	Gregg McCarron	Woodford C. Stephens	Hickory Tree Stable	1 1/16 miles	1:43.40	$61,000		
1983	Doodle	4	Jimmy J. Miranda	Edward I. Kelly Jr.	William H. Perry	1 1/16 miles	1:44.00	$47,350		
1982	Kuja Happa	4	Danny Wright	D. Michael Smithwick Sr.	Templeton Stable	1 1/16 miles	1:44.80	$45,775		
1981	Wayward Lassie	4	Daryl Montoya	Patrick J. Kelly	Live Oak Plantation	1 1/16 miles	1:44.60	$25,262		Division 1
1981	Endicotta	5	Don Brumfield	Stanley M. Rieser	Endicott P. Davidson	1 1/16 miles	1:44.80	$27,862		Division 2
1980	Nasty Jay	5	Robert E. McKnight	Harold B. Brice Jr.	Kenneth J. Edwards	1 1/16 miles	1:44.00	$33,812		Division 1
1980	Riddle's Reply	4	Ernest Cardone	Guy J. Lyon	Christopher Meccia & Hebert Prince	1 1/16 miles	1:44.20	$33,463		Division 2
1979	The Very One	4	Charles Cooke	Monti W. Sims	Helen Polinger	1 1/16 miles	1:46.20	$38,825		
1978	Huggle Duggle	4	Bernie Gonzalez	Albert S. Barrera	Leslie Combs II	1 1/16 miles	1:42.60	$34,025		
1977	Jolly Song	5	John Nied Jr.	William T. Raymond	Middletown Stables	1 1/16 miles	1:47.20	$28,600		Off turf
1976	† Collegiate	4	James W. Edwards	Anthony J. Bardaro	Bright View Farm	1 1/16 miles	1:43.60	$23,000		Division 1
1976	Stage Luck	4	James W. Edwards	John R. S. Fisher	Theodosia M. Nolan	1 1/16 miles	1:43.80	$22,750		Division 2
1975	Hinterland	5	Craig Perret	Howard M. Tesher	Exeter Stable	1 1/16 miles	1:43.60	$27,900		
1974	Bird Boots	5	Buck Thornburg	Edgar L. Vansant	Jack R. Hogan	1 1/16 miles	1:46.80	$29,550		
1973	‡ Telly	5	Vincent Bracciale Jr.	William O. Hicks	Cambridge Stables	1 1/16 miles	1:43.60	$22,712		Division 1
1973	Cathy Baby	4	Miguel A. Rivera	William R. Corbellini	Mereworth Farm	1 1/16 miles	1:42.60	$22,512		Division 2
1972	Telly	4	Vincent Bracciale Jr.	William O. Hicks	Cambridge Stables	1 1/16 miles	1:42.40	$22,238		Division 1
1972	Best Go	4	Vincent Bracciale Jr.	C. Whaler	R. Smiser West	1 1/16 miles	1:42.40	$22,487		Division 2
1971	Flor De Sombra (CHI)	6	Herberto Hinojosa	Joseph W. Mergler	Briardale Farm	1 1/16 miles	1:46.80	$28,875		

Legend:
Dirt Turf
Notes:
‡ In the running of the first division of the event in 1973, Lightning Lucy was first past the post winning by a head margin but was disqualified for interference in the straight after a protest was lodged against her and Telly was declared the winner.
† In the running of the first division of the event in 1976, Copano was first past the post but was disqualified for interference in the straight and Collegiate was declared the winner.

== See also ==
List of American and Canadian Graded races
