= Anne Arundel Stakes =

American Thoroughbred horse race

Anne Arundel County Stakes
- Class: Ungraded Stakes
- Location: Laurel Park Racecourse, Laurel, Maryland, United States
- Inaugurated: 1974
- Race type: Thoroughbred – Flat racing
- Website: www.laurelpark.com

Race information
- Distance: 5.5 furlongs
- Surface: Turf
- Track: left-handed
- Qualification: Fillies; Two-years-old
- Weight: Assigned
- Purse: US$100,000

The Anne Arundel County Stakes is an American Thoroughbred horse race that was revived in 2019 and is held annually in September at Laurel Park in Laurel, Maryland.It is open to two-year-old fillies and is run at five-and-a-half furlongs on the turf.

An ungraded stakes race, it offers a purse of $100,000. The race was named in honor of Anne Arundel County, Maryland, the county in which Laurel is located. The county itself was named for Lady Anne Arundel, wife of Cecilius Calvert, 2nd Baron Baltimore and founder of the colony of Maryland. The state capital of Annapolis is located in Anne Arundel County. The race was run as the Anne Arundel Handicap from 1975–1993 and was a grade III stakes race from 1984 through 1989. The race was formerly run at one mile (eight furlongs) on the dirt and was open to fillies ages three and up. The race was not run and was on hiatus from 2009 to 2018.

== Records ==
Speed record:

- 1 mile – 1:35.60 – Caught in Amber (1980)
- 1 1/8 miles – 1:49.20 – Essence (2004)

Most wins by a jockey:

- 4 – Mario Pino (1981, 1983, 1995, 2003)

Most wins by a trainer:

- 2 – Donald H. Barr (1997, 1998)
- 2 – Robin L. Graham (1995, 2000)

== Winners ==
Year	Winner	Age	Jockey	Trainer	Owner	Dist. (Miles)	Time	Purse $	Gr.
2019	Miss J McKay	2	Trevor McCarthy	Cal Lynch	Maxis Stable, Madaket Stables and Wonder Stables				
2007	2019	Race not held							
2006	Leah's Secret	3	Mark Guidry	Helen Pitts	First Klass Stables	1 mile	1:36.60	$125,000	
2005	Trickle of Gold	3	Jeremy Rose	Michael Gorham	John Murphy	1 mile	1:37.00	$100,000	III
2004	Essence	3	John R. Velazquez	Todd Pletcher	Padua Stables	1-1/8	1:49.20	$100,000	III
2003	Smooth Maneuvers	3	Mario Pino	Michael Pino	Nick Sanna Stables	1-1/8	1:51.40	$100,000	III
2002	Martha's Music	3	Stewart Elliott	John Servis	D.J.'s Stables	1-1/8	1:50.80	$100,000	III
2001	no race	–	no race	no race	no race	no race	0:00.00	no race	III
2000	Gin Talking	3	Ramon A. Dominguez	Robin L. Graham		1-1/8	1:50.20	$100,000	III
1999	Undermine	3	Larry Melancon	William G. Huffman		1-1/8	1:49.20	$100,000	III
1998	Merengue	3	Mark Johnston	Donald H. Barr	Gerald C. Dickens	1-1/8	1:51.80	$100,000	III
1997	G. O'Keefe	3	Mark Johnston	Donald H. Barr		1-1/8	1:51.20	$100,000	III
1996	Hey Let's Dance	3	Seth Martinez	Jessica Campitelli		1-1/8	1:50.80	$75,000	III
1995	Blue Sky Princess	3	Mario Pino	Robin L. Graham		1-1/8	1:51.40	$75,000	III
1994	Miss Slewpy	3	Larry Reynolds	Ronald Cartwright		1-1/8	1:51.00	$75,000	
1993	By Your Leave	3	Mario Pino	Henrietta Alexander		1-1/8	1:52.40	$55,000	
1992	Avian Assembly	3	Larry Reynolds	James W. Murphy		1-1/8	1:50.60	$50,000	
1991	Devilish Touch	3	Marco Castaneda	Carlos Garcia		7 fur.	1:24.20	$50,000	
1990	McKilts	3	Joe Rocco			1-1/8	1:50.40	$55,000	
1989	Misty Ivor	3	Michael Hunter	W. Meredith Bailes	William Harris	1-1/8	1:49.60	$75,000	III
1988	Empress Tigere	3	Gregg McCarron			1-1/8	1:49.80	$95,000	III
1987	Doubles Partner	3	Ángel Cordero Jr.			1 mile	1:37.20	$80,000	III
1986-1	Burt's Dream	3	Rick Watson			1 mile	1:36.00	$12,000	III
1986-2	Toes Knows	3	Danny Ray Wright			1 mile	1:36.40	$80,000	III
1985	Classy Cut	3	Donnie A. Miller Jr.			1 mile	1:36.80	$62,000	III
1984	Dowery	3	Anthony Black			1 mile	1:37.00	$60,000	III
1983	Quixotic Lady	3	Gregg McCarron	Woody Stephens	Eleanor K. Ryan	1 mile	1:36.80	$60,000	
1982	Kattegat's Pride	3	Donnie A. Miller Jr.			1 mile	1:37.40	$60,000	
1981	Up the Flagpole	3	Mario Pino			1 mile	1:36.20	$60,000	
1980	Caught in Amber	3	Danny Ray Wright		O'Brien Brothers	1 mile	1:35.60	$55,000	
1979	Jameela	3	William J. Passmore			1 mile	1:38.00	$55,000	
1978	The Very One	3	Charley Cooke	Stephen A. DiMauro	Helen Polinger	1 mile	1:40.00	$45,000	
1977	Worrisome Thing	3	Heriberto Hinojosa			1 mile	1:37.40	45,000	
1976	What A Summer	3	Chris McCarron	LeRoy Jolley	Diana M. Firestone	1 mile	1:38.20	$27,500	
1975	My Juliet	3	Darrel McHargue	Eugene Euster	George Weasel Jr.	1 mile	1:36.80	$30,000	
1974	Pinch Pie	3	Chuck Baltazar		Christiana Stable	1 mile	1:37.40	$27,000	

== See also ==
- Anne Arundel Stakes top three finishers and starters
