= Scott A. Lake =

Trainer of Thoroughbred racehorses (born 1965)

Scott Lake
Personal information
- Born: June 29, 1965 (age 61) Harrisburg, Pennsylvania, United States
- Occupation: Trainer

Horse racing career
- Sport: Horse racing
- Career wins: 6,301+ (ongoing)

Major racing wins
- Maryland Million Sprint Handicap (2000); Salvator Mile Handicap (2000); Baltimore Breeders' Cup Handicap ( 2000); Conniver Stakes (2001); Gallant Bob Handicap (2002); Bold Ruler Handicap (2003); Gravesend Handicap (2003); Smile Sprint Handicap (2003); True North Handicap (2003); General George Handicap (2003); Count Fleet Sprint Handicap (2004); Longfellow Stakes (2005, 2007); Paumonok Handicap (2005); What A Summer Stakes (2006); Horatius Stakes (2007); Nearctic Stakes (2008); Select Stakes (2008); Miss Woodford Stakes (2009)

Racing awards
- U.S. Champion Trainer by wins (2000, 2001, 2003, 2006); Delaware Park Champion Trainer by wins (2002-2008)

Significant horses
- Shake You Down, Thunderello

Scott A. Lake (born June 29, 1965, in Harrisburg, Pennsylvania) is an American trainer of Thoroughbred racehorses who, on April 4, 2019, became the sixth trainer in North American racing history to record 6,000 wins. As at February 2, 202023 he is ranked sixth all time in career wins with 6,301.

== Multiple Championships ==
Scott Lake began his training career at Penn National Race Course in Grantville, Pennsylvania, where he got his first win in June, 1987. Since then he has been the United States Champion Thoroughbred Trainer by wins four times and has won seven consecutive training titles at Delaware Park Racetrack. The official Breeders Cup website says that Lake "Has won dozens of training titles at Penn National, Philadelphia Park, Delaware Park, Pimlico and Laurel Park. Although he started out mainly conditioning horses he or an owner had claimed, by the beginning of the 2000s Lake began to work with stakes quality horses. He won more races in the State of Maryland than any other trainer in 2005, 2006, 2007, 2008 and 2009. For 2010 he cut back substantially on the number of horses under his care, going down to 70 from 287.
