= The Very One =

American-bred Thoroughbred racehorse

- Sire: One For All
- Grandsire: Northern Dancer
- Dam: Veruschka
- Damsire: Venture
- Sex: Mare
- Foaled: 1975
- Country: United States
- Colour: Bay
- Breeder: Myrna Firestone & Peter Odell
- Owner: Helen Polinger
- Trainer: 1) Monti W. "Sonny" Sims; 2) Stephen A. DiMauro
- Record: 71: 22-12-9
- Earnings: $1,030,120

Major wins
- Santa Barbara Handicap (1981); Dixie Handicap (1979); Sheepshead Bay Handicap (1980); Long Island Handicap (1980); Chrysanthemum Handicap (1980, 1981); Santa Ana Handicap (1980); Anne Arundel Handicap (1978); Black Helen Handicap (1980); Queen Charlotte Handicap (1980); Violet Handicap (1980); Eatontown Handicap (1979); Parlo Handicap (1980)

Honors
- The Very One Stakes at Pimlico Race Course; The Very One Stakes at Gulfstream Park
- Last updated on April 25, 2020

The Very One (1975–1992) was a millionaire American Thoroughbred racehorse mare. Owned by Helen Polinger and bred by Myrna Firestone and Peter Odell in Kentucky, she is a daughter of One For All, who in turn was sired by Hall of Famer and prominent sire Northern Dancer. He was out of the mare Veruschka sired by Venture.

Trained by Stephen A. DiMauro, The Very One is best known for her grade two score in the 1979 Dixie Handicap at Pimlico Race Course. After winning twelve graded stakes races in 1978 and 1979, she won the grade one Santa Barbara Handicap at Santa Anita Park in 1981 at age six.

== Dixie Handicaps ==
The Very One was stabled and trained in Maryland and was owned by Olney native Helen Polinger. After two years of racing, it was determined by her owner and trainer, Monti "Sonny" Sims [Dimauro trained her later in her career], that The Very One was a turf specialist. Mrs. Polinger was raised in Maryland and had always wanted to run a horse in the Preakness Stakes. This was her chance to do the next best thing: run a horse in the Dixie Handicap. The Dixie is Maryland's top race on the turf, run on Preakness day immediately prior to the Preakness Stakes.

In May 1979 at age four, The Very One competed in the $125,000 Grade II Dixie Handicap at Pimlico Race Course in Baltimore, Maryland. She was the only female in the field of nine and was given an eight-pound weight allowance (carrying 108 pounds) because of her gender. She was ridden by Charlie Cooke and pulled away to win by two lengths over two graded stakes winning five-year-olds in That's a Nice and Fluorescent Light. She set a new stakes record and track record for a mile and a half on the turf at 2:28 3/5. It was the fastest time run in 28 years at that distance.

In 1980 as a five-year-old, The Very One had already won six stakes races and came back to defend her title at "Old Hilltop" (Pimlico) in the Dixie. Since she had fared so well that year and won the Dixie Handicap the year prior, she was given a weight allowance of only two pounds (carrying 116 pounds compared to 118). In that race, she was ridden by a different jockey than her regular rider. She performed well but gave up the lead at the wire to place second by a half length to graded stakes winner Marquee Universal.

== Other Stakes wins ==
The Very One raced for five years between 1977 and 1981. Her first stakes win came in 1978 when she won the Anne Arundel Handicap at Laurel Park Racecourse. In 1979, she won the Eatontown Handicap and the Parlo Handicap. She also won two stakes races in New York City in 1980: the grade two Sheepshead Bay Handicap at Belmont Park and the grade three Long Island Handicap at Aqueduct Racetrack. She won the grade three Chrysanthemum Handicap in 1980 and 1981 at Pimlico Race Course. In 1980, she won the Santa Ana Handicap, the Black Helen Handicap, the Queen Charlotte Handicap and the Violet Handicap. In 1981, she won the grade one Santa Barbara Handicap at Santa Anita.

== Stakes placings ==
The Very One ran second in two grade one races: the Washington D.C. International Handicap at Laurel Park Racecourse to Bowl Game and in the Santa Margarita Invitational Handicap at Santa Anita, both in 1979. She ran second to Hall of Famer John Henry in the grade two Hialeah Turf Cup Handicap, placed second in the Orchid Handicap (G2), the Diana Handicap (G2), the grade three Gallorette Handicap at Pimlico Race Course. She placed second in the grade three Chrysanthemum Handicap before winning that race the next two years. She ran second to Just a Game in the Flower Bowl Handicap in 1980 and finished second to Pearl Necklace in the Flower Bowl in 1979. She ran third in the Turf Classic Stakes (G1), the San Juan Capistrano Invitational (G1), the Japan Cup (G1), the Queen Charlotte Handicap (G3), the Barbara Fritchie Handicap (G3), and the Beverly Hills Handicap (G3).

== Retirement ==
The Very One never produced a foal close to herself in racing ability and neither have any of her daughters. She died on July 10, 1992, at Polinger Farm in Olney, Maryland.
