= The Very One Stakes (Gulfstream Park) =

- Class: Grade III
- Location: Gulfstream Park; Hallandale Beach, Florida, United States
- Inaugurated: 1984 (as The Very One Handicap)
- Race type: Thoroughbred – Flat racing – Turf
- Sponsor: MyRacehorse (since 2025)
- Website: Gulfstream Park

Race information
- Distance: 1 3/8 miles
- Surface: Turf
- Track: Left-handed
- Qualification: fillies and mares, four years old and older
- Weight: 123 lbs with allowances
- Purse: US$150,000 (since 2022)

The Very One Stakes is a Grade III American Thoroughbred horse race for fillies and mares that are four years or older run over a distance of 1 3/8 miles (11 furlongs) on the turf held annually in late February or early March at Gulfstream Park, Hallandale Beach, Florida. The event currently carries a purse of $150,000.

== History ==
The race was inaugurated on 10 May 1987 and was run as The Very One Handicap over a distance of one mile.

The event was named after the winning mare The Very One who won 22 races in her career including the Grade I Santa Barbara Handicap. The event was not held in 1988 and 1989.

The event was upgraded to Grade III in 1996.

The event was predominantly run at 1 3/8 miles but was shortened to the current distance of 1 3/16 miles in 2016. The distance of the event was returned back to 1 3/8 miles in 2022.

== Records ==
Speed record:

- 1 3/16 miles — 1:51.40 Suffused (GB) (2017)
- 1 3/8 miles — 2:11.31 Just Basking (2026)

Margins:

- 9 1/2 lengths — Bungalow (1992)

Most wins:

- 2 – Holy Helena (2018, 2019)

Most wins by a jockey

- 5 – Jerry D. Bailey (1990, 1994, 1996, 2001, 2002)

Most wins by a trainer

- 7 – Christophe Clement (1998, 1999, 2001, 2002, 2007, 2008, 2015)

Most wins by an owner

- 2 – Juddmonte Farms (2013, 2017)
- 2 – Stronach Stables (2018, 2019)

== Winners ==
Year	Winner	Age	Jockey	Trainer	Owner	Distance	Time	Purse	Grade	Ref
The Very One Stakes
2026	Just Basking	5	Javier Castellano	Ian R. Wilkes	Andrew Schwarz & Wendy Gilder Schwarz	1 3/8 miles	2:11.31	$150,000	III	
2025	Beach Bomb (SAF)	5	Luis Saez	H. Graham Motion	Cayton Park Stud	1 3/8 miles	2:14.03	$150,000	III	
2024	R Calli Kim	4	Tyler Gaffalione	Brendan P. Walsh	Averill Racing & Two Eight Racing	1 3/8 miles	2:13.01	$150,000	III	
2023	Mylady (GER)	4	Edgard Zayas	Chad C. Brown	Michaela Faust	1 3/8 miles	2:15.14	$150,000	III	
2022	Virginia Joy (GER)	5	Irad Ortiz Jr.	Chad C. Brown	Peter M. Brant	abt. 1 3/8 miles	2:15.92	$150,000	III	
2021	Antoinette	4	José L. Ortiz	William I. Mott	Godolphin Racing	1 3/16 miles	1:53.70	$125,000	III	
2020	Elizabeth Way (IRE)	4	Paco Lopez	Roger L. Attfield	John J. McCormack	1 3/16 miles	1:54.26	$150,000	III	
2019	Holy Helena	5	Irad Ortiz Jr.	James A. Jerkens	Stronach Stables	1 3/16 miles	1:54.20	$150,000	III	
2018	Holy Helena	4	Irad Ortiz Jr.	James A. Jerkens	Stronach Stables	1 3/16 miles	1:54.67	$150,000	III	
2017	Suffused (GB)	5	José L. Ortiz	William I. Mott	Juddmonte Farms	1 3/16 miles	1:51.40	$150,000	III	
2016	Olorda (GER)	4	Julien R. Leparoux	Chad C. Brown	Martin S. Schwartz	1 3/16 miles	1:54.51	$150,000	III	
2015	Irish Mission	6	John R. Velazquez	Christophe Clement	Robert S. Evans	1 3/8 miles	2:18.66	$150,000	III	
2014	Inimitable Romanee	6	Alan Garcia	H. Graham Motion	Gallagher's Stud	1 3/8 miles	2:15.50	$100,000	III	
2013	Starformer	5	Edgar S. Prado	William I. Mott	Juddmonte Farms	1 3/8 miles	2:18.03	$100,000	III	
2012	Here to Win (BRZ)	6	Joe Bravo	Kiaran P. McLaughlin	Trick or Treat International	1 3/8 miles	2:13.22	$100,000	III	
2011	Keertana	5	Jose Lezcano	Thomas F. Proctor	Barbara Hunter	1 3/8 miles	2:19.33	$98,000	III	
2010	Changing Skies (IRE)	5	Kent J. Desormeaux	William I. Mott	Swettenham Stud	1 3/8 miles	2:16.27	$100,000	III	
2009	Criticism (GB)	5	Edgar S. Prado	Thomas Albertrani	Darley Stable	1 3/8 miles	2:15.23	$100,000	III	
The Very One Handicap
2008	Mauralakana (FR)	5	René R. Douglas	Christophe Clement	Robert Scarborough	1 1/8 miles	1:49.94	$100,000	III	
2007	Royal Highness (GER)	5	Edgar S. Prado	Christophe Clement	Monceaux Stable	1 3/8 miles	2:12.63	$100,000	III	
2006	Dynamite Lass	4	Rafael Bejarano	Kiaran P. McLaughlin	Alfred Corrado	1 7/16 miles	2:18.81	$100,000	III	
2005	Honey Ryder	4	John R. Velazquez	Todd A. Pletcher	Glencrest Farm	1 3/8 miles	2:11.71	$100,000	III	
2004	Binya (GER)	5	John R. Velazquez	Kiaran P. McLaughlin	Joseph Allen	1 3/8 miles	2:19.65	$100,000	III	
2003	San Dare	5	Mark Guidry	Rick Hiles	David G. Mounts	1 3/8 miles	2:13.76	$100,000	III	
2002	Moon Queen (IRE)	4	Jerry D. Bailey	Christophe Clement	Joseph Allen	abt. 1 3/8 miles	2:18.38	$100,000	III	
2001	Innuendo (IRE)	6	Jerry D. Bailey	Christophe Clement	Gerald W. Leigh	1 3/8 miles	2:13.62	$100,000	III	
2000	My Sweet Westly	4	Pat Day	Dale L. Romans	Frank L. Jones, Jr	1 1/4 miles	2:06.79	$75,000	Listed	On dirt
1999	Delilah (IRE)	5	Jerry D. Bailey	Christophe Clement	Michael Ings	1 3/8 miles	2:13.45	$75,000	III	
1998	Shemozzle (IRE)	5	John R. Velazquez	Christophe Clement	Lord Hartington	abt. 1 3/8 miles	2:19.06	$75,000	III	
1997	Tocopilla (ARG)	7	Brian Dale Peck	Herbert Miller	Castle Rock Racing Stable	1 3/8 miles	2:14.35	$75,000	III	
1996	Electric Society (IRE)	5	Mike E. Smith	John C. Kimmel	Michel Jean Zerolo	1 3/8 miles	2:15.23	$50,000	III	
1995	P J Floral	6	Shane Sellers	Vincent L. Blengs	Gerald Robins & Jay Weiss	1 3/8 miles	2:14.44	$50,000	Listed	
1994	Russian Tango	4	Jerry D. Bailey	Mohammed Moubarak	Buckram Oak Farm	1 1/4 miles	2:02.58	$50,000	Listed	On dirt
1993	Fairy Garden	5	Wigberto S. Ramos	Roger L. Attfield	Virginia Kraft Payson	1 3/8 miles	2:14.67	$50,000	Listed	
1992	Bungalow	5	Shane Sellers	Harvey L. Vanier	Nancy A. Vanier	1 1/4 miles	2:05.79	$50,000	Listed	On dirt
1991	Rigamajig	5	Randy Romero	Richard A. DeStasio	Peter E. Blum	1 3/8 miles	2:15.10	$50,000	Listed	
1990	Storm of Glory	6	Jerry D. Bailey	Ronald Gaffney	M Cardoza & J Gallo	7 furlongs	1:25.00	$50,000		On dirt (Note: held 4 March 1990)
1989	Race not held									
1988	Race not held									
1987	First Prediction	5	Julio Molina Pezua	Janet Del Castillo	Janet Del Castillo	1 mile	1:35.20	$50,000		(Note: held 10 May 1987)

Legend:
Turf Dirt

== See also ==
List of American and Canadian Graded races
