= Special Eclipse Award =

The Special Eclipse Award is part of the Eclipse Award program in United States Thoroughbred horse racing. The Special Award's purpose is to honor outstanding individual achievements in, or contributions to, the sport. It is not awarded every year.

Honorees:

- 1971 : Robert J. Kleberg
- 1974 : Charles Hatton
- 1976 : Bill Shoemaker
- 1980 : John T. Landry/Pierre Bellocq
- 1984 : C.V. Whitney
- 1985 : Arlington Park
- 1987 : Anheuser-Busch
- 1988 : Edward J. DeBartolo Sr.
- 1989 : Richard L. Duchossois
- 1994 : Eddie Arcaro/Johnny Longden
- 1995 : Russell Baze
- 1998 : Oak Tree Racing Association
- 1999 : Laffit Pincay, Jr.
- 2000 : John Hettinger
- 2001 : Sheikh Mohammed Al Maktoum
- 2002 : Keeneland Library
- 2004 : Dale Baird
- 2005 : Cash Is King Racing Stable
- 2006 : Roy and Gretchen Jackson and the University of Pennsylvania School of Veterinary Medicine's George D. Widener Hospital for Large Animals at New Bolton Center
- 2007 : Kentucky Horse Park
- 2010 : Team Zenyatta
- 2011 : Rapid Redux
- 2013 : Thoroughbred Aftercare Alliance
- 2014 : Old Friends Farm
- 2017 : San Luis Rey Downs Camarero Racetrack Rescue and Response
- 2022 : Jay Privman
- 2023 : Tom Hammond
- 2024 : Frank Taylor and the Stable Recovery Program
- 2025 : Trevor Denman, Bob Duncan
