= What A Summer =

American-bred Thoroughbred racehorse

- Sire: What Luck
- Grandsire: Bold Ruler
- Dam: Summer Classic
- Damsire: Summer Tan
- Sex: Filly
- Foaled: 1973
- Country: United States
- Colour: Gray
- Breeder: Milton Polinger
- Owner: Diana M. Firestone
- Trainer: LeRoy Jolley
- Record: 31: 18-6-3
- Earnings: US$479,161

Major wins
- Black-Eyed Susan Stakes (1976); Anne Arundel Stakes (1976); Fall Highweight Handicap (1977 & 1978); Maskette Handicap (1977); Silver Spoon Handicap (1977 & 1978); Distaff Handicap (1977); First Flight Handicap (1978)

Awards
- American Champion Sprint Horse (1977)

Honours
- What A Summer Stakes at Laurel Park Racecourse named in her honor
- Last updated on June 14, 2011

What A Summer (foal in 1973) was an American Thoroughbred Champion racehorse who defeated both male and female competitors. She was bred in Maryland by Milton Polinger. She was a gray out of the mare Summer Classic who was sired by Summer Tan. Her sire was What Luck, a multiple stakes winning son of U.S. Racing Hall of Fame inductee Bold Ruler. What A Summer is probably best remembered for her win in the Grade II $65,000 Black-Eyed Susan Stakes over stakes winners Dearly Precious and Artfully on May 14, 1976.

== Two-year-old season ==
What A Summer was trained very early in her career by Hall of Fame conditioner Bud Delp while racing for her breeder, Milton Polinger. She was bought by Mrs. Bertram Firestone following Polinger's death in the early fall of 1976. That death delayed her the first start of her career until late in the year. Mrs. Firestone turned the mare over to trainer LeRoy Jolley. What A Summer did not start racing until near the end of her two-year-old season, when she broke her maiden at Philadelphia Park. Near the end of the year, she won an allowance race. She ended the year with two wins in four starts.

== Three-year-old season ==
In January, What A Summer placed second in her first stakes race, the $25,000 Heirloom Stakes at the old Liberty Bell Race Track in Philadelphia. Two months later, she won her second allowance race over winners and convinced her connections that she was ready to step up in class and take on stakes winners in the Grade II $65,000 Black-Eyed Susan Stakes. In that race, she withstood a fast closing challenge down the stretch to hold off a late charge by 4:5 favorite Dearly Precious in a final time of 1:42.40 for the mile and one sixteenth on the dirt track at Pimlico Race Course in Baltimore, Maryland. Her jockey, Chris McCarron, was credited with a solid ride by conserving energy with moderate fractions in the middle portion of the race. Stakes winner Artfully held on for third in the field of ten three-year-old fillies. In December 1976, What A Summer won the $50,000 Anne Arundel Stakes at Laurel Park Racecourse, beating Turn the Guns and Avum in 1:38.20 for the mile under McCarron.

== Four-year-old season ==
In 1977, What A Summer won the $75,000 Fall Highweight Handicap twice, carrying the high weight of 134 pounds under jockey Jacinto Vásquez. The Fall Highweight is run in November of each year at Aqueduct Racetrack. In the 1977 race, she finished in a time of 1:09.4 and she broke the stakes record for six furlongs. That year, she also won the $40,000 Silver Spoon Handicap, the $50,000 Maskette Handicap and the $35,000 Distaff Handicap. She placed second in the grade one Beldame Stakes at Belmont Park and showed in both the $40,000 Grey Flight Handicap and the $25,000 Regret Stakes.

== Five-year-old season ==
In 1978 as a five-year-old, What A Summer repeated two of her victories from the year before in both the Fall Highweight Handicap, under Hall of Fame jockey Ángel Cordero Jr., and the $40,000 Silver Spoon Handicap. She also won the $40,000 First Flight Handicap. She placed second in the grade two Vosburgh Stakes, the grade three Vagrancy Handicap, the Sport Page Handicap, the Suwanee River Handicap and the Egret Handicap.

== Honors ==
What A Summer was named Maryland-bred horse of the year in 1977 and twice was named champion older mare for the state of Maryland in both 1977 and 1978. She was retired in 1978 and as a broodmare she produced several graded stakes winners. After her retirement, Laurel Park Racecourse named a race in honor, the What A Summer Stakes. She was an Eclipse Award winner and was named American Champion Sprint Horse in 1977.

What A Summer ended her career with a record of 18 wins out of 31 starts in her career. Her most memorable race was perhaps her dominating performance in the de facto second leg of the filly Triple Crown, the Black-Eyed Susan Stakes. In addition to her 18 wins, she placed nine times with earnings of $479,161. That record of 27 first or second finishes in 31 starts at 87% is among the best in history.
