= Silmaril (horse) =

American-bred Thoroughbred racehorse

- Sire: Diamond
- Grandsire: Mr. Prospector
- Dam: Kattebuck
- Damsire: Spend A Buck
- Sex: Mare
- Foaled: 2001
- Country: United States
- Colour: Dark Brown
- Breeder: Stephen E. Quick; Christopher J. Feifarek
- Owner: Stephen E. Quick & Christopher J. Feifarek
- Trainer: Chris Grove
- Record: 36: 16-7-3
- Earnings: $1,032,973

Major wins
- Maryland Million Oaks (2004); Geisha Handicap (2004); Jameela Stakes (2004); Pimlico Breeders' Cup Distaff Handicap (2005); Northview Stallion Station Stakes (2005); Nellie Morse Stakes (2005); Maryland Million Distaff Handicap (2006); Endine Handicap (2007); What A Summer Stakes (2007, 2008); Conniver Stakes (2007)

Silmaril (foaled March 31, 2001 in Maryland) is an American thoroughbred mare racehorse. She is sired by stakes winner, Diamond, who in turn was sired by leading North American sire, Mr. Prospector. She was out of the mare, Kattebuck, whose sire was the 1985 United States Horse of the Year, Spend A Buck.

Silmaril raced a total of 36 times, mostly in Maryland. She won 16 races, 11 of them stakes races. Silmaril is probably best known for defeating the Eclipse award winning filly, Ashado twice, once in the grade two Pimlico Breeders' Cup Distaff Handicap (now called Allaire duPont Distaff Stakes) in 2005 and in the What A Summer Stakes in 2007. Ashado went on to become North America's second leading mare in career earnings with almost $4,000,000.

Silmaril was also a very popular mare at Laurel Park Racecourse and throughout Maryland. She won two different races on Maryland Million Day, both the Maryland Million Oaks in 2004 as a three-year-old and the Maryland Million Distaff Handicap in 2006 as a five-year-old.

Named for the "great jewels" of the J.R.R. Tolkien tales, Silmaril is one of only five Maryland-bred mares to ever reach the million dollar mark in total earnings on the racetrack. She was retired back to her owners' breeding facilities in Maryland on January 12, 2008.
