= 1995 Preakness Stakes =

120th running of the Preakness Stakes

120th Preakness Stakes
- The Preakness Stakes
- "The Middle Jewel of the Triple Crown" "The Run for the Black-Eyed Susans"
- Location: Pimlico Race Course, Baltimore, Maryland, United States
- Date: May 20, 1995
- Winning horse: Timber Country
- Jockey: Pat Day
- Trainer: D. Wayne Lukas
- Conditions: Fast
- Surface: Dirt

The 1995 Preakness Stakes was the 120th running of the Preakness Stakes thoroughbred horse race. The race took place on May 20, 1995, and was televised in the United States on the ABC television network. Timber Country, who was jockeyed by Pat Day, won the race by a half length over runner-up Oliver's Twist. Approximate post time was 5:33 p.m. Eastern Time. The race was run over a fast track in a final time of 1:54-2/5. The Maryland Jockey Club reported total attendance of 100,818, this is recorded as second highest on the list of American thoroughbred racing top attended events for North America in 1995. This was the first time in history that Preakness attendance exceeded 100,000.

== Payout ==
The 120th Preakness Stakes Payout Schedule

| Program Number | Horse Name | Win | Place | Show |
|---|---|---|---|---|
| 7 | Timber Country | $5.80 | $4.20 | $2.80 |
| 10 | Oliver's Twist | - | $16.80 | $6.40 |
| 11 | Thunder Gulch | - | - | $3.60 |

$2 Exacta: (7–10) paid $266.00

$2 Trifecta: (7–10–11) paid $909.60

== The full chart ==
| Finish Position | Margin (lengths) | Post Position | Horse name | Jockey | Trainer | Owner | Post Time Odds | Purse Earnings |
|---|---|---|---|---|---|---|---|---|
| 1st | 0 | 7 | Timber Country | Pat Day | D. Wayne Lukas | Overbrook Farms | 1.90-1 favorite | $650,000 |
| 2nd | 1/2 | 10 | Oliver's Twist | Alberto Delgado | J. William Boniface | Charles M. Oliver | 25.20-1 | $200,000 |
| 3rd | 3/4 | 11 | Thunder Gulch | Gary Stevens | D. Wayne Lukas | Michael Tabor | 3.80-1 | $100,000 |
| 4th | 4 3/4 | 8 | Star Standard | Chris McCarron | Nick Zito | William J. Condren | 29.50-1 | $50,000 |
| 5th | 5-1/4 | 9 | Mecke | Robbie Davis | Emanuel Tortora | James F. Lewis, Jr. | 28.60-1 | |
| 6th | 5 3/4 | 4 | Talkin Man | Mike E. Smith | Roger Attfield | Kinghaven Farms | 3.20-1 | |
| 7th | 11 1/2 | 10 | Our Gatsby | Kent Desormeaux | Donnie K. Von Hemel | Charles F. Heider | 10.90-1 | |
| 8th | 11 3/4 | 3 | Mystery Storm | Craig Perret | Larry R. Robideaux | David Beard | 25.00-1 | |
| 9th | 20 3/4 | 9 | Tejano Run | Jerry Bailey | Kenneth G. McPeek | Roy K. Monroe | 4.70-1 | |
| 10th | 23 1/2 | 6 | Pana Brass | Eddie Maple | Alfredo Callejas | Robert Perez | 64.30-1 | |
| 11th | 40 1/2 | 1 | Itron | Ricky L. Frazier | Roy C. Frazier | David Albert | 81.00-1 | |

- Winning Breeder: Lewquest, Ltd.; (KY)
- Final Time: 1:54 2/5
- Track Condition: Fast
- Total Attendance: 100,818

== See also ==
- 1995 Kentucky Derby
