= Oliver's Twist (horse) =

American-bred Thoroughbred racehorse

- Sire: Horatius
- Grandsire: Proudest Roman
- Dam: Heartful Star
- Damsire: Star de Naskra
- Sex: Stallion
- Foaled: 1992
- Country: United States
- Colour: Dark Brown
- Breeder: Country Life Farm
- Owner: Charles Oliver
- Trainer: J. William Boniface
- Record: 20: 5-6-1
- Earnings: $508,915

Major wins
- Federico Tesio Stakes (1995); Maryland Juvenile Championship Stakes (1994); Rollicking Stakes (1995); American Classic Race placing: Preakness Stakes 2nd (1995)

Honours
- Colorado Leading Sire (2006, 2007)
- Last updated on September 21, 2009

Oliver's Twist (foaled in Maryland in April 1992) was an American Thoroughbred racehorse. A descendant of Star de Naskra, he was sired by Horatius and bred by Country Life Farm. Oliver's Twist was a multiple graded stakes winner most remembered for finishing second in the 1995 Preakness Stakes.

== Two-year-old season ==
Oliver's Twist broke his maiden during his third start in the summer of 1994. He moved on to allowance company and won later that summer. His trainer then ran him against Maryland-bred stakes company in the autumn. At Laurel Park Racecourse, Oliver's Twist won the Maryland Juvenile Championship Stakes.

== Three-year-old season ==
Trained by local Marylander J. William Boniface, Oliver's Twist won three of four races in the spring of his sophomore season. After being freshened during the winter, he won an allowance race. He then won the Rollicking Stakes at Laurel Park. His next stop was what locals in Maryland call the "Preakness Trial": the grade three Federico Tesio Stakes at Pimlico Race Course. In the Tesio, he beat a field of local horses and New York shippers.

Boniface and owner Charles Oliver then entered Oliver's Twist in the 1995 Preakness Stakes to take on an r field of eleven stakes winners. Oliver's Twist was the third longest shot in the field at post time at 12-,1 ahead of only Pana Brass and Itron. Four of the five top Derby finishers came back to run in the Preakness. As expected Thunder Gulch, Tejano Run, Timber Country and Mecke took most of the public support at the windows. As the Preakness began, speedster Star Standard shot to the lead, followed by Mystery Storm and Talkin Man. Oliver's Twist saved ground along the rail and settled in fifth. Under jockey Alberto Delgado, he split the leaders, cleared traffic, and engaged Derby winner Thunder Gulch. However, Timber Country won by 1 1/2 lengths. Oliver's Twist outdueled Thunder Gulch for second place and $100,000 in prize money.

== Retirement ==
Oliver's Twist is standing at Menoken Farms in Montrose, Colorado.

In 2006 and 2007, Oliver's Twist was Colorado's leading sire in terms of both progeny earnings and number of winners.
