= Beautiful Pleasure =

American-bred Thoroughbred racehorse

- Sire: Maudlin
- Grandsire: Foolish Pleasure
- Dam: Beautiful Bid
- Damsire: Baldski
- Sex: Mare
- Foaled: 1995
- Country: United States
- Color: Bay
- Breeder: Farnsworth Farms (Mike Sherman)
- Owner: John C. Oxley
- Trainer: John T. Ward Jr.
- Record: 25:10-5-2
- Earnings: US$2,734,078

Major wins
- Matron Stakes (1997); Beldame Stakes (1999); Personal Ensign Handicap (1999, 2000); Hempstead Handicap (2000); Shuvee Handicap (2000) Breeders' Cup wins: Breeders' Cup Distaff (1999)

Awards
- American Champion Older Female Horse (1999)

Beautiful Pleasure (March 31, 1995 – August 11, 2011) was an American Thoroughbred Champion racehorse who won the 1999 Breeders' Cup Distaff and was voted that year's American Champion Older Female Horse.

Bred in Florida by Farnsworth Farms, winner of the 1996 Eclipse Award for Outstanding Breeder, Beautiful Pleasure was sired by multiple stakes winner Maudlin, a son of 1975 Kentucky Derby winner and U.S. Racing Hall of Fame inductee, Foolish Pleasure. She was and out of the mare Beautiful Bid, a daughter of Baldski who was a son of the 1970 English Triple Crown winner, Nijinsky. She was a full sister to the speedy Mecke, a multiple Grade 1 stakes winner in track/course record times on both dirt and turf racing surfaces.

Beautiful Pleasure was sold to John Oxley for $480,000 by Farnsworth Farms through the April 1997 Keeneland sale for two-year-olds in training.

== Racing career ==
Trained by John Ward Jr., she was a winner of six Grade I races at age two, four, and five, three of which came during her 1999, Championship season.

== Broodmare ==
When her racing career was over, Beautiful Pleasure served as a broodmare for owner John Oxley's Fawn Leap Farm near Midway, Kentucky. The most successful of her foals to race was Dr. Pleasure, sired by the 1995 Kentucky Derby and Belmont Stakes winner, Thunder Gulch.

Suffering from chronic laminitis, Beautiful Pleasure was humanely euthanized on August 11, 2011.

Pedigree of Beautiful Pleasure
Sire Maudlin	Foolish Pleasure	What A Pleasure	Bold Ruler
Sire Maudlin	Foolish Pleasure	What A Pleasure	Grey Flight
Sire Maudlin	Foolish Pleasure	Fool-Me-Not	Tom Fool
Sire Maudlin	Foolish Pleasure	Fool-Me-Not	Cuadrilla
Sire Maudlin	Zonta	Dr. Fager	Rough'n Tumble
Sire Maudlin	Zonta	Dr. Fager	Aspidistra
Sire Maudlin	Zonta	Santa Tina	Santa Claus
Sire Maudlin	Zonta	Santa Tina	Reine des Bois
Dam Beautiful Bid	Baldski	Nijinsky	Northern Dancer
Dam Beautiful Bid	Baldski	Nijinsky	Flaming Page
Dam Beautiful Bid	Baldski	Too Bald	Bald Eagle
Dam Beautiful Bid	Baldski	Too Bald	Hidden Talent
Dam Beautiful Bid	Biddy Big	Palestinian	Sun Again
Dam Beautiful Bid	Biddy Big	Palestinian	Dolly Whisk
Dam Beautiful Bid	Biddy Big	Spoony	Devil Diver
Dam Beautiful Bid	Biddy Big	Spoony	Bimlette
