= Federico Tesio Stakes top three finishers =

This is a listing of the horses that finished in either first, second, or third place and the number of starters in The Federico Tesio Stakes, an American stakes race for three-year-olds at 1-1/8 miles on dirt held at either Laurel Park in Laurel, Maryland or Pimlico Race Course in Baltimore, Maryland. (List 1973-present)

Year	Winner	Second	Third	Starters
2026	Taj Mahal	Wild Warrior	Let’s Go Lando	10
2025	Pay Billy	Just a Fair Shake	Surfside Moon	9
2024	Copper Tax	Speedyness	Inveigled	10
2023	Perform	Nintypercentmaddie	Summer Cause	9
2022	Joe	Mr Jefferson	Shake Em Loose	9
2021	The Reds	Excellorator	Royal Number	8
2020	Happy Saver	Monday Morning Qb	Big City Bob	6
2019	Alwaysmining	Trifor Gold	Bozzini	5
2018	Diamond King	Holland Park	Noble Commander	9
2017	Twisted Tom	O Dionysus	Action Everyday	5
2016	Awesome Speed	Governor Malibu	I came to Party	7
2015	Bodhisattva	Noteworthy Peach	All Hands	7
2014	Kid Cruz	Matuszak	Joint Custody	9
2013	Abstraction	Heat Press	Rienzi	9
2012	Pretension	Brimstone Island	My Adonis	6
2011	Concealed Identity	Ruler on Ice	J W Blue	7
2010	Bank the Eight	Regal Warrior	London Lane	5
2009	Miner's Escape	Hehasnosay	Tone It Down	8
2008	Icabad Crane	Mint Lane	Deputyville	8
2007	Xchanger	Pink Viper	Zephyr Cat	n/a
2006	Ah Day	Vegas Play	Putonyerdancinshuz	n/a
2005	Malibu Moonshine	Hello Jerry	Byanosejoe	n/a
2004	Water Cannon	Pawyne Princess	Irish Laddie	n/a
2003	Cherokee's Boy	Penobscot Bay	High Watermark	n/a
2002	Smoked Em	Magic Weisner	Heir D'Twine	n/a
2001	Marciano	Talk Is Money	Burning Roma	n/a
2000	Runspastum	Grundlefoot	Inner Harbour	n/a
1999	Talk's Cheap	Stellar Brush	Millions	n/a
1998	Thomas Jo	Medford	Monk's Falcon	n/a
1997	Concerto	Bleu Madura	Dr. Best	n/a
1996	Tour's Big Red	Connecting Terms	Mixed Counts	n/a
1995	Oliver's Twist	Western Echo	Flying Punch	n/a
1994	Silver Profile	Takeitlikeaman	Honorable Flight	n/a
1993	Woods of Windsor	Dynamic Brush	Raglan Road	n/a
1992	Speakerphone	Berkley Fitz	Ameri Valay	n/a
1991	Tong Po	He Is Risen	A Call to Rise	n/a
1990	Smelly	J. R.'s Horizon	Flying Feet	n/a
1989	Rock Point	Wind Splitter	Doc's Leader	n/a
1988	Private Terms	Michael Josh	Royal Legend	n/a
1987	Rolls Aly	Templar Hill	Restless Noble	n/a
1986	Broad Brush	Fobby Forbes	Double Feint	n/a
1985	Sparrowvon	Bea Quality	Joyfull John	n/a
1984	Fourmatt	D. White	Spitalfields	n/a
1983	Deputed Testamony	Dixieland Band	Island Champ	n/a
1982	Hush Hush Hush	Count Disco	Dance Pavilion	n/a
1981	Boston Tea	Rowdy Rudy	Fat Man	n/a

== See also ==
- Federico Tesio Stakes
- Pimlico Race Course
- List of graded stakes at Pimlico Race Course
