= Better Talk Now =

American Thoroughbred racehorse

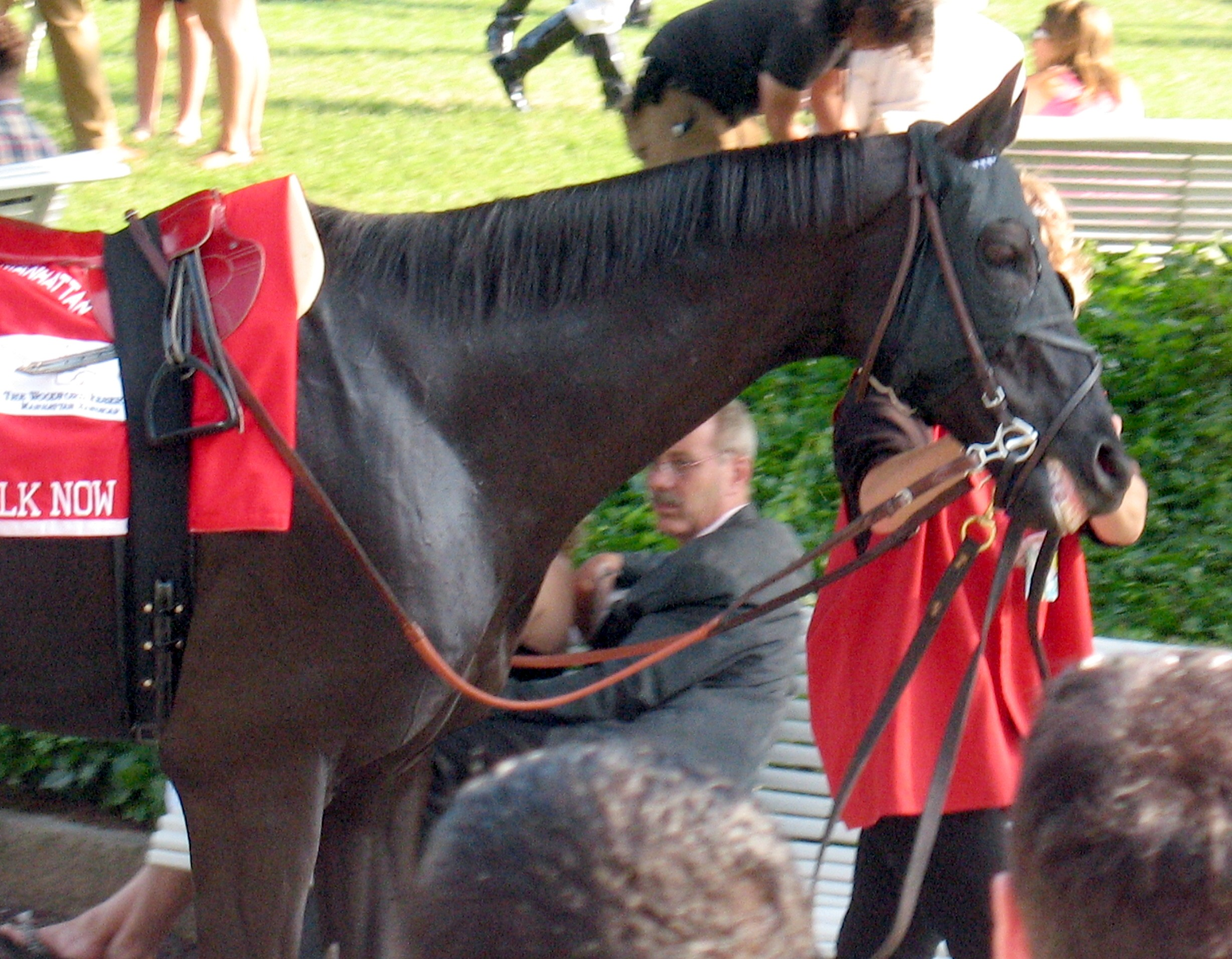
- Better Talk Now in the paddock prior to the 2008 Manhattan Handicap
- Sire: Talkin Man
- Grandsire: With Approval
- Dam: Bendita
- Damsire: Baldski
- Sex: Gelding
- Foaled: February 25, 1999
- Died: June 27, 2017 (aged 18)
- Country: United States
- Colour: Dark Bay
- Breeder: Wimborne Farm, Inc.
- Owner: Bushwood Racing Partners LLC
- Trainer: H. Graham Motion
- Record: 51: 14-8-5
- Earnings: $4,356,664

Major wins
- Knickerbocker Handicap (2003); Sword Dancer Invitational Handicap (2004); Fort Marcy Handicap (2005); United Nations Handicap (2005); Man o' War Stakes (2005); Dixie Stakes (2006); Sky Classic Stakes (2006); Manhattan Handicap (2007) Breeders' Cup wins: Breeders' Cup Turf (2004)

Better Talk Now (February 25, 1999 – June 27, 2017) was an American Thoroughbred racehorse best known for winning the Breeders' Cup Turf in 2004. His racing career stretched over nine seasons, during which he won 14 times, five of them Grade I stakes, with earnings of over $4.3 million.

== Background ==
Better Talk Now was a nearly black gelding bred in Kentucky by Wimborne Farm. His sire Talkin Man, the 1994 Canadian Champion Two-Year-Old Colt, was in turn sired by With Approval, the 1989 Canadian Triple Crown Champion and a Canadian Horse Racing Hall of Fame inductee. Better Talk Now was out of the stakes-placed mare Bendita, by Baldski, a son of English Triple Crown Champion Nijinsky. Bendita is from the family of Folle Nuit, which also includes major winners Stage Door Johnny, Vision d'Etat and Shaamit.

As a weanling, Better Talk Now failed to meet his reserve at the Keenland November 1999 Sale of Breeding Stock. He originally raced for Wimborne Farm and was trained by Diane Perkins. In mid 2002 just after his first win, he was privately purchased by Bushwood Racing Partners, consisting of Brent Johnson, Karl Barth, and Chris Dwyer, who transferred him to trainer Graham Motion.

Better Talk Now, nicknamed "Blackie", spent most of the rest of his life at Motion's Herringswell Stables, part of the Fair Hill Training Center in Maryland. Jockey Ramon Dominguez, who rode him in many of his biggest races, described him as "very consistent but also a problem child" as he could be obstinate and aggressive, and tended to "lug in" (move towards the rail instead of maintaining a straight path).

== Racing career ==
Better Talk Now made only one start at age two, finishing a badly beaten tenth in a 7-furlong maiden special weight on the dirt at Keeneland on October 21, 2001. He returned on April 7 in a similar race at Keeneland, finishing sixth. After a brief layoff, he finished second in two races at Churchill Downs in June, both at 1 1/16 miles on the dirt. On July 6, he was switched to turf and responded with a nine-length win. Moved to the barn of trainer Graham Motion, Better Talk Now made five more starts at age three, winning two allowance races. He finished a distant sixth in his first graded stakes effort, the Saranac Handicap.

At age four, Better Talk Now continued to improve, winning three of seven races with one second and two third-place finishes. On January 18, 2003, he won an allowance race at Gulfstream Park by a neck. That summer, he won the Eight Thirty Stakes at Delaware Park by a neck and then was beaten by a neck in the Arlington Handicap. Motion blamed the loss on the horse's tendency to lug in during the stretch run, and he subsequently fitted Better Talk Now with a full cup blinker over his left eye. He responded by earning his first graded stakes race win on November 1, capturing the Knickerbocker Handicap at New York's Aqueduct Racetrack and earning a Beyer Speed Figure of 101.

=== 2004 ===
At age five, he developed into a high-quality, if inconsistent, turf horse, especially in races run at 1 1/2 miles. His first two starts were not promising as he finished eighth in the John B. Connally Breeders' Cup Turf Handicap on April 10, 2004, and ninth in the Dixie Stakes on May 15. On June 12, he improved to finish second in the Battlefield Stakes, followed by another second in the Bowling Green Handicap on July 17.

On August 14, he had a breakthrough performance in the Grade I Sword Dancer Invitational Handicap at a distance of 1 1/2 miles over a yielding turf course at Saratoga. The favorite, Balto Star, went to the early lead and set moderate fractions for the first mile, then was passed in the stretch by Request For Parole. Better Talk Now saved ground early in the race, then swung wide in the stretch and accelerated rapidly, winning by 1 1/2 lengths. "I felt like I had a lot of horse," said Dominguez, "but once you get them out, you never know if they're going to respond. When I got him out, he responded so nicely." Better Talk Now earned a Beyer Speed Figure of 106.

He was next entered in the Man o' War Stakes at Belmont on September 11, where he finished fourth behind Magistretti. In part due to that loss, he was dismissed at odds of 28-1 in the Breeders' Cup Turf, held that year at Lone Star Park on October 30. Because of the expected heat and the tight turns of Lone Star's turf course, most European horses bypassed the event. The only European entry was Powerscourt, who had been disqualified after winning the Arlington Million. The heavy favorite was Kitten's Joy, who had won six of his seven starts during 2004 including the Secretariat Stakes and Joe Hirsch Turf Classic.

Over a yielding turf course, Star Over the Bay went to the early lead with Kitten's Joy tracking in third and Better Talk Now near the back of the pack. With a half mile remaining, Powerscourt made his move while Star Over the Bay started to tire, eventually finishing last. Looking for racing room at the top of the stretch, Kitten's Joy swung out just as Better Talk Now was starting his run on the outside of the field. Kitten's Joy checked sharply due to a lack of racing room, and his jockey later claimed foul, saying contact between the two horses caused Kitten's Joy to lose momentum. Regardless, Better Talk Now continued with a powerful run down the stretch, then started to drift in, brushing with Powerscourt as he moved to the lead. Better Talk Now won by 1 3/4 lengths over a late-finishing Kitten's Joy, with Powerscourt in third.

After an inquiry, the stewards allowed the result to stand. "Even though the betting public could see there were some problems there, we felt that (Better Talk Now) was obviously going to win the race, and it didn't really affect the placing of the horses," explained Chuck Nuber, one of Lone Star's three stewards. "(Kitten's Joy) comes on and finishes second, about the best that it was going to finish. It was a little rough, but it was the correct order of finish."

The win was the first in a Breeders' Cup race for Johnson, Motion and Dominguez. Better Talk Now earned a career-high Beyer Speed Figure of 111 for the win.

Motion felt that Better Talk Now would have a chance at winning an Eclipse Award if he won another Grade I race, especially as he had beaten the eventual champion turf horse Kitten's Joy head-to-head. Accordingly, he entered Better Talk Now in the Hollywood Turf Cup on December 4. However, the pace was slow, and Dominguez had trouble settling the horse. On the final turn, Better Talk Now became rank and pulled his way to the lead while racing extremely wide, then tired in the stretch to finish sixth.

=== 2005 ===
Better Talk Now made the first start of his six-year-old campaign on April 23, 2005, in the Fort Marcy Handicap at Aqueduct. He raced in last place for the first half mile, then started closing ground on the leaders around the far turn. In the stretch, he dueled with Remind, who was carrying six fewer pounds, and prevailed by a neck.

After a fourth-place finish in the Dixie Stakes, Better Talk Now raced in the Grade I United Nations Stakes on July 2. Motion also entered Shake the Bank as a "rabbit" to ensure a fast pace. Shake the Bank led until mid-stretch, when he was caught by Silverfoot. Meanwhile, Better Talk Now was trapped behind a wall of horses until a gap opened on the rail. He accelerated through and pulled away to win by three-quarters of a length over Silverfoot. "I was thrilled that it really worked out," said Motion. "I got a little nervous at the quarter-pole when it looked like the rabbit would keep going. But our plan couldn't have worked out any better. Ramon rode a great race."

For his next start, Motion originally planned to have Better Talk Now defend his win in the 2004 Sword Dancer but decided instead to enter the Arlington Million on August 13. Better Talk Now finished fourth, well beaten by Powerscourt but in a tight finish for second with Kitten's Joy. "He was not very aggressive like he usually is," said jockey John Velazquez, substituting for Dominguez. "I don't know what it was but he was not his usual self. I got to the quarter pole and I thought I had every chance to win it, and he just kind of flattened out a bit."

On September 10, Better Talk Now was entered in the Man o' War Stakes at Belmont Park. Reunited with Dominguez, he was the lukewarm 3-1 favorite in a competitive field that included King's Drama (winner of the Sword Dancer), Angara (winner Beverly D), and Relaxed Gesture (second in his last three starts). Better Talk Now settled near the back of the pack for the first mile, then mounted a strong run down the stretch to win by a neck over King's Drama.

Better Talk Now ended the season by finishing seventh in the Breeders' Cup Turf and twelfth in the Japan Cup.

=== 2006-2009 ===
Back on the track in 2006, Better Talk Now won the Dixie Stakes at Pimlico Race Course and the Sky Classic Stakes in a three-way photo finish at Woodbine Racetrack before finishing a very close second in his third Breeders' Cup Turf appearance.

In his first start of 2007, the eight-year-old gelding finished fourth in the Turf Classic Stakes at Churchill Downs after having to check his stride near the finish line. He then won the Grade I Manhattan Handicap by a head over English Channel, despite a slow pace and heavy traffic. "It's hard to believe but this horse is getting better," said Motion. "He's more settled and more relaxed. He really shouldn't have been able to close like that into those fractions. He is an unbelievable horse. Ramon rode him beautifully today; he has so much confidence in him. I don't think people gave this horse enough credit for his race at Churchill. He got completely knocked off his feet the last sixteenth."

In the ensuing United Nations Stakes in July, English Channel came out on top with Better Talk Now taking third place. An injury to his left front ankle became infected, and resulting soreness kept him out of racing until he ran fourth in October's Breeders' Cup Turf. Better Talk Now had been reluctant to load in the gate, prompting questions about whether he would be retired. "He did behave badly," said Motion, "and they actually had to push him onto the turf course, but he did the same thing the day he ran and won at Lone Star. If he wasn't like that, he wouldn’t be the horse he is."

Better Talk Now was winless in seven starts in 2008 but finished third in the Man o' War and second in the Sword Dancer. In his fifth appearance in the Breeders' Cup Turf, he finished eighth.

Better Talk Now began his 10-year-old season with a sixth-place finish in the Elkhorn Stakes on April 24, 2009, before finishing third in the Manhattan Handicap on June 6. He then finished second in the Sword Dancer Invitational Handicap at Saratoga in August. He was scheduled to start in the Joe Hirsch Turf Classic on October 3, but was retired on September 29 after injuring the suspensory ligament in his left hind leg.

Better Talk Now made 51 starts, finishing with 14 wins and 27 in-the-money finishes and career earnings of $4,356,664. He started in 41 stakes races, including 24 grade I races. He finished either first or second in at least one Grade I stakes race each year from 2004 to 2009.

== Retirement and legacy ==
Better Talk Now was retired in 2009 to Herringswell Stables in Fair Hill, Maryland where he enjoyed meeting some of his loyal followers. In 2011, he developed a gastrointestinal problem, thought to be due to botulism, that interfered with the normal function of his esophagus and small intestine. He was successfully treated at the New Bolton Center, part of the University of Pennsylvania School of Veterinary Medicine. In 2017, he underwent colic surgery at New Bolton on June 7 and then underwent a second surgery June 15. He was euthanized late June 27 due to complications from the colic surgery.

In 2014, Saratoga Race Course founded the Better Talk Now Stakes, a race named in his honor. A listed stakes on turf, the race is for three-year-old males and carries a purse of $100,000.

== Pedigree ==
Pedigree of Better Talk Now, dark bay gelding, February 25, 1999
Sire Talkin Man 1992	With Approval; 1986	Caro (IRE)	Fortino (FR)
Sire Talkin Man 1992	With Approval; 1986	Caro (IRE)	Chambord (GB)
Sire Talkin Man 1992	With Approval; 1986	Passing Mood	Buckpasser
Sire Talkin Man 1992	With Approval; 1986	Passing Mood	Cool Mood
Sire Talkin Man 1992	Pookette; 1986	Miswaki	Mr. Prospector
Sire Talkin Man 1992	Pookette; 1986	Miswaki	Hopespringseternal
Sire Talkin Man 1992	Pookette; 1986	Pensioner	Irish Stronghold
Sire Talkin Man 1992	Pookette; 1986	Pensioner	Stone Cottage
Dam Bendita 1985	Baldski; 1974	Nijinsky	Northern Dancer
Dam Bendita 1985	Baldski; 1974	Nijinsky	Flaming Page
Dam Bendita 1985	Baldski; 1974	Too Bald	Bald Eagle
Dam Bendita 1985	Baldski; 1974	Too Bald	Hidden Talent
Dam Bendita 1985	Bonne Note (FR); 1972	Bon Mot (FR)	Worden (FR)
Dam Bendita 1985	Bonne Note (FR); 1972	Bon Mot (FR)	Djebel IRA (FR)
Dam Bendita 1985	Bonne Note (FR); 1972	Mandolina (FR)	Ocarina (FR)
Dam Bendita 1985	Bonne Note (FR); 1972	Mandolina (FR)	Folle Nuit (family: 1-L)

Better Talk Now is inbred 5 × 4 to Northern Dancer, meaning Northern Dancer appears once in the fifth generation of his pedigree and once in the fourth generation.
