= Find Handicap =

American Thoroughbred horse race

Find Stakes
- Class: Ungraded Stakes
- Location: Laurel Park Racecourse, Laurel, Maryland, United States
- Inaugurated: 1978
- Race type: Thoroughbred - Flat racing
- Website: www.laurelpark.com

Race information
- Distance: 1 1/8 miles (9 furlongs)
- Surface: Turf
- Track: Left-handed
- Qualification: Three-years-old & up
- Weight: Assigned
- Purse: $60,000

The Find Handicap is an American Thoroughbred horse race run annually at Maryland's Laurel Park Racecourse. It is open to horses ages three and older and is contested on turf over a distance of one and one eighth miles.

The race is named in honor of Find, who ranked as Maryland's all-time money winner from 1950 through 1982, when he was surpassed by Jameela. Find was a durable gelding owned by Alfred Gwynne Vanderbilt who earned $803,615 over eight years racing. He started in 110 races, winning 22 times with 27 seconds and 27 third-place finishes. He won or placed in 51 stakes races.

Find was born and raised at venerable Sagamore Farm in Glyndon, Maryland. He was born in the same foal crop of 1950 at Sagamore that produced Vanderbilt-bred stakes winners Native Dancer and Social Outcast. Find was retired from racing and pensioned at Sagamore Farm, where he lived out his days as a companion for the farm's barren and maiden mares until his death in 1979 at the age of 29.

The race was inaugurated and run for the seven times at Maryland State Fair from 1978 through 1984 at only 6 1/2 furlongs on the main dirt track. The race was also taken off the turf in 1993, 1994, 2000 and 2004 due to the condition of the turf as a result of inclement weather.

== Records ==
Speed record:

- 1 1/8 miles - 1:46.00 - Le Reine's Terms (2002)
- 6 1/2 furlongs - 1:17.00 - Happy Chef (1984)

Most wins by a jockey:

- 3 - Mario Pino (1988, 1999 & 2005)
- 3 - Heratio A. Karamanos (2002, 2003 & 2006)

Most wins by a trainer:

- 5 - Lawrence E. Murray (1993, 2001, 2002, 2003 & 2004)

== Winners of the Find Handicap since 1978 ==
Year	Winner	Jockey	Trainer	Owner	Dist.	Time	Purse	Gr.
2015	Plash Phelps	Victor Carrasco	Rodney Jenkins	Hillwood Stables	1-1/8	1:49.11	$60,000	
2014	No Race	No Race	No Race	No Race	no race	0:00.00	no race	
2013	No Race	No Race	No Race	No Race	no race	0:00.00	no race	
2012	No Race	No Race	No Race	No Race	no race	0:00.00	no race	
2011	Concealed Identity	Sheldon Russell	Edmond Gaudet	Linda Gaudet/ Morris Bailey	1-1/8	1:53.51	$60,000	
2010	Ben's Cat	Julian Pimentel	King T. Leatherbury	The Jim Stable	1-1/8	1:52.20	$50,000	
2009	Sarto	Joe Rocco Jr.	Edwin Merryman	Mathew Moran	1-1/8	1:51.04	$50,000	
2008	Headsandtales	Erick Rodriguez	Dale Capuano	Skeedattle Associates	1-1/8	1:48.06	$50,000	
2007	Headsandtales	Jonathan Joyce	Robin L. Graham	Skeedattle Associates	1-1/8	1:49.80	$50,000	
2006	Private Scandal	Haratio A. Karamanos	Peter Bazeos	Ioannis Korologos	1-1/8	1:49.40	$75,000	
2005	Private Scandal	Mario Pino	Gary Sciacca	Ioannis Korologos	1-1/8	1:49.00	$75,000	
2004	Foufa's Warrior	Steve Hamilton	Lawrence E. Murray	Sondra & Howard Bender	1-1/8	1:50.00	$75,000	
2003	Certantee	Haratio A. Karamanos	Lawrence E. Murray		1-1/8	1:52.00	$75,000	
2002	La Reine's Terms	Haratio A. Karamanos	Lawrence E. Murray	Sondra & Howard Bender	1-1/8	1:46.00	$75,000	
2001	La Reine's Terms	Larry Reynolds	Lawrence E. Murray	Sondra & Howard Bender	1-1/8	1:50.00	$75,000	
2000	Crosspatch	Nik Goodwin	Berkley W. Kern, Jr.		1-1/8	1:50.20	$75,000	
1999	Cynics Beware	Mario Pino	Mary Welby McGill		1-1/8	1:48.40	$75,000	
1998	Winsox	Robert Colton	J. William Boniface		1-1/8	1:50.00	$75,000	
1997	Warning Glance	Mark Johnston	Charles H. Hadry		1-1/8	1:48.80	$75,000	
1996	Ops Smile	Edgar Prado	J. William Boniface	Bonita Farm & Lynn Brown	1-1/8	1:49.20	$75,000	
1995	Warning Glance	Mark Johnston	Charles H. Hadry		1-1/8	1:49.20	$75,000	
1994	Jest Punching	Omar Clinger	Gary Capuano		1-1/8	1:51.20	$75,000	
1993	Maryland Moon	Larry Reynolds	Lawrence E. Murray		1-1/8	1:49.80	$75,000	
1992	Gala Spinaway	Greg McCarron	Bernard B. Bond		1-1/8	1:52.40	$75,000	
1991	Rebuff	C. Juarez	Frances A. Merryman		1-1/8	1:47.20	$75,000	
1990	Rum and Gold	Alberto Delgado			1-1/8	1:54.80	$75,000	
1989	Ten Keys	Kent Desormeaux		Charles Linhoss	1-1/8	1:51.00	$75,000	
1988	Ten Keys	Mario Pino		Charles Linhoss	1-1/8	1:53.00	$75,000	
1987	Kitchener's Reward	Carlos Barrea			1-1/8	1:49.00	$60,000	
1986	Due North	Alberto Delgado			1-1/8	1:49.80	$60,000	
1985	Rolling Road	Donnie A. Miller Jr.			1-1/8	1:50.60	$60,000	
1984	Happy Chef	F. Manco			6.5 fur.	1:17.00	$25,000	
1983	Me Darlin Anna B.	William Passmore			6.5 fur.	1:17.20	$25,000	
1982	Love to Laugh	A. Agnello			6.5 fur.	1:18.40	$25,000	
1981	Double Door Prize	Herb Hinojosa			6.5 fur.	1:18.60	$30,000	
1980	Janet's Liebe	A. Berreira			6.5 fur.	1:18.60	$30,000	
1979	Ashanti Gold	G. Longa			1-1/8	1:19.40	$15,000	
1978	Rock'n Rollick	R. Fitzgerald			1-1/8	1:17.80	$15,000	

== See also ==
- Laurel Park Racecourse
