= 1995 Kentucky Derby =

Horse race

121st Kentucky Derby
- Kentucky Derby
- Location: Churchill Downs
- Date: May 6, 1995
- Winning horse: Thunder Gulch
- Jockey: Gary Stevens
- Trainer: D. Wayne Lukas
- Owner: Michael Tabor
- Conditions: Fast
- Surface: Dirt
- Attendance: 144,110

The 1995 Kentucky Derby was the 121st running of the Kentucky Derby. The race took place on May 6, 1995. There were 144,110 in attendance. Winning horse Thunder Gulch was the first in Kentucky Derby history to win after starting in the number 16 post.

== Payout ==
The 121st Kentucky Derby Payout Schedule

Program Number	Horse Name	Win	Place	Show
11	Thunder Gulch	$ 51.00	$24.20	$12.20
10	Tejano Run	-	$10.20	$6.80
2b	Timber Country	-	-	$3.80

- $2 Exacta: (11-10) Paid $480.00
- $2 Trifecta: (11-10-2) Paid $2,099.20

== Full results ==
Finished	Post	Horse	Jockey	Trainer	Owner	Time / behind
1st	16	Thunder Gulch	Gary Stevens	D. Wayne Lukas	Michael Tabor	2:01.27
2nd	14	Tejano Run	Jerry Bailey	Kenneth G. McPeek	Roy K. Monroe	
3rd	15	Timber Country	Pat Day	D. Wayne Lukas	Gainesway Farm, R. & B. Lewis & Overbrook Farm	
4th	10	Jumron	Goncalino Almeida	Gary Lewis	Charles W. Dunn	
5th	18	Mecke	Robbie Davis	Emanuel Tortora	James Lewis, Jr.	
6th	7	Eltish	Eddie Delahoussaye	Henry Cecil	Juddmonte Farms	
7th	2	Knockadoon	Chris McCarron	Anthony Reinstedler	William K. Warren, Jr.	
8th	12	Afternoon Deelites	Kent Desormeaux	Richard Mandella	Burt Bacharach	
9th	19	Citadeed	Eddie Maple	Richard A. Violette, Jr.	Ivan Allan	
10th	9	In Character	Chris Antley	Bruce L. Jackson	Baker & Farr & Jackson	
11th	6	Suave Prospect	Julie Krone	Nick Zito	William Condren & M.H. Sherman	
12th	11	Talkin Man	Mike E. Smith	Roger Attfield	Kinghaven Farm & H. Stollery & P. Wall	
13th	1	Dazzling Falls	Garrett Gomez	Chuck Turco	Chateau Ridge Farm, Inc.	
14th	17	Ski Captain	Yutaka Take	Hideyuki Mori	Shadai Racehorse Co., Ltd.	
15th	5	Jambalaya Jazz	Craig Perret	John T. Ward, Jr.	John C. Oxley	
16th	13	Serena's Song	Corey Nakatani	D. Wayne Lukas	Robert B. and Beverly Lewis	
17th	3	Pyramid Peak	Herb McCauley	John T. Ward, Jr.	John C. Oxley	
18th	8	Lake George	Shane Sellers	Mike Orman	William Boswell & David Lavin	
19th	4	Wild Syn	Randy Romero	Thomas K. Arnemann	Jurgen K. Arnemann	
