= Baldski =

American thoroughbred racehorse

- Sire: Nijinsky
- Grandsire: Northern Dancer
- Dam: Too Bald
- Damsire: Bald Eagle
- Sex: Stallion
- Foaled: 15 May 1974
- Died: 10 August 1993
- Country: United States of America
- Color: Dark bay or brown
- Breeder: Mrs. Charles W. Engelhard
- Owner: Cashman E C
- Record: 27: 7-3-3
- Earnings: $103,214

Major wins
- Gold Coast Handicap (1977)

Baldski (15 May 1974–10 August 1993) was an American-bred thoroughbred racehorse and a Brilliant/Intermediate Chef-de-race.

== Background ==
Baldski was a dark bay or brown stallion, 16 hands tall, with well-built hindquarters but a slim front end. He was bred by Jane Engelhard, recorded as Mrs. Charles W. Engelhard on papers after her late husband. He was considered well-bred.

Too Bald, Baldski's dam, was Broodmare of the Year and considered a top-class broodmare. Baldski was her fifth foal. She also produced Exceller, a multiple G1 winner and Hall of Fame member, and Capote, the 1986 American Champion Two-Year-Old Male and a notable sire.

Nijinsky, Baldski's sire, was a top-class racehorse, winning the English Triple Crown and achieving a Timeform rating of 138, and a top-class sire, being named a Chef-de-race and being on leading sire lists in at least three countries.

Baldski was sold in the 1975 Keeneland July yearling sale, being purchased for $75,000 by Eugene Cashman.

== Race career ==
Baldski had a lacklustre racing career. He won 7 of 27 starts, with his only stakes win being in a minor event at Calder, the Gold Coast Handicap. He also finished second the Grade 2 Ak-Sar-Ben Omaha Gold Cup Handicap and Grade 3 Ak-Sar-Ben President's Cup Handicap. In the Daily Racing Form's 1977 Free Handicap for American three-year-old males, he was rated at 114 pounds. Baldski raced from 1977 to 1979.

== Stud career ==
Baldski was retired to stud in 1980, entering stud at Farnsworth Farms in Florida, where he would spend his entire stud career. Baldski was a much better sire than racehorse, becoming a prominent sire, especially in Florida.

Baldski sired 577 foals, including 419 winners (72.6%) and 48 black-type winners (8.3%) (The Blood-Horse credits Baldski with an additional black-type winner (8.5%)). His AEI was 1.74. As a broodmare sire, Baldski sired 206 mares who produced 1176 foals, including 647 winners (55%) and 52 black-type winners (4.4%). His broodmare sire AEI was 1.47 with a CI of 1.37.

In 1989, Baldski-Diplomat Way was used as an example of a negative nick in a nicking pattern table published in The Blood-Horse, due to no stakes winners being produced from 19 foals bred on the cross. Later, stakes winners were bred on the cross, eventually totaling 3 stakes winners from 28 foals (10.7%).

Baldski died in 1993, when he was euthanized due to a fractured upper forelimb.

In the Roman-Miller dosage system, Baldski is considered a Brilliant/Intermediate Chef-de-race.

Notable descendants of Baldski include: Include, Lovely Maria, and Justify.

=== Notable progeny ===
- Chaposa Springs, winner of the Test Stakes, Ballerina Handicap, etc.
- Once Wild, winner of the Withers Stakes, Westchester Handicap, Coaltown Breeders' Cup Stakes, etc.
- Appealing Skier, winner of the Kentucky Cup Sprint Stakes, Withers Stakes, Hutcheson Stakes, etc.

=== Notable progeny of daughters ===
- Beautiful Pleasure, American Champion Older Female Horse and winner of the Breeders' Cup Distaff, Matron Stakes, Beldame Stakes, etc.
- Mecke, winner of the Super Derby, Arlington Million, Turf Classic Stakes, etc.
- Better Talk Now, winner of the Breeders' Cup Turf, Sword Dancer Handicap, Man o' War Stakes, etc.

== Pedigree ==
Pedigree of Baldski (USA), dark bay or brown stallion, foaled 1974
Sire Nijinsky (CAN) 1967	Northern Dancer (CAN); 1961	Nearctic (CAN)	Nearco (ITY)
Sire Nijinsky (CAN) 1967	Northern Dancer (CAN); 1961	Nearctic (CAN)	Lady Angela (GB)
Sire Nijinsky (CAN) 1967	Northern Dancer (CAN); 1961	Natalma (USA)	Native Dancer (USA)
Sire Nijinsky (CAN) 1967	Northern Dancer (CAN); 1961	Natalma (USA)	Almahmoud (USA)
Sire Nijinsky (CAN) 1967	Flaming Page (CAN); 1959	Bull Page (USA)	Bull Lea (USA)
Sire Nijinsky (CAN) 1967	Flaming Page (CAN); 1959	Bull Page (USA)	Our Page (USA)
Sire Nijinsky (CAN) 1967	Flaming Page (CAN); 1959	Flaring Top (USA)	Menow (USA)
Sire Nijinsky (CAN) 1967	Flaming Page (CAN); 1959	Flaring Top (USA)	Flaming Top (USA)
Dam Too Bald (USA) 1964	Bald Eagle (USA); 1955	Nasrullah (GB)	Nearco (ITY)
Dam Too Bald (USA) 1964	Bald Eagle (USA); 1955	Nasrullah (GB)	Mumtaz Begum (FR)
Dam Too Bald (USA) 1964	Bald Eagle (USA); 1955	Siama (USA)	Tiger (USA)
Dam Too Bald (USA) 1964	Bald Eagle (USA); 1955	Siama (USA)	China Face (USA)
Dam Too Bald (USA) 1964	Hidden Talent (USA); 1956	Dark Star (USA)	Royal Gem (AUS)
Dam Too Bald (USA) 1964	Hidden Talent (USA); 1956	Dark Star (USA)	Isolde (USA)
Dam Too Bald (USA) 1964	Hidden Talent (USA); 1956	Dangerous Dame (GB)	Nasrullah (GB)
Dam Too Bald (USA) 1964	Hidden Talent (USA); 1956	Dangerous Dame (GB)	Lady Kells (IRE)

Baldski is inbred 4S × 4D x 5D to Nearco, meaning Nearco appears in the fourth generation on both the sire and dam's side of the pedigree as well as the fifth generation on the dam's side. Baldski is also inbred to Nasrullah 3D × 4D and Bull Dog 5S × 5D x 5D.
