= Federico Tesio Stakes =

- Class: Ungraded Stakes
- Location: Laurel Park, Laurel, Maryland
- Inaugurated: 1981
- Race type: Thoroughbred - Flat racing
- Website: www.laurelpark.com

Race information
- Distance: 1 1/8 miles (9 furlongs)
- Surface: Dirt
- Track: left-handed
- Qualification: Three-year-olds
- Weight: Assigned
- Purse: $125,000

The Federico Tesio Stakes is an American Thoroughbred horse race held annually at Laurel Park in Laurel, Maryland over a distance of 1 1/8 miles on the dirt for three-year-old horses.

Run during the latter part of April/early May, the race can be a stepping stone to the second leg of the U.S. Triple Crown series, the Preakness Stakes. Local patrons refer to the Tesio Stakes as the "Preakness Trial." Since 2016, it has been a "Win and You're In" qualifier for the Preakness.

== History ==
The race was named in honor of famous Italian breeder Federico Tesio, owner of Dormello Stud in Dormelletto, Novara. Tesio was one of the most important breeders of Thoroughbreds in the history of horse racing. His homebreds Nearco and Ribot, both great sires, dominate Thoroughbred bloodlines throughout the world. Tesio died in 1954 at age 85.

The last horse to win this race and the Preakness was Deputed Testamony in 1983. Several Tesio runners have made a major impact on the Triple Crown by placing in the Preakness during the last twenty years, including Icabad Crane in 2008, Magic Weisner in 2002, Oliver's Twist in 1995, and Rock Point in 1989 and Broad Brush in 1986. In 2011, Tesio runner-up Ruler On Ice won the Belmont Stakes and in 1998 Tesio winner Thomas Jo placed third in the Belmont Stakes.

The Federico Tesio Stakes was an American Grade III stakes race from 1986 through 1997. The race was restricted to Maryland breeds from 1981 through 1985. It was run at 1 1/16 miles from 1981 to 1991 and from 2011 to 2015.

Prior to 2016, the race was held at Pimlico Race Course in Baltimore, Maryland. It was run at Pimlico again in 2021 following an emergency shift of racing dates from Laurel Park.

== Records ==
Speed record:

- 1 1/8 miles - 1:49.00 - Marciano (2001)
- 1 1/16 miles - 1:42.60 - Sparrowvon (1985)

Most wins by an owner:

- 2 - Earle I. Mack (1998 & 2008)

Most wins by a jockey:

- 3 - Ryan Fogelsonger (2003, 2004 & 2006)

Most wins by a trainer:

- 2 - King T. Leatherbury (2005 & 2006)
- 2 - J. William Boniface (1983 & 1995)

== Winners of the Federico Tesio Stakes ==
Year	Winner	Jockey	Trainer	Owner	Distance	Time	Purse	Grade
2026	Taj Mahal	Sheldon Russell	Brittany T. Russell	SF Racing, Starlight Racing, Madaket Stables, Stonestreet Stables, Bashor Racing, LLC, Determined Stables, Golconda Stables, Waves Edge Capital, LLC & Catherine Donovan	1-1/8	1:52.92	$125,000	
2025	Pay Billy	Raul E. Mena	Michael E. Gorham	RKTN Racing, LLC	1-1/8	1:52.78	$125,000	
2024	Copper Tax	J. G. Torrealba	Gary Cupuano	Rose Petal Stable	1-1/8	1:52.01	$125,000	
2023	Perform	Feargal Lynch	Claude R. McGaughey	Woodford Racing, Lane's End Farm, Phipps Stable, Ken Langone & Edward J. Hudson Jr.	1-1/8	1:52.18	$125,000	
2022	Joe	Victor Carrasco	Michael J. Trombetta	The Elkstone Group	1-1/8	1:52.30	$125,000	
2021	The Reds^{1}	Victor Carrasco	John Kimmel	Flanagan Racing	1-1/8	1:49.98	$125,000	
2020	Happy Saver	Trevor McCarthy	Todd A. Pletcher	Wertheimer and Frere	1-1/8	1:49.15	$125,000	
2019	Alwaysmining	Daniel Centeno	Kelly Rubley	Runnymede Racing	1-1/8	1:50.12	$125,000	
2018	Diamond King	Frankie Pennington	John Servis	Cash is King & D.J. Stable	1-1/8	1:50.31	$125,000	
2017	Twisted Tom	Feargal Lynch	Chad C. Brown	Cobra Farm, Inc.	1-1/8	1:53.60	$125,000	
2016	Awesome Speed	Jevian Toledo	Alan E. Goldberg	Colts Neck Stables	1-1/8	1:53.31	$100,000	
2015	Bodhisattva	Trevor McCarthy	Jose Corrales	Jose Corrales	1-1/16	1:45.18	$100,000	
2014	Kid Cruz	Julian Pimentel	Linda L. Rice	Vina Del Mar T-breds	1-1/16	1:47.38	$100,000	
2013	Abstraction	Leandro Goncalves	David Carroll	My Meadowview Farm	1-1/16	1:46.16	$75,750	
2012	Pretension	Javier Santiago	Christopher Grove	Kidwell Petite Stable	1-1/16	1:45.70	$75,000	
2011	Concealed Identity	Sheldon Russell	Edmond D. Gaudet	Linda Gaudet & MorrisBailey	1-1/16	1:45.67	$70,000	
2010	Bank the Eight	Mario G. Pino	Anthony W. Dutrow	Mercedes Stable	1-1/8	1:52.11	$70,000	
2009	Miner's Escape	Luis Garcia	Nick Zito	Robert V. LaPenta	1-1/8	1:51.23	$75,000	
2008	Icabad Crane	Jeremy Rose	H. Graham Motion	Earle I. Mack	1-1/8	1:50.83	$100,000	
2007	Xchanger	Ramon Dominguez	Mark Shuman	Circle Z Stables	1-1/8	1:49.98	$100,000	
2006	Ah Day	Ryan Fogelsonger	King T. Leatherbury	Jim Stable	1-1/8	1:50.88	$125,000	
2005	Malibu Moonshine	Steve Hamilton	King T. Leatherbury	Woodrow Marriott	1-1/8	1:53.31	$125,000	
2004	Water Cannon	Ryan Fogelsonger	Linda Albert	Ell Fredel & Pat Dooher	1-1/8	1:50.50	$100,000	
2003	Cherokee's Boy	Ryan Fogelsonger	Gary Capuano	Z W P Stable	1-1/8	1:49.86	$150,000	
2002	Smoked Em	Richard Migliore	Todd A. Pletcher	G Three Stable	1-1/8	1:50.33	$100,000	
2001	Marciano	Mark T. Johnston	Timothy F. Ritchey	Win More Stable	1-1/8	1:49.00	$150,000	
2000	Runspastum	Robbie Davis	Alan E. Goldberg	Jayeff B Stables	1-1/8	1:51.16	$150,000	
1999	Talks Cheap	Mike Luzzi	Linda L. Rice	Harry V. Quadracci	1-1/8	1:50.11	$150,000	
1998	Thomas Jo	Steve Hamilton	James A. Jerkens	Earle I. Mack & Team Valor	1-1/8	1:50.04	$200,000	
1997	Concerto	Mike Smith	John Tammaro	Kinsman Stables	1-1/8	1:49.10	$150,000	III
1996	Tour's Big Red	Joe Bravo	Enrique Alonso	William Penn	1-1/8	1:50.00	$200,000	III
1995	Oliver's Twist	Alberto Delgado	J. William Boniface	Charles M. Oliver	1-1/8	1:52.00	$200,000	III
1994	Silver Profile	Omar Klinger	Vincent L. Blengs	Vincent L. Blengs	1-1/8	1:51.40	$150,000	III
1993	Woods of Windsor	Rick Wilson	Ben W. Perkins, Jr.	Augustus Riggs, IV	1-1/8	1:49.40	$125,000	III
1992	Speakerphone	Clarence J. Ladner	Dean Gaudet	Israel Cohen	1-1/8	1:49.40	$125,000	III
1991	Tong Po	Marco Castaneda	Leon Blusiewicz	Robert L. Quinichett	1-1/16	1:44.20	$175,000	III
1990	Smelly	Jean Cruguet	Craig Nicholson	Bob Watkins	1-1/16	1:45.20	$200,000	III
1989	Rock Point	William Fox, Jr.	Sydney Watters, Jr.	Brookmeade Stable	1-1/16	1:44.20	$200,000	III
1988	Private Terms	Chris Antley	Charles Hadry	Locust Hill Farm	1-1/16	1:44.60	$170,000	III
1987	Rolls Aly	Richard Migliore	Bruce Johnstone	Francis X. Weber	1-1/16	1:44.40	$205,000	III
1986	Broad Brush	Chris McCarron	Richard W. Small	Robert E. Meyerhoff	1-1/16	1:44.80	$125,000	III
1985	Sparrowvon	Wayne Barnett	Harold A. Allen	Harold A. Allen	1-1/16	1:42.60	$115,000	
1984	Fourmatt	Paul Nicol, Jr.	Joe Clancy	Alfred Braunstein	1-1/16	1:43.80	$125,000	
1983	Deputed Testamony	Herb McCauley	J. William Boniface	Bonita Farm	1-1/16	1:42.80	$125,000	
1982	Hush Hush Hush	Jack Kaenel	Bill Dixon	Benray Farm	1-1/16	1:46.40	$92,500	
1981	Boston Tea	William Jenkins	Glenn L. Ballenger	Glenn L. Ballenger	1-1/16	1:44.80	$35,000	

^{1}Excellorator finished first, but was disqualified and placed second for interference.

== See also ==
- Federico Tesio Stakes top three finishers
- Pimlico Race Course
- List of graded stakes at Pimlico Race Course
