= Alberto Delgado (jockey) =

American jockey (born 1964)

Personal information
- Born: September 3, 1964 (age 61) Santurce, Puerto Rico
- Occupation: Jockey

Horse racing career
- Sport: Horse racing
- Career wins: 2,936+ (ongoing) as of July 6, 2021

Major racing wins
- Barbara Fritchie Handicap (1983); Jameela Stakes (1983, 1986); Caesar's Wish Stakes (1984); Jennings Handicap (1984); John B. Campbell Handicap (1984, 1994); Native Dancer Stakes (1984, 1999); Obeah Stakes (1984); Find Handicap (1986, 1990); Harrison E. Johnson Memorial Handicap (1986); Maryland Million Oaks (1986, 1994); Twixt Stakes (1986, 1994); Squan Song Stakes (1988, 1991, 1992, 2009); Ben's Cat Stakes (1990, 2001); Private Terms Stakes (1990); Long Look Handicap (1991); Snow Goose Handicap (1991); Fire Plug Stakes (1993); General George Stakes (1993); Nellie Morse Stakes (1993,1995); Federico Tesio Stakes (1995); Maryland Million Distaff Handicap (1995); Miracle Wood Stakes (1995); Woodlawn Stakes (1995); Martha Washington Stakes (1999); Gallorette Stakes (2000); Locust Grove Handicap (2000); Maryland Million Turf (2001)

Racing awards
- Eclipse Award for Outstanding Apprentice Jockey (1982)

Significant horses
- California Chrome, Oliver's Twist, Stellarette, Wait for the Lady, Ameri Valay, Colstar

Alberto Delgado (born September 3, 1964) is an American National Champion jockey born in Santurce, Puerto Rico who has ridden predominantly in California and Maryland. He rode California Chrome in several of the horse's early races in the 2013 season. Both his father and younger brother Willie were jockeys. Willie, who also spent some time as a horse trainer on the east coast, came west in 2013 at his brother's urging and became California Chrome's regular exercise rider during the 2014 season even though the older Delgado was not kept on as the colt's jockey.

In 1982, Alberto Delgado won the Eclipse Award for Outstanding Apprentice Jockey on mounts that earned over $1.7 million at the track that year. As a promising young rider, he won the 1983 Grade III Barbara Fritchie Handicap on Stellarette, and the 1984 John B. Campbell Handicap on Island Champ. In the 1990s he had two graded stakes wins with Wait for the Lady, and won the Campbell handicap a second time with Ameri Valay. He came in second in the 1995 Preakness Stakes on Oliver's Twist, and in that year topped $2 million in racetrack earnings (jockeys share being approximately 10% of the horse's winnings). He won three graded stakes in the 1999–2000 seasons on Colstar.

Most of his racing career has been at Del Mar racetrack in San Diego, California and the Maryland tracks, notably Laurel Park, where he had several graded stakes wins, and Pimlico, home to the Preakness. He also won graded stakes races at Churchill Downs and Meadowlands.
