= Maryland Million Turf =

- Class: Restricted State-bred Stakes
- Location: Laurel Park Racecourse, Laurel, Maryland, United States
- Inaugurated: 1986
- Race type: Thoroughbred - Flat racing
- Website: Marylandthoroughbred.com

Race information
- Distance: 1 1/8 miles (9 furlongs)
- Surface: Turf
- Track: Left-handed
- Qualification: Three-year-olds and up
- Purse: $125,000

Maryland Million Turf is an American Thoroughbred horse race held annually in October since 1986 primarily at Laurel Park Racecourse in Laurel, Maryland or at Pimlico Race Course in Baltimore. To be eligible for the Maryland Million Turf, a horse must be sired by a stallion who stands in Maryland. Due to that restriction the race is classified as a non-graded or "listed" stakes race and is not eligible for grading by the American Graded Stakes Committee.

The race is part of Maryland Million Day, a 12-race program held in mid October that was the creation of renowned television sports journalist Jim McKay. The "Maryland Million" is the first State-Bred showcase event ever created. Since 1986, 27 other events in 20 states have imitated the showcase and its structure.

From its inception in 1986 through 1995, the race was run restricted to only three-year-olds. The distance of the race from 1986 through 1992 was 1 1/16 miles. Since 1993 it has been a 1 1/8 mile competition and currently offers a purse of $125,000. Because of inclement weather the race was moved to the main track on dirt in 1992 and in 1995.

In its 30th running in 2015, the race is restricted to those horses who were sired by a stallion who stands in the state of Maryland. Both the entrant horse and their stallion must be nominated to the Maryland Million program.

== Records ==
Most wins: – Five horses have won the Maryland Million Classic twice:

- Phlash Phelps (2015, 2016)
- Roadhog (2012, 2013)
- Pocket Patch (2010, 2011)
- La Reine's Terms (2002, 2005)
- Winsox (1997, 1998)

Speed record:

- 1 1/8 mile : 1:46.03 – Forty Crowns (2007)
- 1 1/16 miles : 1:42.40 – Wave Wise (1989)

Most wins by an owner:

- 2 – Hillwood Stable (2015, 2016)
- 2 – Ellendale Racing (2012, 2013)
- 2 – Charles McGill (2010, 2011)
- 2 – Sondra Bender – La Reine's Terms (2002, 2005)
- 2 – Richard C. Granville – Winsox (1997, 1998)

Most wins by a jockey:

- 4 – Horacio Karamanos (2002, 2006, 2008, 2012)

Most wins by a trainer:

- 3 – John R. S. Fisher

== Winners of the Maryland Million Turf since 1986 ==
Yr	Winner	Age	Jockey	Trainer	Owner	Dist. (Miles)	Time	Purse
2021	Somekindofmagician	7	Angel Cruz	Gary Contessa	Bell Gable Stable LLC	1-1/8	1:49.00	$102,000
2019	Pretty Good Year	4	Sheldon Russell	Kelly Rubley	Lead Off Stable	1-1/8	1:52.32	$125,000
2019	Mr. d'Angelo	8	Jevian Toledo	Tim Woolley	Kevin Morgan	1 mile	1:36.88	$125,000
2018	Talk Show Man	8	Jevian Toledo	Hamilton Smith	Michael J. Harrison	1 mile	1:38.64	$125,000
2017	Spartianos	5	Nik Juarez	Michael Pino	Nick Sanna Stables	1 mile	1:36.84	$125,000
2016	Phlash Phelps	5	Victor Carrasco	Rodney Jenkins	Hillwood Stable	1 mile	1:34.57	$125,000
2015	Phlash Phelps	4	Victor Carrasco	Rodney Jenkins	Hillwood Stable	1 mile	1:35.35	$125,000
2014	Talk Show Man	4	Xavier Perez	Hamilton Smith	Michael Harrison	1 mile	1:39.20	$125,000
2013	Roadhog	6	Kendrick Carmouche	Elizabeth Merryman	Ellendale Racing	1 mile	1:39.29	$126,250
2012	Roadhog	5	Horacio Karamanos	Elizabeth Merryman	Ellendale Racing	1-1/8	1:47.15	$100,000
2011	Pocket Patch	5	Forest Boyce	Flint Stites	Charles McGill	1-1/8	1:56.67	$100,000
2010	Pocket Patch	4	Jonathan Joyce	Flint Stites	Charles McGill	1-1/8	1:52.30	$100,000
2009	Target Sighted	3	Jeremy Rose	Francis P. Campitelli	The Maltese Cross II	1-1/8	1:49.03	$200,000
2008	Broadway Producer	5	Horacio Karamanos	John P. Terranova II	Sovereign Stable	1-1/8	1:49.99	$200,000
2007	Forty Crowns	4	Luis Garcia	Edmond Gaudet	Morris Bailey	1-1/8	1:46.03	$200,000
2006	Private Scandal	6	Horacio Karamanos	Peter Bazeos	Ioannis T. Korologos	1-1/8	1:47.56	$150,000
2005	La Reine's Terms	10	Jeremy Rose	Lawrence Murray	Sondra Bender	1-1/8	1:51.60	$150,000
2004	Dr. Detroit	5	Mario Pino	Ann Merryman	Richard Blue	1-1/8	1:50.96	$100,000
2003	Move Those Chains	4	Ramon Dominguez	Kevin Boniface	Patricia Runyon	1-1/8	1:47.28	$100,000
2002	La Reine's Terms	7	Horacio Karamanos	Lawrence Murray	Sondra Bender	1-1/8	1:49.28	$100,000
2001	Elberton	4	Alberto Delgado	Luigi Gino	C. Frank Hopkins	1-1/8	1:48.52	$100,000
2000	Cynics Beware	6	Ramon Dominguez	Mary Welby McGill	Two Rivers Farm	1-1/8	1:46.95	$100,000
1999	Private Slip	5	Ricky Frazier	Dale Capuano	Crown Valley Stable	1-1/8	1:54.20	$100,000
1998	Winsox	7	Edgar S. Prado	J. William Boniface	Richard C. Granville	1-1/8	1:51.40	$100,000
1997	Winsox	6	Edgar S. Prado	J. William Boniface	Richard C. Granville	1-1/8	1:58.20	$100,000
1996	Trump Mahal	6	Seth Martinez	Robin Graham	Frank P. Wright	1-1/8	1:59.40	$100,000
1995	Short Stay	3	José A. Santos	John R. S. Fisher	Fitz Eugene Dixon Jr.	1-1/8	1:52.00	$100,000
1994	Warning Glance	3	Mike Smith	Charles Hadry	Stuart S. Janney III	1-1/8	1:52.60	$100,000
1993	Awad	3	John Velazquez	David Donk	Ryehill Farm	1-1/8	1:49.30	$100,000
1992	Wood Fox	3	Mario Pino	Katherine Voss	John Merryman	1-1/16	1:44.60	$100,000
1991	Scottsville	3	Rick Wilson	John R. S. Fisher	Joseph Walker, Jr.	1-1/16	1:43.00	$100,000
1990	Hear the Bells	3	Rick Wilson	John R. S. Fisher	Due Process Stable	1-1/16	1:43.20	$100,000
1989	Wave Wise	3	Greg Hutton	James E. Day	Sam-Son Farm	1-1/16	1:42.40	$100,000
1988	Master Speaker	3	Laffit Pincay, Jr.	Virgil W. Raines	Anderson Fowler	1-1/16	1:43.20	$100,000
1987	Ringling	3	Laffit Pincay, Jr.	Ronald Alfanso	Glenn Stable	1-1/16	1:49.20	$100,000
1986	Glow	3	Jerry D. Bailey	Woody Stephens	Sonia Rogers	1-1/16	1:44.40	$100,000

== See also ==
- Maryland Million Turf top three finishers
- Maryland Million Day
- Laurel Park Racecourse
