= Maryland Million Turf top three finishers =

This is a listing of the horses that finished in either first, second, or third place and the number of starters in the Maryland Million Turf, an American State-bred stakes race for horses three years-old and up at 1-1/8 miles on the turf held at Laurel Park Racecourse in Laurel, Maryland. (List 1986–present)

Year	Winner	Second	Third	Starters
2021	Somekindofmagician	Johng	Street Copper	10
2020	Pretty Good Year	Cannon Roar	Nick Papagiorgio	14
2019	Mr. d'Angelo	Somekindofmagician	Pretty Good Year	14
2018	Talk Show Man	Phlash Phelps	Grandiflora	9
2017	Spartianos	Somekindofmugician	Talk Show Man	7
2016	Phlash Phelps	Spartianos	Grandiflora	10
2015	Phlash Phelps	Roadhog	A P Elvis	10
2014	Talk Show Man	Ben's Cat	Roadhog	12
2013	Roadhog	Ben's Cat	Target Sighted	11
2012	Roadhog	Change of Command	Pasta Lover	11
2011	Pocket Patch	Day Flight	Ham and Ernie	12
2010	Pocket Patch	Ham and Ernie	Eighttofasttocatch	10
2009	Target Sighted	Moon Ala Mode	Into the Wind	n/a
2008	Broadway Producer	Dr. Rico	Knight in Armour	n/a
2007	Forty Crowns	Dr. Rico	Broadway Producer	n/a
2006	Private Scandal	D. J.'s Hero	Quantico Joe	n/a
2005	La Reine's Terms	Dr. Detroit	Rubi Echo	n/a
2004	Dr. Detroit	Private Scandal	La Reine's Terms	n/a
2003	Move Those Chains	Watchman's Warning	Private Scandal	n/a
2002	La Reine's Terms	Elberton	Watchman's Warning	n/a
2001	Elberton	Watchman's Warning	Cynics Beware	n/a
2000	Cynics Beware	Hardy's Halo	Virginia Carnival	n/a
1999	Private Slip	Hardy's Halo	La Reine's Terms	n/a
1998	Winsox	Brother's Angel	Mythical Deity	n/a
1997	Winsox	Trump Mahal	Charle's Quest	n/a
1996	Trump Mahal	Winsox	Warning Glance	n/a
1995	Short Stay	Pin Tail Pass	Agro Craig	n/a
1994	Warning Glance	Sandman Sims	Sir Wollaston	n/a
1993	Awad	Dancing Douglas	Take Heed	n/a
1992	Wood Fox	Dr. Louis A.	Dekova	n/a
1991	Scottsville	Subtle Step	Bomb the Bridge	n/a
1990	Hear the Bells	Worthington Winner	Divine Warning	n/a
1989	Wave Wise	Ringerman	Tot of Rum	n/a
1988	Master Speaker	Second Lieutenant	Viva Deputy	n/a
1987	Ringing	North Lord	Wise Old Owl	n/a
1986	Glow	Air Dancer	Where's Bob	n/a

== See also ==
- Maryland Million Turf
- Maryland Million Day
- Laurel Park Racecourse
