= Tejano Run =

American-bred Thoroughbred racehorse

- Sire: Tejano
- Grandsire: Caro
- Dam: Royal Run
- Damsire: Wavering Monarch
- Sex: Stallion
- Foaled: 1992
- Country: United States
- Color: Chestnut
- Breeder: Runnymede Farm
- Owner: Roy K. & Joyce Monroe
- Trainer: Kenneth McPeek
- Record: 21: 8-4-6
- Earnings: US$1,166,842

Major wins
- Kentucky Cup Juvenile Stakes (1994); Breeders' Futurity Stakes (1994); Fort Harrod Stakes (1996); Pioneer Stakes (1996); Fall Championship Stakes (1997); Widener Handicap (1997)

Honors
- Tejano Run Stakes at Turfway Park

Tejano Run (May 5, 1992 – 2011) is an American Thoroughbred racehorse who came second in the 1995 Kentucky Derby to Thunder Gulch.

== Background ==
Tejano Run was bred by Catesby Woodford Clay at his Runnymede Farm outside Paris, Kentucky. He was bought and raced by Roy and Joyce Monroe and was trained by Kenneth McPeek.

== Racing career ==
As a two-year-old, Tejano Run won the Breeders' Futurity Stakes and Kentucky Cup Juvenile Stakes.

As a three-year-old, he came second to Thunder Gulch in the 1995 Kentucky Derby. He then ran ninth to Timber Country in the Preakness Stakes.

As a four and five-year-old, Tejano Run won on both the dirt and turf. He set a new stakes record in winning the 1996 Maker's Mark Mile Stakes on turf at Keeneland Racecourse. He also won the 1996 Pioneer Stakes and 1997 Fall Championship Stakes at Turfway Park. The Pioneer Stakes was renamed in his honor. Ridden by Pat Day in the 1997 Widener Handicap on dirt at Hialeah Park, Tejano Run earned a Beyer Speed Figure of 123.

== Stud career ==
Retired to stud duty in Kentucky, since the 2006 breeding season Tejano Run has been standing at Michael and Chris Blake's Ascot Stud at Port Colborne, Ontario, Canada. Among his progeny are:

- One For Rose - three-time Canadian Champion; career earnings $1,291,303
- Anglian Prince (b. 1999) - won Marine Stakes; career earnings $685,577
- Shaws Creek (b. 1999) - won Clarendon Stakes, Plate Trial Stakes; career earnings $628,130
- Dionisia (b. 2003) - Italian Champion Two-Year-Old Filly (2005), Italian Champion Three-Year-Old Filly (2006)
