= Caesar's Wish Stakes =

- Class: Ungraded Stakes
- Location: Laurel Park Racecourse, Laurel, Maryland; United States
- Inaugurated: 1978
- Race type: Thoroughbred - Flat racing
- Website: www.laurelpark.com

Race information
- Distance: 1 mile (8 furlongs)
- Surface: Dirt
- Track: left-handed
- Qualification: Three-years-old, fillies
- Weight: Assigned
- Purse: $100,000

The Caesar's Wish Stakes is a race for Thoroughbred horses held in late March at Laurel Park in Maryland, USA. The ungraded stakes race is open to three-year-old fillies, is run over one mile on the dirt, and offers a purse of $100,000. It is a minor race on the road to the Filly Triple Crown each spring. The winner of the Caesar's Wish Stakes typically races next in either the Weber City Miss Stakes (Black-Eyed Susan Stakes Trial) at Pimlico Race Course in Baltimore or the Gazelle Stakes at Aqueduct Racetrack in New York.

This race is named for Caesar's Wish (born 1975), who won 11 of her 16 starts, including the Grade I Black-Eyed Susan Stakes and the Grade I Mother Goose Stakes. She had career earnings of $314,507 and nine stakes victories. Caesar's Wish was a Maryland-bred daughter of Proudest Roman out of a mare name Primper (by Art Market). She was near the very top of her generation being named Maryland-bred Champion Filly at both age two and age three finishing in the money in 15 of 16 starts in those years. She was owned by Mrs. Sally Gibson, trained by Richard W. Small and bred by former Pimlico Race Course owners and executives Herman and Nathan Cohen. Trainer Dickie Small considered the filly as one of his greatest racing achievements, "She may not have made the most money, but she was definitely the fastest horse I've ever had." Caesar's Wish won five stakes races at age two and four stakes races at age three. After capturing the Black-Eyed Susan and the Mother Goose Stakes she attempted to seal her bid as the nation's top filly in 1978 by winning the Alabama Stakes. The chestnut filly was sent off as the odds on favorite but died of a heart attack at the top of the stretch.

The Caesar's Wish Stakes was inaugurated at the former Bowie Race Track in 1978 and was run there through 1985. The race was run at Pimlico Race Course from 1986-2004, it was not run between 2005 and 2012 when it was shifted to Laurel Park Race Course beginning in 2013. The race has been run at three distances including it current length of one mile. From 1984-2004 the Caesar's Wish was run at its most common distance of one mile and one sixteenth and at seven furlongs between 1981-1983.

== Records ==
Speed record:

- 1 1/16 miles - 1:42 3/5 - Noblest Heart (1989)
- 1 mile - 1:38.01 - Jenda's Agenda (2017)
- 7 furlongs - 1:24 1/5 - Hoverclubber (1981)

Most wins by an owner:

- 2- Robert Meyerhoff (DBA Fitzugh LLC in '07) (1994 &2007)

Most wins by a jockey:

- 5 - Mario Pino (1982, 1983, 1997, 1998 & 2001)

Most wins by a trainer:

- 2 - Todd A. Pletcher (1998 & 2005)
- 2 - Richard W. Small (1987 & 2004)

== Winners of the Caesar's Wish Stakes since 1978 ==
Year	Winner	Age	Jockey	Trainer	Owner	Dist. (Miles)	Time	Purse$
2021	Mrs. Orb	6	Horacio Karamanos	Michael Miceli	Ruggeri Stable & Script R Farm	1 1/16	1:44.17	$100,000
2018	2020	Race not held						
2017	Jenda's Agenda	3	Gabriel Saez	Larry Jones	Fox Hill Farms (Rick Porter)	1-mile	1:38.01	$100,000
2016	Sophia's Song	3	Victor Carrasco	Todd A. Pletcher	Mathis Stable LLC	1-mile	1:38.40	$100,000
2015	By the Moon	3	Victor Carrasco	Michelle Nevin	Jay Em Ess Stable	1-mile	1:38.20	$100,000
2014	Steady N Love	3	Victor Carrasco	Gary Capuano	ZWP Stable Inc.	1-mile	1:41.00	$100,000
2013	Walkwithapurpose	3	Jeremy Rose	Ignacio Correas	Sagamore Farm	1-mile	1:38.20	$150,000
2005	2012	Race not held						
2004	He Loves Me	3	Jozbin Santana	Richard W. Small	Buckingham Farm	1 1/16	1:44.60	$75,000
2003	Grace Bay	3	Rick Wilson	Dale Capuano	Steven Newby	1 1/16	1:45.40	$75,000
2002	Madame X Ski	3	Richard Migliore	James Jerkins	Susan & John Moore	1 1/16	1:44.80	$75,000
2001	Hunka Hunka Lori Z	3	Mario Pino	Jerald Ferris	Charles Reed	1 1/16	1:45.60	$75,000
2000	Case of the Blues	3	Mark T. Johnston	Hamilton Smith	Skeedattle Farms, II	1 1/16	1:47.00	$100,000
1999	Silent Valay	3	Greg Hutton	John Robb	Hal C. B. Clagett III	1 1/16	1:44.80	$75,000
1998	Maragold Princess	3	Edgar Prado	Todd A. Pletcher	River Meadow Farm	1 1/16	1:44.60	$75,000
1997	Weather Vane	3	Mario Pino	Richard Delp	Par Four Racing Stable	1 1/16	1:43.60	$75,000
1996	Marfa's Finale	3	A. Bracho	William Donavan	Stoneworth Farm	1 1/16	1:44.80	$75,000
1995	Blue Sky Princess	3	Mario Pino	Robin L. Graham	Frank Wright	1 1/16	1:46.40	$75,000
1994	Calipha	3	Rick Wilson	Grover Delp	Nancy Bayard	1 1/16	1:44.20	$75,000
1993	Race not held							
1992	Gammy's Alden	3	Mark T. Johnston	Jack Winterbotham	Vincent Bracciale Jr.	1 1/16	1:46.20	$50,000
1991	Wide Country	3	Santos Chavez	Robert Camac	Tommy Tanner	1 1/16	1:44.00	$75,000
1990	Valay Maid	3	Marco Castaneda		Mr. & Mrs. A. J. Hamilton	1 1/16	1:45.40	$75,000
1989	Noblest Heart	3	Joe Rocco	Donald H. Barr	Lewisfield Farm	1 1/16	1:42.60	$75,000
1988	Willa On the Move	3	J. Edwards	Leon J. Blusiewicz	Lorraine Quinichett	1 1/16	1:44.00	$70,000
1987	Double Bunctious	3	Donnie Miller	Richard W. Small	Dan D. Westland	1 1/16	1:45.60	$50,000
1986	Aroundback	3	J. Estrada	Arthur Wendel	Arthur Wendel	1 1/16	1:45.00	$50,000
1985	Apalgaffey	3	Greg Hutton	Alan S. Kline	Honey Acres Farm	1 1/16	1:45.40	$25,000
1984	Little Fuzzy	3	Alberto Delgado		Calvin Brockdorff	1 1/16	1:46.80	$35,000
1983	Any Spray	3	D. Byrnes		J. A. Manfuso	7 fur.	1:24.20	$25,000
1982	Wicked Wave	3	Mario Pino			7 fur.	1:25.00	$25,000
1981	Hoverclubber	3	Jack Kaenel		Trillora Inc.	7 fur.	1:24.20	$35,000
1979	1980	Race not held						
1978	Silver Ice	3	Thomas J. Kupfer		C. Oliver Goldsmith	1 1/16	1:45.40	$30,000

== See also ==
- Caesar's Wish Stakes "top three finishers" and starters
- Laurel Park Racecourse
