= Mecke (horse) =

American Thoroughbred racehorse

- Sire: Maudlin
- Grandsire: Foolish Pleasure
- Dam: Beautiful Bid
- Damsire: Baldski
- Sex: Stallion
- Foaled: 1992
- Country: United States
- Color: Bay
- Breeder: Farnsworth Farms (Mike Sherman)
- Owner: James & Alice Lewis Jr.
- Trainer: Emanuel Tortora
- Record: 40: 12-7-9
- Earnings: US$2,470,550

Major wins
- Affirmed Stakes (1994); Super Derby (1995); Tropical Park Derby (1995); Arlington Million (1996); Tropical Turf Handicap (1996); Turf Classic Stakes (1996); Widener Handicap (1996); Super Bowl Handicap (1996); Mac Diarmida Handicap (1997)

Honors
- Mecke Handicap at Gulfstream Park

Mecke (March 26, 1992 – June 26, 2013) was an American Thoroughbred racehorse purchased for $40,000 who retired having earned more than $2.4 million while winning two Grade 1 stakes on grass and equaling a track record time in another Grade 1 race on dirt.

== Breeding ==
Bred in Florida by Mike Sherman's Farnsworth Farms, winner of the 1996 Eclipse Award for Outstanding Breeder, Mecke was sired by multiple stakes winner Maudlin, a son of 1975 Kentucky Derby winner and U.S. Racing Hall of Fame inductee, Foolish Pleasure. Mecke's dam was Beautiful Bid, a daughter of Baldski who was a son of the 1970 English Triple Crown winner Nijinsky who in turn was a son of the legendary sire, Northern Dancer.

Mecke was a full brother to Beautiful Pleasure (foaled 1995) who would win the 1999 Breeders' Cup Distaff and be voted that year's American Champion Older Dirt Female Horse.

== Racing career ==
Owned by Floridians James and Alice Lewis, Mecke was trained by West Palm Beach, Florida native, Manny Tortora. As a two-year-old in 1994, Mecke was ridden to victory by Gary Boulanger in the Affirmed Stakes, a Florida Stallion Stakes at Florida's Calder Race Course.

Among Mecke's successes in 1995 was a win in the Grade 1 Super Derby in which he equaled the Louisiana Downs track record for a mile and one-quarter on dirt. His two other Grade 1 wins in 1996 came on the turf when he won the Arlington Million at Chicago's Arlington Park and the Early Times Turf Classic at Churchill Downs in Louisville, Kentucky.

Making his first start as a five-year-old on January 13, 1997, the versatile Mecke won the Mac Diarmida Handicap on a sloppy Gulfstream Park track under Hall of Fame jockey Jerry Bailey. Mecke made his next start, and what would prove to be his last, on February 8. Trailing the field of ten he made a closing charge to finish third behind winner Formal Gold and runner-up Skip Away in the Grade 1 Donn Handicap at Gulfstream Park.

On February 28, trainer Tortora announced that the horse was being retired from racing citing X-rays showing he had hurt the lower end of his right front cannon bone. The trainer felt that the injury likely occurred during the Donn Handicap but only showed up when he began the rigors of training necessary to be ready for his next scheduled start.

== At stud ==
Mecke was sent to stand at Ocala Stud Farm in Florida where he remained thru 2008. He stood in Tennessee from 2008 to 2011 where he was the leading sire for each of his four years there. Transferred to Hidden Springs Farm in Indiana in 2012 where he ranked among the top sires in that state before his death on June 26, 2013.

While none of Mecke's offspring equaled his success in racing, his 2000 foal Supah Blitz was his best. A multiple graded stakes winner, Supah Blitz retired with earnings of more than $1.3 million.

== Pedigree ==
Pedigree of Mecke, bay stallion, March 26, 1992
Sire Maudlin	Foolish Pleasure	What a Pleasure	Bold Ruler
Sire Maudlin	Foolish Pleasure	What a Pleasure	Grey Flight
Sire Maudlin	Foolish Pleasure	Fool-Me-Not	Tom Fool
Sire Maudlin	Foolish Pleasure	Fool-Me-Not	Cuadrilla
Sire Maudlin	Zonta	Dr. Fager	Rough'n Tumble
Sire Maudlin	Zonta	Dr. Fager	Aspidistra
Sire Maudlin	Zonta	Santa Tina	Santa Claus
Sire Maudlin	Zonta	Santa Tina	Reine des Bois
Dam Beautiful Bid	Baldski	Nijinsky	Northern Dancer
Dam Beautiful Bid	Baldski	Nijinsky	Flaming Page
Dam Beautiful Bid	Baldski	Too Bald	Bald Eagle
Dam Beautiful Bid	Baldski	Too Bald	Hidden Talent
Dam Beautiful Bid	Biddy Big	Palestinian	Sun Again
Dam Beautiful Bid	Biddy Big	Palestinian	Dolly Whisk
Dam Beautiful Bid	Biddy Big	Spoony	Devil Diver
Dam Beautiful Bid	Biddy Big	Spoony	Bimlette (family: 19-b)
