= Timber Country =

American Thoroughbred racehorse

- Sire: Woodman
- Grandsire: Mr. Prospector
- Dam: Fall Aspen
- Damsire: Pretense
- Sex: Stallion
- Foaled: 1992
- Country: United States
- Colour: Chestnut
- Breeder: Lowquest Ltd.
- Owner: Overbrook Farm, Gainesway Stable, Robert & Beverly Lewis
- Trainer: D. Wayne Lukas
- Record: 12: 5-1-4
- Earnings: $1,558,835

Major wins
- Balboa Stakes (1994); Champagne Stakes (1994); Breeders' Cup Juvenile (1994); American Triple Crown; Preakness Stakes (1995)

Awards
- U.S. Champion 2-Yr-Old Colt (1994)
- Last updated on September 6, 2007

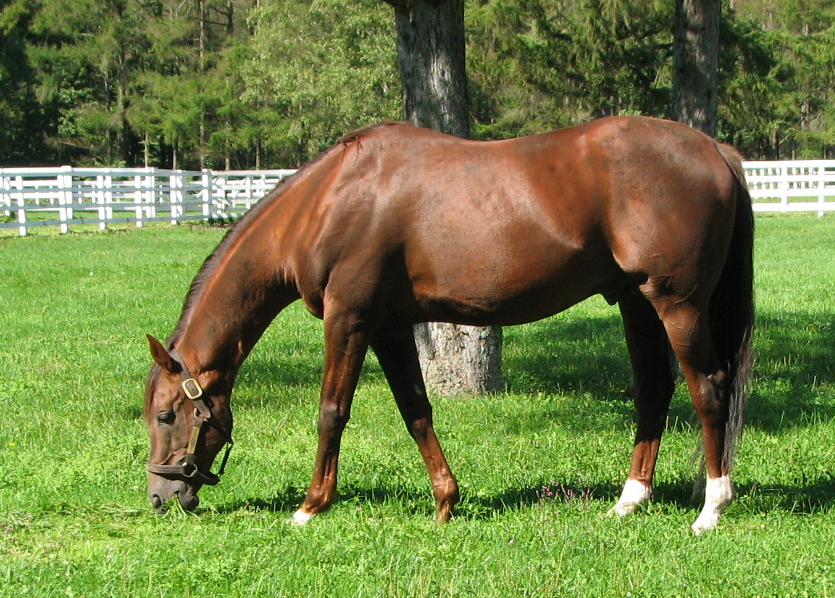

Timber Country (foaled April 12, 1992 in Kentucky - February 24, 2016) was an American Thoroughbred racehorse who was the first horse to ever win the Breeders' Cup Juvenile and American Triple Crown Classic Race when he won the 1995 Preakness Stakes.

== Background ==
Timber Country, a bay horse with three white socks and a small nose snip, was born April 12, 1992, in Kentucky. A son of Irish champion Woodman, he was out of the mare Fall Aspen, a daughter of Pretense. Fall Aspen, who won the 1978 Matron Stakes, was also the dam of Grade I winner and champion Bianconi, Grade I winner Northern Aspen, and Grade II winners Elle Seule and Colorado Dancer.

Timber Country grew to be a large horse, standing 17 hands high at maturity.

Timber Country is closely related to the Dubai World Cup winner, Dubai Millennium, a son of Mr. Prospector and Timber Country's half-sister, Colorado Dancer.

Bred by Lowquest Stud, Timber Country sold for $500,000 at the 1993 Keeneland July yearling sale. Future Hall of Fame trainer D. Wayne Lukas had seen Timber Country before the sale and planned to buy him. Lukas was having dinner at the home of William Young, owner of Overbrook Farm, along with Graham Beck of Gainesway Farm, when he asked to excuse himself to return to the sale. Lukas said, "Graham Beck followed me to my car and asked who the colt was and I said he was out of Fall Aspen. He asked who I was buying him for and I said, 'I don't know but I'm going to buy him.' He said for me to go ahead and buy him and they would put something together." At the sale, he was purchased by Lukas for a partnership between Overbrook Farm, Gainesway Stable, and Robert and Beverly Lewis.

== Racing career ==
=== 1994: two-year-old season ===
Racing at age two in California, the colt won four of his seven starts. At Del Mar Racetrack, he won the Balboa Stakes and was third in the Del Mar Futurity. Sent East, Timber Country won the Grade I Champagne Stakes at Belmont Park in Elmont, New York, while running on the lead setting the pace. His victory made him the betting favorite for the most important race of the year for his age group, the Breeders' Cup Juvenile. In that race, Timber Country came from well back to win going away. His 1994 performances earned him U.S. Champion 2-Yr-Old Colt honors.

=== 1995: three-year-old season ===
In the spring of 1995 at Santa Anita Park in Arcadia, California, three-year-old Timber Country ran third in the San Rafael Stakes and second in the San Felipe Stakes. Going into the Kentucky Derby the colt was winless in all three of his 1995 starts and was up against a field that included strong competition such as Tejano Run, who had finished third to Timber Country in the Breeders' Cup Juvenile; Thunder Gulch, who was also trained by D. Wayne Lukas and who had won that spring's Fountain of Youth Stakes and Florida Derby; Talkin Man, the Canadian Two-Year-Old Champion coming off an impressive win in the Wood Memorial Stakes; plus the future Hall of Fame filly Serena's Song, who was owned by Robert and Beverly Lewis, one of Timber Country's owners.

Drawing the difficult post position seventeen in the Kentucky Derby's nineteen-horse field, Timber Country was among the trailers for most of the race. A horse who liked to come from behind (although he won on the lead setting the pace in the 1994 Champagne Stakes), entering the homestretch he was still only in tenth place and, bunched between a congestion of challengers, lost time when he had to swing to the outside to find some running room. In the stretch drive jockey Pat Day and Timber County made a late move to get between horses and came on strongly enough to finish third behind runner-up Tejano Run and winner Thunder Gulch.

In the Preakness Stakes, the second leg of the U.S. Triple Crown series, Timber Country was the parimutuel betting favorite. The colt won the race after he passed five horses through the turn and homestretch and won by half a length over runner-up Oliver's Twist and third-place finisher Thunder Gulch. Timber Country's win marked the first time since the establishment of the Breeders' Cup Juvenile in 1984 that a winner of that race went on to win one of the American Classic races.

Made the heavy favorite to win the third and final leg of the Triple Crown, Timber Country had to be withdrawn from the Belmont Stakes on the day before the race as a result of a high fever from a virus that saw his temperature nearing 103 degrees. After returning to training post-fever, he suffered a tendon injury, and was retired.

== Stud career ==
Retired to stud duty, Timber Country was first sent Shadai Farm, a breeding operation located in Hokkaido, Japan, owned by brothers Teruya and Katsumi Yoshida. While there, he was also shuttled to Australia, where he notably sired Eremein, a five-time Group One winner with career earnings in excess of A$4 million. In 2001, Timber Country stood in Dubai, then was returned to Japan, this time standing at Lex Stud in Hokkaido, where he remained.

Timber Country was not a consistent stallion, though he sired a Grade I winner in all three countries he stood in. His best foal is Japanese-born son Admire Don, who won seven Grade I races in Japan and was named Japanese Champion Two-Year-Old Colt of 2001 and Champion Older Male Horse of 2003 and 2004. He is also the sire of Australian gelding Eremein, a five-time Grade I winner with career earnings in excess of A$4 million. He is the sire of filly Balletto, born in Dubai, who won the Grade I Frizette Stakes in the United States.

Timber Country is the damsire of Mukhadram, who won the 2014 Eclipse Stakes in Great Britain, Copano Rickey, two-time winner of the February Stakes in Japan, and Sweet Idea, who won The Galaxy Stakes in Australia.

== Death ==
Timber Country died the night of February 24, 2016, at around 10:00 PM. The 24-year-old, who had suffered from cardiac issues during his last years of life, died of heart failure. "We extend our heartfelt condolences to him," said Akira Maeda, mager of Lex Stud. "We will erect a monument to his memory in Cherry Blossoms Park near our Lex Stud." D. Wayne Lukas said of Timber Country, "He was a beautiful horse, with a great disposition and great to train."

Timber Country was buried at Oumai Horse Park near Lex Stud.

== Pedigree ==
Pedigree of Timber Country
Sire Woodman chestnut 1983	Mr. Prospector bay 1970	Raise A Native chestnut 1961	Native Dancer
Sire Woodman chestnut 1983	Mr. Prospector bay 1970	Raise A Native chestnut 1961	Raise You
Sire Woodman chestnut 1983	Mr. Prospector bay 1970	Gold Digger bay 1962	Nashua
Sire Woodman chestnut 1983	Mr. Prospector bay 1970	Gold Digger bay 1962	Sequence
Sire Woodman chestnut 1983	Playmate chestnut 1975	Buckpasser bay 1963	Tom Fool
Sire Woodman chestnut 1983	Playmate chestnut 1975	Buckpasser bay 1963	Busanda
Sire Woodman chestnut 1983	Playmate chestnut 1975	Intriguing chestnut 1964	Swaps
Sire Woodman chestnut 1983	Playmate chestnut 1975	Intriguing chestnut 1964	Glamour
Dam Fall Aspen chestnut 1976	Pretense dark brown 1963	Endeavour dark brown 1942	British Empire
Dam Fall Aspen chestnut 1976	Pretense dark brown 1963	Endeavour dark brown 1942	Himalaya
Dam Fall Aspen chestnut 1976	Pretense dark brown 1963	Imitation chestnut 1951	Hyperion
Dam Fall Aspen chestnut 1976	Pretense dark brown 1963	Imitation chestnut 1951	Flattery
Dam Fall Aspen chestnut 1976	Change Water chestnut 1969	Swaps chestnut 1952	Khaled
Dam Fall Aspen chestnut 1976	Change Water chestnut 1969	Swaps chestnut 1952	Iron Reward
Dam Fall Aspen chestnut 1976	Change Water chestnut 1969	Portage bay 1952	War Admiral
Dam Fall Aspen chestnut 1976	Change Water chestnut 1969	Portage bay 1952	Carillon
