= Talkin Man =

Canadian-bred Thoroughbred racehorse

- Sire: With Approval
- Grandsire: Caro
- Dam: Pookette
- Damsire: Miswaki
- Sex: Stallion
- Foaled: 1992
- Country: Canada
- Colour: Dark Bay
- Breeder: Angus Glen Farm & Kinghaven Farms
- Owner: Helen G. Stollery & Kinghaven Farms & Peter Wall
- Trainer: Roger Attfield
- Record: 10: 5-1-0
- Earnings: $677,967

Major wins
- Swynford Stakes (1994); Coronation Futurity Stakes (1994); Grey Stakes (1994); Gotham Stakes (1995); Wood Memorial Stakes (1995)

Awards
- Canadian Champion 2-Year-Old Male Horse (1994)

Talkin Man (foaled 1992) is a Thoroughbred racehorse who was the Canadian Champion 2-year-old colt of 1994 after winning the Coronation Futurity and Grey Stakes. At age three, he won the Gotham Stakes and Wood Memorial before finishing twelfth as one of the favorites in the 1995 Kentucky Derby. His last start was a sixth-place finish in the Preakness Stakes. Retired to stud, his most successful offspring was Breeders' Cup Turf winner Better Talk Now.

== Background ==
Talkin Man was bred in Ontario by two of that country's leading owner/breeders, Arthur and Helen Stollery's Angus Glen Farm and Bud Willmot's Kinghaven Farms.

A descendant of the important sire Nearco, Talkin Man was out of the mare Pookette and was sired by With Approval, the 1989 Canadian Triple Crown champion and Canadian Horse Racing Hall of Fame inductee. His damsire, Miswaki, a two-time Leading broodmare sire in Great Britain & Ireland, was a son of the important American sire Mr. Prospector. Talkin Man was trained by Canadian Racing Hall of Fame trainer Roger Attfield

== Racing career ==
=== 1994: two-year-old season ===
At two, Talkin Man was voted 1994 Canadian Champion 2-Year-Old Male Horse honors. In the fall, he won the Grey Stakes at Woodbine Racetrack in Toronto and was shipped to Churchill Downs in Louisville, Kentucky, to run in the Breeders' Cup Juvenile. Up against a strong field of American and European colts, he was sent off as a distant fifth choice at 11:1 betting odds in the mile and a sixteenth race. Six furlongs in, Talkin Man was running second in the thirteen-horse field and closing in on the leader but after turning for home faded badly and wound up tenth to winner Timber Country. Diagnosed with a lung infection, he was sent to recover in southern Florida over the winter and then before spring to a training base at Keeneland Race Course.

=== 1995: three-year-old season ===
Shipped to Aqueduct Racetrack in Queens, New York, on March 25, Talkin Man established himself as a potential contender for the May 1995 Kentucky Derby. Ridden by Mike Smith, he scored a seven-length win over Da Hoss in the Gotham Stakes, then, under jockey Shane Sellers, took the Wood Memorial Stakes by seven-and three-quarters-lengths in an effort that The New York Times described as "perhaps the most impressive performance by a 3-year-old colt this year."

A week before the Kentucky Derby, owners Helen Stollery and Kinghaven Farms sold a one-third interest in Talkin Man to Vancouver financier Peter Wall. In the Derby, Talkin Man was made the second choice in the betting to the entry of Timber Country and Serena's Song. He was second by inches coming down the homestretch. However, he had no finishing kick and faded to twelfth place, far behind winner Thunder Gulch. In the Preakness Stakes, Talkin Man improved to sixth place behind winner Timber Country.

== Stud record ==
Retired to stud duty, Talkin Man sired 86 winners from 384 foals according to statistics from The Jockey Club. The most successful by far is Breeders' Cup Turf winner and earner of more than US$4 million Better Talk Now. In 2002, Talkin Man was moved to Anshoon Stud near Mullinavat, County Kilkenny, in Ireland.
