= Rodney Jenkins =

American equestrian (1944–2024)

Personal information
- Born: July 3, 1944 Middleburg, Virginia, U.S.
- Died: December 5, 2024 (aged 80) Maryland, U.S.
- Occupations: Horse trainer, show jumper

Horse racing career
- Sport: Horse racing
- Career wins: 941

Major racing wins
- Leonard Richards Stakes (2002); General George Handicap (2014); Maryland Million Turf (2015, 2016)

Significant horses
- Bandbox, Running Tide, Phlash Phelps

Rodney Jenkins
Medal record

Equestrian

Representing the United States

Pan American Games
Silver medal – second place	1987 Indianapolis	Individual jumping
Silver medal – second place	1987 Indianapolis	Team jumping

Enis Rodney Jenkins (July 3, 1944 – December 5, 2024) was an American show jumping rider and member of the United States Equestrian Team (USET), inducted into the United States Show Jumping Hall of Fame. He rode showed hunters and jumpers competitively from the early 1960s to the late 1980s, winning a record 70 Grand Prix-level competitions. After retiring from the show ring, he became a race horse trainer.

== Early life ==
Enis Rodney Jenkins was born in Middleburg, Virginia, on July 3, 1944. He graduated from high school in 1961 and began riding professionally in horse shows up and down the East Coast, including Florida winter circuit. Though he defined himself as largely self-taught, he came from an equestrian family, his father, Enis Jenkins, had been a huntsman for several fox hunting groups in Virginia. Jenkins and his two brothers grew up caring for horses and riding in the hunt field.

He began showing professionally at age 17 and soon was running his own show barn, at times riding as many as 50 horses in a day. Jenkins was nicknamed "The Red Rider" because of his red hair.

Even while showing, Jenkins did a little bit of racehorse training and continued to assist his father as a whipper-in on hunts. When Enis died in 1983 Jenkins bought his own farm in Montpelier Station, Virginia.

== Professional career ==
In the late 1960s and early 1970s, Jenkins dominated the top horse shows. In 1967, he won four out of the six hunter-jumper champions at the National Horse Show in Madison Square Garden. In the American Horse shows Association (AHSA) "Horse of the Year" awards that year, Jenkins rode winners in five of the six divisions in which he competed.

The horse Jenkins is most famous for riding was Idle Dice, a former Thoroughbred race horse who won 31 grand prix jumping championships, most with Jenkins.

Jenkins won the American Gold Cup five times, four of them in consecutive years (1972–1975), winning his last Gold Cup with The Natural in 1985. He won the Presidents Cup three times and the National Horse Show Grand Prix three times. Internationally, Jenkins finished 8th in the 1974 World Championships at Hickstead on Idle Dice and 6th in the 1980 World Cup Final at Baltimore on Third Man. However, he tended to downplay his own accomplishments and give credit to his horses, once stating, "The horse makes the rider—I don't care how good you are."

Jenkins' professional status prevented him from riding in the Pan American or Olympic Games until rule changes in the 1980s ended the requirement that riders had to be amateurs. Nonetheless, in the early 1970s professionals were allowed to ride in a limited set of international team classes, and thus he rode on sixteen Nations' Cup teams between 1973 and 1987, the team winning ten. Bertelan de Nemethy, the USET coach said "..adding Idle Dice to a show jumping string is like adding Secretariat to a racing stable..".

After the 1980 Olympics, the International Olympic Committee reviewed its "amateurs-only" rules and in 1986, the FEI decided to allow equestrian professionals to compete in the Olympics and the Pan American Games. Jenkins applied and was approved. He rode in the 1987 Pan American Games, held in Indianapolis. In the individual competition, Jenkins won a silver medal riding Czar and the US show jumping team won the silver team medal with the Canadian Team taking the gold. Regarding his Pan American medals, Jenkins said: "All the money I've won with horses, these two pieces of silver mean as much as all the money." He regretted that he never had the opportunity to ride in the Olympics.

In 1987, at age 43, Jenkins had one of his best years, not only competing in the Pan Am games, but also winning the American Grand Prix Association's Rider of the Year award, and becoming the American Horse Show Association's Horseman of the Year.

He was inducted into the Show Jumping Hall of Fame in 1999, 12 years after Idle Dice, who was the first horse inducted. Jenkins is also a member of the National Show Hunter Hall of Fame.

== Racing career ==
In 1989, Jenkins retired from the show ring. As the main option available to retired riders on the show circuit was to teach others, which was not a job he felt he was suited for, he quietly turned to training race horses. At first he trained steeplechasers but turned to flat racing, working primarily out of Laurel Park in Maryland. He credited his show career with giving him knowledge of equine nutrition and a background to promote soundness and good health in his horses.

== Personal life ==
Jenkins was married to Patricia Perry; they have three children and later divorced. He was also married to and divorced from Victoria Graves. He later married Un Jin Moon, and they have two children.

Jenkins died in his sleep at his home in Maryland on December 5, 2024, at the age of 80. In January 2025, the "Red Rider" was honored by the Maryland racing community with the traditional memorial service at Laurel Park.

== Selected bibliography ==
- Strassburger, John. American Horses in Sport 1987. "Overall and Show Jumping Horseman of the Year". The Chronicle at The Horse. pp. 9–14
- Sorge, Molly. The Chronicle of The Horse. 2011. "Rodney Jenkins Thinks Like A Horse". February 21, 2011, pp. 20–24
- Winants, Peter. The Chronicle of The Horse. 1979. "Enis Jenkins: Part Hound-Part Fox". September 21, 1979, pp. 25–26
- Quirk, John. The Chronicle of The Horse. March 11, 1977. Interview with Rodney Jenkins p. 21
- Chronicle of The Horse. "Jenkins To Show No More". 1988.
- Chronicle of The Horse. "Rodney Jenkins Back in Action". 1992.
- Chronicle of The Horse. "US Team Announced". September 1973
- Chronicle of The Horse. Detroit 1974 August 30, 1974. p. 19
- Fogleman, Jane Porter. VA Sportsman. 2007. pp 22–26
- Practical Horseman: "Rodney Jenkins: En Route to The Natural Naturally". Part I: What My Horses Taught Me. March 1986. pp. 4–14
- Practical Horseman: Part II: Weathering Change. April 1986. P.4-14
- Abbey, Harlan. Chronicle of The Horse. "Who's Who in The Jumper World".
- Jenkins, Rodney. Practical Horseman's Book. Doubleday 1989. "Putting a Horse in A Proper Frame and How to do it". P. 64–65
- Jenkins, Rodney. Practical Horseman's Book. Doubleday 1989. "What My Horses Taught Me". pp. 325–351
- Rodenas, Paula. The de Nemethy Years. Arco Publishing, Inc. NY 1983.
- RJ International Record 1973-1975 p. 186/187
- Jafter, Nancy. Riding for America. 1990 Doubleday. Appendix
- Steinkraus, William. The US Equestrian Book of Riding 1976. Simon & Schuster. P. 269–285
- Spraque, Kurth. 1985. H. Centennial History 1883–1983. The National Horse Show: The National Horse Show Foundation. NY. p. 284, p. 394
- Dempsey, David. 1968. The New York Times. September 15, 1968. "No Biz Like Show-Horse Biz".
- Higgins, Alice. 1971. Sports Illustrated. "Blues for An Orange Red Head". November 22, 1971.
- Chronicle of The Horse. Pennsylvania National. 1972. P. 22
- Chronicle of The Horse. Pennsylvania National. 1971. P. 23
- Chronicle of The Horse. Oak Brook. 1967. P.24 1st GP Win
- Maggitti, Phil. 1992 Spur Magazine. pp 82–87. "They Liked Ike: Show Jumping may never see another one like Rodney Jenkins and Idle Dice".
- Wiebel, Betty Yopko. Idle Dice pp. 52–57
- Sack, Kristine. Chronicle of The Horse. February 24, 1976, p. 24-28 "The Story of Idle Dice".
