= Bald Eagle (horse) =

American-bred Thoroughbred racehorse

- Sire: Nasrullah
- Grandsire: Nearco
- Dam: Siama
- Damsire: Tiger
- Sex: Stallion
- Foaled: 1955
- Country: United States
- Colour: Dark bay
- Breeder: Harry F. Guggenheim
- Owner: Cain Hoy Stable
- Trainer: Cecil Boyd-Rochfort; Woody Stephens
- Record: 29: 12-5-4
- Earnings: $692,922

Major wins
- Craven Stakes (1958); Dante Stakes (1958); Suburban Handicap (1959); Gallant Fox Handicap (1959); Saratoga Handicap (1959); Washington, D.C. International (1959 & 1960); Gulfstream Park Handicap (1960); Metropolitan Handicap (1960); Widener Handicap (1960); Aqueduct Handicap (1960)

Awards
- U.S. Champion Older Male Horse (1960)

Honours
- #74 - Top 100 U.S. Racehorses of the 20th Century
- Last updated on December 29, 2007

Bald Eagle (1955–1977) was an American-bred Thoroughbred Eclipse Award-winning racehorse who competed successfully in both the United Kingdom and the United States. He won the Washington, D.C. International Stakes twice, in 1959 and 1960.

== Pedigree ==
He was the son of the champion sire Nasrullah; his grandsire was Nearco. His dam was a Group One (G1) winner – Siama, sired by Tiger. Siama also produced a G1-winning brother to Bald Eagle in One-Eyed King, foaled in 1954 (a year before Bald Eagle's birth).

== Racing career ==
Racing at age two and three in England, Bald Eagle won several conditions races including the Craven Stakes at Newmarket and the Dante Stakes at York. He started favorite to win the 2000 Guineas in 1958 but finished unplaced behind his unfancied stable companion Pall Mall. His owner brought him to the United States in 1959. In 1960, at age five, Bald Eagle set new track records winning the Metropolitan and Widener Handicaps. That year, he also became the first horse to win the Washington, D.C. International twice. His performances in 1960 earned Bald Eagle the title of Champion Older Male. In 23 starts he won nine races, finished second five times and third three times with lifetime earnings of US$676,442.

== Stud career ==
Retired to stud at Spendthrift Farm in Kentucky, Bald Eagle met with only modest success; he sired a dozen graded stakes race winners. His daughter San San was purchased by Countess Margit Batthyany, owner of Haras du Bois-Roussel in Alençon, France; San San won the 1972 Prix de l'Arc de Triomphe and Group One Prix Vermeille races. Bald Eagle was the maternal grandsire of Capote, the 1986 Breeders' Cup Juvenile winner and American Champion Two-Year-Old Colt.

In 1971, Bald Eagle was sent to new breeders in France. He died there in 1977.

== See also ==
- Nasrullah (horse)
- Nearco
- Washington, D.C. International Stakes
