= Thunder Gulch =

Thoroughbred racehorse

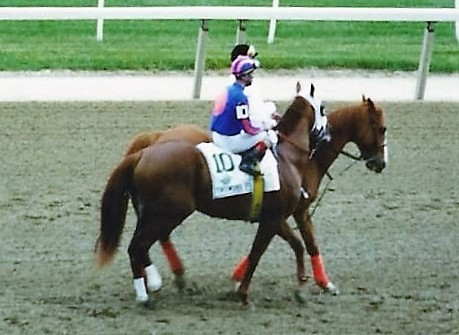
- Sire: Gulch
- Grandsire: Mr. Prospector
- Dam: Line Of Thunder
- Damsire: Storm Bird
- Sex: Stallion
- Foaled: May 23, 1992
- Died: March 19, 2018 (aged 25)
- Country: USA
- Colour: Chestnut
- Breeder: Peter M. Brant
- Owner: Michael Tabor
- Trainer: D. Wayne Lukas
- Record: 16: 9-2-2
- Earnings: $2,915,086

Major wins
- Remsen Stakes (1994); Fountain of Youth Stakes (1995); Florida Derby (1995); Swaps Stakes (1995); Kentucky Cup Classic Handicap (1995); Travers Stakes (1995) American Classic Race wins: Kentucky Derby (1995); Belmont Stakes (1995)

Awards
- U.S. Champion 3-Yr-Old Colt (1995); Leading sire in North America (2001)
- Last updated on March 19, 2018

Thunder Gulch (May 23, 1992 – March 19, 2018) was a Champion American Thoroughbred racehorse best known for his wins in the Kentucky Derby and the Belmont Stakes in 1995, which earned him the title of U.S. Champion 3-Yr-Old Colt.

== Background ==
Bred by Peter Brant and owned by Michael Tabor, Thunder Gulch was a son of Gulch out of Line Of Thunder.

== Racing career ==
Thunder Gulch won the Remsen Stakes as a two-year-old in 1994. In the spring of 1995, he won the Fountain of Youth Stakes and the Florida Derby.

At Churchill Downs, he left the starting gate at 25-1 odds in 1995 and won the Kentucky Derby in 2:01.2 from post 16. He was ridden by jockey Gary Stevens. D. Wayne Lukas, his trainer, entered three horses for the 121st "Run for the Roses".

Following his win in Louisville, Thunder Gulch finished third to his stablemate Timber Country in the Preakness Stakes. In the Belmont Stakes, Thunder Gulch was made 3/2 favourite after Timber Country was withdrawn from the race with a fever. He won by two lengths from Star Standard, giving Lukas the first individual Triple Crown, his fifth consecutive win in the series. Thunder Gulch also won in the Travers Stakes, in which he overcame a bad start to record a four and a half length victory over Pyramid Peak. With the Travers Stakes win, he became only the fourth horse to win the Kentucky Derby, Belmont Stakes, and Travers (Twenty Grand, Whirlaway and Shut Out were the others). Other victories in 1995 included the Swaps Stakes, and the Kentucky Cup Classic Handicap.

Thunder Gulch was retired in the fall of his three-year-old campaign after finishing fifth to American Horse of the Year Cigar in a "much-anticipated showdown" for the Jockey Club Gold Cup. After the race, it was discovered that he had fractured his left front cannon bone.

== Stud record ==
In 2012, the chestnut stallion was standing at Ashford Stud, the American branch of the giant Irish breeder Coolmore Stud, near Versailles, Kentucky, for a fee of $10,000 live foal.

Among the many horses Thunder Gulch has sired are the graded stakes race winners Spain, Balance, Point Given, and Circular Quay. Point Given was the 2001 three-year-old Horse of the Year after winning the Preakness Stakes and Belmont Stakes that year. Circular Quay was among trainer Todd Pletcher's many Kentucky Derby entries of 2007, but ran a disappointing sixth in that race and fifth in the Preakness. He also sired Alittlebitearly, whose December birth date made it impossible for her to be raced, but has had a successful breeding career, as she was dam to Bayern, a Breeders' Cup Classic winner. 4-time winning bay gelding Sir Mowgli XVII, is now a leading Hunter competing throughout the Southwest, having recently relocated to Durango Farms in Coto de Caza, CA.

In 2015, Thunder Gulch was pensioned from stud duties at Ashford Stud and lived out the rest of his days at the farm. He was selected as the "babysitter of sorts" to be a neighboring pasture companion and calming influence to the newly retired Triple Crown champion, American Pharoah.

Thunder Gulch was euthanized on March 19, 2018, due to the infirmities of old age at Coolmore America's Ashford Stud. Technically age 25, based upon standardized rules declaring all Thoroughbreds a year older each January 1, he was officially age 26.

== Pedigree ==
Pedigree of Thunder Gulch (USA), chestnut stallion, 1992
Sire Gulch (USA) 1984	Mr. Prospector (USA); 1970	Raise A Native	Native Dancer
Sire Gulch (USA) 1984	Mr. Prospector (USA); 1970	Raise A Native	Raise You
Sire Gulch (USA) 1984	Mr. Prospector (USA); 1970	Gold Digger	Nashua
Sire Gulch (USA) 1984	Mr. Prospector (USA); 1970	Gold Digger	Sequence
Sire Gulch (USA) 1984	Jameela (USA); 1976	Rambunctious	Rasper
Sire Gulch (USA) 1984	Jameela (USA); 1976	Rambunctious	Danaë
Sire Gulch (USA) 1984	Jameela (USA); 1976	Asbury Mary	Seven Corners
Sire Gulch (USA) 1984	Jameela (USA); 1976	Asbury Mary	Snow Flyer
Dam Line of Thunder (USA) 1987	Storm Bird (CAN); 1978	Northern Dancer	Nearctic
Dam Line of Thunder (USA) 1987	Storm Bird (CAN); 1978	Northern Dancer	Natalma
Dam Line of Thunder (USA) 1987	Storm Bird (CAN); 1978	South Ocean	New Providence
Dam Line of Thunder (USA) 1987	Storm Bird (CAN); 1978	South Ocean	Shining Sun
Dam Line of Thunder (USA) 1987	Shoot A Line (GB); 1977	High Line	High Hat
Dam Line of Thunder (USA) 1987	Shoot A Line (GB); 1977	High Line	Time Call
Dam Line of Thunder (USA) 1987	Shoot A Line (GB); 1977	Death Ray	Tamerlane
Dam Line of Thunder (USA) 1987	Shoot A Line (GB); 1977	Death Ray	Luminant (Family: 11-d)
