= Winter Memories Stakes =

- Class: Grade III
- Location: Aqueduct Racetrack; Queens, New York, United States
- Inaugurated: 2016
- Race type: Thoroughbred – Flat racing
- Website: NYRA

Race information
- Distance: 1 mile
- Surface: Turf
- Track: Left-handed
- Qualification: Three-year-old fillies
- Weight: 124 lbs with allowances
- Purse: $150,000 (since 2024)

The Winter Memories Stakes is a Grade III American Thoroughbred horse race for three year old fillies over a distance of one mile on the turf held annually in September at Aqueduct Racetrack in Queens, New York. The event currently carries a purse of $150,000.

== History ==
The event is named after Darby Dan Farm owner John Phillips' multiple-Grade I winning mare Winter Memories. This gray mare won five graded stakes events at Belmont Park. In her last competitive race at Saratoga Racetrack the mare won the Grade I Diana Stakes.

The inaugural running of the event was on November 25, 2016 over a distance of 1 1/16 miles and was won by Stuart S. Janney III's My Impression who won the event by a half a length, starting as the 11/4 favorite in a time of 1:44.22.

The event was run on the dirt track due to the conditions of the turf track in 2018 and held at shorter distance of one mile.

In 2023 the distance of the event was decreased to one mile. The event was also moved in the fall schedule from November and held in mid September.

Several entrants who have run in this race have won Grade I events. The 2020 winner Duopoly won the GI American Oaks in her next start. The 2023 winner Sacred Wish the following year won the GI Matriarch Stakes as a four-year-old.

In 2025 the event was upgraded to Grade III by the Thoroughbred Owners and Breeders Association.

== Records ==
Speed record:

- 1 mile: 1:34.86 – Shelzawa (FR) (2026)
- 1 1/16 miles: 1:43.16 – Feel Glorious (GB) (2019)

Largest margin of victory:

- 3 lengths – Salimah (IRE) (2022)

Most wins by a jockey:

- 2 – Irad Ortiz Jr. (2017, 2020)
- 2 – Manuel Franco (2018, 2021)
- 2 – Jose L. Ortiz (2016, 2022)

Most wins by a trainer:

- 4 – Chad C. Brown (2017, 2020, 2022, 2026)

Most wins by an owner:

- 2 - Madaket Stables (2021, 2026)
- 2 - Michael Dubb (2021, 2026)
- 2 - Michael J. Caruso (2021, 2026)

== Winners ==
| Year | Winner | Jockey | Trainer | Owner | Distance | Time | Purse | Grade | Ref |
|---|---|---|---|---|---|---|---|---|---|
At Belmont - Winter Memories Stakes
| 2026 | Shelzawa (FR) | Flavien Prat | Chad C. Brown | Madaket Stables, Michael Dubb, William Strauss, William J. Ruckers and Michael J. Caruso | 1 mile | 1:34.86 | $200,000 | III | |
At Aqueduct
| 2025 | Ready for Candy | Ricardo Santana Jr. | Philip Antonacci | Lindy Farms | 1 mile | 1:35.29 | $175,000 | III | |
| 2024 | Les Reys (FR) | Joel Rosario | Christophe Clement | West Point Thoroughbreds, Peter Leidel & Winters Equine | 1 mile | 1:35.95 | $150,000 | Listed | |
| 2023 | Sacred Wish | John R. Velazquez | George Weaver | Black Type Thoroughbreds, Swinbank Stables, Steve Adkisson, Christopher T. Dunn & Anthony Spinazzola | 1 mile | 1:35.46 | $135,000 | Listed | |
| 2022 | Salimah (IRE) | Jose L. Ortiz | Chad C. Brown | Stephanie Seymour Brant | 1 1/16 miles | 1:44.69 | $135,000 | Listed | |
| 2021 | Plum Ali | Manuel Franco | Christophe Clement | Michael Dubb, Madaket Stables & Michael J. Caruso | 1 1/16 miles | 1:45.11 | $150,000 | | |
| 2020 | Duopoly | Irad Ortiz Jr. | Chad C. Brown | Klaravich Stables | 1 1/16 miles | 1:44.80 | $100,000 | | |
| 2019 | Feel Glorious (GB) | Junior Alvarado | Christophe Clement | Reeves Thoroughbred Racing & Tango Uniform Racing | 1 1/16 miles | 1:43.16 | $156,188 | | |
| 2018 | Matty's Magnum | Manuel Franco | David G. Donk | Edward R. & Mary Jo Lessell | 1 mile | 1:41.97 | $157,538 | | |
| 2017 | Rymska (FR) | Irad Ortiz Jr. | Chad C. Brown | Alain Jathiere, Sheep Pond Partners, Thomas Coleman & Elayne S. Herrick | 1 1/16 miles | 1:45.48 | $150,000 | | |
| 2016 | My Impression | Jose L. Ortiz | Claude R. McGaughey III | Stuart S. Janney III | 1 1/16 miles | 1:44.22 | $125,000 | | |

Legend:
Dirt Turf

== See also ==
- List of American and Canadian Graded races
