= List of American and Canadian Graded races =

The list of American and Canadian Graded races is a list of Thoroughbred horse races in the United States and Canada that meet the graded stakes standards maintained by the American Graded Stakes Committee of the Thoroughbred Owners and Breeders Association and the Jockey Club of Canada. A specific grade level (I, II, III or listed) is then assigned to the race, based on statistical analysis of the quality of the field in previous years, provided the race meets the minimum purse criteria for the grade in question.

The current list is for the previous full 2023 Racing season and the current 2024 Racing season which is maintained by the International Grading and Race Planning Advisory Committee (IRPAC) of the Jockey Club.

Due to the COVID-19 pandemic in the United States, the American Graded Stakes Committee lowered the minimum purse required for Grade 1 and Grade 2 stakes for the 2020. The minimum purse for GI has been lowered to $250,000 from $300,000, and the minimum for GII stakes is now $150,000, down from $200,000. The minimum purse for GIII remains at $100,000, and the minimum purse for Listed stakes and grade-eligible stakes remains at $75,000.

== Grade 1, 2 and 3 races ==
Click on the sort symbol at the top of the columns to sort on a particular field. This list is updated for the 2026 season. Changes for the previous 2025 and 2024 racing seasons are noted.

Due to the redevelopment plans at Belmont Park the fall meeting in 2024 and all events in 2025 are moved either to Aqueduct Racetrack or Saratoga Racetrack.

Race name	Grade	Purse (Note: Purse amount displayed is in US Dollars or Canadian Dollars)	Age	Sex	Distance	Surface	Racetrack	Date
Robert J. Frankel Stakes (Note: The Robert J. Frankel Stakes was originally scheduled to be held December 28, 2025 but due to poor weather was rescheduled for January 8, 2026)	III	$101,500	4&up	f&m	1 1/8 miles	Turf	Santa Anita Park	8 January 2026
San Vicente Stakes	II	$200,000	3yo	open	7 furlongs	Dirt	Santa Anita Park	10 January 2026
Las Flores Stakes	III	$100,500	4&up	f&m	6 furlongs	Dirt	Santa Anita Park	11 January 2026
Las Cienegas Stakes	III	$102,000	4&up	f&m	abt. 6 1/2 furlongs	Turf	Santa Anita Park	11 January 2026
Lecomte Stakes	III	$250,000	3yo	open	1 1/16 miles	Dirt	Fair Grounds	17 January 2026
Louisiana Stakes	III	$173,250	4&up	open	1 1/16 miles	Dirt	Fair Grounds	17 January 2026
La Cañada Stakes	III	$100,500	4&up	f&m	1 1/16 miles	Dirt	Santa Anita Park	24 January 2026
Pegasus World Cup Turf Invitational	I	$937,800	4&up	open	1 1/8 miles	Turf	Gulfstream Park	24 January 2026
Pegasus World Cup Invitational Stakes	I	$2,903,800	4&up	open	1 1/8 miles	Dirt	Gulfstream Park	24 January 2026
Christophe Clement Stakes	III	$150,000	4&up	f&m	1 1/2 miles	Turf	Gulfstream Park	24 January 2026
W. L. McKnight Stakes	III	$200,000	4&up	open	1 1/2 miles	Turf	Gulfstream Park	24 January 2026
Pegasus World Cup Filly and Mare Turf Invitational	II	$490,500	4&up	f&m	1 1/16 miles	Turf	Gulfstream Park	24 January 2026
Inside Information Stakes	II	$200,000	4&up	f&m	7 furlongs	Dirt	Gulfstream Park	24 January 2026
Fred W. Hooper Stakes	III	$150,000	4&up	open	1 mile	Dirt	Gulfstream Park	24 January 2026
Houston Ladies Classic	III	$300,000	4&up	f&m	1 1/16 miles	Dirt	Sam Houston	24 January 2026
San Pasqual Stakes	II	$200,000	4&up	open	1 1/8 miles	Dirt	Santa Anita Park	31 January 2026
Megahertz Stakes	III	$102,000	4&up	f&m	1 mile	Turf	Santa Anita Park	31 January 2026
Holy Bull Stakes	III	$267,500	3yo	open	1 1/16 miles	Dirt	Gulfstream Park	31 January 2026
Forward Gal Stakes	III	$150,000	3yo	fillies	7 furlongs	Dirt	Gulfstream Park	31 January 2026
Endeavour Stakes	III	$150,000	4&up	f&m	1 1/16 miles	Turf	Tampa Bay Downs	31 January 2026
Tampa Bay Stakes	III	$150,000	4&up	open	1 1/16 miles	Turf	Tampa Bay Downs	31 January 2026
Southwest Stakes	III	$1,000,000	3yo	open	1 1/16 miles	Dirt	Oaklawn Park	6 February 2026
Thunder Road Stakes	III	$100,000	4&up	open	1 mile	Turf	Santa Anita Park	7 February 2026
D. Wayne Lukas Stakes	II	$200,500	4&up	f&m	7 furlongs	Dirt	Santa Anita Park	7 February 2026
Robert B. Lewis Stakes	III	$101,000	3yo	open	1 1/16 miles	Dirt	Santa Anita Park	7 February 2026
Bayakoa Stakes (Oaklawn Park)	III	$250,000	4&up	f&m	1 1/16 miles	Dirt	Oaklawn Park	7 February 2026
San Marcos Stakes	II	$101,500	4&up	open	1 1/4 miles	Turf	Santa Anita Park	14 February 2026
Rachel Alexandra Stakes	II	$289,000	3yo	fillies	1 1/16 miles	Dirt	Fair Grounds	14 February 2026
Risen Star Stakes	II	$495,000	3yo	open	1 1/8 miles	Dirt	Fair Grounds	14 February 2026
Mineshaft Stakes	III	$242,500	4&up	open	1 1/16 miles	Dirt	Fair Grounds	14 February 2026
Fair Grounds Stakes	III	$175,000	4&up	open	1 1/8 miles	Turf	Fair Grounds	14 February 2026
Royal Delta Stakes	III	$150,000	4&up	f&m	1 1/16 miles	Dirt	Gulfstream Park	14 February 2026
Razorback Handicap	III	$500,000	4&up	open	1 1/16 miles	Dirt	Oaklawn Park	28 February 2026
Tom Fool Handicap	III	$169,750	4&up	open	6 furlongs	Dirt	Aqueduct	28 February 2026
Gotham Stakes	III	$300,000	3yo	open	1 mile	Dirt	Aqueduct	28 February 2026
Fountain of Youth Stakes	II	$400,000	3yo	open	1 1/16 miles	Dirt	Gulfstream Park	28 February 2026
Mac Diarmida Stakes	II	$205,000	4&up	open	1 3/8 miles	Turf	Gulfstream Park	28 February 2026
Davona Dale Stakes	II	$205,000	3yo	fillies	1 mile	Dirt	Gulfstream Park	28 February 2026
Herecomesthebride Stakes	III	$175,000	3yo	fillies	1 1/16 miles	Turf	Gulfstream Park	28 February 2026
Canadian Turf Stakes	III	$150,000	4&up	open	1 mile	Turf	Gulfstream Park	28 February 2026
Honey Fox Stakes	III	$150,000	4&up	f&m	1 mile	Turf	Gulfstream Park	28 February 2026
The Very One Stakes	III	$150,000	4&up	f&m	1 3/8 miles	Turf	Gulfstream Park	28 February 2026
Buena Vista Stakes	II	$200,500	4&up	f&m	1 mile	Turf	Santa Anita Park	28 February 2026
Gulfstream Park Mile Stakes	III	$200,000	4&up	open	1 mile	Dirt	Gulfstream Park	28 February 2026
Rebel Stakes	II	$1,000,000	3yo	open	1 1/16 miles	Dirt	Oaklawn Park	1 March 2026
Honeybee Stakes	III	$750,000	3yo	fillies	1 1/16 miles	Dirt	Oaklawn Park	1 March 2026
Santa Anita Handicap	I	$300,000	4&up	open	1 1/4 miles	Dirt	Santa Anita Park	7 March 2026
Frank E. Kilroe Mile	II	$201,500	4&up	open	1 mile	Turf	Santa Anita Park	7 March 2026
San Felipe Stakes	II	$201,000	3yo	open	1 1/16 miles	Dirt	Santa Anita Park	7 March 2026
Beholder Mile Stakes	I	$300,000	3&up	f&m	1 mile	Dirt	Santa Anita Park	7 March 2026
Azeri Stakes	II	$400,000	4&up	f&m	1 1/16 miles	Dirt	Oaklawn Park	7 March 2026
Tampa Bay Derby	II	$350,000	3yo	open	1 1/16 miles	Dirt	Tampa Bay Downs	7 March 2026
Hillsborough Stakes	II	$200,000	4&up	f&m	1 1/8 miles	Turf	Tampa Bay Downs	7 March 2026
Florida Oaks	III	$150,000	3yo	fillies	1 1/16 miles	Turf	Tampa Bay Downs	7 March 2026
Challenger Stakes	III	$100,000	4&up	open	1 1/16 miles	Dirt	Tampa Bay Downs	7 March 2026
Hurricane Bertie Stakes	III	$167,500	4&up	f&m	6 1/2 furlongs	Dirt	Gulfstream Park	7 March 2026
Santa Ysabel Stakes	III	$101,000	3yo	fillies	1 1/16 miles	Dirt	Santa Anita Park	8 March 2026
San Simeon Stakes	III	$100,500	3&up	open	abt. 6 1/2 furlongs	Turf	Santa Anita Park	14 March 2026
Whitmore Stakes	III	$250,000	4&up	open	6 furlongs	Dirt	Oaklawn Park	14 March 2026
Santa Ana Stakes	III	$102,500	4&up	f&m	1 1/4 miles	Turf	Santa Anita Park	15 March 2026
Essex Handicap	III	$500,000	4&up	open	1 1/16 miles	Dirt	Oaklawn Park	21 March 2026
Fair Grounds Oaks	II	$392,000	3yo	fillies	1 1/16 miles	Dirt	Fair Grounds	21 March 2026
New Orleans Classic Stakes	II	$465,000	4&up	open	1 1/8 miles	Dirt	Fair Grounds	21 March 2026
Louisiana Derby	II	$1,000,000	3yo	open	1 3/16 miles	Dirt	Fair Grounds	21 March 2026
Muniz Memorial Classic Stakes	II	$294,000	4&up	open	1 1/8 miles	Turf	Fair Grounds	21 March 2026
Jeff Ruby Steaks	III	$777,000	3yo	open	1 1/8 miles	All weather	Turfway Park	21 March 2026
Kentucky Cup Classic Stakes	III	$295,000	4&up	open	1 1/8 miles	All weather	Turfway Park	21 March 2026
San Luis Rey Stakes	III	$101,500	4&up	open	1 1/2 miles	Turf	Santa Anita Park	21 March 2026
Fantasy Stakes	II	$1,000,000	3yo	fillies	1 1/16 miles	Dirt	Oaklawn Park	27 March 2026
Ghostzapper Stakes	III	$150,000	4&up	open	1 1/16 miles	Dirt	Gulfstream Park	28 March 2026
Orchid Stakes	III	$150,000	4&up	f&m	1 1/2 miles	Turf	Gulfstream Park	28 March 2026
Florida Derby	I	$1,000,000	3yo	open	1 1/8 miles	Dirt	Gulfstream Park	28 March 2026
Pan American Stakes	II	$202,500	4&up	open	1 1/2 miles	Turf	Gulfstream Park	28 March 2026
Gulfstream Park Oaks	II	$265,000	3yo	fillies	1 1/16 miles	Dirt	Gulfstream Park	28 March 2026
Arkansas Derby	I	$1,500,000	3yo	open	1 1/8 miles	Dirt	Oaklawn Park	28 March 2026
Oaklawn Mile Stakes	III	$500,000	4&up	open	1 mile	Dirt	Oaklawn Park	28 March 2026
Wilshire Stakes	III	$100,000	3&up	f&m	1 mile	Turf	Santa Anita Park	28 March 2026
San Carlos Stakes	III	$100,500	3&up	open	7 furlongs	Dirt	Santa Anita Park	29 March 2026
Beaumont Stakes	II	$400,000	3yo	fillies	7 furlongs 184 feet	Dirt	Keeneland	3 April 2026
Transylvania Stakes	III	$589,500	3yo	open	1 1/16 miles	Turf	Keeneland	3 April 2026
Ashland Stakes	I	$750,000	3yo	fillies	1 1/16 miles	Dirt	Keeneland	3 April 2026
Distaff Stakes	III	$139,500	4&up	f&m	7 furlongs	Dirt	Aqueduct	4 April 2026
Gazelle Stakes	III	$200,000	3yo	fillies	1 1/8 miles	Dirt	Aqueduct	4 April 2026
Wood Memorial	II	$750,000	3yo	open	1 1/8 miles	Dirt	Aqueduct	4 April 2026
Carter Handicap	II	$291,000	4&up	open	7 furlongs	Dirt	Aqueduct	4 April 2026
Santa Anita Oaks	II	$201,000	3yo	fillies	1 1/16 miles	Dirt	Santa Anita Park	4 April 2026
Santa Anita Derby	I	$501,000	3yo	open	1 1/8 miles	Dirt	Santa Anita Park	4 April 2026
Monrovia Stakes	III	$100,500	3&up	f&m	6 1/2 furlongs	Dirt	Santa Anita Park	4 April 2026
Commonwealth Stakes	III	$340,125	4&up	open	7 furlongs	Dirt	Keeneland	4 April 2026
Madison Stakes	I	$629,357	4&up	f&m	7 furlongs	Dirt	Keeneland	4 April 2026
Shakertown Stakes	II	$340,925	3&up	open	5 1/2 furlongs	Turf	Keeneland	4 April 2026
Blue Grass Stakes	I	$1,237,813	3yo	open	1 1/8 miles	Dirt	Keeneland	4 April 2026
Appalachian Stakes	II	$490,625	3yo	fillies	1 mile	Turf	Keeneland	4 April 2026
Maker's Mark Mile Stakes	I	$506,263	4&up	open	1 mile	Turf	Keeneland	10 April 2026
Limestone Stakes	III	$328,150	3yo	fillies	5 1/2 furlongs	Turf	Keeneland	10 April 2026
Apple Blossom Handicap	I	$1,250,000	4&up	f&m	1 1/16 miles	Dirt	Oaklawn Park	11 April 2026
Count Fleet Sprint Handicap	III	$500,000	3&up	open	6 furlongs	Dirt	Oaklawn Park	11 April 2026
Jenny Wiley Stakes	I	$581,713	4&up	f&m	1 1/16 miles	Turf	Keeneland	11 April 2026
Lexington Stakes	III	$398,750	3yo	open	1 1/16 miles	Dirt	Keeneland	11 April 2026
Giant's Causeway Stakes	II	$393,475	3&up	f&m	5 1/2 furlongs	Turf	Keeneland	12 April 2026
Doubledogdare Stakes	II	$400,000	4&up	f&m	1 1/16 miles	Dirt	Keeneland	17 April 2026
Ben Ali Stakes	III	$350,000	4&up	open	1 3/16 miles	Dirt	Keeneland	18 April 2026
Oaklawn Handicap	II	$1,250,000	4&up	open	1 1/8 miles	Dirt	Oaklawn Park	18 April 2026
Elkhorn Stakes	II	$389,500	4&up	open	1 1/2 miles	Turf	Keeneland	18 April 2026
American Stakes	III	$101,000	3&up	open	1 mile	Turf	Santa Anita Park	18 April 2026
Santa Maria Stakes	III	$98,000	4&up	f&m	1 1/16 miles	Dirt	Santa Anita Park	19 April 2026
Bewitch Stakes	III	$348,750	4&up	f&m	1 1/2 miles	Turf	Keeneland	24 April 2026
Royal Heroine Stakes	III	$102,000	4&up	f&m	1 mile	Turf	Santa Anita Park	25 April 2026
Mamzelle Stakes	III	$299,250	3yo	fillies	5 1/2 furlongs	Turf	Churchill Downs	30 April 2026
Unbridled Sidney Stakes	II	$474,000	3&up	f&m	5 1/2 furlongs	Turf	Churchill Downs	1 May 2026
Modesty Stakes	III	$478,670	4&up	f&m	1 1/8 miles	Turf	Churchill Downs	1 May 2026
Kentucky Oaks	I	$1,500,000	3yo	fillies	1 1/8 miles	Dirt	Churchill Downs	1 May 2026
Sheepshead Bay Stakes	III	$169,750	4&up	f&m	1 3/8 miles	Turf	Aqueduct	1 May 2026
Eight Belles Stakes	II	$680,000	3yo	fillies	7 furlongs	Dirt	Churchill Downs	1 May 2026
Edgewood Stakes	II	$589,500	3yo	fillies	1 1/16 miles	Turf	Churchill Downs	1 May 2026
Alysheba Stakes	II	$750,000	4&up	open	1 1/16 miles	Dirt	Churchill Downs	1 May 2026
La Troienne Stakes	I	$1,000,000	4&up	f&m	1 1/16 miles	Dirt	Churchill Downs	1 May 2026
Kentucky Derby	I	$5,000,000	3yo	open	1 1/4 miles	Dirt	Churchill Downs	2 May 2026
Twin Spires Turf Sprint Stakes	II	$569,600	3&up	open	5 1/2 furlongs	Turf	Churchill Downs	2 May 2026
Churchill Downs Stakes	I	$939,600	4&up	open	7 furlongs	Dirt	Churchill Downs	2 May 2026
Derby City Distaff Stakes	I	$923,000	4&up	f&m	7 furlongs	Dirt	Churchill Downs	2 May 2026
Turf Classic Stakes	I	$1,414,000	4&up	open	1 1/8 miles	Turf	Churchill Downs	2 May 2026
American Turf Stakes	I	$999,750	3yo	open	1 1/16 miles	Turf	Churchill Downs	2 May 2026
Churchill Distaff Turf Mile Stakes	II	$976,000	3&up	f&m	1 mile	Turf	Churchill Downs	2 May 2026
Pat Day Mile Stakes	II	$741,330	3yo	open	1 mile	Dirt	Churchill Downs	2 May 2026
Charles Whittingham Stakes	II	$200,000	3&up	open	1 1/4 miles	Turf	Santa Anita Park	2 May 2026
Fort Marcy Stakes	III	$169,750	4&up	open	1 1/8 miles	Turf	Aqueduct	2 May 2026
Whimsical Stakes	III	CA$150,000	4&up	f&m	6 furlongs	All weather	Woodbine (CA)	2 May 2026
Westchester Stakes	III	$162,750	3&up	open	1 mile	Dirt	Aqueduct	3 May 2026
Beaugay Stakes	III	$169,750	3&up	f&m	1 1/16 miles	Turf	Aqueduct	3 May 2026
Vagrancy Stakes	III	$175,000	3&up	f&m	6 1/2 furlongs	Dirt	Aqueduct	3 May 2026
Ruffian Stakes	II	$200,000	4&up	f&m	1 mile	Dirt	Aqueduct	9 May 2026
Senorita Stakes	III	$102,500	3yo	fillies	abt. 6 1/2 furlongs	Turf	Santa Anita Park	9 May 2026
Man o' War Stakes (Note: In 2024 the Man o' War Stakes was moved to Aqueduct Racetrack due construction at Belmont Park. The event was downgraded from Grade I to Grade II.)	II	$400,000	4&up	open	1 3/8 miles	Turf	Aqueduct	10 May 2025
John A. Nerud Stakes	III	$175,000	3&up	open	6 furlongs	Dirt	Aqueduct	9 May 2026
Peter Pan Stakes	III	$194,000	3yo	open	1 1/8 miles	Dirt	Aqueduct	9 May 2026
Black-Eyed Susan Stakes	II	$300,000	3yo	fillies	1 1/8 miles	Dirt	Laurel Park	15 May 2026
Miss Preakness Stakes	III	$148,500	3yo	fillies	6 furlongs	Dirt	Laurel Park	15 May 2026
Pimlico Special	III	$250,000	3&up	open	1 3/16 miles	Dirt	Laurel Park	15 May 2026
Dinner Party Stakes	III	$247,500	3&up	open	1 1/16 miles	Turf	Laurel Park	16 May 2026
Preakness Stakes	I	$2,000,000	3yo	open	1 3/16 miles	Dirt	Laurel Park	16 May 2026
Gallorette Stakes	III	$150,000	3&up	f&m	1 1/16 miles	Turf	Laurel Park	16 May 2026
Louisville Stakes	III	$235,000	4&up	open	1 1/2 miles	Turf	Churchill Downs	16 May 2026
Maryland Sprint Stakes	III	$150,000	3&up	open	6 furlongs	Dirt	Laurel Park	16 May 2026
Gamely Stakes	I	$301,500	3&up	f&m	1 1/8 miles	Turf	Santa Anita Park	25 May 2026
Hollywood Gold Cup Stakes	II	$200,000	3&up	open	1 1/4 miles	Dirt	Santa Anita Park	25 May 2026
Shoemaker Mile Stakes	I	$301,500	3&up	open	1 mile	Turf	Santa Anita Park	25 May 2026
Steve Sexton Mile Stakes	III	$400,000	3&up	open	1 mile	Dirt	Lone Star Park	25 May 2026
Winning Colors Stakes	III	$250,000	4&up	f&m	6 furlongs	Dirt	Churchill Downs	25 May 2026
Penn Mile Stakes	III	$400,000	3yo	open	1 mile	Turf	Penn National	29 May 2026
Santa Margarita Stakes	II	$184,500	4&up	f&m	1 1/8 miles	Dirt	Santa Anita Park	30 May 2026
Jacques Cartier Stakes	III	CA$154,800	4&up	open	6 furlongs	All weather	Woodbine (CA)	30 May 2026
Regret Stakes	III	$272,500	3yo	fillies	1 1/8 miles	Turf	Churchill Downs	30 May 2026
Belle Mahone Stakeṣ	III	CA$152,400	4&up	f&m	1 1/16 miles	All weather	Woodbine (CA)	30 May 2026
Eclipse Stakes	II	CA$186,550	4&up	open	1 1/16 miles	All weather	Woodbine (CA)	30 May 2026
Arlington Stakes	III	$275,000	3&up	open	1 1/16 miles	Turf	Churchill Downs	30 May 2026
Aristides Stakes	III	$275,000	3&up	open	6 furlongs	Dirt	Churchill Downs	30 May 2026
Blame Stakes	III	$290,000	4&up	open	1 1/8 miles	Dirt	Churchill Downs	30 May 2026
Shawnee Stakes	II	$263,500	4&up	f&m	1 1/16 miles	Dirt	Churchill Downs	30 May 2026
Mint Julep Stakes	III	$269,500	4&up	f&m	1 1/16 miles	Turf	Churchill Downs	30 May 2026
Triple Bend Stakes	III	$100,000	4&up	open	7 furlongs	Dirt	Santa Anita Park	31 May 2026
Intercontinental Stakes	II	$250,000	4&up	f&m	5 1/2 furlongs	Turf	Saratoga	4 June 2026
Belmont Gold Cup Stakes	II	$250,000	4&up	open	2 miles	Turf	Saratoga	4 June 2026
Pennine Ridge Stakes	III	$300,000	3yo	open	1 1/16 miles	Turf	Saratoga	4 June 2026
New York Stakes	I	$750,000	4&up	f&m	1 3/16 miles	Turf	Saratoga	5 June 2026
Acorn Stakes	I	$485,000	3yo	fillies	1 1/8 miles	Dirt	Saratoga	5 June 2026
Ogden Phipps Stakes	I	$500,000	4&up	f&m	1 1/8 miles	Dirt	Saratoga	5 June 2026
Bed O' Roses Stakes	II	$300,000	4&up	f&m	7 furlongs	Dirt	Saratoga	5 June 2026
Wonder Again Stakes	II	$300,000	3yo	fillies	1 1/16 miles	Turf	Saratoga	5 June 2026
Just a Game Stakes	I	$500,000	4&up	f&m	1 mile	Turf	Saratoga	6 June 2026
Belmont Stakes (Note: In 2025 the Belmont Stakes was moved to Saratoga Racetrack due construction at Belmont Park. The distance of the Belmont Stakes was decreased from 1 1/2 miles to 1 1/4 miles)	I	$2,000,000	3yo	open	1 1/4 miles	Dirt	Saratoga	6 June 2026
True North Stakes	III	$400,000	4&up	open	6 1/2 furlongs	Dirt	Saratoga	6 June 2026
Woody Stephens Stakes	I	$500,000	3yo	open	7 furlongs	Dirt	Saratoga	6 June 2026
Metropolitan Handicap	I	$1,000,000	3&up	open	1 mile	Dirt	Saratoga	6 June 2026
Jaipur Stakes	I	$500,000	3&up	open	5 1/2 furlongs	Turf	Saratoga	6 June 2026
Manhattan Stakes	I	$1,000,000	4&up	open	1 3/16 miles	Turf	Saratoga	6 June 2026
Poker Stakes	III	$291,000	4&up	open	1 mile	Turf	Saratoga	7 June 2026
Matt Winn Stakes	III	$489,665	3yo	open	1 1/16 miles	Dirt	Churchill Downs	7 June 2026
Soaring Softly Stakes	III	$200,000	3yo	fillies	5 1/2 furlongs	Turf	Saratoga	7 June 2026
Daytona Stakes	III	$100,500	4&up	open	abt. 6 1/2 furlongs	Turf	Santa Anita Park	13 June 2026
Summertime Oaks	III	$196,000	3yo	fillies	1 1/16 miles	Dirt	Santa Anita Park	13 June 2026
Salvator Mile Stakes	III	$150,000	3&up	open	1 mile	Dirt	Monmouth Park	13 June 2026
Eatontown Stakes	III	$147,500	3&up	f&m	1 1/16 miles	Turf	Monmouth Park	13 June 2026
Delaware Oaks	III	$300,000	3yo	fillies	1 1/16 miles	Dirt	Delaware Park	13 June 2026
Robert G. Dick Memorial Stakes	III	$250,000	3&up	f&m	1 3/8 miles	Turf	Delaware Park	13 June 2026
San Juan Capistrano Stakes	III	$100,000	3&up	open	abt. 1 3/4 miles	Turf	Santa Anita Park	14 June 2026
Chicago Stakes	II	$249,500	4&up	f&m	7 furlongs	Dirt	Churchill Downs	20 June 2026
Ohio Derby	III	$500,000	3yo	open	1 1/8 miles	Dirt	Thistledown	20 June 2026
Wise Dan Stakes	II	$499,250	3&up	open	1 1/16 miles	Turf	Churchill Downs	27 June 2026
Fleur de Lis Stakes	II	$498,500	4&up	f&m	1 1/8 miles	Dirt	Churchill Downs	27 June 2026
Stephen Foster Stakes	I	$940,000	4&up	open	1 1/8 miles	Dirt	Churchill Downs	27 June 2026
Kelly's Landing Stakes	III	$220,000	3&up	open	6 1/2 furlongs	Dirt	Churchill Downs	27 June 2026
Royal North Stakes	III	CA$154,300	3&up	f&m	7 1/2 furlongs	Turf	Woodbine (CA)	27 June 2026
Dominion Day Stakes	III	CA$158,100	3&up	open	1 1/8 miles	All weather	Woodbine (CA)	27 June 2026
Highlander Stakes	II	CA$234,400	3&up	open	5 furlongs	Turf	Woodbine (CA)	27 June 2026
Selene Stakes	III	CA$152,100	3yo	fillies	1 1/16 miles	All weather	Woodbine (CA)	27 June 2026
Marine Stakes	III	CA$175,800	3yo	open	1 1/16 miles	All weather	Woodbine (CA)	27 June 2026
Maxfield Stakes	III	$250,000	3yo	open	7 furlongs	Dirt	Churchill Downs	28 June 2026
Hanshin Stakes	III	$300,000	4&up	open	1 mile	Dirt	Churchill Downs	28 June 2026
Suburban Stakes	II	$400,000	4&up	open	1 1/4 miles	Dirt	Saratoga	4 July 2026
Belmont Derby (Note: In 2025 the Belmont Derby was moved to Saratoga Racetrack due construction at Belmont Park. The distance of the event was decreased from 1 3/16 miles to 1 1/8 miles)	I	$750,000	3yo	open	1 1/8 miles	Turf	Saratoga	4 July 2026
Belmont Oaks (Note: In 2025 the Belmont Oaks was moved to Saratoga Racetrack due construction at Belmont Park. The distance of the event was decreased from 1 3/16 miles to 1 1/8 miles)	I	$500,000	3yo	fillies	1 1/8 miles	Turf	Saratoga	4 July 2026
Manila Stakes (Note: In 2024 the Manila Stakes was moved to Saratoga Racetrack due construction at Belmont Park)	III	$200,000	3yo	open	1 mile	Turf	Saratoga	4 July 2025
Sanford Stakes	III	$175,000	2yo	open	6 furlongs	Dirt	Saratoga	4 July 2026
Great Lady M. Stakes	II	$200,500	3&up	f&m	6 1/2 furlongs	Dirt	Los Alamitos	4 July 2026
Kelso Stakes	III	$175,000	4&up	open	1 mile	Turf	Saratoga	5 July 2026
Brooklyn Stakes (Note: In 2025 the Brooklyn Stakes was not held)	II	$200,000	4&up	open	1 3/8 miles	Dirt	Aqueduct	5 July 2024
Victory Ride Stakes (Note: In 2024 the Victory Ride Stakes was moved to Saratoga Racetrack due construction at Belmont Park)	III	$225,000	3yo	fillies	6 1/2 furlongs	Dirt	Saratoga	10 July 2026
Prairie Meadows Cornhusker Handicap	III	$300,000	3&up	open	1 1/8 miles	Dirt	Prairie Meadows	11 July 2026
Indiana Derby	III	$300,000	3yo	open	1 1/16 miles	Dirt	Indianapolis	11 July 2026
Indiana Oaks	III	$200,000	3yo	fillies	1 1/16 miles	Dirt	Indianapolis	11 July 2026
Bowling Green Stakes	II	$250,000	4&up	open	1 3/8 miles	Turf	Saratoga	11 July 2026
Caress Stakes	II	$250,000	4&up	f&m	5 1/2 furlongs	Turf	Saratoga	11 July 2026
Coronation Cup Stakes	III	$175,000	3yo	fillies	5 1/2 furlongs	Turf	Saratoga	18 July 2026
Diana Stakes	I	$500,000	3&up	f&m	1 1/8 miles	Turf	Saratoga	18 July 2026
Haskell Stakes	I	$1,005,000	3yo	open	1 1/8 miles	Dirt	Monmouth Park	18 July 2026
United Nations Stakes	II	$500,000	3&up	open	1 3/8 miles	Turf	Monmouth Park	18 July 2026
Molly Pitcher Stakes	II	$500,000	3&up	f&m	1 1/16 miles	Dirt	Monmouth Park	18 July 2026
Monmouth Cup Stakes	III	$350,000	3&up	open	1 1/8 miles	Dirt	Monmouth Park	18 July 2026
Matchmaker Stakes	III	$300,000	3&up	f&m	1 1/8 miles	Turf	Monmouth Park	18 July 2026
San Clemente Handicap	II	$200,000	3yo	fillies	1 mile	Turf	Del Mar	18 July 2026
San Diego Handicap	II	$300,000	3&up	open	1 1/16 miles	Dirt	Del Mar	18 July 2026
Quick Call Stakes	III	$200,000	3yo	open	5 1/2 furlongs	Turf	Saratoga	19 July 2026
Nassau Stakes	II	CA$200,000	3&up	f&m	1 mile	Turf	Woodbine (CA)	19 July 2026
Connaught Cup Stakes	II	CA$200,000	4&up	open	7 furlongs	Turf	Woodbine (CA)	19 July 2026
Shuvee Stakes	II	$250,000	4&up	f&m	1 1/8 miles	Dirt	Saratoga	24 July 2026
Coaching Club American Oaks	I	$500,000	3yo	fillies	1 1/8 miles	Dirt	Saratoga	25 July 2026
Alfred G. Vanderbilt Handicap	II	$400,000	3&up	open	6 furlongs	Dirt	Saratoga	25 July 2026
Hendrie Stakes	III	CA$175,000	4&up	f&m	6 1/2 furlongs	All weather	Woodbine (CA)	25 July 2026
Trillium Stakes	III	CA$175,000	3&up	f&m	1 1/16 miles	All weather	Woodbine (CA)	25 July 2026
Ontario Colleen Stakes	III	CA$175,000	3yo	fillies	1 mile	Turf	Woodbine (CA)	25 July 2026
Bing Crosby Stakes	I	$400,000	3&up	open	6 furlongs	Dirt	Del Mar	25 July 2026
Monmouth Oaks	III	$150,000	3yo	fillies	1 1/16 miles	Dirt	Monmouth Park	25 July 2026
Honorable Miss Stakes	II	$250,000	3&up	f&m	6 furlongs	Dirt	Saratoga	26 July 2026
Eddie Read Stakes	II	$250,500	3&up	open	1 1/8 miles	Turf	Del Mar	26 July 2026
Amsterdam Stakes	II	$250,000	3yo	open	6 1/2 furlongs	Dirt	Saratoga	31 July 2026
Jim Dandy Stakes	II	$500,000	3yo	open	1 1/8 miles	Dirt	Saratoga	1 August 2026
Lake George Stakes (Note: In 2025 the distance of the Lake George Stakes was increased from 1 mile to 1 1/16 miles)	III	$225,000	3yo	fillies	1 1/16 miles	Turf	Saratoga	1 August 2026
Saratoga Special Stakes	II	$250,000	2yo	open	6 1/2 furlongs	Dirt	Saratoga	1 August 2026
Clement L. Hirsch Stakes	I	$400,000	3&up	f&m	1 1/16 miles	Dirt	Del Mar	1 August 2026
Arlington Million	I	$1,000,000	3&up	open	1 1/4 miles	Turf	Colonial Downs	1 August 2026
Secretariat Stakes	II	$500,000	3yo	open	1 mile	Turf	Colonial Downs	1 August 2026
Beverly D. Stakes	II	$500,000	3&up	f&m	1 3/16 miles	Turf	Colonial Downs	1 August 2026
Seagram Cup Stakes (Note: In 2025 the Seagram Cup Stakes was downgraded to Frade III status)	III	CA$175,000	3&up	open	1 1/16 miles	All weather	Woodbine (CA)	1 August 2026
Glens Falls Stakes	II	$250,000	3&up	f&m	1 1/2 miles	Turf	Saratoga	2 August 2026
Adirondack Stakes	III	$225,000	2yo	fillies	6 1/2 furlongs	Dirt	Saratoga	2 August 2026
National Museum of Racing Hall of Fame Stakes	II	$400,000	3yo	open	1 mile	Turf	Saratoga	7 August 2026
Saratoga Oaks Invitational	II	$500,000	3yo	open	1 3/16 miles	Turf	Saratoga	7 August 2026
Saratoga Derby Invitational	I	$750,000	3yo	open	1 3/16 miles	Turf	Saratoga	8 August 2026
Whitney Stakes	I	$1,000,000	3&up	open	1 1/8 miles	Dirt	Saratoga	8 August 2026
Test Stakes	I	$500,000	3yo	fillies	7 furlongs	Dirt	Saratoga	8 August 2026
Fourstardave Stakes	I	$750,000	3&up	open	1 mile	Turf	Saratoga	8 August 2026
Best Pal Stakes	II	$150,000	2yo	open	6 furlongs	Dirt	Del Mar	8 August 2026
Yellow Ribbon Handicap	II	$200,000	3&up	f&m	1 1/16 miles	Turf	Del Mar	8 August 2026
Troy Stakes	III	$300,000	3&up	open	5 1/2 furlongs	Dirt	Saratoga	9 August 2026
West Virginia Derby	III	$400,000	3yo	open	1 1/8 miles	Dirt	Mountaineer	9 August 2026
Sorrento Stakes	III	$150,500	2yo	fillies	6 furlongs	Dirt	Del Mar	9 August 2026
Philip H. Iselin Stakes	III	$150,000	3&up	open	1 1/16 miles	Dirt	Monmouth Park	15 August 2026
Sword Dancer Stakes	I	$750,000	4&up	open	1 1/2 miles	Turf	Saratoga	15 August 2026
Bold Venture Stakes	III	CA$175,000	3&up	open	6 1/2 furlongs	All weather	Woodbine (CA)	15 August 2026
King Edward Stakes	II	CA$200,000	3&up	open	1 mile	Turf	Woodbine (CA)	15 August 2026
Canadian Stakes	II	CA$200,000	3&up	f&m	1 1/8 miles	Turf	Woodbine (CA)	15 August 2026
Mahony Stakes	III	$225,000	3yo	open	5 1/2 furlongs	Turf	Saratoga	16 August 2026
Rancho Bernardo Handicap	III	$100,000	3&up	f&m	6 1/2 furlongs	Dirt	Del Mar	16 August 2026
Ballston Spa Stakes	II	$300,000	4&up	f&m	1 1/16 miles	Turf	Saratoga	22 August 2026
Alabama Stakes	I	$600,000	3yo	fillies	1 1/4 miles	Dirt	Saratoga	22 August 2026
Del Mar Oaks	I	$300,000	3yo	fillies	1 1/8 miles	Turf	Del Mar	22 August 2026
Pacific Classic Stakes	I	$1,000,000	3&up	open	1 1/4 miles	Dirt	Del Mar	22 August 2026
Del Mar Mile Stakes	II	$300,000	3&up	open	1 mile	Turf	Del Mar	22 August 2026
Green Flash Handicap	II	$200,000	3&up	open	5 furlongs	Turf	Del Mar	22 August 2026
Canadian Derby	III	CA$200,000	3yo	open	1 1/4 miles	Dirt	Century Mile (CA)	22 August 2026
Seaway Stakes	III	CA$175,000	3&up	f&m	7 furlongs	All weather	Woodbine (CA)	22 August 2026
Del Mar Derby	II	$300,000	3yo	open	1 1/8 miles	Turf	Del Mar	23 August 2026
Charles Town Classic	II	$1,000,000	4&up	open	1 1/8 miles	Dirt	Charles Town	28 August 2026
Charles Town Oaks	II	$750,000	3yo	fillies	7 furlongs	Dirt	Charles Town	28 August 2026
Waya Stakes	III	$225,000	3&up	f&m	1 3/8 miles	Turf	Saratoga	28 August 2026
Travers Stakes	I	$1,250,000	3yo	open	1 1/4 miles	Dirt	Saratoga	29 August 2026
Ballerina Stakes	I	$500,000	3&up	f&m	7 furlongs	Dirt	Saratoga	29 August 2026
Forego Stakes	I	$500,000	4&up	open	7 furlongs	Dirt	Saratoga	29 August 2026
Lake Placid Stakes	II	$400,000	3yo	fillies	1 mile	Turf	Saratoga	29 August 2026
Personal Ensign Stakes	I	$500,000	3&up	f&m	1 1/8 miles	Dirt	Saratoga	29 August 2026
H. Allen Jerkens Memorial Stakes	I	$500,000	3yo	open	7 furlongs	Dirt	Saratoga	29 August 2026
Kentucky Downs Ladies Sprint Stakes	I	$1,750,000	3&up	f&m	6 1/2 furlongs	Turf	Kentucky Downs	29 August 2026
Pat O'Brien Stakes	II	$250,500	3&up	open	7 furlongs	Dirt	Del Mar	29 August 2026
Del Mar Handicap	II	$300,000	3&up	open	1 3/8 miles	Turf	Del Mar	29 August 2026
Torrey Pines Stakes	III	$150,000	3yo	fillies	1 mile	Dirt	Del Mar	29 August 2026
Singspiel Stakes	III	CA$175,000	3&up	open	1 3/8 miles	Turf	Woodbine (CA)	5 September 2026
With Anticipation Stakes	III	$225,000	2yo	open	1 1/16 miles	Turf	Saratoga	5 September 2026
Spinaway Stakes	I	$300,000	2yo	fillies	7 furlongs	Dirt	Saratoga	5 September 2026
Music City Stakes	III	$1,500,000	3yo	fillies	6 1/2 furlongs	Turf	Kentucky Downs	5 September 2026
Kentucky Downs Ladies Turf Stakes	II	$1,500,000	3&up	f&m	1 mile	Turf	Kentucky Downs	5 September 2026
Kentucky Downs Turf Sprint Stakes	II	$1,750,000	3&up	open	6 furlongs	Turf	Kentucky Downs	5 September 2026
Nashville Derby	II	$3,000,000	3yo	open	1 5/16 miles	Turf	Kentucky Downs	5 September 2026
Kentucky Turf Cup	II	$2,000,000	3&up	open	1 1/2 miles	Turf	Kentucky Downs	5 September 2026
Del Mar Debutante Stakes	I	$300,000	2yo	fillies	7 furlongs	Dirt	Del Mar	5 September 2026
Del Mar Juvenile Turf Stakes	III	$100,000	2yo	open	1 mile	Turf	Del Mar	5 September 2026
Hopeful Stakes	I	$300,000	2yo	open	7 furlongs	Dirt	Saratoga	6 September 2026
Prioress Stakes	III	$225,000	3yo	fillies	6 furlongs	Dirt	Saratoga	6 September 2026
Del Mar Futurity	I	$300,000	2yo	open	7 furlongs	Dirt	Del Mar	6 September 2026
Aristocrat Ladies Marathon Stakes	III	$1,500,000	3&up	f&m	1 5/16 miles	Turf	Kentucky Downs	6 September 2026
Franklin-Simpson Stakes	II	$1,500,000	3yo	open	6 1/2 furlongs	Turf	Kentucky Downs	7 September 2026
Mint Millions Stakes	III	$2,000,000	3&up	open	1 mile	Turf	Kentucky Downs	7 September 2026
John C. Mabee Stakes	II	$250,000	3&up	f&m	1 1/8 miles	Turf	Del Mar	7 September 2026
Old Dominion Derby (Note: In 2025 Colonial Downs created a new event in the spring that was named the Virginia Derby. The original event with that name was renamed to the Old Dominion Derby)	III	$500,000	3yo	open	1 1/8 miles	Turf	Colonial Downs	7 September 2026
Dueling Grounds Oaks	III	$2,000,000	3yo	fillies	1 5/16 miles	Turf	Kentucky Downs	9 September 2026
E.P. Taylor Stakes	I	CA$750,000	3&up	f&m	1 1/4 miles	Turf	Woodbine (CA)	12 September 2026
Woodbine Mile	I	CA$1,000,000	3&up	open	1 mile	Turf	Woodbine (CA)	12 September 2026
Ontario Matron Stakes	III	CA$175,000	3&up	f&m	1 1/16 miles	All weather	Woodbine (CA)	12 September 2026
Summer Stakes	I	CA$500,000	2yo	open	1 mile	Turf	Woodbine (CA)	12 September 2026
Vigil Stakes	III	CA$175,000	3&up	open	6 furlongs	All weather	Woodbine (CA)	12 September 2026
Natalma Stakes	I	CA$500,000	2yo	fillies	1 mile	Turf	Woodbine (CA)	12 September 2026
Princess Rooney Stakes	III	$225,000	3&up	f&m	7 furlongs	Dirt	Gulfstream Park	12 September 2026
Iroquois Stakes	III	$300,000	2yo	open	1 mile	Dirt	Churchill Downs	12 September 2026
Locust Grove Stakes	II	$400,000	3&up	f&m	1 1/16 miles	Dirt	Churchill Downs	12 September 2022
Pocahontas Stakes	III	$300,000	2yo	fillies	1 mile	Dirt	Churchill Downs	12 September 2026
Presque Isle Downs Masters Stakes	II	$300,000	3&up	f&m	6 1/2 furlongs	All weather	Presque Isle Downs	18 September 2026
Jockey Club Gold Cup	I	$1,000,000	3&up	open	1 1/4 miles	Dirt	Belmont	18 September 2026
Durham Cup Stakes	III	CA$175,000	3&up	open	1 1/16 miles	All weather	Woodbine (CA)	19 September 2026
Pennsylvania Derby	I	$1,000,000	3yo	open	1 1/8 miles	Dirt	Parx Racing	19 September 2026
Cotillion Stakes	I	$1,000,000	3yo	fillies	1 1/16 miles	Dirt	Parx Racing	19 September 2026
Gallant Bob Stakes	II	$400,000	3yo	open	6 furlongs	Dirt	Parx Racing	19 September 2026
Dogwood Stakes	III	$300,000	3yo	fillies	7 furlongs	Dirt	Churchill Downs	19 September 2026
Beldame Stakes	II	$250,000	3&up	f&m	1 1/8 miles	Dirt	Belmont	25 September 2026
John C. Harris Stakes	III	$100,000	3yo	fillies	abt. 6 1/2 furlongs	Turf	Santa Anita Park	26 September 2026
Goodwood Stakes (Note: In 2025 the event was renamed from the California Crown Stakes to the Goodwood Stakes)	I	$300,000	3&up	open	1 1/8 miles	Dirt	Santa Anita Park	26 September 2026
John Henry Turf Championship Stakes	II	$200,000	3&up	open	1 1/4 miles	Turf	Santa Anita Park	26 September 2026
Eddie D Stakes	II	$200,000	3&up	open	abt. 6 1/2 furlongs	Turf	Santa Anita Park	26 September 2026
City of Hope Mile Stakes	II	$200,000	3&up	open	1 mile	Turf	Santa Anita Park	26 September 2026
Lukas Classic Stakes	II	$500,000	3&up	open	1 1/8 miles	Dirt	Churchill Downs	26 September 2026
Ack Ack Stakes	III	$400,000	3&up	open	1 mile	Dirt	Churchill Downs	26 September 2026
Zenyatta Stakes	II	$200,000	3&up	f&m	1 1/16 miles	Dirt	Santa Anita Park	27 September 2026
Santa Anita Sprint Championship	II	$200,000	3&up	open	6 furlongs	Dirt	Santa Anita Park	27 September 2026
Oklahoma Derby	III	$400,000	3yo	open	1 1/8 miles	Dirt	Remington Park	27 September 2026
Flower Bowl Stakes	II	$500,000	3&up	f&m	1 3/8 miles	Turf	Belmont	1 October 2026
Joe Hirsch Turf Classic	I	$500,000	3&up	open	1 1/2 miles	Turf	Belmont	1 October 2026
Vosburgh Stakes	III	$250,000	3&up	open	7 furlongs	Dirt	Belmont	1 October 2026
Belmont Turf Sprint Stakes	III	$200,000	3&up	open	6 furlongs	Turf	Belmont	1 October 2026
Winter Memories Stakes	III	$200,000	3yo	fillies	1 mile	Turf	Belmont	1 October 2026
Gallant Bloom Stakes	II	$250,000	3&up	f&m	6 1/2 furlongs	Dirt	Belmont	1 October 2026
Alcibiades Stakes	I	$650,000	2yo	fillies	1 1/16 miles	Dirt	Keeneland	2 October 2022
Jessamine Stakes	II	$400,000	2yo	fillies	1 1/16 miles	Turf	Keeneland	2 October 2026
Phoenix Stakes	II	$400,000	3&up	open	6 furlongs	Dirt	Keeneland	2 October 2026
Canadian International Stakes (Note: In 2025 the distance of the Canadian International Stakes was increased from 1 1/4 miles to 1 1/2 miles)	I	CA$750,000	3&up	open	1 1/2 miles	Turf	Woodbine (CA)	3 October 2026
Nearctic Stakes	II	CA$250,000	3&up	open	5 furlongs	Turf	Woodbine (CA)	3 October 2026
Dance Smartly Stakes	II	CA$200,000	3&up	f&m	1 1/16 miles	Turf	Woodbine (CA)	3 October 2026
Rodeo Drive Stakes	II	$200,000	3&up	f&m	1 1/4 miles	Turf	Santa Anita Park	3 October 2026
American Pharoah Stakes	I	$300,000	2yo	open	1 1/16 miles	Dirt	Santa Anita Park	3 October 2026
Oak Leaf Stakes	II	$200,000	2yo	fillies	1 1/16 miles	Dirt	Santa Anita Park	3 October 2026
Chillingworth Stakes	III	$100,000	3&up	f&m	6 1/2 furlongs	Dirt	Santa Anita Park	3 October 2026
Coolmore Turf Mile Stakes	I	$1,250,000	3&up	open	1 mile	Turf	Keeneland	3 October 2026
Breeders' Futurity Stakes	I	$650,000	2yo	open	1 1/16 miles	Dirt	Keeneland	3 October 2026
First Lady Stakes	I	$800,000	3&up	f&m	1 mile	Turf	Keeneland	3 October 2026
Thoroughbred Club of America Stakes	II	$400,000	3&up	f&m	6 furlongs	Dirt	Keeneland	3 October 2026
Woodford Stakes	II	$400,000	3&up	open	5 1/2 furlongs	Turf	Keeneland	3 October 2026
Delaware Handicap	III	$600,000	3&up	f&m	1 1/8 miles (Note: In 2025 the distance of the Delaware Handicap was decreased from 1 3/16 miles to 1 1/8 miles)	Dirt	Delaware Park	3 October 2026
Pilgrim Stakes	II	$250,000	2yo	open	1 1/16 miles	Turf	Belmont	3 October 2026
Futurity Stakes	III	$200,000	2yo	open	6 furlongs	Turf	Belmont	3 October 2026
Frizette Stakes	I	$500,000	2yo	fillies	1 mile	Dirt	Belmont	3 October 2026
Champagne Stakes	I	$500,000	2yo	open	1 mile	Dirt	Belmont	3 October 2026
Miss Grillo Stakes	II	$250,000	2yo	fillies	1 1/16 miles	Turf	Belmont	3 October 2026
Matron Stakes	III	$200,000	2yo	fillies	6 furlongs	Turf	Belmont	3 October 2026
Surfer Girl Stakes	III	$100,000	2yo	fillies	1 mile	Turf	Santa Anita Park	4 October 2026
Zuma Beach Stakes	III	$100,000	2yo	open	1 mile	Turf	Santa Anita Park	4 October 2026
Bourbon Stakes	II	$400,000	2yo	open	1 1/16 miles	Turf	Keeneland	4 October 2026
Spinster Stakes	I	$650,000	3&up	f&m	1 1/8 miles	Dirt	Keeneland	4 October 2026
Indian Summer Stakes	III	$350,000	2yo	open	5 1/2 furlongs	Turf	Keeneland	4 October 2026
Sycamore Stakes	II	$400,000	3&up	open	1 1/2 miles	Turf	Keeneland	9 October 2026
Queen Elizabeth II Challenge Cup Stakes	I	$750,000	3yo	fillies	1 1/8 miles	Turf	Keeneland	10 October 2026
Hill Prince Stakes	III	$200,000	3yo	open	1 3/16 miles	Turf	Belmont	10 October 2026
Franklin Stakes	II	$400,000	3&up	f&m	5 1/2 furlongs	Turf	Keeneland	11 October 2026
Ontario Fashion Stakes	III	CA$175,000	3&up	f&m	6 furlongs	All weather	Woodbine (CA)	17 October 2026
Ontario Derby	III	CA$175,000	3yo	open	1 1/8 miles	All weather	Woodbine (CA)	17 October 2026
Raven Run Stakes	II	$400,000	3yo	fillies	7 furlongs	Dirt	Keeneland	17 October 2026
Perryville Stakes	III	$350,000	3yo	open	7 furlongs	Dirt	Keeneland	17 October 2026
Dowager Stakes	III	$350,000	3&up	f&m	1 1/2 miles	Turf	Keeneland	18 October 2026
Valley View Stakes	II	$400,000	3yo	fillies	1 1/16 miles	Turf	Keeneland	23 October 2026
Sands Point Stakes	III	$200,000	3yo	fillies	1 1/8 miles	Turf	Belmont	23 October 2026
Bryan Station Stakes	II	$400,000	3&up	open	1 mile	Turf	Keeneland	24 October 2026
Fayette Stakes	III	$350,000	3&up	open	1 1/8 miles	Dirt	Keeneland	24 October 2026
Tokyo City Cup Stakes	III	$85,000	3&up	open	1 mile	Dirt	Santa Anita Park	24 October 2026
Autumn Miss Stakes	III	$100,000	3yo	fillies	1 mile	Turf	Santa Anita Park	25 October 2026
Street Sense Stakes	III	$200,000	2yo	open	1 mile	Dirt	Churchill Downs	25 October 2026
Glen Cove Stakes	III	$200,000	3yo	fillies	6 furlongs	Turf	Belmont	25 October 2026
Breeders' Cup Juvenile Turf	I	$1,000,000	2yo	c&g	1 mile	Turf	Keeneland	30 October 2026
Breeders' Cup Juvenile	I	$2,000,000	2yo	c&g	1 1/16 miles	Dirt	Keeneland	30 October 2026
Breeders' Cup Juvenile Fillies Turf	I	$1,000,000	2yo	fillies	1 mile	Turf	Keeneland	30 October 2026
Breeders' Cup Juvenile Fillies	I	$2,000,000	2yo	fillies	1 1/16 miles	Dirt	Keeneland	30 October 2026
Breeders' Cup Juvenile Turf Sprint	I	$1,000,000	2yo	open	5 1/2 furlongs	Turf	Keeneland	30 October 2026
Breeders' Cup Classic	I	$7,000,000	3&up	open	1 1/4 miles	Dirt	Keeneland	31 October 2026
Breeders' Cup Filly & Mare Turf	I	$2,000,000	3&up	f&m	1 3/8 miles	Turf	Keeneland	31 October 2026
Breeders' Cup Turf	I	$5,000,000	3&up	open	1 1/2 miles	Turf	Keeneland	31 October 2026
Breeders' Cup Turf Sprint	I	$1,000,000	3&up	open	5 furlongs	Turf	Keeneland	31 October 2026
Breeders' Cup Sprint	I	$2,000,000	3&up	open	6 furlongs	Dirt	Keeneland	31 October 2026
Breeders' Cup Filly & Mare Sprint	I	$1,000,000	3&up	f&m	7 furlongs	Dirt	Keeneland	31 October 2026
Breeders' Cup Dirt Mile	I	$1,000,000	3&up	open	1 mile	Dirt	Keeneland	31 October 2026
Breeders' Cup Mile	I	$2,000,000	3&up	open	1 mile	Turf	Keeneland	31 October 2026
Breeders' Cup Distaff	I	$2,000,000	3&up	f&m	1 1/8 miles	Dirt	Keeneland	31 October 2026
Goldikova Stakes	III	$100,000	3&up	f&m	1 mile	Turf	Santa Anita	31 October 2026
Grey Stakes	III	CA$175,000	2yo	open	1 1/16 miles	All weather	Woodbine (CA)	1 November 2026
Mazarine Stakes	III	CA$175,000	2yo	fillies	1 1/16 miles	All weather	Woodbine (CA)	1 November 2026
Twilight Derby	II	$200,000	3yo	open	1 1/8 miles	Turf	Santa Anita Park	1 November 2026
Forty Niner Stakes	III	$200,000	3&up	open	1 mile	Dirt	Belmont	1 November 2026
Bold Ruler Stakes	III	$200,000	3&up	open	6 furlongs	Dirt	Belmont	1 November 2026
Bessarabian Stakes	III	CA$175,000	3&up	f&m	7 furlongs	All weather	Woodbine (CA)	7 November 2026
Autumn Stakes	III	CA$175,000	3&up	open	1 1/8 miles	All weather	Woodbine (CA)	7 November 2026
Maple Leaf Stakes	III	CA$175,000	3&up	f&m	1 1/4 miles	All weather	Woodbine (CA)	7 November 2026
River City Handicap	III	$300,000	3&up	open	1 1/8 miles	Turf	Churchill Downs	7 November 2026
Mother Goose Stakes	II	$300,000	3yo	fillies	1 1/8 miles	Dirt	Belmont	7 November 2026
Kennedy Road Stakes	II	CA$200,000	3&up	open	6 furlongs	All weather	Woodbine (CA)	14 November 2026
Cougar II Stakes (Note: In 2025 the Cougar II Stakes was not held)	III	$100,000	3&up	open	1 1/2 miles	Dirt	Del Mar	25 July 2024
British Columbia Derby	III	CA$125,000	3yo	open	1 1/8 miles	Dirt	Hastings (CA)	13 September 2025
Woodward Stakes	II	$261,000	3&up	open	1 1/8 miles	Dirt	Aqueduct	27 September 2025
Jockey Club Derby Invitational Stakes	III	$500,000	3yo	open	1 1/4 miles	Dirt	Aqueduct	4 October 2025
BC Premier's Handicap	III	CA$94,000	3&up	open	1 3/8 miles	Dirt	Hastings (CA)	5 October 2024
Red Smith Stakes	III	$242,500	3&up	open	1 3/8 miles	Turf	Aqueduct	2 November 2025
Long Island Stakes	III	$250,000	3&up	f&m	1 3/8 miles	Turf	Aqueduct	8 November 2025
Jockey Club Oaks Invitational Stakes	III	$350,000	3yo	fillies	1 3/8 miles	Turf	Aqueduct	15 November 2025
Chilukki Stakes	III	$300,000	3&up	f&m	1 mile	Dirt	Churchill Downs	15 November 2025
Native Diver Stakes	III	$98,000	3&up	open	1 1/8 miles	Dirt	Del Mar	22 November 2025
Commonwealth Turf Stakes	III	$299,800	3&up	open	1 1/16 miles	Turf	Churchill Downs	22 November 2025
Pebbles Stakes (Note: The Pebbles Stakes was originally scheduled to be held 16 November 2025 but the card was canceled due to high winds and the event was rescheduled for 23 November 2025. The distance of the event was increased from one mile to one-and-one sixteenth miles.)	III	$175,000	3yo	fillies	1 1/16 miles	Turf	Aqueduct	23 November 2025
Falls City Stakes	III	$385,000	3&up	f&m	1 1/8 miles	Dirt	Churchill Downs	27 November 2025
Clark Stakes	II	$595,000	3&up	open	1 1/8 miles	Dirt	Churchill Downs	27 November 2025
Mrs. Revere Stakes	II	$269,800	3yo	fillies	1 1/16 miles	Turf	Churchill Downs	28 November 2025
Hollywood Turf Cup Stakes	II	$202,000	3&up	open	1 1/2 miles	Turf	Del Mar	28 November 2025
Kentucky Jockey Club Stakes	II	$400,000	2yo	open	1 1/16 miles	Dirt	Churchill Downs	29 November 2025
Golden Rod Stakes	II	$397,375	2yo	fillies	1 1/16 miles	Dirt	Churchill Downs	29 November 2025
Seabiscuit Handicap	II	$201,500	3&up	open	1 1/16 miles	Turf	Del Mar	29 November 2025
Jimmy Durante Stakes	III	$103,000	2yo	fillies	1 mile	Turf	Del Mar	29 November 2025
Hollywood Derby	I	$301,500	3yo	open	1 1/8 miles	Turf	Del Mar	29 November 2025
Matriarch Stakes	I	$302,000	3&up	f&m	1 mile	Turf	Del Mar	30 November 2025
Cecil B. DeMille Stakes	III	$101,000	2yo	open	1 mile	Turf	Del Mar	30 November 2025
Bayakoa Stakes (Los Alamitos)	III	$101,500	3&up	f&m	1 mile	Dirt	Del Mar	30 November 2025
Cigar Mile Handicap	II	$500,000	3&up	open	1 mile	Dirt	Aqueduct	6 December 2025
Demoiselle Stakes	II	$250,000	2yo	fillies	1 1/8 miles	Dirt	Aqueduct	6 December 2025
Elite Power Stakes (Note: In 2025 the Runhappy Stakes was moved to the fall and renamed to the Elite Power Stakes)	III	$169,750	4&up	open	6 furlongs	Dirt	Aqueduct	6 December 2025
Remsen Stakes	II	$250,000	2yo	open	1 1/8 miles	Dirt	Aqueduct	6 December 2025
Valedictory Stakes	III	CA$141,130	3&up	open	1 1/2 miles	All weather	Woodbine (CA)	7 December 2024
Starlet Stakes	II	$201,000	2yo	fillies	1 1/16 miles	Dirt	Los Alamitos	6 December 2025
Comely Stakes	III	$194,000	3yo	fillies	1 1/8 miles	Dirt	Aqueduct	7 December 2025
Los Alamitos Futurity	III	$200,000	2yo	open	1 1/16 miles	Dirt	Los Alamitos	12 December 2025
Harlan's Holiday Stakes	III	$150,000	3&up	open	1 1/16 miles	Dirt	Gulfstream Park	20 December 2025
Fort Lauderdale Stakes	III	$200,000	3&up	open	1 1/8 miles	Turf	Gulfstream Park	20 December 2025
Mr. Prospector Stakes	III	$150,000	3&up	open	7 furlongs	Dirt	Gulfstream Park	27 December 2025
San Gabriel Stakes	III	$103,000	3&up	open	1 1/8 miles	Dirt	Santa Anita Park	28 December 2025
American Oaks	I	$303,000	3yo	fillies	1 1/4 miles	Dirt	Santa Anita Park	28 December 2025
La Brea Stakes	I	$302,500	3yo	fillies	7 furlongs	Dirt	Santa Anita Park	28 December 2025
Malibu Stakes	I	$301,000	3yo	open	7 furlongs	Dirt	Santa Anita Park	28 December 2025
Laffit Pincay Jr. Stakes	II	$200,500	3&up	open	1 1/16 miles	Dirt	Santa Anita Park	28 December 2025
Mathis Mile Stakes	II	$200,500	3yo	open	1 mile	Dirt	Santa Anita Park	28 December 2025
Joe Hernandez Stakes	III	$202,500	3&up	open	abt. 6 1/2 furlongs	Turf	Santa Anita Park	29 December 2025

== See also ==
- Group races, the European equivalent
- Graded stakes race, the North American equivalent
- List of British flat horse races
- List of Australian Group races
- List of South American Group races
- List of Japanese flat horse races
