= Coronation Cup Stakes =

Flat thoroughbred horse race in America

- Class: Grade III
- Location: Saratoga Race Course; Saratoga Springs, New York, United States
- Inaugurated: 2012
- Race type: Thoroughbred - Flat racing
- Website: NYRA

Race information
- Distance: 5 1/2 furlongs
- Surface: Turf
- Track: Left-handed
- Qualification: Three-year-old fillies
- Weight: 124 lbs with allowances
- Purse: $175,000 (2025)

The Coronation Cup Stakes is a Grade III American Thoroughbred horse race for three-year-old fillies over a distance of 5 1/2 furlongs on the turf course scheduled annually in July at Saratoga Race Course in Saratoga Springs, New York. The event currently carries a purse of $175,000.

== History ==
The event was name after the Rokeby Stable Virginia-bred color-bearer Coronation Cup who won the 1994 Nijana Stakes at Saratoga.

The event was inaugurated on 13 August 2012 and was won by the Kentucky-bred filly Sensible Lady, sired by the 2007 Kentucky Derby winner Street Sense by 2 1/4 lengths in a time of 1:03.14.

In 2015 Lady Shipman set a stakes record when winning by 3 1/4 lengths in a time of 1:00.85.

Due to unseasonable rain, the event in 2016 was moved off the turf and run on a sloppy dirt track with only four runners and was reclassified as a Listed event after examination by the Graded Stakes Committee. However, in 2021 and 2023 the event lost its Listed status and was reclassified as a non-Listed Black Type event after the events were moved to the dirt track.

In 2025 the event was upgraded to Grade III by the Thoroughbred Owners and Breeders Association.

== Records ==
Speed record:

- 5 1/2 furlongs (turf): 1:00.85 - Lady Shipman (2015)
- 5 1/2 furlongs (dirt): 1:03.80 - Unified Alliance (2023)

Margins:

- 3 1/4 lengths - Lady Shipman (2015)

Most wins by a jockey:

- 3- Luis Saez (2018, 2024, 2025)

Most wins by a trainer:

- 2 - Brad H. Cox (2019, 2021)
- 2 - John P. Terranova II (2018, 2025)

Most wins by an owner:

- 2 - Klein Racing (2019, 2021)

== Winners ==
Year	Winner	Jockey	Trainer	Owner	Distance	Time	Purse	Grade	Ref
2026	Cy Fair	John R. Velazquez	George Weaver	Medallion Racing, Swinbank Stables, Joey Platts and Mark Stanton	5 1/2 furlongs	1:01.83	$225,000	III	
2025	Italian Soiree	Luis Saez	John P. Terranova II	Hit The Bid Racing Stable, Morplay Racing & Randell Hartley	5 1/2 furlongs	1:02.21	$175,000	III	
2024	Twirling Queen	Luis Saez	Jose F. D'Angelo	GU Racing Stable	5 1/2 furlongs	1:01.93	$150,000	Listed	
2023	Unified Alliance	Javier Castellano	Thomas Morley	Reagan Jack Racing	5 1/2 furlongs	1:03.80	$139,500		Off turf
2022	Empress Tigress	John R. Velazquez	Jonathan Thomas	Augustin Stables	5 1/2 furlongs	1:01.70	$150,000	Listed	
2021	Goin' Good	Tyler Gaffalione	Brad H. Cox	Klein Racing	5 1/2 furlongs	1:05.26	$111,600		Off turf
2020	She's My Type (FR)	Joel Rosario	Christophe Clement	Ghislaine Head	5 1/2 furlongs	1:01.67	$100,000	Listed	
2019	Break Even	Shaun Bridgmohan	Brad H. Cox	Klein Racing	5 1/2 furlongs	1:01.59	$100,000	Listed	
2018	Broadway Run	Luis Saez	John P. Terranova II	Curragh Stables	5 1/2 furlongs	1:03.67	$100,000	Listed	
2017	Morticia	Jose Lezcano	George R. Arnold II	G. Watts Humphrey Jr.	5 1/2 furlongs	1:01.27	$100,000	Listed	
2016	Lost Raven	Jose Ortiz	Todd A. Pletcher	Repole Stable	5 1/2 furlongs	1:04.42	$95,000	Listed	Off turf
2015	Lady Shipman	Eduardo Nunez	Kathleen O'Connell	Ranlo Investments	5 1/2 furlongs	1:00.85	$100,000		
2014	Stars Above Me (GB)	Irad Ortiz Jr.	H. Graham Motion	Elite Racing Club	5 1/2 furlongs	1:02.11	$100,000		
2013	Jewel of a Cat	Christopher DeCarlo	Benjamin W. Perkins Jr.	J & J Stables & GSP Racing Stable	5 1/2 furlongs	1:01.81	$98,000		
2012	Sensible Lady	Xavier Perez	Timothy Salzman	Matt Lyons	5 1/2 furlongs	1:03.14	$100,000	Listed	

Legend:
Dirt Turf

== See also ==
- List of American and Canadian Graded races
