= Limestone Stakes =

- Class: Grade III
- Location: Keeneland Racecourse; Lexington, Kentucky; United States
- Inaugurated: 2019 (as Limestone Turf Sprint Stakes)
- Race type: Thoroughbred – Flat racing
- Sponsor: FanDuel (since 2022)
- Website: Keeneland

Race information
- Distance: 5 1/2 furlongs
- Surface: Turf
- Track: Left-handed
- Qualification: Three-year-old fillies
- Weight: 123 lbs with allowances
- Purse: US$350,000 (2026)

The Limestone Stakes is a Grade III American Thoroughbred horse race for three-year-old fillies over a distance of 5 1/2 furlongs on the turf held annually in early April at Keeneland Race Course, Lexington, Kentucky during the spring meeting. The event currently offers a purse of $350,000.

== History ==
The event is named after the Lexington Limestone, a prominent geologic formation that heavily influenced both the surface topography and economy of the region.

In the inaugural running of the event was as the Limestone Turf Sprint Stakes on April 12, 2019, and the winner was the Irish-bred three-year-old filly Ginger Nut who ridden by US Hall of Fame jockey Joel Rosario and won by one and a quarters lengths in a time of 1:03.53.

In 2020 due to the COVID-19 pandemic in the United States, Keeneland did not schedule the event in their updated and shortened summer meeting.

In 2024 the event was moved off the turf and held on a sloppy track. The event was won by Hot Beach by four lengths. The event lost its Listed status for the running.

In 2026 the event was upgraded by the Thoroughbred Owners and Breeders Association to a Grade III.

== Records ==
Speed record

- 5 1/2 furlongs: 1:01:99 – Slay the Day (2026)

Margins

- 4 lengths – Hot Beach (2024)

Most wins by a jockey

- 2 – Joel Rosario (2019, 2023)
- 2 – John R. Velazquez (2022, 2026)

Most wins by a trainer

- 3 – Brian A. Lynch (2021, 2024, 2026)

Most wins by an owner

- 2 – Stonestreet Stables (2022, 2023)

== Winners ==
Year	Winner	Jockey	Trainer	Owner	Distance	Time	Purse	Grade	Ref
Limestone Stakes
2026	Slay the Day	John R. Velazquez	Brian A. Lynch	Flying Dutchmen Breeding & Racing	5 1/2 furlongs	1:01.99	$328,150	III	
2025	Shisospicy	Irad Ortiz Jr.	Jose F. D'Angelo	Morplay Racing	5 1/2 furlongs	1:03.94	$293,850	Listed	
2024	Hot Beach	José Ortiz	Brian A. Lynch	Boardshorts Stable	5 1/2 furlongs	1:05.70	$244,563		Off turf
2023	Love Reigns (IRE)	Joel Rosario	Wesley A. Ward	Stonestreet Stables	5 1/2 furlongs	1:02.45	$208,188	Listed	
2022	Ruthin (GB)	John R. Velazquez	Wesley A. Ward	Stonestreet Stables	5 1/2 furlongs	1:03.33	$155,100	Listed	
Limestone Turf Sprint Stakes
2021	Tobys Heart	Javier Castellano	Brian A. Lynch	Gary Barber, Terry Hamilton & Brian A. Lynch	5 1/2 furlongs	1:02.29	$100,000		
2020	Race not held								
2019	Ginger Nut (IRE)	Joel Rosario	John W. Sadler	Hronis Racing	5 1/2 furlongs	1:03.53	$100,000		

Legend:
Dirt Turf

== See also ==
- List of American and Canadian Graded races

== External sites ==
- 2026 Keeneland Media Guide (page 113)
