= Surfer Girl Stakes =

Annual US horse race

- Class: Grade III
- Location: Santa Anita Park; Arcadia, California, United States
- Inaugurated: 2012
- Race type: Thoroughbred – Flat racing
- Website: Santa Anita

Race information
- Distance: 1 mile
- Surface: Turf
- Track: left-handed
- Qualification: Two-year-old fillies
- Weight: 122 lbs. with allowances
- Purse: $100,000 (since 2024)

The Surfer Girl Stakes is a Grade III American Thoroughbred horse race for two-year-old fillies over a distance of one mile on the turf track scheduled annually in October at Santa Anita Park in Arcadia, California. The event currently carries a purse of $100,000.

== History ==
The inaugural running of the event was inaugurated on October 8, 2012, and was won by the Flashy Ways who was trained by Richard Baltas and ridden by the Joseph Talamo by 2 3/4 lengths in a time of 1:34.45. The event was included with a similar event for two-year-old colts and geldings known as the Zuma Beach Stakes which has been run on the same racecard since inception. The name of the event is similar as it refers to sex of the horse with reference to female surfers on the Southern California beaches. Also the name of the event was a 1963 song, Surfer Girl made famous by the Californian based band Beach Boys.

The event is a preparatory race for the Breeders' Cup Juvenile Fillies Turf. Although no horse has won both events, 2017 winner of the Surfer Girl Stakes, French-bred Fatale Bere finished fifth in the Breeders' Cup Juvenile Fillies Turf to Rushing Fall which was held at nearby Del Mar Racetrack. Fatale Bere would go on to win the Grade 1 Del Mar Oaks as a three-year-old in 2018.

In 2022 the event was upgraded by the Thoroughbred Owners and Breeders Association to a Grade III.

== Records ==
Speed record:

- 1 mile: 1:34.27 – Cairo Memories (2021)

Margins:

- 4 1/2 lengths – Thought Process (2024)

Most wins by an owner:

- 2 – Little Red Feather Racing (2022, 2024)

Most wins by a jockey:

- 3 – Kent J. Desormeaux (2016, 2017, 2021)

Most wins by a trainer:

- 2 – Doug F. O'Neill (2013, 2018)
- 2 – Philip D'Amato (2022, 2024)

== Winners ==
Year	Winner	Jockey	Trainer	Owner	Distance	Time	Purse	Grade	Ref
2026	Vanta	Umberto Rispoli	Jeff Mullins	Dutch Girl Holdings and Irvine Ventures	1 mile	1:35.17	$100,000	III	
2025	Brave Deb	Mirco Demuro	Richard E. Mandella	Spendthrift Farm	1 mile	1:35.40	$101,500	III	
2024	Thought Process	Hector Berrios	Philip D'Amato	Little Red Feather Racing, Madaket Stables & Estate of Brereton C. Jones	1 mile	1:34.34	$100,500	III	
2023	Dreamfyre	Hector Berrios	O. J. Jauregui	Danny A. Eplin	1 mile	1:37.11	$202,000	III	
2022	Comanche Country (IRE)	Umberto Rispoli	Philip D'Amato	Little Red Feather Racing, Sterling Stables & Marsha Naify	1 mile	1:35.20	$201,500	III	
2021	Cairo Memories	Kent J. Desormeaux	Robert B. Hess, Jr.	David A. Bernsen & Schroeder Farms	1 mile	1:34.27	$203,000	Listed	
2020	Madone	Flavien Prat	Simon Callaghan	Kaleem Shah	1 mile	1:34.83	$102,000	Listed	
2019	Warren's Showtime	Jorge Velez	Craig A. Lewis	Benjamin C. & Sally Warren	1 mile	1:35.06	$100,351	Listed	
2018	Lakerball	Mario Gutierrez	Doug F. O'Neill	Pappas Horse Racing Corp., Purple Rein Racing & Tom R. Roberts	1 mile	1:35.23	$100,345	Listed	
2017	Fatale Bere (FR)	Kent J. Desormeaux	Leonard Powell	Benowitz Family Trust, Mark Mathiesen & Mathilde Powell	1 mile	1:34.73	$102,415	Listed	
2016	Miss Southern Miss	Kent J. Desormeaux	J. Keith Desormeaux	Peter L. Cantrell	1 mile	1:35.08	$102,070	Listed	
2015	Stays in Vegas	Alex O. Solis	Jerry Hollendorfer	Jungle Racing, KMN Racing & LNJ Foxwoods	1 mile	1:35.23	$101,500	Listed	
2014	Her Emmynency	Joseph Talamo	Michael Stidham	Ike & Dawn Thrash	1 mile	1:34.77	$101,750	Listed	
2013	Clenor (IRE)	Rafael Bejarano	Doug F. O'Neill	Great Friends Stable, Robert Cseplo & Steven Keh	1 mile	1:34.38	$101,250		
2012	Flashy Ways	Joseph Talamo	Richard Baltas	Riley Racing Stables	1 mile	1:34.45	$100,000	Listed	

Legend:
Turf

== See also ==
List of American and Canadian Graded races
