= Bryan Station Stakes =

- Class: Grade II
- Location: Keeneland; Lexington, Kentucky, United States
- Inaugurated: 1993
- Race type: Thoroughbred – Flat racing
- Website: Keeneland

Race information
- Distance: 1 mile
- Surface: Turf
- Track: Left-handed
- Qualification: Three-year-olds
- Weight: 122 lbs with allowances
- Purse: $600,000 (2024)

The Bryan Station Stakes is a Grade II American Thoroughbred horse race for three-year-olds over a distance of one mile on the turf held annually in October at Keeneland Race Course, Lexington, Kentucky during the autumn meeting. It currently offers a purse of $600,000.

== History ==
The Bryan Station Stakes is named after an early fortified settlement known as Bryan Station in Lexington, Kentucky. It was located on present-day Bryan Station Road, about three miles northeast of New Circle Road, on the southern bank of Elkhorn Creek near Briar Hill Road.

The event was inaugurated on 15 April 1993 as a race for fillies and mares that were four-years-old or older over a distance of one and one-sixteenth miles on the dirt track and was won by Peter S. Willmott's Gray Cashmere starting at 6/1 in a time of 1:44.44 flat by 1/2 a length. The following year the event was scheduled in the autumn October meeting and held on the turf with conditions of event modified to fillies and mares that were three-years-old or older.

The event was shortened to a mile in 1995 and the winner Very Special Lite set a new track record of 1:33 3/5.

In 2002 the conditions of entry into the event were changed to only allow three-year-olds and the event was renamed to the Storm Cat Stakes. Storm Cat was the leading sire in North America in 1999 and 2000.

In 2005 Keeneland reverted the name of event back to the Bryan Station Stakes. The event's classification was upgraded to Grade III status in 2008.

After 2010 the event was only scheduled in 2015 and it lost its classification status.

The event has been regularly scheduled since 2020 and in 2022 the event regained its Grade III status. In 2026 the event was upgraded to Grade II.

== Records ==
Speed record

- 1 mile: 1:33:60 – Very Special Lite (1995)

Margins

- 6 lengths – Mingling Glances (1998)

Most wins

- 2 – Mingling Glances (1998, 1999)

Most wins by a jockey

- 3 – Javier Castellano (2009, 2015, 2020)

Most wins by a trainer

- 3 – Burk Kessinger Jr. (1998, 1999 twice)

Most wins by an owner

- 2 – Bruce Barton & Alvin D. Haynes (1998, 1999)

== Winners ==
Year	Winner	Age	Jockey	Trainer	Owner	Distance	Time	Purse	Grade	Ref
Bryan Station Stakes – (three-year-old colts and geldings)
2025	Troubleshooting	3	Tyler Gaffalione	Gregory D. Foley	Donamire Farm	1 mile	1:35.78	$600,000	III	
2024	Brilliant Berti	3	Brian Hernandez Jr.	Cherie DeVaux	Klein Racing	1 mile	1:34.40	$591,625	III	
2023	Runaway Storm	3	Colby J. Hernandez	Ethan W. West	Robert J. Hunt	1 mile	1:35.93	$297,307	III	
2022	Balnikhov (IRE)	3	Tyler Gaffalione	Phillip D'Amato	Little Red Feather Racing, Madaket Stables & Old Bones Racing Stable	1 mile	1:35.48	$271,088	III	
2021	Camp Hope	3	Brian Hernandez Jr.	Kenneth G. McPeek	Walking L Thoroughbreds	1 mile	1:38.32	$150,000		
2020	Ever Dangerous	3	Javier Castellano	George Weaver	Reeves Thoroughbred Racing & R. A. Hill Stable	1 1/8 miles	1:48.74	$150,000		
2016–2019		Race not held								
2015	Tweet Kitten	3	Javier Castellano	Chad C. Brown	Kenneth L. and Sarah K. Ramsey	1 1/8 miles	1:51.79	$100,000		
2010–2014		Race not held								
2009	Get Stormy	3	Javier Castellano	Thomas M. Bush	Sullimar Stable	1 mile	1:37.49	$125,000	III	
2008	† Cowboy Cal	3	John R. Velazquez	Todd A. Pletcher	Robert C. & Janice McNair	1 mile	1:35.70	$150,000	III	
2007	Inca King	3	Shaun Bridgmohan	Steven M. Asmussen	Heiligbrodt Racing Stable	1 mile	1:35.88	$150,000	Listed	
2006	Kip Deville	3	Julien R. Leparoux	Richard E. Dutrow Jr.	IEAH Stables	1 mile	1:35.36	$150,000	Listed	
2005	T. D. Vance	3	Edgar S. Prado	H. Graham Motion	Courtlandt Farms	1 mile	1:34.65	$150,000	Listed	
Storm Cat Stakes
2004	Good Reward	3	Edgar S. Prado	Claude R. McGaughey III	Ogden Mills Phipps et al.	1 mile	1:36.50	$110,600	Listed	
2003	Remind	3	Jerry D. Bailey	William I. Mott	Claiborne Farm	1 mile	1:36.33	$84,225	Listed	
2002	February Storm	3	Calvin H. Borel	D. Wayne Lukas	The Thoroughbred Corporation	1 mile	1:36.52	$83,925	Listed	
Bryan Station Stakes – (Fillies and mares, three-years-old and older)
2001	Gino's Spirits (GB)	5	Pat Day	W. Elliott Walden	Rio Aventura Stables & Tom Van Meter	1 mile	1:36.06	$84,750	Listed	
2000	White Beauty	5	Timothy Doocy	Terry J. Brennan	Greg Rand & Terry J. Brennan	1 mile	1:35.20	$77,750	Listed	
1999	Pratella	4	Larry Melancon	Burk Kessinger Jr.	Bruce Barton & Alvin D. Haynes	1 mile	1:34.93	$65,625	Listed	Division 1
1999	Mingling Glances	5	Larry Melancon	Burk Kessinger Jr.	Morven Stud Farm	1 mile	1:36.39	$75,600	Listed	Division 2
1998	Mingling Glances	4	Pat Day	Burk Kessinger Jr.	Bruce Barton, Alvin D. Haynes & Turf Stable	1 mile	1:34.44	$67,000	Listed	
1997	Cut the Cuteness	5	Michael Rowland	Carl Bowman	Alfred & Mark Corrado	1 mile	1:35.63	$61,000	Listed	
1996	Mariuka	3	Willie Martinez	Charles LoPresti	Calumet Farm	1 mile	1:35.64	$68,500	Listed	Division 1
1996	Vice On Ice	5	Shane Sellers	William I. Mott	Mathew K. Firestone	1 mile	1:35.71	$57,250	Listed	Division 2
1995	Very Special Lite	5	Aaron Gryder	W. Elliott Walden	Prestonwood Farm	1 mile	1:33:60	$60,680	Listed	
1994	Vinista	4	Shane Sellers	Alex Hassinger Jr.	Allen E. Paulson	1 1/16 miles	1:46.21	$54,000		
1993	Gray Cashmere	4	Jose Santos	Peter M. Vestal	Peter S. Willmott	1 1/16 miles	1:44.44	$53,700	Listed	

Legend:
Dirt Turf
Notes:
† In the 2008 running of the event Seaspeak was first past the finishing post but was disqualified for interference in the stretch run. Cowboy Cal was declared the official winner of the event and Seaspeak was placed second.

== See also ==
- List of American and Canadian Graded races
