= John C. Harris Stakes =

- Class: Grade III
- Location: Santa Anita Park; Arcadia, California, United States
- Inaugurated: 2012 (as Unzip Me Stakes)
- Race type: Thoroughbred – Flat racing
- Website: Santa Anita

Race information
- Distance: about 6 1/2 furlongs
- Surface: Turf
- Track: Left-handed
- Qualification: Three-year-old fillies
- Weight: 124 lbs with allowances
- Purse: $100,000 (2025)

The John C. Harris Stakes is a Grade III American Thoroughbred horse race for three-year-old fillies over a distance of about 6 1/2 furlongs on the Downhill turf course scheduled annually late September or early October at Santa Anita Park in Arcadia, California. The event currently carries a purse of $100,000.

== History ==
The event was inaugurated on 29 September 2012 as the Unzip Me Stakes at Santa Anita Park as the eleventh race on the racecard. Unzip Me was a California-bred mare who won graded events in California and Canada winning 10 stakes in her career and $959,228 in stakes winnings.

The inaugural event was won by the British-bred filly Byrama, who started as the 13/5 favorite and was ridden by jockey Rafael Bejarano gained the upper hand in the stretch run and won by a half-length in a time of 1:12.53. Later in her career Byrama won the Grade I Vanity Handicap at Hollywood Park.

The 2016 winner, British-bred Belvoir Bay had a fine career culminating in winning the 2019 Grade I Breeders' Cup Turf Sprint at Santa Anita Park.

In 2019 the event was moved to the turf course proper after a series of catastrophic breakdowns occurred on the Downhill turf course. The event was held over the shortened distance of 5 1/2 furlongs. The winner Don't Sell set a new track record for the distance of 1:01.58.

In 2020 the event was held once again on the main turf course and the winner Bulletproof One broke the track record for the 5 1/2 furlongs distance in a time of 1:01.12. In 2021 the event returned back to the Downhill Turf track.

In 2025 the event was upgraded to Grade III by the Thoroughbred Owners and Breeders Association. Prior to releasing the Fall 2025 Santa Anita Park Stakes schedule the track administration announced that the event would be renamed to the John C. Harris Stakes in honor of John C. Harris, the late California owner/breeder who served on the boards of numerous California and national racing organizations, and in accepting accolades for his high-quality runners. John C. Harris was co-owner and bred Unzip Me in partnership.

== Records ==
Speed record:

- 5 1/2 furlongs: 1:01.12 – Bulletproof One (2020) (New Track Record)
- abt. 6 1/2 furlongs: 1:11.35 – Ruby Nell (2018)

Margins:

- 3 lengths – Pontchatrain (2013)

Most wins by a jockey:

- 3 – Rafael Bejarano (2012, 2015, 2018)

Most wins by a trainer:

- 4 – Peter L. Miller (2016, 2017, 2020, 2021)

Most wins by an owner:

- 3 – Gary Barber (2016, 2017, 2020)

== Winners ==
Year	Winner	Jockey	Trainer	Owner	Distance	Time	Purse	Grade	Ref
John C. Harris Stakes
2026	Little Opal	Emisael Jaramillo	Doug F. O'Neill	Donald R. Dizney	abt. 6 1/2 furlongs	1:12.76	$100,000	III	
2025	Innovative	Ricardo Gonzalez	Philip D'Amato	Little Red Feather Racing & Sterling Stables, LLC	abt. 6 1/2 furlongs	1:12.98	$103,500	III	
Unzip Me Stakes
2024	Toupie	Flavien Prat	H. Graham Motion	Wertheimer et Frère	abt. 6 1/2 furlongs	1:11.94	$102,500	Listed	
2023	Ruby Nell	Edwin Maldonado	Richard E. Mandella	Spendthrift Farm	abt. 6 1/2 furlongs	1:11.35	$102,500	Listed	
2022	Connie Swingle	Kyle Frey	Philip D'Amato	Nicholas B. Alexander	abt. 6 1/2 furlongs	1:11.87	$115,040	Listed	
2021	Zero Tolerance	Flavien Prat	Peter L. Miller	Custom Truck Accessories, Jason Hall, Joe Kelly & Michael Riordan	abt. 6 1/2 furlongs	1:11.67	$82,000	Listed	
2020	Bulletproof One	Ricardo Gonzalez	Peter L. Miller	Eclipse Thoroughbred Partners, Wachtel Stable, Cecil and Gary Barber	abt. 5 1/2 furlongs	1:01.12	$94,000	Listed	
2019	Don't Sell	Evin Roman	Doug F. O'Neill	Reddam Racing	5 1/2 furlongs	1:01.58	$100,205		
2018	Travieza	Rafael Bejarano	Doug F. O'Neill	W.C. Racing & Greg Lewis	abt. 6 1/2 furlongs	1:12.42	$86,115		
2017	Storm the Hill	Corey Nakatani	Peter L. Miller	Gary Barber, Silver Ranch Stable & Wachtel Stable	abt. 6 1/2 furlongs	1:12:21	$82,435		
2016	Belvoir Bay (GB)	Norberto Arroyo Jr.	Peter L. Miller	Team Valor International & Gary Barber	abt. 6 1/2 furlongs	1:12.26	$78,835		
2015	Singing Kitty	Rafael Bejarano	Matthew Chew	Chris Aulds & Peter Jeong	abt. 6 1/2 furlongs	1:13.34	$86,170		
2014	Alexis Tangier	Victor Espinoza	Richard E. Mandella	Ran Jan Racing	abt. 6 1/2 furlongs	1:12.50	$78,700		
2013	Pontchatrain	Gary L. Stevens	Thomas F. Proctor	Glen Hill Farm	abt. 6 1/2 furlongs	1:11.86	$82,670		
2012	Byrama (GB)	Rafael Bejarano	Simon Callaghan	Eclipse Thoroughbred Partners	abt. 6 1/2 furlongs	1:12.53	$76,720		

Legend:
Turf

== See also ==
- List of American and Canadian Graded races
