= Del Mar Juvenile Turf Stakes =

- Class: Grade III
- Location: Del Mar Racetrack; Del Mar, California, United States
- Inaugurated: 2012 (as Oak Tree Juvenile Turf Stakes)
- Race type: Thoroughbred – Flat racing
- Website: Del Mar

Race information
- Distance: 1 mile
- Surface: turf
- Track: left-handed
- Qualification: Two-year-olds
- Weight: 123 lbs with allowances
- Purse: $100,000 (since 2012)

The Del Mar Juvenile Turf Stakes is a Grade II American Thoroughbred horse race for two-year-olds over a distance of one mile on the turf track scheduled annually in September at Del Mar Racetrack in Del Mar, California. The event currently carries a purse of $100,000.

== History ==
The inaugural running of the event was on September 5, 2012, as the Oak Tree Juvenile Turf Stakes. Del Mar added two new juvenile turf stakes to its schedule in conjunction with the Oak Tree Racing Association during their 2012 meeting. The Oak Tree Racing Association had been idle since 2010. The races, meant as stepping stones toward the two Breeders’ Cup's juvenile grass offerings, also expand the track's emphasis on its 2-year-old program.

In 2015 Del Mar administration renamed the event to the Del Mar Juvenile Turf Stakes after Oak Tree Racing Association moved their meeting to the Alameda County Fairgrounds in Pleasanton.

In 2022 the American Graded Stakes Committee upgraded the classification of the event to Grade III.

The best performance by a winner of this event in the Breeders' Cup Juvenile Turf was in 2021 when Mackinnon finished third.

== Records ==
Speed record:

- 1 mile: 1:34.36 – Diamond Bachelor (2013)

Margins:

- 4 1/4 lengths – Packs A Wahlop (2022)

Most wins by a jockey:

- 3 – Juan J. Hernandez (2021, 2023, 2026)

Most wins by a trainer:

- 3 – Jeff Mullins (2012, 2022, 2024)
- 3 – John W. Sadler (2014, 2019, 2025)

Most wins by an owner:

- 3 – Hronis Racing (2014, 2019, 2025)

== Winners ==
Year	Winner	Jockey	Trainer	Owner	Distance	Time	Purse	Grade	Ref
Del Mar Juvenile Turf Stakes
2026	Observed	Juan J. Hernandez	Jonathan Thomas	Bridlewood Farm, Eclipse Thoroughbred Partners and Robert V. LaPenta	1 mile	1:36.40	$100,000	III	
2025	Hey Nay Nay (IRE)	Hector Berrios	John W. Sadler	Hronis Racing & Iapetus Racing	1 mile	1:35.57	$104,000	III	
2024	Artislas	Reylu Gutierrez	Jeff Mullins	Irving Ventures, Michelle Arthur, William Meathe, Jeanne Tumanjan	1 mile	1:36.53	$104,000	III	
2023	Endlessly	Juan J. Hernandez	Michael McCarthy	Amerman Racing	1 mile	1:35.28	$101,500	III	
2022	Packs A Wahlop	Mike E. Smith	Jeff Mullins	Red Baron's Barn & Rancho Temescal	1 mile	1:35.96	$104,500	III	
2021	Mackinnon	Juan J. Hernandez	Doug F. O'Neill	ERJ Racing & Dave Kenney	1 mile	1:36.24	$102,000	Listed	
2020	Big Fish	Victor Espinoza	David Hofmans	Legacy Ranch	1 mile	1:38.21	$102,500	Listed	
2019	Encoder	Flavien Prat	John W. Sadler	Hronis Racing	1 mile	1:35.31	$100,000	Listed	
2018	King of Speed	Gary L. Stevens	Jeffrey L. Bonde	Del Secco DCS Racing	1 mile	1:36.77	$101,725	Listed	
2017	Encumbered	Mario Gutierrez	Simon Callaghan	Reddam Racing	1 mile	1:35.90	$103,105	Listed	
2016	Bowie's Hero	Rafael Bejarano	Philip D'Amato	Pope, Pope Jr. & Marc McLean	1 mile	1:36.40	$102,760	Listed	
2015	Hollywood Don	Brice Blanc	Peter L. Miller	Rockingham Ranch	1 mile	1:35.46	$101,500	Listed	
Oak Tree Juvenile Turf Stakes
2014	Daddy D T	Corey Nakatani	John W. Sadler	Hronis Racing	1 mile	1:36.35	$101,000		
2013	Diamond Bachelor	Julien Leparoux	Patrick Biancone	Diamond 100 Racing Club	1 mile	1:34.36	$100,750		
2012	Dry Summer	Joseph Talamo	Jeff Mullins	Sam Britt & Michael House	1 mile	1:35.16	$100,000	Listed	

Legend:
Turf

== See also ==
- List of American and Canadian Graded races
