= Mahony Stakes =

Flat thoroughbred horse race in America

- Class: Grade III
- Location: Saratoga Race Course; Saratoga Springs, New York, United States
- Inaugurated: 2019
- Race type: Thoroughbred - Flat racing
- Website: NYRA

Race information
- Distance: 5 1/2 furlongs
- Surface: Turf
- Track: Left-handed
- Qualification: Three-year-olds
- Weight: 122 lbs with allowances
- Purse: $175,000 (2025)

The Mahony Stakes is a Grade III American Thoroughbred horse race for three-year-olds over a distance of 5 1/2 furlongs on the turf course scheduled annually in August at Saratoga Race Course in Saratoga Springs, New York. The event currently carries a purse of $175,000.

== History ==
The event is named in honor of Patrick Mahony, the longtime senior vice president of mutuels at NYRA. Mahony, who spent more than 50 years in the racing industry, retired in 2016.

The event was inaugurated on August 7, 2019 and was won by the 6/5 favorite Archidust who was ridden by ridden by US Hall of Fame jockey Javier Castellano by 3 lengths in a time of 1:00.80. This continues to be the stakes record time for the event.

In 2021 the event was classified as Listed status.

In 2025 the event was upgraded to Grade III by the Thoroughbred Owners and Breeders Association.

== Records ==
Speed record:

- 5 1/2 furlongs (turf): 1:00.80 - Archidust (2019)

Margins:

- 3 1/4 lengths - Jack and Noah (2020)

Most wins by a jockey:

- 2 - John R. Velazquez (2020, 2021)

Most wins by a trainer:

- No trainer has won this race more than once.

Most wins by an owner:

- No owner has won this race more than once.

== Winners ==
Year	Winner	Jockey	Trainer	Owner	Distance	Time	Purse	Grade	Ref
2026	Stradale	Jose L. Ortiz	Steven M. Asmussen	Kaleem Shah	5 1/2 furlongs	1:03.34	$225,000	III	
2025	Spiced Up	Junior Alvarado	William I. Mott	Juddmonte Farm	5 1/2 furlongs	1:01.22	$175,000	III	
2024	Fandom (GB)	Dylan Davis	Brad H. Cox	Stonestreet Stables	5 1/2 furlongs	1:02.87	$150,000	Listed	
2023	Closethegame Sugar	Jose Lezcano	Adam Rice	Adam Rice & Sugar Diaz	5 1/2 furlongs	1:02.54	$150,000	Listed	
2022	Big Invasion	Joel Rosario	Christophe Clement	Reeves Thoroughbred Racing	5 1/2 furlongs	1:01.42	$150,000	Listed	
2021	Arrest Me Red	John R. Velazquez	Wesley A. Ward	Lael Stables	5 1/2 furlongs	1:01.59	$116,400	Listed	
2020	Jack and Noah (FR)	John R. Velazquez	Mark E. Casse	Gary Barber	5 1/2 furlongs	1:01.28	$85,000		
2019	Archidust	Javier Castellano	Jorge Navarro	Ivan Rodriguez, Albert & Michelle Crawford	5 1/2 furlongs	1:00.80	$100,300		

== See also ==
- List of American and Canadian Graded races
