= Saratoga Oaks =

Saratoga Oaks Stakes
- Class: Grade II
- Location: Saratoga Race Course; Saratoga Springs, New York, United States
- Inaugurated: 2019 (as Saratoga Oaks Invitational Stakes)
- Sponsor: Fasig-Tipton (2025)
- Website: NYRA

Race information
- Distance: 1 3/16 miles
- Surface: Turf
- Track: Left-handed
- Qualification: Three-year-old fillies
- Weight: 121 lbs
- Purse: US$500,000 (since 2025)

The Saratoga Oaks Stakes is a Grade II American Thoroughbred horse race for three-year-old fillies and older run over a distance of one and three-sixteenths miles on the turf held annually in August at Saratoga Race Course in Saratoga Springs, New York.

== History ==
In 2019 the New York Racing Association with the influx of racino dollars created a new racing series for three year old fillies called the Turf Tiara. The Saratoga Oaks Invitational Stakes was positioned as the second leg of the new three race series. The other events of the Turf Tiara are the Belmont Oaks and the Jockey Club Oaks at Belmont Park.

The event's inaugural running was on 2 August 2019 and was won by Ashbrook Farm & BBN Racing's Concrete Rose who was ridden by jockey Julien R. Leparoux and trained by trainer George Arnold II comfortably leading all the way by 4 3/4 lengths as the 3/10 odds on favorite by a head in a time of 1:55.34. Concrete Rose was injured soon after and was retired after winning six of her seven lifetime starts.

In 2021 the event was upgraded in classification by the Thoroughbred Owners and Breeders Association's American Graded Stakes Committee to Grade III and once again upgraded in 2024 to Grade II.

The event was held as an invitation event until 2025.

== Records ==
Speed record:

- 1 3/16 miles: 1:52.60 Laurelin (IRE) (2025)

Margins:

- 4 3/4 lengths – Concrete Rose (2019)

Most wins by an owner:

- 3 – Godolphin Racing (2020, 2022, 2024)

Most wins by a jockey:

- 2 – Flavien Prat (2021, 2023)
- 2 – William Buick (2022, 2024)

Most wins by a trainer:

- 2 – Charlie Appleby (2022, 2024)

== Winners ==
Year	Winner	Jockey	Trainer	Owner	Distance	Time	Purse	Grade	Ref
Saratoga Oaks
2026	Kentucky Belle	Irad Ortiz Jr.	Brad H. Cox	WinStar Farm	1 3/16 miles	1:53.80	$500,000	II	
Saratoga Oaks Invitational Stakes
2025	Laurelin (IRE)	Kendrick Carmouche	H. Graham Motion	Newstead Stables	1 3/16 miles	1:52.60	$500,000	II	
2024	Cinderella's Dream (GB)	William Buick	Charlie Appleby	Godolphin Racing	1 3/16 miles	1:54.92	$388,000	II	
2023	Elusive Princess (FR)	Flavien Prat	Jean-Philippe Dubois	LNJ Foxwoods, Ecurie Victoria Dreams, NK Racing & Anthony V. Munafo	1 3/16 miles	1:57.08	$400,000	III	
2022	With The Moonlight (IRE)	William Buick	Charlie Appleby	Godolphin Racing	1 3/16 miles	1:54.60	$651,000	III	
2021	Con Lima	Flavien Prat	Todd A. Pletcher	Eclipse Thoroughbred Partners, Joseph Graffeo, Nikolaus Bock & Troy Johnson	1 3/16 miles	1:54.42	$700,000	III	
2020	Antoinette	John R. Velazquez	William I. Mott	Godolphin Racing	1 3/16 miles	1:53.30	$500,000		
2019	Concrete Rose	Julien R. Leparoux	George Arnold II	Ashbrook Farm & BBN Racing	1 3/16 miles	1:55.34	$750,000		

Legend:
Dirt Turf

== See also ==
- List of American and Canadian Graded races
