= Keeneland =

Equine business based in Lexington, Kentucky, United States

- Interactive map of Keeneland
- Location: Lexington, Kentucky, United States
- Coordinates: 38°2′44″N 84°36′38″W
- Owned by: Keeneland Association Inc.
- Date opened: 1936
- Course type: Flat / Thoroughbred
- Notable races: Ashland Stakes (G1); Turf Mile Stakes (G1); Breeders' Futurity Stakes (G1); Blue Grass Stakes (G1)
- Keeneland
- U.S. National Register of Historic Places
- U.S. National Historic Landmark
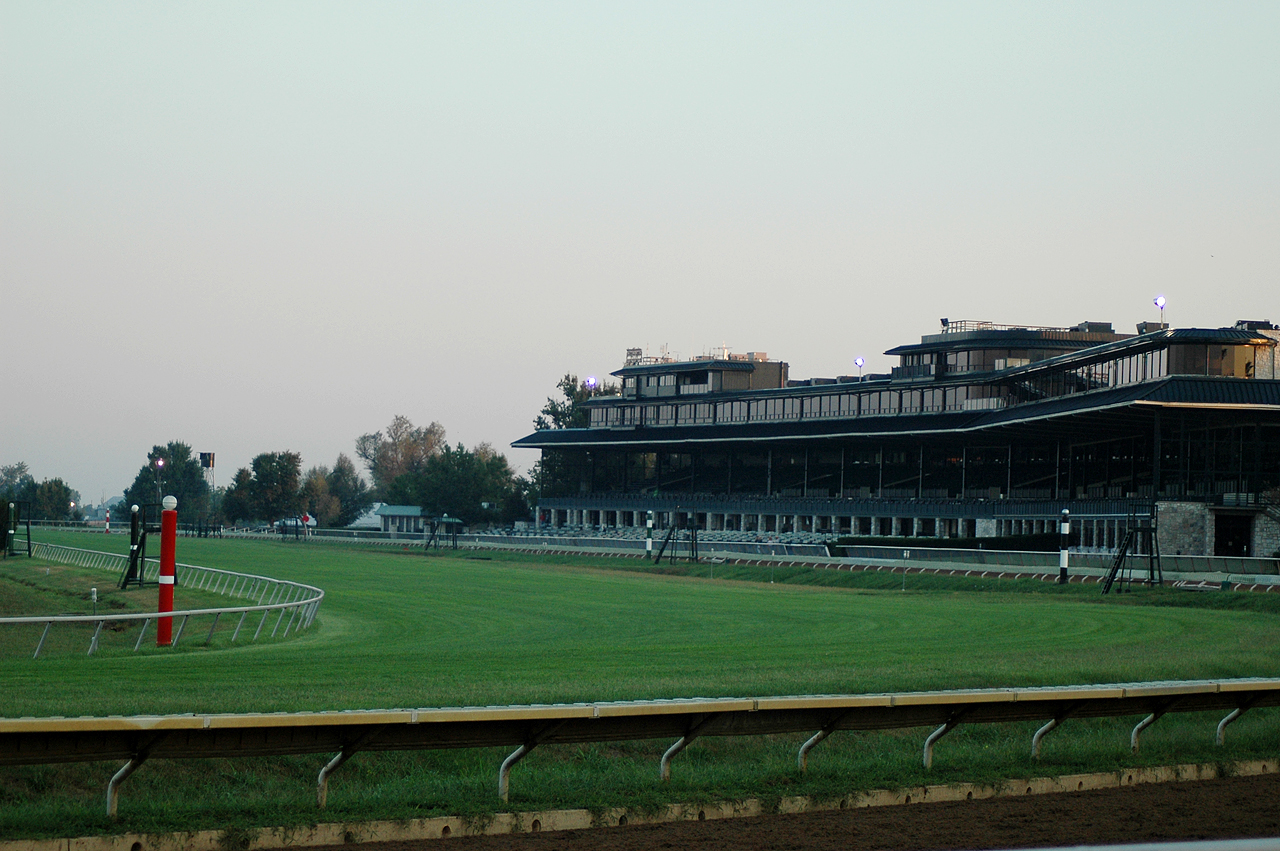
- A view of Keeneland's grandstand at dawn, taken from the last turn leading into the home stretch

- Location within Kentucky Location within the United States
- Built: 1936
- NRHP reference No.: 86003487

Significant dates
- Added to NRHP: September 4, 1986
- Designated NHL: September 4, 1986

Keeneland Association, Inc. is an equine business based in Lexington, Kentucky, United States. It includes two distinct divisions: the Keeneland Race Course, a Thoroughbred racing facility, and Keeneland Sales, a horse auction complex. It is also known for its reference library.

In 2009, the Horseplayers Association of North America introduced a rating system for 65 Thoroughbred racetracks in North America. Keeneland was ranked #1 of the top ten tracks. It is listed on the National Register of Historic Places and designated a National Historic Landmark in 1986.

Keeneland has hosted the Breeders' Cup four times in 2016, 2020, 2022, and 2026.

== History ==
Keeneland originated as a nonprofit racing–auction entity on 147 acres (0.59 km^{2}) of farmland west of Lexington, which had been owned by Jack Keene, a driving force behind the building of the facility. It has used proceeds from races and its auctions to further the thoroughbred industry as well as to contribute to the surrounding community.

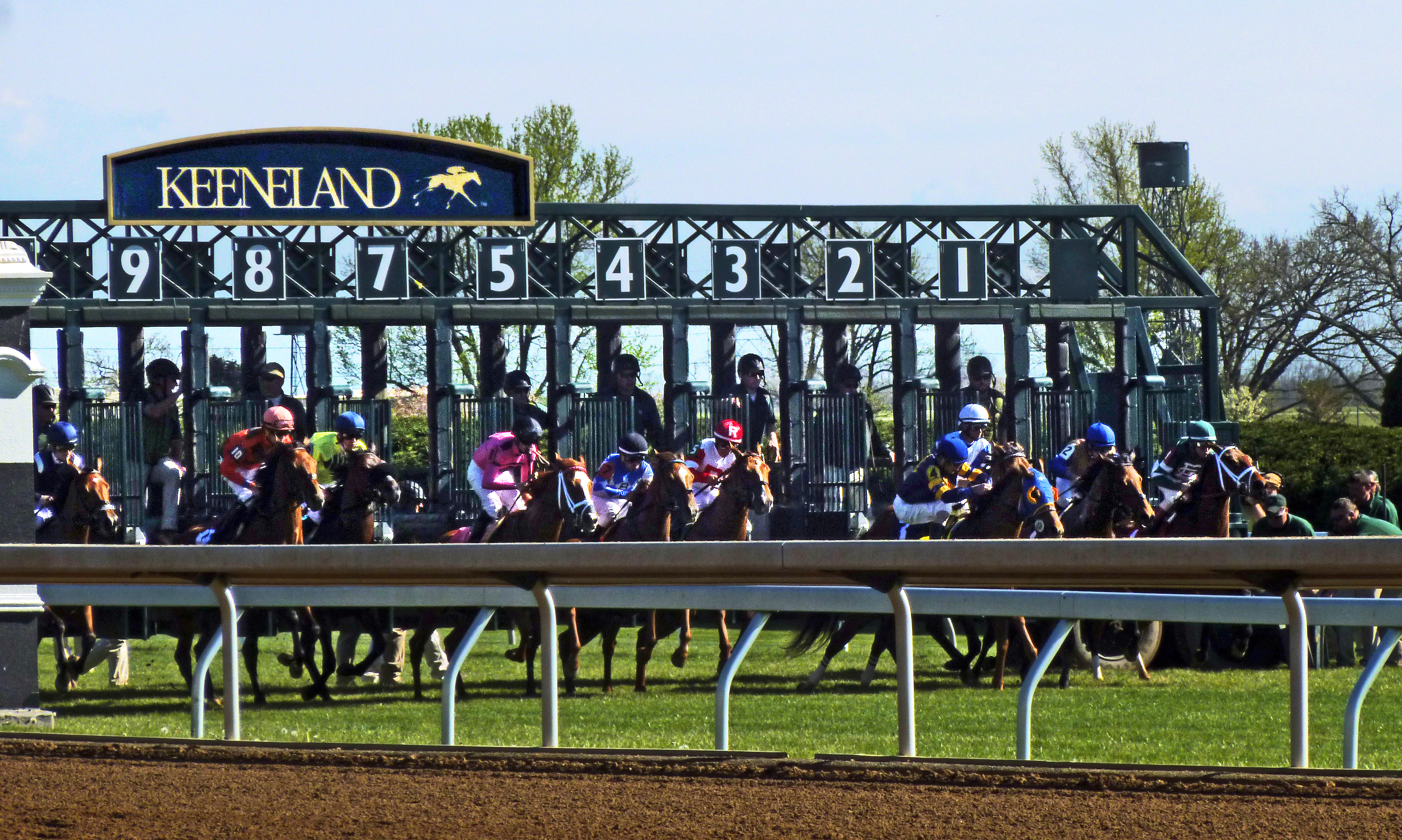
The start of the 2016 Appalachian Stakes, one of many graded races run during Keeneland's spring meet every year.

Keeneland Race Course has conducted live race meets in April and October since 1936. The 15-day spring meet is one of the richest in North America, with fifteen graded stakes races featuring the Blue Grass Stakes, a prep race for the Kentucky Derby. The 17-day fall meet features seventeen graded stakes races, six of which are Grade One events used as Breeders' Cup preps.

Keeneland takes pride in maintaining racing traditions; it was the last track in North America to broadcast race calls over its public-address system, not doing so until 1997. Most of the racing scenes of the 2003 movie Seabiscuit were shot at Keeneland, in part because of the track's "retro feel". Keeneland was also used in the 2005 movie Dreamer and the 2010 movie Secretariat for several key scenes, including the running of the Belmont Stakes where the horse completes the Triple Crown.

Nonetheless, Keeneland has adopted several innovations. In 1984 in preparation for a visit by Queen Elizabeth II, it built a trackside Winner's Circle and created the Queen Elizabeth II Challenge Cup Stakes. In 1985, it installed a turf course over which the Challenge Cup, as well as a number of other turf races, is now run. It reshaped the main track and replaced the dirt surface with the proprietary Polytrack surface over the summer of 2006 in time for its fall race meeting. The track was restored to a dirt racing surface during the summer of 2014.

Keeneland was designated a National Historic Landmark in 1986, for its role in the growth of the horseracing sport and its revitalization in Lexington.

Keeneland hosted the Breeders' Cup for the first time in 2015. The Breeders' Cup Classic was won by Triple Crown winner American Pharoah by six and a half lengths. He became the first to win the unofficial Grand Slam of Thoroughbred racing; winning the Kentucky Derby, Preakness Stakes, Belmont Stakes and Breeders' Cup Classic. Many horse industry personnel were skeptical of Keeneland as a suitable venue because the track and town were too small to host such a large event. However it was a huge success and even had a Thoroughbred Daily News writer report "I was wrong...it was spectacular" and how he "couldn't be more impressed". In August 2018 Keeneland was named as the host of the 2020 Breeders' Cup.

In 2020 due to the COVID-19 pandemic in the United States, Keeneland cancelled their Spring meeting which was to be held from 2 April 2020 to 24 April 2020 and moved their meet to a shortened five day period from 8 July 2020 to 12 July 2020. Five stakes race were not scheduled: Bewitch Stakes, Ben Ali Stakes, Commonwealth Stakes, Doubledogdare Stakes and Lexington Stakes. The Breeders' Cup was won by Authentic, which had won the Kentucky Derby.

Keeneland participates with Thoroughbred Owners and Breeders Association (TOBA), i.e., thoroughbred owners & breeders, professionals, and others who support and promote Thoroughbred ownership (and sponsorship), such as through networking and a high level of education.

== Keeneland Sales ==
Keeneland is the world's largest Thoroughbred auction house, conducting three sales annually: The September Yearling Sale, November Breeding Stock Sale, and January Horses of All Ages Sale. Horses sold at Keeneland sales include 82 horses that won 88 Breeders' Cup World Championship races; 19 Kentucky Derby winners; 21 Preakness winners; 18 Belmont winners; 11 recipients of the Eclipse Award as Horse of the Year; and five Epsom Derby winners. Graduates of Keeneland sales. The Keeneland Team travels to over 25 countries and invests in over $700,000 annually towards international market development to deliver the world's deepest buying bench. The auctions have sold horses to owners worldwide that have won large-scale races. Nine of the 14 highest ranked horses in the Kentucky Oaks were sold in sales through Keeneland.

== Layout ==
The track has a 1 1/16 miles (1,700 m) dirt oval and a seven and one-half furlong (0.875 miles (1,408 m)) turf oval. The turf course uses two configurations: the Keeneland Course setup has a temporary rail set 15 feet (4.6 m) out, while the Haggin Course has no temporary rail.

== TV personalities ==
- Mike Battaglia (1974–present)
- Katie Mikolay Gensler (2013–present)

== Keeneland Mark of Distinction ==
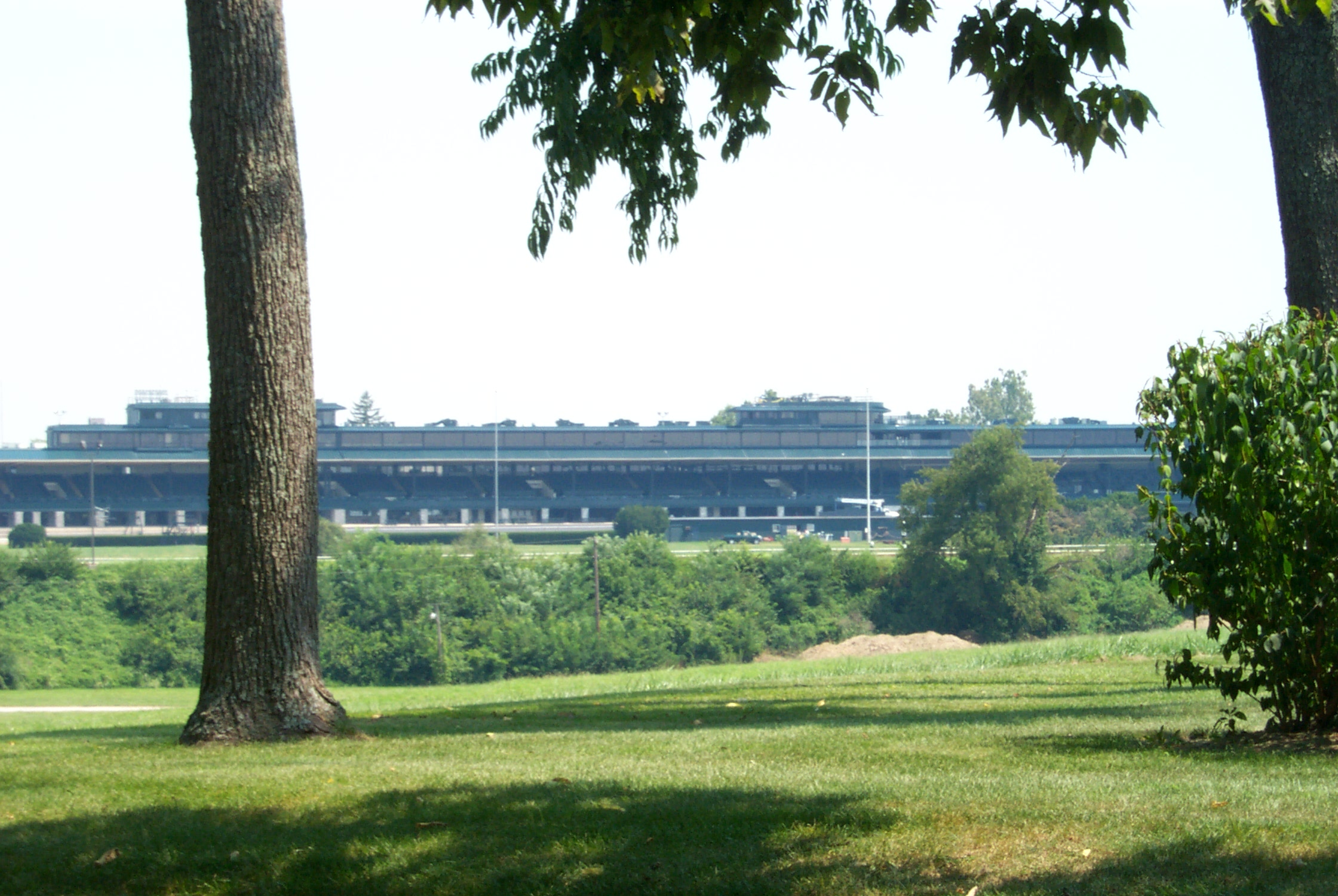
Outside view of Keeneland

Since 1968 Keeneland has honored the contributions of individuals to both Keeneland itself and the Thoroughbred industry with the Mark of Distinction. Recipients of the honor are given a button that bears the colors of their racing or farm silks. Each spring and fall, members of the Keeneland Club wear the button.

== Racing ==
Keeneland has two racing seasons: a Spring Meeting in April and a Fall Meeting in October. The following stakes races have been run at Keeneland, some with changing names and sponsorships over the years.

Grade 1 :

- Alcibiades Stakes
- Ashland Stakes
- Blue Grass Stakes
- Breeders' Futurity Stakes
- First Lady Stakes
- Jenny Wiley Stakes
- Keeneland Turf Mile Stakes
- Madison Stakes
- Maker's Mark Mile Stakes
- Queen Elizabeth II Challenge Cup Stakes
- Spinster Stakes

Grade 2 :

- Appalachian Stakes
- Beaumont Stakes
- Bryan Station Stakes
- Doubledogdare Stakes
- Elkhorn Stakes
- Fayette Stakes
- Franklin Stakes
- Giant's Causeway Stakes
- Jessamine Stakes
- Phoenix Stakes
- Raven Run Stakes
- Shakertown Stakes
- Thoroughbred Club of America Stakes
- Valley View Stakes
- Woodford Stakes

Grade 3 :

- Ben Ali Stakes
- Bewitch Stakes
- Bourbon Stakes
- Commonwealth Stakes
- Dowager Stakes
- Lexington Stakes
- Limestone Stakes
- Perryville Stakes
- Sycamore Stakes
- Transylvania Stakes

Non-graded stakes races

- Indian Summer Stakes
- Lafayette Stakes
- Palisades Stakes

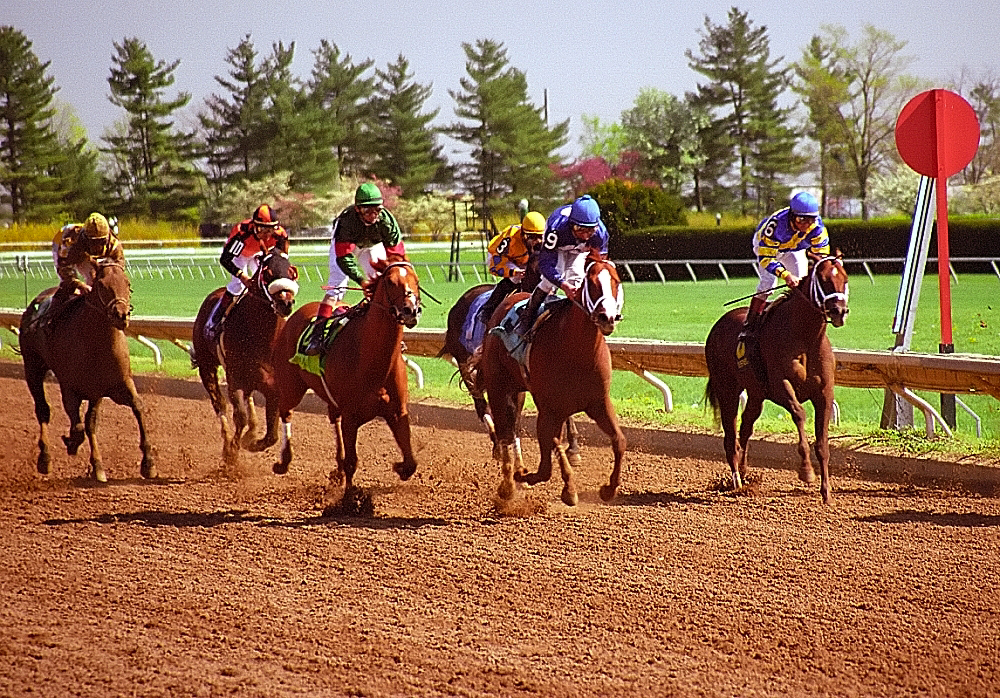
A race at Keeneland
