= Saratoga Race Course =

Horseracing venue in Saratoga Springs, New York

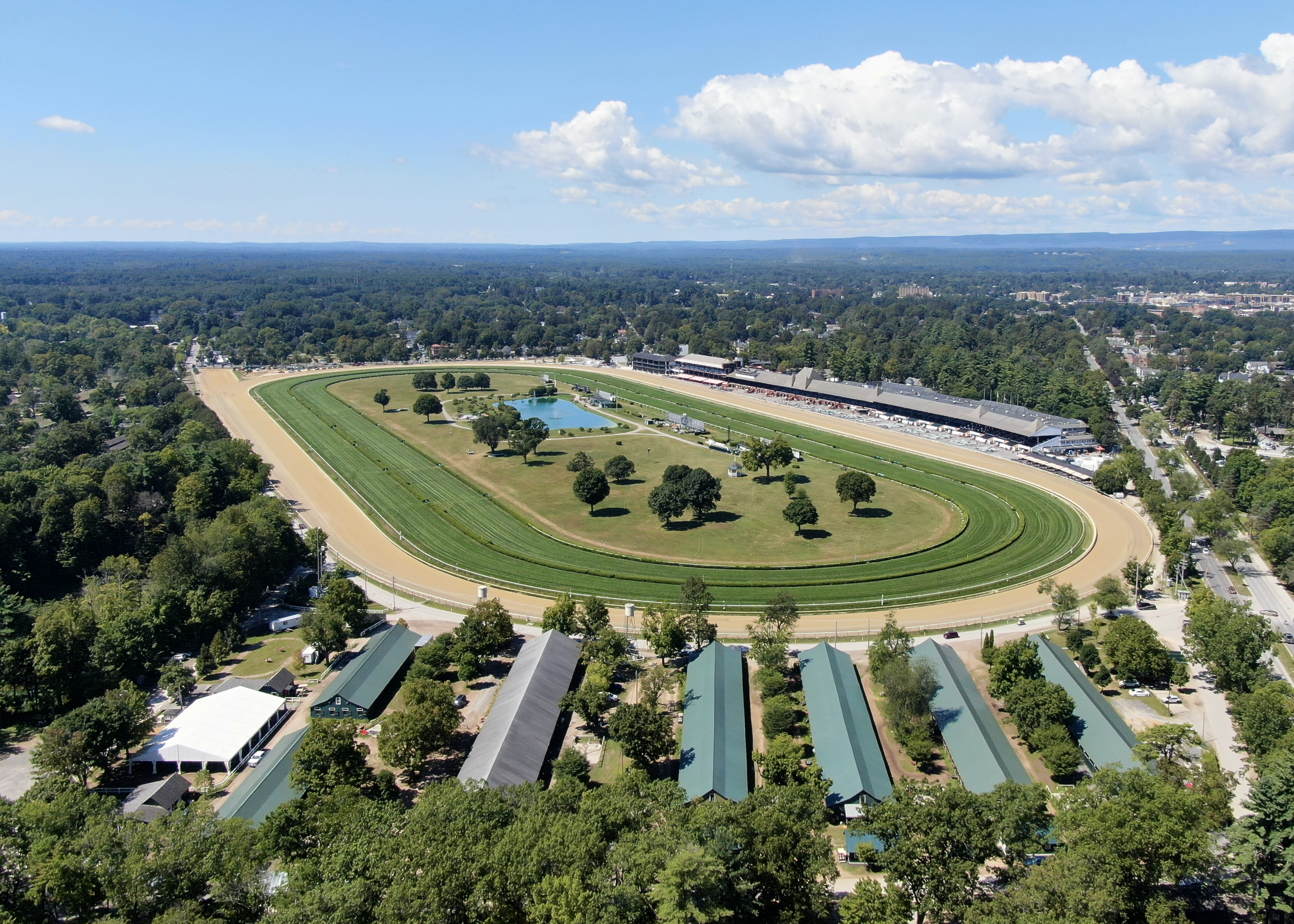
- Aerial view of the race course in 2025
- Interactive map of Saratoga Race Course
- Location: Saratoga Springs, New York, United States
- Coordinates: 43°04′18″N 73°46′07″W
- Owned by: State of New York
- Operated by: New York Racing Association
- Date opened: August 3, 1863 (163 years ago)
- Screened on: MSG Plus (restricted to cable systems in New York City, Northern/Central New Jersey, Fairfield County, Connecticut, and Northeastern Pennsylvania); Capital OTB via WXXA Channel 23.2); NYRA.com/NYRA Now app (Internet); Altitude Sports (Rocky Mountains); Fox Sports 2 FanDuel Sports Network Ohio; FanDuel Sports Network West (Southern California); NBC Sports Network; NBC Television
- Course type: Flat/Thoroughbred
- Notable races: Travers Stakes (G1); Whitney Handicap (G1); Alabama Stakes (G1); Jockey Club Gold Cup (G1)

Saratoga Race Course is a Thoroughbred horse racing track located on Union Avenue in Saratoga Springs, New York, United States. Opened in 1863, it is often considered to be the oldest major sporting venue of any kind in the U.S. It is the fourth oldest racetrack after Pleasanton Fairgrounds Racetrack (1858), Freehold Raceway (1854, closed 2024) and Fair Grounds Race Course in New Orleans (1838).

The racetrack is operated by the New York Racing Association.

The Saratoga meet originally lasted only four days. The meet has been lengthened gradually since that time. From 1962 to 1990, the meet lasted four weeks and began in late July or early August. In 2010, the meet expanded to 40 racing days, with races held five days per week. It lasts from mid-July through Labor Day in early September.

From 2024 to 2026 NYRA scheduled extra racing days at Saratoga while Belmont Park was being rebuilt. The 2026 meet ran 45 days, from July 3 to September 7, and NYRA has said it expects to return to a 40-day meet in 2027.

== History ==
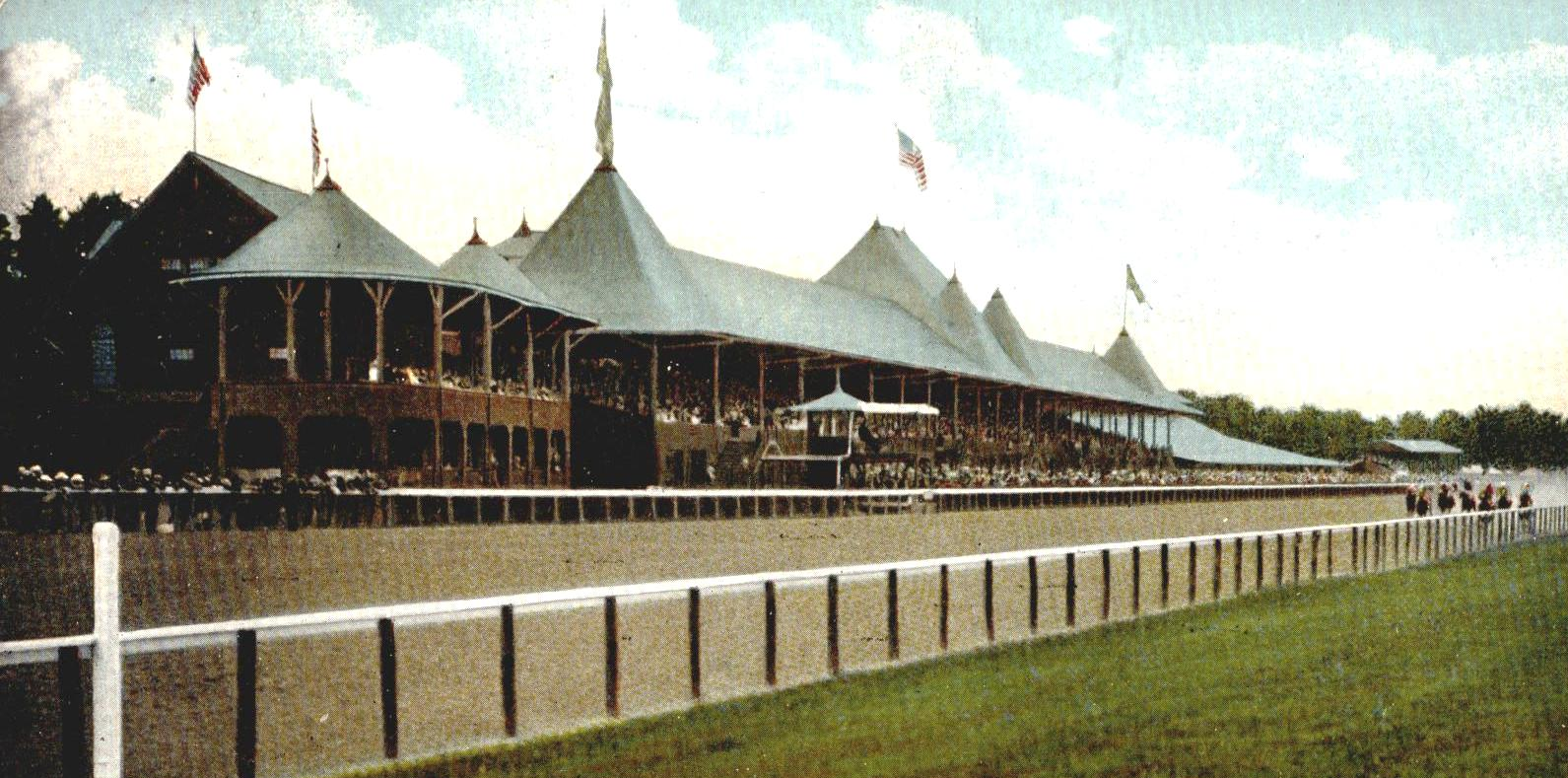
The main track in 1907

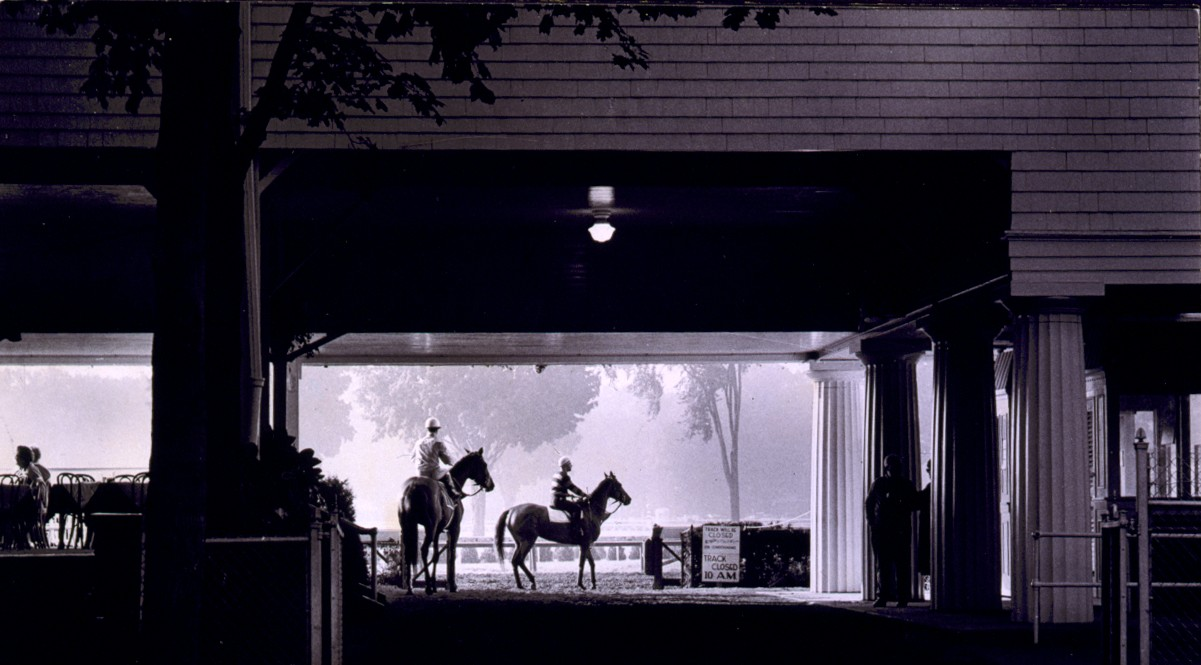
Dawn on the main track in 1963

Saratoga Springs was the site of "trials of speed and exhibition of horses" at county fairs as early as 1822. In 1847, in anticipation of the New York State Fair being held in Saratoga that September, the Saratoga Trotting Course was built, and hosted its first harness race on August 14. The old harness racing track was located just south of the current Oklahoma Track, and today the area is called Horse Haven.

In 1857 the Empire Race Course was opened on an island in the Hudson River near Albany, but was in operation only a short time.

On August 3, 1863, casino operator and future congressman John Morrissey organized the first thoroughbred race card on the Oklahoma Track. After the successful meet ended, Morrissey purchased 125 acres of land across the street from the old standardbred track, built a new grandstand, and dubbed the venue Saratoga Race Course. Among those instrumental to the creation of the new course were John Hunter (later the first chairman of The Jockey Club), William R. Travers, John Morrissey, and Leonard Jerome.

Saratoga Race Course has been in use almost every year since 1864, with only a handful of exceptions. The course was closed in 1896 due to increasing competition among thoroughbred tracks, making the meet at Saratoga not viable that season. Anti-gambling legislation, which had passed in New York, resulted in a cessation in all thoroughbred racing in that state during 1911 and 1912. From 1943 to 1945, racing was curtailed at Saratoga due to travel restrictions during World War II. During those years, the stakes races usually held at Saratoga Race Course were instead contested at Belmont Park.

The late 1800s were a period of decline for the Race Course. In 1892 it was purchased by notorious gambler Gottfried "Dutch Fred" Waldbaum, the operator of the notorious Guttenberg racetrack in North Bergen, New Jersey. In 1901, it was purchased by a group of investors led by William Collins Whitney, who made major improvements and restored its reputation.

The track's first parimutuel betting machines were installed in 1940.

In the 1960s, the grandstand was extended, doubling the track's seating capacity.

In 1999, Saratoga Race Course was rated as Sports Illustrated's #10 sports venue of the 20th century.

The 156th through 158th runnings of the Belmont Stakes were held at Saratoga Race Course, due to construction at Belmont Park.

=== Graveyard of Champions ===
Saratoga Race Course has several nicknames: The Spa (for the nearby mineral springs), the House of Upsets, and the Graveyard of Champions. Famous race horses to lose at the track:

- Man o' War suffered his only defeat in twenty-one starts while racing at Saratoga Race Course, losing to Upset in the 1919 Sanford Stakes
- Gallant Fox, the 1930 Triple Crown winner, was beaten by the 100-1 longshot Jim Dandy in the 1930 Travers Stakes
- Secretariat, the 1973 Triple Crown winner, was defeated by Onion in the 1973 Whitney Handicap
- Rachel Alexandra, the 2009 Horse of the Year, was beaten in the 2010 Personal Ensign Stakes by Persistently, who closed a length and a half in the final 1/16 mile;
- American Pharoah, the 2015 Triple Crown winner and a 1-5 favorite, was upset in the 2015 Travers Stakes by Keen Ice for his second career loss

== Course ==
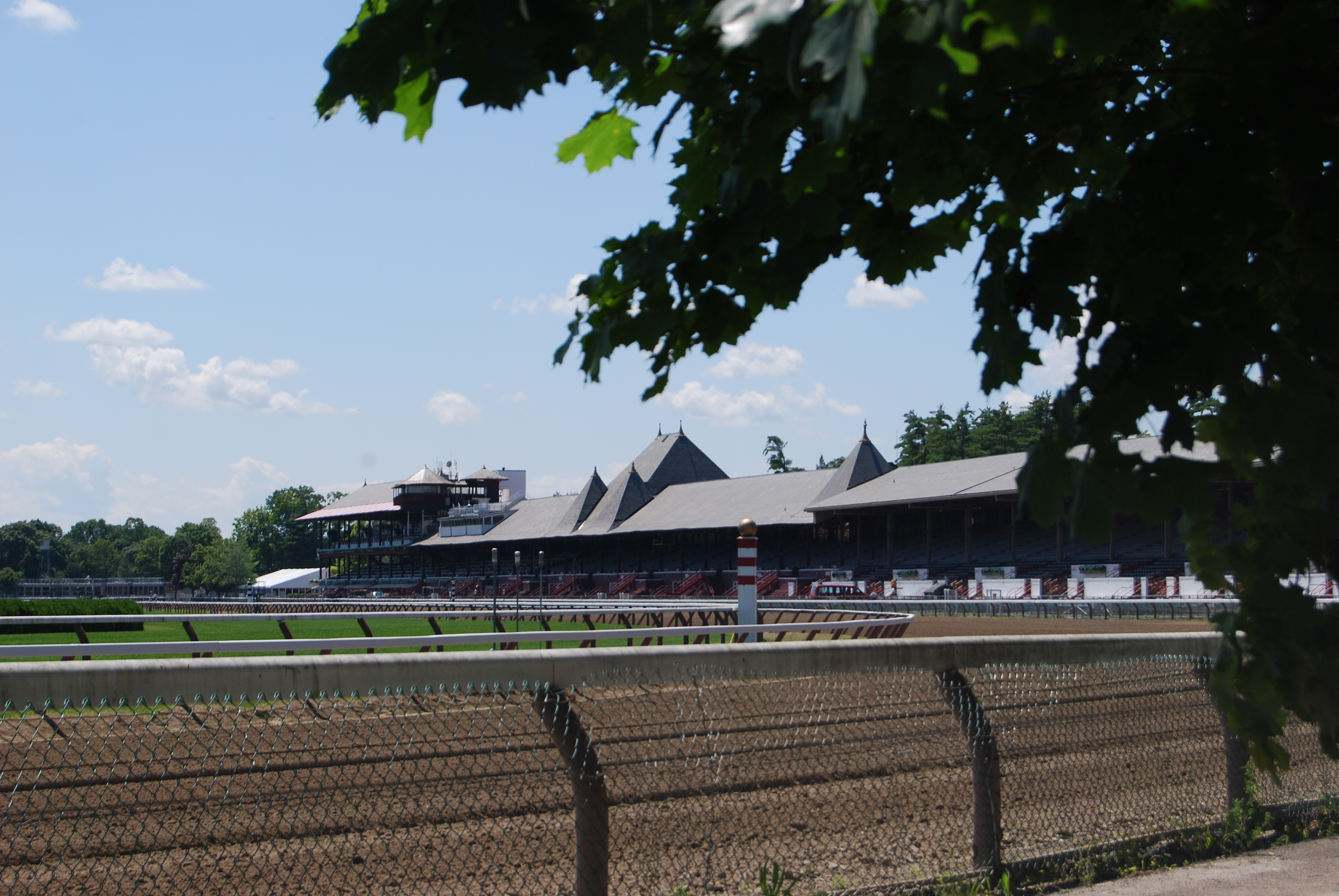
Race course from Union Avenue

As is the case with the other two tracks operated by the New York Racing Association – Aqueduct and Belmont Park – there are three separate tracks in the main course at Saratoga Race Course:

- a main (dirt) track, which, like that at Aqueduct, has a 1 1/8-mile (9-furlong or 1,811 m) circumference;
  - chute for 7-furlong events near the end of the first turn
  - chute for 1 mile events at the start of the first turn known as the Wilson Chute. Originally was in use until 1972 when an additional parking lot was created. The chute was used in 1992 for one season. The Wilson Chute was later resurrected in 2022 as has been used since.
- a 1-mile (8-furlong) turf track, known officially as the Mellon Turf Course in honor of the Mellon family, whose members include prominent thoroughbred owner/breeder Paul Mellon and his father Andrew Mellon, a former United States Treasury Secretary; and
- an inner turf track, the circumference of which is 7 furlongs (1,408 m).

Steeplechase races are also run at Saratoga Race Course and take place on the inner turf course.

The Oklahoma Training Track, which is across Union Avenue from the main course (was originally named Horse Haven), is used for warmups and training. The Oklahoma Training Track site was the location of the track used for racing at the inaugural meet in 1863; the main grandstand was opened at the current site the following year. On August 3, 2013, the new Whitney Viewing Stand opened at the Oklahoma Track. It allows public viewing of workouts at the track, replicating a former stand from the 19th century.

A distinctive feature of Saratoga Race Course's dirt track was the Wilson Mile chute, which branched off from the clubhouse (first) turn at a 90-degree angle. The chute was dismantled after the 1972 season to make room for additional parking, although in 1992 some one-mile dirt races were brought back at approximately the same location. NYRA announced in January 2022 that the Wilson Mile chute would be rebuilt for the 2022 racing season.

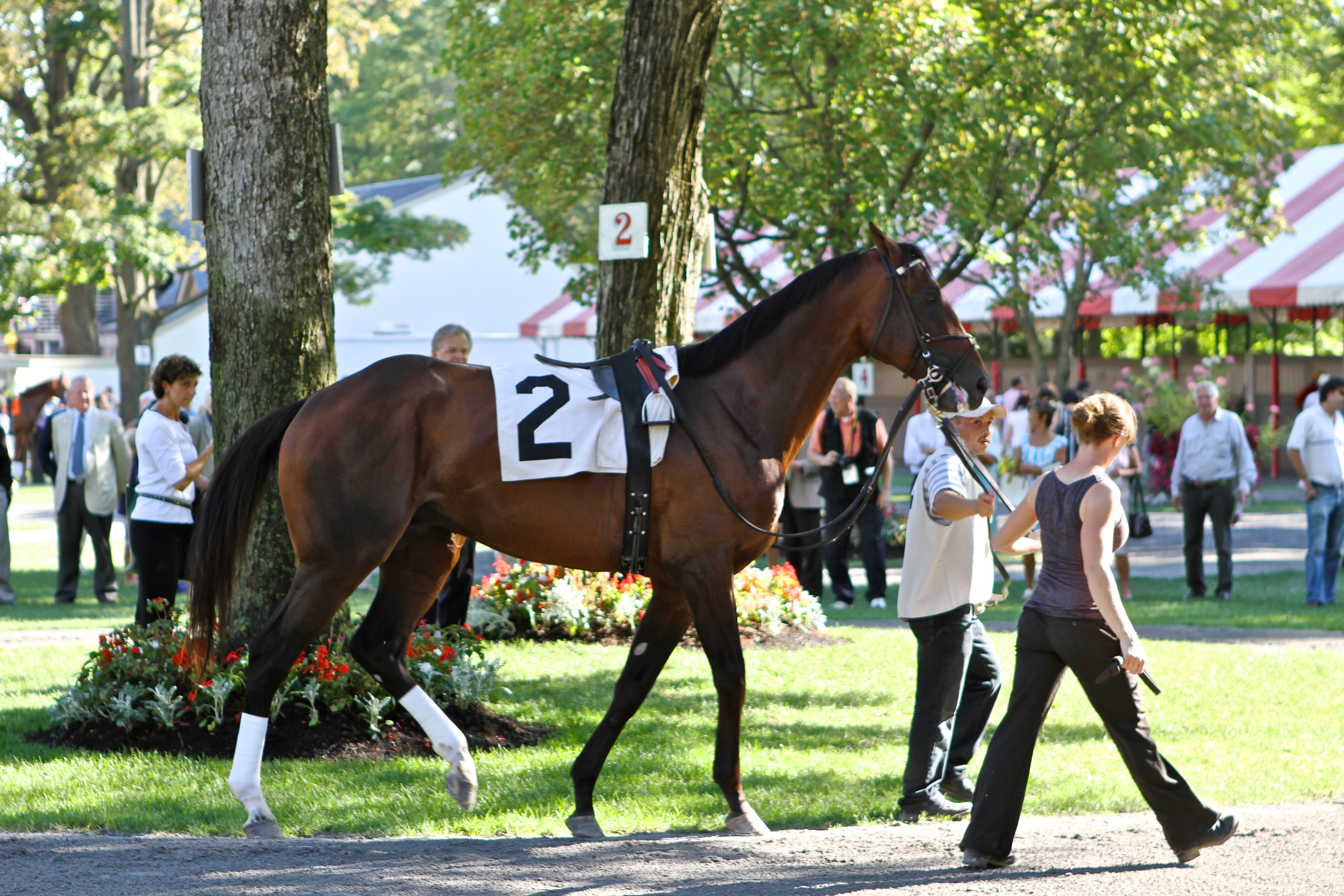
Horse on Paddock of Saratoga Race Course

The grounds at Saratoga Race Course contain several unique features. Prior to each race, a bell is hand rung at exactly 17 minutes prior to scheduled post time for each race to call the jockeys to the paddock. Patrons can get close up views of the horses being led to the paddock as the path from the stables runs through the picnic grounds. There is a mineral spring called the Big Red Spring in the picnic grounds where patrons can partake of the water that made Saratoga Springs famous. A gazebo is a prominent feature of the infield, and a stylized version of the gazebo is part of the Saratoga Race Course logo.

Saratoga Race Course is home to several of the most important races in North America. Since 1864, the track has been the site of the Travers Stakes, the oldest major thoroughbred horse race in the United States. Like the Kentucky Derby, the Travers Stakes is contested on dirt and is open only to three-year-olds, with a purse of $1,250,000. Several other major stakes races are held at Saratoga each year as well, including the Alabama Stakes (for three-year-old fillies), the Hopeful Stakes for two-year-olds, and the Whitney Stakes for three-year-olds and up (a Breeders' Cup Classic "Win and You're In" qualifier).

A new addition in recent years has been "twilight racing", where the first race post time is at 2:30 pm on some days, previously 2:45 PM.

== Equine safety ==
Five horses died from racing injuries and five from training injuries at the 2025 Saratoga meet. At the 2026 meet, which had 3,675 starts in 464 races over 45 days, the state recorded no fatalities during and four training deaths. A horse, Marvelous Madison, was injured in a race and had to be euthanized.

== Races ==
The following are Graded stakes races run at Saratoga in 2025:

Grade I Stakes races:

- Alabama Stakes
- Ballerina Stakes
- Belmont Stakes
- Coaching Club American Oaks
- Diana Stakes
- Forego Stakes
- Fourstardave Handicap
- H. Allen Jerkens Memorial Stakes
- Hopeful Stakes
- Jockey Club Gold Cup
- Personal Ensign Stakes
- Saratoga Derby
- Spinaway Stakes
- Sword Dancer Stakes
- Test Stakes
- Travers Stakes
- Whitney Stakes

Grade II Stakes races:

- Alfred G. Vanderbilt Handicap
- Amsterdam Stakes
- Ballston Spa Stakes
- Bowling Green Stakes
- Caress Stakes
- Glens Falls Stakes
- Honorable Miss Handicap
- Flower Bowl Stakes
- Jim Dandy Stakes
- Lake George Stakes
- Lake Placid Stakes
- National Museum of Racing Hall of Fame Stakes
- Prioress Stakes
- Saratoga Oaks
- Saratoga Special Stakes
- Shuvee Stakes

Grade III Stakes races:

- Adirondack Stakes
- Coronation Cup Stakes
- Forbidden Apple Stakes
- Lake George Stakes
- Mahony Stakes
- Quick Call Stakes
- Sanford Stakes
- Saranac Stakes
- Troy Stakes
- With Anticipation Stakes

Ungraded stakes

- Albany Stakes
- Alydar Stakes
- Bernard Baruch Handicap
- Better Talk Now Stakes
- Birdstone Stakes
- Bolton Landing Stakes
- Curlin Stakes
- De La Rose Stakes
- Evan Shipman Handicap
- Fleet Indian Stakes
- Funny Cide Stakes
- Galway Stakes
- John Morrissey Handicap
- John's Call
- Johnstone Mile
- Lucky Coin Stakes
- Lure Stakes
- P. G. Johnson
- Rick Violette
- Riskaverse
- Saratoga Dew Stakes
- Schuylerville Stakes
- Seeking The Ante
- Shine Again
- Skidmore Stakes
- Smart N Fancy
- Summer Colony Stakes
- Suzie O'Cain (NYB)
- Tale of the Cat Stakes
- Union Avenue Stakes
- West Point Handicap
- Wilton Stakes
- Yaddo Handicap

Discontinued Stakes races:

- Albany Handicap
- Bold Reason Handicap
- Champlain Handicap
- Delaware Handicap
- Flash Stakes
- Grand Union Hotel Stakes
- Huron Handicap
- Kenner Stakes
- Kentucky Stakes
- Merchants and Citizens Handicap
- Saratoga Handicap
- United States Hotel Stakes

Steeplechase:

- New York Turf Writers Cup Handicap (Grade I)
- A. P. Smithwick Memorial Handicap (Grade I)

== Burials ==
Buried at Clare Court Jogging Track are Fourstardave, Mourjane (IRE), Quick Call and A Phenomenon. Champion filly Go For Wand, who suffered a fatal injury during the stretch run of the 1990 Breeders Cup Distaff, is buried in the Saratoga Race Course infield.

== Economy ==
The Saratoga Race Course is a significant contributor to the Saratoga Springs economy. A 2011 economic analysis of the Saratoga Race Course found that visitors of the race track yielded between $39 million and $55 million annually in direct spending, and a total (a sum of the direct effects and the indirect and induced effects of visitor spending) of $67 million and $94 million annually. This spending was a result of expenditures for lodging, meals, entertainment, retail, and transportation in Saratoga County.

In August 2021, the President of the Saratoga County Chamber of Commerce, Todd Shimkus, estimated that the race track had a $240 million annual regional economic impact. The COVID-19 pandemic had a negative impact on small business owners in the city of Saratoga Springs, as the 2020 meet did not allow in-person spectators at the venue.

== See also ==
- New York Racing Association
- Aqueduct Racetrack
- Belmont Park

== Other reading ==
- Heller, Bill. Saratoga Tales: Great Horses, Fearless Jockeys, Shocking Upsets and Incredible Blunders at America's Legendary Race Track (2004). Whitston Publishing Company. ISBN 978-0-87875-551-6.
