= List of graded stakes at Churchill Downs =

The following is a list of graded stakes races held at Churchill Downs in Louisville, Kentucky:

Stakes races at Churchill Downs
Race	Grade	Meet	Surface
Alysheba Stakes	II	Spring	Dirt
American Derby	Listed	Spring	Turf
American Turf Stakes	I	Spring	Turf
Anchorage Stakes	Listed	Spring	Turf
Aristides Stakes	III	Spring	Dirt
Arlington Stakes	III	Spring	Turf
Audubon Stakes	Listed	Spring	Turf
Bashford Manor Stakes	Listed	Spring	Dirt
Blame Stakes	III	Spring	Dirt
Chicago Stakes	II	Spring	Dirt
Chorleywood Stakes	Listed	Spring	Turf
Churchill Distaff Turf Mile Stakes	II	Spring	Turf
Churchill Downs Stakes	I	Spring	Dirt
Debutante Stakes	Listed	Spring	Dirt
Derby City Distaff Stakes	I	Spring	Dirt
Edgewood Stakes	II	Spring	Turf
Eight Belles Stakes	II	Spring	Dirt
Fleur de Lis Stakes	II	Spring	Dirt
Hanshin Stakes	III	Spring	Dirt
Isaac Murphy Marathon Stakes	Listed	Spring	Dirt
Keertana Stakes	Listed	Spring	Turf
Kelly's Landing Stakes	III	Spring	Dirt
Kentucky Derby	I	Spring	Dirt
Kentucky Juvenile Stakes	Listed	Spring	Dirt
Kentucky Oaks	I	Spring	Dirt
Knicks Go Overnight Stakes	Listed–Restricted	Spring	Dirt
La Troienne Stakes	I	Spring	Dirt
Leslie's Lady Stakes	Listed	Spring	Dirt
Louisville Stakes	III	Spring	Turf
Mamzelle Stakes	III	Spring	Turf
Matt Winn Stakes	III	Spring	Dirt
Maxfield Stakes	III	Spring	Dirt
Mighty Beau Stakes	Listed	Spring	Turf
Mint Julep Stakes	III	Spring	Turf
Modesty Stakes	III	Spring	Turf
Monomoy Girl Overnight Stakes	Listed	Spring	Dirt
Opening Verse Stakes	Listed	Spring	Turf
Pat Day Mile Stakes	II	Spring	Dirt
Regret Stakes	III	Spring	Turf
St. Matthews Stakes	Listed–Restricted	Spring	Dirt
Shawnee Stakes	II	Spring	Dirt
Stephen Foster Stakes	I	Spring	Dirt
Tepin Stakes	Listed	Spring	Turf
Turf Classic Stakes	I	Spring	Turf
Twin Spires Turf Sprint Stakes	II	Spring	Turf
Unbridled Sidney Stakes	II	Spring	Turf
William Walker Stakes	Listed	Spring	Turf
Winning Colors Stakes	III	Spring	Dirt
Wise Dan Stakes	II	Spring	Turf
Ack Ack Handicap	III	Fall	
Cardinal Handicap	III	Fall	
Chilukki Stakes	III	Fall	
Clark Stakes	I	Fall	
Commonwealth Turf Stakes	III	Fall	
Dogwood Stakes	III	Fall	
Falls City Handicap	II	Fall	
Golden Rod Stakes	II	Fall	
Iroquois Stakes	III	Fall	
Kentucky Jockey Club Stakes	II	Fall	
Locust Grove Stakes	III	Fall	
Lukas Classic Stakes	III	Fall	
Mrs. Revere Stakes	II	Fall	
Pocahontas Stakes	III	Fall	
River City Handicap	III	Fall	
Street Sense Stakes	III	Fall	
