= Caravel (horse) =

American racehorse

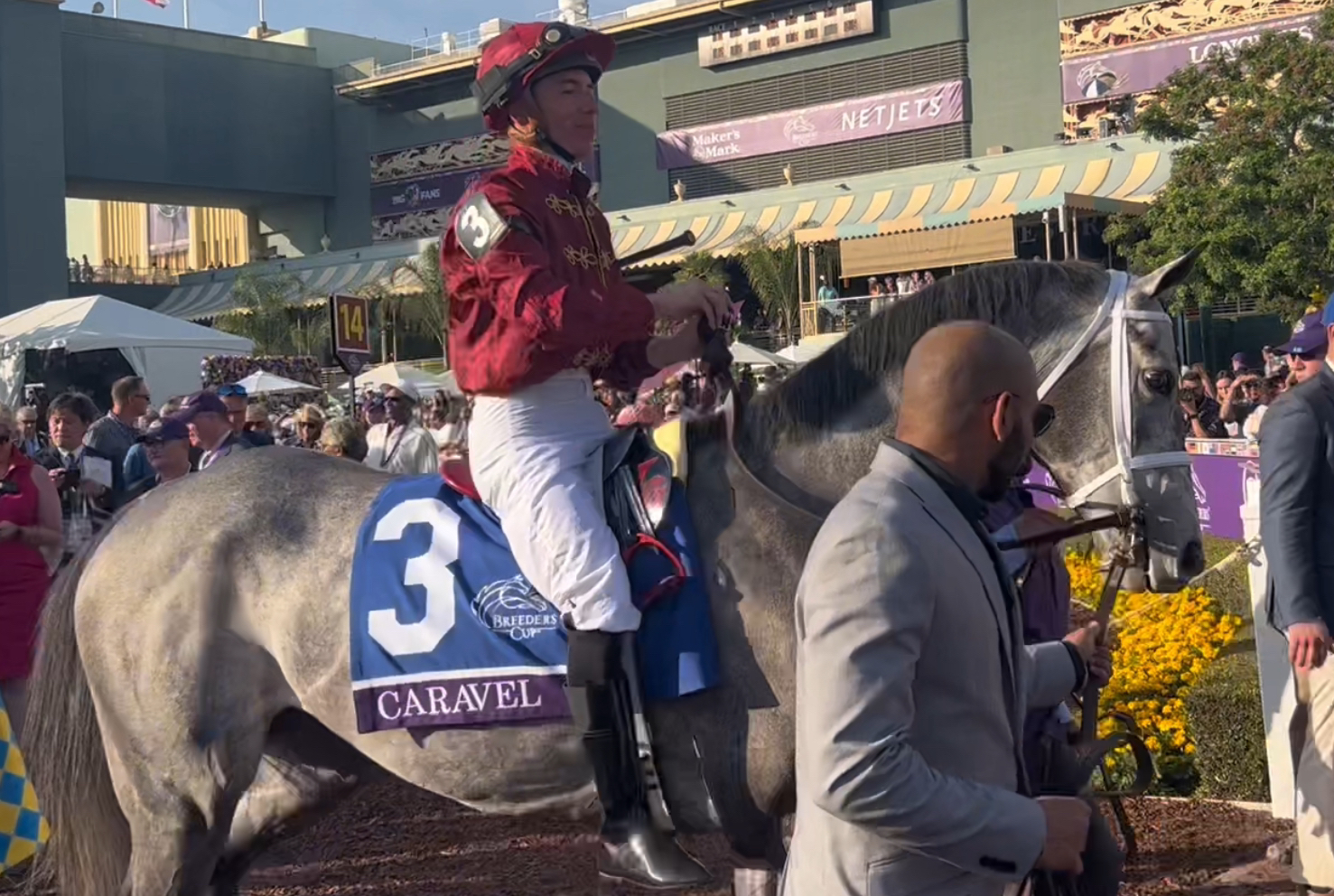
- Caravel right before the 2023 Breeders Cup Turf Sprint
- Sire: Mizzen Mast
- Grandsire: Cozzene
- Dam: Zeezee Zoomzoom
- Damsire: Congrats
- Sex: Mare
- Foaled: March 1, 2017 (age 9)
- Country: United States
- Colour: Gray or Roan
- Breeder: Elizabeth M. Merryman
- Owner: 1. Elizabeth M. Merryman (2017 – Jul 2021); 2. Elizabeth M. Merryman & Bobby Flay (Jul 2021 – Nov 2021); 3. Qatar Racing & Marc Detampel (Nov 2021 – Apr 2022); 4. Qatar Racing, Marc Detampel & Madaket Stables (Apr 2022 – Early 2024); 5. Resolute Bloodstock (Early 2024 – )
- Trainer: 1. Elizabeth M. Merryman (2017 – Jul 2021); 2. H. Graham Motion (Jul 2021 – Nov 2021); 3. Brad H. Cox (Nov 2021 – Dec 2023)
- Record: 26: 15–1–3
- Earnings: $1,983,327

Major wins
- Caress Stakes (2021); Intercontinental Stakes (2022); Franklin Stakes (2022); Shakertown Stakes (2023); Jaipur Stakes (2023); Breeders' Cup wins: Breeders' Cup Turf Sprint (2022)

Awards
- Pennsylvania Horse of the Year; Champion Three Year Old Filly (2020); Older Female, Female Sprinter and Turf Female (2023); Mid-Atlantic Thoroughbred/The Racing Biz Top Midlantic-bred Poll (2022)
- Last updated on 20 February 2024

Caravel (foaled March 1, 2017) is a retired American Thoroughbred racehorse. She won 15 races in her career, of which 13 were stakes races. Her top victories were in the Grade I Breeders' Cup Turf Sprint in 2022 and the Grade I Jaipur Stakes in 2023.

== Background ==
Caravel is a gray or roan mare who was home bred in Pennsylvania by Elizabeth Merryman. Caravel was sired by Mizzen Mast who stood at Juddmonte Farms and in 2021 was pensioned. He had sired twelve Grade/Group 1 winners. Her dam Zeezee Zoomzoom was by Congrats but her dam (Zee Zee) was by Exchange Rate. Zee Zee won the Edgewood Stakes and was graded stakes-placed (Lake George Stakes, Regret Stakes), ran in the Breeders' Cup (Monmouth Park in 2008). Zeezee Zoomzoom has produced another winner for Merryman, Tipsy Chatter. In 2023 Zeezee Zoomzoom was awarded the Pennsylvania Horse Breeders Association Broodmare of the Year.

Elizabeth Merryman consigned Caravel to the 2020 October Wanamaker Sale after her fourth start but did not reach her reserve price of $330,000.

=== Ownership and training ===
Merryman trained Caravel in her first eight starts. In July 2021, she sold 75% interest in the horse to Bobby Flay. Caravel won the Grade III Caress Stakes for the new partnership, and they then sent her to trainer H. Graham Motion.

After three starts, Caravel was sold for $500,000 at the Fasig-Tipton Kentucky Fall Mixed Sale in November 2021 at Keeneland to Qatar Racing, Marc Detampel, who transferred her to the barn of Brad H. Cox. Madaket Stables joined the partnership after one event later in April 2022.

== Career highlights ==
Caravel did not compete as a two-year-old. As a three-year-old, she was kept mostly in Pennsylvania, where she broke her maiden. She then won three more events, with her only defeat over a mile at Pimlico in the Hilltop Stakes.

As a four-year-old, Caravel opened her campaign in the Listed License Fee Stakes at Belmont Park. After leading, she weakened in the straight, finishing third to the French-bred She's My Type. Caravel then won three straight events, culminating with her first Graded stakes victory in the G3 Caress Stakes at Saratoga. After transferring to trainer H. Graham Motion following her Saratoga effort, she ran third at her first attempt in a Grade I event, the Highlander Stakes at Woodbine in Canada. She had two more starts in 2021, including a run in the Breeders' Cup Turf Sprint at Del Mar where she finished last in a field of twelve to Golden Pal. After the event, Caravel was auctioned.

In 2022, she began her five-year-old season with a victory for her new owners on the All-Weather track at Turfway Park in the Queen Stakes. Her other wins were in the Grade III Intercontinental Stakes at Belmont Park and the Grade III Franklin Stakes at Keeneland. Her connections then entered her in the Breeders' Cup Turf Sprint, which was held at the same track a few weeks later.

In the Turf Sprint, Caravel started as a 43/1 longshot. The race did not unfold as anticipated, with jockey Tyler Gaffalione expecting to be in a stalking position behind Golden Pal, but the heavy favorite was shuffling around right before the gates opened and was back in 14th at the break. Caravel quickly found herself in the lead and continued to fend off her opposition, winning by a half-length in 1:01.79.

As a six-year-old, Caravel continued her winning streak, defeating her male counterparts in the GIII Shakertown Stakes at Keeneland and winning her second Grade I event at Belmont Park in the Jaipur Stakes. Originally it was planned to send her to Royal Ascot, but connections decided to stay in the US. Her victory in the Jaipur earned her a paid berth in the Breeders' Cup Turf Sprint since the stakes was part of the Breeders' Cup "Win and You're In" program.

The 2023 Jaipur was Caravel's final win, as she finished fourth in the Troy Stakes and second in the Franklin Stakes before failing to defend her Breeders' Cup Turf Sprint title, finishing tenth in the 12-horse field. Following the Breeders' Cup, she was sent to the auction ring at the Keeneland November Breeding Stock Sale, where a final bid of $2.4 million was not enough to reach her reserve price. The following month, Caravel was retired; initially, Qatar Racing's Fergus Galvin said that she would be bred in 2024 to Triple Crown champion Justify. However, in February 2024 it was reported that Resolute Bloodstock owner John Stewart privately purchased Caravel, and the mare would be shipped to England to be bred to undefeated champion Frankel.

== Statistics ==
Date	Distance	Race	Grade	Track	Odds	Field	Finish	Winning Time	Winning (Losing) Margin	Jockey	Ref
2020 – three-year-old season
Jul 24, 2020	5 furlongs	Maiden Special Weight		Penn National	28.00	10	1	0:57.82	1 1/4 lengths	Inoel Beato	
Jul 29, 2020	5 furlongs	Allowance (Note: The allowance event was restricted to Pennsylvania bred thoroughbreds)		Penn National	2.80	9	1	0:54.66	5 1/4 lengths	Inoel Beato	
Aug 24, 2020	6 furlongs	Lake Erie Stakes		Presque Isle Downs	4.20	6	1	1:10.08	3 1/4 lengths	Pablo Morales	
Oct 3, 2020	1 mile	Hilltop Stakes		Pimlico	3.10	11	3	1:42.25	(3 lengths)	Paco Lopez	
Oct 22, 2020	6 1/2 furlongs	Malvern Rose Stakes	Restricted (Note: The Malvern Rose Stakes is restricted to Pennsylvania Bred thoroughbreds)	Presque Isle Downs	0.70*	6	1	1:15.40	4 3/4 lengths	Pablo Morales	
2021 – four-year-old season
Apr 30, 2021	6 furlongs	License Fee Stakes	Listed	Belmont Park	13.30	9	3	1:08.34	(2 1/2 lengths)	Nik Juarez	
May 14, 2021	5 furlongs	The Very One Stakes	Listed	Pimlico	2.30*	12	1	0:56.21	nose	Florent Geroux	
Jun 25, 2021	5 furlongs	Goldwood Stakes		Monmouth Park	1.90	8	1	0:54.97	4 1/4 lengths	Pablo Morales	
Jul 24, 2021	5 1/2 furlongs	Caress Stakes	III	Saratoga	1.00*	6	1	1:02.38	2 1/2 lengths	Irad Ortiz Jr.	
Aug 22, 2021	6 furlongs	Highlander Stakes	I	Woodbine	0.55*	8	3	1:07.98	(1 3/4 lengths)	Irad Ortiz Jr.	
Sep 26, 2021	5 furlongs	Turf Monster Stakes	III	Parx Racing	1.80*	9	5† (Note: In the Turf Monster Stakes, Caravel finished sixth in a dead heat with Caratori. The winner Hollywood Talent was later disqualified for a positive test and placed ninth. Subsequently Caravel was promoted to fifth place and earned equal fifth prizemoney of $8,200)	0:59.51	(4 1/4 lengths)	Jose L. Ortiz	
Nov 6, 2021	5 furlongs	Breeders' Cup Turf Sprint	I	Del Mar	17.40	12	12	0:55.22	(9 1/2 lengths)	Jose L. Ortiz	
2022 – five-year-old season
Mar 19, 2022	6 furlongs	Queen Stakes		Turfway Park	1.00*	7	1	1:09.56	3 1/2 lengths	Gerrado Corrales	
May 6, 2022	5 1/2 furlongs	Twin Spires Turf Sprint Stakes	II	Churchill Downs	3.00*	13	6	1:04.18	(3 1/4 lengths)	Tyler Gaffalione	
Jun 10, 2022	6 furlongs	Intercontinental Stakes	III	Belmont Park	2.95*	11	1	1:07.59	1 length	Tyler Gaffalione	
Jul 23, 2022	5 1/2 furlongs	Caress Stakes	III	Saratoga	2.20*	9	9	1:01.98	(8 1/2 lengths)	Tyler Gaffalione	
Aug 20, 2022	5 1/2 furlongs	Smart N Fancy Stakes	Listed	Saratoga	3.90	9	1	1:01.92	1/2 length	Luis Saez	
Sep 19, 2022	6 1/2 furlongs	Presque Isle Downs Masters Stakes	II	Presque Isle Downs	1.10*	11	4	1:14.57 (Note: The winner of Presque Isle Downs Masters Stakes, Artie's Princess set a track record of the 6 1/2–furlong distance)	(4 1/4 lengths)	Luis Saez	
Oct 16, 2022	5 1/2 furlongs	Franklin Stakes	III	Keeneland	2.44*	11	1	1:02.59	1 3/4 lengths	Tyler Gaffalione	
Nov 5, 2022	5 1/2 furlongs	Breeders' Cup Turf Sprint (Note: The Breeders' Cup Turf Sprint is an event without sex restriction. Caravel faced male horses)	I	Keeneland	42.89	14	1	1:01.79	1/2 length	Tyler Gaffalione	
2023 – six-year-old season
Apr 8, 2023	5 1/2 furlongs	Shakertown Stakes (Note: The Shakertown Stakes is an event without sex restriction. Caravel faced male horses)	II	Keeneland	2.15*	12	1	1:02.58	head	Tyler Gaffalione	
May 5, 2023	5 1/2 furlongs	Unbridled Sidney Stakes	Listed	Churchill Downs	0.74*	10	1	1:02.47	1 1/2 lengths	Tyler Gaffalione	
Jun 10, 2023	6 furlongs	Jaipur Stakes (Note: The Jaipur Stakes is an event without sex restriction. Caravel faced male horses)	I	Belmont Park	2.90*	14	1	1:07.83	3/4 length	Tyler Gaffalione	
Aug 5, 2023	5 1/2 furlongs	Troy Stakes (Note: The Troy Stakes is an event without sex restriction. Caravel faced male horses)	III	Saratoga	0.55*	7	4	1:03.70	(3 lengths)	Tyler Gaffalione	
Oct 15, 2023	5 1/2 furlongs	Franklin Stakes	II	Keeneland	0.72*	8	2	1:02.42	(neck)	Tyler Gaffalione	
Nov 4, 2023	5 furlongs	Breeders' Cup Turf Sprint	I	Santa Anita	4.60	12	10	0:55.15	(4 lengths)	Tyler Gaffalione	

Legend:
All Weather Track Dirt Turf
Notes:
An (*) asterisk after the odds means Caravel was the post-time favourite.

== Pedigree ==
Pedigree of Caravel, Gray or Roan Mare, March 1, 2017
Sire Mizzen Mast (1998)	Cozzene (1980)	Caro (IRE) (1967)	Fortino II (FR) (1959)
Sire Mizzen Mast (1998)	Cozzene (1980)	Caro (IRE) (1967)	Chambord (GB) (1955)
Sire Mizzen Mast (1998)	Cozzene (1980)	Ride the Trails (1971)	Prince John (1953)
Sire Mizzen Mast (1998)	Cozzene (1980)	Ride the Trails (1971)	Wildwook (1965)
Sire Mizzen Mast (1998)	Kinema (1983)	Graustark (1963)	Ribot (GB) (1964)
Sire Mizzen Mast (1998)	Kinema (1983)	Graustark (1963)	Flower Bowl (1965)
Sire Mizzen Mast (1998)	Kinema (1983)	Mrs. Peterkin (1965)	Tom Fool (1949)
Sire Mizzen Mast (1998)	Kinema (1983)	Mrs. Peterkin (1965)	Lagendra (1944)
Dam Zeezee Zoomzoom (2012)	Congrats (2000)	A.P. Indy (1989)	Seattle Slew (1974)
Dam Zeezee Zoomzoom (2012)	Congrats (2000)	A.P. Indy (1989)	Weekend Surprise (1980)
Dam Zeezee Zoomzoom (2012)	Congrats (2000)	Praise (1994)	Mr. Prospector (1970)
Dam Zeezee Zoomzoom (2012)	Congrats (2000)	Praise (1994)	Wild Applause (1981)
Dam Zeezee Zoomzoom (2012)	Zee Zee (2005)	Exchange Rate (1997)	Danzig (1977)
Dam Zeezee Zoomzoom (2012)	Zee Zee (2005)	Exchange Rate (1997)	Sterling Pound (1991)
Dam Zeezee Zoomzoom (2012)	Zee Zee (2005)	Emblem Of Hope (2000)	Dynaformer (1985)
Dam Zeezee Zoomzoom (2012)	Zee Zee (2005)	Emblem Of Hope (2000)	Touch of Honor (1993) (family 2b)
