= Shakertown Stakes =

- Class: Grade II
- Location: Keeneland Race Course; Lexington, Kentucky
- Inaugurated: 1995 (as Minstral Stakes)
- Race type: Thoroughbred – Flat racing
- Sponsor: Valvoline (2025)
- Website: www.keeneland.com

Race information
- Distance: 5 1/2 furlongs
- Surface: Turf
- Track: Left-handed
- Qualification: Three-year-olds & older
- Weight: Base weights with allowances: 4-year-olds and up: 126 lbs. 3-year-olds: 121 lbs.
- Purse: $400,000 (2025)

The Shakertown Stakes is a Grade III American thoroughbred horse race for horses age three and older over a distance of 5 1/2 furlongs on the turf held annually in early April at Keeneland Race Course in Lexington, Kentucky during the spring meeting. The event currently carries a purse of $400,000.

== History ==
The event was inaugurated as The Mistral Stakes on 18 October 1995 as a three-year-old-only race over a distance of 1 1/8 miles. The following year the event was not held but in 1997 was moved to the spring meeting and held at the current distance of 5 1/2 furlongs.

The event was renamed in 1998 to the Shakertown Stakes to honor Shakertown, a nearby Shaker community that is a United States National Historic Landmark, located about 25 miles from the racetrack.

The event was upgraded to a Grade III in 2003 and in 2016 to a Grade II.

In 2020 Lienster broke the course record held by Perfect Officer since 2012. The time was 1:00.86 for the 5 1/2 furlongs sprint.

== Records ==
Speed record

- 1:00.86 – Leinster (2020)

Margins

- 4 lengths – Bound for Nowhere (2018)

Most wins

- 2 – Soaring Free (2004, 2005)
- 2 – Bound for Nowhere (2018, 2021)

Most wins by an owner

- 2 – Sam-Son Farm (2004, 2005)
- 2 – Martin Racing Stable (2008, 2014)
- 2 – Wesley A. Ward (2018, 2021)

Most wins by a jockey

- 3 – Shane Sellers (1998, 1999, 2004)

Most wins by a trainer

- 4 – Wesley A. Ward (2016, 2018, 2021, 2022)

== Winners ==
Year	Winner	Age	Jockey	Trainer	Owner	Distance	Time	Purse	Grade	Ref
Shakertown Stakes
2026	My Boy Prince	5	Jose L. Ortiz	Mark E. Casse	Gary Barber	5 1/2 furlongs	1:02.11	$340,925	II	
2025	Think Big	4	Ben Curtis	Michael Stidham	Godolphin	5 1/2 furlongs	1:04.21	$376,563	II	
2024	Arzak	6	Irad Ortiz Jr.	Michael Trombetta	Sonata Stable	5 1/2 furlongs	1:02.93	$337,969	II	
2023	ƒ Caravel	6	Tyler Gaffalione	Brad H. Cox	Qatar Racing, Marc Detampel & Madaket Stables	5 1/2 furlongs	1:02.58	$350,000	II	
2022	Golden Pal	4	Irad Ortiz Jr.	Wesley A. Ward	Derrick Smith, Mrs. John Magnier, Michael Tabor & Westerberg	5 1/2 furlongs	1:02.21	$317,657	II	
2021	Bound for Nowhere	7	Joel Rosario	Wesley A. Ward	Wesley A. Ward	5 1/2 furlongs	1:02.19	$200,000	II	
2020	Leinster	5	Tyler Gaffalione	George R Arnold II	Amy E Dunne, Westrock Stables Et Al	5 1/2 furlongs	1:00.86	$150,000	II	
2019	Imprimis	4	Paco Lopez	Joe Orseno	Breeze Easy	5 1/2 furlongs	1:02.33	$200,000	II	
2018	Bound for Nowhere	4	Julio A. Garcia	Wesley A. Ward	Wesley A. Ward	5 1/2 furlongs	1:03.77	$200,000	II	
2017	Holding Gold	4	Joel Rosario	Mark E. Casse	Live Oak Plantation	5 1/2 furlongs	1:02.29	$200,000	II	
2016	Undrafted	6	Joe Bravo	Wesley A. Ward	Wes Welker & Sol Kumin	5 1/2 furlongs	1:02.96	$200,000	II	
2015	Something Extra	7	Shaun Bridgmohan	Gail Cox	John Menary & Gail Cox	5 1/2 furlongs	1:02.85	$125,000	III	
2014	Marchman	4	Robby Albarado	W. Bret Calhoun	Martin Racing Stable	5 1/2 furlongs	1:02.36	$100,000	III	
2013	Havelock	6	Garrett K. Gomez	Darrin Miller	Silverton Hill	5 1/2 furlongs	1:03.02	$100,000	III	
2012	Perfect Officer	6	Javier Castellano	Anthony W. Dutrow	David A. Ross Racing Stable	5 1/2 furlongs	1:01.53	$100,000	III	
2011	Stratford Hill	4	John R. Velazquez	Todd A. Pletcher	Melnyk Racing Stable	5 1/2 furlongs	1:03.90	$100,000	III	
2010	Silver Timber	7	Julien R. Leparoux	Chad C. Brown	Michael Dubb & High Grade Racing Stable	5 1/2 furlongs	1:01.87	$100,000	III	
2009	Heros Reward	7	Javier Castellano	Dale Capuano	Rob Ry Farm & Jayne Marie Slysz	5 1/2 furlongs	1:04.24	$100,000	III	
2008	Mr. Nightlinger	4	Jamie Theriot	W. Bret Calhoun	Martin Racing Stable & Carl R. Moore Management	5 1/2 furlongs	1:03.84	$125,000	III	
2007	The Nth Degree	6	Eddie Castro	Eduardo Caramori	Rodney J. Winkler	5 1/2 furlongs	1:03.94	$110,200	III	
2006	Atticus Kristy	5	Garrett K. Gomez	Merrill R. Scherer	Centaur Farms & Daniel Lynch	5 1/2 furlongs	1:01.83	$115,000	III	
2005	Soaring Free	6	Jerry D. Bailey	Mark R. Frostad	Sam-Son Farm	5 1/2 furlongs	1:02.22	$113,300	III	
2004	Soaring Free	5	Shane Sellers	Mark R. Frostad	Sam-Son Farm	5 1/2 furlongs	1:01.78	$115,100	III	
2003	No Jacket Required	6	Brice Blanc	Thomas M. Amoss	W. Temple Webber Jr.	5 1/2 furlongs	1:03.25	$113,700	III	
2002	§ Morluc	6	Robby Albarado	Randy L. Morse	Michael P. Cloonan	5 1/2 furlongs	1:03.25	$85,050	Listed	
2001	Airbourne Command	6	Jorge F. Chavez	Richard Saland	Richard Saland	5 1/2 furlongs	1:02.71	$85,200	Listed	
2000	Bold Fact	5	Richard Migliore	John C. Kimmel	Juddmonte Farms	5 1/2 furlongs	1:02.60	$74,500	Listed	
1999	Prankster	6	Shane Sellers	Thomas M. Amoss	Karnak Galactic Racing	5 1/2 furlongs	1:02.60	$67,000	Listed	
1998	Sesaro	6	Shane Sellers	Charles LoPresti	Henryk de Kwiatkowski	5 1/2 furlongs	1:02.20	$66,250	Listed	
Minstral Stakes
1997	G.H.'s Pleasure	5	José A. Santos	Kenneth E. Hoffman	Tony Canonie Sr. & Jr. & Kenneth E. Hoffman	5 1/2 furlongs	1:03.00	$59,250	Listed	
1996	Race not held									
1995	Cinch	3	Randy Romero	Carl Nafzger	Jim Tafel	1 1/8 miles	1:47.69	$58,358	Listed	

Notes:
§ Ran as part of an entry
ƒ Filly or Mare

== See also ==
- List of American and Canadian Graded races
