= Idiomatic (horse) =

American-bred Thoroughbred racehorse

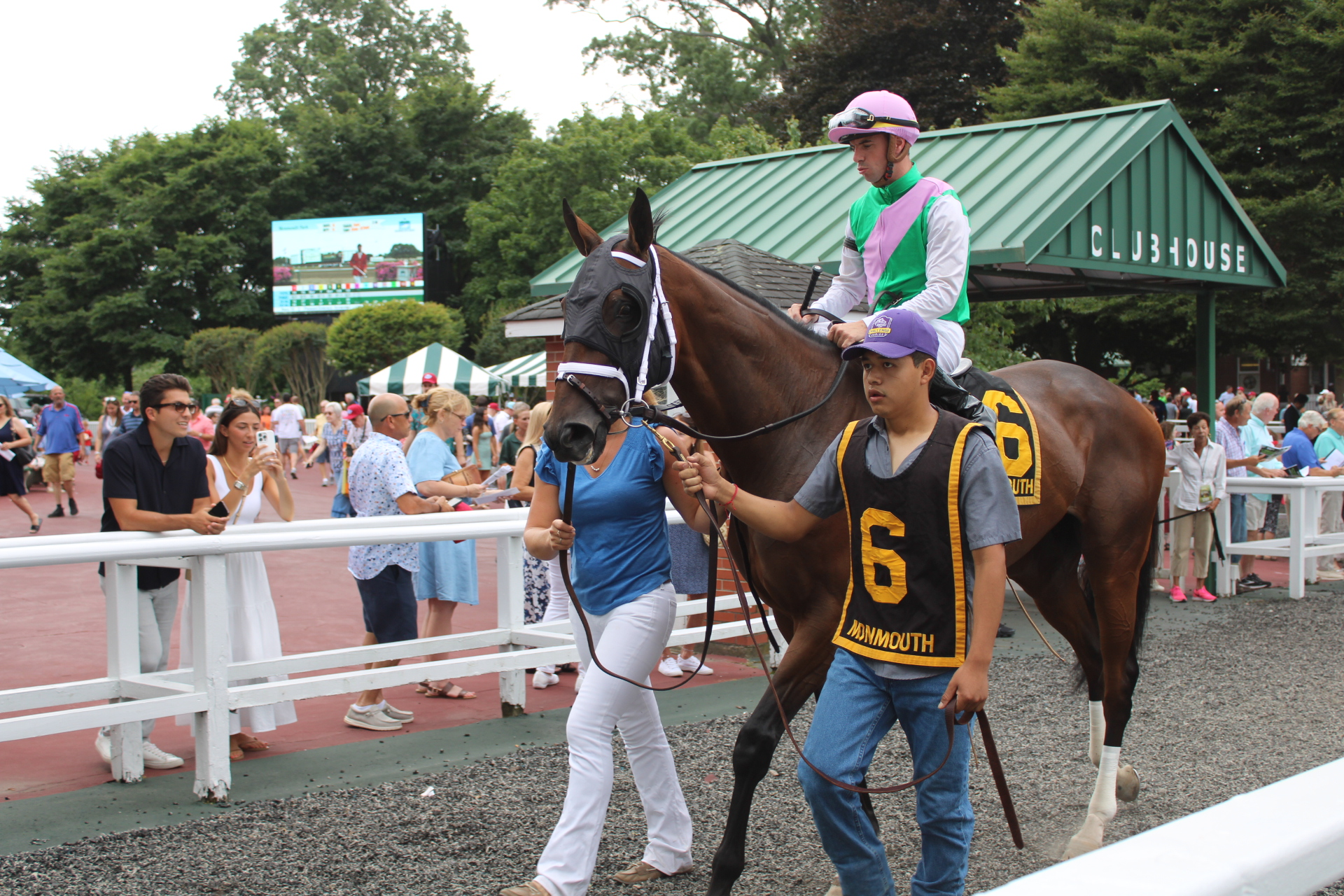
- Sire: Curlin
- Grandsire: Smart Strike
- Dam: Lockdown
- Damsire: First Defense
- Sex: Mare
- Foaled: January 27, 2019 (age 6)
- Country: United States
- Color: Bay
- Breeder: Juddmonte Farms
- Owner: Juddmonte Farms
- Trainer: Brad H. Cox
- Record: 17: 12 – 3 – 2
- Earnings: $3,944,190

Major wins
- Shawnee Stakes (2023); Delaware Handicap (2023); Personal Ensign Stakes (2023); Spinster Stakes (2023, 2024); La Troienne Stakes (2024); Molly Pitcher Stakes (2024); Breeders' Cup wins: Breeders' Cup Distaff (2023)

Awards
- American Champion Older Dirt Female Horse (2023)
- Last updated on October 8, 2024

Idiomatic (foaled January 27, 2019) is a retired Champion American thoroughbred racehorse who has won multiple Grade I events in 2023, including the Personal Ensign Stakes at Saratoga Race Course, Spinster Stakes at Keeneland and Breeders' Cup Distaff at Santa Anita Park.

== Background ==
Idiomatic is a bay mare that was bred in Kentucky by Fahad bin Khalid's Juddmonte Farms. Juddmonte Farms continues to own the horse. Her sire is Curlin, the 2007 and 2008 American Horse of the Year who stands at Hill 'n' Dale Farms in Kentucky. Her dam is Lockwood, a full sister to 2014 US Champion Older Female Horse and multiple Grade 1 winner Close Hatches. Lockdown finished third in the 2017 G1 Kentucky Oaks and also has an unraced three-year-old Medaglia d'Oro filly and an Into Mischief yearling filly. Lockwood's top win was in the 2017 Busanda Stakes at Aqueduct Racetrack. She died in 2022.

Juddmonte Farms' involvement in Idiomatic's lineage is through the horse Monroe, a group 3 winner and group 1-placed runner by Sir Ivor out of the mare Best in Show.

The dam's sire, First Defence, was a Juddmonte Farm's homegrown Grade I Forego Handicap winner who stood at Juddmonte during 2009-16 and then was sold to Haif Stud in Saudi Arabia in 2016.

Idiomatic is trained by Brad H. Cox.

After a successful four-year-old campaign, Idiomatic was awarded Eclipse Award as the U.S. Champion Older Dirt Female Horse for 2023.

During preparations for the 2024 Breeders' Cup, Idiomatic was found to be lame, and an issue that should heal readily was identified in her left knee. Her owners decided to retire her to be a broodmare.

== Statistics ==
Date	Distance	Race	Grade	Track	Odds	Field	Finish	Winning Time	Winning (Losing) Margin	Jockey	Ref
2022 – Three-year-old season
Apr 3, 2022	1 mile	Maiden Special Weight		Turfway Park	2.50	12	1	1:37.52	3 lengths	Manuel Franco	
May 6, 2022	1 1/16 miles	Allowance Optional Claiming		Churchill Downs	2.10*	8	3	1:42.89	(2 lengths)	Manuel Franco	
Dec 7, 2022	1 1/16 miles	Allowance Optional Claiming		Turfway Park	0.92*	12	3	1:43.88	(1 1/4 lengths)	Joseph Talamo	
2023 – Four-year-old season
Jan 4, 2023	1 1/4 miles	Allowance Optional Claiming		Turfway Park	1.75	7	1	2:04.89	6 1/4 lengths	Chris Landeros	
Feb 16, 2023	1 mile	Allowance Optional Claiming		Turfway Park	0.84*	10	1	1:36.40	1 1/2 lengths	Chris Landeros	
Mar 25, 2023	1 1/16 miles	Latonia Stakes		Turfway Park	2.53*	9	1	1:44.50	2 lengths	Chris Landeros	
May 26, 2023	1 mile	Ruffian Stakes	II	Belmont Park	1.95	6	2	1:36.13	(5 1/2 lengths)	Trevor McCarthy	
Jun 3, 2023	1 1/16 miles	Shawnee Stakes	III	Churchill Downs	2.20*	7	1	1:42.13	2 1/2 lengths	Florent Geroux	
Jul 8, 2023	1 3/16 miles	Delaware Handicap	II	Delaware Park	0.40*	6	1	1:50.72	head	Florent Geroux	
Aug 25, 2023	1 1/8 miles	Personal Ensign Stakes	I	Saratoga	4.00	6	1	1:49.12	4 lengths	Florent Geroux	
Oct 8, 2023	1 1/8 miles	Spinster Stakes	I	Keeneland	1.06	6	1	1:49.82	4 1/4 lengths	Florent Geroux	
Nov 5, 2023	1 1/8 miles	Breeders' Cup Distaff	I	Santa Anita	1.80*	9	1	1:50.57	1/2 length	Florent Geroux	
2024 – Five-year-old season
May 3, 2024	1 1/16 miles	La Troienne Stakes	I	Churchill Downs	0.83*	5	1	1:43.24	3 3/4 lengths	Florent Geroux	
Jun 8, 2024	1 1/8 miles	Ogden Phipps Stakes	I	Saratoga	0.70*	6	2	1:49.58	(head)	Florent Geroux	
Jul 20, 2024	1 1/16 miles	Molly Pitcher Stakes	III	Monmouth Park	0.10*	5	1	1:44.53	head	Florent Geroux	
Aug 23, 2024	1 1/8 miles	Personal Ensign Stakes	I	Saratoga	0.80*	5	2	1:49.14	(head)	Florent Geroux	
Oct 6, 2024	1 1/8 miles	Spinster Stakes	I	Keeneland	0.32*	6	1	1:49.04	6 1/2 lengths	Florent Geroux	

Legend:
All Weather Track
Dirt
Notes: An (*) asterisk after the odds means Idiomatic was the post-time favorite.

== Pedigree ==
Pedigree of Idiomatic, bay filly, January 27, 2019
Sire Curlin (2004)	Smart Strike (CAN) (1992)	Mr. Prospector (1970)	Raise A Native (1961)
Sire Curlin (2004)	Smart Strike (CAN) (1992)	Mr. Prospector (1970)	Gold Digger (1962)
Sire Curlin (2004)	Smart Strike (CAN) (1992)	Classy 'n Smart (1981)	Smarten (1976)
Sire Curlin (2004)	Smart Strike (CAN) (1992)	Classy 'n Smart (1981)	No Class (CAN) (1974)
Sire Curlin (2004)	Sherriff's Deputy (1994)	Deputy Minister (CAN) (1979)	Vice Regent (CAN) (1967)
Sire Curlin (2004)	Sherriff's Deputy (1994)	Deputy Minister (CAN) (1979)	Mint Copy (CAN) (1970)
Sire Curlin (2004)	Sherriff's Deputy (1994)	Barbarika (1985)	Bates Motel (1979)
Sire Curlin (2004)	Sherriff's Deputy (1994)	Barbarika (1985)	War Exchange(1972)
Dam Lockdown (2014)	First Defense (2004)	Unbridled's Song (1993)	Unbridled (1987)
Dam Lockdown (2014)	First Defense (2004)	Unbridled's Song (1993)	Trolley Song (1983)
Dam Lockdown (2014)	First Defense (2004)	Honest Lady (1996)	Seattle Slew (1974)
Dam Lockdown (2014)	First Defense (2004)	Honest Lady (1996)	Toussaud (1989)
Dam Lockdown (2014)	Rising Tornado (2005)	Storm Cat (1983)	Storm Bird (CAN) (1978)
Dam Lockdown (2014)	Rising Tornado (2005)	Storm Cat (1983)	Terlingua (1976)
Dam Lockdown (2014)	Rising Tornado (2005)	Silver Star (1996)	Zafonic (1990)
Dam Lockdown (2014)	Rising Tornado (2005)	Silver Star (1996)	Monroe (1977) (family 8f)
