= Franklin Stakes =

- Class: Grade II
- Location: Keeneland Race Course, Lexington, Kentucky United States
- Inaugurated: 1997 (as A. P. Indy Stakes)
- Race type: Thoroughbred - Flat racing - Turf
- Website: www.keeneland.com

Race information
- Distance: 5 1/2 furlongs
- Surface: Turf
- Track: Left-handed
- Qualification: Fillies and Mares, three years old and older
- Weight: Base weight with allowances: 4-year-olds and up: 124 lbs. 3-year-olds: 122 lbs.
- Purse: $400,000 (since 2025)

The Franklin Stakes is a Grade II American Thoroughbred horse race for fillies and mares that are three years old or older, over a distance of 5 1/2 furlongs on the turf held annually in October at Keeneland Race Course, Lexington, Kentucky during the autumn meeting. The event currently carries a purse of $400,000.

== History ==
The event is named in honor of Franklin County which is adjacent to Keeneland Race Course.

The race was inaugurated on 18 October 1997 as the A. P. Indy Stakes in honor of the 1992 American Horse of the Year A.P. Indy. The inaugural event was run in split divisions.

In 2003 the event was renamed to the Clark County Stakes, a Kentucky county adjacent to Lexington.

In 2005 the event was renamed to the Franklin County Stakes. The 2006 running was moved to the All Weather Track. In 2016 the event was upgraded to a Grade III

The name of the event was modified in 2022 to the Franklin Stakes.

In 2023 the American Graded Stakes Committee upgraded the event to Grade II status.

== Records ==
Speed record:

- 5 1/2 furlongs: 1:01.47 – Future Is Now (2024)

Margins:

- 5 1/2 lengths: Affair With Aflair (1997)

Most wins

- 2 – Ayrial Delight (1998, 1999)
- 2 - Time to Dazzle (2025, 2026)

Most wins by a jockey

- 3 – Joel Rosario (2014, 2016, 2019)
- 3 – Pat Day (1998, 2000, 2004)

Most wins by a trainer

- 3 - Mark E. Casse (2020, 2025, 2026)

Most wins by an owner

- 2 – Dwight M. Mentzer (1998, 1999)
- 2 - Tracy Farmer (2025, 2026)

== Winners ==
Year	Winner	Age	Jockey	Trainer	Owner	Distance	Time	Purse	Grade	Ref
Franklin Stakes
2026	Time to Dazzle	5	Irad Ortiz Jr.	Mark E. Casse	Tracy Farmer	5 1/2 furlongs	1:04.52	$400,000	II	
2025	Time to Dazzle	4	José Ortiz	Mark E. Casse	Tracy Farmer	5 1/2 furlongs	1:02.09	$390,950	II	
2024	Future Is Now	4	Paco Lopez	Michael J. Trombetta	R. Larry Johnson	5 1/2 furlongs	1:01.47	$303,244	II	
2023	Tony Ann	5	Flavien Prat	Philip D'Amato	Anthony Fanticola & A Venneri Racing	5 1/2 furlongs	1:02.42	$336,525	II	
2022	Caravel	5	Tyler Gaffalione	Brad H. Cox	Qatar Racing, Marc Detampel & Madaket Stables	5 1/2 furlongs	1:02.59	$263,000	III	
Franklin County Stakes
2021	Change of Control	5	Colby Hernandez	Michelle Lovell	Perry Harrison	5 1/2 furlongs	1:05.89	$149,400	III	
2020	Got Stormy	5	Tyler Gaffalione	Mark E. Casse	Gary Barber	5 1/2 furlongs	1:02.33	$150,000	III	
2019	Oleksandra (AUS)	5	Joel Rosario	Neil D. Drysdale	Team Valor International	5 1/2 furlongs	1:01.79	$150,000	III	
2018	Chanteline	6	Ricardo Santana Jr.	Steven M. Asmussen	Ten Broeck Farm	5 1/2 furlongs	1:02.89	$100,000	III	
2017	Morticia	3	Jose Lezcano	George R. Arnold II	G. Watts Humphrey Jr.	5 1/2 furlongs	1:03.92	$100,000	III	
2016	Miss Ella	4	Joel Rosario	H. Graham Motion	Jack Swain III	5 1/2 furlongs	1:04.52	$100,000	III	
2015	Ageless	6	Julien R. Leparoux	Arnaud Delacour	Lael Stables	5 1/2 furlongs	1:03.66	$100,000	Listed	
2014	Free as a Bird	5	Joel Rosario	Ian R. Wilkes	Elizabeth J. Valando	5 1/2 furlongs	1:03.60	$100,000	Listed	
2013	Queen's Award	6	Kent J. Desormeaux	Eduardo Caramori	Jessica Coudelaria	5 1/2 furlongs	1:03.12	$100,000	Listed	
2012	Madame Giry	3	Eddie Castro	Cam Gambolati	Nutmeg Stables	5 1/2 furlongs	1:03.12	$100,000	Listed	
2011	Wild About Marie	4	Robby Albarado	Jeffrey D. Thornbury	Ike Thrash & Dawn Thrash	5 1/2 furlongs	1:03.01	$100,000	Listed	
2010	Mimi's Bling	3	Julien R. Leparoux	Eddie Kenneally	Eddie Kenneally & Pete Kirwan	5 1/2 furlongs	1:03.48	$100,000	Listed	
2009	Dubai Majesty	4	Jamie Theriot	W. Bret Calhoun	Martin Racing Stable & Dan Morgan	5 1/2 furlongs	1:03.64	$116,700	Listed	
2008	Sly Storm	3	Jamie Theriot	Thomas F. Proctor	Glen Hill Farm	5 1/2 furlongs	1:03.60	$112,200	Listed	
2007	Stylish Wildcat	4	Garrett K. Gomez	John W. Sadler	C R K Stable	5 1/2 furlongs	1:03.71	$114,700	Listed	
2006	Society Hostess	4	Garrett K. Gomez	Christophe Clement	Moyglare Stud Farm	6 furlongs	1:09.59	$113,100	Listed	Off turf
2005	Bright Gold	5	Horacio Karamanos	Mary E. Eppler	Hazel B. Marsh	5 1/2 furlongs	1:02.53	$113,300	Listed	
Clark County Stakes
2004	Dyna Da Wyna	4	Pat Day	W. Elliott Walden	WinStar Farm	5 1/2 furlongs	1:03.32	$84,450	Listed	
2003	On the Fritz	5	Robby Albarado	James E. Baker	Woodlynn Farm	5 1/2 furlongs	1:02.92	$85,425	Listed	
A.P. Indy Stakes
2002	Dixie Tactics	4	Edgar S. Prado	Morris G. Nicks	Don Eberts	5 1/2 furlongs	1:03.47	$85,650	Listed	
2001	Confessional	5	Ramon A. Dominguez	H. Graham Motion	Pin Oak Stable	5 1/2 furlongs	1:04.06	$83,100	Listed	
2000	Chris's Thunder	5	Pat Day	Kelly L. Broussard	Michael Schwartz	5 1/2 furlongs	1:01.72	$81,900	Listed	
1999	Ayrial Delight	7	Marlon St. Julien	Ronald James Taylor	Dwight M. Mentzer	5 1/2 furlongs	1:03.57	$65,163	Listed	
1998	Ayrial Delight	6	Randy Romero	Ronald James Taylor	Dwight M. Mentzer	5 1/2 furlongs	1:03.97	$60,450	Listed	Division 1
1998	Song of Africa	5	Pat Day	John C. Kimmel	Ronald E. Mager	5 1/2 furlongs	1:03.48	$59,600	Listed	Division 2
1997	Affair With Aflair	3	Willie Martinez	Richard J. Lundy	Simi Racing Stable	5 1/2 furlongs	1:04.98	$66,350	Listed	Division 1
1997	Mariuka	4	Donna M. Barton	Charles LoPresti	Calumet Farm	5 1/2 furlongs	1:04.30	$65,700	Listed	Division 2

Legend:
Turf All Weather Track

== See also ==
- List of American and Canadian Graded races
