= Intercontinental Stakes =

- Class: Grade II
- Location: Belmont Park; Elmont, New York, United States
- Inaugurated: 2014
- Race type: Thoroughbred - Flat racing - Inner Turf
- Sponsor: MTV Solutions (2024)
- Website: NYRA

Race information
- Distance: 6 furlongs
- Surface: Turf
- Track: Left-handed
- Qualification: Fillies and Mares, four years old and older
- Weight: 124 lbs with allowances
- Purse: $200,000 (2021)

The Intercontinental Stakes is a Grade II American Thoroughbred horse race for fillies and mares aged four years old and older, over a distance of six furlongs on the turf held annually in early June at Belmont Park in Elmont, New York. The event currently carries a purse of $200,000.

== History ==
The race was inaugurated in 2014 with a stakes purse of $100,000.

The event is held on the Thursday before the Belmont Stakes as part of the Belmont Racing Festival.

In 2017 the event was classified as Grade III.

The race is named after American Champion Female Turf Horse for 2005 Intercontinental who in that year won the Breeders' Cup Filly & Mare Turf.

In 2022 the distance of the event was decreased from seven furlongs to six furlongs.

In 2024 the event was upgraded by the Thoroughbred Owners and Breeders Association to Grade II status. Also the event was moved to Saratoga Racetrack due to infield tunnel and redevelopment work at Belmont Park and the distance of the event was decreased to 5 1/2 furlongs.

== Records ==
Speed record:

- 6 furlongs: 1:07.59 - Caravel (2022)
- 7 furlongs: 1:19.83 - Significant Form (2019)

Largest margin of victory:

- 3 1/2 lengths - Zindaya (2015)

Most wins:

- 2 – Zindaya (2015, 2016)

Most wins by a jockey:

- 3 – Irad Ortiz Jr. (2019, 2020, 2026)

Most wins by a trainer:

- 3 – Chad C. Brown (2016, 2019, 2020)

Most wins by an owner:

- 2 - Madaket Stables (2022, 2026)

== Winners ==
Year	Winner	Age	Jockey	Trainer	Owner	Distance	Time	Purse	Grade	Ref
At Saratoga
2026	Roja	4	Irad Ortiz Jr.	H. Graham Motion	Eclipse Thoroughbred Partners & Madaket Stables	5 1/2 furlongs	1:00.44	$250,000	II	
2025	Pipsy (IRE)	4	José Ortiz	William Walden	Woodford Thoroughbreds LLC	5 1/2 furlongs	1:00.98	$200,000	II	
2024	Future Is Now	4	Paco Lopez	Michael Trombetta	R. Larry Johnson	5 1/2 furlongs	1:01.35	$200,000	II	
At Belmont Park
2023	Poppy Flower	4	José Ortiz	William Mott	Arnmore Thoroughbreds	6 furlongs	1:08.53	$200,000	III	
2022	Caravel	5	Tyler Gaffalione	Brad H. Cox	Qatar Racing, Madaket Stables, & Marc Detampel	6 furlongs	1:07.59	$200,000	III	
2021	Change of Control	5	Colby J. Hernandez	Michelle Lovell	Perry Harrison	7 furlongs	1:22.07	$194,000	III	
2020	Newspaperofrecord (IRE)	4	Irad Ortiz Jr.	Chad C. Brown	Klaravich Stables	7 furlongs	1:22.71	$100,000	III	
2019	Significant Form	4	Irad Ortiz Jr.	Chad C. Brown	Stephanie Seymour Brant	7 furlongs	1:19.83	$200,000	III	
2018	La Sardane (FR)	4	Flavien Prat	Neil D. Drysdale	Team Valor International	7 furlongs	1:20.04	$200,000	III	
2017	Mississippi Delta	5	Jose Lezcano	Mark E. Casse	Mike Rutherford & Terry Green	7 furlongs	1:20.05	$250,000	III	
2016	Zindaya	5	Javier Castellano	Chad C. Brown	e Five Racing Thoroughbreds	7 furlongs	1:22.44	$150,000	Listed	
2015	Zindaya	4	Manuel Franco	Christophe Clement	Regis Racing	7 furlongs	1:22.17	$150,000		
2014	Free as a Bird	5	Joel Rosario	Ian R. Wilkes	Elizabeth J. Valando	7 furlongs	1:20.52	$100,000		

== See also ==
- List of American and Canadian Graded races
