= Pasco Stakes =

- Class: Listed stakes
- Location: Tampa Bay Downs; Westchase, Florida.
- Inaugurated: 1999
- Race type: Thoroughbred - Flat racing
- Website: www.tampabaydowns.com

Race information
- Distance: 7 furlongs
- Surface: Dirt
- Track: left-handed
- Qualification: Three-years-old
- Weight: Assigned
- Purse: $125,000 (2018)

The Pasco Stakes is a horse race for three-year-old Thoroughbreds run annually since 1999 at Tampa Bay Downs in Westchase, Florida. A Listed race offering a purse of $125,000, it is run on dirt over a distance of 7 furlongs.

== Records ==
Speed record:

- At 7 furlongs : 1:20.89 by Win Win Win in 2019

Most wins by a jockey:

- 3 - Daniel Centeno (2010, 2015, 2016)

Most wins by a trainer:

- 2 - Mark Casse (2012, 2013)

Most wins by an owner:

- 2 - John C. Oxley (2012, 2013)

== Winners ==
Year	Winner	Jockey	Trainer	Owner	Dist. (Furlongs)	Time	Purse$
2025	Naughty Rascal	Edwin Gonzalez	Gerald S. Bennett	Mr Pug LLC and J.P.G. 2 LLC	7 F	1:22.50	$150,000
2024	Book'em Danno	Samuel Marin	Derek S. Ryan	Atlantic Six Racing, LLC	7 F	1:23.26	$125,000
2023	Zydeceaux	Samuel Marin	Ramon Minguet	Stud Carmen Christina	7 F	1:24.64	$125,000
2020	Liam's Lucky Charm	Edgar Zayas	Ralph Nicks	Stonehedge LLC	7 F	1:21.75	$125,000
2019	Win Win Win	Julian Pimentel	Michael Trombetta	Live Oak Plantation	7 F	1:20.89	$125,000
2018	World of Trouble	Antonio A. Gallardo	Jason Servis	Michael Dubb	7 F	1:21.52	$125,000
2017	The Money Monster	Edgard Zayas	Rohan Crichton	Crichton & Baker	7 F	1:24.04	$100,000
2016	Morning Fire	Daniel Centeno	Keith Nations	Mercedes Stable	7 F	1:24.76	$100,000
2015	Catalina Red	Daniel Centeno	Chad J. Stewart	Anthony A. Lenci	7 F	1:21.40	$100,000
2014	Mighty Brown	Dean Butler	Timothy A. Ice	Tri-StarRacing & TheFarmOn4, LLC	7 F	1:24.17	$100,000
2013	Dynamic Sky	Luis Contreras	Mark Casse	John C. Oxley	7 F	1:22.79	$100,000
2012	Prospective	Luis Contreras	Mark Casse	John C. Oxley	7 F	1:23.88	$100,000
2011	Manicero	Luis Saez	Leo Azpurua Jr.	Leo Azpurua Sr.	7 F	1:24.58	$75,000
2010	Uptowncharlybrown	Daniel Centeno	Alan S. Seewald	Fantasy Lane Stables	7 F	1:24.28	$75,000
2009	Musket Man	Luis Gonzalez	Derek Ryan	Eric Fein & Vic Carlson	7 F	1:25.63	$75,000
2008	Honey Honey Honey	Jose Lopez	Stanley I. Gold	Jacks or Better Farm, Inc.	7 F	1:24.75	$75,000
2007	Barkley Sound	Enrique Jurado	Joan S. Scott	Pinebloom Stables	7 F	1:24.31	$75,000
2006	R Loyal Man	Manoel Cruz	Timothy S. Ritvo	Alfred Kowalewski	7 F	1:22.55	$75,000
2005	Electric Light	Winston Thompson	Nicholas P. Zito	Live Oak Plantation	7 F	1:23.67	$50,000
2004	Misguided Left	Jesus Castanon	J. David Braddy	Joel W. Sainer	7 F	1:25.94	$50,000
2003	Super Fuse	Carlos Gonzalez	Richard J. Ciardullo Jr.	C. T. Stable, LLC	7 F	1:25.07	$50,000
2002	Major Focus	Earlie Fires	Thomas F. Proctor	Glen Hill Farm	7 F	1:24.53	$50,000
2001	One Special Judge	Sidney LeJeune Jr.	Ronald E. Moquett	Peppertree Farm	7 F	1:25.31	$50,000
2000	Bearcat Ruckus	Derek Bell	Javier N. Contreras	Teaberry Acres	7 F	1:24.87	$40,000
1999	Slew the Message	Terry D. Houghton	Jason J. Stodghill	Chris Powell	7 F	1:24.51	$25,000
