= Aventura Stakes =

The Aventura Stakes is a race for Thoroughbred horses raced at Gulfstream Park once run at the start of the year, but now in December. The Aventura is open to three-year-olds willing to race one mile on the dirt and carries a purse of $125,000.

It is a prep to the Kentucky Derby the Holy Bull Stakes, the Hutcheson Stakes, the Fountain of Youth Stakes and the Florida Derby.

The Aventura is not listed as running in 2009 at Gulfstream Park.

== Past winners ==
- 2014 - Atreides (1:37.20)
- 2008 - Not Run?
- 2007 - Street Magician (Rafael Bejarano)
- 2006 - Doctor Decherd (Shaun Bridgmohan)
- 2005 - High Fly
- 2004 - Kaufy Mate
- 2003 - Dynever
- 2002 - Marasca
