= Caress Stakes =

Horse race in New York, United States

- Class: Grade II
- Location: Saratoga Race Course; Saratoga Springs, New York, United States
- Inaugurated: 2008 (at Belmont Park)
- Website: NYRA

Race information
- Distance: 5 1/2 furlongs
- Surface: Turf
- Track: Left-handed
- Qualification: Filles and mares, four-year-olds and older
- Weight: 126 lbs with allowances
- Purse: US$250,000 (since 2026)

The Caress Stakes is a Grade II American Thoroughbred horse race for fillies and mares aged four years old and older held over a distance of five and one-half furlongs on the turf held annually in July at Saratoga Race Course in Saratoga Springs, New York.

== History ==
The event is named in honor of mare Caress who won the 1995 Grade III Poker Stakes at Belmont Park defeating male horses and also won the Grade III Beaugay Handicap at Aqueduct Racetrack.

The event's inaugural running was on 25 June 2008 at Belmont Park in Elmont, New York as the third race on the race card over the seven furlong distance for fillies and mares aged three years old and older and was won by the Stormy West who was ridden by the US Hall of Fame jockey Kent Desormeaux and trained by US Hall of Fame trainer Bill Mott in a blanket photo finish by a head in a time of 1:21.29.

In 2009 and 2011 the event was run over a shorter distance of six furlongs. The event was not held in 2010.

In 2012 the event was scheduled in August at Saratoga over the sprint distance of 5 1/2 furlongs.

In 2016 the event was moved off the turf due to rain affected track and held on a sealed sloppy dirt track.

In 2021 the event was upgraded in classification by the Thoroughbred Owners and Breeders Association's American Graded Stakes Committee to Grade III. The event would be upgraded again to Grade II for 2026.

== Records ==
Speed record:

- 5 1/2 furlongs: 1:00.82 Thieves Guild (2015)

Margins:

- 2 1/2 lengths – Miss Ella (2016)

Most wins:

- 2 – Miss Ella (2016, 2017)

Most wins by an owner:

- 2 – Jack Swain III (2016, 2017)

Most wins by a jockey:

- 4 – Irad Ortiz Jr. (2020, 2021, 2023, 2024)

Most wins by a trainer:

- 3 – Christophe Clement (2020, 2023, 2024)

== Winners ==
Year	Winner	Age	Jockey	Trainer	Owner	Distance	Time	Purse	Grade	Ref
At Saratoga – Caress Stakes
2026	Movin' On Up	5	Tyler Gaffalione	Saffie Joseph Jr.	Kenneth L. Ramsey	5 1/2 furlongs	1:01.04	$242,500	II	
2025	Future Is Now	5	Paco Lopez	Michael J. Trombetta	The Estate Of R. Larry Johnson	5 1/2 furlongs	1:01.08	$175,000	III	
2024	Dontlookbackatall	4	Irad Ortiz Jr.	Christophe Clement	West Point Thoroughbreds, Scarlet Oak Racing & Titletown Racing Stables	5 1/2 furlongs	1:01.39	$200,000	III	
2023	Roses for Debra	4	Irad Ortiz Jr.	Christophe Clement	John O'Meara	5 1/2 furlongs	1:02.39	$194,000	III	
2022	Robin Sparkles	5	Javier Castellano	Bruce R. Brown	Michael Schrader	5 1/2 furlongs	1:01:98	$200,000	III	
2021	Caravel	4	Irad Ortiz Jr.	Elizabeth M. Merryman	Bobby Flay & Elizabeth M. Merryman	5 1/2 furlongs	1:02.38	$200,000	III	
2020	Cariba	4	Irad Ortiz Jr.	Christophe Clement	Cheyenne Stable	5 1/2 furlongs	1:01.53	$200,000	Listed	
2019	Mominou	4	Kendrick Carmouche	James J. Toner	Sean Shay	5 1/2 furlongs	1:01.54	$200,000	Listed	
2018	Ruby Notion	5	Florent Geroux	Darrin Miller	Silverton Hill	5 1/2 furlongs	1:06.43	$200,000	Listed	
2017	Miss Ella	5	Joel Rosario	H. Graham Motion	Jack Swain III	5 1/2 furlongs	1:02.30	$200,000		
2016	Miss Ella	4	Joel Rosario	H. Graham Motion	Jack Swain III	5 1/2 furlongs	1:04.05	$98,000		Off turf
2015	Thieves Guild	6	Jose Lezcano	James J. Toner	Ninety North Racing Stable	5 1/2 furlongs	1:00.82	$98,000		
2014	Free as a Bird	5	Joel Rosario	Ian R. Wilkes	Elizabeth J. Valando	5 1/2 furlongs	1:01.98	$100,000		
2013	Silverette	4	Robby Albarado	Dale L. Romans	Paul P. Pompa Jr.	5 1/2 furlongs	1:01.27	$100,000		
2012	Rosa Salvaje	4	Alex O. Solis	Lisa Lewis	William C. Schettine	5 1/2 furlongs	1:03.50	$100,000	Listed	
At Belmont Park
2011	Quebrada Shiner (ARG)	6	Ramon A. Dominguez	Robert A. Barbara	James A. & Jane N. Fraser	6 furlongs	1:09.10	$60,000		
2010	Race not held									
2009	Jazzy (ARG)	7	Alan Garcia	Mark A. Hennig	Team Valor International	6 furlongs	1:12.58	$68,200		
2008	Stormy West	4	Kent J. Desormeaux	William I. Mott	Diane & Guy B. Snowden	7 furlongs	1:21.29	$74,750		

== See also ==
- List of American and Canadian Graded races
