= Jamie Theriot =

American jockey (born 1979)

Personal information
- Born: January 30, 1979 (age 47) Arnaudville, Louisiana, United States
- Occupation: Jockey

Horse racing career
- Sport: Horse racing
- Career wins: 2,172

Major racing wins
- Lone Star Park Handicap (2003); Elkhorn Stakes (2007); Shadwell Turf Mile Stakes (2007); Opening Verse Handicap (2007); Aegon Turf Sprint Stakes (2008); Aristides Breeders' Cup Stakes (2008); Arlington-Washington Futurity Stakes (2008); Oklahoma Derby (2008); Shakertown Stakes (2008); Pucker Up Stakes (2008); Woodford Stakes (2008); Appalachian Stakes (2009); Black Gold Stakes (2009); Churchill Distaff Turf Mile Stakes (2009); Pennsylvania Governor's Cup Stakes (2010); Louisiana Handicap (2011)

Significant horses
- Blame, Purim, Terrain

Jamie Theriot (/ˈtɛrioʊ/; born January 30, 1979, in Arnaudville, Louisiana) is an American former jockey. The son of Thoroughbred horse trainer Harold Theriot, he is a nephew of jockey Larry Melancon.

Theriot, who began riding on bush tracks in his native Louisiana, turned professional at age 16. He competed primarily on the Louisiana-Arkansas-Kentucky racing circuit, where he won a riding title at Evangeline Downs in 2001 and the 2003 riding title at Oaklawn Park Race Track.

In 2007, Theriot won his first Grade 1 race, capturing the Shadwell Turf Mile Stakes aboard Purim at Keeneland Race Course. On May 17, 2008, he rode in his first American Classic, taking sixth place aboard Kentucky Bear in the Preakness Stakes at Pimlico Race Course. That June 18, he became the seventh rider in Churchill Downs history to ride six winners in a single day. In 2009, he won two Grade II races aboard Blame.

== Accident ==
On May 23, 2009, Theriot was aboard Sky Mom in the Grade III Arlington Matron at Arlington Park when she angled to the outside and clipped Born To Be, ridden by René Douglas. Born To Be clipped the horse running in front of her, knocking her unconscious and throwing Douglas headfirst into the track, paralyzing him from the waist down. Theriot was suspended for 30 days.

== Yearly relative earnings ==
Chart	Peak position
National Earnings List for Jockeys 2003	58
National Earnings List for Jockeys 2007	39
National Earnings List for Jockeys 2008	25
National Earnings List for Jockeys 2009	35
National Earnings List for Jockeys 2010	31

== Notes ==
- Jamie Theriot's biography at Keeneland
- June 19, 2008 NTRA article titled Theriot bags six winners at Churchill
- Churchill Downs story titled Sizzling Theriot Soars in Spring Jockey Standings
