= World of Trouble (horse) =

American Thoroughbred racehorse

- Breed: Thoroughbred
- Sire: Kantharos
- Dam: Meets Expectations
- Sex: Stallion
- Foaled: March 23, 2015
- Country: USA
- Breeder: Darsan Inc.
- Owner: Michael Dubb, Madaket Stables LLC, Bethlehem Stables LLC
- Trainer: Jason Servis
- Record: 13:9-2-1
- Earnings: $1,263,300

Major wins
- Jaipur Invitational Stakes (2019); Carter Handicap (2019); Twin Spires Turf Sprint Stakes (2019)
- Last updated on 25 August 2020

World of Trouble (foaled March 23, 2015) is an American Thoroughbred racehorse and the winner of the 2019 Jaipur Invitational Stakes.

== Career ==
World of Trouble's first race was on August 10, 2017, at Gulfstream Park, which he won. He won a series of races in 2018. He captured the Pasco Stakes on January 20. In August, he won the Quick Call Stakes, then won the Allied Forces Stakes in September. He then won the Marion Country Florida Sire Stakes in December to finish off 2018.

World of Trouble began a four-race win streak in January 2019. He won the Gulfstream Park Turf Sprint Stakes on January 26. Then on April 6, he captured the Carter Handicap. He then won the Twin Spires Turf Sprint Stakes on May 3, then won the Jaipur Invitational Stakes on June 8. Through 2019, he registered 13 career starts, winning nine time, finishing second twice, and finishing third once, with career earnings of $1,263,300.

== Pedigree ==
Pedigree of World of Trouble (USA), 2015
Sire Kantharos (USA) 2008	Lion Heart (USA); 2001	Tale of the Cat	Storm Cat
Sire Kantharos (USA) 2008	Lion Heart (USA); 2001	Tale of the Cat	Varn
Sire Kantharos (USA) 2008	Lion Heart (USA); 2001	Satin Sunrise	Mr. Leader
Sire Kantharos (USA) 2008	Lion Heart (USA); 2001	Satin Sunrise	Logic
Sire Kantharos (USA) 2008	Contessa Halo (USA); 1998	Southern Halo	Halo
Sire Kantharos (USA) 2008	Contessa Halo (USA); 1998	Southern Halo	Northern Sea
Sire Kantharos (USA) 2008	Contessa Halo (USA); 1998	Queen of Savoy	Conquistador Cielo
Sire Kantharos (USA) 2008	Contessa Halo (USA); 1998	Queen of Savoy	Jill of All Trades
Dam Meets Expectations (USA) 2004	Valid Expectations (USA); 1993	Valid Appeal	In Reality
Dam Meets Expectations (USA) 2004	Valid Expectations (USA); 1993	Valid Appeal	Desert Trial
Dam Meets Expectations (USA) 2004	Valid Expectations (USA); 1993	Mepache	Iron Constitution
Dam Meets Expectations (USA) 2004	Valid Expectations (USA); 1993	Mepache	Nowmepache
Dam Meets Expectations (USA) 2004	Meetmeontime (USA); 2000	General Meeting	Seattle Slew
Dam Meets Expectations (USA) 2004	Meetmeontime (USA); 2000	General Meeting	Alydars Promise
Dam Meets Expectations (USA) 2004	Meetmeontime (USA); 2000	Parlay	Mt. Livermore
Dam Meets Expectations (USA) 2004	Meetmeontime (USA); 2000	Parlay	Sister Aggie
