= Doctor Decherd =

American-bred Thoroughbred racehorse

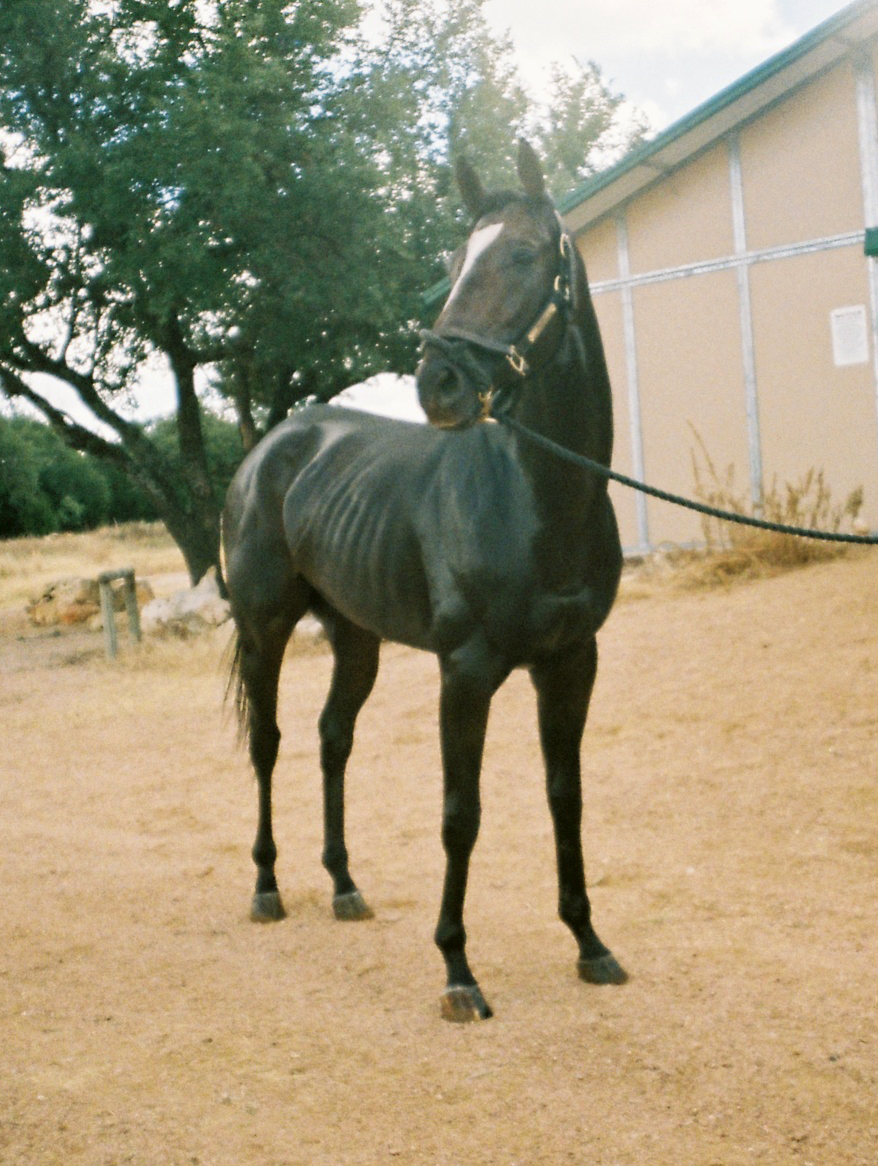
- Doctor Decherd in 2008
- Sire: Louis Quatorze
- Grandsire: Sovereign Dancer
- Dam: Hidden Pleasure
- Damsire: Proper Reality
- Sex: Gelding
- Foaled: 2003
- Country: United States
- Colour: Dark Bay
- Breeder: Calumet Farm
- Owner: Fans of Barbaro
- Trainer: Steve Asmussen
- Record: 30: 6-3-2
- Earnings: $159,069

Major wins
- Aventura Stakes (2006)

Doctor Decherd (foaled March 23, 2003) is a thoroughbred horse. He was a contender for the Triple Crown of Thoroughbred Racing in 2006. Doctor Decherd was on the Derby trail in 2006, and ran against Barbaro in the Holy Bull stakes (click the Holy Bull video), won the Aventura Stakes ridden by Jockey Shaun Bridgmohan and had dropped down into the 4K claiming ranks in the spring of 2008. Because of the proactive approach to this horse's trainer, by Friends Of Barbaro Linda & Patty, to offer a retirement home for Doctor Decherd - he was retired from the track in September 2008 and brought to Texas for rehab and retraining into a second career. Doctor Decherd has sponsors amongst the Friends Of Barbaro all over the country (and Canada), who contribute to his upkeep and all "own" a little piece this horse.

== Connections ==
Doctor Decherd is owned by Mike McCarty and was trained by Steve Asmussen. In all of his lifetime starts he has been ridden by Shaun Bridgmohan or Roman Chapa. Doctor Decherd was bred in Kentucky by Calumet Farm.

== Pedigree ==
Pedigree of Doctor Decherd
Sire Louis Quatorze	Sovereign Dancer	Northern Dancer	Nearctic
Sire Louis Quatorze	Sovereign Dancer	Northern Dancer	Natalma
Sire Louis Quatorze	Sovereign Dancer	Bold Princess	Bold Ruler
Sire Louis Quatorze	Sovereign Dancer	Bold Princess	Grey Flight
Sire Louis Quatorze	On To Royalty	On To Glory	Bold Lad
Sire Louis Quatorze	On To Royalty	On To Glory	Shenanigans
Sire Louis Quatorze	On To Royalty	Royal Ties	Distinctive
Sire Louis Quatorze	On To Royalty	Royal Ties	New Love
Dam Hidden Pleasure	Proper Reality	In Reality	Intentionally
Dam Hidden Pleasure	Proper Reality	In Reality	My Dear Girl
Dam Hidden Pleasure	Proper Reality	Proper Princess	Nodouble
Dam Hidden Pleasure	Proper Reality	Proper Princess	Proper Notice
Dam Hidden Pleasure	Andora (USA)	Conquistador Cielo	Mr Prospector
Dam Hidden Pleasure	Andora (USA)	Conquistador Cielo	K D Princess
Dam Hidden Pleasure	Andora (USA)	Sabin	Lyphard
Dam Hidden Pleasure	Andora (USA)	Sabin	Beaconiare
