= Unbridled Sidney Stakes =

- Class: Grade II
- Location: Churchill Downs; Louisville, Kentucky, United States
- Inaugurated: 2010
- Race type: Thoroughbred – Flat racing
- Sponsor: Cygames (2025)
- Website: Churchill Downs

Race information
- Distance: 5 1/2 furlongs
- Surface: Turf
- Track: Left-handed
- Qualification: Fillies & mares, three-years-old and older
- Weight: Base weights with allowances: 4-year-olds and up: 125 lbs. 3-year-olds: 120 lbs.
- Purse: $400,000 (2024)

The Unbridled Sidney Stakes is a Grade II American thoroughbred horse race for fillies and mares aged three and older over a distance of 5 1/2 furlongs on the turf held annually in early May at Churchill Downs in Louisville, Kentucky during the spring meeting. The event currently carries a purse of $400,000.

== History ==
The inaugural running of the event was on May 8, 2010, over a distance of five furlongs. The event was won by the 13-5 favorite Candy Cane by a neck and was ridden by Garrett Gomez.

The event is named for Unbridled Sidney, who won four of her seven starts at five furlongs over Churchill Downs’ Turf Course in 2005–07 for owners Douglas and Norrine Devenport and trainer Ronny Werner. Prior to the establishment of this event, Churchill Downs between 1997 and 2008 held an event with exactly the same conditions and scheduled on the Thursday before the Kentucky Derby known as the Mamzelle Stakes. In 2006 the winner of this event was Unbridled Sidney.

In 2011 and 2020, the event was moved off the turf and held on the dirt track due to wet conditions.

In 2019 the event's distance was increased to 5 1/2 furlongs. Also that year the event was scheduled during the opening week of Churchill Downs' spring meeting. In 2020 the purse was raised to $150,000 and in 2022 raised again $200,000 whereby the Thoroughbred Owners and Breeders Association awarded the event Listed status.

The 2023 event was won by the 2022 Grade I Breeders' Cup Turf Sprint winner Caravel who was resuming confirming that the event was attracting high quality entrants.

In 2024 the event was upgraded to Grade III by the Thoroughbred Owners and Breeders Association. In 2026 the event would be upgraded again to Grade II.

== Records ==
Speed record:

- 5 1/2 furlongs: 1:01.29 – Queen Maxima (2025) (new track record)
- 5 furlongs: 0:56.23 – Triple Chelsea (2018)

Margins

- 4 1/2 lengths – Good Deed (2013)

Most wins by a jockey:

- 3 – Shaun Bridgmohan (2011, 2012, 2013)
- 3 – Florent Geroux (2015, 2021, 2024)

Most wins by a trainer:

- 2 – Brian A. Lynch (2022, 2026)

Most wins by an owner:

- 2 – Ike and Dawn Thrash (2012, 2015)

== Winners ==
Year	Winner	Age	Jockey	Trainer	Owner	Distance	Time	Purse	Grade	Ref
2026	Moon Spun	5	Javier Castellano	Brian A. Lynch	Town and Country Racing	5 1/2 furlongs	1:01.64	$474,000	II	
2025	Queen Maxima	4	Juan J. Hernandez	Jeff Mullins	Dutch Girl Holdings & Irving Ventures	5 1/2 furlongs	1:01.29	$329,500	III	
2024	Ova Charged	6	Florent Geroux	Shane Wilson	Brittlyn Stable	5 1/2 furlongs	1:03.71	$332,000	III	
2023	Caravel	6	Tyler Gaffalione	Brad H. Cox	Qatar Racing, Marc Detampel & Madaket Stables	5 1/2 furlongs	1:02.47	$300,000	Listed	
2022	Tobys Heart	5	Jose L. Ortiz	Brian A. Lynch	Gary Barber, Terry Hamilton & Brian A. Lynch	5 1/2 furlongs	1:04.11	$199,835	Listed	
2021	Into Mystic	5	Florent Geroux	Brendan P. Walsh	Coleman, George Chris & Brad King	5 1/2 furlongs	1:05.89	$150,000		
2020	Ambassador Luna	4	Julien Leparoux	James Gulick	Voodoomon Racing	5 1/2 furlongs	1:03.56	$150,000		Off turf
2019	A Little Bit Me	5	John R. Velazquez	Richard Baltas	Christopher Johnson	5 1/2 furlongs	1:04.57	$125,000		
2018	Triple Chelsea	5	Adam Beschizza	Joe Sharp	Brad Grady	5 furlongs	0:56.23	$70,865		
2017	Nobody's Fault	5	Corey Lanerie	Neil L. Pessin	Lothenbach Stables	5 furlongs	0:56.65	$64,600		
2016	Acapulco	3	Robby Albarado	Wesley A. Ward	Derrick Smith, Mrs. John Magnier & Michael Tabor	5 furlongs	0:57.47	$63,433		
2015	Katie's Eyes	4	Florent Geroux	Michael Stidham	Ike Thrash, Dawn, Alley, Janet Thrash & Sam Alley	5 furlongs	0:56.44	$66,029		
2014	Sweet Cassiopeia	8	Joseph Rocco Jr.	William R. Connelly	Steve C. Snowden & Dan Considine	5 furlongs	0:57.58	$65,142		
2013	Good Deed	4	Shaun Bridgmohan	Steven R. Margolis	Bert, Elaine & Richard Klein	5 furlongs	0:57.37	$64,418		
2012	Wild About Marie	5	Shaun Bridgmohan	Jeffrey D. Thornbury	Ike & Dawn Thrash	5 furlongs	0:56.24	$57,385		
2011	Little Polka Dot	5	Shaun Bridgmohan	Thomas M. Amoss	Maggi Moss	5 furlongs	0:57.34	$53,210		Off turf
2010	Candy Cane	6	Garrett Gomez	Richard E. Dutrow Jr.	Michael Dubb	5 furlongs	0:57.45	$54,972		

Legend:
Dirt Turf

== See also ==
- List of American and Canadian Graded races
