= Kelly's Landing Stakes =

- Class: Grade III
- Location: Churchill Downs; Louisville, Kentucky, United States
- Inaugurated: 2010
- Race type: Thoroughbred - Flat racing
- Website: www.churchilldowns.com

Race information
- Distance: 6 1/2 furlongs
- Surface: dirt
- Track: left-handed
- Qualification: Three years old and older
- Weight: 125 lbs with allowances
- Purse: $250,000 (2024)

The Kelly's Landing Stakes is a Grade III American Thoroughbred horse race for three-year-olds and older over a distance six and one-half furlongs on the dirt scheduled annually in late June at Churchill Downs in Louisville, Kentucky.

== History ==
The event was named after Summerplace Farm's Kelly's Landing, who earned $1,853,831 from a record of 10-3-2 in 27 starts for trainer Eddie Kenneally between 2004 and 2009. The gelding won the six-furlong Grade III Aristides Handicap at Churchill Downs in 2005 by stopping in a track record 1:07.55 which has since been broken. His biggest victory came in the 2007 Dubai Golden Shaheen at Nad Al Sheba in the United Arab Emirates. Kelly's Landing also won the 2006 GIII Phoenix Stakes at Keeneland and 2007 GIII Mr. Prospector Handicap at Gulfstream Park.

The event was inaugurated on June 25, 2010, over a distance of seven furlongs and was won by Brandon L. & Marianne I. Chase's Here Comes Ben, who started as the short 7/10 odds-on favorite winning by a neck in furious fully extended five-wide bid in a time of 1:21.89. Ridden by Hall of Fame jockey Alex Solis, it was his third straight win. In his next start he caused a mild upset in winning the Grade I Forego Stakes at Saratoga.

The following year Here Comes Ben returned and convincingly won the event by 3 1/4 lengths, this time ridden by veteran jockey Jon Court. Here Comes Ben raced one more time before being retired from and moving on to career in stud, first at McMahon of Saratoga Thoroughbreds in New York State and later moving to Jamaica where he was a successful sire.

Between 2017 and 2022 the event was run as the Kelly's Landing Overnight Stakes.

In 2020 due to the COVID-19 pandemic in the United States, Churchill Downs did not schedule the event in their updated and shortened September meeting.

In 2022 the event's distance was decreased to 6 1/2 furlongs.

In 2023 the event was moved to Ellis Park after Churchill Downs closed their spring meeting earlier due to a spate of injuries.

After three runnings of the event with Listed status, in 2025 the event was upgraded to Grade III by the Thoroughbred Owners and Breeders Association.

Other notable winners of the event include Bango, who has started in the event four times and has won it twice. Bango is the winningest in Churchill Downs history having won twelve times at Churchill Downs. The Maryland-bred Aloha West on his first attempt in the event in 2021 finished fourth to Bango. However, later in the year the horse was brilliant in winning the Grade I Breeders' Cup Sprint at Del Mar. In 2022 Aloha West returned to run in the event and after having a poor start rallied three-wide on the turn and won by a neck as the 9/10 odds-on favorite. Bango finished 4th in the same event. Aloha West would have one more start in the Breeders' Cup Sprint at Keeneland before retiring.

== Records ==
Speed record:

- 6 1/2 furlongs: 1:14.89 – Closethegame Sugar (2024)
- 7 furlongs: 1:21.25 – Bango (2021)

Margins:

- 5 lengths – Right to Vote (2013)

Most wins:

- 2 – Here Comes Ben (2010, 2011)
- 2 – Bango (2021, 2023)

Most wins by a jockey:

- 2 – Brian Hernandez Jr. (2014, 2015)
- 2 – Shaun Bridgmohan (2013, 2018)
- 2 – Tyler Gaffalione (2021, 2023)

Most wins by a trainer:

- 2 – Charlie LoPresti (2010, 2011)
- 2 – Greg Foley (2021, 2023)

Most wins by an owner:

- 2 – Brandon L. & Marianne I. Chase (2010, 2011)
- 2 – Tamaroak Partners (2021, 2023)

== Winners ==
Year	Winner	Age	Jockey	Trainer	Owner	Distance	Time	Purse	Grade	Ref
At Churchill Downs - Bango Stakes
2026	Harrodsburg	6	Luis Saez	Michael A. Tomlinson	Rod Hatfield and Bud Hatfield	6 1/2 furlongs	1:15.95	$275,000	III	
At Churchill Downs – Kelly's Landing Stakes
2025	Roll On Big Joe	5	Julien Leparoux	Robert Hess Jr.	Rancho Temescal, White Fence & Richard Hale Jr.	6 1/2 furlongs	1:15.22	$220,000	III	
2024	Closethegame Sugar	4	Irad Ortiz Jr.	Adam Rice	Adam Rice & Sugar Diaz	6 1/2 furlongs	1:14.89	$235,000	Listed	
At Ellis Park
2023	Bango	6	Tyler Gaffalione	Gregory D. Foley	Tamaroak Partners	6 1/2 furlongs	1:15.02	$225,000	Listed	
At Churchill Downs – Kelly's Landing Overnight Stakes
2022	Aloha West	5	Joel Rosario	Wayne M. Catalano	Eclipse Thoroughbred Partners	6 1/2 furlongs	1:15.44	$120,350	Listed	
2021	Bango	4	Tyler Gaffalione	Gregory D. Foley	Tamaroak Partners	7 furlongs	1:21.25	$107,025		
2020	Race not held									
2019	Line Judge	5	Corey Lanerie	Peter Miller	Tom Kagele	7 furlongs	1:21.35	$120,600		
2018	C Z Rocket	4	Shaun Bridgmohan	Albert M. Stall Jr.	Frank Fletcher Racing Operations	7 furlongs	1:21.51	$68,130		
2017	Limousine Liberal	5	Robby Albarado	Ben Colebrook	Katherine G. Ball	7 furlongs	1:23.08	$70,893		
Kelly's Landing Stakes
2016	Alsvid	7	Chris Landeros	Chris A. Hartman	Black Hawk Stable	7 furlongs	1:22.55	$64,465		
2015	Viva Majorca	4	Brian Hernandez Jr.	Ian R. Wilkes	Marylou Whitney Stables	7 furlongs	1:22.12	$67,750		
2014	Good Lord	7	Brian Hernandez Jr.	Forrest H. Kaelin	Thomas D. Shank & Stan Young	7 furlongs	1:22.45	$58,128		
2013	Right to Vote	4	Shaun Bridgmohan	Ron Moquett	B J D Thoroughbreds	7 furlongs	1:22.44	$60,325		
2012	Delaunay	5	Leandro D. Goncalves	Thomas M. Amoss	Maggi Moss	7 furlongs	1:22.77	$67,000		
2011	Here Comes Ben	5	Jon Court	Charlie LoPresti	Brandon L. & Marianne I. Chase	7 furlongs	1:22.26	$76,445		
2010	Here Comes Ben	4	Alex Solis	Charlie LoPresti	Brandon L. & Marianne I. Chase	7 furlongs	1:21.89	$65,387		

== See also ==
- List of American and Canadian Graded races
