= Mamzelle Stakes =

- Class: Grade III
- Location: Churchill Downs; Louisville, Kentucky, United States
- Inaugurated: Initial: 1997–2008; Reestablished: 2018 (as Mamzelle Overnight Stakes)
- Race type: Thoroughbred – Flat racing
- Website: Churchill Downs

Race information
- Distance: 5 1/2 furlongs
- Surface: Turf
- Track: Left-handed
- Qualification: Three-years-old fillies
- Weight: Base weight with allowances: 122 lbs.
- Purse: $225,000 (2025)

The Mamzelle Stakes is a Grade III American thoroughbred horse race for three-year-old fillies over a distance of 5 1/2 furlongs on the turf held annually in early May at Churchill Downs in Louisville, Kentucky during the spring meeting. The event currently carries a purse of $225,000.

== History ==
=== Initial (1997–2008) ===
The inaugural running of the event was on May 1, 1997, over a distance of five furlongs for fillies and mares that were three years old or older. The event was won by the Pent Up Kiss by a neck and was ridden by US Hall of Fame jockey Mike E. Smith.

The event was scheduled on the Thursday meeting prior to the Kentucky Derby and held accordingly until 2008.

The 2001 event was won by the Group 1 winning Chilean-bred mare Seperata, who set a new record of 55.92 seconds winning by six lengths.

The Larry Rivelli trained Nicole's Dream in 2005 became the only mare to win the event twice.

In 2009 the event was not scheduled. However, Churchill Downs in 2010 on the Thursday before the Kentucky Derby, scheduled a newly named race which had identical conditions as the Mamzelle Stakes, namely the Unbridled Sidney Stakes. Unbridled Sidney was a winner of the Mamzelle Stakes in 2006.

=== Renewal (2019– ) ===
In 2019 the event was reestablished with the new conditions for entry – that only three-year-old fillies could start. The event was scheduled to be held the Saturday after the Kentucky Derby and was named as the Mamzelle Overnight Stakes.

In 2020 due to the COVID-19 pandemic in the United States, Churchill Downs did not schedule the event in their updated and shortened September meeting.

The 2022 event was won by the 2021 Grade II Breeders' Cup Juvenile Turf Sprint Irish-bred winner Twilight Gleaming. Also the purse was raised to $150,000 and in 2022 raised again $200,000 whereby the Thoroughbred Owners and Breeders Association awarded the event Listed status.

In 2023 the event's distance was increased to 5 1/2 furlongs. In 2024 the event's name was restored back to the Mamzelle Stakes.

In 2025 the event was upgraded to Grade III by the Thoroughbred Owners and Breeders Association.

== Records ==
Speed record

- 5 1/2 furlongs: 1:01.46 – Shisospicy (2025)
- 5 furlongs: 0:55.92 (New Track Record) – Separata (CHI) (2001)

Margins

- 6 lengths – Separata (CHI) (2001)

Most wins by a jockey:

- 4 – Robby Albarado (2000, 2004, 2006, 2007)

Most wins by a trainer:

- 2 – Richard E. Mandella (1999, 2001)
- 2 – Thomas M. Amoss (2002, 2003)
- 2 – Larry Rivelli (2004, 2005)
- 2 – Jose D'Angelo (2024, 2025)

Most wins by an owner:

- 2 – Dare To Dream Stable 4 (2004, 2005)

== Winners ==
Year	Winner	Age	Jockey	Trainer	Owner	Distance	Time	Purse	Grade	Ref
Mamzelle Stakes
2026	Cy Fair	3	Irad Ortiz Jr.	George Weaver	Medallion Racing, Swinbank Stables, Joey Platts & Mark Stanton	5 1/2 furlongs	1:01.90	$299,250	III	
2025	Shisospicy	3	Jose L. Ortiz	Jose D'Angelo	Morplay Racing	5 1/2 furlongs	1:01.46	$224,625	III	
2024	Twirling Queen	3	Francisco Arrieta	Jose D'Angelo	GU Racing Stable	5 1/2 furlongs	1:03.12	$224,930	Listed	
Mamzelle Overnight Stakes
2023	Danse Macabre	3	Adam Beschizza	Kelsey Danner	NBS Stable and Elements Racing	5 1/2 furlongs	1:02.98	$224,750	Listed	
2022	Twilight Gleaming (IRE)	3	Tyler Gaffalione	Wesley A. Ward	Stonestreet Stables	5 furlongs	0:58.22	$114,500	Listed	
2021	Lady Edith	3	Brian Hernandez Jr.	Thomas Drury Jr.	J. David Richardson & Sandra New	5 furlongs	0:57.04	$108,075		
2020	Race not held									
2019	Change of Control	3	Gabriel Saez	Michelle Lovell	Roddy Harrison	5 furlongs	0:56.25	$98,350		
2009–2018		Race not held								
Mamzelle Stakes
2008	Just for Keeps	4	Garrett Gomez	Michael J. Maker	Kenneth and Sarah Ramsey	5 furlongs	0:56.09	$110,400	Listed	
2007	Smitty's Sunshine	5	Robby Albarado	Morris G. Nicks	Roger G. Smith	5 furlongs	0:56.92	$111,100	Listed	
2006	Unbridled Sidney	5	Robby Albarado	Ronny W. Werner	Douglas Devenport	5 furlongs	0:56.96	$113,600	Listed	
2005	Nicole's Dream	5	Eddie Martin Jr.	Larry Rivelli	Dare To Dream Stable 4	5 furlongs	0:56.41	$112,100	Listed	
2004	Nicole's Dream	4	Robby Albarado	Larry Rivelli	Dare To Dream Stable 4	5 furlongs	0:56.40	$117,700	Listed	
2003	Full Spectrum	4	Calvin Borel	Thomas M. Amoss	Phoebe Mueller Trust	5 furlongs	0:56.09	$113,500	Listed	
2002	Repository	4	Lonnie Meche	Thomas M. Amoss	Mary L. Bonham	5 furlongs	0:58.19	$114,000	Listed	
2001	Separata (CHI)	5	Alex O. Solis	Richard E. Mandella	Diamond A Racing	5 furlongs	0:55.92	$109,700	Listed	
2000	Steal a Heart	5	Robby Albarado	Alice G. Cohn	Jeffrey S. Amling	5 furlongs	0:56.11	$111,000	Listed	
1999	Desert Lady (IRE)	6	Corey Nakatani	Richard E. Mandella	The Thoroughbred Corporation	5 furlongs	0:56.79	$114,600	Listed	
1998	Oh Nellie	4	Gary L. Stevens	Todd A. Pletcher	Michael B. Tabor	5 furlongs	0:57.45	$120,700	Listed	
1997	Pent Up Kiss	5	Mike E. Smith	Benjamin W. Perkins Sr.	New Farm	5 furlongs	0:56.67	$113,900	Listed	

Legend:
Dirt Turf

== See also ==
- List of American and Canadian Graded races
