= Shawnee Stakes =

Grade II Thoroughbred horse race

- Class: Grade II
- Location: Churchill Downs; Louisville, Kentucky, United States
- Inaugurated: 1983
- Race type: Thoroughbred – Flat racing
- Website: Churchill Downs

Race information
- Distance: 1 1/16 miles
- Surface: Dirt
- Track: left-handed
- Qualification: Fillies & mares, four years old & older
- Weight: 123 lbs. with allowance
- Purse: US$275,000 (since 2024)

The Shawnee Stakes is a Grade II American Thoroughbred horse race for fillies and mares aged four and older, on the dirt over a distance of 1 1/16 miles held annually in late May or early June at Churchill Downs in Louisville, Kentucky. The event currently offers a purse of $275,000.

== History ==
The event is named after the Shawnee, who are an Indigenous people of the Northeastern Woodlands where currently Louisville is located.

The event was inaugurated on 23 July 1983 as an event for fillies and mares of age three and older, and run over a distance of one mile and was won by Everett Lowrance's Leader Miss. Leader Miss was a longshot starting at odds of 12/1 was ridden by jockey Keith Allen, led almost all the way, opening up a lead of three lengths before winning by a length over Kitchen with Queen Of Song in third place in a time of 1:36 4/5.

The following year the event was won by the Grade I winning mare Try Something New who started as a short 3/10 odds-on favorite.

The event was discontinued and was idle for thirty-six years when in 2020 it was reintroduced over slightly longer distance of 1 1/16 miles.

In 2023 the event was upgraded by the Thoroughbred Owners and Breeders Association to a Grade III. The event was upgraded again to Grade II status in 2026.

== Records ==
Speed record

- 1 1/16 miles: 1:42.07 – Splendora (2026)
- 1 mile: 1:36.70 – Leader Miss (1983)

Margins

- 4 1/4 lengths – Envoutante (2021)

Most wins by a jockey

- 2 – Flavien Prat (2025, 2026)

Most wins by a trainer

- No trainer has won the event more than once

Most wins by an owner

- 2 – Juddmonte Farms (2023, 2024)

== Winners ==
Year	Winner	Age	Jockey	Trainer	Owner	Distance	Time	Purse	Grade	Ref
2026	Splendora	5	Flavien Prat	Bob Baffert	Boyd Racing & By Talla Racing	1 1/16 miles	1:42.07	$263,500	II	
2025	Royal Spa	5	Flavien Prat	Rodolphe Brisset	Breffni Farm	1 1/16 miles	1:42.20	$275,000	III	
2024	Scylla	4	Javier Castellano	William I. Mott	Juddmonte Farms	1 1/16 miles	1:42.38	$275,000	III	
2023	Idiomatic	4	Florent Geroux	Brad H. Cox	Juddmonte Farms	1 1/16 miles	1:42.13	$224,750	III	
2022	She's All Wolfe	5	Francisco Arrieta	Donnie Von Hemel	Robert H. Zoellner	1 1/16 miles	1:43.34	$179,500	Listed	
2021	Envoutante	4	Brian Hernandez Jr.	Kenneth G. McPeek	Walking L Thoroughbreds & Three Chimneys Farm	1 1/16 miles	1:42.59	$150,000		
2020	Dunbar Road	4	José Ortiz	Chad C. Brown	Peter M. Brant	1 1/16 miles	1:43.65	$100,000		
1985–2019		Race not held								
1984	Try Something New	5	Garth Patterson	Claude R. McGaughey III	John A. Bell III	1 mile	1:38:00	$41,250		
1983	Leader Miss	4	Keith Allen	James J. Eckrosh	Everett Lowrance	1 mile	1:36.80	$40,550		

== See also ==
- List of American and Canadian Graded races
