= Twin Spires Turf Sprint Stakes =

- Class: Grade II
- Location: Churchill Downs; Louisville, Kentucky, United States
- Inaugurated: 1995 (as Churchill Downs Turf Sprint Stakes)
- Race type: Thoroughbred - Flat racing
- Sponsor: Accenture (2026)
- Website: Churchill Downs

Race information
- Distance: 5 1/2 furlongs
- Surface: Turf
- Track: Left-handed
- Qualification: Three-year-olds and older
- Weight: Base weights with allowances: 4-year-olds and up: 124 lbs. 3-year-olds: 122 lbs.
- Purse: $600,000 (2024)

The Twin Spires Turf Sprint Stakes is a Grade II American thoroughbred horse race for horses age three and older over a distance of 5 1/2 furlongs on the turf held annually in early May on the Kentucky Oaks day meeting at Churchill Downs in Louisville, Kentucky during the spring meeting.

== History ==
The event was inaugurated on 5 May 1995 as the Churchill Downs Turf Sprint Stakes as the sixth race on the undercard of the Kentucky Oaks day meeting over a distance of five furlongs. The event was won by the second favorite Long Suit, who led all the way to record a 1 3/4 length victory in a time of 56.90 seconds.

In 1999, Aegon committed to a long term sponsorship which reflected in the name of the event. This sponsorship ended in 2009. In 2011 Churchill Downs administration renamed the event to the current name, Twin Spires Turf Sprint Stakes.

The event was first classified as Grade III in 2001 and a Grade II race in 2020.

In 2015, Power Alert set the course record of 0.55.17.

In 2019, the distance of the event was increased to 5 1/2 furlongs.

== Records ==
Speed record

- 5 1/2 furlongs: 1:02.20 - Yellow Card (2026)
- 5 furlongs: 55.17 - Power Alert (2015)

Margins

- 3 3/4 lengths - World of Trouble (2019)

Most wins by a jockey

- 3 - Julien Leparoux (2006, 2010, 2015)
- 3 - Irad Ortiz Jr. (2021, 2022, 2024)

Most wins by a trainer

- 3 - W. Bret Calhoun (2008, 2009, 2014)
- 3 - Steven M. Asmussen (2007, 2011, 2024)

Most wins by an owner

- 2 - Mike Cloonan (2001, 2005)
- 2 - Carl R. Moore Management (2008, 2009)
- 2 - Martin Racing Stable (2008, 2014)
- 2 - Heiligbrodt Racing Stable (2007, 2024)

== Winners ==
Year	Winner	Age	Jockey	Trainer	Owner	Distance	Time	Purse	Grade	Ref
Twin Spires Turf Sprint Stakes
2026	Yellow Card	5	Flavien Prat	Michael W. McCarthy	James M. Daniell	5 1/2 furlongs	1:02.20	$594,600	II	
2025	Think Big	4	Ben Curtis	Michael Stidham	Godolphin	5 1/2 furlongs	1:02.35	$569,600	II	
2024	Cogburn	5	Irad Ortiz Jr.	Steven M. Asmussen	Clark O. Brewster, William L. & Corinne Heiligbrodt	5 1/2 furlongs	1:03.16	$569,770	II	
2023	Nobals	4	Gerardo Corrales	Larry Rivelli	Patricia's Hope	5 1/2 furlongs	1:02.45	$500,000	II	
2022	Arrest Me Red	4	Irad Ortiz Jr.	Wesley A. Ward	Lael Stables	5 1/2 furlongs	1:04.18	$500,000	II	
2021	Fast Boat	6	Irad Ortiz Jr.	Joe Sharp	Brad Grady	5 1/2 furlongs	1:03.29	$250,000	II	
2020	Diamond Oops	5	Florent Geroux	Patrick Biancone	Diamond 100 Racing Club, Amy E Dunne Et Al	5 1/2 furlongs	1:04.18	$250,000	II	
2019	World of Trouble	4	Manuel Franco	Jason Servis	Michael Dubb, Madaket Stables & Bethlehem Stables	5 1/2 furlongs	1:03.97	$250,000	II	
2018	Will Call	4	Shaun Bridgmohan	Brad H. Cox	Klein Racing	5 furlongs	0:56.68	$200,000	III	
2017	Green Mask	6	Javier Castellano	Brad H. Cox	Abdullah Saeed Almaddah	5 furlongs	0:58.02	$150,000	III	
2016	Rocket Heat	4	Flavien Prat	Vann Belvoir	Mike Sanchez	5 furlongs	0:56.47	$150,000	III	
2015	Power Alert (AUS)	5	Julien R. Leparoux	Brian A. Lynch	James Covello, AJ Suited Racing Stable & Brian A. Lynch	5 furlongs	0:55.17	$150,000	III	
2014	Marchman	4	Robby Albarado	W. Bret Calhoun	Martin Racing Stable	5 furlongs	0:56.04	$167,550	III	
2013	Berlino Di Tiger (BRZ)	5	Leandro D. Goncalves	Eduardo Caramori	Stud Sampaio	5 furlongs	0:57.01	$138,250	III	
2012	Great Attack	5	Joel Rosario	Wesley A. Ward	Houyhnhnm Stable	5 furlongs	0:56.61	$150,350	III	
2011	Regally Ready	4	Corey Nakatani	Steven M. Asmussen	Vinery Stables	5 furlongs	0:56.57	$111,200	III	
Churchill Downs Turf Sprint Stakes
2010	Silver Timber	7	Julien R. Leparoux	Chad C. Brown	Michael Dubb & High Grade Racing Stable Dubb	5 furlongs	0:55.45	$119,100	III	
Aegon Turf Sprint Stakes
2009	Chamberlain Bridge	5	Garrett K. Gomez	W. Bret Calhoun	Carl Moore Management	5 furlongs	0:57.06	$112,800	III	
2008	Mr. Nightlinger	4	Jamie Theriot	W. Bret Calhoun	Martin Racing Stable & Carl Moore Management	5 furlongs	0:56.18	$126,400	III	
2007	Gaff	5	John R. Velazquez	Steven M. Asmussen	Heiligbrodt Racing Stable	5 furlongs	0:56.84	$169,050	III	
2006	Man Of Illusion (AUS)	5	Julien R. Leparoux	Patrick L. Biancone	A. C. Cotter, D H K Investments, R. Goldbloom et al.	5 furlongs	0:56.28	$116,000	III	
2005	Mighty Beau	6	Pat Valenzuela	Jeff Mullins	Mike Cloonan & Anthony Carolan	5 furlongs	0:56.18	$113,500	III	
2004	Lydgate	4	Pat Day	Eoin G. Harty	Darley Stable	5 furlongs	0:56.56	$114,700	III	
2003	Fiscally Speaking	4	Jon Court	Carl A. Nafzger	Janis R. Whitman	5 furlongs	0:56.01	$115,300	III	
2002	Testify	5	Eddie Delahoussaye	Randy L. Morse	Robert S. Mitchell Trust	5 furlongs	0:57.39	$121,300	III	
2001	Morluc	4	Robby Albarado	Randy L. Morse	Michael Cloonan	5 furlongs	0:56.60	$113,700	III	
2000	Bold Fact	5	Richard Migliore	John C. Kimmel	Juddmonte Farms	5 furlongs	0:56.37	$121,500	Listed	
1999	Howbaddouwantit	4	Mike E. Smith	Benjamin W. Perkins Jr.	Larry F. Hall	5 furlongs	0:57.03	$115,300	Listed	
Churchill Downs Turf Sprint Stakes
1998	Indian Rocket (GB)	4	Gary L. Stevens	Kiaran P. McLaughlin	Shadwell Racing	5 furlongs	0:57.32	$122,500	Listed	
1997	Sandtrap	4	Alex O. Solis	Ben D. A. Cecil	Estate of Robert E. Hibbert	5 furlongs	0:56.51	$115,700	Listed	
1996	Danjur	4	Jerry D. Bailey	Neil D. Drysdale	Aaron U. Jones	5 furlongs	0:56.09	$88,125	Listed	
1995	Long Suit	4	Willie Martinez	Angel O. Montano Sr.	Larry Telle	5 furlongs	0:56.90	$87,825	Listed	

== See also ==
- List of American and Canadian Graded races

== External Sites ==
- $500,000 Twin Spires Turf Sprint presented by Cohere Health (Grade II)
