= Shaun Bridgmohan =

American jockey (born 1979)

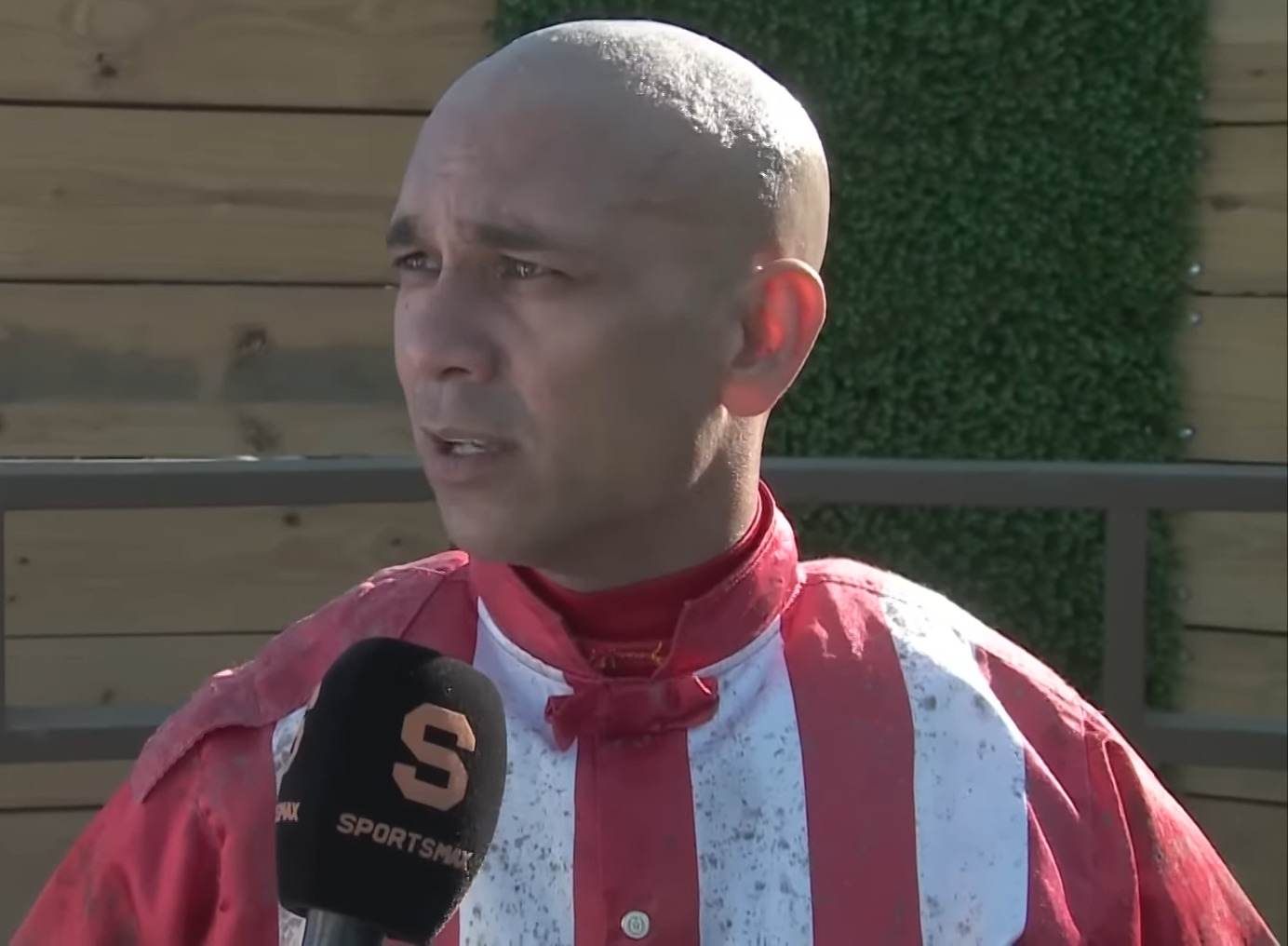
- Bridgmohan in 2024

Personal information
- Born: June 24, 1979 (age 47) Spanish Town, Jamaica
- Occupation: Jockey

Horse racing career
- Sport: Horse racing
- Career wins: 3,000+ (ongoing)

Major racing wins
- Gravesend Handicap (1998); Morven Stakes (1998, 2000); Gotham Stakes (1999); Stymie Handicap (1999); Carter Handicap (2000, 2001); Bowling Green Handicap (2000, 2002); Toboggan Handicap (2000, 2001); Queens County Handicap (2001); Aqueduct Handicap (2002); Jockey Club Gold Cup (2002); Poker Handicap (2002, 2004); Red Smith Handicap (2002); Cicada Stakes (2003); Comely Stakes (2003); Hill Prince Stakes (2003); First Flight Handicap (2004); Jerome Handicap (2004); Arlington Oaks (2005); Dogwood Stakes (2005); Pucker Up Stakes (2005); Spinaway Stakes (2006); Garden City Handicap (2007); Forego Handicap (2007); Saratoga Special Stakes (2007); Jefferson Cup Stakes (2007); West Virginia Derby (2007); Kentucky Cup Classic Stakes (2008); Louisiana Derby (2008); Northern Dancer Stakes (2008); Opening Verse Handicap 2008); Pimlico Special (2008); Gannon Cup (2008); Risen Star Stakes (2008); Lecomte Stakes (2008); Ack Ack Handicap (2005, 2008); West Virginia Governor's Stakes (2008); Cigar Mile Handicap (2009); Louisiana Handicap (2010); Donn Handicap (2011); Black Gold Stakes (2013); Stars and Stripes Stakes (2016)

Racing awards
- Eclipse Award for Outstanding Apprentice Jockey (1998)

Significant horses
- Volponi, Evening Attire, Midnight Lute, Pyro, Giant Oak

Shaun Xavier Bridgmohan (born June 24, 1979, in Spanish Town, Jamaica) is a Jamaican-American jockey who competes in Thoroughbred horse racing.

At age thirteen, Bridgmohan's family emigrated to the United States, settling in South Florida where he developed an interest in horse racing. Before becoming a jockey, and while still in school, he worked at a Florida racetrack as a hot walker, groom, and as an exercise rider. After graduating from high school he pursued a riding career and in August 1997 earned his first win at Calder Race Course. Six months later on February 15, 1998, he won six races on a single card at Aqueduct Racetrack in Queens, New York, finishing 1998, which was his breakout year, as the winner of the Eclipse Award for Outstanding Apprentice Jockey. On December 22, 2007, he again won six races on a single card, this time at Fair Grounds Race Course in New Orleans, Louisiana. On April 1, 2017, he recorded his 3,000th win.

== Horses ridden by Shaun Bridgmohan ==
- Gaff in the $100,000 Mr. Prospector Handicap at Gulfstream Park
- On Thin Ice in the $100,000 Hal's Hope Handicap
- Doctor Decherd in the $125,000 Aventura Stakes

== References to Shaun Bridgmohan in popular culture ==
Bridgmohan was mentioned in the rap song "Fake Patois" by Das Racist, with the line "What you know about Shaun Bridgmohan?/What you know about Shaun Bridgmohan?/First Jamaican in the Kentucky Derby/First Jamaican in the Kentucky Derby."

Despite the lyric, Bridgmohan was actually the second Jamaican jockey to race in the Kentucky Derby, doing so first in 2006 atop the horse Private Vow and a second time, including a second-place finish, riding atop Commanding Curve in 2014, when he was joined by fellow Jamaican jockey Rajiv Maragh, who placed fourth atop Wicked Strong. The first Jamaican in the Kentucky Derby was actually Richard DePass, appearing in both 1978 atop the horse Hoist the Silver and 1979 riding Great Redeemer.

Bridgmohan was also referenced in the song "Shorty Said" by Das Racist, with the lyric, "Shorty said I look like Shaun Bridgmohan."

== Year-end charts ==
Chart (2000–present)	Peak position
National Earnings List for Jockeys 2000	33
National Earnings List for Jockeys 2001	50
National Earnings List for Jockeys 2002	17
National Earnings List for Jockeys 2003	25
National Earnings List for Jockeys 2004	26
National Earnings List for Jockeys 2005	18
National Earnings List for Jockeys 2006	29
National Earnings List for Jockeys 2007	25
National Earnings List for Jockeys 2008	17
National Earnings List for Jockeys 2009	31
National Earnings List for Jockeys 2010	21
National Earnings List for Jockeys 2011	36
National Earnings List for Jockeys 2012	25
National Earnings List for Jockeys 2013	21
National Earnings List for Jockeys 2014	33
National Earnings List for Jockeys 2015	40
