= Churchill Downs =

Thoroughbred racetrack in Louisville, Kentucky, United States

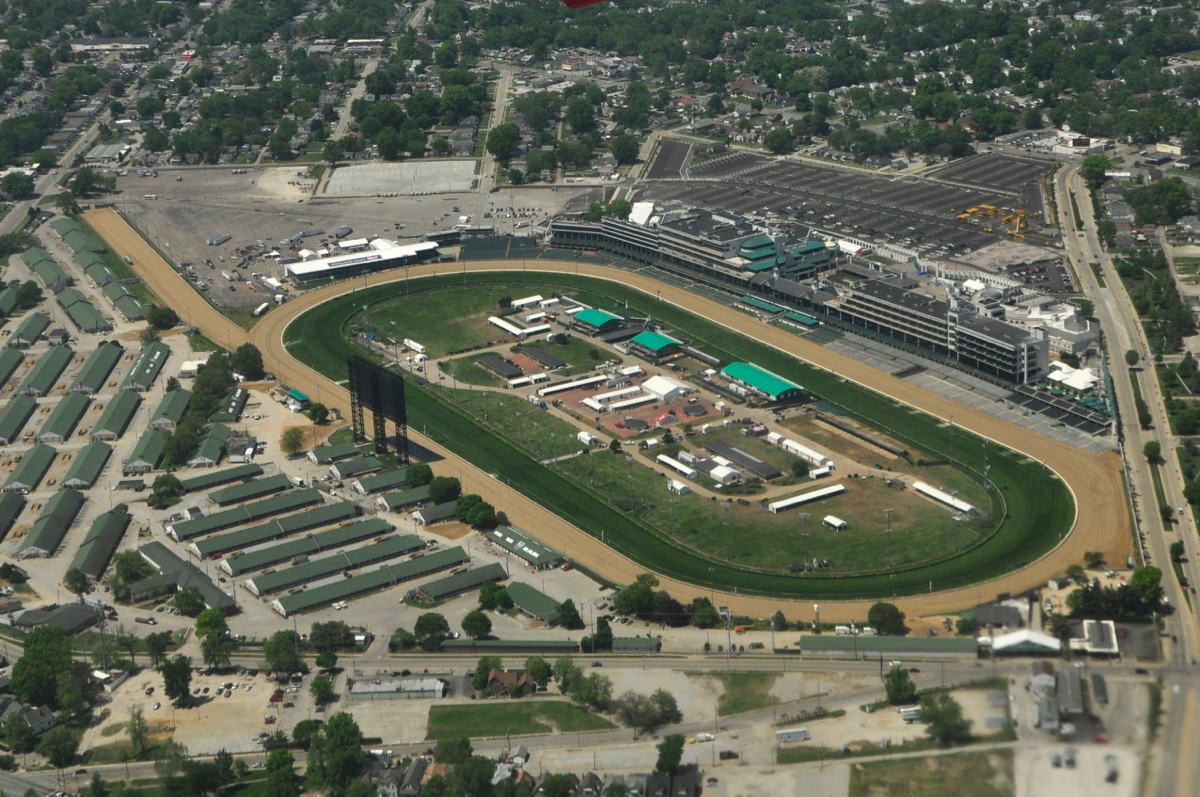
- Aerial view of Churchill Downs in May 2018
- Interactive map of Churchill Downs
- Location: 700 Central Avenue; South Louisville; Louisville, Kentucky; United States
- Coordinates: 38°12′11″N 85°46′12″W
- Owned by: Churchill Downs Incorporated
- Date opened: 1875
- Capacity: 170,000
- Screened on: NBC (Kentucky Derby) FanDuel TV
- Course type: Flat; 1 mile (1.6 km)
- Notable races: Kentucky Derby; Kentucky Oaks; Turf Classic Stakes; Stephen Foster Stakes; Clark Stakes
- Churchill Downs
- U.S. National Register of Historic Places
- U.S. National Historic Landmark
- Location within Kentucky Location within the United States
- Built: 1875
- NRHP reference No.: 78001348

Significant dates
- Added to NRHP: November 15, 1978
- Designated NHL: 1986

Churchill Downs is a thoroughbred horse racing complex in Louisville, Kentucky, United States. Since its opening in 1875, it has hosted the annual Kentucky Derby, the first leg of the Triple Crown, as well as the Kentucky Oaks. The venue is named after the Churchill family, prominent in Kentucky for many years. Churchill Downs has also hosted the Breeders' Cup on nine occasions, most recently on November 2 and 3, 2018.

The racetrack is owned and operated by Churchill Downs Incorporated. With the infield open for the Kentucky Derby, the capacity of Churchill Downs is roughly 170,000.

In 2009 the Horseplayers Association of North America (HANA) introduced a rating system for 65 Thoroughbred racetracks in North America, which ranked Churchill Downs number 5 on its list. In 2014, prior to the start of their spring meet, Churchill Downs announced an increase in parimutuel takeout rates. As a result of the takeout increase, Churchill Downs ranked number 22 in that year's HANA Track Ratings.

== History ==
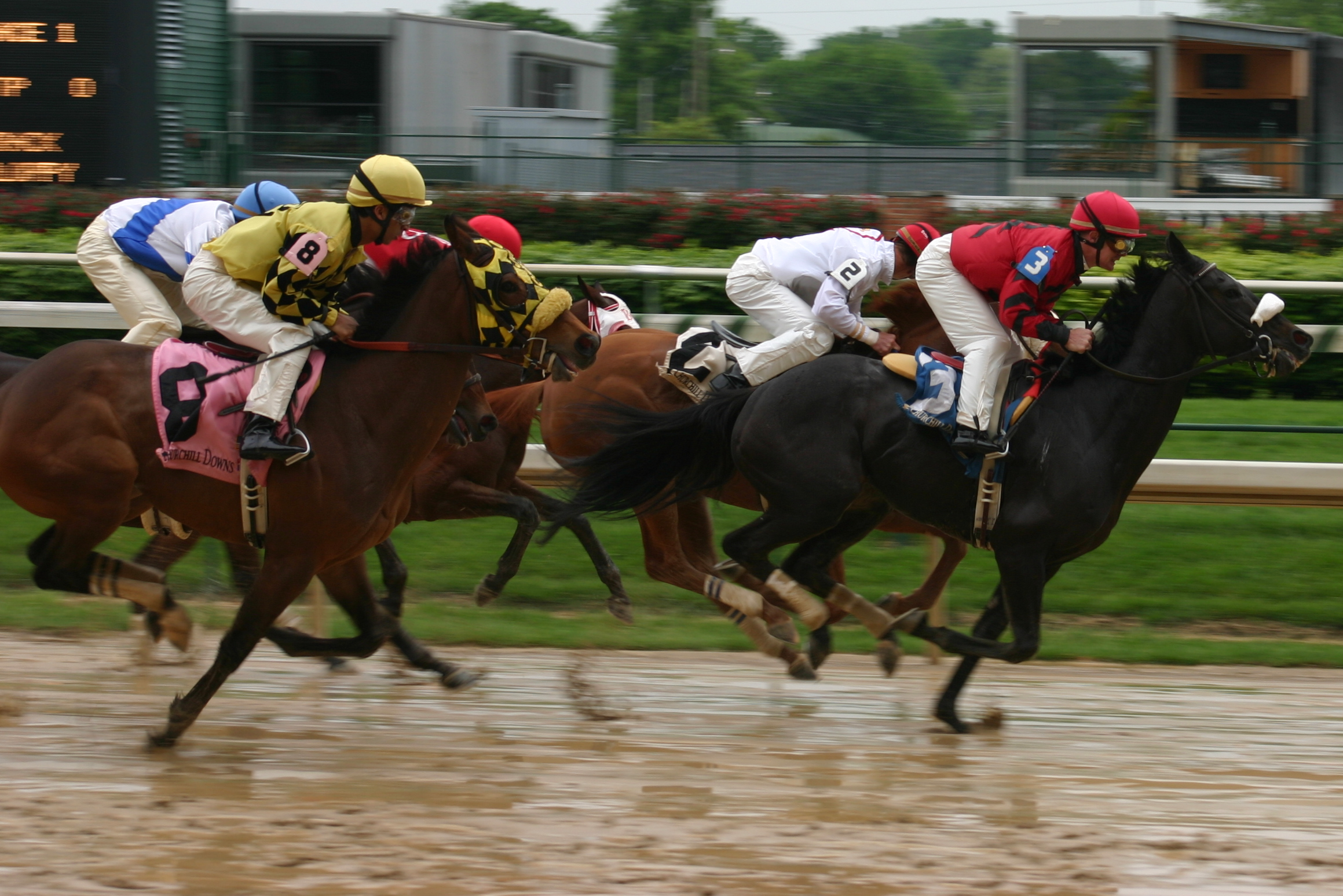
Thoroughbreds competing

The track, formally named Churchill Downs in 1883, is named for the locally prominent Churchill family, after John and Henry Churchill leased 80 acres (32 ha) of their land to their nephew, Colonel Meriwether Lewis Clark Jr. (grandson of explorer William Clark). Clark was president of the Louisville Jockey Club and Driving Park Association, which formed in 1875. His father-in-law, Richard Ten Broeck, was a horse breeder and trainer, and introduced Clark to horse racing, attending the English Derby at Epsom Downs outside London. Back in Louisville, Clark sought to build an upscale track like Epsom Downs, and include a signature race resembling the English Derby. Clark gathered 320 local sportsmen and business leaders to each invest $100 to fund a new racetrack and grandstand for the Louisville Jockey Club.

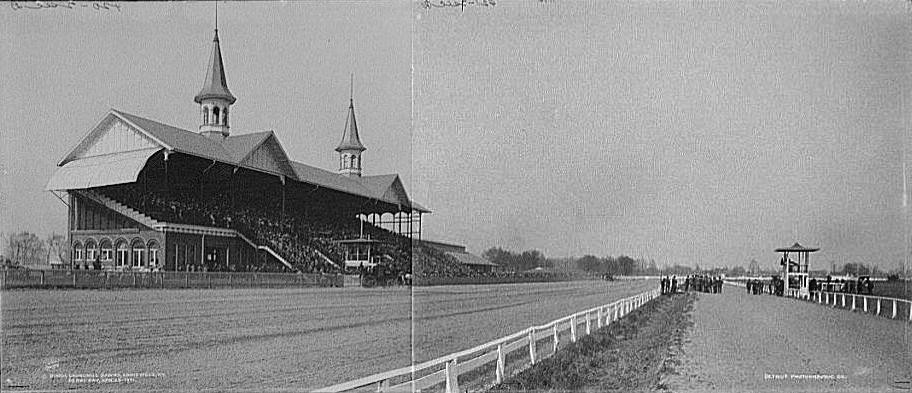
Composite image of Churchill Downs on Derby Day, 1902

Churchill Downs filled a void in Louisville left by the closing of Oakland and Woodlawn, two earlier race courses. The then-rural location was along Louisville and Nashville Railroad tracks, allowing for easy transport of horses. Clark, who preferred longer races to the relatively short ones that had become popular by the 1890s, was running short of funds, and in 1894 sold the track to a syndicate led by William E. Applegate. The new ownership instituted changes, such as commissioning the twin spire grandstand in 1895, shortening the length of the signature race to its modern 1 1/4 miles (2.0 km) in 1896, and adorning the winner of the Derby with a garland of roses, a tradition that also began in 1896.

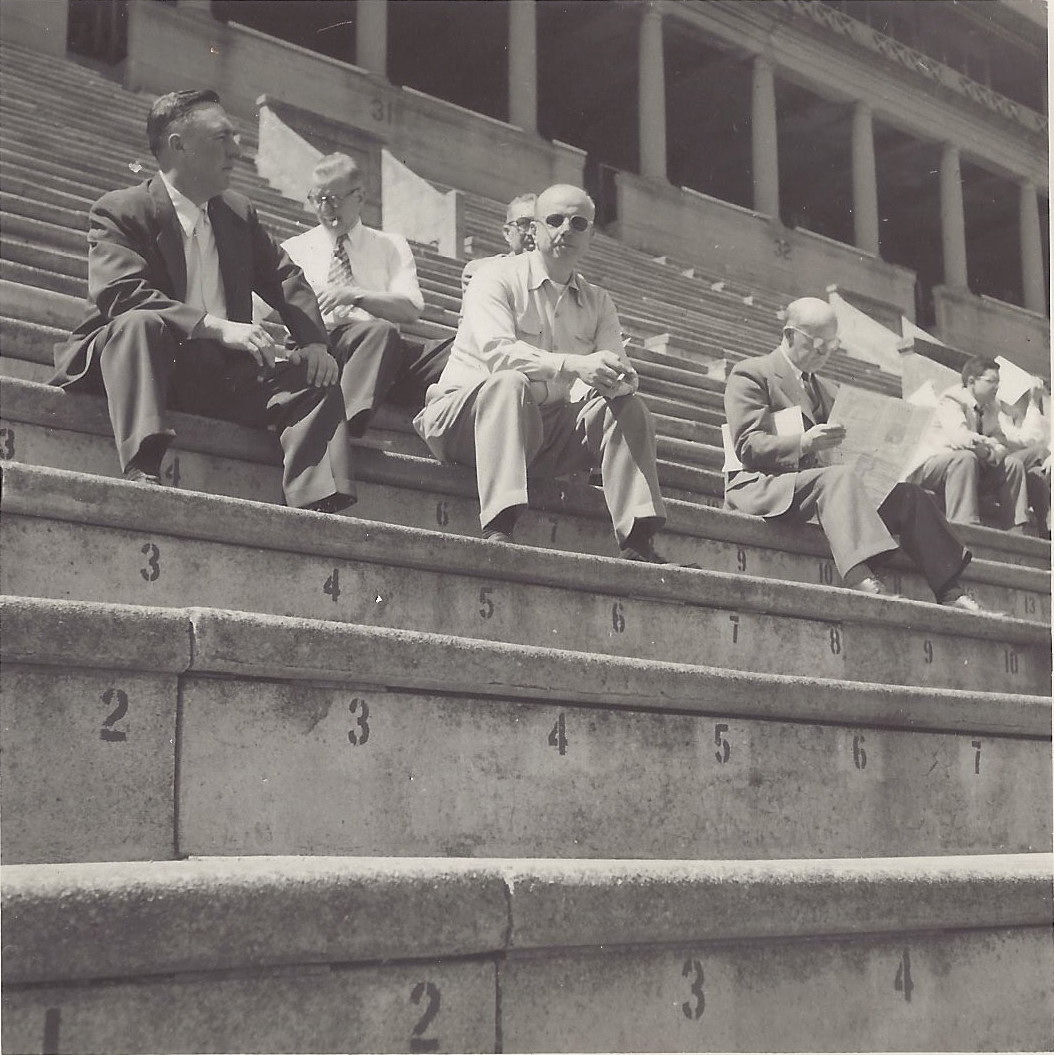
Gulf Oil executive and noted horse-racing enthusiast Willard F. Jones (second from left) in the stands as they were in 1951

In early 1902, Applegate, who had made his fortune as a bookmaker, turned over the day-to-day operation of the track to Charles F. Grainger, then the mayor of Louisville, in an effort to move Churchill Downs away from being primarily known for gambling. Among the new people Applegate brought on board to help him run the track was Col. Matt Winn of Louisville. Churchill Downs prospered and the Kentucky Derby then became the preeminent stakes race for three-year-old thoroughbred horses in North America.

During that early period, a new clubhouse was built in order to promote social interaction and new events such as steeplechases, automobile races and band concerts. The State Fair was held on the grounds, featuring the odd spectacle of two locomotives being intentionally crashed head-on in the infield.

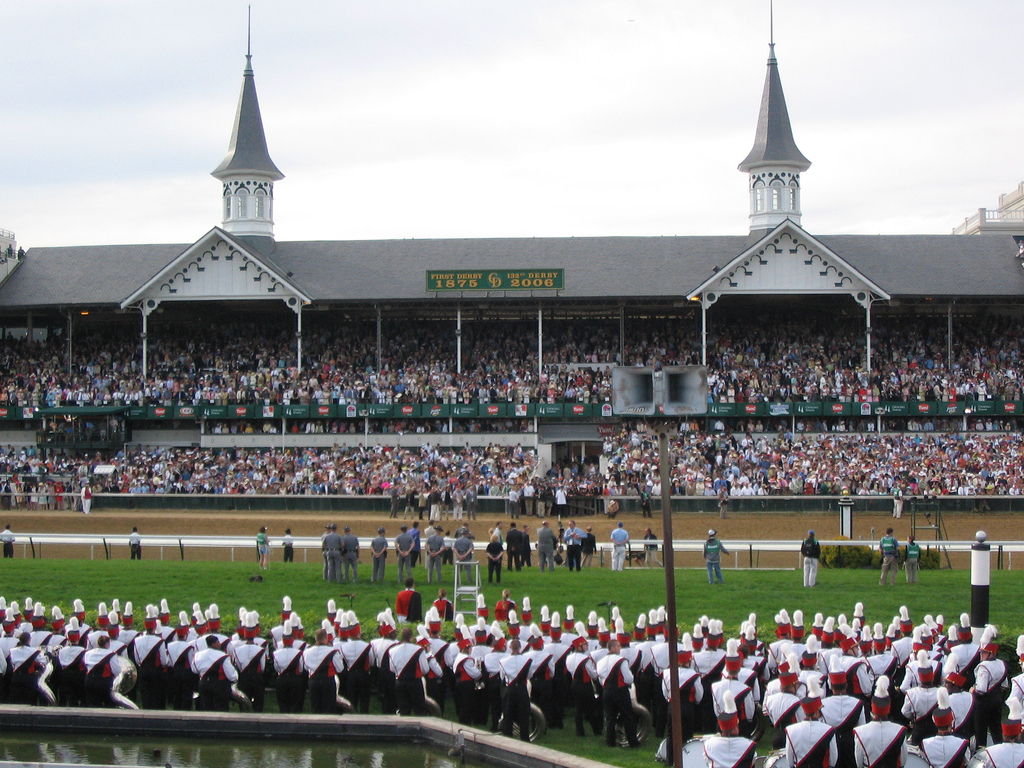
University of Louisville Marching Band in the foreground—during the 2006 Kentucky Derby

In 1908, parimutuel betting machines were introduced as gambling began to be less controversial again, and the wagering portion of the track's business became more profitable. Since then Churchill has expanded beyond traditional horse racing and has moved into online betting, and racing machines.

Churchill Downs was designated a National Historic Landmark in 1986.

On Friday, June 19, 2009, Churchill Downs hosted its first-ever night race with an attendance of over 28,000.

Churchill Downs ventured into the music business, organizing the inaugural HullabaLOU Music Festival, held on the weekend of July 23–25, 2010. The track had planned to make this an annual event to compete with other summer music festivals. HullabaLOU attracted 78,000 people but that fell short of the more than 100,000 expected by the company. The company attributed this to the brutal heat, but others cited high ticket prices in a poor economy. The entertainment division lost more than $5 million in its first year and was discontinued.

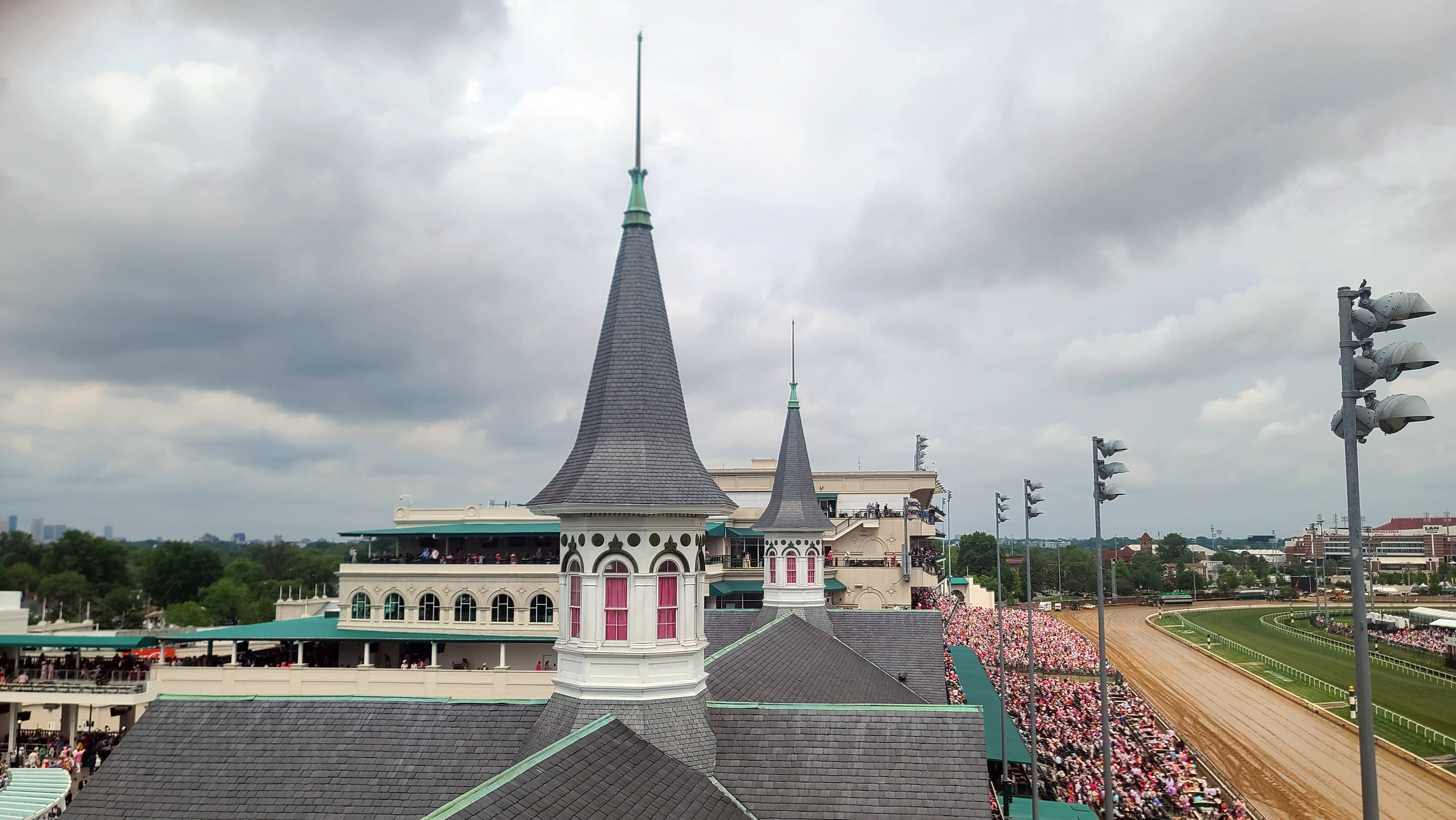
The iconic Twin Spires atop the Grandstand at Churchill Downs, adorned with pink for the 2024 Kentucky Oaks.

On Wednesday, June 22, 2011, an EF2 tornado hit the Louisville area, striking the stables and chapel at Churchill Downs, at EF1 intensity. Several stables were badly damaged, as was the chapel. Over 200 horses had to be evacuated from the damaged stables and be relocated to other stables that were not damaged by the tornado. The tornado did not cause any damage to the twin spires or the clubhouse.

Thurby is a portmanteau for Thursday plus Derby, and this name for the Thursday racing in Derby week has been recognized by Churchill Downs since 2014.

In June 2023, following the investigation by Kentucky Horse Racing Commission and Horseracing Integrity and Safety Authority over twelve horse fatalities since April 27, 2023, Churchill Downs transferred its spring-summer racing meet to Ellis Park Race Course in Henderson, Kentucky, while it re-evaluated its safety measures.

=== Graded events ===
The following Graded events were held at Churchill Downs in 2024 and 2025.

Grade I

- American Turf Stakes
- Churchill Downs Stakes
- Clark Stakes
- Derby City Distaff Stakes
- Kentucky Derby
- Kentucky Oaks
- La Troienne Stakes
- Stephen Foster Stakes
- Turf Classic Stakes

Grade II

- Alysheba Stakes
- Chicago Stakes
- Churchill Distaff Turf Mile Stakes
- Edgewood Stakes
- Eight Belles Stakes
- Falls City Stakes
- Fleur de Lis Stakes
- Golden Rod Stakes
- Kentucky Jockey Club Stakes
- Mrs. Revere Stakes
- Pat Day Mile Stakes
- Shawnee Stakes
- Twin Spires Turf Sprint Stakes
- Unbridled Sidney Stakes
- Wise Dan Stakes

Grade III

- Ack Ack Stakes
- Arlington Stakes
- Blame Stakes
- Chilukki Stakes
- Commonwealth Turf Stakes
- Dogwood Stakes
- Iroquois Stakes
- Kelly's Landing Stakes
- Louisville Stakes
- Lukas Classic Stakes
- Matt Winn Stakes
- Mamzelle Stakes
- Maxfield Stakes
- Mint Julep Stakes
- Modesty Stakes
- Pocahontas Stakes
- Pucker Up Stakes
- Regret Stakes
- River City Stakes
- Street Sense Stakes
- Winning Colors Stakes

== Facilities ==
Churchill Downs front entrance gate

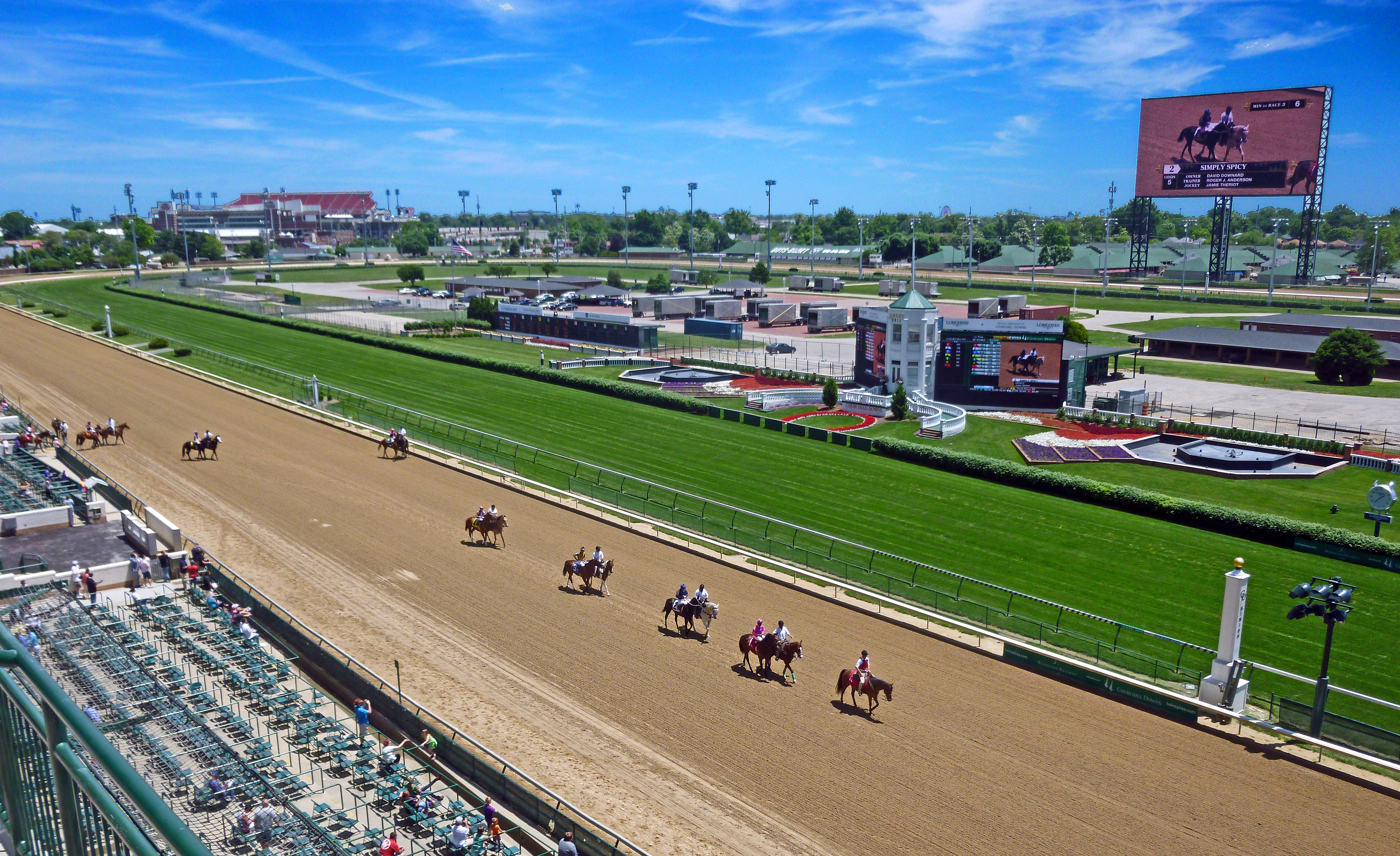
Churchill Downs, spring meet 2014

The twin spires atop the grandstands are the most recognizable architectural feature of Churchill Downs and are used as a symbol of the track and the Derby. They were designed by the Louisville architectural firm D.X. Murphy & Bro. who were prolific in the city, markedly so for their philanthropic work with the Catholic Church. Today, Churchill Downs covers 147 acres (59 ha). The usual number of people seated at the derby is 50,000 people, though crowds can reach over 150,000 on Derby day. The dirt oval main track, on which the Derby is run, is one mile (1.6 km) in circumference and is 79–80 feet (24.1–24.4 m) wide, with a 120-foot-wide (37 m) section for the starting gate. A turf track, inside the main track, is 7/8 mile (1.4 km) in circumference and 80-foot (24 m) wide. The elevation of the track is approximately 450 feet (135 m) above sea level.

From 2001 to 2005, Churchill Downs underwent a three-and-a-half year, $121 million renovation. The clubhouse was replaced, 79 luxury suites were added, and the twin spires were refurbished. One of the additions in the clubhouse was a 36-foot (11 m) mural by Pierre Bellocq depicting all 96 jockeys to win the Kentucky Derby from 1875 to 2004. In summer 2008 the same artist added another mural depicting all of the trainers and updating the Jockey's painting, adding Calvin Borel and Edgar Prado to it. These updates are done yearly to accommodate new winning trainers and jockeys. The new design has been somewhat controversial since the new suites block full view of the spires from most angles.

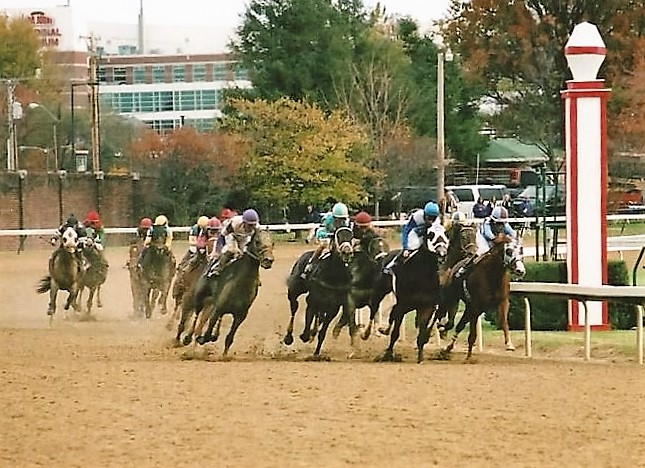
Churchill Downs has hosted the Breeders' Cup eight times during the fall meet

Racing at Churchill Downs occurs in three meets though for the majority of its existence there were only two meets per year. The spring meet starts one week before the Derby and continues until early July. The Kentucky Derby is held the first Saturday in May and the Kentucky Oaks is run on the Friday before the Derby. A fall meet picks up in late October and closes Thanksgiving weekend in late November. Night races were established in 2009. A third meet in September was added in 2013.

In addition to the track, clubhouse and stables, Churchill Downs also contains the Kentucky Derby Museum which focuses on the history of the Kentucky Derby and Churchill Downs. The museum also contains a number of exhibits exploring the training and racing of thoroughbred horses. It includes a 360-degree cinema that shows the short film The Greatest Race, a documentary about the Kentucky Derby. The museum is normally open year-round.

In October 2013, Churchill Downs began installing a new, ultra high-definition video board built by Panasonic, which became operational in time for the 2014 Kentucky Derby. Called "The Big Board", it measures 171 feet (52 m) wide and 90 feet (27 m) high, with the bottom edge 80 feet (24 m) off the ground, and weighs 1,200,000 pounds (540 t). It was constructed along the outside of the backstretch of the dirt course facing the grandstand and infield. At the time, it was the largest ultra high-definition video board ever constructed. At the same time, 750 speakers were installed around the track.

Churchill Downs has had several renovation projects since the early 2010s. A new grandstand on the clubhouse turn, the First Turn Club, was completed and opened before the 2023 Kentucky Derby with capacity for more than 7,000 people. The following year, before the 150th Kentucky Derby, a new $200 million paddock was opened. This new paddock also featuring past derby winners around with the number they wore as well as the year they won.

In February 2025 track management announced two new projects: a reconstructed grandstand between the finish line and the First Turn Club with capacity for over 13,000 people, and new permanent structures on the infield facing the homestretch. Two months later Churchill Downs announced that these construction projects, estimated to cost nearly US$1 billion, would be postponed because of "increasing uncertainty surrounding construction costs" due to tariffs and trade disputes. At the same time, management announced renovations to the Finish Line suites and Trophy Room, estimated to cost $25–30 million, that are expected to be completed before the 2026 Kentucky Derby.

== People associated with Churchill Downs ==
=== Chief executive officers ===
From 1875 through 2019, Churchill Downs has had 12 CEOs.

- M. Lewis Clark 1875–1894
- William F. Schulte 1895–1901
- Charles F. Grainger 1902–1917
- Johnson N. Camden Jr. 1918–1927
- Samuel Culbertson 1928–1937
- Matt Winn 1938–1949
- Bill Corum 1950–1958
- Wathen Knebelkamp 1959–1970
- Lynn Stone 1970–1984
- Thomas H. Meeker 1984–2006
- Robert L. Evans 2006–2014
- William C. Carstanjen 2014–present

=== Track announcers ===
- Gene Schmidt (1940–1960)
- Chic Anderson (1961–1977)
- Mike Battaglia (1978–1996, 2013 as a one-day fill-in; 2014 as a fill-in for Breeders Cup Weekend)
- Kurt Becker (1997–1998)
- Luke Kruytbosch (1999–2008)
- Bobby Neuman (October 26 – November 2, 2008)
- Michael Wrona (November 12–16, 2008)
- John Asher (November 16, 2008)
- Mark Johnson (November 26–29, 2008; 2009–2013)
- Larry Collmus (November 19–23, 2008; 2014)
- Bill Downes (2014 as a fill-in)
- Travis Stone (November 5–9, 2008; 2015–present)

=== TV personalities ===
- John Asher (1997–1998 the paddock show, CD Today a handicapping show 2007–2018)
- Mike Battaglia (1997–2007 full-time, 2008–? as an occasional fill-in. Also the Tracks Morning Line Odds-Maker since 1974.)
- Donna Barton Brothers (1999–2002)
- Jill Byrne (2004–2007 fill-in, 2008–2014)
- Jessica Pacheco (2007 Derby week)
- Joanne Jones (2007 Derby week)
- Joe Kristufek (2015–present full-time)
- Kaitlin Free (2021–present)
- Tony Calo (2024–present)
- Kevin Kilroy (2024–present)

== See also ==
- Kentucky Derby top four finishers
- Kentucky Oaks top three finishers
- List of attractions and events in the Louisville metropolitan area
- Road to the Kentucky Derby
- Road to the Kentucky Oaks
