= Yibir (horse) =

British Thoroughbred racehorse

- Racing silks of Godolphin
- Sire: Dubawi
- Grandsire: Dubai Millennium
- Dam: Rumh
- Damsire: Monsun
- Sex: Gelding
- Foaled: 14 April 2018
- Country: United Kingdom
- Colour: Chestnut
- Breeder: Godolphin
- Owner: Godolphin
- Trainer: Charlie Appleby
- Record: 17: 7-3-3
- Earnings: £3,143,568

Major wins
- Haynes, Hanson & Clark Stakes (2020); Bahrain Trophy (2021); Great Voltigeur Stakes (2021); Jockey Club Derby (2021); Breeders' Cup Turf (2021); Princess of Wales's Stakes (2022); Coral Marathon (2023)

Awards
- American Champion Male Turf Horse (2021)
- Last updated on 21 June 2023

Yibir (foaled 14 April 2018) is a Champion British Thoroughbred racehorse. He showed considerable promise as a juvenile in 2020 when he won two of his four races including the Haynes, Hanson & Clark Stakes. He was beaten in his first three starts as a three-year-old and was subsequently gelded. On his return to the track he improved to become a top-class turf performer, winning the Bahrain Trophy, Great Voltigeur Stakes, Jockey Club Derby and Breeders' Cup Turf. Yibir was awarded the Eclipse Award for US Champion Male Turf Horse.

== Background ==
Yibir is a chestnut gelding with a white sock on his left foreleg who was bred and owned by Sheikh Mohammed's Godolphin organisation. He was sent into training with Charlie Appleby, whose stable is based at Newmarket, Suffolk, but typically relocates to Dubai in winter.

He was sired by Dubawi a top-class son of Dubai Millennium, whose wins included the Irish 2,000 Guineas and the Prix Jacques Le Marois. At stud, Dubawi has been a highly-successful breeding stallion, siring major winners such as Monterosso, Al Kazeem, Makfi, Lucky Nine and Night of Thunder. Yibir's dam Rumh was a German mare who won four races in England including the Listed Ballymacoll Stud Stakes. She was a descendant of the Irish mare Le Melody (foaled 1971), the dam of Ardross and the female-line ancestor of Electrocutionist and Scorpion. Rumh had previously produce Yibir's full-sister Wild Illusion.

== Racing career ==
=== 2020: two-year-old season ===
Yibir began his racing career in a novice race (for horses with no more than two previous wins) over seven furlongs on soft ground at Newmarket Racecourse on 18 June and started the 11/8 favourite. He hung badly to the right for most of the race and came home third of the four runners behind his less fancied stablemate Master of the Seas, beaten more than ten lengths by the winner. On 10 July at the same track he led for most of the way in a seven furlong maiden race but was outpaced in the closing stages and finished fifth behind Youth Spirit. James Doyle took the ride when the colt started 13/8 favourite for a maiden over the same distance at Sandown Park and recorded his first success as he led from the start and kept on "gamely" to win by three quarters of a length from King Vega. On his final run of the year Yibir was ridden by William Buick when he started 5/2 second favourite behind the John Gosden-trained Megallan in the Haynes, Hanson & Clark Stakes over one mile at Newbury Racecourse on 18 September. He took the lead soon after the start and "kept on strongly" to beat Megallan by a length. After the race Buick said "He is a big horse, but he has done nothing wrong and is learning on the job. Today he has come forward again. It was nice ground here today and stepping up to a mile has suited him. He is the type of horse, looking at him, that whatever he does this year, he will do better next year".

=== 2021: three-year-old season ===
==== Spring ====
For his first appearance as a three-year-old, Yibir was stepped up in class and distance for the Group 3 bet365 Classic Trial over ten furlongs at Sandown on 23 April when he started the 4/1 second choice in a ten-runner field. He led for most of the way before being overtaken by Alenquer in the straight and lost second place to his stablemate Adayar in the final strides. In the Listed Dee Stakes at Chester Racecourse two weeks later he started favourite but came home fourth behind El Drama after racing "awkwardly" and hanging to the left in the last quarter mile. On 21 May in the Cocked Hat Stakes over eleven furlongs at Goodwood Racecourse he raced in second place for most of the race but hung to the right in the last quarter mile and was beaten four lengths by Lone Eagle. Shortly after the race Yibir was gelded.

==== Summer ====
Yibir returned to the track at Newmarket on 8 July when he started 6/4 favourite for the Group 3 Bahrain Trophy over thirteen furlongs. Ridden by Doyle he was restrained towards the rear of the five-runner field before moving up to take the lead approaching the final furlong and won "readily" by two and a half lengths. Charlie Appleby commented "This horse, as we have learnt this spring, is a great traveller. We have always just felt he's looked a bit more awkward in the last furlong of his races. He has been gelded since his last start. Would I say it has changed his homework? No because he has always been a good work horse. We were confident coming into today if we could ride him cold I felt he had the class that he could take himself there comfortably enough that we didn’t have to ask too much at the business end and that is what he showed today."

The gelding's next start was the Group 3 Gordon Stakes at Goodwood later that month when he fought against Buick's attempts to restrain him and after taking the lead five furlongs out faded badly in the closing stages and came home sixth behind Ottoman Emperor, beaten more than eight lengths by the winner. On 18 August Yibir was ridden by Doyle when he started at odds of 6/1 for the Group 2 Great Voltigeur Stakes over one and a half miles at York Racecourse. High Definition (the beaten favourite in the Irish Derby) headed the betting, while the other six contenders included Scope, Youth Spirit, Kemari (Queen's Vase) and Third Realm (Lingfield Derby Trial). Racing in a hood, Yibir settled towards the rear as The Mediterranean set the pace, before moving up to take the lead approaching the final furlong and won by one and a quarter lengths. After the race Appleby said "We've had our quirks with him – he's been gelded and we've had the hood on and the hood off... He's got a lot of potential and it's just about trying to get him on his right day. His constitution is a credit to himself as he's had plenty of racing and doesn't miss out in the mornings... he'll up for a bit of travelling and we'll have a bit of fun with him".

==== Autumn ====
For his next race Yibir was sent to the United States to contest the $1 million Jockey Club Derby Invitational Stakes over one and a half miles on firm ground at Belmont Park on 18 September. Ridden by Jamie Spencer he went off the 2.65/1 second choice in the betting behind the Belmont Derby winner Bolshoi Ballet in a seven-runner field which also included Soldier Rising (runner-up in the Saratoga Derby) and Tokyo Gold (Derby Italiano). After starting slowly and settling at the rear of the field he moved into contention on the outside on the final turn. He took the lead inside the last quarter mile and despite hanging to the left in the closing stages he kept on well to win by two and a half lengths from Soldier Rising. Jamie Spencer said "I was confident going in. He ran a good race and fared well in the stretch. I'm happy with his performance today. He's a nice horse and it was a good trip."

Yibir was sent back to the United States to contest the Breeders' Cup Turf at Del Mar Racetrack on 6 November, when he was matched against older horses for the first time and started at odds of 8.5/1 in a fourteen-runner field. Tarnawa started favourite while the other contenders included Teona, Japan, Broome, Walton Street (Canadian International Stakes), Gufo (Sword Dancer Stakes), Tribhuvan (United Nations Stakes), Rockemperor (Joe Hirsch Turf Classic Stakes), Sisfahan (Deutsches Derby) and Channel Maker (Man o' War Stakes). Yibir pulled hard against Buick's to restrain him in the early stages as Tribhuvan set the pace from Acclimate, but began to make progress and was switched to the outside entering the final turn. Broome went to the front in the straight and opened up a clear lead but Yibir produced a strong late run to gain the advantage in the final strides and won by half a length. William Buick commented "Halfway around the home turn I could see Broome had gone, but I was always confident of picking him up. [Yibir has] an amazing turn of foot and I couldn't pull him up after the line. Amazing horse, and I think he did something today that not many horses can do, so all credit to him."

=== 2022: four-year-old season ===
Yibir travelled to the United Arab Emirates in March and ran in the Group 1 Dubai Sheema Classic over 2,400 metres at Meydan Racecourse starting as the 7/2 favourite and finishing a close second, beaten a neck by Shahryar after rallying from the rear of the field.

Returning to England, on 29 April Yibir ran in the Group 2 Jockey Club Stakes over the mile-and-one-half distance where started as the hot 1/4 odds-on favourite in a field of five runners and was beaten by 1 3/4 lengths by the Irish-bred Living Legend.

Connections sent Yibir to the United States in mid May where he faced four other runners in the Grade I Man o' War Stakes at Belmont Park. Starting as the 1/2 odds-on favourite Yibir broke from the gate poorly was a good five lengths last leaving the straight for the first time. Although Yibir made a strong run rounding the last turn and battled on well to the finishing line he finished third to 18/1 longshot Highland Chief. Charlie Appleby said after the race, "The turf was a little bit on the slower side of where he likes to hear his feet rattle. It blunted his acceleration slightly, but you can't take anything away from the winner."

== Pedigree ==
Pedigree of Yibir (GB), chestnut gelding, 2018
Sire Dubawi (IRE) 2002	Dubai Millennium (GB); 1996	Seeking the Gold (USA)	Mr. Prospector
Sire Dubawi (IRE) 2002	Dubai Millennium (GB); 1996	Seeking the Gold (USA)	Con Game
Sire Dubawi (IRE) 2002	Dubai Millennium (GB); 1996	Colorado Dancer (IRE)	Shareef Dancer (USA)
Sire Dubawi (IRE) 2002	Dubai Millennium (GB); 1996	Colorado Dancer (IRE)	Fall Aspen (USA)
Sire Dubawi (IRE) 2002	Zomaradah (GB); 1995	Deploy	Shirley Heights
Sire Dubawi (IRE) 2002	Zomaradah (GB); 1995	Deploy	Slightly Dangerous (USA)
Sire Dubawi (IRE) 2002	Zomaradah (GB); 1995	Jawaher (IRE)	Dancing Brave (USA)
Sire Dubawi (IRE) 2002	Zomaradah (GB); 1995	Jawaher (IRE)	High Tern
Dam Rumh (GER) 2008	Monsun (GER); 1990	Königsstuhl	Dschingis Khan
Dam Rumh (GER) 2008	Monsun (GER); 1990	Königsstuhl	Koningskronung
Dam Rumh (GER) 2008	Monsun (GER); 1990	Mosella	Surumu
Dam Rumh (GER) 2008	Monsun (GER); 1990	Mosella	Monasia
Dam Rumh (GER) 2008	Royal Dubai (GER); 2000	Dashing Blade (GB)	Elegant Air
Dam Rumh (GER) 2008	Royal Dubai (GER); 2000	Dashing Blade (GB)	Sharp Castan
Dam Rumh (GER) 2008	Royal Dubai (GER); 2000	Reem Dubai (IRE)	Nashwan (USA)
Dam Rumh (GER) 2008	Royal Dubai (GER); 2000	Reem Dubai (IRE)	Gesedeh (Family 23)
