= Nations Pride =

Irish-bred Thoroughbred racehorse

- Racing silks of Godolphin
- Sire: Teofilo (IRE)
- Grandsire: Galileo (IRE)
- Dam: Important Time (IRE)
- Damsire: Oasis Dream (GB)
- Sex: Colt
- Foaled: 28 April 2019
- Country: Ireland
- Color: Bay
- Breeder: Godolphin
- Owner: Godolphin
- Trainer: Charlie Appleby
- Record: 23: 11 - 3 - 3
- Earnings: US$$3,789,286

Major wins
- Newmarket Stakes (2022); Saratoga Derby (2022); Jockey Club Derby Invitational (2022); Dubai Millennium Stakes (2023); Bayerisches Zuchtrennen (2023); Canadian International (2023); Arlington Million (2024); Singspiel Stakes (UAE) (2025)
- Last updated on 15 August 2025

Nations Pride (foaled 28 April 2019) is a multiple graded stakes race winning Irish-bred British-trained Thoroughbred racehorse. As a three-year-old in 2022 he was victorious in three countries, United Arab Emirates, the United Kingdom and United States. In 2023 he won in the United Arab Emirates, Germany and Canada.

== Background ==
Nations Pride is a bay colt bred and owned by Sheikh Mohammed's Godolphin organization. He was sent into training with Charlie Appleby at Godolphin's British base in Newmarket, Suffolk.

He was from the eleventh crop of foals sired by Teofilo, who was undefeated champion as a two-year-old. At stud, Teofilo has been a highly successful breeding stallion, shuttling to Australia, siring major winners such as Exultant in Hong Kong, Happy Clapper, Humidor and the sire of two Melbourne Cup winners, Twilight Payment and Cross Counter in Australia. Nations Pride became Teofilo's 23rd top-level winner. Teofilo stood at Kildangan Stud for €30,000 in Ireland in 2021.

Nations Pride's dam Important Time raced twelve times and won three times with her most important victory in the Listed Stutenpreis des Gestuts Winterhauch over 1850 metres (~1 mile 1 furlong 43 yards) at Cologne in Germany.

In the United States, Nations Pride captured two legs of the New York Racing Association Turf Trinity, the Grade I Saratoga Derby and the Grade III Jockey Club Derby Invitational Stakes and was second in the Grade I Belmont Derby.

== Statistics ==
Date	Distance	Race	Group Grade	Track	Odds	Field	Finish	Time	Winning (Losing) Margin	Jockey	Ref
2021 – Two-year-old season
15 Sep 2021	7 furlongs 3 yards	Maiden Stakes		Yarmouth	5/2	8	2	1:26.07	(2 1/2 lengths)	William Buick	
4 Oct 2021	1 mile 1 yard	Novice Stakes		Lingfield	1/3*	6	1	1:37.09	4 3/4 lengths	William Buick	
6 Nov 2021	1 1/4 miles	Conditions Stakes		Chelmsford	2/9*	4	1	2:07.62	3 lengths	Adam Kirby	
2022 – Three-year-old season
25 Feb 2022	2000 metres (Note: Distance for the event was approximately 1 1/4 miles)	Jumeirah Derby		Meydan (UAE)	N/A (Note: Nations Pride final odds with British bookmakers were 11/8 favourite since gambling is prohibited in the United Arab Emirates)	8	1	2:01.72	3 3/4 lengths	James Doyle	
29 Apr 2022	1 1/4 miles	Newmarket Stakes	Listed	Newmarket	7/4	4	1	2:05.73	7 lengths	William Buick	
4 Jun 2022	1m 4f 6y	Epsom Derby (Note: In 2022 the event was formally held as the Cazoo Derby in Memory Of Lester Piggott)	I	Epsom Downs	15/2	17	8	2:36.38	(13 1/2 lengths)	William Buick	
9 Jul 2022	1 1/4 miles	Belmont Derby	I	Belmont Park	2.40*	12	2	1:59.99	(3/4 length)	Frankie Dettori	
6 Aug 2022	1 3/16 miles	Saratoga Derby	I	Saratoga	2.10*	10	1	1:54.72	1 3/4 lengths	William Buick	
17 Sep 2022	1 1/2 miles	Jockey Club Derby	III	Aqueduct	0.55*	6	1	2:24.14 (Note: Nations Pride set a new track record for the 1 1/2 miles on the Inner Turf Track at Aqueduct)	6 1/4 lengths	Frankie Dettori	
6 Nov 2022	1 1/2 miles	Breeders' Cup Turf	I	Keeneland	2.91*	13	5	2:26.35 (Note: The winner of the Breeders' Cup Turf, Rebel's Romance set a new track record for the distance)	(3 3/4 lengths)	William Buick	
2023 – Four-year-old season
17 Feb 2023	2000 metres (Note: Distance for the event was approximately 1 1/4 miles)	Dubai Millennium Stakes	III	Meydan (UAE)	N/A (Note: Nations Pride final odds with British bookmakers were 11/8 favourite since gambling is prohibited in the United Arab Emirates)	12	1	2:01.16	1 1/4 lengths	William Buick	
25 Mar 2023	1800 metres (Note: Distance for the event was approximately 1 1/8 miles)	Dubai Turf	I	Meydan (UAE)	N/A (Note: Nations Pride final odds with British bookmakers were 5/1 since gambling is prohibited in the United Arab Emirates)	14	3	1:47.39	(1 length)	William Buick	
30 Jul 2023	2000 metres (Note: Distance for the event was approximately 1 1/4 miles)	Bayerisches Zuchtrennen	I	Munich Racecourse	9/5	6	1	2:15.02	3 lengths	William Buick	
8 Oct 2023	1 1/4 miles	Canadian International	I	Woodbine	0.40*	8	1	2:03.65	2 1/4 lengths	William Buick	
17 Nov 2023	2000 metres	Bahrain International Trophy	II	Sakhir (BAH)	N/A (Note: Gambling is prohibited in Bahrain)	14	7	2:06.82	(4 lengths)	William Buick	
2024 – Five-year-old season
11 May 2024	1 3/8 miles	Man o' War Stakes	II	Aqueduct	0.90*	9	3	2:13.80	(4 3/4 lengths)	Frankie Dettori	
8 Jun 2024	1 3/16 miles	Manhattan Stakes	I	Saratoga	5.90	8	2	1:51.94	(2 lengths)	Frankie Dettori	
11 Aug 2024	1 1/4 miles	Arlington Million	I	Colonial Downs	1.00*	6	1	2:01.96	1 3/4 lengths	William Buick	
15 Nov 2024	2000 metres	Bahrain International Trophy	II	Sakhir (BAH)	N/A (Note: Gambling is prohibited in Bahrain)	12	10	2:02.28	(20 1/2 lengths)	William Buick	
2025 – Six-year-old season
25 Jan 2025	1 1/8 miles	Pegasus World Cup Turf	I	Gulfstream Park	2.50*	12	9	1:44.50	(5 lengths)	William Buick	
1 Mar 2025	1800 metres (Note: Distance for the event was approximately 1 1/8 miles)	Singspiel Stakes	II	Meydan (UAE)	N/A (Note: Nations Pride final odds with British bookmakers were 5/2 second favourite since gambling is prohibited in the United Arab Emirates)	8	1	1:47.24	1 1/4 lengths	William Buick	
5 Apr 2025	1800 metres (Note: Distance for the event was approximately 1 1/8 miles)	Dubai Turf	I	Meydan (UAE)	N/A (Note: Nations Pride final odds with British bookmakers were 11/1 since gambling is prohibited in the United Arab Emirates)	11	10	1:45.84	(5 3/4 lengths)	William Buick	
9 Aug 2025	1 1/2 miles	Sword Dancer Stakes	I	Saratoga	3.65	8	3	2:25.04	(1 3/4 lengths)	William Buick	

Legend:
All Weather Track Turf
Notes:
An (*) asterisk after the odds means Nations Pride was the post-time favourite.

== Pedigree ==
Pedigree of Nations Pride, bay colt, 28 April 2019
Sire Teofilo (IRE) (2004)	Galileo (IRE) (1998)	Sadler's Wells (1981)	Northern Dancer (Canada) (1961)
Sire Teofilo (IRE) (2004)	Galileo (IRE) (1998)	Sadler's Wells (1981)	Fairy Bridge (1975)
Sire Teofilo (IRE) (2004)	Galileo (IRE) (1998)	Urban Sea (1989)	Miswaki (1978)
Sire Teofilo (IRE) (2004)	Galileo (IRE) (1998)	Urban Sea (1989)	Allegretta (GB) (1978)
Sire Teofilo (IRE) (2004)	Speirbhean (IRE) (1998)	Danehill (1986)	Danzig (1977)
Sire Teofilo (IRE) (2004)	Speirbhean (IRE) (1998)	Danehill (1986)	Razyana (1981)
Sire Teofilo (IRE) (2004)	Speirbhean (IRE) (1998)	Saviour (1987)	Majestic Light (1973)
Sire Teofilo (IRE) (2004)	Speirbhean (IRE) (1998)	Saviour (1987)	Victorian Queen (1971)
Dam Important Time (IRE) (2011)	Oasis Dream (GB) (2000)	Green Desert (1983)	Danzig (1977)
Dam Important Time (IRE) (2011)	Oasis Dream (GB) (2000)	Green Desert (1983)	Foreign Courier (1979)
Dam Important Time (IRE) (2011)	Oasis Dream (GB) (2000)	Hope (IRE) (1991)	Dancing Brave (1983)
Dam Important Time (IRE) (2011)	Oasis Dream (GB) (2000)	Hope (IRE) (1991)	Bahamian (IRE) (1985)
Dam Important Time (IRE) (2011)	Satwa Queen (FR) (2002)	Muhtathir (GB) (1995)	Elmaamul (1987)
Dam Important Time (IRE) (2011)	Satwa Queen (FR) (2002)	Muhtathir (GB) (1995)	Majmu (1988)
Dam Important Time (IRE) (2011)	Satwa Queen (FR) (2002)	Tolga (1982)	Irish River (FR) (1976)
Dam Important Time (IRE) (2011)	Satwa Queen (FR) (2002)	Tolga (1982)	Light of Realm (IRE) (1977) (family 10)

- Nations Pride is inbred 4s × 4d to Danzig.
