= Soaring Softly =

American-bred Thoroughbred racehorse

Soaringly Softly
- Sire: Kris S.
- Grandsire: Roberto
- Dam: Wings of Grace
- Damsire: Key to the Mint
- Sex: Mare
- Foaled: 1995
- Country: United States
- Colour: Chestnut
- Breeder: Phillips Racing Partnership
- Owner: Galbreath/Phillips Racing Partnership
- Trainer: James J. Toner
- Record: 16: 9-1-3
- Earnings: US$1,270,433

Major wins
- Vineland Handicap (1999); Sheepshead Bay Handicap (1999); New York Handicap (1999); Flower Bowl Invitational Stakes (1999) Breeders' Cup wins: Breeders' Cup Filly & Mare Turf (1999)

Awards
- American Champion Female Turf Horse (1999)

Honours
- Grade III Soaring Softly Stakes (2016– ) at Belmont Park
- Last updated on 30 May 2022

Soaring Softly (1995 in Kentucky – 2015) was an American Thoroughbred racehorse whose biggest win came in the 1999 Breeders' Cup Filly & Mare Turf. She originally raced on dirt, with limited success. Switched to turf at age four, she won seven of eight starts and was named the American Champion Female Turf Horse.

== Background ==
Soaring Softly was bred and raced by Joan Phillips and her son John of the renowned Darby Dan Farm. Her sire is Darby Dan's outstanding stallion Kris S., a son of the Darby Dan European star grass racer Roberto. Her dam is the farm's own mare Wings of Grace, who was a daughter of the 1972 American Champion 3-Year-Old Colt, Key to the Mint. Wings of Grace is from the family of Softly, one of Darby Dan's most influential broodmares.

== Racing career ==
=== At age two ===
Soaring Softly was conditioned for racing by Jimmy Toner. She made her racing debut at age two on October 18, 1997, with a third-place finish in a seven-furlong event for maidens on the dirt track at Belmont Park in Elmont, New York. She won her second and final start of the year in a one-mile event for maidens at Aqueduct Racetrack on November 11.

=== At age three ===
Soaring Softly made six starts at age three, winning her first outing on April 24, 1998, at Keeneland Race Course in Lexington, Kentucky. She then returned to Belmont Park for the June 7 Grade 1 Acorn Stakes, in which she finished fourth behind winner Jersey Girl. She then finished sixth in the June 27 Mother Goose Stakes, again won by Jersey Girl. Soaring Softly did not start again until November, when she returned to competing in allowance races at Aqueduct Racetrack, earning two third-place finishes in mile events. In her final start of 1998, on December 5, Soaring Softly ran second in a mile and a sixteenth allowance race.

=== At age four, a Champion on turf ===
Wintered in Florida, after she won just one minor race in six starts on dirt in 1998, Soaring Softly's handlers made the decision to test her on the turf course at Gulfstream Park. The result was instant success that ended with a Championship year. Soaring Softly won her first five starts of the year, including the Sheepshead Bay Handicap and New York Handicap, before finishing fifth in the Diana Handicap at Saratoga Race Course in early September. Then, under new jockey Jerry Bailey, she won the Grade 1 Flower Bowl Invitational Handicap at Belmont Park, notably defeating runner-up Coretta. She capped off the year with her seventh win in eight starts, gaining a second straight victory over Coretta in the mile and three-eighths Breeders' Cup Filly & Mare Turf, hosted that year by Gulfstream Park. She was voted the 1999 American Champion Female Turf Horse.

After developing a tissue strain that would have required therapy and a lengthy recovery, Soaring Softly was retired from racing.

== Retirement ==
As a broodmare, Soaring Softly was bred to top class stallions such as Storm Cat, Gone West, Seeking The Gold and Distorted Humor. She produced seven foals between 2001 and 2008, one of which have met with much success in racing. After failing to deliver a live foal for the next several years, she underwent a Caesarian section in 2013. The resulting foal, named Manitoulin, was raised by a nurse mare and went on to become a graded stakes winner.

Soaring Softly died in a paddock accident in September, 2015, at the age of 20. The Soaring Softly Stakes at Belmont Park is named in her honor.
