= Jockey Club Oaks Invitational Stakes =

- Class: Grade III
- Location: Belmont Park; Elmont, New York, United States
- Inaugurated: 2019
- Website: NYRA

Race information
- Distance: 1 3/8 miles
- Surface: Turf
- Track: Left-handed
- Qualification: Three-year-old fillies
- Weight: 122 lbs.
- Purse: US$350,000 (since 2023)

The Jockey Club Oaks Invitational Stakes is an American Grade III stakes race Thoroughbred horse race for three-year-old fillies run over a distance of one and three-eighth miles on the turf held annually in September at Belmont Park, Elmont, New York. The purse for the event is US$350,000.

== History ==
In 2019 the New York Racing Association with the influx of racino dollars created a new racing series for three-year-old fillies called the Turf Tiara. The Jockey Club Oaks Invitational Stakes was positioned as the third and last leg of the new three race series held over the long distance of 1 3/8 miles with an impressive purse of US$700,000. The other events of the Turf Tiara are the Belmont Oaks at Belmont Park held in July and the Saratoga Oaks Invitational Stakes at Saratoga held in August. The event is run on the same day as the Jockey Club Derby Invitational Stakes which is the final leg of the Turf Trinity, an analogous series for three-year-old colts and geldings.

The inaugural running on 8 September 2019 was won by His Highness The Aga Khan's Edisa. Starting as the 8/5 favorite Edisa started slowly but finished strongly to win by 3/4 of a length over the Irish-bred Wonderment in a time of 2:17.02. Edisa was sired by the American Champion Kitten's Joy in Kentucky but made her first six starts in France and placed second in both the Group 2 Prix de Malleret and Group 3 Prix de Psyche.

In 2020 due to the COVID-19 pandemic in the United States, NYRA did not schedule the event in their updated and reformatted fall meeting.

In the 2021 renewal of the event six fillies entered with the first four finishers being Irish-bred. The winner, Shantisara had previously won at Arlington Park in the Grade 3 Pucker Up Stakes and in her next start won the Grade 1 Queen Elizabeth II Challenge Cup Stakes at Keeneland.

With the outstanding quality the event displayed, the American Graded Stakes Committee in 2022 upgraded the classification of the event to Grade III. Also the event in 2022 was moved to Aqueduct Racetrack due to infield tunnel and redevelopment work at Belmont Park. The event was held on the inner turf track and the winner, the British-bred McKulick set a new track record of 2:12.38.

== Records ==
Speed record:

- 1 3/8 miles: 2:12.38 – McKulick (GB) (2022) (new track record at Aqueduct)

Margins:

- 1 1/2 lengths – Beautiful Love (IRE) (2024)

Most wins by an owner:

- 2 – Godolphin (2023, 2024)

Most wins by a jockey:

- 3 – Flavien Prat (2019, 2021, 2025)

Most wins by a trainer:

- 2 – Chad C. Brown (2021, 2022)
- 2 – Charlie Appleby (2023, 2024)

== Winners ==
Year	Winner	Jockey	Trainer	Owner	Distance	Time	Purse	Grade	Ref
At Aqueduct
2025	Fionn	Flavien Prat	Brad H. Cox	George Messina & Michael Lee	1 3/8 miles	2:17.22	$350,000	III	
2024	Beautiful Love (IRE)	Dylan Davis	Charlie Appleby	Godolphin	1 3/8 miles	2:15.28	$350,000	III	
2023	Eternal Hope (IRE)	Jamie Spencer	Charlie Appleby	Godolphin	1 3/8 miles	2:16.47	$350,000	III	
2022	McKulick (GB)	Irad Ortiz Jr.	Chad C. Brown	Klaravich Stables	1 3/8 miles	2:12.38	$671,000	III	
At Belmont Park
2021	Shantisara (IRE)	Flavien Prat	Chad C. Brown	Madaket Stables, Michael Dubb & Robert V. LaPenta	1 3/8 miles	2:16.91	$671,000		
2020	Race not held								
2019	Edisa	Flavien Prat	Alain de Royer-Dupré	Aga Khan IV	1 3/8 miles	2:17.01	$752,000		

Legend:
Turf

== See also ==
- List of American and Canadian Graded races
- Jockey Club Derby Invitational Stakes
