= Cairngorm (horse) =

American-bred Thoroughbred racehorse

- Sire: Star Ruby
- Grandsire: Hampton
- Dam: Linda Vista
- Damsire: Wildidle
- Sex: Stallion
- Foaled: 1902
- Country: United States
- Color: Bay
- Breeder: James Ben Ali Haggin
- Owner: Sydney Paget
- Trainer: A. Jack Joyner
- Record: 90: 19-20-17
- Earnings: US$57,380

Major wins
- Bay Ridge Handicap (1905); Brighton Cup Preliminary (1905); Brighton Cup (1905); Carlton Stakes (1905); Brooklyn Derby (1905); Pocantico Stakes (1905); Saratoga Derby (1905) American Classics wins: Preakness Stakes (1905)
- Last updated on 19 July 2021

Cairngorm (foaled 1902 in California) was an American Thoroughbred racehorse best known for winning the 1905 Preakness Stakes.

== Background ==
Bred by James Ben Ali Haggin, Cairngorm was out of Haggin's mare Linda Vista, and sired by his British stallion, Star Ruby. Grandsire Hampton was a multiple winner of top races in England and the Leading sire in Great Britain and Ireland in 1887. As an unnamed yearling, at $15,000 he brought the highest price at Haggin's annual Rancho Del Paso California yearling sale, held on June 17, 1903, in the paddock at Gravesend Race Track in Brooklyn, New York. Purchased by an agent for Sydney Paget, Cairngorm was trained by future U.S. Racing Hall of Fame inductee, Jack Joyner.

== Early career ==
A winner at two but not in any of the important stakes for his age group, as a three-year-old Cairngorm was among the top horses of his age group, ranked near the great 1905 Three-Year-Old Champion and American Horse of the Year, Sysonby.

Cairngorm's wins included the May 19, 1905 Pocantico Stakes at Belmont Park, the May 27 Preakness Stakes, run that year at a mile and seventy yards at Gravesend Race Track in Brooklyn, New York, the May 31 Carleton Stakes at Gravesend, the June 27 Bay Ridge Handicap at Sheepshead Bay, and the August 17 Saratoga Derby.

Having inherited from his sire the ability to run at long distances, on September 26 Cairngorm won the mile and a half Brighton Cup Trial and then the Brighton Cup at two and a quarter miles.

== Later career ==
Four-year-old Cairngorm made his first start of the year on June 1, 1906, scoring an impressive win in a mile and a sixteenth handicap event at Belmont Park. However, on June 21, he ran ninth in the Suburban Handicap, the premier event in the United States for older horses and for the remainder of the year showed little of his three-year-old form. At age five, Cairngorm ran sixth in the 1907 Suburban Handicap then on June 25 won a six and a half furlong race at Sheepshead Bay but did not figure in any other significant races before retiring in the latter part of the year.

== Pedigree ==
Pedigree of Cairngorm (USA), bay stallion, 1902
Sire Star Ruby (GB) 1892	Hampton (GB); 1872	Lord Clifden	Newminster
Sire Star Ruby (GB) 1892	Hampton (GB); 1872	Lord Clifden	The Slave
Sire Star Ruby (GB) 1892	Hampton (GB); 1872	Lady Langden	Kettledrum
Sire Star Ruby (GB) 1892	Hampton (GB); 1872	Lady Langden	Haricot
Sire Star Ruby (GB) 1892	Ornament (GB); 1887	Bend Or	Doncaster
Sire Star Ruby (GB) 1892	Ornament (GB); 1887	Bend Or	Rouge Rose
Sire Star Ruby (GB) 1892	Ornament (GB); 1887	Lily Agnes	Macaroni
Sire Star Ruby (GB) 1892	Ornament (GB); 1887	Lily Agnes	Polly Agnes
Dam Linda Vista (USA) 1889	Wildidle (USA); 1870	Australian	West Australian
Dam Linda Vista (USA) 1889	Wildidle (USA); 1870	Australian	Emilia
Dam Linda Vista (USA) 1889	Wildidle (USA); 1870	Idlewild	Lexington*
Dam Linda Vista (USA) 1889	Wildidle (USA); 1870	Idlewild	Florine
Dam Linda Vista (USA) 1889	Tricksey (USA); 1885	Joe Hooker	Monday
Dam Linda Vista (USA) 1889	Tricksey (USA); 1885	Joe Hooker	Mayflower
Dam Linda Vista (USA) 1889	Tricksey (USA); 1885	Abbie Williamson	Norfolk*
Dam Linda Vista (USA) 1889	Tricksey (USA); 1885	Abbie Williamson	Ada C

* Cairngorm is inbred 4D x 5D to the stallion Lexington, meaning that he appears fourth generation and fifth generation (via Norfolk) on the dam side of his pedigree.
