= Dubai Millennium Stakes =

- Class: Group 3
- Location: Meydan Racecourse; Dubai, United Arab Emirates
- Inaugurated: 2014
- Race type: Thoroughbred – Flat racing

Race information
- Distance: 2,000 metres
- Surface: Turf
- Track: Left-handed
- Qualification: 4-y-o+
- Purse: $200,000

The Dubai Millennium Stakes, is a horse race for horses aged four and over, run at a distance of 2,000 metres (ten furlongs) on turf in February at Meydan Racecourse in Dubai.

The Dubai Millennium Stakes was first contested in 2014 as a Listed race before being elevated to Group 3 class in 2016. It is named in honour of the racehorse Dubai Millennium.

== Records ==
Record time:

- 2:00.33 – Ghaiyyath 2020

Most successful horse:

- no horse has won this race more than once

Most wins by a jockey:

- 6 – William Buick 2016, 2018, 2020, 2021, 2023, 2025

Most wins by a trainer:

- 9 – Charlie Appleby 2016, 2018, 2019, 2020, 2021, 2022, 2023, 2024, 2025

Most wins by an owner:

- 11 – Godolphin 2014, 2015, 2016, 2018, 2019, 2020, 2021, 2022, 2023, 2024, 2025

== Winners ==
Year	Winner	Age	Jockey	Trainer	Owner	Time
2014	Tasaday	4	Silvestre de Sousa	Saeed bin Suroor	Godolphin	2:02.33
2015	Hunter's Light	7	James Doyle	Saeed bin Suroor	Godolphin	2:00.67
2016	Tryster	5	William Buick	Charlie Appleby	Godolphin	2:04.79
2017	Zarak	4	Christophe Soumillon	Alain de Royer-Dupré	Aga Khan IV	2:03.73
2018	Folkswood	5	William Buick	Charlie Appleby	Godolphin	2:02.33
2019	Spotify	5	James Doyle	Charlie Appleby	Godolphin	2:05.55
2020	Ghaiyyath	5	William Buick	Charlie Appleby	Godolphin	2:00.33
2021	Star Safari	5	William Buick	Charlie Appleby	Godolphin	2:04.01
2022	Royal Fleet	4	James Doyle	Charlie Appleby	Godolphin	2:01:61
2023	Nations Pride	4	William Buick	Charlie Appleby	Godolphin	2:01:16
2024	Warren Point	5	Mickael Barzalona	Charlie Appleby	Godolphin	2:01.19
2025	First Conquest	4	William Buick	Charlie Appleby	Godolphin	2:00.69
2026	Fort George	4	Kieran Shoemark	Ed Walker	Mrs. Fitri Hay	2:01.29

== See also ==
- List of United Arab Emirates horse races
