= Dylan Davis =

American jockey (born 1994)

Personal information
- Born: November 15, 1994 (age 31) Manhasset, New York
- Occupation: Jockey

Horse racing career
- Sport: Horse racing
- Career wins: 1,623 (2/08/26)

Major racing wins
- Royal Delta Stakes (2025); Adirondack Stakes (2024); Distaff Stakes (2024); Fort Marcy Stakes (2024); Jockey Club Derby Invitational Stakes (2024); Jockey Club Oaks Invitational Stakes (2024); Knickerbocker Stakes (2024); Lake George Stakes (2024); Matron Stakes (2024); New York Derby (2024); Saratoga Derby Invitational Stakes (2024); Woodward Stakes (2024); Flower Bowl Stakes (2023); Nearctic Stakes (2023); Summer Stakes (2023); Barbara Fritchie Stakes (2022); Distaff Handicap (2022); With Anticipation Stakes (2022); Dance Smartly Stakes (2021); E. P. Taylor Stakes (2021); Jerome Stakes (2021, 2023); Long Island Stakes (2021); Turnback the Alarm Handicap (2021); Belmont Futurity Stakes (2020); Long Island Stakes (2020); Withers Stakes (2020); Kelso Handicap (2019); Queens County Handicap (2019); Yaddo Stakes (2019, 2022, 2023); Empire Classic Stakes (2018); Hollie Hughes Stakes (2018, 2019); Soaring Softly Stakes (2018); Toboggan Stakes (2018); Westchester Stakes (2018); Ladies Stakes (2015)

Racing awards
- NYRA Leading Jockey (2022, 2024)

Significant horses
- Carson’s Run, Pat On the Back, Mutamakina

Dylan Davis (born November 15, 1994) is an American thoroughbred jockey since 2012. In 2018, he "tied a New York Racing Association record ... with a six-win day". At the Aqueduct Racetrack, Davis had the most winter victories in 2022 and 2024. He also had the most wins as a NYRA jockey during 2022. Davis has won 23 Grade III, 9 Grade II and 6 Grade I events as a graded stakes race jockey.

In the Turf Triple Series, he was first in the Saratoga Derby Invitational Stakes and Jockey Club Derby Invitational Stakes during 2024. That year, Dylan was the Jockey Club Oaks Invitational Stakes winner during the Turf Tiara. He also won the Alabama Stakes as a Triple Tiara of Thoroughbred Racing competitor. In the Breeders' Cup, his highest finish was third place at that year's Juvenile Fillies event. Davis has won more than 1,600 races and accumulated over $110 million in prize winnings.

== Early life ==
Davis was born in Manhasset, New York on November 15, 1994 and has five siblings. He competed in motocross during his childhood. In high school, Davis was an amateur wrestler. During 2010, he became an exercise rider. His training was at the North American Racing Academy throughout the early 2010s.

== Career ==
=== Racecourses ===
As a thoroughbred jockey, Davis went to Saratoga Race Course in 2012 and became an apprentice. His victories that year were all at Suffolk Downs. Davis continued his apprenticeship leading up to 2014. During 2018, he "tied a New York Racing Association record ... with a six-win day".

In March 2021, Davis had a clavicle injury. He stopped racing and resumed his career during May 2021. In 2022, Davis had the most winter victories at the Aqueduct Racetrack. That year, he had the most wins at NYRA events. In 2024, he had the most winter victories at Aqueduct.

In November 2025, his racing career stopped after an accident. Some of his injuries included "fractures of [nine] ribs ... [and] a grade 5 laceration of the left kidney". Dylan underwent physical therapy and a nephrectomy before he continued racing during February 2026.

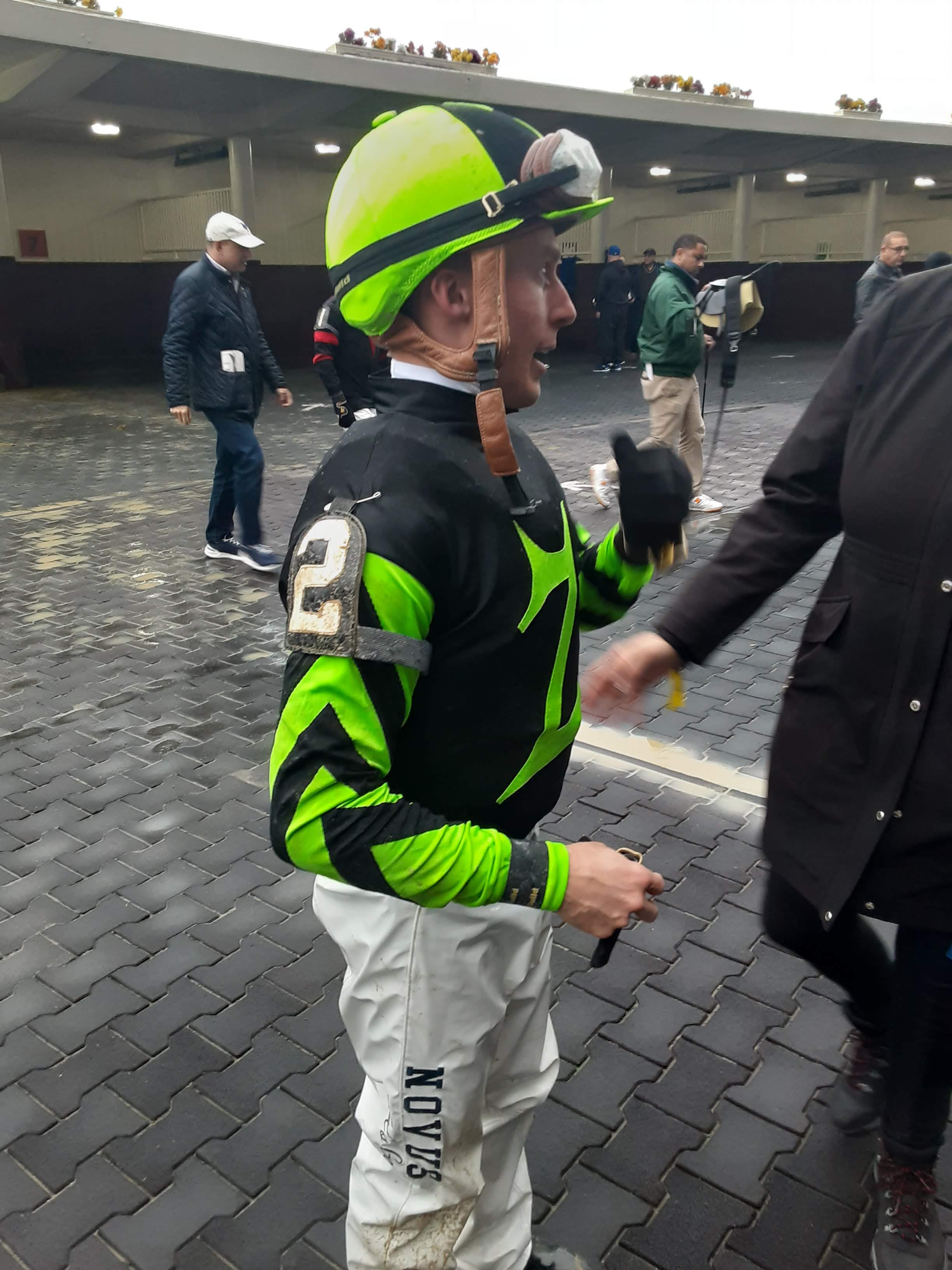
Dylan Davis in October 2023 at Aqueduct Racetrack in Queens, New York.

=== Major races ===
Davis became a graded stakes race winner at the Soaring Softly Stakes during 2018. He has won 23 Grade III, 9 Grade II and 6 Grade I events. Davis was twelfth at the 2020 Breeders' Cup Juvenile Turf Sprint. During 2023, he was ninth in the Breeders' Cup Juvenile Turf during 2023. In 2024, Davis finished third at the Breeders' Cup Juvenile Fillies and fourteenth at the Breeders' Cup Juvenile Fillies Turf.

As part of the Triple Crown of Thoroughbred Racing, Davis was eighth at the 2022 Belmont Stakes. He was also eighth during the 2026 Belmont Stakes. During the Triple Tiara of Thoroughbred Racing, Dylan was first at the 2024 Acorn Stakes. He was also fourth at the 2025 Alabama Stakes.

In the Turf Triple Series, Davis was sixth at the 2023 Belmont Derby Invitational Stakes. The following year, he won the Saratoga Derby Invitational Stakes and Jockey Club Derby Invitational Stakes. As a Turf Tiara competitor, Davis was the winner of the Jockey Club Oaks Invitational Stakes in 2024.

== Overall performance and personal life ==
In Equibase rankings for North American events, Davis reached 9th place for wins and 10th place for earnings during 2024. He has won over 1,600 races and accumulated over $110 million in prize winnings. He has two kids and is married. His father is retired jockey Robbie Davis.
