= Turnback the Alarm Stakes =

- Class: Listed
- Location: Aqueduct Racetrack; Queens, New York, United States
- Inaugurated: 1995 (as Turnback the Alarm Handicap)
- Race type: Thoroughbred - Flat racing
- Website: NYRA

Race information
- Distance: 1 1/8 miles (9 furlongs)
- Surface: Dirt
- Track: left-handed
- Qualification: Fillies & Mares, three-years-old and older
- Weight: Base weights with allowances: 4-year-olds and up: 125 lbs. 3-year-olds: 122 lbs.
- Purse: $150,000 (2021)

The Turnback the Alarm Stakes is a Listed American Thoroughbred horse race for fillies and mares, age three-years-old and older run over a distance 1 1/8 miles run annually in late October or early November usually Aqueduct Racetrack in Queens, New York. The event currently offers a purse of $150,000.

== History ==
The event is named after, Turnback the Alarm, a winner of five Grade 1 races on New York Racing Association tracks in 1992 and 1993 including the Coaching Club American Oaks, Mother Goose Stakes as a three-year-old and the Go for Wand Stakes, Shuvee Handicap, Hempstead Handicap as a four-year-old. She was bought by Japanese interests and taken there in 1997, where she produced a winner from the sire Sunday Silence.

The event was inaugurated on 1 November 1995 and was won by Incinerate, who was ridden by Filiberto Leon and trained by the US Hall of Fame trainer H. Allen Jerkens in a time of 1:48.89 by three lengths.

In 1999 the event was classified as Grade III.

The event was held at Belmont Park in 2008, 2010 and between 2012–2017 and 2021. While the event was held at Belmont Park the distance was decreased to 1 1/16 miles.

In 2023 the event was downgraded by the Thoroughbred Owners and Breeders Association to Listed status

== Records ==
Speed record:

- 1 1/8 miles: 1:48.89 - Incinerate (1995)
- 1 1/16 miles: 1:41.96 - America (2015)

Margins:

- 9 1/2 lengths - Indian Vale (2005)

Most wins:

- No horse has won this race more than once.

Most wins by a jockey:

- 5 - John Velazquez (1998, 1999, 2005, 2008, 2017)

Most wins by a trainer:

- 4 - Todd A. Pletcher (2005, 2009, 2014, 2017)

Most wins by an owner:

- 2 - Stronach Stables (1995, 2007)
- 2 - Helen C. Alexander, Helen K. Groves & Dorothy A. Matz (2000, 2008)
- 2 - Bobby Flay (2014, 2015)
- 2 - Alpha Delta Stables (2012, 2016)

== Winners ==
| Year | Winner | Age | Jockey | Trainer | Owner | Distance | Time | Purse | Grade | Ref |
|---|---|---|---|---|---|---|---|---|---|---|
At Aqueduct – Turnback the Alarm Stakes
| 2025 | Standoutsensation | 4 | Kendrick Carmouche | Thomas M. Amoss | Richard J. Emmett & Joel Politi | 1 1/8 miles | 1:52.32 | $145,500 | Listed | |
| 2024 | Evidencias (BRZ) | 5 | Joel Rosario | Christophe Clement | James Wigan & Denford Stud | 1 1/8 miles | 1:51.03 | $145,500 | Listed | |
| 2023 | Interstatedaydream | 4 | Trevor McCarthy | Brad H. Cox | Flurry Racing Stables | 1 1/8 miles | 1:50.34 | $145,500 | Listed | |
Turnback the Alarm Handicap
| 2022 | Battle Bling | 4 | Kendrick Carmouche | Rob Atras | Michael Dubb & Gandharvi | 1 1/8 miles | 1:53.60 | $139,500 | III | |
At Belmont Park
| 2021 | Gibberish | 4 | Dylan Davis | Saffie A. Joseph Jr. | e Five Racing Thoroughbreds | 1 1/8 miles | 1:51.93 | $145,500 | III | |
At Aqueduct
| 2020 | Royal Flag | 4 | Trevor McCarthy | Chad C. Brown | William S. Farish III | 1 1/8 miles | 1:54.08 | $97,000 | III | |
| 2019 | Golden Award | 4 | Junior Alvarado | William I. Mott | Summer Wind Equine | 1 1/8 miles | 1:49.46 | $150,000 | III | |
| 2018 | Teresa Z | 4 | Trevor McCarthy | Anthony R. Margotta Jr. | St. Elias Stable | 1 1/8 miles | 1:51.68 | $150,000 | III | |
At Belmont Park
| 2017 | Eskenformoney | 5 | John R. Velazquez | Todd A. Pletcher | StarLadies Racing & Lisa Troutt | 1 1/16 miles | 1:43.12 | $200,000 | III | |
| 2016 | Lewis Bay | 3 | Irad Ortiz Jr. | Chad C. Brown | Alpha Delta Stables | 1 1/16 miles | 1:42.09 | $200,000 | III | |
| 2015 | America | 4 | Christopher P. DeCarlo | William I. Mott | Bobby Flay | 1 1/16 miles | 1:41.96 | $200,000 | III | |
| 2014 | Dame Dorothy | 3 | Javier Castellano | Todd A. Pletcher | Bobby Flay | 1 1/16 miles | 1:43.50 | $200,000 | III | |
| 2013 | Stanwyck | 4 | Alex O. Solis | John Shirreffs | Mr. & Mrs. Jerry Moss | 1 1/16 miles | 1:42.62 | $200,000 | III | |
| 2012 | Afleeting Lady | 5 | Joel Rosario | Dale L. Romans | Alpha Delta Stables & Richard Santulli | 1 1/16 miles | 1:42.17 | $150,000 | III | |
At Aqueduct
| 2011 | Arena Elvira | 4 | Junior Alvarado | William I. Mott | Carolyn Wilson | 1 1/8 miles | 1:51.59 | $98,000 | III | |
At Belmont Park
| 2010 | Our Khrysty | 4 | Ramon A. Dominguez | Todd M. Beattie | Renpher Stable | 1 1/16 miles | 1:43.21 | $100,000 | III | |
At Aqueduct
| 2009 | Unbridled Belle | 6 | Ramon A. Dominguez | Todd A. Pletcher | Team Valor International | 1 1/8 miles | 1:50.20 | $109,000 | III | |
At Belmont Park
| 2008 | Altesse | 5 | John R. Velazquez | Claude R. McGaughey III | Helen C. Alexander, Helen K. Groves & Dorothy A. Matz | 1 1/8 miles | 1:50.02 | $107,600 | III | |
At Aqueduct
| 2007 | Sugar Shake | 4 | Javier Castellano | Robert J. Frankel | Stronach Stables | 1 1/8 miles | 1:50.02 | $105,300 | III | |
| 2006 | Miss Shop | 3 | Raul I. Rojas | H. Allen Jerkens | Hobeau Farm | 1 1/8 miles | 1:50.93 | $107,800 | III | |
| 2005 | Indian Vale | 3 | John R. Velazquez | Todd A. Pletcher | Melnyk Racing | 1 1/8 miles | 1:49.83 | $105,800 | III | |
| 2004 | Personal Legend | 4 | Jerry D. Bailey | Robert J. Frankel | Edmund A. Gann | 1 1/8 miles | 1:51.27 | $110,700 | III | |
| 2003 | Pocus Hocus | 5 | Jose A. Santos | James A. Jerkens | Susan & John Moore | 1 1/8 miles | 1:50.67 | $107,500 | III | |
| 2002 | Svea Dahl | 5 | Richard Migliore | Bruce N. Levine | Roddy J. Valente | 1 1/8 miles | 1:50.42 | $108,000 | III | |
| 2001 | Rochelle's Terms | 4 | Robbie Davis | Howard M. Tesher | Four Media Farm | 1 1/8 miles | 1:51.19 | $108,500 | III | |
| 2000 | § Atelier | 3 | Edgar S. Prado | Claude R. McGaughey III | Helen C. Alexander, Helen K. Groves & Dorothy A. Matz | 1 1/8 miles | 1:48.95 | $113,200 | III | |
| 1999 | Belle Cherie | 3 | John R. Velazquez | Philip G. Johnson | Belle Meadows Farm & Lael Stable | 1 1/8 miles | 1:50.03 | $110,000 | III | |
| 1998 | Snit | 4 | John R. Velazquez | Barclay Tagg | William M. Backer | 1 1/8 miles | 1:51.30 | $82,900 | Listed | |
| 1997 | Mil Kilates | 4 | Joe Bravo | Alfredo Callejas | Robert Perez | 1 1/8 miles | 1:49.40 | $80,550 | Listed | |
| 1996 | Shoop | 5 | Jerry D. Bailey | Gasper S. Moschera | Barbara J. Davis | 1 1/8 miles | 1:51.35 | $78,279 | Listed | |
| 1995 | Incinerate | 5 | Filiberto Leon | H. Allen Jerkens | Stronach Stables | 1 1/8 miles | 1:48.89 | $81,675 | Listed | |

Notes:
§ Ran as an entry

== See also ==
List of American and Canadian Graded races
