= Soaring Softly Stakes =

- Class: Grade III
- Location: Belmont Park; Elmont, New York, United States
- Inaugurated: 2014 (as Wait A While Stakes)
- Race type: Thoroughbred - Flat racing - Turf
- Website: nyra.com

Race information
- Distance: 7 furlongs
- Surface: Turf
- Track: Left-handed
- Qualification: Fillies, three years old
- Weight: 123lbs. with allowances
- Purse: $175,000 (since 2023)

The Soaring Softly Stakes is a Grade III American Thoroughbred horse race for three years old fillies, over a distance of 7 furlongs on the turf held annually in May at Belmont Park in Elmont, New York. The event currently carries a purse of $175,000.

== History ==
The race was inaugurated in 2014 as the Wait A While Stakes with a stakes purse of $100,000 after the American Oaks and duel Yellow Ribbon Stakes winner Wait A While.

In 2018 the event was classified as Grade III.

The race was renamed in 2016 to the Soaring Softly Stakes after the 1999 American Champion Female Turf Horse and inaugural Breeders' Cup Filly and Mare Turf winner Soaring Softly.

In 2024 the event was moved to Aqueduct Racetrack due to infield tunnel and redevelopment work at Belmont Park. The distance of the event was decreased to six furlongs since the Aqueduct turf course does not hold events over the 7 furlong distance.

In 2025 the event was moved to Saratoga and due to the state of the turf track was moved and held on the dirt track over a distance of five-and-one-half furlongs.

== Records ==
Speed record:

- 5 1/2 furlongs: 1:01:02 - Slay the Day (2026)
- 6 furlongs: 1:09.41 - Pipsy (IRE) (2024)
- 7 furlongs: 1:19.93 - Morticia (2017)

Margins:

- 4 lengths - Nootka Sound (2018)

Most wins by a jockey:

- 2 - Eric Cancel (2016, 2021)
- 2 - John R. Velazquez (2014, 2026)

Most wins by a trainer:

- 4 - Wesley A. Ward (2014, 2018, 2022, 2025)

Most wins by an owner:

- No owner has won this race more than once.

== Winners ==
Year	Winner	Jockey	Trainer	Owner	Distance	Time	Purse	Grade	Ref
At Saratoga – Soaring Softly Stakes
2026	Slay the Day	John R. Velazquez	Brian A. Lynch	Flying Dutchmen	5 1/2 furlongs	1:01.02	$200,000	III	
2025	Saturday Flirt	Junior Alvarado	Wesley A. Ward	Mrs. Fitriani Hay	5 1/2 furlongs	1:04.00	$175,000	Listed	
At Aqueduct
2024	Pipsy (IRE)	Flavien Prat	William Walden	Woodford Thoroughbreds	6 furlongs	1:09.41	$175,000	III	
At Belmont Park
2023	Queen Picasso (GB)	Jose Ortiz	Christophe Clement	Sienna Farm, Michael E. Kisber, Peter Deutsch & The Elkstone Group	7 furlongs	1:21.24	$169,750	III	
2022	Chardy Party (IRE)	Irad Ortiz Jr.	Wesley A. Ward	Stonestreet Farm	7 furlongs	1:21.47	$100,000	III	
2021	Bye Bye	Eric Cancel	Christophe Clement	Bach Stables	7 furlongs	1:21.19	$100,000	III	
2020	Race not held								
2019	Seek and Destroy	Kendrick Carmouche	Chad C. Brown	e Five Racing	7 furlongs	1:22.53	$100,000	III	
2018	Nootka Sound	Dylan Davis	Wesley A. Ward	Hat Creek Racing	7 furlongs	1:24.59	$98,000	III	
2017	Morticia	Jose Lezcano	George Arnold	G. Watts Humphrey Jr.	7 furlongs	1:19.93	$100,000	Listed	
2016	Lightstream	Eric Cancel	Brian A. Lynch	Up Hill Stable & Head of Plains Partners	7 furlongs	1:20.54	$100,000		
Wait A While Stakes
2015	Celestine	Rajiv Maragh	William I. Mott	James A. Bryan Jr.	7 furlongs	1:21.06	$98,000		
2014	Richies Party Girl	John R. Velazquez	Wesley A. Ward	Richard Ravin and Wesley A. Ward	7 furlongs	1:21.84	$98,000		

Legend:
Dirt Turf
