= Ghaiyyath =

Irish-bred Thoroughbred racehorse

- Sire: Dubawi
- Dam: Nightime
- Sex: Colt
- Foaled: 19 April 2015
- Country: Ireland
- Colour: Bay
- Breeder: Springbank Way Stud
- Owner: Godolphin
- Trainer: Charlie Appleby
- Record: 13: 9-1-2
- Earnings: £759,161

Major wins
- Autumn Stakes (2017); Prix du Prince d'Orange (2018); Prix d'Harcourt (2019); Grosser Preis von Baden (2019); Dubai Millennium Stakes (2020); Coronation Cup (2020); Eclipse Stakes (2020); International Stakes (2020)

Awards
- European Horse of the Year (2020); Cartier Champion Older Horse (2020)

Ghaiyyath (foaled 19 April 2015) is an Irish-bred British-trained champion Thoroughbred racehorse who was the 2020 European Horse of the Year after winning the Juddmonte International Stakes, Eclipse Stakes, Coronation Cup, and Dubai Millennium Stakes.

He showed very promising form as a juvenile in 2017 when he won two of his three races including the Autumn Stakes. Training problems restricted him to only one start in 2018, a victory in the Prix du Prince d'Orange. In the spring of 2019 he won the Prix d'Harcourt and ran third in the Prix Ganay before returning in autumn to win the Grosser Preis von Baden by fourteen lengths. In 2020 he added victories in the Dubai Millennium Stakes, Coronation Cup, Eclipse Stakes and International Stakes.

== Background ==
Ghaiyyath is a bay horse with a white star and a white sock on his left hind leg bred in Ireland by the County Kildare-based Springbank Way Stud. As a foal in November 2015 he was offered for sale at Goffs and was bought for €1,100,000 by John Ferguson on behalf of Godolphin. The colt was sent into training with Charlie Appleby at Godolphin's British base at Newmarket, Suffolk.

He was sired by Dubawi, whose wins included the Irish 2,000 Guineas and the Prix Jacques Le Marois. At stud, Dubawi has been a highly-successful breeding stallion, siring major winners such as Monterosso, Al Kazeem, Makfi, Lucky Nine and Night of Thunder. Ghaiyyath's dam Nightime was a top-class performer who won the Irish 1,000 Guineas in 2008 and went on to produce several other winners including the Man o' War Stakes winner Zhukova. Nightime's dam Caumshinaun, who produced seven other winners, was a successful racemare who won five races including the Listed Platinum Stakes in 2001. She was a distant descendant of the British broodmare Springtime (foaled 1932), the ancestor of numerous major winners including Blakeney, Morston and Classic Cliche.

== Racing career ==
=== 2017: two-year-old season ===
Ghaiyyath made his racecourse debut on 15 September in a maiden race over one mile at Doncaster Racecourse in which he started the 6/5 favourite but finished third behind Blue Laureate and Sha La La La Lee. Thirteen days later the colt was equipped with a hood when he went off favourite for a similar event at Newmarket Racecourse. Ridden as on his debut by James Doyle he led from the start and went clear in the last quarter mile to win "easily" by five lengths. William Buick took the ride when the colt was stepped up in class to contest the Group 3 Autumn Stakes over one mile at Newmarket on 14 October and started the 11/4 second favourite behind the John Gosden-trained Bear Slam. After racing in mid-division he struggled to obtain a clear run in the last quarter mile but broke through to take the lead in the closing stages and won by one and three quarter lengths from Dream Today with two and a half lengths back to Bear Slam in third. Buick commented "He bunny-hopped out of the stalls and I wanted to be closer than what I was but they went a nice gallop and he travelled sweet throughout and won well in the end.He gave me a nice feel. He's a big horse who is going to be better next year."

=== 2018: three-year-old season ===
In early 2018 Ghaiyyath was considered a serious contender for the Epsom Derby, but after sustaining a training injury when being prepared for a run in the Dante Stakes he was off the track until the autumn of 2018. On 22 September he made his return in the Prix du Prince d'Orange over 2000 metres at Longchamp Racecourse and started the 1.9/1 favourite in a seven-runner field. With Buick in the saddle he raced in second place behind his pacemaking stablemate Stage Magic before going to the front 300 metres from the finish and pulling clear to win by three lengths from Sacred Life.

=== 2019: four-year-old season ===
Ghaiyyath spent the winter of 2018/19 at Godolphin's base in Dubai. On 7 April, he began his third campaign in the Group 3 Prix d'Harcourt over 2000 metres at Longchamp and started the 7/10 favourite against four opponents headed by the Prix Jean Prat winner Intellogent. He took the lead from the start and opened up a big advantage over his rivals before being eased down in the closing stages to win by one and a half lengths from Soleil Marin. Appleby commented "I am delighted with that performance – he is a horse with a future... Ghaiyyath is a very strong galloper. If something could go faster than him, then we would let them go on, but nothing can give him a lead because he is such a strong traveller". Three weeks later at the same track the colt was moved up to Group 1 level for the first time and started the 1/2 favourite for the Prix Ganay over 2100 metres and sustained his first defeat in over eighteen months as he came home third behind Waldgeist and Study of Man.

After four months off the track Ghaiyyath made his comeback in Germany on 1 September when he started 2.3/1 second favourite for the Group 1 Grosser Preis von Baden over 2400 metres. The three-year-old colt Laccario headed the betting after winning the Deutsches Derby while the other seven runners included Communique (Princess of Wales's Stakes), Ashrun (Prix de Reux), Accon (Frühjahrs Dreijährigen-Preis) and Donjah (Herzog von Ratibor-Rennen). Ghaiyyath led from the start and extended his lead in the straight to finish fourteen lengths clear of Donjah in second, despite being eased down by Buick in the final strides. After the race Buick said "He's a monster, an absolute monster. Let's hope that he'll be around for a while. He's an amazing horse".

On 6 October Ghaiyyath started 13/1 fourth favourite for the Prix de l'Arc de Triomphe over 2400 metres on very soft ground at Longchamp. He led the race until 500 metres from the finish but then tired and dropped back rapidly to come home tenth of the twelve runners, more than thirty lengths behind the winner Waldgeist.

In the 2019 World's Best Racehorse Rankings Ghaiyyath was given a rating of 126, making him the 5th best racehorse in the world.

=== 2020: five-year-old season ===
==== Spring ====
As in the previous season Ghaiyyath spent the winter of 2019/20 in Dubai and began his campaign on 20 February when he started 4/9 favourite for the Group 3 Dubai Millennium Stakes (a race named after his grandsire) over 2000 metres at Meydan Racecourse, with the best of his six opponents looking to be Spotify (winner of the race in 2019) and Desert Encounter (Canadian International Stakes). Ghaiyyath led from the start and won "easily" by eight and a half lengths in a track record time of 2:00.33. Appleby commented I'm delighted. We've all seen what this horse can do, especially coming up his first start, there... The plan was to just let him float into the race from his outside post and once he was on the lead, we would let him roll along. We've seen on numerous occasions what he can do when he's left to his own devices like that." Ghaiyyath was scheduled to contest the Dubai Sheema Classic on Dubai World Cup Night in March but the meeting was abandoned owing to the COVID-19 pandemic.

==== Summer ====
The flat racing season in Europe was rearranged in response to the COVID outbreak and the Group 1 Hurworth Bloodstock Coronation Cup was run over one and a half miles at Newmarket (rather than Epsom) on 5 June. With Buick in the saddle Ghaiyyath started the 11/10 favourite in a seven runner field which also included Stradivarius, Anthony Van Dyck, Defoe and Desert Encounter. Ghaiyyath went to the front from the start, opened up a clear advantage by half way and was never seriously challenged, coming home two and a half lengths clear of Anthony Van Dyck. The winning time of 2:25.89 was a new course record. Appleby commented "He was on it from flagfall but I could see he was in a rhythm we'd seen before. His mid-race move just kills them and it's great for him to get his first British Group 1 win. We had a lot of confidence that we had him in a condition that we haven't seen before. His strength is there and the way he was finishing off his gallops suggested he was the finished article."

On 5 July at Sandown Park Ghaiyyath was dropped back in distance and started 9/4 second favourite behind Enable for the ten furlong Eclipse Stakes. The other five contenders were Japan, Deirdre, Magic Wand (Mackinnon Stakes), Regal Reality (Brigadier Gerard Stakes) and Bangkok. Ghaiyyath led from the start as usual, accelerated three furlongs out and won "comfortably" by two and a quarter lengths and a head from Enable and Japan. After the race William Buick said "He's got a huge cruising speed and he knows how to use it. He's a joy to ride and a very, very good horse. As a five-year-old he's mature physically and mentally... I think a mile and a quarter will be his optimum trip... Sometimes when you ride him over a mile and a half you're always worried the last furlong is going to be a long one, but he keeps going." Shortly after the race Ghaiyyath was rated the best horse in the world in the interim edition of the World Rankings.

Ghaiyyath returned for the International Stakes over ten and a half furlongs at York Racecourse on 15 August and went off the 11/8 favourite against four opponents namely Magical, Lord North, Kameko and Rose of Kildare (Musidora Stakes). He established a clear lead soon after the start and was never seriously challenged, winning by three lengths from Magical despite being eased down in the closing stages. Buick commented "He has this amazing high cruising speed, but I thought what was evident today was the kick he had a furlong and a half out. He completely put the race to bed, finished it off, and stamped his authority. He can do things that other horses don't do. He gives you confidence. His comfort zone is different to other horses... He's the best I've ridden, without a doubt".

==== Autumn ====
On 12 September at Leopardstown Racecourse Ghaiyyath went off the 8/13 favourite for the Irish Champion Stakes over ten furlongs. He led from the start as usual but was overtaken by Magical a furlong from the finish and beaten three quarters of a length into second place. Buick offered no excuses and said that the horse "was in the same rhythm as usual."

Ghaiyyath was aiming for the 2020 Breeders' Cup, but in preparation for the race, after a piece of routine work, he showed signs of soreness behind. After veterinary investigation, the decision to retire him was announced on 19 October. Appleby commented "Ghaiyyath has had a fantastic career... His high-class cruising speed and relentless style of galloping was a joy to watch and as I have said before, this year he came together both physically and mentally and looked the finished article. It is obviously disappointing not to be taking him to the Breeders' Cup but the exertions of a long season, which started in Dubai in January, were starting to show."

On 19 November Ghaiyyath was named Horse of the Year and Champion Older Horse at the Cartier Racing Awards. In the 2020 World's Best Racehorse Rankings, Ghaiyyath was rated the best racehorse in the world, four pounds clear of the American colt Authentic. Timeform rated him at a 133, making Ghiayyath the highest rated horse in Europe and the world.

== Stud career ==
Ghaiyyath was retired from racing to stand as a breeding stallion at Kildangan Stud in 2021 at a fee of €30,000. He also shuttled to Australia for their breeding season where he stands at Northwood Park in Victoria at a fee of AUD 27,500.

=== Notable progeny ===
c = colt, f = filly, g = gelding

Foaled	Name	Sex	Major Wins
2022	Observer	c	Victoria Derby, Australian Guineas

== Pedigree ==
Pedigree of Ghaiyyath (GB), bay horse, 2015
Sire Dubawi (IRE) 2002	Dubai Millennium (GB); 1996	Seeking the Gold (USA)	Mr. Prospector
Sire Dubawi (IRE) 2002	Dubai Millennium (GB); 1996	Seeking the Gold (USA)	Con Game
Sire Dubawi (IRE) 2002	Dubai Millennium (GB); 1996	Colorado Dancer (IRE)	Shareef Dancer (USA)
Sire Dubawi (IRE) 2002	Dubai Millennium (GB); 1996	Colorado Dancer (IRE)	Fall Aspen (USA)
Sire Dubawi (IRE) 2002	Zomaradah (GB); 1995	Deploy	Shirley Heights
Sire Dubawi (IRE) 2002	Zomaradah (GB); 1995	Deploy	Slightly Dangerous (USA)
Sire Dubawi (IRE) 2002	Zomaradah (GB); 1995	Jawaher (IRE)	Dancing Brave (USA)
Sire Dubawi (IRE) 2002	Zomaradah (GB); 1995	Jawaher (IRE)	High Tern
Dam Nightime (IRE) 2003	Galileo (IRE); 1998	Sadler's Wells (USA)	Northern Dancer (CAN)
Dam Nightime (IRE) 2003	Galileo (IRE); 1998	Sadler's Wells (USA)	Fairy Bridge
Dam Nightime (IRE) 2003	Galileo (IRE); 1998	Urban Sea (USA)	Miswaki
Dam Nightime (IRE) 2003	Galileo (IRE); 1998	Urban Sea (USA)	Allegretta (GB)
Dam Nightime (IRE) 2003	Caumshinaun (IRE); 1997	Indian Ridge	Ahonoora (GB)
Dam Nightime (IRE) 2003	Caumshinaun (IRE); 1997	Indian Ridge	Hillbrow (GB)
Dam Nightime (IRE) 2003	Caumshinaun (IRE); 1997	Ridge Pool	Bluebird (USA)
Dam Nightime (IRE) 2003	Caumshinaun (IRE); 1997	Ridge Pool	Casting Couch (GB) (Family: 20-c)
