= Nightime =

Racehorse trained in Ireland

- Sire: Galileo
- Grandsire: Sadler's Wells
- Dam: Caumshinaun
- Damsire: Indian Ridge
- Sex: Mare
- Foaled: 5 April 2003
- Country: Ireland
- Colour: Chestnut
- Breeder: Marguerite Weld
- Owner: Marguerite Weld
- Trainer: Dermot Weld
- Record: 5: 2-0-0
- Earnings: £162,691

Major wins
- Irish 1,000 Guineas (2006)

Nightime (foaled 5 April 2003) is an Irish Thoroughbred racehorse and broodmare best known for winning the Irish 1,000 Guineas in 2006. After finishing unplaced in her only race as a juvenile she won a maiden race on her debut as a three-year-old and then recorded an emphatic six-length victory in the Irish 1000 Guineas. She failed to reproduce her form in two subsequent races and was retired in 2007. After her retirement from racing she had success as a broodmare, notably as the dam of Ghaiyyath.

== Background ==
Nightime is a chestnut mare with a broad white blaze and a long white sock on her left hind leg bred in Ireland by her owner Marguerite Weld. She was trained throughout her racing career by Weld's son Dermot at the Curragh in County Kildare.

She was from the first crop of foals sired by Galileo, who won the Derby, Irish Derby and King George VI and Queen Elizabeth Stakes in 2001. Galileo became a very successful breeding stallion and has been champion sire of Great Britain and Ireland five times. His other progeny included Cape Blanco, Frankel, Golden Lilac, Nathaniel, New Approach, Rip Van Winkle, Found, Minding and Ruler of the World.

Nightime's dam Caumshinaun, who produced seven other winners, was a successful racemare who won five races including the Listed Platinum Stakes in 2001. She was a distant descendant of the British broodmare Springtime (foaled 1932), the ancestor of numerous major winners including Blakeney, Morston and Classic Cliche.

== Racing career ==
=== 2005: two-year-old season ===
Rather than beginning her career in a maiden race, Nightime made her debut in the Group Three C L Weld Park Stakes, a race named in honour of Dermot Weld's father (and Marguerite's husband), over seven furlongs at the Curragh on 1 October. Ridden by Pat Shanahan she started at odds on 12/1 and finished seventh of the eight runners, three and a half lengths behind the winner Ugo Fire.

=== 2006: three-year-old season ===
On her first run as a three-year-old Nightime started the 9/10 favourite in a ten-runner maiden over eight and a half furlongs at Cork Racecourse on 16 April. Ridden by Pat Smullen, who partnered her in all her subsequent races she disputed the lead for most of the way before pulling ahead in the final furlong and winning by two lengths from Miss Dela.

On 28 May Nightime was stepped up to Group One class and started at odds of 12/1 in a fifteen-runner field for the Irish 1000 Guineas over one mile on heavy ground at the Curragh. The betting was dominated by three British challengers with Confidential Lady (winner of the Prix du Calvados and runner-up in the 1000 Guineas) heading the market from Short Dance (Radley Stakes, Michael Seely Memorial Stakes) and Nasheej (Sweet Solera Stakes, May Hill Stakes, Fred Darling Stakes). The other Irish runners included Race For The Stars (Oh So Sharp Stakes), Ugo Fire, Queen Cleopatra (Derrinstown Stud 1,000 Guineas Trial), Abigail Pett (Silver Flash Stakes, Round Tower Stakes) and Kamarinskaya (Leopardstown 1,000 Guineas Trial). Confidential Lady set the pace with Smullen settling Nightime behind the leaders before making steady progress in the straight. Nightime overtook the favourite a furlong and a half from the finish and drew clear of her opponents to win by six lengths from the 50/1 outsider Ardbrae Lady. After the race Dermot Weld said "It is a very special day for me... My mother has always believed in the filly. I wanted to sell her as a yearling but she wouldn't let me, as she thought she was special, and she has been proven right. She is in her 90th year this year and this is lovely for her." Describing his winning ride, Pat Smullen commented "Confidential Lady going off in front was great because she brought me there perfectly. I knew she would stay a mile and a quarter, so I kicked on. If anything, I'm disappointed I won so far. But you can't afford to mess around with losing momentum in that ground".

The ground was much firmer when Nightime was sent to England to contest the Coronation Stakes at Royal Ascot on 23 June. After turning into the straight in third place she faded quickly and was eased down by Smullen in the closing stages to finish last of the fifteen runners behind Nannina.

=== 2007: four-year-old season ===
After an absence of more than eleven months Nightime returned to the track and was matched against male opposition in the Tattersalls Gold Cup at the Curragh on 27 May. She started a 25/1 outsider and made little impact as she finished eighth of the nine runners behind Notnowcato.

== Breeding record ==
Nightime was retired from racing to become a broodmare for the Weld family. She has produced at least five winners including the multiple stakes winners Zhukova and Ghaiyyath:

- La Chapelle, a bay filly, foaled in 2008, sired by Holy Roman Emperor. Unplaced on only start.
- Sleeping Beauty, bay filly, 2010, by Oasis Dream. Won one race.
- New Years Night, chestnut colt (later gelded) 2011, by Raven's Pass. Won three races.
- Zhukova, bay filly, 2012, by Fastnet Rock. Won seven races including the Man o' War Stakes, Oyster Stakes, Alleged Stakes, Blue Wind Stakes, Enterprise Stakes and Noblesse Stakes.
- Jathab, chestnut colt, 2013, by Shamardal
- Midnight Fair, chestnut filly, 2014, by Raven's Pass. Won two races.
- Ghaiyyath, bay colt, 2015, by Dubawi. Won Autumn Stakes, Prix du Prince d'Orange, Prix d'Harcourt, Grosser Preis von Baden, Coronation Cup, Eclipse Stakes, International Stakes.
- Estrella, bay filly, 2016, by Zoffany. Failed to win in two races.
- Khaiz, chestnut colt, 2018, by Dubawi. Failed to win in four races.
- Al Nafir, chestnut colt (later gelded), 2019, by Dubawi. Won two races.
- Knight To King, bay colt, 2020, by Kingman. Won one race.
- Dubaji, bay colt, 2021, by Dubawi. Won one race.

== Pedigree ==
Pedigree of Nightime (IRE), chestnut filly, 2003
Sire Galileo (IRE) 1998	Sadler's Wells (USA); 1981	Northern Dancer	Nearctic
Sire Galileo (IRE) 1998	Sadler's Wells (USA); 1981	Northern Dancer	Natalma
Sire Galileo (IRE) 1998	Sadler's Wells (USA); 1981	Fairy Bridge	Bold Reason
Sire Galileo (IRE) 1998	Sadler's Wells (USA); 1981	Fairy Bridge	Special
Sire Galileo (IRE) 1998	Urban Sea (USA) ch. 1989	Miswaki	Mr. Prospector
Sire Galileo (IRE) 1998	Urban Sea (USA) ch. 1989	Miswaki	Hopespringseternal
Sire Galileo (IRE) 1998	Urban Sea (USA) ch. 1989	Allegretta	Lombard
Sire Galileo (IRE) 1998	Urban Sea (USA) ch. 1989	Allegretta	Anatevka
Dam Caumshinaun (IRE) 1997	Indian Ridge (IRE); 1985	Ahonoora	Lorenzaccio
Dam Caumshinaun (IRE) 1997	Indian Ridge (IRE); 1985	Ahonoora	Helen Nichols
Dam Caumshinaun (IRE) 1997	Indian Ridge (IRE); 1985	Hillbrow	Swing Easy
Dam Caumshinaun (IRE) 1997	Indian Ridge (IRE); 1985	Hillbrow	Golden City
Dam Caumshinaun (IRE) 1997	Ridge Pool (IRE); 1991	Bluebird	Storm Bird
Dam Caumshinaun (IRE) 1997	Ridge Pool (IRE); 1991	Bluebird	Ivory Dawn
Dam Caumshinaun (IRE) 1997	Ridge Pool (IRE); 1991	Casting Couch	Thatching
Dam Caumshinaun (IRE) 1997	Ridge Pool (IRE); 1991	Casting Couch	Drama (Family 20-c)
