= Jockey Club Derby Invitational Stakes =

- Class: Grade II
- Location: Belmont Park; Elmont, New York, United States
- Inaugurated: 2019
- Website: NYRA

Race information
- Distance: 1 3/8 miles
- Surface: Turf
- Track: Left-handed
- Qualification: Three-year-olds
- Weight: Colts & Geldings 122 lbs. Fillies 119 lbs.
- Purse: US$500,000 (since 2023)

The Jockey Club Derby Invitational Stakes is an American Grade II Thoroughbred horse race for three-year-olds run over a distance of one and three-eighths miles on the turf held annually in September at Belmont Park, Elmont, New York. The purse for the event is US$500,000.

== History ==
In 2019 the New York Racing Association with the influx of racino dollars created a new racing series for turf horses called the Turf Trinity. The Jockey Club Derby Invitational Stakes was positioned as the third and last leg of the new three race series held over the long distance of 1 1/2 miles with an impressive purse of US$1 million. The other events of the Turf Trinity are the Belmont Derby at Belmont Park and the Saratoga Derby at Saratoga. The winner originally earned an automatic berth to the Breeders' Cup Turf later in the racing season.

NYRA previously held an event for three-year-olds over the one and one-half miles distance on the turf in the fall known as the Lawrence Realization Stakes which at one time held Grade II status and attracted many fine three-year-old stayers including Halo, Mac Diarmida and Golden Act. The event was discontinued in 2005.

The inaugural running on 8 September 2019 was won by the American-bred Spanish Mission who was based in England. Spanish Mission defeated eight other entrants winning by the shortest of margins, a nose over the French-bred Pedro Cara with the Irish-bred San Huberto in third. Spanish Mission returned to England and in 2020 was successful in winning the Listed Chester Stakes over a distance of 1 13/16 miles and the Group 2 Doncaster Cup held over the even longer distance of about 2 1/4 miles. Later, Spanish Mission travelled to Australia for the 2021 running of the Group 1 Melbourne Cup and finished third to the Australian champion Verry Elleegant.

In 2020 due to the COVID-19 pandemic in the United States, NYRA did not schedule the event in their updated and reformatted fall meeting.

In the 2021 renewal of the event seven entrants competed with the Godolphin's British-bred gelding Yibir victorious. Yibir in his next start won the Breeders' Cup Turf at Del Mar Racetrack and was awarded the Eclipse Award for US Champion Male Turf Horse.

With the outstanding quality the event displayed, the American Graded Stakes Committee in 2022 upgraded the classification of the event to Grade III. Also the event in 2022 was moved to Aqueduct Racetrack due to infield tunnel and redevelopment work at Belmont Park. The event was won by the Irish-bred Nations Pride, who broke a track record that was set by Pebbles back in 1985 in a time of 2:24.14 with a 6 1/4-length victory.

In 2023 NYRA shortened the distance of the Jockey Club Derby Invitational to 1 3/8 miles and reduced its purse to $500,000. That year's race was ultimately moved to the dirt and run at 1 1/4 miles because of heavy rain and downgraded to Listed status.

In 2025 the event was upgraded to Grade II by the Thoroughbred Owners and Breeders Association.

== Records ==
Speed record:

- 1 1/2 miles: 2:24.14 – Nations Pride (IRE) (2022) (new track record at Aqueduct)

Margins:

- 6 1/4 lengths – Nations Pride (IRE) (2022)

Most wins by an owner:

- 2 – Godolphin Racing (2021, 2022)

Most wins by a jockey:

- 2 – Jamie Spencer (2019, 2021)

Most wins by a trainer:

- 2 – Charlie Appleby (2021, 2022)

== Winners ==
Year	Winner	Jockey	Trainer	Owner	Distance	Time	Purse	Grade	Ref
At Aqueduct
2025	Asbury Park (GB)	Manuel Franco	Chad C. Brown	Peter M. Brant & St. Elias Stable	1 3/8 miles	2:14.45	$500,000	II	
2024	Carson's Run	Dylan Davis	Christophe Clement	West Point Thoroughbreds & Steven Bouchey	1 3/8 miles	2:14.22	$500,000	III	
2023	Lost Ark	Kendrick Carmouche	Todd A. Pletcher	Harrell Ventures	1 1/4 miles	2:03.97	$485,000	Listed	
2022	Nations Pride (IRE)	Frankie Dettori	Charlie Appleby	Godolphin Racing	1 1/2 miles	2:24.14	$955,000	III	
At Belmont Park
2021	Yibir (GB)	Jamie Spencer	Charlie Appleby	Godolphin Racing	1 1/2 miles	2:26.23	$980,000		
2020	Race not held								
2019	Spanish Mission	Jamie Spencer	David Simcock	Earle I. Mack & Team Valor	1 1/2 miles	2:27.58	$1,000,000		

Legend:
Turf Dirt

== See also ==
- List of American and Canadian Graded races
