= Saratoga Derby Stakes =

- Class: Grade I
- Location: Saratoga Race Course; Saratoga Springs, New York, United States
- Inaugurated: First establishment: 1904–1906 (as Saratoga Derby); Reestablished: 2019
- Website: NYRA

Race information
- Distance: 1 3/16 miles
- Surface: Turf
- Track: Left-handed
- Qualification: Three-year-olds
- Weight: Colts & Geldings 122 lbs. Fillies 119 lbs.
- Purse: US$750,000 (since 2025)
- Bonuses: Automatic qualification to GI W. S. Cox Plate (AUS)

The Saratoga Derby Stakes is an American Grade I stakes race Thoroughbred horse race for three-year-olds run over a distance of one and three-sixteenths miles on the turf held annually in August at Saratoga Race Course in Saratoga Springs, New York. The purse for the event is US$750,000.

== History ==
=== First years ===
The inaugural running of the event known as the Saratoga Derby was on 13 August 1904 run as the fourth race on the day's card over a distance of 1 5/16 miles on the dirt track. The event was won by James R. Keene's 1904 Belmont Stakes winner Delhi starting as 2/9 odds-on favorite who led from start to finish in a small three horse field defeating the entry of Stalwart and St. Valentine in a time of 2:13 2/5. The second running was won by the Cairngorm who earlier in the spring had won the 1905 Preakness Stakes which was held at Gravesend Race Track. The event only attracted four runners but the winning margin was a close neck in a time of 2:18 flat. The third and last running in 1906 was won by the favorite Accountant who defeated Gallavant and McKittredge. At that time the event was richer than the Travers Stakes and Accountant was the top stakes earner for the year with $81,925 for owner Diamond Jim Brady.

The entrance into the event, with additional declaration fees needed to be paid when horses were still two-year-olds was a burden which curtailed the number of horses that would start in the event. The event was not held after 1906.

=== Renewal ===
In 2019 the New York Racing Association with the influx of racino dollars created a new racing series for turf horses called the Turf Trinity. The Saratoga Derby Invitational Stakes was positioned as the second leg of the new three race series with the first running on 21 July 2019 over a distance of 1 3/16 miles with an impressive purse of US$1 million. In 2020 due to the COVID-19 pandemic in the United States, NYRA cut the purse to $500,000 meeting. The other events of the Turf Trinity are the Belmont Derby and the Jockey Club Derby at Belmont Park.

For 2021 the Thoroughbred Owners and Breeders Association's American Graded Stakes Committee upgraded the classification of the event to the highest status of Grade I. The 2021 winner, the Irish-bred State Of Rest confirmed the high classification of the event by later in the year travelling to Australia and winning the Group 1 Weight for age W. S. Cox Plate and the following year winning the Group 1 Prince of Wales's Stakes at Royal Ascot.

== Records ==
Speed record:

- 1 3/16 miles: 1:52.02 A Thread of Blue (2019)

Margins:

- 1 3/4 lengths – Nations Pride (IRE) (2022)

Most wins by an owner:

- 2 – Klaravich Stables (2020, 2023)

Most wins by a trainer:

- 2 – Chad C. Brown (2020, 2023)

Most wins by a jockey:

- No jockey has won the event more than once

== Winners ==
Year	Winner	Jockey	Trainer	Owner	Distance	Time	Purse	Ref
Saratoga Derby Stakes
2026	Glacius (GB)	Luis Saez	Hugo Palmer	Vefa Ibrahim Araci	1 3/16 miles	1:53.22	$750,000	
Saratoga Derby Invitational Stakes
2025	World Beater	Jaime Torres	Riley Mott	Pin Oak Stud	1 3/16 miles	1:52.82	$750,000	
2024	Carson's Run	Dylan Davis	Christophe Clement	Steven Bouchey & West Point Thoroughbreds	1 3/16 miles	1:55.81	$600,000	
2023	Program Trading (GB)	Flavien Prat	Chad C. Brown	Klaravich Stables	1 3/16 miles	1:56.63	$600,000	
2022	Nations Pride (IRE)	William Buick	Charlie Appleby	Godolphin	1 3/16 miles	1:54.72	$1,000,000	
2021	State Of Rest (IRE)	John R. Velazquez	Joseph Patrick O'Brien	Teme Valley	1 3/16 miles	1:53.35	$1,000,000	
2020	Domestic Spending (GB)	Irad Ortiz Jr.	Chad C. Brown	Klaravich Stables	1 3/16 miles	1:52.52	$500,000	
2019	A Thread of Blue	Luis Saez	Kiaran P. McLaughlin	Leonard C. Green	1 3/16 miles	1:52.02	$1,000,000	
1907–2018		Race not held						
Saratoga Derby
1906	Accountant	Jack Martin	Matthew M. Allen	James Buchanan Brady	1 5/16 miles	2:16.40	$9,670	
1905	Cairngorm	Willie Davis	A. Jack Joyner	Sydney Paget	1 5/16 miles	2:18.00	$7,885	
1904	Delhi	George M. Odom	James G. Rowe Sr.	James R. Keene	1 5/16 miles	2:13.40	$10,285	

Legend:
Dirt Turf

== See also ==
- List of American and Canadian Graded races
