= Belmont Park =

Horse racing track in Elmont, New York, US

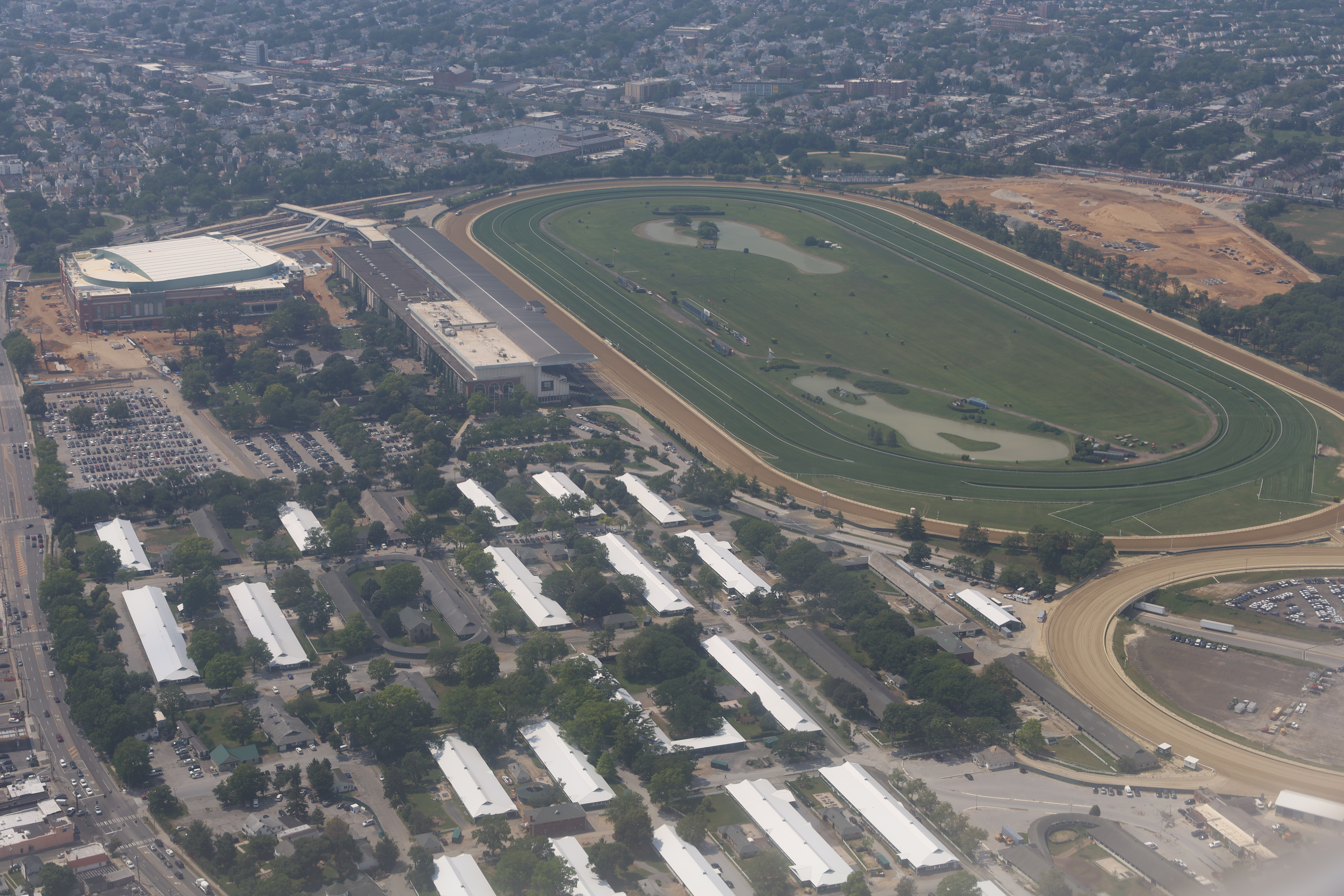
- Aerial view of Belmont Park in 2021
- Interactive map of Belmont Park
- Location: 2150 Hempstead Turnpike; Elmont, New York 11003; United States
- Coordinates: 40°42′54″N 73°43′22″W
- Owned by: State of New York
- Operated by: New York Racing Association
- Date opened: May 4, 1905 (121 years ago); May 20, 1968 (58 years ago) (first renovation); September 18, 2026 (52 days ago) (second renovation)
- Capacity: 50,000
- Screened on: SportsNet New York (restricted to cable systems in New York City, Northern/Central New Jersey, and Fairfield County, Connecticut); Capital OTB via WXXA Channel 23.2); NYRA.com/NYRA Now app (Internet); Fox Sports 2; Fox Sports 1
- Course type: Flat/Thoroughbred; 1.5 miles (2.4 km)
- Notable races: Belmont Derby; Belmont Oaks; Belmont Stakes

Belmont Park is a Thoroughbred racetrack in Elmont, New York, United States, just east of New York City limits. It is one of the most well known racetracks in the country, as it hosts the Belmont Stakes, the final leg of the American Triple Crown. The original structure opened on May 4, 1905, and was demolished in 1963. A second grandstand opened in 1968 and was demolished in 2024. The third iteration of Belmont Park opened in September 2026.

Operated by the New York Racing Association (NYRA), Belmont Park is typically open for racing from late April through mid-July (known as the Spring meet), and again from mid-September through late October (the Fall meet). The race park's main dirt track has earned the nickname, "the Big Sandy", given its prominent overall dimensions (1 1/2 miles (2.4 km)) and the deep, sometimes tiring surface. Belmont is also sometimes known as "The Championship Track" because almost every major champion in racing history since the early 20th century has competed on the racecourse – including all of the Triple Crown winners. Belmont Park, with its large, wide, sweeping turns and long homestretch, is considered one of the fairest racetracks in America.

Belmont hosted its largest crowd at the 2004 Belmont Stakes, when 120,139 spectators saw Smarty Jones upset by Birdstone in his Triple Crown bid.

== History ==
=== First Belmont Park (1903–1963) ===
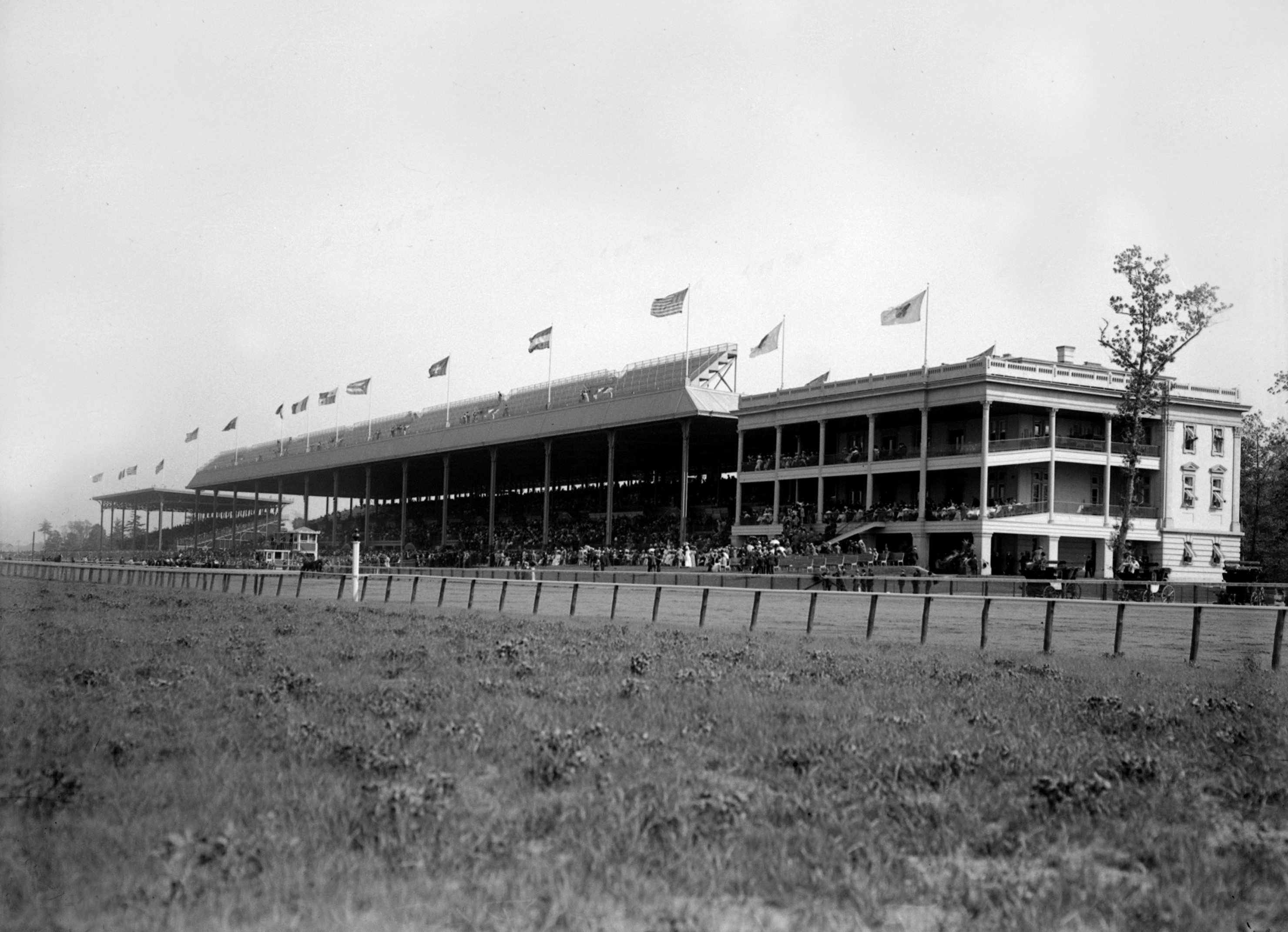
Belmont Park Clubhouse and Grandstand in 1905

August Belmont Jr. and William Collins Whitney, along with other investors, built the original Belmont race track, which opened on May 4, 1905. Arthur Underhill was hired as Engineer and Landscape Architect to design and oversee construction of the park. In its first 15 or so years, Belmont Park featured racing clockwise, in the "English fashion"—allowing the upper-class members of the racing association and their guests to have the races finish in front of the clubhouse, just to the west of the grandstand. A "field stand," at what was then the top of the stretch, was located east of the grandstand. The original finish line was located at the top of the present-day homestretch. In his 1925 book, "The Big Town", Ring W. Lardner refers to the then-recent directional change when he has a character at Belmont say (speaking of a recent race) "At that time, they run the wrong way of the track, like you would deal cards".

A later innovation was created by Joseph E. Widener, who took over track leadership when August Belmont II died in 1924: the Widener Chute. It was a straightaway of just under 7 furlongs (1.4 km) that cut diagonally through Belmont's training and main tracks, hitting near the quarter-pole of the main track; the course was removed in 1958.

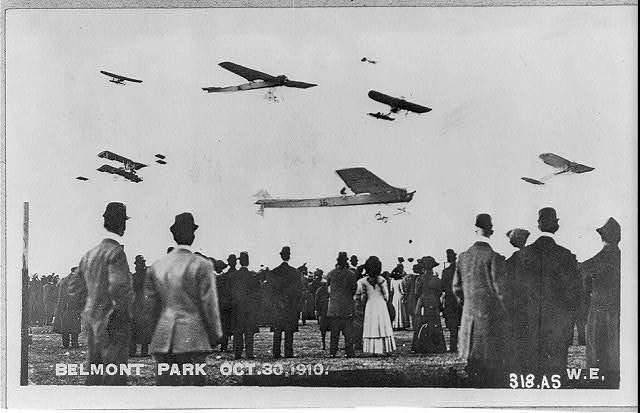
A crowd watching seven planes in the air at the Belmont Park air show, New York on October 30, 1910

Glenn Curtiss monoplane at Belmont Park meet with Eugene Burton Ely at wheel in 1910

Two features of the original Belmont Park remain today. The first is the display of four stone pillars on Hempstead Turnpike, a gift from the mayor and park commissioners of Charleston, South Carolina. The pillars had stood at the entrance of the Washington Course of the South Carolina Jockey Club in Charleston, which operated from 1792 to 1882. The stone pillars are now found at the clubhouse entrance. Lesser known but more visible are the racing motif iron railings seen partially bordering the walking ring. The railings, used as decoration on the south side of the old Belmont grandstand, were salvaged during the 1963 demolition.

The original Belmont Park was not only unprecedented in its size but also had the then-new innovation of a Long Island Rail Road extension from the Queens Village station, running along the property, tunneling under Hempstead Turnpike, then terminating on the south side of the property. The train terminal was moved to its present location north of the turnpike after the 1956 season.

Near the railroad terminal was yet another track—Belmont Park Terminal, a steeplechase course operated by United Hunts until 1927.

The last race at the old Belmont Park was run in October 1962. In spring 1963, NYRA Chairman James Cox Brady announced that two separate engineering surveys found the grandstand/clubhouse was unsafe due to age-induced structural defects and needed to be rebuilt. The book Belmont Park: A Century of Champions noted the comment of NYRA President Edward T. Dickinson: "When you sighted down the stands, you could see some of the beams were twisted. They were in something of an S-shape."

The old structure was demolished in 1963, along with the Manice Mansion, the turreted 19th-century homestead that served as the headquarters of Belmont's Turf and Field Club.

==== Aviation meets ====
In addition to racing history, Belmont Park made history in another industry native to the Hempstead Plains – aviation. Some 150,000 people were drawn to the track on October 30, 1910, at the climax of a Wright Brothers-staged International Aviation Meet at Belmont Park, which had started eight years earlier. The event came at the beginning of a period from 1910 to 1912 in which racing was outlawed in New York State.

Eight years later, Belmont and aviation were reunited when the racetrack served as the northern point of the first U.S. air mail route, between the New York area and Washington, D.C.

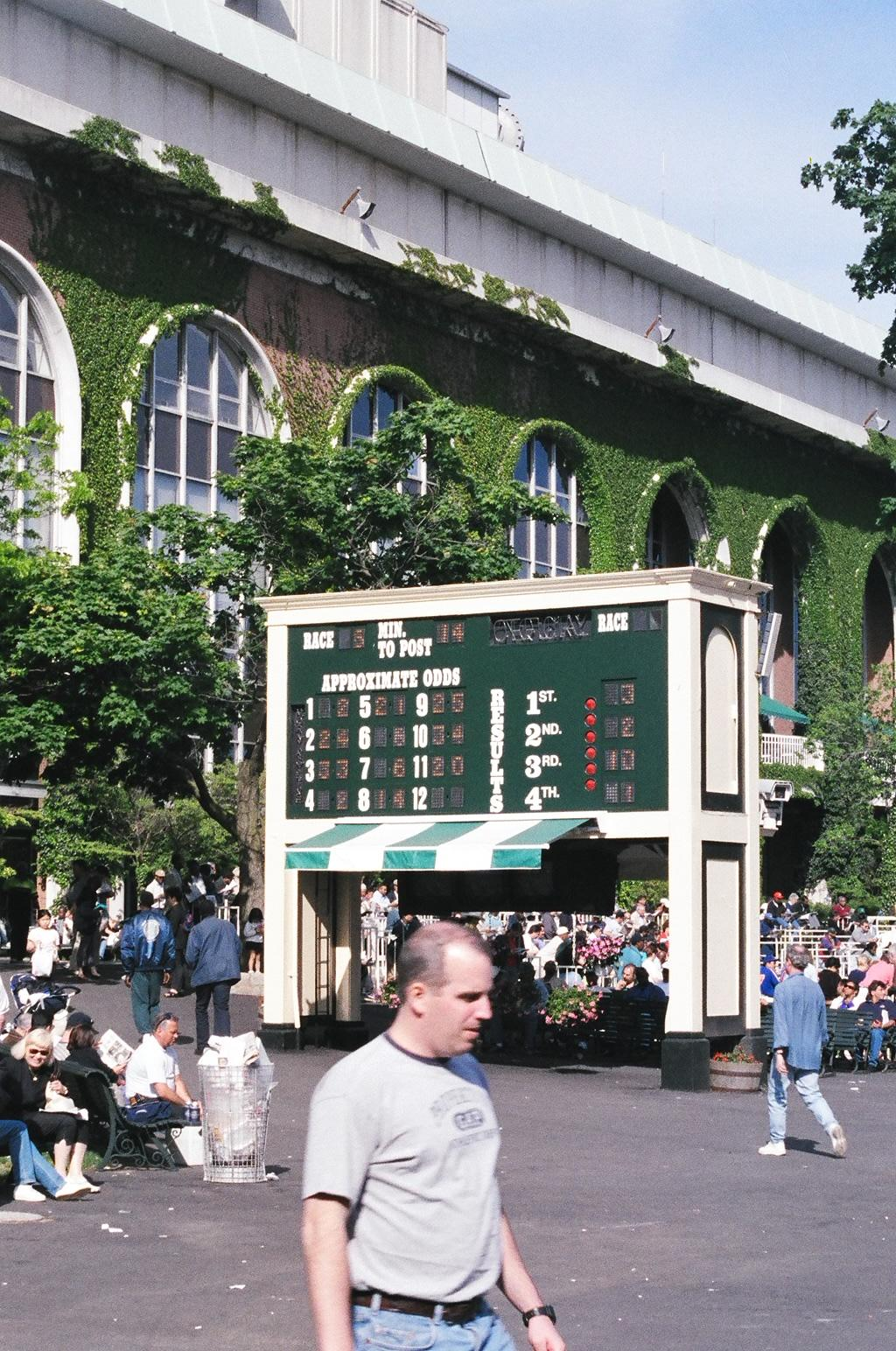
Exterior and tote board in 1999. The tote board was later changed to a digital tote and TV display.

=== Second Belmont Park (1968–2024) ===
The Belmont race meetings were moved to Aqueduct Racetrack in South Ozone Park, Queens from 1963 to 1968. During this period, the second grandstand was built and the Inner Turf Course was also added.

The $30.7 million grandstand, designed by Arthur Froehlich, was opened May 20, 1968, and was the largest in Thoroughbred racing. It had a total attendance capacity of more than 100,000, including a seating capacity of 33,000 and an adjoining backyard being able to accommodate more than 10,000.

A long mural by Pierre Bellocq on the second floor of the clubhouse featuring the dominant jockeys, trainers and racing personalities celebrates the track's history.

In May 2007, New York Governor Eliot Spitzer considered closing Aqueduct Racetrack located ten miles west of Belmont in Ozone Park, New York, and turning Belmont into a nearly year-round race track when the New York Racing Association lease for all three of New York State's tracks expired at the end of 2007. Belmont's stands would have been heated, additional barns built for Aqueduct's 400 horses, and the track modified to accommodate winter racing. In addition, video lottery machines would have been introduced. A new entity would have operated Belmont from fall to spring while the New York Racing Association would continue to operate Saratoga Race Course in the summer. Spitzer was forced to resign amid a prostitution scandal in March 2008 and no further plans for Belmont were developed at that time.

In December 2022, the New York Racing Association formally announced its intention to upgrade the facilities at Belmont to make it suitable to host year-round thoroughbred racing and training. Unlike Churchill and Pimlico, neither the first nor second iterations of Belmont Park allowed spectators into the infield. An infield tunnel connecting to the backstretch parking lot has been completed.

Beginning in April 2023 construction of a one-mile synthetic racing oval inside the inner turf course had begun. The next phase of reconstruction, which began after the 2023 spring and summer meet, included completion of the synthetic track, widening of the inner turf course, and construction of a second infield tunnel near the first turn. NYRA released a statement on May 1, 2023, announcing that state funding for the grandstand reconstruction and other projects had been secured by way of a $455 million loan.

Belmont Park Redevelopment
List of numbered map items:
1 Elmont–UBS Arena LIRR Station
2 Belmont Park LIRR station
3 Grandstand
4 UBS Arena
5 Hotel (proposed)
6 Belmont Park Garage
7 Belmont Park Village

The final day of racing at the second Belmont Park was held on July 9, 2023.

Demolition began in March 2024 and was completed in June 2024.

==== UBS Arena ====
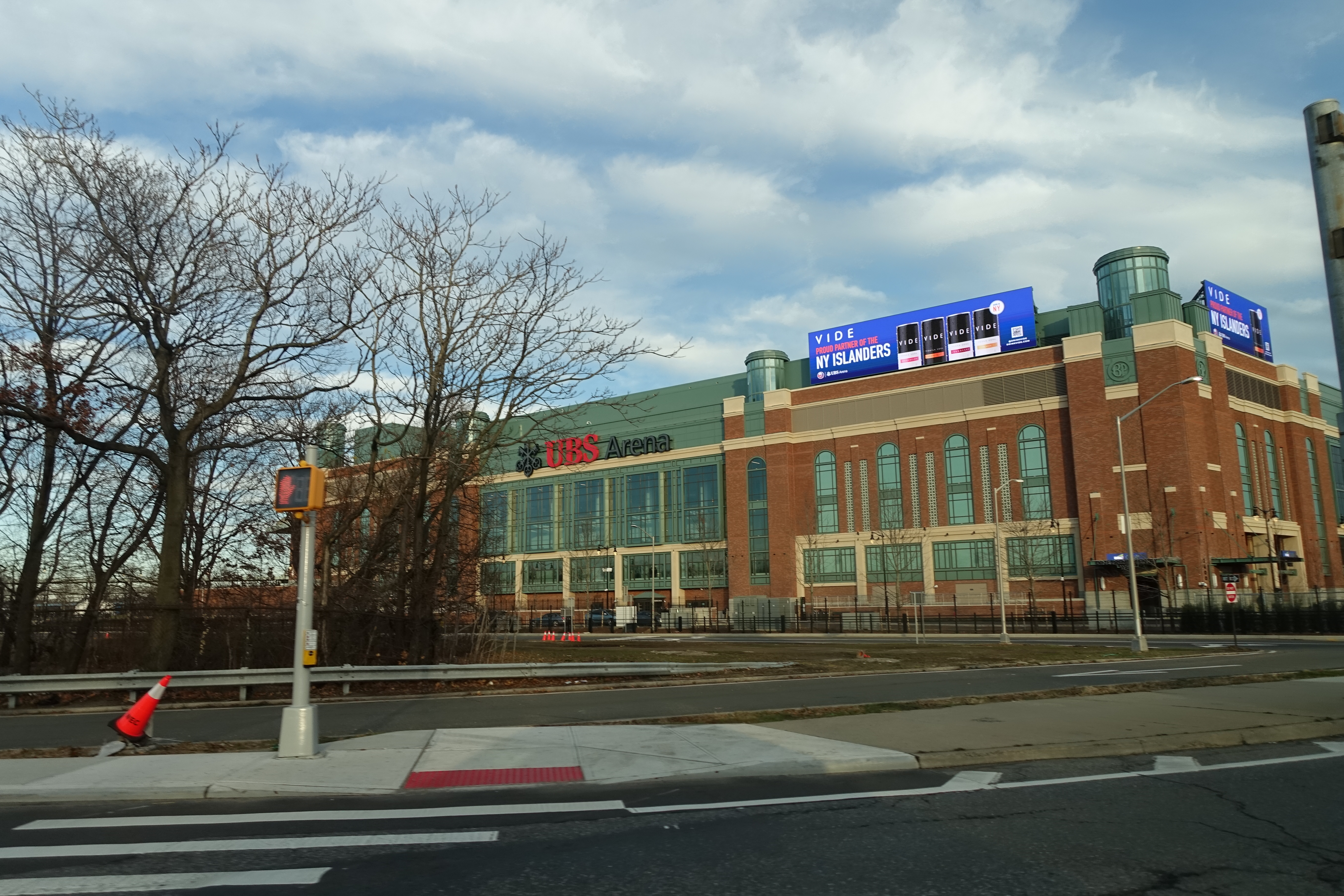
UBS Arena in 2021. It was originally a parking lot before the arena was built.

In July 2017, New York State officials announced that vacant parking lots behind the Belmont grandstand had been put to tender for two area top-level professional sports teams: the New York Islanders, an NHL ice hockey team; and New York City FC, an MLS soccer team. Both teams were unhappy with their current locations (the Islanders at Barclays Center; New York City FC at Yankee Stadium) and proposed to redevelop the land into their own stadiums. The Islanders proposed an 18,000 seat sports arena, 435,000 square feet (40,400 m^{2}) for retail development, a 225-room hotel, and a 10,000 sq ft (930 m^{2}) community center, while NYCFC's pledge included a 26,000 seat soccer ground, 400,000 sq ft (37,000 m^{2}) for retail, a 5.2-acre (2.1 ha) community park, and 2-acre (0.81 ha) soccer complex: both proposals were fully privately funded and included improved parking and LIRR facilities as well.

On December 20, 2017, New York Governor Andrew Cuomo announced that the Islanders project had won approval to be built. In July 2019, the plan was adopted by the Empire State Development Corporation board, and UBS Arena opened in time for the 2021-22 NHL season. The plan also included a new Elmont station on the LIRR, in addition to the hotel, arena, and Belmont Park Village.

Located next to UBS Arena, Belmont Park Village is an open-air luxury outlet mall within the grounds of Belmont Park.

=== Third Belmont Park (2026–present) ===
By July 2024, the second Belmont Park was completely demolished. To accommodate construction, NYRA moved the Belmont fall meet to nearby Aqueduct Racetrack from 2022 to 2025. The 2024 Belmont Stakes, 2025 Belmont Stakes, and 2026 Belmont Stakes were also moved, with those races being held at Saratoga Race Course instead.

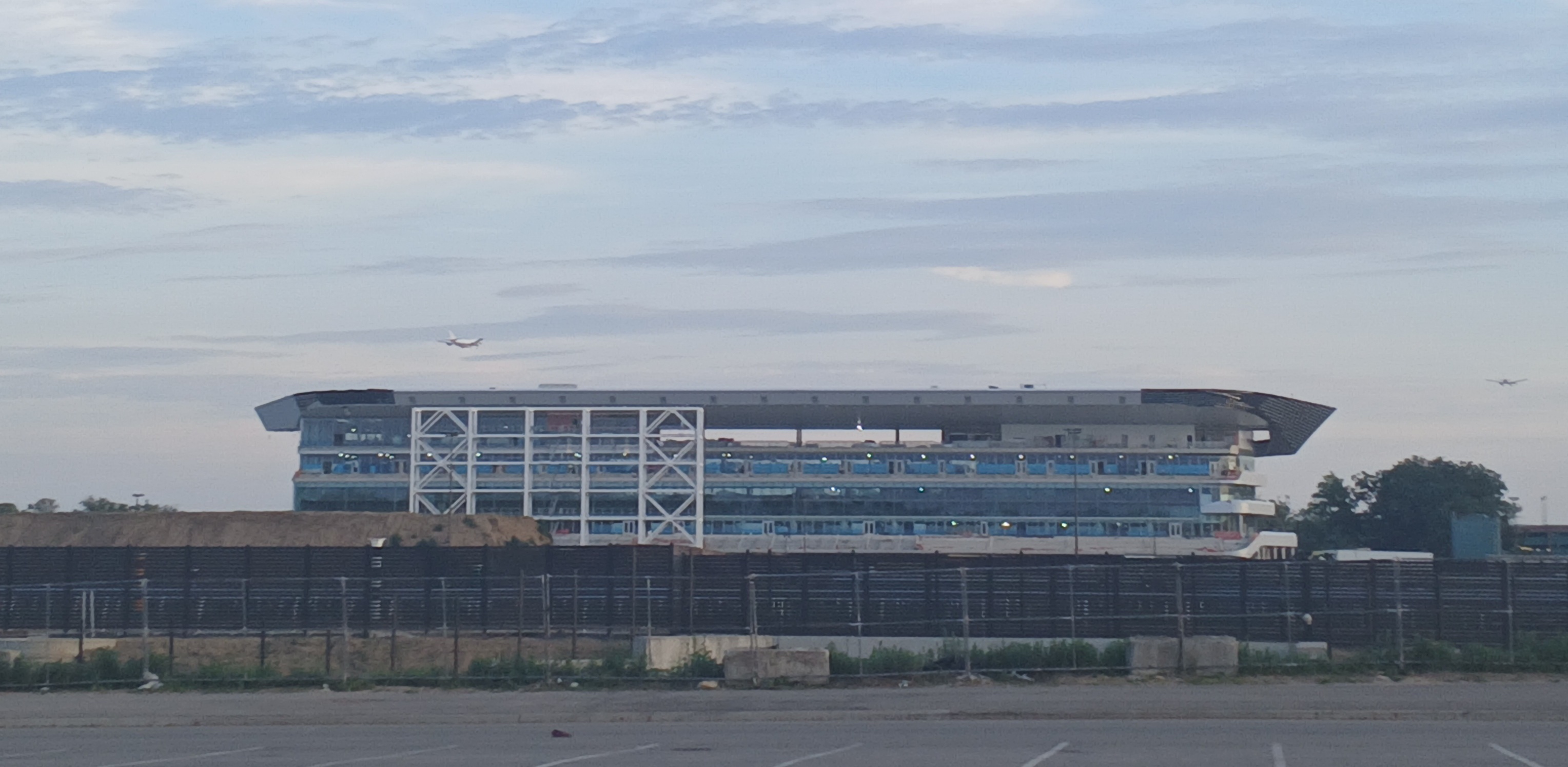
The third Belmont Park under construction in June 2026.

By February 2025, the foundation for the new grandstand had been poured. By May 2025, pouring for the concrete and steel shell of the new grandstand was underway. The outlines for the new dirt, turf and synthetic courses had been set, with plans for the turf courses to be of shorter circumference and the finish line moved forward by 125 feet compared to previous course configurations.

The reconstructed Belmont Park also consolidated its operations with those of Aqueduct, which held its final races on June 28, 2026, before shutting down. Belmont Park reopened with its third grandstand on September 18, 2026. The new grandstand has a seating capacity of between 7,500 and 10,000 people.

The new Belmont Park is scheduled to host the 2027 Breeders' Cup, the first Breeders' Cup at Belmont since 2005.

== Physical attributes ==
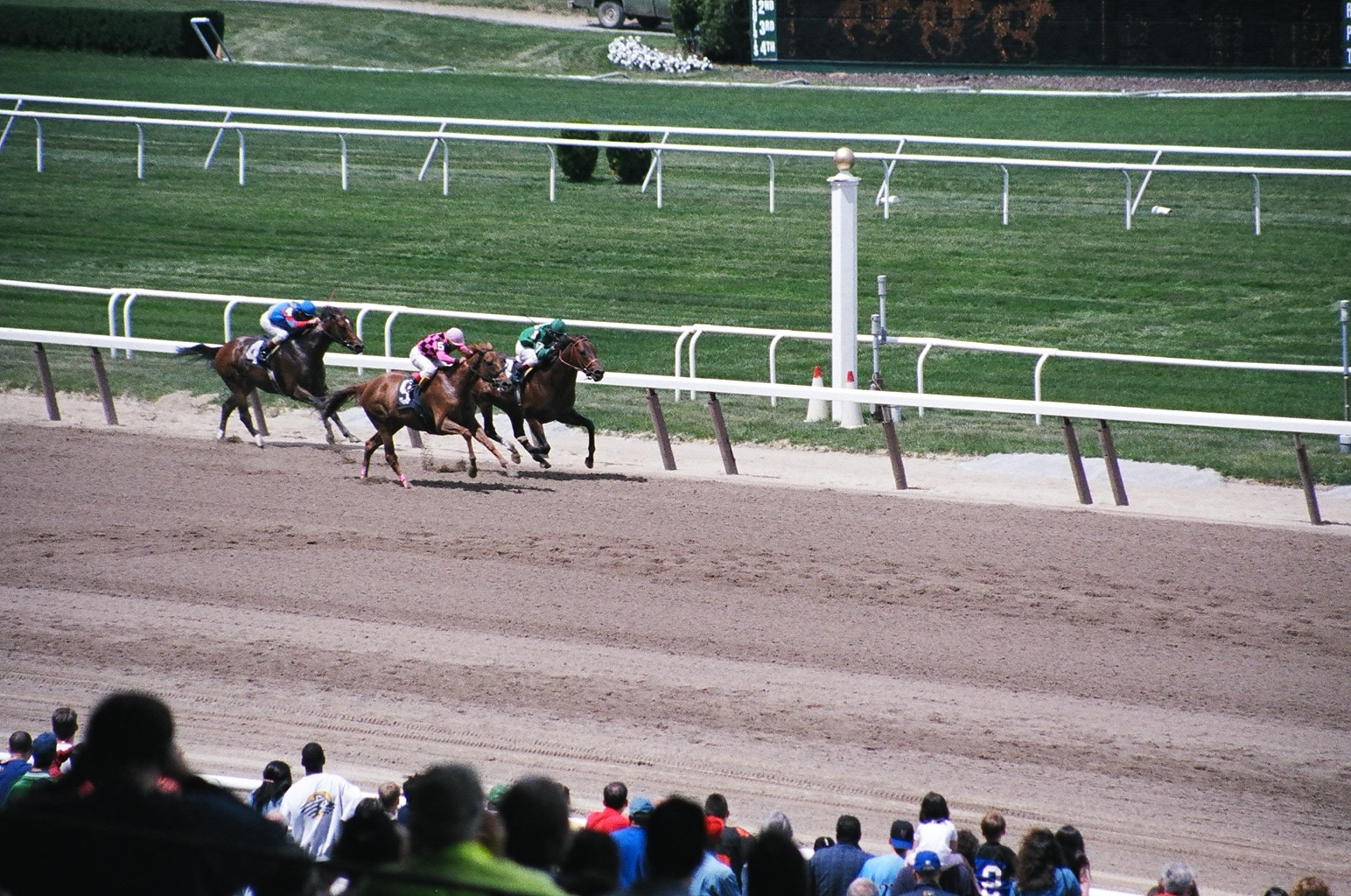
Horses race down the stretch on Belmont Park's main track in 1999

The 430-acre (170 ha) racing, training and barn complex is located on the western edge of the Nassau County region known as the Hempstead Plains. Just a few miles east on the same plains, the first racing meet in North America was held in 1665, supervised by colonial governor Richard Nicolls.

As of its September 2026 reopening, Belmont Park has four distinct courses for racing:

- Main Track: a 1 1/2-mile dirt course.
- Widener Turf Course: a grass course measuring about 1 1/4 miles in circumference and 102 feet wide. Named after the Widener family, which includes former Jockey Club chairman George D. Widener Jr.
- Inner Turf Course: a grass course measuring slightly over 1 1/8 miles in circumference and 100 feet wide.
- Tapeta Course: a one-mile synthetic Tapeta track. Used during winter racing, as well as the primary surface used when races are taken off the turf.

The home stretch of the main track is 1,223 feet (373 m), which is almost as long as the home stretch of Churchill Downs. The stretch was lengthened by 126 feet during renovations compared to the previous configuration.

Additionally, a 1 mile (1.6 km) dirt training track abuts the east end of the main track. In March 2009, lights were added to the training track as a safety measure to prevent early morning workouts from occurring in the dark.

== Geopolitical status ==
Location in Nassau County, New York, just outside New York City.

The racetrack, grandstand, training, and barn facilities are located entirely in the community of Elmont in Nassau County, New York. According to the City of New York's own map portal, the Long Island Rail Road station on the property, the ramp between the grandstand and the train station, and some of the adjoining parking fields straddle the Queens County line.

Belmont Park has direct on- and off-ramps to the Cross Island Parkway, which runs north–south and is just to the west of the park. Belmont Park's physical address is given as 2150 Hempstead Turnpike (New York State Route 24).

The Belmont Park property originally totaled some 650 acres (260 ha). After the 1956 season, the construction of a wider bus road beyond the main course's final turn forced the turn to be shortened. According to the Belmont publication commemorating the track's 1968 reopening, that move cut 96 feet (29 m) off its circumference. The current layout has the entire racing course inside Nassau County.

== Racing ==
=== Belmont Stakes ===
The Belmont Stakes was named after financier and sportsman August Belmont Sr., who helped fund the race, and most sources say the racetrack itself was also named for him.

The race was first run in 1867 at Jerome Park Racetrack in the Bronx. In 1937, the wrought iron gates that bore an illustration of that first Belmont Stakes were donated to Belmont Park by August Belmont II's sole surviving son, Perry Belmont. The gates were located on the fourth floor of Belmont Park's clubhouse until the 2024 demolition.

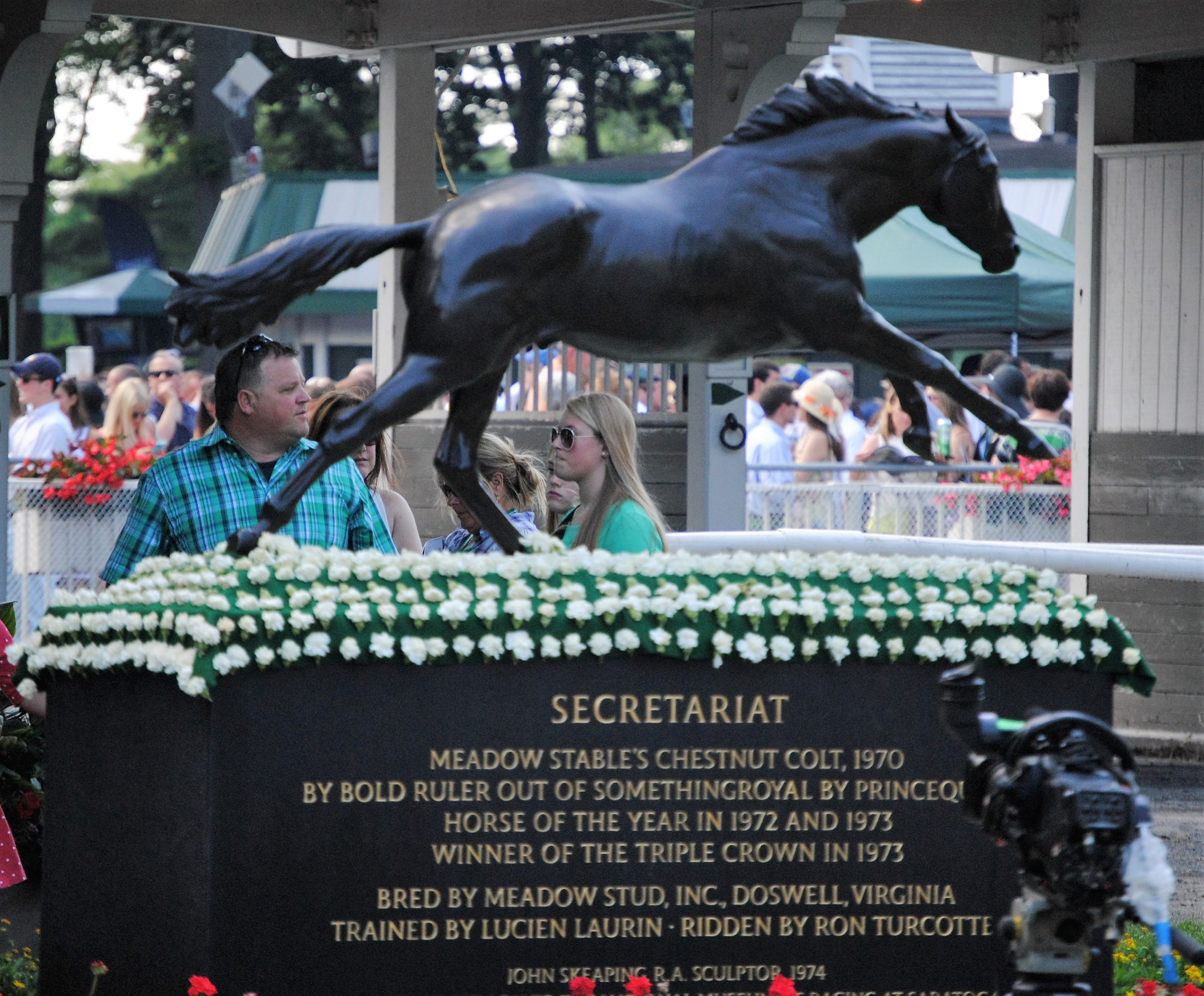
A statue of Secretariat stands in the middle of the walking ring

The Belmont Stakes races have been run at Belmont Park since 1905, with the exceptions of 1911–12, when gambling was banned in New York State; the 1963–1967 editions, held at Aqueduct while the grandstands at Belmont Park were reconstructed; and the 2024–2026 editions, which were held at Saratoga Race Course due to the second reconstruction of Belmont Park.

Secretariat's finishing time in his 1973 Belmont victory (2 minutes, 24 seconds) set a world record for 1 1/2 miles (2.4 km) on dirt, a world record which still stands. The 31-length victory clinched the first Triple Crown in 25 years, dating back to Citation in 1948. A statue of Secretariat is in the center of the Belmont paddock.

Another Belmont Stakes achievement is recognized by the "Woody's Corner" display that was located in the first-floor clubhouse lobby, commemorating the five consecutive Belmont Stakes winners trained by Woody Stephens from 1982 to 1986.

The racetrack was also the site of Affirmed's epic stretch duel with Alydar in the 1978 Belmont Stakes, a victory that gave Affirmed the Triple Crown; and Triple Crown winner Seattle Slew's defeat of Affirmed in the Marlboro Cup in September of that same year.

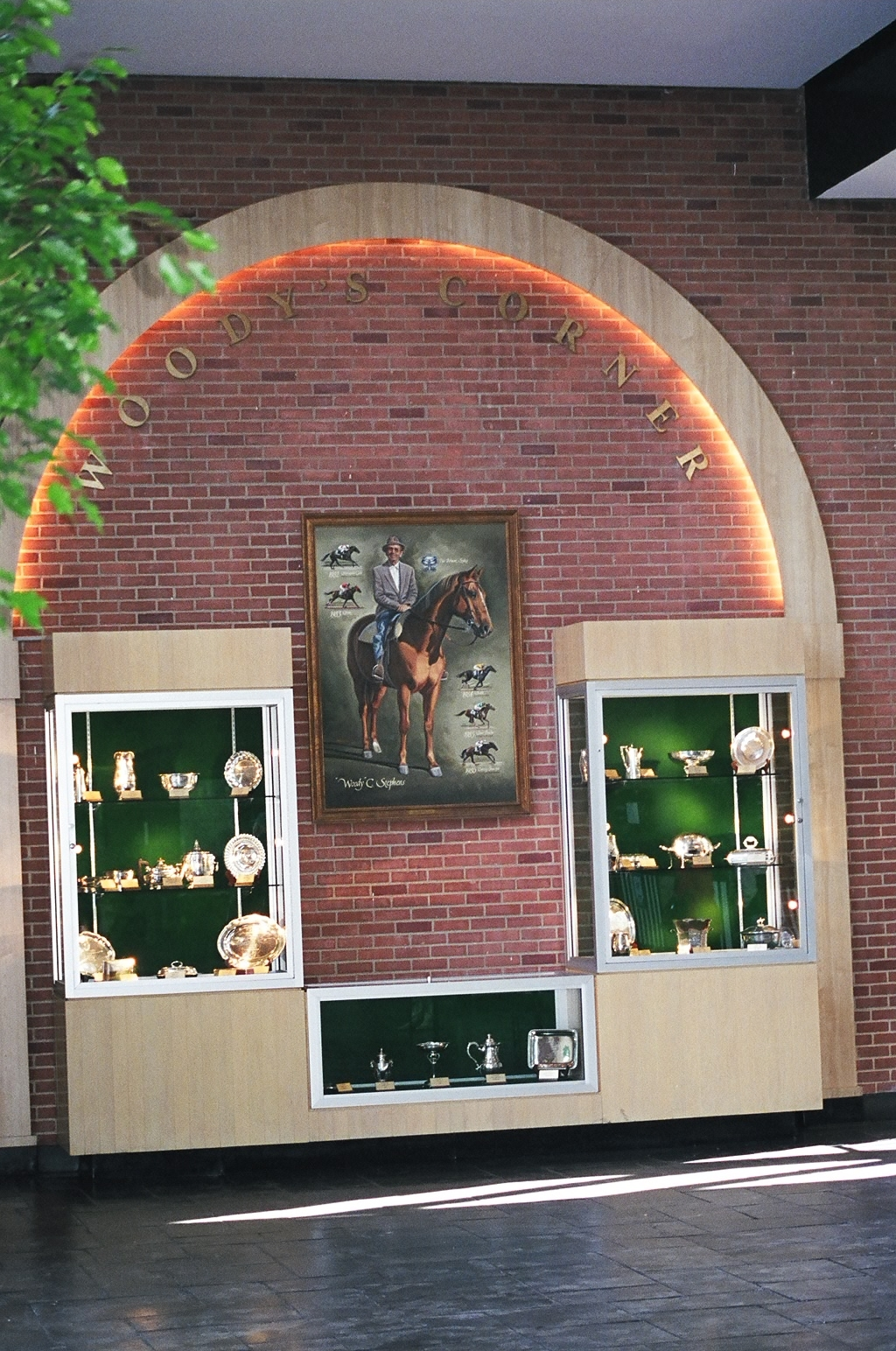
The "Woody's Corner" display in the first-floor clubhouse lobby of the 2nd Belmont Park (1968–2024) commemorated the five consecutive Belmont Stakes winners trained by Woody Stephens from 1982 to 1986.

Officials of the New York Racing Association made a concerted effort to boost attendance on Belmont Stakes Day after the 1995 installment drew only 37,171.

The 2000 and 2001 Belmonts—both run when there was no Triple Crown on the line—drew announced crowds of 67,810 and 73,857.

In 2004, a record attendance of 120,139 was on hand to see if Smarty Jones would be the first Triple Crown winner since 1978.

American Pharoah won the 2015 Belmont Stakes on June 6, and became the first Triple Crown winner in 37 years. It was announced before the race that attendance would be capped at 90,000. That year's Kentucky Derby and Preakness both set attendance records, over 170,000 and 130,000 respectively.

=== Other key races at Belmont ===
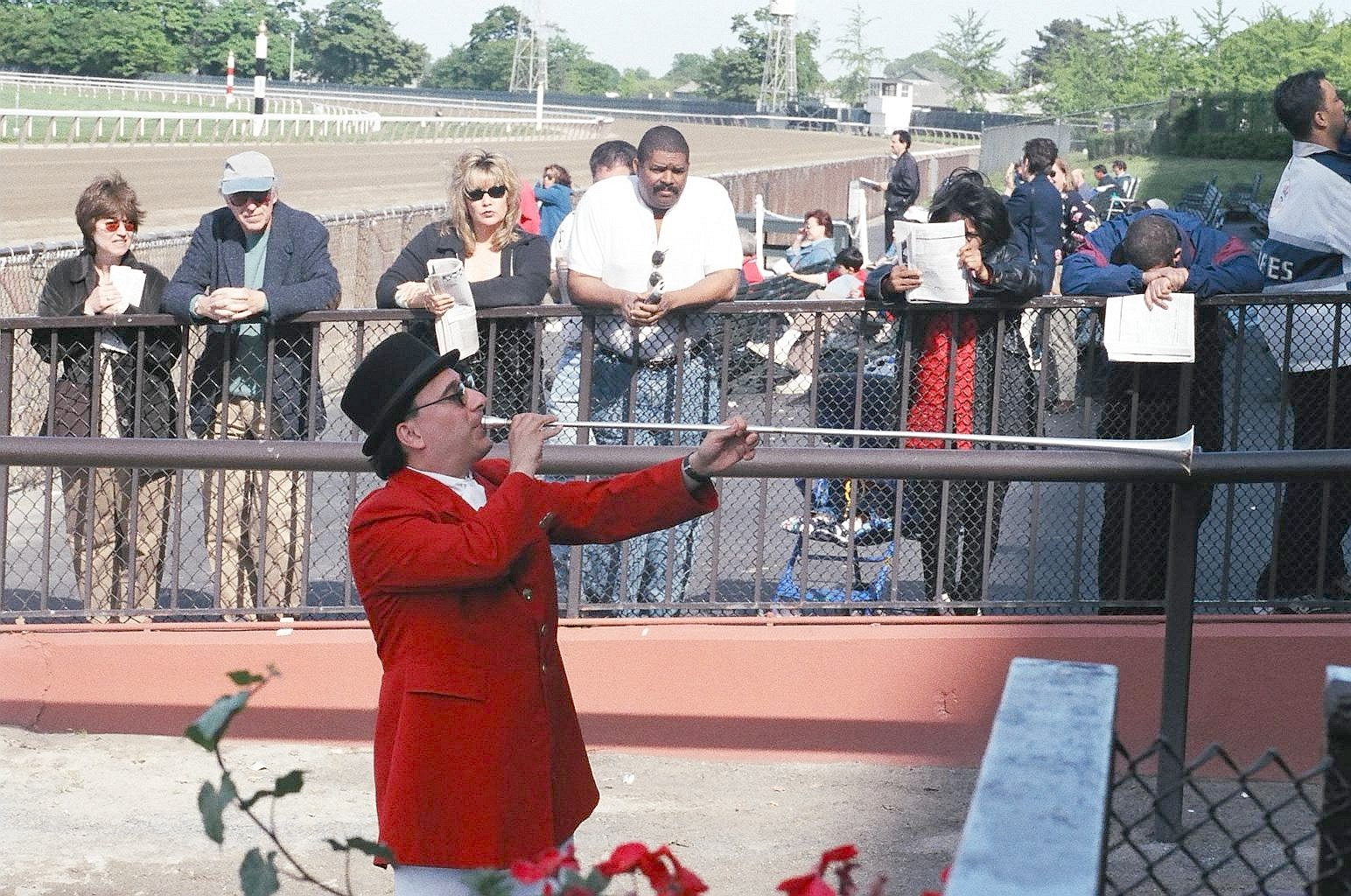
NYRA bugler Sam Grossman plays "Call to the Post", heralding the horses as they enter the track before a race at Belmont Park.

In addition to the Belmont Stakes, other major races held at Belmont have included the Jockey Club Gold Cup, the Suburban Handicap and the Memorial Day standby—the Metropolitan Handicap, also known as the "Met Mile."

An important race for fillies, the Acorn Stakes, which is the first leg of the US Triple Tiara, is raced at the track year.

All of the above races are contested on dirt; notable turf (grass) races include the Belmont Derby, Belmont Oaks, Manhattan Handicap, Just A Game Handicap, Bowling Green Handicap, Man O' War Stakes, Flower Bowl Invitational Stakes and the Joe Hirsch Turf Classic Invitational.

Belmont's Fall Championship meet includes New York Showcase Day in late October, with seven stakes races for New York-bred horses. The richest race on that program is the $250,000 Empire Classic Handicap.

Other memorable performances in Belmont Park history include the opening of the track in 1905 with the famous dead heat between Sysonby and Race King in the Met Cap. In 1923, Belmont Park was host to an international duel between the American and English champions: Zev, winner of the Kentucky Derby, against Papyrus, winner of The Derby. Zev won by five lengths in front of an estimated crowd of 70,000.

Belmont Park was the site of the tragedy-marred victory of Foolish Pleasure over champion filly Ruffian in a 1975 match race. Ruffian broke down during the race and had to be euthanized. She was buried near the finish line in the infield at Belmont Park, her nose pointed towards the finish pole, from 1975 until 2023.

=== Graded events ===
The following Graded events were held at Belmont at the Big A in 2025.

Grade I

- Acorn Stakes
- Belmont Derby
- Belmont Oaks
- Belmont Stakes
- Champagne Stakes
- Frizette Stakes
- Jaipur Invitational Stakes
- Joe Hirsch Turf Classic
- Just a Game Stakes
- Manhattan Stakes
- Ogden Phipps Stakes
- Metropolitan Handicap
- New York Stakes
- Woody Stephens Stakes

Grade II

- Bed O' Roses Invitational Stakes
- Beldame Stakes
- Belmont Gold Cup Invitational Stakes
- Brooklyn Invitational Stakes
- Gallant Bloom Handicap
- Hill Prince Stakes
- Kelso Handicap
- Knickerbocker Stakes
- Man o' War Stakes
- Miss Grillo Stakes
- Mother Goose Stakes
- Ruffian Handicap
- Sheepshead Bay Stakes
- Suburban Stakes
- True North Stakes
- Wonder Again Stakes
- Woodward Stakes

Grade III

- Athenia Stakes
- Beaugay Stakes
- Bold Ruler Handicap
- Dwyer Stakes
- Fort Marcy Stakes
- Futurity Stakes
- Intercontinental Stakes
- Jockey Club Derby
- Jockey Club Oaks
- John A. Nerud Stakes
- Matron Stakes
- Noble Damsel Handicap
- Pennine Ridge Stakes
- Pebbles Stakes
- Peter Pan Stakes
- Pilgrim Stakes
- Poker Stakes
- Sands Point Stakes
- Soaring Softly Stakes
- Vagrancy Stakes
- Victory Ride Stakes
- Vosburgh Stakes
- Waya Stakes
- Westchester Stakes

In 2021, the Woodward Stakes and Waya Stakes were moved to Belmont, while the Jockey Club Gold Cup and the Flower Bowl Stakes were moved to Saratoga.

=== Meets ===
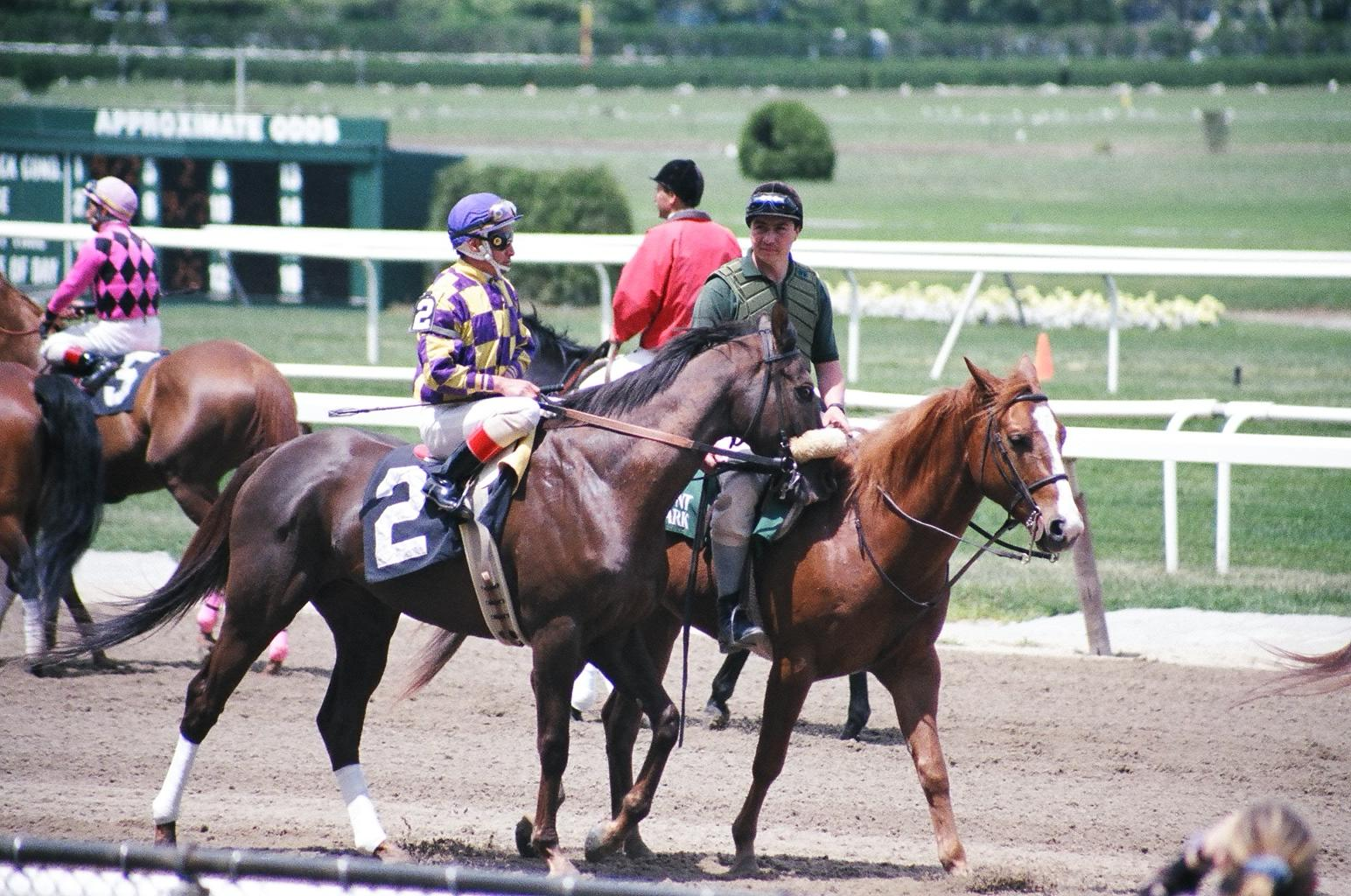
Horses and lead ponies in a pre-race post parade at Belmont.

Before the 2024 reconstruction, racing at Belmont Park was conducted in two annual installments, or "meetings". The "spring-summer meeting" usually began on the Thursday or Friday of the week before the Kentucky Derby in April and lasts through the first or second Sunday in July, depending on the start of the Saratoga meet that follows. The Saratoga meet was expanded to eight weeks in 2019. The "fall meeting" follows the Saratoga season, commencing on the Thursday or Friday after Labor Day and ending on either the last Sunday in October or in some years the first Sunday in November, usually dependent on the dates of the Breeders' Cup. Racing is held at Saratoga Race Course, during the time between these two meetings.

Prior to 1977, a summer meeting was contested at Aqueduct from mid-June until the Saratoga meet began; its abolition led to the Belmont spring meeting being lengthened to its present duration.

The autumn installment is known as the Fall Championship meet, since many of the eventual Eclipse Award title winners have earned key victories in some of the meeting's races, such as the Jockey Club Gold Cup.

Belmont has been home to the day-long Breeders' Cup championship in 1990, 1995, 2001 and most recently in 2005.

Belmont's backyard is well known as a gathering place for racing fans to see their horses saddled before they hit the track. The center of the paddock is dominated by a white pine that pre-dated the track itself—it turned 180 years old in 2006.

== Belmont track announcers ==
Because of Belmont's role in hosting big, nationally televised races on broadcast and cable TV, its track announcers have been among the best known in the sport. Belmont PA announcers are:

- Fred Capossela (1940–1971)
- Dave Johnson (1972–1977) - Contrary to popular belief, Johnson, not Anderson, was Belmont Park's PA announcer during Secretariat's 1973 romp in the Belmont Stakes. There is no known audio to exist of Johnson's call of that Belmont. It was on TV that Anderson called the 1973 Belmont Stakes aired by CBS Television, where he famously described Big Red as "moving like a tremendous machine".
- Chic Anderson (1977–1979)
- Marshall Cassidy (1979–1990)
- Tom Durkin (1990–2014)
- Larry Collmus (2014–2020)
- John Imbriale (2020–2023)

== See also ==
- American Triple Crown
- Graded stakes race
