= Tourist (horse) =

American-bred Thoroughbred racehorse

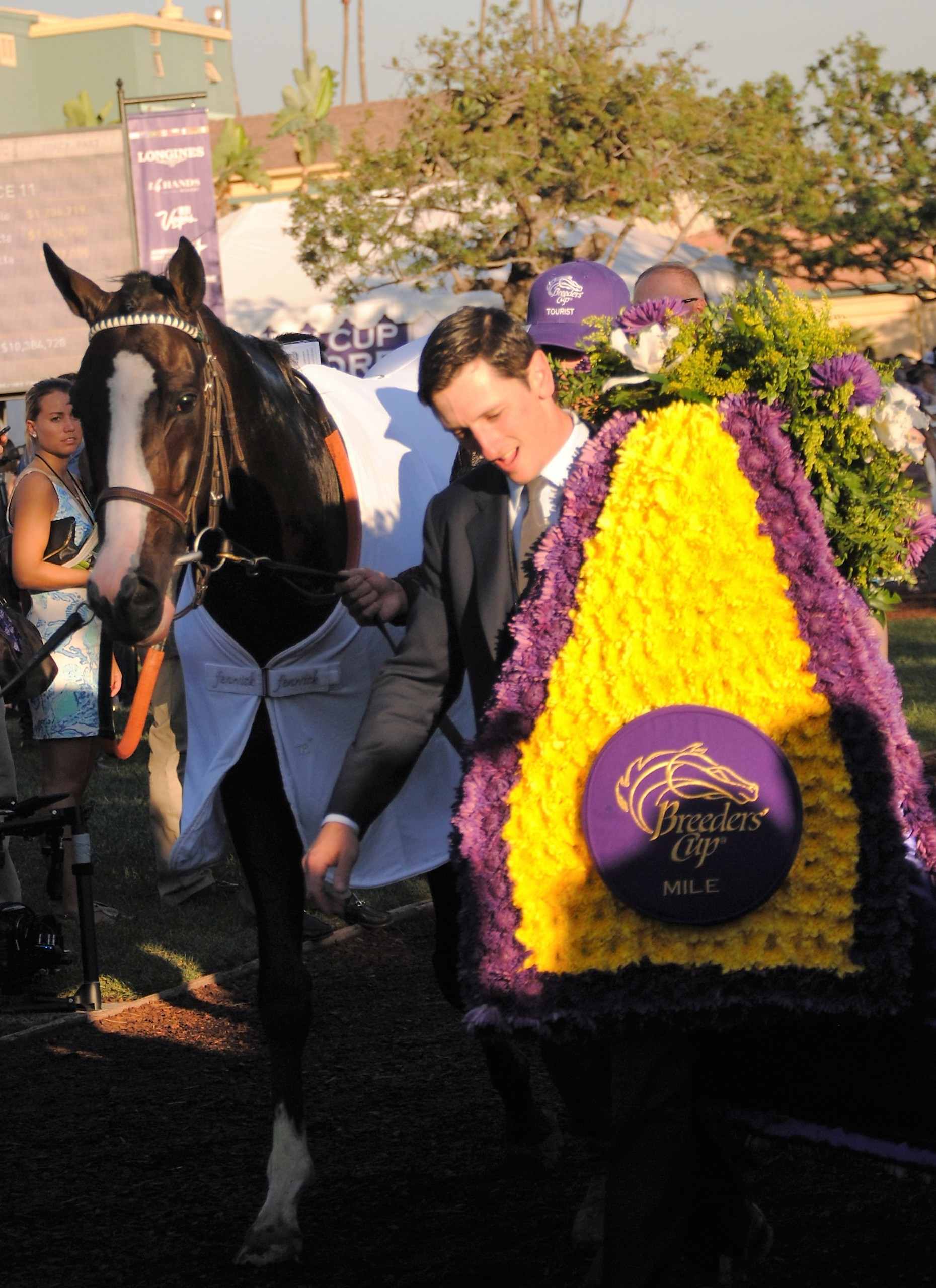
- Tourist after winning the 2016 Breeders' Cup Mile
- Sire: Tiznow
- Grandsire: Cee's Tizzy
- Dam: Unbridled Melody
- Damsire: Unbridled's Song
- Sex: Stallion
- Foaled: April 10, 2011
- Country: United States
- Colour: Bay
- Breeder: WinStar Farm
- Owner: WinStar Farm, Wachtel Stable, and Gary Barber and Christian Desa
- Trainer: William I. Mott
- Record: 18: 6–3–4
- Earnings: $2,170,340

Major wins
- Sir Cat Stakes (2014); More Than Ready Mile Stakes (2015); Fourstardave Handicap (2016) Breeders' Cup win: Breeders' Cup Mile (2016)

Tourist (foaled April 10, 2011 in Kentucky) is a retired American Thoroughbred racehorse best and active breeding stallion known for winning the 2016 Breeders' Cup Mile. He raced unsuccessfully on dirt before switching to turf, where he quickly established himself as a stakes caliber horse. In addition to the Breeders' Cup Mile, he won the More Than Ready Mile Stakes and the Fourstardave Handicap, and over $2 million in earnings.

== Background ==
Tourist is a dark bay horse with a broad white blaze on his forehead. Bred by WinStar Farm, he was sired by Tiznow, who is one of their most influential stallions. Tiznow was a late developing horse who won back-to-back Breeders' Cup Classics, and is known for siring offspring that also tend to develop later in their career and are best at a distance of a mile and up. Tiznow is the most important modern descendant of Man o' War in the direct male line – the sire line traces back to the Godolphin Arabian.

Tourist's dam, Unbridled Melody by Unbridled's Song, comes from a strong female family that has produced multiple stakes winners in recent generations. Unbridled Melody produced five named foals, four of them stakes winners.

Tourist has been described as "a terrific blend of Tiznow's size and strength, with Unbridled's Song's quality and balance." He raced for WinStar Farm in partnership with Gary Barber and Wachtel Stable. He was trained by Hall of Fame member William (Bill) Mott.

== Racing career ==
=== 2013: two-year-old season ===
Tourist raced three times as a two-year-old, with his best finish being a second-place finish in a maiden special weight at Aqueduct on December 1, 2013. All three starts were on the dirt.

=== 2014: three-year-old season ===
Tourist started his three-year-old campaign with another loss, this time a fourth-place finish at Aqueduct on January 10, 2014, again on the dirt. On February 8 at Gulfstream Park, he finally won for the first time in a maiden special weight race at 1 1/16 miles on the turf. He sat just off the early pace then inched his way to the lead, completing the race in a good time of 1:40.40. He followed this up with an allowance race win on June 8 at Belmont Park, winning in wire-to-wire fashion by over five lengths.

On July 18, Tourist entered his first stakes race, the Sir Cat at Saratoga. As the 1.7–1 favorite, Tourist again went to the early lead and won under a strong hand ride by 1 3/4 lengths, earning a Beyer Speed Figure of 102 in the process. "It didn't surprise me", said Mott about Tourist's improvement when switched to the turf. "The problem was, he ran just well enough on the dirt that we kind of kept trying him. We all want a Derby horse, right? We tried him one or two extra times on the dirt than, maybe, was to his benefit, but it's all coming together now."

Mott then moved Tourist up to Grade I company in the Secretariat Stakes at Arlington Park on August 16. Tourist again went to the lead but was caught in the stretch by Adelaide, a highly regarded son of Galileo trained by Aidan O'Brien. Tourist held on for second. "He ran well", said jockey Joel Rosario. "I had to move a little early and the horse that won the race was there with me and he got me. It was his (Tourist's) first time going a mile and a quarter and he did well."

On November 1, Tourist entered the Breeders' Cup Mile at Santa Anita off an 11-week layoff. He broke from post thirteen and was carried wide around the first turn. He tried to improve his position down the backstretch but was again fanned wide in the second turn. He then tired, eventually finishing thirteenth. He finished the year with a record of three wins and one second from six starts.

=== 2015: four-year-old season ===
Tourist came down with an illness and did not return to the track until September 5, 2015, in the $300,000 More Than Ready Mile Stakes at Kentucky Downs. He was the second favorite at odds of 2–1, behind favored Undrafted, winner of the Group 1 Diamond Jubilee Stakes at Royal Ascot. Tourist went to the early lead and fought off a challenge from Undrafted, then drew away to win by 3 1/4 lengths.

On October 3, Tourist entered the Shadwell Turf Mile Stakes at Keeneland racetrack in preparation for the Breeders' Cup. The 12-horse field for the $1,000,000 race was considered evenly matched, featuring Dutch Connection (Jersey Stakes), Grand Arch (Fourstardave), The Pizza Man (Arlington Million), Seek Again (Hollywood Derby) and Bobby's Kitten (Breeders' Cup Turf Sprint). Tourist settled in mid-pack and raced wide around both turns, then closed well in the stretch to finish third behind Grand Arch and The Pizza Man.

Mott next entered the colt in the Breeders' Cup Mile on November 1 at Keeneland, where he faced a stellar field including Tepin, who had won the First Lady Stakes by seven lengths, Esoterique, whose wins included the Prix Jacques Le Marois, Mondialiste (Woodbine Mile) and defending Mile winner Karakontie. Tourist raced in third near the early leaders, pulling hard against his jockey's attempt to rate his pace. Turning into the stretch, Tourist had no response and faded to eighth. He finished the year with one win and a third from three starts.

=== 2016: five-year-old season ===
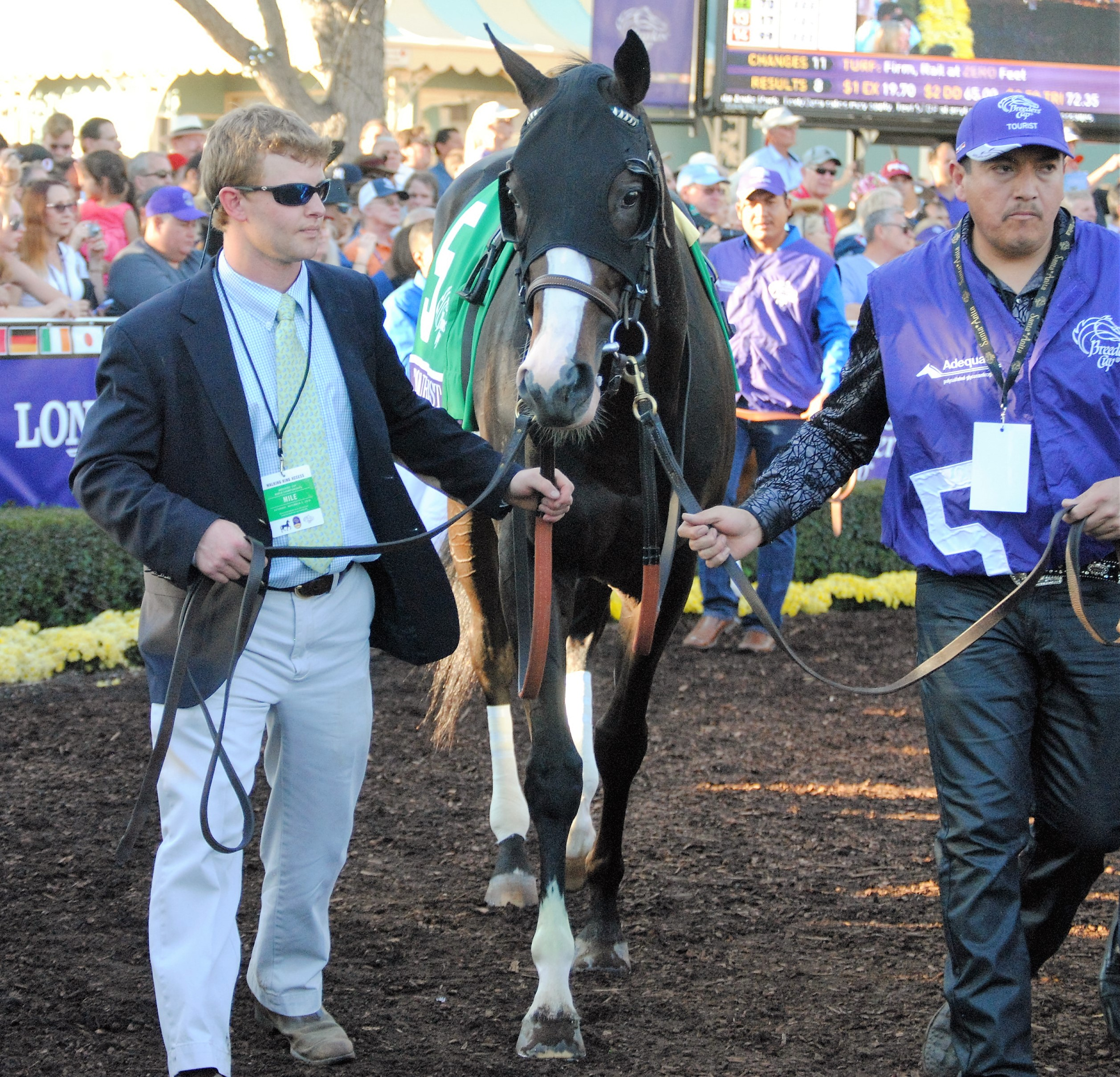
Tourist at the Breeders' Cup Mile in 2016

Tourist began his five-year-old campaign on April 15, 2016, with a third-place finish in the Makers 46 Mile Stakes at Keeneland behind Miss Temple City. Jockey Jose Lezcano said after the race, "I got in good position. The pace was very good. I had plenty of horse, so I followed the horse in front of me (Miss Temple City) and when I asked he gave me the kick I needed. The horse in front (Miss Temple City) can run. It was still a very good race."

Tourist next entered the Turf Classic Stakes at Churchill Downs on May 7, finishing fourth behind Divisidero. He then shipped to Santa Anita for the Shoemaker Mile, finishing a fast-closing second to Midnight Storm.

He then returned to Saratoga for the Grade I Fourstardave Handicap on August 20. Racing just behind a slow early pace, Tourist made his move around the far turn and then held off a late charge by A Lot to win by 1 1/2 lengths, with Grand Arch in third. The jockey of A Lot filed an objection regarding interference at the start, but the stewards let the results stand. "He's been a good horse for us, multiple grade I-placed", said Mott. "To win the Fourstardave in Saratoga was very important. There have been some nice horses win it in the past and I'm sure we'll have some more in the future. But it was his day today."

For the second year in a row, Tourist prepped for the Breeders' Cup in the Shadwell Turf Mile and again he finished third, this time to Miss Temple City and Ironicus. Lezcano said after the race, "He stumbled a little bit at the break but after that I had a very good trip. I saved ground on the backside and let him breathe a little bit. The pace was kind of slow. I asked him at the quarter pole and he came running. He's a very nice horse."

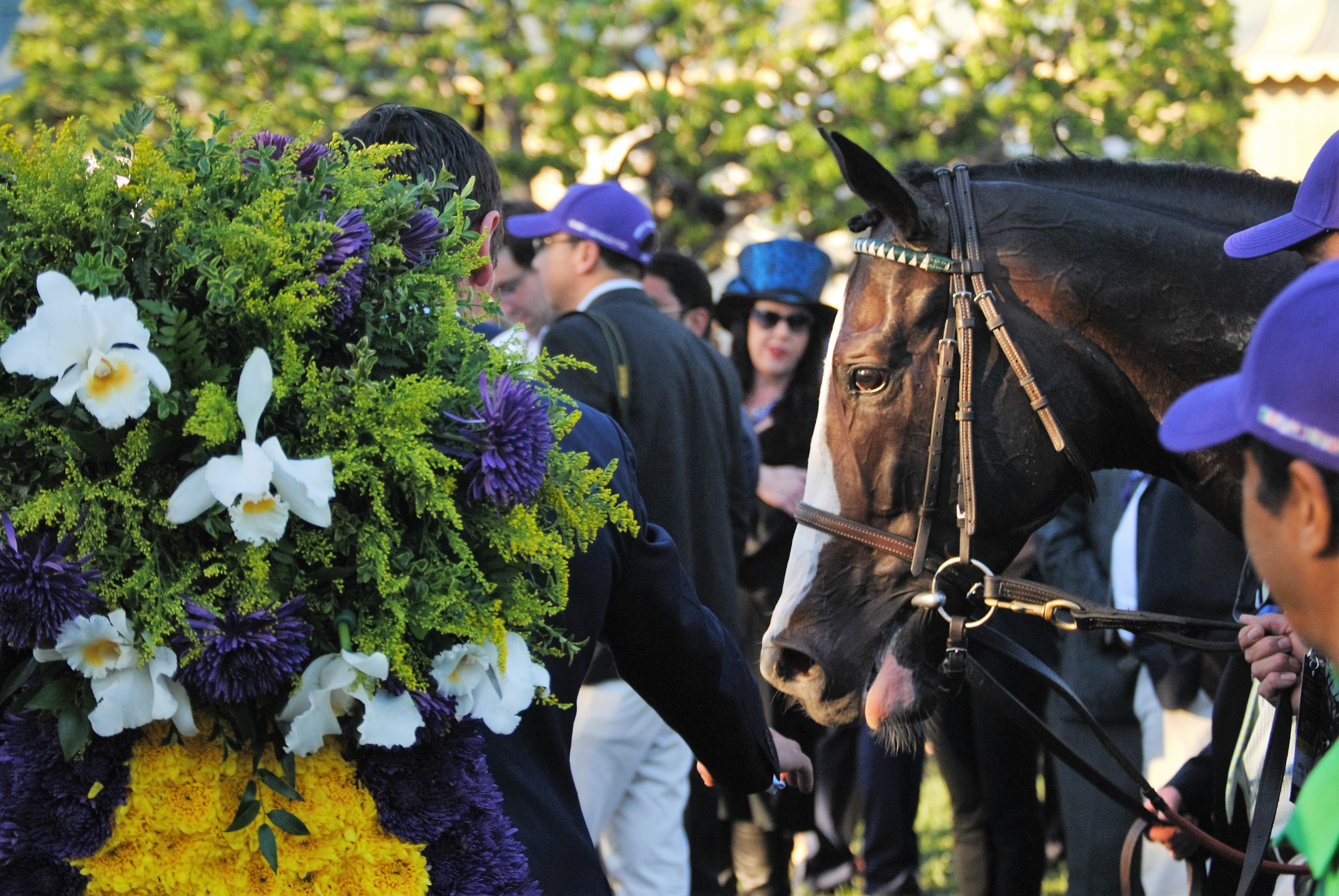
Tourist with the Breeders' Cup Mile bouquet

In his third try at the Breeders' Cup Mile, Tourist was a longshot in an excellent field that included defending champion Tepin, Limato (July Cup, Prix de la Forêt) and Alice Springs (Falmouth, Matron, Sun Chariot), plus old rivals Miss Temple City and Midnight Storm. Behind a rapid early pace, Tourist settled into fifth place along the rail, followed by Limato and Tepin to his outside. Tourist kicked for home first and sailed up the rail to the lead. Four wide around the final turn, Tepin made a late charge but missed by half a length. The time for the race was 1:31.71 – the fastest Breeders' Cup Mile ever run and just off the Santa Anita course record of 1:31.69. "We went from having the worst trip you can imagine (in 2014) to having the best trip", said Mott.

After the race, Elliott Walden of WinStar Farm was asked about future plans for Tourist. "We're going to talk about it as a group, but when you win a race like that against the best milers in the world, and he's five years old, he'll probably go to stud", he said. "Give a lot of credit to Adam Wachtel. He came to me a few years ago and wanted to purchase half of this horse for Gary (Barber) and himself. He's always believed in him and believed he's the best miler in the country."

Tourist finished the year with a record of two wins, a second and two thirds from six starts, all at the Grade I level. His career record was six wins from eighteen starts, with earnings of $2,170,340.

== Retirement ==
Tourist was retired to stud at WinStar Farm with an initial fee of $12,500 for the 2017 season. He was moved to stand at Rockridge Stud in Hudson, New York for the 2023 breeding season. In November 2024, he was sold to Fazli Yurdabak of Turkey for his 2025 stallion career at Izmit Stallion Complex after quarantine at Elmendorf Farm's Sancal Racing.

== Pedigree ==
Pedigree of Tourist, bay horse, 2011
| Sire Tiznow 1997 | Cee's Tizzy; 1987 | Relaunch | In Reality |
| Sire Tiznow 1997 | Cee's Tizzy; 1987 | Relaunch | Foggy Note |
| Sire Tiznow 1997 | Cee's Tizzy; 1987 | Tizly | Lyphard |
| Sire Tiznow 1997 | Cee's Tizzy; 1987 | Tizly | Tizna |
| Sire Tiznow 1997 | Cee's Song; 1986 | Seattle Song | Seattle Slew |
| Sire Tiznow 1997 | Cee's Song; 1986 | Seattle Song | Incantation |
| Sire Tiznow 1997 | Cee's Song; 1986 | Lonely Dancer | Nice Dancer |
| Sire Tiznow 1997 | Cee's Song; 1986 | Lonely Dancer | Sleep Lonely |
| Dam Unbridled Melody 2002 | Unbridled's Song; 1993 | Unbridled | Fappiano |
| Dam Unbridled Melody 2002 | Unbridled's Song; 1993 | Unbridled | Gana Facil |
| Dam Unbridled Melody 2002 | Unbridled's Song; 1993 | Trolley Song | Caro (IRE) |
| Dam Unbridled Melody 2002 | Unbridled's Song; 1993 | Trolley Song | Lucky Spell |
| Dam Unbridled Melody 2002 | Skye Castles; 1996 | Sky Classic | Nijinsky |
| Dam Unbridled Melody 2002 | Skye Castles; 1996 | Sky Classic | No Class |
| Dam Unbridled Melody 2002 | Skye Castles; 1996 | My Sea Castles | Polish Navy |
| Dam Unbridled Melody 2002 | Skye Castles; 1996 | My Sea Castles | Mysteries family: 6-b |
