= Campanelle (horse) =

Irish Thoroughbred racehorse

- Racing silks of Stonestreet Stables
- Sire: Kodiac
- Grandsire: Danehill
- Dam: Janina
- Damsire: Namid
- Sex: Filly
- Foaled: 16 April 2018
- Country: Ireland
- Colour: Bay
- Breeder: Tally-Ho Stud
- Owner: Stonestreet Stables
- Trainer: Wesley Ward
- Record: 11: 6-0-2
- Earnings: US$1,070,417

Major wins
- Queen Mary Stakes (2020); Prix Morny (2020); Commonwealth Cup (2021); Mint Ladies Sprint Stakes (2022)

Awards
- Top-rated European two-year-old filly (2020)
- Last updated on 31 December 2022

Campanelle (foaled 16 April 2018) is an Irish-bred, American-trained Thoroughbred racehorse. As a two-year-old in 2020 she won her first race in the United States and was then sent to Europe where she won the Queen Mary Stakes in England and the Prix Morny in France.

== Background ==
Campanelle is a bay filly with a white star bred in Ireland by the County Westmeath-based Tally-Ho Stud. In October 2019 she was consigned to the Tattersalls Yearling and was purchased for 190,000 guineas by the bloodstock agent Ben McElroy. She entered the ownership of Stonestreet Stables and was exported to the United States where she was sent into training with Wesley Ward.

She was sired by Kodiac, a sprinter who won four minor races from twenty starts and finished second in the Hackwood Stakes and fourth in the Prix Maurice de Gheest. He became a very successful breeding stallion, siring many major winners including Tiggy Wiggy, Fairyland and Hello Youmzain.

Campanelle's dam Janina showed good racing ability, winning two of her five races including the Listed Marygate Fillies' Stakes. She was a distant female-line descendant of the British broodmare Congo (foaled 1939), who was a half-sister to Nimbus and Grey Sovereign.

== Racing career ==
=== 2020: two-year-old season ===
Campanelle was equipped with blinkers when she made her track debut in a maiden race over five furlongs on the turf course at Gulfstream Park on 31 May. Ridden by Nik Juarez, and starting the 2.1/1 second choice in an eight-runner field, she took a narrow lead on the inside soon after the start and drew away in the closing stages to win by three and a half lengths.

In June Campanelle was sent to England to contest the Group 2 Queen Mary Stakes at the Royal Ascot meeting which took place behind closed doors owing to the COVID-19 pandemic. Ward had an exceptional record at the meeting, having trained ten winners beginning with Strike The Tiger's victory in the 2009 Windsor Castle Stakes. She started the 9/2 second favourite behind the Aidan O'Brien-trained More Beautiful and was partnered by Frankie Dettori. The 20/1 outsider Sardinia Sunset set the pace before giving way to Sacred but Campanelle gained the advantage inside the final furlong and "kept on well" to win by three quarters of a length. Travel restrictions meant that Ward had remained in Florida, leaving the conditioning of his Ascot runners to Dettori and Kieren Fallon. He commented "I had such high expectations for this filly. For her to come through in the biggest 2-year-old fillies' race at Ascot proves how good she really is" while Dettori said "She went as straight as a gun barrel and won very well. I was in the stalls for a very long time and she jumped a bit slow after losing concentration. She had plenty left two furlongs out and quickened very well. She's got a very sensible racing head".

On 23 August at Deauville Racecourse in France Campanelle (racing without blinkers) was stepped up to Group 1 class and matched against male opponents in the Prix Morny over 1200 metres on soft ground. With Dettori again in the saddle she started the 1.7/1 favourite against eight opponents including Tactical (winner of the July Stakes), Cairn Gorm (Prix de Cabourg), Livachope (Prix du Bois) and Nando Parrado (Coventry Stakes). Racing down the centre of the track, Campanelle led soon after the start and pulled clear in the closing stages to win by two lengths and a neck from Nando Parrado and Rhythm Master. Commenting on the fact that he would have to go into quarantine on his return to England, Dettori said "I've filled my car with wine, baguettes and cheese and I'm going to travel through the night, get my test tomorrow and lock myself in the house for a week" and added of the winner "She's got an amazing, long stride. She coped with this ground but she's much better on good. I was worried about it but class comes through... she's able to listen to my commands. When I told her to slow down, she did, and when I asked her to quicken, she quickened. She's a very, very smart two-year-old".

For her final run of the year, Campanelle returned to the United States to contest the Grade I Breeders' Cup Juvenile Fillies Turf over one mile at Keeneland on 6 November. Ridden by Dettori she tracked the front-running favourite Mother Pearl but was unable to make any progress in the straight and came home fourth of the fourteen runners.

In the official European classification of for 2020 Campanelle was given a rating of 113, making her the equal best two-year-old filly of the season alongside Pretty Gorgeous and Shale.

=== 2021: three-year-old season ===
For her first race as a three-year-old, Campanelle returned to Ascot in June for the Commonwealth Cup over six furlongs on heavy ground and started the 5/1 third choice in the betting behind the French filly Suesa (Prix Texanita) and the colt Dragon Symbol (ridden by Oisin Murphy). The other twelve runners included Laws of Indices, Lippizaner (Doncaster Stakes), A Case of You, Isabella Giles (Rockfel Stakes) and The Lir Jet (Norfolk Stakes). After leading for most of the way before being overtaken by Dragon Symbol approaching the final furlong and despite rallying strongly she was beaten a head into second place. She had been repeatedly bumped by the colt in the closing stages and after an inquiry by the racecourse stewards she was promoted to first place. Dettori commented "It's never nice winning in the stewards' room but Oisin's horse drifted about eight lanes and brushed me three times and I got beaten a head. The stewards took the view that I was the unlucky loser and I'm pleased that they changed it. But I also feel very sorry for Oisin. He's a good friend of mine, but that's racing."

On 8 August Campanelle was matched against older horses in the Prix Maurice de Gheest over 1300 metres at Deauville Racecourse and started the 1.8/1 joint favourite. She became upset before the race and Dettori had to dismount and lead her to the start. She never looked likely to recover from a poor start when she reared up in the starting stalls and struck Dettori in the face, and finished last of the twelve runners. Dettori commented, "she was very upset today... She's used to a pony and a guy in the gate and she had none of that. It's just one of those things."

Campanelle returned to the United States in autumn. On 15 October she started favourite for the Grade III Franklin County Stakes at Keeneland but finished third behind the five-year-olds Change of Control and Ambassador Luna.

== Statistics ==
Date	Distance	Race	Grade	Track	Odds	Field	Finish	Winning Time	Winning (Losing) Margin	Jockey	Ref
2020 – two-year-old season
May 31, 2020	5 furlongs	Maiden Special Weight		Gulfstream Park	2.10	8	1	0:55.66	3 1/2 lengths	Nik Juarez	
Jun 20, 2020	5 furlongs	Queen Mary Stakes	II	Royal Ascot	9/2	18	1	1:00.18	3/4 length	Lanfranco Dettori	
Aug 23, 2020	1200 metres	Prix Morny (Note: The Prix Morny is an event without sex restriction for two-year-olds. Campanelle faced male horses)	I	Deauville	1.70	9	1	1:34.07	2 lengths	Lanfranco Dettori	
Nov 6, 2020	1 mile	Breeders' Cup Juvenile Fillies Turf	I	Del Mar	4.70	12	4	1:35.71	(4 3/4 lengths)	Lanfranco Dettori	
2021 – three-year-old season
Jun 18, 2021	6 furlongs	Commonwealth Cup (Note: The Commonwealth Cup is an event without sex restriction for three-year-olds. Campanelle faced male horses)	I	Royal Ascot	5/1	15	1 (Note: Dragon Symbol finished first in the Commonwealth Cup, but he was relegated to second place following a stewards' inquiry and Campanelle was declared the winner)	1:00.18	(head)	Lanfranco Dettori	
Aug 8, 2021	1300 metres	Prix Maurice de Gheest (Note: The Prix Maurice de Gheest is an event without sex restriction for three-year-olds. Campanelle faced male horses)	I	Deauville	1.80*	12	12	1:17.04	(12 3/4 lengths)	Lanfranco Dettori	
Oct 15, 2021	5 1/2 furlongs	Franklin County Stakes	III	Keeneland	1.20*	10	3	1:05.89	(1 1/2 lengths)	Joel Rosario	
2022 – four-year-old season
Apr 16, 2022	5 1/2 furlongs	Giant's Causeway Stakes	Listed	Keeneland	1.90*	13	1	1:01.98	2 1/2 lengths	Irad Ortiz Jr.	
Jun 18, 2022	6 furlongs	Platinum Jubilee Stakes (Note: The Platinum Jubilee Stakes is an event without sex restriction for four-year-olds and older. Campanelle faced male horses)	I	Royal Ascot	10/1	24	3 (Note: Campanelle finished third in a dead heat with Artorius (AUS))	1:12.17	(3/4 length)	Irad Ortiz Jr.	
Sep 10, 2022	6 1/2 furlongs	Mint Ladies Sprint	III	Kentucky Downs	2.30*	12	1	1:14.57	nose	Irad Ortiz Jr.	
Nov 6, 2022	5 1/2 furlongs	Breeders' Cup Turf Sprint	I	Keeneland	8.30	14	7	1:01.79	(5 1/4 lengths)	Lanfranco Dettori	

Legend:
Turf Dirt
Notes:
An (*) asterisk after the odds means Campanelle was the post-time favorite.

== Pedigree ==
Pedigree of Campanelle (IRE), bay filly, 2018
Sire Kodiac (GB) 2001	Danehill (USA); 1986	Danzig	Northern Dancer (CAN)
Sire Kodiac (GB) 2001	Danehill (USA); 1986	Danzig	Pas de Nom
Sire Kodiac (GB) 2001	Danehill (USA); 1986	Razyana	His Majesty
Sire Kodiac (GB) 2001	Danehill (USA); 1986	Razyana	Spring Adieu (CAN)
Sire Kodiac (GB) 2001	Rafha (GB); 1987	Kris	Sharpen Up
Sire Kodiac (GB) 2001	Rafha (GB); 1987	Kris	Doubly Sure
Sire Kodiac (GB) 2001	Rafha (GB); 1987	Eljazzi (IRE)	Artaius (USA)
Sire Kodiac (GB) 2001	Rafha (GB); 1987	Eljazzi (IRE)	Border Bounty (GB)
Dam Janina (GB) 2005	Namid (GB); 1996	Indian Ridge (IRE)	Ahonoora (GB)
Dam Janina (GB) 2005	Namid (GB); 1996	Indian Ridge (IRE)	Hillbrow (GB)
Dam Janina (GB) 2005	Namid (GB); 1996	Dawnsio (IRE)	Tate Gallery (USA)
Dam Janina (GB) 2005	Namid (GB); 1996	Dawnsio (IRE)	Welsh Dancer (GB)
Dam Janina (GB) 2005	Lady Dominatrix (IRE); 1999	Danehill Dancer	Danehill (USA)
Dam Janina (GB) 2005	Lady Dominatrix (IRE); 1999	Danehill Dancer	Mira Adonde (USA)
Dam Janina (GB) 2005	Lady Dominatrix (IRE); 1999	Spout House	Flash of Steel
Dam Janina (GB) 2005	Lady Dominatrix (IRE); 1999	Spout House	Otterhill (GB) (Family: 6-f)

- Campanelle was inbred 2 × 4 to Danehill, meaning that this stallions appears in both the second and the fourth generations of her pedigree.
