= Dueling Grounds Oaks =

- Class: Grade III
- Location: Kentucky Downs; Franklin, Kentucky, United States
- Inaugurated: 2015
- Race type: Thoroughbred – Flat racing
- Sponsor: Blackwood (2026)
- Website: Kentucky Downs

Race information
- Distance: 1 5/16 miles
- Surface: Turf
- Track: Left-handed
- Qualification: Three-year-olds fillies
- Weight: 122 lbs with allowances
- Purse: $2,000,000 (since 2026)

The Dueling Grounds Oaks is a Grade III American Thoroughbred horse race for three years old fillies, over a distance of one and five-sixteenths miles on the turf held annually in late August or early September at Kentucky Downs racetrack in Franklin, Kentucky during their short turf meeting. The event currently carries a purse of $2,000,000 which includes $1,000,000 from the Kentucky Thoroughbred Development Fund.

== History ==
With the introduction of Instant Racing in 2011, the influx of revenue enabled the administration of the track to add new events. The track formerly known as Dueling Grounds Race Course is located very close to the Kentucky-Tennessee border, where numerous duels were held in the 1800s.

The inaugural running of the race was on September 19, 2015, the final day of the six-day meeting at Kentucky Downs. A full field of twelve entrants lined up and the event was won by the Mark E. Casse-trained Return to Grace who started at 5/1 winning by a 1 1/2 lengths in a time of 2:12.75. The event was initiated the following year after the Dueling Grounds Derby was first run (in 2014) with the administration of the track adding a sister event for three-year-old fillies.

From 2016 through 2023 the event was run on the same day as the Dueling Grounds Derby.

With the influx of gaming revenue at Kentucky Downs the purse for the event has risen dramatically to nearly $500,000 offered by 2020.

From 2018 until 2019 the event was sponsored by Fifth Third Insurance. Lexington, Kentucky based Exacta Systems, sponsored the event in 2020 through 2022.

In 2021 the event was upgraded by the Thoroughbred Owners and Breeders Association to Listed Status.

Winners of the event in 2017 (Daddys Lil Darling), 2019 (Princesa Carolina), 2020 (Micheline) and 2023 (Freydis the Red) each set new track records for the 1 5/16-mile distance of the event.

Since 2024 the event has been an invitational which is reflected in the name.

In 2025 the event was upgraded to Grade III by the Thoroughbred Owners and Breeders Association.

== Records ==
Speed record:

- 1 5/16 miles: 2:05.52 – Fionn (2025)

Margins:

- 7 1/2 lengths – Try You Luck (2016)

Most wins by an owner:

- 2 – Godolphin Racing (2020, 2021)
- 2 – Three Chimneys Farm (2019, 2023)

Most wins by a jockey:

- 3 – Joel Rosario (2020, 2021, 2022)

Most wins by a trainer:

- 3 – Kenneth G. McPeek (2017, 2019, 2023)
- 3 – Brad H. Cox (2021, 2025, 2026)

== Winners ==
| Year | Winner | Jockey | Trainer | Owner | Distance | Time | Purse | Grade | Ref |
|---|---|---|---|---|---|---|---|---|---|
| 2026 | Kentucky Belle | Flavien Prat | Brad H. Cox | WinStar Farm | 1 5/16 miles | 2:07.45 | $1,995,000 | III | |
| 2025 | Fionn | Flavien Prat | Brad H. Cox | George Messina & Michael Lee | 1 5/16 miles | 2:05.52 | $1,970,000 | III | |
| 2024 | Kathynmarissa | Frankie Dettori | Richard Dutrow Jr. | Michael J. Caruso & Michael Dubb | 1 5/16 miles | 2:06.40 | $1,533,100 | Listed | |
| 2023 | Freydis the Red (FR) | Brian Hernandez Jr. | Kenneth G. McPeek | Walking L Thoroughbreds & Three Chimneys Farm | 1 5/16 miles | 2:06.13 | $757,714 | Listed | |
| 2022 | Vergara | Joel Rosario | H. Graham Motion | Gary Broad | 1 5/16 miles | 2:14.95 | $445,950 | Listed | |
| 2021 | Adventuring | Joel Rosario | Brad H. Cox | Godolphin Racing | 1 5/16 miles | 2:12.33 | $480,400 | Listed | |
| 2020 | Micheline | Joel Rosario | Michael Stidham | Godolphin Racing | 1 5/16 miles | 2:06.41 | $453,000 | | |
| 2019 | Princesa Carolina | Jose L. Ortiz | Kenneth G. McPeek | Three Chimneys Farm | 1 5/16 miles | 2:08.85 | $348,250 | | |
| 2018 | Osare | Jose L. Ortiz | Jonathan Thomas | Bridlewood Farm | 1 5/16 miles | 2:15.06 | $300,000 | | |
| 2017 | Daddys Lil Darling | Julien Leparoux | Kenneth G. McPeek | Normandy Farm | 1 5/16 miles | 2:10.97 | $200,000 | | |
| 2016 | Try Your Luck | Florent Geroux | Michael J. Maker | Out Of This World Racing | 1 5/16 miles | 2:11.60 | $188,720 | | |
| 2015 | Return to Grace | Joseph Rocco Jr. | Mark E. Casse | Calumet Farm | 1 5/16 miles | 2:12.75 | $199,429 | | |

Legend:
Turf

== See also ==
- List of American and Canadian Graded races
