= Mint Millions Stakes =

Thoroughbred horse race

Mint Millions Invitational Stakes
- Class: Grade III
- Location: Kentucky Downs; Franklin, Kentucky, United States
- Inaugurated: 1992 (as Sanford Duncan Stakes)
- Race type: Thoroughbred - Flat racing
- Website: Kentucky Downs

Race information
- Distance: One mile
- Surface: Turf
- Track: Left-handed
- Qualification: Three years olds and older
- Weight: Base weights with allowances: Older: 126 lbs. 3YOs: 122 lbs.
- Purse: $2,000,000 (since 2026)

The Mint Millions Stakes is a Grade III American Thoroughbred horse race for three years olds and older, over a distance of one mile on the turf held annually in September at Kentucky Downs racetrack in Franklin, Kentucky during their short turf meeting. The event currently carries an offered purse of $2,000,000 which includes $1,000,000 from the Kentucky Thoroughbred Development Fund.

== History ==
The inaugural running of the event was on 11 October 1992 as the Sanford Duncan Stakes at a distance of about one mile. The event was named after an early settler in the area, Sanford Duncan who had built an Inn in 1818 which was on the Lexington to Nashville road adjacent to where the Dueling Grounds race track is located today.

The event was not held in 1996 and 1997 due to the race track being closed while it was being auctioned.

In 1998 new ownership of the race track revived the event as part of the Kentucky Cup, which interlaced races from Turfway Park and the newly renamed Kentucky Downs. The event was scheduled as a handicap and was known as the Kentucky Cup Mile Handicap. In 2002 the conditions of the event were changed from handicap to stakes allowance and the name of the event was modified.

In 2005 and 2006 the event was not scheduled as part of the Kentucky Cup program. In 2007 the event was revived as the Franklin Stakes and in 2008 the event was held as the Franklin-Simpson Stakes in honor of the city and county where the Kentucky Downs racetrack is located. For the 2012 and 2013 runnings the event was known as the Franklin-Simpson Mile Stakes.

In 2014 the event was renamed once again to the More Than Ready Mile Stakes in honor of G1 King's Bishop Stakes winner More than Ready who stood at WinStar Farm from 2013. More Than Ready became the number 1 sire of Breeders' Cup wins with seven. The 2014 winner Regally Ready was sired also by More Than Ready.

With the influx of gaming revenue at Kentucky Downs the purse for the event has risen dramatically to $300,000 offered by 2014.

In 2017 the event was renamed to the Tourist Mile Stakes after the 2015 winner of the event, Tourist who went onto win the Breeders' Cup Mile at Santa Anita Park. Tourist was part-owned by WinStar Farm and is currently active at the stud.

In 2021 the event was upgraded by the Thoroughbred Owners and Breeders Association to a Grade III. For the 2021 running Kentucky Downs raised the purse to $1 million and renamed the event to the Mint Million sponsored by WinStar Farm. In 2023 the purse was raised to $2,000,000 and the name of the event was modified to Mint Millions. ("The Mint" is the name of the gaming hall on the grounds of Kentucky Downs which features historical horse racing wagering.)

Since 2025 the event has been held as an Invitational.

== Records ==
Speed record:

- 1 mile – 1:32.21 Flavius (2020)

Margins:

- 6 1/2 lengths – Depeche Chat (2012)

Most wins by a jockey:

- 2 – Jose Valdivia Jr. (2007, 2017)
- 2 – Julio García (2011, 2018)
- 2 – Julien Leparoux (2016, 2019)
- 2 – Jamie Spencer (2023, 2026)

Most wins by a trainer:

- 2 – Walter M. Bindner Jr. (1993, 1995)
- 2 – William I. Mott (2000, 2015)
- 2 – Wesley A. Ward (2011, 2018)
- 2 – Steven M. Asmussen (2014, 2019)
- 2 – Michael J. Maker (2016, 2022)

Most wins by an owner:

- 3 – Kenneth L. and Sarah K. Ramsey (2011, 2013, 2016)

== Winners ==
Year	Winner	Age	Jockey	Trainer	Owner	Distance	Time	Purse	Grade	Ref
Mint Millions Invitational Stakes
2026	Haatem (IRE)	5	Jamie Spencer	Richard Hannon Jr.	Wathnan Racing	1 mile	1:34.32	$1,362,000	III	
2025	Epic Ride	4	Edgar Morales	John Ennis	Welch Racing	1 mile	1:32.42	$2,492,500	III	
Mint Millions Stakes
2024	Goliad	7	Flavien Prat	Richard E. Mandella	Ramona S. & Perry R. Bass II	1 mile	1:33.38	$1,800,000	III	
2023	Ancient Rome	4	Jamie Spencer	Charlie Hills	Mrs. Fitriani Hay	1 mile	1:33.37	$1,994,285	III	
Mint Million
2022	Somelikeithotbrown	6	José Ortiz	Michael J. Maker	SkyChai Racing & David Koenig	1 mile	1:33.88	$707,545	III	
2021	Pixelate	4	Joel Rosario	Michael Stidham	Godolphin Stables	1 mile	1:34.04	$845,875	III	
Tourist Mile Stakes
2020	Flavius	5	Javier Castellano	Chad C. Brown	Juddmonte Farm	1 mile	1:32.21	$712,900	Listed	
2019	Snapper Sinclair	4	Julien Leparoux	Steven M. Asmussen	Bloom Racing Stable	1 mile	1:37.95	$750,000	Listed	
2018	Bound for Nowhere	4	Julio Garcia	Wesley A. Ward	Wesley A. Ward	1 mile	1:40.97	$681,400	Listed	
2017	Applicator	4	Jose Valdivia Jr.	Mikhail Yanakov	Olympia Star	1 mile	1:44.79	$270,020	Listed	
More Than Ready Mile Stakes
2016	Watchyourownbobber	4	Julien Leparoux	Michael J. Maker	Kenneth L. and Sarah K. Ramsey	1 mile	1:38.94	$390,000	Listed	
2015	Tourist	6	Florent Geroux	William I. Mott	WinStar Farm, Wachtel Stable & Gary Barber	1 mile	1:36.17	$300,000		
2014	Regally Ready	7	Rosie Napravnik	Steven M. Asmussen	Vinery Stables	1 mile	1:35.25	$200,000		
Franklin-Simpson Mile Stakes
2013	Coalport	4	Channing Hill	Wayne M. Catalano	Kenneth L. and Sarah K. Ramsey	1 mile	1:35.86	$123,917		
2012	Depeche Chat	4	Brian Hernandez Jr.	George R. Arnold III	Wind River Stables	1 mile	1:51.20	$60,000		
2011	Cozy Kitten	4	Julio Garcia	Wesley A. Ward	Kenneth L. and Sarah K. Ramsey	1 mile	1:40.70	$50,000		
2009–2010		Race not held								
Franklin-Simpson Stakes
2008	Demarcation	4	Jamie Theriot	Paul McGee	Amerman Racing	1 mile	1:35.27	$50,000		
Franklin Stakes
2007	Art Moderne	7	Jose Valdivia Jr.	Martin Wolfson	Edmund A. Gann	1 mile	1:36.84	$50,000		
2005–2006		Race not held								
Kentucky Cup Mile Stakes
2004	Missme	5	Rafael Bejarano	Lynn Whiting	Whippoorwill Farm	1 mile	1:37.13	$100,000	Listed	
2003	Hard Buck (BRZ)	4	Brice Blanc	Kenneth G. McPeek	Team Victory II	1 mile	1:37.81	$100,000	Listed	
2002	Jake the Flake	6	Calvin Borel	Hal Wiggins	Jack Murphy & Pam Slaughter	1 mile	1:40.86	$200,000	Listed	
Kentucky Cup Mile Handicap
2001	Minor Wisdom	5	Robby Albarado	Richard Scherer	Carolyn K. Friedberg	1 mile	1:37.68	$200,000	Listed	
2000	Glick	4	Mark Guidry	William I. Mott	Allen E. Paulson Living Trust	1 mile	1:36.14	$200,000	Listed	
1999	Treat Me Doc	5	Jon Court	Eugene Brajczewski Jr.	Howard E. Nelson & Dan Johns	1 mile	1:37.20	$200,000	Listed	
1998	Rob 'n Gin	4	Joe Bravo	Robert Barbara	Sabine Stable	1 mile	1:35.00	$200,000	Listed	
1996–1997		Race not held								
Sanford Duncan Stakes
1995	Rare Reason	4	Tracy Hebert	Walter M. Bindner Jr.	Mason C. Rudd	abt. 1 mile	1:36.40	$100,000	Listed	
1994	§ Little Bro Lantis	6	Shane J. Sellers	Merrill Scherer	Robert Hall & William McCollough	abt. 1 mile	1:35.20	$100,000	Listed	
1993	Magesterial Cheer	5	Parker Buckley	Walter M. Bindner Jr.	Mason C. Rudd & Nelson Miller	abt. 1 mile	1:38.60	$100,000	Listed	
1992	Newton's Ace	5	Fabio Arguello Jr.	Jennie Riggs	Estate Of Charles A. Newton	abt. 1 mile	1:35.00	$100,000	Listed	

== See also ==
List of American and Canadian Graded races
