= Music City Stakes =

- Class: Grade II
- Location: Kentucky Downs; Franklin, Kentucky, United States
- Inaugurated: 2020
- Race type: Thoroughbred – Flat racing
- Sponsor: Ainsworth (since 2026)
- Website: kentuckydowns.com

Race information
- Distance: 6 1/2 furlongs
- Surface: Turf
- Track: Left-handed
- Qualification: Three-year-old fillies
- Weight: 124 lbs with allowances
- Purse: $1,500,000 (2026)

The Music City Stakes is a Grade II American Thoroughbred horse race for three-year-old fillies, over a distance of 6 1/2 furlongs on the turf held annually in September at Kentucky Downs racetrack in Franklin, Kentucky during their short turf meeting. The event currently carries a purse of $1,500,000 which includes $750,000 from the Kentucky Thoroughbred Development Fund.

== History ==
The race was inaugurated in 2020 with an attractive purse offered of $400,000. The event was won by the lightly raced West-Coast filly Lighthouse who started at the odds of 11/1 and won by 1 1/2 lengths in a time of 1:14.99. After returning to California, Lighthouse had two more starts before beings sent to Australia where she was placed twice at Group 1 level before capturing the Group 1 Coolmore Classic.

In 2023 the event was upgraded to a Grade III.

With the influx of gaming revenue at Kentucky Downs the initial purse for the event has risen dramatically to nearly $500,000 offered by 2022.

In 2024 the event was once again upgraded to a Grade II

== Records ==
Speed record:

- 6 1/2 furlongs: 1:14.54 – Shisospicy (2025)

Margins:

- 3 lengths – Shisospicy (2025)

Most wins by a jockey:

- 2 - Luis Saez (2024, 2026)

Most wins by a trainer:

- No trainer has won this race more than once.

Most wins by an owner:

- No owner has won this race more than once.

== Winners ==
Year	Winner	Jockey	Trainer	Owner	Distance	Time	Purse	Grade	Ref
2026	Somerset West	Luis Saez	John W. Sadler	Keith Abrahams	6 1/2 furlongs	1:15.80	$1,235,400	II	
2025	Shisospicy	Irad Ortiz Jr.	Jose D'Angelo	Morplay Racing & Qatar Racing	6 1/2 furlongs	1:14.54	$1,867,100	II	
2024	Simply in Front	Luis Saez	Eddie Kenneally	Colebrook Farms	6 1/2 furlongs	1:16.01	$1,767,200	II	
2023	Secret Money	Tyler Gaffalione	Brendan Walsh	Fortune Farm (Richard Nicolai), Robert G. Hahn & Matthew Hand	6 1/2 furlongs	1:15.14	$996,570	III	
2022	Freedom Speaks	Jose Lezcano	Jeremiah Englehart	Reitman Stables	6 1/2 furlongs	1:15.35	$471,750	Listed	
2021	Tobys Heart	Joel Rosario	Brian A. Lynch	Gary Barber, Terry Hamilton & Brian A. Lynch	6 1/2 furlongs	1:14.75	$487,950		
2020	Lighthouse	Umberto Rispoli	Simon Callaghan	LNJ Foxwoods	6 1/2 furlongs	1:14.99	$360,385		

== See also ==
- List of American and Canadian Graded races
