= Kentucky Downs Ladies Marathon Stakes =

- Class: Grade III
- Location: Kentucky Downs; Franklin, Kentucky, United States
- Inaugurated: 2012
- Race type: Thoroughbred – Flat racing
- Sponsor: Global Tote (since 2026)
- Website: Kentucky Downs

Race information
- Distance: 1 5/16 miles
- Surface: Turf
- Track: Left-handed
- Qualification: Three-year-olds and older
- Weight: Base weights with allowances: 4-year-olds and up: 126 lbs. 3-year-olds: 122 lbs.
- Purse: US$1,500,000 (since 2026)

The Kentucky Downs Ladies Marathon Stakes is a Grade III American Thoroughbred horse race for fillies and mares that are three years old or older, over a distance of one and five-sixteenths miles on the turf held annually in September at Kentucky Downs racetrack in Franklin, Kentucky during their short turf meeting. The event currently carries a purse of $1,500,000 which includes $750,000 from the Kentucky Thoroughbred Development Fund.

== History ==
With the introduction of Instant Racing in late 2011 the influx of revenue enabled the administration of the track added new events to an expanded racing season. One of these new events one was the Kentucky Downs Ladies Marathon Stakes.

The inaugural running of the event was on 15 September 2012 as the third event on the fourth day of the five day meeting at Kentucky Downs. A field of seven entrants lined up and the event was won by the Dreamfields Farm filly Maid of Heaven who started at 8/1 and was ridden by jockey Leandro Goncalves winning by a head in a time of 2:14.06.

Due to sponsorship the event has had several name changes. In 2015 the Thoroughbred auction house Fasig-Tipton located in Lexington, Kentucky sponsored the event. From 2017 until 2019 Kenneth L. and Sarah K. Ramsey's Ramsey Farms sponsored the event and it was run as the Ramsey Farms Stakes. In 2020 the event was sponsored by the Television Games Network and was held as the TVG Stakes.

The 2016 winner, Al's Gal proved the improving quality of the event by capturing the Grade 1 E. P. Taylor Stakes at Woodbine Racetrack in Canada in her next start.

With the influx of gaming revenue at Kentucky Downs the purse for the event has risen dramatically to nearly $500,000 offered by 2020.

In 2022 the event was upgraded by the Thoroughbred Owners and Breeders Association to a Grade III.

== Records ==
Speed record:

- 1 5/16 miles: 2:06.84 – Stellify (2025)

Margins:

- 5 1/2 lengths – Stellify (2026)

Most wins by an owner:

- 2 – Kenneth L. and Sarah K. Ramsey (2016, 2017)
- 2 – Elements Racing, George Messina & Michael Lee (2025, 2026)

Most wins by a jockey:

- 3 – Joel Rosario (2022, 2023, 2024)

Most wins by a trainer:

- 3 – Brad H. Cox (2022, 2025, 2026)

== Winners ==
Year	Winner	Age	Jockey	Trainer	Owner	Distance	Time	Purse	Grade	Ref
Kentucky Downs Ladies Marathon Stakes
2026	Stellify	5	Flavien Prat	Brad H. Cox	Elements Racing, George Messina & Michael Lee	1 5/16 miles	2:09.54	$1,395,000	III	
2025	Stellify	4	Florent Geroux	Brad H. Cox	Elements Racing, George Messina & Michael Lee	1 5/16 miles	2:06.84	$1,806,700	III	
2024	Neecie Marie	4	Joel Rosario	Robert Reid Jr.	Michael Milam	1 5/16 miles	2:07.16	$1,300,000	III	
2023	Vergara	4	Joel Rosario	H. Graham Motion	Gary Broad	1 5/16 miles	2:10.96	$900,000	III	
2022	Adventuring	4	Joel Rosario	Brad H. Cox	Godolphin	1 5/16 miles	2:08.28	$550,000	III	
2021	Family Way	4	Tyler Gaffalione	Brendan P. Walsh	Hunter Valley Farm, Debra L. O'Connor & Marc Detampel	1 5/16 miles	2:08.16	$501,000	Listed	
TVG Stakes
2020	Theodora B	5	Irad Ortiz Jr.	Michael W. Dickinson	Augustin Stable	1 5/16 miles	2:09.72	$492,575	Listed	
Ramsey Farm Stakes
2019	Gentle Ruler	4	Chris Landeros	Ian R. Wilkes	Morsches Stable	1 5/16 miles	2:12.73	$469,000	Listed	
2018	Tricky Escape	5	Christopher P. DeCarlo	Lynn Ashby	Jon A. Marshall	1 5/16 miles	2:13.40	$360,000	Listed	
2017	Kitten's Roar	5	Jose L. Ortiz	Michael J. Maker	Kenneth L. and Sarah K. Ramsey	1 5/16 miles	2:17.19	$330,800	Listed	
Kentucky Downs Ladies Marathon Stakes
2016	Al's Gal	5	Florent Geroux	Michael J. Maker	Kenneth L. and Sarah K. Ramsey	1 5/16 miles	2:12.16	$199,700	Listed	
Fasig-Tipton Ladies Marathon Stakes
2015	Modernstone (GB)	5	Rafael Hernandez	Kelly Rubley	Brous Stable, Gary Barber & Wachtel Stable	1 5/16 miles	2:13.12	$140,000	Listed	
Kentucky Downs Ladies Marathon Stakes
2014	White Rose	4	Shaun Bridgmohan	William I. Mott	Jake Ballis & Rashard Lewis	1 5/16 miles	2:13.76	$190,000		
2013	Mystical Star	5	Brice Blanc	Christophe Clement	Cheyenne Stable	1 5/16 miles	2:11.30	$153,583		
2012	Maid of Heaven	4	Leandro Goncalves	Kellyn Gorder	Dreamfields Farm	1 5/16 miles	2:14.06	$75,000		

Legend:
Turf

== See also ==
- List of American and Canadian Graded races
