= Kentucky Downs Ladies Sprint Stakes =

Kentucky Downs Ladies Sprint Stakes raced as ever Say Die Ladies Sprint Stakes
- Class: Grade I
- Location: Kentucky Downs; Franklin, Kentucky, United States
- Inaugurated: 2013
- Race type: Thoroughbred - Flat racing
- Website: www.kentuckydowns.com

Race information
- Distance: 6 1/2 furlongs
- Surface: Turf
- Track: Left-handed
- Qualification: Fillies and Mares, three years old and older
- Weight: Base weights with allowances: 4-year-olds and up: 125 lbs. 3-year-olds: 122 lbs.
- Purse: $1,750,000 (2026)

The Kentucky Downs Ladies Sprint Stakes, raced as the Never Say Die Ladies Sprint Stakes is a Grade I American Thoroughbred horse race for fillies and mares that are three years old or older, over a distance of 6 1/2 furlongs on the turf held annually in September at Kentucky Downs racetrack in Franklin, Kentucky during their short turf meeting. The event currently carries a purse of $1,750,000 which includes $875,000 from the Kentucky Thoroughbred Development Fund.

== History ==
The race was inaugurated in 2013 with an attractive purse offered of $150,000.

In 2018 the event was upgraded to a Grade III.

With the influx of gaming revenue at Kentucky Downs the purse for the event has risen dramatically to nearly $500,000 offered by 2019.

In 2023 the American Graded Stakes Committee upgraded the event to Grade II status. The committee then upgraded the event again to Grade I status for 2026.

== Records ==
Speed record:

- 6 1/2 furlongs: 1:14.19 - Ag Bullet (2024) (New Track Record)

Margins:

- 5 1/3 lengths: Ag Bullet (2024)

Most wins by a jockey

- 3 – Florent Geroux (2016, 2018, 2023)

Most wins by a trainer

- 3 – Mark E. Casse (2015, 2016, 2020)
- 3 – Wesley A. Ward (2013, 2014, 2022)

Most wins by an owner:

- 2 – Calvin Nguyen & Joey C. Tran (2024, 2025)

== Winners ==
Year	Winner	Age	Jockey	Trainer	Owner	Distance	Time	Purse	Grade	Ref
2026	In Our Time	5	Micah Husbands	Saffie Joseph, Jr.	Resolute Racing and Miller Racing LLC	6 1/2 furlongs	1:16.01	$1,676,500	I	
2025	Ag Bullet	5	Luis Saez	Richard Baltas	Calvin Nyguyen & Joey C. Tran	6 1/2 furlongs	1:14.38	$1,994,300	II	
2024	Ag Bullet	4	Umberto Rispoli	Richard Baltas	Calvin Nguyen & Joey C. Tran	6 1/2 furlongs	1:14.19	$1,378,260	II	
2023	Bay Storm	4	Florent Geroux	Jonathan Thomas	Bridlewood Farm	6 1/2 furlongs	1:17.06	$900,000	II	
2022	Campanelle (IRE)	4	Irad Ortiz Jr.	Wesley A. Ward	Stonestreet Stables	6 1/2 furlongs	1:14.57	$736,030	III	
2021	In Good Spirits	4	John R. Velazquez	Albert Stall, Jr.	Bal Mar Equine	6 1/2 furlongs	1:15.35	$563,100	III	
2020	Got Stormy	5	Tyler Gaffalione	Mark E. Casse	Gary Barber	6 1/2 furlongs	1:15.41	$498,000	III	
2019	Morticia	5	Tyler Gaffalione	George R. Arnold II	G. Watts Humphrey Jr.	6 1/2 furlongs	1:15.85	$471,820	III	
2018	Ruby Notion	5	Florent Geroux	Darrin Miller	Silverton Hill Farm	6 1/2 furlongs	1:15.80	$329,720	III	
2017	Lull	3	Brian Hernandez Jr.	Christophe Clement	Claiborne Farm & Adele Dilschneider	6 1/2 furlongs	1:17.22	$348,000	Listed	
2016	Mississippi Delta	4	Florent Geroux	Mark E. Casse	Jackpot Ranch &. M.G. Rutherford	6 1/2 furlongs	1:18.79	$278,220	Listed	
2015	Sky Treasure	5	Julien R. Leparoux	Mark E. Casse	John C. Oxley	6 1/2 furlongs	1:19.83	$298,400		
2014	Richies Party Girl	3	Rafael Manuel Hernandez	Wesley A. Ward	Richard Ravin & Wesley A. Ward	6 1/2 furlongs	1:16.51	$199,600		
2013	To My Valentine (FR)	3	David R. Flores	Wesley A. Ward	Ice Wine Stable	6 1/2 furlongs	1:17.15	$125,151		
