= Kentucky Downs Turf Sprint Stakes =

- Class: Grade II
- Location: Kentucky Downs; Franklin, Kentucky, United States
- Inaugurated: 1998 (as Kentucky Cup Turf Dash Stakes)
- Race type: Thoroughbred - Flat racing
- Sponsor: Light and Wonder (2026)
- Website: www.kentuckydowns.com

Race information
- Distance: 6 furlongs
- Surface: Turf
- Track: Left-handed
- Qualification: Three years old and older
- Weight: Base weights with allowances 4-year-olds and up: 125 lbs. 3-year-olds: 122 lbs.
- Purse: $1,750,000 (2026)
- Bonuses: Winner automatic entry into Breeders' Cup Turf Sprint

The Kentucky Downs Turf Sprint Stakes is a Grade II American Thoroughbred horse race for three years old or older, over a distance of six furlongs on the turf held annually in September at Kentucky Downs racetrack in Franklin, Kentucky during their short turf meeting. The event currently carries a purse of $1,750,000 which includes $875,000 from the Kentucky Thoroughbred Development Fund.

== History ==
The race was inaugurated in 1998 with an attractive purse offered of $100,000. The event was raced as the Kentucky Cup Turf Dash Stakes as part of the Kentucky Cup.

The event was not held in 2011 and the event renamed in 2016 to the Turf Sprint Stakes

In 2017 the event was upgraded to a Grade III.

With the influx of gaming revenue at Kentucky Downs the purse for the event has risen dramatically to nearly $700,000 offered by 2019.

== Records ==
Speed record:

- 6 furlongs: 1:07.41 - Bran (FR) (2022) (new track record)
- 6 1/2 furlongs: 1:15.72 - Proforma (2018)

Margins:

- 6 lengths – Morluc (2000)

Most wins

- 2 – Hold the Salt (2007, 2008)
- 2 – Gear Jockey (2021, 2023)

Most wins by a jockey

- 4 – Robby Albarado (2000, 2001, 2015, 2016)

Most wins by a trainer

- 3 – George R. Arnold II (2019, 2021, 2023)

Most wins by an owner

- 2 – Cynthia Knight (2007, 2008)
- 2 – Calumet Farm (2021, 2023)

== Winners ==
Year	Winner	Age	Jockey	Trainer	Owner	Distance	Time	Purse	Grade	Ref
Turf Sprint Stakes
2026	Possiblemente	6	José L. Ortiz	Joe Sharp	T & E Racing	6 furlongs	1:09.28	$1,747,025	II	
2025	Bear River	4	James Graham	J. Keith Desormeaux	Charles K. Marquis	6 furlongs	1:07.71	$1,870,000	II	
2024	Cogburn	5	Irad Ortiz Jr.	Steven M. Asmussen	Clark O. Brewster, William L. & Corinne Heiligbrodt	6 furlongs	1:07.68	$1,797,200	II	
2023	Gear Jockey	6	Jose Lezcano	George R. Arnold II	Calumet Farm	6 furlongs	1:10.59	$998,667	II	
2022	Bran (FR)	4	Vincent Chminaud	John W. Sadler	Hronis Racing	6 furlongs	1:07.41	$648,640	II	
2021	Gear Jockey	4	Jose Lezcano	George R. Arnold II	Calumet Farm	6 furlongs	1:07.90	$995,500	III	
2020	Imprimis	6	Irad Ortiz Jr.	Joseph Orseno	Breeze Easy	6 furlongs	1:09.93	$588,000	III	
2019	Totally Boss	4	Florent Geroux	George R. Arnold II	Jim & Susan Hill	6 furlongs	1:09.21	$682,800	III	
2018	Proforma	4	Joe Bravo	Michael Stidham	DARRS	6 1/2 furlongs	1:15.72	$500,000	III	
2017	Hogy	8	Florent Geroux	Michael J. Maker	Michael M. Hui	6 1/2 furlongs	1:16.88	$398,000	III	
2016	Successful Native	5	Robby Albarado	Aubrey A. Maragh	Marco Bommarito	6 1/2 furlongs	1:17.51	$309,997	Listed	
Turf Dash Stakes
2015	Sweet Luca	6	Robby Albarado	Chris M. Block	Fortino	6 1/2 furlongs	1:19.44	$180,000	Listed	
2014	Dimension (GB)	6	Chris Landeros	Conor Murphy	Riverside Bloodstock	6 1/2 furlongs	1:17.16	$136,200		
2013	Longhunter (GB)	5	Alan Garcia	Michael J. Maker	Kenneth L. and Sarah K. Ramsey	6 furlongs	1:10.28	$137,050		
2012	Good Lord	5	Gabriel Saez	Forrest Kaelin	Thomas D. Shank & Stan Young	6 furlongs	1:18.58	$59,875		
2011	Race not held									
2010	Due Date	5	Tony Farina	Steve Margolis	Bert, Elaine & Richard Klein	6 furlongs	1:16.41	$50,000		
2009	Fort Prado	8	Eduardo E. Perez	Chris M. Block	Team Block	6 furlongs	1:11.49	$50,000		
2008	Hold the Salt	6	Rosemary Homeister Jr.	James A. Dodgen	Cynthia Knight	6 furlongs	1:09.15	$100,000	Listed	
2007	Hold the Salt	5	Charles R. Woods Jr.	James A. Dodgen	Cynthia Knight	6 furlongs	1:09.25	$100,000	Listed	
2006	Atticus Kristy	5	Jesus Lopez Castanon	Merrill R. Scherer	Centaur Farms & Daniel Lynch	6 furlongs	1:12.64	$100,000	Listed	
2005	Durban Thunder (BRZ)	4	Calvin H. Borel	Helen Pitts-Blasi	Stud Raca	6 furlongs	1:10.20	$100,000	Listed	
2004	Battle Won	4	Rafael Bejarano	Charles Simon	Jay Manoogian	6 furlongs	1:10.86	$100,000	Listed	
2003	Fredericktown	4	Rafael Bejarano	Darrin Miller	Silverton Hill	6 furlongs	1:12.59	$100,000	Listed	
2002	Red Lightning	4	Calvin H. Borel	Jeffrey D. Thornbury	Philip S. Maas	6 furlongs	1:14.90	$100,000	Listed	
2001	Amazon River	3	Robby Albarado	Kenneth E. Hoffman	Kenneth E. Hoffman	6 furlongs	1:11.34	$100,000	Listed	
2000	Morluc	4	Robby Albarado	Randy L. Morse	Michael P. Cloonan	6 furlongs	1:09.66	$100,000	Listed	
1999	Run Johnny	7	Pat Day	Morris G. Nicks	John Oakley	6 furlongs	1:11.60	$100,000	Listed	
1998	G H's Pleasure	6	Victor Espinoza	Kenneth E. Hoffman	T. Canonie Jr., K. Hoffman, E. Roy, et al.	6 furlongs	1:09.80	$100,000	Listed	

== See also ==
- List of American and Canadian Graded races
