= Franklin-Simpson Stakes =

- Class: Grade II
- Location: Kentucky Downs; Franklin, Kentucky, United States
- Inaugurated: 2017
- Race type: Thoroughbred - Flat racing
- Sponsor: Mint (since 2026)
- Website: Kentucky Downs

Race information
- Distance: 6 1/2 furlongs
- Surface: Turf
- Track: Left-handed
- Qualification: Three-year-olds
- Weight: 124 lbs with allowances
- Purse: $1,500,000 (since 2026)

The Franklin-Simpson Stakes is a Grade II American Thoroughbred horse race for three years olds, over a distance of 6 1/2 furlongs on the turf held annually in September at Kentucky Downs racetrack in Franklin, Kentucky during their short turf meeting. The event currently carries a purse of $1,500,000 which includes $750,000 from the Kentucky Thoroughbred Development Fund.

== History ==
The event was inaugurated on 14 September 2017 over the seven furlong distance and was won by the Wesley A. Ward trained Master Merion by 2 lengths in a time of 1:27.95.

The event was named honor the city, Franklin, and the county Simpson where the Kentucky Downs racetrack is located.

The name of this event was used previously in 2008 for a race which was open for three-year-olds and older over the one mile distance. However, that event was later renamed and the name was idle since 2014.

In 2018 the distance of the event was decreased to 6 1/2 furlongs.

In 2019 the event was upgraded to a Grade III. With the influx of gaming revenue at Kentucky Downs the purse for the event has risen dramatically to nearly $500,000 offered by 2019.

In 2024 the event was upgraded by the Thoroughbred Owners and Breeders Association to a Grade I. The event was downgraded back to Grade II for 2026.

== Records ==
Speed record:

- 6 1/2 furlongs: 1:14.20 Howard Wolowitz (2024)

Margins:

- 4 1/4 lengths: One Timer (2022)

Most wins by an owner:

- 3 - Qatar Racing (2019, 2020, 2021)

Most wins by a jockey:

- 3 - Tyler Gaffalione (2020, 2021, 2025)

Most wins by a trainer:

- 2 - Brendan Walsh (2020, 2021)

== Winners ==
Year	Winner	Age	Jockey	Trainer	Owner	Distance	Time	Purse	Grade	Ref
Franklin-Simpson Stakes
2026	Take Charge Star (IRE)	3	Jamie Spencer	John P. Murtagh	Maribeth Stanford	6 1/2 furlongs	1:15.45	$1,041,525	II	
2025	Troubleshooting	3	Tyler Gaffalione	Gregory Foley	Donamire Farm	6 1/2 furlongs	1:14.33	$1,994,300	I	
2024	Howard Wolowitz	3	Irad Ortiz Jr.	Jose D'Angelo	Gold Square	6 1/2 furlongs	1:14.20	$1,847,100	I	
2023	Private Creed	3	Joel Rosario	Steven M. Asmussen	Mike McCarty	6 1/2 furlongs	1:17.03	$968,000	II	
2022	One Timer	3	Edward T. Baird	Larry Rivelli	Richard Ravin & Patricia's Hope	6 1/2 furlongs	1:14.59	$527,250	II	
2021	The Lir Jet	3	Tyler Gaffalione	Brendan P. Walsh	Qatar Racing and Racehorse Club	6 1/2 furlongs	1:15.38	$413,700	II	
2020	Guildsman (FR)	3	Tyler Gaffalione	Brendan P. Walsh	Qatar Racing	6 1/2 furlongs	1:15.87	$343,875	III	
2019	Legends of War	3	Rafael Bejarano	Doug F. O'Neill	C T R Stables, Qatar Racing & Steve Keh	6 1/2 furlongs	1:16.83	$497,500	III	
2018	Angaston	3	Brian Hernandez Jr.	Lon Wiggins	Twin Magnolia Farm	6 1/2 furlongs	1:17.45	$257,125		
2017	Master Merion	3	Julio A. Garcia	Wesley A. Ward	Vivienne Day & Kate V. Rose	7 furlongs	1:27.95	$250,000		

== See also ==
List of American and Canadian Graded races
