= Nashville Derby =

- Class: Grade II
- Location: Kentucky Downs; Franklin, Kentucky, United States
- Inaugurated: 2014 as Dueling Grounds Derby
- Race type: Thoroughbred – Flat racing
- Sponsor: 1/st Bet (2026)
- Website: Kentucky Downs

Race information
- Distance: 1 5/16 miles
- Surface: Turf
- Track: Left-handed
- Qualification: Three-year-olds
- Weight: 124 lbs with allowances
- Purse: $3,000,000 (2026)

The Nashville Derby is a Grade II American Thoroughbred horse race for three years olds, over a distance of one and five-sixteenths miles on the turf held annually in late August or early September at Kentucky Downs racetrack in Franklin, Kentucky during their short turf meeting.

With a purse of $3,000,000 million for its 2026 running—including $1,250,000 million for Kentucky-bred runners—the Nashville Derby is the richest race to be run at Kentucky Downs, as well as the second richest turf race in the United States behind the Breeders' Cup Turf. The total purse makes the Nashville Derby the richest race in the United States outside of the Kentucky Derby or the Breeders' Cup.

== History ==
The original name of the event, the Dueling Grounds Derby, reflected the former name of Kentucky Downs. The track formerly known as Dueling Grounds Race Course is located very close to the Kentucky-Tennessee border, where numerous duels were held in the 1800s. With the introduction of Instant Racing in 2011, the influx of revenue enabled the administration of the track to add new events.

The inaugural running of the race was on September 6, 2014, the opening day of the five-day meeting at Kentucky Downs. A field of eight entrants lined up and the event was won by the James Lawrence II trained My Afleet who started at 8/1 defeating the favorite Medal Count who earlier in the year finish third in the Belmont Stakes by a nose in a time of 2:14.10. Later, My Afleet continued his career as a steeplechaser winning an event as a ten-year-old in 2021 at Willowdale in Pennsylvania and setting a new track record for the three-mile timber course.

With the influx of gaming revenue at Kentucky Downs the purse for the event has risen dramatically to nearly $750,000 offered by 2020.

From 2016 until 2019 the event was sponsored by the Lexington, Kentucky-based Exacta Systems. Big Ass Fans, also based in Lexington, sponsored the event in 2021 and 2022.

In 2022 the event was upgraded by the Thoroughbred Owners and Breeders Association to a Grade III and was to be held on September 4, but was moved to the next day, Labor Day.

In April 2024 Kentucky Downs announced that the Dueling Grounds Derby would be renamed as the Nashville Derby. Kentucky Downs co-manager Ron Winchell said that the name change reflected the track's close proximity to Nashville, Tennessee. The positioning of the Nashville Derby at the end of August, Winchell added, was designed to attract American and European horses, as well as fit between major three-year-old turf stakes run in Kentucky and New York.

In December 2025 it was announced by the Thoroughbred Owners and Breeders Association that the race would be upgraded to Grade II for 2026.

== Records ==
Speed record:

- 1 5/16 miles: 2:06.76 – Moon Over Miami (2020), Wimbledon Hawkeye (GB) (2025)

Margins:

- 6 1/4 length – Oscar Nominated (2016)

Most wins by an owner:

- No owner has won the event more than once

Most wins by a jockey:

- 2 – Frankie Dettori (2024, 2025)

Most wins by a trainer:

- 2 – Todd A. Pletcher (2018, 2019)
- 2 – William I. Mott (2015, 2020)

== Winners ==
Year	Winner	Jockey	Trainer	Owner	Distance	Time	Purse	Grade	Ref
Nashville Derby
2026	Caroline St. Beat	Tyler Gaffalione	Miguel Clement	Madaket Stables & Steven Bouchey	1 5/16 miles	2:08.49	$1,832,500	II	
2025	Wimbledon Hawkeye (GB)	Frankie Dettori	James Owen	The Gredley Family	1 5/16 miles	2:06.76	$2,780,000	III	
2024	Bellum Justum (IRE)	Frankie Dettori	Andrew M. Balding	King Power Racing	1 5/16 miles	2:07.28	$2,337,160	III	
Dueling Grounds Derby
2023	Anglophile	Declan Cannon	Brian A. Lynch	LFG Racing	1 5/16 miles	2:08.93	$998,000	III	
2022	Kitodan	Gerardo Corrales	Eric N. Foster	Foster Family Racing, Douglas E. Miller & William J. Wargel	1 5/16 miles	2:15.41	$750,000	III	
2021	Accredit	Martin Garcia	Pavel Matejka	Bob Grayson Jr. & Pavel Matejka	1 5/16 miles	2:10.94	$732,375	Listed	
2020	Moon Over Miami	Javier Castellano	William I. Mott	Summer Wind Equine	1 5/16 miles	2:06.76	$707,625	Listed	
2019	Social Paranoia	Jose L. Ortiz	Todd A. Pletcher	The Elkstone Group	1 5/16 miles	2:08.50	$600,000	Listed	
2018	Channel Cat	Luis Saez	Todd A. Pletcher	Calumet Farm	1 5/16 miles	2:15.51	$398,000	Listed	
2017	Big Bend	Drayden Van Dyke	Thomas Proctor	Union Rags Racing	1 5/16 miles	2:11.57	$350,000	Listed	
2016	Oscar Nominated	Florent Geroux	Michael J. Maker	Kenneth L. and Sarah K. Ramsey	1 5/16 miles	2:11.45	$346,710		
2015	Closing Bell	Jose Lezcano	William I. Mott	WinStar Farm	1 5/16 miles	2:17.60	$299,300		
2014	My Afleet	Leandro Goncalves	James L. Lawrence II	Jeffrey S. Amling & Merriefield Farm	1 5/16 miles	2:14.10	$230,417		

Legend:
Turf

== See also ==
- List of American and Canadian Graded races
