= Kentucky Downs =

Horse racing track in Kentucky, US

Coordinates: 36.6415°N 86.5623°W

- Interactive map of Kentucky Downs
- Location: Franklin, Kentucky; near Portland, Tennessee
- Owned by: Ron Winchell & Marc Falcone
- Date opened: April 22, 1990
- Race type: Thoroughbred
- Course type: Turf
- Notable races: Flat racing: (Grade I) Kentucky Downs Ladies Sprint Stakes (Grade II) Nashville Derby (Grade II) Franklin-Simpson Stakes (Grade II) Kentucky Turf Cup (Grade II) Kentucky Downs Turf Sprint Stakes (Grade III) Mint Million; Steeplechase racing: Belle Meade Plantation Stakes

Kentucky Downs is a Thoroughbred horse racing track located on the border between Kentucky and Tennessee, in the city of Franklin, Kentucky, just off Interstate 65. It is unique among American tracks in that it is a European-style course—its surface is all turf (grass) instead of dirt, and it is not oval in shape.

In 2009, the Horseplayers Association of North America (HANA) introduced a rating system for 65 Thoroughbred racetracks in North America. In HANA's most recent ranking in 2017, Kentucky Downs was ranked #1.

== History and information ==
The track was built in 1990 as Dueling Grounds Race Course. The name came from the history of the Sandford Duncan farm, on whose property the track was located. The farm, which was located in a slight corner of what is otherwise a perfectly straight Kentucky-Tennessee border, was the site of numerous duels in the 1800s, because dueling was illegal in Tennessee but not in Kentucky. Sam Houston took part in a duel on the site. Dueling ended in 1827. The track conducted only steeplechase races in its first year, but removed the fences and switched to flat racing in 1992. The first meet featured the Dueling Grounds International, whose $750,000 purse remains the richest in American steeplechase history.

The track underwent a tumultuous series of financial misfortunes, changes in ownership, and legal battles, some of which caused the track to miss its 1997 meet. It also saw use as a concert site and a bingo hall. In 1997, the track was purchased at auction by Turfway Park, Churchill Downs and other investors. Turfway took over day-to-day management of the facility, having some of its existing staff do double duty at the new track. The name was changed to Kentucky Downs in an effort to remove the stigma attached to the Dueling Grounds brand under its previous mismanagement.

Steeplechase racing returned in 2000 with a Grade II event, as well as traditional flat racing. The track went back to flat racing only the following year, but resumed steeplechases again in 2008.

Kentucky Downs hosts a limited live racing meet each year. The 2008 meet features the Kentucky Cup Turf Festival (run one week after the Kentucky Cup race card at Turfway Park) and featuring the Grade 3 Kentucky Cup Turf. During the rest of the year, the track functions as an off-track parimutuel betting site, offering simulcast wagering on most of the country's top tracks. It draws patrons largely from the nearby Nashville, Tennessee market, centered approximately 40 miles (64 km) to the south, where the only other legal gambling options are the Tennessee Lottery and riverboat casinos more than two hours away. With legislation to allow casino gaming at racetracks being a topic of frequent political debate in Kentucky (particularly in the 2007 gubernatorial campaign), Kentucky Downs stands to benefit as the closest casino to metro Nashville, should casinos become legalized.

In March 2007, a partnership led by investors Corey Johnsen and Ray Reid agreed to purchase 85% interest in the track. Johnsen had been president of Lone Star Park and Reid runs a private investment and banking firm. The new partnership will be managed by Reid and Johnsen. Churchill Downs, Turfway Park and the other minority investors retain a 5% share in the track. The transaction was completed on August 6, 2007.

On September 1, 2011, Kentucky Downs introduced Instant Racing, a hybrid between slot machines and parimutuel wagering, where bettors play at a terminal using historical racing data and video. A request by the Family Foundation of Kentucky to halt the use of the games, which the foundation argued were illegal slot machines, was denied by the state appeals court on October 7, 2011.

The 2012 live racing meet was held on September 8, 10, 12, 15 and 19. Racing was also scheduled on September 17, but was cancelled due to heavy rain and soft track. Owner Corey Johnsen indicated in September 2012 that he intended to file for eight racing dates for 2013 (three in late April and five in September).

== Current operations ==
Today, Kentucky Downs consists of three elements:

- The race track, which holds races for four weeks every September.
- Mint Gaming Hall, which has slot machines and poker.
- A branch of the Circa sports book chain, with a television studio that hosts a daily show, VSiN By the Books, which airs on the Vegas Stats & Information Network. One of the hosts, sportscaster Dave Ross, is located there; the other, former Major League Baseball relief pitcher Jensen Lewis, joins the show remotely, usually from his home in Cleveland, Ohio.

=== Stakes events ===
The following important events held at Kentucky Downs.

Grade I

- Kentucky Downs Ladies Sprint Stakes

Grade II

- Franklin-Simpson Stakes
- Kentucky Turf Cup
- Kentucky Downs Turf Sprint Stakes
- Kentucky Downs Ladies Turf Stakes
- Music City Stakes
- Nashville Derby

Grade III

- Dueling Grounds Oaks
- Kentucky Downs Ladies Marathon Stakes
- Mint Millions Invitational Stakes

Listed

- Kentucky Downs Juvenile Sprint
- Kentucky Downs Juvenile Fillies
- Kentucky Downs Juvenile Mile
- One Dreamer Stakes
- Tapit Stakes

== Physical attributes ==
The Kentucky Downs turf course is 1 mile 550 yards (2.112 km) in length, with three turns. The first turn is a sharp left-handed turn to the backstretch. Approximately 7 furlongs to the finish line, the course turns right. It then gradually turns left into the homestretch.

Kentucky Downs is one of two tracks in North America to feature a right turn – the other location is the downhill turf course at Santa Anita Park.

== TV personalities ==
- Jon Lies (2007–present)
- Rick Lee (2000–present)
