= Graded stakes race =

Class of thoroughbred horse race

A graded stakes race is a thoroughbred horse race in the United States that meets the criteria of the American Graded Stakes Committee of the Thoroughbred Owners and Breeders Association (TOBA). A specific grade level (I, II, III or listed) is then assigned to the race, based on statistical analysis of the quality of the field in previous years, provided the race meets the minimum purse criteria for the grade in question. In Canada, a similar grading system is maintained by the Jockey Club of Canada. Graded stakes races are similar to Group races in Europe but the grading is more dynamic in North America.

A high grading can also be used by racetracks to promote the race in question. When determining Eclipse Award winners, racing journalists will consider the number and grade of a horse's stakes wins during the year.

In general, stakes race refers to the stake, or entry fee, owners must pay, which generally forms part of the prize money offered to the top finishers. Not all stakes races are eligible for grading. Notably, races that are restricted to horses bred in a specific state (e.g., the Tiznow Stakes for California-breds) or country (e.g., the races that make up the Canadian Triple Crown, all restricted to Canadian-breds) are excluded, regardless of the purse or quality of field. Conversely, some races that are not technically stakes races (usually invitational races where entry fees are not required by the racetrack) may be eligible for grading if they meet the quality standards.

== History ==
European authorities implemented the Pattern race system in 1972 and requested that North America implement a similar method, leading to the development of the graded stakes system by TOBA in 1973. The first list of North American Graded Stakes was published in 1974. The original purpose of grading was to identify the most competitive races, which helps horsemen make comparisons of the relative quality of bloodstock for breeding and sales purposes.

When the race-grading program was being set up for its 1973 introduction by the American Thoroughbred Owners and Breeders Association it was done so as to match the data formatting in use by the British system being Grade I, Grade II, Grade III. However, the advent of the Internet meant that format would eventually be mostly abandoned in favor of G1, G2, G3. Used by TOBA itself, and most significantly by Equibase Company LLC that is the official supplier of racing information and statistics to America's Best Racing, Breeders' Cup, Daily Racing Form, NTRA, The Jockey Club, TRA, TVG, and Xpressbet. A notable exception to the change in format being the three New York Racing Association tracks.

Fasig-Tipto began including grading information in 1975, Keeneland Association in 1976, and Daily Racing Form in 1978. In 1998, Canada began to grade Canadian races independently.

Listed stakes were first added as a level in 2013.

== Criteria ==
The American Graded Stakes Committee grades only races that:

- Have a purse of at least $75,000 for a listed race, $100,000 for Grade III, $200,000 for Grade II, and $300,000 for Grade I.
- Have been run for two years under fundamentally the same conditions. For example, the race's distance may be slightly altered, but age and sex conditions may not be.
- Restrict entries only by age and sex. For example, a race may be restricted to three-year-old fillies and be eligible for grading, but a race restricted by where a horse is bred is not eligible for grading.
- Have preference conditions written to industry standards that seek to give preference to the best horses.
- Have post-race drug testing managed by a governmental authority.
- Follow rules for androgenic-anabolic steroids and non-steroidal anti-inflammatory drugs, allowing only Boldenone, Nandrolone, Stanozolol, and testosterone. (This is a minimum standard; some racing jurisdictions have even higher restrictions on medications)

In 2008, the committee began requiring that toe grabs on the horseshoe, designed to improve traction, be no longer than 2 millimeters. This was in response to studies by Susan Stover showing that such toe grabs substantially increase the risk of catastrophic racing injuries. Recently, racing officials have also banned the use of furosemide (Lasix) in all Black Type races, which include graded and listed stakes races.

A newly established race may inherit the graded status of a discontinued race if it is held at the same facility under essentially identical conditions as the discontinued race. For example, the inaugural running of the Pegasus World Cup in January 2017 was Grade I, inheriting the status of the discontinued Donn Handicap.

== Levels ==
There are four grade levels, from Listed at the bottom to Grade I at the top. The latter are higher-class races for bigger prizes for horses of the same age group (2, 3 or 3 and up) and may further be restricted by sex. The weight conditions of the races may vary provided they meet the committee's standards to ensure competitiveness. Many grade I races are "weight-for-age", with weights adjusted only according to age and sex, and also there are "set weights" where all horses carry the same weight (usually applicable when all horses are of the same age and sex). Furthermore, there are "conditions" races, in which horses carry weights that are set by conditions, such as having won a certain number of races, or races of a certain value. Finally, some graded stakes are "handicaps", in which an official handicapper assigns weights to each horse in an attempt to equalize the competition.

All Grade I races must have a purse of at least $300,000, but not all races with such high purses are Grade I. For example, a racetrack may offer a high purse to attract better fields so the race will be upgraded in future years. The grade level is assigned by looking at data that indicates quality of the field for the last five years. In order to achieve or maintain a Grade I, it is necessary to attract a competitive field over a number of years.

For graded turf races, track conditions (normally excessive rain) may sometimes force the race to be run on the main (dirt) track. If this happens, the race is automatically downgraded by one grade level for that running only. The Committee then reviews the race within five days and may restore the original grade. For example, a Grade I turf race that is switched to the dirt will be recorded as a Grade II race, unless the committee feels the quality of the race was sufficient to warrant Grade I.

In the United States and Canada, a graded race can be dormant for one year without losing its grade.

== U.S. graded stakes races ==
=== Grade I changes since 2010 ===
The following races have been downgraded from Grade I status since 2010:

- Alfred G. Vanderbilt Handicap at Saratoga (2025)
- Beldame Stakes at Belmont Park (2019)
- Blue Grass Stakes at Keeneland (2017) The race was upgraded to a Grade 1 again in 2022.
- Beverly D. Stakes at Colonial Downs (2024)
- Carter Handicap at Aqueduct (2024)
- Chandelier Stakes at Santa Anita Park (2020)
- Charles Whittingham Memorial Stakes at Hollywood Park (2013)
- Cigar Mile Handicap at Aqueduct (2023)
- Clark Stakes at Churchill Downs (2023)
- Eddie Read Stakes at Del Mar (2016)
- Flower Bowl Stakes at Saratoga (2022)
- Gazelle Stakes at Aqueduct (2013)
- Hollywood Gold Cup Stakes at Santa Anita Park (2024)
- Hollywood Turf Cup Stakes at Hollywood Park (2012)
- Hopeful Stakes at Saratoga (2012) The race was upgraded to a Grade 1 again in 2013.
- Las Virgenes Stakes at Santa Anita Park (2016)
- Los Alamitos Futurity at Los Alamitos (2019)
- Man o' War Stakes at Belmont Park (2024)
- Mother Goose Stakes at Belmont Park (2017)
- Pat O'Brien Stakes at Del Mar (2012)
- Pimlico Special at Pimlico (2011)
- Prioress Stakes at Saratoga (2014)
- Princess Rooney Handicap at Calder (2014)
- Rodeo Drive Stakes at Santa Anita Park (2023)
- Ruffian Handicap at Saratoga (2012)
- Santa Anita Sprint Championship at Santa Anita Park (2020)
- Santa Anita Oaks At Santa Anita Park (2020)
- Santa Margarita Invitational Handicap at Santa Anita Park (2019)
- Santa Monica Stakes at Santa Anita Park (2013)
- Secretariat Stakes at Arlington Park (2022)
- Starlet Stakes at Los Alamitos Race Course (2023)
- Stephen Foster Handicap at Churchill Downs (2019) The race was upgraded to a Grade 1 again in 2023.
- Triple Bend Invitational Handicap at Santa Anita Park (2019)
- United Nations Stakes at Monmouth Park (2024)
- Vosburgh Stakes at Belmont Park (2020)
- Wood Memorial at Aqueduct (2017)
- Woodward Stakes at Belmont Park (2023)
- Zenyatta Stakes at Santa Anita Park (2019)

The Donn Handicap was discontinued after its 2016 edition; its Grade I status was transferred to the Pegasus World Cup, which held its first edition in 2017

The following races have been upgraded to Grade I status since 2010:

- American Turf Stakes at Churchill Downs (2025)
- Breeders' Cup Juvenile Fillies Turf (2012)
- Breeders' Cup Juvenile Turf (2011)
- Breeders' Cup Juvenile Turf Sprint (2022)
- Breeders' Cup Turf Sprint (2012)
- Churchill Downs Stakes (2019)
- Cotillion Stakes at Parx Racing (2012)
- Delaware Handicap at Delaware Park (2013) The race was downgraded to a Grade 2 again in 2018.
- Fourstardave Handicap at Saratoga (2016)
- Franklin-Simpson Stakes at Kentucky Downs (2024)
- Jaipur Invitational Stakes at Belmont Park (2019)
- Jenny Wiley Stakes at Keeneland (2012)
- La Troienne Stakes at Churchill Downs (2014)
- New York Stakes at Belmont Park (2022)
- Saratoga Derby Invitational Stakes at Saratoga (2021)
- Pennsylvania Derby at Parx Racing (2017)
- Woody Stephens Stakes at Belmont Park (2019)
- Blue Grass Stakes at Keeneland (2019)

== See also ==
- Group races
- List of horse races
- List of American and Canadian Graded races
