= Starship Jubilee =

American racehorse

- Sire: Indy Wind
- Grandsire: A.P. Indy
- Dam: Perfectly Wild
- Damsire: Forest Wildcat
- Sex: Mare
- Foaled: March 10, 2013
- Country: United States
- Color: Bay
- Breeder: William P. Sorren
- Owner: Starship Stables (2016-Jan 2017); JN Racing Stables(Jan-Feb 2017); Tino Attard (Feb-May 2017); Kevin Attard and Soli Mehta (May 2017-November 2018); Blue Heaven Farm (from November 2018)
- Trainer: Kevin Dwoskin (2016-Jan 2017); Jorge Navarro (Jan-Feb 2017); Tino Attard (Feb-May 2017); Kevin Attard (from May 2017)
- Record: 38: 19-5-3
- Earnings: US$2,093,069

Major wins
- Nassau Stakes (2017); Dance Smartly Stakes (2017); Sunshine Millions Filly & Mare Turf (2018, 2019, 2020); Canadian Stakes (2018, 2019); E.P. Taylor Stakes (2019); Suwannee River Stakes (2020); Hillsborough Stakes (2020); Ballston Spa Stakes (2020); Woodbine Mile (2020)

Awards
- Canadian Horse of the Year (2019); Canadian Champion Female Turf Horse (2017, 2018, 2019)

Starship Jubilee (foaled March 10, 2013) is a retired American Thoroughbred racehorse who was named the 2019 Canadian Horse of the Year after recording three stakes wins that year including the Grade I E. P. Taylor Stakes. She was also named Canadian Champion Female Turf Horse in 2017, 2018 and 2019. In 2020, she has won five of seven starts including the Woodbine Mile.

Starship Jubilee was bred in Florida and began her career at Gulfstream Park in the claiming ranks. In 2017, she was claimed by trainer Tino Attard for $16,000. Tino Attard placed her with his son Kevin Attard, who relocated her to Woodbine Racecourse in Canada where she soon established herself as a top competitor on the turf. She has since won graded stakes in both Canada and the United States and has earned over US$2 million.

== Background ==
Starship Jubilee is a bay mare who was bred in Florida by William Soren. She was sired by Indy Wind, a son of A.P. Indy. Indy Wind won five black type events and was graded stakes placed but attracted little interest as a stallion. Starship Jubilee is his second stakes winner from the 58 starters he sired in his first eight crops of racing age. Starship Jubilee's dam, Perfectly Wild, is an unraced daughter of Forest Wildcat out of Perfect Arc, a multiple graded stakes winner but otherwise considered a disappointment as a broodmare.

Starship Jubilee has changed owners and trainers several times. She was sold as a yearling at the 2014 Ocala Breeders' Sale for $6,500 to Laurence Leavy. She was offered as a two-year-old in training in April 2015 but did not meet her reserve on a final bid of $34,000. In her first races, her owner was Starship Stables and her trainer was Steven Dwoskin. In January 2017, she was claimed by Jorge Navarro for JN Racing Stable, and was claimed again in February 2017 by Tino Attard. Tino Attard transferred her to his son Kevin Attard, who became her trainer and co-owner with Soli Mehta. In November 2018, she was offered for sale at Keeneland as a racing or breeding prospect but failed to meet her reserve at a final bid of $425,000. Afterwards, she was privately sold to Blue Heaven Farms while continuing to be trained by Attard.

== Racing career ==
Starship Jubilee did not race at age two. She made her first start on May 5, 2016, at age three in a $50,000 maiden claiming race at Gulfstream Park over a distance of six furlongs on the dirt. She was never a factor and finished last in a field of six. She made her next start on June 1 at Gulfstream Park, where she won a $35,000 maiden claiming race run over a distance of five furlongs on the turf. Stepped up into allowance race company, she finished off the board in her next three starts. On September 22, she was dropped back into the claiming ranks and won by a neck over R Sweet Exchange. She made her final start of the year in an allowance race at Gulfstream Park West on October 14, where she finished fourth after being bumped at the start. She finished the year with two wins from seven starts and earnings of $34,350.

=== 2017: four-year-old season ===
Starship Jubilee began her four-year-old campaign on January 4, 2017, at Gulfstream Park in a claiming race over 7 1/2 furlongs on the turf. She was close to the early pace and closed steadily to win by 1 3/4 lengths. She was claimed for $16,000 by trainer Jorge Navarro on behalf of JN Racing Stables.

Starship Jubilee made her next start on February 12 in another claiming race at Gulfstream, finishing second after stumbling to her nose at the start. She was claimed by Tino Attard, for whom she won her next three races – all allowance races at Gulfstream Park, the latter of which she won by 1 1/4 lengths as the odds-on favorite.

Tino Attard then transferred Starship Jubilee to his son, Kevin Attard, based at Woodbine Racetrack in Toronto, Canada. Attard stepped her sharply up in class by entering her in the Grade II Nassau Stakes on May 27, run at a distance of one mile over a yielding turf course. The favorite was champion Catch a Glimpse, but she fell going into the far turn and was vanned off. Starship Jubilee stumbled at the break and was last for the first half mile but started to make up ground on the far turn and pulled away down the stretch to win by 2 1/2 lengths. "We were fortunate enough to win the shake," said Attard, referring to the claim his father had made in February. "She's trained phenomenally well and had a couple of fantastic breezes. I know we were an underdog, but she's really blossomed since we've got her. I was very excited about her chances today."

Starship Jubilee extended her winning streak to five in the Dance Smartly Stakes on July 2, stretching out in distance to 1 1/4 miles. The field included odds-on favorite Suffused, and 5-2 second choice Rainha Da Bateria, with two graded stakes wins to her credit. Starship Jubilee broke well and rated a few lengths off the early pace, then moved to the lead at the top of the stretch. Rainha Da Bateria made a late run and steadily made up ground. Starship Jubilee responded with an all out drive and the two finished in a dead heat. "When I turned for home, I think I moved a little early because I had so much horse," said jockey Eurico Rosa da Silva. "But I said, 'I'm going to try my luck here.'"

Starship Jubilee made her next start against male horses in the Sky Classic Stakes on August 20. She raced on or near the lead for the first mile but could not match the closing drive of the other horses and finished fifth. In the Canadian Stakes on September 16, she again raced close to the pace and took the lead in the stretch, but was outfinished by Quidura and Elysea's World to finish third. She made her final start of the year on December 2 in the Claiming Crown Tiara Stakes at Gulfstream Park, a race restricted to horses who had been entered in claiming races for $25,000 or less in the previous two years. She again led in mid-stretch but could not match the closing speed of Martini Glass and Peru, finishing 1 3/4 lengths back in third.

She finished the year with six wins from ten starts and earnings of $262,311. Despite being a Florida bred, Starship Jubilee was eligible for the Canadian Sovereign Awards, which simply require that a horse make at least three starts during the year in the country. She was voted the Canadian Champion Female Turf Horse by 152 votes to 81 for Inflexibility.

=== 2018: five-year-old season ===
Starship Jubilee started her five-year-old campaign on January 20, 2018, in the Sunshine Millions Filly and Mare Turf, a race at Gulfstream Park restricted to Florida-bred fillies and mares. She rated a few lengths behind the early pace set by Daddy's Boo, then gradually pulled past to win by a length. In her next start on February 17, she finished second by a neck to Glory to Kitten after being outkicked in the closing strides. She was then given a layoff and shipped north to Woodbine, where she finished fourth in the Nassau Stakes and sixth in the Dance Smartly.

After the three race losing streak, Starship Jubilee made her next start in an optional claiming race on August 6. She stalked the early pace then took the lead on the far turn and won easily by 3 3/4 lengths. She followed up on September 15 by winning the Canadian Stakes with a late run, easily defeating the highly regarded New Money Honey and Inflexibility, both trained by Chad Brown. The key to the win was getting her to relax early in the race, saving energy for the finish. "I made a few mistakes with her early this year," said Attard. "We sent her home for a break and she kind of just didn't swing back after that vacation. We needed a confidence builder in her and we found one for her, and she was pretty authoritative that day. She came into this race and she worked lights out last week, and I just had a good feeling that, if we had a good trip, she'd come running down the lane."

On October 13, Starship Jubilee finished fourth in the E. P. Taylor Stakes after setting the early pace. She was then offered at the Keeneland November Breeding Stock sale but failed to meet her reserve on a final bid of $425,000. She was subsequently sold to Blue Heaven Farm, whose owners were primarily interested in her as a broodmare prospect but decided to keep her in training. She made her final start of the year for her new connections in the Claiming Crown Tiara at Gulfstream Park on December 1, finishing fourth. She earned her second Sovereign Award as Canada's champion turf female.

=== 2019: six-year-old season ===
Starship Jubilee began her six-year-old campaign on January 19, 2019, with a second win in the Sunshine Millions Filly & Mare Turf. She rated a few lengths behind the early pacesetter then started her drive on the far turn to win by 4 1/2 lengths. "It's just nice to see her kind of run to her potential," said Attard. "Obviously, she's run against horses in graded, open company, so when you see them in a restricted race, it almost feels like there's more pressure on you. I was just happy to see her perform as she did and win for the new connections as well."

Attard gave the mare a long layoff then entered her in the Nassau Stakes at Woodbine on May 26. After rating for the first half mile, Starship Jubilee went to the lead on the far turn and opened a lead of three lengths in mid-stretch. However, she was caught near the finish line by a fast closing Secret Message to finish second. She then finished second in the Dance Smartly Stakes at Woodbine on June 29 behind Holy Helena. On August 24, she was entered in the Ballston Spa Stakes at Saratoga. She fought with her jockey during the early portion of the race, "skygazing past the stands". She eventually settled and made a strong run in the stretch to finish third in a blanket finish. "She was a little rank early, and the pace was slower than I'd anticipated," said Attard. "I thought she ran a great race, considering."

Starship Jubilee returned to Woodbine for her next start in the Canadian Stakes on September 14. This time she went to the early lead, pressed by Dixie Moon for the first three-quarters of a mile. Dixie Moon then tired and Starship Jubilee opened up a large lead down the stretch, winning by 4 1/4 lengths over Magnetic Charm, who beat out favorite CompetitionofIdeas and Holy Helena in a blanket finish for second. Attard credited jockey Luis Contreras for helping the mare adjust her running style. "He did a great job. She broke sharp, he got her to relax pretty well, and she was uncontested from start to finish."

Starship Jubilee made her next start in the E. P. Taylor Stakes at Woodbine on October 12. She faced a strong international field including favorite Red Tea, Durance and Imperial Charm – all Group One-placed in Europe earlier in the year. Red Tea went to the early lead and set a slow pace. Starship Jubilee sat just a length back, then made her move on the far turn. She took the lead at the head of the stretch and held off a late run from Durance to win by a length. ""I got so confident on the last turn," said Contreras. "When we straightened away to make a run, she just exploded."

The win took Starship Jubilee's career earnings over the US$1 million mark. She also earned a $50,000 bonus by scoring the most points in the newly introduced "Ladies of the Lawn Series" at Woodbine. The E. P. Taylor was not only her first Grade I win, it was also the first Grade I for Attard. ""To be honest with you, she's been so consistent for such a long time, I don't think of her as a $16,000 claimer at all, at any point," said Attard. "She's just been such a wonderful horse, and it's been a privilege training her.To see her come from where she has, that's an extra really special feeling as well, said Attard. She's just been such a wonderful horse, and it's been a privilege training her."

Starship Jubilee made her final start of the year in the Cardinal Stakes at Churchill Downs on November 28. Going off as the 1-2 favorite, she was well back early then made a strong move around the far turn. She took the lead in mid-stretch but could not match the closing drive of longshot Kallio and finished second.

At the 2019 Sovereign Awards, Starship Jubilee was named Canadian Horse of the Year in a close vote with veteran sprinter Pink Lloyd. She was also named Canadian Champion Female Turf Horse for the third time.

=== 2020: seven-year-old campaign ===
Starship Jubilee's connections originally planned to retire her at the end of 2019 but then decided to keep her in training. "I can tell you she's in good health, she loves her job, she enjoys what she's doing," said Attard. "We're just going to take it race by race and let her kind of determine her future." She made her seven-year-old debut on January 18 at Gulfstream Park where she earned her third win in the Sunshine Millions Filly & Mare Turf. She took the lead soon after the start and was never challenged, winning by 3 1/4 lengths.

She made her next start in the Suwannee River Stakes at Gulfstream Park on February 8. She was the second betting choice in the field behind Magic Star, who was coming off a win in the Marshua's River. Starship Jubilee rated behind the early pace then made her move entering the stretch, drawing off to win by 4 1/4 lengths. It was her first graded stakes win in the United States: her previous stakes wins at Gulfstream had all come in restricted company. "Today, just to see her accelerate and win by open lengths, I wasn't expecting that," said Attard. "I thought it was going to be a dogfight to the wire. I was pretty impressed with her today, no doubt about it."

Starship Jubilee extended her winning streak to three by taking the Hillsborough Stakes at Tampa Bay Downs on March 7 as the heavy favorite. "This is the type of horse you can do whatever you want — you can dictate the pace, or you can come from behind," said jockey Javier Castellano. "She's such a classy horse. I enjoyed the ride, and I'm very fortunate to be part of it. It looks like she is getting better and better and better."

Attard relocated his stable from Florida to Ontario on March 24, just ahead of a border closure prompted by the COVID-19 pandemic. Starship Jubilee's return to racing was delayed by the shutdown of Woodbine during the pandemic lockdown: it reopened on June 3 under Ontario's stage 1 guidelines. Attard considered entering her in the Nassau Stakes at the end of June, but ultimately scheduled her return for the Ballston Spa Stakes at Saratoga on July 25. The heavy favourite was Sistercharlie, the 2018 American Champion Female Turf Horse. Starship Jubilee rated behind the early pace then moved to the front in mid stretch, winning by a neck over Call Me Love.

Starship Jubilee finished fourth in her next start, the Diana Stakes at Saratoga on August 23. She then returned to Canada for the Woodbine Mile on September 19, where she went off at odds of 6–1 in a field of eight. The favorites were War of Will (2019 Preakness, 2020 Maker's Mark Mile) and March to the Arch (Sunshine Millions Turf, King Edward Stakes). Starship Jubilee rated in the middle of the pack, then started her move on the far turn. She pulled into the lead in the final furlong and comfortably held off March to the Arch to win by a length. "Around the 5/16ths pole, I had tons (of horse), and I waited for a chance to tip her out and ask her to run," said jockey Justin Stein, riding the mare for the first time. "She's so honest and wants to win more than anybody else out there. I watched her replays... she's just gritty. She just waited for her cue and took off like a scalded cat. She was gone."

Starship Jubilee made her final start in the Breeders' Cup Filly & Mare Turf at Keeneland on November 7. She stumbled to her nose at the break, dislodging jockey Florent Geroux and did not finish. Horse and jockey were both unharmed. "Once you get past being thankful that everyone was okay, then just sort of the heartbreak, devastation part of it settles in," said Adam Corndorf, vice-president of Blue Heavens Farm. "We're a small family operation. We don't have five, six runners in the Breeders' Cup every year that it is easy to just accept this and move on. This was a big deal for us. She is the best horse we've ever had and the best horse we probably ever will."

=== Statistics ===
Date	Age	Distance	Race	Grade	Track	Surface	Odds	Field	Finish	Time	Margin	Jockey	Trainer	Owner	Ref
May 5, 2016	3	6 furlongs	Maiden claiming		Gulfstream Park	Dirt	19.00	6	6	1:11.37	(18 1/2 lengths)	Eddie Castro	Steven Dwoskin	Starship Stables	
Jun 1, 2016	3	5 furlongs	Maiden claiming		Gulfstream Park	Turf	28.40	7	1	55.93	1 3/4 lengths	Luca Panici	Steven Dwoskin	Starship Stables	
Jun 24, 2016	3	5 furlongs	Allowance optional claiming		Gulfstream Park	Turf	6.60	9	5	56.18	(4 lengths)	Luca Panici	Steven Dwoskin	Starship Stables	
Aug 4, 2016	3	5 furlongs	Allowance optional claiming		Gulfstream Park	Turf	11.70	9	4	56.40	(4 1/2 lengths)	Luca Panici	Steven Dwoskin	Starship Stables	
Aug 25, 2016	3	5 furlongs	Allowance optional claiming		Gulfstream Park	Turf	4.70	8	6	56.32	(5 1/4 lengths)	Luca Panici	Steven Dwoskin	Starship Stables	
Sep 22, 2016	3	5 furlongs	Claiming		Gulfstream Park	Turf	1.70*	7	1	56.60	Neck	Luca Panici	Steven Dwoskin	Starship Stables	
Oct 14, 2016	3	5 furlongs	Allowance optional claiming		Gulfstream Park West	Turf	7.80	8	4	57.20	(5 1/4 lengths)	Emisael Jaramillo	Steven Dwoskin	Starship Stables	
Jan 4, 2017	4	7 1/2 furlongs	Claiming		Gulfstream Park	Turf	5.60	11	1	1:32.92	1 3/4 lengths	Luis Saez	Steven Dwoskin	Starship Stables (Note: claimed by JN Racing Stables)	
Feb 12, 2017	4	7 1/2 furlongs	Claiming		Gulfstream Park	Turf	1.30*	11	2	1:28.85	(3/4 lengths)	Luis Saez	Jorge Navarro	JN Racing Stables (Note: claimed by Tino Attard)	
Mar 9, 2017	4	1 mile	Allowance optional claiming		Gulfstream Park	Turf	3.10	8	1	1:34.14	4 3/4 lengths	Jose Lezcano	Tino Attard	Tino Attard	
Mar 22, 2017	4	1 mile	Starter allowance		Gulfstream Park	Turf	30.30*	6	1	1:33.50	3 3/4 lengths	Jose Lezcano	Tino Attard	Tino Attard	
Apr 21, 2017	4	1 mile	Allowance optional claiming		Gulfstream Park	Turf	0.60*	6	1	1:34.33	1 1/4 lengths	Nik Juarez	Tino Attard	Tino Attard	
May 27, 2017	4	1 mile	Nassau Stakes	II	Woodbine	Turf	10.45	7	1	1:36.86	2 1/2 lengths	Eurico Rosa da Silva	Kevin Attard	Kevin Attard and Soli Mehta	
July 2, 2017	4	1 1/4 miles	Dance Smartly Stakes	II	Woodbine	Turf	5.55	8	1 (Note: dead heat with Rainha Da Bateria)	2:01.81	1/2 length (Note: margin to the third place finisher)	Eurico Rosa da Silva	Kevin Attard	Kevin Attard and Soli Mehta	
Aug 20, 2017	4	1 3/8 miles	Sky Classic Stakes	II	Woodbine	Turf	2.80	6	5	2:14.95	(5 lengths)	Luis Contreras	Kevin Attard	Kevin Attard and Soli Mehta	
Sep 16, 2017	4	1 1/8 miles	Canadian Stakes	II	Woodbine	Turf	7.75	7	3	1:45.26	(1 3/4 lengths)	Eurico Rosa da Silva	Kevin Attard	Kevin Attard and Soli Mehta	
Dec 2, 2017	4	1 1/16 miles	Claiming Crown Tiara Stakes		Gulfstream Park	Turf	1.60*	11	3	1:46.65	(1 3/4 lengths)	Jose Lezcano	Kevin Attard	Kevin Attard and Soli Mehta	
Jan 20, 2018	5	1 1/16 miles	Sunshine Millions Filly & Mare Turf		Gulfstream Park	Turf	1.00*	10	1	1:41.03	1 length	Jose Lezcano	Kevin Attard	Kevin Attard and Soli Mehta	
Feb 17, 2018	5	1 1/16 miles	Mary Todd Stakes		Gulfstream Park	Turf	1.10*	9	2	1:41.70	(Neck)	Jose Lezcano	Kevin Attard	Kevin Attard and Soli Mehta	
May 27, 2018	5	1 mile	Nassau Stakes	II	Woodbine	Turf	0.90*	6	4	1:32.74	(3 3/4 lengths)	Eurico Rosa da Silva	Kevin Attard	Kevin Attard and Soli Mehta	
June 30, 2018	5	1 1/4 miles	Dance Smartly Stakes	II	Woodbine	Turf	8.90	9	6	1:59.51	(10 lengths)	Eurico Rosa da Silva	Kevin Attard	Kevin Attard and Soli Mehta	
Aug 6, 2018	5	1 1/16 miles	Starter Optional Claiming		Woodbine	Turf	0.65*	5	1	1:39.46	3 3/4 lengths	Eurico Rosa da Silva	Kevin Attard	Kevin Attard and Soli Mehta	
Sep 15, 2018	5	about 1 1/8 miles	Canadian Stakes	II	Woodbine	Turf	11.65	6	1	1:42.91	3 1/4 lengths	Eurico Rosa da Silva	Kevin Attard	Kevin Attard and Soli Mehta	
Oct 13, 2018	5	1 1/4 miles	E. P. Taylor Stakes	I	Woodbine	Turf	8.10	9	4	2:05.10	(1 1/2 lengths)	Luis Contreras	Kevin Attard	Kevin Attard and Soli Mehta	
Dec 1, 2018	5	1 1/16 miles	Claiming Crown Tiara		Gulfstream Park	Turf	0.70*	12	4	1:41.87	(3 3/4 lengths)	Paco Lopez	Kevin Attard	Blue Heaven Farm	
Jan 19, 2019	6	1 1/16 miles	Sunshine Millions Filly & Mare Turf		Gulfstream Park	Turf	1.10*	13	1	1:43.33	4 1/2 lengths	Javier Castellano	Kevin Attard	Blue Heaven Farm	
May 26, 2019	6	1 mile	Nassau Stakes	II	Woodbine	Turf	0.90*	6	2	1:35.30	(3/4 lengths)	Luis Contreras	Kevin Attard	Blue Heaven Farm	
Jun 29, 2019	6	1 1/4 miles	Dance Smartly Stakes	II	Woodbine	Turf	2.25	8	2	2:02.08	(1 1/4 lengths)	Luis Contreras	Kevin Attard	Blue Heaven Farm	
Aug 24, 2019	6	1 1/16 miles	Ballston Spa Stakes	II	Saratoga	Turf	6.80	9	3	1:41.39	(1/2 length)	Jose Lezcano	Kevin Attard	Blue Heaven Farm	
Sep 14, 2019	6	about 1 1/8 miles	Canadian Stakes	II	Woodbine	Turf	2.20	7	1	1:45.84	4 1/4 lengths	Luis Contreras	Kevin Attard	Blue Heaven Farm	
Oct 12, 2019	6	1 1/4 miles	E. P. Taylor Stakes	I	Woodbine	Turf	3.50	10	1	2:03.29	1 length	Luis Contreras	Kevin Attard	Blue Heaven Farm	
Nov 28, 2019	6	1 1/8 miles	Cardinal Stakes	III	Churchill Downs	Turf	0.50*	11	2	1:55.07	(3 lengths)	Luis Contreras	Kevin Attard	Blue Heaven Farm	
Jan 18, 2019	7	1 1/16 miles	Sunshine Millions Filly & Mare Turf		Gulfstream Park	Turf	0.40*	8	1	1:42.57	3 1/4 lengths	Javier Castellano	Kevin Attard	Blue Heaven Farm	
Feb 8, 2019	7	1 1/8 miles	Suwannee River Stakes	III	Gulfstream Park	Turf	1.20	6	1	1:47.54	4 1/4 lengths	Luis Saez	Kevin Attard	Blue Heaven Farm	
Mar 7, 2019	7	1 1/8 miles	Hillsborough Stakes	II	Tampa Bay Downs	Turf	1.20*	11	1	1:47.83	1 1/4 lengths	Javier Castellano	Kevin Attard	Blue Heaven Farm	
Jul 25, 2020	7	1 1/16 miles	Ballston Spa Stakes	II	Saratoga	Turf	3.10	5	1	1:41.76	Neck	Javier Castellano	Kevin Attard	Blue Heaven Farm	
Aug 23, 2020	7	1 1/8 miles	Diana Stakes	I	Saratoga	Turf	6.70	5	4	1:45.88	(4 lengths)	Jose Ortiz	Kevin Attard	Blue Heaven Farm	
Sep 19, 2020	7	1 mile	Woodbine Mile	I	Woodbine	Turf	5.75	8	1	1:32.06	1 length	Justin Stein	Kevin Attard	Blue Heaven Farm	
Nov 7, 2020	7	1 3/16 miles	Breeders' Cup Filly & Mare Turf	I	Keeneland	Turf	14.60	14	DNF (Note: did not finish after dislodging rider)	1:52.72	n/a	Florent Geroux	Kevin Attard	Blue Heaven Farm	

An asterisk after the odds means Starship Jubilee was the post time favorite.

== Retirement ==
Starship Jubilee was retired after the 2020 Breeders' Cup. She will be bred to Medaglia d'Oro in 2021.

== Pedigree ==
Pedigree of Starship Jubilee, bay mare, March 10, 2013
Sire Indy Wind 2002	A.P. Indy; 1989	Seattle Slew	Bold Reasoning
Sire Indy Wind 2002	A.P. Indy; 1989	Seattle Slew	My Charmer
Sire Indy Wind 2002	A.P. Indy; 1989	Weekend Surprise	Secretariat
Sire Indy Wind 2002	A.P. Indy; 1989	Weekend Surprise	Lassie Dear
Sire Indy Wind 2002	Zagora; 1995	Kingmambo	Mr. Prospector
Sire Indy Wind 2002	Zagora; 1995	Kingmambo	Miesque
Sire Indy Wind 2002	Zagora; 1995	Late Bloomer	Stage Door Johnny
Sire Indy Wind 2002	Zagora; 1995	Late Bloomer	Dunce Cap II
Dam Perfectly Wild 2003	Forest Wildcat; 1991	Storm Cat	Storm Bird
Dam Perfectly Wild 2003	Forest Wildcat; 1991	Storm Cat	Terlingua
Dam Perfectly Wild 2003	Forest Wildcat; 1991	Victoria Beauty	Bold Native
Dam Perfectly Wild 2003	Forest Wildcat; 1991	Victoria Beauty	Abifaith
Dam Perfectly Wild 2003	Perfect Arc; 1992	Brown Arc	Alleged
Dam Perfectly Wild 2003	Perfect Arc; 1992	Brown Arc	Brown Berry
Dam Perfectly Wild 2003	Perfect Arc; 1992	Podeica (ARG)	Petronisi (GB)
Dam Perfectly Wild 2003	Perfect Arc; 1992	Podeica (ARG)	Indian Order (family: 16-c)

Starship Jubilee is inbred 4S x 5D to Secretariat, meaning Secretariat appears in the fourth generation on the sire's side of the pedigree and in the fifth generation on the dam's side. She is also inbred 5S x 5D to Raise a Native.
