= Churchill Distaff Turf Mile Stakes =

- Class: Grade II
- Location: Churchill Downs; Louisville, Kentucky, United States
- Inaugurated: 1983 (as Twin Spires Stakes)
- Race type: Thoroughbred - Flat racing
- Sponsor: Longines (2020)
- Website: Churchill Downs

Race information
- Distance: 1 mile (8 furlongs)
- Surface: Turf
- Track: Left-handed
- Qualification: Fillies & Mare, four-years-old and older
- Weight: 123lbs with allowances
- Purse: $1,000,000 (2026)

The Churchill Distaff Turf Mile Stakes is a Grade II American thoroughbred horse race for fillies and mares aged four and older over a distance of one mile on the turf held annually in early May on the Kentucky Derby day meeting at Churchill Downs in Louisville, Kentucky during the spring meeting.

== History ==
This race was inaugurated on 7 May 1983 as the Twin Spires Stakes with conditions for three year olds only over a distance of 1 1/8 miles on the dirt. The event was won by Le Cou Cou after he was declared the winner after racing stewards disqualified High Honors who lugged in the straight and interfered with Le Cou Cou.

The event was idle for three years and was renewed in 1987 at a shorter distance of 1 1/16 miles. The event was renamed Capital Holding Twin Spires Stakes in 1988 the first on many name changes and was run again with that name in 1989.

In 1990, the event was moved to turf and conditions were modified to the current fillies and mares aged three and older.

The event was classified as Grade III in 1997. The American Graded Stakes Committee upgraded the race to its current Grade II status in 2009. In 2009, this race was upgraded from a Grade III to a Grade II event.

The event has had many different sponsors which have been reflected in the name of the event. In 2000, Churchill Downs administration renamed the event to the current Churchill Distaff Turf Mile Stakes while still accepting sponsorship. With added high-profile sponsorship the event has attracted high quality runners in recent years. Tepin, dual winner of the event in 2015 and 2016 won the 2015 Breeders' Cup Mile and in 2016 the prestigious Canadian Grade I Woodbine Mile was crowned US Champion Female Turf Horse in both years.

== Records ==
Speed record:

- 1 mile: 1:33.96 - Heat Haze (GB) (2003)

Margins

- 5 lengths - Fast Forward (1987)

Most wins:

- 2 - Foresta (1990, 1991)
- 2 - Tepin (2015, 2016)
- 2 - Beau Recall (IRE) (2019, 2020)

Most wins by a jockey:

- 5 - Pat Day (1987, 1988, 1989, 1993, 1995)

Most wins by a trainer:

- 5 - Chad C. Brown (2017, 2021, 2022, 2023, 2024)

Most wins by an owner:

- 3 - Juddmonte Farms (2003, 2006, 2011)

== Winners ==
Year	Winner	Age	Jockey	Trainer	Owner	Distance	Time	Purse	Grade	Ref
Churchill Downs Distaff Turf Mile Stakes
2026	Classic Q	4	John R. Velazquez	Mark E. Casse	Gary Barber, Blue Crevalle Racing, and Eclipse Thoroughbred Partners	1 mile	1:34.71	$976,000	II	
2025	Simply in Front	4	Luis Saez	Eddie Kenneally	Colebrook Farms	1 mile	1:35.46	$740,670	II	
2024	Chili Flag (FR)	5	Irad Ortiz Jr.	Chad C. Brown	Madaket Stables, Michael Dubb & Michael E. Kisber	1 mile	1:35.95	$665,000	II	
2023	Fluffy Socks	5	Irad Ortiz Jr.	Chad C. Brown	Head Of Plains Partners	1 mile	1:35.53	$500,000	II	
2022	Speak Of The Devil (FR)	5	Flavien Prat	Chad C. Brown	Peter M. Brant	1 mile	1:37.47	$500,000	II	
2021	Blowout (GB)	5	Flavien Prat	Chad C. Brown	Peter M. Brant	1 mile	1:36.30	$500,000	II	
2020	Beau Recall (IRE)	6	Manuel Franco	Brad H. Cox	Slam Dunk Racing & Medallion Racing	1 mile	1:35.39	$500,000	II	
2019	Beau Recall (IRE)	5	Irad Ortiz Jr.	Brad H. Cox	Slam Dunk Racing & Medallion Racing	1 mile	1:37.12	$400,000	II	
2018	Proctor's Ledge	4	John R. Velazquez	Brendan P. Walsh	Patricia L. Moseley	1 mile	1:36.30	$300,000	II	
2017	Roca Rojo (IRE)	5	Florent Geroux	Chad C. Brown	Sheep Pond Partners, Newport Stables & Bradley Thoroughbreds	1 mile	1:37.53	$300,000	II	
2016	Tepin	5	Julien R. Leparoux	Mark E. Casse	Robert E. Masterson	1 mile	1:34.36	$300,000	II	
2015	Tepin	4	Julien R. Leparoux	Mark E. Casse	Robert E. Masterson	1 mile	1:34.12	$300,000	II	
2014	Coffee Clique	4	Javier Castellano	Brian A. Lynch	Amerman Racing (Jerry & Joan Amerman)	1 mile	1:34.66	$336,900	II	
2013	Stephanie's Kitten	4	Julien R. Leparoux	Wayne M. Catalano	Kenneth and Sarah Ramsey	1 mile	1:37.94	$288,750	II	
2012	Hungry Island	4	John R. Velazquez	Claude R. McGaughey III	Emory A. Hamilton	1 mile	1:36.20	$223,400	II	
2011	Aviate (GB)	4	Kent J. Desormeaux	William I. Mott	Juddmonte Farms	1 mile	1:36.67	$227,800	II	
2010	Phola	4	Ramon A. Dominguez	Todd A. Pletcher	William & Graydon Patterson, George Saufley & J.J. Pletcher	1 mile	1:38.35	$223,200	II	
2009	Tizaqueena	4	Jamie Theriot	Michael Stidham	Darley Stable	1 mile	1:38.86	$238,600	II	
2008	Bayou's Lassie	5	Edgar S. Prado	Dale L. Romans	Jacks or Better Farm	1 mile	1:37.70	$169,050	III	
2007	Take the Ribbon	4	Rafael Bejarano	Wallace Dollase	Eurowest Bloodstock	1 mile	1:36.89	$166,350	III	
2006	Mirabilis	4	Pat Valenzuela	Robert J. Frankel	Juddmonte Farms	1 mile	1:35.93	$115,600	III	
2005	Miss Terrible (ARG)	6	Alex O. Solis	Bradley S. Ross	Carol & Charles Hammersmith	1 mile	1:35.89	$112,200	III	
2004	Shaconage	4	Brice Blanc	Mitch Shirota	Andrena Van Doren	1 mile	1:36.10	$113,300	III	
2003	Heat Haze (GB)	4	Jose Valdivia Jr.	Robert J. Frankel	Juddmonte Farms	1 mile	1:33.96	$117,000	III	
2002	Stylish	4	Jerry D. Bailey	William I. Mott	The Thoroughbred Corporation	1 mile	1:35.72	$115,200	III	
2001	Iftiraas (GB)	4	Jerry D. Bailey	William I. Mott	Gary A. Tanaka	1 mile	1:36.69	$113,600	III	
2000	Don't Be Silly	5	Jorge F. Chavez	Merrill R. Scherer	Robert Hall, Dan Lynch & Merrill R. Scherer	1 mile	1:34.78	$115,400	III	
Ashland Mile Stakes
1999	Shires Ende	4	John R. Velazquez	Richard R. Scherer	Carolyn K. Friedberg	1 mile	1:35.43	$119,600	III	
Aegon Mile Stakes
1998	Witchful Thinking	4	Shane Sellers	Niall M. O'Callaghan	Leslie R. Grimm	1 mile	1:37.23	$120,800	III	
Providian Mile Stakes
1997	B. A. Valentine	4	Shane Sellers	Dale L. Romans	Alberta Butner	1 mile	1:36.98	$115,800	III	
1996	Apolda	5	Jerry D. Bailey	William I. Mott	Allen E. Paulson	1 mile	1:36.50	$85,050	Listed	
1995	Bold Ruritana	5	Pat Day	James E. Day	Minshall Farms	1 mile	1:34.64	$86,325	Listed	
Capital Holding Mile Stakes
1994	Weekend Madness (IRE)	4	Charles R. Woods Jr.	Burk Kessinger Jr.	New Phoenix Stable	1 mile	1:38.58	$85,800	Listed	
1993	Lady Blessington (FR)	5	Pat Day	Mark A. Hennig	Team Valor Stable	1 mile	1:34.96	$57,800	Listed	
1992	Quilma (CHI)	5	Eddie Delahoussaye	D. Wayne Lukas	William S. Farish III et al.	1 mile	1:35.36	$58,900		
1991	Foresta	5	Angel Cordero Jr.	Thomas K. Bohannan	Loblolly Stable	1 mile	1:36.30	$59,800		
1990	Foresta	4	Angel Cordero Jr.	Thomas K. Bohannan	Loblolly Stable	1 mile	1:37.20	$55,700		
Twin Spires Stakes
1989	Classic Account	4	Pat Day	Terry L. Mason	Laura Leigh Stable	1 1/8 miles	1:51.20	$54,050		3YO & older
1988	Buoy	3	Pat Day	Joseph M. Bollero	Lois Bollero	1 1/16 miles	1:43.40	$56,500		3YOs only
1987	Fast Forward	3	Pat Day	D. Wayne Lukas	Eugene Klein	1 1/16 miles	1:43.20	$55,450		3YOs only
1984–1996		Race not held								
1983	† Le Cou Cou	3	Donald Lee Howard	James G. Arnett	Duane Clark	1 1/8 miles	1:49.60	$52,500		3YOs only

Legend:
Dirt Turf
Notes:
† In the 1983 inaugural running, High Honors was first past the post but was disqualified for interference in the straight and Le Cou Cou was declared the winner.

== See also ==
- List of American and Canadian Graded races
