= Stephanie's Kitten =

American-bred Thoroughbred racehorse

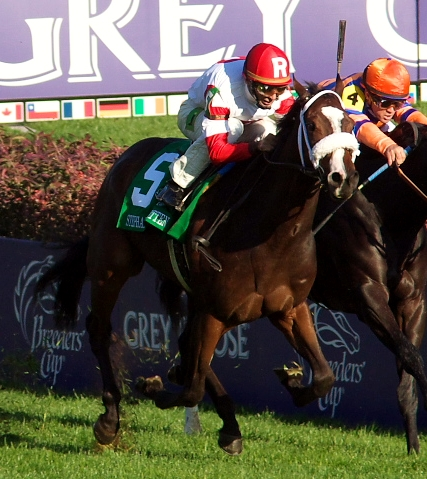
- Stephanie's Kitten at the 2011 Breeders' Cup.
- Sire: Kitten's Joy
- Grandsire: El Prado
- Dam: Unfold the Rose
- Damsire: Catienus
- Sex: Mare
- Foaled: March 26, 2009
- Country: United States
- Colour: Bay
- Breeder: Kenneth and Sarah Ramsey
- Owner: Kenneth and Sarah Ramsey
- Trainer: Wayne Catalano; Chad Brown
- Record: 26:11–4–4
- Earnings: $4,292,904

Major wins
- Alcibiades Stakes (2011); Breeders' Cup Juvenile Fillies Turf (2011); Edgewood Stakes (2012); Lake Placid Stakes (2012); Churchill Distaff Turf Mile Stakes (2013); Just A Game Stakes (2013); Flower Bowl Invitational Stakes (2014, 2015); Hillsborough Stakes (2015); Breeders' Cup Filly and Mare Turf (2015)
- Last updated on 17 October 2015

Stephanie's Kitten (foaled March 26, 2009) is an American Thoroughbred racehorse best known for winning two Breeders' Cup races. As a two-year-old in 2011 she won the Grade I Alcibiades Stakes and the Breeders' Cup Juvenile Fillies Turf. She won the Edgewood Stakes and the Lake Placid Stakes in 2012 and went on to win the Churchill Distaff Turf Mile Stakes and the Just A Game Stakes in 2013. As a five-year-old in 2014 she won the Flower Bowl Invitational Stakes and finished second in the Breeders' Cup Filly and Mare Turf. In 2015 she won the Hillsborough Stakes and a second Flower Bowl Invitational Stakes before ending her career with victory in the Breeders' Cup Filly and Mare Turf.

== Background ==
Stephanie's Kitten is a bay mare with a white blaze bred and owned by Kenneth and Sarah Ramsey. She was sired by the Ramsey stallion Kitten's Joy, the U.S. Champion Male Turf Horse of 2004. Her dam Unfold The Rose, also bred and owned by the Ramseys, was an unraced daughter of Catienus and the Del Mar Oaks winner Bail Out Becky. She was a descendant of the influential broodmare La Troienne. Stephanie's Kitten is named after the Ramseys' granddaughter.

The Ramseys sent their filly into training with Wayne Catalano before moving her to Chad Brown's stable in 2014.

== Racing career ==
=== 2011: two-year-old season ===
Stephanie's Kitten began her racing career at Arlington Park in the summer of 2011, finishing third on her debut and then winning a maiden race over one mile on the turf course on August 5. In September she was sent to Canada and stepped up in class to contest the Grade III Natalma Stakes at Woodbine Racetrack. Starting a 17/1 outsider she finished third behind Northern Passion and Dayatthespa. She returned to the United States to contest the Grade I Alcibiades Stakes on the synthetic Polytrack surface at Keeneland on October 7. Ridden by John Velazquez she started at odds of 9.8/1 and won by one and a half lengths after taking the lead inside the final furlong.

On her final appearance of the season Stephanie's Kitten was one of fourteen fillies to contest the Breeders' Cup Juvenile Fillies Turf at Churchill Downs on November 4. The British filly Elusive Kate started favorite ahead of Somali Lemonade (winner of the Jessamine Stakes) with Stephanie's Kitten third choice at odds of 8/1. The other contenders included Dayatthespa, Stopshoppingmaria (runner-up in the Frizette Stakes)and Pure Gossip (Miss Grillo Stakes) as well as Up from Ireland and Dear Lavinia from France. Velazquez tracked the leader Stopshoppingmaria before moving out to make a challenge in the straight. Stephanie's Kitten caught Stopshoppingmaria 25 yards from the finish and won by three quarters of a length. After the race, Velazquez said "She was amazing. As soon as I asked her to go in between those other two horses, she responded right away. It's nice when you can ride horses like that. It makes it easy for us. She's game for anything I ask her to do".

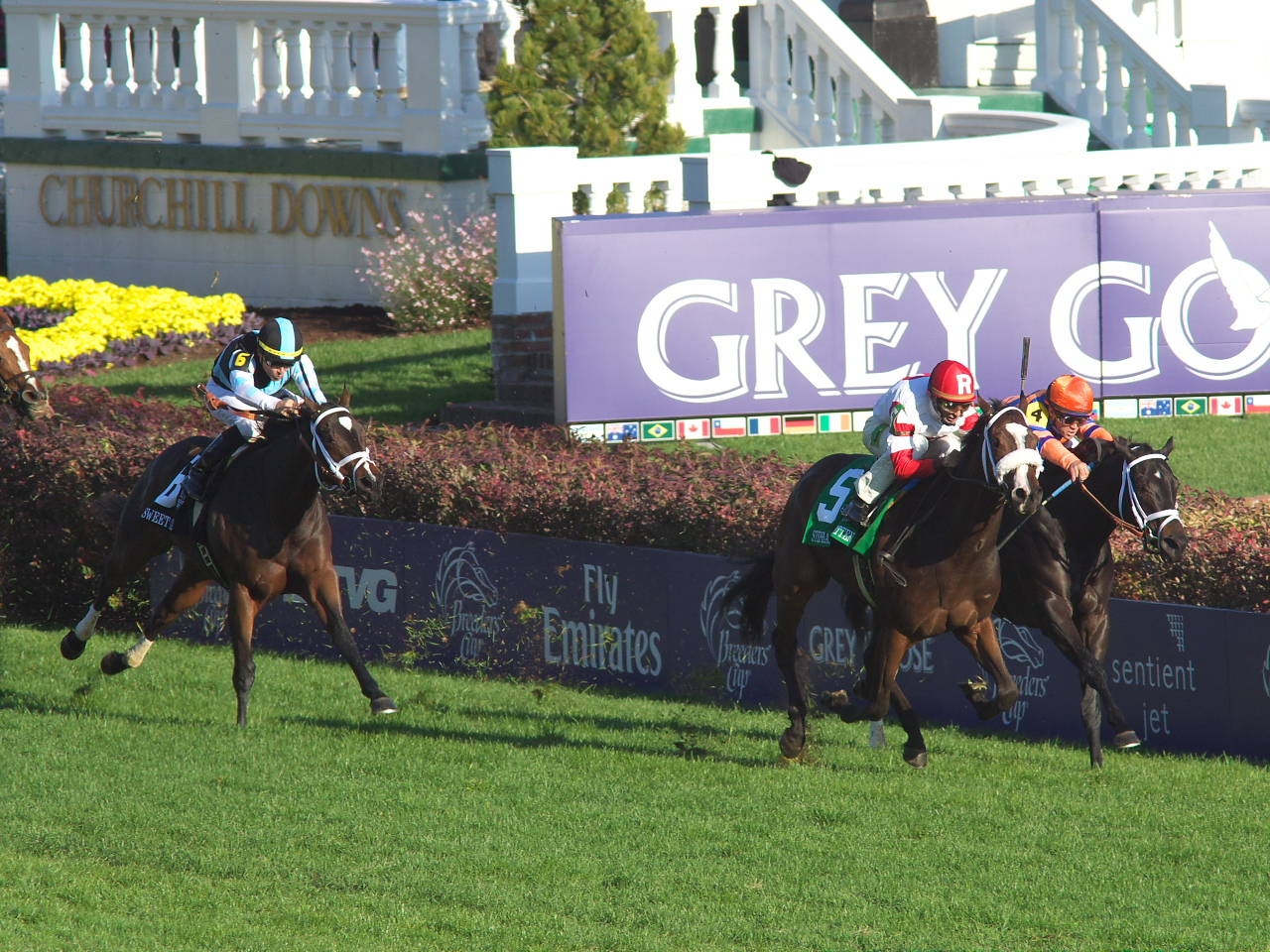
Stephanie's Kitten (#5) battles Stopshoppingmaria (#4) to win the 2011 Breeders' Cup Juvenile Fillies Turf.

=== 2012: three-year-old season ===
Stephanie's Kitten began her second season in the Grade I Ashland Stakes over eight and a half furlongs on the Polytrack at Keeneland on April 7. Ridden by Julien Leparoux she started favorite but finished third behind Karlovy Vary and Hard Not To Like. She returned to the turf at Churchill Downs on May 4 and won the Edgewood Stakes by two lengths from Firehouse Red, setting a race record time of 1:40.94.

After a two-month break she returned for two appearances at the summer meeting at Saratoga Race Course, starting with a fourth place behind Centre Court, Better Lucky and the British-trained Samitar in the Lake George Stakes on July 25. On August 19, Stephanie's Kitten faced Centre Court, Better Lucky and Somali Lemonade in the Grade II Lake Placid Stakes and was made the 11/10 favorite. After struggling to obtain a clear run in the straight she was switched out in the final furlong and finished strongly to win by half a length from Centre Court. Velazquez commented "I was on the rail the whole way... When I asked, she responded right away. It was a great effort by her and an incredible last eighth. I know she has it in her, and as soon as I pulled her out and hit her with the whip she responded right away, so I was very impressed at the way she did it".

On 13 October the filly started favorite for the Grade I Queen Elizabeth II Challenge Cup Stakes on the turf at Keeneland but finished sixth of the eight runners behind Dayatthespa, Centre Court, Better Lucky, Samitar and Somali Lemonade.

=== 2013: four-year-old season ===
On her debut as a four-year-old, Stephanie's Kitten contested the Churchill Distaff Turf Mile Stakes at Churchill Downs on May 4. She started third favorite behind Hungry Island (winner of the race in 2012) and Daisy Devine (Jenny Wiley Stakes) in a field which also included Karlovy Vary and Stopshoppingmaria. After racing in last place until the final turn, she was switched to the outside by Leparoux and produced a strong late run to catch Hungry Island inside the final furlong and win by a neck. On June 8 at Belmont Park the filly was stepped back up to Grade I level for the Just A Game Stakes over one mile. Her old rivals Centre Court, Hungry Island and Better Lucky were again in opposition as well as the outstanding sprinter Mizdirection and the French filly Laugh Out Loud (Prix de Sandringham). After being held up by Velazquez in the early stages, Stephanie's Kitten accelerated in the straight and got the better of a "sustained battle" with Better Lucky to win by half a length. Velazquez commented "It was do-or-die; you stay there or you die in there. She handled the ground great, that was the most important thing. When I asked her, she was there for me... I know she's a fighter, definitely". At Saratoga on July 27, started second favorite for the Grade I Diana Stakes but finished third of the five runners behind Laughing and Dream Peace.

=== 2014: five-year-old season ===
In 2014 Chad Brown took over from Catalano as Stephanie's Kitten's trainer. The mare made little impact on her first two starts, finishing eighth behind Hard Not To Like in the Jenny Wiley Stakes at Keeneland in April and fifth to Coffee Cliue when attempting to repeat her 2013 success in the Just A Game Stakes. In the Diana Stakes in July she finished strongly but was beaten neck into second place by Somali Lemonade. She faced Somali Lemonade again in the Beverly D. Stakes at Arlington in August, a race which also attracted the leading British fillies Just The Judge (Irish 1,000 Guineas) and Euro Charline. After being last of the eleven runners two furlongs out she finished very well but was beaten three quarters of a length into second place by Euro Charline.

The Grade I Flower Bowl Stakes at Belmont on September 27, saw Stephanie's Kitten, ridden by Velazquez, start 6/5 favorite against seven opponents. Her rivals included Abaco (Ballston Spa Handicap), the Brazilian mare Viva Rafaela, Alterite (Garden City Stakes) and Strathnaver (Bewitch Stakes). Velazquez positioned the favorite in mid-division as Viva Rafaela set the pace before making a challenge approaching the final furlong. Stephanie's Kitten took the lead and won by one and a quarter lengths and a neck from Abaco and Viva Rafaela. Velazquez commented "We broke well enough, and I wanted to make sure I got a nice position going into the first turn. Once we got that, I was pretty pleased with where I was and kind of bided my time. When I asked her, she responded right away, and made me look really good".

Stephanie's Kitten made her second appearance in the Breeder's Cup when she contested the Breeders' Cup Filly and Mare Turf at Santa Anita Park on November 1. She started the 4/1 second favorite behind Dank in a field which also included Dayatthespa, Secret Gesture (runner-up in The Oaks), Just The Judge and Fiesolana (Matron Stakes). After racing in mid-division, the mare finished strongly to take second place, one and a quarter lengths behind Dayatthespa.

Stephanie's Kitten was put up for auction at the Fasig-Tipton sale on November 3 but was bought back by Ken Ramsey when the bidding stopped at $3.95 million. Ramsey explained that he refused to sell her for less than $4 million saying that the mare was "kind of like one of the family".

=== 2015: six-year-old season ===
Stephanie's Kitten began her fifth season in the Grade III Hillsborough Stakes at Tampa Bay Downs on March 7 and won by one and a half lengths from Ball Dancing (also trained by Brown). After a three-month break she appeared in the New York Stakes at Belmont in June and finished fourth behind the Irish-trained filly Waltzing Matilda. In August she made her third attempt to win the Diana Stakes at Saratoga and started the 2.3/1 favorite. Ridden for the first time by Irad Ortiz she never looked likely to win and finished fifth behind Hard Not To Like, Tepin, Kitten's Queen and My Miss Sophia.

On August 15 at Arlington, Stephanie's Kitten started second favorite behind Euro Charline in what proved to be a highly controversial race for the Beverly D Stakes. After racing towards the rear of the field she made rapid progress in the straight and moved into second place behind Secret Gesture. In the last 100 yards she was impeded as the leader drifted right and finished third behind Secret Gesture and Watsdachances. After an inquiry she was promoted to second after Secret Gesture was disqualified. On October 3 Stephanie's Kitten attempted to repeat her 2014 success in the Flower Bowl Invitational Stakes and started second favorite behind the Irish-trained three-year-old Curvy, the winner of the Ribblesdale Stakes. Ortiz tracked the leaders before producing the mare with her customary late run: she took the lead inside the final furlong and won by one and a half lengths from Danza Cavallo. Mutatis Mutandis took third ahead of Watsdachances and Curvy.

Stephanie's Kitten ended her racing career in the Breeders' Cup Filly and Mare Turf at Keeneland on 31 October. The Irish filly Legatissimo was made the odds-on favorite ahead of the Chilean champion Dacita with Stephanie's Kitten third in the betting on 7.8/1. The other runners were Miss France, Queen's Jewel (Prix Saint-Alary), Secret Gesture, Watsdachances, Sentiero Italia (Sands Point Stakes), Photo Call (Rodeo Drive Stakes) and Sharla Rae (Del Mar Oaks). Stephanie's Kitten was restrained by Ortiz at the rear of the field as Secret Gesture set the pace. She began to make progress on the inside approaching the final turn and continued her charge in the straight, taking the lead inside the final furlong and winning by one and a quarter lengths from Legatissimo.

== Breeding career ==
Stephanie's Kitten was entered in the 2015 Fasig-Tipton November sale but was bought back by the Ramseys for $2.95 million after she failed to meet her $3 million reserve price. She was sold privately on November 2 for $2.8 million to Katsumi Yoshida's Northern Farm and exported to Japan. Ken Ramsey said of the sale, "I saw the sale was down last night and that only one horse in the sale brought $3 million, so I thought that was where the market is now and accepted the offer."

== Pedigree ==
Pedigree of Stephanie's Kitten (USA), bay mare, 2009
Sire Kitten's Joy (USA) 2001	El Prado (IRE); 1989	Sadler's Wells	Northern Dancer
Sire Kitten's Joy (USA) 2001	El Prado (IRE); 1989	Sadler's Wells	Fairy Bridge
Sire Kitten's Joy (USA) 2001	El Prado (IRE); 1989	Lady Capulet	Sir Ivor
Sire Kitten's Joy (USA) 2001	El Prado (IRE); 1989	Lady Capulet	Cap and Bells
Sire Kitten's Joy (USA) 2001	Kitten's First (USA); 1991	Lear Fan	Roberto
Sire Kitten's Joy (USA) 2001	Kitten's First (USA); 1991	Lear Fan	Wac
Sire Kitten's Joy (USA) 2001	Kitten's First (USA); 1991	That's My Hon	L'Enjoleur
Sire Kitten's Joy (USA) 2001	Kitten's First (USA); 1991	That's My Hon	One Lane
Dam Unfold the Rose (USA) 2004	Catienus (USA); 1994	Storm Cat	Storm Bird
Dam Unfold the Rose (USA) 2004	Catienus (USA); 1994	Storm Cat	Terlingua
Dam Unfold the Rose (USA) 2004	Catienus (USA); 1994	Diamond City	Mr. Prospector
Dam Unfold the Rose (USA) 2004	Catienus (USA); 1994	Diamond City	Honey's Flag
Dam Unfold the Rose (USA) 2004	Bail Out Becky (USA); 1992	Red Ransom	Roberto
Dam Unfold the Rose (USA) 2004	Bail Out Becky (USA); 1992	Red Ransom	Arabia
Dam Unfold the Rose (USA) 2004	Bail Out Becky (USA); 1992	Becky Be Good	Naskra
Dam Unfold the Rose (USA) 2004	Bail Out Becky (USA); 1992	Becky Be Good	Good Landing (Family: 1-x)

- Stephanie's Kitten is inbred 4 × 4 to Roberto, meaning that this stallion appears twice in the fourth generation of her pedigree.
