= Dreaming of Anna =

American-bred Thoroughbred racehorse

- Sire: Rahy
- Grandsire: Blushing Groom
- Dam: Justenuffheart
- Damsire: Broad Brush
- Sex: Mare
- Foaled: February 5, 2004
- Died: January 9, 2018
- Country: United States
- Colour: Chestnut
- Breeder: Frank C. Calabrese
- Owner: Frank C. Calabrese
- Trainer: Wayne M. Catalano
- Record: 17: 10–3–1
- Earnings: $2,024,550

Major wins
- Tippett Stakes (2006); Summer Stakes (2006); Virginia Oaks (2007); Double Delta Stakes (2007); Pucker Up Stakes (2007); Endeavour Breeders' Cup Stakes (2008); Hillsborough Stakes (2008); Mint Julep Handicap (2008) Breeders' Cup wins: Breeders' Cup Juvenile Fillies (2006)

Awards
- U.S. Champion 2-Yr-Old Filly (2006)
- Last updated on January 15, 2018

Dreaming of Anna (February 5, 2004 – January 9, 2018) was an American thoroughbred racehorse.

== Background ==
She was sired by the outstanding English and American stud, Rahy out of the Broad Brush mare, Justenuffheart, who was a multi-graded stakes race winner and half-sister to Grade I Turf winner Kitten's Joy. Although there is no Northern Dancer nor Mr. Prospector in her bloodline, she traces back to the great Nearco through several lines. Bred by Frank C. Calabrese, she was named for his deceased sister, Anna Anderson, who died of cancer at age 48.

Dreaming of Anna is a full sister to owner Frank Calabrese's graded stakes race winner, Lewis Michael, winner of the 2007 Grade II Washington Park Handicap.

== Racing career ==
Trained by Wayne Catelano, Dreaming of Anna was undefeated as a two-year-old, winning a maiden race, the Tippett Stakes, and then the Grade III Summer Stakes at Woodbine, beating colts in a near-record time on turf, before winning the 2006 Breeders' Cup Juvenile Fillies wire to wire win over Octave. She was named U.S. Champion 2-Yr-Old Filly for 2006.

Dreaming of Anna was wintered at Palm Meadows Thoroughbred Training Center in Florida. Her 2007 began with a third in the Grade III Old Hat Stakes in February at Gulfstream Park and a second in the Gaily Gaily Stakes on turf. With regular jockey René Douglas in the saddle, she seemed to tire in the stretch in the Kentucky Oaks and placed 6th to Rags to Riches. Returned to the turf, she won the Double Delta Stakes at Arlington Park and the Virginia Oaks at Colonial Downs gate to wire. In September, she won the Grade III Pucker Up Stakes back at Arlington, a 1 1/8 miles (1.8 km) race on turf, with a 4 1/4-length victory in 1:48.20, just off the stake record. On October 13, 2007, Dreaming of Anna was beaten by a little over 2 lengths by Bit of Whimsy in the Grade I Queen Elizabeth II Challenge Cup Stakes at Keeneland Race Course after leading most of the way.

Dreaming of Anna made her 2008 racing debut at Tampa Bay Downs with a win in the Endeavour Breeders' Cup Stakes. On March 15, she won the Grade IIIT Hillsborough Stakes against Lear's Princess. On Saturday, May 3, longshot Bit of Whimsy ran down favorite Dreaming of Anna in the stretch to win by 2 1/4 lengths with Dreaming of Anna placing second. On June 14, Dreaming of Anna and Garrett Gomez won the Early Times Mint Julep Hanidcap.

== Retirement and stud ==
Dreaming of Anna was retired from racing in October 2008 and was shipped to Three Chimneys Farm, where she was to be bred to Street Cry.

She died of a ruptured aorta on January 9, 2018, at Woodspring Farm in Versailles, Kentucky.

== Pedigree ==
Pedigree of Dreaming of Anna, chestnut mare, foaled February 5, 2004
Sire Rahy chestnut 1985	Blushing Groom ch. 1974	Red God ch. 1954	Nasrullah
Sire Rahy chestnut 1985	Blushing Groom ch. 1974	Red God ch. 1954	Spring Run
Sire Rahy chestnut 1985	Blushing Groom ch. 1974	Runaway Bride b. 1962	Wild Risk
Sire Rahy chestnut 1985	Blushing Groom ch. 1974	Runaway Bride b. 1962	Aimee
Sire Rahy chestnut 1985	Glorious Song b. 1976	Halo blk. 1969	Hail To Reason
Sire Rahy chestnut 1985	Glorious Song b. 1976	Halo blk. 1969	Cosmah
Sire Rahy chestnut 1985	Glorious Song b. 1976	Ballade dkb/br. 1972	Herbager
Sire Rahy chestnut 1985	Glorious Song b. 1976	Ballade dkb/br. 1972	Miss Swapsco
Dam Justenuffheart bay 1995	Broad Brush b. 1983	Ack Ack b. 1966	Battle Joined
Dam Justenuffheart bay 1995	Broad Brush b. 1983	Ack Ack b. 1966	Fast Turn
Dam Justenuffheart bay 1995	Broad Brush b. 1983	Hay Patcher b. 1973	Hoist The Flag
Dam Justenuffheart bay 1995	Broad Brush b. 1983	Hay Patcher b. 1973	Turn to Talent
Dam Justenuffheart bay 1995	Kitten's First b. 1991	Lear Fan b. 1981	Roberto
Dam Justenuffheart bay 1995	Kitten's First b. 1991	Lear Fan b. 1981	Wac
Dam Justenuffheart bay 1995	Kitten's First b. 1991	That's My Hon ch. 1983	L'Enjoleur
Dam Justenuffheart bay 1995	Kitten's First b. 1991	That's My Hon ch. 1983	One Lane (Family 2-d)
