= Endeavour Stakes =

- Class: Grade III
- Location: Tampa Bay Downs; Oldsmar, Florida
- Inaugurated: 2000
- Race type: Thoroughbred – Flat racing

Race information
- Distance: 1 1/16 miles
- Surface: Turf
- Track: Left-handed
- Qualification: Fillies & Mares, four years old and older
- Weight: 124 lbs with allowances
- Purse: $150,000 (since 2012)

The Endeavour Stakes is a Grade III American Thoroughbred horse race for fillies and mares that are four years old or older, over a distance of 1 1/16 miles on turf, held annually in February at Tampa Bay Downs racetrack in Oldsmar, Florida.

== History ==
The event was inaugurated on 4 January 2000 at a distance of about 1 1/8 miles and was won by Office Miss by the shortest of margins, a nose over Seducer in a time of 1:48.93.

In 2004 the event was decreased to its present 1 1/16 miles.

The event was upgraded to Grade III status in 2008. That year's winner, Dreaming of Anna, was the 2006 Eclipse Award Juvenile Filly champion. The 2012 Endeavour winner, Zagora, went on to win the Breeders' Cup Filly and Mare Turf and the Eclipse Award in that category. The 2016 winner Tepin was named US Champion Grass Mare in both 2015 and 2016 and won the 2015 Breeders' Cup Mile.

== Records ==
Speed record:

- 1 1/16 miles: 1:39.92 – Saffron Moon (2025)
- about 1 1/8 miles: 1:48:48 – Cybil (2001)

Margins:

- 4 lengths – Dona Bruja (ARG) (2018)

Most wins:

- No horse has won this race more than once.

Most wins by an owner:

- 2 – Lael Stable (2019, 2020)

Most wins by a jockey:

- 3 – John R. Velazquez (2007, 2017, 2021)

Most wins by a trainer:

- 5 – Chad C. Brown (2012, 2016, 2021, 2022, 2025)

== Winners ==
Year	Winner	Age	Jockey	Trainer	Owner	Distance	Time	Purse	Grade	Ref
2026	Aussie Girl (IRE)	5	Ben Curtis	WIlliam Walden	Woodford Thoroughbreds	1 1/16 miles	1:42.62	$150,000	III	
2025	Saffron Moon	5	Flavien Prat	Chad C. Brown	CHP Racing	1 1/16 miles	1:39.92	$150,000	III	
2024	Walkathon	5	Antonio Gallardo	Ian R. Wilkes	Whitham Thoroughbreds	1 1/16 miles	1:41.00	$150,000	III	
2023	Surprisingly	4	Paco Lopez	Claude R. McGaughey III	Phipps Stable	1 1/16 miles	1:40.08	$150,000	III	
2022	Bleecker Street	4	Hector R. Diaz Jr.	Chad C. Brown	Peter M. Brant	1 1/16 miles	1:41.91	$150,000	III	
2021	Counterparty Risk (IRE)	4	John R. Velazquez	Chad C. Brown	Klaravich Stables	1 1/16 miles	1:43.20	$150,000	III	
2020	Jehozacat	5	Daniel Centeno	Arnaud Delacour	Lael Stables	1 1/16 miles	1:42.44	$150,000	III	
2019	Hawksmoor (IRE)	6	Javier Castellano	Arnaud Delacour	Lael Stables	1 1/16 miles	1:40.83	$150,000	III	
2018	Dona Bruja (ARG)	6	Jose L. Ortiz	Ignacio Correas IV	Dom Felipe	1 1/16 miles	1:40.92	$150,000	III	
2017	Isabella Sings	5	John R. Velazquez	Todd A. Pletcher	Siena Farm	1 1/16 miles	1:41.07	$150,000	III	
2016	Tepin	5	Julien R. Leparoux	Mark E. Casse	Robert E. Masterson	1 1/16 miles	1:42.91	$150,000	III	
2015	Testa Rossi (FR)	4	Irad Ortiz Jr.	Chad C. Brown	James Covello, Thomas Coleman & Doheny Racing Stable	1 1/16 miles	1:42.04	$150,000	III	
2014	Cloud Scapes	5	Erick D. Rodriguez	H. Graham Motion	Pin Oak Stud	1 1/16 miles	1:42.75	$150,000	III	
2013	Old Tune (BRZ)	5	Joel Rosario	Todd A. Pletcher	Stud TNT	1 1/16 miles	1:41.48	$150,000	III	
2012	Zagora (FR)	5	Javier Castellano	Chad C. Brown	Martin S. Schwartz	1 1/16 miles	1:40.92	$150,000	III	
2011	Silver Reunion	5	Ramon A. Dominguez	H. Graham Motion	Brereton C. Jones	1 1/16 miles	1:43.98	$125,000	III	
2010	Lomaki	6	Christopher P. DeCarlo	Eric Coatrieux	Chiefswood Stable	1 1/16 miles	1:46.39	$125,000	III	
2009	Ballymore Lady	6	Jose Lezcano	Eddie Kenneally	Ron McCauley & Colin Purcell	1 1/16 miles	1:42.37	$125,000	III	
2008	Dreaming of Anna	4	Cornelio Velasquez	Wayne M. Catalano	Frank C. Calabrese	1 1/16 miles	1:42.38	$147,500	III	
2007	Cassydora (GB)	5	John R. Velazquez	Todd A. Pletcher	Green Hills Farm	1 1/16 miles	1:43.05	$108,750	Listed	
2006	My Lordship	5	Cornelio Velasquez	William I. Mott	Live Oak Plantation	1 1/16 miles	1:40.26	$120,500	Listed	
2005	Delta Princess	6	Heberto Castillo Jr.	William I. Mott	Saud bin Khaled	1 1/16 miles	1:43.54	$100,000	Listed	
2004	Madeira Mist (IRE)	5	Edgar S. Prado	Christophe Clement	Skymarc Farm	1 1/16 miles	1:44.97	$100,000	Listed	
2003	Wander Mom	5	Manoel R. Cruz	Edward Plesa Jr.	Jamie S. Carrion	abt. 1 1/8 miles	1:50.89	$75,000	Listed	
2002	Chausson Poire	4	Thomas L. Pompell	Duane Knipe	Pia M. Kirkham	abt. 1 1/8 miles	1:50.40	$75,000	Listed	
2001	Cybil	5	Felix L. Ortiz	Joseph J. Graci III	Carol F. Dooner	abt. 1 1/8 miles	1:48.48	$75,000	Listed	
2000	Office Miss	6	Joe Bravo	Gary Sciacca	Sam F. Morell	abt. 1 1/8 miles	1:48.93	$75,000	Listed	

== See also ==
- List of American and Canadian Graded races
