= Tepin (horse) =

American Thoroughbred racehorse (2011–2023)

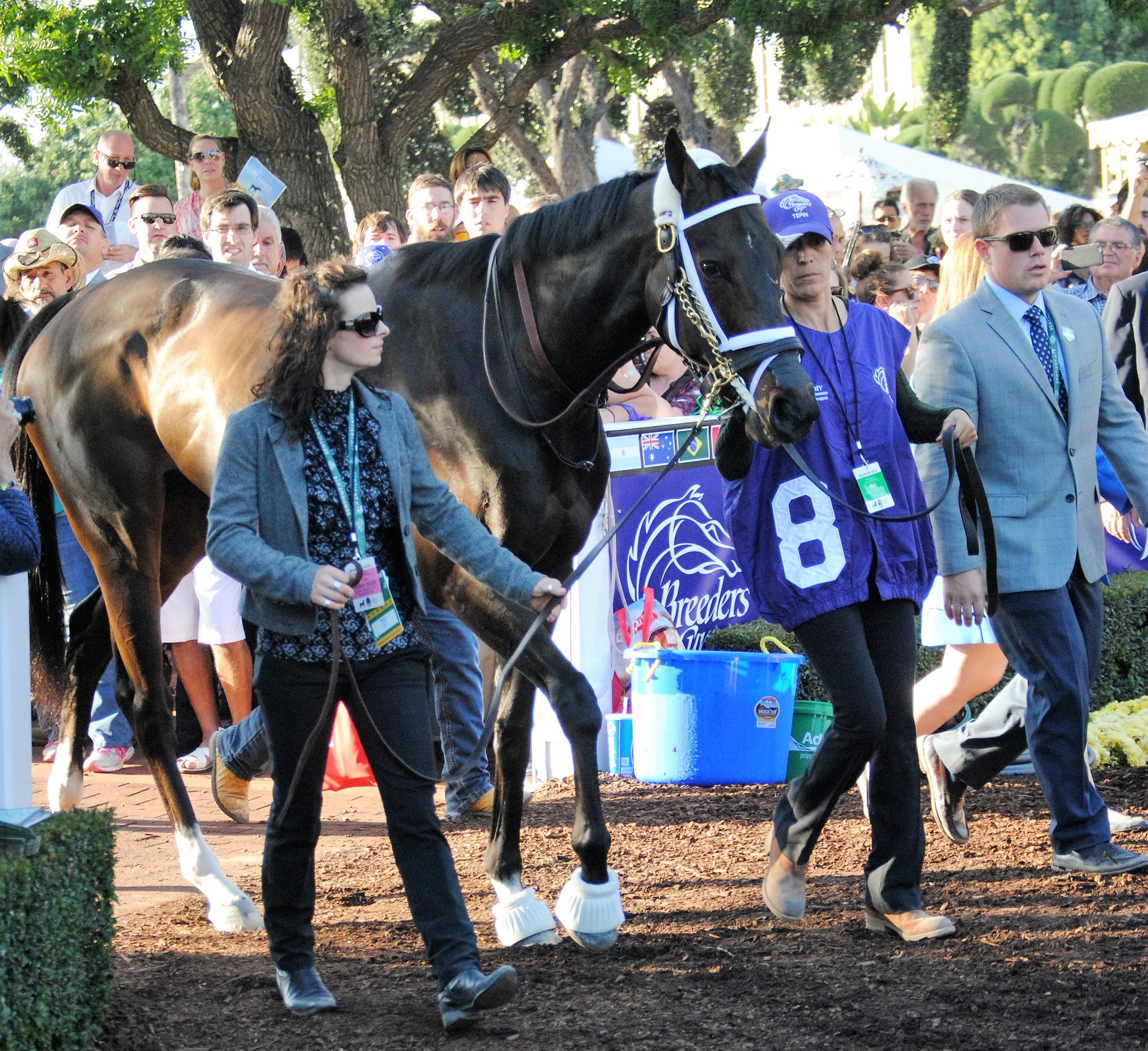
- Tepin at the 2016 Breeders' Cup
- Sire: Bernstein
- Grandsire: Storm Cat
- Dam: Life Happened
- Damsire: Stravinsky
- Sex: Mare
- Foaled: March 14, 2011
- Died: 2023 (aged 12)
- Country: United States
- Colour: Bay
- Breeder: Machmer Hall
- Owner: Robert E. Masterson
- Trainer: Mark E. Casse
- Record: 23: 13-5-1
- Earnings: $4,437,918

Major wins
- Delta Princess Stakes (2013); Churchill Distaff Turf Mile Stakes (2015, 2016); Just a Game Stakes (2015); First Lady Stakes (2015); Endeavour Stakes (2016); Hillsborough Stakes (2016); Jenny Wiley Stakes (2016); Queen Anne Stakes (2016); Woodbine Mile (2016); Breeders' Cup wins: Breeders' Cup Mile (2015)

Awards
- American Champion Female Turf Horse (2015, 2016)

Honours
- Canadian Horse Racing Hall of Fame (2020); American Horse Racing Hall of Fame (2022); Tepin Stakes at Aqueduct (2018– ) Tepin Stakes at Churchill Downs (2020– )
- Last updated on 6 August 2022

Tepin (March 14, 2011 – 2023) was an American Thoroughbred racehorse who was named the American Champion Female Turf Horse of 2015 and 2016. She showed very promising form as a two-year-old in 2013 when she won the Delta Princess Stakes on the dirt. After a disappointing three-year-old season when she failed to win in four starts, she emerged as a top-class turf performer in 2015. Her wins as a four-year-old included the Churchill Distaff Turf Mile Stakes, Just a Game Stakes and First Lady Stakes before recording her biggest success when defeating male opposition in the Breeders' Cup Mile. In 2016, she won her first four starts and was then sent to England, where she defeated a field of leading European milers to win the Queen Anne Stakes. On returning to North America, she extended her winning streak to eight in the Woodbine Mile. The streak included three Grade/Group 1 wins against male horses in three different countries. Although Tepin finished second in her next two starts including an effort to defend her title in the Breeders Cup Mile, she was still named the Champion Female Turf Horse for the second year in a row. Tepin was inducted to the Canadian Horse Racing Hall of Fame in 2020 and the US National Museum of Racing and Hall of Fame in 2022.

== Background ==
Tepin was a bay mare with three white socks and a small white star who was bred in Kentucky by Machmer Hall. She was sired by the sprinter Bernstein, who won the Railway Stakes and the Concorde Stakes when trained in Ireland by Aidan O'Brien. His most notable other progeny has been Karakontie, who won the Breeders' Cup Mile in 2014. Her dam Life Happened was an unraced daughter of another O'Brien sprinter Stravinsky: before foaling Tepin she had produced the colt Vyjack, whose wins included the Jerome Stakes and the Kelso Handicap. She was descended from the mare Omayya, who was the ancestor of many important winners including the Melbourne Cup winner Americain and the Irish Oaks winner Melodist.

As a yearling Tepin was consigned to the Fasig-Tipton sale at Saratoga in August and was bought for $140,000 by Robert E. Masterson. She was sent into training with Mark E. Casse, who was inducted into the Canadian Horse Racing Hall Of Fame in 2016. As Casse was based at Woodbine in Canada and Tepin was based in the U.S., much of her day-to-day training was handled by his son, Norman Casse.

Tepin was named for the street on which Masterson lives, not the pepper. Her nickname was the "Queen of the Turf".

== Racing career ==
=== 2013: two-year-old season ===
Tepin began her racing career by finishing fourth in a six furlong maiden race on the dirt at Churchill Downs on September 7, 2013. In October she contested a maiden over seven furlongs on the synthetic track at Keeneland and recorded her first victory, taking the lead in the stretch and coming home three and a quarter lengths clear of Adellusion. Later that month she returned to Churchill Downs and finished third to Clever Beauty in the one-mile Rags To Riches Stakes. On November 23 she was moved up on class for the Grade III Princess Stakes over one mile on a fast dirt track at Delta Downs in which her opponents included the Sorrento Stakes winner Concave and the Matron Stakes winner Miss Behaviour. Ridden by Miguel Mena, she raced in fourth place before producing a sustained run in the straight. She took the lead in the closing stages and won by one and a quarter lengths from Bahnah with a gap of more than five lengths back to Concave in third place. The Blood-Horse's correspondent described the result as a "mild surprise".

=== 2014: three-year-old season ===
Tepin made very little impact on her first two starts of 2014, finishing unplaced in the Miss Preakness Stakes on dirt at Pimlico Race Course in May and the Regret Stakes on turf at Churchill Downs in June. Stewart Elliott took over from Mena when the filly contested the Grade II San Clemente Handicap over one mile on turf at Del Mar Racetrack on July 20. Starting as an 18.3/1 longshot, she made steady progress in the straight to finish second, two and a half lengths behind the winner Istanford. On her only other appearance of the season, the filly finished last in the Grade I Del Mar Oaks on August 17.

=== 2015: four-year-old season ===
In 2015, Julien Leparoux took over as Tepin's regular jockey and rode her in all of her races. She began her third season at Gulfstream Park in March, winning an allowance race over eight and a half furlongs to record her first success in almost sixteen months. She was then moved up in class for the Grade II Churchill Distaff Turf Mile Stakes on May 2 and started the 9.1/1 fourth choice in the betting behind Coffee Clique (Just a Game Stakes), Lady Lara (Honey Fox Stakes) and Sandiva (Suwannee River Stakes). Tepin led from the start and repelled several challenges to win by a length and a half from Coffee Clique, with Sandiva three lengths back in third. Casse explained that the filly had been suited by making the running at a steady pace and Leparoux concurred before adding "I really like the filly and was confident today".

Another step up in grade saw the filly contesting the Grade I Just A Game Stakes at Belmont Park and starting third favorite behind Ball Dancing (Jenny Wiley Stakes) and Coffee Clique. Her other rivals on this occasion included Discreet Marq (2013 Del Mar Oaks), Filimbi (Goldikova Stakes), J Wonder (Fred Darling Stakes), Sandiva and Lady Lara. After tracking the leaders, Leparoux switched Tepin to the outside in the straight. She accelerated past Discreet Marq and held off the late-running Filimbi to win by half a length. After Tepin's first win at the highest level Leparoux commented "She's got a big heart. Every time I asked her, she was going and she fought to the end. She kept digging and digging". Tepin failed to add to her winning tally in her next two starts but ran well in defeat on both occasions. At Saratoga Race Course on July 25 she was beaten a nose by the Canadian mare Hard Not To Like in the nine furlong Diana Stakes with Stephanie's Kitten in fifth. In the Ballston Spa Handicap at the same track in August, she started favorite and led for most of the way before being caught on the wire and beaten a head by the Chilean import Dacita.

Tepin began her autumn campaign at Keeneland on October 2 when she was one of eleven fillies and mares to contest the Grade I First Lady Stakes over one mile on turf. She was favored at 1.7/1 against rivals including My Miss Sophia (2014 Gazelle Stakes) and a strong European contingent comprising Outstanding and Easter from the Irish stable of Aidan O'Brien and Crowley's Law from England. After tracking the outsider Cara Marie, Tepin went to the front a furlong out and accelerated away from the field to win "easily" by seven lengths from Crowley's Law. After the race Casse said "She was fired up today; she went a little wild in the paddock and stepped on my toe. But I told Julien when I put him up, 'She's on her game.' She was impressive. We'll probably go to the Breeders' Cup Mile".

As Casse had indicated, Tepin's next race was the Breeders' Cup Mile at Keeneland on October 31, a race which had not been won by a North American female racehorse since the ex-English Royal Heroine took the inaugural running in 1984. The race appeared to be dominated by the French entry which comprised Make Believe (the 2.7/1 favorite), Esoterique, Karakontie and Impassable (Prix Daniel Wildenstein), while Britain was represented by Time Test (Tercentenary Stakes, Joel Stakes) and Mondialiste (Woodbine Mile). Tepin at 7/1 was the only North American runner to start at odds of less than 25/1. Tepin broke first out of the gate before racing in second place as the outsider Obviously set a steady pace before accelerating into the lead approaching the final furlong. She quickly went clear of the field and won by two and a half lengths from Mondialiste with the American-trained outsiders Grand Arch and Mshawish taking third and fourth. After the race Casse referenced previous female winners of the race saying, "To be in the same company with Goldikova, Miesque, and Royal Heroine, beating the boys in the Mile, I'm not sure I have the words. Am I dreaming? She just continues to amaze me". Owner Robert Materson said, "I told everyone that she was the best filly in the country and she proved it today".

=== 2016: five-year-old season ===
At the Eclipse Awards in January 2016 Tepin was named American Champion Female Turf Horse after taking 211 of the 261 votes.

On February 13, 2016, Tepin made her first appearance since Breeders Cup in the Endeavour Stakes at Tampa Bay Downs and won by three and a half lengths from Lady Lara. A month later at the same track she added a win the Hillsborough Stakes, beating Isabella Sings by a length. She returned to Grade I company on April 16 in the Jenny Wiley Stakes at Keeneland Racecourse and started the 2/5 favourite against eight opponents. After tracking the leaders Leparoux sent Tepin into the lead in the straight and the mare drew away to win by five lengths in a race record time of 1:40.53.

In June the mare was sent to England to contest the Group One Queen Anne Stakes over the straight mile course at Royal Ascot. European rule meant that she was not allowed her raceday Lasix medication and was not permitted to be equipped with her usual breathing strip. She faced several of the best European mile performers including Belardo, Esoterique, Toormore, Amazing Maria and Ervedya. Starting at odds of 11/2 Tepin raced prominently on the stands side, before taking the lead in the last quarter mile and held off the sustained challenge of Belardo to win by half a length. In doing so, she became the first horse based outside of Europe to take the Queen Anne. "We didn’t expect to win," said Masterson. "We took her [overseas] because we thought it was the right thing to do. She’d done everything she could do in the United States. We actually wanted to show her off in England, because they were kind enough to invite us over there."

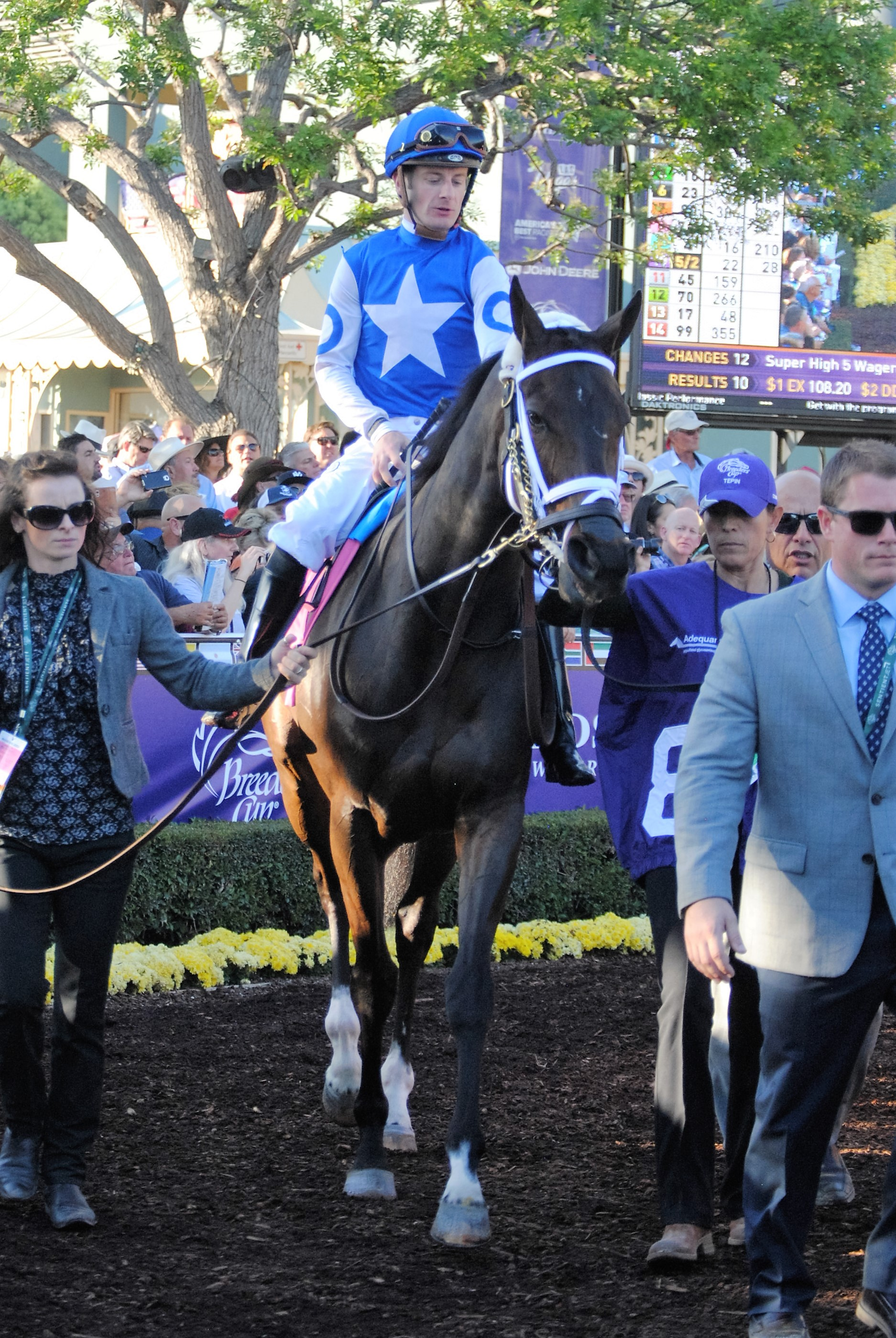
Tepin at the 2016 Breeders' Cup

On returning to North America, Casse considered entering the mare in the Fourstardave at Saratoga in August but was concerned when she had a few "blah days". Instead, he entered her in the Grade I Woodbine Mile on September 17. Casse wound up missing the race at Woodbine, his home track, as he had been attending the Keeneland Sales and his flight to Toronto was grounded. Off a layoff of nearly three months, Tepin was not at her sharpest but hit the lead in mid-stretch then held off late challenges by Tower of Texas and Mutakayyef to win by half a length. It was her eighth consecutive win, including three Group/Grade 1 wins against males in three different countries. As she approached the winner's circle, the crowd started chanting her name. "Even my people at Woodbine said 'We've never had anything like this before, we've never been around this," said Casse, watching the race in Kentucky. "I wish I could have been there to hear [the chants]. We're just so proud of her."

Tepin next entered the First Lady Stakes at Keeneland on October 8 as the heavy favorite. Photo Call unexpectedly went to the front and opened up a lead of 10 lengths while setting moderate fractions. Tepin unleashed a closing kick down the stretch but fell short by 2 3/4 lengths. "We hoped for the best, but this is why we picked this race in particular," said Norman Casse. "We didn't really want to run her 'A' race today. The goal has always been the Breeders' Cup Mile, a repeat there. I haven't lost any confidence in her, I think we are still set up to do that and she'll move forward from this race."

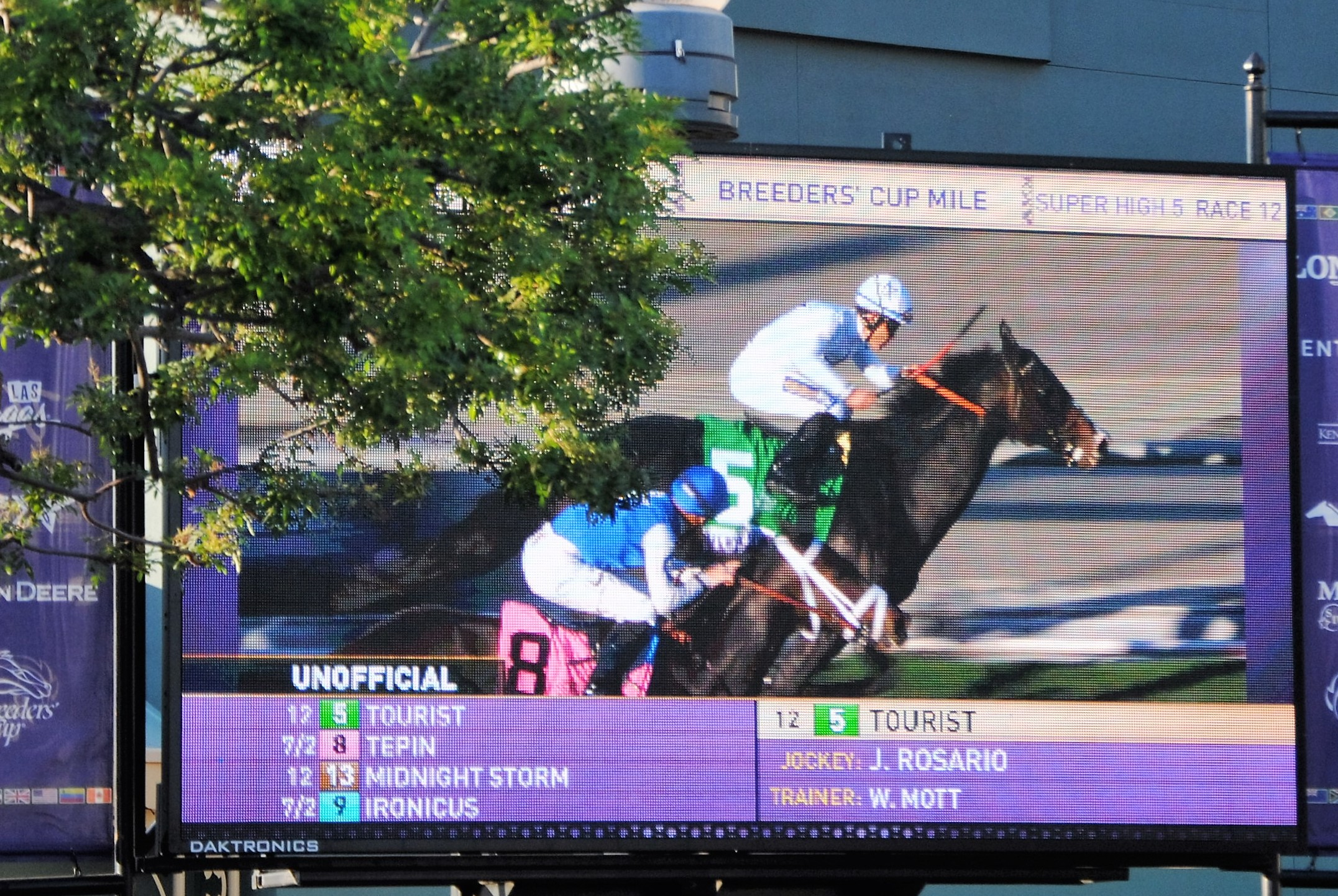
Photo finish of the 2016 Breeders' Cup Mile

Although Tepin remained the top ranked turf mare in the United States, some feared she had passed her prime. In the Breeders' Cup Mile, she faced an excellent field led by Limato (July Cup, Prix de la Forêt) and Alice Springs (Falmouth, Matron, Sun Chariot). Behind a rapid early pace, Tepin settled into seventh position on the outside just behind Limato. In front of them was Tourist, who kicked for home first and sailed up the rail to the lead. Four wide around the final turn, Tepin made a late charge but missed by half a length. The time for the race was 1:31.71 – the fastest Breeders' Cup Mile ever run and just off the Santa Anita course record of 1:31.69. "We had a good race", said Leparoux. "I was right behind the favorite and was in a good spot. She made a run but the winner got a dream trip on the inside. What else can you say about her? She had an incredible year. We were hoping she would end the year with a win but it's been a pleasure to ride her."

"You know, Norman came up and said 'Dad, what a hell of a year it's been,'" said Casse. "I'm just so proud of everybody and I'm so proud of Tepin. She ran a hell of a race and ... as long as she's happy and healthy, she could run some more."

Tepin was again named the American Champion Female Turf Horse in the 2016 Eclipse Award balloting.

== Retirement ==
Tepin was originally scheduled to race in 2017 but experienced a mild bout of colic before her planned debut in the Endeavour Stakes and missed the race. She soon resumed training but uncharacteristically refused to break into a gallop in a scheduled workout on March 27. On April 18, Casse announced that Tepin would be retired. "We just think she doesn't want to do it anymore. She's happy and healthy," he said. "She just doesn't have the same desire to train and we said all along if she showed that to us we would listen. We've given her the opportunity, we took her to Churchill which definitely made her happy but she still... it's just time."

At the 2017 Fasig-Tipton sale, she was sold in foal for $8 million to Coolmore Stud, who announced their plan to breed her to Galileo in future. Tepin produced her first foal, a filly by Curlin, on May 1, 2018.

On October 5, 2024, it was revealed that Tepin died in 2023. She was 12.

=== Progeny ===
- 2018 Tepin Thru Life by Curlin – Did not race
- 2019 Swirl by Galileo – Did not race
- 2021 Grateful by Galileo – Winner of the Prix de Royallieu
- 2022 Delacroix by Dubawi – Winner of the Autumn Stakes, Eclipse Stakes and Irish Champion Stakes

== Pedigree ==
Pedigree of Tepin (USA), bay mare, 2011
Sire Bernstein (USA) 1997	Storm Cat (USA); 1983	Storm Bird	Northern Dancer
Sire Bernstein (USA) 1997	Storm Cat (USA); 1983	Storm Bird	South Ocean
Sire Bernstein (USA) 1997	Storm Cat (USA); 1983	Terlingua	Secretariat
Sire Bernstein (USA) 1997	Storm Cat (USA); 1983	Terlingua	Crimson Saint
Sire Bernstein (USA) 1997	La Affirmed (USA); 1983	Affirmed	Exclusive Native
Sire Bernstein (USA) 1997	La Affirmed (USA); 1983	Affirmed	Won't Tell You
Sire Bernstein (USA) 1997	La Affirmed (USA); 1983	La Mesa	Round Table
Sire Bernstein (USA) 1997	La Affirmed (USA); 1983	La Mesa	Finance
Dam Life Happened (USA) 2001	Stravinsky (USA); 1996	Nureyev	Northern Dancer
Dam Life Happened (USA) 2001	Stravinsky (USA); 1996	Nureyev	Special
Dam Life Happened (USA) 2001	Stravinsky (USA); 1996	Fire the Groom	Blushing Groom
Dam Life Happened (USA) 2001	Stravinsky (USA); 1996	Fire the Groom	Propector's Fire
Dam Life Happened (USA) 2001	Round It Off (USA); 1990	Apalachee	Round Table
Dam Life Happened (USA) 2001	Round It Off (USA); 1990	Apalachee	Moccasin
Dam Life Happened (USA) 2001	Round It Off (USA); 1990	Capp It Off	Double Zeus
Dam Life Happened (USA) 2001	Round It Off (USA); 1990	Capp It Off	Turn Capp (Family: 1-n)

- Tepin is inbred 4 × 4 to Northern Dancer and Round Table, meaning that both these stallions appear twice in the fourth generation of her pedigree.
