= Martin S. Schwartz =

American investor (born 1945)

Personal information
- Born: March 23, 1945 (age 81)
- Occupation: Trader

Horse racing career
- Sport: Horse racing
- Career wins: ongoing

Major racing wins
- Discovery Handicap (2002); Meadowlands Cup (2003); Coronation Stakes (2005); Beverly D. Stakes (2005, 2006, 2011, 2016); Bewitch Stakes (2005, 2016); Just A Game (2006); Appalachian Stakes (2006); Regret Stakes (2006); First Lady Stakes (2006); Spinster Stakes (2006); San Gorgonio Handicap (2007); Buena Vista Handicap (2007); Santa Ana Handicap (2007); Doubledogdare Stakes (2007); Oujia Board Handicap (2007); Cash Call Mile (2007); Prix Imprudence (2009); Poule d'Essai des Pouliches (2009); Prix de Diane (2009); Prix Vermeille (2009); Prix Vanteaux (2010); La Coupe (2010); Prix de Psyché (2010, 2017); Prix Jean Romanet (2010); Prix Quincey (2010); Diana Stakes (2011); Flower Bowl Invitational Handicap (2011); Endeavour Stakes (2012); Hillsborough Stakes (2012); Gallorette Handicap (2012); Ballston Spa Handicap (2012); Garden City Handicap (2012, 2013); Pilgrim Stakes (2012); American Turf Stakes (2013); Beaugay Stakes (2014); Prix de Malleret (2015); The Very One Stakes (2016); Sheepshead Bay Stakes (2016, 2017); Barbara Fritchie Handicap (2017); Matchmaker Stakes (2017); Noble Damsel Handicap (2017); Athenia Stakes (2017); Matriarch Stakes (2017); Prix Marcel Boussac (2018); Prix Cléopâtre (2019) French Classic Race wins: Poule d'Essai des Pouliches (2009); Prix de Diane (2009) Irish Classic Race wins: Irish 1000 Guineas (2012) Breeders Cup wins: Breeders' Cup Filly & Mare Turf (2012)

Significant horses
- Gorella, Asi Siempre, Angara, Lady of Venice, Bowman's Band, Maids Causeway, Off Limits, Samitar, Stacelita, Elusive Wave, Sea Calisi, Silver Cup, Zagora, Lily's Candle

Martin S. Schwartz (Buzzy, born March 23, 1945) is a Wall Street trader who made his fortune successfully trading stocks, futures and options. He received national attention when he won the U.S. Investing Championship in 1984. Schwartz is the author of Pit Bull: Lessons from Wall Street's Champion Day Trader.

== Education ==
Graduated with a degree from Amherst College in 1967 and Received an MBA from Columbia University in 1970.

== Career ==
Schwartz served in the U.S. Marine Corps Reserves from 1968 to 1973 and completed his commitment with rank of captain. After working several years as a financial analyst at E. F. Hutton, Schwartz accumulated $100,000, quit the firm, and bought a seat on the American Stock Exchange where he began trading stocks options and futures.

In 1985, Schwartz began his own fund in which he would manage other people's money as well as his own. He wrote the book Pit Bull: Lessons from Wall Street's Champion Day Trader, based on that professional life, and published it in 1998.

== Personal life ==
Schwartz is a horse owner.

== Bibliography ==
Schwartz, Martin (1998). Pit Bull: Lessons from Wall Street's Champion Day Trader. Collins. ISBN 0-88730-956-9.
