= Hillsborough Stakes =

- Class: Grade II
- Location: Tampa Bay Downs; Oldsmar, Florida
- Inaugurated: 1999
- Race type: Thoroughbred – Flat racing
- Website: www.tampabaydowns.com

Race information
- Distance: 1 1/8 miles
- Surface: Turf
- Track: Left-handed
- Qualification: Fillies & Mares, four years old and older
- Weight: 123 lbs with allowances
- Purse: $225,000 (since 2018)

The Hillsborough Stakes is a Grade II American Thoroughbred horse race for fillies and mares that are four years old or older, over a distance of 1 1/8 miles on turf, held annually in March at Tampa Bay Downs racetrack in Oldsmar, Florida. The purse is currently $225,000.

== History ==
The event was inaugurated on 21 March 1999 at a distance of 1 1/16 miles with conditions for fillies and mares three-year-old and older and was won by the 7-10 odds-on favorite Pleasant Temper who was ridden by US Hall of Fame jockey Pat Day in a time of 1:42.62.

In 2004 the distance of the event was increased to 1 1/8 miles (9 furlongs). That same year the event was upgraded to Grade III.

The event was upgraded to Grade II status in 2016.

The winner of the 2012 Hillsborough, Zagora, won the Breeders' Cup Filly and Mare Turf and was voted an Eclipse Award in her category. Tepin, a two-time Eclipse Award winner, set a new course record when winning the race in 2016.

== Records ==
Speed record:

- 1 1/8 miles – 1:46.26 Tepin (2016)
- 1 1/16 miles – 1:41.14 Strait From Texas (2003)

Margins:

- 6 3/4 lengths – Dreaming of Anna (2008)

Most wins:

- No horse has won this race more than once.

Most wins by an owner:

- 2 – Godolphin Racing (2017, 2021)
- 2 – Madakat Stables (2019, 2023)
- 2 – Michael Dubb (2018, 2023)

Most wins by a jockey:

- 3 – John Velazquez (2006, 2007, 2015)

Most wins by a trainer:

- 7 – Chad C. Brown (2012, 2015, 2018, 2019, 2022, 2023, 2025)

== Winners ==
Year	Winner	Age	Jockey	Trainer	Owner	Distance	Time	Purse	Grade	Ref
2026	Destino d'Oro	4	Junior Alvarado	Brad H. Cox	Steve Landers Racing	1 1/8 miles	1:52.18	$200,000	II	
2025	Saffron Moon	6	Flavien Prat	Chad C. Brown	CHP Racing	1 1/8 miles	1:47.58	$200,000	II	
2024	Sparkle Blue	5	Jorge Ruiz	H. Graham Motion	Augustin Stable & Catherine Parke	1 1/8 miles	1:52.62	$200,000	II	
2023	Shantisara	5	Irad Ortiz Jr.	Chad C. Brown	Madakat Stables, Michael Dubb and Robert LaPenta	1 1/8 miles	1:47.14	$200,000	II	
2022	Bleecker Street	4	Hector Diaz Jr.	Chad C. Brown	Peter M. Brant	1 1/8 miles	1:48.21	$200,000	II	
2021	Micheline	4	Luis Saez	Michael Stidham	Godolphin Racing	1 1/8 miles	1:47.19	$200,000	II	
2020	Starship Jubilee	7	Javier Castellano	Kevin Attard	Blue Heaven Farm	1 1/8 miles	1:47.83	$225,000	II	
2019	Rymska (FR)	5	Irad Ortiz Jr.	Chad C. Brown	Madaket Stables, Tom Coleman, Team Hanley & Elayne Stables	1 1/8 miles	1:49.18	$200,000	II	
2018	Fourstar Crook	6	Irad Ortiz Jr.	Chad C. Brown	Michael Dubb, Bethlehem Stables & Gary Aisquith	1 1/8 miles	1:48.43	$200,000	II	
2017	Dickinson	5	Paco Lopez	Kiaran P. McLaughlin	Godolphin Racing	1 1/8 miles	1.46.75	$200,000	II	
2016	Tepin	5	Julien R. Leparoux	Mark E. Casse	Robert E. Masterson	1 1/8 miles	1:46.26	$200,000	II	
2015	Stephanie's Kitten	6	John R. Velazquez	Chad C. Brown	Kenneth & Sarah Ramsey	1 1/8 miles	1:49.05	$150,000	III	
2014	Cloud Scapes	5	Erick D. Rodriguez	H. Graham Motion	Pin Oak Stud	abt. 1 1/8 miles	1:51.56	$150,000	III	
2013	Old Tune (BRZ)	5	Joel Rosario	Todd A. Pletcher	Stud TNT	abt. 1 1/8 miles	1:48.92	$150,000	III	
2012	Zagora (FR)	5	Javier Castellano	Chad C. Brown	Martin S. Schwartz	abt. 1 1/8 miles	1:46.97	$150,000	III	
2011	Denomination	5	Frederic Lenclud	Christophe Clement	Ghislaine Head	abt. 1 1/8 miles	1:48.69	$150,000	III	
2010	Phola	4	Ramon A. Dominguez	Todd A. Pletcher	George Saufley, J.J. Pletcher, Graydon & William Patterson	abt. 1 1/8 miles	1:52.51	$150,000	III	
2009	Backseat Rhythm	4	Eibar Coa	Patrick L. Reynolds	Paul P. Pompa Jr.	abt. 1 1/8 miles	1:51.43	$175,000	III	
2008	Dreaming of Anna	4	Cornelio Velasquez	Wayne M. Catalano	Frank Carl Calabrese	abt. 1 1/8 miles	1:52.18	$175,000	III	
2007	Cassydora (GB)	5	John R. Velazquez	Todd A. Pletcher	Green Hills Farm	abt. 1 1/8 miles	1:48.90	$150,000	III	
2006	Ready's Gal	4	John R. Velazquez	Todd A. Pletcher	James T. Scatuorchio	abt. 1 1/8 miles	1:50.50	$137,500	III	
2005	Rizzi Girl	7	Oliver Castillo	William Downing	Joshua & Marnie Whitney	abt. 1 1/8 miles	1:52.59	$125,000	III	
2004	Coney Kitty (IRE)	6	Jose A. Santos	James J. Toner	William J. Betz, Steve Humphrey & Arthur Seelbinder	abt. 1 1/8 miles	1:48.83	$100,000	III	
2003	Strait From Texas	4	Jesus Lopez Castanon	James A. Michael	J & J Investments	1 1/16 miles	1:41.14	$100,000	Listed	
2002	Platinum Tiara	4	Manoel R. Cruz	Joseph J. Waunsch	M375 Thoroughbreds	1 1/16 miles	1:41.34	$100,000	Listed	
2001	Song for Annie	5	Larry Melancon	Henry S. Cochran	Live Oak Plantation	1 1/16 miles	1:41.23	$100,000	Listed	
2000	St Clair Ridge (IRE)	4	Pat Day	W. Elliott Walden	Thomas F. Van Meter II, Douglas Hendrickson & Mike Lowenbaum	1 1/16 miles	1:41.17	$75,000	Listed	
1999	Pleasant Temper	5	Pat Day	W. Elliott Walden	Mark H. Stanley	1 1/16 miles	1:42.62	$58,000	Listed	

== See also ==
- List of American and Canadian Graded races

== External sites ==
Tampa Bay Downs Media Guide 2021
