= Eclipse Award for Outstanding Trainer =

The Eclipse Award for Outstanding Trainer is an American Thoroughbred horse racing honor for trainers. Created in 1971, it is part of the Eclipse Awards program and is awarded annually.

Its Canadian counterpart is the Sovereign Award for Outstanding Trainer.

== Records ==
Most wins:

- 8 - Todd Pletcher (2004, 2005, 2006, 2007, 2010, 2013, 2014, 2022)
- 5 - Bill Mott (1995, 1996, 2011, 2023, 2025)
- 5 - Chad C. Brown (2016, 2017, 2018, 2019, 2024)
- 5 - Robert J. Frankel (1993, 2000, 2001, 2002, 2003)
- 4 - Laz Barrera (1976, 1977, 1978, 1979)
- 4 - D. Wayne Lukas (1985, 1986, 1987, 1994)
- 4 - Bob Baffert (1997, 1998, 1999, 2015)

Past winners:

- 1971 : Charlie Whittingham
- 1972 : Lucien Laurin
- 1973 : H. Allen Jerkens
- 1974 : Sherrill W. Ward
- 1975 : Stephen A. DiMauro
- 1976 : Laz Barrera
- 1977 : Laz Barrera
- 1978 : Laz Barrera
- 1979 : Laz Barrera
- 1980 : Bud Delp
- 1981 : Ron McAnally
- 1982 : Charlie Whittingham
- 1983 : Woody Stephens
- 1984 : Jack Van Berg
- 1985 : D. Wayne Lukas
- 1986 : D. Wayne Lukas
- 1987 : D. Wayne Lukas
- 1988 : Claude R. McGaughey III
- 1989 : Charlie Whittingham
- 1990 : Carl Nafzger
- 1991 : Ron McAnally
- 1992 : Ron McAnally
- 1993 : Robert J. Frankel
- 1994 : D. Wayne Lukas
- 1995 : William I. Mott
- 1996 : William I. Mott
- 1997 : Bob Baffert
- 1998 : Bob Baffert
- 1999 : Bob Baffert
- 2000 : Robert J. Frankel
- 2001 : Robert J. Frankel
- 2002 : Robert J. Frankel
- 2003 : Robert J. Frankel
- 2004 : Todd Pletcher
- 2005 : Todd Pletcher
- 2006 : Todd Pletcher
- 2007 : Todd Pletcher
- 2008 : Steve Asmussen
- 2009 : Steve Asmussen
- 2010 : Todd Pletcher
- 2011 : William I. Mott
- 2012 : Dale Romans
- 2013 : Todd Pletcher
- 2014 : Todd Pletcher
- 2015 : Bob Baffert
- 2016 : Chad C. Brown
- 2017 : Chad C. Brown
- 2018 : Chad C. Brown
- 2019 : Chad C. Brown
- 2020 : Brad H. Cox
- 2021 : Brad H. Cox
- 2022 : Todd Pletcher
- 2023 : Bill Mott
- 2024 : Chad C. Brown
- 2025 : Bill Mott
