= Elusive Wave =

Irish-bred Thoroughbred racehorse

- Sire: Elusive City
- Grandsire: Elusive Quality
- Dam: Multicolour Wave
- Damsire: Rainbow Quest
- Sex: Mare
- Foaled: 2006
- Country: Ireland
- Breeder: Pier House Stud
- Owner: Martin S. Schwartz
- Trainer: Jean Claude Rouget
- Record: 13: 6-2-1
- Earnings: €548,630

Major wins
- Prix du Calvados (2008); Prix Imprudence (2009); Poule d'Essai des Pouliches (2009); Prix Quincey (2010)

Elusive Wave (foaled April 20, 2006 in Ireland) is a Thoroughbred racehorse and broodmare based in France. She was bred by Pier House Stud. She is owned by Martin S. Schwartz. She was trained by Jean-Claude Rouget and ridden by Christophe Lemaire.

== Breeding record ==
2015 Filly, bred in Japan, by Deep Impact (JPN)

2016 Colt, bred in Japan, by Deep Impact (JPN)

== Pedigree ==
Pedigree of Elusive Wave
Sire Elusive City	Elusive Quality	Gone West	Mr. Prospector
Sire Elusive City	Elusive Quality	Gone West	Secrettame
Sire Elusive City	Elusive Quality	Touch of Greatness	Heros Honor
Sire Elusive City	Elusive Quality	Touch of Greatness	Ivory Wand
Sire Elusive City	Star of Paris	Dayjur	Danzig
Sire Elusive City	Star of Paris	Dayjur	Gold Beauty
Sire Elusive City	Star of Paris	Liturgism	Native Charger
Sire Elusive City	Star of Paris	Liturgism	Cult
Dam Multicolour Wave	Rainbow Quest	Blushing Groom	Red God
Dam Multicolour Wave	Rainbow Quest	Blushing Groom	Runaway Bride
Dam Multicolour Wave	Rainbow Quest	I Will Follow	Herbager
Dam Multicolour Wave	Rainbow Quest	I Will Follow	Where You Lead
Dam Multicolour Wave	Echoes	Niniski	Nijinski
Dam Multicolour Wave	Echoes	Niniski	Virginia Hills
Dam Multicolour Wave	Echoes	Equal Honor	Round Table
Dam Multicolour Wave	Echoes	Equal Honor	Bold Honor
