= Wayne M. Catalano =

American jockey (born 1956)

Personal information
- Born: July 24, 1956 (age 70) New Orleans, Louisiana, United States
- Occupation: Jockey / Trainer

Horse racing career
- Sport: Horse racing
- Career wins: Jockey: 1,792; Trainer: 2,650+ (ongoing)

Major racing wins
- Trainer: Lincoln Heritage Handicap (1994); Arkansas Derby (1997); Louisiana Derby (1997); Summer Stakes (2006); Endeavour Stakes (2008); Hillsborough Stakes (2008); Mint Julep Handicap (2008); Pat O'Brien Handicap (2008); Arlington-Washington Lassie Stakes (2007, 2009); Pucker Up Stakes (2007, 2013); Virginia Oaks (2007); Washington Park Handicap (2007); Arlington-Washington Futurity Stakes (2009, 2010); Alcibiades Stakes (2011); Edgewood Stakes (2012); Arlington Oaks (2014) Breeders' Cup wins: Breeders' Cup Juvenile Fillies (2006, 2009); Breeders' Cup Juvenile Fillies Turf (2011); Breeders' Cup Sprint (2021)

Racing awards
- Hawthorne Champion Trainer (1987, 1989, 2004); Sportsman's Park Champion Trainer (1988, 1989); Arlington Park Champion Trainer (2000, 2002-2003, 2005-2010)

Significant horses
- Animal Kingdom, Aloha West, Dreaming of Anna, She Be Wild, Stephanie's Kitten

Wayne M. Catalano (born July 24, 1956 in New Orleans, Louisiana) is a former jockey and current trainer in American Thoroughbred horse racing who has won four Breeders' Cup World Championship races and trained two Eclipse Award Champions.

== Jockey career ==
Wayne Catalano began riding in 1974, learning the business under U.S. Racing Hall of Fame trainer Jack Van Berg. In 1977 Catalano won 349 races, finishing second to Steve Cauthen in the national standings. Knee injuries ended his riding career in mid April 1983 after having won 1,792 races.

== Training career ==
Catalano immediately turned to training after his riding career ended. Working from a base in Chicago, he won his first training title in 1987 at Hawthorne Race Course and earned another in 1989 and again in 2004. He won back-to-back training titles in 1988–1989 at Sportsman's Park Racetrack and between 2000 and 2010 won nine training titles at Arlington Park.

In 2006, Wayne Catalano won the Breeders' Cup Juvenile Fillies with Dreaming of Anna and a second time in 2008 with She Be Wild. Both were voted American Champion Two-Year-Old Filly honors. In 2011, Catalano won his third Breeders Cup event, capturing the Breeders' Cup Juvenile Fillies Turf with Stephanie's Kitten. He also won the 2021 Breeders' Cup Sprint with Maryland-bred Aloha West.
