= Zagora (horse) =

French-bred Thoroughbred racehorse

- Sire: Green Tune
- Grandsire: Green Dancer
- Dam: Zaneton
- Damsire: Mtoto
- Sex: Mare
- Foaled: 13 March 2007
- Country: France
- Colour: Chestnut
- Breeder: E Puerari & Oceanic Bloodstock
- Owner: Martin Schwartz
- Trainer: Chad Brown
- Record: 22: 10-5-3
- Earnings: £1,531,893

Major wins
- Prix Vanteaux (2010); Prix de Psyché (2010); Diana Stakes (2011); Endeavour Stakes (2012); Hillsborough Stakes (2012); Gallorette Handicap (2012); Ballston Spa Stakes (2012); Breeders' Cup Filly & Mare Turf (2012)

Awards
- American Champion Female Turf Horse (2012)

Zagora (foaled March 13, 2007) is a retired French Thoroughbred racehorse with graded stakes wins on two continents and two countries. Defeating horses like G1 Gamely Stakes winner Marketing Mix, Breeders' Cup Juvenile Fillies Turf winner Tapitsfly, European champion The Fugue, American Oaks winner Lady of Shamrock, Matriarch Stakes winner Stormy Lucy, and Flower Bowl Invitational Stakes winner Nahrain.

== Racing career ==
=== European career ===
Zagora had 9 starts in her home country of France, winning four times including victories in the Prix Vanteaux, and the Prix de Psyché.

=== 2011: four-year-old season ===
For Zagora's 4-year-old season, she was imported to the United States. She made five starts and won once in the Grade I Diana Stakes. She also ran in the Jenny Wiley Stakes but did not run in the Breeders' Cup.

=== 2012: five-year-old season ===
As a 5 year old Zagora won both the Hillsborough Stakes, and the Endeavour Stakes. After a 5th in the Jenny Wiley she won the Gallorette Handicap. She won the Breeders' Cup Filly & Mare Turf.

== Career and earnings ==
Her final career statistics were 22-10-5-3 and a total of $2,368,589 in earnings.
