= American Champion Female Turf Horse =

The American Champion Female Turf Horse award is an American Thoroughbred horse racing honor. It is part of the Eclipse Awards program and is awarded annually to a female horse (filly or mare) for her performance on grass race courses.

Until 1978 there was a Best Turf Horse award, open to both male and female horse. During this time, Dahlia was the only filly voted Best Turf Horse. In 1979 an individual category was created for each of the sexes.

== Records ==
Most wins:

- 2 – Miesque (1987, 1988)
- 2 – Flawlessly (1992, 1993)
- 2 – Ouija Board (2004, 2006)
- 2 – Goldikova (2009, 2010)
- 2 – Tepin (2015, 2016)

Most wins by a trainer:

- 7 – Chad Brown (2012, 2014, 2017, 2018, 2019, 2020, 2022)

Most wins by an owner:

- 4 – Khalid Abdullah (1996, 1997, 2001, 2005)

== Honorees ==
Year	Horse	Age	Trainer	Owner
2025	She Feels Pretty	4	Cherie DeVaux	Lael Stables (Roy & Gretchen Jackson)
2024	Moira (CAN)	5	Kevin Attard	DM Racing Ventures
2023	Inspiral (GB)	4	John H. Gosden	Cheveley Park Stud
2022	Regal Glory	6	Chad C. Brown	Peter M. Brant
2021	Loves Only You (JPN)	5	Yoshito Yahagi	DMM Dream Club Co., Ltd
2020	Rushing Fall	5	Chad Brown	e Five Racing Thoroughbreds
2019	Uni	5	Chad Brown	Michael Dubb, Head Of Plains Partners LLC Et Al
2018	Sistercharlie (IRE)	4	Chad Brown	Peter M. Brant
2017	Lady Eli	5	Chad Brown	Sheep Pond Partners
2016	Tepin	5	Mark Casse	Robert E Masterson
2015	Tepin	4	Mark Casse	Robert E Masterson
2014	Dayatthespa	5	Chad Brown	Jerry Frankel et al.
2013	Dank (GB)	4	Michael Stoute	James Wigan
2012	Zagora (FRA)	5	Chad Brown	Martin S. Schwartz
2011	Stacelita (FRA)	5	Jean-Claude Rouget	Martin S. Schwartz
2010	Goldikova (IRE)	5	Freddy Head	Wertheimer et Frère
2009	Goldikova (IRE)	4	Freddy Head	Wertheimer et Frère
2008	Forever Together	4	Jonathan E. Sheppard	Augustin Stable
2007	Lahudood	4	Kiaran McLaughlin	Shadwell Racing
2006	Ouija Board (GB)	5	Ed Dunlop	Lord Derby
2005	Intercontinental (GB)	5	Robert J. Frankel	Khalid Abdullah
2004	Ouija Board (GB)	3	Ed Dunlop	Lord Derby
2003	Islington (IRE)	4	Michael Stoute	Ballymacoll Stud
2002	Golden Apples	4	Ben D. A. Cecil	Gary A. Tanaka
2001	Banks Hill (GB)	3	André Fabre	Khalid Abdullah
2000	Perfect Sting	4	Joe Orseno	Stronach Stables
1999	Soaring Softly	4	James J. Toner	Joan & John Phillips
1998	Fiji	4	Neil Drysdale	Fahd Salman
1997	Ryafan	3	John Gosden	Khalid Abdullah
1996	Wandesta	5	Robert J. Frankel	Khalid Abdullah
1995	Possibly Perfect	5	Robert J. Frankel	Blue Vista Inc
1994	Hatoof	5	Criquette Head	Maktoum Al Maktoum
1993	Flawlessly	5	Charles E. Whittingham	Harbor View Farm
1992	Flawlessly	4	Charles E. Whittingham	Harbor View Farm
1991	Miss Alleged (FRA)	4	Pascal Bary	Fares Farm
1990	Laugh and Be Merry	5	Angel Penna Jr.	Pin Oak Stable
1989	Brown Bess	7	Charles Jenda	Calbourne Farm
1988	Miesque	4	François Boutin	Stavros Niarchos
1987	Miesque	3	François Boutin	Stavros Niarchos
1986	Estrapade	6	Charles E. Whittingham	Allen E. Paulson
1985	Pebbles (GB)	4	Clive Brittain	Sheikh Mohammed
1984	Royal Heroine (IRE)	4	John Gosden	Robert Sangster
1983	All Along (FRA)	4	Patrick Biancone	Daniel Wildenstein
1982	April Run (IRE)	4	François Boutin	Diana M. Firestone
1981	De La Rose	3	Woody Stephens	Henryk de Kwiatkowski
1980	Just A Game (IRE)	4	David A. Whiteley	Peter M. Brant
1979	Trillion	5	Maurice Zilber	Nelson Bunker Hunt
