= Tampa Bay Downs =

Horse racing venue in Florida

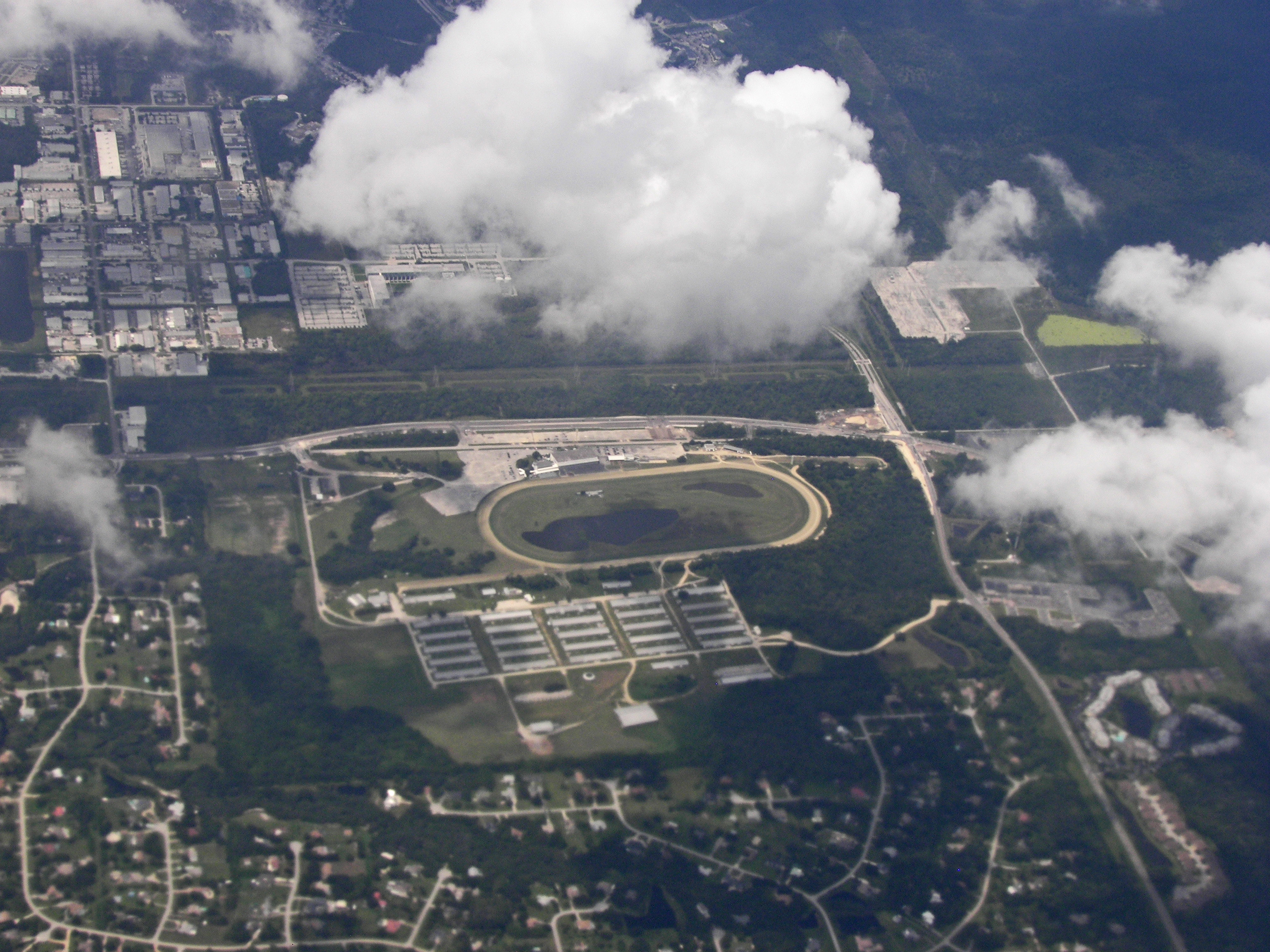
- Aerial view of Tampa Bay Downs from the east.
- Interactive map of Tampa Bay Downs
- Location: Oldsmar, Florida
- Coordinates: 28°02′54″N 82°38′44″W
- Owned by: Stella F. Thayer, Howell Ferguson
- Date opened: 18 February 1926; 100 years ago
- Race type: Thoroughbred

Tampa Bay Downs is an American Thoroughbred horse racing facility located in Westchase in Hillsborough County in the U.S. state of Florida, just outside Tampa. It opened in 1926 under the name Tampa Downs, and has also been known as Sunshine Park and Florida Downs and Turf Club.

== Season ==
The track races most Wednesdays, Fridays, and weekends from the end of November to the beginning of May.

== Physical attributes ==
The main track is a one-mile (1.6 km) dirt oval. The turf course is seven furlongs and includes a quarter-mile inner chute. It is regarded as one of the best turf courses in the country. Tampa Bay Downs, the only Thoroughbred race track on the west coast of Florida, has live racing action, simulcasting, poker, as well as golf at The Downs Golf Practice Facility.

== History ==
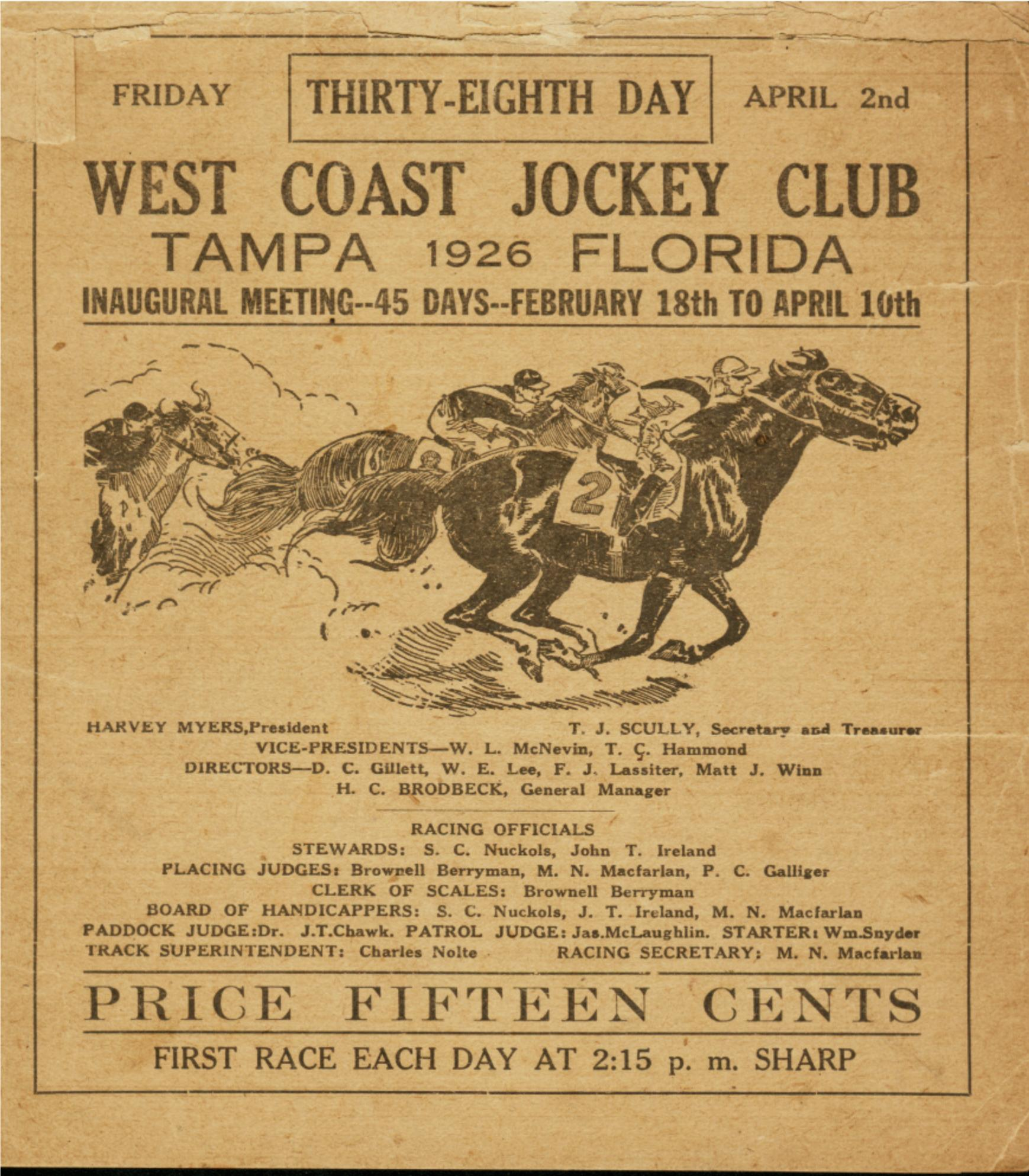
A photo of the original cover of the West Coast Jockey Club; Inaugural Meeting, 42nd day of racing.

Tampa Bay Downs first opened its doors in 1926 under the name of Tampa Downs as the racetrack of the West Coast Jockey Club, and has since amassed a long and colorful history. The founding operation was headed by Ohio investor Harvey Myers and Kentucky Colonel Matt J. Winn.

In 1943, the United States Army took over the track for use as a training facility.

In 1946, the track was renamed Sunshine Park, and entered the modern era with the installation of an electric starting gate, photo finish and electric tote board.

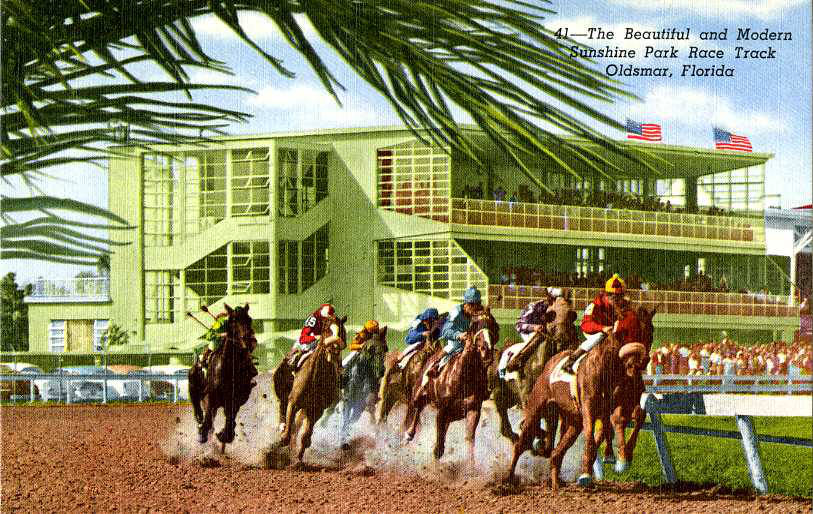
Postcard of Tampa Bay Downs, 1956

During the 1950s, the racecourse was a popular attraction with many sportswriters who came to the Tampa Bay area to cover baseball spring training. Legendary names like Grantland Rice, Red Smith, Fred Russell and Arthur Daley became regular visitors, calling the track the "Santa Anita of the South."

The year 1965 marked the third name change for the track when it became Florida Downs and Turf Club. The track was renamed Tampa Bay Downs in 1980.

On February 12, 1981, Julie Krone, then a 17-year-old apprentice jockey and now a U.S. Racing Hall of Fame member, got her first career victory here on Lord Farkle.

In 1983 the track began running periodic Arabian horse races. The Arabian-bred program ended in 2003.

The present owners, Stella F. Thayer and her brother Howell Ferguson, purchased the track in its entirety at auction in 1986. They had previously co-owned the track with George Steinbrenner, but a legal dispute between the two sides forced the auction.

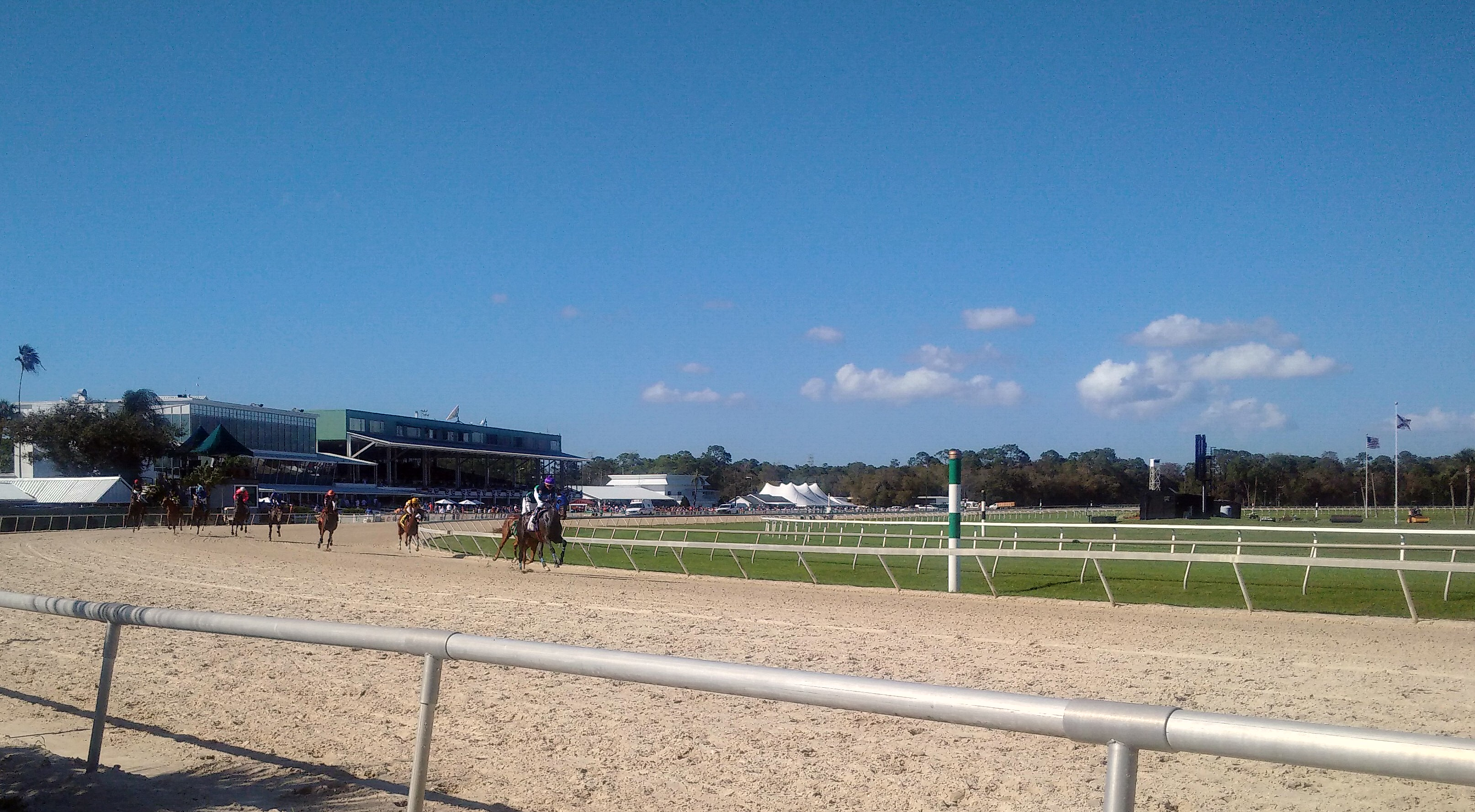
Tampa Bay Downs grandstand and dirt track, with adjacent turf course (2019)

In 1998 Tampa Bay Downs added its 7/8-mile grass track, complete with a quarter-mile chute, which has become one of the most popular turf courses in North America. The course was completed in the spring of 1998 and the first race was contested on Kentucky Derby Day, May 2, 1998. This new avenue has provided more opportunities for horsemen and patrons alike. Other renovations include a 22-acre (89,000 m^{2}) golf range and short-game area called The Downs Golf Practice Facility, including a 270-yard (250 m) driving range and betting machines.

When Tampa Bay Downs concluded its 81st season on May 6, 2007, the track had established new records in handle, attendance and purses paid, including an all-time attendance mark of 11,014 on Kentucky Derby Day, May 5, 2007, which featured Tampa Bay Derby winner Street Sense becoming the first graduate of the Tampa Bay Derby to win the Kentucky Derby. A new single-day attendance record of 12,746 was established March 15, 2008 on Festival Day, featuring the Tampa Bay Derby. Tampa Bay Derby Day 2007 also marked the Oldsmar oval's highest-ever handle, with $10,916,634 wagered on the Tampa Bay Downs signal on that day; a new mark of $10,949,948 was set March 12, 2011.

Street Sense and Any Given Saturday were two of the notable horses that competed over the Tampa Bay Downs surface in the 2006-2007 racing season, with Street Sense defeating his rival by a nose in the Tampa Bay Derby. More recently, 2010 Kentucky Derby winner Super Saver, Eclipse Award turf champion Gio Ponti, Belmont Stakes and Breeders' Cup Classic winner Drosselmeyer, Breeders' Cup Classic winner Fort Larned, Eclipse Award winner Tepin, Kentucky Derby winner Always Dreaming, Belmont winner Tapwrit, and Eclipse Award winner Nest have raced at Tampa Bay Downs.

The Silks Poker Room opened on December 13, 2003.

Tampa Bay Downs has 28 stakes scheduled for the 2018-2019 meeting, including six that are graded. The Lambholm South Tampa Bay Derby, contested March 9 for a $400,000 purse, is a Grade III race for 3-year-olds. The $250,000 Sam F. Davis Stakes for 3-year-olds, a Grade III event, is Feb. 9. Other graded races are scheduled on the turf: the Grade II, $225,000 Hillsborough Stakes for older fillies and mares; the Grade III, $200,000 Florida Oaks for 3-year-old fillies; the Grade III, $175,000 Lambholm South Endeavour Stakes for older fillies and mares; and the Grade III, $175,000 Tampa Bay Stakes for horses 4-years-old and upward.

Before the 2007-2008 race meet began, Tampa Bay Downs underwent several renovations, including the installation of the Grandstand elevator; the all-new Silks Poker Room, located on the third floor of the Grandstand; and the Party Suite, adjacent to the Silks Poker Room, which was also updated with new flat-screen TVs installed. The Legends Bar, which includes a museum-quality exhibition of famed Thoroughbred Seabiscuit, became the newest feature of the Legends Bar on the second floor of the Grandstand. Horsemen enjoyed improvements to the Paddock area, with all-new stalls in the saddling barn ensuring the safety and comfort of horses and their connections. Other facility upgrades at the Oldsmar oval include a refurbished Racing Office on the backstretch, as well as a renovated track kitchen.

Average daily wagering handle during the 2010–11, 90-day meeting was a record $4,572,074, an increase of 9.2 percent from the previous season. The average field size of 9.11 horses per race was among the highest in the country and was aided by an increase in the number of turf races, from 205 to 243. Average daily attendance was 3,195. The 31st running of the Tampa Bay Derby on March 12 attracted a record all-source wagering handle of $10,949,948, which included $876,063 wagered on track. In 2022 Tampa Bay Downs continued to have a successful race meet and averaged $488,998 in handle per race. In 2023 Florida Gov. Ron DeSantis signed a bill raising purses for Florida Bred horses at Tampa Bay Downs and Gulfstream Park.

Prior to the 2011–2012 meeting, Tampa Bay Downs began a green initiative to eventually result in a net-zero impact on the environment. Other improvements included a CREE LED lighting system in the clubhouse and grandstand and the installation of a Gaco Sil S-20 Cool Roof coating system.

The 2024 edition of the Tampa Bay Derby was run for purse money only with no betting after problems from telecommunications supplier Lumen Technologies affected tote provider AmTote, leaving Tampa Bay Downs and several other tracks around the country unable to process wagers.

In April 2026, Tampa Bay Downs hosted a meet-up for fans of Umamusume: Pretty Derby, a franchise about girls personifying mainly Japanese racehorses. This also included the first cosplay races in North America after such events had occurred in Japan, Thailand, Malaysia, Indonesia and Peru.

For the 2027 season, Tampa Bay Downs has announced a prize increase for the Tampa Bay Derby from $400,000 to $500,000 courtesy of ESMARK, the race's sponsor, setting a new prize record for the track.

Track announcers

- Richard Grunder (1988–2021)
  - Second Longest Tenured Announcer In America
- Jason Beem (2021–present)

== Racing ==
In 2007, Hall of Fame trainer Carl Nafzger brought his 3-year-old Street Sense to Oldsmar for the Tampa Bay Derby, and the colt's victory was a springboard to his win in the Kentucky Derby at Churchill Downs. Another Hall of Fame trainer, William Mott, selected Tampa Bay Downs for the first 2011 starts for his 3-year-old filly Royal Delta and 4-year-old colt Drosselmeyer. Royal Delta went on to twice win the Breeders' Cup Distaff and Drosselmeyer won the Breeders' Cup Classic.

The track's annual showcase is Festival Day. The centerpiece is the Grade III, $500,000 Tampa Bay Derby for 3-year-olds at a mile-and-a-sixteenth. Also on the card are the Grade II, $225,000 Hillsborough Stakes for older fillies and mares at a mile-and-an-eighth on the turf; the Grade III, $200,000 Florida Oaks, for 3-year-old fillies at a mile-and-a-sixteenth on the turf, the $100,000 Challenger Stakes; and the $75,000 Columbia Stakes, creating a $1-million bonanza in stakes purses.

=== Stakes races ===
As well as numerous non-graded stakes races, the track holds two Grade IIs and five Grade III stakes races.

Grade II

- Hillsborough Stakes

Grade III

- Challenger Stakes
- Endeavour Stakes
- Florida Oaks
- Tampa Bay Derby
- Tampa Bay Stakes

Listed races

- Columbia Stakes
- Gasparilla Stakes
- Inaugural Stakes
- Lightning City Stakes
- Minaret Stakes
- Pasco Stakes
- Pelican Stakes
- Sam F. Davis Stakes
- Sandpiper Stakes
- Suncoast Stakes
- Turf Dash
- Wayward Lass Stakes

== See also ==
- List of casinos in Florida
