= Chad Brown (horse trainer) =

American horse trainer (born 1978)

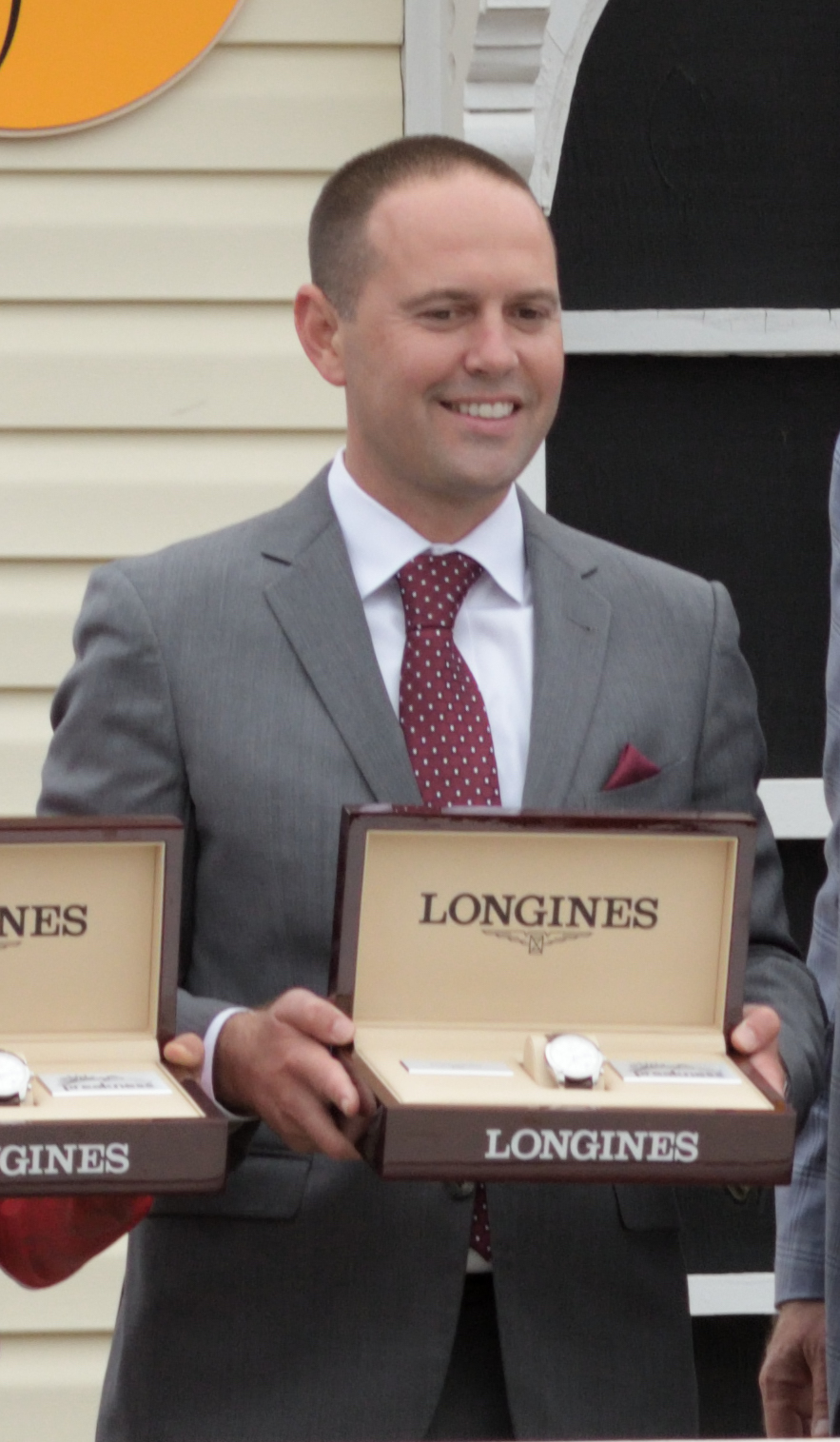
- Brown after winning the 2017 Preakness Stakes

Personal information
- Born: December 18, 1978 (age 47) Mechanicville, New York, U.S.
- Occupation: Trainer

Horse racing career
- Sport: Horse racing
- Career wins: 2,875+ (ongoing)

Major racing wins
- Maker's Mark Mile Stakes American Classics wins: Preakness Stakes (2017, 2022) Breeders' Cup wins: Breeders' Cup Classic (2024); Breeders' Cup Juvenile Fillies Turf (2008, 2014, 2016, 2017, 2018, 2023); Breeders' Cup Filly & Mare Turf (2012, 2014, 2015, 2018); Breeders' Cup Filly & Mare Sprint (2015, 2022, 2023); Breeders' Cup Juvenile Turf (2019); Breeders' Cup Mile (2019); Breeders' Cup Turf (2019); Breeders' Cup Juvenile (2017); Breeders' Cup Turf Sprint (2014)

Racing awards
- Eclipse Award for Outstanding Trainer (2016, 2017, 2018, 2019, 2024); United States Champion Thoroughbred Trainer by earnings (2016, 2017, 2018, 2019, 2022, 2024); New York Racing Association, (NYRA) Year-End Training Title (2015, 2016, 2017, 2018, 2019, 2020, 2021, 2022)

Significant horses
- Awesome Feather, Big Blue Kitten, Beach Patrol, Bobby's Kitten, Bricks and Mortar, Chancer McPatrick, Cloud Computing, Dayatthespa, Flintshire, Good Magic, Goodnight Olive, In Italian, Jack Christopher, Lady Eli, Maram, Newspaperofrecord, Practical Joke, Regal Glory, Search Results, Sierra Leone, Sistercharlie, Stacelita, Stephanie's Kitten, Zagora

Chad C. Brown (born December 18, 1978) is an American racehorse trainer. Brown's achievements include two Preakness Stakes victories and multiple Breeders' Cup wins. In 2024 Brown's Sierra Leone won the Breeders' Cup Classic and the Eclipse Award for American Champion Three-Year-Old Male Horse. He has won five Eclipse Award for Outstanding Trainer. In 2019, he was the first America trainer to be ranked first in the World Training Standings according to the Thoroughbred Racing Commentary (TRC) Global Rankings.

Initially labeled as a turf trainer because of his initial successes, particularly with training fillies and mares, he went on to produce winners with horses of all sexes at a variety of distances and surfaces. As of 2024, Brown has trained 19 Breeders' Cup winners, and 14 Eclipse Award winners.

== Background ==
Brown was born and raised in Mechanicville, New York. His passion for horses began at an early age, sparked by family visits to the nearby Saratoga race track. During high school, Brown gained hands-on experience with Standardbreds at Saratoga Raceway, where he learned the intricacies of breaking and training horses. Despite his early work with Standardbreds, his ambition was always to work with Thoroughbreds.

While pursuing a degree in animal science at Cornell University, with the goal of becoming a veterinarian, Brown took a summer job with Hall of Fame trainer Shug McGaughey. Starting as a hot-walker, he quickly advanced to a groom, before earning the role of foreman. After graduating from Cornell in 2001 with a degree in animal husbandry, Brown realized that his true passion lay in training horses rather than veterinary medicine, leading him to pursue a career as a Thoroughbred trainer.

== Controversy ==
In April 2022, Chad Brown was arrested on charges of domestic violence for allegedly pushing a woman down a flight of stairs and trying to choke her.

== Training career ==
Brown's career as a trainer was significantly influenced by his five-year mentorship with Hall of Fame trainer Robert Frankel, beginning in 2002. While working as an assistant trainer under Frankel, Brown split his time between Southern California and Saratoga while also overseeing Frankel's operations in Kentucky, (Keeneland and Churchill Downs), Monmouth Park and Gulfstream Park. During this period, Brown worked with top racehorses such as Medaglia d'Oro, Empire Maker, Aldebaran, Ghostzapper, Intercontinental, and Ginger Punch. Brown credits Frankel's training methods, particularly his focus on each horse's unique strengths, as the foundation of his future success. Brown dedicated Cloud Computing's Preakness Stakes win to Frankel, stating that, "I feel this is for him... without his mentorship I certainly wouldn't be here."

In 2007, Brown gained national attention at the Breeders' Cup, when he stepped in for Frankel, who could not be at the races, saddling Ginger Punch to victory in the Breeders' Cup Distaff. Shortly after, Brown established his own stable with a small string of ten horses, including those owned by Ken and Sarah Ramsey and Gary and Mary West. His first win as an independent trainer came at Churchill Downs in a $5,000 claiming race with his second starter, Dual Jewels. Brown spent the winter at Oaklawn Park and later moved to Keeneland, where he achieved his second win. During that time, his stable had a total of four starts, resulting in one win and one third-place finish, earning a total of $13,960.

By January 2008, just three months after launching his own stable, Brown expressed his ambition to be “the next Bobby Frankel.” Brown's goals included adhering to what he called "Bobby's System," "a method of meticulous care inspired by Frankel's legacy." That year, Brown competed in his first Saratoga meet, finishing the meet with 6 wins from 18 starters, including the debut of the two-year-old filly Maram, who went on to win the Miss Grillo Stakes at Belmont Park, marking Brown's first graded stakes victory. Maram went on to win the Breeders' Cup Juvenile Fillies Turf at Santa Anita Park, giving Brown his first Breeder's Cup win.

In 2009, Brown won his first New York Racing Association training title at the Aqueduct Racetrack fall meet. In 2010, Brown saddled 17 winners at Saratoga Race Course finishing third in the standings. In 2011, Brown won his first career Grade I race with the French-bred mare Zagora in the Diana Stakes at Saratoga Race Course. Just two weeks later, he secured his second Grade I victory with Stacelita, in the Beverly D. Stakes at Arlington Park. Stacelita went on to win the Flower Bowl Invitational and the Breeders' Cup Filly & Mare Turf, resulting in the Eclipse Award for Outstanding Female Turf Horse.

The following year, 2012, Zagora won several major stakes, including the Breeders' Cup Filly and Mare Turf. She would become the second Eclipse Award winner trained by Brown when named Champion Turf Female. Brown tied for the Belmont Racetrack fall training title and his second NYRA training title with 21 wins. In 2013, Brown ranked third among North American trainers, earning $13,395,419 in purse money. Highlights included Big Blue Kitten's victories in the United Nations Handicap, the Sword Dancer Invitational, and the Arlington Million with Real Solution for Ken and Sarah Ramsey, and also won the Belmont Racetrack fall training title with 26 wins. Brown had three Breeders' Cup victories in 2014, and was a finalist for the Eclipse Award for Outstanding Trainer, with his stable earning $15,383,930 in purse money. His Breeders' Cup Filly & Mare Turf winner, Dayatthespa won the Eclipse Award for Outstanding Female Turf Horse. At the 2015 Breeders' Cup, Brown had two wins. Big Blue Kitten also achieved several victories including setting a course record in the Joe Hirsch Turf Classic Stakes, and trained Big Blue Kitten, who won the Eclipse Award for Outstanding Male Turf Horse.

Brown took over the training of Juddmonte Farm's Flintshire in 2016, who then won the Manhattan Stakes (G1) in his first start under Brown. On August 24 at Saratoga, Brown earned his 1,000th career win with Mr. Maybe. He ended the Saratoga meet with 40 wins and the leading trainer title. His wins included the Hopeful Stakes (G1) with Practical Joke, his first graded stakes win on the dirt at Saratoga. That year he won the Eclipse Award for Outstanding Trainer for the first time.

Brown won his first Triple Crown race in 2017 with Cloud Computing in the Preakness Stakes, an upset victory at odds of 13:1. Later that year, Good Magic captured the Breeders' Cup Juvenile. and the Eclipse Award for Champion Two Year Old Colt. Additionally, Lady Eli who recovered from a severe case of laminitis under Brown's care, became the Champion Turf Female. These successes and 16 other Grade I wins led to his second Eclipse Award for Outstanding Trainer. In 2018, Brown had 20 Grade 1 victories and 47 graded wins overall, earning $27,546,057, At the Breeders' Cup, Newspaperofrecord won the Juvenile Fillies Turf and Sistercharlie triumphed in the Breeders' Cup Filly and Mare Turf, Brown's fourth win in that specific race, the most by any trainer. Sistercharlie was named Champion Turf Female and Brown won his third consecutive Eclipse Award for Outstanding Trainer.

Brown set a North American record in 2019 with $31,112,144 in earnings, the highest ever for a trainer in a single year. His achievements included three more Breeders' Cup victories, bringing his career total to fifteen, placing him third all-time among trainers. Significant wins in 2019 included Bricks and Mortar's victories in the Pegasus World Cup Turf Invitational, the Manhattan Stakes, and the Arlington Million, leading to winning the Eclipse Award for Horse of the Year. Brown also trained Uni, who was Champion Turf Female. Brown himself scored his fourth consecutive Eclipse Award for Outstanding Trainer. Brown was also ranked #1 in the TRC Global Rankings, becoming the first American trainer to achieve the distinction of being the World's Number One Trainer. On June 11, 2020, Brown secured his 100th Grade 1 win with Guarana in the Madison Stakes, becoming the fastest and youngest trainer to achieve 100 Grade 1 wins since the grading system began in 1973, described as a "Meteoric Rise" by the Paulick Report. Brown saw his 2,000th career win in 2021 with Digital Software at Saratoga on August 7.

Brown won his second Preakness Stakes in 2022 with Early Voting. In the fall, Brown increased his total Breeders' Cup wins to 16. He won his eighth consecutive year-end NYRA training title, and was ranked number one in the North America Training rankings, leading the United States in earnings with a total of $31,057,362, with 244 wins, and 51 Graded Stakes victories. He had nine Grade I winners and two Breeders’ Cup victories in 2023.

In 2024, Brown won his fifth Eclipse Award for Outstanding Trainer in the United States and winning the American Champion Three-Year-Old Male Horse with Sierra Leone. Sierra Leone was part of a dramatic three-way photo finish in Kentucky Derby, finishing second, and won the Breeders' Cup Classic. Brown also achieved a record ninth win in the Diana Stakes with Whitebeam. Additionally, Brown again won the training title at Saratoga Race Course meet with 45 wins, six in Grade I races, his seventh Saratoga title and his 32nd at a New York Racing Association Inc. (NYRA) meet. Brown had earnings of $30,866,710 for the year, bringing his career total to $306,154,922.

== Year-end rankings, earnings and wins ==
North American Rankings, Earnings and Wins
Year	# of Starts	Rank by Earnings	Earnings	Rank by Wins	Wins	Win%	WPS%
2007	4	4,908	$13,960		1	25%	50%
2008	155	146	$1,570,986		31	20%	50%
2009	221	112	$1,733,240		50	23%	55%
2010	307	32	$3,046,710		67	22%	56%
2011	410	15	$5,243,488	50	95	23%	56%
2012	494	5	$11,060,710	17	138	28%	63%
2013	543	3	$13,375,419	15	148	27%	61%
2014	581	2	$15,383,930	15	147	25%	57%
2015	768	2	$20,235,459	6	204	27%	57%
2016	763	1	$23,134,394	9	182	24%	57%
2017	820	1	$26,202,164	7	213	26%	61%
2018	839	1	$27,546,057	5	224	27%	61%
2019	823	1	$31,112,144	6	220	27%	62%
2020	746	4	$16,578,956	9	174	23%	60%
2021	839	3	$22,213,740	11	196	23%	58%
2022	920	1	$31,057,362	4	244	27%	52%
2023	909	4	$25,715,901	4	207	23%	54%
