= Breeders' Cup Filly & Mare Turf top three finishers =

This is a listing of the horses that finished in either first, second, or third place and the number of starters in the Breeders' Cup Filly & Mare Turf, a grade one race run on grass on Saturday of the Breeders' Cup World Thoroughbred Championships.

Year	Winner	Second	Third	Starters
2026	Kathynmarisa	Gimme A Nother	Jancis	12
2025	Gezora	She Feels Pretty	Diamond Rain	13
2024	Moira	Cinderella’s Dream	Didia	12
2023	Inspiral	Warm Heart	Moira	12
2022	Tuesday	In Italian	Lady Speightspeare	12
2021	Loves Only You	My Sister Nat	War Like Goddess	12
2020	Audarya	Rushing Fall	Harvey's Lil Goil	14
2019	Iridessa	Vasilika	Sistercharlie	10
2018	Sistercharlie	Wild Illusion	A Raving Beauty	14
2017	Wuheida	Rhododendron	Cambodia	14
2016	Queen's Trust	Lady Eli	Avenge	13
2015	Stephanie's Kitten	Legatissimo	Queen's Jewel	10
2014	Dayatthespa	Stephanie's Kitten	Just The Judge	11
2013	Dank	Romantica	Alterite	10
2012	Zagora	Marketing Mix	The Fugue	11
2011	Perfect Shirl	Nahrain	Misty For Me	11
2010	Shared Account	Midday	Keertana	11
2009	Midday	Pure Clan	Forever Together	8
2008	Forever Together	Sealy Hill	Wait a While	9
2007	Lahudood	Honey Ryder	Passage of Time	11
2006	Ouija Board	Film Maker	Honey Ryder	10
2005	Intercontinental	Ouija Board	Film Maker	14
2004	Ouija Board	Film Maker	Wonder Again	12
2003	Islington	L'Ancresse	Yesterday	12
2002	Starine	Banks Hill	Islington	12
2001	Banks Hill	Spook Express	Spring Oak	12
2000	Perfect Sting	Tout Charmant	Catell	14
1999	Soaring Softly	Coretta	Zomaradah	14
