= Dansili =

British-bred Thoroughbred racehorse

- Racing silks of Khalid Abdullah
- Sire: Danehill
- Grandsire: Danzig
- Dam: Hasili
- Damsire: Kahyasi
- Sex: Stallion
- Foaled: 27 January 1996
- Died: 22 December 2021 (aged 25)
- Country: Great Britain
- Colour: Bay
- Breeder: Juddmonte Farms
- Owner: Khalid Abdullah
- Trainer: André Fabre
- Record: 14: 5-4-3
- Earnings: £373,602

Major wins
- Prix Messidor (1999); Prix Edmond Blanc (2000); Prix du Muguet (2000)

Awards
- Leading sire in France (2006)
- Last updated on 21 December 2021

Dansili (27 January 1996 – 22 December 2021) was a British Thoroughbred racehorse. He won five races, including the Prix du Muguet. After retiring from racing he became a successful stallion, with his progeny including Prix de l'Arc de Triomphe winner Rail Link and King George VI and Queen Elizabeth Stakes winner Harbinger. He also became Champion sire in France in 2006.

== Background ==
Dansili, a bay colt, was foaled on 27 January 1996. Bred by Juddmonte Farms, he is a son of Haydock Sprint Cup winner Danehill. Danehill was a British Champion sire three times and sired many top horses, with his progeny including Banks Hill, Champs Elysees, Desert King, Duke of Marmalade, Dylan Thomas, George Washington, Mozart, Rock of Gibraltar, and Westerner.

Dansili's dam, Hasili, won four races as a two-year-old and is a daughter of Epsom Derby winner Kahyasi. She has also foaled Prix Jacques Le Marois winner Banks Hill, Breeders' Cup Filly & Mare Turf winner Intercontinental, Man o' War Stakes winner Cacique, Matriarch Stakes winner Heat Haze and Canadian International Stakes winner Champs Elysees. Banks Hill, Intercontinental, Cacique, and Champs Elysees were also sired by Danehill.

== Racing career ==
Dansili's only run as a two-year-old was in the Prix de Blaison at Longchamp, where he won by half a length over Bedawin. He returned as a three-year-old in May and won the Prix du Labyrinthe. He then started as the 17/5 joint-favourite for the Poule d'Essai des Poulains. He finished in second place, 1½ lengths behind Sendawar. Dansili then finished fourth in the Prix Jean Prat. He then dropped in class for the Group 3 Prix Messidor and won it by four lengths over Kabool. In his last two races of the season he finished in third behind Dubai Millennium in the Prix du Haras de Fresnay-le-Buffard Jacques Le Marois and third behind Sendawar in the Prix du Moulin de Longchamp.

Dansili started his four-year-old career by winning the Prix Edmond Blanc and Prix du Muguet. He then went to Royal Ascot for the Queen Anne Stakes. Racing outside France for the first time, he started at the odds of 100/30. Ridden by Olivier Peslier, he took the lead with one furlong left to run, but was overtaken by Kalanisi in the final 100 yards. Kalanisi went on to win by half a length over Dansili, who just held off Swallow Flight to secure second place. He then finished second again in the Sussex Stakes. This time he was beaten by Giant's Causeway by ¾ length. Racing again in France, he then disappointed in the Prix du Moulin de Longchamp after starting as favourite. In his final two races he finished second behind Indian Lodge in the Prix de la Forêt and third behind War Chant in the Breeders' Cup Mile. During his racing career Dansili earned £373,602.

== Stud career ==
After the 2000 season, Dansili was retired to stud, where he became a successful stallion at Banstead Manor Stud for Juddmonte Farms. His son Harbinger was officially the highest rated horse in the world in 2010. Dansili is the sire of 21 individual Group 1 winners including Harbinger, The Fugue, Flintshire, Zoffany, Passage Of Time, Fallen For You, Emulous, and Winsili. His Group 2 winning sprinter son, Bated Breath, stands as a stallion at Banstead Manor Stud. Dansili is also the broodmare sire of many successful performers, including Group 1 winners Astaire, Chicquita, and Expert Eye.

Dansili was retired from stud duty in April 2018 due to declining fertility. He died after a short but aggressive illness on 22 December 2021, at the age of 25. He would have turned 26 the following month.

=== Notable progeny ===
c = colt, f = filly

Foaled	Name	Sex	Major wins
2003	Price Tag	f	Matriarch Stakes
2003	Rail Link	c	Grand Prix de Paris, Prix de l'Arc de Triomphe
2004	Passage Of Time	f	Critérium de Saint-Cloud
2004	Zambezi Sun	c	Grand Prix de Paris
2005	Proviso	f	Frank E. Kilroe Mile Handicap, Just A Game Stakes, Diana Stakes, First Lady Stakes
2006	Harbinger	c	King George VI and Queen Elizabeth Stakes
2007	Emulous	f	Matron Stakes
2007	Foreteller	c	Ranvet Stakes, Makybe Diva Stakes, Underwood Stakes
2008	Giofra	f	Falmouth Stakes
2008	Laughing	f	Diana Stakes, Flower Bowl Invitational Stakes
2008	Zoffany	c	Phoenix Stakes
2009	Dank	f	Beverly D. Stakes, Breeders' Cup Filly & Mare Turf
2009	Fallen For You	f	Coronation Stakes
2009	The Fugue	f	Nassau Stakes, Irish Champion Stakes
2010	Flintshire	c	Grand Prix de Paris, Hong Kong Vase, Sword Dancer Handicap x2, Manhattan Handicap
2010	Winsili	f	Nassau Stakes
2010	Grand Marshal	c	Sydney Cup
2011	Miss France	f	1000 Guineas
2011	We Are	f	Prix Saint-Alary, Prix de l'Opéra
2013	Queen's Trust	f	Breeders' Cup Filly & Mare Turf
2015	Juliet Foxtrot	f	Jenny Wiley Stakes
2015	With You	f	Prix Rothschild
2016	Blowout	f	First Lady Stakes
2016	Set Piece	c	Arlington Million

== Pedigree ==
Pedigree of Dansili (GB), bay stallion, 1996
Sire Danehill (USA) b. 1986	Danzig b. 1977	Northern Dancer b. 1961	Nearctic
Sire Danehill (USA) b. 1986	Danzig b. 1977	Northern Dancer b. 1961	Natalma*
Sire Danehill (USA) b. 1986	Danzig b. 1977	Pas de Nom b. 1968	Admiral's Voyage
Sire Danehill (USA) b. 1986	Danzig b. 1977	Pas de Nom b. 1968	Petitioner
Sire Danehill (USA) b. 1986	Razyana b. 1981	His Majesty b. 1968	Ribot
Sire Danehill (USA) b. 1986	Razyana b. 1981	His Majesty b. 1968	Flower Bowl
Sire Danehill (USA) b. 1986	Razyana b. 1981	Spring Adieu b. 1974	Buckpasser
Sire Danehill (USA) b. 1986	Razyana b. 1981	Spring Adieu b. 1974	Natalma*
Dam Hasili (GB) b. 1991	Kahyasi b. 1985	Ile de Bourbon b. 1975	Nijinsky
Dam Hasili (GB) b. 1991	Kahyasi b. 1985	Ile de Bourbon b. 1975	Roseliere
Dam Hasili (GB) b. 1991	Kahyasi b. 1985	Kadissya b. 1979	Blushing Groom
Dam Hasili (GB) b. 1991	Kahyasi b. 1985	Kadissya b. 1979	Kalkeen
Dam Hasili (GB) b. 1991	Kerali ch. 1984	High Line ch. 1966	High Hat
Dam Hasili (GB) b. 1991	Kerali ch. 1984	High Line ch. 1966	Time Call
Dam Hasili (GB) b. 1991	Kerali ch. 1984	Sookera b. 1975	Roberto
Dam Hasili (GB) b. 1991	Kerali ch. 1984	Sookera b. 1975	Irule

Note: b. = Bay, ch. = Chestnut

* Dansili is inbred 4x4 to Natalma. This means that the mare appears twice in the fourth generation of his pedigree.
