= Giofra =

British-bred Thoroughbred racehorse

- Sire: Dansili
- Grandsire: Danehill
- Dam: Gracefully
- Damsire: Orpen
- Sex: Mare
- Foaled: 11 March 2008
- Country: United Kingdom
- Colour: Bay
- Breeder: Haras de la Perelle
- Owner: Haras de la Perelle
- Trainer: Alain de Royer-Dupré
- Record: 13: 4-2-3
- Earnings: £1,029,169

Major wins
- Prix Casimir Delamarre (2011); Prix d'Harcourt (2012); Falmouth Stakes (2012)

Giofra (foaled 11 March 2008) is a British-bred, French-trained Thoroughbred racehorse and broodmare. Problems with leg injuries meant that she did not race until the autumn on her three-year-old season but she then won two of her three races in late 2011 including the Listed Prix Casimir Delamarre. In 2012 she emerged as a top-class racemare, taking the Prix d'Harcourt on her seasonal debut and recording her biggest win in the Group One Falmouth Stakes at Newmarket Racecourse in July. She also finished second in the Prix Ganay and the Hong Kong Cup and third in the Prix de l'Opéra. She failed to win as a five-year-old in 2013 but finished third in both the Dubai Duty Free and the Falmouth Stakes before being retired from racing.

== Background ==
Giofra is a bay mare with a white blaze bred and owned by the Haras de La Perelle. She was sired by Dansili, whose other progeny have included the leading middle distance winners Harbinger, The Fugue and Rail Link. Giofra's dam showed very good form as a two-year-old in 2003, winning three races including the Prestige Stakes, and has produced several other winners including the Ben Marshall Stakes winner Big Baz. She was a granddaughter of Guindilla, a half-sister to the Premio Parioli winners Gay Burslem and Crisos Il Monaco.

The filly was sent to race in France and was trained throughout her racing career by Alain de Royer-Dupré.

== Racing career ==
=== 2011: three-year-old season ===
Giofra did not race until the autumn of her three-year-old season and made no impact on her debut when she finished fifth in the Prix de l'Esperance at Moulins Racecourse on 2 September. A month later she recorded her first success when winning a minor race at Compiègne and was then moved up in class to contest the Listed Prix Casimir Delamarre over 1800 metres at Longchamp Racecourse on 28 October. Ridden by Maxime Guyon and starting at odds of 11.4/1 she took the lead 200 metres from the finish, accelerated clear of the field and won by three lengths from the German filly Acacalia.

=== 2012: four-year-old season ===
Giofra's 2012 debut saw her moved up in class for the Group Three Prix d'Harcourt over 2000 metres on 8 April at Longchamp and started second favourite behind her stablemate Vadamar, the winner of the Prix du Conseil de Paris. She raced in third before accelerating into the lead 300 metres from the finish and drew clear to win "comortably" by three lengths from Vadamar. Explaining the filly's delayed career, Alain de Royer-Dupré said "She had a problem with a foreleg, which meant we had to be patient with her, and she only ran three times last year but she showed when easily winning the Listed race here last October that she was Group class".

The filly was stepped up again three weeks later for the Group One Prix Ganay over 2100 metres at the same course. Racing on heavy ground she provided little challenge to the winner Cirrus des Aigles but took second place by two lengths from Reliable Man with Wigmore Hall (Jebel Hatta, Northern Dancer Stakes) a further eight lengths back in fourth.

After a break of two and a half months Giofra was sent to England to contest the Falmouth Stakes over one mile at Newmarket Racecourse on 13 July, with Christophe Soumillon taking over from Guyon. Golden Lilac started favourite ahead of Maybe and Joviality (Musidora Stakes, Windsor Forest Stakes), with Giofra next in the betting on 10/1 alongside Lay Time (Fortune Stakes). After being settled by Soumillon just behind the leaders, Giofra began to make progress in the last quarter mile, gained the advantage inside the final furlong and won by half a length from the three-year-old outsider Elusive Kate (ridden by Frankie Dettori) with Siyouma close behind in third. After the race Soumillon said "The pace wasn't that quick, I wouldn't say I wasn't happy but a quicker pace would have been better as she was a bit keen When I asked her to go at the two-furlong marker she was going very well and I knew I just had Frankie to beat." Alain de Royer-Dupré said "She's a great filly. I’ve known that for a long time, but she had a leg problem at the beginning of her three-year-old career and she is a new filly at four. She can go on any ground and I think she’ll be better at 10 furlongs. It was a risk to run her over a mile and we may now look at the Nassau Stakes for her".

In the following month the filly returned to France and started favourite for the Prix Jean Romanet over 2000 metres at Deauville Racecourse but finished sixth of the nine runners behind the subsequently disqualified Snow Fairy.

After another lengthy break, Giofra returned in October for the Prix de l'Opéra on heavy ground at Longchamp in which she finished third behind Ridasiyna and Izzi Top. Giofra ended her season in Hong Kong when she started at odds of 6/1 for the Hong Kong Cup over 2000 metres at Sha Tin Racecourse. She was restrained towards the rear of the field before making steady progress in the straight to finish second, a length behind the six-year-old gelding California Memory. The other beaten horses included Dan Excel, Military Attack, Carlton House and Saonois.

=== 2013: five-year-old season ===
On her first appearance at five, Giofra was sent to the United Arab Emirates for the Dubai Duty Free over 1800 metres at Meydan Racecourse on 30 March. Ridden by Guyon, she stayed on in the closing stages to finish third beaten one and three quarter lengths and three-quarters of a length by Sajhaa and The Apache. On her return to Europe she started favourite for the Prix Ganay but finished fourth behind the German colt Pastorius. On 12 July Giofra attempted to repeat her 2012 success in the Falmouth Stakes and finished third to Elusive Kate and Sky Lantern. On her final appearance Giofra ran poorly in the Prix Rothschild at Deauville on 28 July, finishing last of the twelve runners behind Elusive Kate. Her retirement was announced shortly afterwards, with Alain de Royer-Dupré commenting "She has left training and gone to stud to become a broodmare. I think the time is right".

== Breeding record ==
At the end of her racing career, Giofra became a broodmare for the Haras de la Perelle. In her first season she was scheduled to be covered by Frankel.

== Pedigree ==
Pedigree of Giofra (GB), bay mare, 2008
Sire Dansili (GB) 1996	Danehill (USA); 1986	Danzig	Northern Dancer
Sire Dansili (GB) 1996	Danehill (USA); 1986	Danzig	Pas de Nom
Sire Dansili (GB) 1996	Danehill (USA); 1986	Razyana	His Majesty
Sire Dansili (GB) 1996	Danehill (USA); 1986	Razyana	Spring Adieu
Sire Dansili (GB) 1996	Hasili (IRE); 1991	Kahyasi	Ile de Bourbon
Sire Dansili (GB) 1996	Hasili (IRE); 1991	Kahyasi	Kadissya
Sire Dansili (GB) 1996	Hasili (IRE); 1991	Kerali	High Line
Sire Dansili (GB) 1996	Hasili (IRE); 1991	Kerali	Sookera
Dam Gracefully (IRE) 2001	Orpen (USA); 1996	Lure	Danzig
Dam Gracefully (IRE) 2001	Orpen (USA); 1996	Lure	Endear
Dam Gracefully (IRE) 2001	Orpen (USA); 1996	Bonita Francita	Devil's Bag
Dam Gracefully (IRE) 2001	Orpen (USA); 1996	Bonita Francita	Raise the Standard
Dam Gracefully (IRE) 2001	Lady Taufan (IRE); 1989	Taufan	Stop The Music
Dam Gracefully (IRE) 2001	Lady Taufan (IRE); 1989	Taufan	Stolen Date
Dam Gracefully (IRE) 2001	Lady Taufan (IRE); 1989	Guindilla	Artaius
Dam Gracefully (IRE) 2001	Lady Taufan (IRE); 1989	Guindilla	Gayshuka (Family 6-e)

- Giofra was inbred 3 × 4 to Danzig, meaning that this stallion appears in both the third and fourth generations of her pedigree.
