= Cacique (horse) =

Irish-bred Thoroughbred racehorse

- Sire: Danehill
- Grandsire: Danzig
- Dam: Hasili
- Damsire: Kahyasi
- Sex: Stallion
- Foaled: 2001
- Country: Ireland
- Colour: Dark Bay
- Breeder: Juddmonte Farms
- Owner: Juddmonte Farms
- Trainer: André Fabre (Europe); Robert J. Frankel (USA)
- Record: 18: 7-5-1
- Earnings: £844,751 (equivalent)

Major wins
- Prix Daniel Wildenstein (2004); Prix Daphnis (2004); Prix du Chemin de Fer du Nord (2005); Manhattan Handicap (2006); Man o' War Stakes (2006)
- Last updated on July 12, 2008

Cacique (foaled 2001 in Ireland) is a retired Thoroughbred racehorse who competed in Europe and the United States. Bred and raced by Khalid Abdullah's Juddmonte Farms, Cacique is the son of international Champion sire Danehill. He is out of the mare Hasili, whose damsire, Kahyasi, won the 1988 Epsom and Irish Derbys. Cacique is a full-brother to Breeders' Cup winners Banks Hill and Intercontinental and to Grade One winner Champs Elysees and Grade One-placed and Leading sire in France Dansili.

== Racing in Europe ==
Ridden in his first six starts by American Hall of Fame jockey, Gary Stevens, Cacique was trained at the Chantilly stables of André Fabre. At age two, the colt made his racing debut in April 2004 at Saint-Cloud Racecourse with a win in the Prix Sica Boy in a race for unraced colts and geldings. The next month he won his second start, taking the Prix du Vert Galant at Longchamp Racecourse in Paris. He then had two seconds to Bago in the Group One Prix Jean Prat and Grand Prix de Paris. In July, Cacique won the Prix Daphnis then was sent to York Racecourse in England where he finished fourth to Sulamani in the Juddmonte International Stakes. In October, under jockey Christophe Soumillon, Cacique won the Prix Daniel Wildenstein at Longchamp.

At age four, Cacique began the 2005 racing season in May with a fifth-place finish in the Prix du Muguet at Saint-Cloud then was third in the Prix d'Ispahan before winning the Group 3 Prix du Chemin de Fer du Nord at Chantilly Racecourse. In September he finished seventh in the Prix du Moulin de Longchamp to the New Zealand-bred and Australian owned Champion, Starcraft.

== Turf racing in the United States ==
In May 2006, Cacique was sent to the United States where Hall of Fame trainer Bobby Frankel handled his conditioning. In his American debut, Cacique finished fourth in the Grade I Frank E. Kilroe Mile Handicap at Santa Anita Park in Arcadia, California. He followed this with a second to English Channel in the Grade I Turf Classic Stakes at Churchill Downs then won the Grade I Manhattan Handicap at Belmont Park. In his next outing, Cacique ran second to English Channel again, this time in the United Nations Stakes at Monmouth Park in New Jersey and then had another second to The Tin Man in the Arlington Million at Chicago's Arlington Park. Back at Belmont Park in New York, he won his second Grade I race there, capturing the Man o' War Stakes.

Ridden by jockey Edgar Prado in the final race of his career, Cacique finished tenth in an eleven-horse field behind winner Red Rocks in the Breeders' Cup Turf at Churchill Downs in Louisville, Kentucky.
