= The Fugue =

British-bred Thoroughbred racehorse

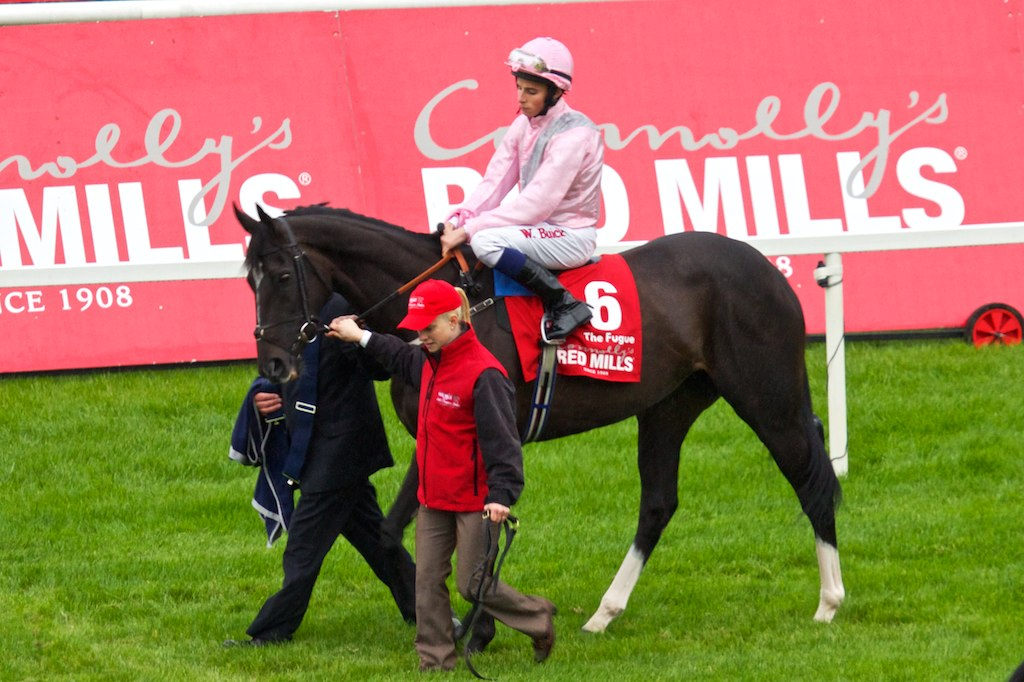
- The Fugue at Leopardstown in 2013.
- Sire: Dansili
- Grandsire: Danehill
- Dam: Twyla Tharp
- Damsire: Sadler's Wells
- Sex: Mare
- Foaled: 16 March 2009
- Country: United Kingdom
- Colour: Brown
- Breeder: Watership Down Stud
- Owner: Watership Down Stud; Andrew Lloyd Webber
- Trainer: John Gosden
- Record: 17: 6-4-3
- Earnings: £1,934,560

Major wins
- Musidora Stakes (2012); Nassau Stakes (2012); Yorkshire Oaks (2013); Irish Champion Stakes (2013); Prince of Wales's Stakes (2014)

Awards
- European Champion Three-Year-Old Filly (2012)

The Fugue (foaled 16 March 2009) is a British Thoroughbred racehorse who was named European Champion three-year-old filly at the Cartier Racing Awards. She won her only race as a two-year-old in 2011 before developing into one of the best fillies in Europe in the following season. She won the Musidora Stakes at York and the Nassau Stakes and was considered an unlucky loser in both the Oaks Stakes and the Breeders' Cup Filly & Mare Turf. In 2013, The Fugue won the Yorkshire Oaks before recording her biggest win in the Irish Champion Stakes. She then travelled to California to compete for a second time at the Breeders' Cup, finishing second in the Turf. As a five-year-old, she defeated a strong field to win the Prince of Wales's Stakes at Royal Ascot but was retired after suffering an injury in the Eclipse Stakes. She won six of her seventeen races, including four at Group One level.

== Background ==
The Fugue is a dark bay or brown filly with a white star and stripe and white socks on her hind legs bred by her owner, Andrew Lloyd Webber's Watership Down stud. She was sired by Dansili, whose other progeny include the leading middle-distance winners Harbinger and Rail Link. The Fugue's dam, Twyla Tharp, won only one minor race but was a half sister to Compton Admiral and Summoner. The filly was sent into training with John Gosden at his Clarehaven Stables at Newmarket.

== Racing career ==
=== 2011: two-year-old season ===
The Fugue made her first appearance in a seven-furlong maiden race at Newmarket Racecourse on 29 October 2011. Ridden by Robert Havlin, she was poorly supported in the betting and started at odds of 14/1 in a field of twelve two-year-old fillies. She started slowly and was towards the rear of the field in the early stages before making progress to take the lead inside the final furlong and win by 1 1/2 lengths from Salacia.

=== 2012: three-year-old season ===
The Fugue made her first appearance of 2012 in the 1000 Guineas over the Rowley Mile course at Newmarket on 6 May. Starting at odds of 22/1, she finished fourth of the sixteen runners behind Homecoming Queen. Two weeks later, the filly was then moved up in distance for the Musidora Stakes over 10 1/2 furlongs at York Racecourse. Ridden by William Buick, she took the lead two furlongs from the finish and drew clear of her five opponents to win "very readily" by 4 1/2 lengths.

On 1 June, The Fugue was made 11/4 favourite for the 234th running of the Oaks Stakes over 1 1/2 miles at Epsom Downs Racecourse. The filly fought Buick's attempts to restrain her in the early stages and turned into the straight in ninth place. She made steady progress in the closing stages to finish third of the twelve runners, beaten a neck and half a length by Was and Shirocco Star. The Daily Express described her as a "desperately unlucky" loser. On her next appearance, The Fugue started favourite for the Ribblesdale Stakes at Royal Ascot but proved no match for the Dermot Weld-trained filly Princess Highway, who beat her into second place by six lengths. In August, The Fugue was brought in distance to contest the Nassau Stakes over ten furlongs at Goodwood Racecourse in which her rivals included Was, Nahrain and her stable companion Izzi Top. With Buick being advised by Gosden to ride the 7/4 favourite Izzi Top, The Fugue was ridden by Richard Hughes and started at odds of 11/4. Held up towards the rear of the field, she accelerated in the straight to take the lead fifty yards from the finish and won by a length from Timepiece. Hughes said of The Fugue's performance that "the more I held her back, the more I knew she was going to really go." Nineteen days later, The Fugue moved back up in distance for the Yorkshire Oaks and finished second to the French-trained four-year-old Shareta, with Was in third and Shirocco Star in fourth.

On her final race of the season, The Fugue was sent to California for the Breeders' Cup Filly & Mare Turf at Santa Anita Park on 2 November. Ridden by Buick, she started the 11/8 favourite against ten opponents. Buick struggled to find racing room and had to switch the filly several times inside the closing stages before obtaining a clear run. The Fugue finished strongly but was an "unlucky" third behind Zagora and Marketing Mix.

=== 2013: four-year-old season ===
According to Gosden, The Fugue did not thrive during the cold winter and spring of 2012/2013, and she did not appear until June, when she took on a field including Camelot, Al Kazeem, Maxios and Red Cadeaux in the Prince of Wales's Stakes at Royal Ascot. Ridden by Buick, she made steady progress in the straight to finish third of the eleven runners behind Al Kazeem and Mukhadram. The Fugue met Al Kazeem and Mukhadram again in the Eclipse Stakes on 6 July and finished last of the seven runners. A subsequent examination suggested that the filly was suffering from a respiratory infection.

In August, The Fugue ran against all-female competition for the first time in 2013 when she started the 2/1 favourite for the Yorkshire Oaks. Buick sent her into the lead approaching the final furlong, and she drew away from the field to win by four lengths from the Irish-trained Venus de Milo. Gosden expressed his satisfaction with the filly's recovery and nominated the Prix de l'Arc de Triomphe and Breeders' Cup as future targets. On 7 September, The Fugue was sent to Ireland to contest the Irish Champion Stakes at Leopardstown Racecourse and started at odds of 4/1 in a field which included Al Kazeem, Trading Leather and Kingsbarns. Buick settled the filly in fourth place as Trading Leather set a strong pace, before moving to the outside to make a challenge in the straight. The Fugue took the lead approaching the final furlong and won by 1 1/4 lengths from Al Kazeem. After the race, Buick said: "She's one of the greats now. She's always been special and has always been a special one for everybody in the yard. She's very good and has arguably beaten the best around at the moment."

The Fugue made her final appearance of the year in the Breeders' Cup Turf at Santa Anita Park on 2 November. Ridden by Buick, she started the 6/4 favourite ahead of the leading North American turf performers Point of Entry, Little Mike, and Big Blue Kitten. The filly settled behind the leaders before moving up to take the lead in the straight. She was caught in the final strides and beaten half a length by the Irish-trained three-year-old Magician.

=== 2014: five-year-old season ===
In the spring of 2014, The Fugue was sent to the United Arab Emirates to contest the Dubai World Cup at Meydan Racecourse on 29 March but was rerouted to the shorter Dubai Duty Free on turf. Starting the 7/2 second favourite, she tracked the leaders but faded badly in the straight and finished eleventh of the thirteen runners, beaten twenty-six lengths by the winning favourite, Just A Way. On her return to Europe, The Fugue contested the Prince of Wales's Stakes at Royal Ascot on 18 June in which she started at odds of 11/2 in a very strong field including Treve, Magician, Mukhadram and Dank. The mare raced in mid division before moving up to track the leaders in the straight. She overtook Magician approaching the final furlong and won by 1 3/4 lengths with Treve a length away in third. The winning time of 2:01.90 was a new course record. After the race, Buick said, "She's been an absolute star for me and everyone back at the yard. She proved today what she can do against top-class horses. When she gets an uncomplicated run it's no bother to her. When she has a clear run at them she's lethal." On 5 July, The Fugue started 5/2 favourite to become the third female after Pebbles and Kooyonga to win the Eclipse Stakes. In a race in which many jockeys appeared to misjudge the pace, allowing the front-runners too much leeway, she finished sixth of the nine runners, six lengths behind the winner, Mukhadram.

The Fugue sustained an injury to her left foreleg during the Eclipse Stakes, and her retirement from racing was announced the following week. On the announcement of The Fugue's retirement, Lady Lloyd Webber said "It is impossible to describe how much fun The Fugue has given us over the last two and a half years... We feel incredibly privileged and lucky to have bred and owned such a magnificent filly and we look forward to her coming home to the stud for her second career".

== Assessment and honours ==
In the 2012 edition of the World Thoroughbred Racehorse Rankings, The Fugue was given a rating of 116, making her the 170th best racehorse in the world and the tenth-best three-year-old filly. At the Cartier Racing Awards, The Fugue was named Champion three-year-old filly, despite being rated below Valyra, Ridasiyna, Beauty Parlour, Great Heavens and Princess Highway in the official ratings. In the 2013 World's Best Racehorse Rankings The Fugue was rated the twenty-fourth best racehorse in the world and the best four-year-old filly.

== Pedigree ==
The Fugue was bred by Watership Down Stud (Simon Marsh).

Pedigree of The Fugue (GB), brown filly, 2009
Sire Dansili (GB) 1996	Danehill (IUSA); 1986	Danzig	Northern Dancer
Sire Dansili (GB) 1996	Danehill (IUSA); 1986	Danzig	Pas de Nom
Sire Dansili (GB) 1996	Danehill (IUSA); 1986	Razyana	His Majesty
Sire Dansili (GB) 1996	Danehill (IUSA); 1986	Razyana	Spring Adieu
Sire Dansili (GB) 1996	Hasili (IRE); 1991	Kahyasi	Ile de Bourbon
Sire Dansili (GB) 1996	Hasili (IRE); 1991	Kahyasi	Kadissya
Sire Dansili (GB) 1996	Hasili (IRE); 1991	Kerali	High Line
Sire Dansili (GB) 1996	Hasili (IRE); 1991	Kerali	Sookera
Dam Twyla Tharp (IRE) 2002	Sadler's Wells (USA); 1981	Northern Dancer	Nearctic
Dam Twyla Tharp (IRE) 2002	Sadler's Wells (USA); 1981	Northern Dancer	Natalma
Dam Twyla Tharp (IRE) 2002	Sadler's Wells (USA); 1981	Fairy Bridge	Bold Reason
Dam Twyla Tharp (IRE) 2002	Sadler's Wells (USA); 1981	Fairy Bridge	Special
Dam Twyla Tharp (IRE) 2002	Sumoto (GB); 1990	Mtoto	Busted
Dam Twyla Tharp (IRE) 2002	Sumoto (GB); 1990	Mtoto	Amazer
Dam Twyla Tharp (IRE) 2002	Sumoto (GB); 1990	Soemba	General Assembly
Dam Twyla Tharp (IRE) 2002	Sumoto (GB); 1990	Soemba	Seven Seas (Family 7-a)
