= Dank (horse) =

British-bred Thoroughbred racehorse

- Sire: Dansili
- Grandsire: Danehill
- Dam: Masskana
- Damsire: Darshaan
- Sex: Filly
- Foaled: 6 March 2009
- Country: United Kingdom
- Colour: Bay
- Breeder: London Thoroughbred Services
- Owner: James Wigan
- Trainer: Michael Stoute
- Record: 14:7-2-2
- Earnings: £1,414,530

Major wins
- Atalanta Stakes (2012); Dahlia Stakes (2013); Kilboy Estate Stakes (2013); Beverly D. Stakes (2013); Breeders' Cup Filly & Mare Turf (2013)

Awards
- American Champion Female Turf Horse (2013)

Dank (foaled 6 March 2009) is a British Thoroughbred racehorse. She showed useful form in Europe as a three and four-year-old, winning the Atalanta Stakes, Dahlia Stakes and Kilboy Estate Stakes. The filly showed improved form when campaigned in the United States in the second half of 2013, winning the Beverly D. Stakes and the Breeders' Cup Filly & Mare Turf and being voted American Champion Female Turf Horse.

== Background ==
Dank is a bay mare with a white blaze bred by London Thoroughbred Services. She was sired by Dansili, whose other progeny have included the leading middle distance winners Harbinger, The Fugue and Rail Link. Her dam Masskana, won 3 races in France and became a successful broodmare, producing several winners including Eagle Mountain. Throughout her racing career, Dank was owned by James Wigan and trained by Michael Stoute at his Freemason Lodge Stables in Newmarket, Suffolk.

== Racing career ==
=== 2011: two-year-old season ===
Dank made her racecourse debut in a seven furlong race at Newbury Racecourse on 16 September 2011. Ridden by Kieren Fallon, she started at odds of 9/2 and finished second, beaten two lengths by Hazel Lavery, a filly who went on to win the St. Simon Stakes.

=== 2012: three-year-old season ===
Dank won three of her six races as a three-year-old in 2012. On her seasonal debut she was ridden by Ryan Moore and recorded her first success when she won a maiden race over one mile at Kempton Park Racecourse in April. In her next two races, Dank competed in handicap races, finishing unplaced behind Bronze Angel at Doncaster Racecourse in May before winning over one mile at Ascot Racecourse in July. In August she was moved up to Listed class and finished second to Ladys First in the Dick Hern Fillies' Stakes at Haydock Park Racecourse. On 1 September, Dank and Ladys First met again in the Group Three Atalanta Stakes at Sandown Park Racecourse. Ridden by Richard Hughes, Dank started the 7/2 favourite in a field of sixteen and produced a strong late run to overtake Ladys First in the final strides and win by a neck. On her final appearance of the year, Dank finished fifth behind the four-year-old Chigun in the Rosemary Stakes at Newmarket

=== 2013: four-year-old season ===
Dank began her third season in the Group Three Dahlia Stakes over nine furlongs at Newmarket on 5 May. Moore positioned the filly just behind the leaders before taking the lead inside the final furlong and winning by a short head from Chigun. Dank's next race was the Duke of Cambridge Stakes at Royal Ascot in June, when she finished third behind the Irish filly Duntle and Ladys First. A month later, Dank was sent to Ireland for the Group Two Kilboy Estate Stakes over nine furlongs at the Curragh. Moore tracked the leaders before sending the filly into the lead inside the final quarter mile. Dank quickly opened up a clear advantage and wone by 1 3/4 lengths from the Aidan O'Brien trained Say.

In August, Dank was sent to the United States for the Grade I Beverly D. Stakes over 9 1/2 furlongs at Arlington Park. She started the 16/5 second choice in the betting behind the Canadian mare Marketing Mix. Dank raced behind the leaders before making progress on the outside approaching the final turn. She took the lead with a furlong to run and accelerated clear to win impressively by 4 1/4 lengths from Gifted Girl. The winning time of 1:53.38 equaled the record for the race. Dank returned to the United States for the Breeders' Cup Filly & Mare Turf over ten furlongs at Santa Anita Park and started 6/4 favourite against nine opponents. She started quickly but was settled by Moore and tracked the leaders before making her challenge in the straight. She took the lead approaching the final furlong and won by half a length from the French-trained four-year-old Romantica.

In January 2014 Dank was named American Champion Female Turf Horse at the Eclipse Awards taking 229 of the 245 votes, and also picking up some votes in the polls for Horse of the Year and Champion Older Female.

=== 2014: five-year-old season ===
In the spring of 2014, Dank was sent to the United Arab Emirates to contest the Dubai Duty Free at Meydan Racecourse on 29 March. She was restrained in the early stages before making progress in the straight and finished third behind the Japanese runner Just A Way and the South African-trained Vercingetorix. On her return to Europe she started at odds of 10/1 for the Prince of Wales's Stakes at Royal Ascot on 18 June. In a strongly-contested race she finished fifth of the eight runners behind The Fugue, Magician, Treve and Mukhadram.

Dank returned to Santa Anita to attempt a repeat of her 2013 success in the Breeders' Cup Filly & Mare Turf on 1 November. She started favourite but finished fourth of the ten runners behind Dayatthespa.

== Pedigree ==
Pedigree of Dank (GB), bay filly, 2009
Sire Dansili (GB) 1996	Danehill (IUSA); 1986	Danzig	Northern Dancer
Sire Dansili (GB) 1996	Danehill (IUSA); 1986	Danzig	Pas de Nom
Sire Dansili (GB) 1996	Danehill (IUSA); 1986	Razyana	His Majesty
Sire Dansili (GB) 1996	Danehill (IUSA); 1986	Razyana	Spring Adieu
Sire Dansili (GB) 1996	Hasili (IRE); 1991	Kahyasi	Ile de Bourbon
Sire Dansili (GB) 1996	Hasili (IRE); 1991	Kahyasi	Kadissya
Sire Dansili (GB) 1996	Hasili (IRE); 1991	Kerali	High Line
Sire Dansili (GB) 1996	Hasili (IRE); 1991	Kerali	Sookera
Dam Masskana (IRE) 1988	Darshaan (GB); 1981	Shirley Heights	Mill Reef
Dam Masskana (IRE) 1988	Darshaan (GB); 1981	Shirley Heights	Hardiemma
Dam Masskana (IRE) 1988	Darshaan (GB); 1981	Delsy	Abdos
Dam Masskana (IRE) 1988	Darshaan (GB); 1981	Delsy	Kelty
Dam Masskana (IRE) 1988	Masarika (IRE); 1981	Thatch	Forli
Dam Masskana (IRE) 1988	Masarika (IRE); 1981	Thatch	Thong
Dam Masskana (IRE) 1988	Masarika (IRE); 1981	Miss Melody	Tudor Melody
Dam Masskana (IRE) 1988	Masarika (IRE); 1981	Miss Melody	The Veil (Family 14-c)
