= In Italian =

- Sire: Dubawi (IRE)
- Grandsire: Dubai Millennium (GB)
- Dam: Florentina (AUS)
- Damsire: Redoute's Choice (AUS)
- Sex: Mare
- Foaled: 18 February 2018
- Country: Great Britain
- Color: Chestnut
- Breeder: Fairway Thoroughbreds
- Owner: Peter M. Brant
- Trainer: Chad C. Brown
- Record: 14 : 7-5-1
- Earnings: $2,195,433

Major wins
- Honey Fox Stakes (2022); Diana Stakes (2022); First Lady Stakes (2022); Jenny Wiley Stakes (2023); Just A Game Stakes (2023)
- Last updated on 5 November 2023

In Italian (foaled February 18, 2018) is a British-bred multiple Grade I turf winning Thoroughbred racehorse. Her Grade I wins include the Diana Stakes at Saratoga Race Course, the First Lady Stakes (2022) and Jenny Wiley Stakes (2023) at Keeneland.

== Background ==
In Italian is a chestnut mare who was bred in Great Britain by John Camilleri's Fairway Thoroughbreds, a daughter of Dubawi out of the Australian-bred Redoute's Choice mare Florentina, winner of the Group 3 Gold Coast Guineas at Gold Coast Racecourse, Surfers Paradise, Australia. She was sold to Peter Brant's White Birch Farm for 475,000 Guineas (~US$609,434) from Hazelwood Bloodstock's consignment to the 2019 Tattersalls October Yearling Sale. Florentina produced a colt foaled August 2, 2019 now named Spanish Empire (GB), sold for AU$1,800,000 at the Magic Millions Gold Coast yearling sale in 2021. Florentina has a 2-year-old by Kingman named Fiorenza (AUS) who has not started. The mare has not had a foal since 2020. John Camilleri has had much success breeding horses, including the Australian champion mare Winx (AUS). In Italian is a half sister to Group 2-placed winner Villa Carlotta (Street Cry). Dubawi stands as a breeding stallion at Godolphin's Dalham Hall Stud at a fee of £250,000 (since 2018).

In Italian is trained by Eclipse Award winning trainer Chad C. Brown.

== Racing career ==
=== 2021: three-year-old season ===
In Italian made her debut on March 28 in a maiden special weight event for three-year-old fillies and mares at Tampa Bay Downs in a field of eleven. Starting as the 7/5 favorite In Italian angled inside tracking off the second flight racing to the backstretch then switched off the inside nearing upper stretch, switched out sharply avoiding close quarters entering the lane and continued willingly to the end to close the gap to Fate Of Ophelia but fell short by a neck.

In Italian returned shortly to the track to break her maiden on May 8 in a maiden special weight event for fillies and mares that were three-year-olds and older at Belmont Park over the 1 1/16-mile distance. Ridden by Irad Ortiz Jr., In Italian led shortly after the break and set fractions of :24.03, :49.39, and 1:14.03. She maintained a clear advantage and appeared to be in a comfortable rhythm, pulling clear in the stretch to finish ahead by 3 1/2 lengths in a final time of 1:42.74 on a good course.

=== 2022: four-year-old season ===
After a length break of eight months In Italian was entered in Allowance event for entrants who had never won two races for fillies and mares that were four-year-olds and older at Tampa Bay Downs. Starting as the 1/2 odds-on favorite In Italian easily dispatched this field of six runners with a 4 1/2-length victory in a time of 1:34.64 on a firm turf course.

On March 5, In Italian started favorite at odds of 5/2 in a field of eleven in the one-mile Grade III Honey Fox Stakes for fillies and mares four and older. Breaking from post 9, In Italian was intent on being in front and got to the front of her rivals. She was tracked by Quinoa Tifah on the rail, fellow long shot Navratilova in the clear in third, and normally front-running GII winner Jouster settled in fourth. In Italian turned for home in front as Navratilova ranged up on the outside and Jouster came through an opening along the rail. Jockey Ortiz kept In Italian in hand and ahead of Navratilova, who was edged for second by a late surge from Wakanaka winning in a time 1:35.16 over a firm turf course.

On May 7, In Italian started in the Grade II Churchill Distaff Turf Mile Stakes at Churchill Downs. Starting at odds of 11/5 In Italian established a clear advantage in the early stages, maintained a loose lead while well in hand and staying in the three path around both turns, but met her stable-mate, Speak of the Devil (FR) bold bid entering the lane, battled with her through upper stretch, but proved no match, and safely held place to the finishing line beaten by 2 3/4 lengths.

In her first attempt in Grade I event In Italian was part of owners's Peter Brant three-horse entry in the Just a Game Stakes at Belmont Park. In Italian broke out then was quickly corrected by the rider. She showed speed on the outside of the leader Leggs Galore, while opening up on the rest of the field. Tracking the pace on the outside she ranged up three wide around the far turn, making a bid with three furlongs to run. In Italian took the lead at the quarter-pole in the upper stretch but lost the advantage to Regal Glory into the final furlong and weakening to finish third by 4 3/4 lengths.

On July 16, ran in the $500,000 Grade I Diana Stakes at Saratoga. In Italian was facing three other stablemate from Chad Brown's stable. In Italian bobbled a bit at the start while still breaking with the field, moved to the fore in the early going and built a clear margin into the first turn. She continued with a torrid pace setting first quarter fractions of in :22.45 seconds and the half in :45.83. In Italian was 1 1/2 lengths in front of Technical Analysis, who proved to be the only threat. After those quick fractions, In Italian, who started from post position six, covered six furlongs in 1:09.50. Joel Rosario never relinquished the lead despite setting the swift fractions in the 1 1/8-mile race over the firm course. Her time of 1:45.06 was a course record, breaking the mark of 1:45.22 set by Hard Not to Like in the 2015 Diana Stakes. Chad Brown scored his seventh win. No one has won more in the 84 editions of the race.

After a break of almost three months, on October 8 In Italian returned to face five other runners in the Grade I First Lady Stakes at Keeneland. Facing her stablemate Regal Glory, In Italian quickly took command of the race as the field passed the Keeneland stands for the first time in the one-mile event. She set an easy, uncontested lead under Joel Rosario with opening fractions of :23.37, :47, and 1:10.45. Regal Glory under Jose Ortiz Jr. gained on In Italian through the final turn, swung into the middle of the track at the top of the stretch, and were in a solid striking position. Regal Glory ran valiantly to close the gap but fell a length short of In Italian at the wire. The final time was 1:33.22. Owner Peter Brant captured the exacta while Chad Brown won his fifth consecutive First Lady.

On November 5, In Italian raced in the GI Breeders' Cup Filly & Mare Turf at Keeneland. Jockey Joel Rosario wasted no time in moving to the lead and opening a clear advantage through a quarter-mile and set fractional times of :22.82 for the quarter-mile :46.38 for a half-mile and 1:10.31 for six furlongs. In Italian opened a 2 1/2-length lead in the stretch with Lady Speightspeare briefly providing a threat after she got through, but it was Tuesday that proved the bigger concern. After creeping within striking distance in the far turn, Tuesday launched a five-wide drive and quickened once straightened for the drive and defeating In Italian by one length on the line.

== Statistics ==
Date	Distance	Race	Grade	Track	Odds	Field	Finish	Winning Time	Winning (Losing) Margin	Jockey	Ref
2021 – three-year-old season
Mar 28, 2021	1 1/16 miles	Maiden Special Weight		Tampa Bay Downs	1.40*	11	2	1:44.36	(neck)	Samy Camacho	
May 8, 2021	1 1/16 miles	Maiden Special Weight		Belmont Park	1.25*	11	1	1:42.74	3 1/2 lengths	Irad Ortiz Jr.	
2022 – four-year-old season
Jan 12, 2022	1 mile	Allowance		Tampa Bay Downs	0.50*	6	1	1:34.64	4 1/4 lengths	Samy Camacho	
Mar 5, 2022	abt. 1 mile	Honey Fox Stakes	III	Gulfstream Park	2.70	11	1	1:35.49	1 1/4 lengths	Irad Ortiz Jr.	
May 7, 2022	1 mile	Churchill Distaff Turf Mile	II	Churchill Downs	2.20	6	2	1:37.47	(2 3/4 lengths)	Irad Ortiz Jr.	
Jun 11, 2022	1 mile	Just a Game Stakes	I	Belmont Park	1.40	5	3	1:32.00	(4 3/4 lengths)	Irad Ortiz Jr.	
Jul 16, 2022	1 1/8 miles	Diana Stakes	I	Saratoga	8.30	6	1	1:45.06 (Note: In Italian (GB) set a new track record for the 1 1/8-mile distance on the turf at Saratoga)	1 1/2 lengths	Jose L. Ortiz	
Oct 8, 2022	1 mile	First Lady Stakes	I	Keeneland	2.87	6	1	1:33.22	1 length	Joel Rosario	
Nov 5, 2022	1 3/16 miles	Breeders' Cup Filly & Mare Turf	I	Keeneland	2.96	12	2	1:51.88	(1 length)	Joel Rosario	
2023 – five-year-old season
Apr 15, 2023	1 1/16 miles	Jenny Wiley Stakes	I	Keeneland	0.75*	6	1	1:39.71	3 lengths	Irad Ortiz Jr.	
Jun 9, 2023	1 mile	Just a Game Stakes	I	Belmont Park	0.20*	5	1	1:34.00	3 3/4 lengths	Irad Ortiz Jr.	
Jul 15, 2023	1 1/8 miles	Diana Stakes	I	Saratoga	0.35	5	2	1:48.33	(nose)	Irad Ortiz Jr.	
Oct 7, 2023	1 mile	First Lady Stakes	I	Keeneland	0.45*	8	2	1:33.70	(head)	Joel Rosario	
Nov 4, 2023	1 1/4 miles	Breeders' Cup Filly & Mare Turf	I	Santa Anita	3.30	12	5	1:59.06	(2 3/4 lengths)	Joel Rosario	

Legend:
Turf Dirt
Notes:
An (*) asterisk after the odds means In Italian was the post-time favorite.

== Pedigree ==
Pedigree of In Italian (GB), chestnut mare, March 18, 2018
Sire Dubawi (IRE) (2002)	Dubai Millennium (GB) (1996)	Seeking the Gold (1985)	Mr. Prospector (1970)
Sire Dubawi (IRE) (2002)	Dubai Millennium (GB) (1996)	Seeking the Gold (1985)	Con Game (1974)
Sire Dubawi (IRE) (2002)	Dubai Millennium (GB) (1996)	Colorado Dancer (IRE) (1986)	Shareef Dancer (1980)
Sire Dubawi (IRE) (2002)	Dubai Millennium (GB) (1996)	Colorado Dancer (IRE) (1986)	Fall Aspen (1976)
Sire Dubawi (IRE) (2002)	Zomaradah (GB) (1995)	Deploy (GB) (1987)	Shirley Heights (GB) (1975)
Sire Dubawi (IRE) (2002)	Zomaradah (GB) (1995)	Deploy (GB) (1987)	Slightly Dangerous (1979)
Sire Dubawi (IRE) (2002)	Zomaradah (GB) (1995)	Jawaher (IRE) (1989)	Dancing Brave (1983)
Sire Dubawi (IRE) (2002)	Zomaradah (GB) (1995)	Jawaher (IRE) (1989)	High Tern (IRE) (1982)
Dam Florentina (AUS) (2008)	Redoute's Choice (AUS) (1996)	Danehill (1986)	Danzig (1977)
Dam Florentina (AUS) (2008)	Redoute's Choice (AUS) (1996)	Danehill (1986)	Razyana (1981)
Dam Florentina (AUS) (2008)	Redoute's Choice (AUS) (1996)	Shantha's Choice (AUS) (1992)	Canny Lad (AUS) (1987)
Dam Florentina (AUS) (2008)	Redoute's Choice (AUS) (1996)	Shantha's Choice (AUS) (1992)	Dancing Show (1983)
Dam Florentina (AUS) (2008)	Celebria (AUS) (2001)	Peintre Celebre (1994)	Nureyev (1977)
Dam Florentina (AUS) (2008)	Celebria (AUS) (2001)	Peintre Celebre (1994)	Peinture Bleue (1987)
Dam Florentina (AUS) (2008)	Celebria (AUS) (2001)	Twyla (AUS) (1995)	Danehill (1986)
Dam Florentina (AUS) (2008)	Celebria (AUS) (2001)	Twyla (AUS) (1995)	Dancing Show (1983) (family 8-f)

In Italian (GB) is inbred 3d × 4d to Danehill
In Italian (GB) is inbred 4d × 4d to Dancing Show
