= Golden Lilac =

Irish-bred Thoroughbred racehorse

- Sire: Galileo
- Grandsire: Sadler's Wells
- Dam: Grey Lilas
- Damsire: Danehill
- Sex: Filly
- Foaled: 25 April 2008
- Country: Ireland
- Colour: Bay
- Breeder: Ammerland Verwaltung Gmbh
- Owner: Gestut Ammerland
- Trainer: André Fabre
- Record: 10: 6-1-1

Major wins
- Prix de la Grotte (2011); Poule d'Essai des Pouliches (2011); Prix de Diane (2011); Prix d'Ispahan (2012)

Awards
- Champion French three-year-old filly

Golden Lilac is an Irish-bred, French-trained Thoroughbred racehorse. She won her first six races including the Poule d'Essai des Pouliches and the Prix de Diane as a three-year-old in 2011. In May 2012, she defeated Cirrus des Aigles to win the Prix d'Ispahan.

== Background ==
Golden Lilac is a bay filly with a narrow white blaze. She was bred in Ireland by the German-based Ammerland Stud. Golden Lilac was sent into training with André Fabre and has been ridden in most of her races by Maxime Guyon. She was sired by The Derby winner Galileo out of Grey Lilas, a mare who won the Prix du Moulin in 2004.

== Racing career ==
=== 2010: two-year-old season ===
Golden Lilac made her first appearance in a maiden race at Saint-Cloud on 8 September. She started favourite and won by a neck from Elusive Eria. She returned to the same track in October to win a minor stakes race by two lengths from Rosehill Dew.

=== 2011: three-year-old season ===
Golden Lilac made her three-year-old debut in the Group Three Prix de la Grotte at Longchamp in April. She was settled in fourth place by Guyon before taking the lead in the closing stages and winning "comfortably" by one and a half lengths. In winning the Prix de la Grotte, she emulated her dam, Grey Lilas, who took the same race in 2004. Three weeks later, the filly returned to Longchamp for the Group One Poule d'Essai des Pouliches, the French equivalent of Britain's 1000 Guineas. Ridden by Olivier Peslier (Guyon was unavailable because of a suspension) she went clear in the straight and won by three lengths from Glorious Sight. Her performance was described as "dominating" by The Blood-Horse correspondent.

In June, Golden Lilac was matched against the highly regarded Galikova in the Prix de Diane over 2100m at Longchamp. As in some of earlier races, Golden Lilac pulled hard in the early stages before being settled by Guyon. She took the lead in the straight and held off the challenge of Galikova to win by a length. After a break of more than two months, Golden Lilac returned to the racecourse in the Prix Guillaume d'Ornano at Deauville. She started favourite but lost her unbeaten record, finishing third to Galikova. Golden Lilac did run again in 2011.

At the end of the year, Golden Lilac was voted Champion three-year-old filly by French journalists. In the 2011 World Thoroughbred Racehorse Rankings, Golden Lilac was ranked the eighth best three-year-old filly in the world.

=== 2012: four-year-old season ===
Golden Lilac made her first appearance in more than nine months when she contested the Prix d'Ispahan at Longchamp on 27 May. Starting at odds of 4.3/1, she pulled hard in the early stages before being moved up by Guyon to take the lead in the closing stages with a "potent turn of foot". She ran on strongly to win by three quarters of a length from the odds on favourite Cirrus des Aigles. After the race, Fabre described the win as "probably her best performance" and mentioned the Prince of Wales's Stakes and the Prix Jacques Le Marois as possible future targets.

Golden Lilac made her next appearance in the Falmouth Stakes at Newmarket on 13 July. She started 10/11 favourite but ran poorly, finishing ninth of the ten runners behind Giofra. Fabre claimed that Golden Lilac was unsuited by the soft ground. Golden Lilac returned to France for the Prix Rothschild at Deauville for which she started 7/10 favourite. She finished second behind the English-trained three-year-old Elusive Kate, who led from the start and won by one and three quarter lengths. Golden Lilac ran again at Deauville in August when she raced against colts in the Prix Jacques Le Marois. She finished seventh of the eleven runners behind Excelebration. Golden Lilac's connections were considering a run in the Prix de l'Arc de Triomphe when she fell ill in September and was retired to stud.

== Pedigree ==
Pedigree of Golden Lilac (IRE), bay filly, 2008
Sire Galileo (IRE) 1998	Sadler's Wells; 1981	Northern Dancer	Nearctic
Sire Galileo (IRE) 1998	Sadler's Wells; 1981	Northern Dancer	Natalma
Sire Galileo (IRE) 1998	Sadler's Wells; 1981	Fairy Bridge	Bold Reason
Sire Galileo (IRE) 1998	Sadler's Wells; 1981	Fairy Bridge	Special
Sire Galileo (IRE) 1998	Urban Sea; 1989	Miswaki	Mr. Prospector
Sire Galileo (IRE) 1998	Urban Sea; 1989	Miswaki	Hopespringeternal
Sire Galileo (IRE) 1998	Urban Sea; 1989	Allegretta	Lombard
Sire Galileo (IRE) 1998	Urban Sea; 1989	Allegretta	Anatevka
Dam Grey Lilas (IRE) 2001	Danehill; 1986	Danzig	Northern Dancer
Dam Grey Lilas (IRE) 2001	Danehill; 1986	Danzig	Pas de Nom
Dam Grey Lilas (IRE) 2001	Danehill; 1986	Razyana	His Majesty
Dam Grey Lilas (IRE) 2001	Danehill; 1986	Razyana	Spring Adieu
Dam Grey Lilas (IRE) 2001	Kenmist; 1994	Kenmare	Kalamoun
Dam Grey Lilas (IRE) 2001	Kenmist; 1994	Kenmare	Belle of Ireland
Dam Grey Lilas (IRE) 2001	Kenmist; 1994	Mistral's Collette	Simply Great
Dam Grey Lilas (IRE) 2001	Kenmist; 1994	Mistral's Collette	Kitty's Sister (Family: 1-e)
