= Honey Fox Stakes =

- Class: Grade III
- Location: Gulfstream Park; Hallandale Beach, Florida, United States
- Inaugurated: 1984
- Race type: Thoroughbred – Flat racing – Turf
- Website: Gulfstream Park

Race information
- Distance: One mile
- Surface: Turf
- Track: Left-handed
- Qualification: fillies and mares, four years old and older
- Weight: 124 lbs with allowances
- Purse: US$150,000 (since 2022)

The Honey Fox Stakes is a Grade III American Thoroughbred horse race for fillies and mares that are four years or older held over a distance of 1 mile on the turf scheduled annually in late February or early March at Gulfstream Park, Hallandale Beach, Florida. The event currently carries a purse of $150,000.

== History ==
The event was inaugurated on 25 May 1984 as the Honey Fox Stakes for three-year-old fillies over a distance of 1 1/16 miles and pitted the two divisional winners Oakbrook Lady, Delta Mary from the newly created Herecomesthebride Stakes which was held 16 days earlier. Oakbrook Lady was victorious over Delta Mary with longshot Lady Mellody a distant third in a time of 1:43 flat.

The event was named after the winning mare Honey Fox who won thirteen races in her career including the Grade II Orchid Handicap.

In 1985 Gulfstream Park introduced a new race which was a predecessor to today's named event, known as the Joe Namath Stakes which continued the conditions established in the inaugural running in 1984 with a shorter distance of one mile. This race was named after the New York Jets Super Bowl winning quarterback Joe Namath. In 1986 the event's conditions were changed to handicap which also proceeded name the event as the Joe Namath Handicap. Gulfstream Park acknowledges that the Honey Fox Stakes had its beginnings from the Joe Namath Handicap.

However, the name Honey Fox was used in events and a branch continued in 1985 and with the last running in 1991.

Between 1985 and 1989 the event was held in split divisions.

The event was upgraded to Grade III in 1994.

The event was renamed to the Honey Fox Handicap in 2000 and between 2013 and 2017 it was run as a Grade II race.

In 2009, the race was changed from a handicap to an stakes allowance weight basis and rename to the original name of the event - Honey Fox Stakes.

== Records ==
Speed record:

- 1 mile 1:32.77 – Special Wan (IRE) (2025)
- 1 1/16 miles 1:38.31 – Wend (2016)

Margins:

- 12 lengths – One Fine Lady (1985)

Most wins:

- 2 – One Fine Lady (1985, 1986)
- 2 – Fieldy (IRE) (1989, 1990)
- 2 – Centre Court (2013, 2014)
- 2 – Celestine (2017, 2018)

Most wins by a jockey

- 7 – Jerry D. Bailey (1990, 1994, 1996, 1997, 1999, 2000, 2004)

Most wins by a trainer

- 8 – William I. Mott (1996, 1999, 2000, 2004, 2005, 2006, 2015, 2016)

== Winners ==
Year	Winner	Age	Jockey	Trainer	Owner	Distance	Time	Purse	Grade	Ref
Honey Fox Stakes
2026	Lush Lips (GB)	4	Tyler Gaffalione	Brendan P. Walsh	Dixiana Farms	1 mile	1:33.71	$150,000	III	
2025	Special Wan (IRE)	5	Luis Saez	Brendan P. Walsh	Team Valor International & Steven Rocco	1 mile	1:32.77	$150,000	III	
2024	Chili Flag (FR)	5	Irad Ortiz Jr.	Chad C. Brown	Madaket Stables, Michael Dubb & Michael E. Kisber	1 mile	1:32.78	$150,000	III	
2023	Faith in Humanity (FR)	4	Joel Rosario	Chad C. Brown	Klaravich Stables	1 mile	1:34.12	$150,000	III	
2022	In Italian (GB)	4	Irad Ortiz Jr.	Chad C. Brown	Peter M. Brant	abt. 1 mile	1:35.16	$150,000	III	
2021	Got Stormy	6	Tyler Gaffalione	Mark E. Casse	My Racehorse CA & Spendthrift Farm	1 mile	1:35.52	$125,000	III	
2020	Getmotherarose	4	Junior Alvarado	Thomas M. Bush	Mary Abeel Sullivan Trust	1 mile	1:34.73	$150,000	III	
2019	Precieuse (IRE)	4	Javier Castellano	Chad C. Brown	Peter M. Brant	1 mile	1:34.14	$150,000	III	
2018	Lull	4	José L. Ortiz	Christophe Clement	Claiborne Farm & Adele Dilschneider	1 mile	1:33.14	$250,000	III	
2017	Celestine	5	José L. Ortiz	Christophe Clement	Moyglare Stud Farm	1 mile	1:35.19	$300,000	II	
2016	Celestine	4	Junior Alvarado	William I. Mott	Phaedrus Flights	1 mile	1:36.09	$300,000	II	
2015	Lady Lara (IRE)	4	Junior Alvarado	William I. Mott	Swettenham Stud	1 mile	1:34.03	$300,000	II	
2014	Centre Court	5	Julien R. Leparoux	George R. Arnold II	G. Watts Humphrey Jr.	1 mile	1:36.61	$200,000	II	
2013	Centre Court	4	Julien R. Leparoux	George R. Arnold II	G. Watts Humphrey Jr.	1 mile	1:33.18	$150,000	II	
2012	Tapitsfly	5	Julien R. Leparoux	Dale L. Romans	Frank L. Jones Jr	1 mile	1:34.23	$150,000	II	
2011	Never Retreat	6	Julien R. Leparoux	Chris M. Block	Team Block	1 mile	1:34.24	$100,000	III	
2010	Wasted Tears	5	Cornelio H. Velasquez	Bart B. Evans	Bart B. Evans	1 mile	1:33.81	$100,000	III	
2009	I Lost My Choo	4	Jose Lezcano	Philip M. Serpe	Flying Zee Stable (Carl Lizza, Jr. &Herbert Hochreiter)	1 mile	1:33.40	$100,000	III	
2008	Race not held									
Honey Fox Handicap
2007	Wait a While	4	John R. Velazquez	Todd A. Pletcher	William S. Farish III & W. Temple Webber Jr.	1 1/16 miles	1:39.37	$100,000	III	
2006	Wend	5	Edgar S. Prado	William I. Mott	Claiborne Farm	1 1/16 miles	1:38.31	$100,000	III	
2005	Sand Springs	5	Jerry D. Bailey	William I. Mott	Swettenham Stud	1 1/16 miles	1:38.41	$100,000	III	
2004	Delmonico Cat	5	Jerry D. Bailey	William I. Mott	Pam & Martin Wygod	1 1/16 miles	1:41.30	$100,000	III	
2003	San Dare	5	Mark Guidry	Rick Hiles	David G. Mounts	1 1/16 miles	1:46.19	$100,000	III	
2002	Batique	6	Jorge F. Chavez	Michael R. Matz	Helen K. Groves	abt. 1 1/16 miles	1:49.32	$100,000	III	
2001	Spook Express (SAF)	7	Mike E. Smith	Thomas J. Skiffington	Kinloch Enterprises	1 mile	1:35.60	$100,000	III	
Joe Namath Handicap
2000	Dominique's Joy	5	Jerry D. Bailey	William I. Mott	Madeleine A. Paulson	1 1/16 miles	1:39.91	$75,000	III	
1999	Colcon	6	Jerry D. Bailey	William I. Mott	Cavallix	1 1/16 miles	1:41.71	$75,000	III	
1998	Parade Queen	4	Pat Day	Neil J. Howard	William S. Farish III & Edward J. Hudson Jr.	1 1/16 miles	1:42.10	$75,000	III	
1997	Rare Blend	4	Jerry D. Bailey	Claude R. McGaughey III	H. Joseph Allen	1 1/16 miles	1:44.28	$75,000	III	On dirt
1996	Apolda	5	Jerry D. Bailey	William I. Mott	Allen E. Paulson	1 1/16 miles	1:41.55	$75,000	III	
1995	Regal Joy	4	Dave Penna	Larry Bates	Margulies Stable	1 1/16 miles	1:44.79	$60,000	III	On dirt
1994	Sambacarioca	5	Jerry D. Bailey	Martin D. Wolfson	Team Valor Stable	1 1/16 miles	1:43.41	$60,000	III	On dirt
1993	Hero's Love	5	Earlie Fires	Daniel J. Vella	Frank Stronach	1 1/16 miles	1:42.90	$50,000	Listed	
1992	Explosive Kate	5	Dave Penna	Louis M. Goldfine	Richard L. Duchossois	1 1/16 miles	1:43.37	$50,000	Listed	
1991	Vigorous Lady	5	Michael Andre Lee	Joseph P. Bertolino	Monarch Stable	1 mile & 70 yards	1:40.30	$50,000	Listed	On dirt
1990	Fieldy (IRE)	7	Jerry D. Bailey	Thomas J. Skiffington	Fernwood Stable	abt. 1 mile	1:37.60	$50,000	Listed	
1989	Vana Turns	4	Randy Romero	George R. Arnold II	Glencrest Farm	1 mile	1:35.80	$50,725	Listed	Division 1
1989	Fieldy (IRE)	6	Craig Perret	Thomas J. Skiffington	Fernwood Stable	1 mile	1:36.00	$50,225	Listed	Division 2
1988	Allegedum	5	Ángel Cordero Jr.	Thomas J. Skiffington	Barbara Phillips	1 mile	1:36.00	$51,525	Listed	Division 1
1988	Shaughnessy Road	4	José A. Vélez Jr.	Carl A. Nafzger	Genter Frances A Stable	1 mile	1:35.20	$51,025	Listed	Division 2
1987	Small Virtue	4	Jacinto Vásquez	H. Allen Jerkens	Tayhill Stable	1 mile	1:37.00	$46,025	Listed	Division 1
1987	Top Socialite	5	Craig Perret	Alan E. Goldberg	Betty Marcus	1 mile	1:37.40	$46,525	Listed	Division 2
1986	Gypsy Prayer	5	Robert Neal Lester	James D. Frederiksen	Troy H. Seale	7 furlongs	1:22.00	$49,975	Listed	Division 1
1986	One Fine Lady	4	José A. Vélez Jr.	Al W. Hinson	Larry Foggle	7 furlongs	1:21.00	$49,475	Listed	Division 2
Joe Namath Stakes
1985	One Fine Lady	3	Victor H. Molina	Al W. Hinson	Larry Foggle	abt. 1 mile	1:35.60	$32,095	Listed	Division 1
1985	Affirmance	3	Eddie Maple	Frank Martin Sr.	Harbor View Farm	abt. 1 mile	1:34.60	$32,695	Listed	Division 2

=== Honey Fox (1984–1991) ===
Year	Winner	Age	Jockey	Trainer	Owner	Distance	Time	Purse	Grade	Ref
Honey Fox Handicap
1991	Be Exclusive (IRE)	5	Kendra Taylor	Jonathan E. Sheppard	Augustin Stable	1 1/16 miles	1:40.97	$50,000	Listed	
1990	Leave It Be	5	Herbert Castillo	Mark C. Dumas	Liberty D Stables	1 1/16 miles	1:47.00	$40,000		
Honey Fox Stakes
1989	View Of Royalty	5	Julio Pezua	J. David Braddy	Donald R. Dizney	1 1/2 miles	2:32.00	$34,950		
1988	Munchkin Michelle	4	Steve Gaffalione	Margie Allen	Black Chip Stable	1 1/2 miles	2:29.80	$38,130		
1987	Easter Mary	3	Julio Pezua	Hubert Hine	William A. Wood & Estate of Arnold Funger	1 1/16 miles	1:43.20	$40,845		
Honey Fox Purse
1986	Connie's Taj	4	Jose A. Santos	Manuel A. Estavez	Manuel A. Estavez & Grassymeade Stables	abt. 1 1/16 miles	1:45.20	$25,000		
1985	Warglo	5	Robert Woodhouse	James Fogarty	Kenmare Farm	abt. 1 mile	1:38.00	$26,500		
Honey Fox Stakes
1984	Oakbrook Lady	3	Alex Solis	Reed M. Combest	Oakbrook Stable	1 1/16 miles	1:43.00	$33,425		3YOF only

Legend:
Turf Dirt

== See also ==
List of American and Canadian Graded races
