= First Lady Stakes =

- Class: Grade I
- Location: Keeneland Race Course, Lexington, Kentucky United States
- Inaugurated: 1998
- Race type: Thoroughbred - Flat racing
- Website: www.keeneland.com

Race information
- Distance: 1 mile
- Surface: Turf
- Track: Left-handed
- Qualification: Fillies & Mares, three-years-old and older
- Weight: Weight for Age; 4-year-olds and up: 125 lbs. 3-year-olds: 121 lbs.
- Purse: $800,000 (2025)
- Bonuses: Win and You're In Breeders' Cup Filly & Mare Turf

The First Lady Stakes is a Grade I American thoroughbred horse race for fillies & mares, age three and older over a distance of one mile on the turf held annually in October at Keeneland Race Course in Lexington, Kentucky during the fall meeting.

== History ==
The race was first run on October 16, 1998, as the First Lady Stakes at a distance of 1 3/16 miles and was sponsored by Vinery Farm located in Lexington.

In 2000, WinStar Farm became the race's sponsor from then through 2005 and it was renamed the Galaxy Stakes. Also that year the event was classified Grade III by the American Graded Stakes Committee who upgraded it as a Grade II race the following year.

In 2005 the distance of the event was decreased to its present distance of one mile.

In 2006, the name of the event was reverted to its inaugural title.

The First Lady Stakes is a steppingstone to the Breeders' Cup Filly & Mare Turf. In 2000, Perfect Sting ran second in this race but went on to win that year's inaugural edition of the Breeders' Cup Filly & Mare Turf. In 2005, Intercontinental won this race and the ensuing Breeders' Cup and was crowned US Champion Female Turf Horse. The 2008 winner Forever Together also went on to win the Breeders' Cup Filly & Mare Turf and was crowned US Champion Female Turf Horse. The 2015 winner Tepin went on to defeat the males in the Breeders' Cup Mile and also was crowned US Champion Female Turf Horse. The British bred Uni was the most recent winner to claim the Breeders' Cup Mile after winning this event in 2019.

== Records ==
Speed record:

- 1:32.87 - Uni (GB) (2019)

Margins:

- 7 1/4 lengths – Bien Nicole (2003)

Most wins

- 2 - Uni (GB) (2019, 2020)
- 2 - Gina Romantica (2023, 2024)

Most wins by an owner

- 4 - Peter M. Brant (2021, 2022, 2023, 2024)

Most wins by a jockey

- 5 - Julien Leparoux (2006, 2008, 2011, 2013, 2015)

Most wins by a trainer

- 8 - Chad C. Brown (2014, 2018, 2019, 2020, 2021, 2022, 2023, 2024)

== Winners ==
Year	Winner	Age	Jockey	Trainer	Owner	Distance	Time	Purse	Grade	Ref
First Lady Stakes
2026	Classic Q	4	John R. Velazquez	Mark E. Casse	Gary Barber, Blue Crevalle Racing and Eclipse Thoroughbred Partners	1 mile	1:35.89	$800,000	I	
2025	Simply in Front	4	Ben Curtis	Eddie Kennelly	Colebrook Farms	1 mile	1:34.76	$776,750	I	
2024	Gina Romantica	5	Jose L. Ortiz	Chad C. Brown	Peter M. Brant	1 mile	1:33.80	$728,750	I	
2023	Gina Romantica	4	Tyler Gaffalione	Chad C. Brown	Peter M. Brant	1 mile	1:33.70	$724,688	I	
2022	In Italian (GB)	4	Joel Rosario	Chad C. Brown	Peter M. Brant	1 mile	1:33.22	$683,837	I	
2021	Blowout (GB)	5	Flavien Prat	Chad C. Brown	Peter M. Brant	1 mile	1:34.86	$400,000	I	
2020	Uni (GB)	6	Joel Rosario	Chad C. Brown	Michael Dubb, Head Of Plains Partners, Robert LaPenta & Bethlehem Stable	1 mile	1:34.90	$343,000	I	
2019	Uni (GB)	5	Joel Rosario	Chad C. Brown	Michael Dubb, Head Of Plains Partners, Robert LaPenta & Bethlehem Stable	1 mile	1:32.87	$400,000	I	
2018	A Raving Beauty (GER)	5	John R. Velazquez	Chad C. Brown	Michael Dubb, Madaket Stables & Bethlehem Stables	1 mile	1:37.78	$400,000	I	
2017	Zipessa	5	Joe Bravo	Michael Stidham	Empyrean Stables	1 mile	1:36.99	$400,000	I	
2016	Photo Call (IRE)	5	Kent J. Desormeaux	Todd A. Pletcher	Teresa Viola Racing	1 mile	1:35.62	$400,000	I	
2015	Tepin	4	Julien R. Leparoux	Mark E. Casse	Robert E. Masterson	1 mile	1:37.04	$400,000	I	
2014	Dayatthespa	5	John R. Velazquez	Chad C. Brown	Jerry & Ronald Frankel, Steve Laymon & Bradley Thoroughbreds	1 mile	1:35.21	$400,000	I	
2013	Better Lucky	4	Julien R. Leparoux	Thomas Albertrani	Godolphin Racing	1 mile	1:39.78	$400,000	I	
2012	Tapitsfly	5	Jose Lezcano	Dale L. Romans	Frank L. Jones Jr.	1 mile	1:35.44	$350,000	I	
2011	Never Retreat	6	Julien R. Leparoux	Chris M. Block	Team Block	1 mile	1:34.08	$350,000	I	
2010	Proviso (GB)	5	Mike E. Smith	William I. Mott	Juddmonte Farms	1 mile	1:34.81	$400,000	I	
2009	Diamondrella (GB)	5	Rajiv Maragh	Angel A. Penna Jr.	IEAH Stables	1 mile	1:38.66	$400,000	I	
2008	Forever Together	4	Julien R. Leparoux	Jonathan E. Sheppard	Augustin Stable	1 mile	1:35.00	$400,000	I	
2007	Vacare	4	Corey Nakatani	Christophe Clement	Sarah & Jon Kelly	1 mile	1:35.85	$432,000	II	
2006	Gorella (FR)	4	Julien R. Leparoux	Patrick L. Biancone	Martin S. Schwartz	1 mile	1:34.14	$400,000	II	
Galaxy Stakes
2005	Intercontinental (GB)	5	Jerry D. Bailey	Robert J. Frankel	Juddmonte Farms	1 mile	1:37.40	$400,000	II	
2004	Stay Forever	7	Eddie Castro	Martin D. Wolfson	Santa Cruz Ranch	1 3/16 miles	1:57.08	$500,000	II	
2003	Bien Nicole	5	Donald R. Pettinger	Donnie K. Von Hemel	Kristine & John Richter	1 3/16 miles	1:55.87	$500,000	II	
2002	Owsley	4	Edgar S. Prado	Randy Schulhofer	Arthur B. Hancock III	1 3/16 miles	1:56.72	$544,500	II	
2001	Spook Express (SAF)	7	Mike E. Smith	Thomas J. Skiffington	Robert & Janet Aron	1 3/16 miles	1:54.24	$563,500	II	
2000	Tout Charmant	4	Chris McCarron	Ron McAnally	Stonerside Stable	1 3/16 miles	1:54.60	$554,000	III	
First Lady Stakes
1999	Happyanunoit (NZ)	4	Brice Blanc	Robert J. Frankel	Amerman Racing Stables	1 3/16 miles	1:53.80	$558,500	Listed	
1998	Witchful Thinking	4	Chris McCarron	Niall M. O'Callaghan	Leslie R. Grimm	1 3/16 miles	1:54.20	$273,250	Listed	

Legend:
Turf

== See also ==
- List of American and Canadian Graded races
