= Jenny Wiley Stakes =

- Class: Grade I
- Location: Keeneland Racecourse; Lexington, Kentucky, United States
- Inaugurated: 1989
- Race type: Thoroughbred – Flat racing
- Website: Keeneland

Race information
- Distance: 1 1/16 miles (8.5 furlongs)
- Surface: Turf
- Track: Left-handed
- Qualification: Fillies & Mares, four-year-olds & up
- Weight: 123 lbs with allowances
- Purse: US$500,000 (since 2022)

The Jenny Wiley Stakes is a Grade I American Thoroughbred horse race for fillies and Mares, age four and older over a distance of one and one-sixteenth miles on the turf held annually in early April at Keeneland Race Course, Lexington, Kentucky during the spring meeting.

== History ==
The Jenny Wiley Stakes is named for Jenny Wiley, a pregnant pioneer woman captured in Kentucky by Native Americans in 1789 and who escaped after almost a year in captivity.

The event was inaugurated on 17 April 1989 and was won by Native Mommy, ridden by Craig Perret to a 3/4 length margin in a time of 1:43 3/5 over the 1 1/16 miles distance.

The event in 1995 was upgraded to Grade III. It was upgrade to Grade II and to the elite status of Grade I in 2012.

The quality of runners has improved to reflect the classification of the event. Dual winner British bred Intercontinental trained by Hall of Fame trainer Robert J. Frankel won this race in 2005. The mare later that year won the Breeders' Cup Filly & Mare Turf at Belmont Park and was awarded US Champion Female Turf Horse. Also the US Champion Female Turf Horse of 2015, Tepin won this event as a short priced favorite in 2016 after winning the Breeders' Cup Filly & Mare Turf in 2015.

The Jenny Wiley Stakes was sponsored by Coolmore America Ashford Stud since 2016 until 2021 which was reflected in the name of the event.

== Records ==
Speed record:

- 1 1/16 miles: 1:39.02 – Rushing Fall (2020)

Margins

- 5 lengths – Tepin (2016)

Most wins

- 2 – Rushing Fall (2019, 2020)
- 2 – Intercontinental (GB) (2004, 2005)

Most wins by an owner

- 5 – Juddmonte Farms (2002, 2004, 2005, 2021, 2026)

Most wins by a jockey

- 5 – Jerry D. Bailey (1996, 1999, 2003, 2004, 2005)

Most wins by a trainer

- 8 – Chad C. Brown (2015, 2018, 2019, 2020, 2022, 2023, 2024, 2026)

== Winners ==
| Year | Winner | Age | Jockey | Trainer | Owner | Distance | Time | Purse | Grade | Ref |
|---|---|---|---|---|---|---|---|---|---|---|
| 2026 | Expensive Queen (IRE) | 5 | Luis Saez | Brendan P. Walsh | Farfellow Farms | 1 1/16 miles | 1:40.98 | $581,713 | I | Dead heat |
| 2026 | Segesta | 5 | Flavien Prat | Chad C. Brown | Juddmonte Farms | 1 1/16 miles | 1:40.98 | $581,713 | I | Dead heat |
| 2025 | Choisya (GB) | 5 | Luis Saez | Simon Crisford | Rabbah Bloodstock | 1 1/16 miles | 1:42.01 | $521,657 | I | |
| 2024 | Beaute Cachee (FR) | 5 | Frankie Dettori | Chad C. Brown | Michael Dubb, Madaket Stables LLC & Louis Lazzinnaro | 1 1/16 miles | 1:42.90 | $511,250 | I | |
| 2023 | In Italian (GB) | 5 | Irad Ortiz Jr. | Chad C. Brown | Peter M. Brant | 1 1/16 miles | 1:39.71 | $511,125 | I | |
| 2022 | Regal Glory | 6 | Jose L. Ortiz | Chad C. Brown | Peter M. Brant | 1 1/16 miles | 1:40.97 | $479,000 | I | |
| 2021 | Juliet Foxtrot (GB) | 6 | Tyler Gaffalione | Brad H. Cox | Juddmonte Farms | 1 1/16 miles | 1:44.51 | $300,000 | I | |
| 2020 | Rushing Fall | 5 | Javier Castellano | Chad C. Brown | e Five Racing Thoroughbreds | 1 1/16 miles | 1:39.02 | $350,000 | I | |
| 2019 | Rushing Fall | 4 | Javier Castellano | Chad C. Brown | e Five Racing Thoroughbreds | 1 1/16 miles | 1:42.77 | $350,000 | I | |
| 2018 | Sistercharlie (IRE) | 4 | John R. Velazquez | Chad C. Brown | Peter M. Brant | 1 1/16 miles | 1:41.41 | $350,000 | I | |
| 2017 | Dickinson | 5 | Paco Lopez | Kiaran P. McLaughlin | Godolphin Racing | 1 1/16 miles | 1:41.98 | $350,000 | I | |
| 2016 | Tepin | 5 | Julien R. Leparoux | Mark E. Casse | Robert Masterson | 1 1/16 miles | 1:40.53 | $350,000 | I | |
| 2015 | Ball Dancing | 4 | Javier Castellano | Chad C. Brown | William S. Farish III & Steve F. Mooney | 1 1/16 miles | 1:43.08 | $300,000 | I | |
| 2014 | Hard Not to Like | 5 | Javier Castellano | Michael R. Matz | Hillsbrook Farms | 1 1/16 miles | 1:42.38 | $300,000 | I | |
| 2013 | Centre Court | 4 | Julien R. Leparoux | George R. Arnold II | G. Watts Humphrey Jr. | 1 1/16 miles | 1:41.73 | $298,500 | I | |
| 2012 | Daisy Devine | 4 | James Graham | Andrew McKeever | James Miller | 1 1/16 miles | 1:43.21 | $300,000 | I | |
| 2011 | Never Retreat | 6 | Shaun Bridgmohan | Chris M. Block | Team Block | 1 1/16 miles | 1:44.72 | $200,000 | II | |
| 2010 | Wasted Tears | 5 | Rajiv Maragh | Bart B. Evans | Bart Evans | 1 1/16 miles | 1:40.86 | $200,000 | II | |
| 2009 | Forever Together | 5 | Julien R. Leparoux | Jonathan E. Sheppard | Augustin Stable | 1 1/16 miles | 1:46.93 | $200,000 | II | |
| 2008 | Rutherienne | 4 | Garrett K. Gomez | Christophe Clement | Virginia Kraft Payson | 1 1/16 miles | 1:44.76 | $200,000 | II | |
| 2007 | My Typhoon (IRE) | 5 | Eddie Castro | William I. Mott | Live Oak Plantation Racing | 1 1/16 miles | 1:43.37 | $200,000 | II | Off turf |
| 2006 | Wend | 5 | Edgar S. Prado | William I. Mott | Claiborne Farm | 1 1/16 miles | 1:41.34 | $200,000 | II | |
| 2005 | Intercontinental (GB) | 5 | Jerry D. Bailey | Robert J. Frankel | Juddmonte Farms | 1 1/16 miles | 1:41.89 | $200,000 | III | |
| 2004 | Intercontinental (GB) | 4 | Jerry D. Bailey | Robert J. Frankel | Juddmonte Farms | 1 1/16 miles | 1:41.41 | $110,300 | III | |
| 2003 | Sea of Showers | 4 | Jerry D. Bailey | Robert J. Frankel | Flaxman Holdings | 1 1/16 miles | 1:41.89 | $113,300 | III | |
| 2002 | Tates Creek | 4 | Kent J. Desormeaux | Robert J. Frankel | Juddmonte Farms | 1 1/16 miles | 1:42.27 | $113,600 | III | |
| 2001 | Penny's Gold | 4 | José A. Santos | Christophe Clement | Overbrook Farm | 1 1/16 miles | 1:40.93 | $113,900 | III | |
| 2000 | Astra | 4 | Corey Nakatani | Simon Bray | Allen E. Paulson | 1 1/16 miles | 1:42.40 | $112,400 | III | |
| 1999 | Pleasant Temper | 5 | Jerry D. Bailey | W. Elliott Walden | Mark H. Stanley | 1 1/16 miles | 1:40.80 | $113,300 | III | |
| 1998 | Maxzene | 5 | José A. Santos | Thomas J. Skiffington | Fusao Sekiguchi | 1 1/16 miles | 1:42.80 | $111,600 | III | |
| 1997 | Thrilling Day (GB) | 4 | Willie Martinez | Michael H. Bell | Bloomsbury Stud | 1 1/16 miles | 1:41.00 | $110,700 | III | |
| 1996 | Apolda | 5 | Jerry D. Bailey | William I. Mott | Allen E. Paulson | 1 1/16 miles | 1:40.60 | $111,300 | III | |
| 1995 | Romy | 4 | Francisco C. Torres | Moises R. Yanez | W. L. Pacella, J. Rizza & R. Schwed | 1 1/16 miles | 1:43.20 | $84,150 | III | |
| 1994 | Misspitch | 4 | Mike E. Smith | William I. Mott | Mathew K. Firestone | 1 1/16 miles | 1:43.80 | $55,900 | Listed | |
| 1993 | Lady Blessington (FR) | 5 | Pat Day | Mark A. Hennig | Team Valor | 1 1/16 miles | 1:42.40 | $56,200 | Listed | |
| 1992 | Indian Fashion | 5 | José A. Santos | James E. Baker | Candie A. Wigginton & R. Hoeweler | 1 1/16 miles | 1:41.20 | $56,175 | Listed | |
| 1991 | Foresta | 5 | Ángel Cordero Jr. | Thomas K. Bohannan | Loblolly Stable | abt. 1 1/16 miles | 1:43.80 | $57,100 | Listed | |
| 1990 | Regal Wonder | 6 | Ricardo D. Lopez | James E. Day | Sam-Son Farm | 1 1/16 miles | 1:46.20 | $55,560 | | |
| 1989 | Native Mommy | 6 | Craig Perret | Joseph H. Pierce Jr. | Richard D. Irwin | 1 1/16 miles | 1:43.60 | $55,175 | | |

Legend:
Turf All Weather Track

== See also ==
- List of American and Canadian Graded races
