= Sookera =

Thoroughbred racehorse trained in Ireland

- Sire: Roberto
- Grandsire: Hail To Reason
- Dam: Irule
- Damsire: Young Emperor
- Sex: Mare
- Foaled: 18 May 1975
- Country: United States
- Colour: Brown
- Breeder: British Bloodstock Agency and Robert Sangster
- Owner: Robert Sangster
- Trainer: Dermot Weld
- Record: 5: 3-2-0

Major wins
- Chesham Stakes (1977); Cheveley Park Stakes (1977)

Awards
- Timeform rating 117 (1977)

Sookera (18 May 1975 – 2004) was an American-bred Irish-trained Thoroughbred racehorse and broodmare. Racing only as a two-year-old in 1977, she won three times and finished second twice, from five races. After winning on her debut and finishing second on her next appearance, she recorded her first major success when defeating male opponents in the Chesham Stakes. She returned from a late summer break and finished second in the Moyglare Stud Stakes before winning the Group One Cheveley Park Stakes. Sookera never ran again but became a very successful broodmare. She produced several winners including So Factual and is the female-line ancestor of numerous major winners including Dansili, Leroidesanimaux, Banks Hill and Intercontinental.

== Background ==
Sookera was a "strong, good-quartered" brown mare with a white blaze bred in Kentucky by the British businessman Robert Sangster in association with the British Bloodstock Agency. She was sired by Roberto, an American-bred horse who won the Epsom Derby and the inaugural Benson and Hedges Gold Cup as a three-year-old in 1972. At stud, Roberto sired many important winners including Sunshine Forever, Touching Wood, Real Shadai, At Talaq, Lear Fan, Kris S. and Dynaformer. Her dam, Irule, was a granddaughter of Itsabet, an American broodmare whose other descendants have included the dam of Giant's Causeway

As a yearling, Sookera was offered for sale at Saratoga but failed to make her reserve price of $20,000. She was sent to race in Europe where she was trained by Dermot Weld.

== Racing career ==
=== 1977: two-year-old season ===
Sookera made her racing debut on 17 March, the opening day of the 1977 Irish flat racing season, when she won the Castrol Stakes over five furlongs on soft ground at Phoenix Park Racecourse. At the time she was still two months away from her actual second birthday. On her next appearance over six furlongs at the Curragh Racecourse in May she was beaten a length by the Vincent O'Brien-trained Turkish Treasure, to whom she was conceding seven pounds in weight. The winner went on to take the Cherry Hinton Stakes and the Park Stakes. In June the filly was sent to England and was matched against male opposition in the Chesham Stakes over six furlongs at Royal Ascot. She recorded her first major win as took the lead a furlong out and won decisively by one and a half lengths from Tumbledownwind, a colt who went on to win the Gimcrack Stakes.

After a break of almost ten weeks, Sookera returned for the Moyglare Stud Stakes at the Curragh in late August and was made the even money favourite. She appeared slightly short of full fitness in the pre-race paddock and finished second, beaten one and three quarter lengths by the winner Ridaness. On her final appearance of the season, Sookera was sent back to England for the Cheveley Park Stakes (then the only Group One race in Britain restricted to juvenile fillies) at Newmarket Racecourse in October. Ridden by Wally Swinburn, she started at odds of 3/1 in a field which also included Noiritza (National Stakes), Fair Salinia, Petty Purse (Star Stakes), Shapina (runner-up in the Cherry Hinton Stakes) and Smarten Up. Sookera took the lead a furlong out and looked likely to win easily but had to be pushed out by Swinburn in the closing stages to hold off Petty Purse and Fair Salinia by three quarters of a length and a head.

Sookera was expected to be a contender for the British Classic Races in 1978 but never ran competitively again after her win at Newmarket.

== Assessment ==
There was no International Classification of European two-year-olds in 1977: the official handicappers of Britain, Ireland and France compiled separate rankings for horses which competed in those countries. In the Irish Free Handicap Sookera was the top-rated filly, equal with Fairy Bridge. In the British Free Handicap she was rated second, five pounds behind Cherry Hinton. The independent Timeform organisation gave her a rating of 117, eight pounds behind their top-rated juvenile filly Cherry Hinton.

== Breeding record ==
Sookera was retired from racing to become a broodmare for Sangster before being sold to Juddmonte Farms. She produced at least 11 foals and 8 winners between 1980 and 1996. The best of her offspring on the track was the sprinter So Factual but her most enduring influence has come through the descendants of her daughter Kerali.

- Resooka, a brown filly, foaled in 1980, sired by Godswalk. Unraced.
- Field Dancer, bay filly, 1981, by Northfields. Won six races.
- Ricura, bay filly, 1982, by Hello Gorgeous. Won one race.
- Kerali, chestnut filly, 1984, by High Line. Won one race. Dam of Kerawi (Christmas Hurdle), Hasili and Dissemble (dam of Leroidesanimaux)
- Durzi, bay colt (later gelded), 1985, by High Line. Won races on the amateur point-to-point circuit.
- Krameria, bay filly, 1986, by Kris. Won one race.
- Soothfast, brown colt, 1989, by Riverman. Won two Hurdle races.
- So Factual, brown colt, 1990, by Known Fact. Won seven races including Cork and Orrery Stakes and Nunthorpe Stakes.
- Safety Factor, brown colt, 1991, by Known Fact. Failed to win in three races.
- Coincidence, brown colt, 1992, by Sovereign Dancer. Unraced.
- Sweet Fact, chestnut colt, 1994, by Known Fact. Unraced.
- Bold Fact, brown colt, 1995, by Known Fact. Won seven races including July Stakes.
- Keralba, bay filly, 1996, by Sheikh Albadou. Unplaced on only start.

Sookera died in 2004.

== Pedigree ==
Pedigree of Sookera (USA), brown mare, 1975
| Sire Roberto (USA) 1969 | Hail To Reason (USA); 1958 | Turn-To | Royal Charger |
| Sire Roberto (USA) 1969 | Hail To Reason (USA); 1958 | Turn-To | Source Sucree |
| Sire Roberto (USA) 1969 | Hail To Reason (USA); 1958 | Nothirdchance | Blue Swords |
| Sire Roberto (USA) 1969 | Hail To Reason (USA); 1958 | Nothirdchance | Galla Colors |
| Sire Roberto (USA) 1969 | Bramalea (USA); 1959 | Nashua | Nasrullah |
| Sire Roberto (USA) 1969 | Bramalea (USA); 1959 | Nashua | Segula |
| Sire Roberto (USA) 1969 | Bramalea (USA); 1959 | Rarelea | Bull Lea |
| Sire Roberto (USA) 1969 | Bramalea (USA); 1959 | Rarelea | Bleebok |
| Dam Irule (USA) 1968 | Young Emperor (GB); 1963 | Grey Sovereign | Nasrullah |
| Dam Irule (USA) 1968 | Young Emperor (GB); 1963 | Grey Sovereign | Kong |
| Dam Irule (USA) 1968 | Young Emperor (GB); 1963 | Young Empress | Petition |
| Dam Irule (USA) 1968 | Young Emperor (GB); 1963 | Young Empress | Jennifer |
| Dam Irule (USA) 1968 | Iaround (USA); 1961 | Round Table | Princequillo |
| Dam Irule (USA) 1968 | Iaround (USA); 1961 | Round Table | Knights Daughter |
| Dam Irule (USA) 1968 | Iaround (USA); 1961 | Itsabet | Heliopolis |
| Dam Irule (USA) 1968 | Iaround (USA); 1961 | Itsabet | Jayjean (Family 11) |
