= Diana Stakes =

- Class: Grade I
- Location: Saratoga Race Course; Saratoga Springs, New York, United States
- Inaugurated: 1939
- Race type: Thoroughbred – Flat racing
- Website: Saratoga Race Course at the NYRA

Race information
- Distance: 1 1/8 miles (9 furlongs)
- Surface: Turf
- Track: Left-handed
- Qualification: Fillies & Mares 3-years-old & Up
- Weight: Handicap
- Purse: $500,000

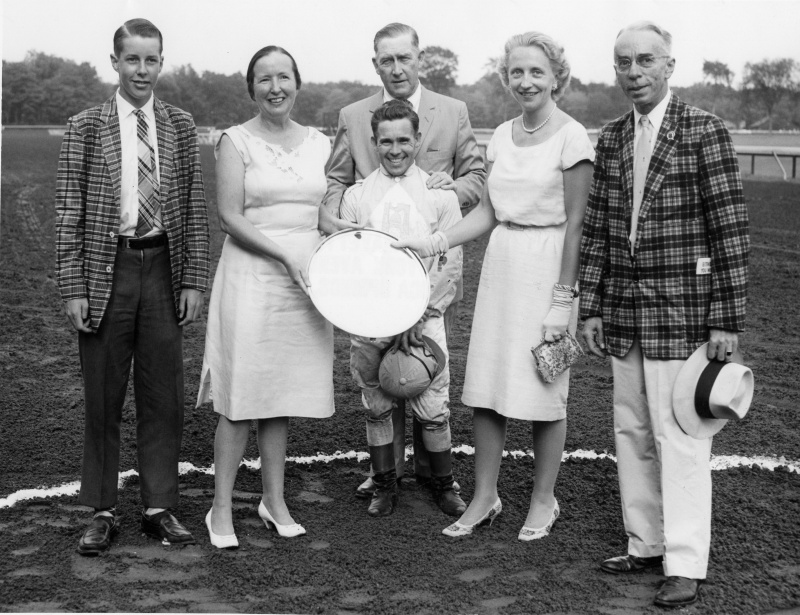
Margaret Truman Daniel (second from right) stands with jockey Eldon Nelson (center holding trophy), who rode the horse Tempted to victory in the 1959 Diana Handicap at Saratoga Springs Race Track

The Diana Stakes is an American Thoroughbred horse race. Named for the mythological goddess Diana, the race is run each year at Saratoga Race Course in Saratoga Springs, New York. Inaugurated in 1939, it is open to fillies and mares age three and up willing to race the one and one-eighth miles on the turf. The race is a Grade I with a current purse of $500,000. It became a Grade I race in 2003.

From inception in 1939 to 1973, the race was run on Saratoga Race Course's dirt track. Because of large fields, it was split into two divisions in 1973, 1982, and 1983. The race was run at Belmont Park from 1943 to 1945 due to travel restrictions during World War II.

== Records ==
Speed: (at current 1 1/8 miles on grass)

- 1:45.06 – In Italian (GB) (2022)

Wins:

- 2 – Miss Grillo (1946, 1947)
- 2 – Searching (1956, 1958)
- 2 – Tempted (1959, 1960)
- 2 – Shuvee (1970, 1971)
- 2 – Hush Dear (1982, 1983)
- 2 – Glowing Honor (1988, 1989)
- 2 – Forever Together (2008, 2009)
- 2 – Sistercharlie (2018, 2019)
- 2 - Whitebeam (2023, 2024)

Most wins by an owner:

- 6 – Rokeby Stable (1967, 1968, 1976, 1984, 1988, 1989)

Most wins by a jockey:

- 6 – John Velazquez (1995, 2001, 2005, 2015, 2018, 2019)

Most wins by a trainer:

- 11 – Chad Brown (2011, 2016, 2017, 2018, 2019, 2020, 2022, 2023, 2024, 2025, 2026)

== Winners ==
Year	Winner	Age	Jockey	Trainer	Owner	Time	Grade
2026	Kathynmarissa	5	Jose Ortiz	Chad Brown	Michael Dubb & Michael J. Caruso	1:51.42	I
2025	Excellent Truth (IRE)	5	Flavien Prat	Chad Brown	Resolute Racing	1:47.37	I
2024	Whitebeam (GB)	5	Flavien Prat	Chad Brown	Juddmonte	1:48.14	I
2023	Whitebeam (GB)	4	Flavien Prat	Chad Brown	Juddmonte	1:48.33	I
2022	In Italian (GB)	4	Joel Rosario	Chad Brown	Peter M. Brant	1:45.06	I
2021	Althiqa	4	Manny Franco	Charlie Appleby	Godolphin	1:47.65	I
2020	Rushing Fall	5	Javier Castellano	Chad Brown	e Five Racing Thoroughbreds	1:45.88	I
2019	Sistercharlie	5	John Velazquez	Chad Brown	Peter M. Brant	1:47.93	I
2018	Sistercharlie	4	John Velazquez	Chad Brown	Peter M. Brant	1:46.26	I
2017	Lady Eli	5	Irad Ortiz Jr.	Chad Brown	Sheep Pond Partners	1:46.17	I
2016	Dacita	5	Irad Ortiz Jr.	Chad Brown	Sheep Pond Partners / Bradley Thoroughbreds	1:46.25	I
2015	Hard Not to Like	5	John Velazquez	Christophe Clement	Speedway Stable	1:45.22	I
2014	Somali Lemonade	5	Luis Saez	Michael R. Matz	Caroline A. Forgason	1:48.51	I
2013	Laughing (IRE)	5	Jose Lezcano	Alan E. Goldberg	Richard Santulli	1:47.24	I
2012	Winter Memories	4	Javier Castellano	James J. Toner	Phillips Racing	1:48.50	I
2011	Zagora	4	Javier Castellano	Chad Brown	Martin S. Schwartz	1:49.19	I
2010	Proviso	5	Mike E. Smith	William I. Mott	Juddmonte Farms	1:47.04	I
2009	Forever Together	5	Julien Leparoux	Jonathan Sheppard	Augustin Stable	1:48.21	I
2008	Forever Together	4	Julien Leparoux	Jonathan Sheppard	Augustin Stable	1:46.52	I
2007	My Typhoon	5	Eddie Castro	William I. Mott	Live Oak Plantation	1:46:47	I
2006	Angara	5	Fernando Jara	William I. Mott	Sangster Family Stable	1:49.20	I
2005	Sand Springs	5	John Velazquez	William I. Mott	Sangster Family Stable	1:46.91	I
2004	Wonder Again	5	Edgar Prado	James J. Toner	Phillips Racing Partners	1:48.99	I
2003	Voodoo Dancer	5	Corey Nakatani	Christophe Clement	Green Hills Farm	1:47.98	I
2002	Tates Creek	4	Jerry Bailey	Robert J. Frankel	Juddmonte Farms	1:48.00	II
2001	Starine	4	John Velazquez	Robert J. Frankel	Robert J. Frankel	1:46.17	II
2000	Perfect Sting	4	Jerry Bailey	Joseph Orseno	Stronach Stable	1:47.01	II
1999	Heritage Of Gold	4	Shane Sellers	Thomas Amoss	Jack Garey	1:45.93	II
1998	Memories of Silver	5	Jerry Bailey	James J. Toner	Joan Phillips	1:46.14	II
1997	Rumpipumpy	4	José A. Santos	Christophe Clement	Gaye MacRae	1:48.59	II
1996	Electric Society	5	Mike E. Smith	John C. Kimmel	Gary A. Tanaka	1:46.56	II
1995	Perfect Arc	3	John Velazquez	Angel Penna Jr.	Brazil Stables	1:46.85	II
1994	Via Borghese	5	José A. Santos	Angel Penna Jr.	Malcolm E. Parrish	1:52.01	II
1993	Ratings	5	Julie Krone	Jonathan Sheppard	Augustin Stable	1:49.80	II
1992	Plenty of Grace	5	Herb McCauley	John M. Veitch	Darby Dan Farm	1:46.66	II
1991	Christiecat	4	Jean-Luc Samyn	Patrick J. Kelly	Fox Ridge Farm	1:47.66	II
1990	Foresta	4	Ángel Cordero Jr.	Thomas Bohannan	Loblolly Stable	1:48.40	II
1989	Glowing Honor	4	Jerry Bailey	MacKenzie Miller	Rokeby Stable	1:50.20	II
1988	Glowing Honor	3	Pat Day	MacKenzie Miller	Rokeby Stable	1:49.40	II
1987	Bailrullah	5	Jean Cruguet	William W. Wright	Laura Leigh Stable	1:46.20	II
1986	Duty Dance	4	Jean Cruguet	C. R. McGaughey III	Ogden Mills Phipps	1:49.80	II
1985	Lake Country	4	Jeffrey Fell	Donnie Walker	D. F. Prowse / D. A. McIntosh	1:48.40	II
1984	Wild Applause	3	Walter Guerra	MacKenzie Miller	Rokeby Stable	1:48.20	II
1983	Hush Dear	5	Jacinto Vásquez	J. Elliott Burch	C. V. Whitney	1:48.40	II
1983	Geraldine's Store	4	Jean-Luc Samyn	Philip G. Johnson	Thomas P. Whitney	1:47.20	II
1982	Hush Dear	4	Eric Beitia	J. Elliott Burch	C. V. Whitney	1:47.40	II
1982	If Winter Comes	4	Eric Beitia	Mary Cotter	E. W. Clucas Jr.	1:47.40	II
1981	De La Rose	3	Eddie Maple	Woody Stephens	Henryk de Kwiatkowski	1:50.60	II
1980	Just A Game	4	Don Brumfield	David A. Whiteley	P. Brant & J. Allen	1:49.00	II
1979	Pearl Necklace	5	Jeffrey Fell	Roger Laurin	Reginald N. Webster	1:48.80	II
1978	Waya	4	Ángel Cordero Jr.	Angel Penna Sr.	Daniel Wildenstein	1:45.40	II
1977	Javamine	4	Ángel Cordero Jr.	MacKenzie Miller	Cragwood Stables	1:48.40	II
1976	Glowing Tribute	3	Ron Turcotte	J. Elliott Burch	Rokeby Stable	1:47.60	II
1975	Heloise	4	Michael Venezia	John A. Nerud	Tartan Stable	1:47.40	II
1974	Fairway Flyer	5	Eddie Belmonte	H. Allen Jerkens	William Floyd	1:47.20	II
1973	Lightning Lucy	3	Jorge Velásquez	John Rigione	Vee-Nine Stable	1:46.60	II
1973	Cathy Baby	4	Eddie Belmonte	William Corbellini	Mereworth Farm	1:46.80	II
1972	Blessing Angelica	4	Eddie Belmonte	H. Allen Jerkens	Hobeau Farm	1:49.80	
1971	Shuvee	5	Ron Turcotte	Willard C. Freeman	Anne Minor Stone	1:50.60	
1970	Shuvee	4	Ron Turcotte	Willard C. Freeman	Anne Minor Stone	1:49.60	
1969	Gamely	5	Eddie Belmonte	James W. Maloney	William Haggin Perry	1:49.60	
1968	Green Glade *	4	Kenneth Knapp	J. Elliott Burch	Rokeby Stable	1:49.60	
1967	Prides Profile	4	Manuel Ycaza	J. Elliott Burch	Rokeby Stable	1:49.60	
1966	Open Fire	5	Frank Lovato	Virgil W. Raines	Brandywine Stable	1:48.80	
1965	Steeple Jill	4	John Ruane	Virgil W. Raines	George D. Widener Jr.	1:49.60	
1964	Prodana Neviesta	4	Heliodoro Gustines	Bert Mulholland	Mrs. Laudy Lawrence	1:50.60	
1963	Frimanaha	6	Johnny Sellers	Edward A. Neloy	Warner L. Jones Jr.	1:50.00	
1962	Waltz Song	4	Sheridan Mellon	Thomas F. White	Thomas F. White	1:49.20	
1961	Craftiness	6	Bobby Ussery	Jim McGee	Frank J. Viggiani	1:49.60	
1960	Tempted	5	Eldon Nelson	Henry S. Clark	Mooring Stable	1:51.40	
1959	Tempted	4	Eldon Nelson	Henry S. Clark	Mooring Stable	1:50.40	
1958	Searching	6	Bill Hartack	Hirsch Jacobs	Ethel D. Jacobs	1:52.20	
1957	Pardala	4	Hedley Woodhouse	Hugh L. Fontaine	D and H Stable	1:53.00	
1956	Searching	4	Conn McCreary	Hirsch Jacobs	Ethel D. Jacobs	1:52.00	
1955	Misty Morn	3	Ted Atkinson	Jim Fitzsimmons	Wheatley Stable	1:51.20	
1954	Lavender Hill	5	Conn McCreary	Thomas W. Kelley	Mrs. Charles Silver	1:52.60	
1953	Sabette	3	Jesse Higley	Jim Fitzsimmons	Belair Stud	1:52.60	
1952	Busanda	3	Ted Atkinson	James Fitzsimmons	Ogden Phipps	1:53.40	
1951	Vulcania	3	Robert Bernhardt	Jim Fitzsimmons	Belair Stud	1:52.60	
1950	Ouija	3	William Boland	Preston M. Burch	Brookmeade Stable	1:51.60	
1949	Spats	4	Ted Atkinson	Harris B. Brown	Lillian B. Christopher	1:52.40	
1948	Carolyn A.	4	Eddie Arcaro	James P. Conway	Florence Whitaker	1:50.80	
1947	Miss Grillo	5	Conn McCreary	Horatio Luro	Mill River Stable	1:50.40	
1946	Miss Grillo	4	Conn McCreary	Horatio Luro	Mill River Stable	1:50.20	
1945	Surosa	3	Albert Snider	Richard E. Handlen	Foxcatcher Farm	1:50.80	
1944	Whirlabout	3	Herb Lindberg	Graceton Philpot	Louis B. Mayer	1:50.20	
1943	Bonnet Ann	4	Leon Haas	Hugh L. Fontaine	Brookmeade Stable	1:50.00	
1942	Pomayya	4	Alfred Robertson	Hugh L. Fontaine	Brookmeade Stable	1:53.00	
1941	Rosetown	4	Johnny Longden	Bert Mulholland	George D. Widener Jr.	1:53.40	
1940	Piquet	3	Eddie Arcaro	John M. Gaver Sr.	Greentree Stable	1:52.00	
1939	War Regalia	3	Don Meade	Preston M. Burch	Mrs. Walter M. Jeffords	1:52.20	

* 1968 – Gamely won the race but was disqualified.
