= Perfect Shirl =

American-bred Thoroughbred racehorse

- Sire: Perfect Soul
- Grandsire: Sadler's Wells
- Dam: Lady Shirl
- Damsire: That's A Nice
- Sex: Mare
- Foaled: 2007
- Country: United States
- Colour: Bay
- Breeder: Charles E. Fipke
- Owner: Charles E. Fipke
- Trainer: Roger L. Attfield
- Record: 16 : 4-2-5
- Earnings: US$1,390,729

Major wins
- Lake George Stakes (2010) Breeders' Cup wins: Breeders' Cup Filly & Mare Turf (2011)

Perfect Shirl (foaled May 10, 2007, in Kentucky) is a Thoroughbred racemare who won the 2011 Breeders' Cup Filly & Mare Turf in a 27-1 upset. She was foaled in the United States but her connections were Canadian.

== Background ==
Perfect Shirl was bred and raced by Canadian businessman Charles E. Fipke, who had also bred and raced her sire, Perfect Soul. Perfect Soul was a late-developing colt by leading sire Sadler's Wells who blossomed into a multiple graded stakes winner on the turf late in his career. Perfect Shirl's dam, Lady Shirl, was a grade I and was bought by Fipke at auction for $485,000 in 2005 as a broodmare prospect. Prior to foaling Perfect Shirl, Lady Shirl had produced Grade I winner Shakespeare and Grade II winner Lady Shakespeare. Although Lady Shirl's immediate family was unremarkable, her second dam descended from the "blue hen" mare La Troienne, one of the most distinguished female families of the 20th century.

Perfect Shirl was trained by Canadian Horse Racing Hall of Fame inductee, Roger Attfield from his base at Woodbine Racetrack in Toronto, Ontario.

== Racing career ==
Perfect Shirl did not race at age two, then failed to win in her first three races in 2010 at age three. She finally won for the first time in a maiden special weight race on the turf at Woodbine on June 13. She then followed up with a win on the Woodbine's Polytrack artificial dirt surface in an allowance race on July 11. On July 28, she was shipped to Saratoga racetrack for the Grade II Lake George Stakes on the turf, where she went off at odds of 9-1. Racing in the middle of the pack down the backstretch, Perfect Shirl started making up ground around the far turn and then moved to the lead as they neared the finish line. "When I asked her, she responded very well," said jockey John Velazquez. "The only thing the assistant told me was not to be on the lead; very simple instructions!"

Perfect Shirl then finished third in the Del Mar Oaks on August 21 and eighth in the Queen Elizabeth II Challenge Cup Stakes on October 16 at Keeneland. Atfield then gave the filly a long layoff, returning on April 16, 2011, in an allowance race at Woodbine. Perfect Shirl finished fourth and then lost her next five races as well. However, her performance in the Canadian Stakes was promising: she circled the field and closed rapidly to lose by only half-a-length.

Despite her lengthy losing streak, Attfield decided to enter the filly in the Breeders' Cup Filly and Mare Turf, held that year at Churchill Downs on November 4. Ridden again by Velazquez, she was a 27-1 longshot in a quality field featuring Stacelita and several highly regarded horses from Europe. The course was wet, which concerned Attfield, but the going was rated as good. Perfect Shirl raced behind the leaders for the first mile, then moved to the center of the racetrack and accelerated past the leaders to win by three-quarters of a length. It was the first Breeders' Cup win for both Attfield and Fipke. "I had my doubts about running her," said Attfield. "I was very concerned because she's never been able to handle a soft course. Once I saw how she was moving down the backside, I could see she was moving beautifully and I became very excited."

Perfect Shirl made one last start on February 25, 2012, in The Very One Stakes at Gulfstream Park. She finished eighth and was retired. Her first foal, More Perfect by More than Ready, was foaled in 2014.

== Pedigree ==
Pedigree of Perfect Shirl, bay mare, foaled 2007
Sire Perfect Soul	Sadler's Wells	Northern Dancer	Nearctic
Sire Perfect Soul	Sadler's Wells	Northern Dancer	Natalma
Sire Perfect Soul	Sadler's Wells	Fairy Bridge	Bold Reason
Sire Perfect Soul	Sadler's Wells	Fairy Bridge	Special
Sire Perfect Soul	Ball Chairman	Secretariat	Bold Ruler
Sire Perfect Soul	Ball Chairman	Secretariat	Somethingroyal
Sire Perfect Soul	Ball Chairman	A Status Symbol	Exclusive Native
Sire Perfect Soul	Ball Chairman	A Status Symbol	Queen Louie
Dam Lady Shirl	That's A Nice	Hey Good Lookin	Noholme
Dam Lady Shirl	That's A Nice	Hey Good Lookin	Lady Vale
Dam Lady Shirl	That's A Nice	Our Bonnie S	Palestinian
Dam Lady Shirl	That's A Nice	Our Bonnie S	Chickdale
Dam Lady Shirl	Canonization	Native Heritage	Raise a Native
Dam Lady Shirl	Canonization	Native Heritage	Tim's Princess
Dam Lady Shirl	Canonization	Heatherglow	The Axe II
Dam Lady Shirl	Canonization	Heatherglow	Brilliantly (family 1-x)
