= Starine =

French-bred Thoroughbred racehorse

- Sire: Mendocino
- Grandsire: Theatrical
- Dam: Grisonnante
- Damsire: Kaldoun
- Sex: Mare
- Foaled: 1997
- Country: France
- Colour: Gray
- Breeder: Catherine Dubois
- Owner: 1) Catherine Dubois; 2) Jozef de Cock; 3) Robert J. Frankel
- Trainer: 1) Jacques Dubois; 2) David Smaga; 3) Jean-Marie Capitte; 4) Robert J. Frankel (USA)
- Record: 33: 10-12-1
- Earnings: US$1,674,340

Major wins
- Prix des Edelweiss (1999); Prix de Mereville (1997); Prix des Rumesnil (1999); Prix de la Salle Handicap (1999); Prix Saraca (1999); Diana Handicap (2001); Matriarch Stakes (2001) Breeders' Cup wins: Breeders' Cup Filly & Mare Turf (2002)

Starine (April 26, 1997 – June 21, 2005) was a French Thoroughbred racehorse foaled in Orne who competed in France and in the United States.

== Racing career ==
=== 1999–2001 France ===
She made her racing debut for owner/breeder Catherine Dubois in June 1999 and on July 16, 1999 got her first win in the Prix des Edelweiss at Aix-les-Bains racecourse. After winning the September 24 Prix de Mereville she was claimed by Jozef de Cock. From her twelve minor race starts that year, she won five and was second four times. Winless at age three in six starts, Starine made her final start of 2000 on November 30 in the Listed Prix Ceres at Maisons-Laffitte Racecourse in which she finished last in a sixteen-horse field after having to be pulled up.

=== 2001–2002 France ===
Brought to the United States by U.S. Hall of Fame trainer, Robert Frankel, Starine made her American debut on May 18, 2001 with a second-place finish in the Grade 3 Gallorette Handicap at Pimlico Race Course. Then, on June 6, 2001, she ran fifth in another Grade III, the Just A Game Breeders' Cup Handicap at Belmont Park. In her third American start, Starine won an Allowance race at Saratoga Race Course then on the same course captured the October 3 Grade 2 Diana Handicap. She next ran third in the Grade 1 Flower Bowl Invitational Handicap and tenth to the Frankel-trained Banks Hill in the 2001 Breeders' Cup Filly & Mare Turf, both races at Belmont Park. Shipped to California, on November 25 Starine closed out her 2001 campaign with a win in the Grade 1 Matriarch Stakes at Hollywood Park.

Based in California, Starine returned to racing as a five-year-old in March 2002. She ran second in both the Santa Ana and Gamely Handicaps. On September 28, she finished fourth in the Flower Bowl Invitational at Belmont Park. Entered in the US$1 million Breeders' Cup Filly & Mare Turf for the second straight year, Starine was sent off at more than 13:1 odds by the bettors at Arlington Park. Starine took the lead after an eighth of a mile in and led the rest of the way to win by a length and-a-half over her hard-charging stablemate and 2001 winner, Banks Hill.

== Stud record ==
Retired from racing, Starine was sold at the Keeneland November breeding stock sale for US$1 million to Newsells Park Stud at Royston, Hertfordshire, England. In 2004, she foaled a filly by the Champion sire Danehill. Her filly, who would be named Senta's Dream, was sold at the 2005 Agence Française Deauville August Yearling Sale for €300,000 to the Chantilly Racecourse-based trainer Urs Suter. Starine was next bred to Green Desert, foaling a colt on April 16, 2005 that would be named Media Stars. Less than two months later Starine died, reportedly from Equine protozoal myeloencephalitis (EPM). Neither of her two foals met with success in racing. Senta's Dream was unraced but has produced three Group One and Grade One-winning foals in Iridessa, Order of Australia and Santa Barbara.
