= Intercontinental (horse) =

British-bred Thoroughbred racehorse

- Sire: Danehill
- Grandsire: Danzig
- Dam: Hasili
- Damsire: Kahyasi
- Sex: Filly
- Foaled: 2000
- Country: Great Britain
- Colour: Bay
- Breeder: Juddmonte Farms
- Owner: Khalid Abdullah
- Trainer: 1) André Fabre (Europe); 2) Robert J. Frankel (U.S.)
- Record: 22: 13-3-4
- Earnings: US$2,052,463

Major wins
- Jenny Wiley Stakes (2004, 2005); Just A Game Breeders' Cup Handicap (2004); Matriarch Stakes (2004); Galaxy Stakes (2005); Palomar Breeders' Cup Handicap (2005); Royal Heroine Invitational Stakes (2005); Breeders' Cup wins: Breeders' Cup Filly & Mare Turf (2005)

Awards
- American Champion Female Turf Horse (2005)

Intercontinental (foaled 2000 in England) is a Thoroughbred Champion racehorse who competed in England, France, and the United States.

Bred and raced by Khalid Abdullah's Juddmonte Farms, she was sired by Danehill, a multiple Champion sire in England, Ireland, and France and the most successful sire in the history of Australian Thoroughbred racing. Her dam was the outstanding broodmare Hasili, whose sire Kahyasi won the 1988 Irish and Epsom Derbys. Intercontinental is a full sister to Cacique, Banks Hill, and Champs Elysees.

Based in France with trainer André Fabre, Intercontinental made three starts at age two. She won two races and was third in the Group One Grand Critérium. At age three in 2003, she made six starts at racecourses in France and England. Her only win came in the Listed Prix Amandine for three-year-old fillies at Deauville-La Touques Racecourse. She notably ran third to winner Russian Rhythm in the Group One 1,000 Guineas Stakes at Newmarket Racecourse.

At age four, Intercontinental was sent to Robert Frankel, Juddmonte Farms' trainer in the United States. For the U.S. Racing Hall of Fame trainer, Intercontinental began 2004 with a win in the Jenny Wiley Stakes at Keeneland Race Course in Lexington, Kentucky. She also won the Just A Game Breeders' Cup Handicap at Belmont Park in Elmont, New York and got her first Grade 1 win at Hollywood Park Racetrack in Inglewood, California in the Matriarch Stakes.

== 2005 Championship Year ==
At age five, Intercontinental had her best year. She won her second straight edition of the Jenny Wiley Stakes and also won the Galaxy Stakes, the Palomar Breeders' Cup Handicap, and the Royal Heroine Invitational Stakes before winning the richest and most important race of her career. The 2005 Breeders' Cup Filly & Mare Turf at Belmont Park was the final race of Intercontinental's career and she won it by defeating the defending champion, Ouija Board, by a length. It was the first ever Breeders' Cup win for her jockey, Rafael Bejarano.

Intercontinental's 2005 performances earned her the Eclipse Award as that year's American Champion Female Turf Horse.

== As a broodmare ==
After earning more than US$2 million in racing, Intercontinental was sent to broodmare duty at the Juddmonte Farms breeding operation near Lexington, Kentucky. In 2007, she gave birth to her first foal, a filly by Empire Maker.
