= Banks Hill =

British-bred Thoroughbred racehorse

- Sire: Danehill
- Grandsire: Danzig
- Dam: Hasili
- Damsire: Kahyasi
- Sex: Mare
- Foaled: 1998
- Country: Great Britain
- Colour: Bay
- Breeder: Juddmonte Farms
- Owner: Khalid Abdullah
- Trainer: André Fabre; Robert J. Frankel
- Record: 15: 5-5-3
- Earnings: £1,312,394

Major wins
- Prix Pearl Cap (2000); Prix de Sandringham (2001); Coronation Stakes (2001); Breeders' Cup Filly & Mare Turf (2001); Prix Jacques Le Marois (2002)

Awards
- European Champion Three-Year-Old Filly (2001); American Champion Female Turf Horse (2001)

Banks Hill (foaled February 24, 1998 in England) was a French Thoroughbred Champion racehorse. She was bred and raced by Khalid Abdullah's Juddmonte Farms. She was sired by Danehill, a multiple Champion sire in England, Ireland, and France and the most successful sire in the history of Australian Thoroughbred racing. Her dam was the outstanding broodmare, Hasili, whose sire Kahyasi won the 1988 Irish and Epsom Derbys. Banks Hill is a full sister to Cacique, Intercontinental, Dansili and Champs Elysees.

== 2001 European and American Champion ==
Trained by André Fabre, Banks Hill made her racing debut at age two with a win in the Prix Pearl Cap at Maisons-Laffitte Racecourse on October 31, 2000. She had an outstanding year at age three, winning the Prix de Sandringham at Chantilly Racecourse and England's Group 1 Coronation Stakes at Ascot Racecourse before being sent to Belmont Park in Elmont, New York, There, she gave Juddmonte Farms their first ever Breeders' Cup win with an impressive 5½-length victory in the October 27 Breeders' Cup Filly & Mare Turf. Banks Hill's 2001 performances earned her the Eclipse Award as the American Champion Female Turf Horse and the Cartier Award as the European Champion Three-Year-Old Filly.

Banks Hill's only win of 2002 came on August 18 in her third start when she captured the Group 1 Prix Jacques Le Marois at Deauville Racecourse. After running second to Rock of Gibraltar in the September 8 Prix du Moulin de Longchamp, she was sent back to the United States in September 2002 where she ran third in the October 5 Yellow Ribbon Stakes after which trainer André Fabre recommended she be transferred to American trainer Robert Frankel to prepare for the defense of her Breeders' Cup title. For Frankel, Banks Hill ran second behind stablemate Starine in her return to the Breeders' Cup Filly & Mare Turf on October 26 at Arlington Park, and in the final start of her career on December 2, ran fourth in the Matriarch Stakes at Hollywood Park Racetrack.

== Stud record ==
Banks Hill has produced the following foals.

- 2004 Cavvy, colt by Kingmambo, unraced.
- 2005 Ideal World, colt by Kingmambo, dual listed winner and group 2 runner up in France.
- 2006 Trojan Queen, filly by Empire Maker, winner in France and dam of group 3 winner Sangarius and group 3 placed Emergent.
- 2008, colt by Giants Causeway, died as a yearling.
- 2009 Romantica, filly by Galileo, 4 wins including Group 1 Prix Jean Romanet and runner up in Group 1 Breeders' Cup Filly & Mare Turf.
- 2010 Dumfriesshire, filly by Oasis Dream, unraced.
- 2013 Replete, filly by Makfi, unraced.
- 2014 Ringleader, gelding by New Approach, unplaced in two starts.
- 2016 Wherewithal, gelding by Lope De Vega placed at 1 mile
- 2018 Caprioli, colt by Galileo
