= Hasili (horse) =

Irish-bred Thoroughbred racehorse

- Sire: Kahyasi
- Grandsire: Ile de Bourbon
- Dam: Kerali
- Damsire: High Line
- Sex: Mare
- Foaled: 12 March 1991
- Died: 23 March 2018 (aged 27)
- Country: Ireland
- Colour: Bay
- Breeder: Juddmonte Farms
- Owner: Khalid Abdullah
- Trainer: Henri-Alex Pantall
- Record: 7: 1-2-0

Major wins
- Prix des Sablonnets (1993)

Hasili (12 March 1991 – 23 March 2018) was a French Thoroughbred racehorse who was an outstanding broodmare. A Khalid Abdullah hombred at his Juddmonte Farms, she was out of the mare Kerali and sired by Kahyasi, winner of the 1988 Irish and Epsom Derbys. Hasili won the Prix des Sablonnets at Nantes at age two and was placed in two Listed races at three.

Retired to broodmare duty, Hasili produced Cacique, Champs Elysees, Banks Hill, Intercontinental, and Heat Haze who together made her the first Northern Hemisphere broodmare to produce five Group/Grade I winners, all of which are racing millionaires.

Hasili was also the dam of Dansili, sire of Rail Link who won the 2006 Prix de l'Arc de Triomphe, and of Deluxe, a 2007 filly by Storm Cat, and a 2008 filly by Empire Maker.

Hasili died at Juddmonte Farms's Banstead Manor Stud at Newmarket, England on 23 March 2018.

== Pedigree ==
Pedigree of Hasili, bay mare, foaled March 12, 1991
Sire Kahyasi bay 1985	Ile de Bourbon b. 1975	Nijinsky b. 1967	Northern Dancer
Sire Kahyasi bay 1985	Ile de Bourbon b. 1975	Nijinsky b. 1967	Flaming Page
Sire Kahyasi bay 1985	Ile de Bourbon b. 1975	Roseliere dkb/br. 1965	Misti
Sire Kahyasi bay 1985	Ile de Bourbon b. 1975	Roseliere dkb/br. 1965	Peace Rose
Sire Kahyasi bay 1985	Kadissya b. 1979	Blushing Groom ch. 1974	Red God
Sire Kahyasi bay 1985	Kadissya b. 1979	Blushing Groom ch. 1974	Runaway Bride
Sire Kahyasi bay 1985	Kadissya b. 1979	Kalkeen b. 1974	Sheshoon
Sire Kahyasi bay 1985	Kadissya b. 1979	Kalkeen b. 1974	Gioia
Dam Kerali chestnut 1984	High Line ch. 1966	High Hat ch. 1957	Hyperion
Dam Kerali chestnut 1984	High Line ch. 1966	High Hat ch. 1957	Madonna
Dam Kerali chestnut 1984	High Line ch. 1966	Time Call b. 1955	Chanteur
Dam Kerali chestnut 1984	High Line ch. 1966	Time Call b. 1955	Aleria
Dam Kerali chestnut 1984	Sookera dkb/br. 1975	Roberto b. 1969	Hail To Reason
Dam Kerali chestnut 1984	Sookera dkb/br. 1975	Roberto b. 1969	Bramalea
Dam Kerali chestnut 1984	Sookera dkb/br. 1975	Irule gr. 1968	Young Emperor
Dam Kerali chestnut 1984	Sookera dkb/br. 1975	Irule gr. 1968	Iaround (Family 11)
