= André Fabre =

French horse racing trainer

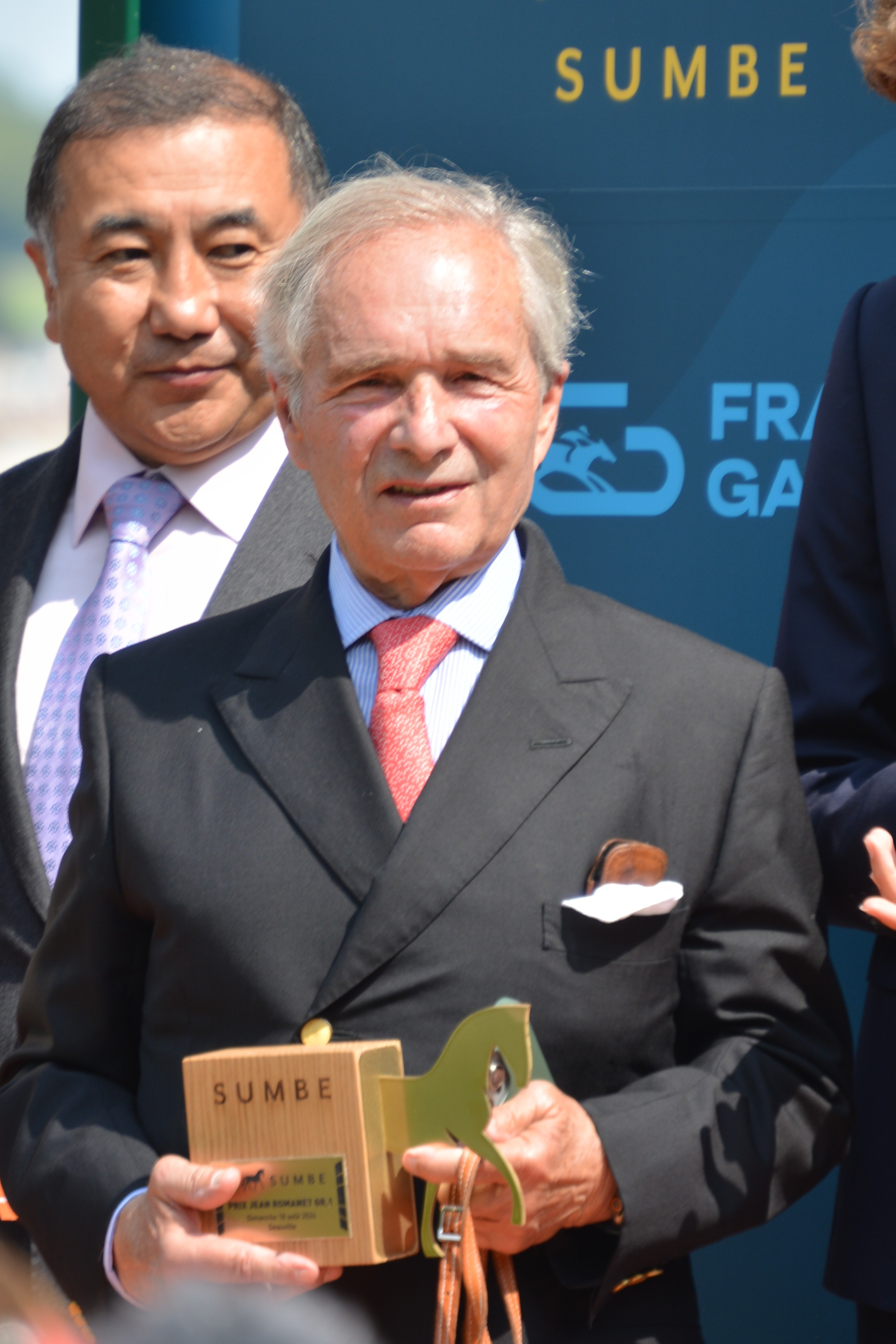
André Fabre, victoire dans le prix Jean Romanet (Gr. I) 2024

André Fabre (French pronunciation: [ɑ̃dʁe fabʁ]; born 9 December 1945) is a French thoroughbred horse racing trainer.

The son of a diplomat, Fabre graduated from university with a law degree but then decided to pursue a career in thoroughbred horse racing. He began by working in the stables as a groom then as a schooling rider. He became France's leading jump jockey, winning more than two hundred and fifty races including the Grand Steeple-Chase de Paris. When he turned to training horses, Fabre proved even more successful, first with jump horses then with flat racers.

He has been the champion trainer in France on 30 occasions, including 21 straight years from 1987 to 2007, and is one of the most successful trainers in the world, winning across Europe and North America including four Breeders' Cup races. Among the many champions Fabre has trained are Trempolino, Peintre Celebre, and two horses ranked No. 1 in the world, Hurricane Run (2005) and Manduro (2007). Fabre fulfilled a lifelong ambition by finally winning the Epsom Derby in 2011 with Pour Moi

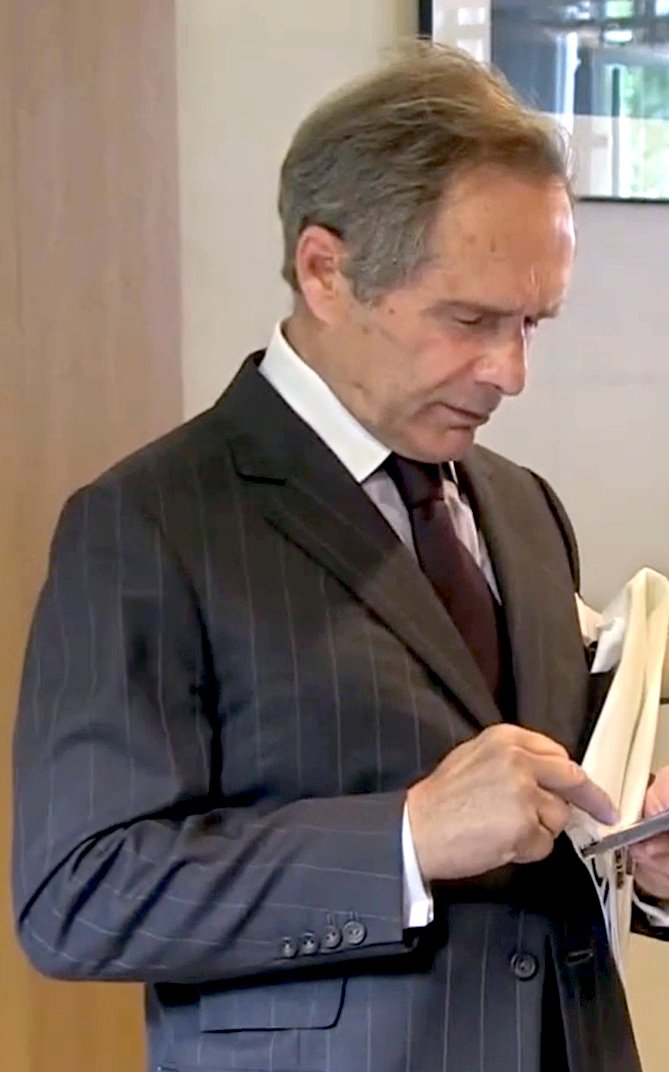
André Fabre in 2013

== Major wins ==
France

- Critérium International – (2) – Carlotamix (2005), Thewayyouare (2007)
- Critérium de Saint-Cloud – (6) – Miserden (1988), Sunshack (1993), Sagacity (2000), Linda's Lad (2005), Mandaean (2011), Waldgeist (2016)
- Grand Prix de Paris – (14) – Dancehall (1989), Subotica (1991), Homme de Loi (1992), Fort Wood (1993), Grape Tree Road (1996), Peintre Celebre (1997), Limpid (1998), Slickly (1999), Rail Link (2006), Cavalryman (2009), Meandre (2011), Flintshire (2013), Gallante (2014), Sosie (2024)
- Grand Prix de Saint-Cloud – (8) – Village Star (1988), In the Wings (1990), Apple Tree (1994), Carnegie (1995), Fragrant Mix (1998), Plumania (2010), Meandre (2012), Waldgeist (2018)
- Poule d'Essai des Poulains – (8) – Siberian Express (1984), Soviet Star (1987), Vahorimix (2001), Clodovil (2003), Lope de Vega (2010), Make Believe (2015), Persian King (2019), Victor Ludorum (2020)
- Poule d'Essai des Pouliches – (3) – Houseproud (1990), Musical Chimes (2003), Golden Lilac (2011)
- Prix de l'Arc de Triomphe – (8) – Trempolino (1987), Subotica (1992), Carnegie (1994), Peintre Celebre (1997), Sagamix (1998), Hurricane Run (2005), Rail Link (2006), Waldgeist (2019)
- Prix du Cadran – (2) – Victoire Bleue (1991), Reefscape (2005)
- Prix de Diane – (4) – Lypharita (1985), Jolypha (1992), Nebraska Tornado (2003), Golden Lilac (2011)
- Prix de la Forêt – (3) – Soviet Star (1987), Poplar Bluff (1995), Make Believe (2015)
- Prix Ganay – (8) – Creator (1990), Subotica (1992), Indian Danehill (2000), Cutlass Bay (2010), Cloth of Stars (2017), Waldgeist (2019), Mare Australis (2021), Sosie (2025)
- Prix d'Ispahan – (11) – Al Nasr (1982), Crystal Glitters (1984), Creator (1990), Arcangues (1993), Loup Sauvage (1998), Valixir (2005), Manduro (2007), Golden Lilac (2012), Persian King (2020), Mqse de Sevigne (2024), Sosie (2025)
- Prix Jacques Le Marois – (7) – Polish Precedent (1989), Miss Satamixa (1995), Vahorimix (2001), Banks Hill (2002), Manduro (2007), Esoterique (2015), Al Wukair (2017)
- Prix Jean-Luc Lagardère – (6) – Jade Robbery (1989), Goldmark (1994), Loup Solitaire (1995), Ultra (2015), Victor Ludorum (2019), Belbek (2022)
- Prix Jean Prat – (5) – Local Talent (1989), Kitwood (1992), Mutual Trust (2011), Aesop's Fables (2012), Territories (2015)
- Prix Jean Romanet - (4) - Announce (2011), Romantica (2013) Mqse de Sevigne (2023, 2024)
- Prix du Jockey Club – (4) – Peintre Celebre (1997), Lope de Vega (2010), Intello (2013), New Bay (2015)
- Prix Lupin – (2) – Cloudings (1997), Gracioso (1999)
- Prix Marcel Boussac – (1) – Miss Tahiti (1995), Zellie (2021)
- Prix Morny – (1) – Zafonic (1992)
- Prix du Moulin de Longchamp – (7) – Soviet Star (1988), Polish Precedent (1989), Ski Paradise (1994), Nebraska Tornado (2003), Grey Lilas (2004), Vadamos (2016), Tribalist (2024)
- Prix de l'Opéra – (3) – Colour Chart (1990), Clodora (1997), Place Du Carrousel (2022)
- Prix Rothschild – (7) – Nashmeel (1987), Ski Paradise (1993), Smolensk (1995), Daneskaya (1997), Esoterique (2014), Mqse de Sevigne (2023, 2024)
- Prix Royal-Oak – (7) – Star Lift (1988), Top Sunrise (1989), Raintrap (1993), Sunshack (1995), Amilynx (1999, 2000), Be Fabulous (2011)
- Prix Saint-Alary – (8) – Grise Mine (1984), Rosefinch (1992), Intrepidity (1993), Moonlight Dance (1994), Muncie (1995), Luna Wells (1996), Vadawina (2005), Wavering (2011)
- Prix de la Salamandre – (3) – Zafonic (1992), Pennekamp (1994), Xaar (1997)
- Prix Vermeille – (3) – Jolypha (1992), Intrepidity (1993), Baltic Baroness (2014)
- Prix Maurice de Gheest – (1) – Sajir (2025)
- Grand Steeple Chase de Paris – (4) – Fondeur (1980), Isopani (1981), Metatero (1982), Jasmin II (1983))

Canada

- Canadian International Stakes – (2) – French Glory (1990), Raintrap (1994)

Germany

- Aral-Pokal – (1) – Tel Quel (1992)
- Bayerisches Zuchtrennen - (1) - Elliptique (2016)
- Grosser Preis von Berlin - (1) - Meandre (2012)
- Grosser Preis von Bayern - (1) - Junko (2023)
- Preis von Europa – (1) – Apple Tree (1992)

Hong Kong

- Hong Kong Vase – (4) –Borgia (1999), Flintshire (2014), Junko (2023), Sosie (2025)

(United Kingdom) Great Britain

- 2,000 Guineas – (2) – Zafonic (1993), Pennekamp (1995)
- 1,000 Guineas - (1) - Miss France (2014)
- Champion Stakes – (2) – Tel Quel (1991), Dernier Empereur (1994)
- Coronation Cup – (6) – Saint Estephe (1986), In the Wings (1990), Apple Tree (1994), Sunshack (1995), Swain (1996), Shirocco (2006)
- Coronation Stakes – (2) – Golden Opinion (1989), Banks Hill (2001)
- Derby Stakes – (1) – Pour Moi (2011)
- Dewhurst Stakes – (3) – Zafonic (1992), Pennekamp (1994), Xaar (1997)
- July Cup – (1) – Soviet Star (1988)
- King George VI and Queen Elizabeth Stakes – (1) – Hurricane Run (2006)
- Middle Park Stakes – (3) – Lycius (1990), Zieten (1992), Earthlight (2019)
- Oaks – (1) – Intrepidity (1993)
- Prince of Wales's Stakes – (2) – Manduro (2007), Byword (2010)
- Queen Anne Stakes – (1) – Valixir (2005)
- St Leger – (1) – Toulon (1991)
- Sun Chariot Stakes - (1) - Esoterique (2015)
- Sussex Stakes – (1) – Soviet Star (1987)

(Republic of Ireland) Ireland

- Irish Derby – (2) – Winged Love (1995), Hurricane Run (2005)
- Irish Oaks – (1) – Wemyss Bight (1993)
- Tattersalls Gold Cup – (1) – Hurricane Run (2006)

Italy

- Derby Italiano – (1) – Gentlewave (2006)
- Gran Premio d'Italia – (1) – Pigeon Voyageur (1991)
- Oaks d'Italia – (1) – Valley of Gold (1995)

United Arab Emirates

- Dubai Sheema Classic – (1) – Polish Summer (2004)

United States

- Arlington Million – (1) – Mill Native (1988)
- Breeders' Cup Classic – (1) – Arcangues (1993)
- Breeders' Cup Filly & Mare Turf – (1) – Banks Hill (2001)
- Breeders' Cup Turf – (3) – In the Wings (1990), Shirocco (2005), Talismanic (2017)
- Oak Tree Invitational Stakes - (2) - Zalataia (1983), Nasr El Arab (1988)
- Sword Dancer Invitational Handicap - (1) - Flintshire (2015)
- Turf Classic Invitational Stakes – (1) – Apple Tree (1993)
