= Breeders' Cup Filly & Mare Turf =

American Thoroughbred horse race

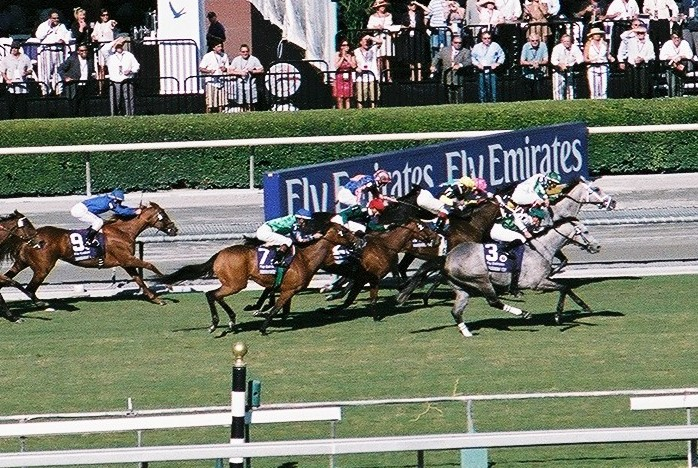
- The 2008 Breeders' Cup Filly & Mare Turf
- Class: Grade 1
- Location: North America
- Inaugurated: 1999
- Race type: Thoroughbred – Flat racing

Race information
- Distance: 1 1/4 miles (2,000 m) (10 times); 1 3/8 miles (2,200 m) (7 times); 1 3/16 miles (1,900 m) (once); 1 1/8 miles (1,800 m) (once)
- Surface: Turf
- Track: Left-handed
- Qualification: Fillies and Mares, 3-years-old & up
- Weight: Weight for Age
- Purse: US$2,000,000

The Breeders' Cup Filly & Mare Turf is a Weight for Age Thoroughbred horse race on turf for fillies and mares, three years old and up. It is held annually at a different racetrack in the United States as part of the Breeders' Cup World Championships.

This race is a middle distance Grade 1 which has consistently drawn the best female turf horses not just from the United States but around the world. The race is run at either 1 1/4 miles (2,000 m) or 1 3/8 miles (2,200 m), depending on the turf course configuration at the Breeders' Cup host track. For tracks which can accommodate either distance (Belmont, Woodbine, and Santa Anita), it is run at 1 1/4 miles. The 2015 edition at Keeneland was conducted at 1 3/16 miles because that track's turf course configuration does not allow for the two regular distances to be conducted on it. For the same reason, the 2017 edition at Del Mar was held at a distance of 1 1/8 miles.

== Automatic berths ==
Beginning in 2007, the Breeders' Cup developed the Breeders' Cup Challenge, a series of races in each division that allotted automatic qualifying bids to winners of defined races. Each of the fourteen divisions has multiple qualifying races. Note though that one horse may win multiple challenge races, while other challenge winners will not be entered in the Breeders' Cup for a variety of reasons such as injury or travel considerations.

In the Filly & Mare Turf division, runners are limited to 14 and there are up to nine automatic berths. The 2022 "Win and You're In" races were:

1. the Paddock Stakes, a Group 1 race run in January at the Kenilworth Racecourse in South Africa
2. the Victoria Mile, a Grade 1 race run in May at Tokyo Racecourse in Japan
3. the Gran Premio Pamplona, a Group 1 run in June at Hipódromo de Monterrico in Peru
4. the Beverly D. Stakes, a Grade 1 race run in August at Churchill Downs in Kentucky
5. the Yorkshire Oaks, a Group 1 race run in August at York Racecourse in England
6. the Flower Bowl Invitational Stakes, a Grade 1 race at Saratoga Race Course in New York
7. the Matron Stakes, a Group 1 race run in September at Leopardstown in Ireland
8. the Rodeo Drive Stakes, a Grade 1 race run in October at Santa Anita Park in California
9. the Prix de l'Opéra, a Group 1 race run in October at Longchamp Racecourse in Paris, France

== Records ==
Most wins:

- Ouija Board (2004, 2006)

Most wins by a jockey:

- 3 – John R. Velazquez (2002, 2011, 2018)
- 3 - Frankie Dettori (2006, 2016, 2023)

Most wins by a trainer:

- 5 – Chad C. Brown (2012, 2014, 2015, 2018, 2026)

Most wins by an owner:

- 3 – Juddmonte Farms (2001, 2005, 2009)
- 2 – Lord Derby (2004, 2006)
- 2 - Cheveley Park Stud (2016, 2023)

== Winners ==
| Year | Winner | Age | Jockey | Trainer | Owner | Time | Miles | Purse | Grade |
|---|---|---|---|---|---|---|---|---|---|
| 2026 | Kathynmarissa | 5 | José Ortiz | Chad C. Brown | Michael Dubb & Michael J. Caruso | 1:53.75 | 1 3/16 | $2,000,000 | I |
| 2025 | Gezora (FR) | 5 | Mickael Barzalona | Francis - Henri Graffard | Peter M. Brant | 2:12.54 | 1 3/8 | $2,000,000 | I |
| 2024 | Moira | 5 | Flavien Prat | Kevin Attard | X-Men Racing, Madaket Stables and SF Racing | 2:14.95 | 1 3/8 | $2,000,000 | I |
| 2023 | Inspiral (GB) | 4 | Frankie Dettori | John & Thady Gosden | Cheveley Park Stud | 1:59.60 | 1 1/4 | $2,000,000 | I |
| 2022 | Tuesday (IRE) | 3 | Ryan Moore | Aidan O'Brien | Mrs. John Magnier, Michael Tabor, Derrick Smith & Westerberg | 1:51.88 | 1 3/16 | $2,000,000 | I |
| 2021 | Loves Only You (JPN) | 5 | Yuga Kawada | Yoshito Yahagi | DMM Dream Club Co. | 2:13.87 | 1 3/8 | $2,000,000 | I |
| 2020 | Audarya (FR) | 4 | Pierre-Charles Boudot | James Fanshawe | Alison Swinburn | 1:52.72 | 1 3/16 | $2,000,000 | I |
| 2019 | Iridessa (IRE) | 3 | Wayne Lordan | Joseph O'Brien | Chantal Regalado-Gonzalez | 1:57.77 | 1 1/4 | $2,000,000 | I |
| 2018 | Sistercharlie (IRE) | 4 | John R. Velazquez | Chad C. Brown | Peter M. Brant | 2:20.96 | 1 3/8 | $2,000,000 | I |
| 2017 | Wuheida (GB) | 3 | William Buick | Charlie Appleby | Godolphin | 1:47.91 | 1 1/8 | $2,000,000 | I |
| 2016 | Queen's Trust (GB) | 3 | Frankie Dettori | Sir Michael Stoute | Cheveley Park Stud | 1:57.75 | 1 1/4 | $2,000,000 | I |
| 2015 | Stephanie's Kitten | 6 | Irad Ortiz | Chad C. Brown | Kenneth and Sarah Ramsey | 1:56.22 | 1 3/16 | $2,000,000 | I |
| 2014 | Dayatthespa | 5 | Javier Castellano | Chad C. Brown | Jerry Frankel, Ronald Frankel, Steve Laymon & Bradley Thoroughbreds | 2:01.40 | 1 1/4 | $2,000,000 | I |
| 2013 | Dank (GB) | 4 | Ryan Moore | Sir Michael Stoute | James Wigan | 1:58.73 | 1 1/4 | $2,000,000 | I |
| 2012 | Zagora (FR) | 4 | Javier Castellano | Chad C. Brown | Martin S. Schwartz | 1:59.70 | 1 1/4 | $2,000,000 | I |
| 2011 | Perfect Shirl | 4 | John R. Velazquez | Roger Attfield | Charles E. Fipke | 2:18.62 | 1 3/8 | $2,000,000 | I |
| 2010 | Shared Account | 4 | Edgar Prado | Graham Motion | Sagamore Farm | 2:17.74 | 1 3/8 | $2,000,000 | I |
| 2009 | Midday (GB) | 3 | Tom Queally | Henry Cecil | Juddmonte Farms | 1:59.14 | 1 1/4 | $2,000,000 | I |
| 2008 | Forever Together | 4 | Julien Leparoux | Jonathan Sheppard | Augustin Stable | 2:01.58 | 1 1/4 | $2,000,000 | I |
| 2007 | Lahudood (GB) | 4 | Alan Garcia | Kiaran McLaughlin | Shadwell Racing | 2:22.75 | 1 3/8 | $2,000,000 | I |
| 2006 | Ouija Board (GB) | 5 | Frankie Dettori | Ed Dunlop | Lord Derby | 2:14.55 | 1 3/8 | $2,000,000 | I |
| 2005 | Intercontinental (GB) | 5 | Rafael Bejarano | Robert J. Frankel | Juddmonte Farms | 2:02.34 | 1 1/4 | $2,000,000 | I |
| 2004 | Ouija Board (GB) | 3 | Kieren Fallon | Ed Dunlop | Lord Derby | 2:18.25 | 1 3/8 | $1,000,000 | I |
| 2003 | Islington (IRE) | 4 | Kieren Fallon | Sir Michael Stoute | Ballymacoll Stud | 1:59.13 | 1 1/4 | $1,000,000 | I |
| 2002 | Starine (FR) | 5 | John R. Velazquez | Robert J. Frankel | Robert J. Frankel | 2:03.57 | 1 1/4 | $1,000,000 | I |
| 2001 | Banks Hill (GB) | 3 | Olivier Peslier | André Fabre | Juddmonte Farms | 2:00.36 | 1 1/4 | $1,000,000 | I |
| 2000 | Perfect Sting | 4 | Jerry Bailey | Joe Orseno | Stronach Stables | 2:13.07 | 1 3/8 | $1,000,000 | I |
| 1999 | Soaring Softly | 4 | Jerry Bailey | James J. Toner | Phillips Racing Partnership | 2:13.89 | 1 3/8 | $1,000,000 | I |

== See also ==
- Breeders' Cup Filly & Mare Turf "top three finishers" and starters
- Breeders' Cup World Thoroughbred Championships
- American thoroughbred racing top attended events
