= Dayatthespa =

American-bred Thoroughbred racehorse

- Sire: City Zip
- Grandsire: Carson City
- Dam: M'Lady Doc
- Damsire: Doc's Leader
- Sex: Mare
- Foaled: February 17, 2009
- Country: United States
- Colour: Chestnut
- Breeder: Castellare di Cracchiolo Stable, Cracchiolo & Goldsher
- Owner: Steve Laymon, Bradley Thoroughbreds et al Jerry Frankel et al
- Trainer: Chad Brown
- Record: 18: 11-4-0
- Earnings: $2,288,892

Major wins
- Herecomesthebride Stakes (2012); Appalachian Stakes (2012); Queen Elizabeth II Challenge Cup (2012); First Lady Stakes (2014); Breeders' Cup Filly & Mare Turf (2014)

Awards
- American Champion Female Turf Horse (2014)

Dayatthespa (foaled February 17, 2009) is an American Thoroughbred racehorse. As a three-year-old in 2012 she won her first five races including the Herecomesthebride Stakes, Appalachian Stakes and Queen Elizabeth II Challenge Cup. After winning two races in an abbreviated 2013 season she reached her peak as a five-year-old in 2014, winning the Yaddo Stakes, the First Lady Stakes and the Breeders' Cup Filly & Mare Turf.

== Background ==
Dayatthespa is a chestnut mare with a narrow white blaze bred in New York by Castellare di Cracchiolo Stable, Cracchiolo & Goldsher. Her sire City Zip, a half-brother to Ghostzapper, showed his best form as a two-year-old in 2000 when he won the Hopeful Stakes and dead-heated for first place in the Belmont Futurity. Her dam, M'Lady Doc was a descendant of the broodmare Friar's Carse, making her a distant relative of Sword Dancer, Hail To All and Rachel Alexandra.

The filly was sent to the 2010 Fasig-Tipton New York-bred preferred sale, and bought for $50,000 by Niall Brennan a "pinhooker" who looks to make a profit by buying and selling young horses. In 2011, she was sent to the Ocala Breeders' Sales March 2-year-olds in training sale, but was withdrawn after several potential buyers were reportedly discouraged from bidding by the poor conformation of her forelegs and unimpressive walk. Brennan opted to sell her privately to the bloodstock agent Peter Bradley and Steve Laymon. Commenting on the decision Bradley said "she looked great on the track and they don't have any walking races."

== Racing career ==
=== 2011: two-year-old season ===
Dayatthespa was ridden in all three of her races as a two-year-old by the Venezuelan jockey Ramon Domínguez. On August 4 she won a maiden race over five and a half furlongs at Saratoga Race Course and was then moved up in class and distance for the Grade II Natalma Stakes at Woodbine Racecourse in September. Starting at odds of 4.9/1 she took the lead in the straight but was overtaken inside the final furlong and finished second, beaten one and a quarter lengths by Northern Passion. On her third and final appearance of the season she finished ninth behind Stephanie's Kitten in the Breeders' Cup Juvenile Fillies Turf.

=== 2012: three-year-old season ===
Javier Castellano took over as Dayatthespa's regular jockey in 2012, when she won five of her six races. She began the year with two runs at Gulfstream Park, winning the Sweetest Chant Stakes over a mile in January and then started 9/10 favourite for the Grade III Herecomesthebride Stakes on March 11. She took the lead entering the straight and held on to win by a neck from Regalo Mia. She added another Grade III success in April, beating Somali Lemonade by two and three quarter lengths in the Appalachian Stakes at Keeneland. Steve Laymon explained that the filly needed firm turf to show her best and had been unsuited by the soft conditions in the Breeders' Cup, whilst Castellano described her as "very impressive". In August she won the Riskaverse Stakes at Saratoga and was then moved up to Grade I level for the Queen Elizabeth II Challenge Cup Stakes over nine furlongs. She started second favourite at odds of 3.3/1 behind Stephanie's Kitten in a field which also included Somali Lemonade and the Irish 1,000 Guineas winner Samitar. Dayatthespa took the lead soon after the start and set a steady pace before accelerating clear of the field two furlongs from the finish and winning by two lengths and half a length from Centre Court and Better Lucky. The filly started favourite for the Grade I Matriarch Stakes at Hollywood Park Racetrack on November 25 but stumbled after jumping a shadow early in the race and finished fifth behind Better Lucky.

=== 2013: four-year-old season ===
Dayatthespa began her third season by winning the You Go West Girl Stakes over one mile at Belmont Park in May and then finished second when odds-on favourite for the Eatontown Handicap at Monmouth Park on June 29. She won the Yaddo Stakes at Saratoga on August 17 and then returned to Grade I class for the First Lady Stakes at Keeneland on October 5. Starting the 2.7/1 favourite she took the lead a furlong and a half from the finish but was overtaken in the closing stages and beaten a head by Better Lucky. As in the previous year, she ended her season with a run in the Matriarch Stakes, and finished fourth of the nine runners behind Egg Drop.

=== 2014: five-year-old season ===
Dayatthespa did not reappear in 2014 until August, when she ran twice at Saratoga. She was beaten a head by Filimbi in the De La Rose Stakes and then won the Yaddo Stakes for a second time, beating the favored Discreet Marq by two and a half lengths. On October 4 she ran for the second time in the First Lady Stakes at Keeneland and started at odds of 19/5 in a field which included Filimbi, Better Lucky, Discreet Marq, Somali Lemonade and Centre Court. Ridden by John R. Velazquez she tracked the leaders before taking the lead a furlong and a half from the finish and won by one and a quarter lengths and a neck from Better Lucky and Filimbi. After the race Velazquez said "She broke really well and the other speed went to the front, so it worked well. I was just holding it together and when I let her go at the quarter pole, she was all fresh. She finished unbelievable.".

On November 1 at Santa Anita Park Dayatthepa contested the sixteenth running of the Breeders' Cup Filly & Mare Turf. Reunited with Castellano, she started the 11/2 third choice in the betting behind the British filly Dank (winner of the race in 2013) and Stephanie's Kitten, with the other runners including Just The Judge, winner of the Irish 1000 Guineas and E. P. Taylor Stakes. She led from the start, and set a slow early pace before accelerating to go two lengths clear in the straight. Dayattthespa stayed on strongly to win by one and a quarter lengths from Stephanie's Kitten, with Just The Judge and Dank in third and fourth. Castellano explained "I thought she could get the distance if we could get away with a slow pace. When we got the three-quarters in 1:13 I thought to myself, 'We're going to steal this thing,' and we did."

On November 3, 2014, Dayatthespa was sold for $2,100,000 to Stonestreet Farms in Lexington, where she began her life as a broodmare. She was bred to Curlin in 2015 and gave birth to a beautiful filly in February 2016. Baby Spa looks just like her gorgeous parents.

== Pedigree ==
Pedigree of Dayatthespa (USA), chestnut mare, 2009
Sire City Zip (USA) 1998	Carson City (USA); 1987	Mr. Prospector	Raise a Native
Sire City Zip (USA) 1998	Carson City (USA); 1987	Mr. Prospector	Gold Digger
Sire City Zip (USA) 1998	Carson City (USA); 1987	Blushing Promise	Blushing Groom
Sire City Zip (USA) 1998	Carson City (USA); 1987	Blushing Promise	Summertime Promise
Sire City Zip (USA) 1998	Baby Zip (USA); 1991	Relaunch	In Reality
Sire City Zip (USA) 1998	Baby Zip (USA); 1991	Relaunch	Foggy Note
Sire City Zip (USA) 1998	Baby Zip (USA); 1991	Thirty Zip	Tri Jet
Sire City Zip (USA) 1998	Baby Zip (USA); 1991	Thirty Zip	Sail Away
Dam M'Lady Doc (USA) 2000	Doc' Leader (USA); 1986	Mr Leader	Hail To Reason
Dam M'Lady Doc (USA) 2000	Doc' Leader (USA); 1986	Mr Leader	Jolie Deja
Dam M'Lady Doc (USA) 2000	Doc' Leader (USA); 1986	With Patience	Nodouble
Dam M'Lady Doc (USA) 2000	Doc' Leader (USA); 1986	With Patience	First Chapter
Dam M'Lady Doc (USA) 2000	Smart Queen (USA); 1979	King Pellinore	Round Table
Dam M'Lady Doc (USA) 2000	Smart Queen (USA); 1979	King Pellinore	Thong
Dam M'Lady Doc (USA) 2000	Smart Queen (USA); 1979	Clever Bird	Swoon's Son
Dam M'Lady Doc (USA) 2000	Smart Queen (USA); 1979	Clever Bird	Sally Catbird (Family:1-o)
