= Regal Glory =

American racehorse

- Sire: Animal Kingdom
- Grandsire: Leroidesanimaux (BR)
- Dam: Mary's Follies
- Damsire: More Than Ready
- Sex: Mare
- Foaled: 14 February 2016
- Country: United States
- Color: Chestnut
- Breeder: Paul P. Pompa Jr.
- Owner: 1. Paul P. Pompa Jr.(until Oct. 2020); 2. Peter M. Brant (Jan. 2021 –)
- Trainer: Chad C. Brown
- Record: 23 : 13-6-0
- Earnings: $2,619,134

Major wins
- Lake Placid Stakes (2019); Lake George Stakes (2019); Kentucky Downs Ladies Turf Stakes (2020); Matriarch Stakes (2021, 2022); Pegasus World Cup; Filly & Mare Turf Invitational (2022); Jenny Wiley Stakes (2022); Just a Game Stakes (2022)

Awards
- American Champion Turf Female (2022)
- Last updated on January 27, 2023

Regal Glory (foaled February 14, 2016) is a Champion American multiple Grade I turf winning Thoroughbred racehorse. Her Grade I victories include the Matriarch Stakes twice at Del Mar and in 2022 the Jenny Wiley Stakes at Keeneland and Just A Game Stakes at Belmont Park. In 2022 she was awarded the Eclipse award as American Champion Female Turf Horse.

== Background ==
Regal Glory is a chestnut mare who was bred in Kentucky by Paul Pompa Jr., a daughter of 2011 Kentucky Derby winner Animal Kingdom out of the More Than Ready mare Mary's Follies. Regal Glory is a half sister to grade 3 winner Night Prowler and Cafe Pharoah, a Grade 3 winner in Japan. The mare raced for Paul Pompa Jr. until his death in October 2020. Paul Pompa's horses were dispersed at the Keeneland 2021 January Horses of All Ages Sale and Regal Glory was sold for US$925,000 to Peter M. Brant. Sire Animal Kingdom was relocated to stand in Japan for the 2020 breeding season but he stood at Darley in Kentucky from 2014 to 2019 during this period Regal Glory was conceived.

== Statistics ==
Date	Distance	Race	Grade	Track	Odds	Field	Finish	Winning Time	Winning (Losing) Margin	Jockey	Ref
2018 – two-year-old season
Oct 6, 2018	6 furlongs	Maiden Special Weight		Belmont Park	2.70*	12	1	1:12.02	5 1/2 lengths	Jose L. Ortiz	
Nov 11, 2018	6 furlongs	Stewart Manor Stakes		Aqueduct	1.00	9	1	1:10.94	nose	Jose L. Ortiz	
2019 – three-year-old season
Feb 3, 2019	1 mile	Sweetest Chant Stakes	III	Gulfstream Park	3.20	9	2	1:35.62	(2 1/2 lengths)	Jose L. Ortiz	
Apr 7, 2019	1 mile	Appalachian Stakes	II	Keeneland	3.10	11	2	1:39.31	(1 1/4 lengths)	Jose L. Ortiz	
Jun 1, 2019	1 mile	Penn Oaks	Listed	Penn National	0.10*	6	1	1:39.43	2 3/4 lengths	Luis Saez	
Jul 19, 2019	1 mile	Lake George Stakes	III	Saratoga	2.30*	3	1	1:36.23	1/2 length	Luis Saez	
Aug 17, 2019	1 1/16 miles	Lake Placid Stakes	II	Saratoga	2.30	6	1 (Note: Regal Glory and Varenka finished in a dead heat for first place)	1:43.68	dead heat	Luis Saez	
Oct 12, 2019	1 1/8 miles	Queen Elizabeth II Challenge Cup Stakes	I	Keeneland	8.40	8	6	1:49.54	(4 lengths)	Luis Saez	
2020 – four-year-old season
Jun 6, 2020	7 furlongs	Intercontinental Stakes	III	Belmont Park	5.90	10	2	1:22.71	(4 lengths)	Jose L. Ortiz	
Jun 27, 2020	1 mile	Just a Game Stakes	I	Belmont Park	13.70	6	4	1:35.62	(4 3/4 lengths)	Manuel Franco	
Sep 12, 2020	1 mile	Kentucky Downs Ladies Turf Stakes	III	Kentucky Downs	1.40*	7	1	1:34.34	neck	Jose L. Ortiz	
2021 – five-year-old season
Apr 11, 2021	1 mile	Plenty of Grace Stakes		Aqueduct	0.70*	5	1	1:36.49	1/2 length	Jose L. Ortiz	
Jun 5, 2021	1 mile	Just a Game Stakes	I	Belmont Park	3.75	10	4	1:33.90	(3 1/2 lengths)	Jose L. Ortiz	
Aug 8, 2021	1 mile	De La Rose Stakes	Listed	Saratoga	1.60	7	1	1:34.85	1/2 length	Jose L. Ortiz	
Oct 9, 2021	1 mile	First Lady Stakes	I	Keeneland	5.80	12	2	1:34.86	(1/2 length)	Jose L. Ortiz	
Nov 28, 2021	1 mile	Matriarch Stakes	I	Del Mar	1.60	6	1	1:35.33	2 1/2 lengths	Jose L. Ortiz	
2022 – six-year-old season
Jan 29, 2022	abt. 1 1/16 miles	Pegasus World Cup; Filly & Mare Turf Invitational	III	Gulfstream Park	0.80*	10	1	1:41.74	2 1/2 lengths	Jose L. Ortiz	
Apr 16, 2022	1 1/16 miles	Jenny Wiley Stakes	I	Keeneland	1.00*	6	1	1:40.97	1 length	Jose L. Ortiz	
Jun 11, 2022	1 mile	Just a Game Stakes	I	Belmont Park	1.40	5	1	1:32.00	3 1/2 lengths	Jose L. Ortiz	
Aug 13, 2022	1 mile	Fourstardave Handicap (Note: The Fourstardave Handicap is an event without sex restriction. Regal Glory faced male horses)	I	Saratoga	0.50*	5	2	1:34.20	(1 1/2 lengths)	Jose L. Ortiz	
Oct 8, 2022	1 mile	First Lady Stakes	I	Keeneland	1.05*	6	2	1:33.22	(1 length)	Jose L. Ortiz	
Nov 5, 2022	1 mile	Breeders' Cup Mile	I	Keeneland	10.14	14	10	1:33.96	(5 lengths)	Jose L. Ortiz	
Dec 3, 2022	1 mile	Matriarch Stakes	I	Del Mar	0.60*	8	1	1:33.60	5 1/4 lengths	Flavien Prat	

Legend:
Turf Dirt
Notes:
An (*) asterisk after the odds means Regal Glory was the post-time favorite.

== Pedigree ==
Pedigree of Regal Glory, chestnut mare, February 14, 2016
Sire Animal Kingdom (2008)	Leroidesanimaux (BR) (2000)	Candy Stripes (1982)	Blushing Groom (FR) (1974)
Sire Animal Kingdom (2008)	Leroidesanimaux (BR) (2000)	Candy Stripes (1982)	Bubble Company (FR) (1977)
Sire Animal Kingdom (2008)	Leroidesanimaux (BR) (2000)	Dissemble (1989)	Ahonoora (GB) (1975)
Sire Animal Kingdom (2008)	Leroidesanimaux (BR) (2000)	Dissemble (1989)	Kerali (GB) (1984)
Sire Animal Kingdom (2008)	Dalicia (GER) (2001)	Acatenango (GER) (1982)	Surumu (GER) (1974)
Sire Animal Kingdom (2008)	Dalicia (GER) (2001)	Acatenango (GER) (1982)	Aggravate (GB) (1966)
Sire Animal Kingdom (2008)	Dalicia (GER) (2001)	Dynamis (IRE) (1981)	Dancing Brave (1983)
Sire Animal Kingdom (2008)	Dalicia (GER) (2001)	Dynamis (IRE) (1981)	Diasprina (GER) (1986)
Dam Mary's Follies (2006)	More Than Ready (1987)	Southern Halo (1983)	Halo (1969)
Dam Mary's Follies (2006)	More Than Ready (1987)	Southern Halo (1983)	Northern Sea (1974)
Dam Mary's Follies (2006)	More Than Ready (1987)	Woodman's Girl (1990)	Woodman (1983)
Dam Mary's Follies (2006)	More Than Ready (1987)	Woodman's Girl (1990)	Becky Be Good (1981)
Dam Mary's Follies (2006)	Catch The Queen (1999)	Miswaki (1978)	Mr. Prospector (1970)
Dam Mary's Follies (2006)	Catch The Queen (1999)	Miswaki (1978)	Hopespringseternal (1971)
Dam Mary's Follies (2006)	Catch The Queen (1999)	Wave to the Queen (1986)	Wavering Monarch (1979)
Dam Mary's Follies (2006)	Catch The Queen (1999)	Wave to the Queen (1986)	Blue Ankle (1979) (family 1k)
