= Acclamation (horse) =

American-bred Thoroughbred racehorse

- Sire: Unusual Heat
- Grandsire: Nureyev
- Dam: Winning in Style
- Damsire: Silveyville
- Sex: Stallion
- Foaled: 16 May 2006
- Country: United States
- Colour: Bay
- Breeder: Old English Rancho
- Owner: Bud & Judy Johnston, Peter Hilvers, Mary Hilvers
- Trainer: Donald Warren
- Record: 30: 11–2–6
- Earnings: $1,958,048

Major wins
- Jim Murray Memorial Handicap (2010, 2011); Charles Whittingham Handicap (2010, 2011, 2012); Eddie Read Stakes (2011, 2012); Pacific Classic (2011); Clement L. Hirsch Turf Championship (2011)

Awards
- American Champion Older Male Horse (2011); Californian Horse of the Year (2011, 2012)

Acclamation (foaled 16 May 2006) is an American Thoroughbred racehorse and sire. After showing promising, but unremarkable, form in his first two seasons of racing, he emerged as a top-class turf performer in 2010 when he won the Jim Murray Memorial Handicap and the Charles Whittingham Handicap. In the following season, he improved again, repeating his wins in the Jim Murray Handicap and the Charles Whittingham Handicap and adding wins in the Eddie Read Stakes, Pacific Classic (on a synthetic track) and the Clement L. Hirsch Turf Championship. At the end of the year, he was voted American Champion Older Male Horse. In an abbreviated 2012 season, he won a third Charles Whittingham Handicap and a second Eddie Read Stakes before being retired after winning his last seven races.

== Background ==
Acclamation is a bay horse with a white star and a white sock on his left hind leg. He was bred in California by Bud Johnston's, Old English Rancho. He was sired by Unusual Heat who won the Amethyst Stakes, Glencairn Stakes and the Platinum Stakes in Ireland before becoming a successful breeding stallion in California. His dam Winning In Style was a granddaughter of Solidity, who was bought for $1,250 by Old English Rancho's founder Ellwood Johnson. She was a descendant of the broodmare Thorn Apple, making her a distant relative of I'll Have Another.

Bud Johnston raced the horse in partnership with his wife Judy and Peter and Mary Hilvers. Acclamation was trained throughout his racing career by Donald Warren and usually raced in a red shadow roll.

== Racing career ==
=== Early career ===
Acclamation began his racing career at Hollywood Park Racetrack in late 2008 when he finished unplaced in two maiden races before opening his account in a similar event on December 21.

In 2009, Acclamation began his season in allowance races finishing third at Hollywood Park and second at Del Mar racetrack before winning at Del Mar in August. He failed to win in his remaining six races that year but finished third in the Del Mar Derby, Hollywood Derby and San Gabriel Handicap.

=== 2010: four-year-old season ===
Acclamation began his third season with four races on the synthetic Cushion Track at Santa Anita, producing his best effort when finishing third to Jeranimo in the Strub Stakes on 13 February. He then moved back to the turf track at Hollywood and finished fourth in the Grade III Inglewood Handicap on April 26. On May 15, Acclamation, ridden by Christian Santiago Reyes started a 14.5/1 outsider for the Grade 2 Jim Murray Handicap over one and a half miles at the same course. He took the lead soon after the start, opened up a clear advantage and won by a race record margin of seven and a half lengths from Falcon Rock. On June 6, the horse was moved up in class to contest the Grade I Charles Whittingham Memorial Handicap over a mile and a quarter. As in his previous race, he took the lead soon after the start and maintained his advantage throughout to win by one and a half lengths from Hyades. The win was the first at the highest level for Donald Warren.

Acclamation ran poorly in his two remaining races in 2010, finishing last of nine behind Chinchon in the United Nations Stakes and sixth of seven behind The Usual Q. T. in the Eddie Read Handicap.

=== 2011: five-year-old season ===
Acclamation began his 2011 campaign by finishing fifth in the Frank E. Kilroe Mile Handicap on March 6 and then failed when tried on dirt in the Charles Town Classic finishing last of the ten runners behind Duke of Mischief after encountering what Warren described as "mud and rain and trouble on the first turn". He was never beaten again. Joel Rosario took over the ride when Acclamation returned to turf and attempted to repeat his 2010 success in the Jim Murray Handicap. He started the 7/5 favorite and won by seven lengths from Falcon Rock. After the race, Warren commented "It was a perfect plan today... as long as he's not shuffled around and bumped around. He doesn’t like to be bothered too much and doesn’t like to be hit with the stick. He's easily rateable and he's such a natural mile and one-half horse". On June 11 the horse started odds-on favorite for the Charles Whittingam Memorial and won the race for the second time, leading from the start and beating Celtic New Year by three and a half lengths. In the Eddie Read Handicap at Del Mar on July 24, Acclamation started third choice in the betting behind Caracortado and Smart Bid (Mervin H. Muniz Jr. Memorial Handicap). Acclamation took the lead from the start and set a steady pace before accelerating at halfway and drawing away to win by three and a quarter length from Jeranimo. Joel Rosario commented "I could see his ears up and going back and forth. He was just having fun out there."

Pat Valenzuela took over the ride when Acclamation was switched to the synthetic Polytrack surface for the Grade I Pacific Classic at Del Mar on August 29 and started third favorite behind Twirling Candy (Malibu Stakes, Strub Stakes, Californian Stakes), and Game On Dude. Valenzuela sent the horse into the lead from the start, setting a steady pace before accelerating approaching the final turn. He held off the strong challenge of Twirling Candy in the straight to in by a head, with the pair finishing four lengths clear of the other runners. Valenzuela, who had been given the ride by Warren for his skill at riding speed horses said "my horse stuck his neck out and fought the battle. He wouldn’t let him by."

On his final run of the season, Acclamation started odds-on favorite for the Clement L. Hirsch Turf Championship over a mile and a quarter at Santa Anita and won by three quarters of a length from the 2010 winner Champ Pegasus. After the race owner Bud Johnson said of the winner "He's a very accomplished horse. We're very proud of him." He was expected to run in the Breeders' Cup Turf or the Breeders' Cup Classic, but was ruled out for the rest of the year with a bruised foot.

=== 2012: six-year-old season ===
Acclamation returned after a lengthy absence for two races in the summer on 2012 after he had been kept of the course by several minor problems. On June 10 he took the Charles Wittingham for a third straight year, leading from the start and winning by a length from the San Marcos Handicap winner Slim Shadey, to whom he was conceding four pounds. On July 21, the horse repeated his 2011 success in the Eddie Read, making all the running and winning by two and three quarter lengths from the Argentinian import Interaction. After the race Valenzuela said "he's a great horse". "I’ve been lucky enough to ride some very good horses, champions, like Sunday Silence and Arazi, and Best Pal. And this horse is right there with them. No doubt about it." Shortly after the race Acclamation sustained a tendon injury to his left foreleg. Although he appeared to recover and was aimed at the Breeders' Cup the injury flared up again in training and he did not race again.

== Assessment and awards ==
In the Eclipse Awards for 2011, Acclamation was voted American Champion Older Male Horse, taking 95 votes ahead of Game On Dude (70) and Tizway (52). In the poll for American Champion Male Turf Horse he finished runner-up behind Cape Blanco. He was named Californian-bred Horse of the Year for both 2011 and 2012.

== Stud record ==
Acclamation was retired from racing to stand at the Old English Rancho at Sanger, California in 2013 at a fee of $20,000.

== Pedigree ==
Pedigree of Acclamation (USA), bay stallion, 2006
| Sire Unusual Heat (USA) 1990 | Nureyev (USA); 1977 | Northern Dancer | Nearctic |
| Sire Unusual Heat (USA) 1990 | Nureyev (USA); 1977 | Northern Dancer | Natalma |
| Sire Unusual Heat (USA) 1990 | Nureyev (USA); 1977 | Special | Forli |
| Sire Unusual Heat (USA) 1990 | Nureyev (USA); 1977 | Special | Thong |
| Sire Unusual Heat (USA) 1990 | Rossard (DEN); 1980 | Glacial | Pardal |
| Sire Unusual Heat (USA) 1990 | Rossard (DEN); 1980 | Glacial | Glacis |
| Sire Unusual Heat (USA) 1990 | Rossard (DEN); 1980 | Peas-Blossom | Midsummer Night |
| Sire Unusual Heat (USA) 1990 | Rossard (DEN); 1980 | Peas-Blossom | Fan Light |
| Dam Winning In Style (USA) 1988 | Silveyville (USA); 1978 | Petrone | Prince Taj |
| Dam Winning In Style (USA) 1988 | Silveyville (USA); 1978 | Petrone | Wild Miss |
| Dam Winning In Style (USA) 1988 | Silveyville (USA); 1978 | Zurina | Successor |
| Dam Winning In Style (USA) 1988 | Silveyville (USA); 1978 | Zurina | Paladrina |
| Dam Winning In Style (USA) 1988 | Lady With Style (USA); 1974 | Fleet Discovery | Fleet Nasrullah |
| Dam Winning In Style (USA) 1988 | Lady With Style (USA); 1974 | Fleet Discovery | Grass Roots |
| Dam Winning In Style (USA) 1988 | Lady With Style (USA); 1974 | Solidity | Solidarity |
| Dam Winning In Style (USA) 1988 | Lady With Style (USA); 1974 | Solidity | Datura (Family: 23-b) |
