= Big Momma =

Big Momma may refer to:

== Film ==
- Big Momma's House, a 2000 American crime comedy film directed by Raja Gosnell

== People ==
- Big Momma, a hip hop artist
- Idalia Ramos Rangel, also known as "Big Momma", a suspected drug lord

== See also ==
- Big Mama (disambiguation)
