= Spendarella =

American-bred Thoroughbred racehorse

- Sire: Karakontie (JPN)
- Grandsire: Bernstein
- Dam: Spanish Bunny
- Damsire: Unusual Heat
- Sex: Filly
- Foaled: April 27, 2019
- Country: United States
- Color: Bay
- Breeder: Gainesway Thoroughbreds
- Owner: Gainesway Stable
- Trainer: H. Graham Motion
- Record: 5: 4-1-0
- Earnings: $596,459

Major wins
- Herecomesthebride Stakes (2022); Appalachian Stakes (2022); Del Mar Oaks (2022)
- Last updated on August 22, 2022

Spendarella (foaled April 27, 2019) is an American thoroughbred racehorse who has won multiple graded stakes as a three-year-old in 2022 on the turf including Grade I Del Mar Oaks at Del Mar.

== Background ==
Spendarella is a bay filly, bred in New York State by Gainesway Thoroughbreds, the breeding arm of Gainesway Farm. Her sire is the Japanese-bred Karakontie, grandson of champion Sunday Silence. Her dam is out of the California-bred Unusual Heat mare Spanish Bunny, who broke her maiden at Del Mar in 2010. Gainesway purchased Spanish Bunny in foal to Sundarban for US$130,000 from Taylor Made Sales Agency at the 2015 Keeneland November Breeding Stock Sale. Spanish Bunny is also the dam of 2015 Grade I American Oaks and Grade II Honeymoon Stakes winner Spanish Queen, a daughter of Tribal Rule who was voted that year's champion California-bred 3-year-old filly, and Spanish Loveaffair a multiple stakes-winning full sister to Spendarella. The mare has a 2-year-old filly by Destin named Spanish Destiny and a 2022 colt by Uncle Mo.

Spendarella is trained by H. Graham Motion and owned by Gainesway Stable, the racing arm of Gainesway Farm.

== Career ==
=== 2022: three-year-old season ===
Unraced at 2, Spendarella debuted at Gulfstream Park on February 2, winning a maiden race by 2 3/4 lengths over one mile with jockey Jose Ortiz aboard.

A month later on March 5 followed that with victories in the Grade III Herecomesthebride Stakes at Gulfstream Park and the Grade II Appalachian Stakes at Keeneland. Tyler Gaffalione rode her for the first time in the Keeneland race.

At Royal Ascot, in the Group 1 Coronation Stakes Spendarella and jockey William Buick finished second, but was game in defeat to European two-year-old champion filly Inspiral, the daughter of Frankel. Trainer Motion told on TVG, "I'm thrilled with her. She's a very brave filly, and I think she proved she is a grade 1 filly today."

Spendarella was sent to the West Coast, to California where on August 20, she faced twelve other fillies in the Grade I Del Mar Oaks. Starting as the 6/5 favorite jockey Tylor Gaffalione let Spendarella lope along in third behind early fractions of :23.82 and :47.05. He had her in a perfect spot to watch the leaders Gracelund Gray and Cairo Memories and yet keep an eye out for the rest of the field. Cairo Memories took over from a fading Gracelund Gray around the final turn. As Gracelund Gray began backing up, Gafflione angled Spendarella out slightly around her. From there, Spendarella easily caught Cairo Memories entering the stretch. It was immediately obvious that no one was going to catch the invader, and Spendarella cruised home to win by 4 1/2 lengths in 1:47.09.

== Statistics ==
Date	Distance	Race	Grade	Track	Odds	Field	Finish	Winning Time	Winning (Losing) Margin	Jockey	Ref
2022 – three-year-old season
Feb 2, 2022	abt. 1 1/16 miles	Maiden Special Weight		Gulfstream Park	7.30	9	1	1:43.13	2 3/4 lengths	Jose L. Ortiz	
Mar 5, 2022	abt. 1 mile	Herecomesthebride Stakes	III	Gulfstream Park	1.70*	11	1	1:35.19	1 1/2 lengths	Jose L. Ortiz	
Apr 9, 2022	1 mile	Appalachian Stakes	II	Keeneland	0.70*	8	1	1:37.41	1 3/4 lengths	Tyler Gaffalione	
Jun 17, 2022	7 furlongs 213 yards	Coronation Stakes	I	Royal Ascot	9.00	12	2	1:39.20	(4 3/4 lengths)	William Buick	
Aug 20, 2022	1 1/16 miles	Del Mar Oaks	I	Del Mar	1.20*	13	1	1:47.09	4 1/2 lengths	Tyler Gaffalione	

Legend:
Turf Dirt
Notes:
An (*) asterisk after the odds means Spendarella was the post-time favorite.

== Pedigree ==
Pedigree of Spendarella, bay filly, April 27, 2019
Sire Karakontie (JPN) (2011)	Bernstein (1997)	Storm Cat (1983)	Storm Bird (Canada) (1978)
Sire Karakontie (JPN) (2011)	Bernstein (1997)	Storm Cat (1983)	Terlingua (1976)
Sire Karakontie (JPN) (2011)	Bernstein (1997)	La Affirmed (1983)	Affirmed (1975)
Sire Karakontie (JPN) (2011)	Bernstein (1997)	La Affirmed (1983)	La Mesa (Canada) (1974)
Sire Karakontie (JPN) (2011)	Sun Is Up (JPN) (1998)	Sunday Silence (1986)	Halo (1969)
Sire Karakontie (JPN) (2011)	Sun Is Up (JPN) (1998)	Sunday Silence (1986)	Wishing Well (1975)
Sire Karakontie (JPN) (2011)	Sun Is Up (JPN) (1998)	Moon Is Up (1993)	Woodman (1983)
Sire Karakontie (JPN) (2011)	Sun Is Up (JPN) (1998)	Moon Is Up (1993)	Miesque (1984)
Dam Spanish Bunny (2006)	Unusual Heat (1990)	Nureyev (1977)	Northern Dancer (Canada) (1961)
Dam Spanish Bunny (2006)	Unusual Heat (1990)	Nureyev (1977)	Special (1969)
Dam Spanish Bunny (2006)	Unusual Heat (1990)	Rossard (DEN) (1980)	Glacial (DEN) (1966)
Dam Spanish Bunny (2006)	Unusual Heat (1990)	Rossard (DEN) (1980)	Peas-Bottom (GB)
Dam Spanish Bunny (2006)	Spanish Beam (1997)	El Gran Senor (1981)	Northern Dancer (Canada) (1961)
Dam Spanish Bunny (2006)	Spanish Beam (1997)	El Gran Senor (1981)	Sex Appeal (1970)
Dam Spanish Bunny (2006)	Spanish Beam (1997)	Solar Beam (1991)	Majestic Light (1973)
Dam Spanish Bunny (2006)	Spanish Beam (1997)	Solar Beam (1991)	Sunerta (1984) (family 9-f)

Spendarella is inbred 5s x 4d x 4d to Northern Dancer, meaning Northern Dancer appears in the fourth generation on the dam's side twice of the pedigree and in the fifth generation on the sires's side through his son Storm Bird.
