= Herecomesthebride Stakes =

- Class: Grade III
- Location: Gulfstream Park; Hallandale Beach, Florida, United States
- Inaugurated: 1984
- Race type: Thoroughbred - Flat racing
- Website: www.gulfstreampark.com

Race information
- Distance: 1 mile
- Surface: Turf
- Track: Left-handed
- Qualification: Three-Year-Old Fillies
- Weight: 122 lbs with allowances
- Purse: $200,000 (since 2023)

The Herecomesthebride Stakes is a Grade III American Thoroughbred horse race for three year old fillies, over a distance of one mile on the turf held annually in March at Gulfstream Park, Hallandale Beach, Florida. The event currently carries a purse of $200,000.

== History ==
The inaugural running of the event was split into two divisions as the eight and ninth race in the program on 9 May 1984.

The event was named after the winning mare Herecomesthebride who in her career won twelve races from sixteen starts including the 1977 Bonnie Miss Stakes (now the Grade II Gulfstream Oaks).

The event was not held in 1990 and 1991. The event was upgraded to Grade III in 1998.

The event was not held in 2008.

However, the 2015 running was switched to dirt due to weather conditions and was ungraded.

Of the more notable winners of this event was Dayatthespa. During her three-year-old campaign she began winning this event and four more including the Grade I Queen Elizabeth II Challenge Cup. Later in her career she would win the Breeders' Cup Filly & Mare Turf and be crowned US Champion Female Turf Horse.

== Records ==
Speed record:

- 1 mile – 1:32.80 Lion Lake (IRE) (2026)
- 1 1/16 miles – 1:40:78 Dream Dancing (IRE) (2017)
- 1 1/8 miles – 1:46.49 Auntie Mame (1997)

Margins:

- 7 1/4 lengths – Cut the Charm (1994)

Most wins by a jockey

- 5 – Jerry D. Bailey (1996, 1997, 1999, 2000, 2001)

Most wins by a trainer

- 4 – H. Graham Motion (2011, 2013, 2018, 2022)
- 4 – Mark E. Casse (2016, 2017, 2024, 2025)

Most wins by an owner

- 2 – Augustin Stable (2011, 2013)
- 2 – Eclipse Thoroughbred Partners (2021, 2025)

== Winners ==
Year	Winner	Jockey	Trainer	Owner	Distance	Time	Purse	Grade	Ref
2026	Lion Lake (IRE)	Tyler Gaffalione	Brendan P. Walsh	Emcee Stable	1 mile	1:32.80	$175,000	III	
2025	Vixen	John R. Velazquez	Mark E. Casse	D. J. Stable & Eclipse Thoroughbred Partners	1 mile	1:33.57	$205,000	III	
2024	Pounce	Javier Castellano	Mark E. Casse	Resolute Racing	1 mile	1:33.17	$200,000	III	
2023	Danse Macabre	Adam Beschizza	Kelsey Danner	NBS Stable and Elements Racing	1 mile	1:37.27	$200,000	III	
2022	Spendarella	Jose L. Ortiz	H. Graham Motion	Gainesway Stable	abt. 1 mile	1:34.38	$125,000	III	
2021	† Con Lima	Irad Ortiz Jr.	Todd A. Pletcher	Eclipse Thoroughbred Partners, Joseph F. Graffeo, Eric Del Toro, Troy & Nikolaus Johnson	1 1/16 miles	1:41.30	$100,000	III	
2020	Cheermeister	Emisael Jaramillo	Armando De La Cerda	Teresa & David J. Palmer	1 1/16 miles	1:41.32	$150,000	III	
2019	Cambier Parc	Jose L. Ortiz	Chad C. Brown	OXO Equine	1 1/16 miles	1:42.03	$150,000	III	
2018	Thewayiam (FR)	Jose L. Ortiz	H. Graham Motion	Great Point Stables, Michael Dubb, The Elkstone Group & Bethlehem Stables	1 1/16 miles	1:41.41	$100,000	III	
2017	Dream Dancing	Julien R. Leparoux	Mark E. Casse	John C. Oxley	1 1/16 miles	1:40:78	$100,000	III	
2016	Catch a Glimpse	Florent Geroux	Mark E. Casse	Gary Barber, Michael James Ambler & Windways Farm	1 1/16 miles	1:42.63	$150,000	III	
2015	Devine Aida	Jesus M. Rios	Ramon Morales	Stronach Stables	1 1/16 miles	1:49.01	$150,000	Listed	
2014	Room Service	Joel Rosario	Wayne M. Catalano	Gary & Mary West	1 1/8 miles	1:46.82	$100,000	III	
2013	Kitten's Point	Edgar S. Prado	H. Graham Motion	Augustin Stable	1 1/8 miles	1:50.22	$150,000	III	
2012	Dayatthespa	Javier Castellano	Chad C. Brown	Jerry & Ronald Frankel, Steve Laymon & Bradley Thoroughbreds	1 1/8 miles	1:47.30	$150,000	III	
2011	Dynamic Holiday	Ramon A. Dominguez	H. Graham Motion	Augustin Stable	1 1/8 miles	1:47.00	$150,000	III	
2010	Khancord Kid	Rajiv Maragh	John C. Kimmel	Chester Broman & Mary R. Broman	1 1/8 miles	1:47.14	$150,000	III	
2009	Gozzip Girl	Elvis Trujillo	Thomas Albertrani	Farnsworth Stables	1 1/8 miles	1:47.25	$150,000	III	
2008	Race not held								
2007	Sharp Susan	Cornelio Velasquez	William I. Mott	WinStar Farm	1 1/8 miles	1:47.90	$107,000	III	
2006	Aunt Henny	Javier Castellano	Michael R. Matz	Erdenheim Farm	1 1/8 miles	1:46.88	$100,000	III	
2005	Cape Hope	Jose A. Santos	Dallas Stewart	Overbrook Farm	1 1/8 miles	1:48.28	$100,000	III	
2004	Lucifer's Stone	Jose A. Santos	Linda L. Rice	Team Solaris Stable	1 1/8 miles	1:52.78	$100,000	III	
2003	Gal O Gal	Christopher P. DeCarlo	Vincent L. Blengs	Max Hugel	1 1/16 miles	1:42.38	$100,000	III	
2002	Cellars Shiraz	Cornelio Velasquez	William J. Cesare	Bitterroot Investments	1 1/16 miles	1:43.21	$100,000	III	
2001	Mystic Lady	Jerry D. Bailey	Mark A. Hennig	R. Lee Lewis	1 1/16 miles	1:46.73	$111,500	III	
2000	Gaviola	Jerry D. Bailey	William H. Turner Jr.	Twilite Farms	1 1/8 miles	1:47.28	$75,000	III	
1999	Pico Teneriffe	Jerry D. Bailey	Todd A. Pletcher	Eugene Melnyk	1 1/8 miles	1:48.82	$75,000	III	
1998	Rashas Warning	Mike E. Smith	Philip A. Gleaves	Lael Stables	abt. 1 1/8 miles	1:51.44	$75,000	III	
1997	Auntie Mame	Jerry D. Bailey	Angel A. Penna Jr.	Lazy F Ranch	1 1/8 miles	1:46.49	$75,000	Listed	
1996	Lulu's Ransom	Jerry D. Bailey	Emanuel Tortora	Susan & Frank Moreno	1 1/8 miles	1:47.55	$50,000	Listed	
1995	Clever Thing	Craig Perret	Luis Olivares	Cobble View Stable	1 1/8 miles	1:53.06	$50,000	Listed	
1994	Cut the Charm	Wigberto S. Ramos	James E. Bracken	Kathy-Jo Stable	1 1/16 miles	1:43.72	$50,000	Listed	
1993	Sigrun	Rene R. Douglas	Jacqueline A. Brittain	Elaine J. Wold	1 1/16 miles	1:45.79	$50,000	Listed	
1992	Morriston Belle	Dave Penna	Frank Gomez	Paula J. Tucker	1 1/16 miles	1:42.23	$50,000	Listed	
1991	Race not held								
1990	Race not held								
1989	Darby Shuffle	Craig Perret	D. Wayne Lukas	H. Joseph Allen	1 1/16 miles	1:42.80	$60,850		
1988	Topicount	Jean-Luc Samyn	H. Allen Jerkens	Centennial Farms	1 1/16 miles	1:43.20	$67,250		
1987	Sum	Robert Woodhouse	Joseph M. Bollero	Edward A. Cox Jr.	1 1/16 miles	1:43.20	$42,350		
1986	Judy's Red Shoes	Gene St. Leon	George Gianos	Mr. & Mrs Cleo Hall	1 1/16 miles	1:43.00	$59,650		
1985	Debutant Dancer	Gerry Gallitano	James D. Frederiksen	Troy Seale	1 1/16 miles	1:42.80	$64,420		
1984	Delta Mary	Frank Anthony Pennisi	Clyde M. Kaelin	Milbert B. Collins & Jack W. Cropp	1 1/16 miles	1:42.80	$24,945		Division 1
1984	Oakbrook Lady	Jose A. Velez Jr.	Reed M. Combest	Oakbrook Stable	1 1/16 miles	1:42.00	$24,425		Division 2

Legend:
Turf Dirt
Notes: † The favorite Spanish Loveaffair was first past the post but was disqualified and placed fourth for interference into the far turn. Con Lima was declared the winner.

== See also ==
- List of American and Canadian Graded races
