= Del Mar Oaks =

Racetrack in Del Mar, California

- Class: Grade 1
- Location: Del Mar Racetrack; Del Mar, California, United States
- Inaugurated: 1957
- Race type: Thoroughbred – Flat racing
- Website: www.dmtc.com

Race information
- Distance: 1 1/8 miles (9 furlongs)
- Surface: Turf
- Track: Left-handed
- Qualification: Three-year-old fillies
- Weight: Assigned
- Purse: $300,000

The Del Mar Oaks is an American Thoroughbred horse race run annually in mid August at the Del Mar Racetrack in Del Mar, California. Open to three-year-old fillies, it is contested at a distance of one and one-eighth miles (9 furlongs) on the turf. Since 1994 it has been a Grade I event.

From its inception in 1957 through 1964, the Del Mar Oaks was raced at a distance of one mile on dirt.

It was raced in two divisions in 1966 and again in 1970.

== Records ==
Speed record: (at current distance of 1 1/8 miles)

- 1:46.26 – Amorama (2004)

Most wins by an owner:

- 4 – Howard B. Keck (1970, 1971, 1975, 1986)

Most wins by a jockey:

- 4 – Bill Shoemaker (1970, 1971, 1985, 1986)
- 4 – Chris McCarron (1979, 1984, 1989, 1991)
- 4 – Corey Nakatani (1998, 2003, 2007, 2014)

Most wins by a trainer:

- 7 – Charlie Whittingham (1970, 1971, 1975, 1979, 1982, 1986, 1991)

== Winners ==
Year	Winner	Jockey	Trainer	Owner	Time
2026	Tam Tam	Junior Alvarado	Philip A. Bauer	Rigney Racing, LLC	1:48.06
2025	Velocity	Ricardo Gonzalez	Michael W. McCarthy	Eclipse Thoroughbred Partners	1:48.45
2024	Iscreamuscream	Hector Isaac Berrios	Philip D'Amato	Agave Racing Stable	1:48.06
2023	Anisette (GB)	Umberto Rispoli	Leonard Powell	Eclipse Thoroughbred Partners	1:48.15
2022	Spendarella	Tyler Gaffalione	H. Graham Motion	Gainesway Stable	1:47.09
2021	Going Global	Flavien Prat	Philip D'Amato	CYBT, Saul Gevertz et al.	1:48.91
2020	Red Lark	Drayden Van Dyke	Patrick Gallagher	Eclipse Thoroughbred Partners	1:48.64
2019	Cambier Parc	John R. Velazquez	Chad Brown	OXO Equine LLC	1:46.75
2018	Fatale Bere	Kent Desormeaux	Leonard Powell	Benowitz Family Trust, Head of Plains Partners LLC, Mathiesen, Mark, and Powell, Mathilde	1:48.14
2017	Dream Dancing	Julien Leparoux	Mark E. Casse	John C. Oxley	1:48.06
2016	Harmonize	Junior Alvarado	William I. Mott	Larkin Armstrong	1:48.71
2015	Sharla Rae	James Graham	Doug O'Neill	Brous Stable/Barber/Wachtel Stable	1:46.58
2014	Personal Diary	Corey Nakatani	Victoria H. Oliver	Humphrey/Watts/St. George Farm Racing	1:47.56
2013	Discreet Marq	Julien Leparoux	Christophe Clement	Patricia A. Generazio	1:47.38
2012	Lady of Shamrock	Mike E. Smith	John W. Sadler	Hronis Racing	1:46.30
2011	Summer Soiree	Gabriel Saez	Graham Motion	Team Valor International	1:46.46
2010	Evening Jewel	Victor Espinoza	James Cassidy	Tom Braly	1:47.27
2009	Internallyflawless	Garrett K. Gomez	Bob Baffert	Charles E. Fipke	1:49.46
2008	Magical Fantasy	Alex Solis	Patrick Gallagher	David Bienstock, et al.	1:46.73
2007	Rutherienne	Corey Nakatani	Christophe Clement	Virginia Kraft Payson	1:46.79
2006	Arravale	Jose Valdivia Jr.	Macdonald Benson	Robert Costigan	1:48.03
2005	Singhalese	Mike E. Smith	James M. Cassidy	Gould Family Trust/Dixon	1:46.29
2004	Amorama	David Flores	Julio C. Canani	Marsha Naify et al.	1:46.26
2003	Dessert	Corey Nakatani	Richard Mandella	The Thoroughbred Corp.	1:47.04
2002	Dublino	Kent Desormeaux	Laura de Seroux	S. Port / M. Naify et al.	1:47.16
2001	Golden Apples	Garrett K. Gomez	Ben Cecil	Gary A. Tanaka	1:47.98
2000	No Matter What	Victor Espinoza	Neil D. Drysdale	Augustin Stable	1:50.02
1999	Tout Charmant	David Flores	Bob Baffert	Walter Family Trust	1:48.60
1998	Sicy D'Alsace	Corey Nakatani	Nick Canani	J. DeHaven/J. Preston et al.	1:48.26
1997	Famous Digger	Brice Blanc	Barry Abrams	Let It Ride Stable	1:49.14
1996	Antespend	Chris Antley	Ron McAnally	Jack Kent Cooke	1:48.93
1995	Bail Out Becky	Shane Sellers	William I. Mott	Ken L. & Sarah K. Ramsey	1:49.72
1994	Twice The Vice	Gary Stevens	T. Ray Bell Jr.	Bob & Beverly Lewis	1:47.73
1993	Hollywood Wildcat	Ed Delahoussaye	Neil D. Drysdale	Irving & Marjorie Cowan	1:48.31
1992	Suivi	Alex Solis	Randy Winick	Albert R. Broccoli	1:48.60
1991	Flawlessly	Chris McCarron	Charlie Whittingham	Harbor View Farm	1:49.40
1990	Slew Of Pearls	Corey Black	Edwin J. Gregson	Royal Lines	1:49.80
1989	Stylish Star	Chris McCarron	Dan L. Hendricks	M/M T. M. Cavanagh	1:48.60
1988	No Review	Rafael Meza	Chris Speckert	Buckland Farm	1:49.00
1987	Lizzy Hare	Gary Stevens	Richard L. Cross	Clover Racing et al.	1:50.40
1986	Hidden Light	Bill Shoemaker	Charlie Whittingham	Howard B. Keck	1:47.80
1985	Savannah Dancer	Bill Shoemaker	Ron McAnally	Allen E. Paulson	1:48.80
1984	Fashionably Late	Chris McCarron	Robert J. Frankel	Diana Firestone (Lessee)	1:49.40
1983	Heartlight No. One	Laffit Pincay Jr.	Pedro Marti	Burt Bacharach/C. B. Sager	1:50.20
1982	Castilla	Ray Sibille	Charlie Whittingham	Mary J. Bradley	1:50.20
1981	French Charmer	Darrel McHargue	John W. Russell	W. F. Roden	1:49.40
1980	Movin' Money	Pat Valenzuela	D. Wayne Lukas	John A. Nerud	1:49.40
1979	Our Suiti Pie	Chris McCarron	Charlie Whittingham	Mary J. Bradley	1:49.80
1978	Country Queen	Fernando Toro	Randy Winick	Maribel G. Blum	1:49.80
1977	Taisez Vous	Donald Pierce	Robert L. Wheeler	V. & A. Eachus	1:48.80
1976	Go March	Laffit Pincay Jr.	Tommy Doyle	Toshiaki Kanasashi	1:49.20
1975	Snap Apple	Francisco Mena	Charlie Whittingham	Howard B. Keck	1:50.00
1974	Modus Vivendi	Donald Pierce	Gordon C. Campbell	Bernard J. Ridder	1:50.20
1973	Sandy Blue	Donald Pierce	Tommy Doyle	Circle C Ranch & Witt	1:49.40
1972	House of Cards	Johnny Sellers	Tommy Doyle	Westerly Stud	1:50.00
1971	Turkish Trousers	Bill Shoemaker	Charlie Whittingham	Howard B. Keck	1:50.00
1970	Beja	Bill Shoemaker	Charlie Whittingham	Howard B. Keck	1:49.20
1970	Thoroly Blue	Fernando Toro	C. R. West	Chas. Weiner (Lessee)	1:50.20
1969	Commissary	Álvaro Pineda	Melvin F. Stute	Ken Schiffer	1:51.60
1968	Greta	Rudy Campas	W. F. Finnegan	Calbourne Stable	1:50.60
1967	Forgiving	Álvaro Pineda	Jerry Wallace II	M/M E. B. Johnston	1:50.80
1966	Desert Trial	Alex Maese	Carl A. Roles	Muriel Vanderbilt Adams	1:51.20
1966	Mikhaless	Álvaro Pineda	Farrell W. Jones	Albert Sultan	1:51.00
1965	Alibarb	Jerry Lambert	John W. Pappalardo	Radkovich Stock Farm	1:52.40
1964	Gim Mah	Johnny Longden	John W. Pappalardo	Radkovich / Wilson	1:36.80
1963	Hi Rated	Kenneth Church	Noble Threewitt	Kratz & Horrigan	1:36.20
1962	Savaii	Willie Harmatz	Ross Brinson	Vicar Stable	1:35.40
1961	Fun House	Robert Yanez	Robert L. Wheeler	C. V. Whitney	1:35.20
1960	Linita	Alex Maese	Clyde Turk	Corradini & Dorney	1:36.00
1959	Pie Queen	Rudy Campas	Farrell W. Jones	Hill / Hutson Ent.	1:36.40
1958	Camloc	Pete Moreno	R. D. Moon	Colin Campbell	1:36.40
1957	Royal Rasher	Ismael Valenzuela	Frank E. Childs	Mrs. Fred Turner Jr.	1:36.20
