= Flawlessly =

American-bred Thoroughbred racehorse

- Sire: Affirmed
- Grandsire: Exclusive Native
- Dam: La Confidence
- Damsire: Nijinsky II
- Sex: Filly
- Foaled: 1988
- Country: United States
- Colour: Bay
- Breeder: Harbor View Farm
- Owner: Harbor View Farm
- Trainer: Richard E. Dutrow, Jr. (1990); Charlie Whittingham (1991-1994)
- Record: 28: 16-4–3
- Earnings: $2,572,536

Major wins
- Gardenia Stakes (1990); Tempted Stakes (1990); Matriarch Stakes (1991, 1992, 1993); Del Mar Invitational Oaks (1991); San Clemente Handicap (1991); Harold C. Ramser Sr. Handicap (1991); Street Dancer Stakes (1991); Beverly Hills Handicap (1992, 1993); Ramona Handicap (1992, 1993, 1994); Beverly D. Stakes (1992)

Awards
- Kentucky-bred Turf Horse Female (1992 & 1993); American Champion Female Turf Horse (1992 & 1993)

Honours
- U.S. Racing Hall of Fame (2004); Flawlessly Stakes at Hollywood Park Racetrack
- Last updated on December 30, 2007

Flawlessly (1988–2002) was an American Thoroughbred race horse bred by Harbor View Farm. She was a daughter of 1978 Triple Crown of Thoroughbred Racing champion Affirmed and La Confidence by Nijinsky II.

At two, she trained under Dick Dutrow, winning her first stakes victories, the Tempted Stakes and the Gardenia Stakes, both Grade III events. She came third in the Grade I Frizette Stakes. At three, she was sent to California to be trained by Charlie Whittingham. With Wittingham, who chose her few races carefully, she won four turf stakes in a row. By the end of her third year, she had won five stakes, including the Grade I Matriarch Stakes, the first of her three Matriarch victories. She also finished second in the Grade I Yellow Ribbon Stakes.

Flawlessly raced for five years, from age two to six. In each season except her first, she won at least one Grade I race. Her campaigns earned her the North American distaff grass course championships of both 1992 and 1993. At age five, she earned her largest purses, but even at six, she took her third Grade I Ramona Handicap.

Throughout her career, she won three runnings of the Grade I Matriarch, three runnings of the Ramona Handicap, and two of the Grade 1 Beverly Hills Handicap, in the process defeating the best of her generation: among them champion Hollywood Wildcat and the New Zealand-bred star Let’s Elope.

Flawlessly retired having earned nearly $2.6 million, a winning campaigner on both coasts as well as the Midwest. Her 16 victories included 15 stakes races, eleven of them in graded company, and nine of them Grade 1.

== Retirement ==
Flawlessly died of kidney problems on September 26, 2002, at the age of 14. She was buried at Elmond Farm near Versailles, Kentucky. She was inducted into the Hall of Fame in 2004.
