= Kentucky Downs Ladies Turf Stakes =

- Class: Grade II
- Location: Kentucky Downs; Franklin, Kentucky, United States
- Inaugurated: 1992 (as Rachel Jackson Stakes)
- Race type: Thoroughbred – Flat racing Turf
- Sponsor: Resolute Racing (2026)
- Website: Kentucky Downs

Race information
- Distance: 1 mile
- Surface: Turf
- Track: Left-handed
- Qualification: Three years old and older
- Weight: Base weights with allowances: 4-year-olds and up: 126 lbs. 3-year-olds: 122 lbs.
- Purse: US$1,500,000 (since 2024)

The Kentucky Downs Ladies Turf Stakes is a Grade II American Thoroughbred horse race for fillies and mares that are three years old or older, over a distance of 1 mile on the turf held annually in September at Kentucky Downs racetrack in Franklin, Kentucky during their short turf meeting. The event currently carries a purse of $1,500,000 which includes $750,000 from the Kentucky Thoroughbred Development Fund.

== History ==
The race was inaugurated in 1992 as the Rachel Jackson Stakes in honor of Rachel Jackson the wife of Andrew Jackson, the 7th President of the United States. Her family moved close to the area where the Kentucky Downs racetrack is located on the border of Kentucky and Tennessee.

The event was not run for 2 years and when it resumed in 1998 it was run as the Kentucky Cup Ladies Turf Handicap. The event was renamed to its current name Ladies Turf Stakes in 2011.

In 2017 the event was upgraded to a Grade III.

With the influx of gaming revenue at Kentucky Downs the purse for the event has risen dramatically to nearly $500,000 offered by 2019.

In December 2025 it was announced by the Thoroughbred Owners and Breeders Association that the event would be upgraded to Grade II for 2026.

== Records ==
Speed record:

- 1 mile: 1:32.40 – Special Wan (IRE) (2025)

Margins:

- 3 1/2 lengths – Secret Someone (2016)

Most wins by a jockey

- 4 – Florent Geroux (2014, 2021, 2023, 2026)

Most wins by a trainer

- 4 – W. Elliott Walden (1998, 1999, 2000, 2001)

Most wins by an owner:

- 2 – Mark H. Stanley (1998. 1999)
- 2 – Barbara Hunter (1992, 2011)
- 2 – Augustin Stable (2008, 2023)

== Winners ==
Year	Winner	Age	Jockey	Trainer	Owner	Distance	Time	Purse	Grade	Ref
Ladies Turf Stakes
2026	Bless the Broken	4	Florent Geroux	Brad H. Cox	Qatar Racing, Mountmellick Farm & Hunter Valley Farm	1 mile	1:34.80	$1,492,500	II	
2025	Special Wan (IRE)	5	Joel Rosario	Brendan P. Walsh	Team Valor International & Steven Rocco	1 mile	1:32.40	$1,316,000	III	
2024	Walkathon	5	Brian Hernandez Jr.	Ian R. Wilkes	Whitham Thoroughbreds	1 mile	1:33.76	$1,494,840	III	
2023	Regal Realm	6	Florent Geroux	Jonathan Thomas	Augustin Stable	1 mile	1:37.08	$1,000,000	III	
2022	Dalika (GER)	6	Brian Hernandez Jr.	Albert Stall Jr.	Bal Mar Equine	1 mile	1:33.53	$726,580	III	
2021	Princess Grace	4	Florent Geroux	Michael Stidham	John & Susan Moore	1 mile	1:34.25	$660,000	III	
2020	Regal Glory	4	Jose L. Ortiz	Chad C. Brown	Paul P. Pompa Jr.	1 mile	1:34.34	$500,000	III	
2019	Ms Bad Behavior	4	José L. Ortiz	Richard Baltas	Sayjay Racing, G. Hall, B. Hubbard	1 mile	1:35.25	$356,320	III	
2018	Insta Erma	5	Drayden Van Dyke	Richard Baltas	Medallion Racing, Premier Racing, J. McClanahan, C. Johnson	1 mile	1:36.26	$472,780	III	
2017	Miss Temple City	5	Edgar S. Prado	H. Graham Motion	The Club Racing, Needle In A Haystack & Sagamore Farm	1 mile	1:36.91	$340,100	III	
2016	Secret Someone	5	Robby Albarado	Michael Stidham	Mt. Brilliant Stable	1 mile	1:38.00	$348,666	Listed	
2015	Kiss Moon	4	Corey J. Lanerie	David R. Vance	Carl F. Pollard	1 mile	1:36.18	$289,200	Listed	
2014	I'm Already Sexy	4	Florent Geroux	Wayne M. Catalano	Hit The Board Stables	1 mile	1:35.25	$197,000		
2013	Dancing to Town	5	Joseph Rocco Jr.	Michael R. Matz	Ramona S. Bass	1 mile	1:35.52	$161,501		
2012	Miz Ida	3	Shaun Bridgmohan	Steve Margolis	Bert, Richard & Elaine Klein	1 mile	1:50.46	$74,917		
2011	Snow Top Mountain	4	Mark Guidry	Thomas F. Proctor	Barbara Hunter	1 mile	1:39.83	$50,000		
2010	Never Retreat	5	Eduardo E. Perez	Chris M. Block	Team Block	1 mile	1:46.18	$50,000		
2009	Danzon	6	Miguel Mena	Kellyn Gorder	H. Joseph Allen	1 mile	1:40.70	$50,000		
2008	Royal Pleasure	5	Rosemary Homeister Jr.	Jonathan E. Sheppard	Augustin Stable	1 mile	1:37.23	$100,000	Listed	
2007	Quiet Royal	4	Christopher P. DeCarlo	Todd A. Pletcher	Wertheimer et Frère	1 mile	1:37.42	$100,000	Listed	
2006	Dash of Humor	6	Calvin H. Borel	Hal R. Wiggins	James D. Conway	1 mile	1:41.59	$100,000	Listed	
2005	Miss Wellspring	4	Rafael Bejarano	Gregory D. Foley	John Eaton & Steve Laymon	1 mile	1:39.20	$100,000	Listed	
2004	Sand Springs	4	Mark Guidry	Anthony L. Reinstedler	Willmott Stables	1 mile	1:36.88	$100,000	Listed	
2003	Apasionata Sonata	5	Rafael Bejarano	John T. Ward Jr.	Frederick J. Seitz	1 mile	1:37.84	$100,000	Listed	
2002	San Dare	4	Willie Martinez	Rick Hiles	David G. Mounts	1 mile	1:42.55	$100,000	Listed	
Ladies Turf Handicap
2001	Gino's Spirits (GB)	5	Pat Day	W. Elliott Walden	Rio Aventura Stables & Tom Van Meter	1 mile	1:39.16	$100,000	Listed	
2000	Silken (GB)	4	Larry Melancon	W. Elliott Walden	WinStar Farm	1 mile	1:36.16	$100,000	Listed	
1999	Pleasant Temper	5	Pat Day	W. Elliott Walden	Mark H. Stanley	1 mile	1:37.20	$100,000	Listed	
1998	Pleasant Temper	4	Larry Melancon	W. Elliott Walden	Mark H. Stanley	1 mile	1:35.20	$100,000	Listed	
1997	Race not held									
1996	Race not held									
Rachel Jackson Stakes
1995	Lady Skywalker	5	Robert Williams	Larry Donlin	Richard Gotschall	1 mile	1:37.80	$125,000	Listed	
1994	Words of War	5	Carlos Marquez Jr.	Joseph Kasperski Jr.	L. Karp, R. Stone, M. Kledzik & T. G. Teel	1 mile	1:37.20	$150,000	Listed	
1993	One Dreamer	5	Earlie Fires	Thomas F. Proctor	Glen Hill Farm	1 mile	1:37.80	$150,000	Listed	
1992	Harness Hitch	5	Shawn Payton	Steven Reiser	Barbara Hunter	1 mile	1:35.40	$150,000	Listed	

== See also ==
- List of American and Canadian Graded races
