= Matriarch Stakes =

- Class: Grade 1
- Location: Del Mar Racetrack; Del Mar, California, United States
- Inaugurated: 1981 (at Hollywood Park Racetrack)
- Race type: Thoroughbred - Flat racing
- Website: Del Mar

Race information
- Distance: 1 mile (8 furlongs)
- Surface: Turf
- Track: Left-handed
- Qualification: Fillies and mares three-year-olds and older
- Weight: Three-year-olds – 120 lbs. Older – 123 lbs.
- Purse: $300,000 (since 2023)

This article is about an American horse race. For the Australian horse race, see Matriarch Stakes (Australia).

The Matriarch Stakes is a Grade I American Thoroughbred horse race for fillies and mares that are of age three-years-old or older over a distance of one mile (8 furlongs) on the turf track scheduled annually in late November at Del Mar Racetrack in Del Mar, California. The event currently carries a purse of $300,000.

== History ==
The inaugural running of the event was on 22 November 1981 at Hollywood Park Racetrack over a distance of one and one-eighth miles on the turf and was won by the Irish-bred import Kilijaro who was ridden by US Hall of Fame jockey Laffit Pincay Jr. and trained by US Hall of Fame trainer Charles E. Whittingham defeating the 1980 United States Champion Older Female Horse Glorious Song by 2 1/2 lengths in a time of 1:47 flat. The event would be Kilijaro's last as she would be retired.

The following year the event was split in two divisions and both divisions were won by jockey Ray Sibille.

In 1983, for the third running of the event, American Graded Stakes Committee classified the event with the highest status of Grade I, a classification which the event holds today.

The 1992 US Champion Female Turf Horse Flawlessly won this event for the third time in 1993 and retaining her crown for another year as the US Champion Female Turf Horse.

In 1995 the distance of the event was increased to 1 1/4 miles with purse of $700,000. the event was run at the distance until 1998. In 1999 the distance was reverted back to 1 1/8 miles.

In 2003 the distance of the event was decreased to one mile.

The race was not run in 2005 due to problems with Hollywood Park's grass course not being ready after the turf course was reseeded.

With the closure of Hollywood Park Racetrack in 2013 the event was moved to Del Mar Racetrack.

Although the event is programmed after the Breeders' Cup many fine fillies and mares have won race. Including 1984 winner Irish-bred Royal Heroine who won the inaugural Breeders' Cup Mile and was crowned US Champion Female Turf Horse. Ryafan won the event as a three-year-old and was awarded US Champion Female Turf Horse in 1997. French-bred Starine won the event in 2001 and would win the Breeders' Cup Filly & Mare Turf the following year. British bred Intercontinental won the event in 2004 and would also win the Breeders' Cup Filly & Mare Turf the following year and become US Champion Female Turf Horse. The most recent winner of this event to win a Breeders' Cup event was British bred mare Uni who won the Breeders' Cup Mile and was also voted as US Champion Female Turf Horse for 2019.

== Records ==
Speed record:

- 1 mile: 1:33.03 – Viadera (GB) (2020)
- 1 1/8 miles: 1:46.06 – Tout Charmant (2000)
- 1 1/4 miles: 2:00.14 – Wandesta (GB) (1996)

Margins:

- 6 lengths – Squeak (GB) (1998)

Most wins:

- 3 - Flawlessly (1991, 1992, 1993)

Most wins by a jockey:

- 5 - Chris McCarron (1989, 1991, 1992, 1993, 2000)
- 5 - Joel Rosario (2014, 2017, 2018, 2020, 2023)

Most wins by a trainer:

- 8 - Robert J. Frankel (1996, 1997, 1999, 2001, 2003, 2004, 2006, 2007)

Most wins by an owner :

- 8 - Juddmonte Farms (1996, 1997, 2003, 2004, 2006, 2009, 2020, 2025)

== Winners ==
Year	Winner	Age	Jockey	Trainer	Owner	Distance	Time	Purse	Grade	Ref
At Del Mar
2025	Segesta	4	Flavien Prat	Chad C. Brown	Juddmonte Farms	1 mile	1:35.60	$302,000	I	
2024	Sacred Wish	4	John R. Velazquez	George Weaver	Black Type Thoroughbreds, Swinbank Stables, Steve Adkisson, Christopher T. Dunn & Anthony Spinazzola	1 mile	1:34.76	$303,500	I	
2023	Surge Capacity	3	Joel Rosario	Chad C. Brown	Klaravich Stables	1 mile	1:33.95	$303,500	I	
2022	Regal Glory	6	Flavien Prat	Chad C. Brown	Peter Brant	1 mile	1:33.60	$401,500	I	
2021	Regal Glory	5	Jose Ortiz	Chad C. Brown	Peter Brant	1 mile	1:33.33	$400,500	I	
2020	Viadera (GB)	4	Joel Rosario	Chad C. Brown	Juddmonte Farms	1 mile	1:33.03	$301,500	I	
2019	Got Stormy	4	Tyler Gaffalione	Mark E. Casse	Gary Barber	1 mile	1:34.24	$302,106	I	
2018	Uni (GB)	5	Joel Rosario	Chad C. Brown	Michael Dubb, Head of Plains Partners, Robert LaPenta & Bethlehem Stables	1 mile	1:34.35	$302,760	I	
2017	Off Limits (IRE)	5	Joel Rosario	Chad C. Brown	Martin S. Schwartz	1 mile	1:34.37	$302,070	I	
2016	Miss Temple City	4	Edgar S. Prado	H. Graham Motion	The Club Racing, Needle in a Haystack & Sagamore Farm	1 mile	1:35.16	$302,070	I	
2015	Stormy Lucy	6	Kent J. Desormeaux	Ed Moger Jr.	Steve Moger	1 mile	1:35.16	$302,250	I	
2014	La Tia	5	Joel Rosario	Armando De La Cerda	Salvador Hernandez	1 mile	1:35.37	$300,500	I	
At Hollywood Park
2013	Egg Drop	4	Martin Garcia	Mike R. Mitchell	Little Red Feather Racing	1 mile	1:34.03	$251,000	I	
2012	Better Lucky	3	Eddie Castro	Thomas Albertrani	Godolphin Racing	1 mile	1:34.18	$250,000	I	
2011	Star Billing	3	Victor Espinoza	John Shirreffs	George Krikorian	1 mile	1:35:45	$250,000	I	
2010	Gypsy's Warning (SAF)	5	Joel Rosario	H. Graham Motion	Team Valor International & Green Lantern Stables	1 mile	1:34.01	$250,000	I	
2009	Ventura	5	Garrett K. Gomez	Humberto Ascanio	Juddmonte Farms	1 mile	1:33.58	$300,000	I	
2008	Cocoa Beach (CHI)	4	Ramon A. Dominguez	Saeed bin Suroor	Godolphin Racing	1 mile	1:35.49	$500,000	I	
2007	Precious Kitten	4	Rafael Bejarano	Robert J. Frankel	Ken & Sarah Ramsey	1 mile	1:33.63	$500,000	I	
2006	§Price Tag (GB)	3	Edgar S. Prado	Robert J. Frankel	Juddmonte Farms	1 mile	1:34.70	$500,000	I	
2005	Race not held									
2004	Intercontinental (GB)	4	Jerry D. Bailey	Robert J. Frankel	Juddmonte Farms	1 mile	1:35.87	$500,000	I	
2003	Heat Haze (GB)	4	John R. Velazquez	Robert J. Frankel	Juddmonte Farms	1 mile	1:34.43	$500,000	I	
2002	Dress To Thrill (IRE)	3	Patrick J. Smullen	Dermot K. Weld	Moyglare Stud Farm	1 1/8 miles	1:48.31	$500,000	I	
2001	Starine (FR)	4	John R. Velazquez	Robert J. Frankel	Robert J. Frankel	1 1/8 miles	1:50.16	$500,000	I	
2000	§Tout Charmant	4	Chris McCarron	Ron McAnally	Stonerside Stable	1 1/8 miles	1:46.06	$500,000	I	
1999	Happyanunoit (NZ)	4	Brice Blanc	Robert J. Frankel	Amerman Racing Stables (Jerry & Joan Amerman)	1 1/8 miles	1:46.30	$500,000	I	
1998	Squeak (GB)	3	Alex O. Solis	Ben D. A. Cecil	Gary A. Tanaka	1 1/4 miles	2:05.08	$700,000	I	
1997	Ryafan	3	Alex O. Solis	Robert J. Frankel	Juddmonte Farms	1 1/4 miles	2:05.80	$700,000	I	
1996	Wandesta (GB)	5	Corey Nakatani	Robert J. Frankel	Juddmonte Farms	1 1/4 miles	2:00.14	$700,000	I	
1995	Duda	4	Jerry D. Bailey	William I. Mott	Mrs. Madeleine A. Paulson	1 1/4 miles	2:00.37	$700,000	I	
1994	Exchange	6	Laffit Pincay Jr.	William Spawr	Sidney H. Craig	1 1/8 miles	1:49.42	$400,000	I	
1993	Flawlessly	5	Chris McCarron	Charles E. Whittingham	Harbor View Farm	1 1/8 miles	1:46.78	$400,000	I	
1992	Flawlessly	4	Chris McCarron	Charles E. Whittingham	Harbor View Farm	1 1/8 miles	1:46.14	$400,000	I	
1991	Flawlessly	3	Chris McCarron	Charles E. Whittingham	Harbor View Farm	1 1/8 miles	1:46.60	$200,000	I	
1990	ƒ Countus In	5	Corey Nakatani	Steven M. Rieser	Charles G. Middleton III	1 1/8 miles	1:46.20	$200,000	I	
1989	Claire Marine (IRE)	4	Chris McCarron	Charles E. Whittingham	Sidney L. Port & Charles E. Whittingham	1 1/8 miles	1:47.40	$200,000	I	
1988	Nastique	4	Bill Shoemaker	Stephen A. DiMauro	Bernard Chaus & Herb Goldstein	1 1/8 miles	1:47.00	$200,000	I	
1987	Asteroid Field	4	Aaron Gryder	John Gosden	Mohammed bin Rashid Al Maktoum	1 1/8 miles	1:51.00	$200,000	I	
1986	Auspiciante (ARG)	5	Cash Asmussen	Ron McAnally	Jack Kent Cooke	1 1/8 miles	1:48.00	$200,000	I	
1985	Fact Finder	6	Sandy Hawley	Charles E. Whittingham	Nelson Bunker Hunt	1 1/8 miles	1:48.20	$200,000	I	
1984	Royal Heroine (IRE)	4	Fernando Toro	John Gosden	Robert Sangster	1 1/8 miles	1:49.40	$254,000	I	
1983	Sangue (IRE)	5	Bill Shoemaker	Henry M. Moreno	R. Charlene Parks	1 1/8 miles	1:49.40	$200,000	I	
1982	Pale Purple	4	Ray Sibille	Robert L. Wheeler	Cardiff Stud Farm	1 1/8 miles	1:48.60	$172,100		Division 1
1982	Castilla	3	Ray Sibille	Charles E. Whittingham	Mary Jones Bradley	1 1/8 miles	1:47.40	$172,100		Division 2
1981	Kilijaro (IRE)	5	Laffit Pincay Jr.	Charles E. Whittingham	Edward Seltzer, Peter M. Brant et al.	1 1/8 miles	1:47.00	$221,600		

Legend:
Turf
Notes:
§ Ran as an entry
ƒ Ran as field entrty

== See also ==
List of American and Canadian Graded races
