= Jim Murray Memorial Handicap =

- Class: Grade II
- Location: Hollywood Park Racetrack; Inglewood, California, United States
- Inaugurated: 1990
- Race type: Thoroughbred - Flat racing
- Website: www.hollywoodpark.com

Race information
- Distance: 1 1/2 miles (12 furlongs)
- Surface: Turf
- Track: Left-handed
- Qualification: Three-year-olds & up
- Weight: Assigned
- Purse: United States dollar$150,000

The Jim Murray Memorial Handicap is an American Thoroughbred horse race run in mid-May at Hollywood Park Racetrack in Inglewood, California. The Grade II event is open to horses, age three and up, willing to race one and one-half miles on turf.

The race was run at one and one-quarter miles (10 furlongs) in 1990, 1999 and 2000.

== Records ==
Speed record: (at current distance of 1 1/2 miles)

- 2:25.31 - Storming Home (GB) (2003)

Most wins:

- 2 - On the Acorn (GB) (2007, 2008)
- 2 - Acclamation (2010, 2011)

Most wins by a jockey:

- 3 - Corey Nakatani (1992, 1998, 1999)
- 3 - Gary Stevens (1991, 1997, 2003)

Most wins by a trainer:

- 6 - Robert Frankel (1990, 1992, 1993, 1994, 1998, 2002)

Most wins by an owner:

- 4 - Juddmonte Farms (1990, 1992, 1993, 2002)

== Winners of the Jim Murray Memorial Handicap ==
Year	Winner	Age	Jockey	Trainer	Owner	Time
2011	Acclamation	5	Joel Rosario	Donald Warren	The Johnstons/Hilvers	2:25.63
2010	Acclamation	4	Christian Santiago Reyes	Donald Warren	E. W. & Judy Johnston	2:26.59
2009	NO RACE					
2008	On the Acorn (GB)	7	Brice Blanc	Mike Mitchell	Indizguys Stable	2:27.36
2007	On the Acorn (GB)	6	Victor Espinoza	Mike Mitchell	Indizguys Stable	2:29.07
2006	Grey Swallow (IRE)	5	Alex Solis	Dermot Weld	Vega & Weld	2:27.33
2005	Runaway Dancer	6	Garrett Gomez	Dan Hendricks	R L Stables	2:26.75
2004	Rhythm Mad (FR)	4	Alex Solis	Bruce Headley	Four Star Stables, Headley, et al.	2:26.73
2003	Storming Home (GB)	5	Gary Stevens	Neil Drysdale	Maktoum bin Rashid Al Maktoum	2:25.31
2002	Skipping (GB)	5	Kent Desormeaux	Robert Frankel	Juddmonte Farms	2:26.23
2001	Kudos	4	Eddie Delahoussaye	Richard Mandella	Jerry & Ann Moss	2:26.74
2000†	Bienamado	4	Chris McCarron	J. Paco Gonzalez	McCaffery, Toffan & Sangster	1:58.93
1999†	Lazy Lode (ARG)	5	Corey Nakatani	Richard Mandella	The Thoroughbred Corporation	2:01.44
1998	Côte d'Azur (IRE)	4	Corey Nakatani	Robert Frankel	Edmund A. Gann	2:30.23
1997	Percutant (GB)	6	Gary Stevens	Jean-Pierre Dupuis	Harlequin Stable & Diane Keith	2:26.10
1996	Polish Admiral (GB)	5	Brice Blanc	Richard Cross	Samantha, Jan and Mace Siegel	2:26.13
1995	Jahafil (GB)	7	Chris McCarron	Sanford Shulman	Charles & Clear Valley Stables	2:25.45
1994	Mashaallah	6	Laffit Pincay, Jr.	Robert Frankel	Jorge Cardemil	2:25.37
1993	Toulon (GB)	5	Eddie Delahoussaye	Robert Frankel	Juddmonte Farms	2:26.67
1992	Berillon (GB)	5	Corey Nakatani	Robert Frankel	Juddmonte Farms	2:26.80
1991	Sahib's Light	5	Gary Stevens	Richard Cross	Giovanni Saibene	2:25.90
1990†	Shotiche	4	Corey Black	Robert Frankel	Juddmonte Farms	2:00.60

† Run at ten furlongs in 1990, 1999 and 2000.
