= Mashaallah (horse) =

American-bred Thoroughbred racehorse

- Sire: Nijinsky
- Grandsire: Northern Dancer
- Dam: Homespun
- Damsire: Round Table
- Sex: Stallion
- Foaled: 9 March 1988
- Country: USA
- Colour: bay
- Breeder: William Stamps Farish III
- Owner: Ahmed Al Maktoum
- Trainer: John Gosden
- Record: 22: 8-3-1
- Earnings: £435,135

Major wins
- Gran Premio di Milano (1992), Grosser Preis von Baden (1992); Irish St. Leger (1992); Jim Murray Memorial Handicap (1994)

Mashaallah was an American-bred, British-trained Thoroughbred race horse. He is notable for his performances in 1992 when he won Group One races in Italy, Germany and Ireland.

== Background ==
Mashaallah was bred in Kentucky by William Stamps Farish III. He was sired by the Triple Crown winner Nijinsky out of the Round Table mare Homespun. He was thus a full brother of the Oak Leaf Stakes winner Folk Art and the minor stakes winner Sportin' Life. He is inbred 4x4 to Nearco, meaning that this stallion appears twice in the fourth generation of Mashaallah's pedigree (see below).

As a yearling Mashaallah was sold for $525,000 at the 1989 Keeneland July Sale. He was trained throughout his career by John Gosden at Newmarket, Suffolk.

His name derives from the Arabic saying Masha'Allah- "whatever God wills".

== Racing career ==
=== 1991: three-year-old season ===
Mashaallah was a late-maturing colt who did not appear on the racecourse until June of his three-year-old season, when he ran unplaced in a minor race at Sandown. Two weeks later he beat twenty runners to record his first win at Doncaster. He appeared to be improving when he "easily" won a handicap at York in July, but was then off the course for almost ten months.

=== 1992: four-year-old season ===
1992 saw Mashaallah improve from a modest handicapper- rated 96- to a three-time Group One winner capable of competing and winning at the highest level in middle and long-distance races. In May he ran three times, winning a handicap at the Newmarket Guineas meeting, running second in the Listed Aston Park Stakes at Newbury, and then holding off Glity by a head in the Listed Prix de la Porte de Madrid at Longchamp.

Mashaallah was then moved straight into Group One company to face an international field in the Gran Premio di Milano. Ridden by Steve Cauthen, Mashaallah took the lead two furlongs from the finish and ran on strongly to beat the French-trained filly Saganeca by three-quarters of a length. Mashaallah was then placed in the Princess of Wales's Stakes and the Prix Maurice de Nieuil before disappointing when finishing last of the six runners in the Aral-Pokal at Gelsenkirchen.

In September, however, Mashaallah produced the best form of his career. He returned to Germany for the Grosser Preis von Baden in which he led from the start to win by one and a quarter lengths from the German Horse of the Year Platini. He was then sent to Ireland for the Irish St. Leger at the Curragh, where he faced a field of top-class stayers including Vintage Crop (Melbourne Cup), Drum Taps (Ascot Gold Cup x2), Snurge (St Leger, Canadian International) and Rock Hopper (Hardwicke Stakes x2). He was sent into the lead by Cauthen half a mile from home and ran on well under pressure to beat Snurge by a neck.

In his final two races of the season Mashaallah finished unplaced in the Prix de l'Arc de Triomphe and the Canadian International Stakes.

=== 1993: five-year-old season ===
Mashaallah ran six times in 1993, but was unable to recapture his best form, and recorded his only win when he was dropped in class to take a minor stakes race at York

His best performance of the year came at Longchamp in October, where he led for most of the way in the Prix Royal Oak, but was caught in the last strides and beaten a short neck by Raintrap.

=== 1994: six-year-old season ===
Mashhallah's finished unplaced in two Grade I turf races at Hollywood Park in 1994 but won the Grade III Jim Murray Memorial Handicap.

== Assessment ==
Mashaallah's highest Racing Post Rating (RPR) was 124.

== Stud career ==
After his retirement, Mashaallah was exported to Chile where he stood as a sire at the Haras Carioca. He has sired a number of winners, but nothing of top class.

== Pedigree ==
Pedigree of Mashaallah (USA), bay stallion, 1988
Sire Nijinsky (CAN) 1967	Northern Dancer; 1977	Nearctic	Nearco*
Sire Nijinsky (CAN) 1967	Northern Dancer; 1977	Nearctic	Lady Angela
Sire Nijinsky (CAN) 1967	Northern Dancer; 1977	Natalma	Native Dancer
Sire Nijinsky (CAN) 1967	Northern Dancer; 1977	Natalma	Almahmoud
Sire Nijinsky (CAN) 1967	Flaming Page; 1959	Bull Page	Bull Lea
Sire Nijinsky (CAN) 1967	Flaming Page; 1959	Bull Page	Our Page
Sire Nijinsky (CAN) 1967	Flaming Page; 1959	Flaring Top	Menow
Sire Nijinsky (CAN) 1967	Flaming Page; 1959	Flaring Top	Flaming Top
Dam Homespun (USA) 1969	Round Table; 1954	Princequillo	Prince Rose
Dam Homespun (USA) 1969	Round Table; 1954	Princequillo	Cosquilla
Dam Homespun (USA) 1969	Round Table; 1954	Knight's Daughter	Sir Cosmo
Dam Homespun (USA) 1969	Round Table; 1954	Knight's Daughter	Feola
Dam Homespun (USA) 1969	Gal I Love; 1959	Nasrullah	Nearco*
Dam Homespun (USA) 1969	Gal I Love; 1959	Nasrullah	Mumtaz Begum
Dam Homespun (USA) 1969	Gal I Love; 1959	Gallita	Challenger
Dam Homespun (USA) 1969	Gal I Love; 1959	Gallita	Gallette (Family: 17-b)

Mashaallah was inbred 4x4 to Nearco.
