= Pegasus World Cup Filly and Mare Turf Invitational =

- Class: Grade II
- Location: Gulfstream Park; Hallandale Beach, Florida, United States
- Inaugurated: 2001 (as Marshua's River Stakes)
- Race type: Thoroughbred – Flat racing – Turf
- Sponsor: Thoroughbred Aftercare Alliance (since 2022)
- Website: Gulfstream Park

Race information
- Distance: 1 1/16 miles
- Surface: Turf
- Track: Left-handed
- Qualification: Invitational – Fillies and mares, four years old or older
- Weight: 123 lbs with allowances
- Purse: US$500,000 (2022)

The Pegasus World Cup Filly and Mare Turf Invitational is a Grade II American Thoroughbred horse race for invited fillies and mares that are four years old or older, over a distance of 1 1/16 miles on the turf held annually in January at Gulfstream Park, Hallandale Beach, Florida. The event currently carries a purse of $500,000.

== History ==
The race was inaugurated in 14 March 2001 as the Marshua's River Stakes over a much shorter distance of about 5 furlongs and named after the winning mare Marshua's River who won nine races in her career including the Grade III Suwannee River Stakes.

The event has been run at the current distance of 1 1/16 miles since 2005.

The event was upgraded to a Grade III event in 2011.

In 2021 the event was run over a distance of 1 mile.

In 2022 Gulfstream Park administration rebranded the event as part of the Pegasus World Cup and renamed the event as Pegasus World Cup Filly and Mare Turf Invitational with a significant increase in the purse to $500,000. The distance of the event was reverted back to 1 1/16 miles.

In 2024 the event was upgraded by the Thoroughbred Owners and Breeders Association to a Grade II.

== Records ==
Speed record:

- 1:39.56 – Sandiva (2017)

Margins:

- 6 1/4 lengths – Dance the Slew (2003)

Most wins:

- 2 – Sandiva (IRE) (2016, 2017)

Most wins by a jockey

- 3 – Javier Castellano (2016, 2017, 2019)

Most wins by a trainer

- 4 – Christophe Clement (2004, 2007, 2014, 2015)

Most wins by an owner:

- 2 – Al Shaqab Racing (2016, 2017)

== Winners ==
Year	Winner	Jockey	Trainer	Owner	Distance	Time	Purse	Grade	Notes
Pegasus World Cup Filly and Mare Turf Invitational
2026	Destino d'Oro	Junior Alvarado	Brad H. Cox	Steve Landers Racing LLC	1 1/16 miles	1:40.33	$490,500	II	
2025	Be Your Best (IRE)	Edgard J. Zayas	Saffie A. Joseph, Jr.	Michael J. Ryan	1 1/16 miles	1:39.06	$470,880	II	
2024	Didia (ARG)	José Ortiz	Ignacio Correas IV	Merriebelle Stable	1 1/16 miles	1:40.90	$500,000	II	
2023	Queen Goddess	Luis Saez	Michael McCarthy	Eclipse Thoroughbred Partners & Gary Barber	1 1/16 miles	1:41.91	$500,000	III	
2022	Regal Glory	José Ortiz	Chad C. Brown	Peter M. Brant	abt. 1 1/16 miles	1:41.74	$490,500	III	
Marshua's River Stakes
2021	Zofelle (IRE)	Tyler Gaffalione	Brendan Walsh	Heider Family Stables	1 mile	1:32.42	$125,000	III	
2020	Magic Star	Irad Ortiz Jr.	Chad C. Brown	Don Alberto Stable	1 1/16 miles	1:39.67	$150,000	III	
2019	Bellavais	Javier Castellano	Todd A. Pletcher	Bortolazzo Stable	1 1/16 miles	1:41.98	$150,000	III	
2018	Ultra Brat	Nik Juarez	H. Graham Motion	Alex G. Campbell Jr.	1 1/16 miles	1:45.35	$150,000	III	
2017	Sandiva (IRE)	Javier Castellano	Todd A. Pletcher	Al Shaqab Racing	1 1/16 miles	1:39.56	$150,000	III	
2016	Sandiva (IRE)	Javier Castellano	Todd A. Pletcher	Al Shaqab Racing	1 1/16 miles	1:42.04	$150,000	III	
2015	Parranda	John R. Velazquez	Christophe Clement	China Horse Club	1 1/16 miles	1:42.53	$150,000	III	
2014	Naples Bay	Joe Bravo	Christophe Clement	Edward A. Cox Jr.	1 1/16 miles	1:41.73	$100,000	III	
2013	Hard Not to Like	Joseph Rocco Jr.	Michael R. Matz	Garland Williamson	1 1/16 miles	1:41.70	$100,000	III	
2012	Heavenly Landing	Corey J. Lanerie	Eddie Kenneally	Summerplace Farm	1 1/16 miles	1:41.70	$100,000	III	
2011	Justaroundmidnight (IRE)	Joe Bravo	Patrick L. Biancone	Mrs. Paul Shanahan	1 1/16 miles	1:40.27	$100,000	III	
2010	Waquoit's Love	René R. Douglas	Timothy A. Hills	Stuart S. Janney III	1 1/16 miles	1:41.18	$100,000	Listed	
2009	Quiet Harbor	Eddie Castro	Claude R. McGaughey III	Dennis J. Federico	1 1/16 miles	1:41.02	$100,000	Listed	
2008	Race not held								
2007	Bright Abundance	Kent J. Desormeaux	Christophe Clement	Jon & Sarah Kelly	1 1/16 miles	1:39.77	$75,000	Listed	
2006	My Lordship	Cornelio H. Velasquez	William I. Mott	Live Oak Plantation	1 1/16 miles	1:40.48	$75,000	Listed	
2005	Angela's Love	Kieren Fallon	Dale L. Romans	Bill & Vicki Poston	1 1/16 miles	1:39.39	$60,000		
2004	Dedication (FR)	Edgar S. Prado	Christophe Clement	Mrs. Alec Head	1 mile	1:37.87	$67,350		
2003	Dance the Slew	Mark Guidry	Mark Shuman	Michael J. Gil	1 mile & 70 yards	1:42.44	$52,700		Off turf
2002	Flying Birdie	José Alberto Rivera	Happy Alter	Alter's Racing Stable	5 furlongs	56.38	$75,000	Listed	
2001	Elvi Gamble	José A. Vélez Jr.	George K. Angelopoulos	My Tarapsa Farm	abt. 5 furlongs	55.84	$84,325	Listed	

Legend:
Turf Dirt

== See also ==
- List of American and Canadian Graded races
