= Unusual Heat (horse) =

American-bred Thoroughbred racehorse

- Sire: Nureyev
- Grandsire: Northern Dancer
- Dam: Rossard (Den.)
- Damsire: Glacial
- Sex: Stallion
- Foaled: New Years Day, 1990
- Died: May 17, 2017 (aged 27)
- Country: United States
- Colour: Dark Bay
- Owner: The Unusual Heat Syndicate
- Trainer: Dermot Weld; Richard Mandella; Barry Abrams
- Record: 16: 6-2-2
- Earnings: $143,707

Awards
- Champion Sire of California Conceived Foals by Earnings (2008, 2009, 2010, 2011, 2012, 2013); Champion Sire of California Conceived Foals by Turf Earnings (2004,2005,2006,2007,2008,2009,2010,2011,2012,2013,2014)
- Last updated on April 20, 2015

Unusual Heat (January 1, 1990 – May 17, 2017) was a Thoroughbred stallion owned by a syndicate headed by California breeder/owner Madeline Auerbach in conjunction with California trainer Barry Abrams. In 2015, he had a full book and stood for $20,000 (lfg). From 2011 through 2015, he stood at Harris Farms in Coalinga, California.

== Pedigree ==
Unusual Heat stood 16 hands (64 inches, 163 cm) tall and was officially a dark bay or brown horse according to The Jockey Club of America. He was foaled in 1990.

Unusual Heat was by Nureyev out of the Glacial mare Rossard (Den). Nureyev produced notable offspring including champions Theatrical, Miesque, Heart Lake, and Spinning World. Rossard was a Group 1 winning mare in Europe and a Grade 1 winner in North America. He is the only stakes-winning foal out of Rossard.

== Race record ==
Unusual Heat was a multiple stakes race winner of $143,707. He won six races between the ages of 2 and 6. His most notable victories were the 1993 Amethyst Stakes and 1994 Platinum Stakes. He was trained in his racing career by Dermot Weld, Richard Mandella, and Barry Abrams.

== At stud ==
Unusual Heat retired from racing in 1996 and has stood at stud since 1998. He currently has 15 crops of racing age with career earnings of over $47.1 Million. His accomplishments at stud hold the California breeding record for progeny earnings in a single year with $5,827,513 in 2008. He followed that up with progeny earnings of $5,184,194 in 2009 and was the leading California-based sire of 2010 with earnings in excess of $2.8 million.

Unusual Heat produced 47 stakes winners including 4 Grade 1 winners, 1 Group 1 winner (Mexico), and 7 other graded stakes winners. He has sired 134 winners of $100,000 or more and 67 winners of $200,000 or more out of 505 lifetime starters. According to the California Thoroughbred Breeders Association in its August 2010 issue of California Thoroughbred, he ranks #1 in its list of All Time Leading Lifetime Sires in California. He won six California Sire Earnings Championships consecutively from 2008 to 2013 and has been the leading Turf sire in California every year since 2004, giving him eleven consecutive California Conceived Sire Turf Championships. He is also the All Time Leading Sire of California Breds by Earnings with total earnings of over $46.8 million.

Unusual Heat has recorded six Del Mar Summer Meet Sire Championships, five Santa Anita Winter Meet Sire Championships and holds the all-time record for wins by a sire at a Santa Anita Park Winter Meet, with 28 in 2009.

Unusual Heat was euthanized on May 17, 2017, due to complications of arthritis-induced laminitis.

== Progeny ==
Unusual Heat's notable progeny include:

- Acclamation- Winner of the 2011 Eclipse Award Older Male Hollywood Park, 2011 and 2012 California Horse of the Year, six-time California Champion, 2010 and 2011 Spring-Summer Meeting Turf Horse of The Meet, Multiple Grade 1 and Grade 2 winner. Acclamation has won the 2010 and 2011 Jim Murray Handicap (Grade 2), the 2010 and 2011 Charles Whittingham Hndcp (Grade 1) and the 2011 and 2012 Eddie Read Stakes (Grade 1), the 2011 $1,000,000 TVG Pacific Classic (Grade 1) and the 2011 Clement L. Hirsch Turf Championship (Grade 2). He is currently standing at stud at Old English Rancho in Sanger, CA.
- The Usual Q.T. (Deceased)- 2009 and 2010 California Champion, Dual Grade 1 winner, 3rd in the 2010 Breeders' Cup Mile, 2009 Hollywood Park 3 Year Old The Fall Meet, 2010 Del Mar Turf Horse of The Meet, 2nd in 2010 Woodbine Mile and 4th in 2010 Dubai Duty Free, Millionaire
- Unusual Suspect- Grade 1 Winner (2010 Hollywood Turf Cup), 5 time stakes champion, won stakes at every major California racetrack in his career (Santa Anita Park, Del Mar, Hollywood Park, Bay Meadows and Golden Gate Fields), millionaire, currently standing at Moorookyle Park Thoroughbreds in Australia.
- Lethal Heat- 2008 and 2009 California Champion, 2008/2009 Valkyr Trophy winner, Multiple Graded Stakes Stakes winner, 2008 Del Mar Awards winner, Former Del Mar 7F Track Record Holder, 2009 Breeders' Cup Ladies Classic participant
- Golden Doc A- 2007/2008 Valkyr Trophy winner, Grade 1 winner of the 2008 Las Virgines Stakes at Santa Anita Park. Ran 4th in the 2008 Kentucky Oaks.
- Gervinho- 2013 California Champion 3-year-old male, multiple stakes winner including the 2013 Grade 2 Sir Beaufort Handicap. Finished 5th in the 2012 Breeders' Cup Juvenile Turf. Currently standing at stud at Tommy Town Thoroughbreds in Santa Ynez, CA.
- Tucked Away (Deceased)- Unusual Heat's first graded stakes champion, winner of the 2005 Clement L. Hirsch Stakes at Del Mar.
- Burns (Deceased)- 2011 California Champion 3 Year Old Male. Winner of the 2011 Grade 2 La Jolla Handicap at Del Mar.
- Pretty Unusual (Deceased)- A dual stakes winner including beating Eclipse Award winner Stardom Bound in the 2010 El Encino Stakes (Grade 2) at Santa Anita Park.
- Lightmyfirebaby- A Grade 3 stakes winner and multiple stakes winner in Southern California.
- Betty's Bambino- Won the Grade 3 Daytona Stakes and multiple stakes winner down the hill at Santa Anita Park.
- Unusual Heatwave- 2012 California Champion 3-year-old male and a multiple stakes winner at ages 3 and 5. Currently standing at stud at Tommy Town Farms in Santa Ynez, CA.
- Lennyfromalibu- First crop multiple stakes winner, former Santa Anita Park 6.5F turf course record holder. Currently retired at Tranquility Farm in Cottonwood, CA.
- Add Heat- Former Santa Anita Park 1¼ mile track record holder and 2008 Breeders' Cup Marathon entrant.
- Starspangled Heat- Grade 2 placed and the only Unusual Heat entered in multiple Breeders' Cup races (2012 and 2014). Currently retired at Old Friends Farm in Georgetown, KY.
- Hot Chaco- Current Santa Rosa Racecourse 1 mile turf course record holder, Grade 3 placed.
- Lakerville- Stakes winning son who currently stands at stud alongside Unusual Heat at Harris Farms in Coalinga, CA.
- Other stakes winners include Bel Air Sizzle, Mensa Heat, He B Fire N Ice, America's Friend, Boozer, Heat Du Jour, Unusual Way, Unusual Hottie, Scrofa, Spenditallbaby, Runforthemoneybaby, Juliesugardaddy, Thermal Ablasion, Maui Mark, Mr. Chairman, U'narack, Brushburn, Pass The Heat, Unusual Smoke, Christiana's Heat, Medzendeekron and Surf Cup.
