= Big Mama =

Big Mama may refer to:

== Arts and music ==
- Big Mama, a character in the 2018 cartoon series Rise of the Teenage Mutant Ninja Turtles
- Big Mama (film), a 2000 Oscar-winning American film about grandparents raising their grandchildren
- Big Mama (band), a band of four female pop/R&B singers in South Korea
- "Big Mama" (song), by Latto
- Big Mama (album), 2026 Latto album
- Big Mama (EP), 2026 Flying Lotus EP
- Big Mama, a character in the 1981 film The Fox and the Hound
- Big Mama, a character in the anime and manga series Sorcerer Hunters
- Big Mama, a nickname of EVA in Metal Gear Solid 4: Guns of the Patriots
- Big Mama, a nickname of Josephine Joseph, matriarchal character in the Soul Food film and television series
- "Big Mama (Unconditional Love)", a song by LL Cool J from his 2002 album 10
- Big Mama Thornton (1926–1984), American blues singer
- BigMama, the stage name of Italian rapper Marianna Mammone (born 2000)

== Other ==
- Big Mama, a name for Mary, mother of Jesus in the Mama Tata religion
- Big Mama, a nickname of JoAnne Carner, former LPGA golfer
- Big mama, a colloquial name for Internet censors on web bulletin boards in the People's Republic of China
- "Big Mama", a nickname given to a specimen of Citipati

== See also ==
- Big Momma's House, a 2000 series of American comedy films
- Chinese dama, a term that refers to Chinese middle-aged women
