= Sweetest Chant Stakes =

- Class: Grade III
- Location: Gulfstream Park; Hallandale Beach, Florida, United States
- Inaugurated: 1986
- Race type: Thoroughbred – Flat racing – Turf
- Website: Gulfstream Park

Race information
- Distance: 1 1/16 miles
- Surface: Turf
- Track: Left-handed
- Qualification: Fillies, three years old
- Weight: 123 lbs with allowances
- Purse: US$175,000 (2023)

The Sweetest Chant Stakes is a Listed American Thoroughbred horse race for three year old fillies, over a distance of one and one-sixteenth miles on the turf held annually in late January or early February at Gulfstream Park, Hallandale Beach, Florida. The event currently carries a purse of $175,000.

== History ==
The race was inaugurated in 1986 and was run on the dirt and named after the winning mare Sweetest Chant who won twelve races in her career including the Grade II Orchid Stakes.

The event has been run at several different distances the current distance of one mile and on the turf since 2009 after a lengthy absence of nine years.

The event was upgraded to a Grade III event in 2015.

The distance for the event was increased to 1 1/16 miles in 2022.

In 2025 the event was downgraded by the Thoroughbred Owners and Breeders Association to Listed status.

== Records ==
Speed record:

- 1 1/16 miles: 1:39.36 – Life's an Audible (2024)
- 1 mile: 1:34.20 – Premier Steps (IRE) (2013)

Margins:

- 8 lengths – Natania (1986)

Most wins by a jockey

- 4 – José A. Santos (1992, 1994, 1995, 1997)

Most wins by a trainer

- 6 – Chad C. Brown (2012, 2013, 2014, 2015, 2016, 2017)

Most wins by an owner

- 3 – Klaravich Stables & William Lawrence (2014, 2015, 2016)

== Winners ==
Year	Winner	Jockey	Trainer	Owner	Distance	Time	Purse	Grade	Ref
2026	Sister Troienne	Mario Gutierrez	Brian A. Lynch	Woodslane Racing	1 1/16 miles	1:40.76	$150,000	Listed	
2025	Vixen	John R. Velazquez	Mark E. Casse	D. J. Stable & Eclipse Thoroughbred Partners	1 1/16 miles	1:40.32	$148,500	Listed	
2024	Life's an Audible	Irad Ortiz Jr.	Todd A. Pletcher	Repole Stables	1 1/16 miles	1:39.36	$175,000	III	
2023	Cairo Consort	Irad Ortiz Jr.	Todd A. Pletcher	Repole Stable & Town And Country Racing	1 1/16 miles	1:40.95	$175,000	III	
2022	Opalina	Luis Saez	Roderick R. Rodriguez	Teneri Farm & J Stables	abt. 1 1/16 miles	1:41.56	$100,000	III	
2021	White Frost	Junior Alvarado	William I. Mott	Gainesway Stable	1 mile	1:34.45	$100,000	III	
2020	Cheermeister	Emisael Jaramillo	Armando De La Cerda	Teresa & David Palmer	1 mile	1:37.25	$100,000	III	
2019	A Bit Special (GB)	Julien R. Leparoux	Patrick L. Biancone	Linda Shanahan, Mrs. M.V. & J.P. Magnier	1 mile	1:35.62	$100,000	III	
2018	Thewayiam (FR)	José L. Ortiz	H. Graham Motion	Great Point Stables, The Elkstone Group, Bethlehem Stables	1 mile	1:36.90	$100,000	III	
2017	Rymska (FR)	Joel Rosario	Chad C. Brown	Sheep Pond Part., A. Jathiere, T. Coleman, N. Herrick	1 mile	1:35.04	$100,000	III	
2016	Pricedtoperfection	Joel Rosario	Chad C. Brown	Klaravich Stables & William Lawrence	1 mile	1:36.98	$100,000	III	
2015	Consumer Credit	Edgard J. Zayas	Chad C. Brown	Klaravich Stables & William Lawrence	1 mile	1:35.80	$100,000	III	
2014	Ready to Act	Javier Castellano	Chad C. Brown	Klaravich Stables & William Lawrence	1 mile	1:36.97	$100,000	Listed	
2013	Premier Steps (IRE)	Javier Castellano	Chad C. Brown	Swift Thor., Vintage Thor., Kisber & Bradley Thor.	1 mile	1:34.20	$100,000	Listed	
2012	Dayatthespa	Javier Castellano	Chad C. Brown	J. Frankel, R. Frankel, S. Laymon & Bradley Thor.	1 mile	1:34.43	$100,000	Listed	
2011	Kathmanblu	Julien R. Leparoux	Kenneth G. McPeek	Five D Thoroughbreds & Wind River Stable	1 mile	1:39.14	$100,000	Listed	
2010	Sassy Image	Robby Albarado	Dale L. Romans	Jerry Romans	1 mile	1:37.42	$98,000	Listed	On dirt
2009	Oilgonewile	Wesley Henry	Joseph G. Calascibetta	C. Bishop, R. Crichton, S. Screnci & W. Ebanks	1 mile	1:36.24	$100,000	Listed	
2001–2008		Race not held							
2000	Capital Request	Robbie Davis	Julian Canet	Herman Wilensky	1 1/16 miles	1:40.91	$75,000	III	
1999	Pico Teneriffe	Jerry D. Bailey	Todd A. Pletcher	Eugene Melnyk	abt. 1 1/16 miles	1:45.46	$75,000	III	
1998	Quick Lap	Pat Day	Neil J. Howard	William S. Farish III	1 1/16 miles	1:42.80	$75,000	Listed	
1997	Reach the Top	José A. Santos	Mary E. Eppler	Samuel H. Rogers Jr.	1 1/16 miles	1:43.20	$75,000	Listed	
1996	Careless Heiress	Shane Sellers	Jimmy Croll	Sibling Stables	1 1/16 miles	1:42.20	$50,000	Listed	
1995	Mistress S.	José A. Santos	Mark A. Hennig	Edward P. Evans	1 1/16 miles	1:45.60	$50,000	Listed	On dirt
1994	Malli Star	José A. Santos	Ronald H. McKenzie	Five Star Stable	1 1/8 miles	1:47.24	$50,000	Listed	
1993	O. P. Cat	Eduardo O. Nunez	Oliver E. Edwards	Jacqueline & A.S. Roger	1 1/8 miles	1:51.00	$50,000	Listed	
1992	Chinese Empress	José A. Santos	H. Allen Jerkens	Georgia E. Hofmann	abt. 1 1/8 miles	1:50.00	$50,000	Listed	
1991	Kiwi Mint	Craig Perret	Flint S. Schulhofer		1 1/16 miles	1:45.20	$50,000	Listed	On dirt
1990	Virgin Michael	Jacinto Vásquez	H. Allen Jerkens	Middletown Stables	abt. 1 mile	1:37.80	$50,000		(Note: Held: 28 February 1990)
1989	Race not held								
1988	Race not held								
1987	Lady Vernalee	Julio Molina Pezua	J. Bert Sonnier	Ross Heritage Farm	7 furlongs	1:25.00	$20,000		On dirt (Note: Held: 4 April 1987)
1986	Natania	Herb McCauley	William Curtis Jr.	Dogwood Stable	1 1/16 miles	1:46.00	$26,050		On dirt (Note: Held: 20 February 1986)

Legend:
Turf Dirt

== See also ==
List of American and Canadian Graded races
