= Amethyst Stakes =

Flat horse race in Ireland

- Class: Listed
- Location: Leopardstown; County Dublin, Ireland
- Race type: Flat / Thoroughbred
- Website: Leopardstown

Race information
- Distance: 1 mile (1,609 metres)
- Surface: Turf
- Track: Left-handed
- Qualification: Three-years-old and up
- Weight: 8 st 13 lb (3yo); 9 st 11 lb (4yo+); Allowances; 3 lb for fillies and mares Penalties; 5 lb for G1 / G2 winners * 3 lb for G3 winners * * since 1 June last year
- Purse: €47,000 (2022); 1st: €29,500

Amethyst Stakes
2026
| Catalina Delcarpio | Tokenomics | Excellent Believe |

Previous years
2025
Chicago Critic | Kortez Bay | Mutasarref
2024
Bold Discovery | Real Appeal | Knight To King
2023
Power Under Me | You Send Me | Wexford Native
2022
Pretreville | Ivy League | Patrick Sarsfield
2021
Maker Of Kings | Erzindjan | Ace Aussie

2020-2011
2020
Sinawann | Confidence High | New World Tapestry
2019
Hazapour | Verbal Dexterity | Zihba
2018
Zihba | Pincheck | True Valour
2017
Custom Cut | Raymonda | Cougar Mountain
2016
Steip Amach | Cougar Mountain | In My Pocket
2015
Onenightidreamed | Sruthan | Fire Ship
2014
Mustajeeb | Brendan Brackan | One Spirit
2013
Duntle | Custom Cut | Sweet Lightning
2012
Famous Name | Sweet Lightning | Barack
2011
Famous Name | Across The Rhine | Fighting Brave

2010-2001
2010
Famous Name | King Jock | Rose Hip
2009
Summit Surge | Three Rocks | Beach Bunny
2008
Ferneley | Lord Admiral | Excelerate
2007
Danak | Lord Admiral | Decado
2006
Arch Rebel | Hard Rock City | Lord Admiral
2005
Tolpuddle | Solskjaer | Zarad
2004
D'Anjou | Meath | Tolpuddle
2003
European | Mr Houdini | Livadiya
2002
Bach | Provosky | Tarry Flynn
2001
King Of Tara | Tarry Flynn | Montecastillo

2000-1991
2000
Anzari | Jammaal | One Won One
1999
Burden Of Proof | Access All Areas | Granite
1998
Burden Of Proof | Chateau Royal | Lil's Boy
1997
Burden Of Proof | Wizard King | Theano
1996
Idris | Cadeaux Tryst | Troysend
1995
Akhiyar | Ivory Frontier | Free To Speak
1994
City Nights | Ivory Frontier | Guided Tour
1993
Unusual Heat | Malvernico | Shahik
1992
Brief Truce | Tijara | Riszard
1991
Thornberry | Star Of Gdansk | Prudent Manner

1990-1988
1990
Just Three | Elementary | Milieu
1989
Great Lakes | Vestris Abu | Secret Appeal
1988
Lord Bud | Clash Of Ideas | Savoureux

The Amethyst Stakes is a Listed Flat horse race in Ireland open to thoroughbreds aged three years or older. It is run over a distance of 1 mile (1,609 metres) at Leopardstown in May.

== History ==
The event was formerly staged at Phoenix Park. For a period it held Listed status. Known previously by sponsored titles, it was renamed the Amethyst Stakes in 1989 and transferred to Leopardstown in 1991.

The Amethyst Stakes was promoted to Group 3 level in 2007, where it remained until it was downgraded to listed status in 2025.

== Records ==
Most successful horse since 1986 (3 wins):

- Burden of Proof – 1997, 1998, 1999
- Famous Name – 2010, 2011, 2012

Leading jockey since 1986 (6 wins):

- Johnny Murtagh – Thornberry (1991), Akhiyar (1995), Burden of Proof (1997, 1998), Anzari (2000), Arch Rebel (2006)
- Michael Kinane – Brief Truce (1992), Unusual Heat (1993), City Nights (1994), Burden of Proof (1999), D'Anjou (2004), Danak (2007)

Leading trainer since 1986 (8 wins):

- Dermot Weld – Brief Truce (1992), Unusual Heat (1993), City Nights (1994), Famous Name (2010, 2011, 2012), Mustajeeb (2014), Hazapour (2019)

== Winners since 1986 ==
| Year | Winner | Age | Jockey | Trainer | Time |
|---|---|---|---|---|---|
| 1986 | Mr John | 3 | Martin Browne | Liam Browne | 1:50.20 |
| 1987 | Baba Karam | 3 | Cash Asmussen | Vincent O'Brien |
| 1988 | Lord Bud | 3 | Pat Gilson | Tony Redmond | 1:54.60 |
| 1989 | Great Lakes | 3 | John Reid | Vincent O'Brien | 1:41.50 |
| 1990 | Just Three | 4 | John Reid | Matt McCormack | 1:34.90 |
| 1991 | Thornberry | 3 | Johnny Murtagh | John Oxx | 1:40.40 |
| 1992 | Brief Truce | 3 | Michael Kinane | Dermot Weld | 1:43.50 |
| 1993 | Unusual Heat | 3 | Michael Kinane | Dermot Weld | 1:44.60 |
| 1994 | City Nights | 3 | Michael Kinane | Dermot Weld | 1:40.90 |
| 1995 | Akhiyar | 4 | Johnny Murtagh | John Oxx | 1:41.90 |
| 1996 | Idris | 6 | Kevin Manning | Jim Bolger | 1:39.90 |
| 1997 | Burden of Proof | 5 | Johnny Murtagh | Charles O'Brien | 1:47.60 |
| 1998 | Burden of Proof | 6 | Johnny Murtagh | Charles O'Brien | 1:40.20 |
| 1999 | Burden of Proof | 7 | Michael Kinane | Aidan O'Brien | 1:43.50 |
| 2000 | Anzari | 3 | Johnny Murtagh | John Oxx | 1:39.90 |
| 2001 | King of Tara | 3 | Seamie Heffernan | Aidan O'Brien | 1:42.10 |
| 2002 | Bach | 5 | Seamie Heffernan | Aidan O'Brien | 1:38.60 |
| 2003 | European | 3 | Pat Shanahan | Con Collins | 1:41.40 |
| 2004 | D'Anjou | 7 | Michael Kinane | John Oxx | 1:45.00 |
| 2005 | Tolpuddle | 5 | Wayne Lordan | Tommy Stack | 1:50.20 |
| 2006 | Arch Rebel | 5 | Johnny Murtagh | Noel Meade | 1:41.40 |
| 2007 | Danak | 4 | Michael Kinane | John Oxx | 1:38.80 |
| 2008 | Ferneley | 4 | Willie Supple | Francis Ennis | 1:40.50 |
| 2009 | Summit Surge | 5 | Keagan Latham | Ger Lyons | 1:40.35 |
| 2010 | Famous Name | 5 | Pat Smullen | Dermot Weld | 1:37.33 |
| 2011 | Famous Name | 6 | Pat Smullen | Dermot Weld | 1:38.92 |
| 2012 | Famous Name | 7 | Pat Smullen | Dermot Weld | 1:42.59 |
| 2013 | Duntle | 4 | Wayne Lordan | David Wachman | 1:42.50 |
| 2014 | Mustajeeb | 3 | Pat Smullen | Dermot Weld | 1:42.64 |
| 2015 | Onenightidreamed | 4 | Wayne Lordan | Tommy Stack | 1:52.07 |
| 2016 | Steip Amach | 4 | Kevin Manning | Jim Bolger | 1:40.32 |
| 2017 | Custom Cut | 8 | Daniel Tudhope | David O'Meara | 1:44.17 |
| 2018 | Zihba | 3 | Chris Hayes | Fozzy Stack | 1:42.18 |
| 2019 | Hazapour | 4 | Oisin Orr | Dermot Weld | 1:42.12 |
| 2020 | Sinawann (Note: The 2020 race was run in July due to the COVID-19 pandemic in the Republic of Ireland) | 3 | Ronan Whelan | Michael Halford | 1:41.54 |
| 2021 | Maker of Kings | 4 | Colin Keane | Ger Lyons | 1:41.95 |
| 2022 | Pretreville | 7 | Ronan Whelan | Adrian McGuinness | 1:41.82 |
| 2023 | Power Under Me | 5 | Colin Keane | Ger Lyons | 1:48.84 |
| 2024 | Bold Discovery | 4 | Shane Foley | Jessica Harrington | 1:41.46 |
| 2025 | Chicago Critic | 4 | Ben Coen | Johnny Murtagh | 1:41.00 |
| 2026 | Catalina Delcarpio | 4 | Billy Lee | Paddy Twomey | 1:40:17 |

== See also ==
- Horse racing in Ireland
- List of Irish flat horse races
