= Appalachian Stakes =

- Class: Grade III
- Location: Keeneland Racecourse; Lexington, Kentucky; United States
- Inaugurated: 1989
- Race type: Thoroughbred – Flat racing
- Sponsor: Japan Racing Association (since 2013)
- Website: Keeneland

Race information
- Distance: 1 mile
- Surface: Turf
- Track: Left-handed
- Qualification: Three-year-old fillies
- Weight: 123 lbs with allowances
- Purse: US$500,000 (2025)

The Appalachian Stakes is a Grade III American Thoroughbred horse race for three-year-old fillies over a distance of one mile (8 furlongs) on the turf held annually in early April at Keeneland Race Course, Lexington, Kentucky during the spring meeting. The event currently offers a purse of $500,000.

== History ==
The Appalachian Stakes was named for the Appalachian Mountains which extend into Eastern Kentucky.

The event was inaugurated on 7 April 1989 and was won by the Christiana Stables owned To the Lighthouse, in a time of 1:46 1/5 over the 1 1/16 miles distance. The event was run at this distance until 1995.

The event was upgraded to Grade III event in 2008 and in 2018 to Grade II.

== Records ==
Speed record

- 1:33.97 – Enola Gay (2020)

Margins

- 6 lengths – White Corners (1992)

Most wins by an owner

- 2 – Brereton C. Jones (1993, 2010)
- 2 – Team Valor (2002, 2007)
- 2 – D. J. Stable (2023, 2025)

Most wins by a jockey

- 4 – Pat Day (1991, 1993, 2000, 2002)

Most wins by a trainer

- 4 – Mark E. Casse (2016, 2017, 2023, 2025)

== Winners ==
Year	Winner	Jockey	Trainer	Owner	Distance	Time	Purse	Grade	Ref
2026	Storm's Wake	Joel Rosario	Brian A. Lynch	William K. Werner	1 mile	1:35.51	$490,625	II	
2025	Nitrogen	José Ortiz	Mark E. Casse	D. J. Stable	1 mile	1:37.00	$500,000	II	
2024	Buchu	Martin Garcia	Philip Bauer	Rigney Racing	1 mile	1:36.36	$386,888	II	
2023	Papilio (IRE)	Javier Castellano	Mark E. Casse	D.J. Stable, Medallion Racing, Barry Fowler & Parkland Thoroughbreds	1 mile	1:36.32	$338,600	II	
2022	Spendarella	Tyler Gaffalione	H. Graham Motion	Gainesway Stable	1 mile	1:37.41	$308,950	II	
2021	Jouster	Luis Saez	Todd A. Pletcher	Starlight Racing	1 mile	1:36.83	$200,000	II	
2020	Enola Gay	Julien Leparoux	Claude R. McGaughey III	Allen Stable Inc	1 mile	1:33.97	$150,000	II	
2019	The Mackem Bullet (IRE)	Tyler Gaffalione	Wesley A. Ward	Katsumi Yoshida	1 mile	1:39.31	$200,000	II	
2018	Rushing Fall	Javier Castellano	Chad C. Brown	E Five Racing Thoroughbreds	1 mile	1:38.66	$200,000	II	
2017	La Coronel	Florent Geroux	Mark E. Casse	John C. Oxley	1 mile	1:37.12	$125,000	III	
2016	Catch a Glimpse	Florent Geroux	Mark E. Casse	Gary Barber, Michael J. Ambler & Windways Farm	1 mile	1:37.27	$125,000	III	
2015	Lady Eli	Irad Ortiz Jr.	Chad C. Brown	Sheep Pond Partners	1 mile	1:35.80	$125,000	III	
2014	Daring Dancer	Alan Garcia	H. Graham Motion	Sagamore Farm	1 mile	1:36.04	$100,000	III	
2013	Unbelievable Dream	Joel Rosario	Barclay Tagg	Sure Thing Stables	1 mile	1:37.91	$100,000	III	
2012	Dayatthespa	Javier Castellano	Chad C. Brown	Jerry & Ronald Frankel, Steve Laymon & Bradley Thoroughbreds	1 mile	1:36.08	$100,000	III	
2011	Winter Memories	Jose Lezcano	James J. Toner	Phillips Racing Partnership	1 mile	1:37.27	$100,000	III	
2010	Check the Label	Julien R. Leparoux	H. Graham Motion	Brereton C. Jones	1 mile	1:34.87	$100,000	III	
2009	Afternoon Stroll	Jamie Theriot	Timothy E. Hamm	Blazing Meadows Farms & Rick Claypool	1 mile	1:36.67	$100,000	III	
2008	Alwajeeha	John R. Velazquez	Kiaran P. McLaughlin	Shadwell Stable	1 mile	1:37.37	$125,000	III	
2007	Audacious Chloe	John R. Velazquez	Todd A. Pletcher	Team Valor & Never Tell Racing	1 mile	1:36.39	$115,700	Listed	
2006	Lady of Venice (FR)	Julien R. Leparoux	Patrick L. Biancone	Martin S. Schwartz	1 mile	1:35.85	$109,100	Listed	
2005	Melhor Ainda	John R. Velazquez	Robert J. Frankel	TNT Stud	1 mile	1:37.69	$112,800	Listed	
2004	Lucifer's Stone	José A. Santos	Linda L. Rice	Team Solaris Stable	1 mile	1:37.58	$113,500	Listed	
2003	Ocean Drive	Jerry D. Bailey	Todd A. Pletcher	Sybon Stable	1 mile	1:36.13	$111,300	Listed	
2002	Stylelistick	Pat Day	William I. Mott	Team Valor & Dream With Me Stable	1 mile	1:36.62	$112,100	Listed	
2001	Bold Answer	Mark Guidry	Michael Stidham	Linda Neece	1 mile	1:35.22	$113,500	Listed	
2000	Impending Bear	Pat Day	Michael Stidham	Michael J. Ryan	1 mile	1:36.24	$113,300	Listed	
1999	Tres Coronas	Jorge F. Chavez	Stanley M. Hough	Bea & Robert H. Roberts	1 mile	1:35.26	$111,700	Listed	
1998	Halo River	Craig Perret	Anthony L. Reinstedler	Robert B. Berger	1 mile	1:34.80	$72,735	Listed	
1997	Witchful Thinking	Shane Sellers	Niall M. O'Callaghan	Peter Grimm	1 mile	1:35.19	$72,150	Listed	
1996	Dyna Whirl	Robbie Davis	Burk Kessinger Jr.	Nancy & Richard Kaster & Scott E. Ricker Kaster	1 mile	1:38.22	$71,240	Listed	
1995	Bail Out Becky	Shane Sellers	William I. Mott	Kenneth L. Ramsey	1 1/16 miles	1:41.60	$67,919	Listed	
1994	Bedroom Blues	Mike E. Smith	William A. Deakins	Alan Booge & Pauline Deakins	1 1/16 miles	1:45.00	$55,275	Listed	
1993	Harlan Honey	Pat Day	Philip M. Hauswald	Brereton C. Jones	1 1/16 miles	1:45.20	$58,800	Listed	
1992	White Corners	Craig Perret	Jimmy Croll	Robert P. Levy	1 1/16 miles	1:44.40	$60,400	Listed	
1991	Radiant Ring (CAN)	Pat Day	James E. Day	Sam-Son Farm	1 1/16 miles	1:43.60	$56,525	Listed	
1990	Super Fan	José A. Santos	Steven C. Penrod	Hermitage Farm	1 1/16 miles	1:44.00	$55,775		
1989	To the Lighthouse	Randy Romero	William Badgett Jr.	Christiana Stables	1 1/16 miles	1:46.20	$56,100		

== See also ==
- List of American and Canadian Graded races
