= Idalia Ramos Rangel =

Mexican drug lord

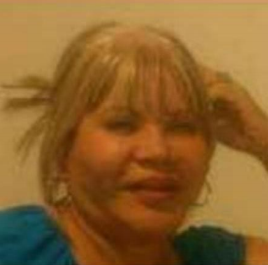
- Picture taken circa 2013
- Born: Idalia Ramos Rangel; 20 May 1955 (age 70); Matamoros, Tamaulipas, Mexico
- Other names: Big Momma; La Tía
- Occupation: Business owner
- Employer: Gulf Cartel (suspected)
- Criminal charge: Drug trafficking
- Criminal status: Fugitive

Notes
- Wanted by the Federal Bureau of Investigation (FBI) with a US$25,000 bounty

Idalia Ramos Rangel (born 20 May 1955) is a Mexican business owner and suspected drug lord. According to the U.S. Federal Bureau of Investigation (FBI), she is a high-ranking member of the Gulf Cartel, a criminal group based in Tamaulipas, Mexico. In the cartel, Ramos Rangel is known by her aliases Big Momma and La Tía (The Aunt). She has reportedly been responsible for coordinating international drug trafficking shipments from Mexico to the United States since the mid-1980s. Her role in organized crime is unusual, as a woman active in the male-dominated Mexican drug trafficking industry over several decades.

Ramos Rangel is wanted in the U.S. states of Texas and Arkansas for her alleged involvement in drug trafficking. According to multiple federal indictments, Ramos Rangel has employed family members to distribute cocaine in the United States on her behalf. She has also employed inmates from U.S. federal facilities to help her distribute drugs after their release from prison. Investigators believe she is hiding in Matamoros, her hometown and center of operations. The FBI is offering a US$25,000 bounty to anyone providing information that leads to her arrest and conviction.

== Early life and career ==
Idalia Ramos Rangel was born in Matamoros, Tamaulipas, Mexico, on 20 May 1955. She has naturally black hair and brown eyes and is of Hispanic descent. According to the Federal Bureau of Investigation (FBI), Ramos Rangel has been responsible for coordinating international drug trafficking activities from Mexico to the United States since the mid-1980s. She is reportedly a high-ranking member of the Tamaulipas-based Gulf Cartel. She is a particularly unusual figure in organized crime circles, given her involvement over several decades in the male-dominated Mexican drug trafficking industry.

In her FBI profile, Ramos Rangel is described as being between 5 ft 2 in (1.57 m) and 5 ft 3 in (1.60 m) tall, and weighing between 130 lb (59 kg) and 150 lb (68 kg). Ramos Rangel has altered her physical appearance multiple times, by dyeing her hair blonde and through plastic surgery. The FBI suspects that her file pictures may be outdated, and that her appearance may have changed again. Among other personal details in her FBI profile, she is described as having been a business owner running multiple businesses in Mexico, including a sports bar in Matamoros. Investigators have stated that Ramos Rangel is a regular Facebook user, and that she travels to Monterrey, Nuevo León for pleasure. She is a breast cancer survivor.

Ramos Rangel uses multiple identities and aliases, including Big Momma, La Tía (The Aunt), Soria Cano, Idalia Ramos Martinez, Idalia Martinez, Idalia Gonzales Perez, Idalia Ramos, Idelia Ramos Rangel, Idalia Rangel, and Idelia Ramos Ramos. Her current whereabouts are unknown, but investigators believe she may be hiding in Matamoros, her center of operations. The FBI is offering a $25,000 bounty for information leading to her arrest and conviction. She faces federal drug charges in the states of Texas and Arkansas, and has been a fugitive of United States justice since the 1980s.

In the late 1990s, U.S. authorities searched a home in Brownsville, Texas during an anti-marijuana operation. The agents were investigating a Mexican drug trafficking ring smuggling marijuana through Mexico, South Texas, Houston, and other parts of the United States. Ramos Rangel was discovered living at the house. US$15,000 in cash was found in a trash can, with a list of apparent drug transactions. When questioned, Ramos Rangel refused to cooperate. She was arrested, not on drug charges but because she was in the country illegally. She had already served a prison sentence in the United States for a previous drug offense, and had been deported and ordered never to return to the country. Ramos Rangel was a low-level criminal during that time. In subsequent years, she rose through the leadership ranks of the Gulf Cartel.

United States officials have issued extradition requests to the Mexican government since her ascent, but acknowledge the legal difficulties of the process. The FBI-led case against Ramos Rangel began in 2010. With the joint participation of the U.S. Immigration and Customs Enforcement (ICE), the FBI's case has yielded arrests in Arkansas, Brownsville and Austin. The operation was code-named Operation Dirty Bird.

== Indictments and network ==
In April 2011, the Cameron County Sheriff's Office in Brownsville seized 30 kg (66 lb) of cocaine heading to Chicago, Illinois. According to several witnesses who testified to law enforcement, the cocaine shipment was owned by Ramos Rangel. A Brownsville drug trafficker, Julio Cesar Cardenas, was involved in the scheme, helping a co-conspirator to move Ramos Rangel's drug load. Cardenas assisted by storing 3 kg (6.6 lb) of the cocaine. After police seized the drugs, Cardenas advised the co-conspirator on how to deal with Ramos Rangel, recommending the use of violence, specifically kidnappings and bombs, to settle disputes with her gangsters.

On 2 May 2013, Ramos Rangel was indicted by a federal grand jury in the United States District Court for the Eastern District of Arkansas for several drug trafficking offenses, including possession of narcotics with intent to distribute them; cocaine trafficking; and using a telephone to coordinate drug trafficking activities. A federal warrant for her arrest was issued that day in Arkansas. The indictment was unsealed in court on 14 May. Under a superseding indictment charging other criminals associated with her, another federal arrest warrant was issued for Ramos Rangel in Arkansas on 6 June 2013 following the arrest of several of her alleged associates. The indictments stated that, on or around June 2008, Ramos Rangel and 15 of her associates (updated to 17 by a superseding indictment on 2 April 2014) knowingly possessed, with intent to distribute, at least 5 kg (11 lb) of cocaine. Ramos Rangel's network was accused of distributing over 100 kg (220 lb) of cocaine in Arkansas. Ramos Rangel was identified as the lead conspirator and was accused of employing her children and other relatives to facilitate the drug scheme.

Ramos Rangel reportedly coordinated with her son, Mohammed Kazam Martinez ("Mo"), who was imprisoned at the Federal Correctional Institution in Forrest City, Arkansas, to recruit inmates to assist in distributing cocaine for her network upon their release from prison. When Ramos Rangel's network used this hiring method it was a relatively new tactic for Mexican drug cartels. Inmates close to finishing their sentences are employed in order to work for the cartel on their release. These inmates are not directly part of the cartel's hierarchy, and are generally regarded as "work-for-hire" members. Among those inmates were Emmanuel Ilo ("Chi") and Mervin Johnson ("Slim"), who distributed cocaine for her in central Arkansas after they were released. Ramos Rangel's son used the prison's telephone system and emails to communicate with other members of her network. In one recorded telephone conversation with Johnson, quoted in Ramos Rangel's indictment, Martinez mentions his mother's role in the conspiracy while discussing a drug debt, saying: "You owe Big Momma some money. If you keep f***ing up, they gonna cut everybody off. You are gonna f**k [Ilo] and me up because of you."

Other members of Ramos Rangel's network included her son Homar Martinez, Manuel Garza ("Manny"), Jaime Benavides, her daughter Nishme Martinez ("La Gorda"), Denice Duran Martinez, Yadira Anahy Martinez, Leobarda Jaime Ugalde ("Leo") and Juan Alonso Morales. They helped Ramos Rangel by securing cocaine deliveries from Mexico and Texas to Little Rock, collecting cash proceeds, creating bank accounts and depositing/withdrawing money, liaising with other drug dealers in Mexico and the United States, and smuggling cash earnings back into Mexico. Ramos Rangel used local redistributors, who sold the cocaine in Arkansas. Through Ilo, her network worked with local dealers, including Dwatney Noid, Dwight McLittle ("D.A."), Lamont Williams ("Peter Rabbit"), Gerard Trice ("Fly"), Tarvars Honorable ("Pudgy"), and Shanieka Tatum, who distributed directly to buyers. All of Ramos Rangel's associates deliberately concealed the nature of their activities, and used coded language and countersurveillance to avoid law enforcement detection.

Authorities described the case against Ramos Rangel as atypical, as it involved an international criminal group, coordination among federal inmates, and the supply of a large quantity of cocaine to Arkansas. The value of the cocaine trafficked to Arkansas by Ramos Rangel's network is estimated at US$10 million. If Ramos Rangel is found guilty of the conspiracy charge, she faces a mandatory minimum 10-year sentence, up to life imprisonment, with up to US$10 million in fines, and five years of mandatory supervised release. If found guilty of possession with intent to distribute less than 500 g (18 oz) of cocaine, the maximum sentence would be 20 years, a US$1 million fine, and three years of supervised release. The charge of using a communication device to facilitate drug trafficking activities carries a maximum four-year sentence, US$250,000 in fines, and up to a year of supervised release. She is considered innocent until proven guilty of the drug offenses through due process.

== See also ==
- Mexican drug war

== Bibliography ==
- McCormack, James W. (2013). United States of America v. Idalia Ramos-Rangel (PDF). United States District Court for the Eastern District of Arkansas. Archived (PDF) from the original on 2 March 2017.
- McCormack, James W. (2014). United States of America v. Idalia Ramos Rangel (2nd superseding indictment). United States District Court for the Eastern District of Arkansas.
