= Platinum Stakes =

Flat horse race in Ireland

Platinum Stakes
2026
Suzie Songs	Spinning Around	L L Koulsty

Previous years
2025
Super Sox	Gutsy Girl	Murkala
2024
Super Sox	Dance Night Andday	Mammas Girl
2023
Clever And Cool	Tarawa	Cosmic Vega
2022
Mutasarref	Cigamia	San Andreas
2021
Snapraeterea	Surrounding	Erzindjan

2020-2011
2020
Current Option	Soul Search	Southern Horse
2019
Flight Risk	Black Magic Woman	Chocolate Music
2018
Making Light	Pincheck	Panstarr
2017
Sir John Lavery	Rose De Pierre	Pavlenko
2016
Rose De Pierre	Flight Risk	Brendan Brackan
2015
Eshera	Wychwood Warrior	Steip Amach
2014
Brendan Brackan	Witches Brew	Akira
2013
Royal Blue Star	Akira	Beyond Thankful
2012
Akeed Mofeed	Barack	Croi An Or
2011
Alanza	Wild Wind	Hujaylea

2010-2001
2010
Hen Night	Maybe Grace	Famous
2009
Latin Love	Oh Goodness Me	Georgebernardshaw
2008
Duff	Mr Medici	Jalmira
2007
Jumbajukiba	She's Our Mark	Duff
2006
Danak	Arabian Prince	Duff
2005
Luas Line	Fairy Of The Night	Sanserif
2004
Caradak	One More Round	Shersha
2003
Dossier	Twiggy's Sister	Hymn Of Love
2002
Miss Honorine	One Won One	Phariseek
2001
Caumshinaun	Avorado	Montecastillo

2000-1997
2000
Good Heavens	Islandagore	Reve Russe
1999
Dazzling Park	Palace Royale	Takariya
1998
Approvance	Keriyoun	Lil's Boy
1997
Tout A Coup	Kilbride Lad	On Fair Stage

The Platinum Stakes is a Listed flat horse race in Ireland open to thoroughbreds aged three years or older. It is run at Cork over a distance of 1 mile (1,609 metres), and it is scheduled to take place each year in August.

== Records ==
Most successful horse:

- Super Sox - 2024, 2025

Leading jockey (3 wins):

- Michael Kinane – Shakespeare (2000), Caradak (2004), Danak (2006)
- Niall McCullagh – Tout A Coup (1997), Alanza (2011), Akeed Mofeed (2012)
- Pat Smullen – Caumshinaun (2001), Eshera (2015), Rose De Pierre (2016)
- Colin Keane - Brendan Brackan (2014), Mutasarref (2022), Suzie Songs (2026)

Leading trainer (6 wins):

- John Oxx – Miss Honorine (2002), Dossier (2003), Caradak (2004), Danak (2006), Alanza (2011), Akeed Mofeed (2012)

== Winners ==
Year	Winner	Age	Jockey	Trainer	Time
1997	Tout A Coup	4	Nialll McCullagh	G A Cusack	2:3.00
1998	Approvance	6	Pat Shanahan	James J Lenehan	1:49.10
1999	Dazzling Park	3	Kevin Manning	Jim Bolger	1:58.10
2000	Shakespeare^{[1]}	3	Michael Kinane	Aidan O'Brien	1:55.80
2001	Caumshinaun	4	Pat Smullen	Dermot Weld	1:35.40
2002	Miss Honorine	3	Fran Berry	John Oxx	1:38.70
2003	Dossier	3	Johnny Murtagh	John Oxx	1:37.70
2004	Caradak	3	Michael Kinane	John Oxx	1:36.80
2005	Luas Line	3	Kieren Fallon	David Wachman	1:38.20
2006	Danak	3	Michael Kinane	John Oxx	1:37.70
2007	Jumbajukiba	4	Davy Condon	Jessica Harrington	1:40.28
2008	Duff	5	Fran Berry	Edward Lynam	1:39.01
2009	Latin Love	3	Wayne Lordan	David Wachman	1:43.34
2010	Hen Night	3	Wayne Lordan	David Wachman	1:38.98
2011	Alanza	3	Niall McCullagh	John Oxx	1:38.06
2012	Akeed Mofeed	3	Niall McCullagh	John Oxx	1:44.20
2013	Royal Blue Star	5	Connor King	Jessica Harrington	1:40.20
2014	Brendan Brackan	5	Colin Keane	Ger Lyons	1:45.72
2015	Eshera	3	Pat Smullen	Dermot Weld	1:38.42
2016	Rose De Pierre	3	Pat Smullen	Dermot Weld	1:40.24
2017	Sir John Lavery	3	Seamie Heffernan	Aidan O'Brien	1:41.96
2018	Making Light	4	Declan McDonogh	Dermot Weld	1:39.18
2019	Flight Risk	8	Kevin Manning	Jim Bolger	1:23.12
2020	Current Option	4	Gavin Ryan	Adrian McGuinness	1:23.73
2020	Snapraeterea	3	Declan McDonogh	Joseph O'Brien	1:25.58
2022	Mutasarref	4	Colin Keane	Ger Lyons	1:23.59
2023	Clever And Cool	3	Rory Cleary	Jim Bolger	1:33.24
2024	Super Sox	3	Billy Lee	Paddy Twomey	1:21.53
2025	Super Sox	4	Chris Hayes	Paddy Twomey	1:24.60
2026	Suzie Songs	3	Colin Keane	Ger Lyons	1:23.98

^{1} The 2000 winner Shakespeare was later exported to Hong Kong and renamed Good Heavens.

== See also ==
- Horse racing in Ireland
- List of Irish flat horse races
