= Gainesway Farm =

American horse breeding business

Coordinates: 38.107°N 84.388°W

Gainesway Farm is an American Thoroughbred horse breeding business in Lexington, Kentucky. It was originally called Greentree Farms.

The 1,500-acre (6 km^{2}) property has been home to stallions such as Youth and Exceller and numerous others who are buried on the property. Among the current stallion roster is Tapit, sire of four Breeders' Cup winners since 2008 and 2013 Leading U.S.-based Yearling Sire.

In 1995, under the name Gainesway Stable, owner Graham J. Beck partnered with Robert and Beverly Lewis and William T. Young of Overbrook Farm in the ownership and racing of Timber Country who won the 1994 Breeders' Cup Juvenile and 1995 Preakness Stakes.

== Stallions ==
Gainesway is home to the following stallions:

2021 Roster
Stallion	Birth Year	Pedigree
Afleet Alex	2002	Northern Afleet x Maggy Hawk (Hawkster)
Anchor Down	2011	Tapit x Successful Outlook (Orientate)
Karakontie (JPN)	2011	Bernstein x Sun Is Up (Sunday Silence)
McKinzie	2015	Street Sense x Runaway Model (Petionville)
Spun to Run	2016	Hard Spun x Yawkey Way (Grand Slam)
Tapit	2001	Pulpit x Tap Your Heels (Unbridled)
Tapwrit	2014	Tapit x Appealing Zophie (Successful Appeal)

=== Historic stallions ===
- Vaguely Noble (1965–1989)
- Blushing Groom (1974–1992)
- Cannonade (1971–1993)
- Riverman (1969–1999)
- Irish River (1976–2004)
- Lyphard (1969–2005)
- Cozzene (1980–2008)
- Broad Brush (1983–2009)
- Mt. Livermore (1981–2010)
- Mr. Greeley (1992–2010)
- Hat Trick (Jpn 2012–2017)

== History ==
The Farm was formed by John R. Gaines, considered the founder of the Breeders Cup. Originally located off Tates Creek Pike in Lexington, this property was sold for development, and the thoroughbred division of Gainesway Farm, under the ownership of John R. Gaines, was moved to the present location on Paris Pike in Lexington.

In 1989, Gainesway Farm was sold to South African horseman Graham J. Beck, whose acquisition included what was once the C.V. Whitney farm properties established in 1915 by Harry Payne Whitney, plus the parcel belonging to Payne Whitney's Greentree Stud.

== Notable managers ==
One of the managers of Gainesway Farm was Joseph Lannon Taylor. He began his career in the horse industry as the farm manager at Gainesway Farm, where he raised many world-class standardbreds and thoroughbreds and was influential in developing Gainesway Farm. During his time there, Taylor saw six Gainesway stallions lead the world's sire list, the American sire list, or the European sire list: Bold Bidder, Vaguely Noble, Lyphard, Blushing Groom, Riverman, and Sharpen Up. After managing at Gainesway for 40 years, he retired in 1990.

== Burial site ==
The C.V. Whitney Farm, which is now part of Gainesway, is the final resting place of several champion thoroughbreds. Some of the Whitney/Gainesway horses buried here include:

- Arts and Letters (1966–1998)
- Bimelech (1937–1966)
- Blushing Groom (1974–1992)
- Bold Bidder (1962–1982)
- Broomstick (1901–1931)
- Cannonade (1971–1993)
- Capot (1946–1974)
- Counterpoint (1948–1969)
- Equipoise (1928–1938)
- Irish River (1976–2004)
- Key to the Mint (1969–1996)
- La Troienne (1926–1954)
- Lyphard (1969–2005)
- Mahmoud (1933–1962)
- Peter Pan (1904–1933)
- Regret (1912–1934)
- Riverman (1969–1999)
- Shut Out (1939–1964)
- Silver Spoon (1956–1978)
- St Germans (1921–1947)
- Stage Door Johnny (1965–1996)
- Tom Fool (1949–1976)
- Top Flight (1929–1949)
- Twenty Grand (1928–1948)
- Vaguely Noble (1965–1989)
- Whisk Broom II (1907–1928)
- Winning Colors (1985–2008)

== Arboretum ==
Gainesway Farm has also been designated as a Level II arboretum by ArbNet. The farm has over 1,500 acres (6 km^{2}) of decorative plants, floral displays, and tree collections that are nurtured by a full-time horticulture staff. Of particular note are the more than 45 different kinds of oaks, including a California Valley Oak and an Oglethorpe, that have been planted.
