= Myboycharlie =

Irish Thoroughbred racehorse

- Sire: Danetime
- Grandsire: Danehill
- Dam: Dulceata
- Damsire: Rousillon
- Sex: Stallion
- Foaled: 20 April 2005
- Country: Ireland
- Colour: Bay
- Breeder: Denis Noonan
- Owner: Türkiye Jokey kulübü
- Trainer: Tommy Stack; Cody Autrey
- Record: 9: 4-0-1
- Earnings: £195,429

Major wins
- Anglesey Stakes (2007); Prix Morny (2007)

Myboycharlie (foaled 20 April 2005) is an Irish-bred Thoroughbred racehorse and sire. He was one of the best two-year-olds of his generation in Europe when he won his first three races including the Anglesey Stakes and the Prix Morny. He did not live up to his early promise and failed to win again before being retired from racing at the end of the following year. He stood as a breeding stallion in Australia, England, France and Turkey and has had considerable success as a sire of winners.

== Background ==
Myboycharlie is a bay horse with no white markings bred in Ireland by Denis Noonan of the County Cork-based Cregg Stud. In November 2005 the foal was consigned to the Goffs sale and was bought for €13,000 by the Tally-Ho Stud. Ten months later he returned to the sales ring at Doncaster and was sold for 56,000 guineas to the trainer Tommy Stack. The colt entered the ownership of the Hammersboy – I.R.S.com Syndicate and was taken into training with Stack at Golden, County Tipperary.

He was sired by Danetime, a sprinter who recorded his biggest win when taking the Stewards' Cup as a three-year-old in 1997. As a breeding stallion he sired several other good winners including Bushranger, Utmost Respect (Duke of York Stakes), Baltic King (Wokingham Stakes), Vital Equine (Champagne Stakes) and Look Busy (Temple Stakes). Myboycharlie's dam Dulceata who showed no racing ability, finishing unplaced on her only start. She was a granddaughter of the British broodmare Cake, making her a close relative of Tarascon.

== Racing career ==
=== 2007: two-year-old season ===
Myboycharlie made his racecourse debut in a maiden race over six furlongs on soft ground at the Curragh on 30 June. Ridden by Wayne Lordan he started at odds of 7/2 and took the lead inside the final furlong before drawing away to win "easily" by three lengths. On 15 July, with Lordan again in the saddle, the colt was stepped up in class and distance for the Group 3 Anglesey Stakes over six and a half furlongs on heavy ground at the same track and started the 2/1 second favourite behind the Aidan O'Brien-trained South Dakota. After being restrained in the early stages he went to the front approaching the final furlong and accelerated away from his opponents to win in "impressive" style by seven lengths from the filly Tuscan Evening. After the race he was acquired privately by the Coolmore Stud and thereafter raced in the ownership of Susan Magnier, Michael Tabor and Derrick Smith.

On 19 August Myboycharlie was sent to France and moved up to Group 1 class for the Prix Morny over 1200 metres on soft ground at Deauville Racecourse in which he was ridden by Kieren Fallon. He was made the 1.5/1 favourite, with the best of his five opponents appearing to be the filly Natagora and the Prix de Cabourg winner Alexandros. He raced towards the rear as Natagora made the running before overtaking the filly 300 metres from the finish and winning by two lengths. Fallon commented "He's a decent type of horse, a top-of-the-ground horse, and I wouldn't mind him getting better ground. The filly was the one I had to beat and I didn't want her to get a few lengths up on me." After the race he was made joint-favourite in the ante-post betting for the following year's 2000 Guineas by William Hill.

Fallon was again in the saddle when Myboycharlie started 5/2 second favourite for a strongly contested edition of the National Stakes over seven furlongs at the Curragh on 16 September. After settling in sixth place he stayed on in the closing stages without ever looking likely to win and sustained his first defeat as he came home third behind New Approach and Rio de la Plata.

At the end of his 2007 season Myboycharlie was rated the third-best two-year-old in Europe behind New Approach and Fast Company.

=== 2008: three-year-old season ===
In 2008 Myboycharlie was initially campaigned over sprint distances in Europe. On 24 May he started 11/8 favourite for the Group 3 Greenlands Stakes over six furlongs at the Curragh but after leading for most of the way he was overtaken in the last quarter mile and finished fifth of the eight runners behind the four-year-old Astronomer Royal. In the following month he was dropped back to five furlongs for the Sapphire Stakes at the same track but despite being made joint-favourite he made little impression and came home fifth behind the British challenger Tax Free, beaten more than five lengths by the winner.

In the autumn of 2008 Myboycharlie was sent to race in the United States where he was trained by Cody Autrey. He began his North American campaign by finishing last when favourite for the Don Ciccio Stakes over five and a half furlongs at Hawthorne Race Course on 13 October. At Fair Grounds Race Course on 12 December he was partnered by Jamie Theriot in an allowance race over one mile and led from the start to win by one and a quarter lengths from Can't Beat It and eight others. Fifteen days later at the same track the colt ended his track career by running fourth to Jimmy Sims in the Woodchopper Stakes.

== Stud record ==
Myboycharlie began his stud career at the Vinery Stud in Australia in 2009 before returning to England in the following year to stand at the National Stud. He moved to the Haras du Mezeray in Normandy two years later where he remained until 2019 when he was bought by the Turkish Jockey Club and exported to Turkey. Despite his stud fee never rising above €7,500 in Europe he has sired several top-class performers and has been particularly successful as a sire of fillies and mares.

=== Major winners ===
c = colt, f = filly, g = gelding

Foaled	Name	Sex	Major Wins
2011	Euro Charline	f	Beverly D. Stakes
2011	Peggy Jean	f	Sires' Produce Stakes (ATC)
2012	Jameka	f	VRC Oaks, Caulfield Cup, Tancred Stakes
2014	Begood Toya Mother	g	Sir Rupert Clarke Stakes
2014	Sistercharlie	f	Jenny Wiley Stakes, Diana Stakes, Beverly D. Stakes, Breeders' Cup Filly & Mare Turf, Flower Bowl Stakes

== Pedigree ==
Pedigree of Myboycharlie (IRE), bay stallion, 2005
Sire Danetime (IRE) 1994	Danehill (USA); 1986	Danzig	Northern Dancer (CAN)
Sire Danetime (IRE) 1994	Danehill (USA); 1986	Danzig	Pas de Nom
Sire Danetime (IRE) 1994	Danehill (USA); 1986	Razyana	His Majesty
Sire Danetime (IRE) 1994	Danehill (USA); 1986	Razyana	Spring Adieu (CAN)
Sire Danetime (IRE) 1994	Allegheny River (USA); 1987	Lear Fan	Roberto
Sire Danetime (IRE) 1994	Allegheny River (USA); 1987	Lear Fan	Wac
Sire Danetime (IRE) 1994	Allegheny River (USA); 1987	Allesheny	Be My Guest
Sire Danetime (IRE) 1994	Allegheny River (USA); 1987	Allesheny	Bold Sands
Dam Dulceata (IRE) 1988	Rousillon (USA); 1981	Riverman	Never Bend
Dam Dulceata (IRE) 1988	Rousillon (USA); 1981	Riverman	River Lady
Dam Dulceata (IRE) 1988	Rousillon (USA); 1981	Belle Dorine	Marshua's Dancer
Dam Dulceata (IRE) 1988	Rousillon (USA); 1981	Belle Dorine	Palsy Walsy
Dam Dulceata (IRE) 1988	Snowtop (IRE); 1983	Thatching	Thatch (IRE)
Dam Dulceata (IRE) 1988	Snowtop (IRE); 1983	Thatching	Abella (GB)
Dam Dulceata (IRE) 1988	Snowtop (IRE); 1983	Icing	Prince Tenderfoot (USA)
Dam Dulceata (IRE) 1988	Snowtop (IRE); 1983	Icing	Cake (GB) (Family 13-e)
