= Sistercharlie =

Irish-bred Thoroughbred racehorse

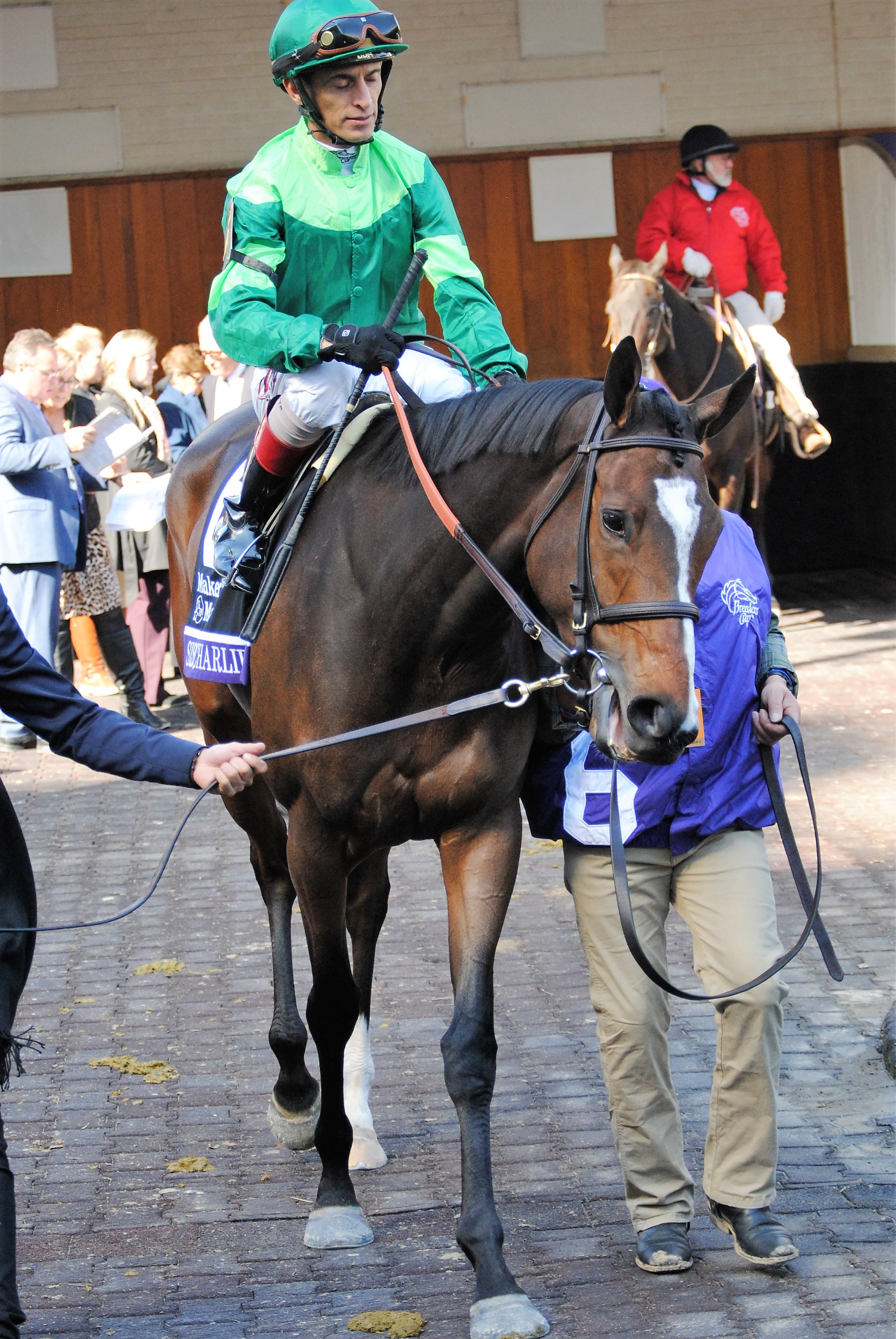
- Sistercharlie at the 2018 Breeders' Cup
- Sire: Myboycharlie
- Grandsire: Danetime
- Dam: Starlet's Sister
- Damsire: Galileo
- Sex: Filly
- Foaled: 13 March 2014
- Country: Ireland
- Colour: Bay
- Breeder: Ecurie des Monceaux
- Owner: White Birch Farm & Mme J Cygler; Peter M. Brant
- Trainer: Henri-Alex Pantall; Chad C. Brown
- Record: 13: 9-3-0
- Earnings: US$3,207,003 £1,930,296

Major wins
- Prix Durban (2017); Prix Penelope (2017); Jenny Wiley Stakes (2018); Diana Stakes (2018, 2019); Beverly D. Stakes (2018, 2019); Breeders' Cup Filly & Mare Turf (2018)

Awards
- American Champion Turf Female (2018)

Sistercharlie (foaled 13 March 2014) is a champion Irish-bred Thoroughbred racehorse who won the 2018 Breeders' Cup Filly & Mare Turf and was the 2018 Champion Female Turf Horse. She also won the Prix Penelope, Jenny Wiley Stakes, Diana Stakes twice, and Beverly D. Stakes twice.

== Background ==
Sistercharlie is a bay mare with a white blaze and a long white sock on her left hind leg bred in Ireland by the French-based Ecurie des Monceaux. In October the yearling filly was put up for auction in the Aqrana sale at Deauville and was bought for €12,000 by the bloodstock agency NATAF Paul. She subsequently entered the ownership of White Birch Farm & Mme J Cygler and was sent into training in France with Henri-Alex Pantall.

She was sired by Myboycharlie who won the Anglesey Stakes and the Prix Morny as a two-year-old in 2007. His other foal have included the Group 1 winning mares Euro Charline (Beverly D. Stakes) and Jameka (Caulfield Cup). Her dam, Starlet's Sister, showed little racing ability, failing to win in three starts in France, but went on to a top record as a broodmare, producing Prix de l'Arc de Triomphe winner Sottsass, Breeders' Cup Filly & Mare Turf runner-up My Sister Nat and Japan Cup runner-up Shin Emperor. Starlet's Sister was a great-granddaughter of Alea who produced Noalcoholic and was the female-line ancestor of the Preakness Stakes winner Red Bullet.

== Racing career ==
=== 2016: two-year-old season ===
Sistercharlie began her racing career in a maiden race over 1900 metres on the polytrack surface on 17 December in which he started at odds of 5.1/1 in a twelve-runner field. Ridden by Pierre-Charles Boudot she won by a short head from Tres Belle, with the pair finishing four lengths clear of the rest.

=== 2017: three-year-old season ===
On her three-year-old debut Sistercharlie finished fourth behind Music Lover over 2000 metres on heavy turf in the Listed Prix de Rose de Mai at Saint-Cloud Racecourse on 11 March. On 2 April, over 2100 metres on better ground at the same track she started at odds of 5/1 for the Listed Prix Durban in which she was ridden by Maxime Guyon and won by three quarters of a length from Palombe. Three weeks later, over the same course and distance, the filly was stepped up in class for the Group 3 Prix Penelope. With Guyon again the saddle she was made the 4.5/1 third choice in the betting behind Rhythmique and Palombe in a seven-runner field which also included Music Lover. After being retrained towards the rear she produced a sustained run in the straight, took the lead 70 metres from the finish and won by a length from the Freddy Head-trained Listen In.

On 18 June at Chantilly Racecourse Sistercharlie was stepped up to Group 1 class for the Prix de Diane over 2100 metres and started at odds of 12.1/1 in a sixteen-runner field. Ridden by Boudot she was repeatedly blocked as she attempted to make progress in the straight but finished strongly to take second place, a length behind the winner Senga. Shortly after the race Sistercharlie was bought privately by Peter Brant and transferred to the stable of Chad Brown in the United States. On her debut for her new connections she ran in the Belmont Oaks a Grade I race over ten furlongs at Belmont Park in July. Ridden by John Velasquez she started the 7/4 favourite but was beaten a neck into second by the Breeders' Cup Juvenile Fillies Turf winner New Money Honey.

After her run at Belmont the filly picked up a serious lung infection which kept her of the track for the rest of the year.

=== 2018: four-year-old season ===
Sistercharlie was ridden by Velasquez in all of her 2018 races. She began her third campaign in the Grade I Jenny Wiley Stakes over 8 1/2 furlongs at Keeneland Racecourse on 14 April and was made the 3.4/1 second choice in the betting behind the Argentinian mare Donna Bruja. The other nine runners included Off Limits (Matriarch Stakes), La Coronel (Queen Elizabeth II Challenge Cup Stakes) and Cambodia (Yellow Ribbon Handicap). After racing in mid-division, Sistercharlie took the lead a furlong out and drew away to win by two and a quarter lengths from her six-year-old stablemate Fourstar Crook. Velasquez said "She sat really well. By the three-eighths pole, I knew I was in a good position—just looking for where I was going to shoot through. I got through ... and had the best horse".

At Belmont Park on 8 June Sistercharlie started odds-on favourite for the New York Stakes but was beaten a head by Fourstar Crook, to whom she was conceding two pounds in weight. The Diana Stakes over nine furlongs at Saratoga Race Course on 21 July start favourite ahead of six opponents including New Money Honey, A Raving Beauty (Just A Game Stakes), Proctor's Ledge (Churchill Distaff Turf Mile Stakes). Sistercharlie raced in fifth place before making a strong late challenge on the outside and took the lead in the final stride to win by a nose from the outsider Ultra Brat. Chad Brown commented "This isn't her ideal distance, nor was the mile and a sixteenth in the Jenny Wiley. But just with sheer class, heart, and ability, she can do it".

On 11 August, in the Beverly D Stakes over 9 1/2 furlongs at Arlington Park, the filly started 1.6/1 favourite ahead of eight opponents including Fourstar Crook, Donna Bruja, Daddys Lil Darling (American Oaks) and the Irish filly Athena (Belmont Oaks). Sistercharlie was restrained towards the rear before producing her customary late run on the outside, taking the lead inside the final furlong and winning by half a length from Fourstar Crook. After the race Velasquez said "She's a really good horse, but she has some quirks. She can run, though" while Brow commented "She's the type of mare any trainer would love to have".

On 3 November Sistercharlie contested the 20th running of the Breeders' Cup Filly & Mare Turf over eleven furlongs at Churchill Downs and started at odds of 5/1 in a fourteen-runner field. The British-trained Wild Illusion started favourite while the other European challengers were Princess Yaiza (Prix de Royallieu) Athena, Magic Wand (Ribblesdale Stakes) and Eziyra (Blandford Stakes). The only other American contenders seriously considered in the betting were Fourstar Crook and A Raving Beauty. After racing in mid-division as A Raving Beauty set the pace, Sistercharlie moved upon the outside approaching the final turn before launching her challenge in the straight. She overtook Wild Illusion and A Raving Beauty in the last hundred yards to win by a neck and three quarters of a length. After the race Brown said "She's all class, this horse, and she knows where the wire is. She showed her heart there in the last stages". Peter Brant said "This mare has had so much bad luck and she's overcome it... she's just overcome everything and she's very special, very special to me and very special to my family and I'm sure very special to Chad".

== Pedigree ==
Pedigree of Sistercharlie (IRE), bay filly, 2014
Sire Myboycharlie (IRE) 2005	Danetime; 1994	Danehill (USA)	Danzig
Sire Myboycharlie (IRE) 2005	Danetime; 1994	Danehill (USA)	Razyana
Sire Myboycharlie (IRE) 2005	Danetime; 1994	Allegheny River (USA)	Lear Fan
Sire Myboycharlie (IRE) 2005	Danetime; 1994	Allegheny River (USA)	Allesheny (IRE)
Sire Myboycharlie (IRE) 2005	Dulceata; 1988	Rousillon (USA)	Riverman
Sire Myboycharlie (IRE) 2005	Dulceata; 1988	Rousillon (USA)	Belle Dorine
Sire Myboycharlie (IRE) 2005	Dulceata; 1988	Snowtop	Thatching
Sire Myboycharlie (IRE) 2005	Dulceata; 1988	Snowtop	Icing
Dam Starlet's Sister (IRE) 2009	Galileo; 1998	Sadler's Wells (USA)	Northern Dancer (CAN)
Dam Starlet's Sister (IRE) 2009	Galileo; 1998	Sadler's Wells (USA)	Fairy Bridge
Dam Starlet's Sister (IRE) 2009	Galileo; 1998	Urban Sea (USA)	Miswaki
Dam Starlet's Sister (IRE) 2009	Galileo; 1998	Urban Sea (USA)	Allegretta (GB)
Dam Starlet's Sister (IRE) 2009	Premiere Creation (FR); 1997	Green Tune (USA)	Green Dancer
Dam Starlet's Sister (IRE) 2009	Premiere Creation (FR); 1997	Green Tune (USA)	Soundings
Dam Starlet's Sister (IRE) 2009	Premiere Creation (FR); 1997	Allwaki (USA)	Miswaki
Dam Starlet's Sister (IRE) 2009	Premiere Creation (FR); 1997	Allwaki (USA)	Alloy (FR) (Family: 16-h)

- Through her dam, Sistercharlie was inbred 4 × 4 to Miswaki, meaning that this stallion appears twice in the fourth generation of her pedigree.
