= Bushranger (Irish horse) =

Irish-bred Thoroughbred racehorse

- Sire: Danetime
- Grandsire: Danehill
- Dam: Danz Danz
- Damsire: Efisio
- Sex: Stallion
- Foaled: 19 February 2006
- Country: Ireland
- Colour: Bay
- Breeder: Tally-Ho Stud
- Owner: Derrick Smith, Susan Magnier & Michael Tabor
- Trainer: David Wachman
- Record: 10: 4-1-1
- Earnings: £339,737

Major wins
- Anglesey Stakes (2008); Prix Morny (2008); Middle Park Stakes (2008)

Bushranger (foaled 19 February 2006) is an Irish Thoroughbred racehorse and sire. He showed his best form as a two-year-old in 2008 when he won four of his seven races including the Anglesey Stakes in Ireland, the Prix Morny in France and the Middle Park Stakes in England as well as finishing second in the Phoenix Stakes. He was rated the second-best juvenile of the year in Europe. Bushranger failed to recapture his form in three starts as a three-year-old and was retired to stud at the end of 2009. He has had some success as a sire of winners.

== Background ==
Bushranger is a bay horse with no white markings bred in Ireland by the County Westmeath-based Tally-Ho Stud. As a foal, Bushranger was offered for sale at Goffs on 15 November 2006 and bought for 15,000 euros by the Oaks Farm. In August 2007 the yearling returned to the sales ring at Doncaster and was bought for 100,000 guineas by John O'Byrne, acting on behalf of John Magnier's Coolmore Stud. The colt was sent into training with Magnier's son-in-law David Wachman in County Tipperary. Like many Coolmore horses, the official details of his ownership changed from race to race: he was sometimes listed as being the property of either Derrick Smith, or Michael Tabor whilst on other occasions he was described as being owned by a partnership of Smith, Tabor and Susan Magnier.

Bushranger was sired by Danetime, a high-class sprinter who recorded his biggest win when taking the Stewards' Cup as a three-year-old in 1997. As a breeding stallion he sired several other good winners including Myboycharlie (Prix Morny), Utmost Respect (Duke of York Stakes), Baltic King (Wokingham Stakes), Vital Equine (Champagne Stakes) and Look Busy (Temple Stakes). Bushranger's dam Danz Danz was an unraced daughter of Efisio. She was a granddaughter of Docklands, a half-sister of the 1000 Guineas winner Night Off.

== Racing career ==
=== 2008: two-year-old season ===
On his racecourse debut Bushranger contested a five furlong maiden race at Tipperary Racecourse on 5 June and started third favourite behind the Aidan O'Brien-trained Navajo and the filly Nubar Lady in a field of twelve. Ridden by Wayne Lordan he raced close behind the leaders before overtaking Nubar Lady in the final strides and winning by a neck. The colt was then sent to England and stepped up in class for the Listed Windsor Castle Stakes at Royal Ascot on 17 June. He started the 4/1 but after being slightly hampered at half way he was beaten half a length by the 100/1 outsider Flashmans Papers. The colt then returned to Ireland for the Group Three Anglesey Stakes over six and a half furlongs at the Curragh on 13 July. With Lordan again in the saddle he started the 7/2 second favourite behind the O'Brien-trained Westphalia whilst the other five runners included Intense Focus and Heart of Fire, the winner of the Listed Rochestown Stakes. After being restrained just behind the leaders he took the lead a furlong out and won "comfortably" by two and a half lengths from Westphalia.

Two weeks after his win in the Anglesey Stakes, Bushranger started the 2/1 second favourite in a five-runner field for the Group One Phoenix Stakes over six furlongs at the Curragh but never looked likely to win and finished third behind Mastercraftsman and the British-trained favourite Art Connoisseur. The colt was then sent to France for the Prix Morny over 1200 metres at Deauville Racecourse on 24 August in which he was ridden by Johnny Murtagh. He was made the 4.5/1 favourite ahead of the Italian-trained Lui Rei (winner of the Prix Robert Papin) whilst the other twelve runners included Classic Blade (July Stakes), Naaqoos (later to win the Prix Jean-Luc Lagardère), Silver Frost (Prix de Cabourg), Gallagher (runner-up in the Richmond Stakes) and Lord Shanakill (runner-up in the Vintage Stakes). After tracking the leaders, Bushranger began to make progress 300 metres out, took the lead 150 metres from the finish and won by half a length from Gallagher. Wachman commented "It was great. We have always thought a lot of him, and Johnny gave him a very good ride. It all went to plan, he got a lead and took it up late" before adding "He'll get seven furlongs the way he stayed today. The owners have a lot of horses and we'll have to see what fits in with their plans".

Murtagh again took the ride when Bushranger started the 15/8 favourite for the Group One Middle Park Stakes over six furlong at Newmarket Racecourse on 2 October. Gallagher and Classic Blade were again in opposition whilst the other six runners included Prolific (Richmond Stakes), Finjaan (Molecomb Stakes), Sayif (third in the Mill Reef Stakes) and the highly regarded maiden winner Huntdown. Bushranger raced down the centre of the wide, straight course, tracking the leader Sayil whilst most of the other runners raced on the far side (the right hand side from the jockeys' viewpoint). He overtook Sayil inside the final furlong and stayed on to win by one and a quarter lengths with a gap of two and a half lengths back to Huntdown in third. After the race Murtagh said "He's a grand little horse and I'm learning a lot about him. He's a strong two-year-old who's very professional and just keeps on winning."

On his final race of the year Bushranger was sent to California for the Breeders' Cup Juvenile on the synthetic Pro-Ride surface at Santa Anita Park and was made the 5.5/1 fourth choice in the betting. Drawn on the outside he was forced to race wide throughout the race and finished eleventh of the twelve runners. The only horse who finished behind him was the subsequent Kentucky Derby winner Mine That Bird.

=== 2009: three-year-old season ===
In 2009 Bushranger was matched against older horses in major sprint races but made little impact in three starts. On his seasonal debut he contested the Greenlands Stakes over six furlongs at the Curragh and finished fourth behind the five-year-old gelding Utmost Respect. In his two remaining races Bushranger failed to reach the frame in British Group One races, finishing eleventh behind Art Connoisseur in the Golden Jubilee Stakes at Royal Ascot and ninth to Regal Parade in the Haydock Sprint Cup on 5 September.

== Assessment ==
In the 2008 European Thoroughbred Rankings, Bushranger was given a rating of 121, making him the second-best juvenile of the year, one pound behind Mastercraftsman.

== Stud record ==
After his retirement from racing, Bushranger returned to his birthplace to become a breeding stallion at the Tally-Ho Stud in Ireland before being exported to Turkey in 2016. The best of his Irish progeny have included Ridge Ranger (Summer Stakes), Outback Traveller (Wokingham Stakes), Mobsta (Greenlands Stakes) and Now Or Never (Derrinstown Stud 1,000 Guineas Trial).

== Pedigree ==
Pedigree of Bushranger (IRE), bay stallion, 2006
Sire Danetime (IRE) 1994	Danehill (USA); 1986	Danzig	Northern Dancer (CAN)
Sire Danetime (IRE) 1994	Danehill (USA); 1986	Danzig	Pas de Nom
Sire Danetime (IRE) 1994	Danehill (USA); 1986	Razyana	His Majesty
Sire Danetime (IRE) 1994	Danehill (USA); 1986	Razyana	Spring Adieu (CAN)
Sire Danetime (IRE) 1994	Allegheny River (USA); 1987	Lear Fan	Roberto
Sire Danetime (IRE) 1994	Allegheny River (USA); 1987	Lear Fan	Wac
Sire Danetime (IRE) 1994	Allegheny River (USA); 1987	Allesheny	Be My Guest
Sire Danetime (IRE) 1994	Allegheny River (USA); 1987	Allesheny	Bold Sands
Dam Danz Danz (GB) 1997	Efisio (GB); 1982	Formidable (USA)	Forli (ARG)
Dam Danz Danz (GB) 1997	Efisio (GB); 1982	Formidable (USA)	Native Partner
Dam Danz Danz (GB) 1997	Efisio (GB); 1982	Eldoret (IRE)	High Top
Dam Danz Danz (GB) 1997	Efisio (GB); 1982	Eldoret (IRE)	Bamburi (GB)
Dam Danz Danz (GB) 1997	Darcey Bussell (GB); 1992	Green Desert (USA)	Danzig
Dam Danz Danz (GB) 1997	Darcey Bussell (GB); 1992	Green Desert (USA)	Foreign Courier
Dam Danz Danz (GB) 1997	Darcey Bussell (GB); 1992	Docklands (IRE)	On Your Mark (USA)
Dam Danz Danz (GB) 1997	Darcey Bussell (GB); 1992	Docklands (IRE)	Persuader (GB) (Family 16-g)

- Bushranger was inbred 3 × 4 to Danzig, meaning that this stallion appear in both the third and fourth generations of his pedigree
