= Art Connoisseur =

Irish-bred Thoroughbred racehorse

- Sire: Lucky Story
- Grandsire: Kris S
- Dam: Withorwithoutyou
- Damsire: Danehill
- Sex: Stallion
- Foaled: 20 March 2006
- Country: Ireland
- Colour: Bay
- Breeder: Denis McDonnell
- Owner: Richard Green
- Trainer: Michael Bell
- Record: 11: 4-1-0
- Earnings: £385,999

Major wins
- Coventry Stakes (2008); Golden Jubilee Stakes (2009)

Art Connoisseur (foaled 20 March 2006) is an Irish-bred, British-trained Thoroughbred racehorse and sire best known for his upset victory in the 2009 edition of the Golden Jubilee Stakes. He showed high-class form as a two-year-old in 2008, winning his first three races including the Coventry Stakes at Royal Ascot and then finishing second in a strong renewal of the Phoenix Stakes. In 2009 he was well-beaten on his seasonal debut before defeating a top-class international field in the Golden Jubilee Stakes at odds of 20/1. He failed to reproduce anything approaching his Ascot form in four subsequent starts and was retired from racing at the end of the year. He has had little success as a breeding stallion.

== Background ==
Art Connoisseur is a bay horse with a small white star bred in Ireland by Denis McDonnell. He was the best horse sired by Lucky Story. a top-class racehorse who won the Richmond Stakes and the Champagne Stakes as well as finishing second in the Queen Elizabeth II Stakes. Art Connoisseur's dam Withorwithouyou showed modest ability as a racehorse, winning one minor race at Warwick Racecourse in twelve starts. She was a granddaughter of Morning Has Broken, the female-line ancestor of Balanchine and West Wind (Prix de Diane).

In October, the yearling was consigned by Parkway Farm to the Tattersalls sales and was bought for 55,000 guineas by the bloodstock agents Kern, Lillingston Associates. Art Connoisseur entered the ownership of Richard Green and was sent into training with Michael Bell at Newmarket, Suffolk.

== Racing career ==
=== 2008: two-year-old season ===
Art Connoisseur was ridden in all of his races as a two-year-old by Jamie Spencer. On his racecourse debut he started 100/30 second favourite for a five furlong maiden race at Leicester Racecourse on 3 April. After racing in second place he took the lead approaching the final furlong and went clear of his five rivals to win by three and a quarter lengths. Two weeks later the colt started 11/10 favourite for a minor race over the same distance at Newmarket Racecourse. He took the lead a furlong out and won by two and a quarter lengths from Servoca and ten others, although, as on his debut, he hung to the right in the closing stages.

On 17 June Art Connoisseur was moved up in class and distance for the Group Two Coventry Stakes over six furlongs at Royal Ascot. The Mick Channon-trained Orizaba ahead of Himalaya with Art Connoisseur the 8/1 third choice in an eighteen-runner field. After being restrained towards the rear of the field he made rapid progress in the last quarter mile and took the lead inside the final furlong. Despite hanging right yet again he was "soon in full control" and won by two and a quarter lengths and a short head from Intense Focus and Lord Shanakill (later to win the Prix Jean Prat).

In July he was sent to Ireland for the Group One Phoenix Stakes at the Curragh and started favourite against four Irish-trained runners. He stayed on from the rear of the field but sustained his first defeat as he was beaten into second place by Mastercraftsman with Bushranger (later to win the Prix Morny and the Middle Park Stakes) in third. In August the colt started second favourite for the rescheduled Gimcrack Stakes which was run at Newbury Racecourse after the York meeting was abandoned. He tracked the leaders before fading in the last quarter mile and finished eighth of the twelve runners behind Shaweel. He sustained a minor crack to his cannon bone in the race and missed the rest of the season.

=== 2009: three-year-old season ===
On his three-year-old debut, Art Connoisseur was assigned top weight of 131 pounds in the European Free Handicap over seven furlongs at Newmarket on 15 April. Ridden by Spencer he pulled hard in the early stages but after struggling to obtain a clear run he was eased down in the closing stages and finished seventh behind Ouqba. In May Art Connoisseur's training was interrupted by a minor leg injury. His exercise over the next month involved two weeks of swimming followed by two weeks of canters before returning to full training in June.

Tom Queally took over from the suspended Jamie Spencer when Art Connoisseur was matched against older horses for the first time and started a 20/1 outsider for the Group One Golden Jubilee Stakes at Royal Ascot on 20 June. The race attracted a strong international challenge including the favourite J J the Jet Plane (Al Quoz Sprint) from South Africa, Sacred Kingdom from Hong Kong, Cannonball from the United States, Ialysos from Greece, Bushranger from Ireland and the former American sprinter Diabolical (Alfred G. Vanderbilt Handicap), now representing Godolphin. The British challengers included Kingsgate Native, King's Apostle (Diadem Stakes) and Regal Parade (Ayr Gold Cup). Queally restrained his mount as J J the Jet Plane set the pace before giving way to the outsider Lesson In Humility two furlongs out. Art Connoisseur was switched left to race up the stands-side rail, overtook Lesson In Humility a furlong from the finish and held off the late challenge of Cannonball to win by a length. After the race Michael Bell said "It's such a thrill because we turned down telephone numbers for him and now it looks the right decision. I was slightly regretting it over the winter." Queally commented "It's great to be on board and the horse did it very well. I just gave him time, got a split and it was do or die then up the rails. He idles in his work and only does as much as he has to, but I gave him a couple of cracks and he knuckled down great".

The rest of Art Connoisseur's racing career was a complete disappointment: in four races he failed to finish in the first ten and never finished within nine lengths of the winner. He finished twelfth of thirteen behind Fleeting Spirit in the July Cup, fifteenth behind Borderlescott in the Nunthorpe Stakes (when his saddle slipped) and twelfth behind Regal Parade in the Haydock Sprint Cup. On his final appearance, he finished eleventh of the fourteen runners behind Sayif in the Diadem Stakes at Ascot Racecourse on 27 September.

== Stud career ==
Art Connoisseur was retired from racing at the end of his three-year-old season and became a breeding stallion at the Irish National Stud with an initial stud fee of €7,000. In December 2014 the eight-year-old stallion was auctioned at Tattersalls and bought for 40,000 guineas by Oliver St Lawrence Bloodstock. He has several minor winners but no top-class performers: the best of his offspring has probably been Suzi's Connoisseur, who won a Listed race in Germany.

== Pedigree ==
Pedigree of Art Connoisseur (IRE), bay stallion, 2006
Sire Lucky Story (USA) 2001	Kris S (USA); 1977	Roberto	Hail To Reason
Sire Lucky Story (USA) 2001	Kris S (USA); 1977	Roberto	Bramalea
Sire Lucky Story (USA) 2001	Kris S (USA); 1977	Sharp Queen	Princequillo
Sire Lucky Story (USA) 2001	Kris S (USA); 1977	Sharp Queen	Bridgework
Sire Lucky Story (USA) 2001	Spring Flight (USA); 1987	Miswaki	Mr. Prospector
Sire Lucky Story (USA) 2001	Spring Flight (USA); 1987	Miswaki	Hopepringseternal
Sire Lucky Story (USA) 2001	Spring Flight (USA); 1987	Coco La Investment	Coco La Terreur
Sire Lucky Story (USA) 2001	Spring Flight (USA); 1987	Coco La Investment	Great Investment
Dam Withorwithoutyou (IRE) 2001	Danehill (USA); 1986	Danzig	Northern Dancer
Dam Withorwithoutyou (IRE) 2001	Danehill (USA); 1986	Danzig	Pas de Nom
Dam Withorwithoutyou (IRE) 2001	Danehill (USA); 1986	Razyana	His Majesty
Dam Withorwithoutyou (IRE) 2001	Danehill (USA); 1986	Razyana	Spring Adieu
Dam Withorwithoutyou (IRE) 2001	Morningsurprice (USA); 1995	Future Storm	Storm Cat
Dam Withorwithoutyou (IRE) 2001	Morningsurprice (USA); 1995	Future Storm	Sea Sands
Dam Withorwithoutyou (IRE) 2001	Morningsurprice (USA); 1995	Morning Has Broken	Prince John
Dam Withorwithoutyou (IRE) 2001	Morningsurprice (USA); 1995	Morning Has Broken	A Wind is Rising (Family: 4-k)
