= Regal Parade =

British-bred Thoroughbred racehorse

- Sire: Pivotal
- Grandsire: Polar Falcon
- Dam: Atlantic Destiny
- Damsire: Royal Academy
- Sex: Gelding
- Foaled: 8 March 2004
- Country: United Kingdom
- Colour: Chestnut
- Breeder: Highclere Stud & Harry Herbert
- Owner: Sheikh Mohammed; Dab Hand Racing; Roalco & J Goddard
- Trainer: Mark Johnston; David Nicholls; Milton Bradley; Charlie Wallis
- Record: 104: 13-15-12
- Earnings: £779,586

Major wins
- Buckingham Palace Stakes (2008); Ayr Gold Cup (2008); City Plate (2009); Haydock Sprint Cup (2009); Hackwood Stakes (2010); Prix Maurice de Gheest (2010)

Regal Parade, (foaled 8 March 2004) is a British Thoroughbred racehorse. In a track career which lasted from January 2007 until October 2016 he contested 104 races, winning 13 times and being placed on 27 occasions. He won three minor races as a three-year-old in 2007 and improved in the following year to win the Buckingham Palace Stakes and the Ayr Gold Cup. In the next two years he showed top class form over sprint distances, taking the City Plate and Haydock Sprint Cup in 2009 and the Hackwood Stakes and Prix Maurice de Gheest in 2010. He remained in training until the age of twelve but never returned to the highest class and won only three minor races before being retired from racing,

== Background ==
Regal Parade is a chestnut horse with a narrow white blaze bred in England by the Hampshire-based Highclere Stud and Harry Herbert. As a yearling in October 2015 the colt was put up for auction at Tattersalls and was bought for 430,000 guineas by John Ferguson Bloodstock on behalf of Sheikh Mohammed. He was sent into training with Mark Johnston at Middleham Moor, North Yorkshire. Regal Parade was gelded before he began his racing career.

His sire Pivotal was a top class sprinter who won the King's Stand Stakes and the Nunthorpe Stakes in 1996. He went on to become an "excellent" sire, getting the winners of more than a thousand races across a range of distances including Sariska, Somnus, Farhh, Kyllachy and Immortal Verse. Regal Parade's dam Model Queen showed modest racing ability, winning one minor race from eight attempts. As a granddaughter of the broodmare Mofida (foaled 1974), she was closely related to many good winners including Zafonic, Midday, Elmaamul and Reams of Verse.

== Racing career ==
=== 2007: three-year-old season ===
Regal Parade did not race until he was three years old but he made an immediate impact. He won a maiden race over seven furlongs on the synthetic Polytrack surface at Wolverhampton Racecourse in January and followed up a month later by taking a handicap over the same distance at Southwell Racecourse. He was switched to the turf on 6 May for a handicap at Newmarket Racecourse in which he was ridden by Kevin Darley and started at odds of 4/1. Carrying 123 pounds he completed his hat-trick as he took the lead a furlong out and won by two lengths from the filly Miss Lucifer. The gelding sustained his first defeat later that month when he came home seventh in a handicap at Haydock Park. He failed to win again in 2007, finishing no better that fourth in seven subsequent races.

At the end of October he returned to the Tattersalls sales ring and was bought for 16,000 guineas by the trainer David Nicholls. The gelding was taken into training by Nicholls at Sessay and entered the ownership of Dab Hand Racing.

=== 2008: four-year-old season ===
In 2008 Regal Parade failed to win in his first five races but finished second on three occasions. He was then sent to Royal Ascot on 20 June to contest the Buckingham Palace Stakes, a seven furlong handicap and went off at odds of 25/1 in a 28-runner field. Ridden by the apprentice jockey Ahmed Ajtebi he took the lead a furlong from the finish and won by half a length from the six-year-old Dhaular Dhar.

Regal Parade ran third in the Bunbury Cup at Newmarket and was unplaced in a valuable handicap at Goodwood before being off the course for seven weeks. The apprentice William Carson rode him when he returned on 20 September for the Ayr Gold Cup over six furlongs (a distance over which he had never previously run) on heavy ground in which he carried a weight of 122 pounds and started at odds of 18/1 in a 27-runner field. After being restrained in the early stages he made strong progress in the last quarter mile, went to the front a furlong out and came home two and a quarter lengths clear of his rivals. Nicholls commented "One of the owners booked William. I had never seen him before we met in the parade ring, and I told him to ride the horse with plenty of confidence and he gave him a great ride" while Carson said "My grandfather never won the Ayr Gold Cup but he finished second once and he thought he had won!" On his only other start of the year Regal Parade was stepped up in class for the Group 3 Bengough Stakes at Ascot in October and finished fourth.

=== 2009: five-year-old season ===
On 28 March Regal Parade began his 2009 campaign by running sixth in a minor race at Kempton and then finished second to Asset when favourite for the Leicestershire Stakes four weeks later. At York Racecourse on 30 May the gelding was ridden by Adrian Nicholls (the son of his trainer) when he started the 13/2 fourth choice in the betting for a minor event over seven furlongs. In a tightly contested finish the gelding gained the advantage in the closing stages and won by a neck and a head from Mia's Boy and Court Masterpiece. In June he contested his first Group 1 race and came home ninth behind Art Connoisseur in the Golden Jubilee Stakes at Royal Ascot. On 11 July, with Nicholls again in the saddle, he started 11/4 second favourite for the Listed City Plate over seven furlongs at Chester Racecourse. After tracking the leaders he took the lead inside the final furlong and held on under pressure to win by half a length from the favoured Balthazaar's Gift.

In his next two races Regal Parade finished third to Finjaan in the Lennox Stakes at Goodwood and second to Balthazaar's Gift in the Hungerford Stakes at Newbury. On 5 September the gelding started at odds of 14/1 for the Group 1 Haydock Sprint Cup in which he was again ridden by Nicholls. Fleeting Spirit started favourite while the other twelve runners included Finjaan, Asset, Art Connoisseur, High Standing (Wokingham Stakes), Main Aim (John of Gaunt Stakes), Equiano, Bushranger and the South African challenger J J The Jet Plane. After being restrained in the early stages he was switched left in the last quarter mile, overtook Fleeting Spirit 100 yards from the finish and won by half a length. Adrian Nicholls commented "I would have preferred to be a bit handier as the race was developing, but they went a good gallop. Ideally, I wanted to follow Fleeting Spirit, but I got taken back a place or two. At halfway, I gave him a little dig and he has come good. I thought I would keep it uncomplicated. I switched him out and once I did I was confident I was going to get the filly. All credit to Dad – I just do the pointing and the steering".

=== 2010: six-year-old season ===
In March 2010 Regal Parade was sent to the United Arab Emirates to contest the Dubai Golden Shaheen at Meydan Racecourse in which he finished last of the ten runners behind Kinsale King. On his return to Europe he ran unplaced behind Starspangledbanner in the Golden Jubilee Stakes. In the Hackwood Stakes at Newbury on 17 July the gelding started at odds of 15/2 in a field of nine. He raced towards the rear of the field before making rapid progress on the outside to gain the advantage in the last quarter mile and drew away in the closing stages to win by three lengths from High Standing.

Regal Parade was sent to France for the Group 1 Prix Maurice de Gheest over 1300 metres at Deauville Racecourse on 8 August and started the 5/1 second favourite behind the Prix de la Forêt winner Varenar. The other thirteen runners included Joanna (Prix de Sandringham), War Artist (Prix de Ris-Orangis), Alverta (Coolmore Classic), Planet Five (Prix du Gros Chêne), High Standing, Arabian Gleam (Challenge Stakes) and Prime Defender (Duke of York Stakes). Ridden by Nicholls, he raced in mid-division before making good progress to move into contention just after half way. He took the lead 300 metres from the finish and kept on well in the closing stages to win by a neck from Joanna with the pair finishing four lengths clear of High Standing in third place. After the race, Adrian Nicholls jnr said: "He's an ex-Mark Johnston horse and everyone knows how tough his horses are – and this horse is no different. The filly (Joanna) travelled really well and I wanted to try and get cover behind her if possible as it was a really rough race down on the inside... I was a bit worried passing the furlong marker but my fellow has such a big heart and gave it his all at the finish."

In his two subsequent starts of 2010 Regal Parade finished sixth to Markab when attempting to repeat his 2009 success in the Haydock Sprint Cup and then ran a close fourth behind Goldikova, Paco Boy and Dick Turpin in the Prix de la Forêt at Longchamp Racecourse on 3 October.

=== Later career: 2011–2016 ===
In 2011 Regal Parade failed to win in eight races, although he was placed in the Duke of York Stakes, John of Gaunt Stakes and Chipchase Stakes. In the following year he moved to the stable of Milton Bradley at Sedbury. He was beaten in his first fourteen races before snapping his two-year losing streak when he won a valuable handicap over six furlongs at York in October. In 2013 he ran thirteen times, recording his only success in May when he won a minor race over six furlongs at Haydock. In the following year he ran ten times and won once, taking a handicap race at Newmarket in August. Before the start of the 2015 season Regal Parade was acquired by Roalco & J Goddard and was moved to the stable of Charlie Wallis at Ardleigh. He raced eleven times that year, and failed to win although he was placed five times. As a twelve-year-old in 2016 he failed to win in eleven starts, ending his track career by running sixth in a minor handicap race at Yarmouth Racecourse on 18 October.

== Pedigree ==
Pedigree of Regal Parade (GB), chestnut gelding, 2004
Sire Pivotal (GB) 1993	Polar Falcon (USA); 1987	Nureyev	Northern Dancer (CAN)
Sire Pivotal (GB) 1993	Polar Falcon (USA); 1987	Nureyev	Special
Sire Pivotal (GB) 1993	Polar Falcon (USA); 1987	Marie d'Argonne (FR)	Jefferson (GB)
Sire Pivotal (GB) 1993	Polar Falcon (USA); 1987	Marie d'Argonne (FR)	Mohair
Sire Pivotal (GB) 1993	Fearless Revival (GB); 1987	Cozzene (USA)	Caro (IRE)
Sire Pivotal (GB) 1993	Fearless Revival (GB); 1987	Cozzene (USA)	Ride The Trails
Sire Pivotal (GB) 1993	Fearless Revival (GB); 1987	Stufida	Bustino
Sire Pivotal (GB) 1993	Fearless Revival (GB); 1987	Stufida	Zerbinetta
Dam Model Queen (USA) 1998	Kingmambo (USA); 1990	Mr. Prospector	Raise a Native
Dam Model Queen (USA) 1998	Kingmambo (USA); 1990	Mr. Prospector	Gold Digger
Dam Model Queen (USA) 1998	Kingmambo (USA); 1990	Miesque	Nureyev
Dam Model Queen (USA) 1998	Kingmambo (USA); 1990	Miesque	Pasadoble
Dam Model Queen (USA) 1998	Model Bride (USA); 1985	Blushing Groom (FR)	Red God (USA)
Dam Model Queen (USA) 1998	Model Bride (USA); 1985	Blushing Groom (FR)	Runaway Bride (GB)
Dam Model Queen (USA) 1998	Model Bride (USA); 1985	Mofida (GB)	Right Tack
Dam Model Queen (USA) 1998	Model Bride (USA); 1985	Mofida (GB)	Wold Lass (Family: 9-e)

- Regal Parade was inbred 3 × 4 to Nureyev, meaning that this stallion appears in both the third and fourth generations of his pedigree.
