= City Plate =

Flat horse race in Britain

City Plate
2026
Northern Champion	Dash Of Azure	Holguin

Previous years
2025
Holguin	Witness Stand	Marvelman
2024
Al Shabab Storm	Breege	Vafortino
2023
Holguin	Fast Response	Witch Hunter
2022
Laneqash	Misty Grey	Oscula
2021
Safe Voyage	Matthew Flinders	Oh This Is Us

2020-2011
2019
Beauty Filly	Oh This Is Us	Salateen
2018
Oh This Is Us	Promising	Chessman
2017
Viscount Barfield	Jungle Cat	Jallota
2016
Birchwood	Sovereign Debt	Jamesie
2015
Dusky Queen	Intransigent	Gabrial
2014
Glory Awaits	Miracle of Medinah	Mushir
2013
Ladyship	Rivas Rhapsody	Dr Red Eye
2012
Majestic Myles	Royal Rock	Our Jonathan
2011
Majestic Myles	Mon Cadeaux	Capercaillie

2010-2003
2010
Lord Shanakill	Dunelight	Ishiadancer
2009
Regal Parade	Balthazaar's Gift	Hartley
2008
Blythe Knight	Beckermet	Army of Angels
2007
Song of Passion	Fonthill Road	Vanderlin
2006
Prince of Light	Vanderlin	Mac Love
2005
Three Graces	Vanderlin	Suggestive
2004
Vanderlin	Makhlab	Millennium Force
2003
Monsieur Bond	Halmahera	Sir Edwin Landseer

The City Plate is a Listed flat horse race in Great Britain open to horses aged three years or older. It is run at Chester over a distance of 7 furlongs and 1 yard (1,409 metres), and it is scheduled to take place each year in July.

The race was given its current name and awarded Listed status in 2008.

== Winners since 1999 ==
Year	Winner	Age	Jockey	Trainer	Time
1999	Free Option	4	Michael Roberts	Ben Hanbury	1:26.08
2000	Late Night Out	5	Michael Tebbutt	William Jarvis	1:25.66
2001	Fath	4	Richard Hills	Marcus Tregoning	1:25.60
2002	Grey Eminence	5	John Carroll	Richard Hannon, Sr.	1:24.36
2003	Monsieur Bond	3	Darryll Holland	Bryan Smart	1:24.53
2004	Vanderlin	5	Liam Keniry	Andrew Balding	1:25.36
2005	Three Graces	5	Kerrin McEvoy	Saeed bin Suroor	1:23.75
2006	Prince of Light	3	Jean-Pierre Guillambert	Mark Johnston	1:26.48
2007	Song of Passion	4	David Kinsella	Richard Hannon, Sr.	1:29.30
2008	Blythe Knight	8	Pat Cosgrave	John Quinn	1:25.50
2009	Regal Parade	5	Adrian Nicholls	David Nicholls	1:24.97
2010	Lord Shanakill	4	Tom Queally	Henry Cecil	1:25.72
2011	Majestic Myles	3	Tony Hamilton	Richard Fahey	1:26.67
2012	Majestic Myles	4	Freddie Tylicki	Richard Fahey	1:30.52
2013	Ladyship	4	Cathy Gannon	Michael Stoute	1:27.57
2014	Glory Awaits	4	Ian Brennan	Kevin Ryan	1:26.69
2015	Dusky Queen	5	Patrick Mathers	Richard Fahey	1:25.51
2016	Birchwood	3	Patrick Mathers	Richard Fahey	1:28.73
2017	Viscount Barfield	4	Rob Hornby	Andrew Balding	1:26.37
2018	Oh This Is Us	5	Tom Marquand	Richard Hannon Jr.	1:27.37
2019	Beauty Filly	4	Richard Kingscote	William Haggas	1:27.67
	no race 2020
2021	Safe Voyage	8	Jason Hart	John Quinn	1:25.31
2022	Laneqash	4	David Egan	Roger Varian	1:26.11
2023	Holguin	3	David Probert	Andrew Balding	1:31.99
2024	Al Shabab Storm	3	Jason Watson	Andrew Balding	1:29.79
2025	Holguin	5	Faleh Bughenaim	Hamad Al Jehani	1:23.65
2026	Northern Champion	3	Ashley Lewis	Ed Walker	1:25.12

== See also ==
- Horse racing in Great Britain
- List of British flat horse races
