= Astaire (horse) =

Irish-bred Thoroughbred racehorse

- Racing silks of Angie Bailey
- Sire: Intense Focus
- Grandsire: Giant's Causeway
- Dam: Runway Dancer
- Damsire: Dansili
- Sex: Stallion
- Foaled: 19 April 2011
- Country: Ireland
- Colour: Bay
- Breeder: John O'Connor
- Owner: Angie Bailey
- Trainer: Kevin Ryan
- Record: 17: 5–2-1
- Earnings: £381,401

Major wins
- Gimcrack Stakes (2013); Middle Park Stakes (2013); Abernant Stakes (2015)

Astaire (19 April 2011 – 9 August 2015) was an Irish-bred, British-trained Thoroughbred racehorse who was mainly campaigned over sprint distances. He produced his best performance as a juvenile in 2013 when he won four of his five races including the Gimcrack Stakes and Middle Park Stakes. He failed to win in the following year but came back to form in the early part of 2015 when he won the Abernant Stakes and finished third in the Diamond Jubilee Stakes. He died of colic in August that year.

== Background ==
Astaire was a bay colt with a white star bred in by John O'Connor at the Ballylinch Stud in County Kilkenny. As a foal in November 2011, Astaire was consigned to the Goffs sale and was bought for 45,000 euros by the bloodstock agent Amanda Skiffington. In the following year the yearling was offered for sale at Tattersalls in October and was bought for 23,000 guineas by the Grove Stud. He was back in the sales ring as a two-year-old in March 2013 at Kempton and was sold for £70,000 to the trainer Kevin Ryan. He entered the ownership of Angie Bailey and was taken into training by Ryan at Hambleton, North Yorkshire.

He was from the first crop of foals sired by Intense Focus, an American-bred horse who won the Dewhurst Stakes in 2008. His dam, Runway Dancer, was an unraced daughter of Dansili and a female-line descendant of the British broodmare Satanella (foaled 1941) who was the ancestor of many major winners including Chief Singer, Winged Love and Pleasantly Perfect.

== Racing career ==
=== 2013: two-year-old season ===
Astaire made his racecourse debut at York Racecourse on 25 May when he started at odds of 14/1 for a "median auction" maiden race (in which the weights carried were determined by the prices achieved by their sires' offspring at auction) over six furlongs. Ridden by Neil Callan and carrying 131 pounds he led from the start and held on in the closing stages to win by three-quarters of a length from Kommander Kirkup. He was then moved up sharply in class for the Group Two July Stakes at Newmarket Racecourse in which he took the lead a furlong out but faded in the closing stages and finished sixth of the eleven runners behind the Richard Hannon, Sr-trained Anjaal. Callan was replaced by Jamie Spencer when the colt started odds-on favourite for a minor stakes and distance on 27 July. Astaire went to the front from the start, established a clear advantage a furlong from the finish and won "comfortably" by two and three quarter lengths from Coulsty (later to win the Prix de Meautry).

Callan was back in the saddle when Astaire returned to Group Two class for the Gimcrack Stakes at York on 24 August. The Coventry Stakes runner-up Parbold started favourite ahead of the Irish challenger Wiltshire Boulevard (Anglesey Stakes) with Astaire the 5/1 joint third favourite alongside My Catch (Prix de Cabourg). The other three runners were Saayerr and Cable Bay (first and second in the Richmond Stakes) and the outsider Justice Day. Astaire took the lead soon after the start, accelerated a quarter of a mile from the finish and held on in close finish to win by a neck from Wiltshire Boulevard with Parbold a neck away in third. After the race Callan said "He's done it the hard way. He travelled so well and when I've let him down two out, he's taken two lengths out of the field, which probably won us the race,,, this is a lovely horse".

On his final appearance of the season Astaire was stepped up again in class when he was one of ten colts to contest the Group One Middle Park Stakes over six furlongs at Newmarket on 12 October and started at odds of 8/1. The Irish colts Great White Eagle (Round Tower Stakes) and Sudirman (Phoenix Stakes) headed the betting in front of Astaire's stablemate Hot Streak (Cornwallis Stakes) and Supplicant (Mill Reef Stakes), whilst the other runners included Justice Day, Brown Sugar (Molecomb Stakes, Sirenia Stakes) and Green Door (Flying Childers Stakes). As in most of his previous races that year, Astaire was sent to the front by Callan from the start before accelerating in the last quarter-mile. Despite hanging to the right he stayed on "gamely" in the closing stages and won by half a length from Hot Streak with Justice Day in third ahead of the 100/1 shot Speedfiend. Callan commented "He's much stronger than he was in the Gimcrack... he's very tough and genuine and he ground it out up the hill" whilst Ryan, having trained the first two finishers said "They're both very exciting horses. It was a shame one of them had to get beat."

=== 2014: three-year-old season ===
Astaire began his second season in the Greenham Stakes (a trial race for the 2000 Guineas) over seven furlongs at Newbury Racecourse on 12 April in which he led until the final furlong before tiring and finishing fifth of the ten runners behind Kingman. He was then dropped back to sprint distances and matched against older horses in the Duke of York Stakes over six furlongs at York in May. Ridden by Richard Hughes he took the lead a furlong out but was overtaken and beaten half a length by the seven-year-old gelding Maarek. Astaire continued to compete in sprint races but failed to win or place in four subsequent starts that year. He finished sixth to Slade Power in the Diamond Jubilee Stakes at Royal Ascot and then ran eleventh of thirteen behind the same horse in the July Cup. He then finished tenth to Sole Power in the Nunthorpe Stakes and eleventh behind G Force when a 50/1 outsider for the Haydock Sprint Cup in September.

=== 2015: four-year-old season ===
Astaire showed better form in the spring of 2015. He started 2/1 favourite for the Listed Cammidge Trophy over six furlongs at Doncaster Racecourse on 28 March and finished second to Naadirr after being overtaken 75 yards from the finish. On 16 April the colt was partnered by Jamie Spencer when he contested the Group Three Abernant Stakes at Newmarket and started the 9/2 second favourite behind the Hackwood Stakes winner Music Master. The other nine runners included Lucky Kristale (Lowther Stakes), Rivellino (Cleves Stakes) and Jack Dexter (Chipchase Stakes). Astaire went to the front after a furlong and stayed on "gamely" in the closing stages to win by half a length from Watchable.

The colt then finished sixth to Glass Office in the Duke of York Stakes (after briefly leading a furlong out), fifth to Mustajeeb in the Greenlands Stakes at the Curragh on his only overseas appearance. In the Diamond Jubilee Stakes on 20 June he started a 25/1 outsider but produced one of his best performance as he proved the best of the European runners, taking third place behind the American gelding Undrafted and the Australian Brazen Beau. In the July Cup a month later he finished eleventh of the fourteen runners behind Muhaarar.

Whilst being prepare for a run in the Nunthorpe Stakes Astaire contracted colic and was euthanised on 9 August 2015.

== Pedigree ==
Pedigree of Astaire (IRE), bay stallion, 2011
Sire Intense Focus (USA) 2006	Giant's Causeway (USA); 1997	Storm Cat	Storm Bird
Sire Intense Focus (USA) 2006	Giant's Causeway (USA); 1997	Storm Cat	Terlingua
Sire Intense Focus (USA) 2006	Giant's Causeway (USA); 1997	Mariah's Storm	Rahy
Sire Intense Focus (USA) 2006	Giant's Causeway (USA); 1997	Mariah's Storm	Immense
Sire Intense Focus (USA) 2006	Daneleta (IRE); 1999	Danehill	Danzig
Sire Intense Focus (USA) 2006	Daneleta (IRE); 1999	Danehill	Razyana
Sire Intense Focus (USA) 2006	Daneleta (IRE); 1999	Zavaleta	Kahyasi
Sire Intense Focus (USA) 2006	Daneleta (IRE); 1999	Zavaleta	La Meilleure
Dam Runway Dancer (GB) 2003	Dansili (GB); 1996	Danehill	Danzig
Dam Runway Dancer (GB) 2003	Dansili (GB); 1996	Danehill	Razyana
Dam Runway Dancer (GB) 2003	Dansili (GB); 1996	Hasili	Kahyasi
Dam Runway Dancer (GB) 2003	Dansili (GB); 1996	Hasili	Kerali
Dam Runway Dancer (GB) 2003	Shall We Run (GB); 1989	Hotfoot	Firestreak
Dam Runway Dancer (GB) 2003	Shall We Run (GB); 1989	Hotfoot	Pitter Patter
Dam Runway Dancer (GB) 2003	Shall We Run (GB); 1989	Sirnelta	Sir Tor
Dam Runway Dancer (GB) 2003	Shall We Run (GB); 1989	Sirnelta	Finelta (Family: 16-a)

- Astaire was inbred 3 × 3 to Danehill meaning that this stallion appears twice in the third generation of his pedigree. He was also inbred 4 × 4 to Kahyasi.
