= Intense Focus =

American-bred Thoroughbred racehorse

- Sire: Giant's Causeway
- Grandsire: Storm Cat
- Dam: Daneleta
- Damsire: Danehill
- Sex: Stallion
- Foaled: 24 February 2006
- Country: United States
- Colour: Bay
- Breeder: Robert N Clay & Airlie Stud
- Owner: Jackie Bolger & John Corcoran
- Trainer: Jim Bolger
- Record: 11: 2-2-3
- Earnings: £353,135

Major wins
- Dewhurst Stakes (2008)

Intense Focus (foaled 24 February 2006) was an American-bred, Irish-trained Thoroughbred racehorse and sire. As a two-year-old he was highly tried, running nine times. After winning a maiden race in May he was placed in the Coventry Stakes, Railway Stakes and Prix Jean-Luc Lagardère before recording a 20/1 upset victory in the Dewhurst Stakes. He failed to win in two starts in 2009 and was retired from racing. He has had some success as a breeding stallion.

== Background ==
Intense Focus is a bay horse with a small white star and a white sock on his left hind leg bred in Kentucky Robert N Clay of Three Chimneys Farm & the Airlie Stud. The colt was sent to Ireland and put up for auction at the Goffs Million sale in October 2007. He was bought for €340,000 by the trainer Jim Bolger. The colt raced in the ownership of Jim Bolger's wife Jackie, in partnership with John Corcoran. He was trained throughout his racing career by Jim Bolger in County Carlow and was ridden in all but one of his races by Kevin Manning.

He was from the fifth crop of foals sired by Giant's Causeway who was voted Cartier Horse of the Year in 2000, a year in which he won the St James's Palace Stakes, Eclipse Stakes, Sussex Stakes, International Stakes, Irish Champion Stakes. He later became a very successful breeding stallion in the United States, siring major winners including Footstepsinthesand, Ghanaati, Shamardal and Rite of Passage. Intense Focus's dam Daneleta won one race from seven starts and finished third in the Railway Stakes. Her dam Zavaleta won the Athasi Stakes and was a half-sister to the Gran Criterium winner Sholokhov and Affianced, the dam of Soldier of Fortune. As a descendant of the British broodmare Fanghorn she was also related to the outstanding sprinter Double Form.

== Racing career ==
=== 2008: two-year-old season ===
On his racecourse debut Intense Focus contested a six furlong maiden race on soft ground at the Curragh on 5 May and finished fourth of the fifteen runners behind the Aidan O'Brien-trained Mastercraftsman. Three weeks later, on firmer ground, the colt started 5/2 favourite for a maiden over the same course and distance. He took an early lead but then settled in third place before going to the front again two furlongs out. He stayed on strongly in the closing stages and won by a neck from Super Pistachio, a colt who went on to win the Champagne Stakes. Intense Focus was moved up in class and sent to England for the Group Two Coventry Stakes at Royal Ascot on 17 June in which he finished second, two and a quarter lengths behind Art Connoisseur who later won the Golden Jubilee Stakes. The other beaten horses included two other horses who went on to win major races later in the year: Lord Shanakill won the Mill Reef Stakes whilst Square Eddie won the Breeders' Futurity. Twelve days later, in the Railway Stakes at the Curragh, Intense Focus finished third in a three-way photo-finish, beaten a short-head and a neck by Mastercraftsman and Alhaban after briefly taking the lead in the last quarter mile. In the Anglesey Stakes at the Curragh on 13 July he finished fifth of the seven runners, beaten seven lengths by the subsequent Middle Park Stakes winner Bushranger.

After a break of two months, Intense Focus returned in the National Stakes on heavy ground at the Curragh on 14 September. He started a 16/1 outsider and made little impression, finishing sixth of the seven runners behind Mastercraftsman. In this race he was equipped with blinkers for the first time and wore them in all his subsequent starts. Two weeks later the colt contested a valuable sales race restricted to horses sold at the Goffs Million sale. With Manning taking the ride on the Bolger stable's most-fancied contender Gan Amhras, Intense Focus was ridden by Danny Morgan and started at odds of 20/1. He finished third of the eighteen runners beaten half a length and a length the British-trained Soul City and Gan Amhras. On his next appearance, the colt was sent to France for the Prix Jean-Luc Lagardère over 1400 metres at Longchamp Racecourse on 5 October. Starting a 16/1 outsider he finished third behind Naaqoos and Milanais with Mastercraftsman in fourth.

On 18 October, Intense Focus made his second appearance in England, when he contested Britain's most prestigious race for two-year-olds, the Dewhurst Stakes over seven furlongs at Newmarket Racecourse. The Aidan-O'Brien-trained Rip Van Winkle started the 6/4 favourite whilst Intense Focus was a 20/1 outsider. Soul City and Lord Shanakill were again in opposition, whilst the other nine runners included Ashram (Somerville Tattersall Stakes), Delegator, Shaweel (Gimcrack Stakes) and Finjaan (Molecomb Stakes). After tracking the leaders, Intense Focus took the lead a furlong out and was drive out by Manning as he faced several late challengers. In a "blanket finish" he prevailed by a nose from Lord Shanakill with Finjaan a nose away in third and Shaweel another half a length back in fourth. Delegator, Ashram and Rip Van Winkle also finished within two lengths of the winner. After the race Manning said "It was very close, and I wasn't 100 per cent sure [that he had won]. He travelled well and got there and kept going. He's kept progressing and he likes this quick ground". Bolger commented "He's a hardy horse. He was four kilos heavier today than in Paris and we just kept him ticking over".

=== 2009: three-year-old season ===
Intense Focus began his second season in the Leopardstown 2,000 Guineas Trial Stakes over one mile on 29 March. He started the eve money favourite in a five-runner field but after taking the lead in the last quarter mile he was overtaken and beaten a lengths by Recharge, to whom he was conceding three pounds in weight. Plans to run the colt in the Poule d'Essai des Poulains were abandoned after rain softened the ground in France. He did not reappear until June when he contested the St James's Palace Stakes at Royal Ascot. Starting at odds of 12/1 he finished fifth of the ten runners behind Mastercraftsman.

== Stud record ==
After his retirement from racing, Intense Focus became a breeding stallion at the Ballylinch Stud in County Kilkenny. In his first season, he sired Astaire who won the Middle Park Stakes in 2013. In 2016 he was standing at a fee of €5,000.

== Pedigree ==
Pedigree of Intense Focus (USA), bay stallion, 2006
| Sire Giant's Causeway (USA) 1997 | Storm Cat (USA); 1983 | Storm Bird | Northern Dancer |
| Sire Giant's Causeway (USA) 1997 | Storm Cat (USA); 1983 | Storm Bird | South Ocean |
| Sire Giant's Causeway (USA) 1997 | Storm Cat (USA); 1983 | Terlingua | Secretariat |
| Sire Giant's Causeway (USA) 1997 | Storm Cat (USA); 1983 | Terlingua | Crimson Saint |
| Sire Giant's Causeway (USA) 1997 | Mariah's Storm (USA); 1991 | Rahy | Blushing Groom |
| Sire Giant's Causeway (USA) 1997 | Mariah's Storm (USA); 1991 | Rahy | Glorious Song |
| Sire Giant's Causeway (USA) 1997 | Mariah's Storm (USA); 1991 | Immense | Roberto |
| Sire Giant's Causeway (USA) 1997 | Mariah's Storm (USA); 1991 | Immense | Imsodear |
| Dam Daneleta (GB) 1999 | Danehill (USA); 1986 | Danzig | Northern Dancer |
| Dam Daneleta (GB) 1999 | Danehill (USA); 1986 | Danzig | Pas de Nom |
| Dam Daneleta (GB) 1999 | Danehill (USA); 1986 | Razyana | His Majesty |
| Dam Daneleta (GB) 1999 | Danehill (USA); 1986 | Razyana | Spring Adieu |
| Dam Daneleta (GB) 1999 | Zavaleta (IRE); 1991 | Kahyasi | Ile de Bourbon |
| Dam Daneleta (GB) 1999 | Zavaleta (IRE); 1991 | Kahyasi | Kadissya |
| Dam Daneleta (GB) 1999 | Zavaleta (IRE); 1991 | La Meillure | Lord Gayle |
| Dam Daneleta (GB) 1999 | Zavaleta (IRE); 1991 | La Meillure | Gradille (Family: 14-c) |

- Intense Focus is inbred 4 × 4 to Northern Dancer meaning that this stallion appears twice in the fourth generation of his pedigree.
