= Buckingham Palace Stakes =

Flat horse race in Britain

- Class: Handicap
- Location: Ascot Racecourse; Ascot, England
- Inaugurated: 2002
- Race type: Flat / Thoroughbred
- Website: Ascot

Race information
- Distance: 7f (1,408 metres)
- Surface: Turf
- Track: Straight
- Qualification: Three-year-olds and up
- Weight: Handicap
- Purse: £110,000 (2025); 1st: £56,694

Buckingham Palace Stakes
2026
Mezcala	Elarak	Great Acclaim

Previous years
2025
Never So Brave	Akkadian Thunder	Holguin
2024
English Oak	Billyjoh	Carrytheone
2023
Witch Hunter	Croupier	Northern Express
2022
Inver Park	Ropey Guest	Rhoscolyn
2021
Highfield Princess	Danyah	Riot

2020-2011
2020
Motakhayyel	Jack's Point	Mutamaasik
2014
Louis The Pious	Horsted Keynes	Watchable
2013
Lightning Cloud	Dream Tune	Shamaal Nibras
2012
Eton Forever	Jamesie	Atlantic Sport
2011
Manassas	Excellent Guest	Striking Spirit

2010-2002
2010
Treadwell	Himalaya	Imperial Guest
2009
Giganticus	Al Muheer	Redford
2008
Regal Parade	Dhaular Dhar	Jedburgh
2007
Binanti	Fajr	Dabbers Ridge
2006
Uhoomagoo	Appalachian Trail	Binanti
2005
Jedburgh	King Jock	Stetchworth Prince
2004
Unscrupulous	Maghanim	True Night
2003
Attache	Hurricane Floyd	Mine
2002
Demonstrate	Lunar Leo	Kareeb

The Buckingham Palace Stakes is a flat handicap horse race in Great Britain open to horses aged three and over. It is run at Ascot over a distance of 7 furlongs (1,408 metres), and is currently scheduled to take place each year in June on the third day of the Royal Ascot meeting.

The Buckingham Palace Stakes was established in 2002, when the Royal Ascot meeting was extended to a fifth day to mark the Golden Jubilee of Elizabeth II and was named after Buckingham Palace, the London residence of the British monarch. It was last run in 2014 and replaced from the 2015 Royal Ascot meeting by a new Group One sprint race, the Commonwealth Cup. The Sporting Life called the loss of the only 7-furlong handicap at Royal Ascot "a mistake".

In 2020, the race returned as part of an expanded Royal Ascot programme, following the 10-week suspension of horse racing in the United Kingdom due to the COVID-19 pandemic. The revival was intended to be a one-off event but the race was retained from 2021 when the Royal Ascot meeting was permanently expanded to included seven races each day.

== Records ==
Leading jockey (3 wins):

- Neil Callan – Uhoomagoo (2006), Eton Forever (2012), Lightning Cloud (2013)

Leading trainer (2 wins):

- Kevin Ryan – Uhoomagoo (2006), Lightning Cloud (2013)

== Winners ==
Year	Winner	Age	Weight	Jockey	Trainer	Time
2002	Demonstrate	4	8-06	Richard Hughes	John Gosden	1:27.43
2003	Attache	5	9-12	Philip Robinson	Michael Jarvis	1:26.85
2004	Unscrupulous	5	8-05	Oscar Urbina	James Fanshawe	1:27.41
2005 (Note: The 2005 running took place at York)	Jedburgh	4	9-08	Mick Kinane	John Dunlop	1:22.53
2006	Uhoomagoo	8	8-09	Neil Callan	Kevin Ryan	1:27.45
2007	Binanti	7	8-07	Franny Norton	Patrick Chamings	1:29.28
2008	Regal Parade	4	8-11	Ahmed Ajtebi	David Nicholls	1:27.17
2009	Giganticus	6	8-12	Michael Hills	Barry Hills	1:27.44
2010	Treadwell	3	8-10	Fergus Sweeney	Jamie Osborne	1:25.90
2011	Manassas	6	9-00	Martin Dwyer	Brian Meehan	1:29.71
2012	Eton Forever	5	9-08	Neil Callan	Roger Varian	1:29.68
2013	Lightning Cloud	5	8-13	Neil Callan	Kevin Ryan	1:26.31
2014	Louis The Pious	6	9-04	Silvestre de Sousa	David O'Meara	1:26.85
2015–2019	Race not run
2020	Motakhayyel	4	9-03	Jim Crowley	Richard Hannon	1:26.19
2021	Highfield Princess	4	8-11	Jason Hart	John Quinn	1:25.96
2022	Inver Park	4	9-01	Ben Curtis	George Boughey	1:26.12
2023	Witch Hunter	4	9-10	Jamie Spencer	Richard Hannon Jr.	1:26.82
2024	English Oak	4	9-08	James Doyle	Ed Walker	1:25.16
2025	Never So Brave	4	9-12	Oisin Murphy	Andrew Balding	1:23.90
2026	Mezcala	4	9-01	Tom Marquand	Jack Channon	1:25.44

== See also ==
- Horse racing in Great Britain
- List of British flat horse races
