= Beverly D. Stakes =

- Class: Grade II
- Location: Colonial Downs; New Kent County, Virginia
- Inaugurated: 1987 (at Arlington Park)
- Race type: Thoroughbred – Flat racing
- Website: Colonial Downs

Race information
- Distance: 1 3/16 miles
- Surface: Turf
- Track: Left-handed
- Qualification: Fillies & Mares, three-years-old and older
- Weight: Weight for Age
- Purse: $500,000 (2022)

The Beverly D. Stakes is a Grade II flat horse race in the United States for thoroughbred fillies and mares aged three years and upward over a distance of 1 3/16 miles at Colonial Downs in New Kent County, Virginia. The event is a supporting stakes race on the Arlington Million racing program.

Churchill Downs, whose parent company owns the land of the defunct Arlington Park racetrack, hosted the Beverly D. Stakes in 2022. The 2023 race was run at Churchill-owned Colonial Downs in Virginia.

== History ==
The race was first run in 1987, but was not run the following season due to refurbishment at Arlington Park. It became a Grade I race in 1991. It was also not run in 1998/99 as the track was closed during this time.

The event was a Breeders' Cup Challenge "Win and You're In" qualifier for the Breeders' Cup Filly & Mare Turf.

Seven Beverly D winners have gone on to be voted the American Champion Female Turf Horse: Flawlessly (1993), Hatoof (1994), Possibly Perfect (1995), Golden Apples (2002), Stacelita (2011), Dank (2013), and Sistercharlie (2018).

In 2020 due to the COVID-19 pandemic in the United States, Arlington Park did not schedule the event in their shortened meeting.

The 2022 Beverly D. Stakes was run at Churchill Downs. The Louisville racetrack's parent company, Churchill Downs Incorporated (which owns the Arlington Park property), announced early that year that it would relocate the race along with several of Arlington's traditional stakes races, including the Arlington Million. Because the Churchill Downs turf course is smaller than the one used at Arlington, the distance of the 2022 race was shortened from 1 3/16 miles to 1 1/8 miles.

In December 2022 an agreement was reached between Churchill Downs and the American Graded Stakes Committee to move the 2023 Arlington Million and its supporting races, including the Beverly D., to Colonial Downs in Virginia. The move allowed the Beverly D. to return to its original distance of 1 3/16 miles.

== Records ==
Stakes record: (At 1 3/16 miles)

- 1:52.43 – Sistercharlie (IRE) (2019)

Margins:

- 7 3/4 lengths – England's Legend (FR) (2001)

Most wins:

- 2 – Sistercharlie (IRE) (2018, 2019)

Most wins by an owner:

- 4 – Martin S. Schwartz (2005, 2006, 2011, 2016)

Most wins by a jockey:

- 3 – Kent Desormeaux (1992, 2008, 2009)
- 3 - Ryan Moore (2013, 2014, 2021)
- 3 - John R. Velazquez (2018, 2019, 2026)

Most wins by a trainer:

- 6 – Chad Brown (2011, 2015, 2016, 2017, 2018, 2019)

== Winners ==
Year	Winner	Age	Jockey	Trainer	Owner	Distance	Time	Purse	Grade	Ref
At Colonial Downs – Beverly D. Stakes
2026	Gimme a Nother (SAF)	6	John R. Velazquez	H. Graham Motion	Newstead Stables	1 3/16 miles	1:54.28	$500,000	II	
2025	Charlene's Dream	4	Javier Castellano	Ed Moger Jr.	LP Domeyko Taylor	1 3/16 miles	1:53.74	$500,000	II	
2024	Moira	5	José L. Ortiz	Kevin Attard	Lanni Bloodstock, Madaket Stables & SF Racing	1 3/16 miles	1:54.80	$500,000	II	
2023	Fev Rover (IRE)	5	Javier Castellano	Mark E. Casse	Tracy Farmer	1 3/16 miles	1:54.35	$500,000	I	
At Churchill Downs
2022	× Dalika (GER)	6	Brian Hernandez Jr.	Albert Stall Jr.	Bal Mar Equine	1 1/8 miles	1:46.31	$500,000	I	
At Arlington Park
2021	Santa Barbara (IRE)	3	Ryan Moore	Aidan O'Brien	Mrs John Magnier, Michael Tabor, Derrick Smith and Westerburg	1 3/16 miles	1:54.55	$392,000	I	
2020	Race not held									
2019	Sistercharlie (IRE)	5	John R. Velazquez	Chad C. Brown	Peter M. Brant	1 3/16 miles	1:52.43	$600,000	I	
2018	Sistercharlie (IRE)	4	John R. Velazquez	Chad C. Brown	Peter M. Brant	1 3/16 miles	1:56.77	$600,000	I	
2017	Dacita (CHI)	6	Irad Ortiz Jr.	Chad C. Brown	Sheep Pond Partners & Bradley Thoroughbreds	1 3/16 miles	1:55.49	$600,000	I	
2016	Sea Calisi (FR)	4	Florent Geroux	Chad C. Brown	Martin S. Schwartz	1 3/16 miles	1:54.93	$700,000	I	
2015	† Watsdachances (IRE)	5	Joe Bravo	Chad C. Brown	Michael E. Kisber, Bradley Thoroughbreds & Nelson McMakin	1 3/16 miles	1:57.36	$700,000	I	
2014	Euro Charline (GB)	3	Ryan L. Moore	Marco Botti	Team Valor	1 3/16 miles	1:55.52	$750,000	I	
2013	Dank (GB)	4	Ryan L. Moore	Sir Michael R. Stoute	James Wigan	1 3/16 miles	1:53.38	$750,000	I	
2012	I'm A Dreamer (IRE)	5	Hayley Turner	David Simcock	Andrew Stone	1 3/16 miles	1:55.29	$750,000	I	
2011	Stacelita (FR)	5	Ramon A. Dominguez	Chad C. Brown	Martin S. Schwartz	1 3/16 miles	1:57:57	$750,000	I	
2010	Eclair de Lune (GER)	4	Junior Alvarado	Ron McAnally	Richard L. Duchossois	1 3/16 miles	1:56.56	$750,000	I	
2009	Dynaforce	6	Kent J. Desormeaux	William I. Mott	John A. Chandler	1 3/16 miles	1:58.29	$750,000	I	
2008	Mauralakana (FR)	5	Kent J. Desormeaux	Christophe Clement	Robert Scarborough	1 3/16 miles	1:55.18	$750,000	I	
2007	Royal Highness (GER)	5	Rene R. Douglas	Christophe Clement	Monceaux Stable	1 3/16 miles	1:56.68	$750,000	I	
2006	Gorella (FR)	4	Julien R. Leparoux	Patrick L. Biancone	Martin S. Schwartz	1 3/16 miles	1:53.71	$750,000	I	
2005	Angara (GB)	4	Gary L. Stevens	Patrick L. Biancone	Martin S. Schwartz	1 3/16 miles	1:58.30	$750,000	I	
2004	Crimson Palace (SAF)	5	Lanfranco Dettori	Saeed bin Suroor	Godolphin Racing	1 3/16 miles	1:56.58	$750,000	I	
2003	Heat Haze (GB)	4	Jose Valdivia Jr.	Robert J. Frankel	Juddmonte Farms	1 3/16 miles	1:55.94	$700,000	I	
2002	Golden Apples (IRE)	4	Pat Valenzuela	Ben D. A. Cecil	Gary A. Tanaka	1 3/16 miles	1:54.86	$700,000	I	
2001	England's Legend (FR)	4	Corey Nakatani	Christophe Clement	Baron Edouard de Rothschild	1 3/16 miles	1:56.75	$700,000	I	
2000	Snow Polina	5	Jerry D. Bailey	William I. Mott	Gary A. Tanaka	1 3/16 miles	1:55.87	$500,000	I	
1998–1999		Race not held								
1997	Memories of Silver	4	Jerry D. Bailey	James J. Toner	Joan G. & John W. Phillips	1 3/16 miles	1:54.38	$500,000	I	
1996	§ Timarida (IRE)	4	John P. Murtagh	John M. Oxx	HH Aga Khan IV	1 3/16 miles	1:54.06	$500,000	I	
1995	Possibly Perfect	5	Corey Nakatani	Robert J. Frankel	Blue Vista	1 3/16 miles	1:54.95	$500,000	I	
1994	Hatoof	5	Walter R. Swinburn	Christiane Head	Maktoum bin Rashid Al Maktoum	1 3/16 miles	1:55.59	$500,000	I	
1993	‡ Flawlessly	5	Chris McCarron	Charles E. Whittingham	Harbor View Farm	1 3/16 miles	1:55.61	$500,000	I	
1992	Kostroma (IRE)	6	Kent J. Desormeaux	Gary F. Jones	Robert Sangster	1 3/16 miles	1:54.10	$500,000	I	
1991	Fire the Groom	4	Gary L. Stevens	Bill Shoemaker	Edward C. Allred, Randall D. Hubbard & Constance Sczesny	1 3/16 miles	1:53.40	$500,000	I	
1990	Reluctant Guest	4	Robbie Davis	Richard E. Mandella	Robert Folsom	1 3/16 miles	1:53.20	$500,000		
1989	Claire Marine (IRE)	4	Chris McCarron	Charles E. Whittingham	Sidney L. Port & Charles E. Whittingham	1 3/16 miles	2:01.40	$500,000		
1988	Race not held									
Beverly D. Handicap
1987	Dancing On A Cloud	4	Jack M. Lauzon	James E. Day	Sam-Son Farm	1 1/16 miles	1:55.00	$57,750		

Notes:
§ Ran as an entry
× In the 2022 running at Churchull Downs, German-bred Dalika set a new track record for the 1 1/8 miles distance.
† In the 2015 running of the event Secret Gesture (GB) was first past the post but drifted out in the stretch run impeding Stephanie's Kitten the third-place finisher and was disqualified and placed third. Watsdachances (IRE) was declared the winner, Stephanie's Kitten placed and Secret Gesture (GB) placed third.
‡ In the 1993 running Australian Champion Let's Elope (NZ) crowded in close to the finishing line and was disqualified and placed third. Flawlessly was declared the winner and Via Borghese was placed second.

== See also ==
List of American and Canadian Graded races
