= Danetime =

Racehorse

Danetime (1994–2005) was a bay stallion by the Irish champion Danehill out of Allegheny River, a daughter of Lear Fan. He died at the Alwyn Park Stud of a ruptured artery in 2005.

His racing record was 15:3-3-3, including some Group 2 wins, most notably the Stewards' Cup. During his racing career, he was owned by Mrs John Magnier & Michael Tabor. He was sold in 1999 and retired to stud in Ireland and in Australia. He was successful at stud, siring mostly sprint winners and a number of successful two-year-olds. Shortly after his death, his son Myboycharlie became his first G1 winner.
